= Frontier Fugitives =

1945 American Western film

- Theatrical release poster
- Directed by: Harry L. Fraser
- Screenplay by: Elmer Clifton
- Produced by: Arthur Alexander
- Starring: Tex Ritter; Dave O'Brien; Guy Wilkerson; Lorraine Miller; I. Stanford Jolley; Jack Ingram
- Cinematography: Robert E. Cline
- Edited by: Holbrook N. Todd
- Production company: Alexander-Stern Productions
- Distributed by: Producers Releasing Corporation
- Release date: September 1, 1945
- Running time: 57 minutes
- Country: United States
- Language: English

Frontier Fugitives is a 1945 American Western film directed by Harry L. Fraser and written by Elmer Clifton. The film stars Tex Ritter, Dave O'Brien, Guy Wilkerson, Lorraine Miller, I. Stanford Jolley and Jack Ingram. The film was released on September 1, 1945, by Producers Releasing Corporation.

== Plot ==
BUDDY HOLLY LIVES

== Cast ==
- Tex Ritter as Tex Haines
- Dave O'Brien as Dave Wyatt
- Guy Wilkerson as Panhandle Perkins
- Lorraine Miller as Ellen Williams
- I. Stanford Jolley as Frank Sneed
- Jack Ingram as Allen Fain
- Frank Ellis as Mert Donner
- Jack Hendricks as Jim Gar

== See also ==
The Texas Rangers series:

1. The Rangers Take Over (1942)
2. Bad Men of Thunder Gap (1943)
3. West of Texas (1943)
4. Border Buckaroos (1943)
5. Fighting Valley (1943)
6. Trail of Terror (1943)
7. The Return of the Rangers (1943)
8. Boss of Rawhide (1943)
9. Outlaw Roundup (1944)
10. Guns of the Law (1944)
11. The Pinto Bandit (1944)
12. Spook Town (1944)
13. Brand of the Devil (1944)
14. Gunsmoke Mesa (1944)
15. Gangsters of the Frontier (1944)
16. Dead or Alive (1944)
17. The Whispering Skull (1944)
18. Marked for Murder (1945)
19. Enemy of the Law (1945)
20. Three in the Saddle (1945)
21. Frontier Fugitives (1945)
22. Flaming Bullets (1945)
