= Outlaw Roundup =

1944 film by Harry L. Fraser

- Theatrical release poster
- Directed by: Harry L. Fraser
- Screenplay by: Elmer Clifton
- Produced by: Alfred Stern
- Starring: Dave O'Brien; James Newill; Guy Wilkerson; Helen Chapman; Jack Ingram; I. Stanford Jolley
- Cinematography: Ira H. Morgan
- Edited by: Charles Henkel Jr.
- Production company: Alexander-Stern Productions
- Distributed by: Producers Releasing Corporation
- Release date: February 10, 1944
- Running time: 55 minutes
- Country: United States
- Language: English

Outlaw Roundup is a 1944 American Western film directed by Harry L. Fraser and written by Elmer Clifton. The film stars Dave O'Brien, James Newill, Guy Wilkerson, Helen Chapman, Jack Ingram and I. Stanford Jolley. The film was released on February 10, 1944, by Producers Releasing Corporation.

In the film, Newill sings "Someone Is Waiting", "Forget Me Not" and "When the Western Sun Is Sinking" by Speed Hansen.

== Cast ==
- Dave O'Brien as Tex Wyatt
- James Newill as Jim Steele
- Guy Wilkerson as Panhandle Perkins
- Helen Chapman as Ruth Randall
- Jack Ingram as Spade Norton
- I. Stanford Jolley as Red Hayden
- Charles King as Frank Harkins
- Reed Howes as Rod Laidlow
- Bud Osborne as Sheriff Jed Randall
- Frank Ellis as Sam Panzer
- Budd Buster as Dude Merrill

== See also ==
The Texas Rangers series:

1. The Rangers Take Over (1942)
2. Bad Men of Thunder Gap (1943)
3. West of Texas (1943)
4. Border Buckaroos (1943)
5. Fighting Valley (1943)
6. Trail of Terror (1943)
7. The Return of the Rangers (1943)
8. Boss of Rawhide (1943)
9. Outlaw Roundup (1944)
10. Guns of the Law (1944)
11. The Pinto Bandit (1944)
12. Spook Town (1944)
13. Brand of the Devil (1944)
14. Gunsmoke Mesa (1944)
15. Gangsters of the Frontier (1944)
16. Dead or Alive (1944)
17. The Whispering Skull (1944)
18. Marked for Murder (1945)
19. Enemy of the Law (1945)
20. Three in the Saddle (1945)
21. Frontier Fugitives (1945)
22. Flaming Bullets (1945)
