= Bad Men of Thunder Gap =

1943 film directed by Albert Herman

- Theatrical release poster
- Directed by: Albert Herman
- Screenplay by: Elmer Clifton
- Produced by: Alfred Stern; Arthur Alexander
- Starring: Dave O'Brien; James Newill; Guy Wilkerson; Janet Shaw; Jack Ingram; Charles King
- Cinematography: Robert E. Cline
- Edited by: Charles Henkel Jr.
- Production company: Alexander-Stern Productions
- Distributed by: Producers Releasing Corporation
- Release date: March 5, 1943
- Running time: 57 minutes
- Country: United States
- Language: English

Bad Men of Thunder Gap is a 1943 American Western film directed by Albert Herman and written by Elmer Clifton. The film stars Dave O'Brien, James Newill, Guy Wilkerson, Janet Shaw, Jack Ingram and Charles King. The film was released on March 5, 1943, by Producers Releasing Corporation.

In the film, Newill sings Carl Shrum's "Ride, Ride, Ride" and Tex Coe's "West Winds".

== Plot ==
Tex Wyatt is unfairly accused of murder, but escapes to join his ranger colleagues Jim Steele and Panhandle Perkins to track down the real criminals.

== Cast ==
- Dave O'Brien as Tex Wyatt
- James Newill as Jim Steele
- Guy Wilkerson as Panhandle Perkins
- Janet Shaw as Martha Stewart
- Jack Ingram as Ed Ransom
- Charles King as Pete Holman
- Michael Vallon as John Hobbs
- Lucille Vance as Matilda Matthews
- Tom London as Hank Turner
- I. Stanford Jolley as Bill Horne
- Bud Osborne as Clem
- Jimmy Aubrey as Frank Rand
- Cal Shrum as Accordion Player
- Robert Hoag as Fiddle Player
- Don Weston as Guitar Player

== See also ==
The Texas Rangers series:

1. The Rangers Take Over (1942)
2. Bad Men of Thunder Gap (1943)
3. West of Texas (1943)
4. Border Buckaroos (1943)
5. Fighting Valley (1943)
6. Trail of Terror (1943)
7. The Return of the Rangers (1943)
8. Boss of Rawhide (1943)
9. Outlaw Roundup (1944)
10. Guns of the Law (1944)
11. The Pinto Bandit (1944)
12. Spook Town (1944)
13. Brand of the Devil (1944)
14. Gunsmoke Mesa (1944)
15. Gangsters of the Frontier (1944)
16. Dead or Alive (1944)
17. The Whispering Skull (1944)
18. Marked for Murder (1945)
19. Enemy of the Law (1945)
20. Three in the Saddle (1945)
21. Frontier Fugitives (1945)
22. Flaming Bullets (1945)
