= Gunsmoke Mesa =

1944 film directed by Harry L. Fraser

- Theatrical release poster
- Directed by: Harry L. Fraser
- Screenplay by: Elmer Clifton
- Produced by: Arthur Alexander
- Starring: Dave O'Brien; James Newill; Guy Wilkerson; Patti McCarty; Jack Ingram; Kermit Maynard
- Cinematography: Ira H. Morgan
- Edited by: Charles Henkel Jr.
- Production company: Alexander-Stern Productions
- Distributed by: Producers Releasing Corporation
- Release date: September 1, 1944
- Running time: 59 minutes
- Country: United States
- Language: English

Gunsmoke Mesa is a 1944 American Western film directed by Harry L. Fraser and written by Elmer Clifton. The film stars Dave O'Brien, James Newill, Guy Wilkerson, Patti McCarty, Jack Ingram and Kermit Maynard. The film was released on September 1, 1944, by Producers Releasing Corporation.

The film was the last appearance in the "Texas Ranger" film series by James Newill, who left to do Sadie Thompson on Broadway and was replaced by Tex Ritter.

== Cast ==
- Dave O'Brien as Tex Wyatt
- James Newill as Jim Steele
- Guy Wilkerson as Panhandle Perkins
- Patti McCarty as Joan Royal
- Jack Ingram as Henry Black
- Kermit Maynard as Sam Sneed
- Robert Barron as Bill Moore
- Richard Alexander as Frank Lear
- Michael Vallon as Judge Plymouth
- Roy Brent as Deputy Mace Page
- Jack Rockwell as Sheriff Horner

== See also ==
The Texas Rangers series:

1. The Rangers Take Over (1942)
2. Bad Men of Thunder Gap (1943)
3. West of Texas (1943)
4. Border Buckaroos (1943)
5. Fighting Valley (1943)
6. Trail of Terror (1943)
7. The Return of the Rangers (1943)
8. Boss of Rawhide (1943)
9. Outlaw Roundup (1944)
10. Guns of the Law (1944)
11. The Pinto Bandit (1944)
12. Spook Town (1944)
13. Brand of the Devil (1944)
14. Gunsmoke Mesa (1944)
15. Gangsters of the Frontier (1944)
16. Dead or Alive (1944)
17. The Whispering Skull (1944)
18. Marked for Murder (1945)
19. Enemy of the Law (1945)
20. Three in the Saddle (1945)
21. Frontier Fugitives (1945)
22. Flaming Bullets (1945)
