= Trail of Terror =

1943 film

- Theatrical release poster
- Directed by: Oliver Drake
- Screenplay by: Oliver Drake
- Produced by: Alfred Stern; Arthur Alexander
- Starring: Dave O'Brien; James Newill; Guy Wilkerson; Patricia Knox; Jack Ingram; I. Stanford Jolley
- Cinematography: Ira H. Morgan
- Edited by: Charles Henkel Jr.
- Production company: Alexander-Stern Productions
- Distributed by: Producers Releasing Corporation
- Release date: September 7, 1943
- Running time: 63 minutes
- Country: United States
- Language: English

Trail of Terror is a 1943 American Western film written and directed by Oliver Drake. The film stars Dave O'Brien, James Newill, Guy Wilkerson, Patricia Knox, Jack Ingram and I. Stanford Jolley. The film was released on September 7, 1943, by Producers Releasing Corporation.

== Cast ==
- Dave O'Brien as Tex Wyatt / Curly Wyatt
- James Newill as Jim Steele
- Guy Wilkerson as Panhandle Perkins
- Patricia Knox as Belle Blaine
- Jack Ingram as Nevada Simmons
- I. Stanford Jolley as Hank
- Budd Buster as Monte
- Robert F. Hill as Captain Curtis
- Frank Ellis as Joe
- Kenne Duncan as Tom

== See also ==
The Texas Rangers series:

1. The Rangers Take Over (1942)
2. Bad Men of Thunder Gap (1943)
3. West of Texas (1943)
4. Border Buckaroos (1943)
5. Fighting Valley (1943)
6. Trail of Terror (1943)
7. The Return of the Rangers (1943)
8. Boss of Rawhide (1943)
9. Outlaw Roundup (1944)
10. Guns of the Law (1944)
11. The Pinto Bandit (1944)
12. Spook Town (1944)
13. Brand of the Devil (1944)
14. Gunsmoke Mesa (1944)
15. Gangsters of the Frontier (1944)
16. Dead or Alive (1944)
17. The Whispering Skull (1944)
18. Marked for Murder (1945)
19. Enemy of the Law (1945)
20. Three in the Saddle (1945)
21. Frontier Fugitives (1945)
22. Flaming Bullets (1945)
