= Marked for Murder =

1945 film by Elmer Clifton

- Directed by: Elmer Clifton
- Written by: Elmer Clifton (original screenplay)
- Produced by: Arthur Alexander (producer)
- Starring: See below
- Cinematography: Edward A. Kull
- Edited by: Holbrook N. Todd
- Distributed by: Producers Releasing Corporation
- Release date: February 8, 1945
- Running time: 58 minutes
- Country: United States
- Language: English

Marked for Murder is a 1945 American Western film written and directed by Elmer Clifton. The film stars Dave O'Brien, Tex Ritter and Guy Wilkerson, with Marilyn McConnell, Ed Cassidy and Henry Hall. The film was released on 8 February 1945, by Producers Releasing Corporation.

== Plot ==
The Texas Rangers try to manage a dispute between sheepherders and cattle ranchers.

== Cast ==
- Tex Ritter as Tex Haines
- Dave O'Brien as Texas Ranger Dave Wyatt
- Guy Wilkerson as Texas Ranger Panhandle Perkins
- Marilyn McConnell as Ruth Lane
- Ed Cassidy as Dick Vernon
- Henry Hall as Sheriff Jim Whitlock
- Charles King as Henchman Pete Magoo
- Jack Ingram as Sam Taylor
- Bob Kortman as Henchman
- The Milo Twins as Musicians

== Soundtrack ==
- Tex Ritter - "Long Time Gone" (Written by Tex Ritter and Frank Harford)
- Tex Ritter - "Tears of Regret" (Written by Don Weston)
- Milo Twins - "Great Grand-Dad"

== See also ==
The Texas Rangers series:

1. The Rangers Take Over (1942)
2. Bad Men of Thunder Gap (1943)
3. West of Texas (1943)
4. Border Buckaroos (1943)
5. Fighting Valley (1943)
6. Trail of Terror (1943)
7. The Return of the Rangers (1943)
8. Boss of Rawhide (1943)
9. Outlaw Roundup (1944)
10. Guns of the Law (1944)
11. The Pinto Bandit (1944)
12. Spook Town (1944)
13. Brand of the Devil (1944)
14. Gunsmoke Mesa (1944)
15. Gangsters of the Frontier (1944)
16. Dead or Alive (1944)
17. The Whispering Skull (1944)
18. Marked for Murder (1945)
19. Enemy of the Law (1945)
20. Three in the Saddle (1945)
21. Frontier Fugitives (1945)
22. Flaming Bullets (1945)
