= Three in the Saddle =

1945 film by Harry L. Fraser

- Theatrical release poster
- Directed by: Harry L. Fraser
- Screenplay by: Elmer Clifton
- Produced by: Arthur Alexander
- Starring: Tex Ritter; Dave O'Brien; Guy Wilkerson; Lorraine Miller; Charles King; Edward Howard
- Cinematography: Robert E. Cline
- Edited by: Holbrook N. Todd
- Production company: Alexander-Stern Productions
- Distributed by: Producers Releasing Corporation
- Release date: July 26, 1945
- Running time: 61 minutes
- Country: United States
- Language: English

Three in the Saddle is a 1945 American Western film directed by Harry L. Fraser and written by Elmer Clifton. The film stars Tex Ritter, Dave O'Brien, Guy Wilkerson, Lorraine Miller, Charles King and Edward Howard. The film was released on July 26, 1945, by Producers Releasing Corporation.

== Plot ==
Cowboy Tex Haines is forced to escape bad-guys Bart Rawlins and his gang try to accost him for trespassing while Haines is rounding up some horses on Peggy Barlow's (his boss), land. Rawlins claims the land belongs to John Rankin's stage line, and tries to punctuate that with his six-shooter. Haines is aided in his escape by Dave Wyatt, and eventually Wyatt's partner, Panhandle Perkins. Haines offers Wyatt and "Panhandle" a job at Barlow's ranch, the Tin Cup, after explaining how Rawlins and Rankin have been strong-arming local ranchers by violently claiming land for the stage line.

Back at the Tin Cup ranch Rankin is bullying Barlow by claiming that a state-sanction gives him legal access to her land, and offers to buy the entire ranch for $10,000. Peggy Barlow refuses to sell, even after being threatened with a lawsuit. When local ranchers plead for help from the Texas Rangers, and get none, Haines wants to administer some vigilante justice, but Wyatt tries to advise him against it. A rancher's meeting at the Jim Manning trading post is darkened by a local deputy when he serves Barlow with an eviction notice. Her ranch foreman, Dan Brown, tries to produce the petition the ranchers hope to present to governor, but Rankin's henchman, Bill Dugan, draws and murders Brown. Haines then draws and kills Brown. Manning publicly condemns the violence, but privately hatches a plan with Rankin to get rid of Haines.

The next day Manning spins his tale of events to the sheriff, who then heads out to arrest Haines for the murder of Bill Dugan. Haines escapes, and receives support and food from Panhandle and Barlow. Haines devises a plan to ambush Rankin during Rankin's return trip from the capital. Panhandle and Wyatt, who are secretly Texas Rangers, thwart the plan by stopping Rankin's stage ahead of schedule. Wyatt confiscates Rankin's papers which detail a plan to sell all the ranchers land with the help of an unnamed partner to a large land syndicate. Panhandle begins to investigate, while Wyatt returns to talk to Peggy Barlow. Haines is with her, and Wyatt tries to make a citizen's arrest when Haines refuses to return to his hideout, but Rawlins shows up to arrest him. Wyatt then reveals that he is a Texas Ranger and forces Rawlins to stand down. Wyatt declares his intent to have a grand jury investigate Rankin. Rawlins defers to Wyatt, but rushes back to town to warn Rankin.

Rankin and Manning think they can outmaneuver everyone and still manage to evict Barlow, and collect on the land deal, and flee before the grand jury meeting. Dimwitted Rawlins is ordered to kill Panhandle, who has now been exposed, but Rawlins is tricked arrested. Haines joins Panhandle and Wyatt, and with a little help from the sheriff head to the Tin Cup to save Barlow. Manning and Rankin try to escape, but are eventually captured and arrested. Wyatt and Panhandle then bid farewell to Haines and Barlow, leaving the later pair to attend to the Tin Cup, and perhaps a more interesting future.

== Cast ==
- Tex Ritter as Tex Haines
- Dave O'Brien as Dave Wyatt
- Guy Wilkerson as Panhandle Perkins
- Lorraine Miller as Peggy Barlow
- Charles King as Bart Rawlings
- Edward Howard as John Rankin
- Ed Cassidy as Jim Manning
- Bud Osborne as Sheriff Backley

== See also ==
The Texas Rangers series:

1. The Rangers Take Over (1942)
2. Bad Men of Thunder Gap (1943)
3. West of Texas (1943)
4. Border Buckaroos (1943)
5. Fighting Valley (1943)
6. Trail of Terror (1943)
7. The Return of the Rangers (1943)
8. Boss of Rawhide (1943)
9. Outlaw Roundup (1944)
10. Guns of the Law (1944)
11. The Pinto Bandit (1944)
12. Spook Town (1944)
13. Brand of the Devil (1944)
14. Gunsmoke Mesa (1944)
15. Gangsters of the Frontier (1944)
16. Dead or Alive (1944)
17. The Whispering Skull (1944)
18. Marked for Murder (1945)
19. Enemy of the Law (1945)
20. Three in the Saddle (1945)
21. Frontier Fugitives (1945)
22. Flaming Bullets (1945)
