= The Return of the Rangers =

1943 American western film

- Theatrical release poster
- Directed by: Elmer Clifton
- Screenplay by: Elmer Clifton
- Produced by: Arthur Alexander
- Starring: Dave O'Brien; James Newill; Guy Wilkerson; Nell O'Day; Glenn Strange; Emmett Lynn
- Cinematography: Robert E. Cline
- Edited by: Charles Henkel Jr.
- Production company: Alexander-Stern Productions
- Distributed by: Producers Releasing Corporation
- Release date: October 26, 1943
- Running time: 60 minutes
- Country: United States
- Language: English

The Return of the Rangers is a 1943 American Western film written and directed by Elmer Clifton. The film stars Dave O'Brien, James Newill, Guy Wilkerson, Nell O'Day, Glenn Strange and Emmett Lynn. The film was released on October 26, 1943, by Producers Releasing Corporation.

== Cast ==
- Dave O'Brien as Tex Wyatt
- James Newill as Jim Steele
- Guy Wilkerson as Panhandle Perkins
- Nell O'Day as Anne Miller
- Glenn Strange as Frank Martin
- Emmett Lynn as Sheriff Summers
- I. Stanford Jolley as Don Bolton
- Robert Barron as Dr. Robert Vanner
- Henry Hall as Judge Ezra Dean
- Harry Harvey Sr. as Philip Dobbs

== See also ==
The Texas Rangers series:

1. The Rangers Take Over (1942)
2. Bad Men of Thunder Gap (1943)
3. West of Texas (1943)
4. Border Buckaroos (1943)
5. Fighting Valley (1943)
6. Trail of Terror (1943)
7. The Return of the Rangers (1943)
8. Boss of Rawhide (1943)
9. Outlaw Roundup (1944)
10. Guns of the Law (1944)
11. The Pinto Bandit (1944)
12. Spook Town (1944)
13. Brand of the Devil (1944)
14. Gunsmoke Mesa (1944)
15. Gangsters of the Frontier (1944)
16. Dead or Alive (1944)
17. The Whispering Skull (1944)
18. Marked for Murder (1945)
19. Enemy of the Law (1945)
20. Three in the Saddle (1945)
21. Frontier Fugitives (1945)
22. Flaming Bullets (1945)
