= The Rangers Take Over =

1942 film by Albert Herman

- Theatrical release poster
- Directed by: Albert Herman
- Screenplay by: Elmer Clifton (original story and screenplay)
- Produced by: Alfred Stern and Arthur Alexander
- Starring: Dave (Tex) O'Brien; Jim Newill; Iris Meredith; Guy Wilkerson; Cal Shrum's 'Rhythm Rangers'
- Cinematography: Robert Cline
- Edited by: Charles Henkel, Jr.
- Music by: Lee Zahler (musical director)
- Production company: Alexander-Stern Productions
- Distributed by: Producers Releasing Corporation
- Release date: December 25, 1942
- Running time: 60 minutes
- Country: United States
- Language: English

The Rangers Take Over is a 1942 American Western film directed by Albert Herman and written by Elmer Clifton. The film stars Dave (Tex) O'Brien, Jim Newill, Guy Wilkerson, Iris Meredith and Cal Shrum and his "Rhythm Rangers". The film was released on December 25, 1942, by Producers Releasing Corporation.

The film is the first of PRC's 22-film "Texas Rangers" series starring Dave (Tex) O'Brien, Jim Newill and Guy Wilkerson.

Jim Newill sings three songs in the film co-written by Newill and O'Brien: "The Rangers Take Over", "High in the Saddle" and "Campfire on the Prairie".

== Plot ==
Tex Wyatt, a new recruit, is assigned by his father to investigate cattle rustlings. He's thrown off the force for disobeying orders, and goes undercover with the rustler gang. Working with rangers Jim Steele and Panhandle Perkins, he busts the gang, and earns his spot on the force again.

== Cast ==
- Dave (Tex) O'Brien as Tex Wyatt
- Jim Newill as Jim Steele
- Guy Wilkerson as Panhandle Perkins
- Iris Meredith as Jean Lorin
- Forrest Taylor as Capt. Wyatt
- I. Stanford Jolley as Rance Blair
- Charles King as Kip Lane
- Carl Matthews as Weir Slocum
- Harry Harvey as Bill Summers
- Lynton Brent as Block Nelson
- Bud Osborne as Pete Dawson
- Cal Shrum and his "Rhythm Rangers"

== See also ==
The Texas Rangers series:

1. The Rangers Take Over (1942)
2. Bad Men of Thunder Gap (1943)
3. West of Texas (1943)
4. Border Buckaroos (1943)
5. Fighting Valley (1943)
6. Trail of Terror (1943)
7. The Return of the Rangers (1943)
8. Boss of Rawhide (1943)
9. Outlaw Roundup (1944)
10. Guns of the Law (1944)
11. The Pinto Bandit (1944)
12. Spook Town (1944)
13. Brand of the Devil (1944)
14. Gunsmoke Mesa (1944)
15. Gangsters of the Frontier (1944)
16. Dead or Alive (1944)
17. The Whispering Skull (1944)
18. Marked for Murder (1945)
19. Enemy of the Law (1945)
20. Three in the Saddle (1945)
21. Frontier Fugitives (1945)
22. Flaming Bullets (1945)
