= The Whispering Skull (film) =

1944 film by Elmer Clifton

- Theatrical release poster
- Directed by: Elmer Clifton
- Screenplay by: Harry L. Fraser
- Produced by: Arthur Alexander
- Starring: Tex Ritter; Dave O'Brien; Guy Wilkerson; Denny Burke; I. Stanford Jolley; Henry Hall
- Cinematography: Edward A. Kull
- Edited by: Hugh Winn
- Production company: Alexander-Stern Productions
- Distributed by: Producers Releasing Corporation
- Release date: December 29, 1944
- Running time: 56 minutes
- Country: United States
- Language: English

The Whispering Skull is a 1944 American Western film, directed by Elmer Clifton and written by Harry L. Fraser. The film stars: Tex Ritter, Dave O'Brien, Guy Wilkerson, Denny Burke, I. Stanford Jolley and Henry Hall. The film was released on December 29, 1944, by Producers Releasing Corporation.

== Plot ==
In the old west, someone is killing people in the middle of the night. Multiple murders by a mysterious killer known as "the Whispering Skull". It's up to Tex Haines, played by good-guy Tex Ritter, to lead the Texas Rangers and capture the midnight marauder.

== Cast ==
- Tex Ritter as Tex Haines
- Dave O'Brien as Dave Wyatt
- Guy Wilkerson as Panhandle Perkins
- Denny Burke as Ellen Jackson
- I. Stanford Jolley as Duke Walters
- Henry Hall as Judge Polk
- George Morrell as Sheriff Marvin Jackson
- Ed Cassidy as Doc Humphrey
- Bob Kortman as Joe Carter
- Wen Wright as Mike Coram

== See also ==
The Texas Rangers series:

1. The Rangers Take Over (1942)
2. Bad Men of Thunder Gap (1943)
3. West of Texas (1943)
4. Border Buckaroos (1943)
5. Fighting Valley (1943)
6. Trail of Terror (1943)
7. The Return of the Rangers (1943)
8. Boss of Rawhide (1943)
9. Outlaw Roundup (1944)
10. Guns of the Law (1944)
11. The Pinto Bandit (1944)
12. Spook Town (1944)
13. Brand of the Devil (1944)
14. Gunsmoke Mesa (1944)
15. Gangsters of the Frontier (1944)
16. Dead or Alive (1944)
17. The Whispering Skull (1944)
18. Marked for Murder (1945)
19. Enemy of the Law (1945)
20. Three in the Saddle (1945)
21. Frontier Fugitives (1945)
22. Flaming Bullets (1945)
