= West of Texas =

1943 film by Oliver Drake

- Directed by: Oliver Drake
- Screenplay by: Oliver Drake
- Produced by: Alfred Stern; Arthur Alexander
- Starring: Dave O'Brien; James Newill; Guy Wilkerson; Frances Gladwin; Henry Hall; Marilyn Hare
- Cinematography: Ira H. Morgan
- Edited by: Charles Henkel Jr.
- Production company: Alexander-Stern Productions
- Distributed by: Producers Releasing Corporation
- Release date: May 10, 1943
- Running time: 58 minutes
- Country: United States
- Language: English

West of Texas is a 1943 American Western film written and directed by Oliver Drake. The film stars Dave O'Brien, James Newill, Guy Wilkerson, Frances Gladwin, Henry Hall and Marilyn Hare. The film was released on May 10, 1943, by Producers Releasing Corporation.

Newill and O'Brien composed and sang three songs in the movie: "Whistle a Song," "El Lobo," and "Tired of Rambling."

== Plot ==
The three Texas Rangers help a rancher falsely accused of sabotaging the railroad.

== Cast ==
- Dave O'Brien as Tex Wyatt
- James Newill as Jim Steele
- Guy Wilkerson as Panhandle Perkins
- Frances Gladwin as Marie Monette
- Henry Hall as Bent Yaeger
- Marilyn Hare as Ellen Yaeger
- Robert Barron as Bart Calloway
- Jack Ingram as Blackie
- Jack Rockwell as Gabe Jones
- Tom London as Steve Conlon
- Art Fowler as Clem

== See also ==
The Texas Rangers series:

1. The Rangers Take Over (1942)
2. Bad Men of Thunder Gap (1943)
3. West of Texas (1943)
4. Border Buckaroos (1943)
5. Fighting Valley (1943)
6. Trail of Terror (1943)
7. The Return of the Rangers (1943)
8. Boss of Rawhide (1943)
9. Outlaw Roundup (1944)
10. Guns of the Law (1944)
11. The Pinto Bandit (1944)
12. Spook Town (1944)
13. Brand of the Devil (1944)
14. Gunsmoke Mesa (1944)
15. Gangsters of the Frontier (1944)
16. Dead or Alive (1944)
17. The Whispering Skull (1944)
18. Marked for Murder (1945)
19. Enemy of the Law (1945)
20. Three in the Saddle (1945)
21. Frontier Fugitives (1945)
22. Flaming Bullets (1945)
