= Enemy of the Law =

1945 film

- Theatrical release poster
- Directed by: Harry L. Fraser
- Screenplay by: Harry L. Fraser
- Produced by: Arthur Alexander
- Starring: Tex Ritter; Dave O'Brien; Guy Wilkerson; Kay Hughes; Jack Ingram; Charles King
- Cinematography: Jack Greenhalgh
- Edited by: Holbrook N. Todd
- Production company: Alexander-Stern Productions
- Distributed by: Producers Releasing Corporation
- Release date: May 7, 1945
- Running time: 59 minutes
- Country: United States
- Language: English

Enemy of the Law is a 1945 American Western film written and directed by Harry L. Fraser. The film stars Tex Ritter, Dave O'Brien, Guy Wilkerson, Kay Hughes, Jack Ingram and Charles King. The film was released on May 7, 1945, by Producers Releasing Corporation.

== Cast ==
- Tex Ritter as Tex Haines
- Dave O'Brien as Dave Wyatt
- Guy Wilkerson as Panhandle Perkins
- Kay Hughes as Ruby Lawson
- Jack Ingram as Steve Martin
- Charles King as Charley Gray
- Frank Ellis as Red
- Kermit Maynard as Mike
- Henry Hall as Sheriff

== See also ==
The Texas Rangers series:

1. The Rangers Take Over (1942)
2. Bad Men of Thunder Gap (1943)
3. West of Texas (1943)
4. Border Buckaroos (1943)
5. Fighting Valley (1943)
6. Trail of Terror (1943)
7. The Return of the Rangers (1943)
8. Boss of Rawhide (1943)
9. Outlaw Roundup (1944)
10. Guns of the Law (1944)
11. The Pinto Bandit (1944)
12. Spook Town (1944)
13. Brand of the Devil (1944)
14. Gunsmoke Mesa (1944)
15. Gangsters of the Frontier (1944)
16. Dead or Alive (1944)
17. The Whispering Skull (1944)
18. Marked for Murder (1945)
19. Enemy of the Law (1945)
20. Three in the Saddle (1945)
21. Frontier Fugitives (1945)
22. Flaming Bullets (1945)
