= Boss of Rawhide =

1943 film directed by Elmer Clifton

- Theatrical release poster
- Directed by: Elmer Clifton
- Screenplay by: Elmer Clifton
- Produced by: Alfred Stern
- Starring: Dave O'Brien; James Newill; Guy Wilkerson; Nell O'Day; Ed Cassidy; Jack Ingram
- Cinematography: Robert E. Cline
- Edited by: Charles Henkel Jr.
- Production company: Alexander-Stern Productions
- Distributed by: Producers Releasing Corporation
- Release date: November 20, 1943
- Running time: 57 minutes
- Country: United States
- Language: English

Boss of Rawhide is a 1943 American Western film written and directed by Elmer Clifton. The film stars Dave O'Brien, James Newill, Guy Wilkerson, Nell O'Day, Ed Cassidy and Jack Ingram. The film was released on November 20, 1943, by Producers Releasing Corporation.

== Plot ==
The boss of the Rawhide district of Texas is extorting farmers and small ranchers as well as murdering them with a sniper rifle when they do not pay. The Texas Rangers enter Rawhide to bring justice undercover; Tex as a tramp and Jim and Panhandle as members of a minstrel show.

== Cast ==
- Dave O'Brien as Tex Wyatt
- James Newill as Jim Steele
- Guy Wilkerson as Panhandle Perkins
- Nell O'Day as Mary Colby
- Ed Cassidy as Henry Colby
- Jack Ingram as Sam Barrett
- Billy Bletcher as Jed Bones
- Charles King as Frank Hade
- George Chesebro as Joe Gordon
- Robert F. Hill as Captain John Wyatt
- Dan White as Minstrel
- Lucille Vance as Widow Perriwinkle

== See also ==
The Texas Rangers series:

1. The Rangers Take Over (1942)
2. Bad Men of Thunder Gap (1943)
3. West of Texas (1943)
4. Border Buckaroos (1943)
5. Fighting Valley (1943)
6. Trail of Terror (1943)
7. The Return of the Rangers (1943)
8. Boss of Rawhide (1943)
9. Outlaw Roundup (1944)
10. Guns of the Law (1944)
11. The Pinto Bandit (1944)
12. Spook Town (1944)
13. Brand of the Devil (1944)
14. Gunsmoke Mesa (1944)
15. Gangsters of the Frontier (1944)
16. Dead or Alive (1944)
17. The Whispering Skull (1944)
18. Marked for Murder (1945)
19. Enemy of the Law (1945)
20. Three in the Saddle (1945)
21. Frontier Fugitives (1945)
22. Flaming Bullets (1945)
