= The Pinto Bandit =

1944 film

- Theatrical release poster
- Directed by: Elmer Clifton
- Screenplay by: Elmer Clifton
- Produced by: Alfred Stern
- Starring: Dave O'Brien; James Newill; Guy Wilkerson; Mady Lawrence; James Martin; Jack Ingram
- Cinematography: Edward A. Kull
- Edited by: Charles Henkel Jr.
- Production company: Alexander-Stern Production
- Distributed by: Producers Releasing Corporation
- Release date: April 27, 1944
- Running time: 56 minutes
- Country: United States
- Language: English

The Pinto Bandit is a 1944 American Western film written and directed by Elmer Clifton. The film stars Dave O'Brien, James Newill, Guy Wilkerson, Mady Lawrence, James Martin and Jack Ingram. The film was released on April 27, 1944, by Producers Releasing Corporation.

== Cast ==
- Dave O'Brien as Tex Wyatt
- James Newill as Jim Steele
- Guy Wilkerson as Panhandle Perkins
- Mady Lawrence as Kitty Collins
- James Martin as Walter Collins
- Jack Ingram as Tom Torrant
- Ed Cassidy as Doc Garson
- Budd Buster as P.T. Heneberry
- Karl Hackett as Sheriff Bisbee
- Bob Kortman as Draw Dudley
- Charles King as Spur Sneely

== See also ==
The Texas Rangers series:

1. The Rangers Take Over (1942)
2. Bad Men of Thunder Gap (1943)
3. West of Texas (1943)
4. Border Buckaroos (1943)
5. Fighting Valley (1943)
6. Trail of Terror (1943)
7. The Return of the Rangers (1943)
8. Boss of Rawhide (1943)
9. Outlaw Roundup (1944)
10. Guns of the Law (1944)
11. The Pinto Bandit (1944)
12. Spook Town (1944)
13. Brand of the Devil (1944)
14. Gunsmoke Mesa (1944)
15. Gangsters of the Frontier (1944)
16. Dead or Alive (1944)
17. The Whispering Skull (1944)
18. Marked for Murder (1945)
19. Enemy of the Law (1945)
20. Three in the Saddle (1945)
21. Frontier Fugitives (1945)
22. Flaming Bullets (1945)
