= Guns of the Law =

1944 film by Elmer Clifton

- Directed by: Elmer Clifton
- Written by: Elmer Clifton
- Produced by: Arthur Alexander
- Starring: See below
- Cinematography: Edward A. Kull
- Edited by: Charles Henkel Jr.
- Distributed by: Producers Releasing Corporation
- Release date: March 31, 1944
- Running time: 56 minutes
- Country: United States
- Language: English

Guns of the Law is a 1944 American Western film written and directed by Elmer Clifton. The film stars Dave O'Brien, James Newill and Guy Wilkerson, with Jennifer Holt, Budd Buster and Charles King. The film was released on 31 March 1944, by Producers Releasing Corporation.

== Cast ==
- Dave O'Brien as Tex Wyatt
- James Newill as Jim Steele
- Guy Wilkerson as Panhandle Perkins
- Jennifer Holt as Lillian Wilkins
- Budd Buster as Jed Wilkins
- Charles King as Kendall Lowther
- Jack Ingram as Surveyor Sam Brisco
- Bob Kortman as Joe Hyslop
- Robert Barron as Henchman Dan Tyndall
- Frank McCarroll as Henchman Tom Binns

Bud Osborne, Slim Whitaker and Dan White appear uncredited.

== See also ==
The Texas Rangers series:

1. The Rangers Take Over (1942)
2. Bad Men of Thunder Gap (1943)
3. West of Texas (1943)
4. Border Buckaroos (1943)
5. Fighting Valley (1943)
6. Trail of Terror (1943)
7. The Return of the Rangers (1943)
8. Boss of Rawhide (1943)
9. Outlaw Roundup (1944)
10. Guns of the Law (1944)
11. The Pinto Bandit (1944)
12. Spook Town (1944)
13. Brand of the Devil (1944)
14. Gunsmoke Mesa (1944)
15. Gangsters of the Frontier (1944)
16. Dead or Alive (1944)
17. The Whispering Skull (1944)
18. Marked for Murder (1945)
19. Enemy of the Law (1945)
20. Three in the Saddle (1945)
21. Frontier Fugitives (1945)
22. Flaming Bullets (1945)
