= Brand of the Devil =

1944 film by Harry L. Fraser

- Theatrical poster
- Directed by: Harry L. Fraser
- Written by: Elmer Clifton (screenplay and story)
- Produced by: Arthur Alexander (producer); Alfred Stern (associate producer)
- Starring: See below
- Cinematography: Edward A. Kull
- Edited by: Charles Henkel Jr.
- Music by: Lee Zahler
- Distributed by: Producers Releasing Corporation
- Release date: July 30, 1944
- Running time: 57 minutes
- Country: United States
- Language: English

Brand of the Devil is a 1944 American Western film written by Elmer Clifton and directed by Harry L. Fraser. The film stars Dave O'Brien, James Newill and Guy Wilkerson, with Ellen Hall, I. Stanford Jolley and Charles King. The film was released on July 30, 1944, by Producers Releasing Corporation.

== Plot ==
A female ranch owner is losing cattle to a gang of rustlers called The Devil's Brand. She turns to the Texas Rangers for help, and they send in three Rangers undercover to bring the rustlers to justice.

== Cast ==
- Dave O'Brien as Tex Wyatt
- James Newill as Jim Steel
- Guy Wilkerson as Panhandle, alias Brand McGee
- Ellen Hall as Molly Dawson
- I. Stanford Jolley as Jack Varno (owner, Golden Ace)
- Charles King as Bucko Lynn – Devil's Brand Gang
- Reed Howes as Duke Cutter – Devil's Brand Gang
- Budd Buster as Henry Wilburn – Molly's Foreman
- Karl Hackett as Jeff Palin (Sheriff in credits)
- Kermit Maynard as Gripper Joe – Devil's Brand Gang
- Ed Cassidy as Sheriff Parker (character credited as Jeff Palin)

== See also ==
The Texas Rangers series:

1. The Rangers Take Over (1942)
2. Bad Men of Thunder Gap (1943)
3. West of Texas (1943)
4. Border Buckaroos (1943)
5. Fighting Valley (1943)
6. Trail of Terror (1943)
7. The Return of the Rangers (1943)
8. Boss of Rawhide (1943)
9. Outlaw Roundup (1944)
10. Guns of the Law (1944)
11. The Pinto Bandit (1944)
12. Spook Town (1944)
13. Brand of the Devil (1944)
14. Gunsmoke Mesa (1944)
15. Gangsters of the Frontier (1944)
16. Dead or Alive (1944)
17. The Whispering Skull (1944)
18. Marked for Murder (1945)
19. Enemy of the Law (1945)
20. Three in the Saddle (1945)
21. Frontier Fugitives (1945)
22. Flaming Bullets (1945)
