= Gangsters of the Frontier =

1944 film by Elmer Clifton

- Original film poster
- Directed by: Elmer Clifton
- Written by: Elmer Clifton
- Produced by: Arthur Alexander; Alfred Stern
- Starring: See below
- Cinematography: Robert E. Cline
- Edited by: Charles Henkel Jr.
- Distributed by: Producers Releasing Corporation
- Release date: 22 September 1944
- Running time: 56 minutes
- Country: United States
- Language: English

Gangsters of the Frontier (also known as Raiders of the Frontier in the United Kingdom) is a 1944 American Western film written and directed by Elmer Clifton. The film stars Dave O'Brien, Tex Ritter and Guy Wilkerson, with Patti McCarty, Harry Harvey and Betty Miles. The film was released on 22 September 1944, by Producers Releasing Corporation.

The fifteenth of the Texas Rangers film series, the film is regarded as a metaphor for World War II as a fascist-type gang enslaves a town.

This film was the first of the "Texas Rangers" series to feature Tex Ritter, who replaced James Newill after 14 movies.

In the film, Tex Ritter sings "Please Remember Me" by Ritter and Robert McGimsey, and "He's Gone Up the Trail" and "Ride, Ranger, Ride" by Tim Spencer.

== Cast ==
- Tex Ritter as Tex Haines
- Dave O'Brien as Texas Ranger Dave Wyatt
- Guy Wilkerson as Panhandle Perkins
- Patti McCarty as Jane Deering
- Harry Harvey as Mayor Frank Merritt
- Betty Miles as Mrs. Frank Merritt
- I. Stanford Jolley as Bart Kern
- Marshall Reed as Rad Kern
- Charles King as Henchman
- Clarke Stevens as Henchman Shade

== See also ==
The Texas Rangers series:

1. The Rangers Take Over (1942)
2. Bad Men of Thunder Gap (1943)
3. West of Texas (1943)
4. Border Buckaroos (1943)
5. Fighting Valley (1943)
6. Trail of Terror (1943)
7. The Return of the Rangers (1943)
8. Boss of Rawhide (1943)
9. Outlaw Roundup (1944)
10. Guns of the Law (1944)
11. The Pinto Bandit (1944)
12. Spook Town (1944)
13. Brand of the Devil (1944)
14. Gunsmoke Mesa (1944)
15. Gangsters of the Frontier (1944)
16. Dead or Alive (1944)
17. The Whispering Skull (1944)
18. Marked for Murder (1945)
19. Enemy of the Law (1945)
20. Three in the Saddle (1945)
21. Frontier Fugitives (1945)
22. Flaming Bullets (1945)
