= Flaming Bullets =

1945 film

- Theatrical release poster
- Directed by: Harry L. Fraser
- Screenplay by: Harry L. Fraser
- Produced by: Arthur Alexander
- Starring: Tex Ritter; Dave O'Brien; Guy Wilkerson; Patricia Knox; Charles King; I. Stanford Jolley
- Cinematography: Robert E. Cline
- Edited by: Holbrook N. Todd
- Production company: Alexander-Stern Productions
- Distributed by: Producers Releasing Corporation
- Release date: October 15, 1945
- Running time: 59 minutes
- Country: United States
- Language: English

Flaming Bullets is a 1945 American Western film written and directed by Harry L. Fraser. The film, the final of PRC's Texas Rangers film series, stars Tex Ritter, Dave O'Brien, Guy Wilkerson, Patricia Knox, Charles King as comedy relief and I. Stanford Jolley. The film was released on October 15, 1945, by Producers Releasing Corporation.

== Cast ==
- Tex Ritter as Tex Haines
- Dave O'Brien as Dave Wyatt / Steve Carson
- Guy Wilkerson as Panhandle Perkins
- Patricia Knox as Belle
- Charles King as Porky Smith
- I. Stanford Jolley as Sid Tolliver
- Bob Duncan as Eddie
- Bud Osborne as Town Marshal

== See also ==
The Texas Rangers series:

1. The Rangers Take Over (1942)
2. Bad Men of Thunder Gap (1943)
3. West of Texas (1943)
4. Border Buckaroos (1943)
5. Fighting Valley (1943)
6. Trail of Terror (1943)
7. The Return of the Rangers (1943)
8. Boss of Rawhide (1943)
9. Outlaw Roundup (1944)
10. Guns of the Law (1944)
11. The Pinto Bandit (1944)
12. Spook Town (1944)
13. Brand of the Devil (1944)
14. Gunsmoke Mesa (1944)
15. Gangsters of the Frontier (1944)
16. Dead or Alive (1944)
17. The Whispering Skull (1944)
18. Marked for Murder (1945)
19. Enemy of the Law (1945)
20. Three in the Saddle (1945)
21. Frontier Fugitives (1945)
22. Flaming Bullets (1945)
