= Border Buckaroos =

1943 film

- Original film poster
- Directed by: Oliver Drake
- Written by: Oliver Drake
- Produced by: Arthur Alexander; Alfred Stern
- Starring: James Newill
- Cinematography: Ira H. Morgan
- Edited by: Charles Henkel Jr.
- Music by: Lee Zahler
- Distributed by: Producers Releasing Corporation
- Release date: June 15, 1943
- Running time: 60 minutes
- Country: United States
- Language: English

Border Buckaroos is a 1943 American Western film written and directed by Oliver Drake. The fourth of Producers Releasing Corporation Texas Rangers film series, the film was shot at Corriganville movie ranch, and released on June 15, 1943.

== Plot ==
A trio of Texas Rangers impersonate a gunslinger for hire and a co-inheritor of a ranch with the goal to "play both ends against the middle" to solve a murder of a rancher.

== Cast ==
- James Newill as Ranger Jim Steel
- Dave O'Brien as Ranger Dave 'Tex' O'Brien
- Guy Wilkerson as Ranger Panhandle Perkins
- Christine McIntyre as Betty Clark
- Eleanor Counts as Marge Leonard
- Jack Ingram as Cole Melford
- Ethan Laidlaw as Hank Dugan
- Charles King as Rance Daggett
- Michael Vallon as Lawyer Seth Higgins
- Kenne Duncan as Tom Bancroft
- Reed Howes as Trigger Farley
- Bud Osborne as Stagecoach Driver
- Slim Whitaker as Sheriff McAllister

== Soundtrack ==
- Stay on the Right Trail

Written by Dave O'Brien and James Newill
Sung by James Newill

- Driftin'

Written by Dave O'Brien and James Newill
Sung by James Newill

- You're Here To Stay

Written by Dave O'Brien and James Newill
Sung by James Newill

== See also ==
The Texas Rangers series:

1. The Rangers Take Over (1942)
2. Bad Men of Thunder Gap (1943)
3. West of Texas (1943)
4. Border Buckaroos (1943)
5. Fighting Valley (1943)
6. Trail of Terror (1943)
7. The Return of the Rangers (1943)
8. Boss of Rawhide (1943)
9. Outlaw Roundup (1944)
10. Guns of the Law (1944)
11. The Pinto Bandit (1944)
12. Spook Town (1944)
13. Brand of the Devil (1944)
14. Gunsmoke Mesa (1944)
15. Gangsters of the Frontier (1944)
16. Dead or Alive (1944)
17. The Whispering Skull (1944)
18. Marked for Murder (1945)
19. Enemy of the Law (1945)
20. Three in the Saddle (1945)
21. Frontier Fugitives (1945)
22. Flaming Bullets (1945)
