= Spook Town =

1944 film by Elmer Clifton

- Directed by: Elmer Clifton
- Written by: Elmer Clifton (writer)
- Produced by: Arthur Alexander (producer)
- Starring: See below
- Cinematography: Robert E. Cline
- Edited by: Charles Henkel Jr.
- Music by: Lee Zahler
- Distributed by: Producers Releasing Corporation
- Release date: 3 June 1944
- Running time: 59 minutes
- Country: United States
- Language: English

Spook Town is a 1944 American Western film written and directed by Elmer Clifton. The film stars Dave O'Brien, James Newill and Guy Wilkerson, with Mady Lawrence, Dick Curtis and Harry Harvey. The film was released on 3 June 1944, by Producers Releasing Corporation.

== Plot ==
The Texas Rangers investigate a town that's being terrorized by ghosts.

== Cast ==
- Dave O'Brien as Texas Ranger Tex
- James Newill as Texas Ranger Jim
- Guy Wilkerson as Texas Ranger Panhandle
- Mady Lawrence as Lucy Warren
- Dick Curtis as Sam Benson
- Harry Harvey as Drywash Thompson
- Ed Cassidy as Ranger Capt. Wyatt
- Charles King as Trigger
- Robert Barron as Kurt Fabian
- Richard Alexander as Henchman

== Soundtrack ==
- James Newill - "Sleepy Hollow" (Written by Dave O'Brien and James Newill)
- James Newill - "El Lobo" (Written by Dave O'Brien and James Newill)

== See also ==
The Texas Rangers series:

1. The Rangers Take Over (1942)
2. Bad Men of Thunder Gap (1943)
3. West of Texas (1943)
4. Border Buckaroos (1943)
5. Fighting Valley (1943)
6. Trail of Terror (1943)
7. The Return of the Rangers (1943)
8. Boss of Rawhide (1943)
9. Outlaw Roundup (1944)
10. Guns of the Law (1944)
11. The Pinto Bandit (1944)
12. Spook Town (1944)
13. Brand of the Devil (1944)
14. Gunsmoke Mesa (1944)
15. Gangsters of the Frontier (1944)
16. Dead or Alive (1944)
17. The Whispering Skull (1944)
18. Marked for Murder (1945)
19. Enemy of the Law (1945)
20. Three in the Saddle (1945)
21. Frontier Fugitives (1945)
22. Flaming Bullets (1945)
