= Fighting Valley =

1943 film by Oliver Drake

- Theatrical release poster
- Directed by: Oliver Drake
- Screenplay by: Oliver Drake
- Produced by: Alfred Stern; Arthur Alexander
- Starring: Dave O'Brien; James Newill; Guy Wilkerson; Patti McCarty; John Merton; Robert Bice
- Cinematography: Ira H. Morgan
- Edited by: Charles Henkel Jr.
- Production company: Alexander-Stern Productions
- Distributed by: Producers Releasing Corporation
- Release date: August 8, 1943
- Running time: 60 minutes
- Country: United States
- Language: English

Fighting Valley is a 1943 American Western film written and directed by Oliver Drake. The film stars Dave O'Brien, James Newill, Guy Wilkerson, Patti McCarty, John Merton and Robert Bice. The film was released on August 8, 1943, by Producers Releasing Corporation.

== Plot ==
The Rangers investigate the theft of ore from a smelting mine.

== Cast ==
- Dave O'Brien as Tex Wyatt
- James Newill as Jim Steele
- Guy Wilkerson as Panhandle Perkins
- Patti McCarty as Joan Manning
- John Merton as Dan Wakely
- Robert Bice as Paul Jackson
- Stanley Price as Tucson Jones
- Mary MacLaren as Ma Donovan
- John Elliott as Frank Burke
- Charles King as Slim

== See also ==
The Texas Rangers series:

1. The Rangers Take Over (1942)
2. Bad Men of Thunder Gap (1943)
3. West of Texas (1943)
4. Border Buckaroos (1943)
5. Fighting Valley (1943)
6. Trail of Terror (1943)
7. The Return of the Rangers (1943)
8. Boss of Rawhide (1943)
9. Outlaw Roundup (1944)
10. Guns of the Law (1944)
11. The Pinto Bandit (1944)
12. Spook Town (1944)
13. Brand of the Devil (1944)
14. Gunsmoke Mesa (1944)
15. Gangsters of the Frontier (1944)
16. Dead or Alive (1944)
17. The Whispering Skull (1944)
18. Marked for Murder (1945)
19. Enemy of the Law (1945)
20. Three in the Saddle (1945)
21. Frontier Fugitives (1945)
22. Flaming Bullets (1945)
