= Lightning Strikes West =

1940 film

- Theatrical release poster
- Directed by: Harry L. Fraser
- Screenplay by: Martha Chapin
- Story by: Harry L. Fraser
- Produced by: Max Alexander; Arthur Alexander
- Starring: Ken Maynard; Claire Rochelle; Bob Terry; Michael Vallon; Charles King; Reed Howes
- Cinematography: Elmer Dyer
- Edited by: Charles Henkel Jr.
- Music by: Lew Porter
- Production company: Colony Pictures
- Distributed by: Colony Pictures
- Release date: June 1, 1940
- Running time: 56 minutes
- Country: United States
- Language: English

Lightning Strikes West is a 1940 American Western film directed by Harry L. Fraser and written by Martha Chapin. The film stars Ken Maynard, Claire Rochelle, Bob Terry, Michael Vallon, Charles King and Reed Howes. The film was released on June 1, 1940, by Colony Pictures.

== Cast ==
- Ken Maynard as Lightning Ken Morgan
- Claire Rochelle as Mae Grant
- Bob Terry as Tad Grant
- Michael Vallon as Butch Taggart
- Charles King as Joe Lakin
- Reed Howes as Frank
- Dick Dickinson as Mack
- George Chesebro as Sheriff
- John Elliott as Dr. Jenkins
- William Gould as Marshal Jim Correy
