= The Underdog (1943 film) =

1943 film by William Nigh

- Directed by: William Nigh
- Written by: Ben Lithman; Lawrence Taylor; Malvin Wald
- Produced by: Max Alexander
- Starring: Barton MacLane; Jan Wiley; Charlotte Wynters
- Cinematography: Robert E. Cline
- Edited by: Charles Henkel Jr.
- Music by: Lee Zahler
- Production company: Producers Releasing Corporation
- Distributed by: Producers Releasing Corporation
- Release date: October 19, 1943
- Running time: 65 minutes
- Country: United States
- Language: English

The Underdog is a 1943 American drama film directed by William Nigh and starring Barton MacLane, Jan Wiley and Charlotte Wynters.

It is a story of how a dog overcomes his fear of fire when his young master is endangered by saboteurs.

== Plot ==
After losing his farm, a man moves to a small town in World War II. His elder son is away serving in the army, while his younger boy struggles to fit in and clashes with a neighbourhood gang.

== Cast ==
- Barton MacLane as John Tate
- Bobby Larson as Henry Tate
- Jan Wiley as Ämy Tate
- Charlotte Wynters as Mrs. Bailey
- Conrad Binyon a Spike
- Elizabeth Valentine as Mrs. Connors
- Kenneth Harlan as Eddie Mohr
- George Anderson as Kraeger
- Jack Kennedy as Officer O'Toole
- Frank Ellis as Old Timer
- I. Stanford Jolley as Friendly Soldier
- Jack Rockwell as Fireman

== Production and release ==
Production started in late July 1943. The film was released on October 10, 1943.

== Distribution ==
Because of the presence of scenes showing sabotage, the War Department rejected this film from export.

== Bibliography ==
- Parish, James Robert & Pitts, Michael R. Film directors: a guide to their American films. Scarecrow Press, 1974.
