= Guy Wilkerson =

American actor (1899–1971)

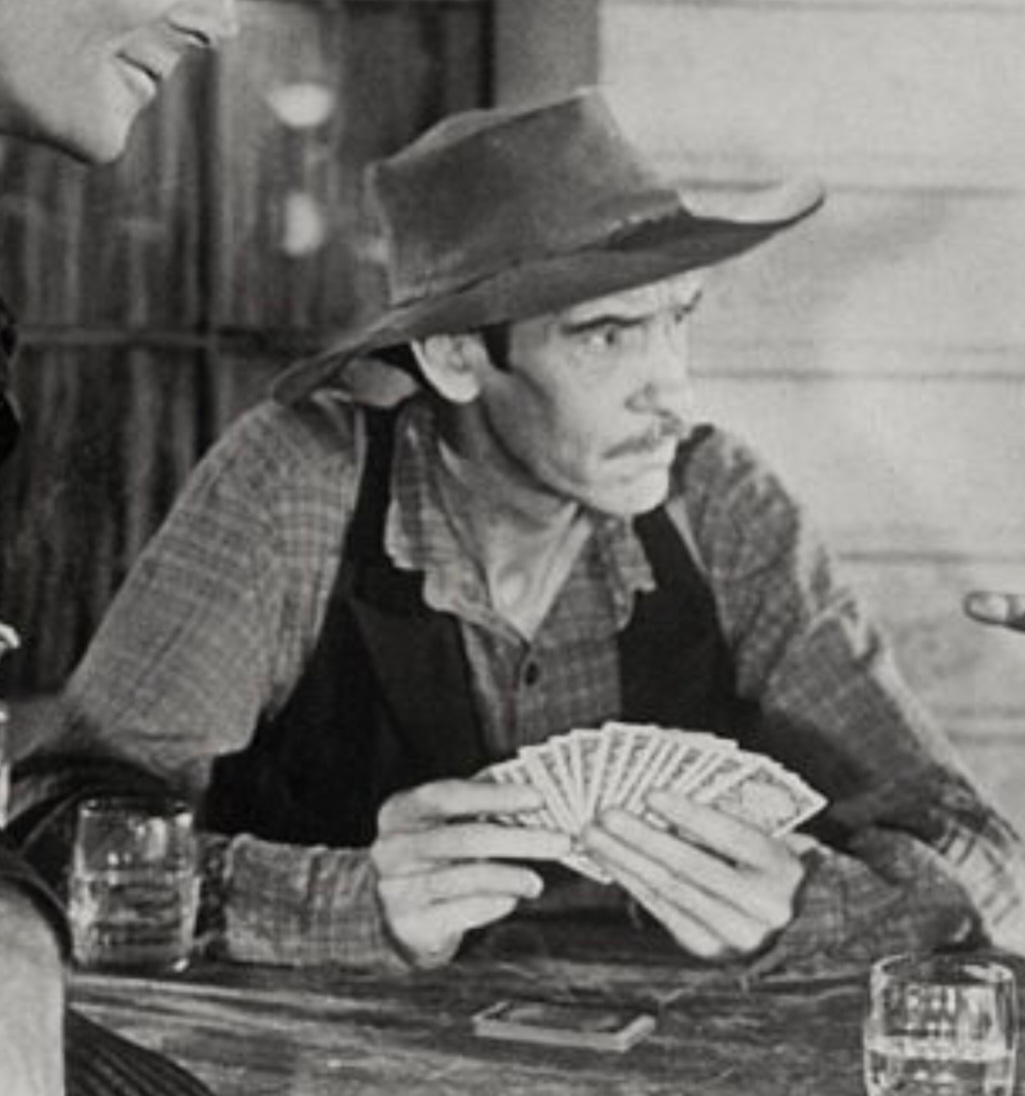
- Wilkerson in Abilene Town (1946)
- Born: Guy Owen Wilkerson; December 21, 1899; Whitewright, Texas, U.S.
- Died: July 15, 1971 (aged 71); Hollywood, California, U.S.
- Occupation: Actor
- Years active: 1937–1971

Guy Owen Wilkerson (December 21, 1899 – July 15, 1971) was an American actor, known primarily for his roles in Western B movies. With his tall, lanky frame, he often played sidekick or comedy relief parts.

== Biography ==
Wilkerson was born December 21, 1899, in Whitewright, Texas. He got his start as a dancer in 1914. In 1936, after 18 months trying to break into Hollywood films, he won his first part when he let his beard grow.

He was one-third of the Texas Rangers in the Rangers series of films, alongside Dave O'Brien in all 22 of the film's series from 1942 to 1945. James Newill was his other co-star in the first 14 of the series. Tex Ritter replaced Jim for the concluding eight entries in the series.

Wilkerson played Panhandle Perkins in all 22 films. He appeared in his 200th Western film, Decision at Sundown, in 1957.

He later made the move to television, appearing in shows such as The Lone Ranger, The Twilight Zone, Thriller, Maverick, Gunsmoke, The Fugitive, Kentucky Jones, Green Acres, and Adam-12. Wilkerson died July 15, 1971, in Hollywood, California.

== Selected filmography ==
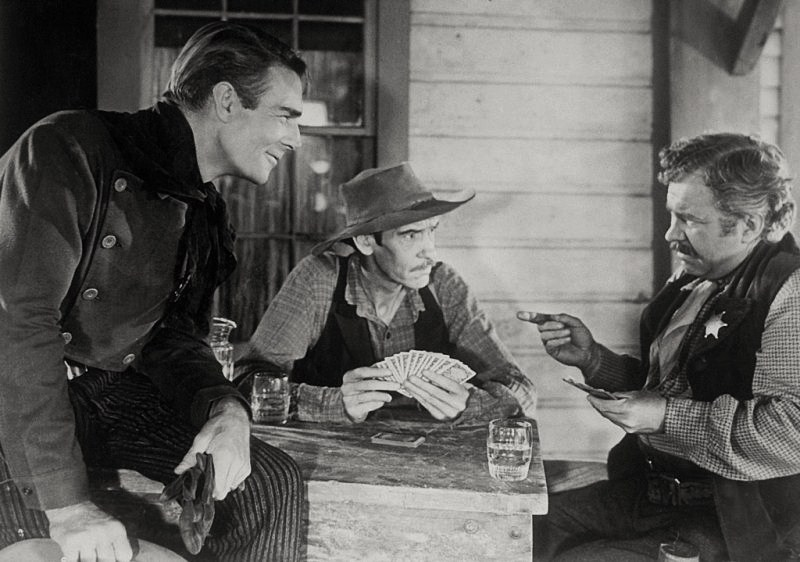
Scene from 1946 Western Abilene Town with actors (from left) Randolph Scott, Wilkerson, and Edgar Buchanan

- Paradise Express (1937) - Skinny Smith
- Mountain Justice (1937) - Asaph Anderson
- Yodelin' Kid from Pine Ridge (1937) - Turpentiner Zeke
- Mountain Music (1937) - Medicine Show Spectator (uncredited)
- Heart of the Rockies (1937) - Dawson Clan Member
- Wife, Doctor and Nurse (1937) - Assistant Delivery Man (uncredited)
- Gold Is Where You Find It (1938) - Vocal Farmer (uncredited)
- Kentucky Moonshine (1938) - Townsman (uncredited)
- Professor Beware (1938) - Shoeshine Customer (uncredited)
- Down in 'Arkansaw' (1938) - Townsman (uncredited)
- The Cowboy and the Lady (1938) - Rodeo Cowboy (uncredited)
- Dodge City (1939) - Man Wanting Revenge by Hanging (uncredited)
- Forged Passport (1939) - Jim - Servant-Henchman (uncredited)
- Man of Conquest (1939) - Texican (uncredited)
- Our Neighbors – The Carters (1939) - Father (uncredited)
- Gone with the Wind (1939) - Wounded Card Player (uncredited)
- Untamed (1940) - Sim Jarvis (uncredited)
- Sergeant York (1941) - Tom (uncredited)
- Spooks Run Wild (1941) - Constable
- Birth of the Blues (1941) - Man Outside of Jail (uncredited)
- Swamp Woman (1941) - Abner Enderberry
- Captain Midnight (1942, Serial) - Ichabod 'Icky' Mudd
- Juke Girl (1942) - Bean Picker (uncredited)
- Beyond the Blue Horizon (1942) - Husband at Circus (uncredited)
- The Pride of the Yankees (1942) - Sportsman at Ballgame (uncredited)
- Vengeance of the West (1942) - Long John
- The Rangers Take Over (1942) - Texas Ranger Panhandle Perkins
- Bad Men of Thunder Gap (1943) - Panhandle Perkins
- Hangmen Also Die! (1943) - Santrock (uncredited)
- Henry Aldrich Gets Glamour (1943) - Mac - Western Union Messenger (uncredited)
- West of Texas (1943) - Panhandle Perkins
- Border Buckaroos (1943) - Panhandle Perkins
- Fighting Valley (1943) - Panhandle Perkins
- Trail of Terror (1943) - Panhandle Perkins
- The Unknown Guest (1943) - Man in Sheriff's Party (uncredited)
- The Return of the Rangers (1943) - Panhandle Perkins
- Boss of Rawhide (1943) - Panhandle Perkins
- Outlaw Roundup (1944) - Panhandle Perkins
- Guns of the Law (1944) - Panhandle Perkins
- The Pinto Bandit (1944) - Panhandle Perkins
- Spook Town (1944) - Panhandle Perkins
- Brand of the Devil (1944) - Panhandle Perkins
- Gunsmoke Mesa (1944) - Panhandle Perkins
- Gangsters of the Frontier (1944) - Panhandle Perkins
- Dead or Alive (1944) - Panhandle Perkins
- The Whispering Skull (1944) - Panhandle Perkins
- Marked for Murder (1945) - Texas Ranger Panhandle Perkins
- Enemy of the Law (1945) - Panhandle Perkins
- Three in the Saddle (1945) - Panhandle Perkins
- Frontier Fugitives (1945) - Panhandle Perkins
- Flaming Bullets (1945) - Panhandle Perkins
- The Royal Mounted Rides Again (1945, Serial) - Citizen Visiting Nelson (uncredited)
- Captain Tugboat Annie (1945) - Jenkins
- Abilene Town (1946) - Fan-Tan Player with 'Bravo' Trimble (uncredited)
- The Scarlet Horseman (1946, Serial) - Henchman Panhandle
- The Spider Woman Strikes Back (1946) - Lem - Rancher (uncredited)
- Duel in the Sun (1946) - Dance-Floor Cowboy (uncredited)
- California (1947) - Stranger (uncredited)
- The Michigan Kid (1947) - Shotgun Messenger (uncredited)
- The Sea of Grass (1947) - Brewton Ranch Hand (uncredited)
- Danger Street (1947) - Jake - Caretaker (uncredited)
- Unconquered (1947) - Frontiersman (uncredited)
- That Hagen Girl (1947) - Link - Janitor (uncredited)
- Big Town After Dark (1947) - Newspaper Building Custodian (uncredited)
- The Man from Texas (1948) - Townsman (uncredited)
- Fury at Furnace Creek (1948) - Court Clerk (uncredited)
- Speed to Spare (1948) - Pop, Trucker's Cafe Owner (uncredited)
- Texas, Brooklyn & Heaven (1948) - Thibault (uncredited)
- Red River (1948) - Pete (uncredited)
- The Plunderers (1948) - Loafer Townsman (uncredited)
- The Decision of Christopher Blake (1948) - Stage Doorman (uncredited)
- The Sun Comes Up (1949) - Farmer Volunteering to Take in Six Orphans (uncredited)
- The Walking Hills (1949) - Cowhand (uncredited)
- Red Stallion in the Rockies (1949) - Rancher (uncredited)
- The Girl from Jones Beach (1949) - Relaxing Janitor (uncredited)
- Roseanna McCoy (1949) - A Hatfield (uncredited)
- Woman in Hiding (1950) - Searcher in Rowboat (uncredited)
- Comanche Territory (1950) - Barfly Talking to Katie (uncredited)
- A Ticket to Tomahawk (1950) - Dr. Brink (uncredited)
- Please Believe Me (1950) - Rural Mailman (uncredited)
- Return of the Frontiersman (1950) - Prisoner (uncredited)
- Winchester '73 (1950) - Virgil Earp (uncredited)
- Wyoming Mail (1950) - Townsman (uncredited)
- Mr. Music (1950) - Actor in Show (uncredited)
- Stage to Tucson (1950) - Tom - Stage Driver (uncredited)
- The Great Missouri Raid (1951) - Clell Miller
- Santa Fe (1951) - Depot Clerk (uncredited)
- The Fat Man (1951) - Justice of the Peace (uncredited)
- Along the Great Divide (1951) - Jury Foreman (uncredited)
- Passage West (1951) - Frontiersman in Wagon (uncredited)
- Comin' Round the Mountain (1951) - Uncle Clem McCoy
- Mr. Belvedere Rings the Bell (1951) - Kramer (uncredited)
- The Red Badge of Courage (1951) - Veteran (uncredited)
- Drums in the Deep South (1951) - Confederate Sentry (uncredited)
- Scandal Sheet (1952) - Janitor (uncredited)
- Carbine Williams (1952) - Prisoner (uncredited)
- The San Francisco Story (1952) - Man in Jail (uncredited)
- The Story of Will Rogers (1952) - Townsman (uncredited)
- The Big Sky (1952) - Henchman Longface (uncredited)
- The Legend of the Lone Ranger (1952) - Deputy Corey (uncredited)
- All I Desire (1953) - Clem (uncredited)
- The Last Posse (1953) - George Romer
- The Man from the Alamo (1953) - Rifleman (uncredited)
- The Mississippi Gambler (1953) - Ike - Station Agent (uncredited)
- Take the High Ground! (1953) - Carey's Father (uncredited)
- Those Redheads from Seattle (1953) - Wandering Willie (uncredited)
- Crime Wave (1953) - Beer-Drinker at Counter (uncredited)
- The Boy from Oklahoma (1954) - Huey Mitchell (uncredited)
- Ma and Pa Kettle at Home (1954) - Jones (uncredited)
- The Far Country (1954) - Tanana Pete (uncredited)
- Wyoming Renegades (1955) - Stagecoach Driver (uncredited)
- Foxfire (1955) - Mr. Barton (uncredited)
- One Desire (1955) - Marshal Coe (uncredited)
- Lucy Gallant (1955) - Painter (uncredited)
- I'll Cry Tomorrow (1955) - Barfly (uncredited)
- Ransom! (1956) - Farmer at Roadside (uncredited)
- Meet Me in Las Vegas (1956) - Slim (uncredited)
- Jubal (1956) - Cookie (uncredited)
- You Can't Run Away from It (1956) - Herdsman (scenes deleted)
- Shoot-Out at Medicine Bend (1957) - Loafer (uncredited)
- The Buster Keaton Story (1957) - Boarder
- Band of Angels (1957) - Minister (uncredited)
- 3:10 to Yuma (1957) - Hotel Proprietor-Bartender (uncredited)
- Decision at Sundown (1957) - Abe (uncredited)
- Cowboy (1958) - Peggy - Trail Hand-Cook (uncredited)
- Wild Heritage (1958) - Chaco - Trail Drive Cook
- Man of the West (1958) - Train Conductor (uncredited)
- The Hanging Tree (1959) - Townsman Who Sells Cabib (uncredited)
- No Name on the Bullet (1959) - Farmer (uncredited)
- The FBI Story (1959) - Cliff Eberhardt (uncredited)
- Toby Tyler (1960) - Townsman (uncredited)
- Elmer Gantry (1960) - Janitor in Revival Tent (uncredited)
- Seven Ways from Sundown (1960) - Townsman of Beeker's Crossing (uncredited)
- The Walking Target (1960) - Lank (uncredited)
- Susan Slade (1961) - Slim
- Moon Pilot (1962) - Conventioneer in Elevator (uncredited)
- To Kill a Mockingbird (1962) - Jury Foreman (uncredited)
- Spencer's Mountain (1963) - Slim Temple (uncredited)
- The Haunted Palace (1963) - Gideon Leach / Mr. Leach
- The Brass Bottle (1964) - Client (uncredited)
- Your Cheatin' Heart (1964) - The Minister (uncredited)
- War Party (1965) - Wooden Face
- Black Spurs (1965) - Henry
- Harlow (1965) - Comic Hunter (uncredited)
- Never Too Late (1965) - Plant Foreman (uncredited)
- The Silencers (1966) - Farmer (uncredited)
- Alvarez Kelly (1966) - Jailer (uncredited)
- Good Times (1967) - Deputy (uncredited)
- True Grit (1969) - The Hangman (uncredited)
- The Great Bank Robbery (1969) - Glazier (uncredited)
- Hello, Dolly! (1969) - Laborer (uncredited)
- There Was a Crooked Man... (1970) - Prisoner In Solitary (uncredited)
- Monte Walsh (1970) - Old Man (uncredited)
- The Todd Killings (1971) - Mr. Carpenter (final film role)

== Selected television ==
Year	Title	Role	Notes
1952	Death Valley Days	Enoch Fish	Season 1 Episode 1 "How Death Valley Got Its Name"
1953	Death Valley Days	Tex	Season 1 Episode 14 "Claim Jumpin' Jennie"
1959	Gunsmoke	Bartender Pete Wilkins	Season 4 Episode 26 “The Bear"
1959	Wanted Dead or Alive	Sowbelly Logan	Season 2 Episode 9 "The Tyrant"
1960	Wanted Dead or Alive	Prospector	Season 3 Episode 9 "Criss-Cross"
1960	Twilight Zone	Counterman	Season 2 Episode 7 "Nick of Time"
