= Phantom Rancher =

1940 film

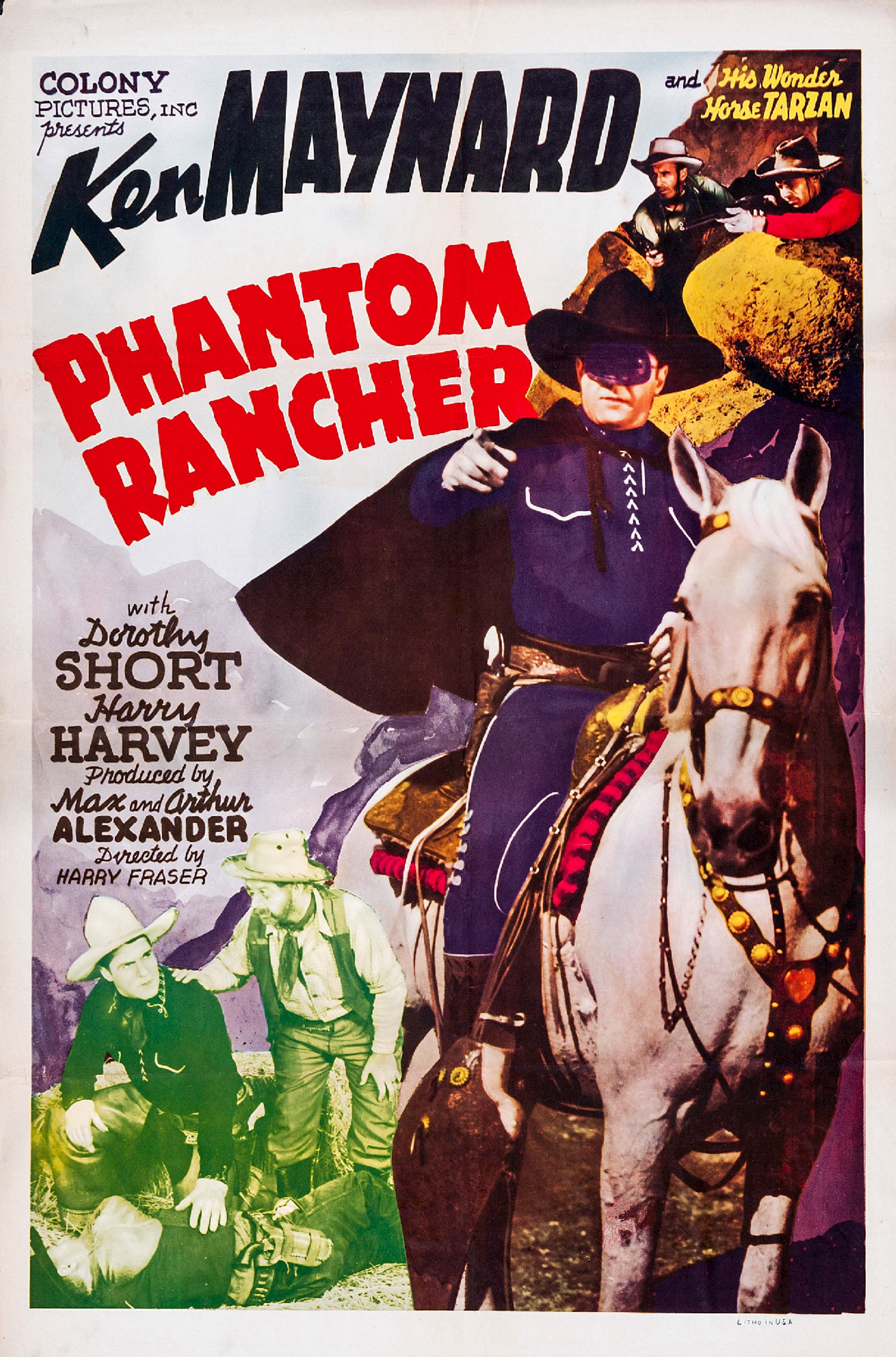
- Theatrical release poster
- Directed by: Harry L. Fraser
- Written by: William Lively (story); William Lively (screenplay)
- Produced by: Arthur Alexander (producer); Max Alexander (producer)
- Starring: See below
- Cinematography: William Hyer
- Edited by: Frederick Bain
- Production company: Colony Pictures
- Release date: 1940
- Running time: 61 minutes
- Country: United States
- Language: English

Phantom Rancher is a 1940 American Western film directed by Harry L. Fraser and starring Ken Maynard.

== Plot summary ==
When Ken Mitchell inherits his late uncle's cattle ranch he finds the community hates him for trying to drive farmers off their land. He discovers that a respected member of the community named Collins is really behind the activity and may have had his uncle killed. The only way Ken can gain the community's trust and bring Collins and his gang to justice is appearing as a masked "Phantom Rancher" to dispense justice.

== Cast ==
- Ken Maynard as Ken Mitchell
- Dorothy Short as Ann Markham
- Harry Harvey as Gopher
- Ted Adams as Collins
- Dave O'Brien as Henchman Luke
- Tom London as Sheriff Parker
- John Elliott as Dad Markham
- Reed Howes as Lon, Burton Foreman
- Steve Clark as Burton
- Carl Mathews as Henchman Hank
- James Sheridan as Henchman Joe
