= Flaming Lead =

- Theatrical release poster
- Directed by: Sam Newfield
- Screenplay by: Joseph O'Donnell
- Produced by: Max Alexander; Arthur Alexander
- Starring: Ken Maynard; Eleanor Stewart; Dave O'Brien; Walter Long; Tom London; Reed Howes
- Cinematography: Arthur Reed
- Edited by: Holbrook N. Todd
- Production company: Colony Pictures
- Distributed by: Colony Pictures
- Release date: November 1, 1939
- Running time: 57 minutes
- Country: United States
- Language: English

Flaming Lead is a 1939 American Western film directed by Sam Newfield and written by Joseph O'Donnell. The film stars Ken Maynard, Eleanor Stewart, Dave O'Brien, Walter Long, Tom London and Reed Howes. The film was released on November 1, 1939, by Colony Pictures.

== Cast ==
- Ken Maynard as Ken Clark
- Eleanor Stewart as Kay Burke
- Dave O'Brien as Frank Gordon
- Walter Long as Jim Creely
- Tom London as Bart Daggett
- Reed Howes as Tex Hanlon
- Ralph Peters as Panhandle
- Carleton Young as Hank
- Kenne Duncan as Larry
- Bob Terry as Blackie
- Joyce Rogers as Gertie
