= West of Nevada =

1936 film by Robert F. Hill

- Directed by: Robert F. Hill
- Written by: Charles Kyson (novel); Robert F. Hill
- Produced by: Arthur Alexander; Max Alexander
- Starring: Rex Bell; Joan Barclay; Al St. John
- Cinematography: Robert E. Cline
- Edited by: Dan Milner; Charles Henkel Jr.
- Production company: Colony Pictures
- Distributed by: Colony Pictures
- Release date: July 21, 1936
- Running time: 57 minutes
- Country: United States
- Language: English

West of Nevada is a 1936 American Western film directed by Robert F. Hill and starring Rex Bell, Joan Barclay and Al St. John.

== Cast ==
- Rex Bell as Jim Carden, posing as Jim Lloyd
- Joan Barclay as Helen Haldain
- Al St. John as Walla Walla Wiggins
- Steve Clark as Milt Haldain
- Georgia O'Dell as Rose Gilbury
- Dick Botiller as Bald Eagle
- Frank McCarroll as Henchman Slade Sangree
- Forrest Taylor as Steven Cutting

== Bibliography ==
- Magers, Boyd; Fitzgerald, Michael G. (2004). Westerns Women: Interviews with 50 Leading Ladies of Movie and Television Westerns from the 1930s to the 1960s. McFarland.
