= Lure of the Wasteland =

- Theatrical release poster
- Directed by: Harry L. Fraser
- Screenplay by: Robert Emmett Tansey
- Story by: Harry L. Fraser
- Produced by: Robert Emmett Tansey
- Starring: Grant Withers; LeRoy Mason; Ruth Findlay; Snub Pollard; Tom London; Henry Roquemore; Karl Hackett
- Cinematography: Francis Corby
- Edited by: Charles Henkel Jr.
- Music by: Frank Sanucci
- Production company: Al Lane Pictures
- Distributed by: Monogram Pictures
- Release date: March 18, 1939
- Running time: 55 minutes
- Country: United States
- Language: English

Lure of the Wasteland is a 1939 American Western film directed by Harry L. Fraser and written by Robert Emmett Tansey. The film stars Grant Withers, LeRoy Mason, Ruth Findlay, Snub Pollard, Tom London, Henry Roquemore and Karl Hackett. The film was released on March 18, 1939, by Monogram Pictures.

== Cast ==
- Grant Withers as Smitty
- LeRoy Mason as Butch Cooper
- Ruth Findlay as Ruth Carlton
- Snub Pollard as Cookie
- Tom London as Carlton Foreman
- Henry Roquemore as Judge Carlton
- Karl Hackett as Parker
- Bob Terry as Red
- James Sheridan as Spike
- Nolan Willis as Jim
