= The Silver Bandit =

1950 film by Elmer Clifton

- Directed by: Elmer Clifton
- Written by: Elmer Clifton
- Produced by: Raymond Friedgen
- Starring: Spade Cooley; Bob Gilbert; Ginny Jackson
- Cinematography: Harvey Hines
- Edited by: Robert Adams
- Music by: John F. Haynes
- Production company: Spade Cooley Productions
- Distributed by: Astor Pictures
- Release date: February 20, 1950
- Running time: 51 minutes
- Country: United States
- Language: English

The Silver Bandit is a 1950 American musical Western film directed by Elmer Clifton and starring Spade Cooley, Bob Gilbert and Ginny Jackson. It was originally shot in 1947 on a budget of $30,000, but wasn't picked up for distribution for three years. It was the final film of the veteran director Elmer Clifton.

== Cast ==
- Spade Cooley as Spade Cooley
- Bob Gilbert as Sam Morrell
- Ginny Jackson as Molly Doren
- Dick Elliott as Van Fleet Stooglehammer
- Billy Dix as Sheriff Martin Lane
- Gene Gray as Gene Gray
- Clyde Jackman as Frank Doren
- Hugh Hooker as Deputy Hugh

== Bibliography ==
- Pitts, Michael R. Astor Pictures: A Filmography and History of the Reissue King, 1933-1965 McFarland, 2019.
