= Idaho Kid =

1936 film

- Directed by: Robert F. Hill
- Written by: {{ub[Paul Evan Lehman|George H. Plympton}}
- Produced by: Arthur Alexander; Max Alexander
- Starring: Rex Bell; Marion Shilling; David Sharpe
- Cinematography: Robert E. Cline
- Edited by: Charles Henkel Jr.
- Music by: Lee Zahler
- Production company: Colony Pictures
- Distributed by: Colony Pictures
- Release date: August 6, 1936
- Running time: 59 minutes
- Country: United States
- Language: English

Idaho Kid is a 1936 American Western film directed by Robert F. Hill and starring Rex Bell, Marion Shilling, and David Sharpe.

== Plot ==
Following the death of his mother in childbirth, Todd Hollister's father has nothing to do with him. He is raised by Hollister's arch rival on the range, John Endicott. Keeping his identity a secret, Todd and his young sidekick get a job with the Hollister ranch with the idea to stop the feud. Others wish the feud to continue for their own profit.

== Cast ==
- Rex Bell as Todd Hollister aka Idaho
- Marion Shilling as Ruth Endicott
- David Sharpe as The Kid
- Earl Dwire as Clint Hollister
- Lafe McKee as John Endicott
- Charles King as Bibb Slagel
- Phil Dunham as Tumblebug Jones
- Lane Chandler as Jess Peters
- Dorothy Wood as Mrs. Endicott

== Bibliography ==
- Pitts, Michael R. Poverty Row Studios, 1929-1940. McFarland & Company, 2005.
