= Law and Lead =

1936 film

- Theatrical release poster
- Directed by: Robert F. Hill
- Written by: Robert F. Hill (story); Basil Dickey (screenplay)
- Produced by: Arthur Alexander (producer); Max Alexander (associate producer)
- Starring: See below
- Cinematography: Robert E. Cline
- Edited by: Charles Henkel Jr.
- Release date: 1936
- Running time: 57 minutes
- Country: United States
- Language: English

Law and Lead is a 1936 American Western film directed by Robert F. Hill that is a remake of Cowboy Holiday (1934).

== Plot ==
Range Detective Jimmy Sawyer has earned time off after apprehending four offenders. He overhears one his fellow detectives being assigned to apprehend Pancho Gonzales, a bandit known as the Juarez Kid. As Sawyer previously arrested Gonzalez and believed him when he said he would never break the law again, Sawyer takes the assignment to discover if Gonzalez is really the Juarez Kid, or someone is masquerading as the bandit.

== Cast ==
- Rex Bell as Jimmy Sawyer
- Donald Reed as Pancho Gonzales, aka The Juarez Kid
- Hal Taliaferro as Steve Bradley
- Harley Wood (Harlene Wood) as Hope Hawley
- Earl Dwire as Dad Hawley
- Soledad Jiménez as Señora Gonzales
- Roger Williams as Card cheat
- Lane Chandler as Cattleman Detective Ned
