= Two Minutes to Play =

1936 film by Robert F. Hill

- Film poster
- Directed by: Robert F. Hill
- Written by: William Buchanan
- Produced by: Sam Katzman
- Starring: Herman Brix
- Cinematography: Bill Hyer
- Edited by: Charles Henkel Jr.
- Distributed by: Victory Pictures
- Release date: 1936
- Running time: 74 minutes
- Country: United States
- Language: English

Two Minutes to Play is a 1936 American sports comedy film directed by Robert F. Hill.

== Plot ==
Martin Granville, the son of a disgraced college football player, enrolls in his father's college and joins the football team after being charmed into it by the flirtatious Pat Meredith. He begins dating Meredith who, in turn, is dating several other young men. When the inebriated team captain Jack Gaines gets into a fight, Granville takes the blame. Granville is suspended until Gaines confesses, and Gaines wins the game for the college. Meredith marries a millionaire.

== Cast ==
- Herman Brix – Martin Granville
- Jeanne Martel – Pat Meredith
- Forrest Taylor – Coach Rodney
- Edward Nugent – Jack Gaines
- Duncan Renaldo – Lew Ashley
