= Stormy Trails =

1936 film

- Theatrical release poster
- Directed by: Sam Newfield
- Screenplay by: Phil Dunham
- Based on: Stampede by E.B. Mann
- Produced by: Arthur Alexander; Max Alexander
- Starring: Rex Bell; Bob Terry; Lois Wilde; Lane Chandler; Earl Dwire; Lloyd Ingraham
- Cinematography: Robert E. Cline
- Edited by: Charles Henkel Jr.
- Production company: Colony Pictures
- Distributed by: Colony Pictures
- Release date: December 23, 1936
- Running time: 58 minutes
- Country: United States
- Language: English

Stormy Trails is a 1936 American Western film directed by Sam Newfield and written by Phil Dunham. It is based on the 1934 novel Stampede by E.B. Mann. The film stars Rex Bell, Bob Terry, Lois Wilde, Lane Chandler, Earl Dwire and Lloyd Ingraham. The film was released on December 23, 1936, by Colony Pictures.

== Cast ==
- Rex Bell as Tom Storm
- Bob Terry as Billy Storm
- Lois Wilde as Connie Curlew
- Lane Chandler as Dunn
- Earl Dwire as Steve Varick
- Lloyd Ingraham as Curlew
- Karl Hackett as Max Durante
- Earle Ross as T.J. Thurman
- Murdock MacQuarrie as Sheriff
- Jimmy Aubrey as Shives
- Roger Williams as Mike Daniels
