= Big Boy Rides Again =

1935 film

- Film poster
- Directed by: Albert Herman
- Written by: William L. Nolte
- Produced by: Arthur Alexander (producer); Peter E. Kassler (associate producer); Max Alexander (producer) (uncredited)
- Cinematography: Harry Forbes
- Edited by: Ralph Holt
- Production companies: M & A Alexander Productions
- Distributed by: Beacon Productions
- Release date: January 5, 1935
- Running time: 57 minutes
- Country: United States
- Language: English

Big Boy Rides Again is a 1935 American Western film directed by Albert Herman.

== Cast ==
- Guinn "Big Boy" Williams as Tom Duncan
- Constance Bergen as Nancy Smiley
- Charles K. French as John Duncan
- Lafe McKee as Tap Smiley
- Victor Potel as Ranch Foreman Scarface
- William Gould as Lawyer Burt Hartecker
- Bud Osborne as Windy
- Frank Ellis as Henchman Al
- Louis Vincenot as Ranch Cook Sing Fat
