= Charles Henkel Jr. =

American film editor

- Born: October 22, 1895; New York City, United States
- Died: January 18, 1959 (aged 63); United States
- Other name: Charles Henkel
- Occupation: Editor
- Years active: 1921–1947 (film)

Charles Henkel Jr. (1895–1959) was an American film editor. He was prolifically active during the 1930s and early 1940s, editing around seventy films at a variety of lower-budget studios including Grand National, Monogram Pictures and Producers Releasing Corporation.

== Selected filmography ==
- The Lone Bandit (1935)
- The Outlaw Tamer (1935)
- Too Much Beef (1936)
- Men of the Plains (1936)
- I'll Name the Murderer (1936)
- Rip Roarin' Buckaroo (1936)
- Idaho Kid (1936)
- Law and Lead (1936)
- Two Minutes to Play (1936)
- Stormy Trails (1936)
- The Phantom of the Range (1936)
- West of Nevada (1936)
- The Reckless Way (1936)
- Special Agent K-7 (1937)
- The Shadow Strikes (1937)
- Cheyenne Rides Again (1937)
- International Crime (1938)
- Whirlwind Horseman (1938)
- Six-Shootin' Sheriff (1938)
- In Old Montana (1939)
- Lure of the Wasteland (1939)
- Code of the Fearless (1939)
- Two Gun Troubador (1939)
- Ridin' the Trail (1940)
- Lightning Strikes West (1940)
- City of Missing Girls (1941)
- Swamp Woman (1941)
- I'll Sell My Life (1941)
- Hard Guy (1941)
- Lady from Chungking (1942)
- Bombs Over Burma (1942)
- The Rangers Take Over (1942)
- The Payoff (1942)
- Today I Hang (1942)
- The Boss of Big Town (1942)
- They Raid by Night (1942)
- Secrets of a Co-Ed (1942)
- Girls in Chains (1943)
- The Return of the Rangers (1943)
- The Underdog (1943)
- Trail of Terror (1943)
- West of Texas (1943)
- Fighting Valley (1943)
- Isle of Forgotten Sins (1943)
- Boss of Rawhide (1943)
- The Ghost and the Guest (1943)
- Corregidor (1943)
- Border Buckaroos (1943)
- Bad Men of Thunder Gap (1943)
- Spook Town (1944)
- Brand of the Devil (1944)
- Outlaw Roundup (1944)
- Gangsters of the Frontier (1944)
- Men on Her Mind (1944)
- The Pinto Bandit (1944)
- Gunsmoke Mesa (1944)
- Guns of the Law (1944)
- I Accuse My Parents (1944)
- Waterfront (1944)
- Seven Doors to Death (1944)
- Brenda Starr, Reporter (1945)
- Wildfire (1945)

== Bibliography ==
- Pitts, Michael R. Poverty Row Studios, 1929-1940. McFarland & Company, 2005.
