= Queen of the Yukon =

1940 film by Phil Rosen

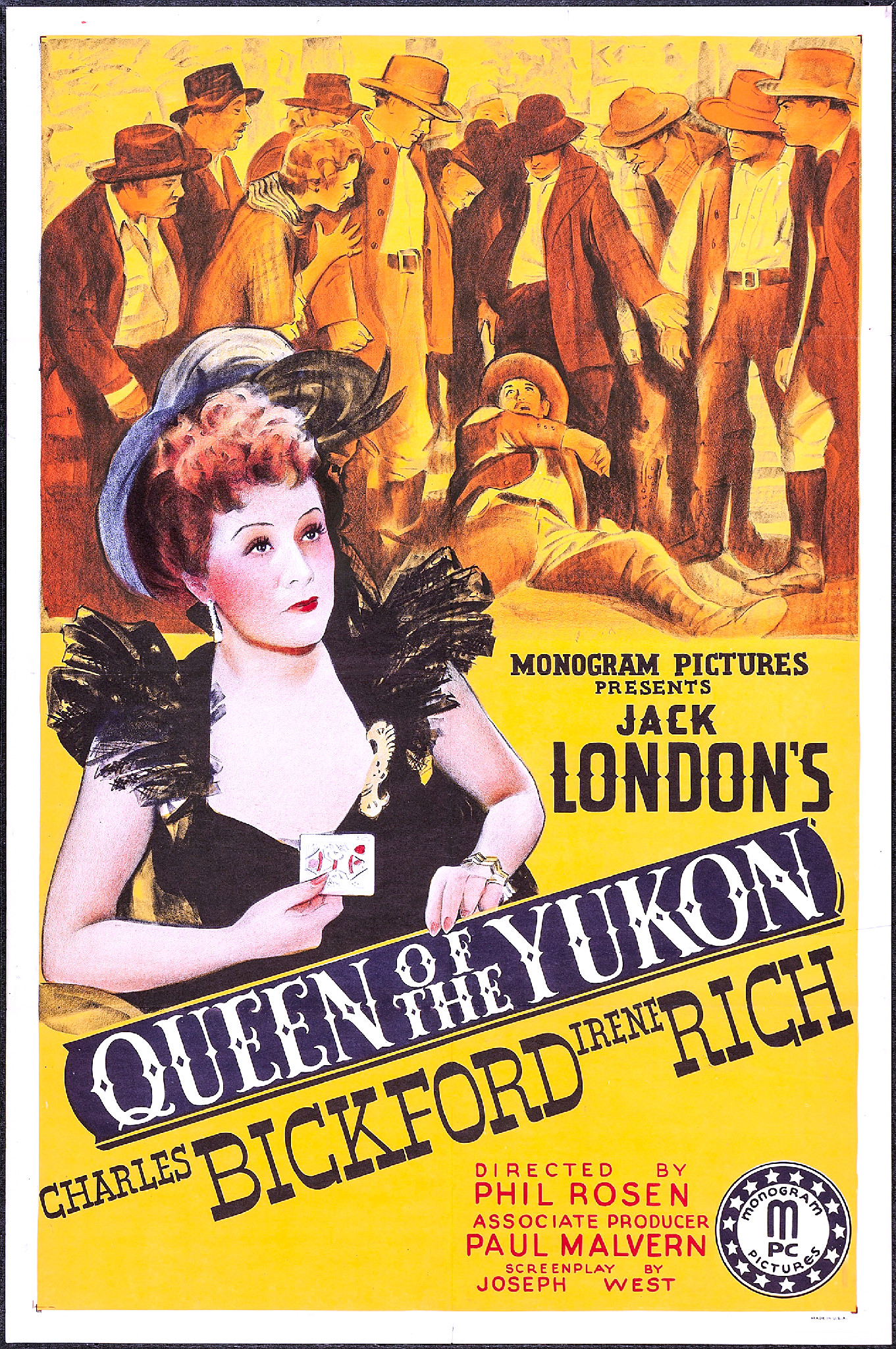
- Theatrical release poster
- Directed by: Phil Rosen
- Written by: Jack London (story); George Waggner
- Starring: Charles Bickford; Irene Rich; June Carlson; Dave O'Brien
- Cinematography: Harry Neumann
- Edited by: Russell F. Schoengarth
- Distributed by: Monogram Pictures
- Release date: August 26, 1940
- Running time: 74 minutes
- Country: United States
- Language: English

Queen Of The Yukon is a 1940 American Western film. The film is an adaptation of Jack London's story. Filming took place in Big Bear Lake, California.

== Plot ==
Sadie Martin (Irene Rich) owns a riverboat that is frequently used by miners traveling to their claims. During their trip, the miners drink and gamble. Sadie's daughter, Helen (June Carlson), is unaware of her mother's work because her mother sends her to boarding school in order to live a lifestyle more attributed to the upper-class. Unfortunately for Sadie, she is facing difficulty maintaining the costly riverboat. She is soon forced to sell the boat in order to make ends meet. However, greater problems soon enter Sadie's life as the Yukon Mining Company sends John Thorne (Melvin Lang) to take the riverboat away from her, as well as to cheat all of her customers out of their claims. Meanwhile, Helen unexpectedly arrives on the riverboat with her boyfriend Bob (Dave O'Brien). Bob takes a job with John and is unknowingly manipulated by him. To Sadie's disappointment, Helen appears to enjoy life on the riverboat. Sadie soon implores Ace Rincon (Charles Bickford) to help her.

== Cast ==
- Charles Bickford — Ace Rincon
- Irene Rich — Sadie Martin
- June Carlson — Helen Martin
- Dave O'Brien — Bob Adams
- George Cleveland — Grub
- Guy Usher — Stake
- Melvin Lang — John Thorne
- Tris Coffin — Carson
- Jack Daley — Captain
