= Dave O'Brien (actor) =

American film actor

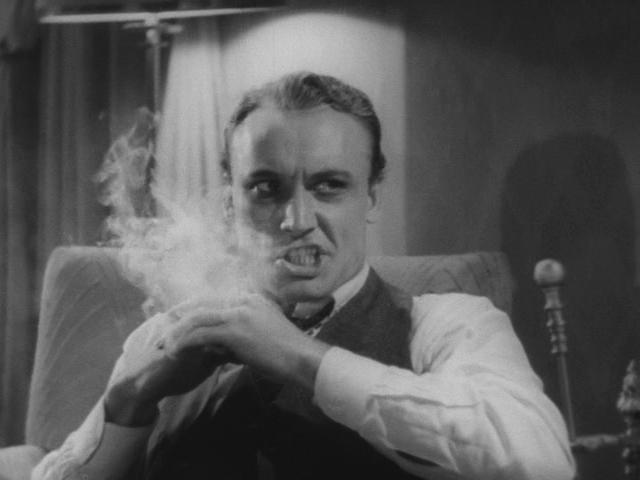
- O'Brien in Reefer Madness (1936)
- Born: David Poole Fronabarger; May 31, 1912; Big Spring, Texas, U.S.
- Died: November 8, 1969 (aged 57)
- Occupation: Actor
- Years active: 1930–1969
- Spouse(s): Dorothy Short (m. 1936; div. 1954); Nancy Lee Lister (m. 1954-1969)
- Children: 5

Dave O'Brien (born David Poole Fronabarger; May 31, 1912 – November 8, 1969) was an American film actor, stunt man, film director, and Emmy awarded comedy writer. He was well known for his portrayal, in the 1942 serial films of the title character in Captain Midnight, performer and comedy writer in the Pete Smith Specialties and as one of Red Skelton's comedy writers.

== Life and career ==
Born in Big Spring, Texas, to Mike Fronabarger and his wife, Mary Edith, he started his film career performing in choruses and working as a stunt double, then graduating into larger roles, mostly in B pictures. He adopted "O'Brien" as his acting pseudonym. He had roles in early Western movies such as Lightnin' Crandall (1937).

O'Brien acted in the Metro-Goldwyn-Mayer comedy short film series Pete Smith Specialties. O'Brien wrote and directed many of these subjects under the name David Barclay. In 1933, O'Brien also had a small dancing part with Bebe Daniels in the Busby Berkeley musical 42nd Street. O'Brien portrayed a frantic drug abuser in the 1936 anti-drug film Tell Your Children (better known under its reissue title, Reefer Madness).

He appeared in several of the East Side Kids films. He appeared in low-budget Westerns, such as Producers Releasing Corporation's Texas Rangers series, billed as "Tex O'Brien".

In 1940, he appeared in Queen of the Yukon, The Devil Bat with Bela Lugosi, and Son of the Navy. In 1942, he starred in the fifteen episode movie serial Captain Midnight. In 1944, were roles in a series of Westerns, some of which were the Billy the Kid serials, and serials The Texas Rangers, a lead role in Brand of the Devil. In 1945, he appeared in The Man Who Walked Alone. By 1953, he was in the MGM musical Kiss Me, Kate.

== Recognition and writing career, death ==
As a comedy writer for The Red Skelton Show, O'Brien shared an Emmy Award for Outstanding Writing for a Comedy Series in 1961. Then, shared a nomination for the same award in 1963. At the time of his death in 1969, O'Brien was still writing for the Red Skelton Hour.

== Selected filmography ==
- Consolation Marriage (1931)
- The World Changes (1933) as Otto Peterson (uncredited)
- Bright Eyes (1934) as Bill
- The Black Coin (1936, serial)
- Reefer Madness (1936)
- Rough Riding Rhythm (1937)
- Gun Packer (1938)
- Frontier Scout (1938) as Steven Norris
- Fighting Mad (1939) as Constable Kelly
- Flaming Lead (1939)
- Trigger Smith (1939) as Duke
- Crashing Thru (1939)
- Main Street Lawyer (1939) (uncredited)
- East Side Kids (1940) as 'Knuckles' Dolan
- Boys of the City (1940) as 'Knuckles' Dolan
- That Gang of Mine (1940) as 'Knuckles' Dolan
- Gun Code (1940) as Gale
- The Devil Bat (1940) as Johnny Layton
- Isle of Destiny (1940) Navy Radio Man (uncredited)
- Phantom Rancher (1940) as Henchman Luke
- Son of the Navy (1940) as Chief Machinist's Mate
- Hold That Woman (1940) as Miles Hanover
- Sky Bandits (1940) as Constable Kelly
- Buzzy Rides the Range (1940) as Ken Blair
- Queen of the Yukon
- Flying Wild (1941) as Tom Lawson
- Buzzy and the Phantom Pinto (1941)
- The Spider Returns (1941)
- Murder by Invitation (1941) as Michael, the Chauffeur
- Billy the Kid in Santa Fe (1941) as Texas Joe
- Billy the Kid Wanted (1941) as Jeff
- Spooks Run Wild (1941) as Jeff Dixon
- Double Trouble (1941) as Sparky Marshall
- Forbidden Trails (1941) as Jim Cramer
- Bowery at Midnight (1942) as Peter Crawford
- 'Neath Brooklyn Bridge (1942) as Sergeant Lyons
- Billy the Kid's Smoking Guns (1942) as Jeff Travis
- The Yanks Are Coming (1942) as Sgt. Callahan
- The Rangers Take Over (1942) as Tex Wyatt
- Bad Men of Thunder Gap (1943) as Tex Wyatt
- West of Texas (1943) as Tex Wyatt
- Border Buckaroos (1943) as Tex Wyatt
- Fighting Valley (1943) as Tex Wyatt
- Trail of Terror (1943) as Tex Wyatt
- The Return of the Rangers (1943) as Tex Wyatt
- Boss of Rawhide (1943) as Tex Wyatt
- Tahiti Nights (1944)
- Outlaw Roundup (1944) as Tex Wyatt
- Guns of the Law (1944) as Tex Wyatt
- The Pinto Bandit (1944) as Tex Wyatt
- Spook Town (1944) as Tex Wyatt
- Brand of the Devil (1944) as Tex Wyatt
- Gunsmoke Mesa (1944) as Tex Wyatt
- Gangsters of the Frontier (1944) as Tex Wyatt
- Dead or Alive (1944) as Tex Wyatt
- The Whispering Skull (1944) as Tex Wyatt
- Marked for Murder (1945) as Tex Wyatt
- The Phantom of 42nd Street (1945) as Tony Woolrich
- Enemy of the Law (1945) as Tex Wyatt
- Three in the Saddle (1945) as Tex Wyatt
- Frontier Fugitives (1945) as Tex Wyatt
- Flaming Bullets (1945) as Tex Wyatt
- The Man Who Walked Alone (1945)
- Kiss Me, Kate (1953)
- T.V. of Tomorrow (1953) Himself (in the TV screen)
- The Kettles in the Ozarks (1956) Conductor

== Selected short subjects ==
Year	Title	Role	Notes
1942	Calling All Pa's	Joe Thunderstruck	
1943	First Aid	Crandall K. Krumb, the Husband	
1943	Seventh Column	Falstaff Pratt	Uncredited
1944	Movie Pests	Feet-in-the-Aisle-Pest	Uncredited
1944	Safety Sleuth	Careless Man	Uncredited
1946	Treasures From Trash	Alonzo T. Mousebrain	Director and Screenplay Writer as David Barclay
1946	Sure Cures	Xavier T. Schneckendorf	Director and Screenplay Writer as David Barclay
1946	I Love My Husband, BUT!	The Husband	Director as David Barclay, Dorothy Short appears as his Wife
1947	I Love My Wife, BUT!	The Husband	Director as David Barclay, Dorothy Short appears as his Wife
1947	Have You Ever Wondered	Main Character	Director and Screenplay Writer as David Barclay
1948	I Love My Mother-in-Law, But...	The Husband	Director as David Barclay, Dorothy Short as his Wife, and Anne O'Neal as the Mother-in-Law
1948	Ice Aces		Director as David Barclay
1948	You Can't Win	Harried Homeowner	Director and Screenplay Writer as David Barclay
1948	Let's Cogitate		Director and Screenplay Writer as David Barclay
1949	Just Suppose	The Dad	Director as David Barclay
1950	Did'ja Know?	Main Character	Director as David Barclay
1950	Wrong Way Butch	Wrong Way Butch	Director as David Barclay
1952	I Love Children But...	The Dad/Papa Schlemiel	Director and Writer as David Barclay
1953	Things We Can Do Without	Thaddeus E. Thud	Director and Writer as David Barclay
1954	Ain't it Aggravatin'	Main Character	Director and Writer as David Barclay
1954	Do Someone a Favor	George Dibson	Director and Writer as David Barclay
1954	Out for Fun	Businessman seeking relaxation	Director and Writer as David Barclay
