= Harry Fraser (director) =

American film director

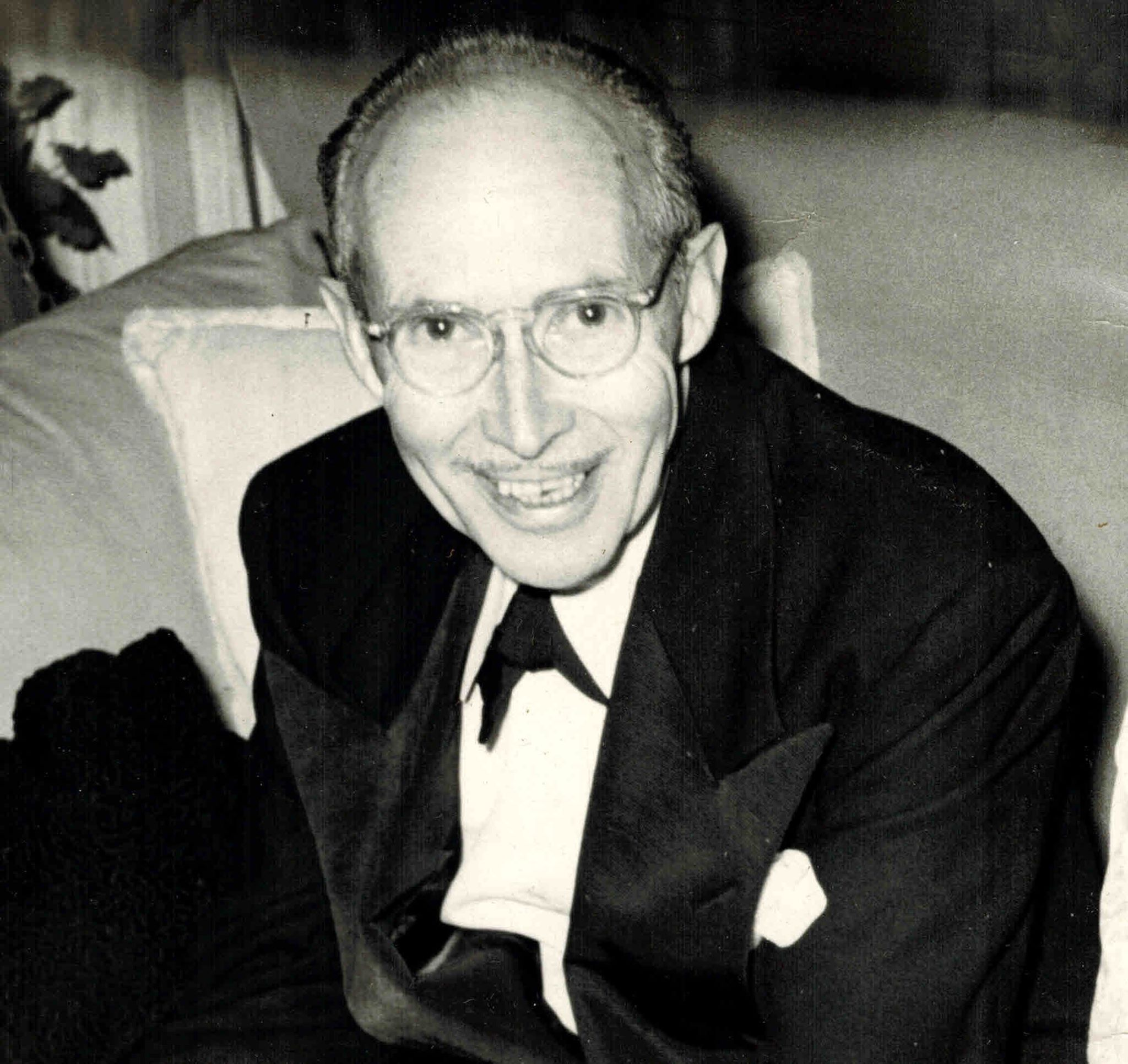
- Fraser in 1930
- Born: 31 March 1889; San Francisco, California, U.S.
- Died: 8 April 1974 (age 85); Pomona, California, U.S.
- Occupation: Film director
- Years active: 1916–1951

Harry L. Fraser (31 March 1889 – 8 April 1974) was an American film director and screenplay writer.

== Biography ==
Born in 1889 in San Francisco, Fraser directed over 80 films between 1925 and 1951, including the 1934 John Wayne film Randy Rides Alone and the Frank Buck 1937 cliffhanger serial Jungle Menace. He had a small acting role in the John Wayne film 'Neath the Arizona Skies. He also wrote screenplays.

In his autobiography, Fraser described filming a scene in Jungle Menace in which a boa constrictor attacks the heroine Dorothy (Charlotte Henry). The villain has tied Dorothy hand and foot and she thrashes about wildly, terrified when she suddenly sees the huge snake:

The snake was in no hurry. Slowly he slithered across the girl's body, while she screamed and struggled. He turned, looking for a spot to slip under her to make his first wrap. I motioned to the reptile crew to get ready, and a split-second later gave them the signal to move in. But now, the maddened snake fought them and did its best to coil around one of the men. Before that happened, however, I had cut, and we had a good cliff-hanger with our terror-stricken heroine to close the episode.

Fraser, like fellow silent-film directors William Beaudine, Christy Cabanne, Elmer Clifton, and Lambert Hillyer, was a resourceful director who could be relied upon to deliver a professional-quality feature film on ever-decreasing budgets. Fraser was exceptionally adept in this regard, as both a director and scriptwriter. He became the favorite director of the Weiss Brothers, who usually worked with tight schedules and rock-bottom budgets, and padded out their features with reels of footage taken from Weiss's older films. Fraser would be assigned to work the old films into new storylines.

Fraser's efficiency was noted by the serial unit at Columbia Pictures, where he worked as a second-unit director and scriptwriter for The Spider Returns (1941), Batman (1943), and Chick Carter, Detective (1946), among other cliffhangers.

Fraser died in 1974 in Pomona, California, eight days past his 85th birthday.

== Partial filmography ==
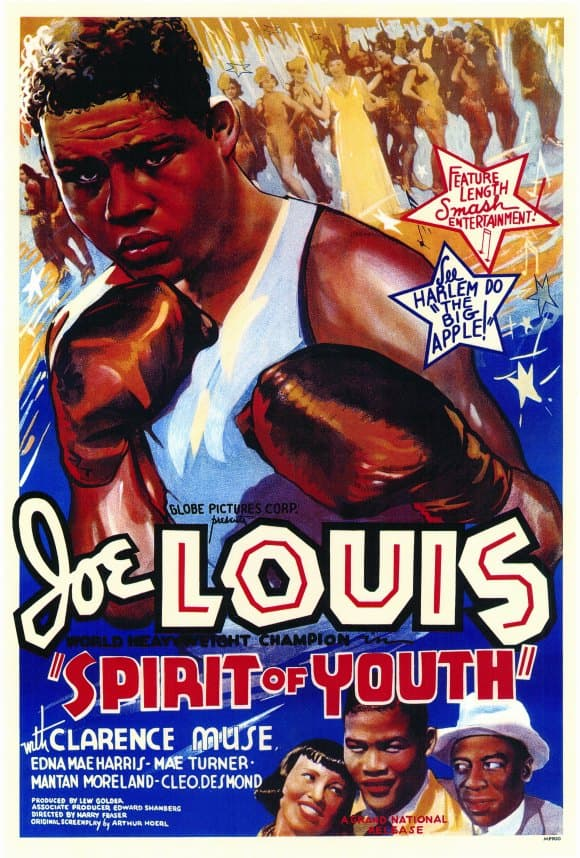
Poster for film Spirit of Youth

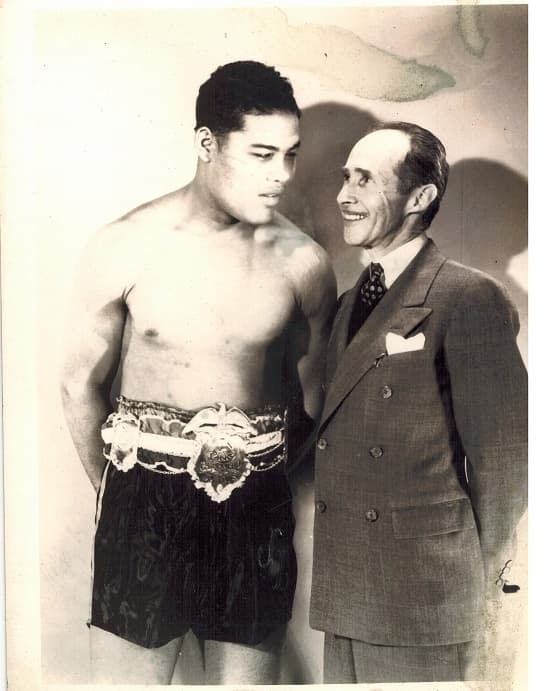
Joe Louis and Spirit of Youth director Harry L. Fraser

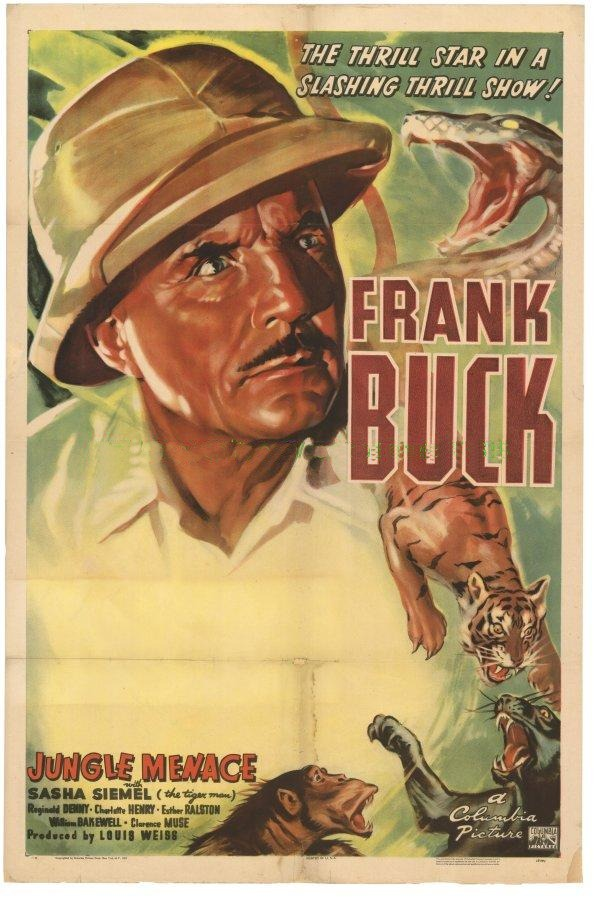
Original poster for Frank Buck in Jungle Menace (1937)

- The Iron Claw (1916) - actor
- The Mystery of the Double Cross (1917) - actor
- Burn 'Em Up Barnes (1921) - writer
- Sky's the Limit (1925)
- West of Mojave (1925)
- Soft Cushions (1927)
- Cactus Trails (1927)
- The Lone Defender (1930)
- Wings of Adventure (1930)
- The Montana Kid (1931)
- Land of Wanted Men (1931)
- The Savage Girl (1932)
- The Man from Arizona (1932)
- Without Honor (1932)
- Border Devils (1932)
- Ghost City (1932)
- Mason of the Mounted (1932)
- Law of the North (1932)
- Vanishing Men (1932)
- Honor of the Mounted (1932)
- The Night Rider (1932)
- Broadway to Cheyenne (1932)
- Breed of the Border (1933)
- The Fugitive (1933)
- The Wolf Dog (1933)
- Diamond Trail (1933)
- The Fighting Parson (1933)
- The Return of Casey Jones (1933)
- The Gallant Fool (1933)
- Galloping Romeo (1933)
- Randy Rides Alone (1934)
- Fighting Through (1934)
- 'Neath the Arizona Skies (1934)
- Social Error (1935)
- The Tonto Kid (1935)
- Wagon Trail (1935)
- Five Bad Men (1935)
- Rustler's Paradise (1935)
- Ghost Town (1936)
- Hair-Trigger Casey (1936)
- Aces Wild (1936)
- Heroes of the Alamo (1937)
- Jungle Menace (1937)
- Spirit of Youth (1938)
- Songs and Saddles (1938)
- Lure of the Wasteland (1939)
- The Spider Returns (1941)
- The Old Chisholm Trail (1942)
- The Valley of Vanishing Men (1942)
- Tenting Tonight on the Old Camp Ground (1943)
- Batman (1943 serial)
- Captain America (1944 serial)
- Brand of the Devil (1944)
- Gunsmoke Mesa (1944)
- I Accuse My Parents (1944)
- The Whispering Skull (1944)
- Enemy of the Law (1945)
- The White Gorilla (1945)
- Flaming Bullets (1945)
- Navajo Kid (1945)
- Six Gun Man (1946)
- Chick Carter, Detective (1946)
- Son of the Guardsman (1946)
- Tex Granger (1948)
- Chained for Life (1951)
- Dead or Alive (1951)
- Abilene Trail (1951)
