= I. Stanford Jolley =

American actor (1900–1978)

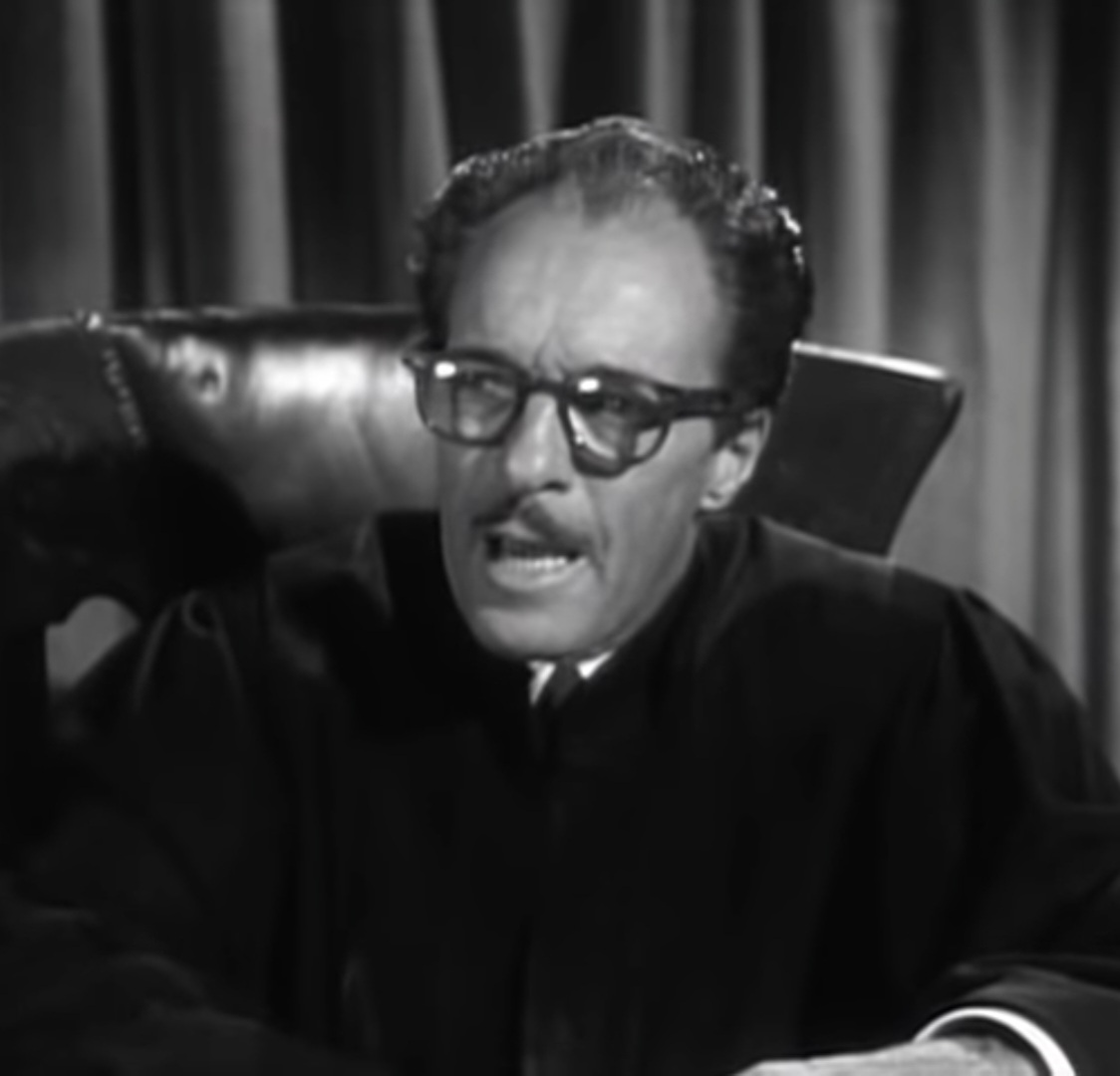
- Jolley in The Violent Years (1956)
- Born: Isaac Stanford Jolley; October 24, 1900; Elizabeth, New Jersey, U.S.
- Died: December 7, 1978 (aged 78); Woodland Hills, California, U.S.
- Resting place: Forest Lawn Memorial Park, Hollywood Hills
- Occupation: Actor
- Years active: 1936–1976
- Spouse(s): Nancy Ellen Hazeltine; Emily Jolley
- Children: 2; including Stan Jolley

Isaac Stanford Jolley (October 24, 1900 – December 7, 1978) was an American film and television actor. He starred in the 1946 film serial The Crimson Ghost, in which he played the role of Doctor Blackton and also voiced the title character.

== Life and career ==
Jolley was born in Elizabeth, New Jersey, and was raised in Morristown. He attended high school and worked with his father in his business, Jolley Electric and Radio Store. His father also co-owned a circus. Jolley performed as a vaudevillian in the 1920s.

In 1935, he settled in Hollywood, California. He began his screen career with small roles in the film Front Page Woman and the 1937 serial film Dick Tracy.

Jolley appeared in over 400 films and television productions in his career. His film appearances included Fighting Bill Carson, Arizona Roundup, Land of the Lawless, Woman Against Woman, Wild Horse Stampede, Fury at Gunsight Pass, The Private Lives of Elizabeth and Essex, The Whispering Skull, Death Rides the Plains, Calamity Jane and Sam Bass, A Christmas Carol, The Kid Rides Again, Murder in the Big House, Midnight Limited, Bad Men of Thunder Gap, Gangsters of the Frontier, Mr. Muggs Rides Again, and Black Arrow. His television appearances included Space Patrol, Gunsmoke, The Restless Gun ("The Gold Star"), Bonanza, F Troop, Man with a Camera, Rawhide, 26 Men, The Life and Legend of Wyatt Earp, The Fugitive, The Big Valley, Fury, Tales of Wells Fargo, Death Valley Days, The Virginian, Trackdown, The Rifleman, Maverick, Perry Mason, and Wagon Train. He retired in 1976. His final credit was from the western television series The Quest.

== Death ==
Jolley died on December 7, 1978, of arteriosclerotic heart disease and heart failure at Motion Picture & Television Fund cottages in Woodland Hills, California, at the age of 78. He was buried in Forest Lawn Memorial Park.
