= Jack Ingram (actor) =

American actor (1902-1969)

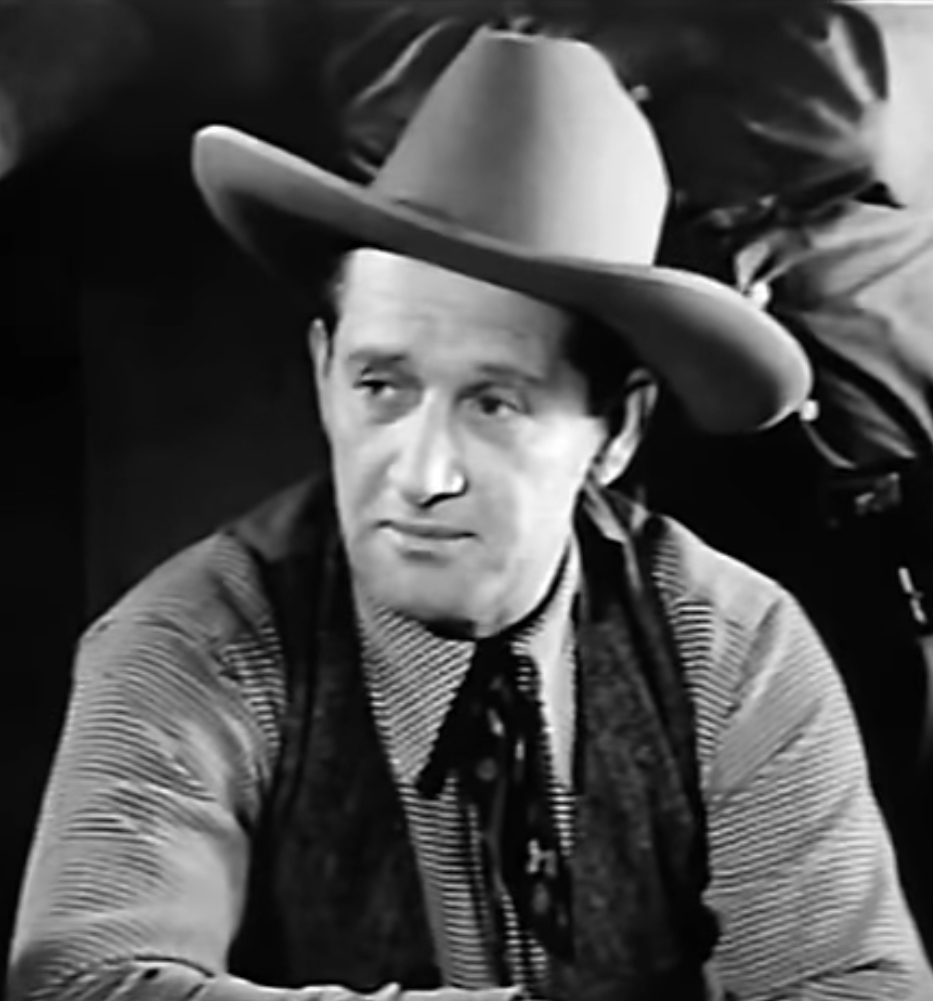
- Ingram in Arizona Roundup (1942)
- Born: John Samuel Ingram; November 15, 1902; Frankfort, Illinois, U.S.
- Died: February 20, 1969 (aged 66); Canoga Park, California, U.S.
- Resting place: Oakwood Memorial Park Cemetery
- Occupation: Actor
- Years active: 1935–1966
- Spouse: Eloise Fullerton (m. 1944)

John Samuel Ingram (November 15, 1902 – February 20, 1969) was an American film and television actor. He appeared in many serials and Westerns between 1935 and 1966.

== Biography ==
Ingram served in the U.S. Army in France. After leaving the military, he gave up plans to study law and instead joined a traveling minstrel show. He acted in stock theater with several companies before going into film. Ingram first appeared on screen in a bit part of Westward Ho (1935). His first film credit came in the serial Zorro Rides Again (1937).

In addition to acting, Ingram was a stuntman, working with horses and cars in films in the early 1930s.

He was born in Frankfort, Illinois, and died in Canoga Park, California, of a heart attack. He was interred in the Oakwood Memorial Park Cemetery in Chatsworth, California. Ingram also acquired a movie ranch in 1944; several Western films were shot there.

In 1944, Ingram married Eloise Fullerton.

== Selected appearances ==
=== Film ===
- Westward Ho (1935) – Vigilante (uncredited)
- The Singing Vagabond (1935) – Plainsman (uncredited)
- The Lonely Trail (1936)
- Winds of the Wasteland (1936)
- Hearts in Bondage (1936)
- Rebellion (1936)
- Headline Crasher (1936)
- Wild Horse Rodeo (1937)
- Valley of Terror (1937)
- Whistling Bullets (1937)
- Outlaws of Sonora (1938)
- Frontier Scout (1938)
- Phantom Gold (1938)
- Riders of the Black Hills (1938)
- Frontiers of '49 (1939)
- The Night Riders (1939)
- New Frontier (1939)
- Wyoming Outlaw (1939)
- Melody Ranch (1940)
- Ridin' the Trail (1940)
- Under Texas Skies (1940)
- The Lone Rider Ambushed (1941)
- Prairie Pioneers (1941)
- The Gang's All Here (1941)
- The Lone Rider and the Bandit (1941)
- The Lone Rider in Cheyenne (1941)
- Man from Cheyenne (1942)
- Arizona Stage Coach (1942)
- The Mysterious Rider (1942)
- Santa Fe Scouts (1943)
- Riders of the Rio Grande (1943)
- Wolves of the Range (1943)
- Arizona Trail (1943)
- Fugitive of the Plains (1943)
- Range Law (1944)
- Frontier Outlaws (1944)
- Valley of Vengeance (1944)
- The Drifter (1944)
- Oath of Vengeance (1944)
- Flame of the West (1945)
- West of the Alamo (1946)
- Blazing Across the Pecos (1948)
- Law of the West (1949)
- Sierra (1950)
- Short Grass (1950)
- Fort Dodge Stampede (1951)
- Fargo (1952)
- Thief of Damascus (1952) – Gate Guard at beheading
- Abbott and Costello Lost in Alaska (1952)
- Cow Country (1952)
- Ticket to Mexico (1952–55)
- Bad Men of Marysville (1952–55)
- Siren of Bagdad (1953) – Kazah's Man
- Five Guns West (1955) – Stephan Jethro
- Man Without a Star (1955) – Jessup (uncredited)
- A Big Hand for the Little Lady (1966)

=== Serials ===
- Undersea Kingdom (1936)
- The Vigilantes Are Coming (1936)
- Dick Tracy (1937)
- S.O.S. Coast Guard (1937)
- Zorro Rides Again (1937)
- The Lone Ranger (1937)
- Zorro Rides Again (1937)
- The Fighting Devil Dogs (1938)
- Dick Tracy Returns (1938)
- Terry and the Pirates (1940)
- Deadwood Dick (1940)
- The Green Archer (1940)
- White Eagle (1941)
- King of the Texas Rangers (1941)
- Perils of the Royal Mounted (1942)
- The Valley of Vanishing Men (1942)
- Billy the Kid Trapped (1942)
- Batman (1943)
- Devil Riders (1943)
- Manhunt of Mystery Island (1945)
- Brenda Starr, Reporter (1945)
- The Monster and the Ape (1945)
- Jungle Raiders (1945)
- The Scarlet Horseman (1946)
- Hop Harrigan (1946)
- Chick Carter, Detective (1946)
- The Mysterious Mr. M (1946)
- Jack Armstrong (1947)
- The Vigilante: Fighting Hero of the West (1947)
- The Sea Hound (1947)
- Brick Bradford (1947)
- Superman (1948)
- Tex Granger, Midnight Rider of the Plains (1948)
- Congo Bill (1948)
- Bruce Gentry (1949)
- Cody of the Pony Express (1950)
- Atom Man vs. Superman (1950)
- Don Daredevil Rides Again (1951)
- Roar of the Iron Horse, Rail-Blazer of the Apache Trail (1951)
- Captain Video: Master of the Stratosphere (1951)
- King of the Congo (1952)
- Riding with Buffalo Bill (1954)

=== TV shows ===
- The Gene Autry Show (1950–1951) – Joe / Deputy Sam / Judd Parker / The Sheriff
- The Lone Ranger (1950–1953) – Sheriff Enright / Sheriff Collins
- The Cisco Kid (1950–1954) – Sheriff / Stableman / Homer Appleby / Henchman / Jeff's Older Henchman / Rocky, Blake Henchman / Jim Hardy / Henry P. Murdock
- The Adventures of Kit Carson (1951–1953) – Henchman / Parker / Deputy Callahan
- Hopalong Cassidy (1954) – Henchman
- Buffalo Bill, Jr. (1955) – Frank Snyder / Henchman Tulsa
- The Gabby Hayes Show (1956) – Henchman / Vance Sharp / Steve Martin
- Highway Patrol (1958) – Cliff Reynolds
