= Arthur Alexander (producer) =

American film producer

- Born: 1909; Germany
- Died: 1989 (aged 79–80)
- Occupation: Independent film producer

Arthur Alexander (1909–1989) was an American independent film producer. He worked with his brother Max and produced films through various studios including their own Beacon Productions, Colony Pictures, and Max Alexander Productions.

== Biography ==
Alexander was born in Germany. He began his Hollywood career in 1934 and produced about 50 films through 1949, many westerns, all with low budgets and with no connection to the established Hollywood studios (other than the fact that his uncle was Carl Laemmle, long-time head of Universal Pictures).

With his brother Max, Alexander founded Beacon Productions, Colony Pictures, and Max Alexander Productions. He was active as producer at the short-lived Grand National Pictures from 1936 through 1939, and released through Producers Releasing Corporation afterward. Much of his work is in public domain today and accessible online.

The Alexander brothers also produced the television cartoon series Q. T. Hush (1960).

Arthur was married to Muriel and they had one child.

== Partial filmography ==
- Gun Play (1935)
- Big Boy Rides Again (1935)
- The Law of 45's (1935)
- The Shadow Strikes (1937)
- International Crime (1938)
- Here's Flash Casey (1938)
- Songs and Saddles (1938)
- Hard Guy (1941)
- I'll Sell My Life (1941)
- Today I Hang (1942)
- Lady from Chungking (1942)
- Bombs Over Burma (1942)
- The Dawn Express (1942)
- The Ghost and the Guest (1943)
- The Underdog (1943)
- Spook Town (1944)
- Gangsters of the Frontier (1944)
- Brand of the Devil (1944)
- Seven Doors to Death (1944)
- Waterfront (1944)
- Guns of the Law (1944)
- Queen of Burlesque (1946)
- Amazon Quest (1949)

=== Colony Pictures ===
- Stormy Trails (1936)
- West of Nevada (1936)
- Men of the Plains (1936)
- Law and Lead (1936)
- Idaho Kid (1936)
- Death Rides the Range (1939)
- Flaming Lead (1939)
- Lightning Strikes West (1940)
- Phantom Rancher (1940)

=== Beacon Productions ===
- Cowboy Holiday (1934)
- Thunder Over Texas (1934)
- Ticket to a Crime (1934)
- I Can't Escape (1934)
- The Fire Trap (1935)
- Danger Trails (1935)
- What Price Crime (1935)
