= Elmer Clifton =

American film director (1890–1949)

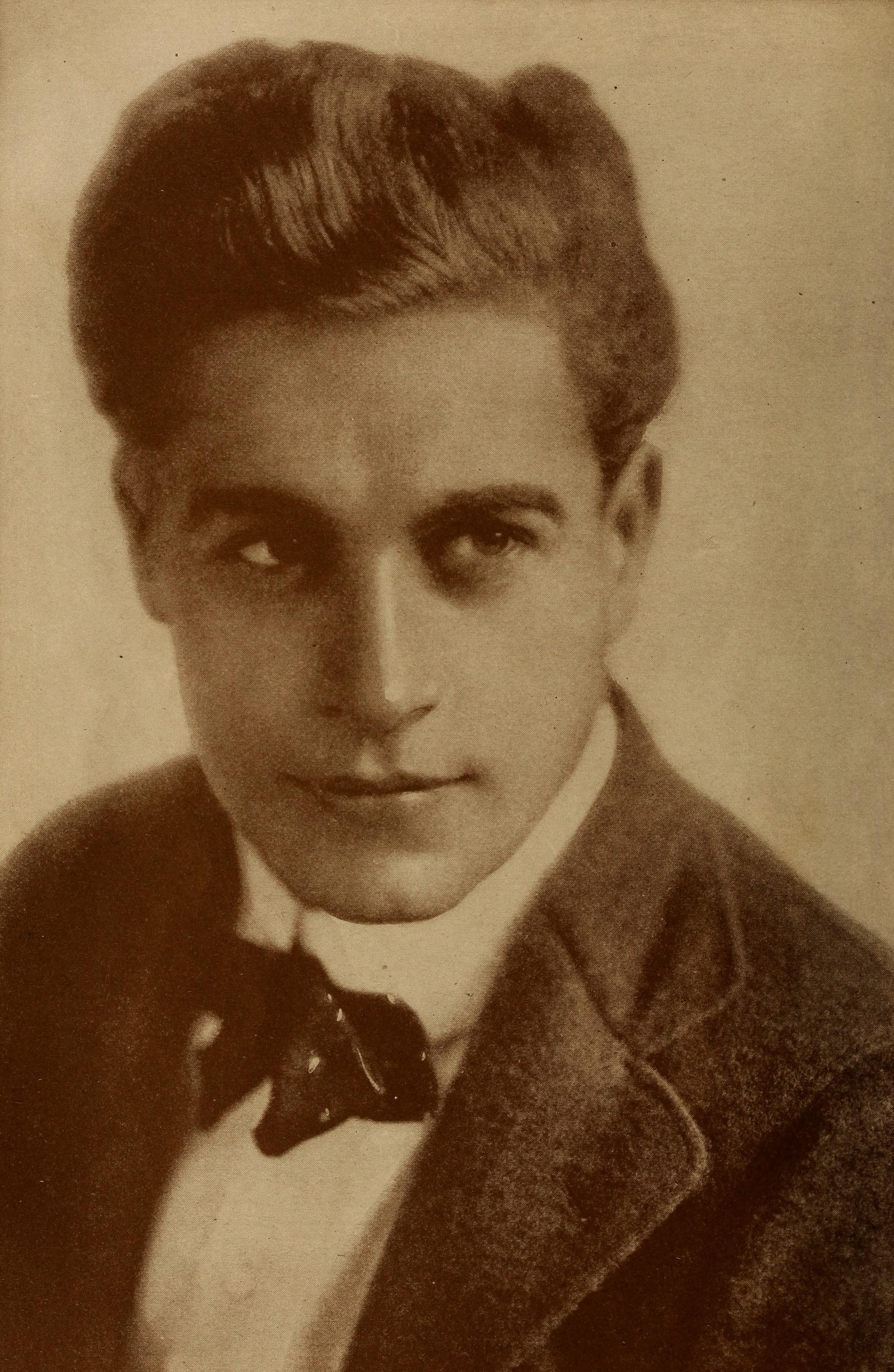
- Clifton in 1917
- Born: Elmer Clifton Forsyth; March 14, 1890; Toronto, Ontario, Canada
- Died: October 15, 1949 (aged 59); Los Angeles, California, U.S.
- Occupation(s): Film director, screenwriter, actor
- Years active: 1912–1949
- Spouse: Helen Kiely (m. 1926)
- Children: 3

Elmer Clifton Forsyth (March 14, 1890 – October 15, 1949) was an American director, screenwriter, and actor from the early silent days.

== Early life ==
Elmer Clifton Forsyth was born in Toronto, Canada, to Cecil Carl Forsyth and Margaret Nicolle.

== Career ==
A collaborator of D.W. Griffith, Clifton appeared in The Birth of a Nation (1915) and Intolerance (1916) before giving up acting in 1917 to concentrate on work behind the camera, with Griffith and Joseph Henabery as his mentors. His first feature-length solo effort as a director was The Flame of Youth with Jack Mulhall.

Clifton honed his talents during the late 1910s, directing vehicles for Mulhall and Herbert Rawlinson at Universal and then for Dorothy Gish for Famous Players–Lasky. Two of his projects with Gish, Nobody Home and Nugget Nell, featured performances from pre-stardom Rudolph Valentino. Most of this early output has been lost. He was the first filmmaker to discover the talents of Clara Bow, whom he cast in Down to the Sea in Ships, released on March 4, 1923. The independently produced film was well reviewed for its visual authenticity.

During the 1920s, Clifton directed films for several different studios. During the filming of The Warrens of Virginia (1924) for Fox Film Corporation, lead actress Martha Mansfield suffered a fatal accident from burns when her costume caught fire. Clifton directed The Wreck of the Hesperus (1927) for Cecil B. deMille's production company, and filmed on location in the Grand Canyon for The Bride of the Colorado. He also directed some Technicolor short films, including Manchu Love with an all-Asian cast.

He directed serials for Weiss Bros., Columbia, and Republic. His handling of the successful Columbia serial The Secret of Treasure Island (1938) earned him feature assignments at Columbia. During the 1940s Clifton was a staff director for PRC, working on action features and westerns. Like other silent-era veterans, he also worked in the low-budget "exploitation" field, directing Gambling with Souls (1936), Assassin of Youth (1937), Slaves in Bondage (1937), City of Missing Girls (1941), and Youth Aflame (1944). Clifton sometimes used the alias "Elmer S. Pond".

Clifton experienced a cerebral thrombosis three days into filming Not Wanted (1949), and was unable to work anymore. Producer Ida Lupino took over the direction and completed the film without screen credit.

Clifton died in 1949 of a cerebral hemorrhage shortly after the film's release. Two of his 1949 productions, both inexpensive westerns produced by Raymond Friedgen, were released posthumously.

== Personal life ==
Clifton married actress Helen Kiely on November 29, 1926. The couple had three children: Actress Dorinda Clifton, a daughter named Patricia, and a son named Michael.

== Selected filmography ==
=== Partial filmography ===
Year	Title
1917	High Speed
1917	Flirting with Death
1917	The Flame of Youth
1917	The High Sign
1917	The Man Trap
1917	Her Official Fathers
1917	The Midnight Man
1917	A Stormy Knight
1918	Hearts of the World
1918	Battling Jane
1918	Brace Up
1918	The Guilt of Silence
1918	The Eagle
1918	The Flash of Fate
1918	Kiss or Kill
1918	The Two-Soul Woman
1918	Smashing Through
1918	Winner Takes All
1919	Peppy Polly
1919	I'll Get Him Yet
1919	Boots
1919	Nugget Nell
1922	Down to the Sea in Ships
1923	Six Cylinder Love
1926	Wives at Auction
1926	The Virgin Wife
1926	The Truth About Men
1927	The Wreck of the Hesperus
1928	Let 'Er Go Gallegher
1928	Virgin Lips
1928	Beautiful But Dumb
1928	Tropical Nights
1928	The Bride of the Colorado
1929	The Devil's Apple Tree
1935	Pals of the Range
1935	Cyclone of the Saddle
1935	Rip Roaring Riley
1938	Paroled from the Big House
1938	The Secret of Treasure Island (serial)
1939	Crashing Thru
1941	I'll Sell My Life
1943	Days of Old Cheyenne
1944	Seven Doors to Death
1944	Captain America (serial)
1946	Swing, Cowboy, Swing
1949	Not Wanted
1949	The Judge
1949	Red Rock Outlaw
1950	The Silver Bandit

=== Actor ===
Year	Title	Role	Notes
1912	An Assisted Elopement	Young Tom Richmond	
1914	John Barleycorn	Jack, 3rd period	
1914	Martin Eden	Cub reporter	
1914	Burning Daylight: The Adventures of 'Burning Daylight' in Alaska	Charley Bates	
1915	The Birth of a Nation	Phil – Stoneman's Elder Son	
1915	Strathmore	Marc	
1915	The Fox Woman	Marashida	
1915	The Lily and the Rose	Allison Edwards	
1915	The Sable Lorcha	Clyde	
1916	The Missing Links	Horace Gaylord	
1916	Acquitted	Ned Fowler	
1916	The Little School Ma'am	Wilbur Howard	
1916	Intolerance	The Rhapsode	
1916	The Old Folks at Home	Steve Coburn	
1917	Nina, the Flower Girl	Jimmie	
1919	The Fall of Babylon	The Rhapsode	(final film role)
