= Dead or Alive (1944 film) =

1944 film by Elmer Clifton

- Theatrical release poster
- Directed by: Elmer Clifton
- Screenplay by: Harry L. Fraser
- Produced by: Arthur Alexander
- Starring: Tex Ritter; Dave O'Brien; Guy Wilkerson; Marjorie Clements; Rebel Randall; Ray Bennett
- Cinematography: Robert E. Cline
- Edited by: Hugh Winn
- Production company: Producers Releasing Corporation
- Distributed by: Producers Releasing Corporation
- Release date: November 9, 1944
- Running time: 56 minutes
- Country: United States
- Language: English

Dead or Alive is a 1944 American Western film directed by Elmer Clifton and written by Harry L. Fraser. The film stars Tex Ritter, Dave O'Brien, Guy Wilkerson, Marjorie Clements, Rebel Randall and Ray Bennett. The film was released on November 9, 1944, by Producers Releasing Corporation.

== Cast ==
- Tex Ritter as Tex Haines / Idaho Kid
- Dave O'Brien as Dave Wyatt
- Guy Wilkerson as Panhandle Perkins
- Marjorie Clements as Arline Arthur
- Rebel Randall as Belle Loper
- Ray Bennett as Clint Yackey
- Charles King as Red Avery
- Bud Osborne as Tom Carter
- Henry Hall as Judge Henry Wright
- Ted Mapes as Luke Brown
