= Ridin' the Trail =

1940 American film

- Theatrical release poster
- Directed by: Raymond K. Johnson
- Screenplay by: Phil Dunham
- Produced by: C.C. Burr
- Starring: Fred Scott; Harry Harvey Sr. John Ward; Jack Ingram; Iris Lancaster; Bud Osborne
- Cinematography: Elmer Dyer; Harvey Gould
- Edited by: Charles Henkel Jr.
- Production company: C.C. Burr Productions
- Distributed by: Arthur Ziehm
- Release date: July 27, 1940
- Running time: 57 minutes
- Country: United States
- Language: English

Ridin' the Trail is a 1940 American Western film directed by Raymond K. Johnson and written by Phil Dunham. The film stars Fred Scott, Harry Harvey Sr., John Ward, Jack Ingram, Iris Lancaster and Bud Osborne. The film was released on July 27, 1940, by Arthur Ziehm.

This the last of Fred Scott's thirteen singing cowboy movies. After this, Scott had supporting roles in several films, including 1942's Thundering Hoofs, and then he left the film industry to pursue a career in real estate.

== Cast ==
- Fred Scott as Fred Martin
- Harry Harvey Sr. as Fuzzy Jones
- John Ward as Pa Bailey
- Jack Ingram as Tex Walters
- Iris Lancaster as Carmencita Sanchez
- Bud Osborne as Sheriff Bradford
- Carl Mathews as Blackie
- Gene Howard as Joe Simmons
- Billy Lenhart as Butch
- James 'Buddy' Kelly as Buddy
