= Phil Dunham =

American actor and screenwriter

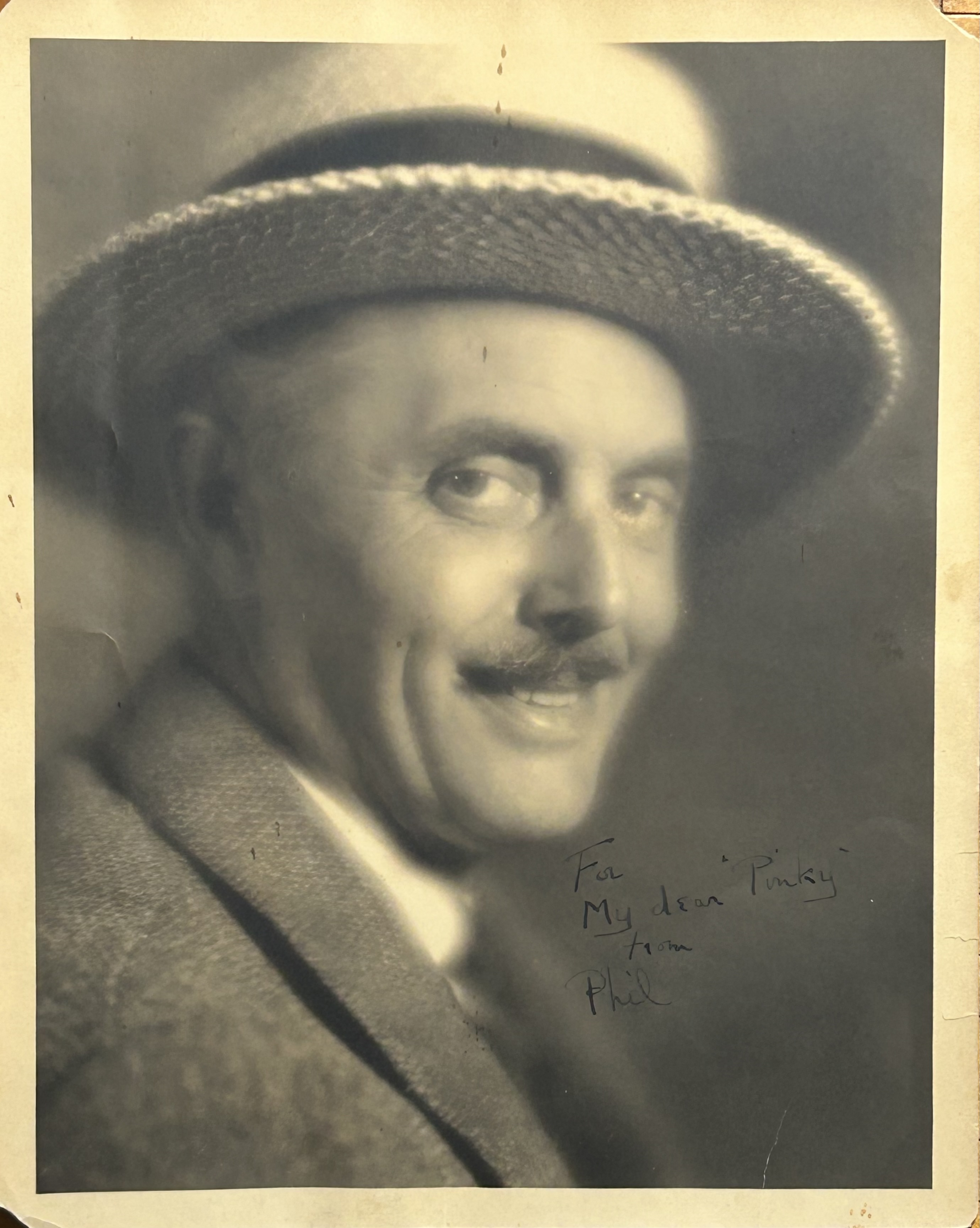
- Signed Photo
- Born: April 23, 1885; London, England, United Kingdom
- Died: September 5, 1972 (aged 87); Los Angeles, California, United States
- Occupation: Actor

Phil Dunham (April 23, 1885 – September 5, 1972) was an American actor and screenwriter.

== Biography ==
Born in London, England, Dunham had a career that spanned silent films and "talkies". His screenplays include several films with African American casts.

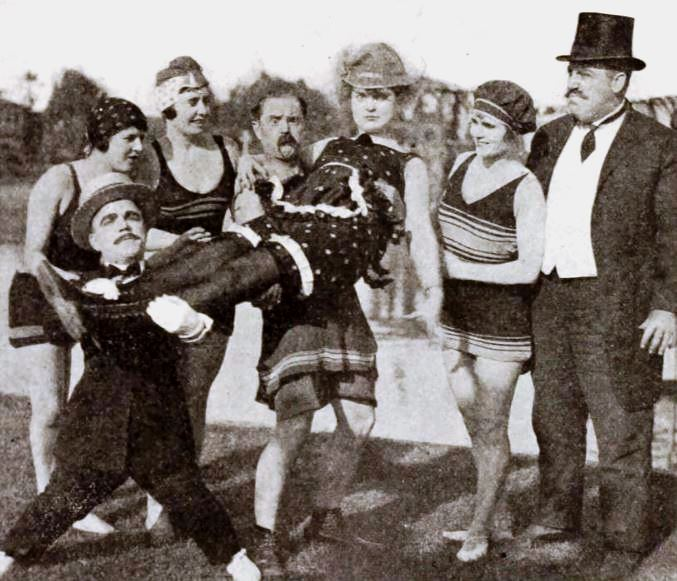
At center holding Alice Howell in Good Night, Nurse (1920)

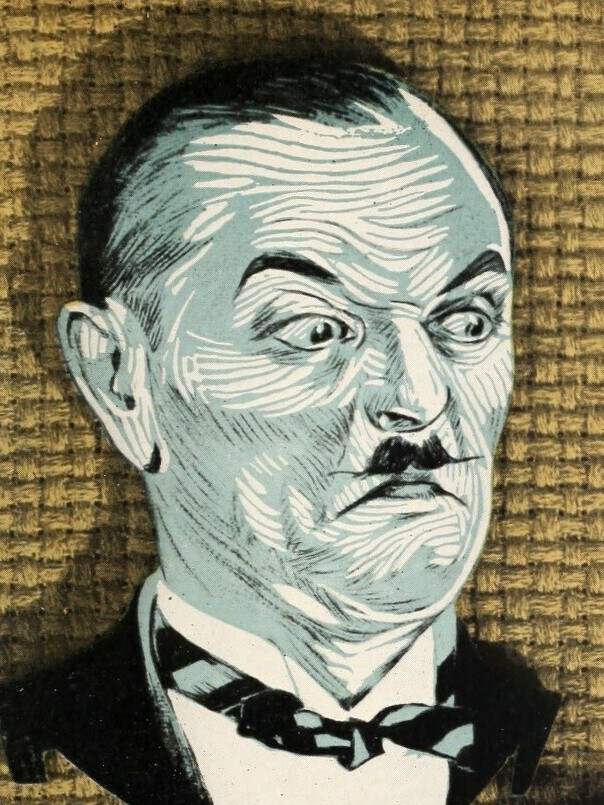
Phil Dunham art in Educational Pictures advertisement from 1926 Motion Picture News

He had leading roles in Cameo Comedies. He died in Los Angeles, California.

== Partial filmography ==
=== Actor ===
- The Heart of the Hills (1914) as Dave's Brother
- The Romance of Tarzan (1918) as Englishman
- Good Night, Nurse (1920)
- Two Minutes to Go (1921) as Professor of Spanish (as Phillip Dunham)
- The Deuce of Spades (1922)
- The Barnstormer (1922) as Stage Carpenter
- Alias Julius Caesar (1922), as Billy's Valet
- The Dangerous Maid (1923) as Private Stich
- Montana Moon (1930) as Railroad Ticket Clerk
- The Fighting Parson (1933)
- Down to Their Last Yacht (1934)
- Aces Wild (1936), as Anson
- I'll Name the Murderer (1936)
- Ghost Town (1936) as Abe Rankin
- Hair-Trigger Casey (1936) as Abner
- Gun Grit (1936) as Henchman
- Idaho Kid (1936) as Tumblebug
- Romance Rides the Range (1936) as Doctor
- Cavalcade of the West (1936) as Reporter
- Aces Wild (1936)
- Beware of Ladies (1936) as J. Robert Slank
- Feud of the West (1936)
- Navy Spy (1937) as Dr. Matthews
- Trailin' Trouble (1937) as Nester
- Bank Alarm (1937) as Leon Curtis - Bank Clerk (as Philip Dunham)
- Our Leading Citizen (1939) as Janitor
- Westbound Stage (1939) as Jefferson Wells
- West of Pinto Basin (1940) as Summers
- Thundering Hoofs (1942) as Clem, a Telegrapher
- Code of the Outlaw (1942) as Boyle
- Swing, Cowboy, Swing (1946) as Fargo Agent

=== Writer ===
- Rainbow Ranch (1933), co-writer
- Stormy Trails (1936)
- Fury Below (1936)
- I'll Name the Murderer (1936), co-writer
- Special Agent K-7 (1937), co-writer
- The Duke is Tops (1938)
- Gang Smashers (1938), co-wrote screenplay adaptation
- Life Goes On (1938)
- Two Gun Troubador (1939), co-writer
- Ridin' the Trail (1940)
