= Carl Mathews =

American actor

- Mathews, circa 1942
- Born: February 19, 1903; Oklahoma, United States
- Died: May 3, 1959 (aged 60); Los Angeles County, California, United States
- Occupation: Actor
- Years active: 1935–58

Carl Mathews (February 19, 1903 – May 3, 1959), also sometimes credited as Carl Matthews, was an American character actor and stuntman of the 1930s through 1950s. Born on February 19, 1903, in Oklahoma, his first film role would be in Rough Riding Ranger in 1935. Over the next 33 years, Mathews appeared in over 200 films, shorts, and television shows, either as a performer or a stuntman.

== Early life ==
Mathews was born in 1903 on the Cherokee reservation in Oklahoma to Sam and Hattie Mathews, and grew up in Muskogee, Oklahoma This birth year of 1903 holds throughout his census records through 1940, however, his death certificate lists his date of birth as 1899. His records in the Dawes Rolls show that he was 1/8 Cherokee. His father was a butcher. He was a veteran of World War I, and served in the merchant marines during the 1920s, although by the end of the decade he was working for the railroads as a switchman. He married his wife Margaret at some point in the 1920s, and they had a son, Carl Jr. in 1930. The family lived in Muskogee. At some point in the early 1930s, the family relocated to Los Angeles, where they had settled by 1935; it was at this point when Mathews began his career in film.

== Film career ==
Mathews began his film career with the role of Cinch Clemons in the low-budget western, Rough Riding Ranger. During his career he had roles in over 60 feature films, and appeared in over 150 others in either very small roles, as a stuntman or as a body double. Most of his roles were in the part of one of the underlings of the antagonist in the film. In addition to his acting, many of his film appearances were as a stuntman or body double. Some of the films he performed stunt work in include: Heroes of the Alamo (1937), Billy the Kid's Gun Justice (1940), Billy the Kid Trapped (1942), and Buffalo Bill Rides Again (1947); as well as movie serials such as The Great Adventures of Wild Bill Hickok. He was the body double for Fred Scott, as well as Ray "Crash" Corrigan. Later in his career, he appeared in several television series, most notably The Cisco Kid, for which he appeared in a couple of dozen episodes.

=== Filmography ===
(Per AFI database)

- The Silent Code (1935) (as Carl Matthews)
- Rough Riding Ranger (1935)
- Custer's Last Stand (1936)
- The Roaming Cowboy (1937) (as Carl Matthews)
- Melody of the Plains (1937) (as Carl Matthews)
- Moonlight on the Range (1937) (as Carl Matthews)
- Frontier Scout (1938) (as Carl Matthews)
- The Rangers' Round-Up (1938) (as Carl Matthews)
- Six-Gun Rhythm (1939)
- Wolf Call (1939)
- Code of the Fearless (1939) (as Carl Matthews)
- Trigger Pals (1939)
- Two Gun Troubador (1939)
- The Kid from Santa Fe (1940)
- The Range Busters (1940)
- Wild Horse Range (1940)
- The Sagebrush Family Trails West (1940)
- West of Pinto Basin (1940)
- Covered Wagon Trails (1940)
- Straight Shooter (1940)
- Phantom Rancher (1940) (as Carl Matthews)
- Pinto Canyon (1940)
- Ridin' the Trail (1940)
- Trailing Double Trouble (1940)
- Fugitive Valley (1941)
- Tonto Basin Outlaws (1941)
- Saddle Mountain Roundup (1941)
- The Rangers Take Over (1942) (as Carl Matthews)
- Arizona Stage Coach (1942)
- Lawless Plainsmen (1942)
- Reap the Wild Wind (1942)
- Rock River Renegades (1942)
- Texas to Bataan (1942)
- Thunder River Feud (1942)
- The Blocked Trail (1943)
- Song of the Range (1944)
- The Cisco Kid Returns (1945)
- Stars Over Texas (1946) (as Carl Matthews)
- Buffalo Bill Rides Again (1947)
- Cheyenne Takes Over (1947)
- The Fighting Vigilantes (1947)
- Law of the Lash (1947)
- Prairie Express (1947)
- Return of the Lash (1947)
- Shadow Valley (1947)
- West to Glory (1947)
- Gun Talk (1947)
- Stage to Mesa City (1947)
- Unconquered (1948)
- The Hawk of Powder River (1948)
- Overland Trails (1948)
- Partners of the Sunset (1948) (as Carl Matthews)
- Range Renegades (1948)
- Song of the Drifter (1948)
- The Westward Trail (1948)
- Haunted Trails (1949)
- Range Land (1949)
- Arizona Territory (1950)
- Crooked River (1950)
- Fence Riders (1950)
- Gunslingers (1950)
- Six Gun Mesa (1950)
- West of Wyoming (1950)
- Skipalong Rosenbloom (1951)
- Fort Osage (1952)
- Treasure of Ruby Hills (1955) (as Carl Matthews)
- Westward Ho the Wagons! (1956)

== Personal life ==
At some point shortly after Mathews entered the film industry, he divorced from his first wife, Margaret, who returned to Oklahoma with their son, to live with her mother and father. By 1940, Mathews had remarried, his new wife was named Irene. This marriage was also unsuccessful, and the two divorced. Mathews died on May 3, 1959, in Los Angeles County, California, of cirrhosis of the liver.
