= Code of the Fearless =

1939 American western film

- Theatrical release poster
- Directed by: Raymond K. Johnson
- Screenplay by: Fred Myton
- Produced by: C.C. Burr
- Starring: Fred Scott; Claire Rochelle; John Merton; Walter McGrail; George Sherwood; Harry Harvey Sr.
- Cinematography: Elmer Dyer
- Edited by: Charles Henkel Jr.
- Production company: C.C. Burr Productions
- Distributed by: Spectrum Pictures
- Release date: January 5, 1939
- Running time: 56 minutes
- Country: United States
- Language: English

Code of the Fearless is a 1939 American Western film directed by Raymond K. Johnson and written by Fred Myton. The film stars Fred Scott, Claire Rochelle, John Merton, Walter McGrail, George Sherwood and Harry Harvey Sr. The film was released on January 5, 1939, by Spectrum Pictures.

== Plot ==
Fred Jamison gets kicked out of the Rangers and starts his outlaw life, however this is just a plot between Fred and the Captain of the Rangers, so Fred can dismantle Red Kane and Jim Davis' gang from within.

== Cast ==
- Fred Scott as Fred Jamison
- Claire Rochelle as Jean Morrison
- John Merton as Red Kane
- Walter McGrail as Captain Rawlins
- George Sherwood as Jim Davis
- Harry Harvey Sr. as Old Timer
- William Woods as Li Hung Lo
- Donald Gallaher as Pete Howard
