= Kentucky Blue Streak =

- Directed by: Raymond K. Johnson
- Written by: Rose Gordon; Edward O'Brien; Homer King Gordon
- Produced by: C.C. Burr
- Starring: Edward J. Nugent; Frank Coghlan Jr. Cornelius Keefe
- Cinematography: Irvin Akers
- Edited by: Tony Martinelli
- Music by: Ben Carter; Lee Zahler
- Production company: C.C. Burr Productions
- Distributed by: Puritan Pictures
- Release date: May 1, 1935
- Running time: 60 minutes
- Country: United States
- Language: English

Kentucky Blue Streak is a 1935 American film directed by Raymond K. Johnson and starring Edward J. Nugent, Frank Coghlan Jr. and Cornelius Keefe. The film's sets were designed by the art director Vin Taylor.

It was released in the United Kingdom under the alternative title The Blue Streak.

== Plot ==
A financially-troubled Kentucky horseracing family is threatened with disgrace when the jockey brother agrees to throw a race in San Francisco and then gets mixed in a murder investigation. Meanwhile, his sister plans to enter her horse in the Kentucky Derby. Her brother escapes from jail in order to ride it to victory.

== Cast ==
- Edward J. Nugent as Martin Marion
- Frank Coghlan Jr. as Johnny Bradley
- Patricia Scott as Mary Bradley
- Cornelius Keefe as District Attorney Barton Pierce
- Margaret Mann as Mrs. Martha Bradley
- Roy D'Arcy as Harry Johnson
- Ben Holmes as Bellhop O'Donnell
- Roy Watson as Colonel Seymour
- Harry Harvey as Barker/Voice of Radio Announcer
- Roger Williams as Deputy
- Joseph W. Girard as Warden Carlson
- Walter Downing as Editor
- Ben Carter as Waiter/Colored Octette leader
- Jack Cheatham as Cop at Race Track

== See also ==
- List of films about horses
- List of films about horse racing

== Bibliography ==
- Pitts, Michael R. Poverty Row Studios, 1929-1940. McFarland & Company, 2005.
