= Call of the Rockies =

Call of the Rockies may refer to:

- Call of the Rockies (1938 film), 1938 American western film directed by Alan James
- Call of the Rockies (1944 film), 1944 American Western film directed by Lesley Selander

== See also ==
- All Faces West, a 1929 American western film also known by this title
