= Special Agent K-7 =

- Directed by: Raymond K. Johnson
- Written by: Phil Dunham; George F. Zimmer
- Produced by: C.C. Burr
- Starring: Walter McGrail; Queenie Smith; Irving Pichel
- Cinematography: Elmer Dyer
- Edited by: Charles Henkel Jr.
- Production company: C. C. Burr Productions
- Distributed by: Puritan Pictures
- Release date: September 2, 1937
- Running time: 66 minutes
- Country: United States
- Language: English

Special Agent K-7 is a 1937 American mystery film directed by Raymond K. Johnson and starring Walter McGrail, Queenie Smith and Irving Pichel. It was based on the radio series of the same title.

== Plot ==
FBI Special Agent K-7 Vince Landers investigates a series of crimes that includes the murders of Tony Black and Eddie Geller. Billy Westrop is the prime suspect.

== Cast ==
- Walter McGrail as Vince Landers
- Queenie Smith as Olive O'Day
- Irving Pichel as Lester Owens
- Donald Reed as Billy Westrop
- Willy Castello as Eddie Geller
- Duncan Renaldo as Tony Black
- Joy Hodges as Peppy
- Richard Tucker as John Adams - Chief Agent
- Malcolm McGregor as Silky Samuels
- Hans Joby as Schmidt
- George Eldredge as Ames - Prosecuting Attorney
- Henri Menjou as Smaltz
- David MacDonald as Goodwin
- William Royle as Police Capt. Hall
- Harry Harvey as Speedy
- James Guilfoyle as Kennedy
- 'Snub' Pollard as Waiter at Geller's Club
- John Ince as Judge J.B. Ellis

== Bibliography ==
- Langman, Larry & Finn, Daniel. A Guide to American Crime Films of the Thirties. Greenwood Press, 1995.
