= Victoria Vinton =

American actress

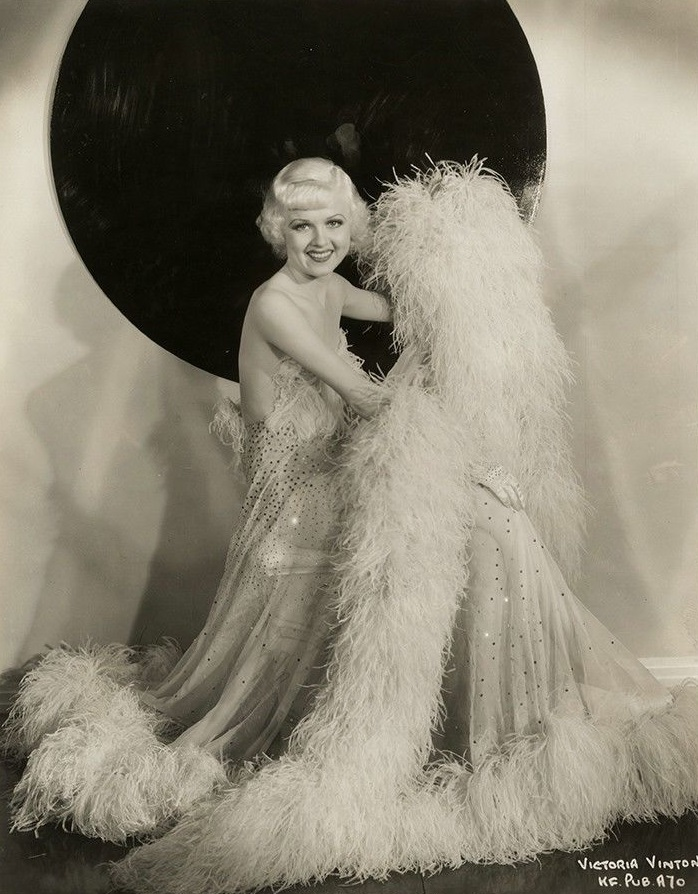
- Vinton in Fashions of 1934 (1934)
- Born: Victoria Velnette Vinton; August 23, 1912; New Jersey, US
- Died: June 12, 1980 (aged 67); Woodland Hills, California, US
- Occupation: Film actress
- Years active: 1932–1944

Victoria Vinton (August 23, 1912 – June 12, 1980), born Victoria Velnette Vinton, was an early B-movie actress, starring in over thirty films from 1932 into 1940, mostly in westerns.

== Early life ==
Born in New Jersey, she was the daughter of Victor Vinton and Lucille Vinton Strahl. She had a younger sister, Violet. Vinton was a good looking young woman in her youth, and was often called in her acting days "a Jean Harlow look alike". Victoria Vinton and her sister, Violet (1914-2003), relocated with their father to California following their parents' divorce. Their father found work alongside his brother-in-law as a motion picture cameraman, but his long hours meant that his daughters were alternately raised by their grandmother as well as an aunt and uncle. Growing up with the movie industry all around her, as a young woman, Vinton decided to pursue a show business career.

== Early career ==
Her career started with her on contract with Warner Bros., beginning in 1932. With them she made a number of successful western films, usually starring as the heroine opposite cowboy stars such as Fred Scott, Bob Custer, Reb Russell, Wally Wales, and Bill Cody.

She was best known for her work in the Busby Berkeley-musicals. She was Cinderella in the "Don't say goodnight" musical number in the movie Wonder Bar (1934), a beautiful girl in the movie Dames. Perhaps her most famous part was that of the seamstress in the musical number "Spin a Little Web of Dreams" in the movie Fashions of 1934. A favorite of director Busby Berkeley, Vinton was cast in all of his musicals in the 1930s and 1940s.

Following the end of her Warner Bros. contract, she starred in six ultra-low budget westerns with other companies. From 1932 through 1936 she was fairly active, although some were uncredited roles, but Vinton also had several starring roles, some of which were moderately successful. Her first credited role was The Seventh Commandment in 1932. In 1934 Vinton starred in Adventures of Texas Jack, and later that year she starred in Pals of the Prairie.

However, she still had not reached full star billing status, and appeared in another seven films that same year, uncredited. In 1935 she had one starring role, in The Cheyenne Tornado, but two more films, in which she was uncredited. In 1936 she starred in Ambush Valley with Bob Custer, and in Vengeance of Rannah, also with Custer as well as with John Elliott, but yet another four films in which she was uncredited. She played small parts after that, sometimes as small as a backup dancer or non-billed scene actor. Her last credited role was in 1937, when she starred in The Singing Buckaroo. She appeared uncredited in six films in 1940. Then, Vinton simply disappeared, as far as Hollywood was concerned.

== Personal life ==
Following a brief marriage that ended in annulment, Vinton wed cinematographer Charles "Scotty" Welbourne (1907-1979). The pair had one son together before divorcing in 1953. Vinton married for the third time in 1955, a union that lasted nearly 25 years until her husband died.

== Death ==
Vinton did not reappear publicly until her death, in June, 1980, while living in Woodland Hills, California. Sadly, in June of 1980, Victoria Vinton took her own life. Though her actual date of death could not be clearly established, her body was found exactly one year to the day after her husband, Jack (1901–1979), died. In addition to her son and her sister, her father, Victor (1888-1983), was among her survivors.

She is buried at the Forest Lawn Memorial Park.

== Selected filmography ==
- The Seventh Commandment (1932)
- Massacre (1934)
- Merry Wives of Reno (1934)
- The Cheyenne Tornado (1935)
- Ambush Valley (1936)
- Vengeance of Rannah (1936)
- The Singing Buckaroo (1937)
- Adventures of Texas Jack (1934)
- Strike Up the Band (1940)
