= Gladys Foster =

Gladys Foster may refer to:

- Gladys Johnston née Foster (1906–1983), Canadian artist
- Gladys Foster, character in Legion
