= Grand Parade =

Grand Parade can refer to:

- Grand Parade (Brighton), England
- Grand Parade (Cape Town), South Africa
- Grand Parade, Cork, Ireland
- Grand Parade (Gibraltar)
- Grand Parade (Halifax), Nova Scotia
- Grand Parade, a section of Green Lanes (London), Harringay
- Grand Parade (horse), the winner of the 1919 Epsom Derby
- Grand Parade, a 1997 album by the Frank and Walters
- The Grand Parade, a 1930 American film
