= North of Nome =

North of Nome may refer to:

- North of Nome (1925 film), a silent American film
- North of Nome (1936 film), an American sound film
