= Land of the Six Guns =

- Directed by: Raymond K. Johnson
- Screenplay by: Carl Krusada
- Produced by: Harry S. Webb
- Starring: Jack Randall; Louise Stanley; Frank LaRue; Glenn Strange; Bud Osborne; George Chesebro
- Cinematography: William Hyer; Edward A. Kull
- Edited by: Robert Golden
- Production company: Metropolitan Pictures
- Distributed by: Monogram Pictures
- Release date: May 9, 1940
- Running time: 54 minutes
- Country: United States
- Language: English

Land of the Six Guns is a 1940 American Western film directed by Raymond K. Johnson and written by Carl Krusada. The film stars Jack Randall, Louise Stanley, Frank LaRue, Glenn Strange, Bud Osborne and George Chesebro. The film was released on May 9, 1940, by Monogram Pictures.

== Cast ==
- Jack Randall as Jack Rowan
- Louise Stanley as Carol Howard
- Frank LaRue as John Howard
- Glenn Strange as Manny
- Bud Osborne as Sheriff
- George Chesebro as Taylor
- Steve Clark as Frank Stone
- Kenne Duncan as Max
- Richard Cramer as Mexican Joe
- Jack Perrin as Davis
- Carl Mathews as Drake
