= Esther Muir =

American actress (1903–1995)

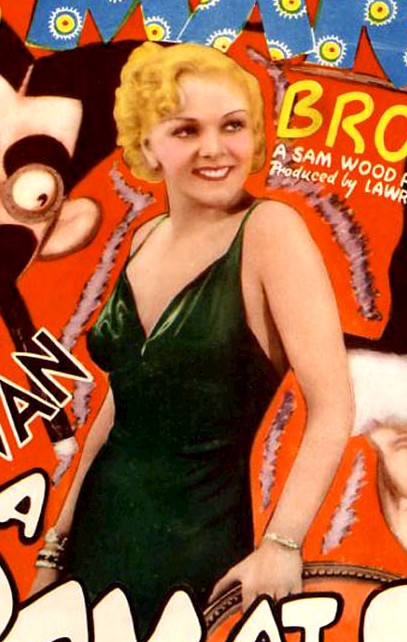
- Muir in lobby card from A Day At The Races (1937)
- Born: March 11, 1903; Andes, New York, U.S.
- Died: August 1, 1995 (aged 92); Mount Kisco, New York, U.S.
- Occupation: Actor
- Years active: 1922–1945
- Spouses: Sam Coslow (m. 1934; div. 1948) Busby Berkeley (m. 1929; div. 1931): Richard Brown (m. 19??; div. 19??)
- Children: 1

Esther Muir (March 11, 1903 – August 1, 1995) was an American actress on Broadway and in Hollywood films.

== Early years ==
Born in Andes, New York, Muir had six sisters and three brothers. She began modeling in New York City while still a high school student.

== Career ==
=== Stage ===
While she was in high school, Muir became a showgirl in the Greenwich Village Follies (1922). She participated in the International Review, Majestic Theatre and in The Earl Carroll Vanities.

=== Film ===
Muir appeared with the Marx Brothers in A Day At The Races (1937). She toured with the Marxes in a stage version where material from the movie was rehearsed and crafted prior to filming. Muir described the Marx Brothers as diligent comic actors who sometimes worked days and weeks on a scene to perfect it. "We played pranks and had many laughs in spite of the hard and messy work. The Marx Brothers ad-libbed funnier material than the four top writers could concoct for them. It was an unforgettable experience, as well as a lucrative ordeal." Her other screen credits include roles in I'll Take Romance (1937), City Girl (1938), and The Girl and the Gambler (1939).

"The disappointment of my life was failure to play Belle Watling in Gone With the Wind. Some people had written in and suggest me for the part, and David Selznick sent the script to me. I was on cloud nine. I shall never forget the producer saying, 'I have run several of your pictures and admire your work. Every time you play a tough character, however, some sweetness comes through. Someday I will use you.' He sensed my great disappointment."

== Personal life and death ==
An introduction by columnist Walter Winchell eventually led to Muir's marriage to Hollywood director and choreographer Busby Berkeley. They were married in Baltimore, Maryland, in November 1929 and were divorced in 1931. "His mother was widowed when Bus was a little boy, so she kept him on a leash until he married," she said in 1990. "I was my husband's keeper, but she continued to collect his salary. Her delusions of glamour, with a Park Avenue apartment in New York, a mansion in Dover and Loretta Young's mansion in Beverly Hills, required a Getty income to cover her expenses. I was left with the bills for our little Hollywood apartment and the necessities of life." She originally quit working to focus on her husband but the need for money prompted her to accept a role in a My Girl Friday! revival, which eventually led to the divorce.

On January 3, 1932, Muir and actor Rex Lease announced their engagement. No date had been set for the wedding, and the two were awaiting final decrees in divorce actions.

Muir married composer/producer Sam Coslow in Mexicali, Mexico, on November 1, 1934. The couple repeated their wedding vows a year later in Ventura, California. The marriage ended in divorce in 1948. Her daughter, Jacqueline Coslow, became an actress and married actor Ted Sorel (né Theodore Eliopoulos).

Muir was also married to Richard Brown, president of General Time Corporation.

Muir developed real estate in southern California in the 1950s. Four hundred tract homes were among the projects that she supervised. She briefly had polio but completely recovered in two years.

On August 1, 1995, Muir died at Northern Westchester Hospital in Mount Kisco, New York, aged 92. She had lived in Somers, New York.

== Filmography ==
- Joy Ride (1929) as Esther Studebaker (uncredited)
- A Dangerous Affair (1931) as Peggy
- Sailor's Luck (1933) as Minnie Broadhurst
- Sweepings (1933) as Violet
- Wine, Women and Song (1933) as Lolly
- The Woman Who Dared (1933) as Mae Compton
- So This Is Africa (1933) as Mrs. Johnson-Martini
- I Love That Man (1933) as Babe - Masseuse
- His Weak Moment (1933, Short)
- Broadway Thru a Keyhole (1933) as Chorus girl (uncredited)
- Hell and High Water (1933) as Barney's mother
- Public Stenographer (1934) as Lucille 'Lucy' Weston
- Caravan (1934) as Beer Garden Band Leader (uncredited)
- Unknown Blonde (1934) as Mrs. Vail
- Picture Brides (1934) as Flo Lane, Bleach-Blond Bride
- The Party's Over (1934) as Tillie (uncredited)
- The Gilded Lily (1935) as Divorcee (uncredited)
- Here's to Romance (1935) as Pianist (uncredited)
- The Gay Deception (1935) as Spellek's Wife (uncredited)
- It Always Happens (1935, Short) as Jane, Andy's Sister-in-Law
- Racing Luck (1935) as Elaine Bostwick
- Coronado (1935) as Hotel Guest (uncredited)
- The Great Ziegfeld (1936) as Burlesque Prima Donna (uncredited)
- The First Baby (1936) as Tough Guy's Girl (uncredited)
- Fury (1936) as Girl in Apartment Listening to Radio (uncredited)
- A Girl's Best Years (1936, Short) as Gold Digger (uncredited)
- High Hat (1937) as Carmel Prevost
- A Day at the Races (1937) as Cokey 'Flo'
- On Again-Off Again (1937) as Nettie Horton
- I'll Take Romance (1937) as Panda
- Under Suspicion (1937) as Frances
- Love on Toast (1937) as Julie
- City Girl (1938) as Flo Nichols
- Romance in the Dark (1938) as Prima Donna
- Battle of Broadway (1938) as Opal Updyke
- Three Comrades (1938) as Frau Schmidt (uncredited)
- The Toy Wife (1938) as Blonde Woman (uncredited)
- Sunset Murder Case (1938) as Lora Wynne
- The Law West of Tombstone (1938) as Madame Mustache
- Western Jamboree (1938) as Duchess
- The Story of Vernon and Irene Castle (1939) as Minor Role (uncredited)
- The Girl and the Gambler (1939) as Madge
- Misbehaving Husbands (1940) as Grace Norman
- Stolen Paradise (1940) as Mrs. Ellen Gordon
- Honky Tonk (1941) as Prostitute (uncredited)
- The Mayor of 44th Street (1942) as Hilda, Telephone Operator
- X Marks the Spot (1942) as Bonnie Bascomb (final film role)

== Bibliography ==
- Ankerich, Michael G (January 1, 1998). The Sound of Silence: Conversations with 16 Film and Stage Personalities. Jefferson, NC: McFarland & Company, Inc. p. 260. ISBN 9780786405046. OCLC 743217471.
- Fresno Bee, "Marriage of Song Writer, Esther Muir Revealed", Wednesday, September 25, 1935, Page 6A.
- The New York Times, "Esther Muir, 92, Character Actress", August 9, 1995, Page D20.
- The Oshkosh Northwestern, "Hollywood Roundup", May 22, 1937, Page 10.
