= Walter McGrail =

American actor (1888–1970)

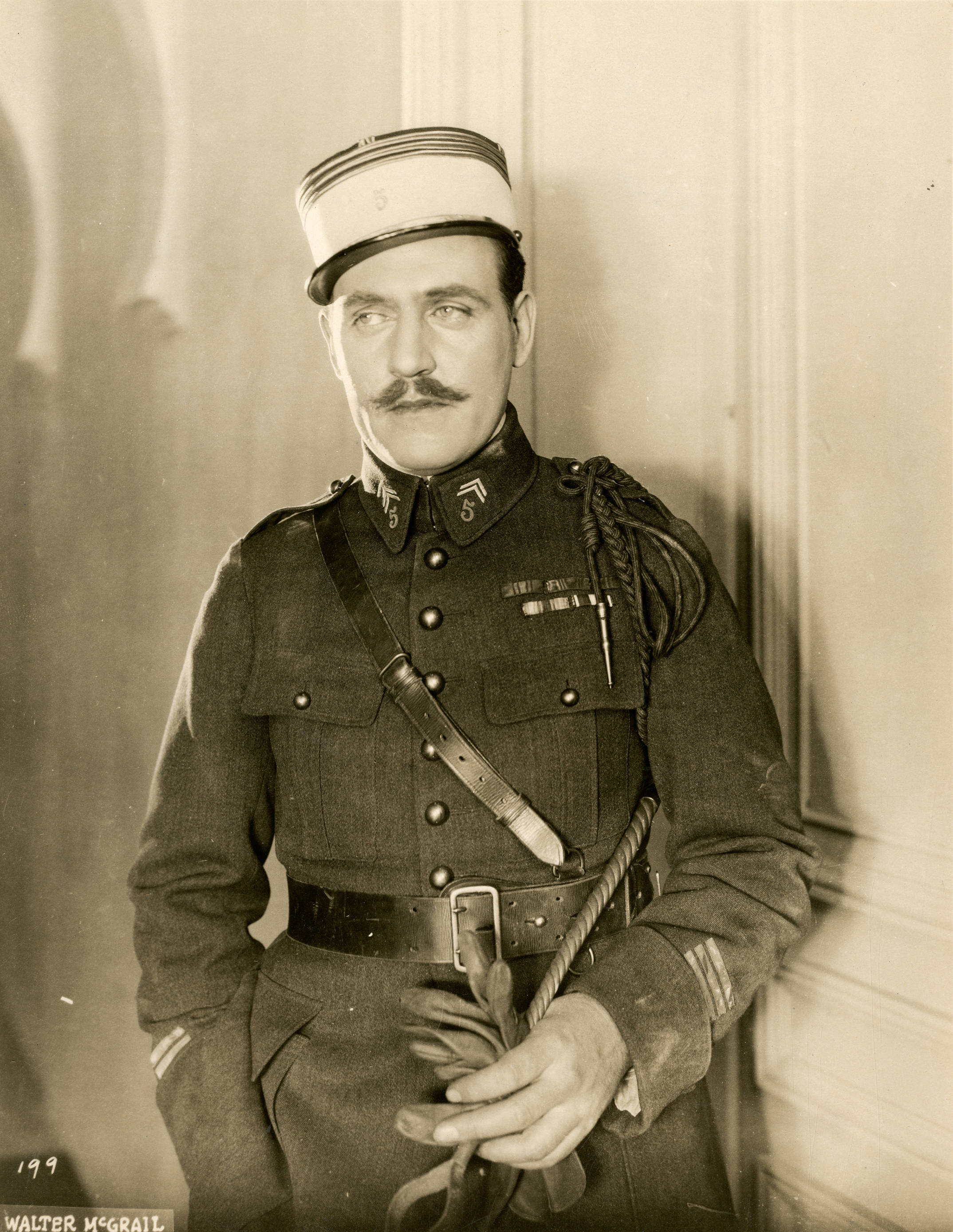
- McGrail in 1924
- Born: Walter B. McGrail; October 19, 1888; Brooklyn, New York, U.S.
- Died: March 19, 1970 (aged 81); San Francisco, California, U.S.
- Occupation: Actor
- Years active: 1916–1951

Walter B. McGrail (October 19, 1888 – March 19, 1970) was an American film actor. He appeared in more than 150 films between 1916 and 1951. Besides feature films, he appeared in The Scarlet Runner, a 12-chapter serial.

McGrail was born in Brooklyn, New York, and died in San Francisco, California, at the age of 81.

== Selected filmography ==
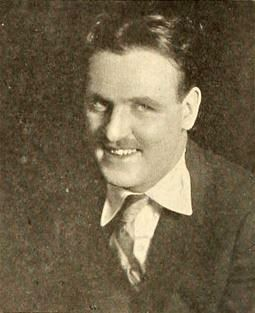
McGrail in Motion Picture News, 1919

- Thou Art the Man (1916) – Bearer
- The Ordeal of Elizabeth (1916) – Elizabeth's Father
- Lights of New York (1916) – Hawk Chovinski
- The Scarlet Runner (1916) – Morley Chester
- The Dollar and the Law (1916) – George Gray
- Indiscretion (1917) – Jimmy Travers
- The Courage of Silence (1917) – Saunders
- Womanhood, the Glory of the Nation (1917) – Count Dario
- Within the Law (1917) – Dick Gilder
- Over There (1917) – Minor Role
- The Song of the Soul (1918) – Dr. Evans
- The Business of Life (1918) –
- The Triumph of the Weak (1918) – Jim Roberts
- Find the Woman (1918) – Maurice Dumars
- To the Highest Bidder (1918) – David Whitcomb
- Everybody's Girl (1918) – Blinker
- Miss Ambition (1918) – Larry Boyle
- Brown of Harvard (1918) – Gerald Thorne
- The Adventure Shop (1919) – Josephus Potts, Jr
- The Girl, Glory (1919) – Ernest Sanford
- The Country Cousin (1919) – George Tewksbury Reynolds III
- The Black Secret (1919) – Ray McKay
- Greater Than Fame (1920) – Jack Martin
- Blind Youth (1920) – Maurie Monnier
- The Invisible Divorce (1920) – Jimmy Ryder
- Life's Twist (1920) – Steven De Koven
- Darling Mine (1920) – Roger Davis
- Beware of the Bride (1920) – Billy Emerson
- Habit (1921) – Charles Munson
- The Breaking Point (1921) – Richard Janeway
- Playthings of Destiny (1921) – Hubert Randolph
- Pilgrims of the Night (1921) – Gilbert Hannaway
- The Invisible Fear (1921) – Arthur Comstock
- Her Mad Bargain (1921) – David Leighton
- The Cradle (1922) – Courtney Webster
- The Top of New York (1922) – Emery Gray
- The Yosemite Trail (1922) – Ned Thorpe
- The Kentucky Derby (1922) – Ralph Gordon
- Nobody's Money (1923) – Frank Carey
- Suzanna (1923) – Ramón
- Is Divorce a Failure? (1923) – Kelcey Barton
- Where the North Begins (1923) – Gabrielle Dupree
- The Eleventh Hour (1923) – Dick Manley
- The Bad Man (1923) – Morgan Pell
- Lights Out (1923) – Sea Bass
- Flaming Youth (1923) – Jamieson James
- A Son of the Sahara (1924) – Captain Jean Duval
- Unguarded Women (1924) – Larry Trent
- Gerald Cranston's Lady (1924) – Gordon Ibbotsleigh
- Is Love Everything? (1924) – Boyd Carter
- The Dancers (1925) – The Argentine
- Adventure (1925) – Tudor
- Champion of Lost Causes (1925) – Zanten / Dick Sterling
- The Mad Marriage (1925)
- Her Husband's Secret (1925)
- The Teaser (1925) – Roderick Caswell
- The Scarlet West (1925) – Lt. Harper
- Havoc (1925) – Roddy Dunton
- A Son of His Father (1925) – Holdbrook
- When the Door Opened (1925) – Clive Grenfal
- Forbidden Waters (1926) – J. Austin Bell
- The Combat (1926) – Milton Symmons
- Marriage License? (1926) – Marcus Heriot
- Across the Pacific (1926) – Capt. Grover
- The City (1926) – Jim Hannock
- Prisoners of the Storm (1926) – Sergeant McClellan
- The Secret Studio (1927) – Mr. Kyler
- Old San Francisco (1927) – Vasquez's Grandson – in Prologue
- American Beauty (1927) – Claverhouse
- Man Crazy (1927) – Van Breamer
- Stop That Man! (1928) – 'Slippery Dick' Sylvaine
- Midnight Madness (1928) – Childers
- The Play Girl (1928) – David Courtney
- The Old Code (1928) – Pierre Belleu
- Confessions of a Wife (1928) – Henri Duval
- Blockade (1928) – Hayden
- Hey Rube! (1928) – Duke
- The Veiled Woman (1929) – Diplomatic Attaché
- River of Romance (1929) – Major Patterson
- The Lone Star Ranger (1930) – Phil Lawson
- Men Without Women (1930) – Joe Cobb
- Soldiers and Women (1930) – Capt. Arnold
- Women Everywhere (1930) – Lieutenant of Legionnaires
- Anybody's War (1930) – Captain Davis
- The Last of the Duanes (1930) – Bland
- The Pay-Off (1930) – Emory
- River's End (1930) – Sergeant Martin
- Part Time Wife (1930) – Johnny Spence
- Seas Beneath (1931) – Chief Joe Cobb
- Night Nurse (1931) – Mack, the Drunk
- Murder by the Clock (1931) – Herbert Endicott
- Under Eighteen (1931) – Gregg (uncredited)
- Night Beat (1931) – Martin Andrews
- Union Depot (1932) – Pickpocket (uncredited)
- The Last of the Mohicans (1932, Serial) – Dulac
- McKenna of the Mounted (1932) – Inspector Oliver P. Logan
- Exposed (1932) – Johnny Russo
- Vanity Street (1932) – Detective Hanson (uncredited)
- Robbers' Roost (1932) – Henchman Brad
- State Trooper (1933) – Burman
- Police Call (1933) – Dr. James A. Gordon
- Sing Sinner Sing (1933) – Louis
- David Harum (1934) – Townsman (uncredited)
- The World Moves On (1934) – The Duallist (1825)
- A Demon for Trouble (1934) – Dyer
- The Lemon Drop Kid (1934) – Racetrack Tout (uncredited)
- Men of the Night (1934) – Louie
- All the King's Horses (1935) – Baron Kurt Chizlinska (uncredited)
- Sunset Range (1935) – Grant
- The Glass Key (1935) – Fickle Madvig Supporter (uncredited)
- Hard Rock Harrigan (1935) – Worker (uncredited)
- Call of the Wild (1935) – Spectator (uncredited)
- Special Agent K-7 (1936) – Vincent 'Lanny' Landers
- The Plainsman (1936) – Gambler #1 (uncredited)
- The Accusing Finger (1936) – Guard (uncredited)
- Ten Laps to Go (1936) – Drake – DeSylva's Mechanic
- Reefer Madness (1936) – The Boss (uncredited)
- The Shadow Strikes (1937) – Winstead Comstock
- The Fighting Deputy (1937) – Townsman (uncredited)
- The Mysterious Pilot (1937) – Jordan (uncredited)
- West of Rainbow's End (1938) – George Reynolds aka Johnson
- Held for Ransom (1938) – Donnelly
- On the Great White Trail (1938) – Garou
- Code of the Fearless (1939) – Ranger Capt. Rawlins
- In Old Montana (1939) – Joe Allison
- Stagecoach (1939) – Capt. Sickel (uncredited)
- The Sun Never Sets (1939) – Henchman DaCosta (uncredited)
- Calling All Marines (1939) – Capt. Chester
- The Green Hornet (1940, Serial) – Dean
- The Grapes of Wrath (1940) – Gang Leader (uncredited)
- My Little Chickadee (1940) – Townsman (uncredited)
- Billy the Kid Outlawed (1940) – Judge Fitzgerald
- Marked Men (1940) – Doctor (uncredited)
- The Son of Monte Cristo (1940) – Minor Role (uncredited)
- Mysterious Doctor Satan (1940) – Stoner
- Back Street (1941) – Reporter (uncredited)
- Along the Rio Grande (1941) – Cattle Buyer (uncredited)
- Last of the Duanes (1941) – Texas Ranger (uncredited)
- Appointment for Love (1941) – Stoddard (uncredited)
- Holt of the Secret Service (1941, Serial) – Ship Captain (uncredited)
- Dick Tracy vs. Crime, Inc. (1941, Serial) – Junction Heavy 1 / Marine Captain (uncredited)
- Billy the Kid Trapped (1942) – Judge Jack McConnell
- Riders of the West (1942) – Miller, the Banker
- Bowery at Midnight (1942) – Coroner (uncredited)
- A Double Life (1947) – Steve (uncredited)
- A Life of Her Own (1950) – Party Guest (uncredited)
- Here Comes the Groom (1951) – Newsreel Director (uncredited)
