= Two Gun Troubador =

- Theatrical release poster
- Directed by: Raymond K. Johnson
- Screenplay by: Richard L. Bare; Phil Dunham
- Produced by: C.C. Burr
- Starring: Fred Scott; Claire Rochelle; John Merton; Harry Harvey Sr. Carl Mathews; William Woods
- Cinematography: Elmer Dyer; Walter Bluemel
- Edited by: Charles Henkel Jr.
- Production company: C.C. Burr Productions
- Distributed by: Spectrum Pictures
- Release date: March 5, 1939
- Running time: 58 minutes
- Country: United States
- Language: English

Two Gun Troubador is a 1939 American Western film directed by Raymond K. Johnson and written by Richard L. Bare and Phil Dunham. The film stars Fred Scott, Claire Rochelle, John Merton, Harry Harvey Sr., Carl Mathews and William Woods. The film was released on March 5, 1939, by Spectrum Pictures.

== Cast ==
- Fred Scott as Fred Dean Jr.
- Claire Rochelle as Helen Bradfield
- John Merton as Bill Barton
- Harry Harvey Sr. as Elmer Potts
- Carl Mathews as Kirk Dean
- William Woods as Sheriff Holbrook
- Billy Lenhart as Fred Dean
- James 'Buddy' Kelly as Tom Bradfield
- Gene Howard as Pedro Yorba
- Harry Harvey Jr. as Bill Barton
- John Ward as Fred Dean Sr.
