= Luana Walters =

American actress (1912–1963)

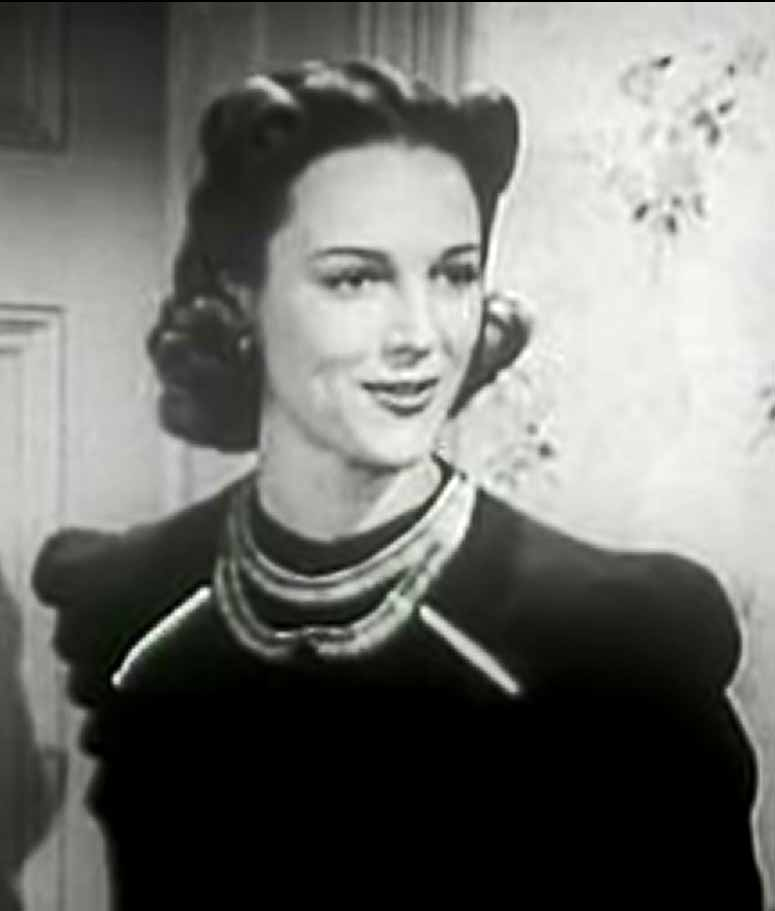
- Luana Walters as Jane Forbes in Misbehaving Husbands (1940)
- Born: July 22, 1912; Los Angeles, California, U.S.
- Died: May 19, 1963 (aged 50); Los Angeles, California, U.S.
- Occupation: Actress
- Years active: 1930–1956
- Known for: Western movies
- Spouse: Max Hoffman, Jr. (m. 1936; died 1945)

Luana Walters (July 22, 1912 – May 19, 1963) was an American motion picture actress from Los Angeles, California.

== Biography ==
Her film career began when she visited a friend on a United Artists lot. Douglas Fairbanks, Sr. was excited about her screen possibilities and arranged for a film test. However, only three days later Fairbanks went to Europe, and the test was only partially completed. Not long afterwards Joe Schenck saw Walters on the dance floor at the Cocoanut Grove in Los Angeles, California. After viewing the abbreviated test made by Fairbanks, Schenck offered her a contract with United Artists. The studio did not make a movie in the next six months so Walters' option was not taken up.

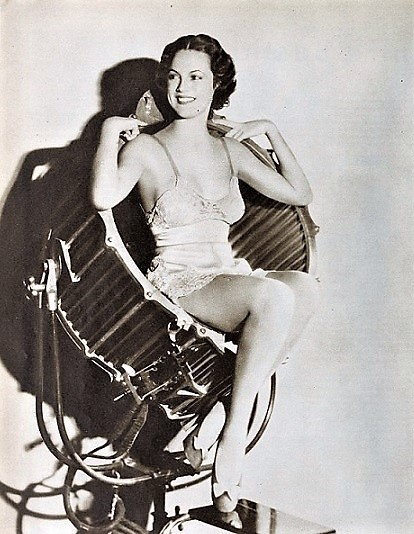
Luana Walters in 1933

Walters' screen credits start with an uncredited role in Reaching for the Moon (1930). Her skill as an equestrian helped her in parts in westerns like Ride 'Em Cowboy (1936), Where the West Begins (1938), Mexicali Rose (1939), and Law of the Wolf (1939). On several occasions Walters made films in which her work was left in the cutting room, from the final edit. This began when she made Reaching for the Moon with Fairbanks. Her parts were also deleted from Spawn of the North (1938) and Souls at Sea (1937). The former was a Henry Fonda feature and the latter paired Walters with Robert Cummings.

Walters appeared in "Superman Comes to Earth", the first chapter of the 1948 Superman movie serial starring Kirk Alyn as Superman. Portions of this depiction appear in flashback in "At the Mercy of Atom Man!", the seventh chapter of the 1950 serial Atom Man vs. Superman. She worked in a number of movie serials and B-Movies, especially in Westerns, featuring her riding skills, and sci-fi or horror genres. She played a female reporter on the trail of a fiend's story in The Corpse Vanishes (1942), with Bela Lugosi. She appears as a cellblock guard in Girls in Prison (1956). Her final role came in The She Creature (1956).

== Selected filmography ==
- Reaching for the Moon (1930) - Minor Role (uncredited)
- Two Seconds (1932) - Tart (uncredited)
- Miss Pinkerton (1932) - First Nurse (uncredited)
- End of the Trail (1932) - Luana
- Fighting Texans (1933) - JoAnn Carver
- Secrets of Hollywood (1933) - A Young Actress
- Midshipman Jack (1933) - Gloria (uncredited)
- The Merry Widow (1934) - Maid to Sonia (uncredited)
- The Third Sex (1934) - Elinor Gordon
- Broadway Melody of 1936 (1935) - Showgirl (uncredited)
- The Speed Reporter (1936) - May
- Aces and Eights (1936) - Juanita Hernandez
- Suzy (1936) - Check Room Girl (uncredited)
- Ride 'Em Cowboy (1936) - Lillian Howard
- Shadow of Chinatown (1936, Serial) - Sonya Rokoff, aka The Dragon Lady [Chs. 1-14]
- Under Strange Flags (1937) - Dolores de Vargas
- A Star Is Born (1937) - (uncredited)
- Souls at Sea (1937) - Eloise (uncredited)
- Youth on Parole (1937) - Salesgirl (uncredited)
- The Buccaneer (1938) - Suzette
- Algiers (1938) - Native Waitress (uncredited)
- Where the West Begins (1938) - Lynne Reed
- Assassin of Youth (1938) - Joan Barry
- Marie Antoinette (1938) - Woman in Gaming House (uncredited)
- Thanks for the Memory (1938) - Model (uncredited)
- Say It in French (1938) - Hat Check Girl (uncredited)
- Disbarred (1939) - Office Worker (uncredited)
- Paris Honeymoon (1939) - Angela
- St. Louis Blues (1939) - Dancer (uncredited)
- Cafe Society (1939) - Cigarette Girl (uncredited)
- King of Chinatown (1939) - Nightclub Girl (uncredited)
- I'm from Missouri (1939) - Hat Check Girl (uncredited)
- Mexicali Rose (1939) - Anita Loredo
- Hotel Imperial (1939) - Nurse (uncredited)
- Undercover Doctor (1939) - Nurse (uncredited)
- Law of the Wolf (1939) - Ruth Adams
- The Magnificent Fraud (1939) - Brunette (uncredited)
- Fangs of the Wild (1939) - Carol Dean
- Mutiny on the Blackhawk (1939) - (uncredited)
- Honeymoon in Bali (1939) - Girl Having Her Fortune Told (uncredited)
- Eternally Yours (1939) - Girl at Shower (uncredited)
- Drums of Fu Manchu (1940, Serial) - Mary Randolph
- Millionaire Playboy (1940) - Resort Girl (uncredited)
- The Return of Wild Bill (1940) - Kate Kilgore
- The Durango Kid (1940) - Nancy Winslow
- The Tulsa Kid (1940) - Mary Wallace
- The Range Busters (1940) - Carol Thorp
- Blondie Plays Cupid (1940) - Millie
- Misbehaving Husbands (1940) - Jane Forbes
- The Kid's Last Ride (1941) - Sally Rowell
- Across the Sierras (1941) - Anne Woodworth
- Arizona Bound (1941) - Ruth Masters
- No Greater Sin (1941) - Sandra James
- Road Agent (1941) - Teresa (uncredited)
- The Lone Star Vigilantes (1942) - Marcia Banning
- Captain Midnight (1942, Serial) - Fury Shark
- Lawless Plainsmen (1942) - Baltimore Bonnie Dixon
- The Corpse Vanishes (1942) - Patricia Hunter
- Inside the Law (1942) - Dora Mason
- Down Texas Way (1942) - Mary Hopkins
- Thundering Hoofs (1942) - Nancy Kellogg
- Bad Men of the Hills (1942) - Laurie Bishop
- Shoot to Kill (1947) - Marian Langdon
- Bells of San Angelo (1947) - Lodge Clerk (uncredited)
- Arthur Takes Over (1948) - Newspaper Woman
- Superman (1948, Serial) - Lara (uncredited)
- Mighty Joe Young (1949) - Nightclub Patron (uncredited)
- Girls in Prison (1956) - Cellblock Guard
- The She-Creature (1956) - Party Guest (final film role)

== Sources ==
- The Helena Independent, Harrison In Hollywood, December 23, 1938, Page 11.
- Ironwood, Michigan Daily Globe, In Hollywood, December 8, 1936, Page 6.
- Mansfield, Ohio News Journal, Theaters, June 29, 1942, Page 13.
- Wisconsin Rapids Daily Tribune, At The Theaters, March 3, 1938, Page 13.
