= Where the West Begins (1938 film) =

1938 film

- Directed by: J.P. McGowan
- Written by: Stanley Roberts (original story and screenplay); Gennaro Rea (screenplay)
- Produced by: Maurice Conn (supervising producer)
- Starring: See below
- Cinematography: Jack Greenhalgh
- Edited by: Carl Pierson; Richard G. Wray
- Production company: Conn Pictures Corporation
- Distributed by: Monogram Pictures
- Release date: 1938
- Running time: 54 minutes
- Country: United States
- Language: English

Where the West Begins is a 1938 American Western film directed by J.P. McGowan in his final feature film as a director.

== Plot summary ==
After being told by his ranch boss Lynn that she plans to sell her ranch to finance a move east, Jack is framed for cattle rustling by Barnes, the man set to buy the ranch. With the help of his pal Buzz, Jack escapes the noose and the two set out to clear Jack's name. In addition, Jack is suspicious of the reason why Barnes wants to own Lynn's ranch in the first place.

== Cast ==
- Addison Randall as Jack Manning
- Fuzzy Knight as Buzz, Jack's Sidekick
- Luana Walters as Lynne Reed
- Arthur Housman as Beano, Jack's Cellmate
- Budd Buster as Sheriff Judson
- Kit Guard as Henchman Smiley
- Richard Alexander as Barnes
- Ralph Peters as Hawkins
- Joe Garcia as Henchman Miller
- Six-Bar-B Cowboys as Saloon musicians

== Soundtrack ==
- Fuzzy Knight with the Ray Whitley Band - "That's My Idea of Fun" (Written by Connie Lee)
- Addison Randall (as Jack Randall) - "Born to the Range" (Written by Johnny Lange and Fred Stryker)
- Addison Randall (as Jack Randall), with the Ray Whitley Band - "Sleep Little Cowboy" (Written by Connie Lee)
- Addison Randall (as Jack Randall), with the Ray Whitley Band - "Down the Trail to Dreams" (Written by Johnny Lange and Fred Stryker)
- Sung by Addison Randall (as Jack Randall), with the Ray Whitley Band - "I'm in Prairie Heaven" (Written by Connie Lee)
