= The Singing Buckaroo =

- Theatrical release poster
- Directed by: Tom Gibson
- Screenplay by: Tom Gibson
- Produced by: Jed Buell; George H. Callaghan
- Starring: Fred Scott; Victoria Vinton; William Faversham; Cliff Nazarro; Howard Hill; Charles Kaley
- Cinematography: Robert Doran
- Edited by: Arthur A. Brooks
- Production company: Spectrum Pictures
- Distributed by: Spectrum Pictures
- Release date: January 15, 1937
- Running time: 56 minutes
- Country: United States
- Language: English

The Singing Buckaroo is a 1937 American Western film written and directed by Tom Gibson. The film stars Fred Scott, Victoria Vinton, William Faversham, Cliff Nazarro, Howard Hill and Charles Kaley. The film was released on January 15, 1937, by Spectrum Pictures.

== Cast ==
- Fred Scott as Grant Gordon
- Victoria Vinton as Barbara Evans
- William Faversham as Dad Evans
- Cliff Nazarro as Gabby
- Howard Hill as Maneeto
- Charles Kaley as Sam Gifford
- Roger Williams as Red
- Dick Curtis as Odie
- Ed Cassidy as Fake Deputy
- Rosa Caprino as Wotonna
