= Rough Riding Ranger =

1935 film by Elmer Clifton

- Directed by: Elmer Clifton
- Written by: Elmer Clifton; George M. Merrick
- Produced by: George M. Merrick (supervising producer); Louis Weiss (producer)
- Starring: See below
- Cinematography: Edward Linden
- Edited by: Carl Himm
- Distributed by: Superior Talking Pictures(US); Equity British Films(UK)
- Release date: 1935
- Running time: 56 minutes
- Country: United States
- Language: English

Rough Riding Ranger is a 1935 American Western film directed by Elmer Clifton.

== Cast ==
- Rex Lease as Ranger Corporal Daniels / Tombstone Kid
- Bobby Nelson as Bobby Francis
- Janet Chandler as Dorothy White
- Yakima Canutt as Henchman Draw
- Mabel Strickland as Mrs. Francis
- Sunday as Mrs. Francis' Horse
- David Horsley as Henchman Slim
- George Chesebro as Henchman Bald
- Robert D. Walker as Ram Hansen
- Carl Mathews as Cinch Clemmons
- Artie Ortego as Henchman Duce
- William Desmond as Major Wright
- Allen Greer as Rurales Lieutenant Ridriguez
