= Adventures of Texas Jack =

1934 American western film

- Directed by: Victor Adamson
- Written by: Victor Adamson; Bennett Cohen
- Produced by: Victor Adamson
- Starring: Hal Taliaferro; Jay Wilsey; Victoria Vinton
- Cinematography: Bert Longenecker
- Production company: Security Pictures
- Distributed by: Security Pictures
- Release date: March 3, 1934
- Running time: 54 minutes
- Country: United States
- Language: English

Adventures of Texas Jack is a 1934 American western film directed by Victor Adamson and starring Hal Taliaferro, Jay Wilsey, and Victoria Vinton. It was produced as a second feature by the Poverty Row company Security Pictures.

== Cast ==
- Hal Taliaferro as Texas Jack
- Victor Adamson as Blister Sanderson
- Jay Wilsey as Bill Mayberry
- Victoria Vinton as Lucy
- Duke R. Lee as Colonel Bodie / Steve Parsons
- Bartlett A. Carre as Sheriff
- Jack Evans as Hank

== Bibliography ==
- Pitts, Michael R. Poverty Row Studios, 1929–1940: An Illustrated History of 55 Independent Film Companies, with a Filmography for Each. McFarland & Company, 2005.
