= The Rangers' Round-Up =

- Theatrical release poster
- Directed by: Sam Newfield
- Screenplay by: George H. Plympton
- Produced by: Jed Buell
- Starring: Fred Scott; Al St. John; Christine McIntyre; Earle Hodgins; Steve Ryan; Karl Hackett
- Cinematography: William Hyer
- Edited by: Robert Jahns
- Production company: Stan Laurel Productions
- Distributed by: Spectrum Pictures
- Release date: February 9, 1938
- Running time: 55 minutes
- Country: United States
- Language: English

The Rangers' Round-Up is a 1938 American Western film directed by Sam Newfield and written by George H. Plympton. The film stars Fred Scott, Al St. John, Christine McIntyre, Earle Hodgins, Steve Ryan and Karl Hackett. The film was released on February 9, 1938, by Spectrum Pictures.

== Cast ==
- Fred Scott as Tex Duncan
- Al St. John as Fuzzy
- Christine McIntyre as Mary
- Earle Hodgins as Doc Aikman
- Steve Ryan as Bull Bailey
- Karl Hackett as Hank
- Robert Owen as Al
- Sydney Chatton as Jim
- Carl Mathews as Dirk
- Richard Cramer as Burton
- Jimmy Aubrey as The Drunk
- Lew Porter as Piano Player
- Cactus Mack as Guitar Player
