= Melody of the Plains =

- Theatrical release poster
- Directed by: Sam Newfield
- Screenplay by: Bennett Cohen
- Produced by: Jed Buell
- Starring: Fred Scott; Louise Small; Al St. John; David Sharpe; Lafe McKee; Bud Jamison
- Cinematography: Robert E. Cline
- Edited by: Arthur A. Brooks; William Hess
- Production company: Callaghan-Buell Productions
- Distributed by: Spectrum Pictures
- Release date: April 2, 1937
- Running time: 55 minutes
- Country: United States
- Language: English

Melody of the Plains is a 1937 American Western film directed by Sam Newfield and written by Bennett Cohen. The film stars Fred Scott, Louise Small, Al St. John, David Sharpe, Lafe McKee and Bud Jamison. The film was released on April 2, 1937, by Spectrum Pictures.

The film was a remake of Gun Law (1933).

== Cast ==
- Fred Scott as Steve Condon
- Louise Small as Molly Langley
- Al St. John as Fuzzy
- David Sharpe as Bud Langley
- Lafe McKee as Dad Langley
- Bud Jamison as Camp Cook
- Billy Lenhart as Bill Langley
- Slim Whitaker as Cass
- Hal Price as Gorman
- Lew Meehan as Scar
- Carl Mathews as Jenks
- George Fiske as Henchman
- George Morrell as Cowhand
