= City Girl (1938 film) =

1938 film by Alfred L. Werker

- Directed by: Alfred L. Werker
- Screenplay by: Lester Ziffren; Frances Hyland; Robin Harris
- Story by: Robin Harris; Frances Hyland; Lester Ziffren
- Produced by: Sol M. Wurtzel
- Starring: Ricardo Cortez; Phyllis Brooks; Robert Wilcox; Douglas Fowley; Chick Chandler; Esther Muir
- Cinematography: Harry Jackson
- Edited by: Norman Colbert
- Production company: 20th Century Fox
- Distributed by: 20th Century Fox
- Release date: January 7, 1938
- Running time: 63 minutes
- Country: United States
- Language: English

City Girl is a 1938 American crime film directed by Alfred L. Werker and written by Lester Ziffren, Frances Hyland and Robin Harris. The film stars Ricardo Cortez, Phyllis Brooks, Robert Wilcox, Douglas Fowley, Chick Chandler and Esther Muir. The film was released on January 7, 1938, by 20th Century Fox.

== Plot ==
Bored with her life and with Don, her lawyer boyfriend, waitress Ellen Ward craves excitement. She accepts an invitation from Ritchie and Mike, a couple of petty crooks, and ends up giving them an alibi for a crime. Ritchie rewards her with $100.

Ellen catches the eye racketeer Charles Blake, irking his moll Vivian, who attacks her with a pair of scissors. Ellen shoots her in self-defense. Ellen is badly injured and has her face radically altered by plastic surgery. Don becomes an assistant district attorney and helps an investigation into Blake's activities, with Ellen, no longer recognizable, working undercover. Blake is about to shoot Don when, at the last instant, Ellen steps between them and is killed.

== Cast ==
- Ricardo Cortez as Charles Blake
- Phyllis Brooks as Ellen Ward
- Robert Wilcox as Donald Sanford
- Douglas Fowley as Ritchie
- Chick Chandler as Mike Harrison
- Esther Muir as Flo Nichols
- Adrienne Ames as Vivian Ross
