= Death Valley Gunfighter =

1949 film by R. G. Springsteen

- Theatrical release poster
- Directed by: R. G. Springsteen
- Screenplay by: Robert Creighton Williams
- Produced by: Gordon Kay
- Starring: Allan Lane; Eddy Waller; James Nolan; Gail Davis; William "Bill" Henry; Harry Harvey, Sr. Mauritz Hugo
- Cinematography: Ernest Miller
- Edited by: Arthur Roberts
- Music by: Stanley Wilson
- Production company: Republic Pictures
- Distributed by: Republic Pictures
- Release date: March 29, 1949
- Running time: 60 minutes
- Country: United States
- Language: English

Death Valley Gunfighter is a 1949 American Western film directed by R. G. Springsteen and written by Robert Creighton Williams. The film stars Allan Lane, Eddy Waller, James Nolan, Gail Davis, William "Bill" Henry, Harry Harvey, Sr. and Mauritz Hugo. The film was released on March 29, 1949, by Republic Pictures.

== Plot ==
A wagonload of quicksilver on its way from the Lucky Brothers Mine to Panamint Wells is raided by the Death Valley Gang, the third shipment to be stolen in two months. At the mine the 2 remaining brothers, ailing Les and crotchety Nugget, are about to tell the miners their pay is ready when the bandits arrive. When Les starts to cough he reaches for a handkerchief and is shot and killed. Sheriff Keith Ames, who is courting the brothers' niece Trudy, whose father was also murdered by outlaws, sends for Rocky Lane, who was a friend of Keith's father, to help sort out the trouble.

Nugget arranges for a loan from banker Vinson McKnight, who only agrees when Keith tells him Rocky is on his way, unbeknownst to Nugget, who won't accept help from anyone. McKnight tells Shad, leader of the gang, about the loan and Rocky. Shad tells his lieutenant Tony Richards to send for his brother Snake, who has a grudge against Rocky, to kill Rocky and then impersonate him when he gets to town. He tells Tony to get out of town so that he and Snake are not seen together. Snake ambushes Rocky but Rocky escapes and then kills Snake and finds the letter from Tony.

In town, Rocky gets a job at the mine. He then finds a note from Shad who thinks he is Snake. When the replacement payroll arrives, Nugget sends Rocky ahead to the mine, and takes the payroll in a buckboard with mine worker Sam riding shotgun. Nugget is ambushed but Rocky and Keith intervene. Nugget is knocked out when the horses get loose from the buckboard and drag him along the ground. Rocky tells Sam not to tell Nugget that he and Keith saved him.

Shad tells McKnight that Snake is helping the sheriff and he didn't get the payroll. When he goes to find Tony to tell him get Snake back on their side, McKnight panics and gets ready to steal the bank's money and run away. He is interrupted by Shad and Tony who are about to go to the mine to stop the quicksilver from bring used to pay off the loan. Rocky arrives in town to see Nugget and Tony recognizes him. Rocky's plan, though he tells Trudy it is Nugget's, is to send the quicksilver across the desert and for Keith to drive a decoy wagon along the road. The next morning, Keith arrives and is talking to Trudy when Tony visits and tells Keith that Rocky is really his brother Snake and that anything Rocky/Snake does is nothing to do with him. Trudy lets slip that the quicksilver wagons will be going across the desert. When Rocky arrives, Keith disarms him and finds the letter. Rocky then disarms Keith, confirms with him that Tony knows about the quicksilver and races off to find Nugget and the wagons.

He arrives just in time to detour them before they are ambushed. The gang starts to follow them but Keith and a posse arrive. Keith shows Nugget the letter and asks him if he saw any outlaws. Nugget is convinced. He arrives at the bank and tells McKnight he has the quicksilver. McKnight says he can't accept the quicksilver and needs cash. Nugget says he has a buyer arriving the next day and wants to store the quicksilver in the bank. Shad, who is watching through a door, indicates to McKnight to accept. Shad's plan is to steal the quicksilver and blame Rocky, whom he intends to break out of jail. The gang surprises Keith in the jail, pistol-whip him and tie him up. They take Rocky out of town to a deserted homestead. When they get there Rocky escapes, leaving two of the gang dead, and rides back to town and frees Keith.

Rocky tells Keith the whole story about him and snake but Keith is not convinced until Rocky tells him details about his father only someone who knew him would know. Rocky goes to fetch Nugget and tells Keith to fetch Tony. They hide in the vault and when Shad forces McKnight to open it they leap out but Shad escapes. After a shootout Rocky captures Shad.

== Cast ==
- Allan Lane as Rocky Lane
- Black Jack as Rocky's Horse
- Eddy Waller as Nugget Clark
- James Nolan as Shad
- Gail Davis as Trudy Clark
- William "Bill" Henry as Sheriff Keith Ames
- Harry Harvey, Sr. as Banker Vinson McKnight
- Mauritz Hugo as Henchman Tony Richards
- George Chesebro as Wagon Driver Sam
- Forrest Taylor as Lester Clark
- George Lloyd as George
- Lane Bradford as Snake Richards
