= I'll Name the Murderer =

- Directed by: Raymond K. Johnson
- Written by: Phil Dunham; Edwin K. O'Brien
- Produced by: C.C. Burr
- Starring: Ralph Forbes; Marion Shilling; Malcolm McGregor
- Cinematography: James Diamond
- Edited by: Charles Henkel Jr.
- Music by: Gene Johnston
- Production company: C.C. Burr Productions
- Distributed by: Puritan Pictures
- Release date: January 27, 1936
- Running time: 66 minutes
- Country: United States
- Language: English

I'll Name the Murderer is a 1936 American crime film produced by C.C. Burr for Puritan Pictures, directed by Raymond K. Johnson and starring Ralph Forbes, Marion Shilling and Malcolm McGregor. The story and screenplay were written by Phil Dunham with special dialogue by Edwin K. O'Brien, and the film was released January 27, 1936. This was Schilling's last film.

== Plot ==
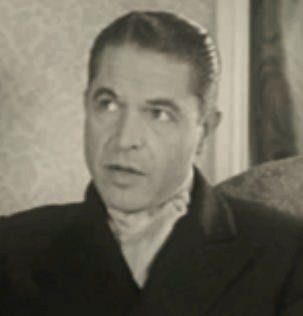
Malcolm McGregor in I'll Name the Murderer

It is the opening night of Luigi’s (Harry Semels) nightclub, gossip columnist Tommy Tilton (Ralph Forbes) is at the nightclub with his photographer, Smitty (Marion Schilling). Tilton runs into his college friend Ted Benson (Malcom McGregor) who is engaged to Vi Van Ostrum (Charlotte Barr-Smith).

Behind the scenes one of the dancers, Valerie Delroy, and the nightclub’s featured singer, Nadia Renee, have an argument which results in Luigi firing Valerie and her dance partner Walton (Gayne Kinsey).

Benson is being blackmailed by Nadia for love letters that he had written her before his engagement to Vi. Tilton agrees to talk Nadia into relinquishing the letters, which she agrees to, but after seeing Benson she changes her mind. Benson is angry at the double cross and picks up a stiletto and tries to attack her just as she turns out the light. Meanwhile, Luigi rehires Valerie and Walton.

Tilton goes to Nadia’s dressing in an effort to find Benson, but finds Nadia dead instead. He retrieves the letters, locks her door and calls the police. After the police arrive, the cook for the nightclub states that he saw a well dressed man leaving the back way.

After questioning everyone involved, Police Captain Flynn (John Cowell) wants Benson brought in for questioning. Tilton is certain Benson is not the guilty party and promises to discover who the murderer is using his newspaper column. Later, Benson turns up at Tilton’s apartment.

Valerie reads Tilton’s column the next day and arranges a meeting with Tilton, but is murdered before she has a chance to talk to him. Tilton visits Vi Van Ostrum and her father, Hugo Van Ostrum (William Bailey). Tilton shows him a receipt for a $15,000 diamond bracelet that he found in Nadia’s dressing room, indicating Van Ostrum has his own motive.

Now that Valerie is dead, Tilton talks Benson into turning himself in for his own safety, which he does. Tilton discovers that Nadia used to work for a nightclub in Chicago called Rossi, and that Luigi, then known as Rossi, used to own that nightclub. It also comes to light that Nadia has blackmailed before. Luigi is ruled out as the murderer however, as he has an airtight alibi. Meanwhile, Tilton promises to name the murderer the next day, which makes him a target that flushes out the murderer.

== Cast ==
- Ralph Forbes as Tommy Tilton
- Marion Shilling as 'Smitty', newspaper photographer
- Malcolm McGregor as Ted Benson
- James Guilfoyle as Lou Baron, Private Investigator
- John Cowell as Police Captain 'Pop' Flynn
- William Bailey as William Hugo Van Ostrum, Vi's father
- Agnes Anderson as Nadia Renee, aka Marina Farina
- Claire Rochelle as Valerie Delroy, aka Maragert O'Brien
- Gayne Kinsey as Walton, Valerie's Dance Partner
- Harry Semels as Luigi, Club Owner
- Al Klein as Club Waiter
