= Moonlight on the Range =

- Theatrical release poster
- Directed by: Sam Newfield
- Screenplay by: Fred Myton
- Story by: Whitney Williams
- Produced by: Jed Buell
- Starring: Fred Scott; Al St. John; Lois January; Dick Curtis; Frank LaRue; Jimmy Aubrey
- Cinematography: Robert E. Cline
- Edited by: Arthur A. Brooks; William Hess
- Production company: Spectrum Pictures
- Distributed by: Spectrum Pictures
- Release date: October 6, 1937
- Running time: 59 minutes
- Country: United States
- Language: English

Moonlight on the Range is a 1937 American Western film directed by Sam Newfield and written by Fred Myton. The film stars Fred Scott, Al St. John, Lois January, Dick Curtis, Frank LaRue and Jimmy Aubrey. The film was released on October 6, 1937, by Spectrum Pictures.

== Plot ==
Jeff Peters and Tom Killer Dane are look-alike half brothers, Tom decides to kill one of Jeff's friends and then make a raid while impersonating Jeff which leads to Jeff's arrest.

== Cast ==
- Fred Scott as Jeff Peters / Tom Killer Dane
- Al St. John as Fuzzy Jones
- Lois January as Wanda Brooks
- Dick Curtis as Hank
- Frank LaRue as Jedd Brooks
- Jimmy Aubrey as Tex
- Oscar Gahan as Deputy
- George Morrell as John
- Carl Mathews as Guard
- Wade Walker as Musician
- William McCall as Dave Cassidy
- Shorty Miller as Musician
- Jack Evans as Henchman
- Rudy Sooter as Musician
