= North of Nome (1925 film) =

1925 film

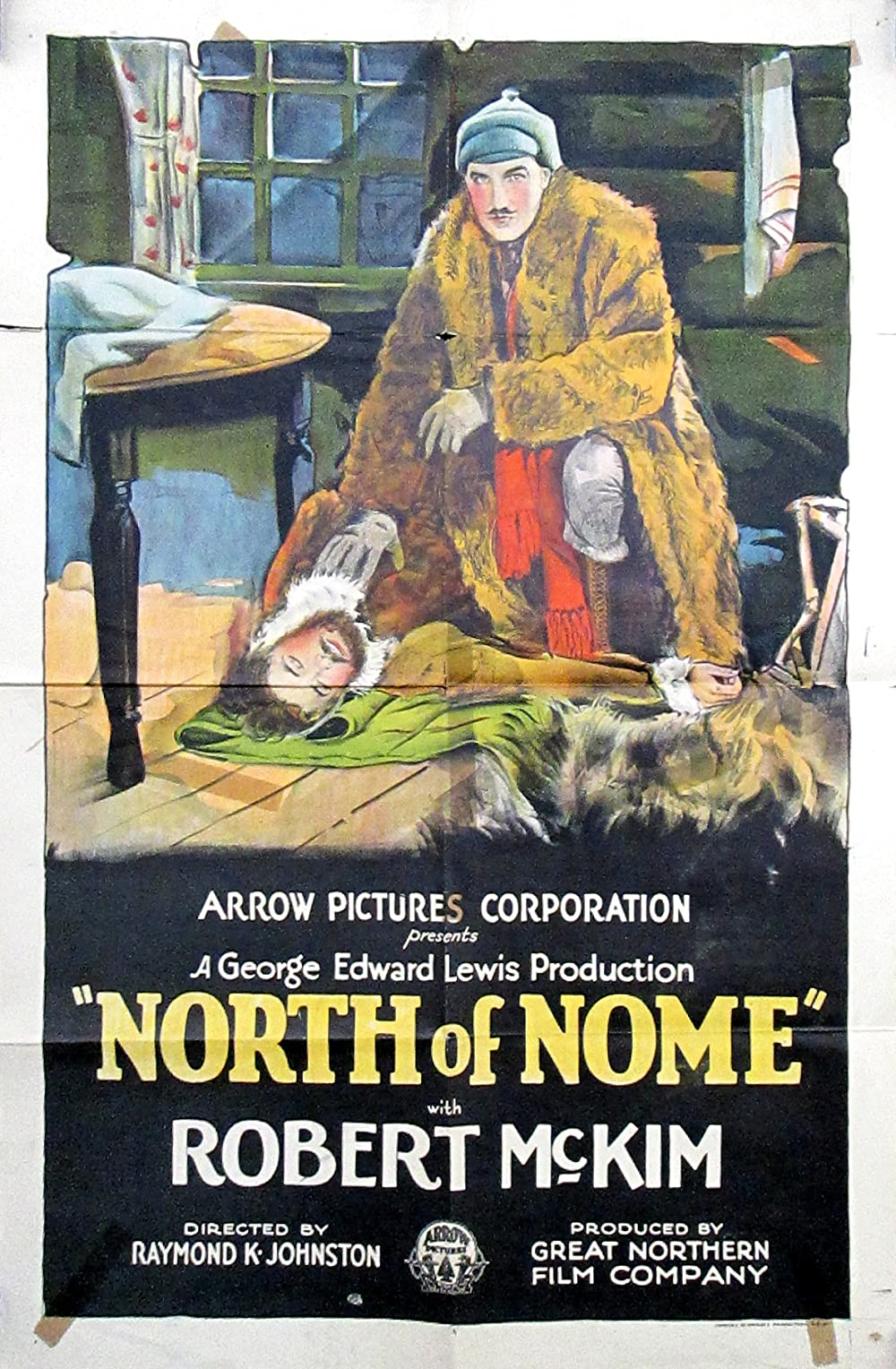
- Directed by: Raymond K. Johnson
- Written by: Harvey Gates
- Produced by: George Edward Lewis
- Starring: Robert McKim; Gladys Johnston; Robert N. Bradbury
- Production company: Great Northern Film Company
- Distributed by: Arrow Film Corporation
- Release date: August 30, 1925
- Country: United States
- Languages: Silent; English intertitles

North of Nome is a 1925 American silent action film directed by Raymond K. Johnson and starring Robert McKim, Gladys Johnston, and Robert N. Bradbury.

== Cast ==
- Robert McKim as Henri Cocteau
- Gladys Johnston as Zelma Killaly
- Robert N. Bradbury as Bruce McLaren
- Howard Webster as Quig Lanigan
- William Dills as Tate Killaly

== Bibliography ==
- Jay Robert Nash, Robert Connelly & Stanley Ralph Ross. Motion Picture Guide Silent Film 1910-1936. Cinebooks, 1988.
