= Raymond K. Johnson =

American film director

- Born: November 24, 1901; Leeds Township, North Dakota, United States
- Died: March 23, 1999 (aged 97); Thousand Palms, California, United States
- Occupation: Director
- Years active: 1925–1940 (directing)

Raymond K. Johnson (1901–1999) was an American cinematographer and film director. He directed more than twenty films, mainly low budget westerns, for Poverty Row studios such as Monogram Pictures.

After service in World War II Johnson joined camera unit at MGM's Hollywood studio, which he eventually came to head the department.

== Filmography ==
- North of Nome (1925)
- All Faces West (1929)
- Kentucky Blue Streak (1935)
- Skybound (1935)
- Suicide Squad (1935)
- The Reckless Way (1936)
- I'll Name the Murderer (1936)
- Special Agent K-7 (1937)
- Daughter of the Tong (1939)
- Code of the Fearless (1939)
- Fangs of the Wild (1939)
- Two Gun Troubador (1939)
- In Old Montana (1939)
- Law of the Wolf (1939)
- Ridin' the Trail (1940)
- Covered Wagon Trails (1940)
- Pinto Canyon (1940)
- Land of the Six Guns (1940)
- The Kid from Santa Fe (1940)
- Riders from Nowhere (1940)
- Wild Horse Range (1940)
- The Cheyenne Kid (1940)

== Bibliography ==
- Pitts, Michael R. Poverty Row Studios, 1929-1940. McFarland & Company, 2005.
