= The Roaming Cowboy =

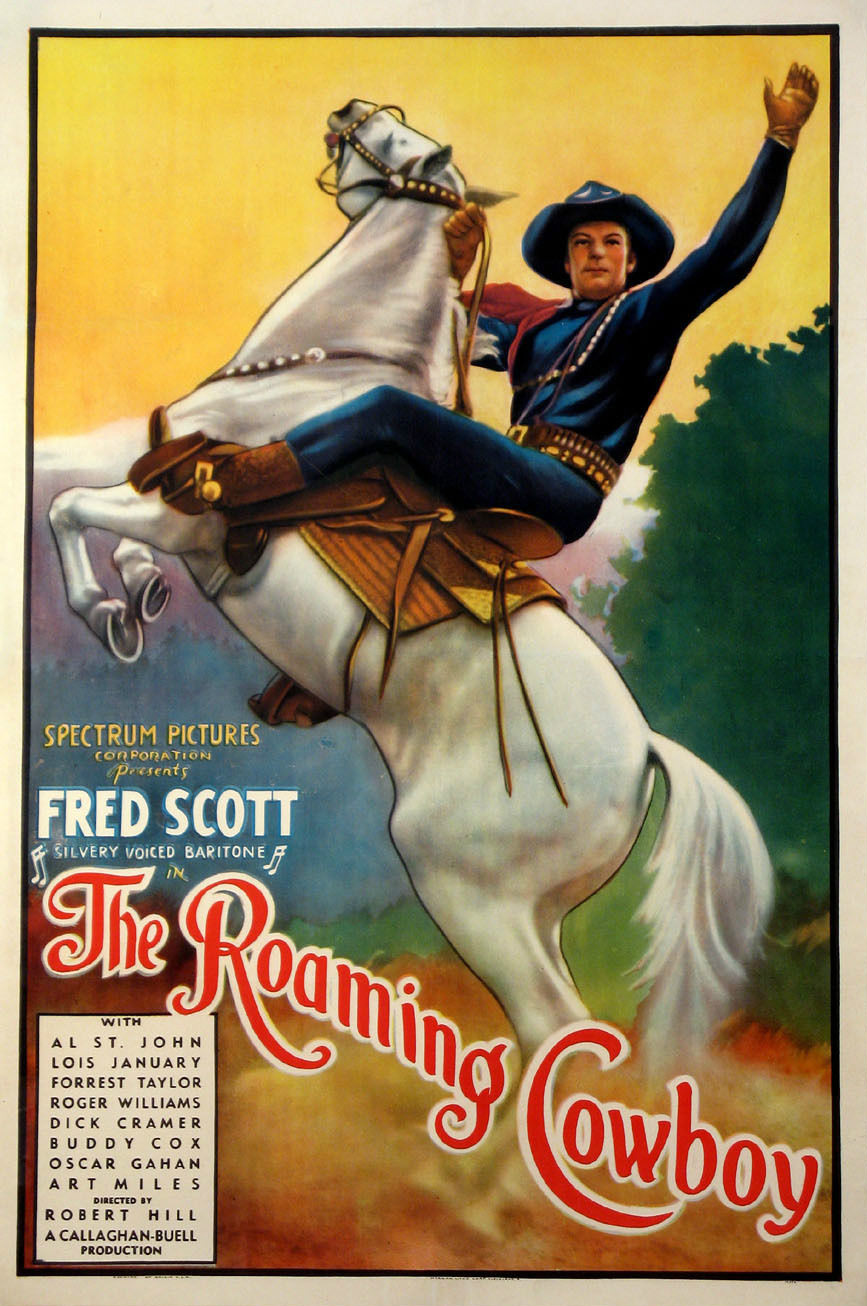
- Theatrical release poster
- Directed by: Robert F. Hill
- Screenplay by: Fred Myton
- Produced by: Jed Buell
- Starring: Fred Scott; Al St. John; Lois January; Forrest Taylor; Roger Williams; Richard Cramer; Buddy Cox; Art Miles
- Cinematography: William Hyer
- Edited by: Arthur A. Brooks; William Hess
- Production company: Spectrum Pictures
- Distributed by: Spectrum Pictures
- Release date: January 4, 1937
- Running time: 56 minutes
- Country: United States
- Language: English

The Roaming Cowboy is a 1937 American Western film directed by Robert F. Hill and written by Fred Myton. The film stars Fred Scott, Al St. John, Lois January, Forrest Taylor, Roger Williams, Richard Cramer, Buddy Cox and Art Miles. The film was released on January 4, 1937, by Spectrum Pictures.

This was the first film to feature Al St. John as "Fuzzy" Jones, a cowboy comedy relief character who went on to appear in dozens of films, including the Producers Releasing Corporation's "Billy the Kid" series from 1940 to 1946, and their "Lone Rider" series from 1941 to 1943.

== Cast ==
- Fred Scott as Cal Brent
- Al St. John as Fuzzy Jones
- Lois January as Jeannie Morgan
- Forrest Taylor as Evans
- Roger Williams as Walton
- Richard Cramer as Dan Morgan
- Buddy Cox as Buddy Barry
- Art Miles aa Blackie
- George Morrell aa Dad Barry
- George Chesebro as Water Poisoner Henchman
- Carl Mathews as Cowhand
