= Rodeo Rhythm =

- Theatrical release poster
- Directed by: Fred C. Newmeyer
- Screenplay by: Gene Tuttle; Eugene Allen
- Story by: Leo J. McCarthy
- Produced by: Leo J. McCarthy
- Starring: Fred Scott; Pat Dunn; Loie Bridge; Patricia Redpath; Jack Cooper; Gloria Morris
- Cinematography: Edward A. Kull
- Edited by: George Halligan
- Production companies: Del Cal Theatres, Inc.
- Distributed by: Producers Releasing Corporation
- Release date: March 13, 1942
- Running time: 72 minutes
- Country: United States
- Language: English

Rodeo Rhythm is a 1942 American Western film directed by Fred C. Newmeyer and written by Gene Tuttle and Eugene Allen. The film stars Fred Scott, Pat Dunn, Loie Bridge, Patricia Redpath, Jack Cooper and Gloria Morris. The film was released on March 13, 1942, by Producers Releasing Corporation.

== Cast ==
- Fred Scott as Buck Knapp
- Pat Dunn as Jim Corey
- Loie Bridge as Aunt Tillie Knapp
- Patricia Redpath as Ellen Knapp
- Jack Cooper as Joe Stegge
- Gloria Morris as Gloria
- H. 'Doc' Hartley as Sheriff Bates
- Donna Jean Meinke as Juanita
- Vernon Brown as Slow Burn
- Landon Laird as Lawyer
- John Frank as Grandpa Twitchell
- Roy Knapp as Roy Knapp
