= Law of the Wolf =

1939 film

- Theatrical release poster
- Directed by: Raymond K. Johnson
- Written by: Carl Krusada
- Produced by: Bernard B. Ray; Harry S. Webb
- Starring: Rin Tin Tin III; Dennis Moore; Luana Walters
- Cinematography: Edward A. Kull
- Edited by: Frederick Bain
- Music by: Johnny Lange; Lew Porter
- Production company: Metropolitan Pictures
- Distributed by: Metropolitan Pictures
- Release date: June 16, 1939
- Running time: 55 minutes
- Country: United States
- Language: English

Law of the Wolf is a 1939 American Western film directed by Raymond K. Johnson and featuring Rin Tin Tin III, Dennis Moore and Luana Walters. The film was reissued in 1941 with the alternative title Law of the Wild.

It is not to be confused with The Law of the Wild, a 1934 serial starring Rin Tin Tin Jr.

== Plot ==
After being falsely accused of his brother Harry's murder Carl Pearson escapes from prison with the aid of another prisoner Duke Williams. Meanwhile, wealthy aircraft manufacturer Roger Morgan makes plans to adopt Harry's son Bobby who is currently in the care of Ruth Adams, who is also Carl's fiancée. With his father dead young Bobby is the legal owner of valuable aircraft plans that Morgan wants to acquire. Carl's son is Johnny who is the owner of Rinty a prize tracking dog. The Police borrow Rinty in order to try to track Carl and Duke; but Rinty is less than cooperative in this effort. After a car accident leaves Ruth temporarily incapacitated, young Bobby wanders off. A canoe rescue and an encounter with a wild cougar follow. Arriving at the Pearson's cabin Carl recovers the plans, but Duke steals them in order to sell them. Eventually everyone else ends up at the cabin and the real killer is revealed. The killer tries to escape followed by Carl and Rinty in a climactic chase.

== Cast ==
- Dennis Moore as Carl Pearson
- Luana Walters as Ruth Adams
- George Chesebro as Duke Williams
- Steve Clark as John Andrews
- Jack Ingram as Roger Morgan
- Robert Frazer as Lt. Franklin
- Jimmy Aubrey as Uncle Jim
- Martin Spellman as Johnny
- Robert Gordon as Bobby [Pearson]
- Rin Tin Tin III as Rinty

== Bibliography ==
- Pitts, Michael R. Western Film Series of the Sound Era. McFarland, 2009.
