= Lester Ziffren =

American journalist, screenwriter and diplomat

Lester Ziffren (April 30, 1906 – November 12, 2007) was an American reporter and Hollywood screenwriter.

Born in Rock Island, Illinois, Ziffren became a reporter for United Press. He was among the first to report on the Spanish Civil War in 1936. He met Ernest Hemingway in Spain, and the two became good friends. Ziffren used a cipher to evade censors. He left Spain just ahead of Francisco Franco's troops.

He then went to Hollywood where he got a job writing movie screenplays. Ziffren married Edythe L. Wurtzel in 1937; her uncle, Sol M. Wurtzel, was a major Hollywood executive. Ziffren wrote nine scripts during his stint in Hollywood including five films in the Charlie Chan series for 20th Century Fox.

Ziffren worked at the U.S. Embassy in Chile during World War II.

Ziffren died in New York City of congestive heart disease with his daughter Didi by his side.

== Selected filmography ==
- City Girl (1938)
- The Man Who Wouldn't Talk (1940)

== Sources ==
- Lester Ziffren 1906-2007, While working for United Press in Madrid in 1936, he broke the story on the outbreak of The Spanish Civil War. He Then Took Up a Hollywood Career, obituary in the 24-25 Nov. 2007 Wall Street Journal, pg. A8
