= Jed Buell =

American film producer

Jed Buell (May 21, 1897 - September 29, 1961) was an American film producer, director, and screenwriter who specialized in low-budget B pictures in a variety of subjects including singing cowboy films featuring midgets and black actors.

== Career ==
Buell, born in Denver, Colorado to Dora Phelps and William J. Buell, was educated at the Corona School and North Denver High School. He began his film career as treasurer of the Denver Orpheum Theatre and Denham Theatre as well as the business manager of Denver's Elitch Theatre. In 1928 he became general manager of California Universal Chair Theaters. He joined Mack Sennett as a publicist and in 1930 was made director of all publicity at the Mack Sennett Studios in Hollywood.

Buell made his first venture into singing-cowboy films by bringing them into the race film genre by producing Harlem on the Prairie (1937) with singer Herb Jeffries who had seen The Terror of Tiny Town. and approached Buell to feature him as a black singing cowboy.

The next year, Buell utilized his own production company for one of the strangest westerns of all time, The Terror of Tiny Town with an all-midget cast, which would also feature songs. Buell recruited a troop of actors under four feet tall formerly called Leo Singer that Buell renamed the Jed Buell Midgets. The film was picked up for release by Columbia Pictures.

Buell and Rev. James Kempe Friedrich formed Cathedral Films and Church-Craft Pictures to make a series of Christian films including The Great Commandment (1939).

During this time Buell rejoined Sam Newfield with whom he'd worked on his Fred Scott Westerns by producing several non-Western films for Producers Releasing Corporation such as Misbehaving Husbands (1940), Emergency Landing, (1941) and Broadway Big Shot (1940) with William Beaudine.

In March 1940 Buell created Dixie National Pictures, Inc. and Dixie National Film Exchange Inc to distribute the films together with Ted Toddy and Rev. James Friedrich. Dixie National had offices in six large American cities with the idea to make and distribute all-black-cast films to the estimated 400 Negro cinemas and film venues in the US. Buell made several comedies with director William Beaudine and Mantan Moreland where Buell was credited with directing one and writing another.

== Television ==
After the war, Buell went into television by producing the soap opera The Adventures of Kitty Gordon, but the show ended when he disagreed with network executives.

== Personal life ==
Buell married journalist Helen Gurley in 1934. She was no relation to Helen Gurley Brown; she served as story editor on several of Buell's films. Their son, Jed Buell Jr., was born in 1939.

== Filmography ==
As producer

- Romance Rides the Range (1936)
- Harlem on the Prairie (1937)
- Melody of the Plains (1937)
- Moonlight on the Range (1937)
- The Fighting Deputy (1937)
- The Roaming Cowboy (1937)
- The Singing Buckaroo (1937)
- Knight of the Plains (1938)
- Songs and Bullets (1938)
- The Rangers' Round-Up (1938)
- The Terror of Tiny Town (1938)
- What Goes Up (1939)
- Four Shall Die (1940)
- Misbehaving Husbands (1940)
- She Done Him Right (1940)
- Emergency Landing (1941)
- Mr. Washington Goes to Town (1941, also served as co-director with William Beaudine)
- Up Jumped the Devil (1941)
- Broadway Big Shot (1942)
- Lady Luck (1942)
- Professor Creeps (1942, also served as writer)
- Mantan Messes Up (1946)

== Death ==
Buell died on September 29, 1961.
