= Songs and Bullets =

- Theatrical release poster
- Directed by: Sam Newfield
- Screenplay by: George H. Plympton; Joseph O'Donnell
- Produced by: Jed Buell
- Starring: Fred Scott; Al St. John; Alyce Ardell; Charles King; Karl Hackett; Frank LaRue; Richard Cramer; Budd Buster
- Cinematography: Mack Stengler
- Edited by: Robert Jahns
- Production company: Stan Laurel Productions
- Distributed by: Spectrum Pictures
- Release date: May 15, 1938
- Running time: 57 minutes
- Country: United States
- Language: English

Songs and Bullets is a 1938 American Western film directed by Sam Newfield and written by George H. Plympton and Joseph O'Donnell. The film stars Fred Scott, Al St. John, Alyce Ardell, Charles King, Karl Hackett, Frank LaRue, Richard Cramer and Budd Buster. The film was released on May 15, 1938, by Spectrum Pictures.

== Plot ==
Melody Smith arrives in town to find his uncle's killer and at the same time Du Mont also arrives in search of her father's murderer, the two have suspicious of Harry Skelton, but he has the Sheriff on his side and manages to arrest Melody.

== Cast ==
- Fred Scott as Melody Smith
- Al St. John as Fuzzy Martin
- Alyce Ardell as Jeanette Du Mont
- Charles King as Sheriff
- Karl Hackett as Harry Skelton
- Frank LaRue as Mr. Morgan
- Richard Cramer as Outlaw Leader
- Budd Buster as Zeke
- Jimmy Aubrey as First Gunman
- Lew Porter as Lew
- James Sheridan as Hired Gunman
