= Suicide Squad (1935 film) =

Film directed by Raymond K. Johnson

- Directed by: Raymond K. Johnson
- Written by: Charles E. Roberts; Ray Nazarro; Homer King Gordon
- Produced by: C.C. Burr
- Starring: Norman Foster; Joyce Compton; Robert Homans
- Cinematography: James Diamond
- Edited by: Arthur A. Brooks
- Music by: Abe Meyer
- Production company: C.C. Burr Productions
- Distributed by: Puritan Pictures
- Release date: December 3, 1935
- Running time: 58 minutes
- Country: United States
- Language: English

Suicide Squad is a 1935 American action film directed by Raymond K. Johnson and starring Norman Foster, Joyce Compton and Robert Homans. It was made as a second feature by the independent outfit Puritan Pictures. The film's sets were designed by the art director Vin Taylor.

== Plot ==
A young firefighter's exploits gain him newspaper attention, but the publicity starts to go to his head.

== Cast ==
- Norman Foster as Larry Parker
- Joyce Compton as Mary O'Connor
- Robert Homans as Capt. Tim O'Connor
- Aggie Herring as Mother O'Connor
- Peter Warren as Mickey O'Connor
- Jack Luden as Ed Drake
- Phil Kramer as Snaps - Photographer

== Bibliography ==
- Pitts, Michael R. Poverty Row Studios, 1929-1940. McFarland & Company, 2005.
