= Knight of the Plains =

- Theatrical release poster
- Directed by: Sam Newfield
- Screenplay by: Fred Myton
- Produced by: Jed Buell
- Starring: Fred Scott; Al St. John; Marion Weldon; John Merton; Richard Cramer; Frank LaRue; Lafe McKee
- Cinematography: Mack Stengler
- Edited by: Robert Jahns
- Production company: Stan Laurel Productions
- Distributed by: Spectrum Pictures
- Release date: May 7, 1938
- Running time: 57 minutes
- Country: United States
- Language: English

Knight of the Plains is a 1938 American Western film directed by Sam Newfield and written by Fred Myton. The film stars Fred Scott, Al St. John, Marion Weldon, John Merton, Richard Cramer, Frank LaRue and Lafe McKee. The film was released on May 7, 1938, by Spectrum Pictures.

== Cast ==
- Fred Scott as Fred Brent
- Al St. John as Fuzzy
- Marion Weldon as Gale Rand
- John Merton as Carson / Pedro de Cordoba
- Richard Cramer as Clem Peterson
- Frank LaRue as J.C. Rand
- Lafe McKee as John Lane
- Emma Tansey as Martha Lane
- Steve Clark as Sheriff Dykes
- Jimmy Aubrey as Henchman
- James Sheridan as Henchman
- Budd Buster as Manuel
