= Misbehaving Husbands =

1940 film by William Beaudine

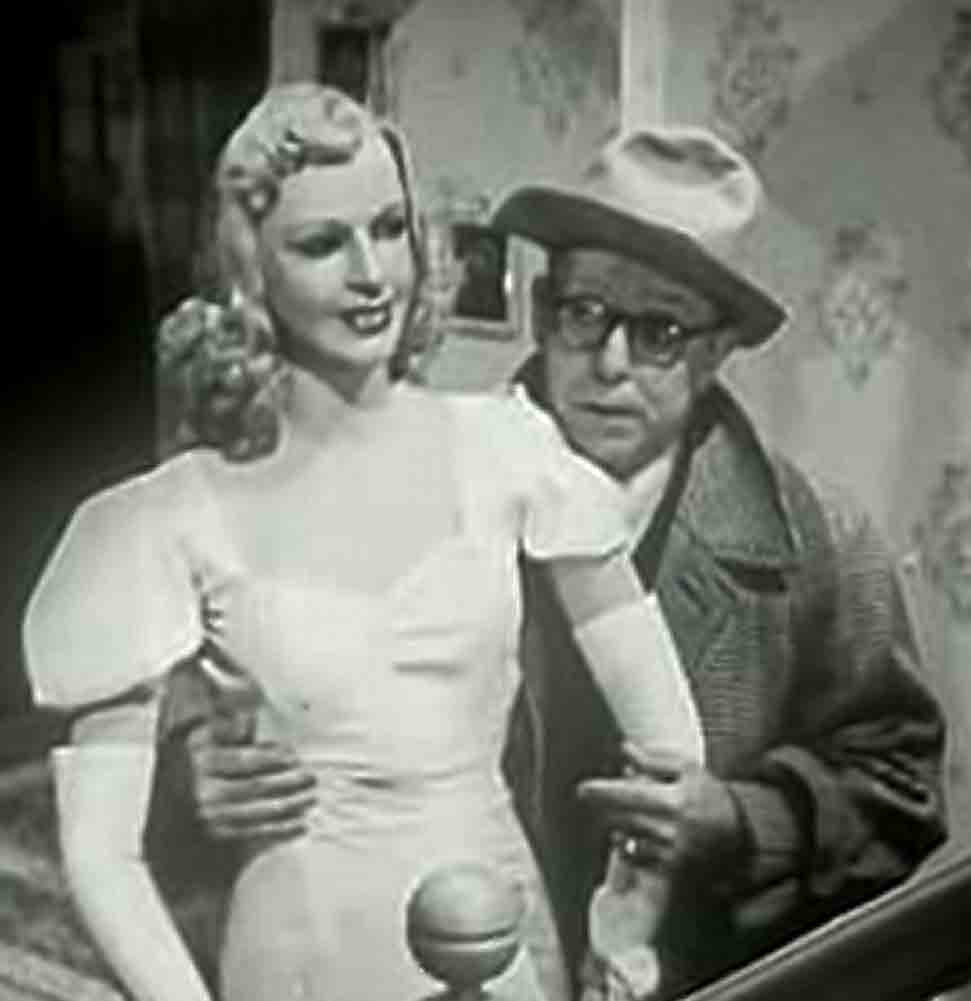
- Henry (Harry Langdon) and "Carole" in Misbehaving Husbands.
- Directed by: William Beaudine
- Written by: Cea Sabin (story); Vernon Smith (screenplay) and Claire Parrish (screenplay)
- Produced by: Jed Buell
- Starring: Harry Langdon; Betty Blythe; Ralph Byrd; Esther Muir
- Cinematography: Arthur Reed
- Edited by: Robert O. Crandall
- Distributed by: Producers Releasing Corporation
- Release date: December 20, 1940
- Running time: 65 minutes
- Country: United States
- Language: English

Misbehaving Husbands is a 1940 American comedy film directed by William Beaudine for Producers Releasing Corporation. The film had the working titles At Your Age and Dummy Husbands. Harry Langdon, Betty Blythe, Esther Muir, and others in the cast had been stars in silent films. It was Gig Young's film debut, under his real name Byron Barr.

== Plot ==
Absent-minded department store owner Henry Butler (Harry Langdon), forgetting his wedding anniversary, ends up working late and missing the surprise party thrown by his wife, Effie (Betty Blythe). He has to have a store mannequin repaired. On the street he is spotted, with the mannequin, by a friend of his wife who thinks Henry is escorting a strange blonde. Other bystanders think it's a murder victim and call the police.

Henry is picked up by the police and kept for interrogation until the wee hours of the morning, but his troubles are just starting. Effie has overheard the gossip spread among her party guests and, seeing Henry come home with the mannequin's blonde hair on his clothes and one of the mannequin's shoes, fears the worst. Her friend, Grace Norman (Esther Muir), and an unscrupulous lawyer, Gilbert Wayne (Gayne Whitman), urged her to file for a divorce. Since neither one will leave the family home, lawyers ask witnesses to prove that the husband and wife are living apart. Due to Henry's alleged violent temper, Effie's lawyer demands that she have a bodyguard: a thug named Gooch (Frank Hagney) who stays at the home.

When Effie decides to stop the divorce, her lawyer stages a scene. His girlfriend Nan (Florence Wright) poses as the blonde Henry was supposedly seeing, and convinces Effie to proceed. It is only then that the live-in witnesses, her niece Jane (Luana Walters), and Henry's friend Bob Grant (Ralph Byrd) notice that the shoe Henry brought back that night is too small for Nan. Jane also notices that Gooch and Nan seem to recognize each other, and tricks Gooch into calling Nan. They overhear her on an extension phone and get the truth out of her.

A tipsy Henry drags the mannequin all over town, only to meet the police, Effie, and her lawyer waiting for him at home.

Misbehaving Husbands (full film)

== Cast ==
- Harry Langdon as Henry Butler
- Betty Blythe as Effie Butler
- Ralph Byrd as Bob Grant
- Esther Muir as Grace Norman
- Gayne Whitman as Gilbert Wayne
- Luana Walters as Jane Forbes
- Gig Young as Floor Walker
- Frank Hagney as Gooch Mulligan
- Fred Kelsey as Sgt. Murphy
- Mary MacLaren as Gossiping Friend
- Gertrude Astor as Gossiping Friend

== Quotes ==
Effie to Jane: "I'm going to get tight!"

Bob to Jane: "You've been reading too many detective stories." (inside joke: Ralph Byrd played detective Dick Tracy, in four movie serials and two feature films, from 1937 to 1947, and on television.)

Henry: "All this fuss over one little shoe!"

== Production and reception ==
Misbehaving Husbands was produced by Hollywood promoter Jed Buell on a very small budget. Buell was friendly with William Beaudine, who had been a top director until an ill-fated business trip to England resulted in depleted finances and fewer opportunities to work. Buell hired Beaudine, and Beaudine worked closely with Langdon in the staging of the comedy sequences. Langdon's silent-screen character had been that of a hesitant, wide-eyed, babyish simpleton who had trouble dealing with adult problems. Beginning in 1938 Langdon had been experimenting with a new "henpecked husband" screen personality, similar to the timid Caspar Milquetoast of the comic strips, and used this characterization in Misbehaving Husbands. The finished film was distributed by PRC, the smallest of the Hollywood studios.

The Langdon-Beaudine collaboration was very successful, and both the star and director received excellent notices. Langdon and Beaudine continued their respective careers in low-budget features, many for Monogram Pictures.
