= The Cheyenne Tornado =

1935 film

- Directed by: William A. O'Connor
- Written by: Oliver Drake
- Produced by: Willis Kent
- Starring: Reb Russell; Victoria Vinton; Roger Williams
- Cinematography: Harvey Gould
- Edited by: S. Roy Luby
- Music by: David Broekman
- Production company: Willis Kent Productions
- Distributed by: Marcy Pictures
- Release date: December 1935
- Running time: 50 minutes
- Country: United States
- Language: English

The Cheyenne Tornado is a 1935 American Western film directed by William A. O'Connor and starring Reb Russell, Victoria Vinton and Roger Williams.

== Cast ==
- Reb Russell as Red - Cheyenne Kid
- Victoria Vinton as Jane Darnell
- Roger Williams as Clem
- Edmund Cobb as Pete Lang
- Tina Menard as Rita Farley
- Winton Perry as Jim Darnell
- Dick Botiller as Filipe
- Ed Porter as James Farley
- Hank Bell as Sheriff
- Lafe McKee as Seth Darnell
- Rebel as The Kid's Horse

== Bibliography ==
- Pitts, Michael R. Poverty Row Studios, 1929-1940. McFarland & Company, 2005.
