= All Faces West =

1929 film

- Directed by: Raymond K. Johnson
- Written by: George W. Pyper; Raymond K. Johnson
- Produced by: Lewis H. Moomaw; W. Ray Johnston
- Starring: Ben Lyon; Marie Prevost; Anders Randolf
- Cinematography: Hobart H. Brownell; King D. Gray
- Edited by: George McGuire
- Music by: James G. Henshel
- Production company: Pioneer Film Corporation
- Distributed by: Syndicate Film Exchange
- Release date: March 2, 1929
- Running time: 71 minutes
- Country: United States
- Languages: English (sound version); English intertitles (silent version)
- Budget: $650,000

All Faces West is a 1929 American Western film directed by Raymond K. Johnson and starring Ben Lyon, Marie Prevost and Anders Randolf. It was shot in late 1928 on location in Utah. It premiered in Salt Lake City as a silent film, but was re-edited in 1931 with added music and sound effects for re-release as a sound fim under the alternative title Call of the Rockies.

== Plot ==
Mormon pioneers settle in Utah in the mid-nineteenth century.

== Cast ==
- Ben Lyon as Mathew
- Marie Prevost as Arleta Vance
- Gladys Johnson as Sylvia
- Anders Randolf as Jim Vance
- Russell Simpson as Gunner Bill
- James Mason as Tony / Kit Carson
- Tex Driscoll as The Stranger

== Production ==
The film began production in early September, 1928 and was filmed under the working title The Exodus. After several weeks spent filming in Salt Lake City, Utah, the company left for Twin Falls, Idaho to shoot on the Snake River. While filming in Salt Lake City, De Vere Childs, the construction manager for Pioneer Film, was struck by the propeller of a wind machine. He underwent surgery and was expected to recover. The Film Daily reported that as of early November, 1928, the film was complete. The budget had been reported by Variety as $250,000.

== Bibliography ==
- D'Arc, James. When Hollywood Came to Town: A History of Movie Making in Utah. Gibbs Smith, 2010.
