= Michael G. Ankerich =

American biographer

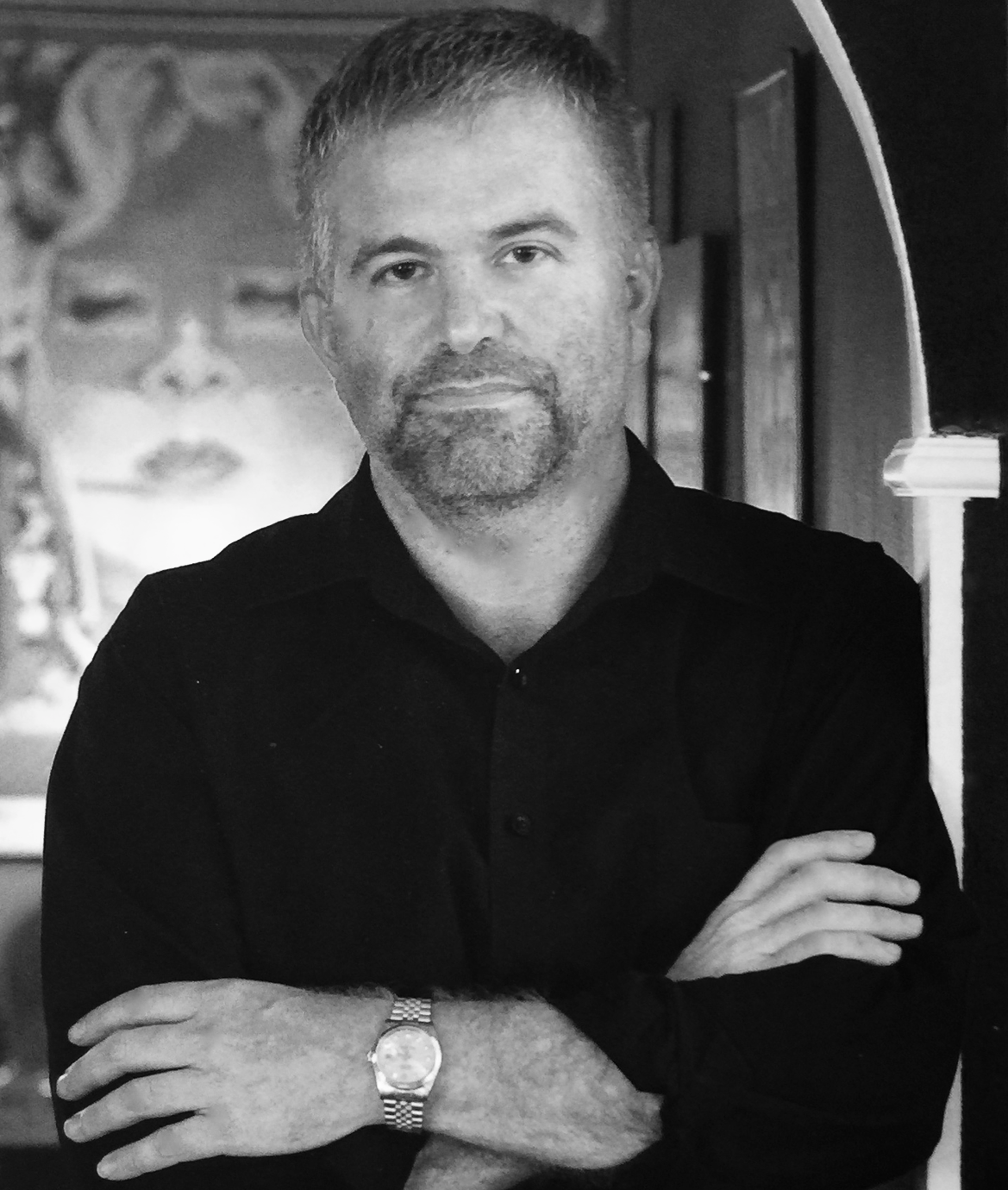
- Born: March 21, 1965 (age 61)
- Occupations: Author; researcher; journalist
- Writing career
- Language: English
- Years active: 30
- Notable work: Dangerous Curves a'top Hollywood Heels Mae Murray: The Girl with the Bee-Stung Lips

Michael G. Ankerich is a biographer whose work focuses on American silent film and early twentieth century actors and actresses. Ankerich's interviews with the last remaining silent film stars were featured in Broken Silence: Conversations With 23 Silent Film Stars (1993) and The Sound of Silence: Conversations with 16 Film and Stage Personalities Who Made the Transition from Silents to Talkies (1998). His biography of silent film actress Mae Murray, Mae Murray: The Girl with the Bee-Stung Lips, was named one of the top 10 must-read film books of 2012.

Dangerous Curves atop Hollywood Heels, Ankerich's book about the tragic lives of 14 silent film actresses, was named by the San Francisco Examiner as one of the top ten silent film books of 2010.

In 2014, Ankerich appeared on Lifetime Movie Network's The Ghost Inside My Child to discuss his research into the life and death of actress Lucille Ricksen. He was guest speaker at the 86th annual Valentino Memorial Service in 2013, which included videos acknowledging the 100th anniversary of Rudolph Valentino’s arrival in America and Valentino's friendship with Mae Murray.

Hairpins and Dead Ends: The Perilous Journeys of 20 Actresses Through Early Hollywood, Ankerich's latest book, was released in 2017.

A former newspaper reporter, Ankerich has written extensively for Classic Images, Films of the Golden Age, and Hollywood Studio Magazine, which featured his exclusive interview with Butterfly McQueen (Prissy) on the 50th anniversary of the release of Gone With The Wind.

== Bibliography ==
- Broken Silence: Conversations with 23 Silent Film Stars (1993)
- The Sound of Silence: Conversations with 16 Film and Stage Personalities Who Made the Transition from Silents to Talkies (1998)
- The Real Joyce Compton: Behind the Dumb Blonde Movie Image, with Joyce Compton (2008)
- Dangerous Curves atop Hollywood Heels: The Lives, Careers, and Misfortunes of 14 Hard-Luck Girls of the Silent Screen (2010)
- Mae Murray: The Girl with the Bee-Stung Lips (2012)

== Sources ==
- Interview with Michael G. Ankerich, Author of Dangerous Curves Atop Hollywood Heels (by Cliff Aliperti Immortal Ephemera)
- The Reel Joyce Compton (by James B. Neibaur The Rogue Cinema)
- An Interview with Michael G. Ankerich (by James Zeruk The Hollywood Sign Girl)
- Living Resources (by Robert C. Sickels H-Film)
- Blogging for a Good Book
- The Movies: 10 Must-Read Books Coming This Fall (by Thomas Gladysz)
