= Romance Rides the Range =

- Theatrical release poster
- Directed by: Harry L. Fraser
- Screenplay by: Tom Gibson
- Produced by: Jed Buell; George H. Callaghan
- Starring: Fred Scott; Cliff Nazarro; Marion Shilling; Buzz Barton; Bob Kortman; Theodore Lorch
- Cinematography: Robert E. Cline
- Edited by: Arthur A. Brooks
- Production company: Spectrum Pictures
- Distributed by: Spectrum Pictures
- Release date: September 1, 1936
- Running time: 59 minutes
- Country: United States
- Language: English

Romance Rides the Range is a 1936 American Western film directed by Harry L. Fraser and written by Tom Gibson. The film stars Fred Scott, Cliff Nazarro, Marion Shilling, Buzz Barton, Bob Kortman and Theodore Lorch. The film was released on September 1, 1936, by Spectrum Pictures.

This film was Fred Scott's first starring role as a singing cowboy.

== Cast ==
- Fred Scott as Barry Glendon
- Cliff Nazarro as 'Shorty'
- Marion Shilling as Carol Marland
- Buzz Barton as Jimmy Marland
- Bob Kortman as Clem Allen
- Theodore Lorch as Jonas Allen
- Frank Yaconelli as Tony
- Jack Evans as Buck
- Phil Dunham as Doctor
- Billy Steuer as Slick
