= The Fighting Deputy =

1937 film

- Directed by: Sam Newfield
- Written by: Bennett Cohen (story); William Lively (adaptation)
- Produced by: Jed Buell (producer); George H. Callaghan (associate producer)
- Starring: See below
- Edited by: William Hess; Arthur A. Brooks
- Distributed by: Spectrum Pictures
- Release date: December 5, 1937
- Running time: 61 minutes
- Country: United States
- Language: English

The Fighting Deputy is a 1937 American western directed by Sam Newfield and produced by Jed Buell for Spectrum Pictures.

== Plot ==
Sheriff Dan Bentley (Frank LaRue) and Deputy Tom Bentley (Fred Scott) are after Scar Adams / Jim Denton (Charles King), the brother of Alice Denton (Phoebe Logan).

Tom Bentley plans to marry Alice Denton, but Sheriff Dan Bentley, Tom's father, is wounded and offers Tom the job as sheriff. Alice makes Tom refuse the job, but when Scar kills his father, Tom puts on the badge and takes off after him.

== Cast ==
- Fred Scott as Deputy Tom Bentley
- Phoebe Logan as Alice Denton
- Al St. John as Deputy Fuzzy
- Marjorie Beebe as Peaches
- Charles King as Scar Adams / Jim Denton
- Frank LaRue as Sheriff Dan Bentley, Tom's Father
- Eddie Holden as Axel
- Lafe McKee as Frank Denton
- Jack C. Smith as Jed - Posse Rider
- Jack Evans as Henchman Shorty
- James Sheridan as Henchman Buck
- White King as White King - Tom's Horse
