= The Grand Parade =

1930 film

- Theatrical release poster
- Directed by: Fred C. Newmeyer
- Written by: Edmund Goulding
- Produced by: Edmund Goulding
- Starring: Helen Twelvetrees; Fred Scott; Richard Carle
- Cinematography: David Abel
- Production company: Pathé Exchange
- Distributed by: Pathé Exchange
- Release date: February 2, 1930
- Running time: 70 minutes
- Country: United States
- Language: English

The Grand Parade is a 1930 American drama film directed by Fred C. Newmeyer and starring Helen Twelvetrees, Fred Scott and Richard Carle. It is now considered to be a lost film.

== Plot ==
The famous singer Kelly, due to his alcoholism, has fallen so low that he has been forced to seek refuge in a modest boarding house where he is cared for by Molly, a maid. Kelly's downfall is attributed to Polly Malone, a comic actress whom he believes he loves. Kelly, in the tavern, gets involved in a brawl and Molly - who always watches his every move, for she is silently in love with him - waits anxiously at the window, full of fear, for the moment to save him from the imminent arrival of the police. Rand, producer and director of the minstrel singing company - who perform in blackface to better enhance their popular melodies - to which Kelly belonged, arrives at the humble house in search of the celebrated tenor. Mistaking him for a policeman, Molly is about to make him leave; but, when he tells her that she is looking for him to persuade him to rejoin the company he manages, she leads him into the room occupied by the singer. After a brief conversation, Rand succeeds in lifting the artist’s spirits, encouraging him to consider returning to his former profession—the very career in which he had once won so many accolades. When left alone with Molly, Kelly sings his favorite song, titled "Polly." The young woman listens, suffering in silence. And when Kelly laments that Polly was responsible for his degradation, the young woman—tearful and deeply moved—persuades him to change the title of the song to "Molly," her own name. Kelly does just that; he returns to the stage and achieves a resounding success.

The actress Polly works in the same city; having heard that Kelly is now singing, she resolves to ensnare him once again in the web of her charms. All the members of the singing troupe are at a bar near the theater, celebrating Kelly's triumph, when Polly appears. Kelly is visibly flustered. He quickly regains his composure, however, and introduces Molly—the newcomer—as his wife. This angers Molly, who storms out of the venue, followed by Kelly. Convinced that Molly will help him redeem himself, he declares his love for her. She consents to become his wife, and the very next day, they get married. Molly joins the singing troupe and performs as the star of "The Grand Parade" at every performance.

Polly crosses paths with Kelly once again in Chicago. Despite the efforts of the woman who is now his wife, the artist remains restless and impatient. In Detroit, a few weeks later, he encounters Polly yet again—and gets drunk. The theater is packed, and one of the troupe's singers is designated to fill in for him. Kelly appears. When Molly implores him—insistently—to return to the straight and narrow and not abandon his job, he rejects her harshly. Rand fires him, and one of the singers dares to insult him crudely. Kelly, his pride deeply wounded, decides to perform his number to prove to everyone that he still has his head on straight. He gets into costume, bursts onto the stage, shoves aside the man who has replaced him, and finishes the song.

Juana, the woman in charge of the cloakroom, brings a package to Molly’s room containing items that hint at the impending motherhood of Kelly’s young wife. Shortly thereafter, Polly enters, bringing a bottle for the man she believes she has won back as a lover. Molly, furious, throws her out of the room. Just then, she hears the laughter of the singers on stage; seized by a fit of hysterical gaiety, she climbs to the rooftop with the intention of ending her life. She looks down at the street below—a deep chasm filled with noise—and hesitates. The maternal instinct prevails within her, and she faints. Juana returns to Molly’s room just as Kelly enters to change his clothes. She then reproaches him for his behavior toward his wife and reveals Molly’s condition. Like a madman, Kelly searches for the young woman everywhere. "Where is Molly?" he shouts in desperation.

Someone tells Kelly that Molly has been seen going up to the roof, and there he finds her, lying flat, face-down on the ground. Embracing her—with a love that now seems true—he asks her why she had not revealed the secret of her impending motherhood. Molly confesses the truth; yet, deeply offended to the very core of her being by his misconduct, she refuses to remain by his side for another moment, for she does not want her child ever to know what kind of father she has given him. They return to the dressing room. Rand announces to Molly that she must go on stage immediately to perform in "The Grand Parade." Kelly will not let her leave, clinging to her knees and pleading for forgiveness. Finally, Molly—whose first impulse had been to separate forever from the man who had lacked the strength to resist the temptations of vice—relents. And, shining with a mother's love, the young woman invites Kelly to pray to God. "I am no one," she tells him, "to forgive you, nor to judge you. It is God alone who must—and can—judge and forgive us all." But now Molly smiles, brimming with happiness, for—possessing faith and trust in divine power and divine justice—she is certain that she will never lose Kelly again.

== Cast ==
- Helen Twelvetrees as Molly
- Fred Scott as Kelly
- Richard Carle as Rand
- Marie Astaire as Polly
- Russ Powell as Calamity Johnson
- Bud Jamison as Honey Sullivan
- Jimmie Adams as Jones
- Lillian Leighton as Madam Stitch
- Spec O'Donnell as Call Boy
- Sammy Blum as Sam
- Tom Malone as Dougherty
- Jimmy Aubrey as The Drunk

== Songs ==
- "Molly" (sung by Fred Scott): Composed by Edmund Goulding and Dan Dougherty.
- "Alone In The Rain" (sung by Fred Scott): Composed by Edmund Goulding and Dan Dougherty.
- "Moanin' For You" (sung by Fred Scott): Composed by Edmund Goulding and Dan Dougherty.

== Bibliography ==
- Kennedy, Matthew. Edmund Goulding's Dark Victory: Hollywood's Genius Bad Boy. Terrace Books, 2004.
