= Lawless Plainsmen =

1942 film by William Berke

- Theatrical release poster
- Directed by: William Berke
- Screenplay by: Luci Ward
- Produced by: Jack Fier
- Starring: Charles Starrett; Russell Hayden; Cliff Edwards; Luana Walters; Ray Bennett; Gwen Kenyon
- Cinematography: Benjamin H. Kline
- Edited by: William Lyon
- Production company: Columbia Pictures
- Distributed by: Columbia Pictures
- Release date: March 17, 1942
- Running time: 59 minutes
- Country: United States
- Language: English

Lawless Plainsmen is a 1942 American Western film directed by William Berke and written by Luci Ward. The film stars Charles Starrett, Russell Hayden, Cliff Edwards, Luana Walters, Ray Bennett and Gwen Kenyon. The film was released on March 17, 1942, by Columbia Pictures.

The copyright to the film Lawless Plainsmen was renewed in 1970.

== Cast ==
- Charles Starrett as Steve Rideen
- Russell Hayden as 'Lucky' Bannon
- Cliff Edwards as Harmony Stubbs
- Luana Walters as Baltimore Bonnie Dixon
- Ray Bennett as Seth McBride
- Gwen Kenyon as Madge Mason
- Frank LaRue as Bill Mason
- Stanley Brown as Tascosa
- Nick Thompson as Ochella
- Eddie Laughton as Murph
