= Thundering Hoofs (1942 film) =

1942 film by Lesley Selander

- Directed by: Lesley Selander
- Written by: Paul Franklin
- Produced by: Bert Gilroy
- Starring: Tim Holt
- Cinematography: J. Roy Hunt
- Edited by: Frederic Knudtson
- Music by: Paul Sawtell
- Distributed by: RKO Radio Pictures
- Release date: May 1942
- Running time: 61 minutes
- Country: United States
- Language: English

Thundering Hoofs is a 1942 American Western film directed by Lesley Selander and starring Tim Holt. It was the first of many films Holt made with Selander.

== Plot ==
In the Old West, Bill Underwood falls out with his father, Dave Underwood, and chooses the life of a cowhand rather than take charge of his father's stage line. En route to the town of Durango, Bill and his pals, Smokey Ryan and Whopper Hatch, prevent a holdup of the Kellogg Stage Line, which Dave has been trying to purchase. Dave's lawyer, Steve Farley, has been double crossing Dave in the negotiations for the stage line by misrepresenting the offer. Bill discovers Farley has been corrupting the stage drivers working for Mr. Kellogg and his daughter, Nancy.

Bill assumes the surname "Dawson" and hires out as a driver for the Kelloggs. Farley attempts to plant stolen mail with Bill, but Bill and his pals thwart the plan. Farley discovers Bill's true identity and tells Nancy that Bill is an Underwood spy. Nancy fires Bill and intends to drive the stage herself to save the mail contract. Knowing that Farley and his men intend to holdup the stage, Bill and his pals intervene and deliver the mail to its proper destination. Dave arrives in Durango and implicates Farley. Underwood and Kellogg ink the deal for the sale of the stage line on their original terms, with a fountain pen which Whopper inadvertently causes to leak, splattering Bill.

== Cast ==
- Tim Holt as Bill Underwood
- Ray Whitley as 'Smokey' Ryan
- Lee 'Lasses' White as 'Whopper' Hatch
- Luana Walters as Nancy Kellogg
- Archie Twitchell as Steve Farley
- Gordon De Main as Dave Underwood
- Charles R. Phipps as Mr. Kellogg (credited as Charles Phipps)
- Monte Montague as Slick, a Henchman
- Joseph E. Bernard as Hank, the Stage Driver (credited as Joe Bernard)
- Frank Fanning as Postal Inspector
- Fred Scott as Dave Armstrong
- Frank Ellis as Carver, a Henchman

uncredited

- Ken Card as Banjo Player
- Spade Cooley as Fiddler
- Phil Dunham as Clem, a Telegrapher
- Lloyd Ingraham as Telegrapher #2
- Bob Kortman as Henchman
- Richard Martin as Man at Dance
- Frank O'Connor as Reluctant Stage Driver
- Francis Sayles as Clerk
