= Fred Scott (actor) =

American actor

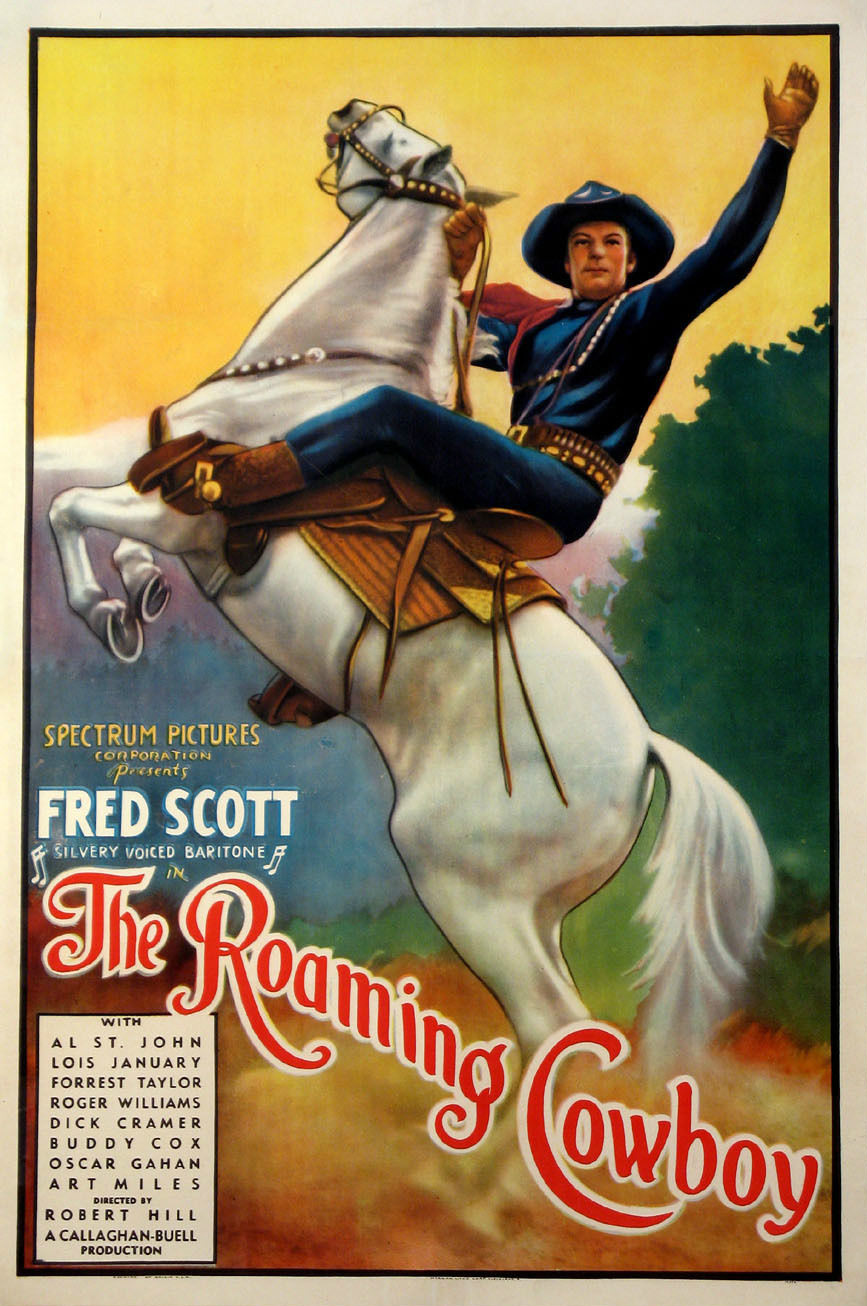
Poster for The Roaming Cowboy (1937)

Fred Leedom Scott (February 14, 1902 – December 16, 1991) was an American actor best known as a singing cowboy star in Westerns during the 1930s and 1940s.

== Biography ==
Scott was born on February 14, 1902, in Fresno, California, United States. He took voice lessons as a child and started acting in community theater at sixteen followed by working with a traveling troupe. Scott's family moved to Llano del Rio. He found work as a cowboy on a cattle ranch and tried to parlay the skills into film roles on horseback. He spent three years at Pathé as Helen Twelvetrees leading man. He broke into Westerns with a singing part in a Harry Carey film.

For a while, Scott did opera and stage performances before returning to Hollywood and becoming a leading man in many musical Westerns produced by Spectrum Pictures earning him the nickname "The Silvery-Voiced Buckaroo." His first starring role as a singing cowboy was 1936's Romance Rides the Range, and he subsequently starred in The Singing Buckaroo and Melody of the Plains (both 1937), Songs and Bullets (1938) and Two Gun Troubador (1939). He made nearly two dozen films with comedy sidekick Al St. John, and some of his films were produced by Stan Laurel.

Scott retired from film in the late 1940s and managed his own rental properties. He died on December 16, 1991, in Riverside, California.

== Filmography ==
- The Grand Parade (1930)
- Swing High (1930)
- Beyond Victory (1931)
- The Last Outlaw (1936)
- Romance Rides the Range (1936)
- The Fighting Deputy (1937)
- Make a Wish (1937)
- Melody of the Plains (1937)
- Moonlight on the Range (1937)
- The Roaming Cowboy (1937)
- The Singing Buckaroo (1937)
- Knight of the Plains (1938)
- The Rangers' Round-Up (1938)
- Songs and Bullets (1938)
- Code of the Fearless (1939)
- In Old Montana (1939)
- Two Gun Troubador (1939)
- Ridin' the Trail (1940)
- Rodeo Rhythm (1942)
- Thundering Hoofs (1942)
