= Gladys Johnston =

Canadian artist

Gladys Johnston (née Foster; 1906–1983) was a Canadian artist known primarily for her landscapes. Johnston was a self-taught painter; she was also an author, writing local and family history books and travel stories. Johnston spent most of her life in British Columbia, living in Salmon Arm from 1944 until her death in 1983. Major exhibitions of her work were held in 1988 and 2007.

== Biography ==
Man in Canoe and Grizzly, 1960s. Oil on masonite. 46.0 x 60.6 cm

Johnston was born Gladys Foster in Birch Hills, Saskatchewan in 1906. She showed promise as an artist at an early age. As a child on her family's dairy farm she would often draw the team of horses grazing outside her kitchen window. Her family encouraged her in developing these skills, alongside her studies in piano and writing. In 1925 she completed a brief painting course at the University of Saskatchewan. She married Ernest Johnston in 1926, with whom she had three sons. Johnston's painting may have been influenced by her husband. (Her husband also painted, and he had spent time learning from Charles Russell in Montana before his marriage.) However, her earliest works predate the marriage, and her color sense and style of paint application was very different from her husband's. Her earliest works are signed Gladys Foster.

Gladys Johnston was very industrious as she homesteaded with her husband. There were many demands on her time as she raised her three sons, kept the household running, and helped with the trapping, log cabin construction and gardening. Her paintings were a part of how she supplemented the family income, along with writing and reading tea leaves. Her artworks were not lauded as special or rare pieces of fine art during this time. They were simply a part of her impetus to express herself in various ways, as well as another commodity with which she could support herself and her family.

The subject matter of Gladys Johnston's paintings deal with the local geography of the places she lived in and around British Columbia, adventure scenes (such as a man in a canoe encountering a bear, a man being thrown from a horse), nature and other homesteading scenes. She kept several scrapbooks and diaries. The scrapbooks were filled with sketches and pages torn from popular magazines. Her diaries included records of things seen while traveling and lists of chores. These are written in a straightforward, yet often poetic, fashion.

Her vibrant use of colour is notable, as she made use of a full spectrum palette. The saturated hues are grounded by touches of black and nuanced neutrals. Purples are liberally used in skies and mountains. The sense of space is odd, subordinate to the narrative. Thin glazes sit next to thickly applied paintstrokes outlining figures.

Johnston died in Salmon Arm, British Columbia in 1983.

== Works cited ==
- Ainslie, Patricia; Cran, Chris (1988). The Vibrant Art of Gladys Johnston. Canada: The Glenbow-Alberta Institute. ISBN 0-919224-80-6.
