= Harry Harvey Sr. =

American actor (1901–1985)

Harry William Harvey Sr.
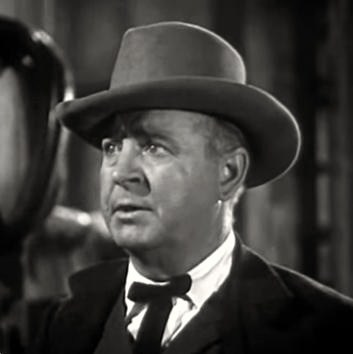
- Harvey in Gangsters of the Frontier (1944)
- Born: Harry William Harvey; January 10, 1901; Indian Territory, U.S.
- Died: November 27, 1985 (aged 84)
- Occupations: Actor of stage, film, and television
- Years active: 1932–1974
- Spouse: Mabel Frances Mason Harvey
- Children: 1

Harry William Harvey Sr. (January 10, 1901 – November 27, 1985) was an American actor of theatre, film, and television, with more than 300 movies and TV episodes to his credit. Movie fans know Harry Harvey as Leon Errol's perennial confidant in Errol's two-reel comedies for RKO Radio Pictures, and as a character player in serials for Columbia Pictures. Television viewers may recall him for his performances on The Lone Ranger (1949) and The Roy Rogers Show (1951–1957).

== Career ==
Harvey was born in Indian Territory, now Oklahoma, and appeared in minstrel shows, in vaudeville, and on the Broadway stage.

Harry Harvey began working in motion pictures in 1932, and established himself as a freelance character player. Although remembered as a fixture in dozens of RKO features and shorts, he actually worked at several studios during the 1930s and 1940s, although he did work exclusively for RKO between late 1945 and mid-1948. He usually played bits and small roles in feature films (reporters, clerks, waiters, stewards, etc.). He received larger roles in westerns, and featured roles in two-reel comedies. He began working with RKO's comedy star Leon Errol in 1939, and within a few years he was Errol's affable second lead, the best friend who tried to extricate the trouble-prone comic from his latest predicament. Harvey continued to appear in RKO films through 1952.

== Television ==
Harvey was cast from 1951 to 1957 in the role of Sheriff Tom Blodgett in fifty-three episodes of The Roy Rogers Show. In 1956 he appeared uncredited as the Marshal on the TV western Cheyenne in the episode "The Last Train West." That same year, he appeared as Tom Lovelace in another Cheyenne episode titled "Johnny Bravo."

He played Mayor George Dixon of fictitious Yellowstone in twenty-one episodes from 1957 to 1959 of the syndicated western series, Man Without a Gun. He was cast in different roles in eleven episodes of The Lone Ranger from 1949 to 1955. In 1960 Harvey appeared as Citizen on the TV western Laramie in the episode titled "Duel at Parkinson Town."

In 1962, he appeared on the short-lived NBC drama series, It's a Man's World as the recurring character, Houghton Stott, owner of Stott's Service Station.

In the 1950s, 1960s, and 1970s, he guest-starred in such series as Branded, Lassie, Hazel, Leave it to Beaver, Kentucky Jones, Gunsmoke, The Wild Wild West, Mannix, Alias Smith and Jones, Bonanza, and Columbo. His last appearance was in an episode of Adam-12 (1974).

== Personal life ==
He married Mabel Frances Mason; their son was actor, script supervisor, and director Harry Harvey Jr.

== Selected filmography ==
- 1932: Destry Rides Again as Stage Passenger (uncredited)
- 1935: Manhattan Moon as Newspaper Reporter
- 1935: Skybound as George Duncan
- 1936: The Oregon Trail as Tim
- 1936: Ticket to Paradise as Spotter
- 1936: Headline Crasher as City Editor
- 1936: The Reckless Way as Joe Black
- 1936: The Moon's Our Home as Reporter
- 1937: Special Agent K-7 as Speedy
- 1937: High Hat as Nelson Connolly
- 1938: Here's Flash Casey as Gus Payton
- 1938: King of the Sierras as Pete
- 1938: Six Shootin' Sheriff as Todd
- 1939: Lone Star Pioneers as Eph Brown
- 1939: Mercy Plane as Curly
- 1939: Two Gun Troubador as Elmer Potts
- 1940: Phantom Rancher as Gopher
- 1940: Texas Renegades as Sidekick Noisy
- 1940: Deadwood Dick as Dave Miller
- 1940: Ridin' the Trail as Fuzzy Jones
- 1942: The Pride of the Yankees as Joe McCarthy
- 1943: Return of the Rangers as Philip Dobbs
- 1944: Gangsters of the Frontier as Mr. Merritt
- 1946: Step by Step as Senator Remmy
- 1946: Badman's Territory as Stationmaster (uncredited)
- 1947: Trail Street as Mayor
- 1947: Sinbad the Sailor as Crier at Execution (uncredited)
- 1948: The Arizona Ranger as Payton, Stagecoach Agent
- 1948: They Live by Night as Hagenheimer
- 1949: Death Valley Gunfighter as Vinson McKnight
- 1949: I Cheated the Law as Second Judge
- 1949-1955: The Lone Ranger (TV series) (11 episodes) as Clem / Doc Andrews / Doc Robbins / Doc Weston / Ed Bates / Fred Niles / Jim Lackey / Mayor / Sam Blake / Sheriff Jim Dixon / Tim Dillon
- 1950: Cow Town as Sheriff Steve Calhoun
- 1950: Unmasked as Saunders
- 1951: Whirlwind as Sheriff Barlow
- 1951: Arizona Manhunt as Doctor Sawyer
- 1951-1957: The Roy Rogers Show (TV series) (54 episodes) as Sheriff Tom Blodgett / Sheriff John Blodgett / Williams / Hank Fisher / Minister / Sheriff Williams
- 1952: High Noon as Coy (uncredited)
- 1952: The Duel at Silver Creek as Mr. Cromwell (uncredited)
- 1952: Ma and Pa Kettle at the Fair as Jam-Judging Committee Chairman (uncredited)
- 1953: Old Overland Trail as Storekeeper
- 1954: Highway Dragnet as Mr. Carson
- 1957-1959: Man Without a Gun (TV series) (22 episodes) as Mayor George Dixon
- 1960-1961: Laramie (TV series)
  - (Season 2 Episode 8: ".45 Caliber") as Townsman (uncredited)
  - (Season 2 Episode 12: "Duel at Parkinson Town") as Citizen
  - (Season 2 Episode 23: "Run of the Hunted") as Tolan
  - (Season 3 Episode 5: "The Fatal Step") as Postmaster
- 1962: Lawman (TV series) (Season 4 Episode 37: "The Actor") as Dr. Wilson
- 1962-1963: It's a Man's World (TV series) (18 episodes) as Houghton Stott
- 1963: The Alfred Hitchcock Hour (Season 1 Episode 24: "The Star Juror") as Dr. Vince
- 1963: The Alfred Hitchcock Hour (Season 2 Episode 3: "Terror at Northfield") as Mayor Sanford Brown
- 1963: Leave it to Beaver (Season 6 Episode 33: "Summer in Alaska") as Captain Drake
- 1964: Disneyland
- 1965: Cat Ballou as Train Conductor (uncredited)
- 1965: Kentucky Jones (TV series) (Season 1 Episode 20: "Senior Citizen") as Uncle Henry
- 1965-1971: Gunsmoke (TV series) (8 episodes)
  - (Season 10 Episode 25: "Breckinridge") as Old Man
  - (Season 13 Episode 9: "The Pillagers") as Eli
  - (Season 13 Episode 18: "Nowhere to Run") as Storekeeper
  - (Season 14 Episode 7: "9:12 to Dodge") as Dispatcher
  - (Season 16 Episode 4: "Sam McTavish M.D.") as Johnson
  - (Season 17 Episode 12: "Gold Train: The Bullet, Part 1") as Drummer
  - (Season 17 Episode 13: "Gold Train: The Bullet, Part 2") as Drummer
  - (Season 17 Episode 14: "Gold Train: The Bullet, Part 3") as Drummer
- 1966: Ride Beyond Vengeance as Vogan
- 1966: Petticoat Junction (TV series) (Season 3 Episode 16: "Better Never Than Late") as Mr. Billings
- 1968: Bewitched (TV Series) (Season 4 Episode 27: "Tabitha's Crank Spell") as Uncle Willie
- 1969: The Ballad of Andy Crocker (TV Movie) as Mr. Kirkaby
- 1970: Marcus Welby M.D. (TV series) (Season 2 Episode 4: "Epidemic") as Mr. Simpson
- 1970: Airport as Dr. Avery Smith, Passenger (uncredited)
- 1974: Adam-12 (TV Series) (Season 7 Episode 9: "Alcohol") as Reverend Harvey

== Sources ==
- King of the Cowboys, Queen of the West: Roy Rogers and Dale Evans, by Raymond E. White, A Ray and Pat Browne Book, Popular Press 3; 1st edition (July 17, 2006); ISBN 0299210049/ISBN 978-0299210045
