= Elmer Dyer =

First film cameraman to specialize in aerial photography

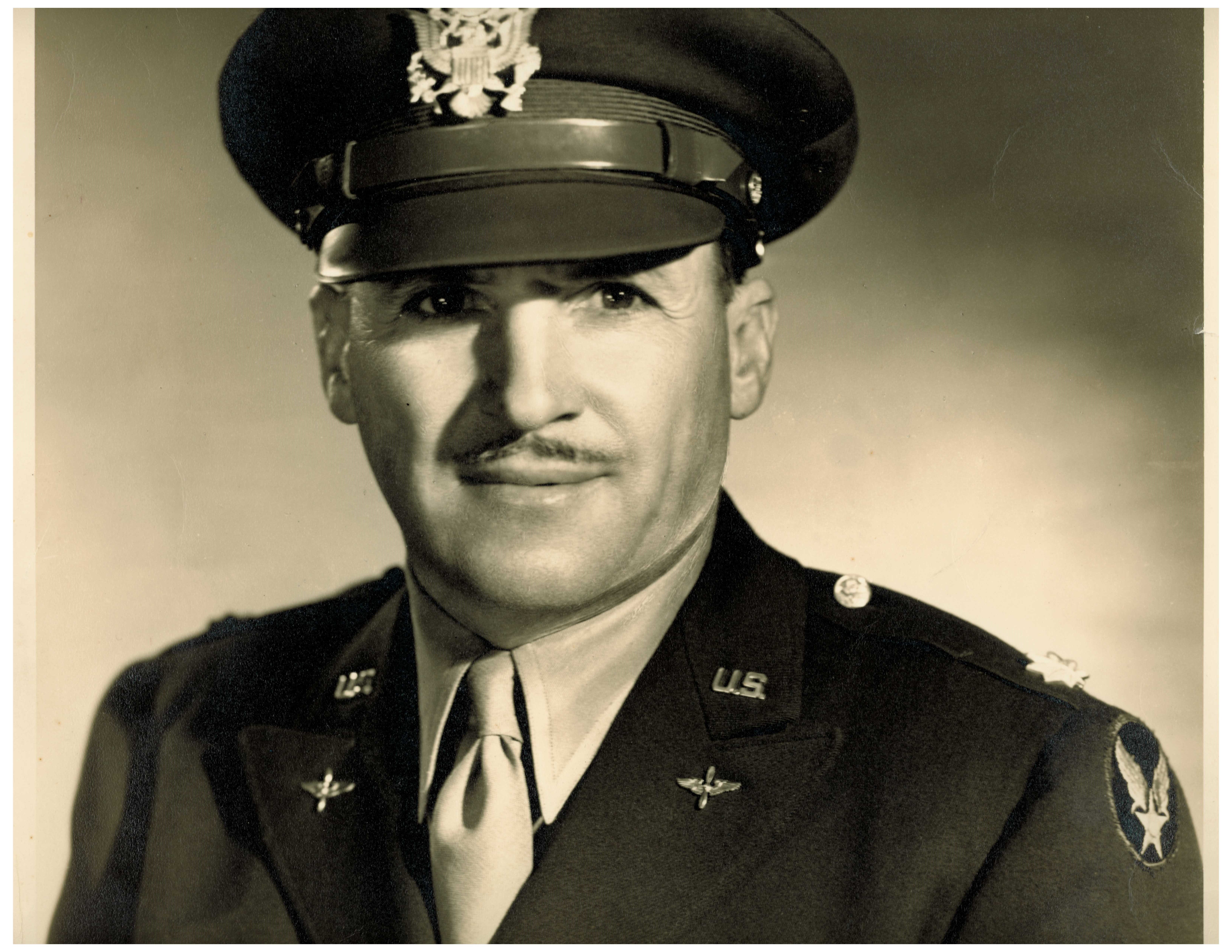
- Born: August 24, 1892; Lawrence, Kansas
- Died: February 8, 1970 (aged 77); Hollywood
- Occupation: Cinematographer

Elmer Dyer, A.S.C. (August 24, 1892 – February 8, 1970) was an American cinematographer, the first film cameraman to specialize in aerial photography.

Dyer was born in Lawrence, Kansas, and died in Hollywood. He first worked for Universal starting in 1912. During World War II Dyer was assigned to the Army's Motion Picture Unit. He was nominated for an Academy Award for his photography in Air Force (1943).

== Selected filmography ==
- Code of the Northwest (1926)
