= List of American films of 1935 =

American films released in 1935

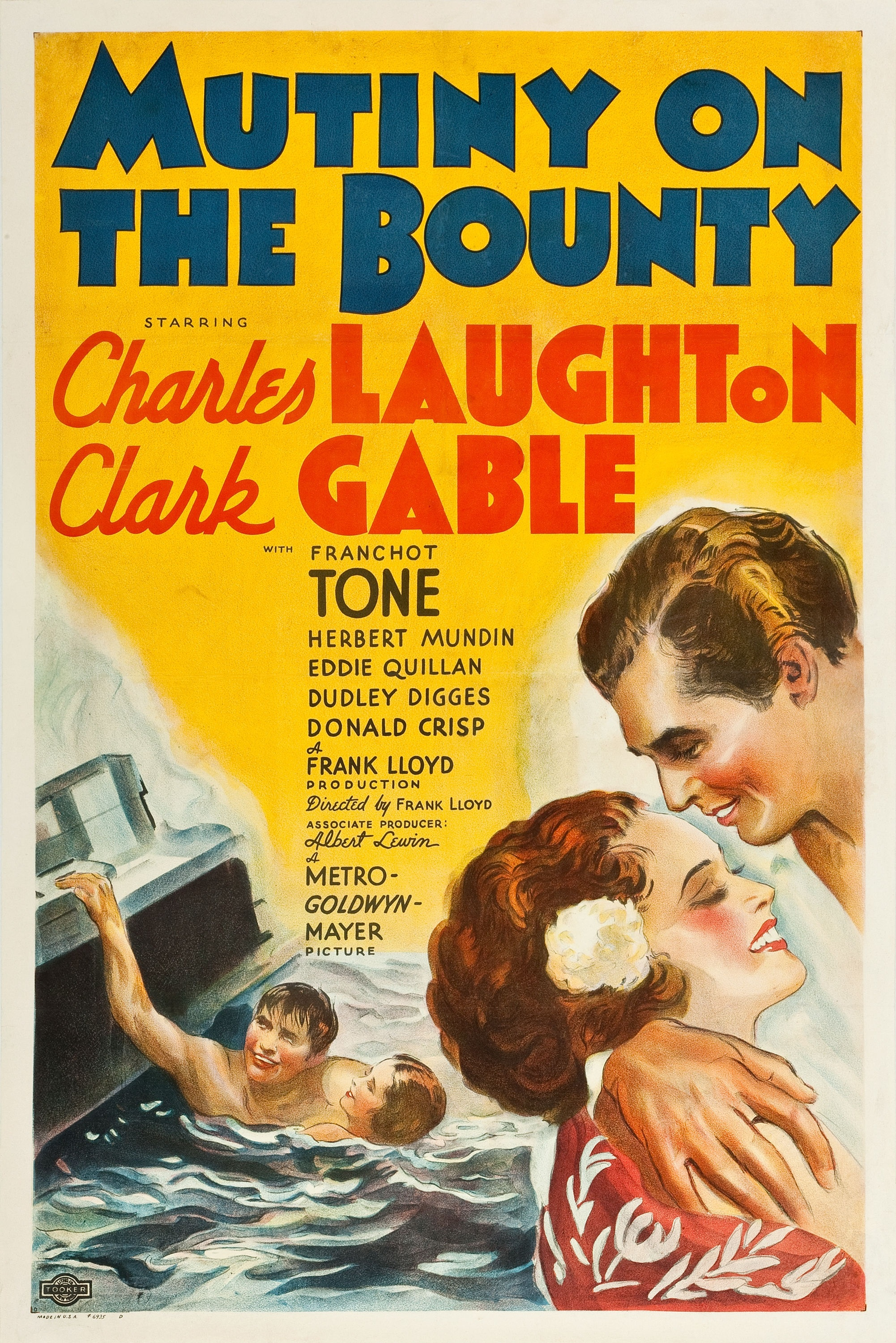
Mutiny on the Bounty starring Clark Gable and Charles Laughton.

More than 525 American feature-length motion pictures were released in 1935. A selection are listed alphabetically below.

Mutiny on the Bounty won the Academy Award for Outstanding Picture at the 8th Academy Awards, presented on March 5, 1936.

== A–B ==
Title	Director	Featured Cast	Genre	Note
$10 Raise	George Marshall	Edward Everett Horton, Karen Morley, Berton Churchill	Comedy	Fox Film
1,000 Dollars a Minute	Aubrey Scotto	Roger Pryor, Leila Hyams, Edward Brophy	Comedy	Republic
Accent on Youth	Wesley Ruggles	Sylvia Sidney, Herbert Marshall, Phillip Reed	Comedy	Paramount
Adventurous Knights	Charles E. Roberts	David Sharpe, Gertrude Messinger, Mary Kornman	Comedy	Independent
The Affair of Susan	Kurt Neumann	ZaSu Pitts, Hugh O'Connell, Inez Courtney	Comedy	Universal
After Office Hours	Robert Z. Leonard	Constance Bennett, Clark Gable, Billie Burke	Drama, Crime	MGM
After the Dance	Leo Bulgakov	Nancy Carroll, George Murphy, Thelma Todd	Drama	Columbia
Age of Indiscretion	Edward Ludwig	Paul Lukas, Madge Evans, Helen Vinson	Drama	MGM
Ah, Wilderness!	Clarence Brown	Wallace Beery, Lionel Barrymore, Mickey Rooney	Comedy, Drama	MGM
Air Hawks	Albert S. Rogell	Ralph Bellamy, Tala Birell, Douglass Dumbrille	Drama, Action	Columbia
Alias John Law	Robert N. Bradbury	Bob Steele, Roberta Gale, Buck Connors	Western	Independent
Alias Mary Dow	Kurt Neumann	Sally Eilers, Ray Milland, Katharine Alexander	Drama	Universal
Alibi Ike	Ray Enright	Joe E. Brown, Olivia de Havilland, Ruth Donnelly	Comedy	Warner Bros.
Alice Adams	George Stevens	Katharine Hepburn, Fred MacMurray, Evelyn Venable	Drama, Romance	RKO
All the King's Horses	Frank Tuttle	Carl Brisson, Mary Ellis, Edward Everett Horton	Comedy	Paramount
Anna Karenina	Clarence Brown	Greta Garbo, Fredric March, Maureen O'Sullivan	Drama	MGM
Annapolis Farewell	Alexander Hall	Guy Standing, Richard Cromwell, Tom Brown	Drama	Paramount
Annie Oakley	George Stevens	Barbara Stanwyck, Melvyn Douglas, Preston Foster	Drama, Western	RKO
Another Face	Christy Cabanne	Wallace Ford, Brian Donlevy, Phyllis Brooks	Crime	RKO
Arizona Bad Man	S. Roy Luby	Reb Russell, Lois January, Edmund Cobb	Western	Independent
The Arizonian	Charles Vidor, Dewey Starkey	Richard Dix, Margot Grahame, Preston Foster, Louis Calhern	Western	RKO
Atlantic Adventure	Albert S. Rogell	Nancy Carroll, Lloyd Nolan, Harry Langdon	Mystery	Columbia
The Awakening of Jim Burke	Lambert Hillyer	Jack Holt, Florence Rice, Kathleen Burke	Drama	Columbia
Baby Face Harrington	Raoul Walsh	Charles Butterworth, Una Merkel, Nat Pendleton	Comedy	MGM
Bad Boy	John G. Blystone	James Dunn, Dorothy Wilson, Louise Fazenda	Comedy	Fox Film
Bar 20 Rides Again	Howard Bretherton	William Boyd, Jean Rouverol, James Ellison	Western	Paramount
Barbary Coast	Howard Hawks	Edward G. Robinson, Miriam Hopkins, Joel McCrea	Drama, Adventure	United Artists
Bars of Hate	Albert Herman	Regis Toomey, Sheila Terry, Molly O'Day	Crime	Independent
Becky Sharp	Rouben Mamoulian, Lowell Sherman	Miriam Hopkins, Cedric Hardwicke, Frances Dee	Drama	RKO
Behind the Evidence	Lambert Hillyer	Norman Foster, Sheila Bromley, Donald Cook	Drama	Columbia
Behind the Green Lights	Christy Cabanne	Norman Foster, Judith Allen, Sidney Blackmer	Crime	Mascot
The Best Man Wins	Erle C. Kenton	Edmund Lowe, Jack Holt, Bela Lugosi	Crime drama	Columbia
Between Men	Robert N. Bradbury	Johnny Mack Brown, Beth Marion, William Farnum	Western	Independent
Big Boy Rides Again	Albert Herman	Guinn "Big Boy" Williams, Charles K. French, Lafe McKee	Western	Independent
The Big Broadcast of 1936	Norman Taurog	George Burns, Gracie Allen, Ethel Merman	Musical comedy	Paramount
Big Calibre	Robert N. Bradbury	Bob Steele, Forrest Taylor, John Elliott	Western	Independent
Biography of a Bachelor Girl	Edward H. Griffith	Ann Harding, Robert Montgomery, Edward Arnold	Romantic comedy	MGM
The Bishop Misbehaves	E. A. Dupont	Edmund Gwenn, Maureen O'Sullivan, Reginald Owen	Comedy crime	MGM
Black Fury	Michael Curtiz	Paul Muni, Karen Morley, Barton MacLane	Drama	Warner Bros.
The Black Room	Roy William Neill	Boris Karloff, Marian Marsh, Thurston Hall	Horror	Columbia
Black Sheep	Allan Dwan	Edmund Lowe, Claire Trevor, Eugene Pallette	Drama	Fox Film
Blazing Guns	Ray Heinz	Reb Russell, Marion Shilling, Lafe McKee	Western	Majestic
Bonnie Scotland	James W. Horne	Stan Laurel, Oliver Hardy, June Lang	Comedy	MGM
Bordertown	Archie Mayo	Paul Muni, Bette Davis, Margaret Lindsay	Drama, Crime	Warner Bros.
Border Brigands	Nick Grinde	Buck Jones, Lona Andre, Fred Kohler	Western	Universal
Border Vengeance	Ray Heinz	Reb Russell, Kenneth MacDonald, Clarence Geldart	Western	Independent
Born to Battle	Harry S. Webb	Tom Tyler, Jean Carmen, Julian Rivero	Western	Independent
Born to Gamble	Phil Rosen	Onslow Stevens, H. B. Warner, Maxine Doyle	Drama	Republic
Branded a Coward	Sam Newfield	Johnny Mack Brown, Billie Seward, Lloyd Ingraham	Western	Independent
Break of Hearts	Philip Moeller	Katharine Hepburn, Charles Boyer, Jean Hersholt	Drama	RKO
The Bride Comes Home	Wesley Ruggles	Claudette Colbert, Fred MacMurray, Robert Young	Comedy	Paramount
Bride of Frankenstein	James Whale	Boris Karloff, Elsa Lanchester, Colin Clive	Sci-fi, Horror	Universal
Bright Lights	Busby Berkeley	Joe E. Brown, Ann Dvorak, Patricia Ellis	Comedy	Warner Bros.
Broadway Gondolier	Lloyd Bacon	Dick Powell, Joan Blondell, Adolphe Menjou	Musical	Warner Bros.
Broadway Hostess	Frank McDonald	Winifred Shaw, Genevieve Tobin, Lyle Talbot	Musical	Warner Bros.
Broadway Melody of 1936	Roy Del Ruth	Eleanor Powell, Robert Taylor, Jack Benny	Musical comedy	MGM
Bulldog Courage	Sam Newfield	Tim McCoy, Joan Woodbury, Karl Hackett	Western	Independent

== C–D ==
Title	Director	Featured cast	Genre	Note
The Cactus Kid	Harry S. Webb	Tom Tyler, Jayne Regan, Philo McCullough	Western	Independent
The Call of the Wild	William A. Wellman	Clark Gable, Loretta Young, Jack Oakie	Drama, Adventure	United Artists
Calling All Cars	Spencer Gordon Bennet	Jack La Rue, Lillian Miles, Jack Norton	Crime	Independent
The Calling of Dan Matthews	Phil Rosen	Richard Arlen, Charlotte Wynters, Donald Cook	Drama	Columbia
Calm Yourself	George B. Seitz	Robert Young, Madge Evans, Betty Furness	Comedy	MGM
Cappy Ricks Returns	Mack V. Wright	Robert McWade, Ray Walker, Lucien Littlefield	Comedy	Republic
Captain Blood	Michael Curtiz	Errol Flynn, Olivia de Havilland, Lionel Atwill	Adventure, Action	Warner Bros.
Captain Hurricane	John S. Robertson	James Barton, Helen Westley, Gene Lockhart	Comedy, Drama	RKO
Captured in Chinatown	Elmer Clifton	Marion Shilling, Charles Delaney, Philo McCullough	Crime	Independent
Car 99	Charles Barton	Fred MacMurray, Ann Sheridan, Guy Standing	Drama, Crime	Paramount
Cardinal Richelieu	Rowland V. Lee	George Arliss, Maureen O'Sullivan, Cesar Romero	Drama, Romance	United Artists
Carnival	Walter Lang	Jimmy Durante, Lee Tracy, Sally Eilers	Comedy	Columbia
The Case of the Curious Bride	Michael Curtiz	Warren William, Claire Dodd, Allen Jenkins	Drama, Crime	Warner Bros.
The Case of the Lucky Legs	Michael Curtiz	Warren William, Genevieve Tobin, Patricia Ellis	Drama, Crime	Warner Bros.
The Case of the Missing Man	D. Ross Lederman	Roger Pryor, Joan Perry, Thurston Hall	Crime	Columbia
The Casino Murder Case	Edwin L. Marin	Paul Lukas, Alison Skipworth, Rosalind Russell	Comedy, Mystery	MGM
Champagne for Breakfast	Melville W. Brown	Mary Carlisle, Hardie Albright, Joan Marsh	Comedy	Columbia
Charlie Chan in Egypt	Louis King	Warner Oland, Rita Hayworth, Pat Paterson	Mystery, Comedy	Fox Film
Charlie Chan in Paris	Lewis Seiler	Warner Oland, Mary Brian, Thomas Beck	Mystery, Comedy	Fox Film
Charlie Chan in Shanghai	James Tinling	Warner Oland, Irene Hervey, Jon Hall	Mystery, comedy	Fox Film
Chasing Yesterday	George Nicholls Jr.	Anne Shirley, O. P. Heggie, Helen Westley	Drama	RKO
Cheers of the Crowd	Vin Moore	Russell Hopton, Irene Ware, Harry Holman	Drama	Monogram
The Cheyenne Tornado	William A. O'Connor	Reb Russell, Victoria Vinton, Roger Williams	Western	Independent
China Seas	Tay Garnett	Clark Gable, Jean Harlow, Wallace Beery	Adventure	MGM
Chinatown Squad	Murray Roth	Lyle Talbot, Valerie Hobson, Hugh O'Connell	Crime	Universal
Circumstantial Evidence	Charles Lamont	Chick Chandler, Shirley Grey, Claude King	Drama, Crime	Chesterfield
Circus Shadows	Charles Hutchison	Dorothy Wilson, Kane Richmond, William Ruhl	Crime	Independent
Clive of India	Richard Boleslawski	Ronald Colman, Loretta Young, Colin Clive	Historical	United Artists
Code of the Mounted	Sam Newfield	Kermit Maynard, Robert Warwick, Lillian Miles	Western	Independent
College Scandal	Elliott Nugent	Arline Judge, Kent Taylor, Wendy Barrie	Comedy	Paramount
Collegiate	Ralph Murphy	Jack Oakie, Frances Langford, Betty Grable	Comedy	Paramount
Condemned to Live	Frank R. Strayer	Ralph Morgan, Maxine Doyle, Russell Gleason	Mystery, Horror	Chesterfield
Confidential	Edward L. Cahn	Donald Cook, Evalyn Knapp, Theodore von Eltz	Crime	Mascot
Convention Girl	Luther Reed	Rose Hobart, Weldon Heyburn, Sally O'Neil	Comedy	Independent
Coronado	Norman Z. McLeod	Alice White, Johnny Downs, Eddy Duchin	Musical	Paramount
The County Chairman	John G. Blystone	Will Rogers, Evelyn Venable, Kent Taylor	Comedy	Fox Film
Courage of the North	Robert Emmett Tansey	William Desmond, Tom London, Jimmy Aubrey	Western	Independent
The Courageous Avenger	Robert N. Bradbury	Johnny Mack Brown, Warner Richmond, Eddie Parker	Western	Independent
The Cowboy and the Bandit	Albert Herman	Rex Lease, Blanche Mehaffey, Bill Patton	Western	Independent
The Cowboy Millionaire	Edward F. Cline	George O'Brien, Edgar Kennedy, Evalyn Bostock	Western	Fox Film
Coyote Trails	Bernard B. Ray	Tom Tyler, Alice Dahl, Ben Corbett	Western	Independent
Crime and Punishment	Josef von Sternberg	Peter Lorre, Edward Arnold, Marian Marsh	Crime drama	Columbia
The Crime of Dr. Crespi	John H. Auer	Erich von Stroheim, Dwight Frye, Paul Guilfoyle	Horror	Republic
The Crimson Trail	Alfred Raboch	Buck Jones, Polly Ann Young, Ward Bond	Western	Universal
The Crusades	Cecil B. DeMille	Loretta Young, Henry Wilcoxon, C. Aubrey Smith	Adventure	Paramount
Curly Top	Irving Cummings	Shirley Temple, John Boles, Rochelle Hudson	Musical	Fox Film
Cyclone of the Saddle	Elmer Clifton	Rex Lease, Janet Chandler, Yakima Canutt	Western	Independent
The Cyclone Ranger	Robert F. Hill	Bill Cody, Nina Quartero, Eddie Gribbon	Western	Independent
Danger Ahead	Albert Herman	Lawrence Gray, Fuzzy Knight, Sheila Bromley	Drama, Crime	Victory
Danger Trails	Robert F. Hill	Guinn 'Big Boy' Williams, John Elliott, Hal Taliaferro	Western	Independent
Dangerous	Alfred E. Green	Bette Davis, Franchot Tone, Alison Skipworth	Drama	Warner Bros.
Dante's Inferno	Harry Lachman	Spencer Tracy, Henry B. Walthall, Rita Hayworth	Horror	Fox Film; Remake of 1924 film
The Daring Young Man	William A. Seiter	James Dunn, Mae Clarke, Neil Hamilton	Comedy	Fox Film
The Dark Angel	Sidney Franklin	Merle Oberon, Fredric March, Herbert Marshall	Drama, Romance	United Artists
David Copperfield	George Cukor	Frank Lawton, Roland Young, Maureen O'Sullivan	Drama, Romance	MGM
The Dawn Rider	Robert N. Bradbury	John Wayne, Marion Burns, Dennis Moore	Western	Monogram
Death Flies East	Phil Rosen	Conrad Nagel, Florence Rice, Raymond Walburn	Mystery	Columbia
Death from a Distance	Frank R. Strayer	Russell Hopton, Lola Lane, Lee Kohlmar	Mystery	Chesterfield
Defying the Law	Robert J. Horner	Ted Wells, William Desmond, Milburn Morante	Western	Independent
The Desert Trail	Cullin Lewis	John Wayne, Mary Kornman, Eddy Chandler	Western	Monogram
Devil Dogs of the Air	Lloyd Bacon	James Cagney, Pat O'Brien, Margaret Lindsay	Comedy, Drama	Warner Bros.
The Devil is a Woman	Josef von Sternberg	Marlene Dietrich, Lionel Atwill, Cesar Romero	Comedy, Drama	Paramount
Diamond Jim	A. Edward Sutherland	Edward Arnold, Jean Arthur, Binnie Barnes	Biopic	Universal
Dinky	Howard Bretherton	Jackie Cooper, Mary Astor, Roger Pryor	Drama	Warner Bros.
Dizzy Dames	William Nigh	Marjorie Rambeau, Florine McKinney, Inez Courtney	Comedy	Liberty
A Dog of Flanders	Edward Sloman	Frankie Thomas, O. P. Heggie, Helen Parrish	Drama	RKO
Don't Bet on Blondes	Robert Florey	Warren William, Claire Dodd, Guy Kibbee	Comedy	Warner Bros.
Doubting Thomas	David Butler	Will Rogers, Billie Burke, Alison Skipworth	Comedy	Fox Film
Dr. Socrates	William Dieterle	Paul Muni, Ann Dvorak, Barton MacLane	Crime	Warner Bros.
Dressed to Thrill	Harry Lachman	Tutta Rolf, Clive Brook, Robert Barrat	Musical	Fox Film
The Drunkard	Albert Herman	James Murray, Clara Kimball Young, Janet Chandler	Drama	Independent

== E–F ==
Title	Director	Featured cast	Genre	Note
The Eagle's Brood	Howard Bretherton	William Boyd, James Ellison, William Farnum	Western	Paramount
East of Java	George Melford	Charles Bickford, Elizabeth Young, Frank Albertson	Adventure, Drama	Universal
Eight Bells	Roy William Neill	Ann Sothern, Ralph Bellamy, Catherine Doucet	Drama, Adventure	Columbia
Enchanted April	Harry Beaumont	Ann Harding, Frank Morgan, Jane Baxter	Comedy drama	RKO
Enter Madame	Elliott Nugent	Cary Grant, Elissa Landi, Sharon Lynn	Comedy	Paramount
Escapade	Robert Z. Leonard	William Powell, Luise Rainer, Reginald Owen	Comedy, Romance	MGM
Escape from Devil's Island	Albert S. Rogell	Victor Jory, Florence Rice, Norman Foster	Drama	Columbia
Every Night at Eight	Raoul Walsh	George Raft, Alice Faye, Frances Langford	Comedy, Musical	Paramount
False Pretenses	Charles Lamont	Irene Ware, Sidney Blackmer, Betty Compson	Comedy	Chesterfield
The Farmer Takes a Wife	Victor Fleming	Henry Fonda, Janet Gaynor, Charles Bickford	Comedy, Romance	Fox Film
A Feather in Her Hat	Alfred Santell	Pauline Lord, Basil Rathbone, Louis Hayward	Drama	Columbia
Fighting Caballero	Elmer Clifton	Rex Lease, Dorothy Gulliver, Robert Walker	Western	Independent
Fighting Lady	Carlos F. Borcosque	Peggy Shannon, Jack Mulhall, Mary Carr	Crime	Majestic
The Fighting Pilot	Noel M. Smith	Richard Talmadge, Gertrude Messinger	Action	Independent
Fighting Pioneers	Harry L. Fraser	Rex Bell, Ruth Mix, Stanley Blystone	Western	Independent
Fighting Shadows	David Selman	Tim McCoy, Geneva Mitchell, Robert Allen	Western	Columbia
Fighting Youth	Hamilton MacFadden	Charles Farrell, June Martel, Ann Sheridan	Drama	Universal
The Fire-Trap	Burt P. Lynwood	Norman Foster, Evalyn Knapp, Sidney Blackmer	Crime	Independent
Five Bad Men	Clifford Smith	Noah Beery Jr., Hal Taliaferro, William Desmond	Western	Independent
The Flame Within	Edmund Goulding	Maureen O'Sullivan, Ann Harding, Louis Heyward	Drama	MGM
The Florentine Dagger	Robert Florey	Donald Woods, Margaret Lindsay, C. Aubrey Smith	Mystery	Warner Bros.
Folies Bergère de Paris	Roy Del Ruth	Maurice Chevalier, Merle Oberon, Ann Sothern	Musical comedy	United Artists
Forbidden Heaven	Reginald Barker	Charles Farrell, Charlotte Henry, Beryl Mercer	Drama	Republic
Forced Landing	Melville W. Brown	Esther Ralston, Onslow Stevens, Sidney Blackmer	Mystery	Republic
Four Hours to Kill!	Mitchell Leisen	Richard Barthelmess, Roscoe Karns, Ray Milland	Drama, Crime	Paramount
Freckles	Edward Killy, William Hamilton	Tom Brown, Virginia Weidler, Lumsden Hare	Drama	RKO
Frisco Kid	Lloyd Bacon	James Cagney, Ricardo Cortez, Margaret Lindsay	Drama, Adventure	Warner Bros.
Frisco Waterfront	Arthur Lubin	Ben Lyon, Helen Twelvetrees, Rod La Rocque	Drama	Republic
Front Page Woman	Michael Curtiz	Bette Davis, George Brent, Roscoe Karns	Drama, Romance	Warner Bros.
Frontier Justice	Robert F. McGowan	Hoot Gibson, Richard Cramer, Roger Williams	Western	Independent

== G–H ==
Title	Director	Featured cast	Genre	Note
G Men	William Keighley	James Cagney, Ann Dvorak, Edward Pawley	Drama, Crime	Warner Bros.
Gallant Defender	David Selman	Charles Starrett, Joan Perry, Harry Woods	Western	Columbia
The Gay Deception	William Wyler	Francis Lederer, Frances Dee, Benita Hume	Romantic comedy	Fox Film
George White's 1935 Scandals	George White	Alice Faye, James Dunn, Eleanor Powell	Musical	Fox Film
Get That Man	Spencer Gordon Bennet	Wallace Ford, Leon Ames, Lillian Miles	Drama	Mayfair
The Ghost Rider	Jack Jevne	Rex Lease, Ann Carrol, Franklyn Farnum	Western	Independent
Gigolette	Charles Lamont	Adrienne Ames, Ralph Bellamy, Donald Cook, Robert Armstrong	Romance	RKO
The Gilded Lily	Wesley Ruggles	Claudette Colbert, Fred MacMurray, Ray Milland	Comedy, Romance	Paramount
Ginger	Lewis Seiler	Jane Withers, O. P. Heggie, Katharine Alexander	Comedy	Fox Film
The Girl Friend	Edward Buzzell	Ann Sothern, Jack Haley, Roger Pryor	Comedy	Columbia
The Girl from 10th Avenue	Alfred E. Green	Bette Davis, Ian Hunter, Alison Skipworth	Drama	Warner Bros.
The Girl Who Came Back	Charles Lamont	Shirley Grey, Noel Madison, Sidney Blackmer	Crime	Chesterfield
The Glass Key	Frank Tuttle	George Raft, Edward Arnold, Claire Dodd	Drama, Crime	Paramount
Go Into Your Dance	Archie Mayo	Al Jolson, Ruby Keeler, Glenda Farrell	Musical	Warner Bros.
Goin' to Town	Alexander Hall	Mae West, Paul Cavanagh, Gilbert Emery	Comedy, Musical	Paramount
Going Highbrow	Robert Florey	Edward Everett Horton, ZaSu Pitts, Guy Kibbee	Comedy, Romance	Warner Bros.
Gold Diggers of 1935	Busby Berkeley	Dick Powell, Alice Brady, Hugh Herbert	Comedy, Musical	Warner Bros.
The Good Fairy	William Wyler	Margaret Sullavan, Herbert Marshall, Frank Morgan	Romantic comedy	Universal
The Goose and the Gander	Alfred E. Green	Kay Francis, George Brent, Genevieve Tobin	Romantic comedy	Warner Bros.
Grand Exit	Erle C. Kenton	Edmund Lowe, Ann Sothern, Onslow Stevens	Mystery	Columbia
Grand Old Girl	John S. Robertson	May Robson, Fred MacMurray, Edward Van Sloan	Drama, Romance	RKO
Great God Gold	Arthur Lubin	Sidney Blackmer, Martha Sleeper, Regis Toomey	Drama	Monogram
The Great Hotel Murder	Eugene Forde	Edmund Lowe, Victor McLaglen, Rosemary Ames	Mystery	Fox Film
The Great Impersonation	Alan Crosland	Edmund Lowe, Valerie Hobson, Wera Engels	Mystery	Universal
Guard That Girl	Lambert Hillyer	Florence Rice, Ward Bond, Robert Allen	Mystery	Columbia
Gun Play	Albert Herman	Guinn 'Big Boy' Williams, Marion Shilling, Frank Yaconelli	Western	Independent
Hands Across the Table	Mitchell Leisen	Carole Lombard, Fred MacMurray, Ralph Bellamy	Comedy, Romance	Paramount
Happiness C.O.D.	Charles Lamont	Donald Meek, Irene Ware, Maude Eburne	Comedy	Chesterfield
Hard Rock Harrigan	David Howard	George O'Brien, Irene Hervey, Fred Kohler	Drama	Fox Film
Harmony Lane	Joseph Santley	Douglass Montgomery, Evelyn Venable, Adrienne Ames	Biopic	Mascot
The Headline Woman	William Nigh	Roger Pryor, Heather Angel, Franklin Pangborn	Drama, Crime	Republic
The Healer	Reginald Barker	Ralph Bellamy, Judith Allen, Mickey Rooney	Drama	Monogram
Heir to Trouble	Spencer Gordon Bennet	Ken Maynard, Joan Perry, Harry Woods	Western	Columbia
Here Comes Cookie	Norman Z. McLeod	George Burns, Gracie Allen, Betty Furness	Comedy	Paramount
Here Comes the Band	Paul Sloane	Ted Lewis, Virginia Bruce, Nat Pendleton	Comedy, Musical	MGM
Here's to Romance	Alfred E. Green	Nino Martini, Genevieve Tobin, Anita Louise	Musical	Fox Film
Hi, Gaucho!	Tommy Atkins	John Carroll, Steffi Duna, Rod La Rocque, Montagu Love	Comedy	RKO
His Family Tree	Charles Vidor	James Barton, Jack Randall, William Harrigan	Comedy	RKO
His Fighting Blood	John English	Kermit Maynard, Polly Ann Young, Paul Fix	Western	Independent
His Night Out	William Nigh	Edward Everett Horton, Irene Hervey, Jack La Rue	Comedy	Universal
Hitch Hike Lady	Aubrey Scotto	Alison Skipworth, Mae Clarke, Arthur Treacher	Comedy	Republic
Hold 'Em Yale	Sidney Lanfield	Patricia Ellis, Cesar Romero, William Frawley	Comedy	Paramount
Home on the Range	Arthur Jacobson	Randolph Scott, Jackie Coogan, Evelyn Brent	Western	Paramount
Honeymoon Limited	Arthur Lubin	Neil Hamilton, Irene Hervey, Lloyd Hughes	Comedy	Monogram
Hong Kong Nights	E. Mason Hopper	Tom Keene, Wera Engels, Warren Hymer	Thriller	Independent
Hooray for Love	Walter Lang	Ann Sothern, Gene Raymond, Thurston Hall	Musical comedy	RKO
The Hoosier Schoolmaster	Lewis D. Collins	Norman Foster, Charlotte Henry, Otis Harlan	Drama	Monogram
Hop-Along Cassidy	Howard Bretherton	William Boyd, James Ellison, Paula Stone	Western	Paramount
Hot Off the Press	Albert Herman	Jack La Rue, Monte Blue, Fuzzy Knight	Drama	Independent
Hot Tip	Ray McCarey, James Gleason	ZaSu Pitts, James Gleason, Margaret Callahan, Russell Gleason	Comedy	RKO

== I–J ==
Title	Director	Featured cast	Genre	Note
I Dream Too Much	Walter Lang	Henry Fonda, Lily Pons, Lucille Ball	Comedy, Musical	RKO
I Found Stella Parish	Mervyn LeRoy	Kay Francis, Ian Hunter, Paul Lukas	Drama	Warner Bros.
I Live for Love	Busby Berkeley	Dolores del Río, Everett Marshall, Don Alvarado	Musical, Romance	Warner Bros.
I Live My Life	W. S. Van Dyke	Joan Crawford, Brian Aherne, Frank Morgan	Comedy drama	MGM
I'll Love You Always	Leo Bulgakov	Nancy Carroll, George Murphy, Raymond Walburn	Drama	Columbia
I've Been Around	Philip Cahn	Chester Morris, Rochelle Hudson, Phyllis Brooks	Drama	Universal
If You Could Only Cook	William A. Seiter	Herbert Marshall, Jean Arthur, Leo Carrillo	Romantic comedy	Columbia
In Caliente	Lloyd Bacon	Dolores del Río, Pat O'Brien, Edward Everett Horton	Musical, Comedy	Warner Bros.
In Old Kentucky	George Marshall	Will Rogers, Dorothy Wilson, Charles Sellon	Comedy	Fox Film
In Person	William A. Seiter	Ginger Rogers, George Brent, Alan Mowbray	Romantic comedy	RKO
In Spite of Danger	Lambert Hillyer	Wallace Ford, Marian Marsh, Arthur Hohl	Action	Columbia
The Informer	John Ford	Victor McLaglen, Preston Foster, Donald Meek	Drama	RKO
The Irish in Us	Lloyd Bacon	James Cagney, Pat O'Brien, Olivia de Havilland	Comedy	Warner Bros.
The Irish Gringo	William C. Thompson	William Farnum, Bryant Washburn, Olin Francis	Western	Independent
It Happened in New York	Alan Crosland	Gertrude Michael, Heather Angel, Lyle Talbot	Comedy	Universal
It's a Great Life	Edward F. Cline	Paul Kelly, Rosalind Keith, William Frawley	Comedy Drama	Paramount
It's a Small World	Irving Cummings	Spencer Tracy, Wendy Barrie, Raymond Walburn	Comedy	Fox Film
It's in the Air	Charles Reisner	Jack Benny, Una Merkel, Mary Carlisle	Comedy	MGM
The Ivory-Handled Gun	Ray Taylor	Buck Jones, Walter Miller, Charlotte Wynters	Western	Universal
Jalna	John Cromwell	Kay Johnson, Ian Hunter, C. Aubrey Smith	Drama	RKO
The Judgement Book	Charles Hutchison	Conway Tearle, Bernadene Hayes, Richard Cramer	Western	Independent
Justice of the Range	David Selman	Ward Bond, Gabby Hayes, Tim McCoy	Western	Columbia

== K–L ==
Title	Director	Featured cast	Genre	Note
The Keeper of the Bees	Christy Cabanne	Neil Hamilton, Betty Furness, Emma Dunn	Drama	Monogram
Kentucky Blue Streak	Raymond K. Johnson	Edward J. Nugent, Frank Coghlan Jr., Cornelius Keefe	Drama	Independent
Kind Lady	George B. Seitz	Aline MacMahon, Basil Rathbone, Mary Carlisle	Drama	MGM
King Solomon of Broadway	Alan Crosland	Edmund Lowe, Dorothy Page, Louise Henry	Musical	Universal
Laddie	George Stevens	John Beal, Gloria Stuart, Virginia Weidler	Comedy, Drama	RKO
Ladies Crave Excitement	Nick Grinde	Norman Foster, Esther Ralston, Evalyn Knapp	Comedy	Republic
Ladies Love Danger	H. Bruce Humberstone	Mona Barrie, Gilbert Roland, Donald Cook	Comedy	Fox Film
The Lady in Scarlet	Charles Lamont	Reginald Denny, Patricia Farr, Jameson Thomas	Comedy	Chesterfield
Lady Tubbs	Alan Crosland	Alice Brady, Douglass Montgomery, Anita Louise	Comedy	Universal
The Laramie Kid	Harry S. Webb	Tom Tyler, Alberta Vaughn, Murdock MacQuarrie	Western	Independent
The Last Days of Pompeii	Merian C. Cooper	Preston Foster, Basil Rathbone, Alan Hale	Drama, Adventure	RKO
The Last of the Clintons	Harry L. Fraser	Harry Carey, Betty Mack, Victor Potel	Western	Independent
Last of the Pagans	Richard Thorpe	Ray Mala, Lotus Long, Rudolph Anders	Romance	MGM
The Last Outpost	Charles Barton, Louis J. Gasnier	Cary Grant, Claude Rains, Kathleen Burke	Drama, War	Paramount
Law Beyond the Range	Ford Beebe	Tim McCoy, Billie Seward, Robert Allen	Western	Columbia
The Law of the 45's	John P. McCarthy	Guinn 'Big Boy' Williams, Molly O'Day, Al St. John	Western	Independent
Lawless Border	John P. McCarthy	Bill Cody, Molly O'Day, Martin Garralaga	Western	Independent
Lawless Range	Robert N. Bradbury	John Wayne, Sheila Bromley, Jack Curtis	Western	Republic
Lawless Riders	Spencer Gordon Bennet	Ken Maynard, Geneva Mitchell, Harry Woods	Western	Columbia
Let 'Em Have It	Sam Wood	Richard Arlen, Virginia Bruce, Alice Brady	Crime	United Artists
Let's Live Tonight	Victor Schertzinger	Lilian Harvey, Tullio Carminati, Hugh Williams	Musical	Columbia
Life Begins at 40	George Marshall	Will Rogers, Rochelle Hudson, George Barbier	Comedy	Fox Film
Life Returns	Eugene Frenke	Onslow Stevens, Lois Wilson, Valerie Hobson	Drama, Science fiction	Universal
Lightning Triggers	S. Roy Luby	Reb Russell, Fred Kohler, Jack Rockwell	Western	Independent
Little Big Shot	Michael Curtiz	Robert Armstrong, Sybil Jason, Ward Bond	Comedy	Warner Bros.
The Little Colonel	David Butler	Shirley Temple, Lionel Barrymore, Hattie McDaniel	Comedy, Drama	Fox Film
The Littlest Rebel	David Butler	Shirley Temple, John Boles, Jack Holt	Drama	20th Century Fox
The Lives of a Bengal Lancer	Henry Hathaway	Gary Cooper, Franchot Tone, Richard Cromwell	Drama, Adventure	Paramount
The Live Wire	Harry S. Webb	Richard Talmadge, Alberta Vaughn, George Walsh	Adventure	Independent
Living on Velvet	Frank Borzage	George Brent, Kay Francis, Henry O'Neill	Drama, Romance	Warner Bros.
The Lone Wolf Returns	Roy William Neill	Melvyn Douglas, Gail Patrick, Tala Birell	Mystery	Columbia
Loser's End	Bernard B. Ray	Jack Perrin, Frank Rice, William Gould	Western	Independent
Lottery Lover	Wilhelm Thiele	Lew Ayres, Pat Paterson, Sterling Holloway	Comedy	Fox Film
Love in Bloom	Elliott Nugent	George Burns, Gracie Allen, Dixie Lee	Comedy, Romance	Paramount
Love Me Forever	Victor Schertzinger	Grace Moore, Leo Carrillo, Spring Byington	Drama, Musical	Columbia

== M–N ==
Title	Director	Featured cast	Genre	Note
Mad Love	Karl Freund	Peter Lorre, Frances Drake, Colin Clive	Drama, Horror	MGM
Magnificent Obsession	John M. Stahl	Robert Taylor, Irene Dunne, Ralph Morgan	Drama, Romance	Universal
Make a Million	Lewis D. Collins	Charles Starrett, George E. Stone, James Burke	Comedy	Monogram
Man of Iron	William C. McGann	Barton MacLane, Mary Astor, Dorothy Peterson	Drama	Warner Bros.
Man on the Flying Trapeze	Clyde Bruckman, W. C. Fields	W. C. Fields, Kathleen Howard, Mary Brian	Comedy	Paramount
The Man from Guntown	Ford Beebe	Tim McCoy, Billie Seward, Wheeler Oakman	Western	Independent
The Man Who Broke the Bank at Monte Carlo	Stephen Roberts	Ronald Colman, Joan Bennett, Colin Clive	Comedy	20th Century Fox
Manhattan Butterfly	Lewis D. Collins	Dorothy Granger, William Bakewell, Kenneth Thomson	Crime	Independent
Manhattan Moon	Stuart Walker	Ricardo Cortez, Dorothy Page, Hugh O'Connell	Comedy, Musical	Universal
Mark of the Vampire	Tod Browning	Bela Lugosi, Lionel Barrymore, Elizabeth Allan	Mystery, Horror	MGM
The Marriage Bargain	Albert Ray	Lila Lee, Lon Chaney Jr., Edmund Breese	Drama	Independent
Mary Burns, Fugitive	William K. Howard	Sylvia Sidney, Melvyn Douglas, Alan Baxter	Drama	Paramount
Mary Jane's Pa	William Keighley	Aline MacMahon, Guy Kibbee, Tom Brown	Drama	Warner Bros.
Maybe It's Love	William C. McGann	Gloria Stuart, Ross Alexander, Ruth Donnelly	Comedy, Romance	Warner Bros.
McFadden's Flats	Ralph Murphy	Walter C. Kelly, Andy Clyde, Richard Cromwell	Comedy	Paramount
The Melody Lingers On	David Burton	Josephine Hutchinson, Mona Barrie, George Houston	Musical	United Artists
Melody Trail	Joseph Kane	Gene Autry, Ann Rutherford, Smiley Burnette	Western	Republic
Men of Action	Alan James	Frankie Darro, Edwin Maxwell, Fred Kohler	Drama, Action	Independent
Men of the Hour	Lambert Hillyer	Richard Cromwell, Billie Seward, Wallace Ford	Mystery	Columbia
Men Without Names	Ralph Murphy	Fred MacMurray, Madge Evans, J. C. Nugent	Drama, Crime	Paramount
Metropolitan	Richard Boleslawski	Lawrence Tibbett, Alice Brady, Virginia Bruce	Drama, Musical	20th Century Fox
Midnight Phantom	Bernard B. Ray	Reginald Denny, Claudia Dell, Lloyd Hughes	Drama, Crime	Independent
A Midsummer Night's Dream	William Dieterle, Max Reinhardt	Olivia de Havilland, James Cagney, Mickey Rooney	Comedy, Fantasy	Warner Bros.
Million Dollar Haul	Albert Herman	Reed Howes, Janet Chandler, William Farnum	Mystery	Independent
Millions in the Air	Ray McCarey	John Howard, Wendy Barrie, Eleanore Whitney	Comedy	Paramount
Les Misérables	Richard Boleslawski	Charles Laughton, Fredric March, Rochelle Hudson	Drama, Romance	United Artists
Miss Pacific Fleet	Ray Enright	Joan Blondell, Glenda Farrell, Hugh Herbert	Comedy	Warner Bros.
Mississippi	Wesley Ruggles	Bing Crosby, Joan Bennett, W. C. Fields	Comedy, Musical	Paramount
Mister Dynamite	Alan Crosland	Edmund Lowe, Matt McHugh, Esther Ralston	Drama, Crime	Universal
Moonlight on the Prairie	D. Ross Lederman	Dick Foran, Sheila Bromley, George E. Stone	Western musical	Warner Bros.
Motive for Revenge	Burt P. Lynwood	Donald Cook, Irene Hervey, Doris Lloyd	Mystery	Majestic
Murder by Television	Clifford Sanforth	Bela Lugosi, June Collyer, Huntley Gordon	Mystery	Independent
Murder in Harlem	Oscar Micheaux	Clarence Brooks, Dorothy Van Engle, Alice B. Russell	Drama, Mystery	Micheaux Pictures
Murder in the Fleet	Edward Sedgwick	Robert Taylor, Arthur Byron, Una Merkel	Comedy, Drama	MGM
The Murder Man	Tim Whelan	Spencer Tracy, Virginia Bruce, William Demarest	Drama, Crime	MGM
Murder on a Honeymoon	Lloyd Corrigan	Edna May Oliver, Leo G. Carroll, Lola Lane	Comedy, Mystery	RKO
Music Is Magic	George Marshall	Alice Faye, Bebe Daniels, Ray Walker	Musical	Fox Film
Mutiny Ahead	Thomas Atkins	Neil Hamilton, Kathleen Burke, Leon Ames	Adventure	Majestic
Mutiny on the Bounty	Frank Lloyd	Charles Laughton, Clark Gable, Franchot Tone	Drama, Adventure	MGM
The Mystery of Edwin Drood	Stuart Walker	Claude Rains, Douglass Montgomery, E. E. Clive	Drama, Mystery	Universal
The Mystery Man	Ray McCarey	Robert Armstrong, Maxine Doyle, Henry Kolker	Crime	Monogram
Mystery Woman	Eugene Forde	Mona Barrie, Gilbert Roland, John Halliday	Thriller	Fox Film
Naughty Marietta	Robert Z. Leonard	Jeanette MacDonald, Nelson Eddy, Elsa Lanchester	Drama, Musical	MGM
Navy Wife	Allan Dwan	Claire Trevor, Ralph Bellamy, Jane Darwell	Drama	Fox Film
Nevada	Charles Barton	Buster Crabbe, Kathleen Burke, Monte Blue	Western	Paramount
Never Too Late	Bernard B. Ray	Richard Talmadge, Thelma White, Robert Frazer	Crime	Independent
The New Frontier	Carl Pierson	John Wayne, Muriel Evans, Warner Richmond	Western	Republic
A Night at the Opera	Sam Wood, Edmund Goulding	Marx Brothers, Kitty Carlisle, Allan Jones	Comedy, Musical	MGM
A Night at the Ritz	William C. McGann	William Gargan, Patricia Ellis, Allen Jenkins	Comedy	Warner Bros.
The Night Is Young	Dudley Murphy	Ramon Novarro, Evelyn Laye, Edward Everett Horton	Musical	MGM
Night Life of the Gods	Lowell Sherman	Alan Mowbray, Gilbert Emery, Henry Armetta	Comedy, Fantasy	Universal
The Nitwits	George Stevens	Bert Wheeler, Robert Woolsey, Betty Grable	Comedy	RKO
No Man's Range	Robert N. Bradbury	Bob Steele, Roberta Gale, Buck Connors	Western	Independent
No More Ladies	Edward H. Griffith, George Cukor	Joan Crawford, Robert Montgomery, Joan Fontaine	Comedy, Romance	MGM
North of Arizona	Harry S. Webb	Jack Perrin, Blanche Mehaffey, Lane Chandler	Western	Independent
Northern Frontier	Sam Newfield	Kermit Maynard, Eleanor Hunt, Russell Hopton	Western	Independent
A Notorious Gentleman	Edward Laemmle	Charles Bickford, Helen Vinson, Onslow Stevens	Drama	Universal
Now or Never	Bernard B. Ray	Richard Talmadge, Janet Chandler, Robert Walker	Crime	Independent
The Nut Farm	Melville W. Brown	Oscar Apfel, Wallace Ford, Florence Roberts	Comedy	Monogram

== O–Q ==
Title	Director	Featured cast	Genre	Note
O'Shaughnessy's Boy	Richard Boleslawski	Wallace Beery, Leona Maricle, Jackie Cooper	Drama	MGM
Oil for the Lamps of China	Mervyn LeRoy	Pat O'Brien, Josephine Hutchinson, Jean Muir	Drama	Warner Bros.
The Old Homestead	William Nigh	Mary Carlisle, Lawrence Gray, Dorothy Lee	Romance	Liberty
Old Man Rhythm	Edward Ludwig	Charles "Buddy" Rogers, George Barbier, Barbara Kent, Grace Bradley	Musical	RKO
On Probation	Charles Hutchison	Monte Blue, Lucile Browne, Barbara Bedford	Drama	Independent
Once in a Blue Moon	Ben Hecht, Charles MacArthur	Jimmy Savo, Cecilia Loftus, George Mitchell	Comedy drama	Paramount
One Frightened Night	Christy Cabanne	Lucien Littlefield, Mary Carlisle, Regis Toomey	Comedy horror	Mascot
One More Spring	Henry King	Janet Gaynor, Warner Baxter, Jane Darwell	Comedy drama	Fox Film
One New York Night	Jack Conway	Franchot Tone, Una Merkel, Conrad Nagel	Comedy	MGM
One Way Ticket	Herbert J. Biberman	Lloyd Nolan, Walter Connolly, Peggy Conklin	Drama	Columbia
Orchids to You	William A. Seiter	John Boles, Jean Muir, Charles Butterworth	Drama	Fox Film
Our Little Girl	John S. Robertson	Shirley Temple, Rosemary Ames, Joel McCrea	Drama	Fox Film
Outlaw Rule	S. Roy Luby	Reb Russell, Betty Mack, Al Bridge	Western	Independent
The Outlaw Deputy	Otto Brower	Tim McCoy, Nora Lane, Hooper Atchley	Western	Independent
The Outlaw Tamer	J.P. McGowan	Lane Chandler, Blanche Mehaffey, George 'Gabby' Hayes	Western	Independent
Outlawed Guns	Ray Taylor	Buck Jones, Roy D'Arcy, Joseph W. Girard	Western	Universal
The Pace That Kills	William A. O'Connor	Sheila Bromley, Lois January, Charles Delaney	Drama	Independent
Page Miss Glory	Mervyn LeRoy	Marion Davies, Pat O'Brien, Dick Powell	Romantic comedy	Warner Bros.
Pals of the Range	Elmer Clifton	Rex Lease, Frances Morris, Yakima Canutt	Western	Independent
Paradise Canyon	Carl Pierson	John Wayne, Marion Burns, Reed Howes	Western	Monogram
Paris in Spring	Lewis Milestone	Mary Ellis, Tullio Carminati, Ida Lupino	Comedy	Paramount
Party Wire	Erle C. Kenton	Jean Arthur, Victor Jory, Charley Grapewin	Comedy	Columbia
The Payoff	Robert Florey	James Dunn, Claire Dodd, Patricia Ellis	Drama	Warner Bros.
The Pecos Kid	Harry L. Fraser	Fred Kohler, Ruth Findlay, Roger Williams	Western	Independent
People Will Talk	Alfred Santell	Charles Ruggles, Mary Boland, Leila Hyams	Comedy	Paramount
The People's Enemy	Crane Wilbur	Melvyn Douglas, Preston Foster, Lila Lee	Drama, Crime	RKO
The Perfect Clue	Robert G. Vignola	David Manners, Betty Blythe, Richard "Skeets" Gallagher	Comedy crime	Majestic
The Perfect Gentleman	Tim Whelan	Frank Morgan, Cicely Courtneidge, Heather Angel	Comedy	MGM
Personal Maid's Secret	Arthur Greville Collins	Margaret Lindsay, Warren Hull, Anita Louise	Comedy	Warner Bros.
Peter Ibbetson	Henry Hathaway	Gary Cooper, Ann Harding, Ida Lupino	Drama	Paramount
The Phantom Cowboy	Robert J. Horner	Ted Wells, George Chesebro, Jimmy Aubrey	Western	Independent
Powdersmoke Range	Wallace Fox	Harry Carey, Hoot Gibson, Bob Steele	Western	RKO
Princess O'Hara	David Burton	Jean Parker, Chester Morris, Leon Errol	Comedy	Universal
Private Worlds	Gregory La Cava	Claudette Colbert, Joel McCrea, Charles Boyer	Drama	Paramount
Professional Soldier	Tay Garnett	Victor McLaglen, Freddie Bartholomew, Gloria Stuart	Drama, Adventure	20th Century Fox
Public Hero No. 1	J. Walter Ruben	Jean Arthur, Lionel Barrymore, Joseph Calleia	Drama, Crime	MGM
The Public Menace	Erle C. Kenton	Jean Arthur, George Murphy, Douglass Dumbrille	Drama	Columbia
Public Opinion	Frank R. Strayer	Lois Wilson, Shirley Grey, Crane Wilbur	Drama	Chesterfield
Pursuit	Edwin L. Marin	Chester Morris, Sally Eilers, Scotty Beckett	Action	MGM

== R–S ==
Title	Director	Featured cast	Genre	Note
Racing Luck	Sam Newfield	William Boyd, Barbara Worth, Esther Muir	Action	Republic
Rainbow's End	Norval Spencer	Hoot Gibson, Oscar Apfel, June Gale	Western	Independent
Rainbow Valley	Robert N. Bradbury	John Wayne, Lucile Browne, LeRoy Mason	Western	Monogram
The Rainmakers	Fred Guiol	Bert Wheeler, Robert Woolsey, Dorothy Lee	Comedy	RKO
The Raven	Lew Landers	Bela Lugosi, Boris Karloff, Irene Ware	Drama, Horror	Universal
Reckless	Victor Fleming	Jean Harlow, William Powell, Rosalind Russell	Comedy, Musical	MGM
The Reckless Buckaroo	Harry L. Fraser	Bill Cody, Betty Mack, Roger Williams	Western	Independent
Reckless Roads	Burt P. Lynwood	Judith Allen, Regis Toomey, Lloyd Hughes	Drama	Majestic
The Red Blood of Courage	John English	Kermit Maynard, Ann Sheridan, Reginald Barlow	Western	Independent
Red Hot Tires	D. Ross Lederman	Lyle Talbot, Mary Astor, Roscoe Karns	Crime	Warner Bros.
Red Salute	Sidney Lanfield	Barbara Stanwyck, Robert Young, Purnell Pratt	Comedy	United Artists
Redheads on Parade	Norman Z. McLeod	John Boles, Dixie Lee, Raymond Walburn	Musical	Fox Film
Remember Last Night?	James Whale	Constance Cummings, Robert Young, Edward Arnold	Comedy, Mystery	Universal
Rendezvous	Sam Wood	William Powell, Rosalind Russell, Cesar Romero	Comedy thriller	MGM
Rendezvous at Midnight	Christy Cabanne	Ralph Bellamy, Valerie Hobson, Irene Ware	Mystery	Universal
Rescue Squad	Spencer Gordon Bennet	Ralph Forbes, Verna Hillie, Leon Ames	Crime	Independent
The Return of Peter Grimm	George Nicholls Jr.	Lionel Barrymore, Helen Mack, Edward Ellis, Donald Meek	Drama	RKO
The Revenge Rider	David Selman	Tim McCoy, Billie Seward, Robert Allen	Western	Columbia
The Rider of the Law	Robert N. Bradbury	Bob Steele, Gertrude Messinger, Lloyd Ingraham	Western	Independent
Riddle Ranch	Charles Hutchison	June Marlowe, Julian Rivero, Richard Cramer	Western	Independent
Riding Wild	David Selman	Tim McCoy, Billie Seward, Niles Welch	Western	Columbia
Rio Rattler	Bernard B. Ray	Tom Tyler, Marion Shilling, Eddie Gribbon	Western	Independent
The Right to Live	William Keighley	Josephine Hutchinson, George Brent, Peggy Wood	Drama	Warner Bros.
Rip Roaring Riley	Elmer Clifton	Lloyd Hughes, Marion Burns, Grant Withers	Action	Independent
Roaring Roads	Ray Nazarro	David Sharpe, Gertrude Messinger, Mary Kornman	Action	Independent
Roberta	William A. Seiter	Irene Dunne, Fred Astaire, Ginger Rogers	Musical	RKO
Rocky Mountain Mystery	Charles Barton	Randolph Scott, Ann Sheridan, Kathleen Burke	Western	Paramount
Romance in Manhattan	Stephen Roberts	Ginger Rogers, Francis Lederer, Jimmy Butler	Comedy drama	RKO
Rough Riding Ranger	Elmer Clifton	Rex Lease, Janet Chandler, Yakima Canutt	Comedy	Independent
Ruggles of Red Gap	Leo McCarey	Charles Laughton, Roland Young, ZaSu Pitts	Comedy	Paramount
Rumba	Marion Gering	George Raft, Carole Lombard, Gail Patrick	Musical	Paramount
Rustler's Paradise	Harry L. Fraser	Harry Carey, Slim Whitaker, Gertrude Messinger	Western	Independent
Saddle Aces	Harry L. Fraser	Rex Bell, Ruth Mix, Stanley Blystone	Western	Independent
The Sagebrush Troubadour	Joseph Kane	Gene Autry, Barbara Pepper, Smiley Burnette	Western	Republic
The Scoundrel	Ben Hecht, Charles MacArthur	Noël Coward, Martha Sleeper, Alexander Woollcott	Comedy, Drama	Paramount
Secrets of Chinatown	Fred C. Newmeyer	Nick Stuart, Lucile Browne, James Flavin	Mystery	Independent
Seven Keys to Baldpate	William Hamilton	Gene Raymond, Eric Blore, Grant Mitchell	Comedy	RKO
Shadow of Doubt	George B. Seitz	Ricardo Cortez, Virginia Bruce, Isabel Jewell	Mystery	MGM
The Shadow of Silk Lennox	Jack Nelson	Lon Chaney Jr., Jack Mulhall, Eddie Gribbon	Crime	Independent
Shadows of the Orient	Burt P. Lynwood	Esther Ralston, Regis Toomey, J. Farrell MacDonald	Crime	Monogram
Shanghai	James Flood	Loretta Young, Charles Boyer, Warner Oland	Drama	Paramount
She	Irving Pichel	Helen Gahagan, Randolph Scott, Nigel Bruce	Adventure	RKO
She Couldn't Take It	Tay Garnett	Joan Bennett, Walter Connolly, Wallace Ford	Comedy	Columbia
She Gets Her Man	William Nigh	Ward Bond, ZaSu Pitts, Lucien Littlefield	Comedy, Crime	Universal
She Married Her Boss	Gregory La Cava	Claudette Colbert, Melvyn Douglas, Raymond Walburn	Comedy	Columbia
Ship Cafe	Robert Florey	Carl Brisson, Arline Judge, Mady Christians	Musical	Paramount
Shipmates Forever	Frank Borzage	Dick Powell, Ruby Keeler, Lewis Stone	Musical	Warner Bros.
A Shot in the Dark	Charles Lamont	Charles Starrett, Marion Shilling	Mystery	Chesterfield
Show Them No Mercy!	George Marshall	Rochelle Hudson, Cesar Romero, Bruce Cabot	Crime	20th Century Fox
The Silent Code	Stuart Paton	Kane Richmond, Blanche Mehaffey, Barney Furey	Western	Independent
Silent Valley	Bernard B. Ray	Tom Tyler, Al Bridge, Charles King	Western	Independent
Silk Hat Kid	H. Bruce Humberstone	Lew Ayres, Mae Clarke, Paul Kelly	Crime	Fox Film
The Silver Bullet	Bernard B. Ray	Tom Tyler, Jayne Regan, Lafe McKee	Western	Independent
The Singing Vagabond	Carl Pierson	Gene Autry, Ann Rutherford, Barbara Pepper	Western	Republic
Six Gun Justice	Robert F. Hill	Bill Cody, Donald Reed, Hal Taliaferro	Western	Independent
Skull and Crown	Elmer Clifton	Regis Toomey, Jack Mulhall, Molly O'Day	Western	Independent
Skybound	Raymond K. Johnson	Lloyd Hughes, Edward J. Nugent, Lona Andre	Action	Independent
Smart Girl	Aubrey Scotto	Ida Lupino, Kent Taylor, Joseph Cawthorn	Comedy Drama	Paramount
Smokey Smith	Robert N. Bradbury	Bob Steele, George 'Gabby' Hayes, Mary Kornman	Western	Independent
So Red the Rose	King Vidor	Walter Connolly, Margaret Sullavan, Randolph Scott	Drama	Paramount
Social Error	Harry L. Fraser	David Sharpe, Gertrude Messinger, Monte Blue	Crime	Independent
Society Doctor	George B. Seitz	Chester Morris, Robert Taylor, Virginia Bruce	Drama	MGM
Society Fever	Frank R. Strayer	Lois Wilson, Guinn Williams, Hedda Hopper	Comedy	Chesterfield
The Spanish Cape Mystery	Lewis D. Collins	Donald Cook, Helen Twelvetrees, Berton Churchill	Mystery	Republic
Special Agent	William Keighley	Bette Davis, Ricardo Cortez, George Brent	Crime drama	Warner Bros.
Speed Devils	Joseph Henabery	Paul Kelly, Marguerite Churchill, Russell Hardie	Action	Independent
Speed Limited	Albert Herman	Ralph Graves, Evelyn Brent, Claudia Dell	Crime	Independent
Splendor	Elliott Nugent	Miriam Hopkins, Joel McCrea, Helen Westley	Comedy drama	United Artists
Spring Tonic	Clyde Bruckman	Lew Ayres, Claire Trevor, Jack Haley	Comedy	Fox Film
Square Shooter	David Selman	Tim McCoy, Jacqueline Wells, John Darrow	Western	Columbia
Star of Midnight	Stephen Roberts	William Powell, Ginger Rogers, Gene Lockhart	Comedy mystery	RKO
Stars over Broadway	William Keighley	Pat O'Brien, James Melton, Jane Froman	Comedy musical	Warner Bros.
Steamboat Round the Bend	John Ford	Will Rogers, Anne Shirley, Eugene Pallette	Comedy	Fox Film
Stolen Harmony	Alfred L. Werker	George Raft, Ben Bernie, Lloyd Nolan	Comedy musical	Paramount
Stone of Silver Creek	Nick Grinde	Buck Jones, Noel Francis, Marion Shilling	Western	Universal
Storm Over the Andes	Christy Cabanne	Gene Lockhart, Jack Holt, Antonio Moreno	Adventure	Universal
Stormy	Lew Landers	Noah Beery Jr., Fred Kohler, J. Farrell MacDonald	Western	Universal
Straight from the Heart	Scott R. Beal	Mary Astor, Roger Pryor, Juanita Quigley	Drama	Universal
Stranded	Frank Borzage	George Brent, Kay Francis, Robert Barrat	Drama	Warner Bros.
Strangers All	Charles Vidor	May Robson, Preston Foster, Florine McKinney	Drama	RKO
Streamline Express	Leonard Fields	Victor Jory, Esther Ralston, Evelyn Venable	Comedy	Mascot
Suicide Squad	Raymond K. Johnson	Norman Foster, Joyce Compton, Robert Homans	Action	Independent
Sundown Saunders	Robert N. Bradbury	Bob Steele, Earl Dwire, Jack Rockwell	Western	Independent
Sunset Range	Ray McCarey	Hoot Gibson, Mary Doran, Walter McGrail	Western	Independent
Super-Speed	Lambert Hillyer	Norman Foster, Florence Rice, Mary Carlisle	Sci-Fi	Columbia
Sweepstake Annie	William Nigh	Marian Nixon, Tom Brown, Wera Engels	Comedy	Liberty
Sweet Music	Alfred E. Green	Rudy Vallée, Ann Dvorak, Helen Morgan	Musical	Warner Bros.
Sweet Surrender	Monte Brice	Frank Parker, Tamara Drasin, Russ Brown	Musical	Universal
Swellhead	Benjamin Stoloff	Wallace Ford, Barbara Kent, Dickie Moore	Sports	Columbia
Swifty	Alan James	Hoot Gibson, June Gale, George 'Gabby' Hayes	Western	Independent
Sylvia Scarlett	George Cukor	Katharine Hepburn, Cary Grant, Edmund Gwenn	Comedy	RKO
Symphony of Living	Frank R. Strayer	Evelyn Brent, Al Shean, Charles Judels	Drama	Chesterfield

== T–U ==
Title	Director	Featured cast	Genre	Note
A Tale of Two Cities	Jack Conway	Ronald Colman, Edna May Oliver, Basil Rathbone	Drama	MGM
The Test	Bernard B. Ray	Grant Withers, Monte Blue, Lafe McKee	Adventure	Independent
Texas Jack	Bernard B. Ray	Jack Perrin, Jayne Regan, Nelson McDowell	Western	Independent
The Texas Rambler	Robert F. Hill	Bill Cody, Earle Hodgins, Roger Williams	Western	Independent
Texas Terror	Robert N. Bradbury	John Wayne, Lucile Brown, LeRoy Mason	Western	Monogram
Thanks a Million	Roy Del Ruth	Dick Powell, Raymond Walburn, Patsy Kelly	Comedy, Musical	20th Century Fox
This Is the Life	Marshall Neilan	Jane Withers, Sally Blane, John McGuire	Comedy	Fox Film
Three Kids and a Queen	Edward Ludwig	May Robson, Henry Armetta, Frankie Darro	Drama	Universal
The Three Musketeers	Rowland V. Lee	Paul Lukas, Walter Abel, Heather Angel	Adventure, Action	RKO
The Throwback	Ray Taylor	Buck Jones, Muriel Evans, Bryant Washburn	Western	Universal
Thunder in the Night	George Archainbaud	Edmund Lowe, Karen Morley, Paul Cavanagh	Crime	Fox Film
Thunder Mountain	David Howard	George O'Brien, Frances Grant, Morgan Wallace	Western	Fox Film
The Tia Juana Kid	Jack Nelson	Movita Castaneda, Milburn Morante, Tom London	Western	Independent
Timber War	Sam Newfield	Kermit Maynard, Lucille Lund, Lawrence Gray	Western	Independent
Times Square Lady	George B. Seitz	Robert Taylor, Virginia Bruce, Pinky Tomlin	Romance, Musical	MGM
To Beat the Band	Benjamin Stoloff	Hugh Herbert, Roger Pryor, Helen Broderick	Comedy, Musical	RKO
Together We Live	Willard Mack	Ben Lyon, Esther Ralston, Sheila Bromley	Drama	Columbia
Toll of the Desert	William Berke	Fred Kohler, Betty Mack, Roger Williams	Western	Independent
Too Tough to Kill	D. Ross Lederman	Victor Jory, Sally O'Neil, Johnny Arthur	Drama	Columbia
Top Hat	Mark Sandrich	Fred Astaire, Ginger Rogers, Edward Everett Horton	Comedy, Musical	RKO
Tracy Rides	Harry S. Webb	Tom Tyler, Virginia Brown Faire, Edmund Cobb	Western	Independent
Trail of Terror	Robert N. Bradbury	Bob Steele, Beth Marion, Forrest Taylor	Western	Independent
Trails End	Albert Herman	Conway Tearle, Claudia Dell, Fred Kohler	Western	Independent
Trails of the Wild	Sam Newfield	Kermit Maynard, Billie Seward, Monte Blue	Western	Independent
Transient Lady	Edward Buzzell	Gene Raymond, Henry Hull, Frances Drake	Drama	Universal
Traveling Saleslady	Ray Enright	Joan Blondell, Glenda Farrell, William Gargan	Comedy	Warner Bros.
Trigger Tom	Harry S. Webb	Tom Tyler, William Gould, Bernadene Hayes	Western	Independent
Tumbling Tumbleweeds	Joseph Kane	Gene Autry, Smiley Burnette, Lucile Browne	Western	Republic
Two-Fisted	James Cruze	Lee Tracy, Gail Patrick, Roscoe Karns	Comedy	Paramount
Two for Tonight	Frank Tuttle	Bing Crosby, Joan Bennett, Mary Boland	Musical	Paramount
Two Sinners	Arthur Lubin	Otto Kruger, Martha Sleeper, Minna Gombell	Drama	Republic
Twenty Dollars a Week	Wesley Ford	James Murray, Dorothy Revier, William Worthington	Comedy drama	Independent
Unconquered Bandit	Harry S. Webb	Tom Tyler, William Gould, Slim Whitaker	Western	Independent
Under Pressure	Raoul Walsh	Edmund Lowe, Victor McLaglen, Charles Bickford	Drama	Fox Film
Under the Pampas Moon	James Tinling	Warner Baxter, Ketti Gallian, Jack La Rue	Western, Musical	Fox Film
Unknown Woman	Albert S. Rogell	Richard Cromwell, Marian Marsh, Henry Armetta	Crime	Columbia
The Unwelcome Stranger	Phil Rosen	Jack Holt, Mona Barrie, Ralph Morgan	Drama	Columbia

== V–Z ==
Title	Director	Featured cast	Genre	Note
Vagabond Lady	Sam Taylor	Robert Young, Evelyn Venable, Reginald Denny	Comedy	MGM
Valley of Wanted Men	Alan James	Frankie Darro, LeRoy Mason, Russell Hopton	Western	Independent
Vanessa: Her Love Story	William K. Howard	Helen Hayes, Robert Montgomery, Otto Kruger	Drama, Romance	MGM
The Vanishing Riders	Robert F. Hill	Bill Cody, Donald Reed, Roger Williams	Western	Independent
Village Tale	John Cromwell	Randolph Scott, Kay Johnson, Robert Barrat	Drama	RKO
The Virginia Judge	Edward Sedgwick	Marsha Hunt, Walter C. Kelly, Robert Cummings	Drama	Paramount
Wagon Trail	Harry L. Fraser	Harry Carey, Gertrude Messinger, Edward Norris	Western	Independent
Wanderer of the Wasteland	Otho Lovering	Dean Jagger, Gail Patrick, Edward Ellis	Western	Paramount
Waterfront Lady	Joseph Santley	Ann Rutherford, Frank Albertson, Ward Bond	Crime	Mascot
Way Down East	Henry King	Henry Fonda, Rochelle Hudson, Margaret Hamilton	Drama	Fox Film
The Wedding Night	King Vidor	Gary Cooper, Anna Sten, Helen Vinson	Drama	United Artists
Welcome Home	James Tinling	James Dunn, Arline Judge, Raymond Walburn	Comedy	Fox Film
We're in the Money	Ray Enright	Joan Blondell, Glenda Farrell, Hugh Herbert	Comedy	Warner Bros.
We're Only Human	James Flood	Preston Foster, Jane Wyatt, James Gleason	Drama	RKO
Werewolf of London	Stuart Walker	Henry Hull, Warner Oland, Valerie Hobson	Horror, Sci-fi	Universal
West Point of the Air	Richard Rosson	Robert Taylor, Wallace Beery, Rosalind Russell	Drama	MGM
Western Courage	Spencer Gordon Bennet	Ken Maynard, Geneva Mitchell, Betty Blythe	Western	Columbia
Western Frontier	Albert Herman	Ken Maynard, Lucile Browne, Nora Lane	Western	Columbia
Westward Ho	Robert N. Bradbury	John Wayne, Sheila Bromley, Hank Bell	Western	Republic
What Price Crime	Albert Herman	Charles Starrett, Virginia Cherrill, Noel Madison	Crime	Independent
When a Man's a Man	Edward F. Cline	George O'Brien, Dorothy Wilson, Harry Woods	Western	Fox Film
While the Patient Slept	Ray Enright	Aline MacMahon, Guy Kibbee, Allen Jenkins	Comedy	Warner Bros.
Whipsaw	James Wong Howe, Sam Wood	Spencer Tracy, Myrna Loy, John Qualen	Comedy, Drama	MGM
Whispering Smith Speaks	David Howard	George O'Brien, Irene Ware, Kenneth Thomson	Western	20th Century Fox
The White Cockatoo	Alan Crosland	Jean Muir, Ricardo Cortez, Ruth Donnelly	Mystery	Warner Bros.
White Lies	Leo Bulgakov	Victor Jory, Fay Wray, Walter Connolly	Drama	Columbia
The Whole Town's Talking	John Ford	Edward G. Robinson, Jean Arthur, Arthur Byron	Comedy	Columbia
Wild Mustang	Harry L. Fraser	Harry Carey, Bob Kortman, Dick Botiller	Western	Independent
Wilderness Mail	Forrest Sheldon	Kermit Maynard, Fred Kohler, Paul Hurst	Western	Independent
Wings in the Dark	James Flood	Cary Grant, Myrna Loy, Matt McHugh	Adventure drama	Paramount
The Winning Ticket	Charles Reisner	Leo Carrillo, Louise Fazenda, Irene Hervey	Comedy	MGM
Without Children	William Nigh	Marguerite Churchill, Bruce Cabot, Evelyn Brent	Drama	Liberty
Without Regret	Harold Young	Elissa Landi, Paul Cavanagh, Frances Drake	Drama	Paramount
Wolf Riders	Harry S. Webb	Jack Perrin, Lafe McKee, William Gould	Western	Independent
The Woman in Red	Robert Florey	Barbara Stanwyck, Genevieve Tobin, Gene Raymond	Drama	Warner Bros.
Woman Wanted	George B. Seitz	Maureen O'Sullivan, Joel McCrea, Louis Calhern	Drama	MGM
Women Must Dress	Reginald Barker	Minna Gombell, Lenita Lane, Suzanne Kaaren	Comedy	Monogram
Your Uncle Dudley	James Tinling	Edward Everett Horton, Lois Wilson, John McGuire	Comedy	20th Century Fox

== See also ==
- 1935 in the United States
