= Ghost Town (1936 film) =

1936 film by Harry L. Fraser

- Directed by: Harry L. Fraser
- Written by: Harry L. Fraser
- Produced by: William Berke
- Starring: Harry Carey; David Sharpe; Ruth Findlay
- Cinematography: Robert E. Cline
- Edited by: Arthur A. Brooks
- Music by: Lee Zahler
- Production company: William Berke Productions
- Distributed by: Commodore Pictures
- Release date: February 15, 1936
- Running time: 56 minutes
- Country: United States
- Language: English

Ghost Town is a 1936 American Western film directed by Harry L. Fraser and starring Harry Carey, David Sharpe and Ruth Findlay. It was produced by William Berke

== Plot ==
An old miner is attacked in an effort to rob him, but is rescued by a passing cowboy who is then wrongly blamed for the assault.

== Cast ==
- Harry Carey as Cheyenne Harry Morgan
- David Sharpe as Bud
- Ruth Findlay as Billie Blair
- Jane Novak as Rose - Gang Moll
- Lee Shumway as Boss Morrell
- Ed Cassidy as Sheriff Blair
- Roger Williams as Gannon - Henchman
- Phil Dunham as Abe Rankin
- Earl Dwire as Jim McCall
- Chuck Morrison as Blackie Hawkes - Henchman

== Bibliography ==
- Pitts, Michael R. Poverty Row Studios, 1929–1940: An Illustrated History of 55 Independent Film Companies, with a Filmography for Each. McFarland & Company, 2005.
