= Wildcat Saunders =

- Theatrical release poster
- Directed by: Harry L. Fraser
- Screenplay by: Harry L. Fraser
- Produced by: William Berke
- Starring: Jack Perrin; Blanche Mehaffey; William Gould; Fred Toones; Roger Williams; Tom London; Ed Cassidy
- Cinematography: Robert E. Cline
- Edited by: Arthur A. Brooks
- Production company: Berke-Perrin Productions
- Distributed by: Atlantic Pictures Corporation
- Release date: March 4, 1936
- Running time: 60 minutes
- Country: United States
- Language: English

Wildcat Saunders is a 1936 American Western film written and directed by Harry L. Fraser. The film stars Jack Perrin, Blanche Mehaffey, William Gould, Fred Toones, Roger Williams, Tom London and Ed Cassidy. The film was released on March 4, 1936, by Atlantic Pictures Corporation.

== Cast ==
- Jack Perrin as Wildcat Saunders
- Blanche Mehaffey as June Lawson
- William Gould as Joe Pipp
- Fred Toones as Snowflake
- Roger Williams as Laramie
- Tom London as Pete Hawkins
- Ed Cassidy as Dad Lawson
