= Lawless Valley =

Lawless Valley may refer to:

- Lawless Valley (1938 film), an American Western film
- Lawless Valley (1932 film), an American Western film
