= Desert Justice =

1936 film

- Directed by: William Berke
- Written by: Gordon Phillips; Lewis Kingdon; Allen Hall
- Produced by: William Berke; Jack Perrin
- Starring: Jack Perrin; Warren Hymer; David Sharpe
- Cinematography: Robert E. Cline
- Edited by: Arthur A. Brooks
- Music by: Lee Zahler
- Production company: Berke-Perrin Productions
- Distributed by: Atlantic Pictures
- Release date: April 26, 1936
- Running time: 58 minutes
- Country: United States
- Language: English

Desert Justice is a 1936 American western film directed by William Berke and starring Jack Perrin, Warren Hymer and David Sharpe.

== Plot ==
When the police commissioner orders all police horses to be sold off, officer Jack Rankin is disappointed but his beloved Starlight is bought for him by a woman whose life he has saved. Soon afterwards a bank robbery is carried out by a gang headed by Jack's younger brother Dave.

== Cast ==
- Jack Perrin as Jack Rankin
- Warren Hymer as Hymie
- Marion Dowling as Ellen Hansen
- David Sharpe as Dave Rankin
- Roger Williams as Rod
- William Gould as Hugo Cohn Auctioneer
- Fred 'Snowflake' Toones as Snowflake - Bank Janitor
- Dennis Moore as Motorcycle Officer
- Budd Buster as Rod's Henchman
- Earl Dwire as Hansen Police Commissioner
- Tex Palmer as Posseman
- Braveheart as Braveheart - Ellen's Dog
- Starlight the Horse as Starlight Jack's Horse

== Bibliography ==
- Pitts, Michael R. Poverty Row Studios, 1929–1940. McFarland & Company, 2005.
