= Barney Beasley =

American actor

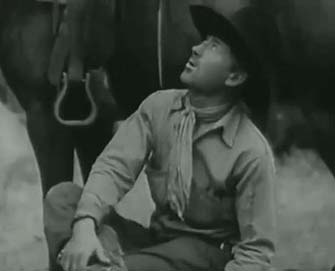
- Screen capture of Beasley as Henchman Perez in the 1935 film, Toll of the Desert
- Born: June 20, 1895; Blaine Bottom, Oklahoma, United States
- Died: June 1, 1951 (aged 55); Los Angeles, California, United States
- Occupation: Actor
- Years active: 1930–44

Barney Beasley (June 20, 1895 – June 1, 1951) was an American character actor of the 1930s and 1940s.

== Biography ==
Born on June 20, 1895, in the small town of Blaine Bottom, Oklahoma, Beasley made his debut in films in 1930's Under Montana Skies, in a small un-credited role of a townsman. Almost all of his roles were small and un-credited, many of them nameless, with three of his most numerous being that of a townsman, barfly or henchman. Occasionally, he would be given a slightly larger role, as of that of Pete in 1935's Gun Play. His final performance was as a barfly in the 1944 film, The Last Horseman. Beasley died on June 1, 1951, in Los Angeles, California, and was buried in the Fort Rosecrans National Cemetery in San Diego, California.

== Partial filmography ==
- Under Montana Skies (1930)
- Beyond the Rio Grande (1930)
- Code of Honor (1930)
- Desert Vengeance (1931)
- Frontier Days (1934)
- Big Calibre (1935)
- Toll of the Desert (1935)
- Rustler's Paradise (1935)
- The Last of the Clintons (1935)
- Gun Play (1935)
- Wagon Trail (1935)
- The Last Horseman (1944)
