= Riders of the Desert =

1932 film

- Theatrical release poster
- Directed by: Robert North Bradbury
- Screenplay by: Wellyn Totman
- Produced by: Trem Carr
- Starring: Bob Steele; Gertrude Messinger; Al St. John; George "Gabby" Hayes; John Elliott; Horace B. Carpenter
- Cinematography: Archie Stout
- Edited by: Carl Pierson
- Production company: Trem Carr Pictures
- Distributed by: Sono Art-World Wide Pictures
- Release date: April 24, 1932
- Running time: 59 minutes
- Country: United States
- Language: English

Riders of the Desert is a 1932 American Western film directed by Robert North Bradbury and written by Wellyn Totman. The film stars Bob Steele, Gertrude Messinger, Al St. John, George "Gabby" Hayes, John Elliott and Horace B. Carpenter. The film was released on April 24, 1932, by Sono Art-World Wide Pictures.

== Cast ==
- Bob Steele as Bob Houston
- Gertrude Messinger as Barbara Reynolds
- Al St. John as Slim
- George "Gabby" Hayes as Hashknife Brooks
- John Elliott as Houston
- Horace B. Carpenter as Capt. Jim Reynolds
- Joe Dominguez as Gomez
- Greg Whitespear as Apache Joe
- Louise Carver as Buck Lawlor
- Tex O'Neill as Cochimo
