= The Irish Gringo =

1935 Western film

- DVD cover
- Directed by: William C. Thompson
- Written by: Pat Carlyle
- Starring: Pat Carlyle, William Farnum and Karlyn May
- Cinematography: Bert Longenecker
- Music by: Manuela Budrow
- Production company: Keith Productions
- Release date: December 1, 1935
- Running time: 54 minutes
- Country: United States
- Language: English

The Irish Gringo is a 1935 American western film directed by William C. Thompson and starring Pat Carlyle, William Farnum and Karlyn May.

== Plot ==
A half-Mexican, half-Irish "gringo" encounters a girl wandering the desert. Her grandfather was killed by a gang of outlaws looking for a Dutch mine. The girl has a map of the mine drawn on her shirt, and the outlaws are looking to find it.

== Cast ==
- Pat Carlyle as Don O'Brien, The Irish Gringo
- William Farnum as Pop Wiley
- Karlyn May as Anita
- Bryant Washburn as Malone
- Elena Durán as Carlotta
- Olin Francis as Rawlins - Henchman
- Milburn Morante as Buffalo
- Don Orlando as Pancho
- Ace Cain as Ace Lewis
- Rudolf Cornell as Jimmy Melton
- Marjorie Medford as Sally Wiley
- Fox O'Callahan as Henchman

== Reception ==
The film has been described as "One of the more jaw-slackening excretions of the time".
