= Arthur A. Brooks =

American film editor

- Born: August 1, 1906; Dayton, Ohio, United States
- Died: March 1982 (aged 75); Baltimore, Maryland, United States
- Occupation: Editor
- Years active: 1929–1949 (film)

Arthur A. Brooks (August 1, 1906 – March, 1982) was an American film editor. He worked in Hollywood for a variety of independent companies.

== Selected filmography ==
- Code of the West (1929)
- The Last Round-Up (1929)
- The Phantom Rider (1929)
- Pioneers of the West (1929)
- The Oklahoma Kid (1929)
- The Lone Horseman (1929)
- Under Texas Skies (1930)
- Breezy Bill (1930)
- Call of the Desert (1930)
- The Canyon of Missing Men (1930)
- Beyond the Law (1930)
- Code of Honor (1930)
- Primrose Path (1931)
- Wild West Whoopee (1931)
- A Story of the South Seas (1931)
- Secret Menace (1931)
- The Man from Death Valley (1931)
- Lawless Valley (1932)
- The Pecos Kid (1935)
- Roaring Roads (1935)
- Rustler's Paradise (1935)
- Adventurous Knights (1935)
- Toll of the Desert (1935)
- The Last of the Clintons (1935)
- Social Error (1935)
- Wagon Trail (1935)
- Wild Mustang (1935)
- The Ghost Rider (1935)
- Suicide Squad (1935)
- Aces Wild (1936)
- Doughnuts and Society (1936)
- Fury Below (1936)
- Wildcat Saunders (1936)
- Ghost Town (1936)
- Cavalcade of the West (1936)
- Hair-Trigger Casey (1936)
- Romance Rides the Range (1936)
- Desert Justice (1936)
- Gun Grit (1936)
- The Fighting Deputy (1937)
- Melody of the Plains (1937)
- Moonlight on the Range (1937)
- Dark Manhattan (1937)
- The Roaming Cowboy (1937)
- The Singing Buckaroo (1937)
- Heroes of the Alamo (1937)
- Songs and Saddles (1938)
- The Duke Is Tops (1938)
- Rolling Home (1946)
- Renegade Girl (1946)
- The Hat Box Mystery (1947)
- Shoot to Kill (1947)
- An Old-Fashioned Girl (1949)
- Shamrock Hill (1949)

== Bibliography ==
- Pitts, Michael R. Poverty Row Studios, 1929–1940: An Illustrated History of 55 Independent Film Companies, with a Filmography for Each. McFarland & Company, 2005.
