= Aces Wild =

1936 film

- Theatrical poster
- Directed by: Harry L. Fraser
- Written by: Harry L. Fraser
- Produced by: William Berke
- Starring: Harry Carey; Gertrude Messinger; Theodore Lorch
- Cinematography: Robert E. Cline
- Edited by: Arthur A. Brooks
- Production company: William Berke Productions
- Distributed by: Commodore Pictures
- Release date: January 2, 1936
- Running time: 57 minutes
- Country: United States
- Language: English

Aces Wild is a 1936 American Western film directed by Harry L. Fraser and starring Harry Carey, Gertrude Messinger and Theodore Lorch.

== Cast ==
- Harry Carey as Cheyenne Harry Morgan
- Gertrude Messinger as Martha Worth
- Theodore Lorch as Kelton
- Roger Williams as Slim - Henchman
- Chuck Morrison as Hank - Henchman
- Phil Dunham as Anson - Editor
- Fred 'Snowflake' Toones as Snowflake

== Bibliography ==
- Pitts, Michael R. Poverty Row Studios, 1929–1940: An Illustrated History of 55 Independent Film Companies, with a Filmography for Each. McFarland & Company, 2005.
