= The Fatal Glass of Beer (1933 film) =

1933 film

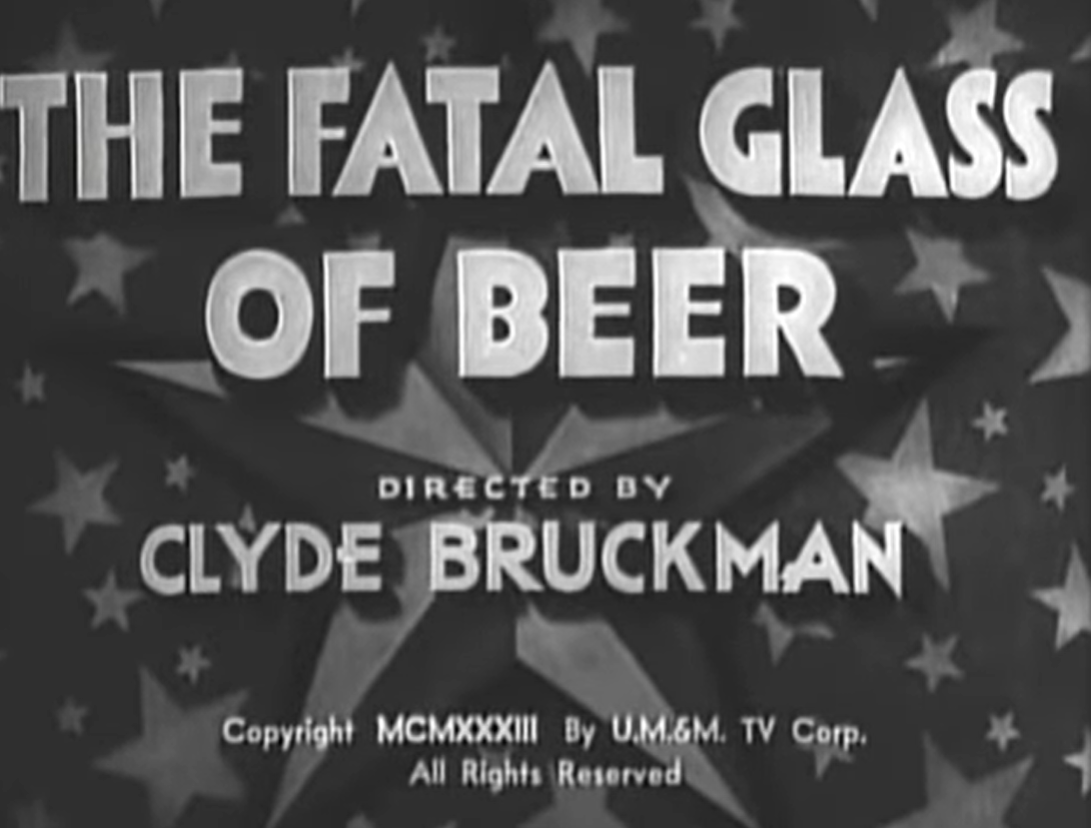
- Title card
- Directed by: Clyde Bruckman
- Written by: W. C. Fields
- Produced by: Mack Sennett
- Starring: W. C. Fields
- Production company: Mack Sennett Productions
- Distributed by: Paramount Pictures
- Release date: March 3, 1933
- Running time: 21 minutes
- Country: United States
- Language: English

The Fatal Glass of Beer is a 1933 American pre-Code comedy short film starring W. C. Fields, produced by Mack Sennett, and released theatrically by Paramount Pictures. Written by Fields and directed by Clyde Bruckman, the film is a parody of rugged stage melodramas set in the Yukon.

== Plot ==
The full film

Ma and Pa Snavely live in a cabin in the Yukon. Many years before, their son Chester left for the big city and became involved in crime after "the fatal glass of beer".

Pa Snavely, as portrayed by Fields, serenades a Royal Canadian Mounted Police officer with "The Fatal Glass of Beer", a mournful song detailing the evils of drinking and bad companions in the big city. An autoharp accompaniment recorded for the film seldom matches the vocal, because Fields subtly changes keys when the autoharp does not, resulting in a humorously off-key effect.

Son Chester returns home after getting out of prison, and promises his mother not to tell his father what he really did. He makes the same promise to his father. When Pa and Ma learn that Chester threw the bonds away and intends to live off their savings, they hurl him out of the house.

Fields emphasizes the stagey satire by striking various poses and being overly theatrical with the dialogue. The most famous gag has Fields opening the cabin door periodically and exclaiming, "And it ain't a fit night out for man or beast!", with some obviously fake snow thrown into his face a moment later. He would reprise that gag during the "play-within-the-play" in The Old Fashioned Way (1934).

== Cast ==
- W. C. Fields as Pa Snavely
- Rosemary Theby as Ma Snavely
- George Chandler as Chester Snavely, their son
- Richard Cramer as Constable Posthlewhistle, Royal Canadian Mounted Police

== Notes ==
- The Fatal Glass of Beer is one of three W. C. Fields short films that entered the public domain after the copyright lapsed in the 1960s (the other two being The Dentist and The Golf Specialist). As such, these three films frequently appear on inexpensive video or DVD compilations.
- This sketch was originally a stage play and was not filmed until 1933. This is evidenced with a wanted poster of Fields in a Yukon prospector's outfit, as seen in The Golf Specialist.
- Clive James referenced the film in his television criticism column for The Observer, collected in The Crystal Bucket, criticising a 1978 British television production of Wuthering Heights (which he called "Wuthering Depths" and "The blithering pits") for its cheap production values.

Purporting to be in Alaska, Fields continually goes to the door, declaring "it ain't a fit night out for man or beast", only to be hit with a bucket of snow.
Heathcliff: "It ain't a fit night out for man nor beast, Kathy." Phwoosh!

— Clive James, The Crystal Bucket
