= Toll of the Desert =

1935 film

- Directed by: William Berke
- Written by: Allen Hall; Miller Easton
- Produced by: William Berke
- Starring: Fred Kohler, Jr. Betty Mack; Roger Williams
- Cinematography: Robert E. Cline
- Edited by: Arthur A. Brooks
- Music by: Lee Zahler
- Production company: William Berke Productions
- Distributed by: Ajax Pictures
- Release date: May 5, 1935
- Running time: 60 minutes
- Country: United States
- Language: English

The full film

Toll of the Desert is a 1935 American Western film directed by William Berke and starring Fred Kohler, Jr., Betty Mack, and Roger Williams.

== Plot ==
When a cowboy's covered wagon is attacked by Indians, he becomes convinced that his wife and young son have been killed. Rescued from the attack by a roving band of crooks, the grateful father joins the gang, becoming an outlaw and hired gunman. Unbeknownst to him, his son survives the Indian attack and grows up to become a lawman who eventually has to hunt down his outlaw father.

== Cast ==
- Fred Kohler Jr. as Bill Collins aka Bill Carson
- Betty Mack as Jean Streeter
- Roger Williams as Tom Collins
- Earl Dwire as Joe Carson
- Tom London as Sheriff Jackson
- Ted AdamsTeague
- George Chesebro as Carter - Henchman
- John Elliott as Judge
- Ruth Findlay as Ruth Carson
- Ed Cassidy as Streeter
- Barney Beasley as Perez - Henchman
- Budd Buster as Bartender
- Herman Hack as Henchman
- Jack Hendricks as Deputy
- William McCall as Stagecoach Driver
- Milburn Morante as Hank
- Tex Palmer as Tex - Henchman

== Critical reception ==
Paul C. Mooney Jr. of Motion Picture Herald was not impressed, and wrote, "An unpretentious western, this production offers little to intrigue patrons. It has its quota of riding, shooting and hand-to-hand battling, but these sequences are far from convincing."

== Bibliography ==
- Pitts, Michael R. Poverty Row Studios, 1929–1940. McFarland & Company, 2005.
