= The Pecos Kid =

1935 film

- Directed by: Harry L. Fraser
- Written by: Henry Hess (screenplay); Ted Tuttle (story)
- Produced by: William Berke
- Starring: Fred Kohler, Jr.
- Edited by: Arthur A. Brooks
- Distributed by: Commodore Pictures
- Release date: April 1, 1935
- Running time: 60 minutes
- Country: United States
- Language: English

The Pecos Kid is a 1935 American Western film directed by Harry L. Fraser.

== Plot summary ==
Land Baron James Grayson and his gang steal the Pecos' family Rancho and kill the male adults, leaving young Donald still alive. Years later, Donald re-appears as the Pecos Kid to face down Grayson and his gang to get his family land back, along with a gold mine.

== Cast ==
- Fred Kohler, Jr. as Donald Pecos / The Pecos Kid
- Ruth Findlay as Mary Evans
- Roger Williams as James Grayson
- Ed Cassidy as Doc Evans
- Hal Taliaferro as Eric Grayson
- Earl Dwire as Jose
- Francis Walker as Henchman Chuck
