= Wild Mustang (film) =

- Theatrical release poster
- Directed by: Harry L. Fraser
- Screenplay by: Harry L. Fraser
- Produced by: William Berke
- Starring: Harry Carey; Barbara Fritchie; Del Gordon; Katheryn Johns; Bob Kortman; George Chesebro; Chuck Morrison; Dick Botiller; George Morrell; Milburn Morante
- Cinematography: Robert E. Cline
- Edited by: Arthur A. Brooks
- Production company: William Berke Productions Inc.
- Distributed by: Ajax Pictures Corporation
- Release date: October 22, 1935
- Running time: 62 minutes
- Country: United States
- Language: English

Wild Mustang is a 1935 American Western film written and directed by Harry L. Fraser. The film stars Harry Carey, Barbara Fritchie, Del Gordon, Katheryn Johns, Bob Kortman, George Chesebro, Chuck Morrison, Dick Botiller, George Morrell and Milburn Morante. The film was released on October 22, 1935, by Ajax Pictures Corporation.

== Cast ==
- Harry Carey as Joe 'Wild Mustang' Norton
- Barbara Fritchie as Jill McClay
- Del Gordon as Reno Norton
- Katheryn Johns as Ma McClay
- Bob Kortman as Utah Evans
- George Chesebro as Deputy Tex Carter
- Chuck Morrison as Henchman
- Dick Botiller as Juan Romano Calinie
- George Morrell as Sheriff Terry McClay
- Milburn Morante as Steve Randall
