= Feud of the Range =

- Theatrical release poster
- Directed by: Harry S. Webb
- Screenplay by: Carl Krusada
- Story by: George H. Plympton
- Produced by: Harry S. Webb
- Starring: Bob Steele; Richard Cramer; Gertrude Messinger; Frank LaRue; Jean Cranford; Bob Burns
- Cinematography: Edward A. Kull
- Edited by: S. Roy Luby
- Music by: Frank Sanucci
- Production company: Metropolitan Pictures Corporation
- Distributed by: Metropolitan Pictures Corporation
- Release date: January 15, 1939
- Running time: 55 minutes
- Country: United States
- Language: English

Feud of the Range is a 1939 American Western film produced and directed by Harry S. Webb and written by Carl Krusada. The film stars Bob Steele, Richard Cramer, Gertrude Messinger, Frank LaRue, Jean Cranford and Bob Burns. The film was released on January 15, 1939, by Metropolitan Pictures Corporation.

== Plot ==
Barton and Dirk create a range war between the Gray and Allen ranches in order to get the ranchers to sell out to them so they can sell the land to the railroad. Sheriff Waters sends for Tom Gray's son Bob to speak to his father about stopping the war. The Sheriff deputises Bob and his sidekick Happy.

== Cast ==
- Bob Steele as Bob Gray
- Richard Cramer as Tom Gray
- Gertrude Messinger as Madge Allen
- Frank LaRue as Harvey Allen
- Jean Cranford as Helen Wilson
- Bob Burns as Pop Wilson
- Budd Buster as Happy
- Jack Ingram as Clyde Barton
- Charles King as Dirk
- Duke R. Lee as Sheriff Cal Waters
