= Roaring Roads =

1935 film

- Directed by: Ray Nazarro; Charles E. Roberts
- Written by: David Sharpe; Charles E. Roberts
- Produced by: William Berke
- Starring: David Sharpe; Gertrude Messinger; Mary Kornman
- Cinematography: Pliny Goodfriend; Robert E. Cline
- Edited by: Arthur A. Brooks
- Production company: William Berke Productions
- Distributed by: Commodore Pictures; Butcher's Film Service (UK)
- Release date: April 13, 1935
- Running time: 57 minutes
- Country: United States
- Language: English

Roaring Roads is a 1935 American action film directed by Charles E. Roberts and Ray Nazarro. It featured three actors from the Our Gang films: David Sharpe, Mary Kornman and Mickey Daniels. It was the second and last film in the series Our Young Friends, the first being Adventurous Knights.

== Plot ==
A rich boy likes to take risks escapes from his overprotective aunts. Pursued by crooks, he is aided in his adventures by Gertie, Mary, and Mickie.

== Cast ==
- David Sharpe as David Morton / David Smith
- Gertrude Messinger as Gertrude "Gertie" McDowell
- Mary Kornman as Mary McDowell
- Mickey Daniels as Mickey Daniels
- Jack Mulhall as Donald McDowell
- Eddie Phillips as Gangster
- Vera Lewis as Aunt Harriet
- Heinie Conklin as Bodyguard
- Al Thompson as Bodyguard
- Matty Fain as Henchman
- Charles Moyer as Henchman
- Helen Hunt as Aunt Agatha
- Fred Kohler Jr. as Sam
