= The Vanishing Riders =

1935 film

- Directed by: Robert F. Hill
- Written by: Oliver Drake (writer)
- Produced by: Ray Kirkwood (producer)
- Starring: See below
- Cinematography: William Hyer
- Edited by: Holbrook N. Todd
- Release date: 1935
- Running time: 58 minutes
- Country: United States
- Language: English

The Vanishing Riders is a 1935 American Western film directed by Robert F. Hill.

== Cast ==
- Bill Cody as Bill Jones
- Bill Cody Jr. as Tim Lang
- Ethel Jackson as Joan Stanley
- Hal Taliaferro as Wolf Lawson
- Donald Reed as Frank Stanley
- Budd Buster as Hiram McDuff
- Roger Williams as Joe Lang
- Ace Cain as Kentuck (a thug)
- Colin Chase as Henchman Luke

== Soundtrack ==
- "We're The Bandoliers" (Written by Oliver Drake)
