= Gertrude Messinger =

American actress (1911–1995)

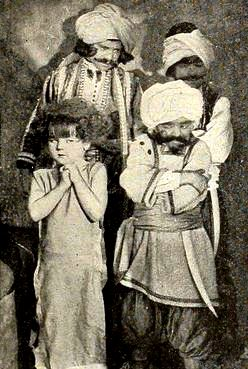
- As a child actress in Ali Baba and the Forty Thieves (1918)
- Born: Gertrude Dolores Messinger; April 28, 1911; Spokane, Washington, U.S.
- Died: November 8, 1995 (aged 84); Woodland Hills, Los Angeles, California, U.S.
- Other names: Gertrude Messenger; Gertie Messinger
- Occupation: Film actress
- Years active: 1920s–1950s
- Spouse(s): David Sharpe (1932–1936) (divorced); Henry Walsh Knight (1939–1939) (divorced); Schuyler Anthony Sanford (1939–1995) (death)

Gertrude Dolores Messinger (April 28, 1911 – November 8, 1995) was an American film actress known for her B-movie roles from the 1930s through the 1950s. She began as a child actor in silent films, but found her greatest fame in talkies of the 1930s. During her career she appeared in more than 50 motion pictures, with particular success in westerns.

== Biography ==
Born on April 28, 1911, in Spokane, Washington, she began acting early, playing child roles in silent films as early as 1917, when she had a role in the film Babes in the Woods. Fellow child actor Buddy Messinger was her brother. Her name was sometimes spelled Gertrude Messenger and she was also known as Gertie Messinger.

During the 1930s, her career took off, with significant roles in more than 30 films. Her earliest starring roles were in 1932 when she starred opposite Bob Steele in Riders of the Desert, and opposite Lane Chandler in Lawless Valley. For the remainder of the 1930s, she was fairly active in films.

In 1934, she played a major part in arguably her biggest movie Anne of Green Gables, with the starring role being played by actress Dawn O'Day (later known as Anne Shirley). Her most active year was 1935 when she starred in eight feature films, most notably The Fighting Pilot with Richard Talmadge and Wagon Trail opposite Harry Carey.

In April 1932, she fled with her fiancé and eloped with actor Dave Sharpe. In 1939, she married cameraman Schuyler Sanford, who later won an Oscar for his work on the film Around the World in 80 Days.

Her career slowed considerably in the 1940s, but she continued to act, mostly in uncredited roles. Her last credited role was in the 1949 film Joe Palooka in the Counterpunch. In 1952, she played in her last film, The Greatest Show on Earth, which was uncredited. She appeared in a total of 52 films in her career, 11 of which were Western films.

== Death ==
Gertrude Messinger died of congestive heart failure in Woodland Hills, Los Angeles, on November 8, 1995, aged 84.

== Selected filmography ==
- A Bit o' Heaven (1917) - A Raggedy Ruggles
- Jack and the Beanstalk (1917)
- Aladdin and the Wonderful Lamp (1917) - Yasmini
- The Babes in the Woods (1917)
- Treasure Island (1917)
- The Girl with the Champagne Eyes (1918) - Miner's Child
- Fan Fan (1918)
- Ali Baba and the Forty Thieves (1918) - Morgiianna
- Miss Adventure (1919) - Jane, as a child
- The Luck of the Irish (1920) - The Kid's Romance
- Rip Van Winkle (1921) - Meenie Van Winkle, as a child
- Penrod and Sam (1923) - Marjorie Jones
- The Barefoot Boy (1923) - Mary Truesdale - as a Child
- The Jazz Age (1929) - Marjorie
- The Duke Steps Out (1929) - College Girl (uncredited)
- Two Weeks Off (1929) - Tessie McCann
- The Rampant Age (1930) - Julie
- The Boy Friends (1930-1932, Short) - Gertie
- Sinister Hands (1932) - Betty Lang
- Lawless Valley (1932) - Rosita
- Riders of the Desert (1932) - Barbara
- Madame Racketeer (1932) - Patsy Hicks
- Hidden Valley (1932) - Joyce Lanners
- The Woman Accused (1933) - Evelyn Craig
- He Learned About Women (1933) - Minor Role (uncredited)
- Bondage (1933) - (uncredited)
- Diamond Trail (1933) - Blonde Secretary (uncredited)
- Love Past Thirty (1934) - Zelda Burt
- Hat, Coat, and Glove (1934) - Elevator Operator (uncredited)
- The Age of Innocence (1934) - Ship Passenger (uncredited)
- Anne of Green Gables (1934) - Diana
- The Fighting Pilot (1935) - Jean Reynolds
- Wagon Trail (1935) - Joan Collins
- Roaring Roads (1935) - Gertrude 'Gertie' McDowell
- Social Error (1935) - June Merton
- Rustler's Paradise (1935) - Connie
- Adventurous Knights (1935) - Princess Carmencita
- The Rider of the Law (1935) - Ann Carver
- Melody Trail (1935) - Cowgirl Cuddles
- Blazing Justice (1936) - Virginia Peterson
- The Return of Jimmy Valentine (1936) - Blonde (uncredited)
- The Drag-Net (1936) - Switchboard Operator (uncredited)
- The Border Patrolman (1936) - Telephone Operator (uncredited)
- Our Relations (1936) - Pirate's Club Customer (uncredited)
- Aces Wild (1936) - Martha Worth
- Rose Bowl (1936) - Girl (uncredited)
- Wild Brian Kent (1936) - Operator (uncredited)
- Secret Valley (1937) - Martin's Secretary (uncredited)
- King of Gamblers (1937) - Telephone Operator (uncredited)
- Atlantic Flight (1937) - Mary (uncredited)
- Carnival Queen (1937) - Small Young Woman (uncredited)
- Feud of the Range (1939) - Madge Allen
- Zenobia (1939) - Party Guest (uncredited)
- Our Leading Citizen (1939) - Phone Operator (uncredited)
- The Great Victor Herbert (1939) - Barney's Secretary (uncredited)
- Ride, Tenderfoot, Ride (1940) - Miss Robinson (uncredited)
- Gambling Daughters (1941) - Jane
- Niagara Falls (1941) - Telephone Operator (uncredited)
- The Miracle Kid (1941) - Marge
- Pardon My Stripes (1942) - Telephone Operator (uncredited)
- Syncopation (1942) - Bride (uncredited)
- Redhead from Manhattan (1943) - Club Patron (uncredited)
- Destroyer (1943) - Girl (uncredited)
- Joe Palooka in the Counterpunch (1949) - Nurse
- Samson and Delilah (1949) - (uncredited)
- Sunset Boulevard (1950) - Hairdresser (uncredited)
- The Greatest Show on Earth (1952) - Gertrude (uncredited) (final film role)
