= Rustler's Paradise =

1935 film

- Directed by: Harry L. Fraser
- Written by: Harry L. Fraser
- Produced by: William Berke
- Starring: Harry Carey; Gertrude Messinger; Edmund Cobb
- Cinematography: Robert E. Cline
- Edited by: Arthur A. Brooks
- Production company: William Berke Productions
- Distributed by: Ajax Pictures
- Release date: May 1, 1935
- Running time: 61 minutes
- Country: United States
- Language: English

Rustler's Paradise is a 1935 American western film directed by Harry L. Fraser and starring Harry Carey, Gertrude Messinger and Edmund Cobb. It was produced by the Poverty Row studio Ajax Pictures for release as a second feature. It was later reissued by Astor Pictures in 1947.

== Plot ==
Veteran rustler Cheyenne Kincaid discovers that the gang he is now riding with are led by the man responsible for killing his wife and kidnapping his daughter years before. He bonds with Connie, a young woman he discovers is his daughter, and helps a local landowner to fight off the gang.

== Cast ==
- Harry Carey as Cheyenne Kincaid
- Gertrude Messinger as Connie
- Edmund Cobb as Larry Martin
- Carmen Bailey as Dolores Romero
- Theodore Lorch as El Diablo
- Roger Williams as Henchman Todd
- Chuck Morrison as Henchman
- Allen Greer as Henchman Antonio
- Chief Thundercloud as Henchman
- Slim Whitaker as Senor Romero
- Jimmy Aubrey as Henchman
- Barney Beasley as Henchman
- Tex Palmer as Henchman

== Bibliography ==
- Pitts, Michael R. Poverty Row Studios, 1929–1940. McFarland & Company, 2005.
