= Timber War =

1935 film directed by Sam Newfield

- Directed by: Sam Newfield
- Written by: Joseph O'Donnell; Barry Barringer
- Based on: the short story, "Hell's Gulch" by James Oliver Curwood
- Produced by: Sigmund Neufeld; Maurice Conn
- Starring: Kermit Maynard; Lucille Lund; Lawrence Gray
- Cinematography: Jack Greenhalgh
- Edited by: Richard G. Wray
- Production company: Ambassador Pictures
- Release date: November 20, 1935 (US)
- Running time: 58 minutes
- Country: United States
- Language: English

Timber War is a 1935 American western drama film directed by Sam Newfield from a screenplay by Jos. O'Donnell and Barry Barringer. The film stars Kermit Maynard, Lucille Lund, and Lawrence Gray.

== Cast ==
- Kermit Maynard as Jim Dolan
- Lucille Lund as Sally Martin
- Lawrence Gray as Larry Keene
- Robert Warwick as Ferguson
- Wheeler Oakman as Murdock
- Lloyd Ingraham as Terry O'Leary
- Roger Williams as Bowan
- Patricia Royale as Secretary
- Jim Pierce as Braden
- Horace Murphy as Charlie
