= Frontier Justice (film) =

1935 film

- Directed by: Robert F. McGowan
- Screenplay by: Scott Darling; Harry S. Webb (uncredited); Homer King Gordon (additional dialogue)
- Based on: the novel by Colonel George Brydges Rodney
- Produced by: Walter Futter
- Starring: Hoot Gibson
- Cinematography: Arthur Reed
- Edited by: Carl Himm
- Music by: Lee Zahler
- Production company: Walter Futter Productions
- Distributed by: Diversion Pictures; Grand National Pictures
- Release date: 1 October 1935
- Running time: 58 minutes
- Country: United States
- Language: English

Frontier Justice is a 1935 black-and-white Western film directed by Robert F. McGowan starring Hoot Gibson based on the novel by Colonel George Brydges Rodney. Produced for Walter Futter's Diversion Pictures, it was rereleased by Grand National Pictures in 1937 and later reissued by Astor Pictures in the 1940s.

== Plot ==
In order to seize his cattle ranch to turn it into a sheep pasture, a wealthy sheepman and a crooked doctor have the ranch owner Sam Holster certified insane and placed in an insane asylum. His son returns from five years in Baja California to stop the range war and set things straight using his six gun and a variety of mail order practical joke devices.

== Cast ==
- Hoot Gibson as Brent Halston
- Jane Barnes as Ethel Gordon
- Richard Cramer as Gilbert Ware
- Roger Williams as James Wilton
- John Elliott as Ben Livesay
- Franklyn Farnum as Lawyer George Lessin
- Lloyd Ingraham as Dr. Close
- Joseph W. Girard as Samuel Halston
- Fred 'Snowflake' Toones as Snowflake
- George Yeoman as Sheriff Sam Simon
