= Lawless Valley (1938 film) =

1938 film directed by David Howard

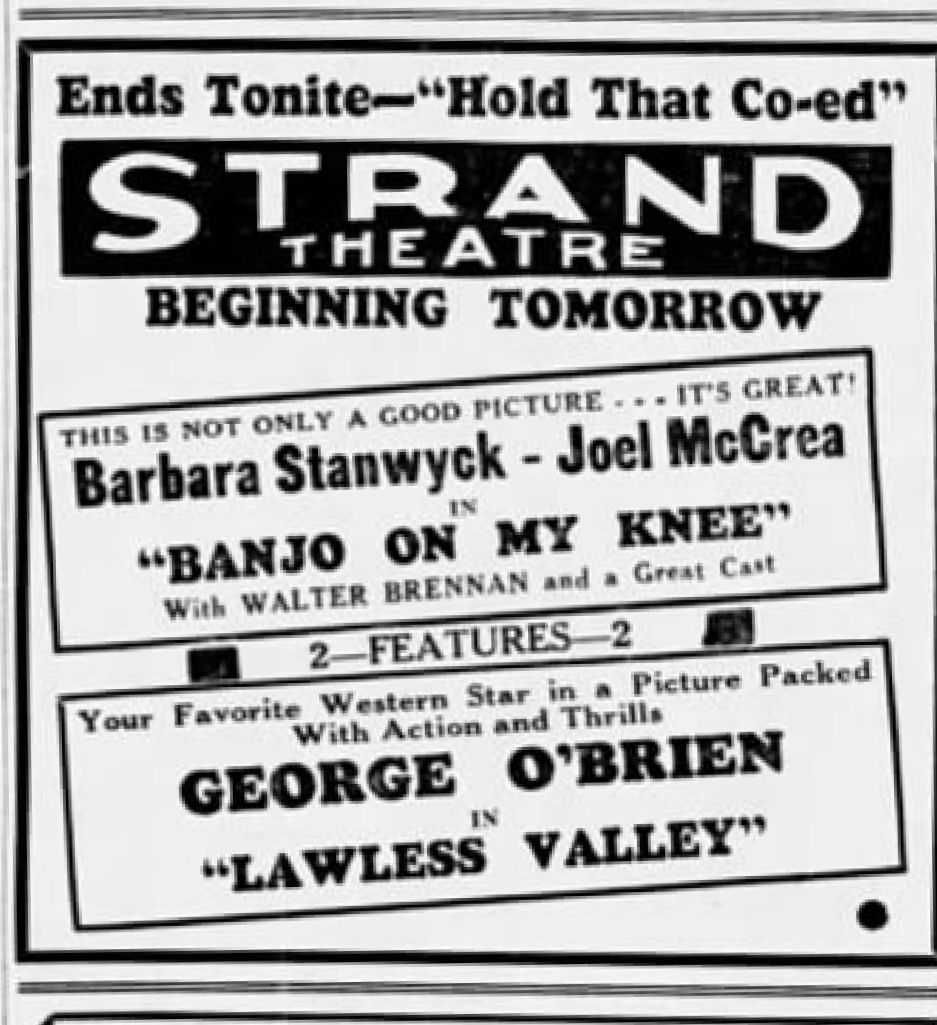
- Newspaper advertisement
- Directed by: David Howard; Harry Mancke (assistant)
- Screenplay by: Oliver Drake
- Based on: "No Law in Shadow Valley" by W. C. Tuttle
- Produced by: Bert Gilroy; Lee Marcus (associate)
- Starring: George O'Brien; Kay Sutton
- Cinematography: Harry Wild
- Edited by: Fred Knudtson
- Music by: Roy Webb (uncredited); Robert Russell Bennett (uncredited)
- Production company: RKO Radio Pictures
- Release date: November 4, 1938 (US)
- Running time: 60 minutes
- Country: United States
- Language: English

Lawless Valley is a 1938 American Western film directed by David Howard from a screenplay by Oliver Drake, based on the short story "No Law in Shadow Valley" by W. C. Tuttle. Produced and distributed by RKO Radio Pictures, it opened on November 4, 1938. The film stars George O'Brien, Kay Sutton and Fred Kohler. Kohler died one week before the film's release.

== Plot ==
In the Old West, Larry Rhodes, framed for robbery, is paroled and returns to seek the killer of his father, who allegedly died by suicide. The town is run by ruthless cattle baron Tom Marsh and his son, Jeff Marsh. Tom is the guardian of Norma Rogers who is Larry's sweetheart, but Tom intends Norma to marry Jeff. Larry retrieves his father's gun, a .41 Colt, from a local, Tim Wade. Larry discovers the gun is unable to fire because it lacks a spring. Marsh attempts to have Larry arrested by Sheriff Heck Hampton and Deputy Speedy McGow for violating his parole for possession of the gun. However, Larry avoids arrest and sends the gun to be repaired in nearby Granite City. Norma tells Marsh that if he will let Larry leave town in peace, she will marry Jeff. Marsh agrees, but sends his gang to ambush Larry on his way out of town. Larry subdues the gang and returns with Tim Wade to question Sheriff Hampton and Deputy McGow about the circumstances surrounding his father's death. They confess that in their investigation of a Wells Fargo stage robbery, the real perpetrator, Marsh, murdered Larry's father while framing him for the robbery. The sheriff was in cahoots with Marsh to make the murder appear to be suicide, but since the .41 Colt was not in working order, they attempted to have it repaired afterward but were unsuccessful. Larry and Tim interrupt the wedding between Norma and Jeff to declare the truth. A fight ensues and the Marshes are arrested. Larry discovers Tim Wade is also a treasury agent who was investigating the robbery and his father's death. Norma, already dressed for her wedding, tells Larry it would be a shame for the visiting justice of the peace to make another trip.

== Cast ==
- George O'Brien as Larry Rhodes
- Kay Sutton as Norma Rogers
- Walter Miller as Bob North
- Fred Kohler as Tom Marsh (credited as Fred Kohler Sr.)
- Fred Kohler Jr. as Jeff Marsh
- Lew Kelly as Fresno
- George MacQuarrie as Tim Wade
- Earle Hodgins as Sheriff Heck Hampton
- Chill Wills as Deputy Speedy McGow
- Dot Farley as Anna
- Victor Adamson as Townsman (uncredited)
- George Chesebro as Ranch Hand (uncredited)
- Ben Corbett as Short Ranch Hand (uncredited)
- The Four Tunes as Boxcar Singers (uncredited)
- Kirby Grant as Ranch Hand (uncredited)
- James Mason as Ranch Hand (uncredited)
- Bob McKenzie as Justice James McClung (uncredited)
- Carl Miller as Ranch Hand (uncredited)
- Frank O'Connor as Prison Guard (uncredited)
- Carl Stockdale as Seth, a Storekeeper (uncredited)
