= Richard Cramer =

American actor (1889–1960)

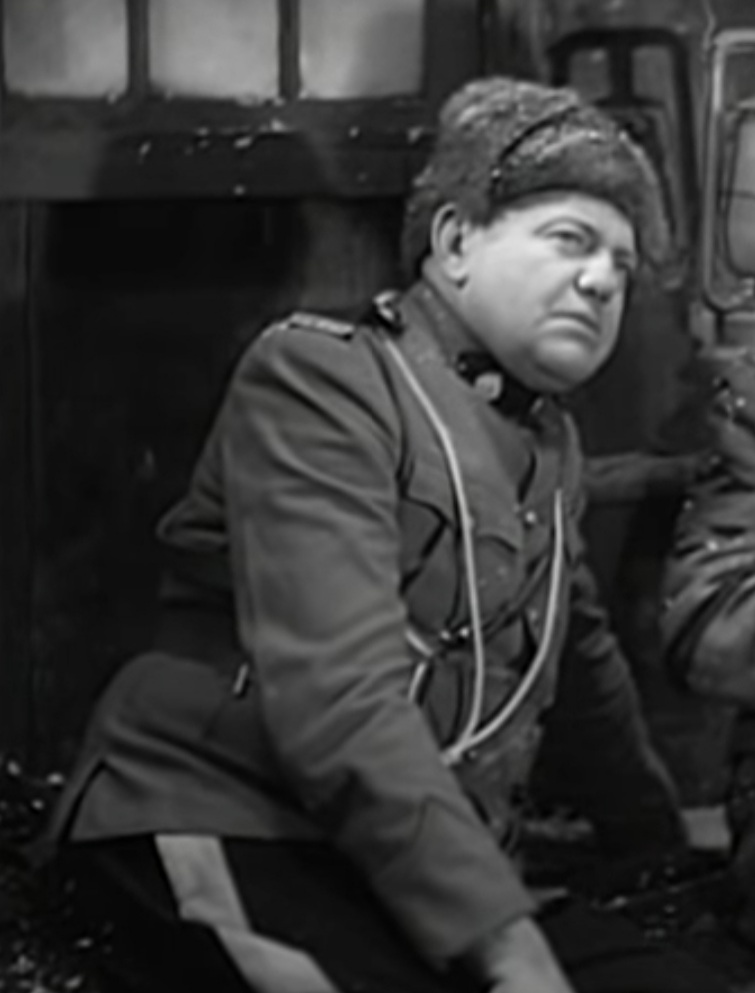
- Cramer in The Fatal Glass of Beer (1933)
- Born: Richard Earl Cramer; July 3, 1889; Bryan, Ohio, US
- Died: August 9, 1960 (aged 71); Los Angeles, California, US
- Other names: Rychard Cramer; Dick Cramer
- Occupation: Actor
- Years active: 1927–1952

Richard Earl Cramer (July 3, 1889 – August 9, 1960) was an American actor in films from 1925 to 1952.

Cramer specialized in villainous roles in many low-budget westerns, but is today best remembered for his several appearances with Laurel and Hardy. He also appeared with W. C. Fields in his short film, The Fatal Glass of Beer (1933), which Mack Sennett produced.

He was occasionally billed as Rychard Cramer or Dick Cramer.

== Life and career ==
According to his professional resumé published in 1946, Richard Cramer attended Ohio State University. He made his acting debut in 1911 and worked in repertory and stock productions, and finally on the New York stage. On Broadway, Cramer portrayed Rube in Buddies (1919) and Hernando in Sancho Panza (1923).

He made his screen debut in 1925 in Hollywood, and his first talking-picture credit was Kid Gloves (1929) for Warner Bros. In his early sound films Cramer was cast in various character roles, usually as a police detective (as in the Philo Vance mystery The Bishop Murder Case, 1929). In 1930 he appeared in a few two-reel comedies for Pathé, starring burlesque comedian Bob Carney and character comic Si Wills. These established Richard Cramer as a reliable foil for screen comedians, and he was soon working for pioneer comedy producers Mack Sennett and Hal Roach. Cramer is perhaps most familiar to today's audiences for his colorful portrayals in Roach's Laurel and Hardy comedies.

He also worked in a handful of serials, lending atmosphere to western and seagoing stories. His most memorable work in this field was a surprise appearance, without screen credit, as "The Apache Killer," a gleeful hired gun, in Columbia's ambitious outdoor serial The Great Adventures of Wild Bill Hickok (1938).

Cramer played character roles in occasional high-profile feature films (like MGM's After the Thin Man in 1936, and Columbia's first Technicolor feature, The Desperadoes, in 1943). In his resumé he wrote "Also westerns," dismissing these minor, low-budget credits. Cramer made dozens of quickie westerns between more prestigious assignments. In the 1940s he was employed most often by PRC, and was usually cast as bartenders (ironically, considering his struggle with alcoholism during this period).

His roles became fewer as illness kept him from working steadily. He retired from the screen in 1952, and died of cirrhosis in Los Angeles in 1960.

== Partial filmography ==
- The Love Mart (1927)
- Sharp Shooters (1928)
- The Tiger's Shadow (1928)
- Kid Gloves (1929)
- The Lost Zeppelin (1929)
- The Bishop Murder Case (1929)
- Murder on the Roof (1930)
- Hell's Island (1930)
- Captain of the Guard (1930)
- Those Who Dance (1930)
- Big Money (1930)
- Night Beat (1931)
- The Pocatello Kid (1931)
- Hell-Bent for Frisco (1931)
- Lariats and Six-Shooters (1931)
- Is There Justice? (1931)
- The Last Parade (1931)
- The Painted Desert (1931)
- Scram! (1932, short)
- 45 Calibre Echo (1932)
- Lawless Valley (1932)
- Behind Jury Doors (1932)
- Pack Up Your Troubles (1932)
- The Fatal Glass of Beer (1933, short)
- Alimony Madness (1933)
- The Cat's-Paw (1934)
- Western Racketeers (1934)
- The Law of the Wild (1934)
- Danger Ahead (1935)
- The Judgement Book (1935)
- Riddle Ranch (1935)
- A Scream in the Night (1935)
- The Outlaw Tamer (1935)
- Frontier Justice (1935)
- Sutter's Gold (1936)
- After the Thin Man (1936)
- The Speed Reporter (1936)
- Where Trails Divide (1937)
- The Rangers' Round-Up (1938)
- Songs and Bullets (1938)
- Bad Boy (1939)
- The Flying Deuces (1939)
- Feud of the Range (1939)
- Arizona Frontier (1940)
- Pioneer Days (1940)
- Saps at Sea (1940)
- Double Trouble (1941)
- The Spoilers (1942)
- Rock River Renegades (1942)
- Boot Hill Bandits (1942)
- Scarlet Street (1945)
- Wild Country (1947)
- The Baron of Arizona (1950)
- Santa Fe (1951)
- The Sellout (1952)
