= Wagon Trail =

1935 film

- Directed by: Harry L. Fraser
- Written by: Harry L. Fraser
- Produced by: William Berke
- Starring: Harry Carey; Gertrude Messinger; Edward Norris
- Cinematography: Robert E. Cline
- Edited by: Arthur A. Brooks
- Production company: William Berke Productions
- Distributed by: Ajax Pictures; Commodore Pictures
- Release date: April 9, 1935
- Running time: 55 minutes
- Country: United States
- Language: English

Wagon Trail is a 1935 American western film directed by Harry L. Fraser and starring Harry Carey, Gertrude Messinger and Edward Norris. It was produced as an independent second feature in Hollywood's Poverty Row. It was re-released by Astor Pictures in 1948.

== Plot ==
Clay Hartley Jr., the son of the town's sheriff, gets trapped in gambling debts by his future father-in-law, Collins. Collins coerces Junior to act as a lookout for a stagecoach robbery where a deputy sheriff is killed; the only one caught is Clay Junior. Clay Senior loses his badge and takes the opportunity to deal out harsh justice.

== Cast ==
- Harry Carey as Sheriff Clay Hartley
- Gertrude Messinger as Joan Collins
- Edward Norris as Clay Hartley, Jr.
- Roger Williams as Mark Collins
- Earl Dwire as Deputy Joe Larkin
- Chuck Morrison as Deputy Chuck
- John Elliott as Judge
- Chief Thundercloud as Henchman
- Lew Meehan as Henchman
- Barney Beasley as Henchman
- Tex Palmer as Henchman

== Bibliography ==
- Pitts, Michael R. Poverty Row Studios, 1929–1940. McFarland & Company, 2005.
