= Adventurous Knights =

1935 film directed by Charles E. Roberts

- Directed by: Charles E. Roberts
- Written by: David Sharpe; Charles E. Roberts
- Produced by: William Berke
- Starring: David Sharpe; Gertrude Messinger; Mary Kornman
- Cinematography: Robert E. Cline
- Edited by: Arthur A. Brooks
- Music by: Lee Zahler
- Production company: William Berke Productions
- Distributed by: Ajax Pictures
- Release date: June 7, 1935
- Running time: 56 minutes
- Country: United States
- Language: English

Adventurous Knights is a 1935 American comedy adventure film directed by Charles E. Roberts and starring David Sharpe, Gertrude Messinger and Mary Kornman. It was parody reworking of The Prisoner of Zenda. It was intended to be the first of six films featuring former Our Gang actors produced for Poverty Row studio Ajax Pictures, but only this and Roaring Roads were ever made.

== Plot ==
A successful American college athlete discovers that he is really the heir to the throne of a small Ruritanian European Kingdom. He travels there to take up his duties and see off a challenge from a pretender. He is appalled to discover that he has to marry a girl he has never seen before, without realizing he has met and fallen in love with her already.

== Cast ==
- David Sharpe as David De Portola
- Gertrude Messinger as Princess Carmencita
- Mary Kornman as Annette
- Mickey Daniels as Mickey Daniels
- Roger Williams as Black Prince
- Eddie Phillips as Henchman
- Al Thompson as Parkins - the Butler

== Bibliography ==
- Balio, Tino. Grand Design: Hollywood as a Modern Business Enterprise, 1930-1939. University of California Press, 1995.
- Pitts, Michael R. Poverty Row Studios, 1929-1940. McFarland & Company, 1997.
