= Fred Kohler Jr. =

American actor (1911–1993)

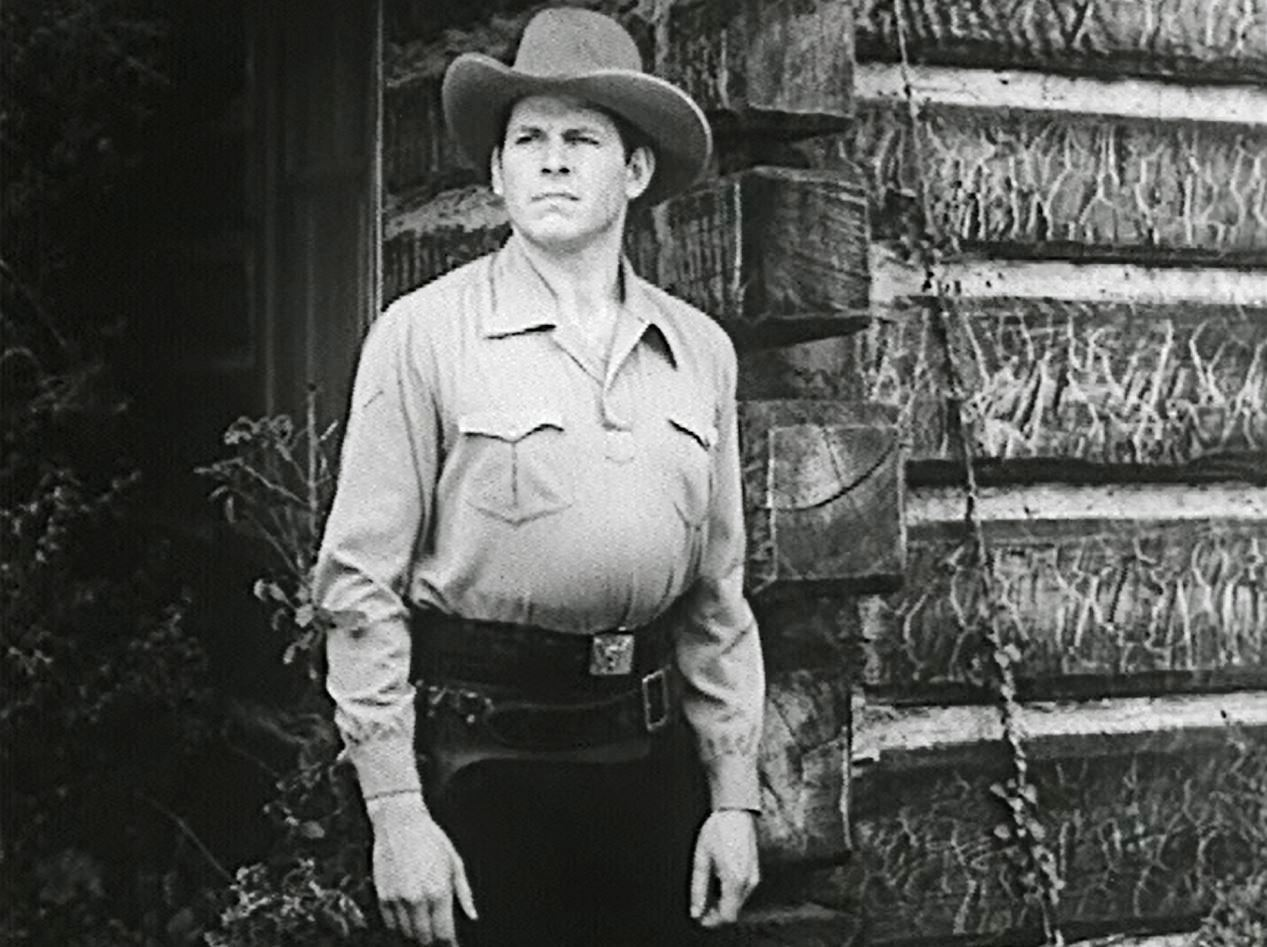
- Kohler Jr. in Western Mail (1942)
- Born: July 8, 1911; Los Angeles, California, U.S.
- Died: January 7, 1993 (aged 81); Scottsdale, Arizona, U.S.
- Occupation: Actor
- Years active: 1929–1978
- Children: Frederick G Kohler
- Parent: Fred Kohler

Fred Kohler Jr. (July 8, 1911 – January 7, 1993) was an American actor who performed in a number of Westerns such as The Pecos Kid and Toll of the Desert. He played nearly 130 film and television roles between 1929 and 1978.

Kohler's mother was actress Marjorie Prole, and his father was actor Fred Kohler. Father and son appeared in two films together. In RKO's Lawless Valley, they played father and son outlaws. In one scene, Fred Jr.'s character says to his father's character, "Aw, that's crazy!", and Fred Sr. responds "Careful, son, you're talkin' to your dad, ya know!"

From 1951 to 1958 Kohler played Jordan on The Adventures of Wild Bill Hickok television series.

== Selected filmography ==
- Sweetie (1929) - Student Football Player (uncredited)
- Maybe It's Love (1930) - Football Player (uncredited)
- Renegades (1930) - Young Legionnaire (uncredited)
- A Holy Terror (1931) - Party Guest (uncredited)
- Bad Company (1931) - Yacht Guest (uncredited)
- Devil and the Deep (1932) - Submarine Crewman (uncredited)
- Movie Crazy (1932) - Young Actor in Waiting Room (uncredited)
- 70,000 Witnesses (1932) - Football Player (uncredited)
- Pack Up Your Troubles (1932) - Doughboy (uncredited)
- Afraid to Talk (1932) - Max - Elevator Operator (uncredited)
- Laughter in Hell (1933) - Chain Gang Member (uncredited)
- Corruption (1933) - Bud
- This Day and Age (1933) - Student (uncredited)
- Grand Old Girl (1935) - Bill Belden
- The Pecos Kid (1935) - Donald Pecos - a.k.a. The Pecos Kid
- Roaring Roads (1935) - Sam
- Social Error (1935) - Jackson
- Toll of the Desert (1935) - Bill Collins - a.k.a. Bill Carson
- The Hoosier Schoolmaster (1935) - Bud Larkin
- Paris in Spring (1935) - Collegian (uncredited)
- Steamboat Round the Bend (1935) - Ben - Fleety Belle's Fiance (uncredited)
- Red Salute (1935) - Student at Rally (uncredited)
- Strike Me Pink (1936) - Student Bully (uncredited)
- The Prisoner of Shark Island (1936) - Sgt. Cooper
- Flash Gordon (1936, Serial) - Robot / Ming's Soldier (uncredited)
- Sins of Man (1936) - Town Bully
- Two-Fisted Gentleman (1936) - Conklin
- Pigskin Parade (1936) - Biff Bentley
- The Holy Terror (1937) - Carson
- Roaring Timber (1937) - 'Curley'
- Jungle Menace (1937, Serial) - Det. John Charles - alias Quinn [Chs. 5-6]
- Life Begins in College (1937) - Bret
- Prison Nurse (1938) - Miller
- Flash Gordon's Trip to Mars (1938, Serial) - Martian Soldier (uncredited)
- Meet the Girls (1938) - Sailor (uncredited)
- Hold That Co-ed (1938) - Daly - Clayton Football Player (uncredited)
- Lawless Valley (1938) - Jeff Marsh
- Ride a Crooked Mile (1938) - Cpl. Bresline
- Texas Stampede (1939) - Wayne Cameron
- Man of Conquest (1939) - Alamo Defender (uncredited)
- Young Mr. Lincoln (1939) - Scrub White (uncredited)
- Half a Sinner (1940) - Garage Owner (uncredited)
- Two Gun Sheriff (1941) - Buck Keller - Henchman
- Nevada City (1941) - Jim Trevor a.k.a. Black Bart
- Sweetheart of the Campus (1941) - Football Player (uncredited)
- Great Guns (1941) - Corporal (uncredited)
- Bahama Passage (1941) - Mary's Naval Purser Friend (uncredited)
- Dick Tracy vs. Crime, Inc. (1941, Serial) - House Heavy (uncredited)
- Western Mail (1942) - Lucky Webster
- Raiders of the Range (1942) - Plummer
- Lone Star Ranger (1942) - Red
- Boss of Hangtown Mesa (1942) - Henchman Clem
- Lucky Jordan (1942) - Second Killer
- China Girl (1942) - Flyer (uncredited)
- No Time for Love (1943) - Sandhog (uncredited)
- Hangmen Also Die! (1943) - Czech Patriot (uncredited)
- Calling Wild Bill Elliott (1943) - John Culver
- Colt Comrades (1943) - Henchman (uncredited)
- Yanks Ahoy (1943) - Sailor Swabbing Deck (uncredited)
- Appointment in Berlin (1943) - S.S. Guard (uncredited)
- The Kansan (1943) - 1st Gate Guard (uncredited)
- The Iron Major (1943) - Boston College Captain (uncredited)
- There's Something About a Soldier (1943) - Military Policeman (uncredited)
- See Here, Private Hargrove (1944) - Lieutenant (uncredited)
- Up in Mabel's Room (1944) - Johnny (uncredited)
- The Story of Dr. Wassell (1944) - Bosun's Mate - Evacuation (uncredited)
- Mr. Winkle Goes to War (1944) - Sergeant (uncredited)
- Frenchman's Creek (1944) - Pirate (uncredited)
- The Big Bonanza (1944) - Henchman Roberts
- Why Girls Leave Home (1945) - Ted Leslie
- O.S.S. (1946) - Fireman (uncredited)
- Dishonored Lady (1947) - First Motorcycle Cop (uncredited)
- Unconquered (1947) - Sergeant (uncredited)
- The Gallant Legion (1948) - Brent (uncredited)
- Feudin', Fussin' and A-Fightin' (1948) - Emory Tuttle
- Loaded Pistols (1948) - Bill Otis
- The Gay Amigo (1949) - Brack
- Hellfire (1949) - Card Player (uncredited)
- Range Justice (1949) - Henchman Stoner
- The House Across the Street (1949) - Cabbie at Accident (uncredited)
- Tough Assignment (1949) - Grant
- Samson and Delilah (1949) - Soldier at Temple (uncredited)
- The Baron of Arizona (1950) - Demmings
- Twilight in the Sierras (1950) - Henchman Mason
- Two Lost Worlds (1951) - Nat Mercer - Sailor
- Spoilers of the Plains (1951) - Henchman Brooks
- The Red Badge of Courage (1951) - Veteran (uncredited)
- The Greatest Show on Earth (1952) - Train Fireman (uncredited)
- At Sword's Point (1952) - Regent Guard (uncredited)
- Hoodlum Empire (1952) - German Soldier (uncredited)
- Carbine Williams (1952) - Lathe Worker (uncredited)
- Sky Full of Moon (1952) - Cowhand (uncredited)
- Born to the Saddle (1953) - Jeff Sanger
- Hollywood Thrill-Makers (1954) - Film Crew
- Racing Blood (1954) - John Emerson
- The Ten Commandments (1956) - Foreman
- Daniel Boone, Trail Blazer (1956) - Kenton
- Journey to Freedom (1957) - Detective
- The Bonnie Parker Story (1958) - Dave Hiller - Rancher (uncredited)
- Terror in a Texas Town (1958) - Weed (uncredited)
- The Buccaneer (1958) - First Sergeant
- Revolt in the Big House (1958) - Guard (uncredited)
- Johnny Rocco (1958) - Glick (uncredited)
- Alias Jesse James (1959) - James Gang Member #2
- 13 Fighting Men (1960) - Corey
- The Adventures of Huckleberry Finn (1960) - Mate (uncredited)
- Custer of the West (1967)
- Ruby (1977) - Jake Miller
- Mr. Too Little (1978) - Tramp
