= Social Error =

1935 film directed by Harry L. Fraser

- Directed by: Harry L. Fraser
- Written by: David Sharpe; Charles E. Roberts
- Produced by: William Berke
- Starring: David Sharpe; Gertrude Messinger; Monte Blue
- Edited by: Arthur A. Brooks
- Music by: Lee Zahler
- Production company: William Berke Productions
- Distributed by: Ajax Pictures; Commodore Pictures
- Release date: May 1, 1935
- Running time: 57 minutes
- Country: United States
- Language: English

Social Error is a 1935 American crime film directed by Harry L. Fraser and starring David Sharpe, Gertrude Messinger and Monte Blue. It was re-released by Astor Pictures in 1948.

== Cast ==
- David Sharpe as Edward 'Eddie' Bentley Jr.
- Gertrude Messinger as June Merton
- Monte Blue as Dean Carter
- Lloyd Hughes as Attorney Johnson
- Sheila Terry as Sonia
- Fred 'Snowflake' Toones as Shadow
- Fred Kohler Jr. as Jackson
- Matty Fain as Louie
- Joseph W. Girard as Edward Bentley Sr.
- Earl Dwire as Mr. Merton

== Bibliography ==
- Pitts, Michael R. Poverty Row Studios, 1929–1940: An Illustrated History of 55 Independent Film Companies, with a Filmography for Each. McFarland & Company, 2005.
