= Lawless Valley (1932 film) =

1932 film

- Directed by: J.P. McGowan
- Written by: Oliver Drake
- Produced by: Willis Kent
- Starring: Lane Chandler; Gertrude Messinger; Richard Cramer
- Cinematography: James Diamond
- Edited by: Arthur A. Brooks
- Production company: Willis Kent Productions
- Distributed by: Progressive Pictures
- Release date: March 3, 1932
- Running time: 55 minutes
- Country: United States
- Language: English

Lawless Valley is a 1932 American Western film directed by J.P. McGowan and starring Lane Chandler, Gertrude Messinger and Richard Cramer.

== Cast ==
- Lane Chandler as Bob Rand
- Gertrude Messinger as Rosita
- Richard Cramer as Bull Lemoyne
- J.P. McGowan as Big Mike Carter
- Anne Howard as Minerva Huff
- Si Jenks as Zebb Huff

== Bibliography ==
- Michael R. Pitts. Poverty Row Studios, 1929–1940: An Illustrated History of 55 Independent Film Companies, with a Filmography for Each. McFarland & Company, 2005.
