= Roger Williams (actor) =

American actor (1898–1964)

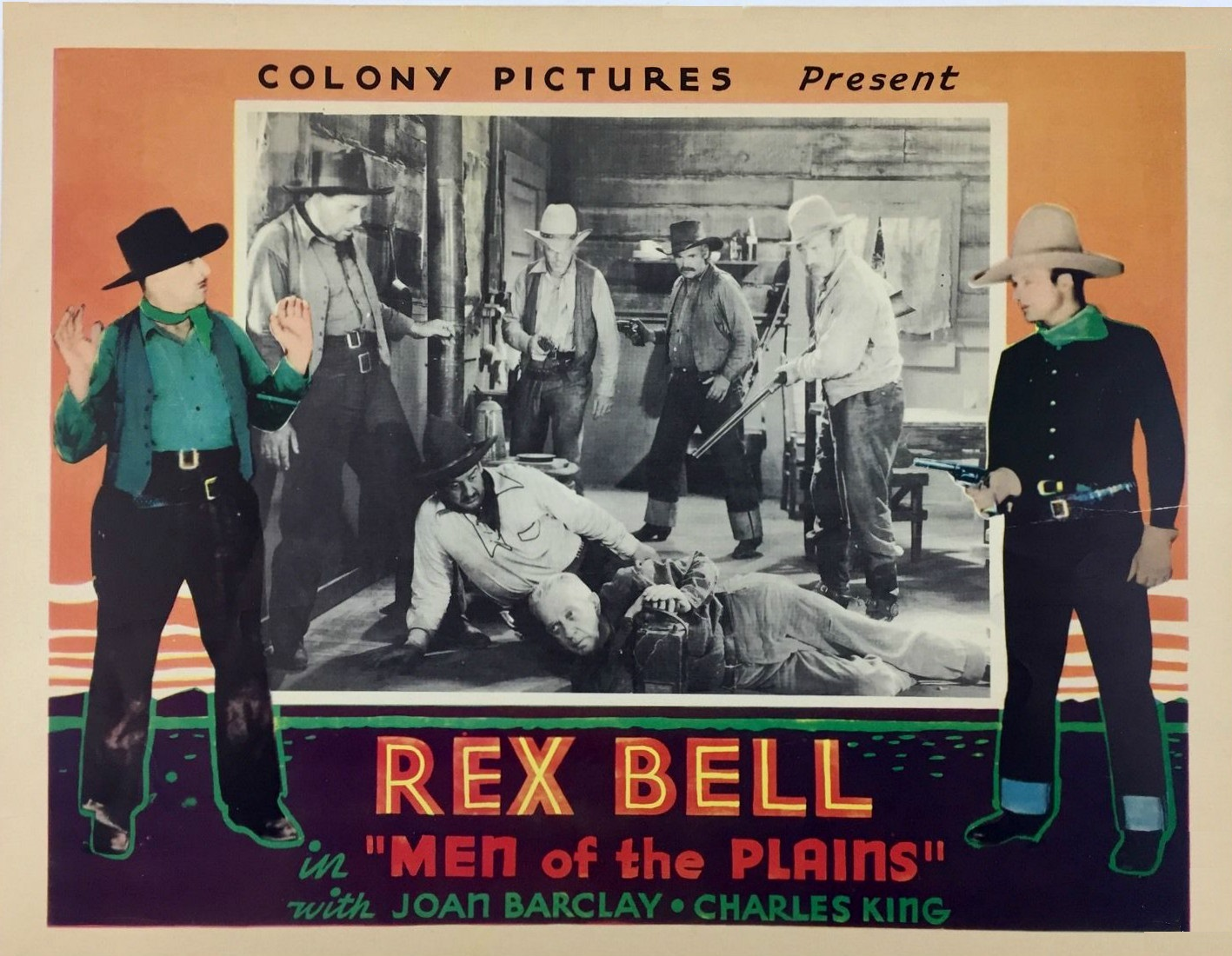
- Lobby card for Men of the Plains (1936) with Roger Williams and Rex Bell
- Born: Roger Grimes Williams; February 8, 1898; Denver, Colorado, United States
- Died: December 18, 1964 (aged 66); Los Angeles, California, United States
- Occupation: Actor
- Years active: 1933–1939
- Spouse(s): Vera Paloma Bennett (1916–17); Ruby B. Noe (1920-?); Ellen C. Williams (?-1964 (his death))

Roger Grimes Williams (February 8, 1898 – December 18, 1964) was an American actor of the 1930s. Born on February 8, 1898, in Denver, Colorado, his family moved to the Los Angeles area during the early 1900s. He served in the U.S. Army during World War I, being awarded several decorations. Married several times, he entered the film industry in the early 1930s, where he worked for several years. Married three times, he had a short film career during the 1930s, after which not much is known of his life, until his death in Los Angeles in 1964.

== Early life ==
Williams was born in Denver, Colorado, on February 8, 1898, to Charles H. Williams and Evangeline Lloyd. He was the oldest of seven children. By 1910 the family had moved to California, and were living Belvedere, which was in Los Angeles County. He enlisted in the army during the mid-1910s, lying about his age, which later caused some confusion about his true date of birth, which several sources still incorrectly report. Press releases during his film career claim that he was awarded the Purple Heart and the Croix de Guerre during World War I. He was married for the first time on June 6, 1916, to Vera Paloma Bennett of Utah. At the time, he claimed to be a motion picture actor, however no records can be found of his involvement in the film industry at this time. By the time he registered for the draft for World War I, he was already divorced from his first wife. In 1920 he married his second wife, Ruby B. Noe, in Salt Lake City, Utah, on February 7, 1920. By 1930, he had divorced and remarried for the third and final time, to his wife, Ellen, by which point the couple had two children. During the 1920s he worked as a tradesman in Los Angeles.

== Film career ==
Williams made his film debut in 1933, in a supporting role in Trouble Busters. During his time in films, he was given roles across the gamut of acting, from bit roles as in 1935's Saddle Aces, to supporting parts, as in Riders of the Whistling Skull, to starring roles as in Heroes of the Alamo. During his short 7-year career he appeared in over 100 films, the vast majority of them westerns.

== Personal life ==
Williams and his third wife, Ellen, had four children, two daughters (Waneta and Delores) and two sons (Roger and Arthur); he remained married to Ellen until his death in 1964. After leaving the film industry, he spent some time as an engineer for Douglas Aircraft. Williams died on December 18, 1964, in Los Angeles, California.

== Partial filmography ==
- Trouble Busters (1933)
- Range Warfare (1934)
- The Pecos Kid (1935)
- Wagon Trail (1935)
- Kentucky Blue Streak (1935)
- Rustler's Paradise (1935)
- Toll of the Desert (1935)
- Code of the Mounted (1935)
- Gun Play (1935)
- The Cheyenne Tornado (1935)
- Adventurous Knights (1935)
- Branded a Coward (1935)
- The Vanishing Riders (1935)
- No Man's Range (1935)
- Alias John Law (1935)
- The Reckless Buckaroo (1935)
- Trails of the Wild (1935)
- Saddle Aces (1935)
- Fighting Pioneers (1935)
- Frontier Justice (1935)
- Gun Smoke (1936)
- Timber War (1935)
- Ridin' On (1936)
- Step on It (1936)
- Feud of the West (1936)
- Desert Justice (1936)
- Gun Grit (1936)
- The Traitor (1936)
- Phantom Patrol (1936)
- Song of the Trail (1936)
- Aces Wild (1936)
- Vengeance of Rannah (1936)
- Law and Lead (1936)
- Wildcat Trooper (1936)
- Men of the Plains (1936)
- Wild Horse Round-Up (1936)
- Cheyenne Rides Again (1937)
- Riders of the Whistling Skull (1937)
- The Singing Buckaroo (1937)
- Santa Fe Rides (1937)
- The Silver Trail (1937)
- The Roaming Cowboy (1937)
- Bill Cracks Down (1937)
- Guns in the Dark (1937)
- Come On, Cowboys (1937)
- Brothers of the West (1937)
- Lost Ranch (1937)
- Heroes of the Alamo (1937)
- Trailin' Trouble (1937)
- Sky Racket (1937)
- Nation Aflame (1937)
- Zorro Rides Again (1937)
- Valley of Terror (1937)
- Call the Mesquiteers (1938)
- The Feud Maker (1938)
- Gang Bullets (1938)
- Red River Range (1938)
- Wolf Call (1939)
