= William Berke =

American film director

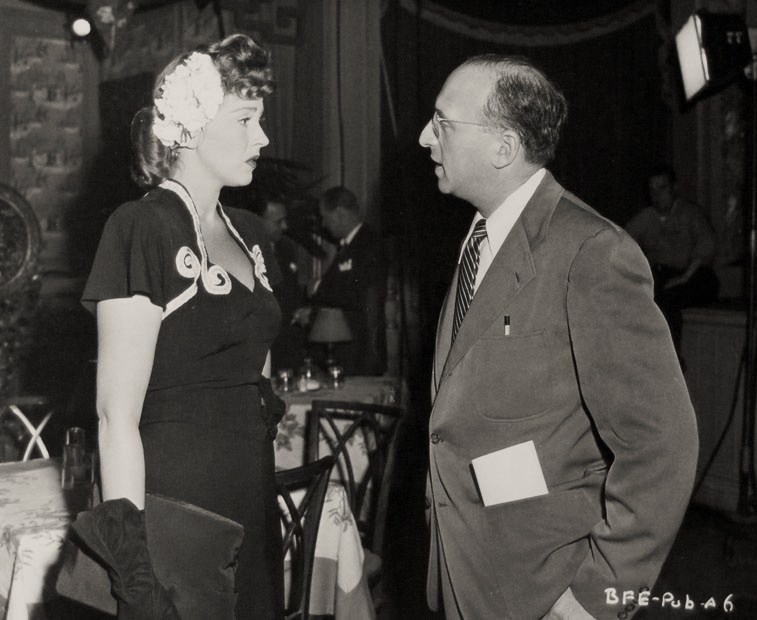
- Nancy Kelly and William Berke on the set of Betrayal from the East - publicity still, 1945
- Born: October 3, 1903; Milwaukee, United States
- Died: February 15, 1958 (aged 54); Los Angeles, United States
- Occupations: Film director, film producer, actor, screenwriter
- Years active: 1922–1958

William A. Berke (October 3, 1903 in Milwaukee, Wisconsin – February 15, 1958 in Los Angeles, California) was an American film director, film producer, actor and screenwriter. He wrote, directed, and/or produced some 200 films over a three-decade career.

== Biography ==
Berke broke into motion pictures in 1922 as a writer for silent westerns. For these assignments, he used the pseudonym William Lester. In the early 1930s, he formed a partnership with independent producer Bernard B. Ray to make feature films at Ray's Reliable Pictures studio, next door to Columbia Pictures. Berke, now using his own name for screen credits, was equally capable in making comedies, mysteries, action adventures, and westerns. In 1942, he joined Columbia, initially directing that studio's westerns with Charles Starrett and Russell Hayden, and then branching into more mainstream fare. In 1944, he moved to RKO Radio Pictures, handling a variety of movies, including detective fiction (Dick Tracy, The Falcon), musical comedies, and Zane Grey westerns.

His RKO colleague Richard Fleischer later recalled that William Berke "was known as King of the B's. For years and years he had made nothing but pictures with 10- or 12-day shooting schedules, minuscule budgets of about $100,000, and no stars. Without bothering with editing or any postproduction chores and with short shooting schedules, he was able to squeeze in eight or ten pictures a year. And he was going nuts." According to Fleischer, Berke eventually pestered RKO executives enough to be assigned an A picture with a long shooting schedule and stars, and he still shot it in twelve days.

William Berke also worked independently for the Pine-Thomas unit at Paramount, and then for producer Robert L. Lippert. Like many seasoned directors, Berke moved into television in the 1950s. He directed the 1954 comedy series Life with Elizabeth, starring Betty White.

Berke died in harness, suffering a heart attack on the set of The Lost Missile (1958); the film was completed by his son, Lester William Berke.

== Partial filmography ==
- The Double O (1921)
- The Firebrand (1922)
- The Crow's Nest (1922)
- Barb Wire (1922)
- Back Fire (1922)
- The Forbidden Trail (1923)
- Gallopin' Through (1923)
- The Love Pirate (1923)
- Wolf Tracks (1923)
- Gentle Julia (1923) (actor)
- Flashing Spurs (1924)
- The Back Trail (1924)
- Trigger Fingers (1924)
- Pioneer's Gold (1924)
- The Hellion (1924) (actor)
- The Terror of Pueblo (1924) (actor)
- Galloping Vengeance (1925) (writer)
- Riding Romance (1925) (writer)
- Barriers of the Law (1925) (writer)
- Unseen Enemies (1926) (writer)
- The Broncho Buster (1927) (writer)
- Hard Fists (1927) (writer)
- Rough and Ready (1927) (writer)
- Desert Dust (1927) (writer)
- The Fighting Three (1927) (writer)
- The Golden Stallion (1927) (story by)
- Straight Shootin' (1927) (story by)
- The Price of Fear (1928)
- The Flaming Signal (1933) (producer)
- The Woman Who Dared (1933) (producer)
- Social Error (1935) (producer)
- Adventurous Knights (1935) (producer)
- Rustler's Paradise (1935) (producer)
- Wagon Trail (1935) (producer)
- Aces Wild (1936) (producer)
- Confessions of Boston Blackie (1941) (producer)
- The Lone Prairie (1942) (director)
- Pardon My Gun (1942) (director)
- Law of the Northwest (1943) (director)
- Frontier Fury (1943) (director)
- Tornado (1943) (director)
- The Fighting Buckaroo (1943) (director)
- Minesweeper (1943) (director)
- Hail to the Rangers (1943) (director)
- Dangerous Passage (1944) (director)
- Riding West (1944) (director)
- Sailor's Holiday (1944) (director)
- Dark Mountain (1944) (Director)
- Betrayal from the East (1945) (director)
- High Powered (1945) (director)
- Dick Tracy (1945) (director)
- The Falcon's Alibi (1946) (producer)
- Sunset Pass (1946) (producer)
- Shoot to Kill (1947) (director and producer)
- Jungle Jim (1949)
- Treasure of Monte Cristo (1949) (director)
- On the Isle of Samoa (1950) (director)
- The Bandit Queen (1950) (director and producer)
- I Shot Billy the Kid (1950) (director)
- Roaring City (1951) (director)
- FBI Girl (1951) (director and producer)
- Kaadu (The Jungle) (1952) (director and producer)
- Four Boys and a Gun (1957)
- Street of Sinners (1957)
- Island Women (1958)
- Cop Hater (1958) (director and producer)
- The Mugger (1958) (director and producer)
