= Love Bug =

Lovebug is an insect in the march fly family.

(The) Love bug(s), Love Bug(s), or Lovebug(s) may also refer to:

== Films ==
- The Love Bug (1925 film), an Our Gang short
- The Love Bug, a 1968 Disney film about a sentient Volkswagen Beetle
- The Love Bug (1997 film), a television film sequel to the 1968 film
- The Love Bugs, a 1917 film starring Oliver Hardy

== Music ==
=== Albums ===
- Love Bug (Reuben Wilson album), 1969
- Love Bug (George Jones album), 1966
- Love Bug (Raffi), 2014

=== Songs ===
- "Lovebug" (Jonas Brothers song), 2008
- "Love Bug" (George Jones song), 1965, later covered in 1994 by George Strait
- "The Love Bug" (song), a 2004 song by M-Flo that features BoA
- "Love Bug", a song by GFriend from their 2018 album Time for the Moon Night
- "Love Bug", a song by Marcy Playground from their 1999 album Shapeshifter
- "Love Bug", a 1977 song written by Ron Roker for Tina Charles

== Television ==
=== Episodes ===
- "Love Bug", Driven Crazy episode 9 (1998)
- "Love Bug", Niña Niño episode 163 (2022)
- "Love Bug", Smart Guy season 3, episode 3 (1998)
- "Love Bug", The Bernie Mac Show season 3, episode 6 (2004)
- "Love Bug", The Stu Erwin Show season 2, episode 15 (1952)
- "Love, Bug", WordWorld season 2, episode 1b (2009)
- "Love Bugs", Adventure Time: Side Quests episode 17 (2026)
- "Love Bugs", The Marvelous Misadventures of Flapjack season 1, episode 14b (2009)
- "Love Bugs", RoboRoach season 3, episode 16b (2004)
- "Lovebug", The Revolting World of Stanley Brown episode 10 (2012)
- "Lovebugs", Big Mouth season 5, episode 3 (2021)
- "The Love Bug", Aladdin season 2, episode 53 (1994)
- "The Love Bug", Felicity season 2, episode 6 (1999)
- "The Love Bug", My Parents Are Aliens series 5, episode 9 (2005)
- "The Love Bug", Parker Lewis Can't Lose season 3, episode 14 (1993)
- "The Love Bugs", Saved by the Bell: The New Class season 2, episode 2 (1995)

=== Shows ===
- Herbie, the Love Bug (TV series), a 1982 American television series based on the Herbie film franchise
- Un gars, une fille, a 1997-2003 Canadian television series known as Love Bugs in Italy
- Love Bug (Philippine TV program), a 2010 Philippine television series
- Khatmal E Ishq (lit. 'Lovebug'), a 2016 Indian television series

== Other uses ==
- ILOVEYOU, a computer virus also known as the Love Bug worm
- Love Bug, a 1974 Volkswagen Beetle model marketed in North America

== See also ==
- "Love Bug Leave My Heart Alone", a 1967 song by Martha & the Vandellas
- "The Love Bug Will Bite You (If You Don't Watch Out)", a 1937 song by Pinky Tomlin
