= The Call of the Wild (1923 film) =

1923 film by Fred Jackman

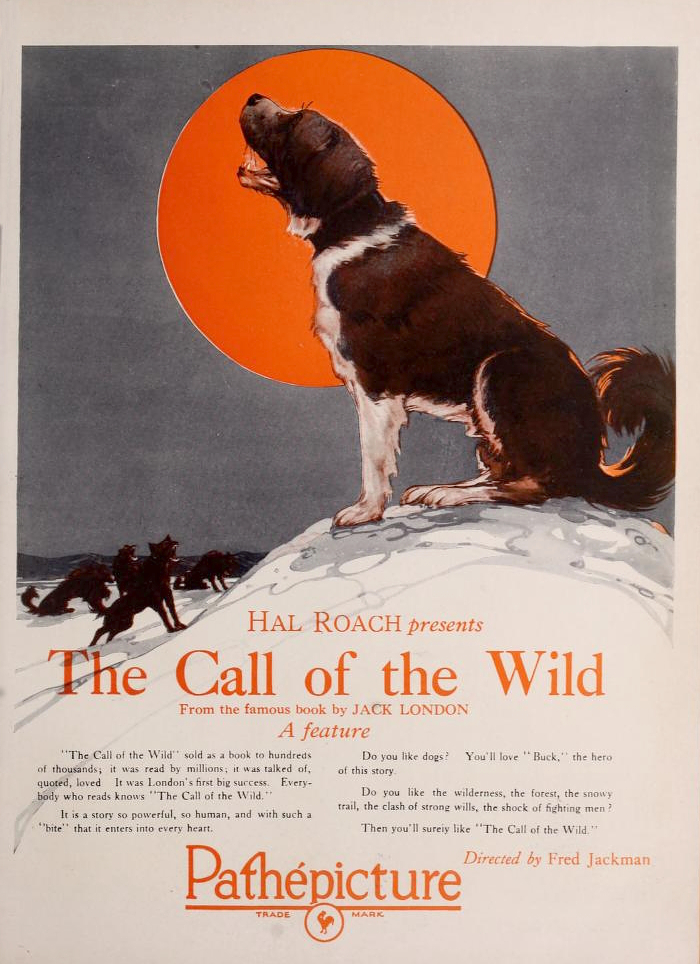
- Advertisement in Motion Picture News
- Directed by: Fred Jackman
- Written by: Fred Jackman
- Based on: The Call of the Wild by: Jack London
- Produced by: Hal Roach
- Starring: Jack Mulhall; Walter Long; Sidney D'Albrook; Buck the dog
- Cinematography: Floyd Jackman
- Production company: Hal Roach Studios
- Distributed by: Pathé Exchange
- Release date: September 23, 1923
- Running time: 7 reels
- Country: United States
- Language: Silent (English intertitles)

The Call of the Wild is an American silent adventure film based on the popular 1903 book by Jack London. The film was written and directed by Fred Jackman and produced by Hal Roach. The feature was released on September 23, 1923, and distributed by Pathé Exchange.

== Plot ==
The story opens with Buck as a puppy, being ushered into a happy family as a Christmas present for a little girl. He grows up a faithful and loving friend of the children until one day he is stolen and sold as a sled dog in the Klondike. Here, under cruel treatment, he learns many lessons and develops a keen dislike to the man who stole him and clubbed him into submission. One experience follows another for Buck until he finds a real friend in his last master to whom he proves his faithfulness in the climax.

== Cast ==
- Buck as Himself, a dog
- Jack Mulhall as John Thornton
- Walter Long as Hagin
- Sidney D'Albrook as Charles
- Laura Roessing as Mercedes, Charles's wife
- Frank Butler as Hal
- Lassie Lou Ahern as Baby girl
- Peggy Ahern in a bit part (uncredited)
- John Murphy
- Maurice Murphy

== Production ==
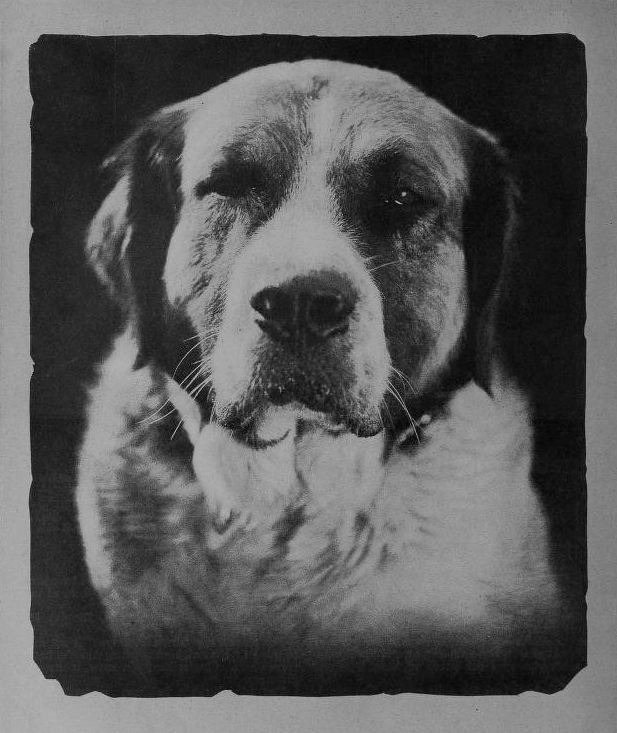
Buck, who was named after and also played the role of Buck in the film

The cinematographer for the film was Floyd Jackman, brother of director Fred Jackman, who was president of the American Society of Cinematographers at the time. Floyd and Fred filmed some of the scenes on location in Truckee, California and in Colorado. Truckee was one of Hollywood's favorite locations for filming during the early part of the 20th century, with close to a 100 movies and sequences being filmed there and in the surrounding area. The popular television series Bonanza filmed there as well. Truckee was often chosen for filming winter scenes, because of the area's similarity to the Alaskan wilderness. The 1935 film adaption of London's novel starring Clark Gable and Loretta Young filmed there as well on a special set constructed near Prosser Creek.

Sol Lesser is credited for discovering Buck, the animal star of the film. The story goes that several years before production began on the 1923 movie, the producer wanted to film an adaption of London's novel himself, but he knew of no dog that could play the hero Buck. Then one day he inadvertently ran across a full-blooded St. Bernard puppy, and realized that in a few years, this dog would grow up to be his Buck. So he purchased the dog and gave him the name and turned him over to a trainer. It was not reported why Lesser did not end up making the feature himself, instead of Roach. In London's book, Buck is described as a St. Bernard-Scotch Collie mix.

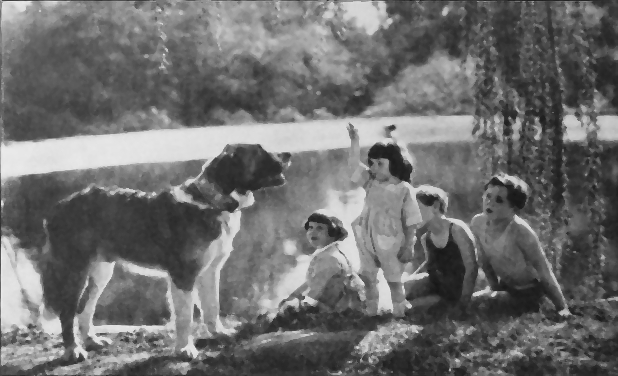
A group of children with Buck in a scene from the movie

== Reviews and reception ==
During its two-week run at the Cameo Theater in New York, reviews in the local newspapers were unanimous in praising the film. The Evening Sun called the film "a very effective picture version" of London's novel and noted the "settings are very well done". The Evening Post said it was "a stirring series of pictures of the bleak wastes of snow and ice of the frozen North...and has many sensational scenes". Joseph Mulvaney of The New York American alluded to the animal star of the movie, saying "Buck is natural and he acts more as a result of instinct than training, and he is all the more lovable for it". The Evening Mail said it was an "excellent picture" and "its realism is heightened by many snow scenes". Helen Pollock wrote in The Telegraph that "Hal Roach evidently prefers the temperamental qualities of children and animals to those of adult actors. At all events he certainly performs marvels in his chosen field, and in no recent productions has he been happier than in his results with the dog actor, 'Buck', who is the star of the London story".

Majestic theater lobby in Portland, Oregon, advertising film, c. 1924

The movie fared just as well on the west coast in its showing there. The California Theatre extended its run of the feature after the first week due to increased attendance. Reviews in local newspapers at the time expressed their approval of the film; James Gruen of The Examiner wrote, "It is a fitting tribute to London who, at his height, was the most important literary force in America, that his magnum opus is translated to the screen as this one...has been". Pearl Rall opined in The Evening Express that "Hal Roach is to be commended for the ownership of so beautiful and noble a creature as 'Buck' he is to be congratulated...that many approved the manner in which he has caught the story was shown by applause at intervals and laughter at its comedy". The Daily Times critic Edwin Schallert admitted that he was "fascinated by these pictures in which animals play the leading roles...the dog who plays the hero is a very good dog indeed. Several times, as a matter of fact, he was rewarded with applause, and I have no doubt that many of the audience felt that for his performance he should have been tendered a whole stack of bones".

== Preservation ==
Prints of The Call of the Wild are archived at the Museum of Modern Art.
