= Blazing Guns =

Blazing Guns may refer to:

- Blazing Guns (1943 film), an American Western film directed by Robert Emmett Tansey
- Blazing Guns (1935 film), an American Western film directed by Ray Heinz
