= Lightning Triggers =

1935 film

- Directed by: S. Roy Luby
- Written by: Oliver Drake; Eric Howard
- Produced by: Willis Kent
- Starring: Reb Russell; Yvonne Pelletier; Fred Kohler
- Cinematography: Harvey Gould
- Edited by: S. Roy Luby
- Production company: Willis Kent Productions
- Distributed by: Marcy Pictures
- Release date: July 1935
- Running time: 58 minutes
- Country: United States
- Language: English

Lightning Triggers is a 1935 American Western film directed by S. Roy Luby and starring Reb Russell, Yvonne Pelletier and Fred Kohler.

== Plot ==
An undercover agent for the Cattleman's Protective Association goes into the hideout of rustler chief Bull Thompson (Fred Kohler) posing as an outlaw.

== Cast ==
- Reb Russell as Reb Russell
- Yvonne Pelletier as Marion
- Fred Kohler as Bull Thompson
- Jack Rockwell as Butch Greer
- Edmund Cobb as Blackie
- Lillian Castle as Minerva Thompson
- Jerry Meacham as The Kid - Safecracker
- Dick Botiller as Juan - Henchman
- William McCall as Sheriff Tom
- Olin Francis as Deputy Ed
- Lew Meehan as Henchman
- Artie Ortego as Henchman
- Victor Adamson as Barfly

== Bibliography ==
- Michael R. Pitts. Poverty Row Studios, 1929–1940: An Illustrated History of 55 Independent Film Companies, with a Filmography for Each. McFarland & Company, 2005.
