= The Lost Express =

1926 film

- Directed by: J.P. McGowan
- Produced by: Morris R. Schlank
- Starring: Helen Holmes; Jack Mower; Henry A. Barrows
- Production company: Morris R. Schlank Productions
- Distributed by: Rayart Pictures
- Release date: August 15, 1926
- Running time: 48 minutes
- Country: United States
- Languages: Silent; English intertitles

The Lost Express is a 1926 American silent mystery film directed by J.P. McGowan and starring Helen Holmes, Jack Mower, and Henry A. Barrows.

== Cast ==
- Helen Holmes as Helen Martin
- Jack Mower as Alvin Morgan
- Henry A. Barrows as John Morgan
- Fred Church as Arthur Standish
- Elita Proctor Otis as Mrs. Arthur Standish
- Lassie Lou Ahern as Baby Alice Standish
- Eddie Barry as Valentine Peabody
- Martin Turner as George Washington Jones
- J. P. McGowan as Train Engineer (uncredited)
- Slim Whitaker as Thug (uncredited)

== Bibliography ==
- Munden, Kenneth White. The American Film Institute Catalog of Motion Pictures Produced in the United States, Part 1. University of California Press, 1997.
