= Dick Botiller =

American actor (1896–1953)

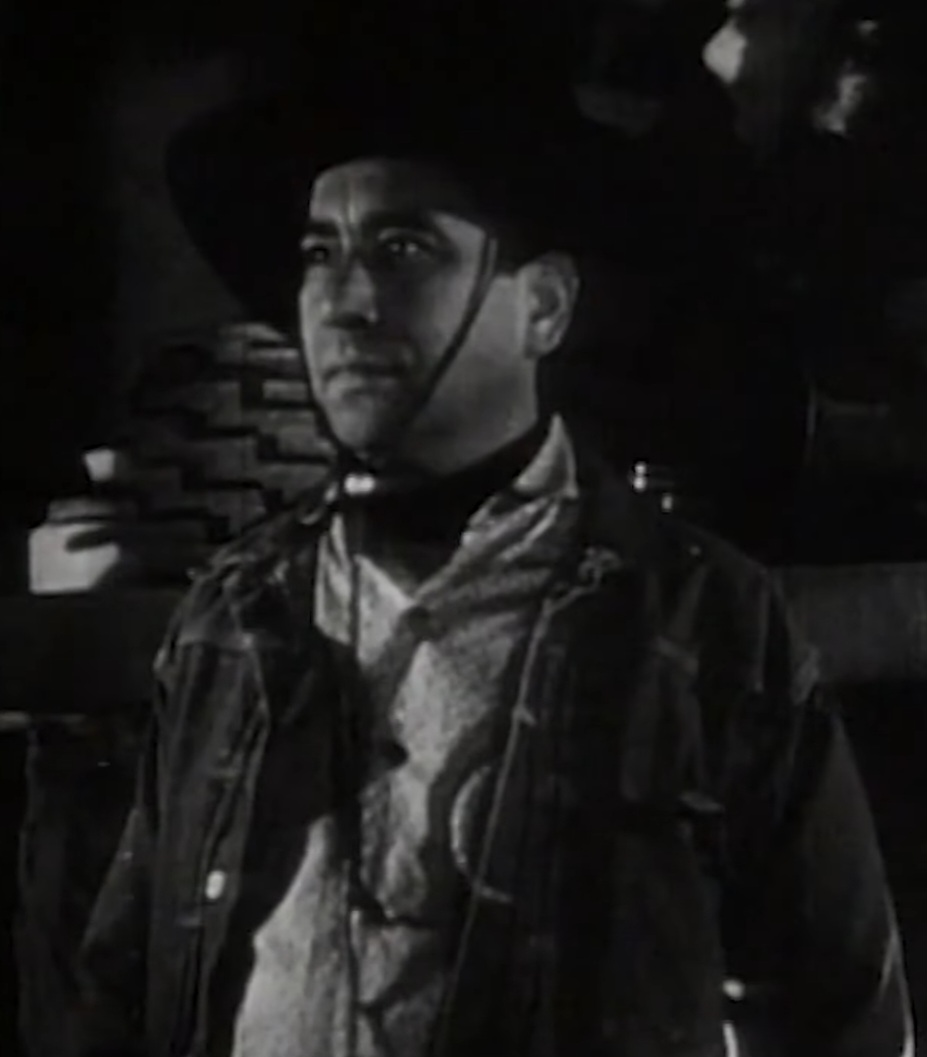
- Botiller in The Yellow Rose of Texas (1944)
- Born: Richard Edward Botiller; October 26, 1896; Bakersfield, California, U.S.
- Died: March 24, 1953 (aged 56); Ridgecrest, California, U.S.
- Resting place: Arroyo Grande Cemetery, Arroyo Grande, California
- Occupation: Actor
- Years active: 1933–1952

Richard Edward Botiller (October 26, 1896 – March 24, 1953) was an American character actor of the 1930s and 1940s. While most of his roles were un-credited, many of them nameless as well, he was given more substantial roles occasionally.

== Life and career ==
Botiller was born on October 26, 1896, in Bakersfield, California. He entered the film industry in 1933, debuting with an unnamed, un-credited role in the western, Silent Men. During the 1930s and 1940s Botiller appeared in over 150 films, film shorts, and film serials. He often played as henchmen or Indians.

Some of his more notable roles include: as Little Feather in Range Warfare (1934); as Felipe Farley in the 1935 western Cheyenne Tornado; as Bald Eagle in 1936's West of Nevada; as Hernandez in Torrid Zone (1940); as Nardo in the 1940 crime drama Dark Streets of Cairo; and as Indian Pete in The Yellow Rose of Texas;

Other notable films in which Botiller appeared include: the classic war drama, The Charge of the Light Brigade, starring Errol Flynn and Olivia de Havilland, in which he played a native; as an Indian in Cecil B. DeMille's historical drama, Union Pacific, starring Barbara Stanwyck and Joel McCrea; as a tourist in the 1939 drama, Only Angels Have Wings, starring Cary Grant and Jean Arthur, which is considered to be one of Howard Hawks' finest films; as a warrior in the Bob Hope and Bing Crosby comedy classic, Road to Morocco (1942); in the classic World War I drama, For Whom the Bell Tolls (1943), starring Gary Cooper and Ingrid Bergman, in which he played a sergeant; as a native officer in the classic World War II romance, Casablanca, starring Humphrey Bogart and Ingrid Bergman; as an aide in the 1944 version of Kismet, starring Ronald Colman; and in as an unnamed character in one of his final roles in Humphrey Bogart's 1951 drama, Sirocco. Botiller's final appearance was as a cattleman (un-credited) in the 1952 western Smoky Canyon, one of Charles Starrett's Durango Kid films.

In addition to his feature work, Botiller also appeared in numerous film serials, including: in several different roles in 1934's The Return of Chandu, starring Béla Lugosi; as Cottonwood in The Miracle Rider (1935), starring Tom Mix; as a phantom raider in The Great Adventures of Wild Bill Hickok (1938), starring Bill Elliott; as Yellow Snake in The Oregon Trail (1939), starring Johnny Mack Brown; as Krause in the 1942 serial Captain Midnight, starring Dave O'Brien.

Botiller died on March 24, 1953, in Ridgecrest, California. He was buried in Arroyo Grande Cemetery, Arroyo Grande, California.

== Selected filmography ==
- The Man Trailer (1934)
- Wild Mustang (1935)
- Lightning Triggers (1935)
- Outlaw Rule (1935)
- Gun Play (1935)
- Million Dollar Haul (1935)
- The Cheyenne Tornado (1935)
- Arizona Bad Man (1935)
- The Traitor (1936)
- Gun Smoke (1936)
- South of Arizona (1938)
- Pioneer Trail (1938)
- The Pinto Kid (1941)
- Dizzy Detectives (1943)
- The Return of the Durango Kid (1945)
- Smoky Canyon (1952)
