= Cradle Robbers =

1924 film

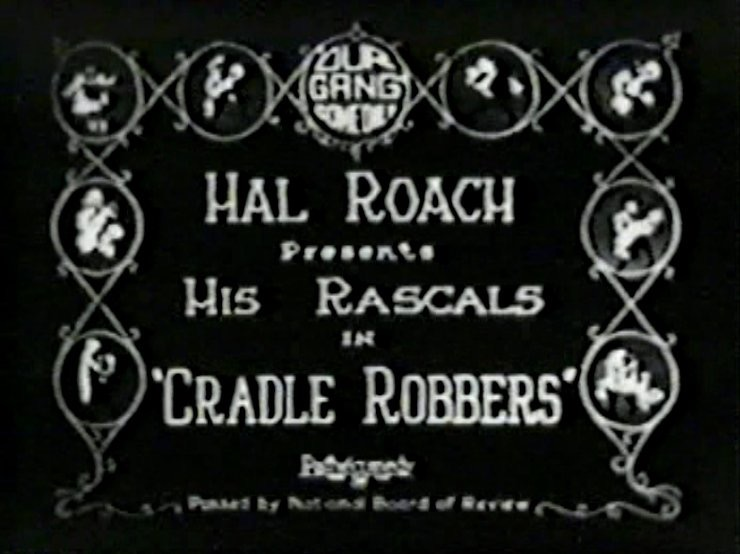
- Intertitle
- Directed by: Robert F. McGowan
- Written by: Hal Roach; H. M. Walker
- Produced by: Hal Roach
- Starring: Mickey Daniels; Jackie Condon; Ernie Morrison; Mary Kornman; Joe Cobb; Allen Hoskins; Dick Henchen; Pal the Dog; Lassie Lou Ahern; Peggy Ahern; Jannie Hoskins; Lyle Tayo
- Cinematography: Blake Wagner
- Edited by: T. J. Crizer
- Distributed by: Pathé Exchange
- Release date: June 1, 1924
- Running time: 20 minutes
- Country: United States
- Languages: Silent; English intertitles

Cradle Robbers is a 1924 short silent comedy film directed by Robert F. McGowan. It was the 26th Our Gang short subject to be released.

== Synopsis ==
The boys cannot go fishing because they have to take care of their baby brothers and sisters. After trying unsuccessfully to sell their babies to some traveling gypsies, Mary shows up and tells them that her little sister just won a prize at the baby show.

The boys decide to enter their babies in the show, only to discover that all the prizes are gone except the one for the fattest baby. Mickey comes up with the idea to enter Joe as a baby. After Joe escapes, the gang decides to make their own baby show. When the parents discover their babies are missing they assume that the gypsies stole them. When the gang finds out that their parents are after them, they hide in the gypsy wagon, which drives off. As the police and parents chase the wagon down the street, the babies start falling off the wagon and the parents stop and pick them up as they continue running.

The adults finally catch up with the wagon, the gypsy is arrested, and the kids reunited with their parents.

== Production notes ==
Cradle Robbers marked the final appearance of Ernie Morrison as "Sunshine Sammy." It also marked the first appearance of Peggy Ahern.

The early scene of gang entertaining their younger siblings with fishing poles was reworked in 1933's Forgotten Babies.

When the silent Pathé ‘’Our Gang’’ comedies were syndicated for television as "The Mischief Makers" in 1960, Cradle Robbers was retitled The Baby Show. Two-thirds of the original film was included.

== Cast ==
=== The Gang ===
- Joe Cobb — Joe
- Jackie Condon — Jackie
- Mickey Daniels — Mickey
- Allen Hoskins — Farina
- Mary Kornman — Mary
- Ernie Morrison — Sunshine Sammy
- Dick Henchen — Dick
- Sonny Loy — Sing Joy
- Pal the Dog — Himself

=== Additional cast ===
- Lassie Lou Ahern — little girl in attic
- Peggy Ahern — girl at baby show
- Jannie Hoskins — Ernie and Farina's sister
- Gabe Saienz — boy at baby show
- Allan Cavan – police officer/baby show official
- Beth Darlington – woman with bald boyfriend
- William Gillespie – officer chasing Joe/Gypsy
- Helen Gilmore – Jackie's mother
- Clara Guiol – baby show official
- Lyle Tayo – angry mother
- Dorothy Vernon – angry mother
