= The Last of the Clintons =

1935 film

- Directed by: Harry L. Fraser
- Written by: Harry L. Fraser
- Produced by: William Berke
- Starring: Harry Carey; Betty Mack; Victor Potel
- Cinematography: Robert E. Cline
- Edited by: Arthur A. Brooks
- Music by: Lee Zahler
- Production company: William Berke Productions
- Distributed by: Ajax Pictures
- Release date: November 12, 1935
- Running time: 59 minutes
- Country: United States
- Language: English

The Last of the Clintons is a 1935 American western film directed by Harry L. Fraser and starring Harry Carey, Betty Mack and Victor Potel. It was the last film released by the Poverty Row studio Ajax Pictures before it closed down.

== Plot ==
Adventurer Trigger Carson unexpectedly comes across gold prospector Jed, the last of the Clintons, and assists him in his battle against a local gang of cattle rustlers.

== Cast ==
- Harry Carey as Trigger Carson
- Betty Mack as Edith Elkins
- Del Gordon as Marty Todd
- Victor Potel as Jed Clinton
- Earl Dwire as Pete - Henchman
- Ruth Findlay as Lorrie
- Tom London as Luke Todd
- Slim Whitaker as Jim Elkins
- William McCall as Ed Carney
- Allen Greer as Frank Smith
- Lafe McKee as Sam Slater
- Pat Harmon as Lefty
- Lew Meehan as Bartender
- Tex Palmer as Henchman
- Barney Beasley as Barfly

== Bibliography ==
- Pitts, Michael R. Poverty Row Studios, 1929–1940. McFarland & Company, 2005.
