= Outlaw Rule =

1935 film

- Directed by: S. Roy Luby
- Written by: E.B. Mann
- Produced by: Willis Kent
- Starring: Reb Russell; Betty Mack; Al Bridge
- Cinematography: James Diamond
- Edited by: S. Roy Luby
- Production company: Willis Kent Productions
- Distributed by: Willis Kent Productions
- Release date: February 1935
- Running time: 53 minutes
- Country: United States
- Language: English

Outlaw Rule is a 1935 American Western film directed by S. Roy Luby and starring Reb Russell, Betty Mack and Al Bridge.

== Cast ==
- Reb Russell as Reb Russell
- Betty Mack as Kay Lathrop
- Al Bridge as Deputy Bat Lindstrom
- Yakima Canutt as Blaze Tremaine
- John McGuire as Danny Taylor
- Henry Hall as Link Bishop
- Ralph Lewis as John Lathrop
- Joseph W. Girard as Banker Payton
- Jack Rockwell as The Whistler
- Jack Kirk as Tubby Jones
- Olin Francis as Jim - Bartender
- Murdock MacQuarrie as Coroner Williamson
- Marin Sais as Mrs. Turk
- Lew Meehan as Barfly
- Dick Botiller as Henchman

== Bibliography ==
- Michael R. Pitts. Poverty Row Studios, 1929–1940: An Illustrated History of 55 Independent Film Companies, with a Filmography for Each. McFarland & Company, 2005.
