= Olin Francis =

American actor (1891–1952)

Olin Caldwell Francis (September 13, 1891 in Mooreville, Mississippi – June 30, 1952 in Hollywood, California) was an American actor.

Francis graduated in engineering from the University of Mississippi and acted on stage before he went to Hollywood. He was one of the founders of the Screen Actors Guild. He performed in silent films, including melodramas, romances and Westerns. He starred in a few films early in his career, but he more frequently had smaller parts such as a deputy sheriff, a henchman, or a member of a posse. His films included The Kid Brother (1927), Fightin' Devil (1922), and A Knight of the West (1921).

On June 30, 1952, Francis died at Culver City Hospital, aged 60.

== Selected filmography ==
- Hell's Hinges (1916)
- Walloping Wallace (1924)
- Let's Go, Gallagher (1925)
- The Call of the Klondike (1926)
- The Flying U Ranch (1927)
- Born to Battle (1927)
- Stormy Waters (1928)
- Free Lips (1928)
- The Law of the Tong (1931)
- Air Eagles (1931)
- Lariats and Six-Shooters (1931)
- Out of Singapore (1932)
- The Wyoming Whirlwind (1932)
- Battling Buckaroo (1932)
- 45 Calibre Echo (1932)
- Tex Takes a Holiday (1932)
- Lightning Range (1933)
- Hard Rock Harrigan (1935)
- Lightning Triggers (1935)
- Outlaw Rule (1935)
- I Conquer the Sea! (1936)
- Taming the Wild (1936)
- Rough Riding Rhythm (1937)
- Two Gun Justice (1938)
