= The Man from Oklahoma =

1945 film by Frank McDonald

- Directed by: Frank McDonald
- Written by: John K. Butler
- Produced by: Louis Gray
- Starring: Roy Rogers; Dale Evans; George 'Gabby' Hayes
- Cinematography: William Bradford
- Edited by: Tony Martinelli
- Music by: Mort Glickman
- Production company: Republic Pictures
- Distributed by: Republic Pictures
- Release date: July 1, 1945
- Running time: 68 minutes
- Country: United States
- Language: English

The Man from Oklahoma is a 1945 American Western film directed by Frank McDonald and starring Roy Rogers, Dale Evans and George 'Gabby' Hayes. It was produced and distributed by Republic Pictures.

== Plot ==
Jim Gardner, hoping to acquire the Pine Valley section around Cherokee City, Oklahoma, for the oil rights, instigates and renews an old-time feud between the Lanes and the Whittakers as each family owns half the valley. Roy Rogers and the Sons of the Pioneers take up the fight against Gardner and manage to settle the Lane-Whittaker feud.

== Cast ==
- Roy Rogers as Roy
- Dale Evans as Peggy Lane
- George "Gabby" Hayes as Gabby Whitaker
- Roger Pryor as Jim Gardner
- Trigger as Trigger
- Arthur Loft as J. J. Cardigan
- Maude Eburne as Grandma Lane
- Sam Flint as Mayor Witherspoon
- Si Jenks as Jeff Whittaker
- June Gittelson as Little Bird on the Wing
- Elaine Lange as Secretary Vera
- Charles Soldani as Chief Red Feather
- Edmund Cobb as Henchman Ferguson
- George Sherwood as Henchman Slade
- Eddie Kane as Bill - Club Manager
- Sons of the Pioneers as Musicians

== Bibliography ==
- Hurst, Richard M. Republic Studios: Beyond Poverty Row and the Majors. Scarecrow Press, 2007.
- Pitts, Michael R. Western Movies: A Guide to 5,105 Feature Films. McFarland, 2012.
