= Fighting to Live =

1934 film by Edward F. Cline

- Directed by: Edward F. Cline
- Written by: Robert Ives (story and screenplay)
- Produced by: Sol Lesser (producer)
- Starring: See below
- Cinematography: Frank B. Good
- Edited by: Carl Himm
- Music by: Lee Zahler
- Production company: Principal Pictures
- Distributed by: Principal Pictures
- Release date: May 6, 1934
- Running time: 60 minutes
- Country: United States
- Language: English

Fighting to Live is a 1934 American Pre-Code western film directed by Edward F. Cline.

== Plot ==
Captain and Lady, two police dogs, are muzzled and abandoned on the plains by a criminal. They retreat to the hills and use their skills to survive, eventually saving a man's life.

== Cast ==
- Marion Shilling as Mary Carson
- Steve Pendleton as John Z. Blake
- Lafayette Russell as Reb Collins, Mail-Coach Driver
- Eddie Phillips as Joe Gilmore
- Lloyd Ingraham as Judge Simmons
- Henry Hall as Endicott
- John Ince as Jake - Prosecuting Attorney
- Bruce Mitchell as Charlie, the Bailiff
