= Fast Company (1924 film) =

1924 American short film

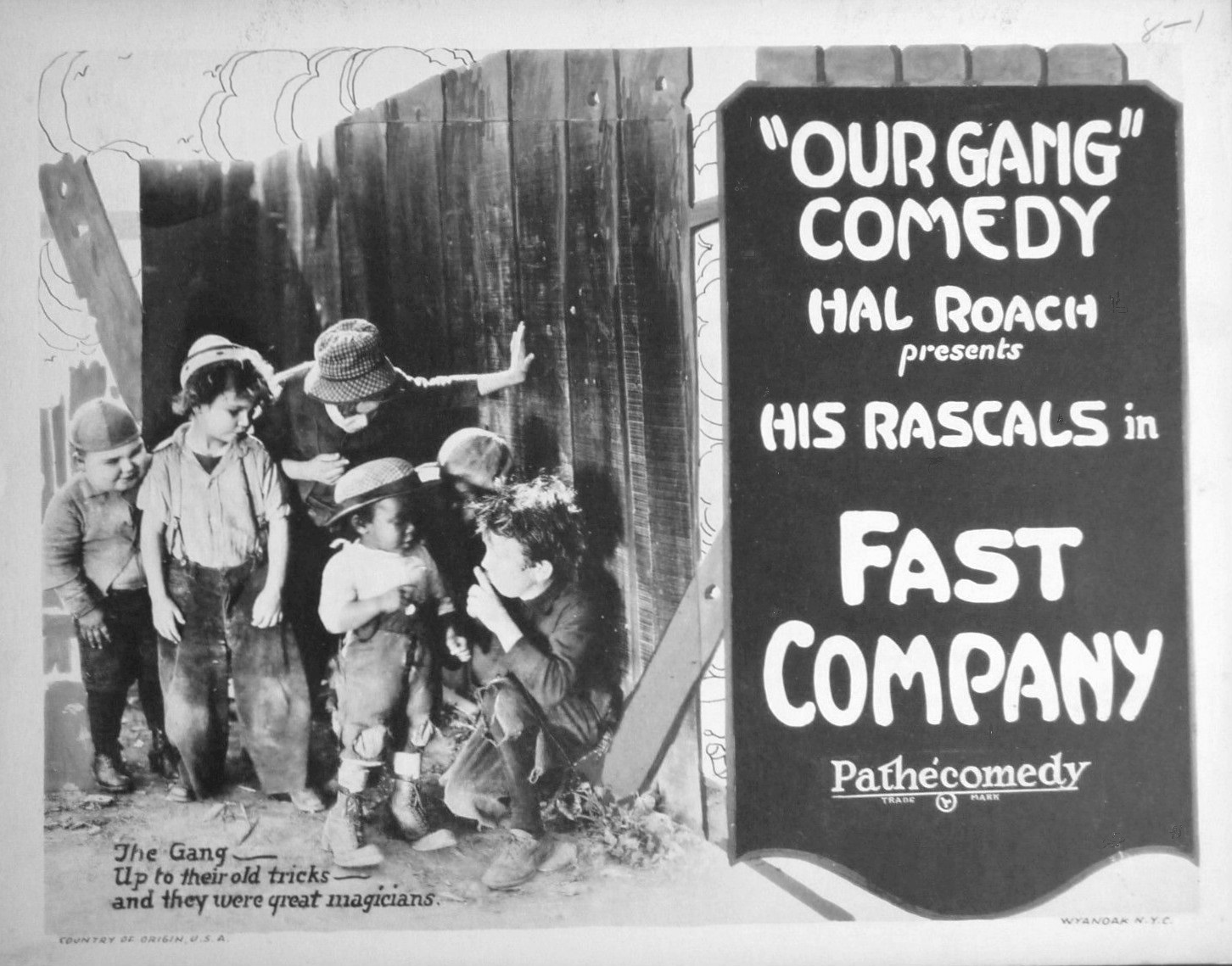
- Directed by: Robert F. McGowan; Charles Parrott
- Written by: Hal Roach; H. M. Walker
- Produced by: Hal Roach
- Starring: Joe Cobb; Jackie Condon; Mickey Daniels; Allen Hoskins; Jack Davis; Mary Kornman; Ernie Morrison; Dinah the Mule; Lassie Lou Ahern; Hal Roach, Jr. Walter Wilkinson; Charles A. Bachman; Helen Gilmore; Charlie Hall
- Edited by: T. J. Crizer
- Distributed by: Pathé Exchange
- Release date: November 16, 1924
- Running time: 20 minutes
- Country: United States
- Languages: Silent; English intertitles

Fast Company is a 1924 short silent comedy film directed by Robert F. McGowan. It was the 32nd Our Gang short subject to be released.

== Plot ==
Mickey trades places with a little rich boy, who is staying at a ritzy hotel. Mayhem ensues when the gang invades the hotel to look for Mickey and discover the snooty society ladies, a mischievous monkey, and a fireworks salesman. Later, the gang dress up as cannibals and organize a mock-tribal ritual.

== Production notes ==
Regular Our Gang director Robert F. McGowan was injured in a fall after a camera platform collapsed, rendering him unable to work for several months. Director Charles Parrott stepped in for the ailing McGowan but was called away to New York City to address corporate matters and the unfinished film was shelved indefinitely. McGowan eventually resurrected production and completed the film nearly a year later. This resulted in appearances from Our Gang members Ernie Morrison and Jack Davis who had already left the series but returned to complete Fast Company.

When the silent Pathé Our Gang comedies were syndicated for television as "The Mischief Makers" in 1960, Fast Company was retitled The Big Switch.

== Cast ==
=== The Gang ===
- Joe Cobb — Joe
- Jackie Condon — Jackie McChicken
- Mickey Daniels — Mickey
- Allen Hoskins — Farina
- Jack Davis — Jack McChicken
- Mary Kornman — Mary
- Ernie Morrison — Ernie
- Dinah the Mule

=== Additional cast ===
- Lassie Lou Ahern — Mary's sister
- Hal Roach Jr. — boy teasing Farina
- Walter Wilkinson — Rondamere Von Swell
- Charles A. Bachman — police officer
- Helen Gilmore — Traveler's Aid Society woman
- Charlie Hall — bellboy
- Del Henderson — hotel guest
- Lyle Tayo — hotel guest
- Charley Young — man falling out of a window
