= Lassie Lou Ahern =

American actress (1920–2018)

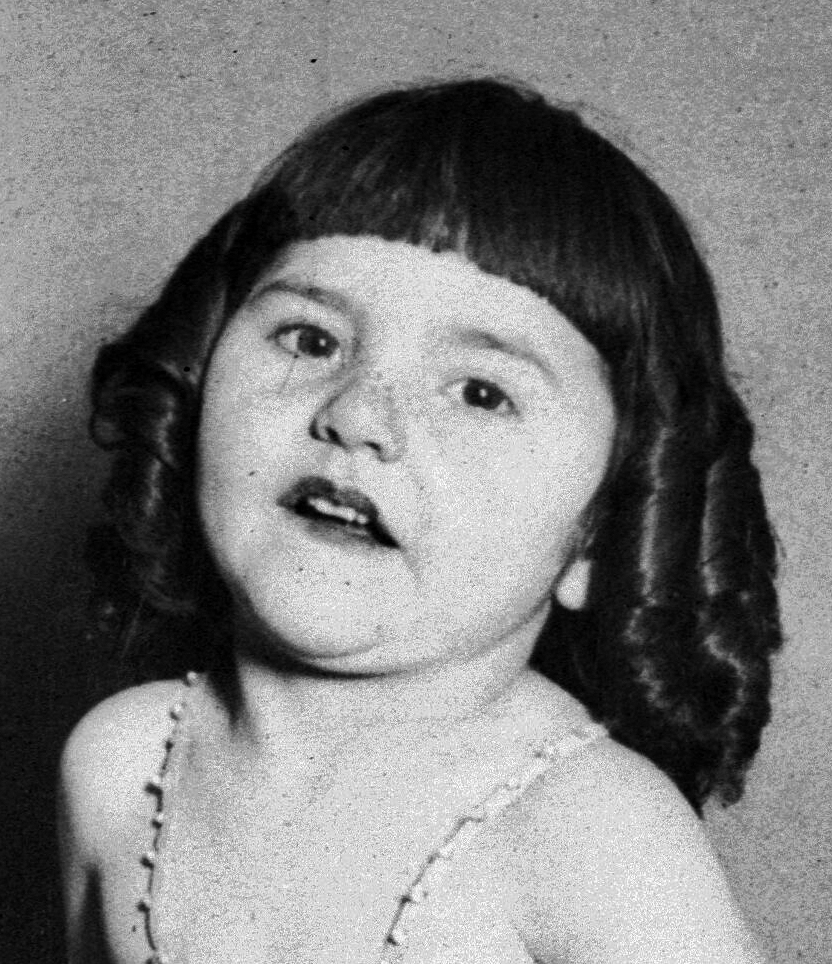
- Ahern in the mid-1920s
- Born: June 25, 1920; Los Angeles, California, U.S.
- Died: February 15, 2018 (aged 97); Prescott, Arizona, U.S.
- Occupation: Actress
- Years active: 1923–1975
- Relatives: Peggy Ahern (sister)

Lassie Lou Ahern (June 25, 1920 – February 15, 2018) was an American actress. Originally discovered by Will Rogers, she was best known for her role as Little Harry in the 1927 silent film Uncle Tom's Cabin and also for her recurring appearances in the Our Gang films. Except for "Baby Peggy", Ahern was the last living performer who had a substantial career during Hollywood's silent era.

== Early life ==
Ahern was born on June 25, 1920, in Los Angeles, California, the daughter of Fred and Elizabeth Wilson Ahern. She was the third in a family of four children; one of her siblings was Peggy Ahern.

== Career ==
Ahern got her acting career started in 1923 in the silent film The Call of the Wild, produced by Hal Roach. It was the first full-length motion picture made at his studio. Also making her first screen appearance was her older sister Peggy Ahern. It was the actor Will Rogers who recommended that Ahern's father put Ahern and her sister in show business. She appeared in numerous Our Gang films with Hal Roach Studios, including Cradle Robbers, and was one of the last surviving Our Gang members.

Before coming under contract at Universal, Ahern freelanced and appeared in a variety of wide-ranging productions. She appeared in five Will Rogers comedies, including Jubilo, Jr. (1923) and Going to Congress (1924), as well as in Charley Chase shorts like Sweet Daddy (1924), The Family Entrance (1925), and His Wooden Wedding (1925). Like most child actors she not only had a flair for comedy, but also for melodrama and actioners, too. In her work with female action figure Helen Holmes, Ahern, like Holmes, did her own dangerous stunts, particularly in Webs of Steel (1925), but also in The Lost Express (1925). Besides serials and one-reel comedies, her work extended to both independent features as well as A-list motion pictures for the major studios. Her versatility allowed her to work with some of the leading film artists of the decade: Ronald Colman and Vilma Banky in The Dark Angel (1925), John Ford in Thank You (1925), Norma Shearer and Renée Adorée in Excuse Me (1925), Leatrice Joy in Hell's Highroad (1925), Ivan Mozzhukhin (notable for being his only appearance in an American film) and Mary Philbin in Surrender! (1927), Jetta Goudal in The Forbidden Woman (1927), and Jobyna Ralston in Little Mickey Grogan (1927).

In 1927, Universal Studios was in the process of making Uncle Tom's Cabin. Not satisfied with the boys who auditioned for the role as Little Harry, her agent suggested that she try out for the part. Her acting in the film, which involved an 18-month engagement with filming on the Mississippi River as well at Universal studios, turned out to be a success, and she won the best reviews of her career. Despite this, her career as a child actress ended the same year, with Little Mickey Grogan being her last silent film and her only movie to feature her in a starring role (alongside Frankie Darro). A crowdfunding campaign was started in 2016 to finance a restoration project for the film, following a similar campaign in 2015 to acquire a digital copy of Little Mickey Grogan in Paris. At the request of Cecil B. DeMille, Ahern was asked to test for the role as the Blind Girl in his 1927 biblical epic The King of Kings, but she turned down the part as Ahern's father pulled his daughters from Hollywood acting owing to his belief that pictures had turned too violent.

At her height, as film historian Jeffrey Crouse notes, "She got her own dressing room and a star on the door. An entire clothing line was named after her ('Lassie Lou Classics'), and her name and image were used to endorse such famous brands as Buster Brown shoes, Jean Carol frocks and Sunkist oranges."

In 1932, she teamed up with her sister Peggy and started putting on performances that included dancing, singing, acrobatics, and playing instruments. The duo, billed as "The Ahern Sisters," mostly appeared in nightclubs and hotels in venues around the world. "While Peggy retired permanently from performing, Lassie returned to Hollywood in 1941 with her husband Johnny Brent, a former Dixieland drummer whom she had married in 1938, and who was employed as a musician for studio orchestras. She danced in City of Missing Girls (1941) and in the early musicals Donald O'Connor made at Universal (Top Man and Mister Big in 1943 and Patrick the Great in 1945), and had a bit part in George Cukor's Gaslight (1944). Her half-brother Fred also went in the film industry, notably as a production designer for Alfred Hitchcock." Lassie later went on to work as a dance teacher at the Ashram Health Spa near San Diego, where many known stars were students, including Renée Zellweger. During the 1970s, she made several guest appearances on television shows such as The Odd Couple.

== Later life and death ==
Ahern died in Prescott, Arizona, on February 15, 2018, of complications from influenza at the age of 97. At the time of her death, she was one of three surviving silent-era Our Gang members. Diana Serra Cary, the last silent film star, would pass away two years later on February 24, 2020.

== Filmography ==
Year	Title	Role	Reference
1923	Call of the Wild	Baby Girl	
1923	Derby Day	Girl Applauding Band	
1924	Robes of Sin	Baby	
1924	That Oriental Game		
1924	Cradle Robbers	Little Girl in Attic	
1924	Jubilo, Jr.	Tiny Man Circus Performer	
1924	Sweet Daddy	Daughter	
1924	The Fortieth Door		
1924	The Sun Down Limited	Passenger on train	
1924	Going to Congress	Little Girl	
1924	Fast Company	Little girl	
1925	Excuse Me		
1925	The Family Entrance	Daughter	
1925	Webs of Steel	McGregor's motherless child	
1925	The Lost Express	Alice Standish	
1925	Hell's Highroad		
1925	The Dark Angel	Flower Girl	
1925	Thank You		
1925	His Wooden Wedding	Fantasy Daughter	extant
1926	Thundering Fleas	Flower Girl at the Adult Wedding	
1927	Surrender	Little Jewish Girl	
1927	The Forbidden Woman	Little Arabian Girl	
1927	Uncle Tom's Cabin	Little Harry	
1927	Little Mickey Grogan	Susan Dale	
1937	Hollywood Party	Dancer with Sister Peggy	
1941	City of Missing Girls	Nightclub Performer	
1943	Top Man	Dancer	
1943	Mister Big	Dancer	
1944	Gaslight	Young Girl	
1945	Patrick the Great	Dancer	
