= Betty Mack =

American actress (1901–80)

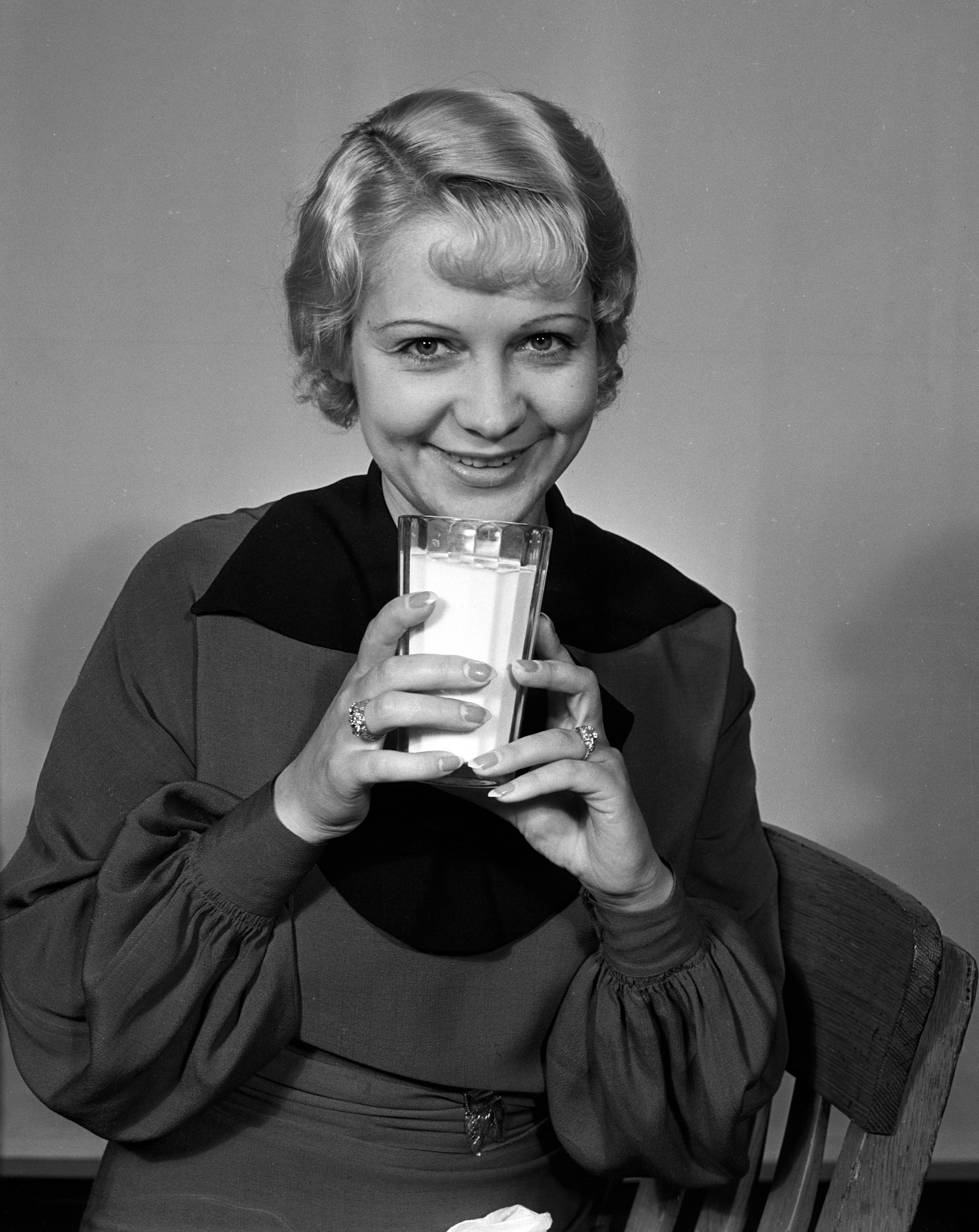
- Born: November 30, 1901; Illinois, U.S.
- Died: November 5, 1980 (aged 78); Placerville, California, U.S.
- Occupation: Actress
- Years active: 1919–1941

Betty Mack (November 30, 1901 – November 5, 1980) was an American stage and film actress who appeared in over 45 films between 1931 and 1941. She became Betty Yohalem after her marriage to George Yohalem in 1941. She wrote I remember…. Stories and Pictures of El Dorado County Pioneer Families.

== Biography ==
Born in Illinois in 1901, Mack began her career on the Broadway stage in 1919 in several musical comedies. Shifting to films in 1931, Mack starred in such films as Toll of the Desert (1935).

Mack also starred as Corabell, wife of Moe Howard, in the Three Stooges short film The Sitter Downers (1937).

In 1935 she was accused of drunk driving.

== Partial filmography ==
- Partners of the Trail (1931)
- Law of the Rio Grande (1931)
- Headin' for Trouble (1931)
- Beauty Parlor (1932)
- The Forty-Niners (1932)
- The Scarlet Brand (1932)
- Women Won't Tell (1932)
- Another Wild Idea (1934)
- Toll of the Desert (1935)
- Outlaw Rule (1935)
- The Reckless Buckaroo (1935)
- The Last of the Clintons (1935)
- Hair-Trigger Casey (1936)
- Senor Jim (1936)
- Easy Money (1936)
- The Sitter Downers (1937)
- Rough Riding Rhythm (1937)
- Mr. Boggs Steps Out (1938)
- The Pal from Texas (1939)
