= Another Wild Idea =

- Directed by: Charley Chase; Eddie Dunn
- Produced by: Hal Roach
- Starring: Charley Chase; Betty Mack
- Cinematography: Francis Corby
- Edited by: William H. Terhune
- Music by: Leroy Shield
- Distributed by: (MGM)
- Release date: June 16, 1934
- Running time: 17 minutes
- Country: United States
- Language: English

Another Wild Idea is a 1934 American Pre-Code short comedy science fiction film directed by and starring Charley Chase. It focuses on a Ray Gun which releases all of a person's inhibitions.

== Cast ==
- Charley Chase as Charley
- Betty Mack as Betty
- Frank Austin as Betty's Father
- Harry Dunkinson as Judge
- James C. Morton as Milkman
- Harry Bernard as Cop
- Baldwin Cooke as Radio Man
- Harry Bowen as Vegetable Man
- Tiny Sandford as Big Cop
- Pat Harmon as Cop
- Billy Gilbert as Off-Screen Voice (uncredited)
- Carlton Griffin as Undetermined Role (uncredited)

== See also ==
- List of American films of 1934
