= Excuse Me (1925 film) =

1925 film

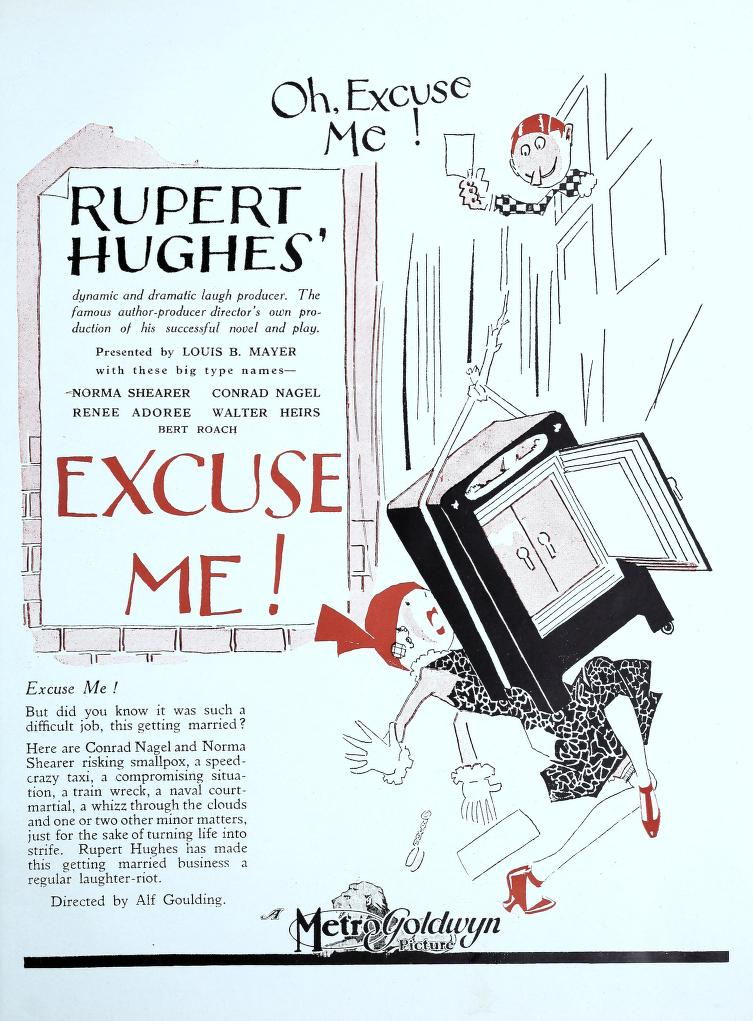
- Advertisement drawn by John Held Jr.
- Directed by: Alfred J. Goulding
- Screenplay by: Rupert Hughes
- Based on: Excuse Me by Rupert Hughes
- Produced by: Louis B. Mayer
- Starring: Conrad Nagel; Norma Shearer; Renée Adorée
- Cinematography: John W. Boyle
- Distributed by: Metro-Goldwyn-Mayer
- Release date: January 19, 1925
- Running time: 60 minutes
- Country: United States
- Language: Silent (English intertitles)

Excuse Me is a 1925 American silent comedy film starring Norma Shearer and Conrad Nagel. It was directed by Alfred J. Goulding, and based on the 1911 play of the same name written by best-selling novelist Rupert Hughes. The comedy concerns naval officer Harry Mallory and his would-be bride Marjorie Newton who spend most of their time running up and down a train looking for a clergyman to marry them.

Excuse Me is a remake of a 1915 film with the same name.

== Plot ==
As described in a review in a film magazine, promoted for bravery and ordered to catch a boat to the Philippines, Lt. Harry Mallory's sweetheart Marjorie Newton decides that she will go with him. There is a mad scramble to get a minister, but to no avail. Just as Marjorie is bidding Harry goodbye at the train station, he spies a minister getting aboard so he yanks her on the train. They fail to find the minister anywhere on the train, and with night coming, Harry and Marjorie have a terrible row about his taking her and the sleeping arrangements, so Harry sleeps in the wash room. In the morning, Marjorie in disgust plans to leave the train when Francine, an old sweetheart of Harry, boards the train with her little boy. Marjorie comes back onboard and is horrified when the boy calls Henry "papa." Francine had taught the boy to do this to fool detectives that are seeking to take the boy away. This situation is all fixed, and then the train pulls into a station where there is a convention of ministers. Harry is trying to corral one when the train leaves, so he hires an airplane to catch the train at the next station. From the air, he sees that a trestle of a bridge ahead of the train is on fire, and makes a daring transfer from the airplane to the train to warn about the bridge. The engineer stops the train, but some of the cars overturn, and the engine with Harry in it hangs over the edge. Harry is rescued, all journey to San Francisco where Harry and Marjorie marry, and they catch a ship for the Philippines.

== Cast ==
- Norma Shearer as Marjorie Newton
- Conrad Nagel as Harry Mallory
- Renée Adorée as Francine
- Walter Hiers as Porter
- John Boles as Lt. Shaw
- Bert Roach as Jimmy Wellington
- William V. Mong as Rev. Dr. Temple
- Edith Yorke as Mrs. Temple
- Gene Cameron as Lt. Hudson
- Fred Kelsey as George Ketchem
- Paul Weigel as Rev. Job Wales
- Mai Wells as Mrs. Job Wales
- Lassie Lou Ahern in a bit part (uncredited)
- Peggy Ahern in a bit part (uncredited)
- Jack Edwards in a bit part (uncredited)
- Evelyn Peirce in a bit part (uncredited)
- Dick Sutherland in a bit part (uncredited)

== Preservation ==
With no prints of Excuse Me located in any film archives, it is a lost film.
