= Lafayette Russell =

American football player and actor (1905–1978)

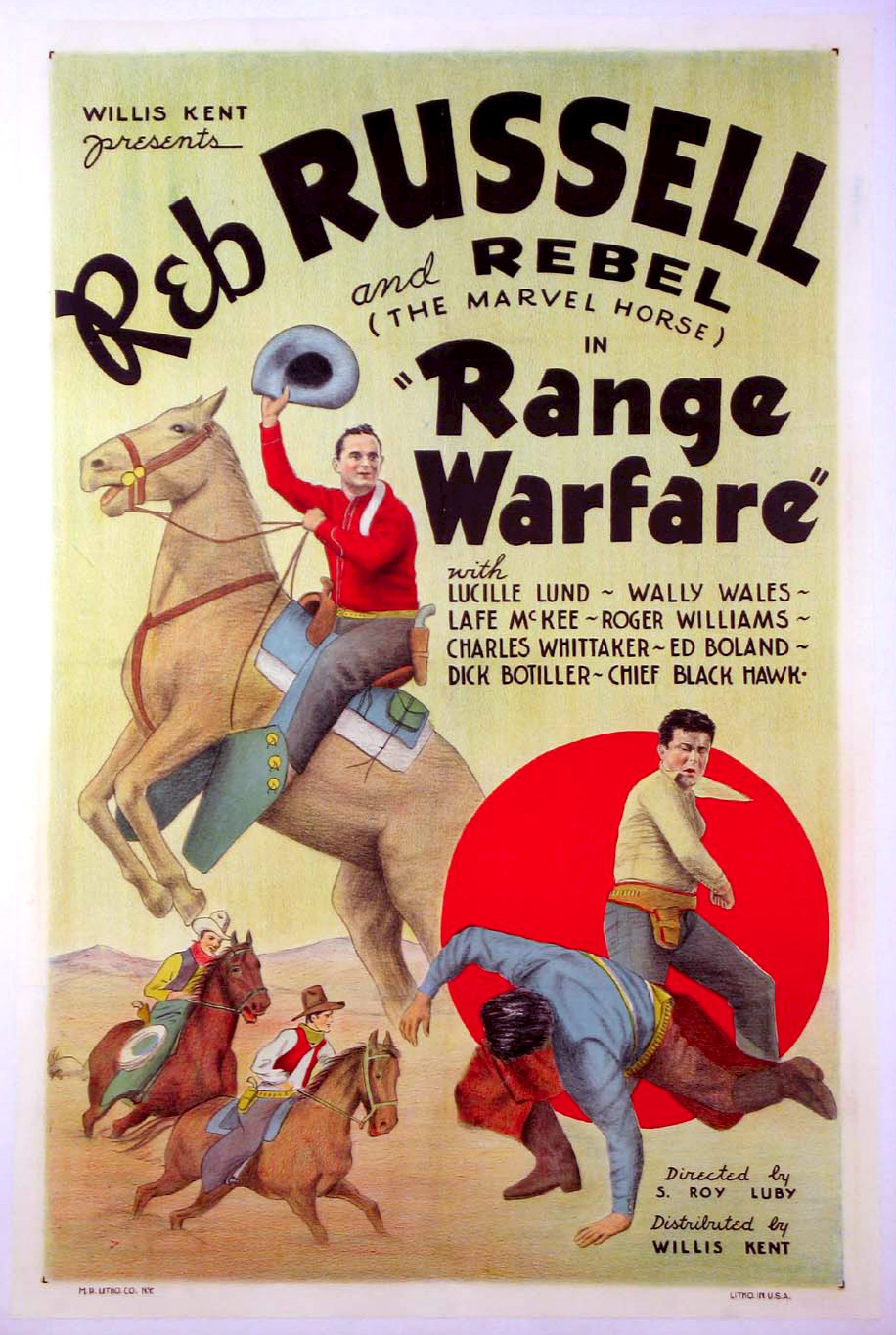
- Poster for Range Warfare (1934) with Russell

No. 0, 15
- Position: Back

Personal information
- Born: May 31, 1905; Osawatomie, Kansas, U.S.
- Died: March 16, 1978 (aged 72); Coffeyville, Kansas, U.S.
- Listed height: 6 ft 1 in (1.85 m)
- Listed weight: 205 lb (93 kg)

Career information
- High school: Missouri Military (Mexico, Missouri)
- College: Nebraska; Northwestern

Career history
- New York Giants (1933); Philadelphia Eagles (1933)

Awards and highlights
- First-team All-American (1930); First-team All-Big Ten (1930)

Career statistics
- Passing attempts: 8
- Passing completions: 2
- Completion percentage: 25%
- TD–INT: 0–2
- Passing yards: 32
- Passer rating: 4.2
- Rushing yards: 164
- Rushing average: 3.4
- Stats at Pro Football Reference

Lafayette H. "Reb" Russell (born May 31, 1905 – March 16, 1978) was an American football back and later an actor. He played in the National Football League (NFL) for the New York Giants and the Philadelphia Eagles, appearing in 10 games in 1933. He played college football at Nebraska before transferring to Northwestern.

As a small-time actor following his playing days, he appeared in a series of low-budget Westerns.

== Filmography ==
Year	Title	Role	Notes
1932	The All American	Football Player	Uncredited
1932	The Lost Special	Football Player	Serial, Uncredited
1934	Fighting to Live	Sheriff Reb Collins	
1934	Fighting Through	Reb Russell	
1934	The Man from Hell	Clint Mason	
1934	Range Warfare	Reb Russell, aka The Whistler	
1935	Lightning Triggers	Bob Grady	
1935	Arizona Bad Man	Steve Donovan	
1935	Outlaw Rule	Reb Russell	
1935	Border Vengeance	Peeler Benson, aka The Muley Kid	
1935	Blazing Guns	Reb Russell	
1935	The Cheyenne Tornado	Red - Cheyenne Kid	(final film role)
