= False Alarms (film) =

1936 American short film by Del Lord

- Directed by: Del Lord
- Written by: John Grey
- Produced by: Jules White
- Starring: Moe Howard; Larry Fine; Curly Howard; Stanley Blystone; June Gittelson; Beatrice Curtis; Beatrice Blinn; John Grey
- Cinematography: Benjamin H. Kline
- Edited by: Charles Hochberg
- Distributed by: Columbia Pictures
- Release date: August 16, 1936 (U.S.)
- Running time: 16:48
- Country: United States
- Language: English

False Alarms is a 1936 short subject directed by Del Lord starring American slapstick comedy team The Three Stooges (Moe Howard, Larry Fine and Curly Howard). It is the 17th entry in the series released by Columbia Pictures starring the comedians, who released 190 shorts for the studio between 1934 and 1959.

== Plot ==
The Stooges are firefighters whose penchant for off-duty pursuits with women causes them to oversleep and miss alarms. Vexed by their repeated negligence, their superior, Captain Ashe, threatens them with dismissal if they fail in their duties one more time, and orders them to clean the fire hoses. The trio's ineptitude in this task quickly leads to mishaps—first, the captain is doused with a bucket of water, then Curly carelessly allows the hoses to be run over and severed three times by streetcars.

Curly surreptitiously leaves work for a rendezvous with his girlfriend, Maisie, who has two friends who also desire dates. When Curly telephones Moe and Larry to invite them to the outing, Moe—under the watchful eye of the captain—tells him they cannot leave while on duty. Curly resorts to triggering a false fire alarm to summon his friends, causing chaos within the fire station.

Upon discovering Curly's ploy, Moe and Larry join the group, and a reckless escapade ensues as they race through town in Captain Ashe's newly acquired coupé. Their reckless driving culminates in a collision that traps them and their companions in the vehicle. After they escape, the damaged coupé becomes a source of further trouble as it races away, driverless. The car finally drives onto a ramp and into the back of a Bekins truck, which the Stooges then drive away in, pursued by Captain Ashe and the fire crew.

== Production notes ==
False Alarms was filmed on location in Los Angeles, California on May 19–22, 1936. The following landmarks appear in the film:

- Fire station: Engine No. 61 and Truck No. 61 (at 5821 West 3rd Street)
- Carl X Folsom Modern Motor Service (at 600 North Larchmont Boulevard). Replaced by the current building in 1966).
- Max Factor Make-up Studio
- Remington Rand, Inc.
- Safeway Stores
- Ashley Apartments
- Bekins movers
- Ozarks Drugstore
- Los Angeles Railway trolley No. 400
- Silvertown Tires
