= Official Officers =

1925 film

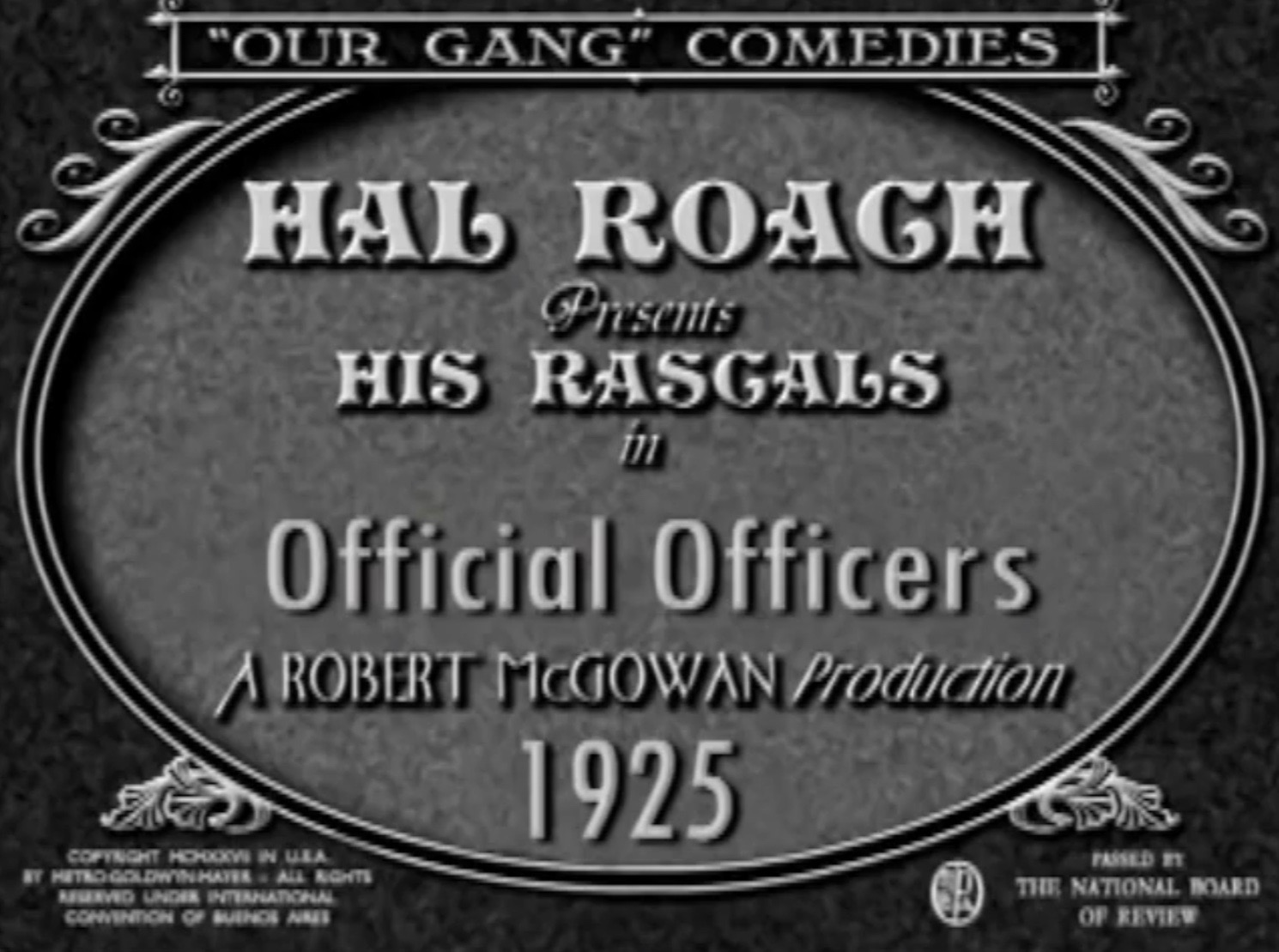
- Intertitle
- Directed by: Robert F. McGowan
- Written by: Hal Roach; H. M. Walker
- Produced by: Hal Roach
- Starring: Joe Cobb; Jackie Condon; Mickey Daniels; Johnny Downs; Allen Hoskins; Mary Kornman; Elmo Billings; Jackie Hanes; Jannie Hoskins; Peggy Ahern; Gabe Saienz; Pal the Dog
- Distributed by: Pathé Exchange
- Release date: June 30, 1925
- Running time: 20 minutes
- Country: United States
- Language: Silent with English intertitles

Official Officers is a 1925 American short silent comedy film, the 40th in the Our Gang series, directed by Robert F. McGowan.

== Cast ==
=== The Gang ===
- Joe Cobb as Joe
- Jackie Condon as Jackie
- Mickey Daniels as Mickey
- Johnny Downs as Johnny
- Allen Hoskins as Farina
- Mary Kornman as Mary
- Pal the Dog as himself

=== Additional cast ===
- Elmo Billings as Rival gang member
- Jackie Hanes as Crying toddler
- Jannie Hoskins as Kid arrested by Farina
- Peggy Ahern as Girl arrested by Mary
- Gabe Saienz as Rival gang member
- James Finlayson as Angry motorist
- Jack Gavin as 'Hard-Boiled' McManus
- Dick Gilbert as Officer
- Chet Brandenburg as Construction worker
- George Rowe as Cross-eyed motorist
- Charley Young as Tony, the fruit vendor
