= Range Warfare =

1934 film

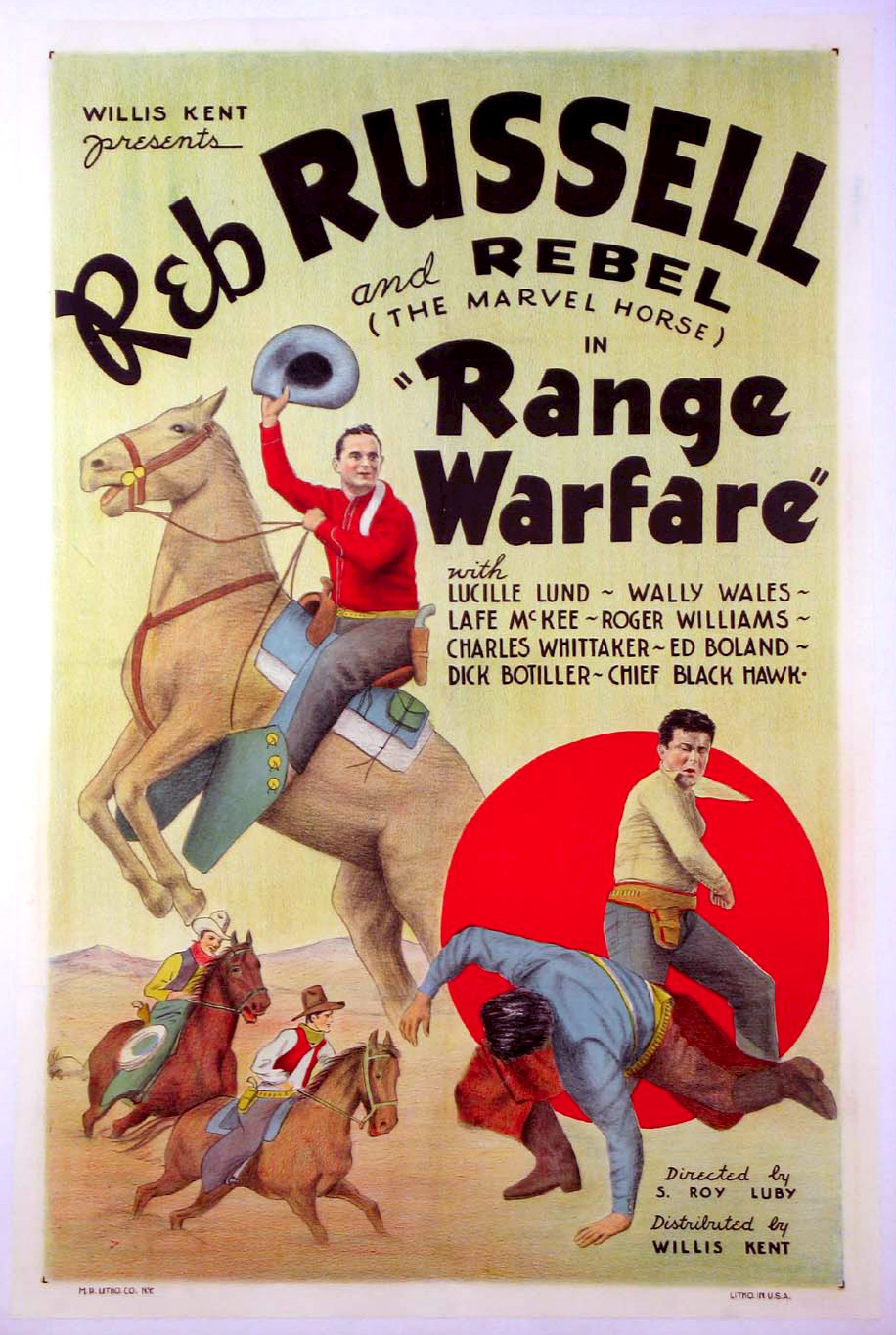
- Film poster
- Directed by: S. Roy Luby
- Written by: E.B. Mann (screenplay and story)
- Produced by: Willis Kent
- Starring: See below
- Cinematography: James Diamond
- Edited by: S. Roy Luby
- Release date: December 1, 1934
- Running time: 57 minutes (USA)
- Country: United States
- Language: English

Range Warfare is a 1934 American Western film directed by S. Roy Luby.

== Cast ==
- Lafayette Russell as Reb Russell, aka The Whistler
- Rebel as Rebel, Reb's Horse
- Lucille Lund as Sue Callahan
- Hal Taliaferro as Tommy Lord
- Roger Williams as Jess Monroe
- Slim Whitaker as Sheriff Curt Turner
- Lafe McKee as Wade Callahan
- Eddie Boland as Jack Brady
- Dick Botiller as Little Feather
- Ed Porter as Martin 'Deke' DeKalb
- Gene Alsace as Jerry Blake
- Chief Blackhawk as "'Injun" Joe
