= Let's Go, Gallagher =

1925 film

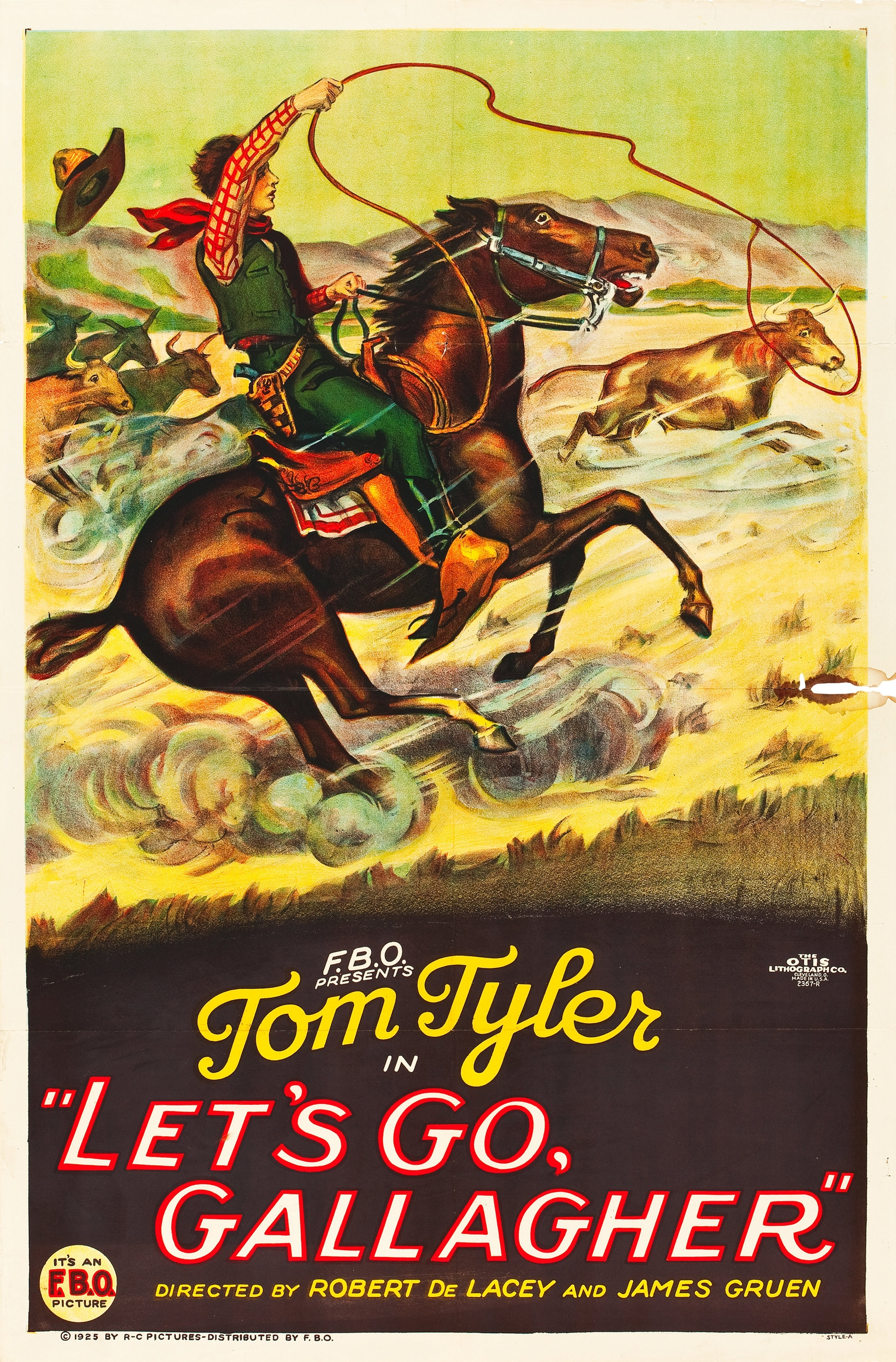
- Theatrical release poster
- Directed by: Robert De Lacey
- Written by: James Gruen; Percy Heath
- Starring: Tom Tyler; Barbara Starr; Olin Francis
- Cinematography: John W. Leezer
- Production company: Robertson-Cole Pictures Corporation
- Distributed by: Film Booking Offices of America; Ideal Films (UK)
- Release date: August 30, 1925
- Running time: 50 minutes
- Country: United States
- Language: Silent (English intertitles)

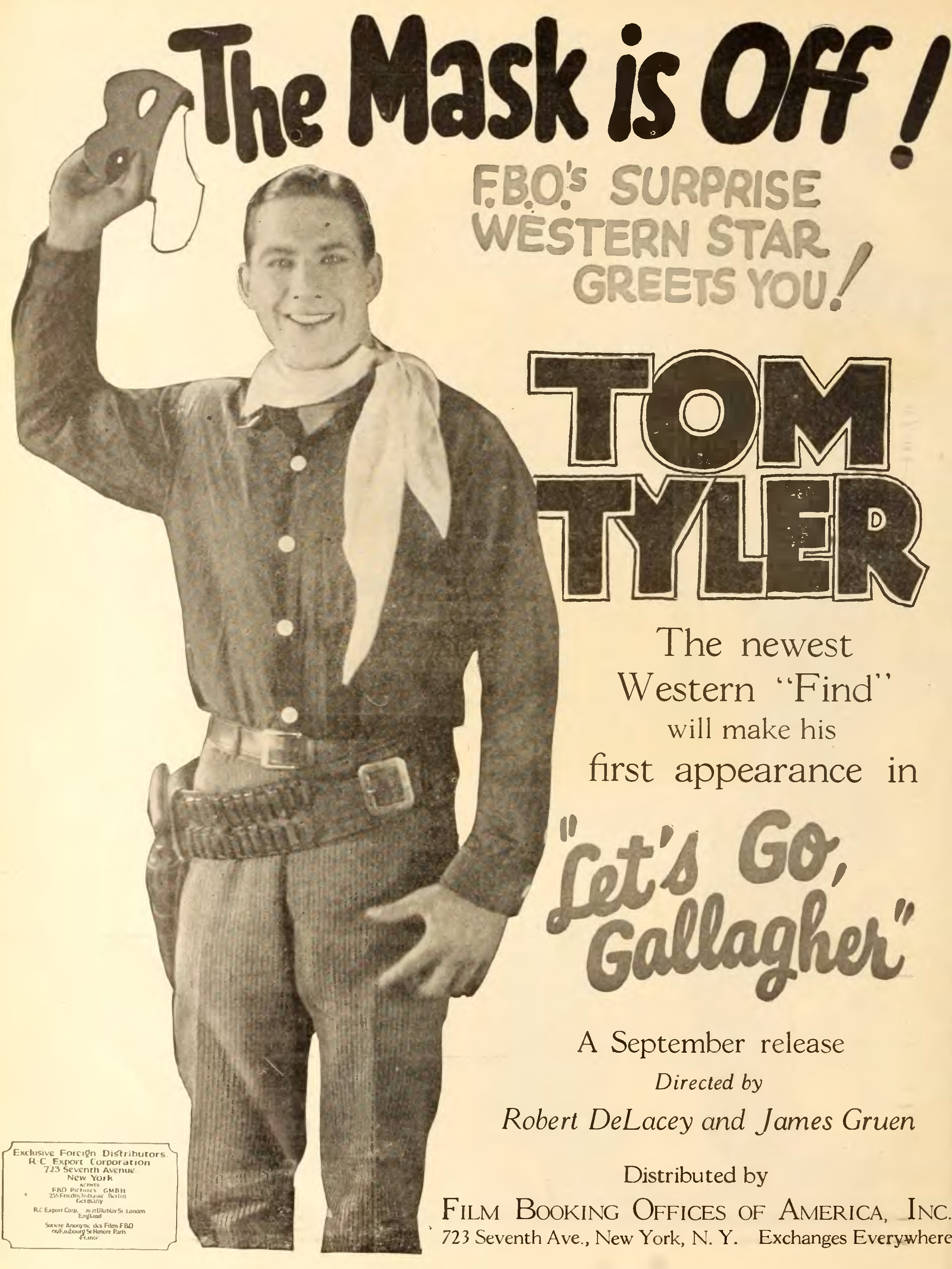
Let's Go, Gallagher ad in Motion Picture News, 1925

Let's Go, Gallagher is a 1925 American silent Western film directed by Robert De Lacey and starring Tom Tyler, Barbara Starr, and Olin Francis.

== Plot ==
As described in a film magazine review, Tom Gallagher, cowboy, wanders into a saloon and gets into a fight, as a result of which he is chased by a sheriff's posse. He pauses in his flight long enough to rescue Little Joey, a small boy, and a dog from under the wheels of a train and the posse catches him. However, he is released and goes to work on the Bar M ranch owned by Dorothy Manning. Dorothy's ranch hands are mismanaging things and her foreman, Black Carter, and another man are rustling her cattle. She makes Tom her foreman. The others resent this, especially Black Carter, who is in love with Dorothy and has told her that things will go better if she responds to his advances. Black Carter and Thug ambush Tom and Dorothy and Tom saves the young woman from death. Tom goes away to try to get money to clear the mortgage that Perkins holds on the ranch, and while he is gone Black Carter and Thug kidnap Dorothy. Then Tom is captured and tied up. He escapes, however, and reaches the ranch with the money ahead of Black Carter. Then oil is found on the ranch and all ends well.

== Cast ==
- Tom Tyler as Tom Gallagher
- Barbara Starr as Dorothy Manning
- Olin Francis as Black Carter
- Sam Peterson as Thug Peters
- Alfred Hewston as Bendy Mulligan
- Frankie Darro as Little Joey
