= Peggy Ahern =

American child actress (1917–2012)

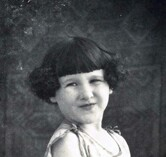
- Ahern c. 1921–1922
- Born: Peggy Lenore Ahearn Blaylock; March 9, 1917; Douglas, Arizona, U.S.
- Died: October 24, 2012 (aged 95)
- Occupation: Actress
- Years active: 1923–1939
- Relatives: Lassie Lou Ahern (sister)

Peggy Lenore Ahearn Blaylock (March 9, 1917 – October 24, 2012), known professionally as Peggy Ahern, was an American actress best known for her appearance in eight of the Our Gang series of films released between 1924 and 1927. The Our Gang series, which was also known as The Little Rascals or Hal Roach's Rascals, was a series of comedic, short silent films created by director and producer Hal Roach. Ahern was one of the last surviving cast members from a Hal Roach film.

== Early life ==
Ahern was born in Douglas, Arizona. She moved to Culver City, California, with her family in 1921.

== Career ==
She began her film career as a child actor in the 1923 Hal Roach film, The Call of the Wild, which was released by Universal Studios. She next appeared in small roles in two films, both released in 1925: Excuse Me, starring Norma Shearer, and Not So Long Ago, starring Ricardo Cortez and Betty Bronson.

Ahern was then cast by Roach in eight of his Little Rascal films from 1924 to 1927: Cradle Robbers in 1924, The Sun Down Limited in 1924, Circus Fever in 1925, Dog Days in 1925, The Love Bug in 1925, Official Officers in 1925, War Feathers in 1926, and Olympic Games in 1927.

== Personal life ==
Ahern and her sister, Lassie Lou Ahern, toured as a vaudeville song-and-dance act from 1932 until 1939. They also appeared in the 1937 comedic short musical, Hollywood Party by Charley Chase.

== Death ==
Ahern died on October 24, 2012, at the age of 95.
