= The Forbidden Woman (1927 film) =

1927 film by Paul L. Stein

- Lobby card
- Directed by: Paul L. Stein
- Written by: Clara Beranger; Elmer Harris
- Starring: Jetta Goudal; Ivan Lebedeff; Leonid Snegoff
- Cinematography: David Abel
- Production company: DeMille Pictures Corporation
- Distributed by: Pathé Exchange
- Release date: October 29, 1927
- Running time: 70 minutes
- Country: United States
- Languages: Silent; English intertitles

The Forbidden Woman is a 1927 American silent drama film directed by Paul L. Stein and starring Jetta Goudal, Ivan Lebedeff and Leonid Snegoff. The film is set in French North Africa.

== Cast ==
- Jetta Goudal as Zita Gautier
- Ivan Lebedeff as Sheik
- Leonid Snegoff as Sultan
- Josephine Norman as Zita's Maid
- Victor Varconi as Col. Gautier
- Joseph Schildkraut as Jean La Coste
- Lassie Lou Ahern as Little Arabian Girl
- Catherine Dale Owen

== Preservation ==
Complete prints of The Forbidden Woman are held by the Library of Congress. Cinematheque Royale de Belgique, Lobster Films in Paris, the Academy Film Archive and the Archives du Film du CNC in Bois d'Arcy. Additionally, the Library of congress holds a digital copy of the film converted from a 16mm print. The UCLA Film & Television Archive holds an 800-foot fragment.

== Bibliography ==
- Langman, Larry. Destination Hollywood: The Influence of Europeans on American Filmmaking. McFarland, 2000.
