= Rough Riding Rhythm =

1938 film directed by J. P. McGowan

- Theatrical release poster
- Directed by: J. P. McGowan
- Screenplay by: Arthur Everett
- Based on: Getting a Start in Life by James Oliver Curwood
- Produced by: Maurice Conn
- Starring: Kermit Maynard; Beryl Wallace; Ralph Peters; Olin Francis; Betty Mack; Curley Dresden; Cliff Parkinson
- Cinematography: Jack Greenhalgh
- Edited by: Leete Renick Brown
- Production company: Conn Pictures Corporation
- Distributed by: Ambassador Pictures
- Release date: June 15, 1938
- Running time: 57 minutes
- Country: United States
- Language: English

Rough Riding Rhythm is a 1938 American Western film directed by J. P. McGowan and written by Arthur Everett. The film stars Kermit Maynard, Beryl Wallace, Ralph Peters, Olin Francis, Betty Mack, Curley Dresden and Cliff Parkinson. The film was released on August 15, 1937, by Ambassador Pictures.

== Plot ==
Jim and Scrubby visit Scrubby's sister and find her dead. They suspect that murderer is her husband Jake, but they are arrested instead.

== Cast ==
- Kermit Maynard as Jim Langley
- Beryl Wallace as Helen Hobart
- Ralph Peters as Scrubby
- Olin Francis as Jake Horne
- Betty Mack as Ethyl Horne
- Curley Dresden as Soapy Phillips
- Cliff Parkinson as Hank
- Dave O'Brien as Detective Waters
- Newt Kirby as Detective Thomas
