= The Sitter Downers =

1937 American short film by Del Lord

- Directed by: Del Lord
- Written by: Ewart Adamson
- Produced by: Jules White
- Starring: Moe Howard; Larry Fine; Curly Howard; Marcia Healy; June Gittelson; Betty Mack; James C. Morton
- Cinematography: George Meehan
- Edited by: Charles Nelson
- Distributed by: Columbia Pictures
- Release date: November 26, 1937 (U.S.)
- Running time: 15:34
- Country: United States
- Language: English

The Sitter Downers is a 1937 short subject directed by Del Lord starring American slapstick comedy team The Three Stooges (Moe Howard, Larry Fine and Curly Howard). It is the 27th entry in the series released by Columbia Pictures starring the comedians, who released 190 shorts for the studio between 1934 and 1959.

== Plot ==
The Stooges propose marriage to three sisters but must first win consent from their prospective father-in-law. His hostile rejection of their suit prompts the Stooges to initiate a sitdown strike in their fiancees' home. Their protest garners widespread attention, eliciting a deluge of fan mail, including promised donations of a free lot and a free "ready-cut" house. Despite the father-in-law's efforts to solicit governmental intervention in their eviction, he is eventually forced to acquiesce to the Stooges' matrimonial desires to end the strike.

Subsequently united in wedlock, the newly formed couples confront the daunting task of constructing their house from a kit. After a warning from the three brides that there will be no honeymoon until the house is built, the reluctant Stooges embark upon the laborious task. Setbacks and mishaps abound during the construction process, which proceeds haphazardly after Curly accidentally destroys the plans in a fire. The finished, misshapen structure includes randomly placed windows, a bathtub mounted sideways on a wall, and an enigmatic staircase to nowhere.

When the wives are invited to view their new home, they are initially impressed, but a seemingly innocuous gesture precipitates the catastrophic collapse of the structure onto the newlyweds.

== Production notes ==
The Stooges' wives are named Florabell (June Gittelson), Corabell (Betty Mack), and Dorabell (Marcia Healy, sister of the Stooges' former boss, Ted Healy). This was the last Stooge film released during Ted Healy's lifetime: he died on December 21, 1937. Filming commenced between May 27 and June 2, 1937.

A colorized version of this film was released as part of the 2004 DVD collection entitled "Goofs on the Loose".
