= June Gittelson =

American actress (1910–93)

- Gittelson from the film The Sitter Downers
- Born: May 6, 1910; Los Angeles, California, U.S.
- Died: November 28, 1993 (aged 83); Northridge, Los Angeles, California, U.S.
- Years active: 1928–1945

June Gittelson (May 6, 1910 – November 28, 1993) was an American film actress. She appeared in more than 70 films between 1928 and 1945.

== Career ==
Due to her rotund figure, Gittelson was often cast as a love interest who often intimidated her husband or boyfriend. Modern viewers will recognize Gittelson in her appearances in several early Three Stooges films such as Slippery Silks, Dizzy Doctors, Horses' Collars and The Sitter Downers. Perhaps her most famous role was as Minnie in the Stooge film False Alarms, in which she played the large and man-hungry lady pursuing the affections of a reluctant Curly Howard (Curly refers to her as "Hercules"). he telephones his pals: "Hello, Moe? You'd better come over. You're missing one of the biggest things in your life!" When she remarks, "I grow on people!", Curly responds, "So do warts!" Her line as she is getting into a car with the Stooges: "Let's go places and eat things!"

Gittelson also appeared in many non-Stooges films, usually in minor roles and seldom credited. Feature films in which she played character parts include King Kong (1933), Mark of the Vampire (1935), and Mr. Smith Goes to Washington (1939). Sometimes only her photograph was necessary to get laughs, as in the Laurel and Hardy feature Our Relations (1936).

In 1943 she adopted a new professional name, June Bryde, and continued to work in occasional features and Columbia shorts. She retired from the screen in 1946.

== Death ==
Gittelson died in Northridge, California on November 28, 1993, aged 83.

== Partial filmography ==
- The Girl from Everywhere (1927) - Minor Role (uncredited)
- Moby Dick (1930) - Fat Fanny on Dock (uncredited)
- The Jazz Cinderella (1930) - Sylvia de Sprout
- Midnight Daddies (1930) - Heavy Woman on Vibrating Machine (uncredited)
- Liliom (1930) - Buttercup (uncredited)
- A Soldier's Plaything (1930) - Tim's Girl at Coney Island (uncredited)
- Sunny (1930) - Mrs. Hammerslagger (uncredited)
- Viennese Nights (1930) - Fat Girl at Party (uncredited)
- The Hot Heiress (1931) - Fat Party Guest in Pool (uncredited)
- Side Show (1931) - Fat Girl Getting Weight Estimated (uncredited)
- Manhattan Parade (1931) - Miss Hemingway (uncredited)
- Two Seconds (1932) - Blind Date Fat Girl (uncredited)
- The Phantom President (1932) - Woman in Medicine Show (uncredited)
- Three on a Match (1932) - Fat Prisoner (uncredited)
- Hard to Handle (1933) - Fat Girl with Hamburger (uncredited)
- King Kong (1933) - Fat Woman (uncredited)
- Lilly Turner (1933) - Fat Lady in Doc McGill's audience (uncredited)
- Gold Diggers of 1933 (1933) - Fat Woman in 'Pettin' in the Park' Number (uncredited)
- Don't Bet on Love (1933) - Heavy Wedding Guest (uncredited)
- Rafter Romance (1933) - Bobbie Finklestein - Telemarketer (uncredited)
- Stage Mother (1933) - Laughing Fat Woman (uncredited)
- Footlight Parade (1933) - Myrtle (uncredited)
- Goodbye Love (1933) - Fat Lady in Sand (uncredited)
- Sing and Like It (1934) - Minnie - Fat Little Theater Dancer (uncredited)
- Woman Haters (1934, Short) - Mary's Sister (uncredited)
- Student Tour (1934) - Fat Girl (uncredited)
- Lost in the Stratosphere (1934) - Gretchen
- The White Parade (1934) - Lou 'Pudgy' Stebbins
- Horses' Collars (1935, Short) - Chubby Dance Hall Girl (uncredited)
- Storm Over the Andes (1935) - Big Woman (uncredited)
- Mark of the Vampire (1935) - Annie
- The Raven (1935) - Autograph Hound (scenes deleted)
- Oh, My Nerves (1935, Short)
- The Adventures of Frank Merriwell (1936, Serial) - Dance Party Guest (uncredited)
- Speed (1936) - Woman at Barn Dance (uncredited)
- Early to Bed (1936) - Mrs. Fosbinder (uncredited)
- Parole! (1936) - Customer (uncredited)
- High Tension (1936) - Fat Girl (uncredited)
- False Alarms (1936, Short) - Minnie (uncredited)
- Our Relations (1936) - Fat Girl on Photo (uncredited)
- Three Married Men (1936) - Miss Dobson (uncredited)
- Under Your Spell (1936) - Secretary (uncredited)
- Career Woman (1936) - Carroll's Friend with Glasses (uncredited)
- Slippery Silks (1936, Short) - Fat Fashion Show Guest (uncredited)
- Dizzy Doctors (1937, Short) - Moe's Wife (uncredited)
- The Hit Parade (1937) - Fat Girl Singer (uncredited)
- The Road Back (1937) - Fat Woman (uncredited)
- Meet the Boyfriend (1937) - Fat Girl (uncredited)
- It's All Yours (1937) - Ms. Atworthy (uncredited)
- The Sitter Downers (1937, Short) - Flora Bell (uncredited)
- Wild Horse Rodeo (1937) - Lullaby's Dancing Partner (uncredited)
- Swing Your Lady (1938) - Fat Waitress (uncredited)
- Rebellious Daughters (1938) - Fluffy (uncredited)
- Sing You Sinners (1938) - Fat Girl (uncredited)
- The Colorado Trail (1938) - Fat Girl at Dance (uncredited)
- There's That Woman Again (1938) - Fat Woman (uncredited)
- Code of the Secret Service (1939) - Fat Girl on Train (uncredited)
- The Women (1939) - Mrs. Goldstein (uncredited)
- Dancing Co-Ed (1939) - Fat Girl (uncredited)
- Mr. Smith Goes to Washington (1939) - Woman at Station (uncredited)
- Convicted Woman (1940) - Tubby
- Florian (1940) - Fat Girl (uncredited)
- New Moon (1940) - Madeline (uncredited)
- Caught in the Draft (1941) - Fat Hitchhiker (uncredited)
- Doctors Don't Tell (1941)
- Mug Town (1942) - Matilda - Fat Girl (uncredited)
- The Man from Oklahoma (1945) - Little Bird on the Wing
- Affairs of Geraldine (1946) - Large Woman (uncredited) (final film role)
