= Big Mouth season 6 =

Season of television series

Big Mouth
- Season 6
- Season 6 promotional poster
- Starring: Nick Kroll; John Mulaney; Jessi Klein; Jason Mantzoukas; Ayo Edebiri; Fred Armisen; Maya Rudolph; Jordan Peele
- No. of episodes: 10

Release
- Original network: Netflix
- Original release: October 28, 2022

Season chronology
- ← Previous; Season 5 Next → Season 7

The sixth season of Big Mouth, an American adult animated coming-of-age sitcom created by Andrew Goldberg, Nick Kroll, Mark Levin, and Jennifer Flackett, was released on Netflix on October 28, 2022. The series centers on teens based on Kroll and Goldberg's upbringing in suburban New York, with Kroll voicing his fictional younger self. Big Mouth explores puberty while "embrac[ing] a frankness about the human body and sex."

== Cast and characters ==
=== Main ===
- Nick Kroll as Nick Birch, Maurice the Hormone Monster, Coach Steve Steve, Lola Skumpy and Marty's Lovebug
- John Mulaney as Andrew Glouberman
- Jessi Klein as Jessi Glaser
- Jason Mantzoukas as Jay Bilzerian and Guy Bilzerian
- Ayo Edebiri as Missy Foreman-Greenwald
- Fred Armisen as Elliot Birch
- Maya Rudolph as Connie the Hormone Monstress, Diane Birch
- Jordan Peele as Duke Ellington and Cyrus Foreman-Greenwald

=== Recurring ===
- Andrew Rannells as Matthew MacDell
- Ali Wong as Ali
- Brian Tyree Henry as Elijah
- Thandiwe Newton as Mona
- Joe Wengert as Caleb, Lump Humpman and Joe
- Gil Ozeri as Gil
- June Diane Raphael as Devin LeSeven
- Jak Knight as DeVon
- Richard Kind as Marty Glouberman
- Paula Pell as Barbara Glouberman
- Seth Morris as Greg Glaser
- Jenny Slate as Caitlin Grafton
- Chloe Fineman as Leah Birch and Delilah
- Jon Daly as Judd Birch and Rodney
- Nathan Fillion as Himself
- Chris O’Dowd as Flanny O’Lympic
- Kristen Schaal as Bernadette "Bernie" Sanders
- Fran Gillespie as Samira
- Peter Capaldi as Seamus MacGregor
- Cole Escola as Montel

=== Guest ===
- Heather Lawless as Jenna Bilzerian
- Maria Bamford as Nancy
- Brandon Kyle Goodman as God's Boyfriend and Elijah's Uncles
- Annaleigh Ashford as The Rice Purity Test
- Amber Ruffin as Auntie Amber
- Mark Duplass and Paul Scheer as Val and Kurt Bilzerian
- Gina Rodriguez as Gina Alvarez
- Ira Glass as Himself
- Rosa Salazar as Miss Benitez
- Natasha Lyonne as Suzette
- Jeff Goldblum as The Apple Brooch
- Gary Cole as Edward MacDell
- Julie White as Kimberly MacDell
- Kristen Wiig as Jessi's Vagina and Beatrice
- Steve-O as Himself (in live-action)
- Tyler the Creator as Jesus
- Juliet Mills as Rita St. Swithens
- Ed Helms, Adam Levine, Matt Rogers are the members of the boy band, Bros 4 Life.

== Episodes ==
| No. overall | No. in season | Title | Directed by | Written by | Original release date |
|---|---|---|---|---|---|
| 52 | 1 | "The Hookup House" | Bryan L Francis | Gil Ozeri | October 28, 2022 |
Following the events of the first season of Human Resources, Maury is pregnant with Connie's child. After two weeks of being snowed in, the kids are frustrated from being stuck with their families, alone without friends and horny. After returning to school in the new year, Matthew and Jay attempt to find a private place to hook up, which only results in Jay's parents' car flying off a cliff and exploding. Jessi is conflicted about her feelings for Judd, as he is too old for her, while Missy becomes attracted to a new student named Elijah. Andrew's attempts to Zoom and fondle his breasts with Bernie results in his parents finding out and his angry father taking his door away. Jay takes Matthew to Nick's attic for a private place, as their families would not allow them in their own homes. Andrew is interested in using the attic as well to Zoom, but Nick does not want anyone hooking up at his house if he is not, but soon becomes convinced that having the hookup house could make him popular with other students. Nick, Andrew and Jay advertise the attic at school. Missy talks to Elijah, and eventually invites him to the "hookup house", while Jessi is convinced to go in the hopes Judd will want to make out with her. That night in the attic, the party is not lively, due to Nick's parents offering people refreshments and no one wanting to hook up with each other. Nick's parents let it slip that there is a hookup party at their house to Andrew's parents, with Marty rushing over in an attempt to castrate his son during a Zoom with Bernie. Jessi looks for Judd, only to find him with a teenage girl in his room. In an attempt to make the party come to life, Lola kisses Nick, and soon everyone begins making out. Elijah never shows up to the party, and Missy finds out that he is in fact a devout Christian who was at church, which only makes him more enticing as he is "forbidden." After Andrew trips and falls down the attic stairs running from his father, Matthew and Jay head to Matthew's home, where he introduces Jay to his family. This upsets Matthew's devout mother. While home, Andrew has another call with Bernie, and she accepts being his girlfriend.
| 53 | 2 | "Twenty Two and You" | Alex Salyer | Joe Wengert | October 28, 2022 |
With Bernie now his girlfriend, Andrew has been assigned Flanny the Love Bug. Jay attempts to introduce Matthew to his family, but his brothers violently fight over a McDonald's meal Jay had brought, and his mother passes out from heavy drinking. Nick is horrified to see that he has the same habit as his father to hold out his pinky finger while holding something. At school, the students have taken genetic tests for biology class. Missy finds out she is 30 percent Nigerian while Elijah finds out he is 47 percent. Nick finds out he has Scottish ancestry. Jay finds out he has a half-brother due to his father's cheating, and sees it as a chance to reintroduce Matthew to his family, to Matthew's reluctance. Elijah asks Missy out to a Jamaican restaurant for research (as the town does not have a Nigerian restaurant) and Missy is confused as to whether it is a date or not. Nick brings up the Scottish ancestry results at dinner, which causes Elliot to storm off and Diane to say that talking about his family is off-limits. Jay finds out his half-brother is a 26-year-old magician who dismisses the familial connection; Jay then gets the idea to start looking for others of his father's children around town. Jay's mother reveals she has a book of all the dirt on Guy in case of her disappearance, which Jay starts using to follow his father's other children listed. Nick and Andrew snoop in Nick's parent's closet, where they discover a box of medals and a passport for "William Alastair MacGregor" with a photo of Elliot as a young man. The two search the name on the Internet and find an old video of Nick's dad as a young champion of the sport of "Scottish nipple twisting". At the restaurant, Missy and Elijah soon bond over discussing the history of West African cultures and art, to Mona's frustration, but soon she delights when Missy accepts Elijah's invitation to a Friday night party. Jay finds out that he has dozens of secret half-siblings and plans to introduce Matthew to every one of them by inviting all of them to a "bastard family reunion". At the party, Guy arrives due to an alert he received about a naked lady showering, and soon Jay's announcement is overshadowed by all of Guy's offspring begging him for attention, which causes Guy to escape through a hidden tunnel while the other brothers loot the house and leave. Matthew tells Jay that despite what they said, he is much better than them and somehow ended up a good person. As Coach Steve is a kind of father figure to him, Jay introduces Matthew as his lover. Nick and Andrew engage in twisting each other's nipples until Elliot finds them, and explains that his father was obsessed with nipple twisting, raising his son to be a twister until he only felt loved when brutalizing someone else's nipples, and was so desperate for said love that he pulled an opponent's nipples off during a match. After that, he left his father's home and became a surgeon, vowing to be the opposite kind of father he had. Flanny, disgusted by Andrew's depravity in one day, quits being his Love Bug, but stays on after hearing Maury talk lovingly about Andrew's behavior. Missy finds out that the party is in fact a Christian Youth Group meeting, but does hold Elijah's hand.
| 54 | 3 | "Vagina Shame" | Henrique Jardim | Emily Altman | October 28, 2022 |
Rita St. Swithens, a Shame Wizard like her son Lionel, hosts a very special episode focusing on vaginal shame.: Case Study #1: Jessica Cobain Glaser. Jessi is still living with her father and his pregnant girlfriend Caitlin. She has been wearing leggings for 11 days in a row and lying to Caitlin about their cleanliness out of spite, until her vaginal area starts itching. Trying to scratch it in school does not help, and neither does urinating. She tries to call her mother Shannon who is busy working, and at a drugstore meets several talking feminine hygiene products who try to convince her to choose them. She swipes several wipes that do nothing, while her vagina produces a discharge before turning into her psychotic twin, Beatrice.; Case Study #2: Lola Ugfuglio Skumpy. While her mother is out of town following and having sex with the band Hoobastank, Lola watches internet porn and notices that all of the women do not have pubic hairs. Despite the words of her pubic hair knights in a toy castle saying that it offers protection from dirt and bacteria, a few days later she overhears Nick, Jay and Andrew talking about how they dislike pubic hair on women after seeing Short Cuts. She later shaves them off, but soon realizes that the knights are gone much to her regret.; Interlude:What Do Boys Know About Vaginas?: Nick fails to draw a proper vagina, only drawing a triangle; Marty Glouberman angrily tells the interviewer "it's none of your business" and forces the camera out of his car; Coach Steve calls them "sweeties" and asks if the triangle Nick drew has a sister.; Case Study #3: Missy Foreman-Greenwald. Feeling left out in the locker room when all the other girls look for tampons, Missy fakes rummaging in her bag for one and then lies about using a DivaCup (a menstrual cup brand) to hide the fact that she hasn't yet menstruated. As soon as she enters a bathroom stall however, she realizes that her underwear is stained with menstrual blood, but she cannot turn to any of her friends for help as she had already lied. At home, she buries her bloodstained briefs in the bathroom waste basket and continues to feel awful in her bedroom. Meanwhile her mother, used to her daughter's adolescent mood swings, ignores her at first, but soon finds the underpants and explains that she told Missy she would be a "moon goddess" so that getting her period would be a rite of passage for her. She also explains that her late mother was a terrible mother who slapped her in a "Jewish tradition" after getting her period and, in a tender mother-daughter bonding moment, offers a secret stash of Advils that she takes for menstrual cramps.; Case Study #4: Caitlin Grafton. Caitlin is 26 and seven months pregnant, when she and Greg get terrible news: an ultrasound reveals that she has cephalopelvic disproportion (CPD), meaning that her vaginal canal is too small to give birth. The doctor recommends a C-Section, but Caitlin wants a natural birth and feels less like a woman while Greg only clumsily manages to offend her further with clueless remarks. As she heads to the bathroom, she catches Jessi furiously scrubbing her own vulva with a loofah to stop the itching. Caitlin realizes that Jessi has a yeast infection from wearing the unwashed leggings for too long. She offers Jessi Monistat, a topical vaginal cream, which relieves the infection and her vagina returns to normal. Caitlin begins crying about the C-section and having CPD, while Jessi admits she was a C-section baby, which makes Caitlin feel a little better about how her own child might turn out. Jessi's vagina points out that she is an organ like any other part of the body, and that it is actually societal expectations that are really the issue. Rita bemoans how camaraderie, compassion and empathy are the enemies of shame, but remarks she has a few tricks left. That night, Shannon calls, explaining that she had a new phone and didn't see the notifications, but is upset that she wasn't able to help Jessi while Caitlin was able, and the two produce a whole new cycle of blaming themselves as Rita promotes her book Women and Shame.
| 55 | 4 | "Rice Purity Test" | Bryan L Francis | Victor Quinaz | October 28, 2022 |
Maury's pregnancy is advancing to the point where he needs to constantly use the restroom, and he guilts Matthew into helping him and Rick throw a baby shower for him, but without inviting Connie, who has not wanted to be a parent. While everyone is sitting bored at a dodgeball game in PE class, Bernie sends Andrew the "Rice Purity test": an online quiz with 100 "naughty" things to check off what one has done, from kissing in public to smoking crack cocaine, with a lower score meaning higher depravity. The test goes viral amongst the students: Devin gets a 74, Jessi and Lola get 71; Andrew gloats about his score of 61. Elijah gets 98 while Missy gets an 82 and tries to seduce an oblivious Elijah. Jay gets a 3, to everyone's shock, while Nick is embarrassed by his score of 92. Rick lets slip that Connie is not invited to the baby shower and she storms off upset. Andrew shares his score with Bernie, who reveals she got a 54 and reveals in flashback some of her antics, to Andrew's discomfort and an argument erupts over the double standard applied by his choice of words. Maury dismisses it while Flanny points out to Andrew that he sounded like his father. Shannon picks up Jessi after school and reveals that she is moving back to Bridgeton and bought a condo. To Jessi's displeasure, the condo is right next door to Lola's. After school, Nick admits to Jay about his 92 score, and Jay offers to help him while also lowering his own score to zero: climbing to the top of a water tower to have sex to join the 'mile high club"; doing hard drugs; and masturbating each other to commit an act of incest, since Jay views Nick as a "brother." Missy further tries to entice Elijah in a classroom, but he remains terrified of her advances. Marty picks Andrew up from school, and makes him run into their temple to get Barbara, who is in the middle of a Haddasah meeting. Andrew is acting more and more like Marty, and when asked to sit and explain, his talk of how his girlfriend should only have done those things with him angers the women in the meeting, who point out that Bernie is not property. After a flashback montage of his mother's sexual history, Andrew apologizes. Marty bursts in to get Barbara to leave but she and the other women say no and kick him out. Elijah tries to explain how it will never work between him and Missy, as it's not his faith but him, and they both agree to take it slow. At the water tower, Jay gives Nick an anti-worm suppository for dogs, and ultimately Nick is unable to participate in the mutual act, feeling fine with being a 92. At Shannon's new condo, Jessi can see Lola's unhappy life from the other building, and feels guilty about how lucky she has been to have a mother who is there for her. Jessi invites Lola (her "whore sister" as Lola kept insisting due to their scores) over to help unpack, and Connie realizes maybe she should grow up, and leaves for Maury's baby shower. Andrew calls Bernie again, and apologizes for how he treated her, and the two make up. At Maury's baby shower, Maury laments how alone he will be in raising the baby, when Connie arrives. As everyone celebrates, Maury's water breaks, and he births the baby Hormone Monster out of his anus. He names the monster "Montel."
| 56 | 5 | "Andrew's Gonna Touch A Boob Tonight" | Alex Salyer | L.E. Correia | October 28, 2022 |
Bernie is in town for a night and suggests that after showing up for dinner, she and Andrew finish reaching second base that was interrupted before. Nick finds out his grandfather Seamus is living in Staten Island. Maury is exhausted breastfeeding Montel and Connie avoids them. For their one-month anniversary, Jay offers to make Matthew dinner, but his pillows want to have a four-way. When Jay presents the pillows after dinner, Matthew is weirded out as he only sees pillows without faces, and to keep him around, Jay stops imagining the pillows. Nick tricks his father into letting him go to New York City, and soon finds his grandfather, living in squalor. After trying to leave results in Seamus hurting his ankle, Nick calls his father to pick him up. Elliot, while angry at his father, still has compassion and tries to help his father. At Andrew's house, Barbara serves up dinner for Shabbat with their rabbi while Bernie arrives. The dinner goes poorly as Marty keeps insulting Barbara and the rabbi. After another argument where Barbara says she goes to the synagogue for purpose, Marty claim she is having an affair with the rabbi, and Barbara storms out and drives off. The ordeal leaves Bernie anxious, and Andrew is unable to go through with touching her breasts. Instead, he breaks down crying on Bernie's lap while Montel tells Maury he's a good father. Andrew blurts out to Bernie that he loves her, and she says she loves him as well.
| 57 | 6 | "The Apple Brooch" | Henrique Jardim | Kelsey Krasnigor | October 28, 2022 |
Seamus is living with the Birches, a cast on his ankle, and annoying the other family members with unclean habits such as urinating in beer cans. A new Apple-brand brooch becomes the new hot status symbol; after seeing an ad for it, Nick wants one but Diane refuses due to his previous behavior. Jessi is bonding with Caitlin to Shannon's anxiety. Shannon buys Jessi an Apple brooch, which speaks and hypnotizes people. After talking to Jessi's brooch, Nick guilts Elliot into giving him his credit card, which allows Nick to buy his own brooch, for app use and status. Andrew, who without Barbara for his allowance is being made to do chores by Marty to earn money, is convinced by the brooch that he desires it more. After Nick requests 8 dollars from Andrew for a pretzel Nick ordered for him with the brooch, Andrew breaks into Nick's house to steal it, resulting in a fight which exposes the purchase to Diane, who chides them and Elliot. Despite the brooch telling her to be more selfish, Jessi feels guilty for sounding spoiled and gives it to Caitlin. Shannon sees the brooch on Caitlin and gets angry, confessing she bought the brooch so Jessi would hang out with her. Jessi says she loves her mom and still want to hang out with her, and Shannon lets Caitlin keep the brooch (although it also convinces Shannon to buy a more expensive one to show off). Meanwhile, Missy is happy taking things slow with Elijah, and helps him at the church, but the pastor's song about masturbating as a sin upsets her. At school, she snaps at Elijah, worrying that he does not want to be friends anymore, but he also confesses that he has no sexual desire, and fears it makes him weird. Missy assures him that he's perfect the way he is.
| 58 | 7 | "Dadda Dia!" | Bryan L Francis | Gabe Liedman | October 28, 2022 |
Lola burns her mouth on a Hot Pocket and while in TV court to sue, her lonely home life is brought up, and she wins her case with a large settlement. Three members of the boy band Bros 4 Life appear and reveal that one of them is her father (as her mother was a groupie for them before her birth). But Rodney, her mom's parole officer is suspicious that they appeared right after news of the settlement, but Lola dismisses him and his call for a DNA test. Seamus' house is cleaned by the Birch boys and Andrew to sell to put him in assisted living, which he refuses and insults Elliot for always agreeing with Diane. Before going, Andrew snoops in the Birch master closet, finding a "Peenie Prison", a Bluetooth enabled chastity device and accidentally locks it on himself. His attempts to remove it at Seamus' house are found by Nick, who angrily confronts his father about it, resulting in Seamus insulting Elliot and Diane more, angering Elliot enough that he punches him. Seamus is proud of his son for hitting him. Missy asks her father Cyrus to meet Elijah at a father-daughter dance at the church (which Jessi figures to be a purity ball), which he accepts despite his feelings on religion. While Elijah impresses him, Cyrus snaps at the virginity ring pledges, causing Missy to storm off. Lola takes the band members to the dance at the church, where they dance until Lola reveals the settlement will be paid in Hot Pockets, angering the three who reveal they are not her father and just wanted to money to fund a comeback. Rodney arrives at Lola's home and she realizes she took him for granted as a father figure. Outside the church, Cyrus apologizes to Missy and agrees to let her help the community and the church. At the Birch home, Elliot is more assertive and aggressive, saying his father will live with them and ordering Diane around. Diane unlocks the device on Andrew.
| 59 | 8 | "Asexual Healing" | Alex Salyer | Shantira Jackson | October 28, 2022 |
Andrew is scared and jealous that Bernie is being wooed by her hot male friend Alison, and egged on by Maury and Flanny, he takes off on a train to Vermont to surprise her. Various mishaps ensue: the train is derailed, the bus he is on is stopped when the toilet he uses overflows, and his hitchhiking results in being picked up by a creepy passenger from the train who is an escaped mental patient. Andrew eventually arrives at Bernie's house, where Alison also is, who reveals that he truly likes Bernie but didn't know how to say it. She chooses Alison over Andrew, who waits to be picked up and taken home by his mother. Missy meets Elijah's family at a cookout, where Elijah see his own Hormone Monsters (Joe and Gil from Human Resources). He admits he does not feel horny at all, and he goes to Jay for advice, who suggests kissing Missy without thinking about it. The two kiss at Missy's house, but Elijah still feels nothing. He talks to his aunt Amber, who reveals that she is asexual. Elijah thinks that he may also be asexual, but feels comforted that he can still love Missy. Shannon and Jessi are insulted by a sexist plumber, and Connie and Montel tell Jessi how they view humans as silly for their take on gender roles, and that Hormone Monsters are raised gender-neutral until they're old enough to decide. At her dad's apartment, she finds Greg and Caitlin painting her old room, now the baby's room, pink with traditional girl accessories. Her complaints about gender roles eventually cause Caitlin to run off crying. Jessi apologizes and they compromise that Jessi can call the baby "they" while Caitlin will call it "her."
| 60 | 9 | "The Parents Aren't Alright" | Henrique Jardim | Kelly Galuska | October 28, 2022 |
Caitlin goes into labor early and Greg takes her to the hospital, while having forgotten that Jessi was with him that weekend. The baby named Delilah is delivered by C-section, and Jessi starts imagining the baby is taunting her after Greg says he will "do it right this time" raising her. Jessi, fearful that her family is being stolen and will no longer love her, starts getting angrier and feels hopeless. Jay and Matthew return to the Panera where Jay had been banished, but after a stunt leaves only one of the sorcerer's (Gary) fingers behind, he agrees to Matthew that they are losers. At school, the others offer him a spot back to help them, but Matthew tells him to say no, which raises concerns that he has "domesticated" Jay, a "wolf" instead of a "swan." Matthew eventually breaks up with Jay, who runs off into the woods and wishes he wasn't himself. Barbara returns to the Glouberman house, but she and Marty argue more than ever, leaving Andrew afraid they will divorce, causing him to wet the bed in his sleep. His attempts to clean it are discovered by his parents, resulting in him getting diapers. At family therapy, they argue again, and Marty is only convinced to stay by his lovebug. Marty blames Barbara for changing, but she points out that he used to be a sweet romantic, and he is shocked to find out she's been unhappy for years. At the Birch home, Seamus and a more aggressive Elliot (with lapses to his old Scottish accent) wake Nick up to train him in nipple twisting. At dinner, an angry Elliot announces he is getting back into professional nipple twisting, and will be training Nick. Diane objects but Elliot snaps that they always did what she wanted. Nick and Diane have no idea what to do. Missy fears that she is hideous and Elijah doesn't like her.
| 61 | 10 | "F**ked Up Friday" | Bryan L Francis | Gil Ozeri | October 28, 2022 |
Andrew wakes up in his father's body while Marty is in Andrew's body. The two go to work and school, until Andrew decides to use Marty's body to woo his mother and fix their marriage. The gesture fails, and in an argument with Andrew, Marty reveals that he loves Barbara but fears she doesn't want him if he told her. Andrew, in Marty's body, apologizes to Barbara for all Marty has done and how he admires her, and was scared to look weak. It works, but also makes her horny. Nick to his horror wakes up in his grandfather Seamus' body, and Seamus in his body. While Seamus goes off to drink, Nick is able to convince Diane, and the two manage to change Elliot back by having "Seamus" tell him he is sorry and loves him. Seamus in Nick's body insults them, and Elliot admits he is setting a bad example for his father's love, and want to give love instead of hurt. Jessi finds herself in Delilah's body while Delilah is in Jessi's body. At school, Lola helps, thinking Jessi is on drugs, while Jessi enjoys attention and being given baby baths, but soon discovers she has bloating gas and is unable to tell Greg and Caitlin. Jay wakes up in Coach Steve's body, but Coach Steve's mind is still there and Jay's body is unconscious in the woods. At school, the Sorcerers of the Square Table ask for Jay's help save Gary from the Bread Bowl Dimension, but Jay's mind says he is no longer a magician, and he refuses to help. Steve helps convince Jay to be the sweet kid he knew could love magic again. Missy finds herself swapped with Nathan Fillion. Fillion is familiar with body swaps and goes off to learn a life lesson to make the switch back, while Missy flees to her home where Fillion still is. As they talk, Elijah arrives, and due to the personal nature, "Nathan" is brought along. Elijah admits he is asexual and doesn't want to break up, to Missy's relief. As a storm comes in, Missy accepts Elijah and stays his girlfriend. Seamus hugs Elliot and Nick, Jay helps perform the ritual and helps bring Gary back, Jessi wants her old self back, and as Andrew is about to be made love to, everyone switches to their old bodies. Jessi burps Delilah to get rid of the gas, Nathan Fillion leaves, and Andrew listens to his parents have really loud sex.

== Reception ==
=== Accolades ===
| Year | Award | Category | Nominee(s) | Result | Ref. |
|---|---|---|---|---|---|
| 2023 | Casting Society of America Awards | Television Animation | Julie Ashton | Won | |
| 2023 | Primetime Emmy Awards | Outstanding Character Voice-Over Performance | Maya Rudolph as Connie the Hormone Monstress (for "Asexual Healing") | Won | |
