= Border Vengeance (1935 film) =

- Film poster
- Directed by: Ray Heinz
- Written by: Forbes Parkhill
- Based on: The Return of the Muley Kid by R. Craig Christensen
- Produced by: Willis Kent
- Starring: Reb Russell; Kenneth MacDonald; Clarence Geldart
- Cinematography: James Diamond
- Edited by: S. Roy Luby
- Production company: Willis Kent Productions
- Distributed by: Marcy Pictures Corporation
- Release date: June 5, 1935 (US theatrical)
- Running time: 56 minutes
- Country: United States
- Language: English

Border Vengeance is a 1935 American Western B movie directed by Ray Heinz, written by Forbes Parkhill based upon the novel The Return of the Muley Kid by R. Craig Christensen. The film had its premiere on June 1, 1935, and was released to theaters on June 5.

== Plot ==
A rancher is murdered by Flash Purdue after he catches Flash in the act of rustling his cattle. Flash diverts attention from himself by accusing the nearby Benson ranch of being the ones who perpetrated the deed. When his family is accused, Peeler Benson shoots at Flash and hits his ear. As a mob grows, he is able to get to his family in time to warn them so that they are able to escape across the border to safety. Hoping to clear his family's name, Peeler decides to stay behind, and joins a traveling rodeo circuit under the name The Muley Kid. Five years later he returns to town and is captured by Flash, who intends kill him out of vengeance for the injury to his ear.

== Cast ==
- Reb Russell as Peeler Benson, aka The Muley Kid
- Kenneth MacDonald as Flash Purdue
- Clarence Geldart as Sam Griswold
- Pat Harmon as Tex Pryor
- Ben Corbett as Bud Benson
- Slim Whitaker as Posse Leader
- Mary Jane Carey as Sally Griswold
- Norman Feusier as Old Man Benson
- Marty Joyce as Young Benson
- June Brewster as June Griswold
- Hank Bell as Sheriff
- Rex Bell as Rodeo Guest Star
- Glenn Strange as Cowhand

== Background ==
The project starred former football player Lafayette H. "Reb" Russell, and was filmed in 1934 by Willis Kent, an independent filmmaker known for his low budget exploitation melodramas.

== Critical reception ==
According to Hans J. Wollstein of Rovi, even as "bottom-of-the-barrel filmmaking on all fronts", the film did have good points. The climatic finale of a nighttime shootout was "quite effective", and with "blood oozing", it was one of the few films of its genre to show the effects of a bullet on its victim. However, the padding out of the film by its inclusion of rodeo footage of former Western hero Rex Bell and horse stunt and trick rider Montie Montana "manages to drag out the 58 minutes of running time almost beyond human endurance".
