= The Love Bug (1925 film) =

1925 film

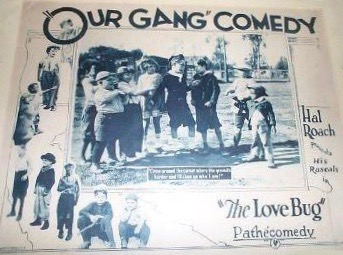
- Directed by: Robert F. McGowan
- Written by: Hal Roach; H. M. Walker
- Produced by: Hal Roach
- Starring: Mickey Daniels; Joe Cobb; Jackie Condon; Mary Kornman; Allen Hoskins; Eugene Jackson; Sonny Loy; Johnny Downs; Peggy Ahern
- Distributed by: Pathé Exchange
- Release date: April 5, 1925
- Running time: 20 minutes
- Country: United States
- Languages: Silent; English intertitles

The Love Bug is a 1925 short silent comedy film, the 37th in the Our Gang series, directed by Robert F. McGowan.

== Plot ==
Farina, Joe and Mickey are all struck by the love bug. After several problems, they go to the beauty salon, where Pineapple works, and make a shambles of it. The police arrive and arrest them, but Grandma comes to their rescue.

== Cast ==
=== The Gang ===
- Joe Cobb – Joe
- Jackie Condon – Jackie
- Mickey Daniels – Mickey
- Allen Hoskins – Farina
- Eugene Jackson – Pineapple
- Mary Kornman – Mary
- Sonny Loy – Sing Joy

=== Additional cast ===
- Johnny Downs – tough kid
- Peggy Ahern – Peggy
- Ivadell Carter – girl getting picked on
- Dorothy Morrison – Farina's girlfriend
- Florence Lee – Grandma
- Joseph Morrison – father of Farina's girlfriend
- William Gillespie – beauty parlor manager
