= Blazing Guns (1935 film) =

1935 film

- Directed by: Ray Heinz
- Written by: Forbes Parkhill
- Produced by: Willis Kent
- Starring: Reb Russell; Marion Shilling; Lafe McKee
- Cinematography: James Diamond
- Edited by: S. Roy Luby
- Production company: Willis Kent Productions
- Distributed by: First Division Exchanges; Majestic Pictures; Marcy Pictures; Hollywood Film Exchange
- Release date: February 3, 1935
- Running time: 58 minutes
- Country: United States
- Language: English

Blazing Guns is a 1935 American Western film directed by Ray Heinz and starring Reb Russell, Marion Shilling and Lafe McKee. It was shot at the Iverson Ranch outside Los Angeles. A Poverty Row B western, it was distributed individually in separate states by a variety of companies.

== Cast ==
- Reb Russell as Bob Grady
- Marion Shilling as Betty Lou Rickard
- Lafe McKee as John Rickard
- Joseph W. Girard as Sheriff Crabtree
- Frank McCarroll as Slug Raton posing as Duke Craven
- Slim Whitaker as Deputy Carter
- Rebel as Rebel - Bob's Horse
- Gene Alsace as Gene, Henchman
- Hank Bell as Sam, Vigilante

== Bibliography ==
- Pitts, Michael R. Poverty Row Studios, 1929-1940. McFarland & Company, 2005.
