= Big Mouth season 5 =

Season of television series

Big Mouth
- Season 5
- Season 5 promotional poster
- Starring: Nick Kroll; John Mulaney; Jessi Klein; Jason Mantzoukas; Ayo Edebiri; Fred Armisen; Maya Rudolph; Jordan Peele
- No. of episodes: 10

Release
- Original network: Netflix
- Original release: November 5, 2021

Season chronology
- ← Previous; Season 4 Next → Season 6

The fifth season of Big Mouth, an American adult animated coming-of-age sitcom created by Andrew Goldberg, Nick Kroll, Mark Levin, and Jennifer Flackett, was released on Netflix on November 5, 2021. The series centers on teens based on Kroll and Goldberg's upbringing in suburban New York, with Kroll voicing his fictional younger self. Big Mouth explores puberty while "embrac[ing] a frankness about the human body and sex."

== Cast and characters ==
=== Main ===
- Nick Kroll as Nick Birch, Maurice the Hormone Monster, Coach Steve Steve, Lola Skumpy, Mila Jansen, Lotte Jansen and Bad Mitten
  - Kroll also appears as himself in live-action in the season five finale, as the person in charge of Human Resources.
- John Mulaney as Andrew Glouberman and Detective Florez
- Jessi Klein as Jessi Glaser
- Jason Mantzoukas as Jay Bilzerian
- Ayo Edebiri as Missy Foreman-Greenwald
- Fred Armisen as Elliot Birch
- Maya Rudolph as Connie the Hormone Monstress and Diane Birch
- Jordan Peele as Cyrus Forman-Greenwald, Featuring Ludacris and Ghost of Duke Ellington

=== Recurring ===
- Andrew Rannells as Matthew MacDell
- Pamela Adlon as Sonya
- Brandon Kyle Goodman as Walter
- Keke Palmer as Rochelle
- Ali Wong as Ali
- David Thewlis as Lionel St. Swithens
- Thandwie Newton as Mona
- Joe Wengert as Caleb, Lump Humpman
- June Diane Raphael as Devin LeSeven
- Jak Knight as DeVon
- Joel Kim Booster as Charles Lu
- Neil Casey as Lars and Detective Dumont
- Richard Kind as Marty Glouberman
- Paula Pell as Barbara Glouberman
- Chelsea Peretti as Monica Foreman-Greenwald
- Natasha Lyonne as Suzette
- Nathan Fillion as Himself
- Seth Morris as Greg Glaser
- Chloe Fineman as Leah Birch
- Jon Daly as Judd Birch
- Fran Gillespie as Samira
- Mark Duplass as Val Bilzerian
- Zachary Quinto as Aiden

=== Guest ===
- Kumail Nanjiani as Himself
- Maria Bamford as Tito
- Jessica Chaffin - Shannon Glaser
- Andy Daly as Dr. Wendy Ingle
- Gina Rodriguez as Gina Alvarez
- Aidy Bryant as Emmy
- Natasha Lyonne - Suzette
- Hugh Jackman as Himself
- Adam Scott as Dylan Keating
- Quinta Brunson as Quinta Foreman
- Lena Waithe as Lena Foreman
- Kristen Wiig as Jessi's Vagina
- Jemaine Clement as Simon Sex
- Jean Smart as Depression Kitty
- Rosa Salazar as Miss Benitez
- Kristen Schaal as Bernie Sanders
- Gary Cole as Edward MacDell
- Julie White as Kimberly MacDell

== Episodes ==
No. overall	No. in season	Title	Directed by	Written by	Original release date
42	1	"No Nut November"	Bryan Francis	Gil Ozeri	November 5, 2021
Attempting to take his mind off of Lola, Jay decides to attempt No Nut November, with Andrew, Jessi and Nick all joining in a competition to see who makes it. Unable to stop Andrew from feeling horny, Maury teaches him about the practice of Edging. At Nick's house the trio attempt to watch the film Doubt in an effort to not be aroused, only for Andrew to lose control while practicing edging, resulting in ejaculating in his pants in front of Nick's family. At the same time, Jessi steals Judd's shirt and loses the competition as well. Nick has an erotic wet dream about Jessi that night. Meanwhile, Missy fantasizes about Devon, feeling confused, and eventually breaks up with her fantasy version of Nathan Fillion. Jay unfollows Lola, who taunts him on social media, so she shows up at his house to tempt him. This ends in a fight where both refuse to apologize to the other, and Lola vows to make Jay cum in the month. Jay has an "emotional orgasm" while trying not to think of her and is told he has failed by the spirit of Kumail Nanjiani. The episode ends with a montage of various characters masturbating while Andrew narrates that he was kicked out of a real estate model home for it.
43	2	"The Shane Lizard Rises"	Andres Salaff	Emily Altman & Victor Quinaz	November 5, 2021
The Shame Wizard, depressed at having been defeated by the kids seasons earlier, finds out from Coach Steve that there is swim class at the school that day and appears in order to sow discord. At first not appearing to succeed, soon the students begin feeling bad about their bodies. When the Go-Gurt Burglar is revealed to have large genitals for his size, the boys are all upset. Nick finds out that the others mock him for his small penis when he is not around, and fears he has a micropenis. Unable to afford a penis pump advertised online, he uses a vacuum cleaner which results in injuries. Andrew, in an attempt to clean up his unkempt pubic hair, cuts his scrotum with a pair of scissors, and after pouring expired Nair and hydrogen peroxide, his penis takes on the appearance of the Joker. Matthew starts becoming aroused after learning that Jay is not circumcised, and has difficulties with Aiden. Jessi finds out that every other girl shaves their legs and cuts her legs with a beat-up razor in an attempt to shave. Missy finds out she has acne on her back and, feeling worried about Devon losing interest, attempts to pop the zits, only resulting in dislocating her shoulder and getting a needle in the face. Lola is insecure when Devin says her labia are abnormally large, and after learning of a goop egg online, she attempts to fix it by sticking a whole egg, only to get it stuck. At the emergency room, Nick, Jessi, Missy, Andrew, and Lola all meet each other; the advice of Lola's mother's parole officer off-sets their shame at their imperfections. The next day, Jay offers to show his erect penis to Matthew, who is more aroused. The Shame Wizard considers the day as not a total failure.
44	3	"Lovebugs"	Henrique Jardim	Kelly Galuska	November 5, 2021
Missy organizes an affinity group at the school, which Nick joins in order to impress Jessi. The order of business is to protest the school's outdated and offensive mascot, "the Scheming Gypsy." Ali convinces the others in the group that they should not be patient and protest the mascot at the wrestling meet the next day over Missy's protests. Nick gets a new creature, Walter the Love Bug, who convinces Nick that he is in love with Jessi. At Ali's house that night to make signs, the two seem to hit it off. At the wrestling meet that day, Andrew loses but boasts about his singlet emphasizing his sizable buttocks. No one in attendance notices the protest, so the group storms the match, only to get told off by attendees. During the protest, Jessi touches Nick's arm. Jay impresses another student Charles Lu with his "wrestling magic" and invites him to Panera to learn more with the Sorcerers, after which Charles and Jay wrestle before kissing. Andrew begins carb-loading to further fatten his butt; after eating too much clam chowder, he has diarrhea and tears his singlet in his rush to use the Panera toilet. Matthew starts acting irritable and paranoid to get Aiden to break up with him, succeeding to his dismay. At Jessi's father's apartment, Ali and Jessi are excited and talk, with Jessi revealing she has and uses Judd's shirt, before they decide to not follow Missy's patient approach and attempt to tear down the statue at the school, only managing to smash a crystal ball before being arrested. Later released by the police, Jessi is brought home and encounters Nick, who has been encouraged by Walter to make a "grand gesture." This gesture is a love song that only results in awkwardness and Jessi revealing she doesn't like him in the same way and Nick runs off in tears. Later, Ali appears outside Jessi's window, both excited about the day. Another love bug named Sonya lights up behind Jessi as she feels love for Ali.
45	4	"The Green-Eyed Monster"	Bryan Francis	Joe Wengert	November 5, 2021
In the vein of Othello, all the main characters grapple with destructive jealousy. Jessi's love for Ali is shown to be platonic but manifests as an overwhelming desire to be Ali's "number one" and jealousy toward anyone else she spends time with. This jealousy is reciprocated by Ali's girlfriend, Samira, and culminates in a fight between Jessi and Samira, after which Samira breaks up with Ali. Ali subsequently asks Jessi to leave, and their friendship seems to be over. Matthew, having broken up with Aiden in the previous episode, attempts to reignite his relationship with Jay but discovers Jay's attraction (and closeted making out) with Charles Lu, sparking intense jealousy. Matthew's attempt to give Jay misleading advice only results in Jay proudly claiming to be Charles' "sidepiece." With Jessi and Ali receiving widespread credit for the school's mascot change to Steven Van Zandt (after their statue vandalism in the previous episode), Missy experiences jealousy toward Jessi and confronts her. Jessi's half-hearted apology and the lack of attendance at Missy's affinity group leave Missy jealous and disheartened. Nick, while attempting to deliver a gift for Jessi, discovers Judd's shirt under her pillow and concludes that Judd and Jessi are secretly seeing each other. Nick's jealousy prompts him to reveal the situation to his family, which they calmly deduce as Jessi simply having a crush on Judd. In class, Nick reveals to Jessi that he and his family (including Judd) know about her having Judd's shirt and that Judd feels nothing for her. When Nick then reaffirms his love for her, Jessi maintains that she does not love Nick, leaving him publicly embarrassed and more heartbroken. Meanwhile, Andrew develops an unhealthy obsession with his substitute teacher, Mr. Keating, going so far as to approach him outside of school hours, make uninvited house calls, and jealously stalk his fiancé. Andrew's increasingly inappropriate behavior results in Mr. Keating having a nervous breakdown in class and being fired.
46	5	"Thanksgiving"	Andres Salaff	Brandon Kyle Goodman	November 5, 2021
Andrew's father makes his famous turkey for Thanksgiving at the Birch household, and Andrew resolves to not eat any to stand up for himself. His refusal leads to a near-violent altercation and widespread embarrassment for the Glouberman family, though Andrew later deduces that the turkey was his father's love language, and the two reconcile. Nick remains heartbroken after Jessi's rejection, which is only exacerbated by Leah Birch inviting her new boyfriend, Val Bilzerian, to Thanksgiving. Missy's cousins arrive for Thanksgiving at the Foreman-Greenwald household, and Missy, afraid of being a "dork," smokes one of their joints. Her family deduces that she is high due to her erratic behavior, cutting the festivities short and leaving a rift between her and her cousins. Jay dresses as Santa Claus and robs homes of uneaten food, though he later leaves his haul at Lola's door after noticing that she is alone and hungry on Thanksgiving. Jessi's dad, Greg Glaser, reveals he and his girlfriend are expecting a baby, leaving Jessi distraught that her family will never be reunited. Jessi visits Ali for comfort and the two reconcile, though Jessi has a fantasy of making out with Ali that leaves her questioning her sexuality.
47	6	"Best Friends Make the Best Lovers"	Henrique Jardim	Mitra Jouhari	November 5, 2021
Jessi continues to question her budding attraction to Ali. Missy's continued resentment toward Jessi and Ali prompts the appearance of Rochelle, her Hate Worm. Under the worm's influence, Missy posts an anonymous comment claiming that Ali and Jessi kissed during their arrest (in "Lovebugs") while Ali was dating Samira. After the comment gains widespread attention, Jessi decides her friendship with Ali is more important than her attraction and comforts Ali, much to the latter's appreciation. Nick continues to be depressed and Devon proposes a boy's night out, which entails the boys destroying an abandoned house. Andrew, after the tender moment with his dad in the previous episode, adopts a new emotional and altruistic personality and unsuccessfully attempts to persuade the boys to be more in touch with their feelings. After Devon teases Nick about Missy's post, the two fight, leaving Nick with a broken nose and even more resentful toward Jessi. Jay experiences sadness at being Charles Lu's closeted sidepiece, but his repeated attempts to emotionally connect with Charles are rejected. After being listened to and comforted by Andrew, Jay asks Charles for an emotional commitment. Charles nonchalantly refuses and the two break up. Walter (Nick's Love Bug), consumed with hate, appears to die at the end of the episode.
48	7	"I F**king Hate You"	Bryan Francis	Jak Knight	November 5, 2021
Walter, Nick's former Love Bug, emerges from a cocoon reborn as a Hate Worm. Missy's anonymous comment (from "Best Friends Make the Best Lovers") continues to gain traction, with the rumor spreading through the school. Missy and Nick bond over their mutual hatred of Jessi, descending into a spiral of hatred and feeding their increasingly large Hate Worms. Jay publicly apologizes to Lola and they move into the Birch's attic together, though Lola kicks Jay out after learning of him and Charles Lu making out. Lola later releases an online video in which Jay (unaware that Lola was filming) explains a magic trick to her, leaving Jay distraught that he broke the magician's code. Jay is later expelled from magic (and his magic wand broken) by the Panera Sorcerers. Andrew reveals to Ali and Jessi that Missy started the rumor, causing Jessi to experience a near-breakdown (with Tito the Anxiety Mosquito, the Depression Kitty, and the Shame Wizard) until Ali pulls her out of it. Nick and Missy's hatred causes them to turn on one another, each downplaying the other's supposed reasons for hating Jessi. Ali then confronts and physically attacks Missy in the school cafeteria, though Missy dominates the fight until it is broken up by teachers. In the aftermath, Missy and Ali are suspended from school. Lola is also suspended due to her video of Jay containing nudity and thus constituting child pornography. At home, Rochelle enters Missy's head, turning her into a hate-filled Medusa-like figure.
49	8	"A Very Big Mouth Christmas"	Henrique Jardim	Joe Wengert & Emily Altman	November 5, 2021
An R-rated Muppets-style Christmas special comprising six mini-stories: Connie's story of the first Christmas, how Santa's elves learned about sex, a two-part John Wick parody featuring Jay's dog Ft. Ludacris taking revenge on his former owner's murders, Andrew being granted his wish of being in a Christian family on Christmas, Lola celebrating Christmas with a live "snowmum" and later her mother's parole officer, and Lotte and Mila Jansen recounting the Santa/"Vader Johan" folklore of the Netherlands.
50	9	"Sugarbush"	Andres Salaff	Victor Quinaz	November 5, 2021
The Birch family plus Andrew and Val Bilzerian go on a ski trip to Sugarbush Resort. Leah Birch plans to lose her virginity to Val and does so on the first night of the trip, though she finds the experience awkward and unsatisfying. However, after some words of wisdom from Diane, Elliot, and Bonnie (Leah's Hormone Monster), Leah and Val openly communicate about what arouses them and have increasingly better experiences. Diane and Elliot are mutually uncomfortable about the situation, leading to marital strife, but they eventually communicate and reconcile. Andrew meets a fellow ski novice and the two immediately hit it off. All the while, Nick remains heavily under the influence of his Hate Worm Walter, and later breaks his leg while attempting to ski down a black diamond slope at night and triggers an avalanche. He is rescued by Judd, but the avalanche interrupts Diane and Elliot's makeup sex, stops Andrew from getting to second base, interrupts Leah and Val mid-coitus, and interrupts Maury's threesome with Connie and Bonnie. Meanwhile, Matthew commits to cleaning up a depressed, magic-less Jay and eventually admits his feelings for Jay, leading to the two making out.
51	10	"Re-New Year's Eve"	Bryan Francis	Gil Ozeri	November 5, 2021
Devin and Devon throw a "Re-New Year's Eve" party to celebrate their getting back together and the new year. Nick, his leg still in a cast, blames Walter for ruining his life and fights him, during which both are transported to the Monster World. Andrew and Maury travel to the Monster World to recover Nick. Nick makes his way to the Complaints Department and asks to speak to "whoever is in charge," leading to a meeting with Nick Kroll (co-creator of Big Mouth, Nick's voice actor, and essentially the "grown-up, real-life" him). Kroll tells Nick that "your monsters are you" and that Nick is in charge of his own behavior, as well as reminds Nick of his loving family and friends. Nick and Andrew reunite and express their platonic love for one another, and Walter appears, reborn in his original Love Bug form. Missy continues to be dominated by her Hate Worm Rochelle and remains in her room, with her fearful parents being repeatedly overwhelmed by her hateful rants. Missy's cousin Quinta later videocalls her and offers an apology for the events of "Thanksgiving," and Missy (with the help of her Hormone Monster Mona) begins to escape Rochelle's grip. Jessi ponders Missy's recent actions and reflects on her own recent dismissive attitude toward Missy. She later visits Missy and offers an apology, which Missy accepts despite Rochelle's protests. Missy then re-embraces her "dorkiness" and re-expresses her love for those around her, including Mona and Rochelle, causing the latter to be reborn as a Love Bug. Matthew angrily breaks up with Jay after he takes them for a joyride in his car and causes several accidents. Lola experiences deep remorse for her treatment of Jay. At Devin and Devon's party, several apologies are made: Missy apologizes to Ali and Jessi, Nick apologizes to Jessi, and Lola apologizes to Jay. Lola attempts to reignite her relationship with Jay, but Matthew arrives and professes his liking for Jay. Jay chooses Matthew, leaving Lola to storm out in tears. Several of the show's monsters watch on as the children celebrate the new year, expressing happiness at the children's various progresses throughout the year.

== Reception ==
=== Critical response ===
On Rotten Tomatoes, the fifth season has an approval rating of 100% based on 5 reviews. On Metacritic, it has a score of 5 out of 0 for the fifth season, based on 1 critic, indicating "universal acclaim".

=== Accolades ===
Year	Award	Category	Nominee(s)	Result	Ref.
2022	Casting Society of America Awards	Television Animation	Julie Ashton	Won	
2022	NAACP Image Awards	Outstanding Animated Series	Big Mouth	Nominated	
2022	Hollywood Critics Association TV Awards	Best Streaming Animated Series or Television Movie	Big Mouth	Nominated	
2022	Primetime Emmy Awards	Outstanding Character Voice-Over Performance	Maya Rudolph as Connie the Hormone Monstress	Nominated	
