= James Gruen =

American film director

James Gruen (March 8, 1894, Michigan – March 19, 1967, Woodland Hills, Los Angeles, California) was a Hollywood screenwriter.

James Gruen was married to actress Beatrice Van.

== Filmography ==
- Camera Sleuth (1951)
- South of Death Valley (1949) (story)
- Everybody Sing (1938) (additional dialogue)
- Windjammer (1937)
- Wild Brian Kent (1936)
- The Leathernecks Have Landed (1936) (story)
- Behind the Green Lights (1935)
- The Marines Are Coming (1934) (screenplay)
- In Old Santa Fe (1934) (screenplay)
- Night Parade (1929)
- Hard to Get (1929) (also titles)
- The Girl in the Glass Cage (1929)
- Silks and Saddles (1929) (adaptation)
- Riley the Cop (1928) (story)
- None But the Brave (1928) (story)
- A Prodigal Bridegroom (1926) (story)
- Collegiate (1926) (adaptation)
- Alice Be Good (1926)
- Meet My Girl (1926) (story)
- The Traffic Cop (1926)
- Let's Go, Gallagher (1925) (also story)
- Three Bases East (1925) (scenario)
