= The Speed Limit =

1926 film

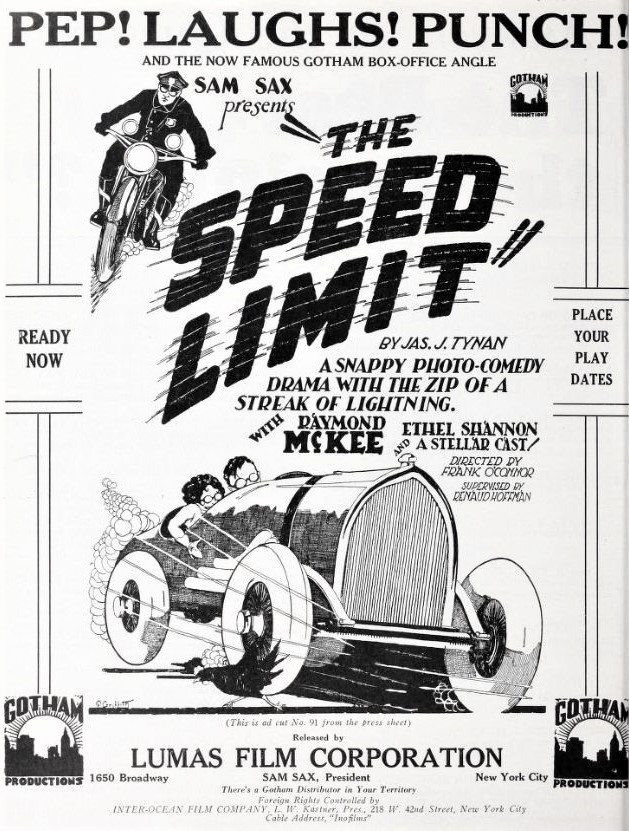
- Advertisement
- Directed by: Frank O'Connor
- Written by: James J. Tynan
- Produced by: Renaud Hoffman
- Starring: Raymond McKee; Ethel Shannon; Bruce Gordon
- Production company: Camera Pictures
- Distributed by: Lumas Film Corporation; Stoll Pictures (UK)
- Release date: March 1926
- Running time: 60 minutes
- Country: United States
- Language: Silent (English intertitles)

The Speed Limit is a 1926 American silent romantic comedy film directed by Frank O'Connor and starring Raymond McKee, Ethel Shannon, and Bruce Gordon. It was produced by the independent company Gotham Pictures.

== Plot ==
As described in a film magazine review, garage mechanic Tom Milburn is in love with Bess Stanson, a cashier at the garage. A rival for her affection appears in the person of Claude Roswell, a wealthy sport who drives a Rolls-Royce. Tom and a pal have invented new tires that they expect to be a racing success. Tom enters a big automobile race, finds a chance to use his new tires, and wins despite foul play on the part of Roswell. Roswell is then arrested. Tom and Bess decide to tie up for live.

== Cast ==
- Raymond McKee as Tom Milburn
- Ethel Shannon as Bess Stanson
- Bruce Gordon as Claude Roswell
- Georgie Chapman as Henry Berger
- James Conly as Eightball Jackson
- Edward W. Borman as Biff Garrison
- Rona Lee as Muriel Hodge
- Paul Weigel as Mr. Charles Benson
- Lucille Thorndyke as Mrs. Charles Benson

== Bibliography ==
- Connelly, Robert B. The Silents: Silent Feature Films, 1910-36, Volume 40, Issue 2. December Press, 1998.
- Munden, Kenneth White. The American Film Institute Catalog of Motion Pictures Produced in the United States, Part 1. University of California Press, 1997.
