= Reed Howes =

American actor (1900–1964)

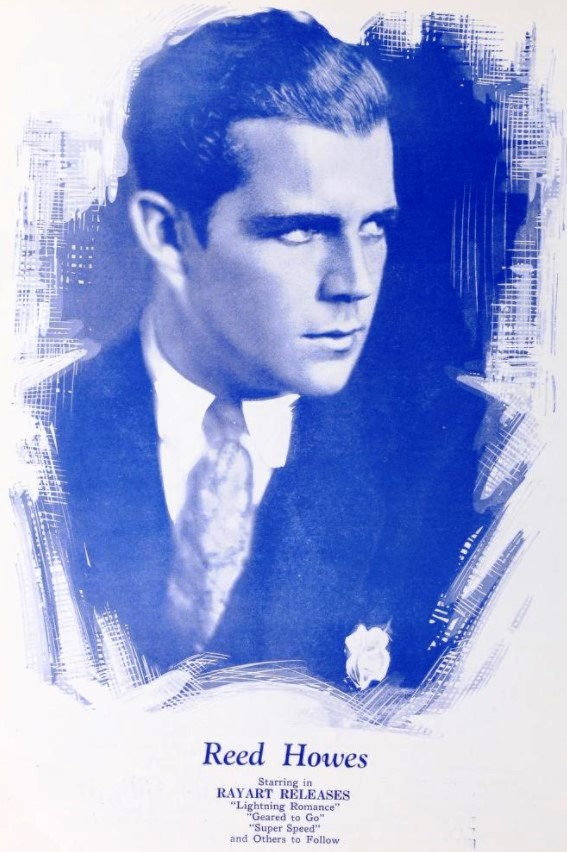
- Reed Howes, 1925
- Born: Hermon Reed Howes; July 5, 1900; Washington, D.C., U.S.
- Died: August 6, 1964 (aged 64); West Hollywood, California, U.S.
- Resting place: Fort Rosecrans National Cemetery
- Other name: Reed Howe
- Occupations: Actor, model
- Years active: c.1923–1964
- Spouses: Lillian Pechin; Catherine Tabor; Mary Howard

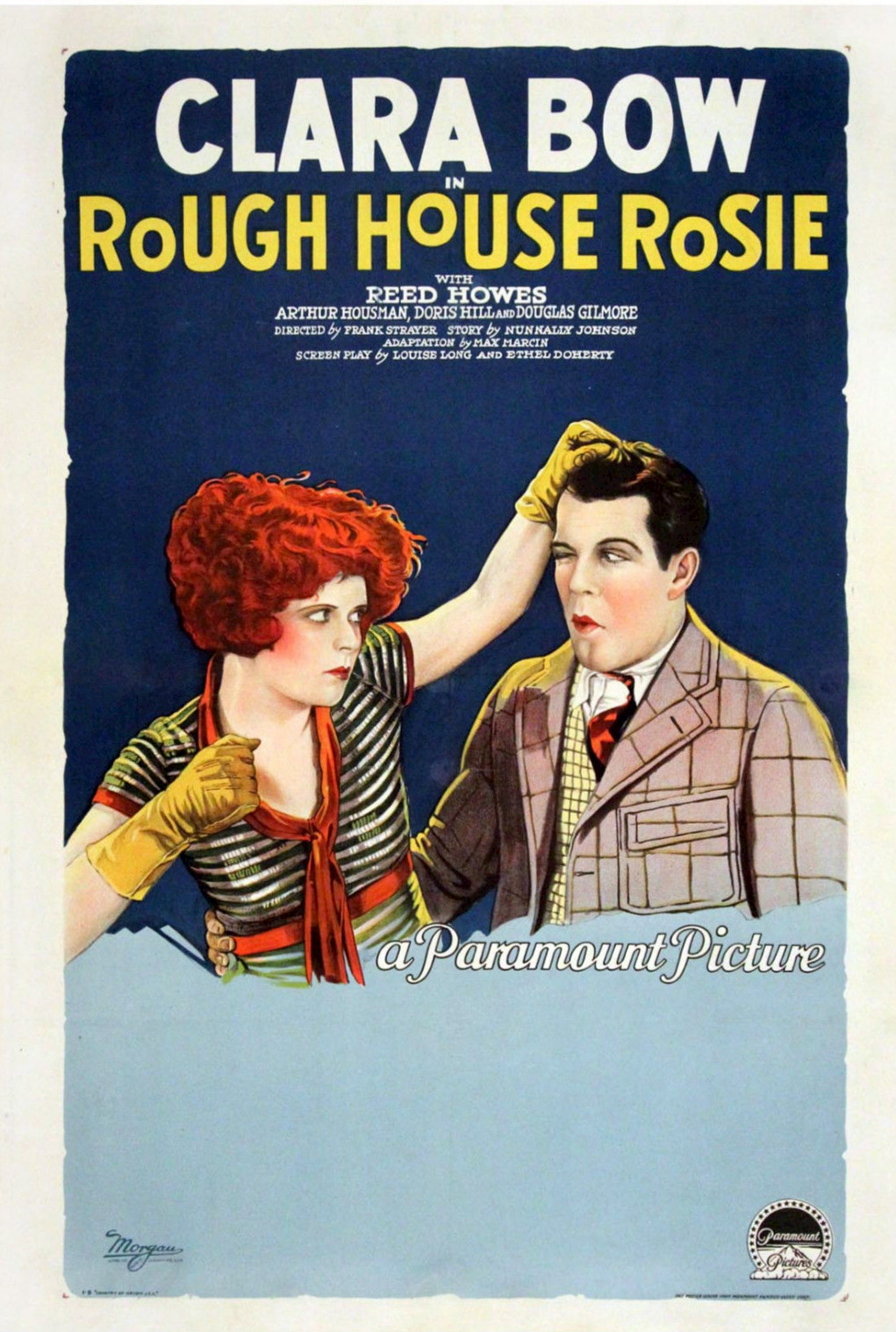
Howes and Clara Bow in the film Rough House Rosie (1927)

Hermon Reed Howes (July 5, 1900 – August 6, 1964) was an American model who later became an actor in silent and sound films.

== Early life ==
Howes spent the beginning of his childhood in Washington, D.C. before moving with his parents to Ogden, Utah. He served in the US Navy in the closing stages of World War I and was the Pacific Fleet Swim Team's captain. In 1919, while attending Harvard, he saved the lives of a young woman and another man after they nearly drowned in the ocean at York Beach, Maine.

Howes married three times in his life: to Lillian Pechin in 1923, Catherine Tabor in 1932, and Mary Donovan Howard in 1937.

== Arrow Collar Man ==
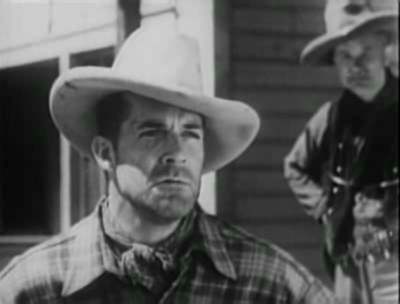
Reed Howes in The Dawn Rider (1935)

In the early 1920s Howes began modeling shirts and detachable collars produced by Cluett Peabody & Company. Howes was one of several men known as Arrow Collar Men (others were Earle Williams Neil Hamilton, Fredric March, Brian Donlevy, Jack Mulhall, and possibly Ralph Forbes) who were the models seen in the Cluett Peabody company's advertisements for the apparel drawn by illustrator J. C. Leyendecker. A 1924 advertisement by film company FBO capitalizing on Howes Arrow Collar popularity has Howes: "Acknowledged and acclaimed America's handsomest man To be starred in a series of Eight Productions" .

== Hollywood Stardom ==
Howes began making silent pictures in Hollywood in 1923. At this stage of his career his youthful good looks led to him supporting or co-starring with many of filmdoms well-known and beautiful female stars of the time, i.e., Marie Prevost, Clara Bow, Mildred Harris, Marjorie Daw, Viola Dana, Louise Fazenda and Virginia Brown Faire. He also appeared in low budget pictures with lesser known female stars, i.e., Gladys Hulette, Ruth Dwyer, Carmelita Geraghty, Ethel Shannon and Alice Calhoun.

Indeed, many of Howes's silent pictures are 'racing car-romance' movies, the kind Wallace Reid made popular before his untimely death in 1923. Howes seems to have picked up where Wally Reid left off and in fact Howes resembles Wally in looks or more precisely a cross between Wallace Reid and Neil Hamilton. The majority of Howes silents were produced by Harry Joe Brown (who also directed) and released through the Rayart company. Al Rogell directed a lot of them. The studios Howes worked for in the silent era were FBO, Warner Brothers, Fox, Paramount and Universal.

== Sound ==
Howes made his sound film debut in Warner's The Singing Fool starring Al Jolson. He closed out the silent era in a programmer production of longtime colleague Harry Joe Brown. In the talking era Howes shifted to playing heavies (villains), first in crime films and then in Westerns, with which he would be associated for the remainder of his career. He continued in these roles throughout the 1940s and 1950s before retiring due to ill health. His health declined further, and he died in 1964 at the Motion Picture Country Home and Hospital, where he had been confined for months. He was 64.

== Selected filmography ==
- The Broken Violin (1923)
- Notch Number One (1924)
- The Cyclone Rider (1924)
- Open All Night (1924)
- Lightning Romance (1924)
- Geared to Go (1924) (extant; Library of Congress)
- Super Speed (1925)
- The Snob Buster (1925)
- Crack o' Dawn (1925)
- Bashful Buccaneer (1925)
- Youth's Gamble (1925)
- Cyclone Cavalier (1925)
- Bobbed Hair (1925)
- The Gentle Cyclone (1926)
- Moran of the Mounted (1926)
- The High Flyer (1926)
- Racing Romance (1926)
- The Night Owl (1926)
- The Dangerous Dude (1926)
- The Self Starter (1926)
- Danger Quest (1926)
- Kentucky Handicap (1926)
- Wings of the Storm (1926)
- Romantic Rogue (1927)
- Rough House Rosie (1927)
- The Lost Limited (1927)
- The Scorcher (1927)
- The Royal American (1927)
- The Racing Fool (1927)
- Ladies' Night in a Turkish Bath (1928)
- The Sawdust Paradise (1928)
- Fashion Madness (1928)
- A Million for Love (1928)
- Hellship Bronson (1928)
- The Singing Fool (1928)
- Stolen Kisses (1929)
- Come Across (1929)
- Clancy in Wall Street (1930)
- Terry of the Times (1930)
- Hell Divers (1931) as Lieutenant Fisher
- Anybody's Blonde (1931)
- Sheer Luck (1931)
- Trapped (1931)
- Hell-Bent for Frisco (1931)
- Devil on Deck (1932)
- Gorilla Ship (1932)
- Chloe, Love Is Calling You (1934)
- The Dawn Rider (1935)
- Taming the Wild (1936)
- Million Dollar Haul (1935)
- Feud of the West (1936)
- Flight to Fame (1938)
- Flaming Lead (1939)
- Wolf Call (1939)
- Billy the Kid Outlawed (1940)
- Heroes of the Saddle (1940)
- Lightning Strikes West (1940)
- Covered Wagon Days (1940)
- Phantom Rancher (1940)
- Roll Wagons Roll (1940)
- The Lone Rider in Ghost Town (1941)
- Fugitive Valley (1941)
- Tonto Basin Outlaws (1941)
- Lone Star Law Men (1941)
- Red River Robin Hood (1942)
- Thundering Trails (1943)
- Law of the Saddle (1943)
- Brand of the Devil (1944)
- Saddle Leather Law (1944)
- Range Land (1949)
- Gunslingers (1950)

== Selected Television ==
| Year | Title | Role | Notes |
|---|---|---|---|
| 1953 | Death Valley Days | Salem Officer | Season 1 Episode 11 "The Lady with the Blue Silk Umbrella" |
| 1953 | Death Valley Days | Bartender Arnie | Season 2, Episode 1, "The Diamond Babe" |
| 1957 | Cheyenne | | uncredited as Rancher in episode "Top Hand" |
