= Thick and thin =

Thick and thin may refer to:

- "Thick and Thin", a song by Avenged Sevenfold on Sounding the Seventh Trumpet
- "Thick N' Thin", a song by The Black Crowes on Shake Your Money Maker
- "Thick and Thin", a song by LANY on Malibu Nights
- "Thick & Thin", a song by Ten City on No House Big Enough
- Thick and thin, opposing philosophical concepts discussed by political theorist Michael Walzer
- Thick and thin, forms of the rule of law present in Chinese law

== See also ==
- Through Thick and Thin (disambiguation)
