= High and Handsome =

1925 film

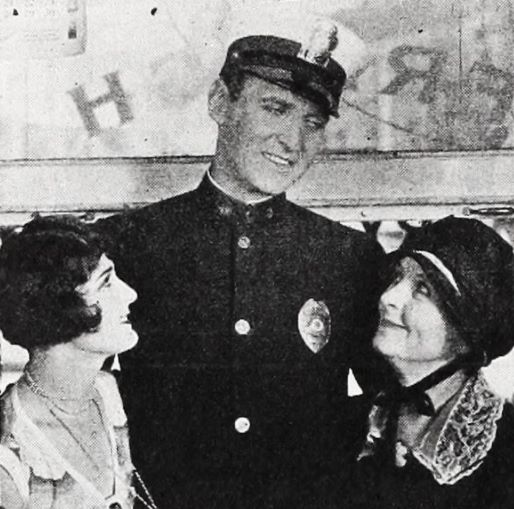
- Still with Ethel Shannon, Maurice Flynn, and Lydia Knott
- Directed by: Harry Garson
- Written by: Gerald Beaumont; Rex Taylor
- Produced by: Harry Garson
- Starring: Maurice 'Lefty' Flynn; Ethel Shannon; Tom Kennedy
- Cinematography: Ernest Haller
- Production company: Robertson-Cole Pictures Corporation
- Distributed by: Film Booking Offices of America
- Release date: June 21, 1925
- Running time: 60 minutes
- Country: United States
- Language: Silent (English intertitles)

High and Handsome is a 1925 American silent drama film directed by Harry Garson and starring Maurice 'Lefty' Flynn, Ethel Shannon, and Tom Kennedy.

== Plot ==
As described in a film magazine reviews, Joe Hanrahan, policeman, rescues Marie Le Doux’s Persian cat from a perch on a telegraph pole and also falls in love with Marie. Battling Kennedy is a prize fighter who also loves Marie and Joe retires in his favor. Joe in the discharge of his duty warns Kennedy’s manager, Tom Burke, against holding any more fights in his arena until the balcony is repaired. He tries to bribe Joe into overlooking this matter and Joe refuses the money. Kennedy slurs Marie and Joe gives him a beating. Word is sent to headquarters that Joe has fought a citizen and his badge is taken from him. When Burke announces that he is looking for someone to fight Kennedy, Joe appears and accepts the challenge. During the fight, in which he whips Kennedy, the balcony falls and several persons are injured. Joe, who has been reinstated, arrests Burke. He also wins the affection of Marie.

== Cast ==
- Maurice 'Lefty' Flynn as Joe Hanrahan
- Ethel Shannon as Marie Ducette
- Tom Kennedy as Bat Kennedy
- Ralph McCullough as Irving Ducette
- Jean Perry as Burke
- Marjorie Bonner as Myrt Riley
- John Gough as Jimmy
- Lydia Knott as Mrs. Hanrahan

== Bibliography ==
- Munden, Kenneth White. The American Film Institute Catalog of Motion Pictures Produced in the United States, Part 1. University of California Press, 1997.
