= Blondes by Choice =

1927 film by Hampton Del Ruth

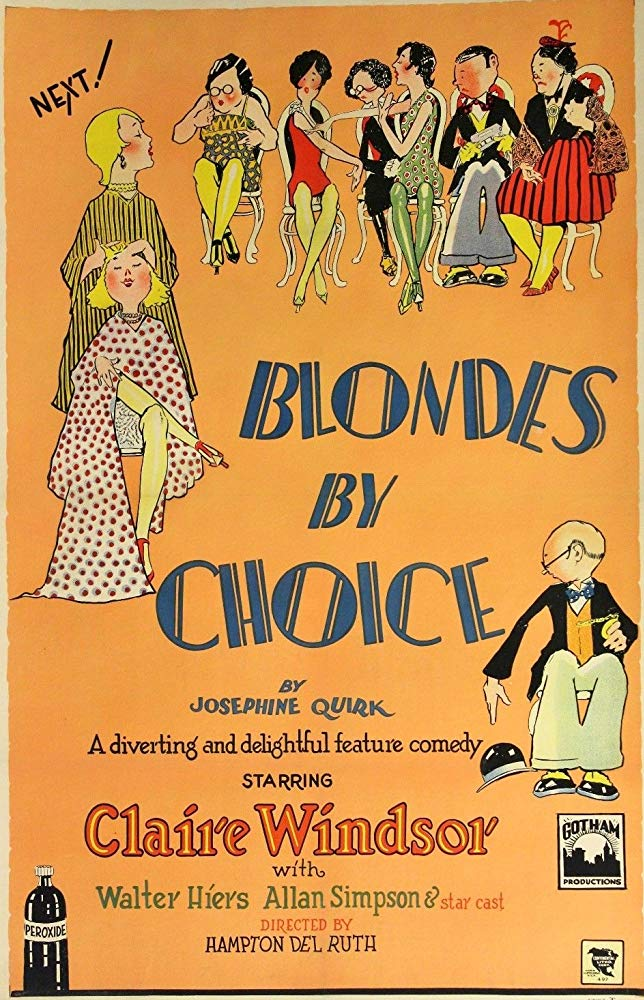
- Directed by: Hampton Del Ruth
- Screenplay by: Josephine Quirk; Paul Perez
- Starring: Claire Windsor
- Cinematography: Ray June
- Edited by: Edith Wakeling
- Production company: Gotham Productions
- Distributed by: Lumas Film Corporation
- Release date: October 1, 1927
- Running time: 70 minutes
- Country: United States
- Language: Silent (English intertitles)

Blondes by Choice is an 1927 American silent comedy film directed by Hampton Del Ruth and starring Claire Windsor. The script was written by Josephine Quirk and Paul Perez. A print of Blondes by Choice exists in the Library of Congress film archive.

== Plot ==
When a man named Cliff's car breaks down, he is towed into the nearest town by a female motorist. It turns out the woman is named Bonnie, and she is the owner of a soon-to-be-opening beauty parlor that has riled up the town.

When she bleaches her hair to stimulate business, a local women's group comes to protest, but she orders them out. But then Cliff's wealthy mother brings Bonnie to a yacht party as her guest of honor, and the local women change their tune and decide to patronize her business; soon she pays off her mortgage and is proposed to by Cliff.

== Starring ==
- Claire Windsor as Bonnie Clinton
- Allan Simpson as Cliff Bennett
- Walter Hiers as Horace Rush
- Bodil Rosing as Caroline Bennett
- Bess Flowers as Olga Flint
- Lee Willard as Benjamin Flint
- Mai Wells as Miss Terwilliger

== Release ==
The film was well received by critics; The Casper Star-Tribune, for example, called it a "fast-moving and amusing affair," noting its expert direction. A reviewer for The Hartford Courant lauded it for its "genuinely hilarious" humor, "high-caliber" cast, and snappy pace.
