= Private Affairs (1925 film) =

1925 film

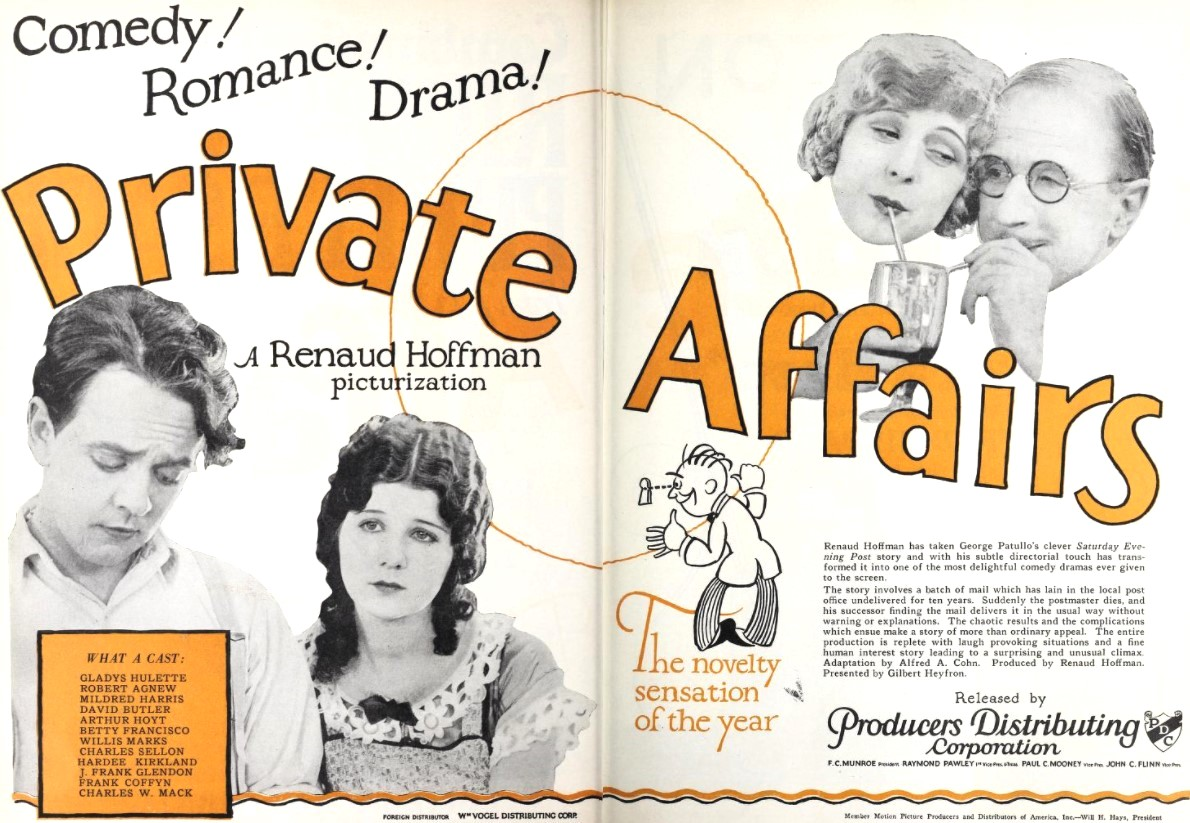
- Advertisement
- Directed by: Renaud Hoffman
- Written by: Alfred A. Cohn
- Based on: "The Ledger of Life" by George Pattullo
- Produced by: Renaud Hoffman; Gilbert Heyfron
- Starring: Gladys Hulette; Mildred Harris; Robert Agnew
- Cinematography: Jack MacKenzie
- Distributed by: Producers Distributing Corporation
- Release date: April 20, 1925
- Running time: 60 minutes
- Country: United States
- Language: Silent (English intertitles)

Private Affairs is a 1925 American silent drama film directed by Renaud Hoffman with Gladys Hulette, Robert Agnew, and Mildred Harris. The plot was based on a 1922 short story "The Ledger of Life" by George Patullo.

== Plot ==
As described in a film magazine review, Agnes Bomar, daughter of the postmaster of a small town, is admired by Fred Henley, who is bent upon a get-rich scheme. Amy Lufkin is admired by Lee Cross, who goes to work in the oil fields to increase his wealth. The postmaster dies and Agnes retains her position under her father's successor. Fred continues to plan to get rich overnight. Five years pass, and a packet of old letters is found at the post office. One letter tells Amy that Lee wishes her to return to him and marry him. However, Amy is now married to a young merchandiser. However, she now plans to leave her husband and their two babies and go to Lee. Another letter, five years old, tells Andy Gillespie that he has inherited a fortune. There are letters for everyone in town, adding to the turmoil. Into this state rides Lee in loud clothes and a rented automobile. His appearance is so shocking that Amy gives up all thought of returning to him, and presses her children to her bosom. Lee goes to the post office, finds Agnes, and is forcing his attentions on her when Fred appears. A fist fight ensues, and Lee, the loser, retreats in his rented car. Lee is offered a position on the condition that he take Agnes with it, and they both agree.

== Cast ==
- Gladys Hulette as Agnes Bomar
- Robert Agnew as Fred Henley
- Mildred Harris as Amy Lufkin
- David Butler as Lee Cross
- Arthur Hoyt as Alf Stacy
- Betty Francisco as Irma Stacy
- Willis Marks as Howard Bomar
- Charles Sellon as Joe Hines
- Hardee Kirkland as Andy Gillespie
- J. Frank Glendon as John Maddox
- Frank Coffyn as Ben Morse
- Charles W. Mack

== Preservation ==
With no prints of Private Affairs located in any film archives, it is a lost film.
