= The Texas Trail =

1925 film

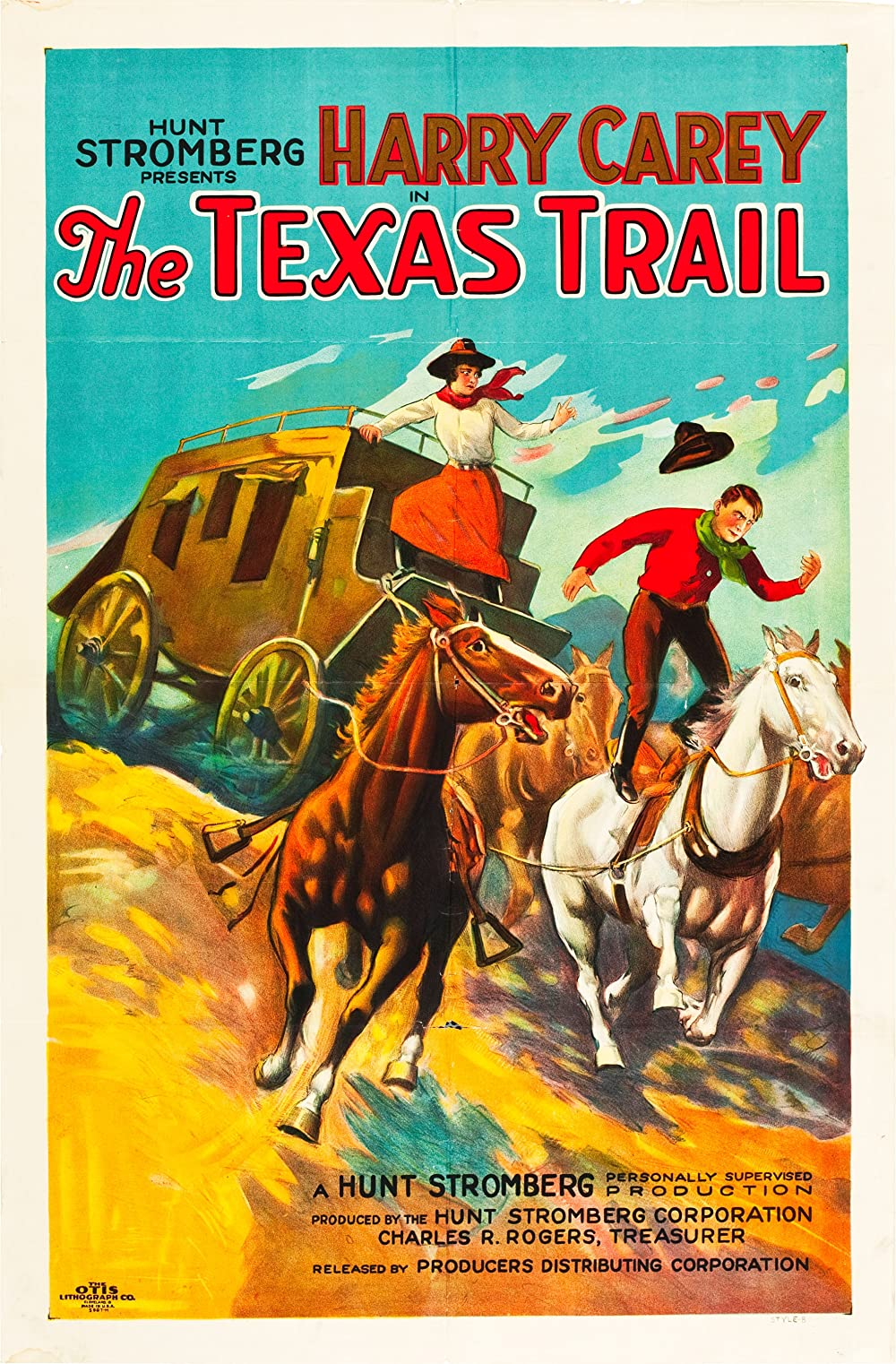
- Film poster
- Directed by: Scott R. Dunlap
- Based on: Rangy Pete by Guy Morton
- Produced by: Hunt Stromberg
- Starring: Harry Carey
- Cinematography: Georges Benoît
- Distributed by: Producers Distributing Corporation
- Release date: June 1, 1925
- Running time: 50 minutes
- Country: United States
- Language: Silent (English intertitles)

The Texas Trail is a lost 1925 American silent Western film directed by Scott R. Dunlap and featuring Harry Carey.

== Plot ==
As described in a film magazine reviews, when Betty Foster comes West, she finds that real cowboys are not a match to what movies have shown her. She has seen them through rose colored glasses. When a robbery occurs, a cowboy fails to protect her. She then disguises herself in a highwayman's clothing and recovers the loot. After she is captured by the bandits, her faith in the West is restored when cowboy Pete Grainger rescues her.

== Cast ==
- Harry Carey as Pete Grainger
- Ethel Shannon as Betty Foster
- Charles K. French as Ring 'Em Foster
- Claude Payton as Dan Merrill
- Sidney Franklin as Ike Collander

== Preservation ==
With no holdings located in archives, The Texas Trail is considered a lost film.

== See also ==
- Harry Carey filmography
