= Bluff (1924 film) =

1924 film by Sam Wood

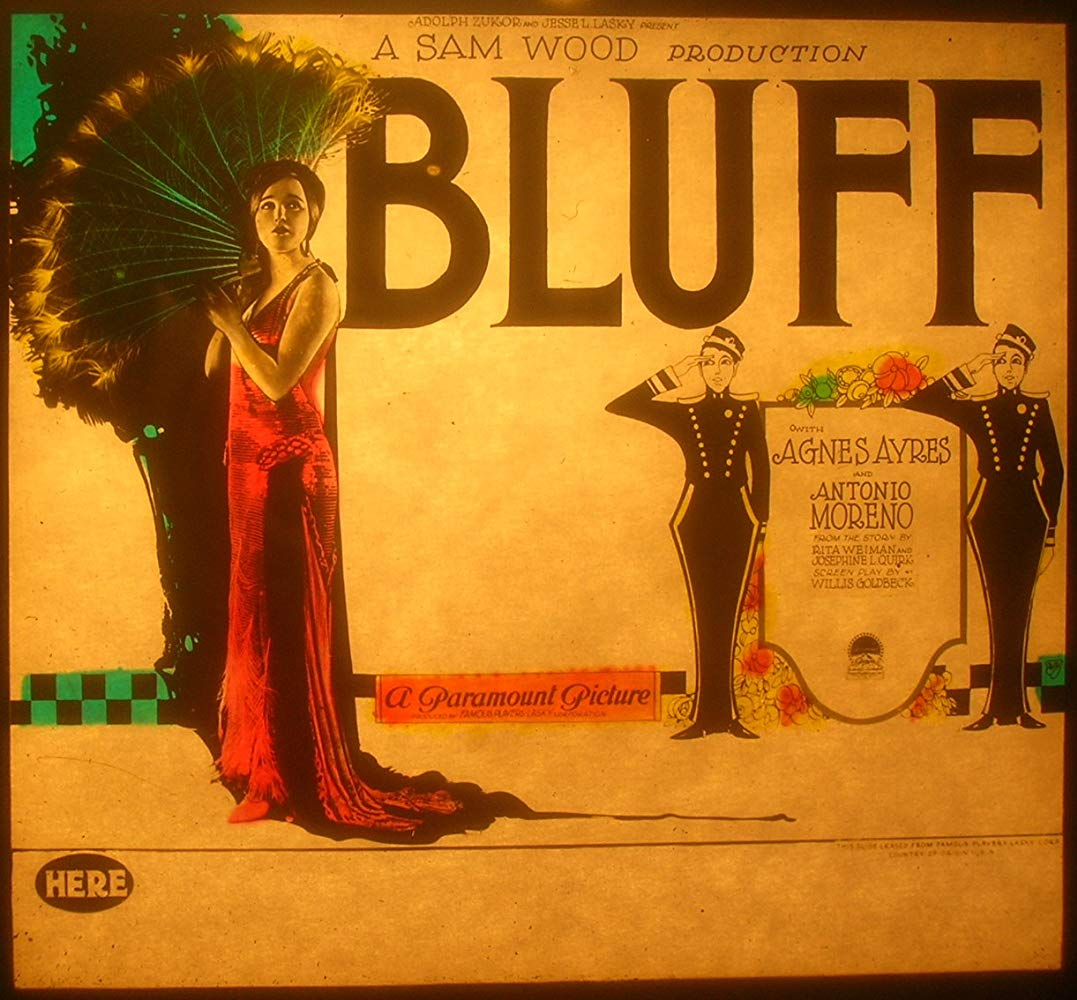
- Lantern slide
- Directed by: Sam Wood
- Screenplay by: Willis Goldbeck; Josephine Quirk; Rita Weiman
- Produced by: Jesse L. Lasky; Adolph Zukor
- Starring: Agnes Ayres; Antonio Moreno; Fred J. Butler; Clarence Burton; Pauline Paquette; Jack Gardner
- Cinematography: Alfred Gilks
- Production company: Famous Players–Lasky Corporation
- Distributed by: Paramount Pictures
- Release date: May 12, 1924
- Running time: 60 minutes
- Country: United States
- Language: Silent (English intertitles)

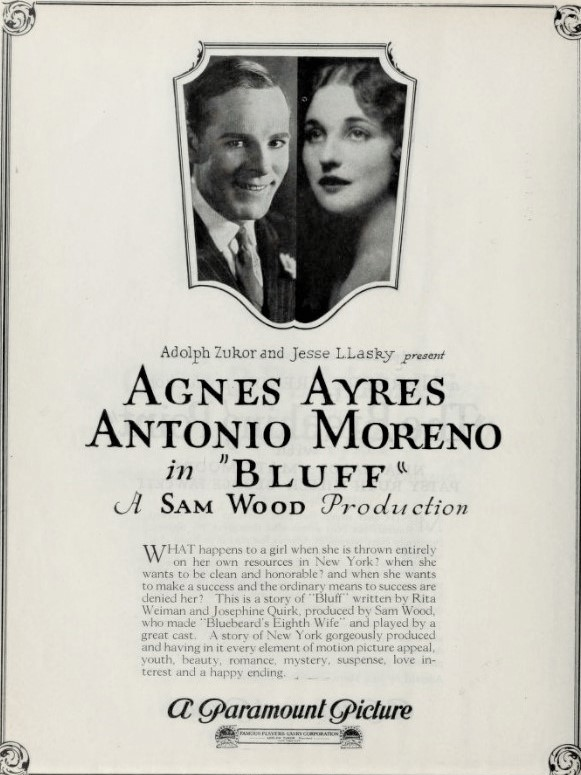
Bluff, 1924

Bluff is a 1924 American silent drama film directed by Sam Wood and written by Willis Goldbeck, Josephine Quirk, and Rita Weiman. The film stars Agnes Ayres, Antonio Moreno, Fred J. Butler, Clarence Burton, Pauline Paquette, and Jack Gardner. The film was released on May 12, 1924, by Paramount Pictures.

== Plot ==
As described in a film magazine review, Betty Hallowell is an unsuccessful fashion designer as the New York City modistes spurn her work as being that of a nobody. Her brother Jack is crippled in an accident involving political boss Mitchell's automobile. The latter swears vengeance on Betty when she refuses the slim compromise he offers. Broke, Betty realizes that you must bluff in order to win prestige in Gotham, so she impersonates Nina Loring, a missing international beauty, and the New York City modistes flock to buy her designs. However, the real Nina is wanted for embezzlement. Mitchell's secretary is about to have Betty arrested. She is saved by Robert Fitzmaurice, a young lawyer, who threatens to expose Mitchell's crookedness and, by bluffing, causes him to back down. As a result, Robert wins Betty's affection.

== Cast ==
- Agnes Ayres as Betty Hallowell
- Antonio Moreno as Robert Fitzmaurice
- Fred J. Butler as Boss Mitchell
- Clarence Burton as Jack Hallowell
- Pauline Paquette as Fifine
- Jack Gardner as Dr. Steve Curtiss
- Arthur Hoyt as Algy Henderson
- E. H. Calvert as Norbert Conroy
- Roscoe Karns as Jack Hallowell

== Preservation ==
The film has survived and is preserved in a nitrate print in the Library of Congress collection and another print is listed as being held by UCLA Film & Television Archive.
