= The Unknown Soldier (1926 film) =

1926 film by Renaud Hoffman

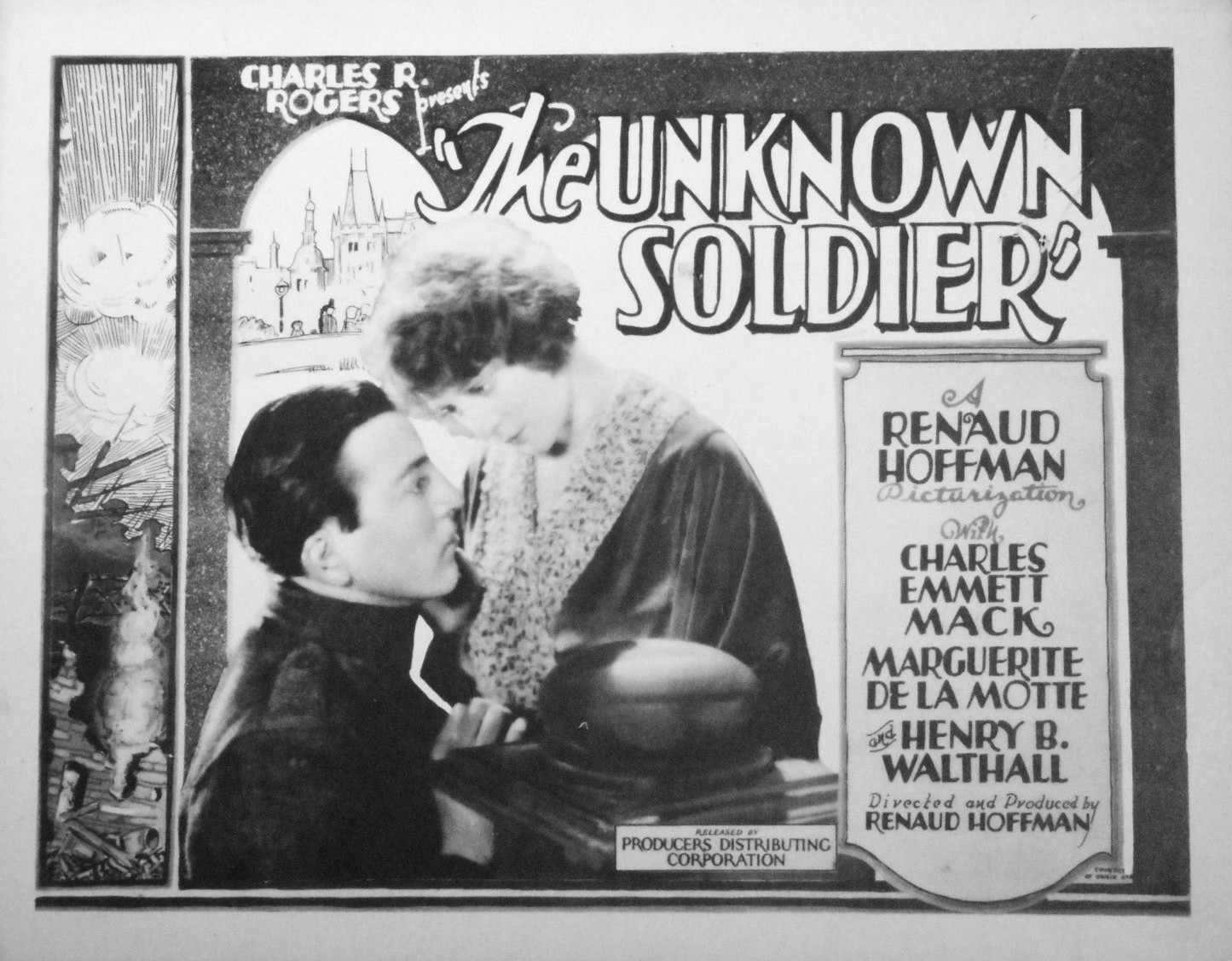
- Lobby card
- Directed by: Renaud Hoffman
- Screenplay by: Richard Schayer; James J. Tynan
- Produced by: Renaud Hoffman
- Starring: Charles Emmett Mack; Marguerite De La Motte; Henry B. Walthall; Claire McDowell; George Cooper
- Cinematography: Ray June
- Production companies: Charles R. Rogers Productions; Renaud Hoffman Productions
- Distributed by: Producers Distributing Corporation
- Release date: May 30, 1926
- Running time: 71 minutes
- Country: United States
- Language: Silent (English intertitles)

The Unknown Soldier is a 1926 American silent drama film directed by Renaud Hoffman, written by Richard Schayer and James J. Tynan, and starring Charles Emmett Mack, Marguerite De La Motte, Henry B. Walthall, Claire McDowell, and George Cooper. It was released on May 30, 1926, by Producers Distributing Corporation.

== Plot ==
The plot involves an American soldier heroically dying alone during World War I with a faint suggestion that he may be interred in the Tomb of the Unknown Soldier, which had been dedicated in 1921.

== Cast ==
- Charles Emmett Mack as Fred Williams
- Marguerite De La Motte as Mary Phillips
- Henry B. Walthall as John Phillips
- Claire McDowell as John Phillips's sister
- George Cooper as Cpl. Fogarty
- Syd Crossley as Peaceful Perkins
- Jesse De Vorska as Mike
- Willis Marks as Rev. Dr. Mortimer
- Ethel Wales as Mrs. Williams

== Reception ==
The film was shown at a Los Angeles theater with a happy ending where De La Motte's character Mary stood at an altar for a mythical marriage and at the end her soldier Fred appears. A second version was later shown where the soldier never returns, leaving the young woman standing alone in a fade out, which patrons of the theater preferred. Director Renaud Hoffman stated that the later version was what he intended, and wanted it shown that way nationwide.

== Preservation ==
Prints of The Unknown Soldier survive in the Library of Congress, UCLA Film & Television Archive, and in a foreign archive.
