= Empty Hearts =

1924 film

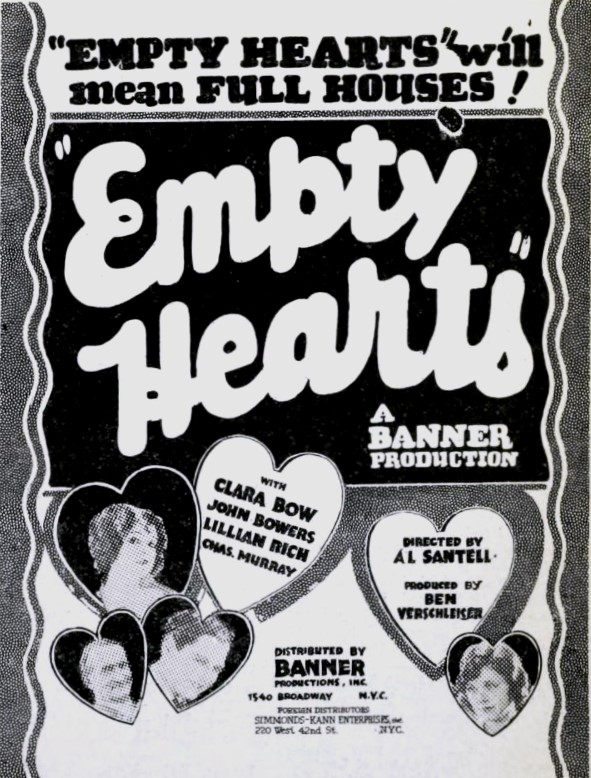
- Advertisement
- Directed by: Alfred Santell
- Written by: Adele Buffington (scenario)
- Story by: Evelyn Campbell
- Produced by: Ben Verschleiser
- Starring: John Bowers; Charles Murray; John Miljan; Clara Bow
- Cinematography: Ernest Haller
- Production company: Banner Productions
- Distributed by: Henry Ginsberg Distributing Company
- Release date: September 15, 1924 (U.S.)
- Running time: 6 reels
- Country: United States
- Language: Silent (English intertitles)

Empty Hearts is a 1924 American silent drama film directed by Alfred Santell. Adele Buffington wrote the scenario based on Evelyn Campbell's story published in Metropolitan.

== Plot ==
Milt Kimberlin marries a cabaret dancer who dies after he loses his money. Years later, he regains his fortune and remarries, but he is distant and misses his first wife. His new wife leaves him after a blackmailer's letter arrives suggesting infidelity in his first marriage, but eventually the truth is revealed and their relationship grows stronger.

== Cast ==
- John Bowers as Milt Kimberlin
- Charles Murray as Joe Delane
- John Miljan as Frank Gorman
- Clara Bow as Rosalie
- Buck Black as Val Kimberlin
- Lillian Rich as Madeline
- Joan Standing as Hilda, the maid

== Preservation ==
An incomplete print of Empty Hearts is held by the UCLA Film & Television Archive.
