= The High Flyer =

1926 film

- Directed by: Harry Joe Brown
- Based on: The Bird Man by J. Frank Clark
- Produced by: Harry Joe Brown
- Starring: Reed Howes; Ethel Shannon; Paul Panzer
- Production company: Harry J. Brown Productions
- Distributed by: Rayart Pictures
- Release date: September 30, 1926
- Running time: 50 minutes
- Country: United States
- Languages: Silent; English intertitles

The High Flyer is a 1926 American silent action film directed by Harry Joe Brown and starring Reed Howes, Ethel Shannon and Paul Panzer. It was distributed by the independent Rayart Pictures, the forerunner of Monogram Pictures.

== Synopsis ==
Jim, a World War I veteran and airplane designer has his plans for a new model stolen by his associate Dick, who wants to sell them to a wealthy manufacturer while wooing his daughter Winnie.

== Cast ==
- Reed Howes as Jim
- Ethel Shannon as Winnie
- James Bradbury Sr. as Dick
- Ray Hallor as Tom
- Paul Panzer as McGrew
- Josef Swickard
- Cissy Fitzgerald
- Ernest Hilliard
- Earl Metcalfe
- Joseph W. Girard

== Bibliography ==
- Munden, Kenneth White. The American Film Institute Catalog of Motion Pictures Produced in the United States, Part 1. University of California Press, 1997.
