= Danger Quest =

1926 film directed by Harry Joe Brown

- Directed by: Harry Joe Brown
- Written by: Henry Roberts Symonds
- Produced by: Harry Joe Brown
- Starring: Reed Howes; Ethel Shannon; J.P. McGowan
- Production company: Harry J. Brown Productions
- Distributed by: Rayart Pictures
- Release date: January 9, 1926
- Running time: 50 minutes
- Country: United States
- Languages: Silent; English intertitles

Danger Quest is a 1926 American silent action film directed by Harry Joe Brown and starring Reed Howes, Ethel Shannon and J.P. McGowan.

== Cast ==
- Reed Howes as Rob Rollins
- Ethel Shannon as Nan Colby
- J.P. McGowan as Col. Spiffy
- David Kirby as Spatz Barrett
- Billy Franey as Rolf Royce
- Fred Kohler as Otto Shugars
- George Reed as Umhatten
- Rodney Keyes as Inspector

== Bibliography ==
- Munden, Kenneth White. The American Film Institute Catalog of Motion Pictures Produced in the United States, Part 1. University of California Press, 1997.
