= The Sign of the Claw =

1926 film

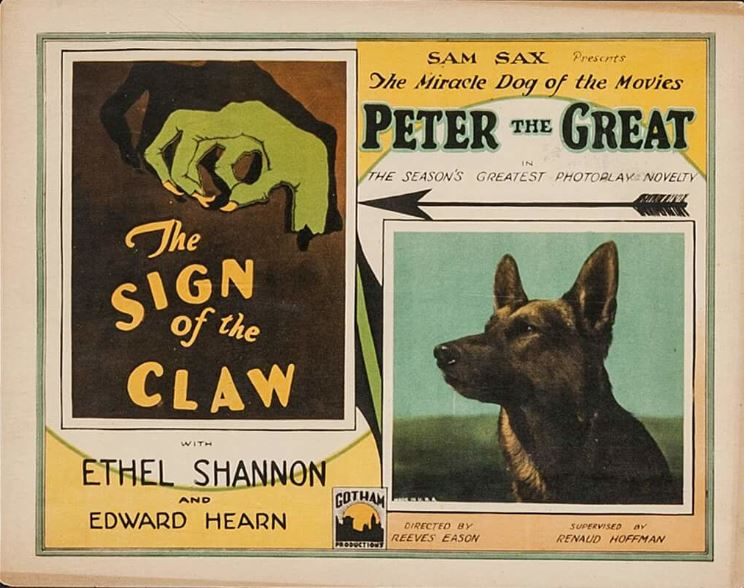
- Directed by: B. Reeves Eason
- Written by: James Bell Smith; L. A. Young
- Produced by: Renaud Hoffman; Samuel Sax
- Starring: Ethel Shannon; Edward Hearn; Lee Shumway
- Cinematography: Ray June
- Production company: Gotham Pictures
- Distributed by: Lumas Film Corporation; Stoll Pictures (UK)
- Release date: May 1926
- Running time: 60 minutes
- Country: United States
- Languages: Silent; English intertitles

The Sign of the Claw is a 1926 American silent action film directed by B. Reeves Eason and starring Ethel Shannon, Edward Hearn and Lee Shumway. Produced by the independent Gotham Pictures, it was designed as a vehicle for Peter the Great, one of several dog stars to appear in films during the 1920s.

== Cast ==
- Peter the Great as Peter
- Ethel Shannon as Mildred Bryson
- Edward Hearn as Robert Conway
- Lee Shumway as Al Stokes
- Joseph Bennett a Jimmie Bryson
- Carmencita Johnson as Little Girl

== Bibliography ==
- Connelly, Robert B. The Silents: Silent Feature Films, 1910-36, Volume 40, Issue 2. December Press, 1998.
- Munden, Kenneth White. The American Film Institute Catalog of Motion Pictures Produced in the United States, Part 1. University of California Press, 1997.
