= Through Thick and Thin =

Through Thick and Thin may refer to:

- Through Thick and Thin (album), a 1997 album by Dogwood
- Through Thick and Thin (film), a 1927 American silent crime film
