= Sunshine of Paradise Alley =

1926 film directed by Jack Nelson

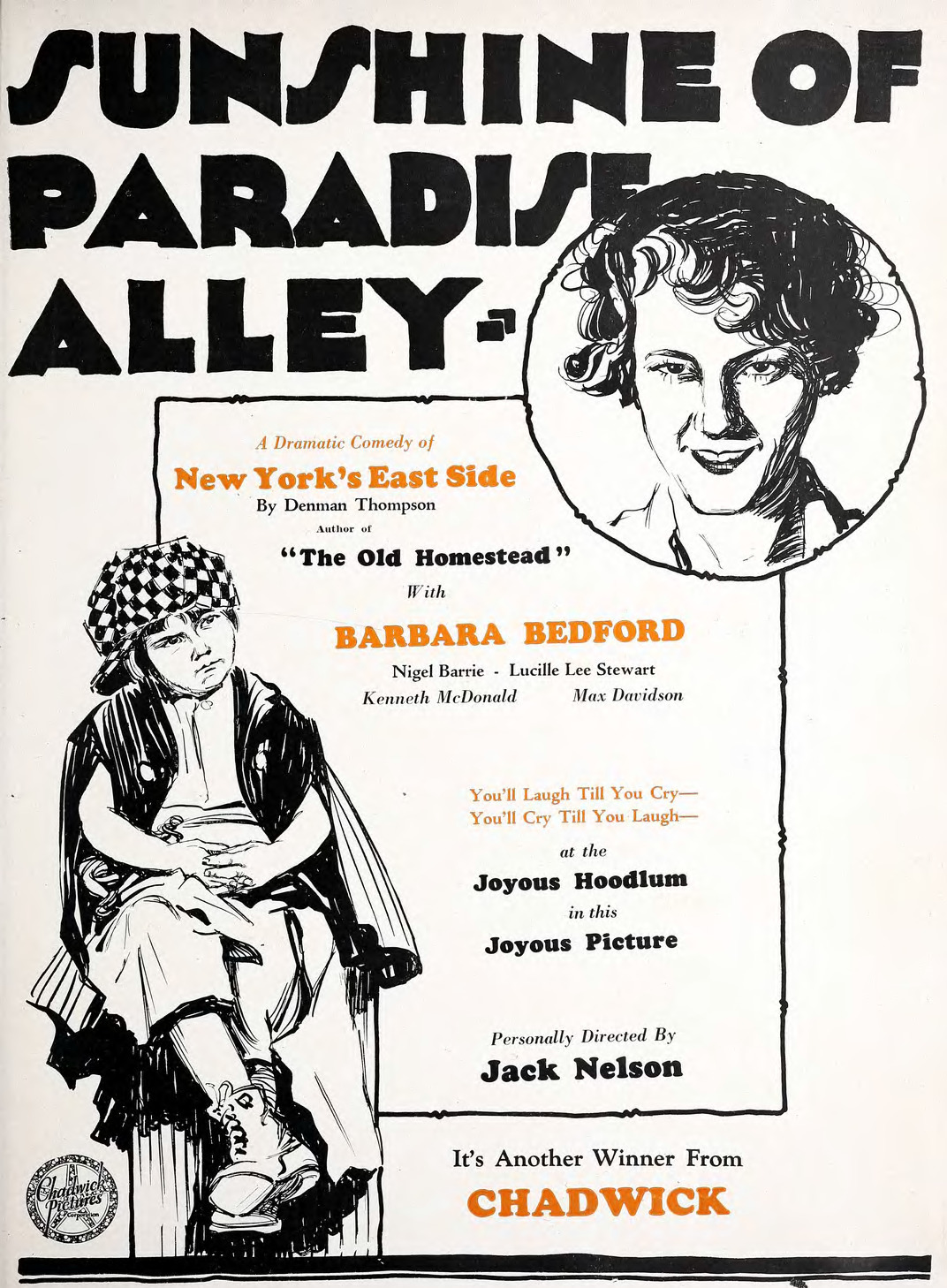
- 1927 advertisement
- Directed by: Jack Nelson
- Written by: Josephine Quirk; George W. Ryer (play); Denman Thompson (play); Rick Todd
- Produced by: Jesse J. Goldburg; I.E. Chadwick
- Starring: Barbara Bedford; Kenneth MacDonald; Max Davidson
- Cinematography: Ernest Miller; Ted Tetzlaff
- Production company: Chadwick Pictures
- Distributed by: Chadwick Pictures; Butcher's Film Service (UK)
- Release date: December 15, 1926
- Running time: 7 reels
- Country: United States
- Languages: Silent; English intertitles

Sunshine of Paradise Alley is a 1926 American silent drama film directed by Jack Nelson and starring Barbara Bedford, Kenneth MacDonald, and Max Davidson.

== Cast ==
- Barbara Bedford as Sunshine O'Day
- Kenneth MacDonald as Jerry Sullivan
- Max Davidson as Solomon Levy
- Nigel Barrie as Stanley Douglas
- Gayne Whitman as Glen Wathershoon
- Lucille Lee Stewart as Gladys Waldroon
- Tui Bow as Queenie May
- J. Parks Jones as Chet Hawkins
- Bobby Nelson as Bum
- Frank Weed as Daddy O'Day
- Max Asher
- Evelyn Sherman
- Leon Holmes
- Monty O'Grady as Little Boy
- Helene Pirie as Aggie

== Preservation ==
Prints of Sunshine of Paradise Alley are in the collections of the Library of Congress, Archives Du Film Du CNC (Bois d'Arcy), BFI National Archive, and Lobster Films (Paris).

== Bibliography ==
- Donald W. McCaffrey & Christopher P. Jacobs. Guide to the Silent Years of American Cinema. Greenwood Publishing, 1999. ISBN 0-313-30345-2
