= The Phantom Express (1925 film) =

1925 film

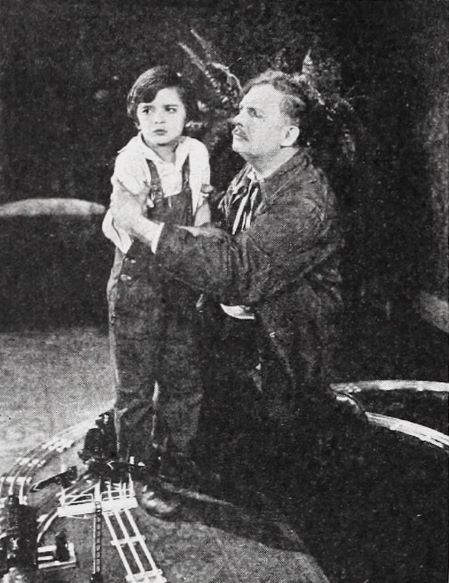
- Still with Frankie Darro and George Periolat
- Directed by: John G. Adolfi
- Written by: Tom J. Hopkins
- Starring: Ethel Shannon; David Butler; Frankie Darro
- Cinematography: Charles J. Davis; Conrad Wells
- Production company: Banner Productions
- Distributed by: Henry Ginsberg Distributing Company; Wardour Films (UK)
- Release date: November 1925
- Running time: 50 minutes
- Country: United States
- Language: Silent (English intertitles)

The Phantom Express is a 1925 American silent action crime film directed by John G. Adolfi and starring Ethel Shannon, David Butler, and Frankie Darro.

== Plot ==
As described in a film magazine review, a young railroad engineer, who is in love with the daughter of another engineer, takes the throttle of his company’s fastest train after his sweetheart’s father becomes demented over a wreck. The young man drives the train without mishap for a while and then almost has a wreck. However, the near wrecking of the train reveals the man who caused the wreck and nearly ruined the young man’s happiness.

== Cast ==
- Ethel Shannon as Nora Lane
- David Butler as Jack Warren
- Frankie Darro as 'Daddles' Lane - Nora's Brother
- George Periolat as John Lane - Nora's Father
- George Siegmann as Rufus Hardy
- William H. Tooker as George Mott
- John Webb Dillion as Henry Muncy

== Bibliography ==
- Munden, Kenneth White. The American Film Institute Catalog of Motion Pictures Produced in the United States, Part 1. University of California Press, 1997.
