= The Legend of Hollywood =

1924 silent film

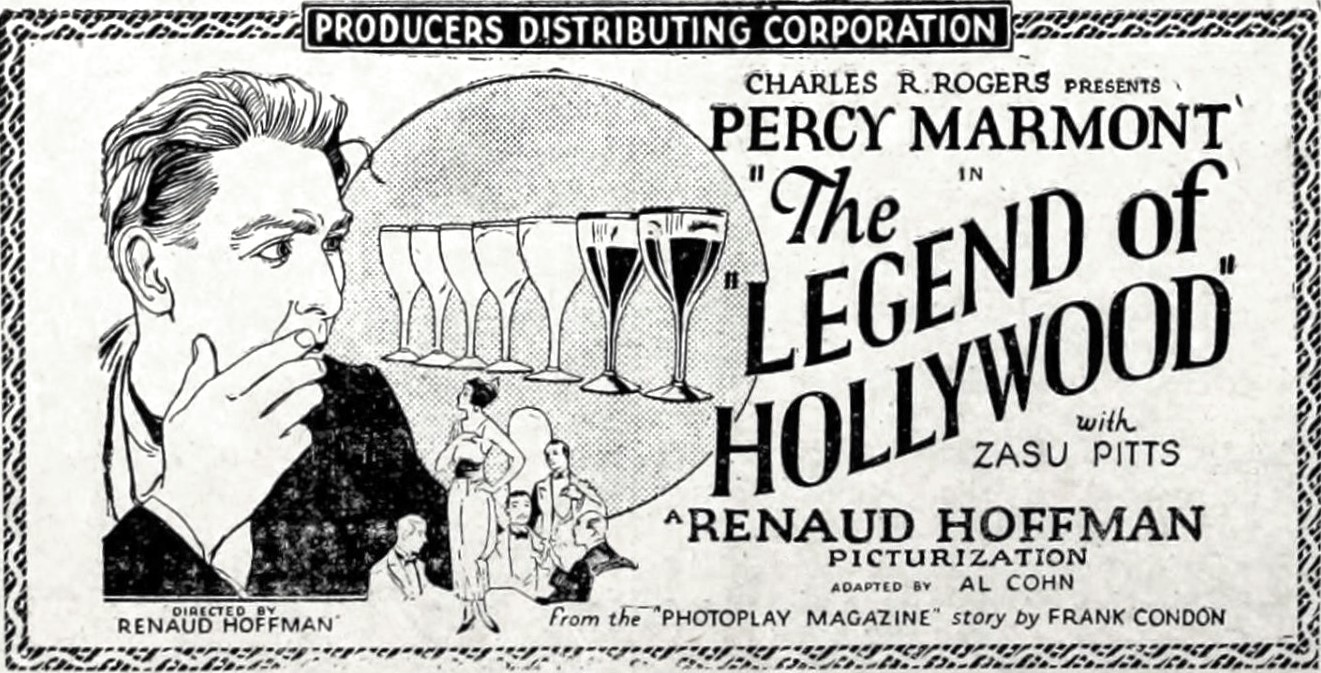
- Advertisement
- Directed by: Renaud Hoffman
- Written by: Alfred A. Cohn
- Story by: Frank Condon
- Produced by: Charles R. Rogers
- Starring: Percy Marmont; ZaSu Pitts; Alice Davenport
- Cinematography: Karl Struss
- Edited by: Glen Wheeler
- Production company: Charles R. Rogers Productions
- Distributed by: Producers Distributing Corporation
- Release date: August 3, 1924
- Running time: 60 minutes
- Country: United States
- Language: Silent (English intertitles)

The Legend of Hollywood is a 1924 American silent romantic drama film directed by Renaud Hoffman and starring Percy Marmont, ZaSu Pitts, and Alice Davenport.

== Plot ==
As described in a review in a film magazine, a boarding house in Hollywood shelters a variety of persons who are seeking success in the movies. Among them is John Smith (Marmont) who is writing what he hopes will be the screen's greatest story. Filled with enthusiasm, he visits the studios but without result. The landlady tells him his rent is overdue, but allows him to stay in the room for seven more days if he does not take meals. He determines to end it all by taking poison, but notices the room has seven glasses, so he gambles with death by filling the glasses with wine and one with poison, and drinking one each days. The first six days of despair is nothing to the seventh day when, with the final glass remaining, there is no longer any element of chance. He drinks the last glass just as a friend walks in, bringing a letter saying the story has been accepted. Mary Brown (Pitts), the young woman who cleans his room and is his friend comes by and finds John apparently dead. Then he opens his eyes and she explains that one day she accidentally knocked a glass of wine off the mantel, and to hide it got a replacement glass of wine. She was just about to leave for home, but he persuades her to stay and share in his success.

== Cast ==
- Percy Marmont as John Smith
- ZaSu Pitts as Mary Brown
- Alice Davenport as Mrs. Rooney
- Dorothy Dorr as Blondie

== Bibliography ==
- Munden, Kenneth White. The American Film Institute Catalog of Motion Pictures Produced in the United States, Part 1. University of California Press, 1997.
