= Lovebound =

1923 film directed by Henry Otto

- Directed by: Henry Otto
- Screenplay by: Josephine Quirk; Jules Furthman
- Story by: George Scarborough
- Starring: Shirley Mason; Alan Roscoe; Richard Tucker; Joseph W. Girard; Edward Martindel; Fred Kelsey
- Cinematography: David Abel
- Production company: Fox Film Corporation
- Distributed by: Fox Film Corporation
- Release date: April 15, 1923
- Running time: 50 minutes
- Country: United States
- Language: English

Lovebound is a 1923 American drama film directed by Henry Otto and written by Josephine Quirk and Jules Furthman. The film stars Shirley Mason, Alan Roscoe, Richard Tucker, Joseph W. Girard, Edward Martindel and Fred Kelsey. The film was released on April 15, 1923, by Fox Film Corporation.

== Cast ==
- Shirley Mason as Bess Belwyn
- Alan Roscoe as John Mobley
- Richard Tucker as Paul Meredith
- Joseph W. Girard as David Belwyn
- Edward Martindel as Stephen Barker
- Fred Kelsey as Detective Hahn

== Preservation ==
With no prints of Lovebound located in any film archives, it is considered a lost film.
