= Call of the Circus =

1930 film

- Directed by: Frank O'Connor
- Screenplay by: Maxine Alton
- Produced by: C.C. Burr
- Starring: Francis X. Bushman; Ethel Clayton
- Cinematography: Lewis W. Physioc
- Production company: Pickwick Pictures
- Distributed by: Hollywood Pictures
- Release date: January 15, 1930 (U.S.)
- Running time: 69 minutes

Call of the Circus is a 1930 pre-Code film written by Maxine Alton and directed by Frank O'Connor. The film stars Francis X. Bushman and Ethel Clayton. The film is noted as silent screen idol Bushman's first talkie.

== Plot ==
A retired clown tells a young woman about his life under the big top and his troubles with his wife. He falls for the young girl after rescuing her from peril, but she falls in love with a young man. Eventually he realizes his love for his wife and son, and the three return to the circus.

== Starring ==
- Francis X. Bushman as The Man
- Ethel Clayton as The Woman
- Joan Wyndham as The Girl
- William C. Kirby as The Boy
- Dorothy Gay as Circus Performer
- Sunburnt Jim Wilson as The Shadow

== Production ==
Bushman signed a contract with Pickwick Pictures in July 1929. After the film's release, Bushman sued O'Connor and his production company for back wages, and won a full judgment of $2,500.
