= The Cowboy and the Countess =

1926 film

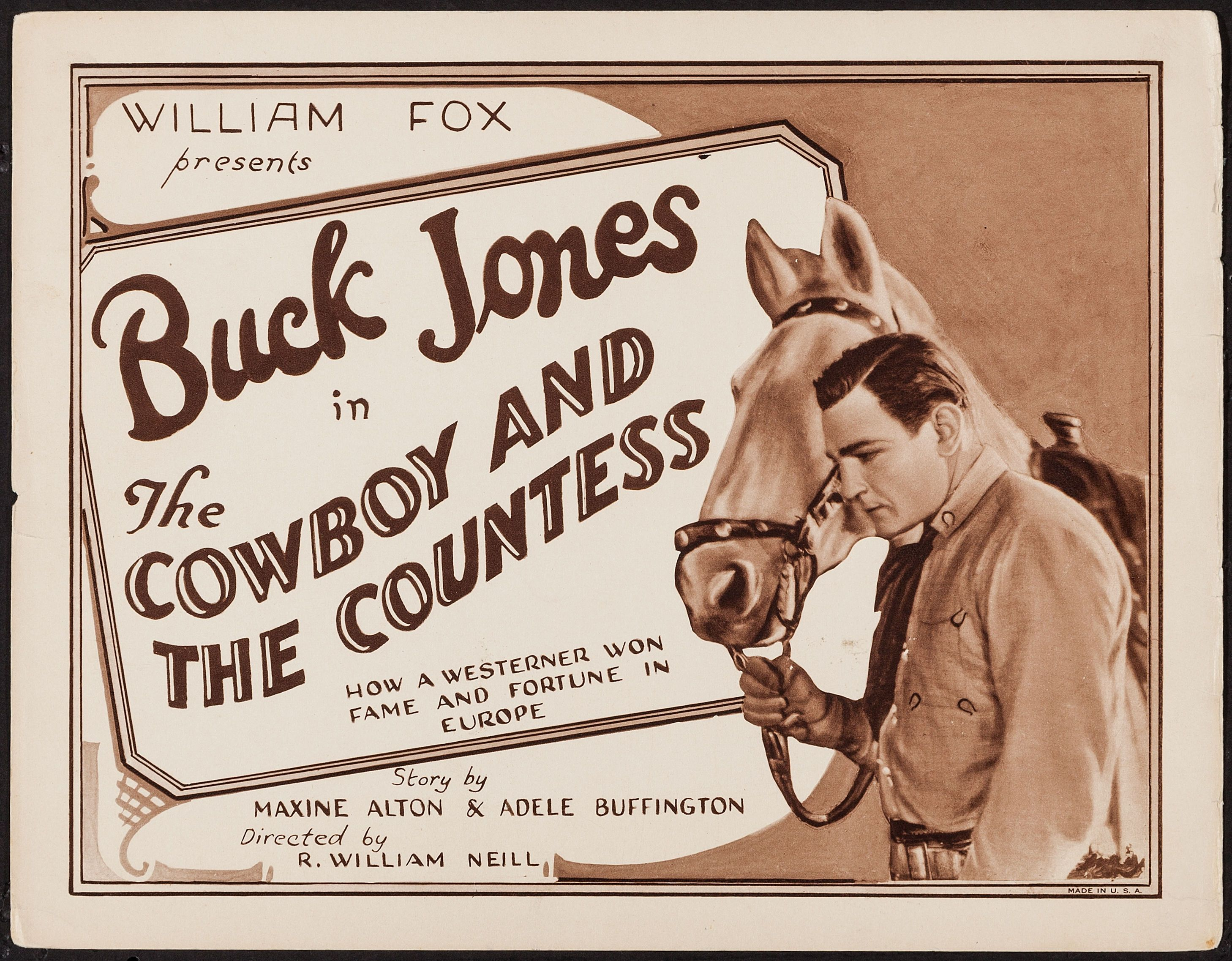
- Lobby card
- Directed by: Roy William Neill
- Written by: Maxine Alton; Adele Buffington; Charles Darnton
- Produced by: William Fox
- Starring: Buck Jones; Helena D'Algy; Diana Miller
- Cinematography: Reginald Lyons
- Production company: Fox Film
- Distributed by: Fox Film
- Release date: January 31, 1926
- Running time: 60 minutes
- Country: United States
- Language: Silent (English intertitles)

The Cowboy and the Countess is a 1926 American silent Western film directed by Roy William Neill and starring Buck Jones, Helena D'Algy, and Diana Miller.

== Plot ==
As described in a film magazine review, Jerry Whipple, daredevil of the Western range, rescues the Countess Justina and her party when their car is wrecked in a storm. Jerry falls in love with the Countess. Later, he tours Europe with his cowboy pals as part of a wild west show. The Duke de Milos has loaned Countess' father money on the condition that the daughter would become his bride. Jerry puts on a wild west show in the palace court and later kidnaps the Countess whom he later weds.

== Cast ==
- Buck Jones as Jerry Whipple
- Helena D'Algy as Countess Justina
- Diana Miller as Nanette
- Harvey Clark as Edwin Irving Mansfield
- Monte Collins as Slim
- Fletcher Norton as Duke de Milos
- Chappell Dossett as Alexis Verlaine
- Jere Austin as Bozarri

== Bibliography ==
- Solomon, Aubrey. The Fox Film Corporation, 1915-1935: A History and Filmography. McFarland, 2011.
