= Speed Wild =

1925 film

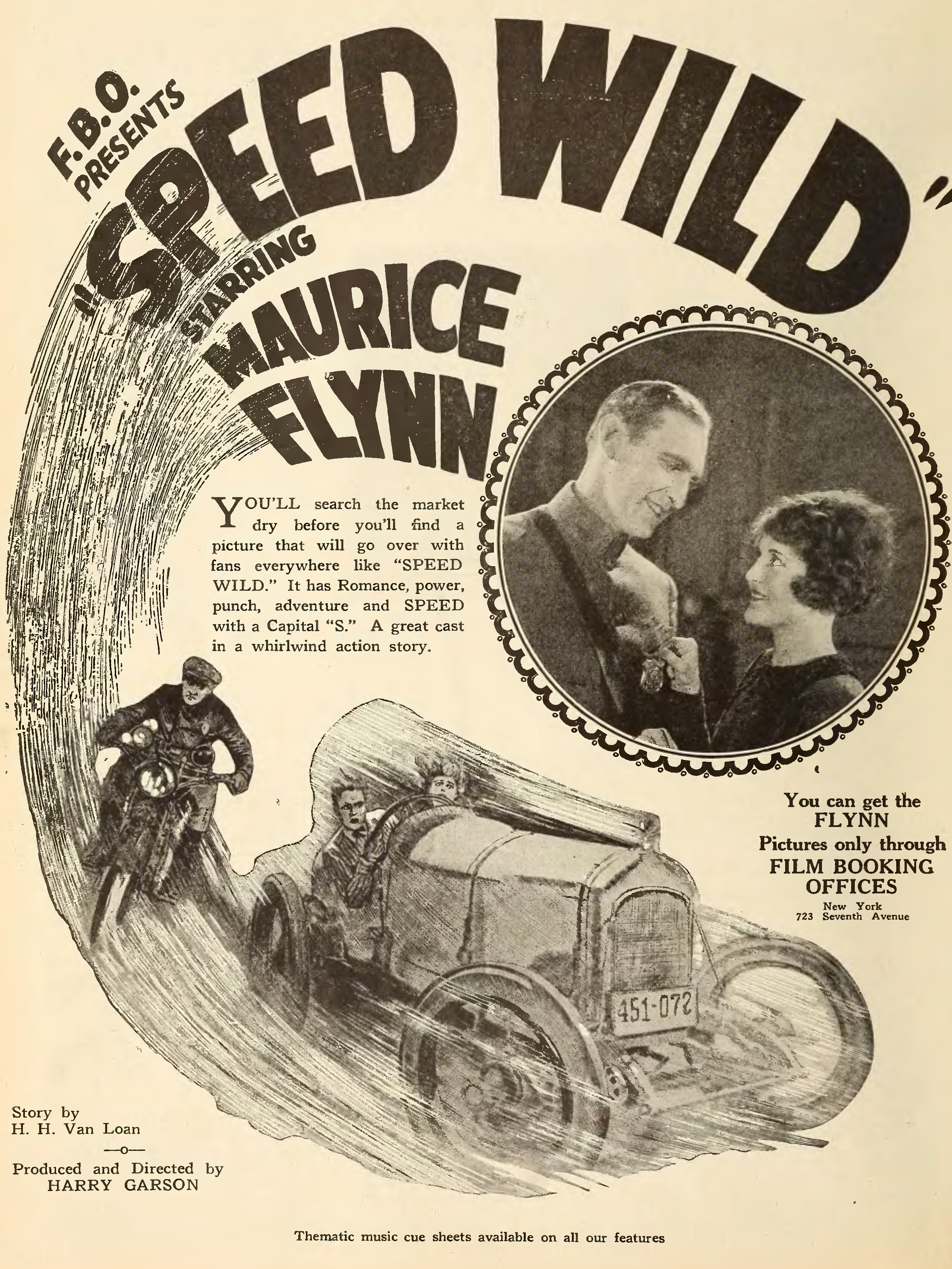
- Advertisement
- Directed by: Harry Garson
- Written by: Frank S. Beresford; H.H. Van Loan
- Produced by: Harry Garson
- Starring: Maurice 'Lefty' Flynn; Ethel Shannon; Frank Elliott
- Cinematography: William H. Tuers
- Production company: Harry Garson Productions
- Distributed by: Film Booking Offices of America
- Release date: May 10, 1925
- Running time: 50 minutes
- Country: United States
- Language: Silent (English intertitles)

Speed Wild is a 1925 American silent action film directed by Harry Garson and starring Maurice 'Lefty' Flynn, Ethel Shannon, and Frank Elliott.

== Plot ==
As described in a film magazine review, Jack Ames joins the police force after getting a reputation for racing, and beating, motorcycle riding coppers. His fiancée, Mary Bryant, is wooed by Wendell Martin, the brains of a gang of smugglers. Mary's brother Charles is also an involuntary member of the gang. When Mary is thrown in front of a train in an automobile crash, Jack rescues her. He then saves her brother from the vengeance of the smugglers. When he follows the gang on his motorcycle, his machine is thrown off a high cliff into the ocean. Martin kidnaps Mary and puts her on his ship. Jack follows and, with the aid of the whole police force, rescues her.

== Cast ==
- Maurice 'Lefty' Flynn as Jack Ames
- Ethel Shannon as Mary Bryant
- Frank Elliott as Wendell Martin
- Ralph McCullough as Charles Bryant
- Ray Turner as Ulysses
- Fred Burns as Red Dugan
- Charles Clary as Herbert Barron
- Billy Butts as Child
- Doreen Turner as Child

== Bibliography ==
- Connelly, Robert B. The Silents: Silent Feature Films, 1910-36, Volume 40, Issue 2. December Press, 1998.
- Munden, Kenneth White. The American Film Institute Catalog of Motion Pictures Produced in the United States, Part 1. University of California Press, 1997.
