= Hearts and Spangles =

1926 film

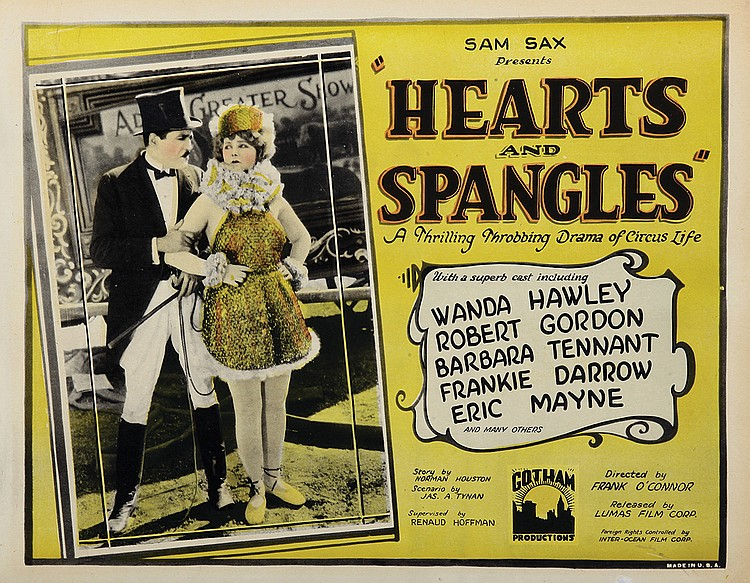
- Directed by: Frank O'Connor
- Written by: Norman Houston; James J. Tynan; Henry McCarty
- Starring: Wanda Hawley; Robert Gordon; Frankie Darro
- Cinematography: Edward Gheller
- Edited by: Leonard Wheeler
- Production company: Gotham Pictures
- Distributed by: Lumas Film Corporation; Stoll Pictures (UK)
- Release date: June 15, 1926
- Running time: 59 minutes
- Country: United States
- Languages: Silent; English intertitles

Hearts and Spangles is a 1926 American silent drama film directed by Frank O'Connor and starring Wanda Hawley, Robert Gordon and Frankie Darro. A medical student is expelled from college and disowned by his father, and goes to join the circus.

== Cast ==
- Wanda Hawley as Peg Palmer
- Robert Gordon as Steve Carris
- Barbara Tennant as Grace Carris
- Eric Mayne as Dr. Carris
- Frankie Darro as Bobby
- Larry Steers as Peter Carris
- J.P. Lockney as Harry Riley
- George Chesebro as Barclay
- Charles Force as Hawkins

== Bibliography ==
- Munden, Kenneth White. The American Film Institute Catalog of Motion Pictures Produced in the United States, Part 1. University of California Press, 1997.
