= Her Mad Bargain =

1921 film

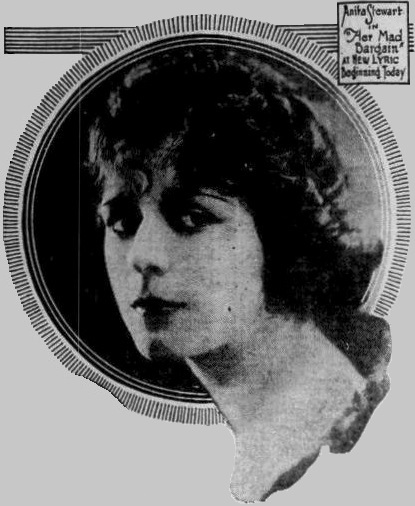
- Newspaper advertisement
- Directed by: Edwin Carewe
- Screenplay by: Josephine Quirk
- Story by: Florence Auer
- Starring: Anita Stewart; Arthur Edmund Carewe; Helen Raymond; Adele Farrington; Margaret McWade; Percy Challenger
- Cinematography: Robert Kurrle
- Production companies: Anita Stewart Productions; Louis B. Mayer Productions
- Distributed by: Associated First National Pictures
- Release date: December 12, 1921
- Running time: 60 minutes
- Country: United States
- Language: Silent (English intertitles)

Her Mad Bargain is a 1921 American drama film directed by Edwin Carewe and written by Josephine Quirk. The film stars Anita Stewart, Arthur Edmund Carewe, Helen Raymond, Adele Farrington, Margaret McWade, and Percy Challenger. The film was released on December 12, 1921, by Associated First National Pictures.

== Plot ==
As described in a film magazine, Alice Lambert, after spending ten years in idleness and luxury, finds herself without funds and must make her way in the world. She becomes a cloak model, but the proprietor of the shop proves to be a despicable character and she leaves when he attempts to embrace her. She next secures work as an artist's model, but flees from the studio half clad when the artist attempts to make violent love to her. She seeks refuge in another studio belonging to artist David Leighton, who prevents her suicide by offering to loan her $50,000. In return, she is to take out a life insurance policy for $75,000 for one year. At the end of the year, of course, she is supposed to die and David would be ahead by $25,000. This scheme results in several incidents and a happy ending.

== Cast ==
- Anita Stewart as Alice Lambert
- Arthur Edmund Carewe as Grant Lewis
- Helen Raymond as Mrs. Henry Beresford
- Adele Farrington as Mrs. Gordon Howe
- Margaret McWade as Mrs. Dunn
- Percy Challenger as Parsons
- Walter McGrail as David Leighton
- Gertrude Astor as Ruth Beresford
- George B. Williams as Monsieur Armand
- Ernest Butterworth Jr. as Jerry Dunn Jr.
- Will Badger as Jerry Dunn Sr.

== Preservation ==
With no prints of Her Mad Bargain located in any film archives, it is considered a lost film.
