= The Silent Power =

1926 film

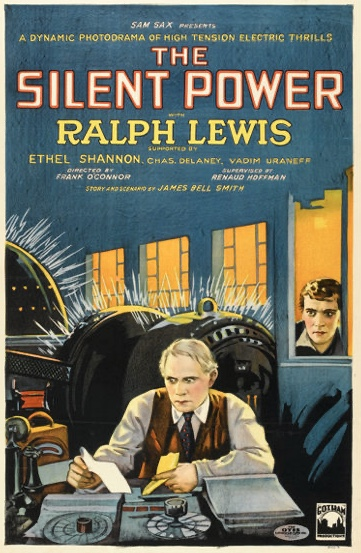
- Directed by: Frank O'Connor
- Written by: James J. Tynan; James Bell Smith
- Produced by: Renaud Hoffman; Samuel Sax
- Starring: Ralph Lewis; Ethel Shannon; Charles Delaney
- Cinematography: Ray June
- Production company: Camera Pictures
- Distributed by: Lumas Film Corporation; Gaumont British Distributors (UK)
- Release date: November 1, 1926
- Running time: 61 minutes
- Country: United States
- Languages: Silent; English intertitles

The Silent Power is a 1926 American silent drama film directed by Frank O'Connor and starring Ralph Lewis, Ethel Shannon and Charles Delaney. It was produced by the independent company Gotham Pictures.

== Synopsis ==
The manager of a hydro-electric plant manages to secure his reckless college graduate son a job working on the construction of a new dam. He falls in love with a woman, but when her crazed brother kills his boss he is arrested and convicted for murder. Sentenced to the electric chair it seems that it will be the unfortunate duty of his father to supply the electricity that will execute his son.

== Cast ==
- Ralph Lewis as John Rollins
- Ethel Shannon as Olive Spencer
- Charles Delaney as Rob Rollins
- Vadim Uraneff as Jerry Spencer
- Robert Homans as David Webster

== Bibliography ==
- Connelly, Robert B. The Silents: Silent Feature Films, 1910-36, Volume 40, Issue 2. December Press, 1998.
- Munden, Kenneth White. The American Film Institute Catalog of Motion Pictures Produced in the United States, Part 1. University of California Press, 1997.
