= Sidney Franklin (actor, born 1870) =

American actor

- Born: May 20, 1870; New York, New York, United States
- Died: March 18, 1931 (aged 60); Los Angeles, California, United States
- Occupation: Actor
- Years active: 1919-1930 (film)

Sidney Franklin (1870–1931) was an American stage and film actor. He appeared in around thirty films during the silent and early sound eras. His final screen performance was in Puttin' On the Ritz in 1930. On stage he portrayed Solomon Levy in the original production of Abie's Irish Rose.

== Partial filmography ==
- The Sleeping Lion (1919)
- Welcome Children (1921)
- The Three Musketeers (1921)
- Playing with Fire (1921)
- The Guttersnipe (1922)
- The Call of Home (1922)
- Dusk to Dawn (1922)
- The Vermilion Pencil (1922)
- The Love Trap (1923)
- Fashion Row (1923)
- A Boy of Flanders (1924)
- The Red Lily (1924)
- In Hollywood with Potash and Perlmutter (1924)
- One of the Bravest (1925)
- His People (1925)
- The Texas Trail (1925)
- Somebody's Mother (1926)
- The Block Signal (1926)
- Savage Passions (1926)
- Rose of the Tenements (1926)
- Colleen (1927)
- Wheel of Chance (1928)
- Lummox (1930)
- Puttin' On the Ritz (1930)

== Bibliography ==
- Bradley, Edwin M. The First Hollywood Musicals: A Critical Filmography Of 171 Features, 1927 Through 1932. McFarland, 2004.
