= Evelyn Campbell =

American screenwriter

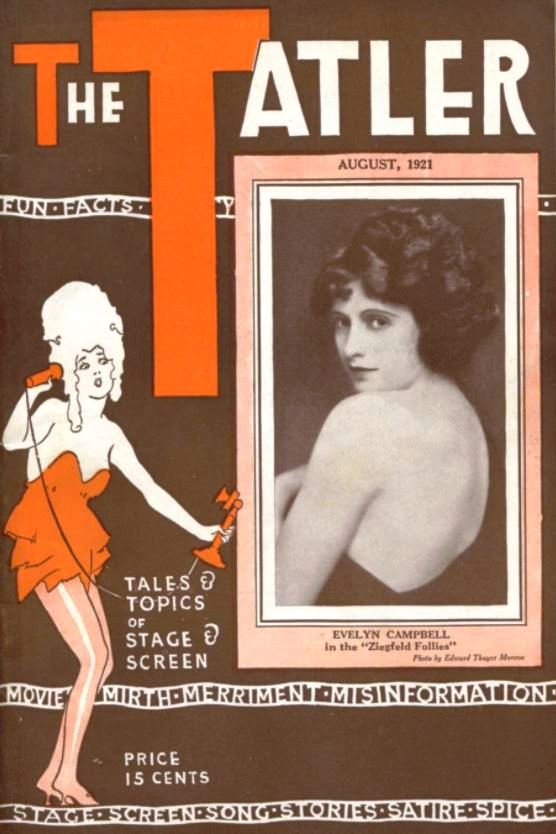
- Born: Evelyn G. Murray; September 3, 1874; Iowa, U.S.
- Died: June 22, 1961 (aged 86); Camarillo, California, U.S.
- Occupation(s): Screenwriter, author

Evelyn Campbell (sometimes known as Evelyn Murray Campbell) was an American screenwriter, writer, and actress active during Hollywood's silent era.

== Biography ==
Campbell was born in Kansas to J.C. Murray (a lawyer) and Maggie Parker; early on, she recalled preferring to read books over playing with dolls while growing up in Missouri. After high school, she began working as a stenographer in St. Louis while working on her writing. She began selling her stories to East Coast magazines around 1918, and soon studios were looking to turn her stories into film scenarios. She also wrote for newspapers, including the Chicago Examiner, The Denver Post, the Dramatic Mirror in New York, and the San Francisco Dramatic and Musical Review.

A few years later, she moved to California to study scenario-writing, and she had soon sold over 18 scripts to various studios, including Universal. She also wrote a number of Western novels over the course of her career.

As an actress, Campbell performed on Broadway in Ziegfeld Follies of 1921 and Make It Snappy (1922).

== Personal life ==
Campbell was married to James Floyd Denison, and they had a son.

== Selected filmography ==
- Bread (1918)
- A Soul for Sale (1918)
- Tony America (1918)
- The Girl with No Regrets (1919)
- Creaking Stairs (1919)
- When Fate Decides (1919)
- The Forgotten Woman (1921)
- Nobody's Bride (1923)
- The Girl Who Came Back (1923)
- Yesterday's Wife (1923)
- Mine to Keep (1923)
- The Love Trap (1923)
- The Marriage Market (1923)
- Other Men's Daughters (1923)
- Discontented Husbands (1924)
- Empty Hearts (1924)
- Early to Wed (1926)
- The Gilded Butterfly (1927)
- A Harp in Hock (1927)
- The Masked Angel (1928)
- Hurricane (1929)
- The Western Limited (1932)
