= Linda (1929 film) =

1929 film

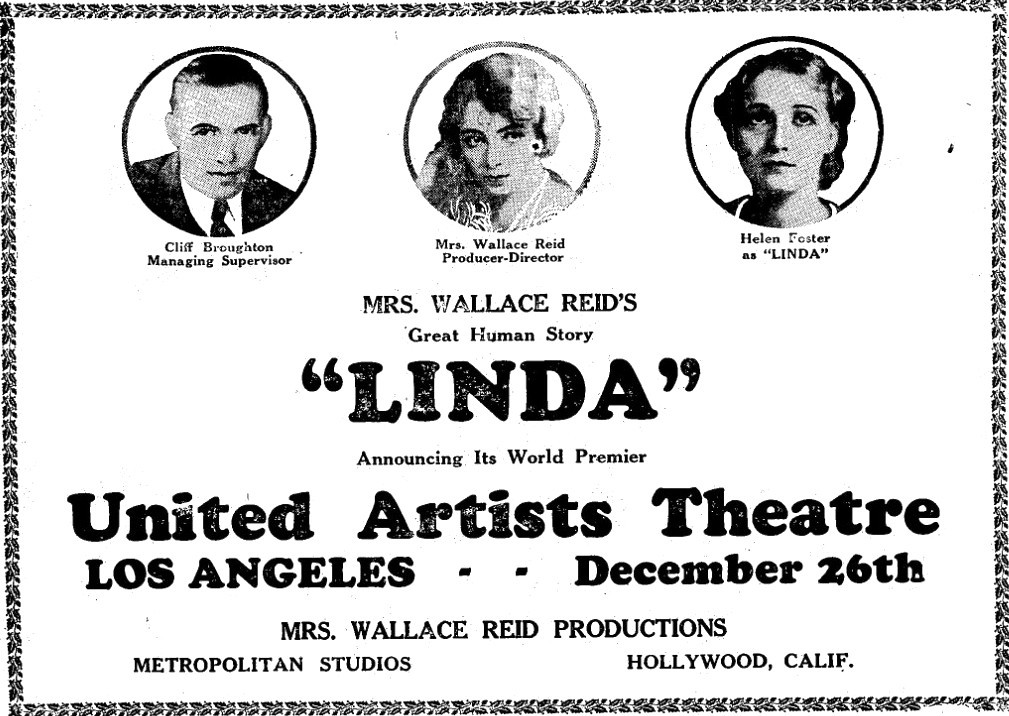
- Advertisement
- Directed by: Dorothy Davenport
- Written by: Maxine Alton
- Produced by: Dorothy Davenport
- Starring: Warner Baxter; Helen Foster
- Cinematography: Bert Baldridge; Henry Cronjager; Ernest Laszlo
- Production company: Mrs. Wallace Reid Productions
- Distributed by: First Division Pictures
- Release date: March 31, 1929
- Running time: 75 minutes (7 reels)
- Country: United States
- Languages: Sound (Synchronized); English intertitles

Linda is a 1929 American sound drama film directed by Dorothy Davenport (as Mrs. Wallace Reid). It is based on the 1912 novel Linda by Margaret Prescott Montague. While the film has no audible dialog, it was released with a synchronized musical score with sound effects using both the sound-on-disc and sound-on-film process.

== Plot ==
Linda (1929)

Linda, a tender, romantic girl, is forced by her brutal father to marry Decker, an elderly lumberman who quickly realizes that Linda is not happy with him and does everything he can to make her life easier. Linda falls in love with Dr. Paul Randall, but remains with her husband until a scheming woman steps in and claims to be Decker's first and legal wife. Linda then goes to the city to live with her former schoolteacher and again meets Dr. Randall, but must leave him to return north and care for Decker, who has been hurt in a lumbering accident. Learning that the woman claiming to be Decker's wife is a fraud, Linda gallantly sticks with her husband until he finally dies from his injuries. Linda and the good doctor are then free to find happiness with each other.

== Cast ==
- Warner Baxter as Dr. Paul Randall
- Helen Foster as Linda
- Noah Beery, Sr. as Armstrong Decker
- Mitchell Lewis as Buddy Stillwater
- Kate Price as Nan
- Allen Connor as Kenneth Whitmore
- Bess Flowers as Annette Whitmore
- Billie Brockwell as Mother / Mrs. Stillwater
- Monty O'Grady as Spider

=== Uncredited ===
- James Conaty as Party Guest
- Jackie Levine as Stillwater Child
- Andy Shuford as Buddy Stillwater
- Blackjack Ward as Lumberjack

== Music ==
The film featured a theme song entitled Linda with music by Al Sherman and words by Charles Tobias and Harry Tobias.

== See also ==
- List of early sound feature films (1926–1929)
