= One of the Bravest =

1925 film

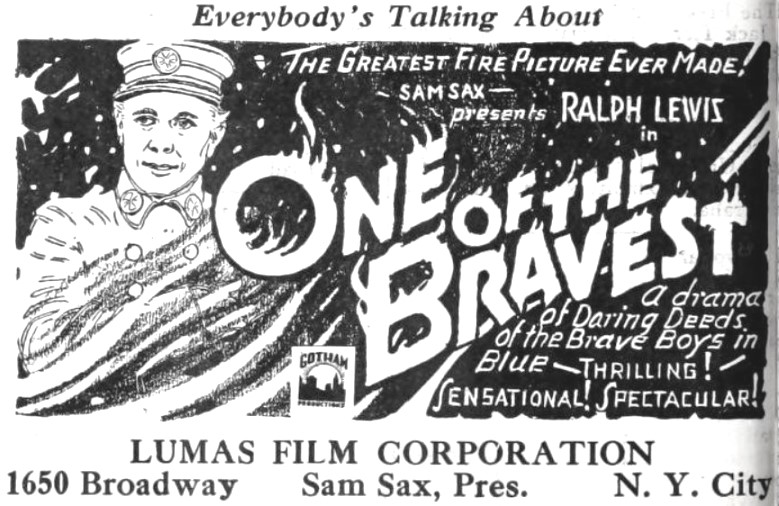
- Advertisement
- Directed by: Frank O'Connor
- Written by: James J. Tynan; Henry McCarty
- Produced by: Renaud Hoffman; Samuel Sax
- Starring: Ralph Lewis; Edward Hearn; Pat Somerset
- Cinematography: Ray June
- Edited by: Irene Morra
- Production company: Gotham Pictures
- Distributed by: Lumas Film Corporation; Stoll Pictures (UK)
- Release date: October 19, 1925
- Running time: 60 minutes
- Country: United States
- Language: Silent (English intertitles)

One of the Bravest is a 1925 American silent action drama film directed by Frank O'Connor and starring Ralph Lewis, Edward Hearn, and Pat Somerset.

== Plot ==
A father of Irish heritage rejects his firefighter son when he marries and Jewish girl, and wrongly suspects him of being a coward.

== Cast ==
- Ralph Lewis as John Kelly
- Edward Hearn as Dan Kelly
- Sidney Franklin as Morris Levin
- Pat Somerset as 'Satin' Sanderson
- Claire McDowell as Mrs. Kelly
- Marion Mack as Sarah Levin
- Mary Gordon as Tenement Boy's Mother
- Austen Jewell as Tenement Boy

== Preservation ==
A complete print of One of the Bravest is held by the Library of Congress.

== Bibliography ==
- Munden, Kenneth White. The American Film Institute Catalog of Motion Pictures Produced in the United States, Part 1. University of California Press, 1997.
