= Lightning Romance =

1924 film directed by Albert S. Rogell

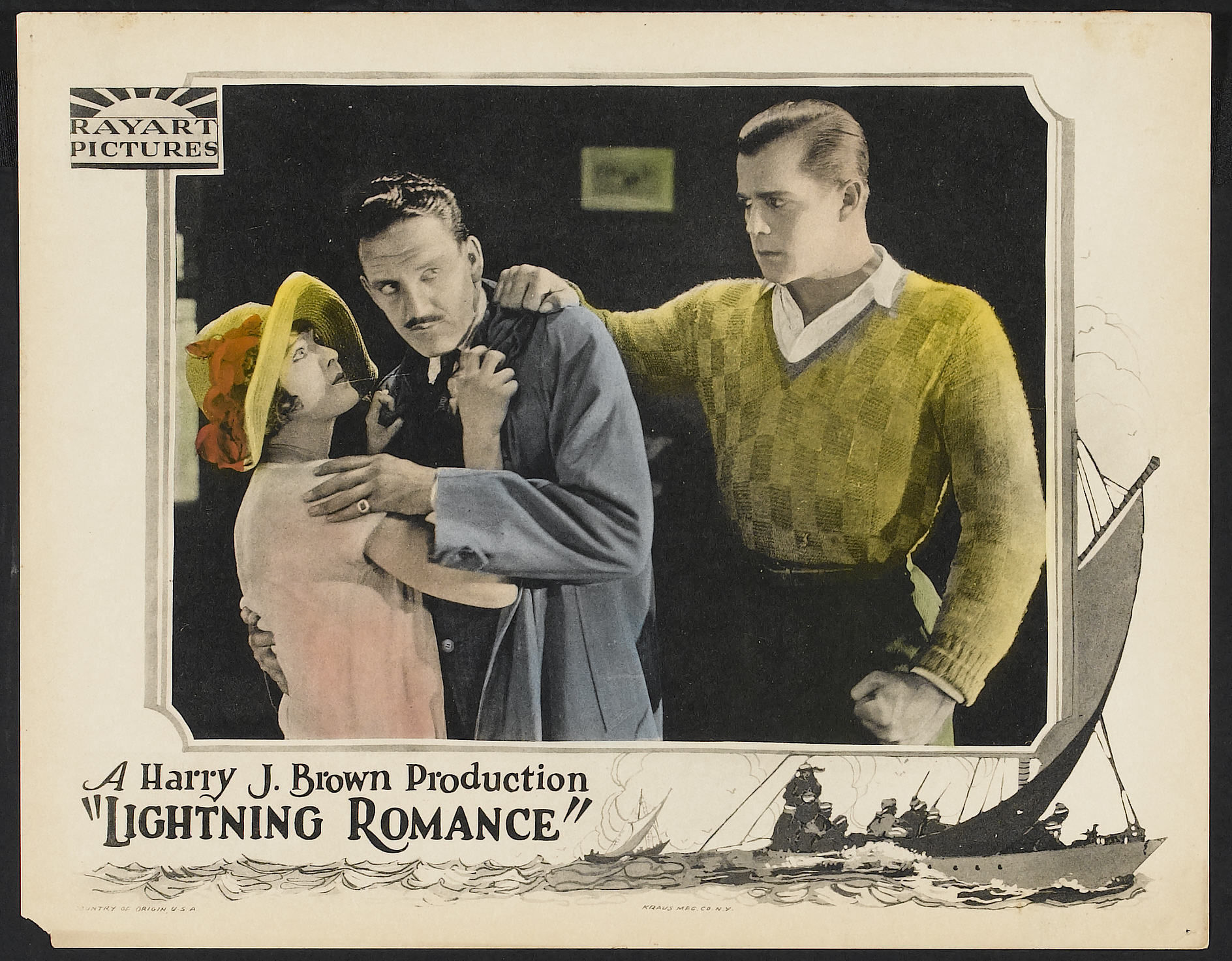
- Directed by: Albert S. Rogell
- Written by: Marion Jackson
- Produced by: W. Ray Johnston
- Starring: Reed Howes; Ethel Shannon; Wilfred Lucas
- Cinematography: Ross Fisher
- Production company: Harry J. Brown Productions
- Distributed by: Rayart Pictures
- Release date: November 15, 1924
- Country: United States
- Languages: Silent; English intertitles

Lightning Romance is a 1924 American silent action film. It was directed by Albert S. Rogell and stars Reed Howes, Ethel Shannon, and Wilfred Lucas.

== Cast ==
- Reed Howes as Jack Wade
- Ethel Shannon as Lila Grandon
- Wilfred Lucas as Richard Wade
- David Kirby as Red Tayor
- Cuyler Supplee as Arnold Stewart
- Frank Hagney as Arizona Joe
- H.C. Hallett as Butler

== Bibliography ==
- Langman, Larry. A Guide to Silent Westerns. Greenwood Publishing Group, 1992.
