= Stool Pigeon (1928 film) =

1928 film

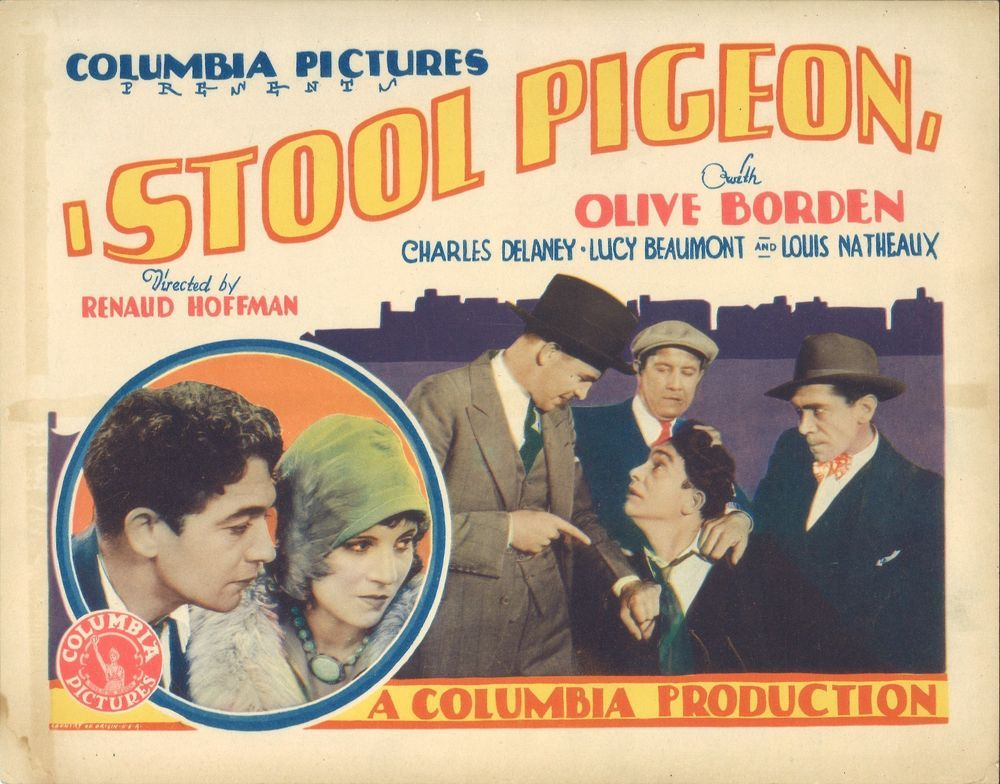
- Directed by: Renaud Hoffman
- Written by: Stuart Anthony; Mort Blumenstock; Edward J. Meagher
- Produced by: Jack Cohn
- Starring: Olive Borden; Charles Delaney; Lucy Beaumont
- Cinematography: Ted Tetzlaff
- Edited by: Arthur Roberts
- Production company: Columbia Pictures
- Distributed by: Columbia Pictures
- Release date: October 25, 1928
- Running time: 56 minutes
- Country: United States
- Languages: Silent; English intertitles

Stool Pigeon is a 1928 American silent crime film directed by Renaud Hoffman and starring Olive Borden, Charles Delaney and Lucy Beaumont.

== Cast ==
- Olive Borden as Goldie
- Charles Delaney as Jimmy Wells
- Lucy Beaumont as Mrs. Wells
- Louis Natheaux as Butch
- Ernie Adams as Dropper
- Al Hill as Red
- Robert Wilber as Augie
- Clarence Burton as Mike Shields

== Preservation and status ==
As of January 2017, a complete copy of the film was archived at Lobster Films in Paris. Lobster Films restores and distributes vintage film. However, in 2020, a fire occurred at an apartment building in Paris where Lobster Film's had temporarily stored highly flammable nitrate film reels without air conditioning during a heatwave. Up to 1,953 nitrate film reels were estimated as being stored at the location when the fire occurred, but film titles were not reported.

== Bibliography ==
- Munden, Kenneth White. The American Film Institute Catalog of Motion Pictures Produced in the United States, Part 1. University of California Press, 1997.
