= Hellship Bronson =

1928 film

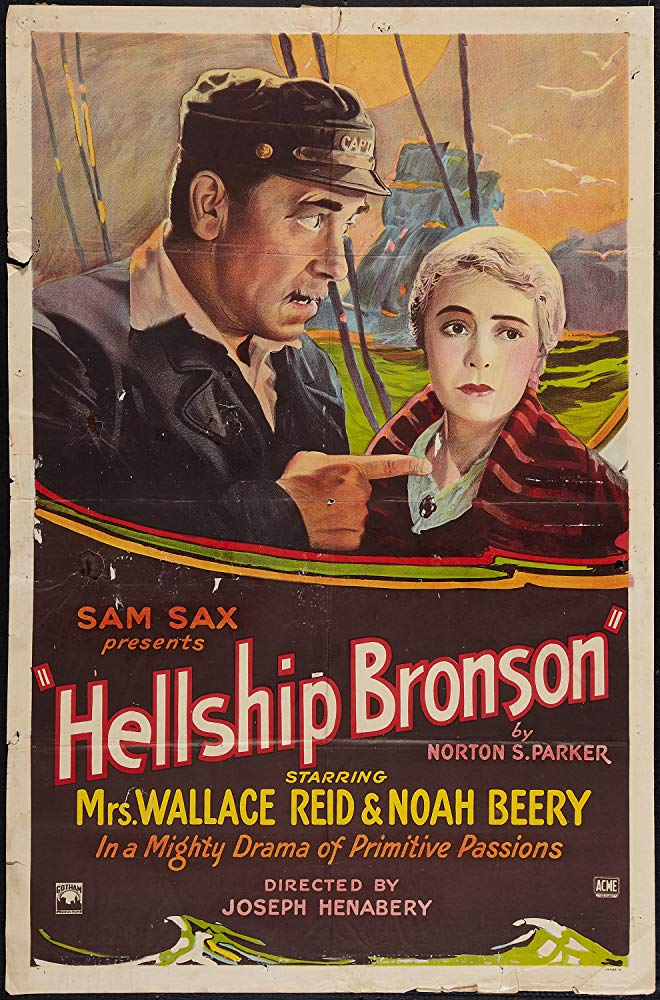
- Film poster
- Directed by: Joseph Henabery
- Written by: Louis Stevens; Terrence Daugherty (intertitles)
- Story by: Norton S. Parker
- Produced by: Gotham Productions; Samuel Sax; Harold Shumate
- Starring: Noah Beery; Dorothy Davenport
- Cinematography: Ray June
- Edited by: W. Donn Hayes
- Production company: Gotham Pictures
- Distributed by: Lumas Pictures
- Release date: May 1928
- Running time: 1 hour 10 min.
- Country: United States
- Language: Silent (English intertitles)

Hellship Bronson is a 1928 American silent adventure film directed by Joseph Henabery and starring Noah Beery and Dorothy Davenport (credited as Mrs. Wallace Reid). It was produced by Gotham Pictures and distributed by Lumas Film Corporation.

== Cast ==
- Dorothy Davenport as Mrs. Bronson (credited as Mrs. Wallace Reid)
- Noah Beery as Capt. Ira Bronson
- Reed Howes as Tim Bronson
- Helen Foster as Mary Younger
- James Bradbury Jr. as The Hoofer
- Jack Anthony as Abner Starke

== Preservation ==
With no prints of Hellship Bronson located in any film archives, it is a lost film.
