= Daughters of the Rich =

1923 film

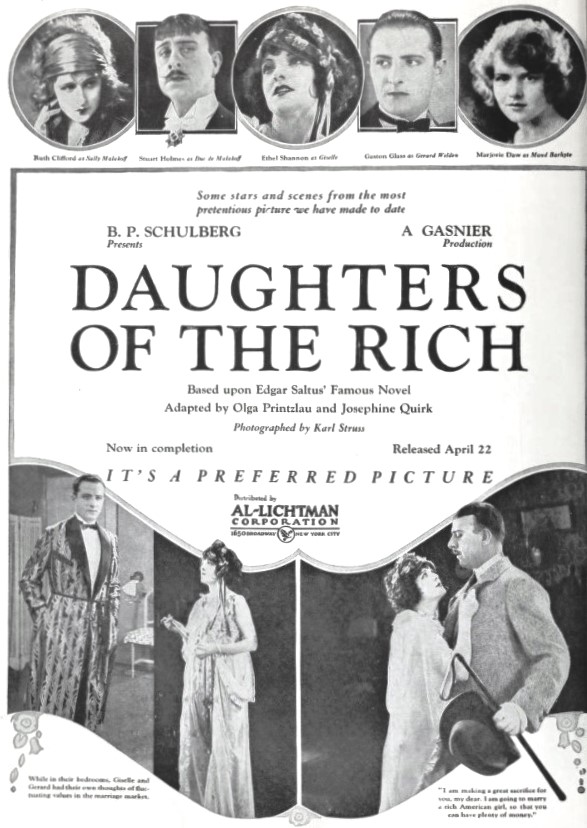
- Advertisement with Marjorie Daw in the cast
- Directed by: Louis J. Gasnier
- Written by: Olga Printzlau; Josephine Quirk
- Based on: Daughters of the Rich by Edgar Saltus
- Produced by: B.P. Schulberg
- Starring: Miriam Cooper; Gaston Glass; Ethel Shannon
- Cinematography: Karl Struss
- Production company: B.P. Schulberg Productions
- Distributed by: Preferred Pictures
- Release date: June 15, 1923
- Running time: 60 minutes
- Country: United States
- Language: Silent (English intertitles)

Daughters of the Rich is a 1923 American silent drama film directed by Louis J. Gasnier and starring Miriam Cooper, Gaston Glass, and Ethel Shannon based upon the 1900 novel of the same name by Edgar Saltus.

== Cast ==
- Miriam Cooper as Maud Barhyte
- Gaston Glass as Gerald Welden
- Ethel Shannon as Mademoiselle Giselle
- Ruth Clifford as Sally Malakoff
- Josef Swickard as Maud's Father
- Truly Shattuck as Sally's Mother
- Stuart Holmes as Duc de Malakoff

== Production ==
In the pre-release version of the film, Marjorie Daw played Cooper's character, Maud Barhyte. Apparently, a decision was made to emphasis Maud in the film over the Ruth Clifford character Sally Malakoff, which resulted in the change in cast for the released version of the film.

== Preservation ==
With no prints of Daughters of the Rich located in any film archives, it is a lost film.

== Bibliography ==
- Goble, Alan. The Complete Index to Literary Sources in Film. Walter de Gruyter, 1999.
