= Ethel Shannon =

American actress (1898–1951)

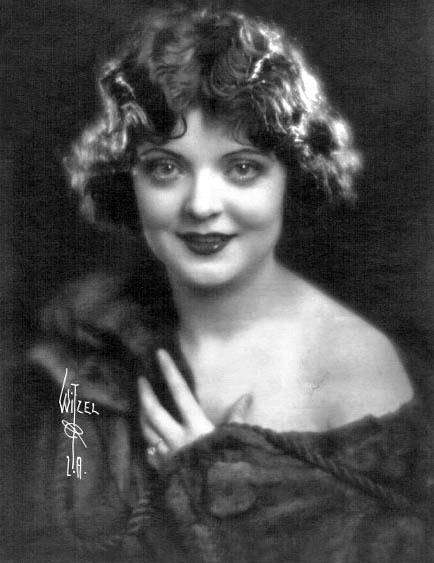
- Portrait by Albert Witzel, 1920s
- Born: May 22, 1898; Denver, Colorado, U.S.
- Died: July 10, 1951 (aged 53); Los Angeles, California, U.S.
- Resting place: Forest Lawn Memorial Park, Glendale, California
- Other names: Ethel Shannon Jackson
- Occupation: Actress
- Years active: 1919–1927
- Spouses: Robert Cary (divorced) Joseph Jackson (m. 1927; died 1932)

Ethel Shannon (May 22, 1898 – July 10, 1951) was an American actress. She appeared in over 30 silent movies in the early 20th century.

== Early life and career ==
Ethel Shannon was born in Denver, Colorado, the daughter of James and Agnes (Knight) Shannon. After finishing school, she moved to Hollywood. Not long afterward, she was asked by a friend if she wanted to work as an extra in a movie and she readily said yes. The extra part lasted several days and, before she left the studio, Shannon was offered a role in a Bert Lytell comedy, Easy to Make Money (1919), which sparked her career.

After playing the role as Gwendolyn, the American, in Tsuru Aoki's Universal Studios production, The Breath of the Gods (1920), Shannon replaced Josephine Hill as leading lady with Universal's western star, Hoot Gibson. Shannon later signed a contract with B.P. Schulberg and became a featured player. She was selected by Schulberg to play the principal feminine role in the most extravagantly produced picture at Schulberg Studios, Daughters of the Rich (1923), from the book of the same title by Edgar Saltus. In her first production, Shannon had a supporting cast that included at least half a dozen players who either had appeared as stars in their own right, or had seen their names in lights as featured players.

Shannon was chosen as one of the WAMPAS Baby Stars of 1923, along with Eleanor Boardman, Evelyn Brent, Dorothy Devore, Virginia Browne Faire, Betty Francisco, Pauline Garon, Kathleen Key, Laura La Plante, Margaret Leahy, Helen Lynch, Derelys Perdue, and Jobyna Ralston. In the mid-1920s she appeared in several films produced by Gotham Pictures.

She appeared opposite Harry Carey in The Texas Trail (1925) and The New York Times proclaimed her "one of the best leading women you could imagine for this kind of photoplay." Despite good reviews and a promising future, Shannon's last movie role was as Ruth Morris in Through Thick and Thin (1927) opposite William Fairbanks. She then retired from the screen to become a wife and "take up a home-making career."

== Personal life ==
She was first married to broker Robert Cary and divorced.

She and Joseph Jackson (June 8, 1894 – May 26, 1932), screenwriter and former press agent, were married April 10, 1927, at the Wilshire Boulevard Congregational Church, Los Angeles. The couple then moved into a new home on Tuxedo Terrace in the Hollywood Hills. They had one son, Joseph Shannon Jackson (born September 11, 1928). At a housewarming party for newlyweds Charles Kenyon and Jane Winton in October 1927, Shannon was there "looking altogether too pretty to quit the screen," but declared herself quite contented. "On the way over here," she joked, "I thought of all the famous red heads of history, so as to be able to forget the fact that I had cooked the dinner at home myself! 'What,' I said to myself, 'would my public think of me if they knew I had really peeled the potatoes myself?' " Her marriage to Joe Jackson ended when he drowned while swimming at Laguna Beach in 1932.

== Later years ==
Although it was announced a couple of times that Shannon was to marry again, she apparently never did. In August 1935, an article in the Los Angeles Times stated that the "piquant red-haired" actress was coming out of her retirement to resume her career as she was signed to a long-term contract by Warner Bros. and given, as her first assignment, an important part in Stars Over Broadway and was to be billed as Ethel Shannon Jackson.

The occurrence that changed her comeback to the screen is uncertain, but Shannon's final movie appearance turned out to be an uncredited role as "a woman" in Stars Over Broadway (1935), starring Pat O'Brien and Jane Froman.

== Death ==
Ethel Shannon died at age 53 in Los Angeles. She is interred in Forest Lawn Cemetery, Glendale, California.

== Partial filmography ==
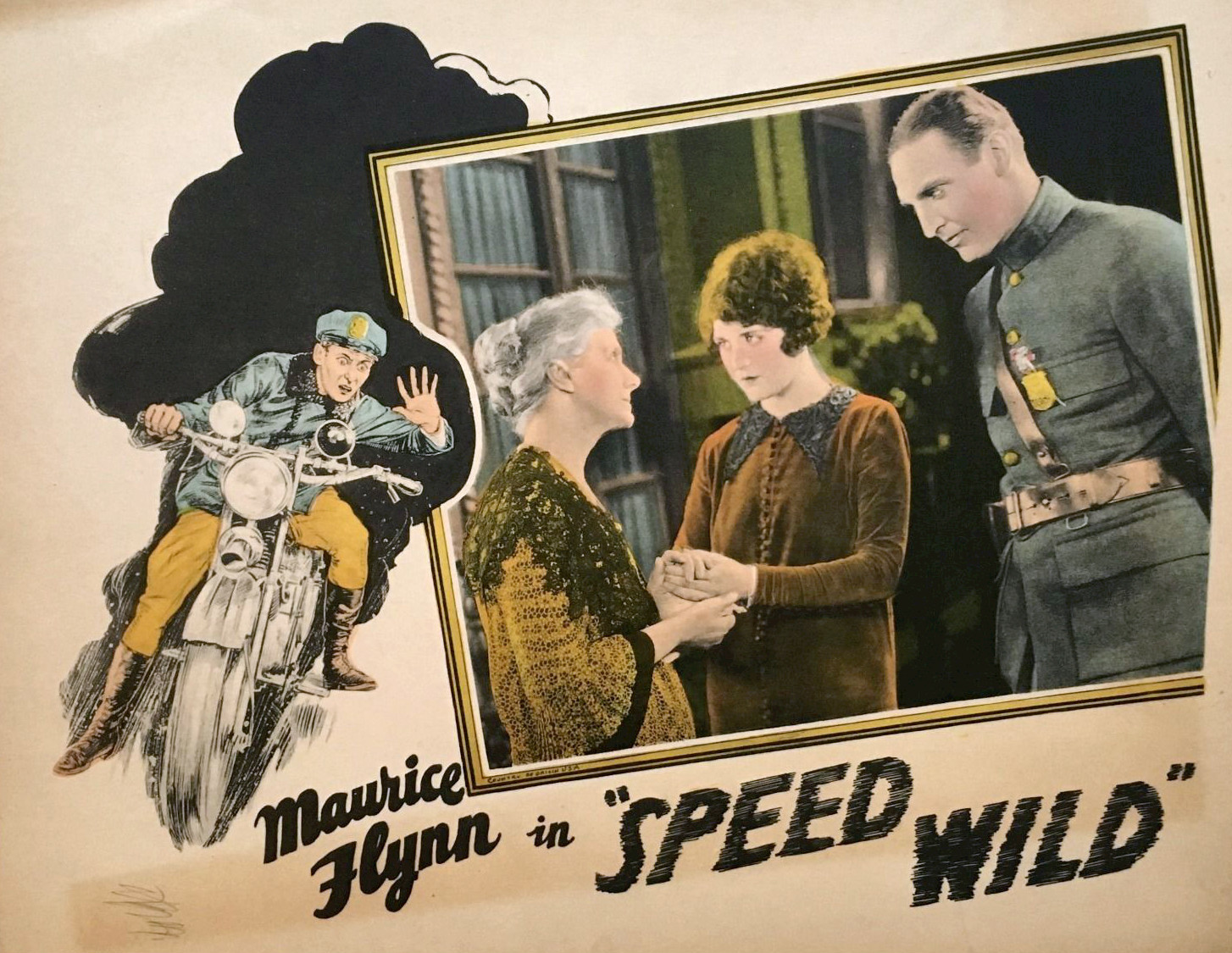
Lobby card for Speed Wild (1925)

- John Petticoats (1919)
- Easy to Make Money (1919)
- Roarin' Dan (1920)
- A Master Stroke (1920)
- The Breath of the Gods (1920)
- An Old Fashioned Boy (1920)
- Beware of the Bride (1920)
- The Hope Diamond Mystery (1921)
- Top o' the Morning (1922)
- Man's Law and God's (1922)
- Watch Him Step (1922)
- Maytime (1923)
- The Girl Who Came Back (1923)
- Daughters of the Rich (1923)
- The Hero (1923)
- Lightning Romance (1924)
- Riders Up (1924)
- The Texas Trail (1925)
- Speed Wild (1925)
- Stop Flirting (1925)
- High and Handsome (1925)
- The Phantom Express (1925)
- Charley's Aunt (1925)
- The Buckaroo Kid (1926)
- Danger Quest (1926)
- The Speed Limit (1926)
- The Sign of the Claw (1926)
- The High Flyer (1926)
- Oh, Baby! (1926)
- The Silent Power (1926)
- Babe Comes Home (1927)
- Through Thick and Thin (1927)
- Backfire (1935)
