= Heroes of the Night =

1927 film

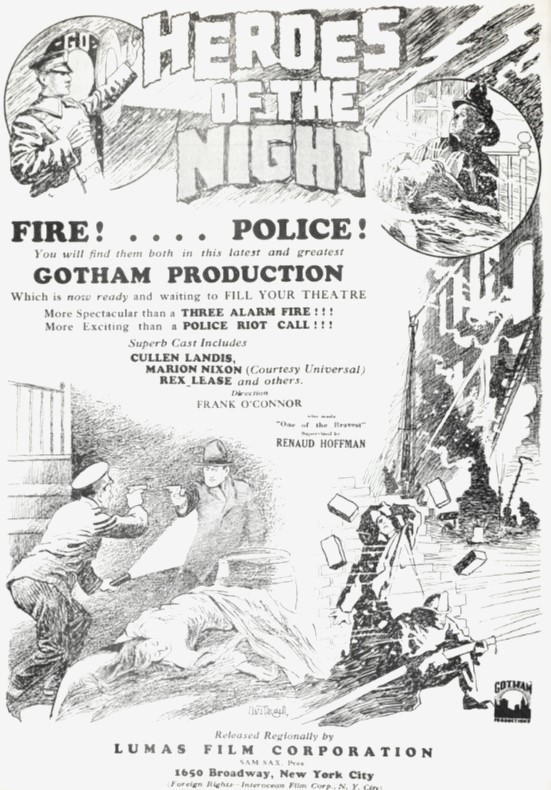
- Advertisement
- Directed by: Frank O'Connor
- Written by: F. Oakley Crawford (adaptation, continuity)
- Based on: story by James J. Tynan
- Produced by: Sam Sax; Renaud Hoffman
- Starring: Cullen Landis
- Cinematography: Ray June
- Production company: Gotham Pictures
- Distributed by: Lumas Film Corporation
- Release date: January 2, 1927
- Running time: 70 minutes; 7 reels
- Country: United States
- Language: Silent (English intertitles)

Heroes of the Night is a 1927 American silent drama film directed by Frank O'Connor and starring Cullen Landis. It was produced by Gotham Pictures and released by Lumas Film Corporation.

== Cast ==
- Cullen Landis as Joe Riley
- Marion Nixon as Mary Allen
- Rex Lease as Tom Riley
- Wheeler Oakman as Jack Nichols
- Sarah Padden as Mrs. Riley
- J. P. Lockney as Marty Allen
- Robert Homans as "Bull" Corrigan
- Lois Ingraham as Jennie Lee

== Preservation ==
The film is preserved in the Library of Congress collection.
