= Josephine Quirk =

American screenwriter

- Born: May 15, 1882; New York, New York, USA
- Died: July 1976; New York, New York, USA
- Occupation(s): Screenwriter, film producer
- Years active: 1921–1929

Josephine L. Quirk (May 15, 1882 – July 1976) was an American screenwriter, film producer, and writer active during Hollywood's silent era.

== Biography ==
Quirk was born in New York City into an Irish family, the daughter of Irish emigrants Timothy and Kate Quirk. She had two siblings who died young and three brothers who survived into adulthood: Cornelius, James, and John. Cornelius was a successful cotton merchant and left her $2,000 (equivalent to $41,000 in 2024) when he died in 1931.

Quirk began her career as a publicity woman and magazine writer on the East Coast before transitioning into scenario writing in Los Angeles. She worked as a scenarist at Famous Players–Lasky before writing scripts for Chadwick Pictures. In 1929, she was hired to write a series of 12 two-reel stories featuring actor George McIntosh.

A devout Catholic, she eventually became disenchanted with Hollywood and what she perceived as its moral failings, and became a contributing editor at The Victorian (a Catholic magazine) and The Catholic Boy during the 1940s and 1950s, where she covered topics like juvenile delinquency, the ills of marijuana, the perils of alcohol, and Communism.

== Selected filmography ==
- Blondes by Choice (1927)
- The Love Wager (1927)
- Sunshine of Paradise Alley (1926)
- Friendly Enemies (1925)
- Bluff (1924)
- Daughters of the Rich (1923)
- Lovebound (1923)
- A Question of Honor (1922)
- Her Mad Bargain (1921)
