= The Block Signal =

1926 film

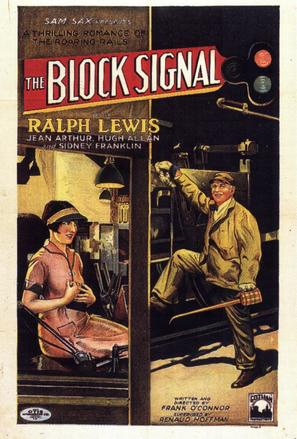
- Directed by: Frank O'Connor
- Written by: Frank O'Connor; Edward J. Meagher
- Story by: F. Oakley Crawford
- Produced by: Renaud Hoffman; Samuel Sax; Earl Hudson
- Starring: Ralph Lewis; Jean Arthur; Hugh Allan
- Cinematography: Ray June
- Production company: Gotham Pictures
- Distributed by: Lumas Film Corporation
- Release date: September 15, 1926
- Running time: 59 minutes
- Country: United States
- Language: Silent (English intertitles)

The Block Signal is 1926 American silent drama film directed by Frank O'Connor and starring Ralph Lewis, Jean Arthur, and Hugh Allan. It was produced by the independent company Gotham Pictures.

== Synopsis ==
A veteran railroad engineer discovers that his eyesight is failing and he is becoming colorblind. Bert Steele his fireman who craves promotion deliberately misleads him about a signal leading him to be demoted. Jealous and frustrated by his unrequited love for the engineer's daughter Grace, Steele considers a more direct form of sabotage.

== Cast ==
- Ralph Lewis as 'Jovial Joe' Ryan
- Jean Arthur as Grace Ryan
- Hugh Allan as Jack Milford
- George Chesebro as Bert Steele
- Sidney Franklin as 'Roadhouse' Rosen
- Leon Holmes as 'Unhandy' Andy
- Missouri Royer as Jim Brennan

== Preservation ==
Prints of The Block Signal are preserved at the UCLA Film & Television Archive and Academy Film Archive.

== Bibliography ==
- Connelly, Robert B. The Silents: Silent Feature Films, 1910-36, Volume 40, Issue 2. December Press, 1998. ISBN 978-0-913204-36-8
- Munden, Kenneth White. The American Film Institute Catalog of Motion Pictures Produced in the United States, Part 1. University of California Press, 1997. ISBN 978-0-520-20970-1
