= Blaze o' Glory =

1929 film

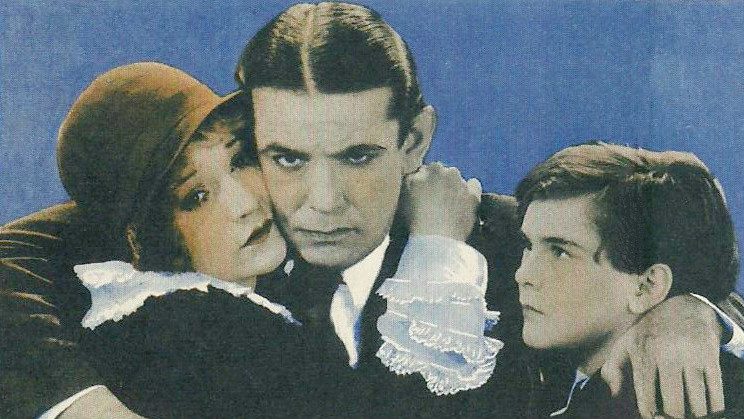
- Scene with Eddie Dowling, Betty Compson and Frankie Darro
- Directed by: George Crone; Renaud Hoffman
- Written by: Thomas Alexander Boyd (story: The Long Shot); Renaud Hoffman; Henry McCarty
- Produced by: O. E. Goebel; George W. Weeks
- Starring: Eddie Dowling; Betty Compson
- Cinematography: Harry Jackson
- Edited by: Arthur Huffsmith
- Distributed by: Sono Art-World Wide Pictures
- Release date: December 30, 1929
- Running time: 78 minutes
- Country: United States
- Language: English

Blaze o' Glory is a 1929 American musical war film directed by George Crone and Renaud Hoffman. It stars Eddie Dowling and Betty Compson.

The soundtrack survives.

== Plot ==
At the stand of his murder trial, defendant Eddie Williams recounts his experiences. In 1917, he had a successful Broadway stage career and marriage to Helen Williams. However, with the American entry into World War I he was sent to the Western Front and debilitated by poison gas when saving an Imperial German Army soldier. After returning home Eddie becomes unemployed, while to his chagrin Helen is able to hold a job. After finding Helen in an affair with her employer Carl Hummel, he shoots Hummel in a fit of rage. The District Attorney reveals that Helen only entered the relationship to gain the job to support Eddie, and they reconcile. Although Eddie confessed to the murder, the jury acquits him.

== Cast ==
- Eddie Dowling as Eddie Williams
- Betty Compson as Helen Williams
- Frankie Darro as Jean Williams
- Henry B. Walthall as Burke
- William B. Davidson as District Attorney (credited as William Davidson)
- Ferdinand Schumann-Heink as Carl Hummel
- Eddie Conrad as Abie
- Frank Sabini as Tony
- Broderick O'Farrell

== See also ==
- List of early sound feature films (1926–1929)
