= The Masked Angel =

1928 film

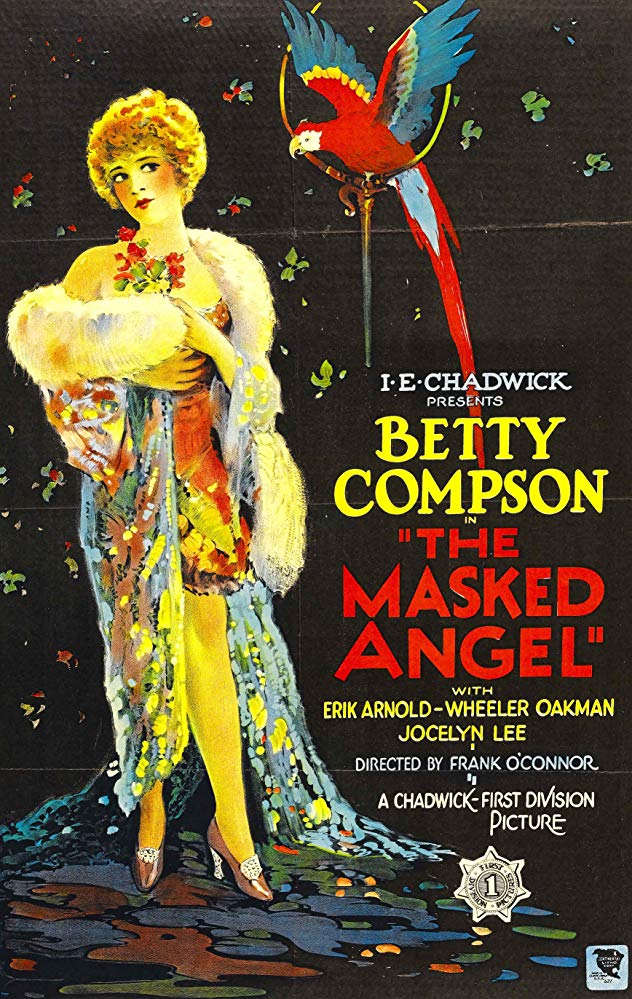
- Directed by: Frank O'Connor
- Written by: Maxine Alton (scenario); Isadore Bernstein (titles); Leon Lee (titles)
- Based on: "Remorse" (short story by Evelyn Campbell in Redbook
- Produced by: I. E. Chadwick
- Starring: Betty Compson
- Cinematography: Ted Tetzlaff
- Distributed by: Chadwick Pictures
- Release date: June 29, 1928
- Running time: 72 minutes
- Country: United States
- Language: Silent..English titles

The Masked Angel is a 1928 silent romantic drama film directed by Frank O'Connor and starring Betty Compson. It was produced and distributed by independent studio Chadwick Pictures. Maxine Alton wrote the scenario based on a short story by Evelyn Campbell, which originally appeared in Redbook.

== Cast ==
- Betty Compson - Betty
- Erick Arnold - Jimmy Pruett
- Wheeler Oakman - Luther Spence
- Jocelyn Lee - Lola Dugan
- Grace Cunard - Cactus Kate
- Lincoln Plumer - Wilbur
- Robert Homans - Detective Bives
- Jane Keckley - Nurse

== Preservation ==
The Masked Angel is currently presumed lost. In February of 2021, the film was cited by the National Film Preservation Board on their Lost U.S. Silent Feature Films list.
