= Through Thick and Thin (film) =

1927 film

- Directed by: B. Reeves Eason
- Written by: Edward J. Meagher
- Produced by: Glenn Belt; Samuel Sax
- Starring: William Fairbanks; Ethel Shannon; George Periolat
- Cinematography: Ray June
- Edited by: Fred Burnworth
- Production company: Camera Pictures
- Distributed by: Lumas Film Corporation; Argosy Pictures (UK)
- Release date: September 19, 1927
- Running time: 50 minutes
- Country: United States
- Languages: Silent; English intertitles

Through Thick and Thin is a 1927 American silent crime film directed by B. Reeves Eason and starring William Fairbanks, Ethel Shannon and George Periolat.

== Cast ==
- William Fairbanks as Don Davis
- Ethel Shannon as Ruth Morris
- Jack Curtis as 'Red' Grimley
- George Periolat as James Morris
- Ina Anson as Rita
- Eddy Chandler as Bull
- Fred Behrle as Mike

== Bibliography ==
- Connelly, Robert B. The Silents: Silent Feature Films, 1910-36, Volume 40, Issue 2. December Press, 1998.
- Munden, Kenneth White. The American Film Institute Catalog of Motion Pictures Produced in the United States, Part 1. University of California Press, 1997.
