= Frank O'Connor (director) =

American actor

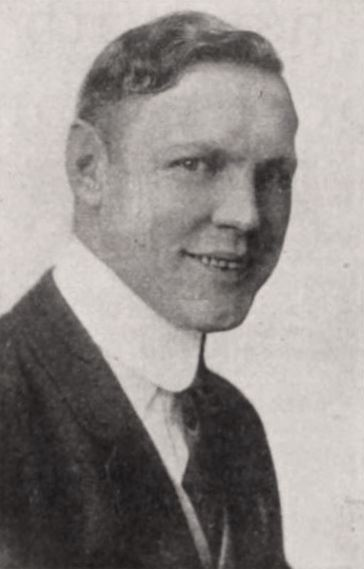
- Portrait of O'Connor in the October 15, 1921 Exhibitors Herald
- Born: c. 1881
- Died: November 22, 1959 (aged 78); Los Angeles, California, United States
- Occupations: Actor, director, writer
- Years active: 1920–59

Frank O'Connor (died November 22, 1959) was an American character actor and director involved in approximately 300 productions. He was a director of several films; he also penned multiple screenplays.

== Career ==
In 1920, Frank O'Connor arrived in Hollywood, where he joined the Lasky Players. Henry Miller mentored him. Later, O'Connor was a freelance writer and character actor. After a career as a film director, he attempted to produce his own and, in the words of the San Francisco Examiner, "went broke"; he subsequently worked as an extra.

== Personal life ==
O'Connor was married to a woman named Susan, and they had three children; his great-granddaughter is Julie Brown. He died in Los Angeles, California on November 22, 1959, at 78 years old.

== Partial filmography ==
Throughout his career, O'Connor was involved in approximately 300 films with various roles, including actor, director, and writer:

- The Unwritten Code (1919), as Thompson
- Everything for Sale (1921), director
- A Virginia Courtship (1921), director
- A Homespun Vamp (1922), director
- The Lawful Cheater (1925), director
- One of the Bravest (1925), director
- Go Straight (1925), director
- Free to Love (1925), director
- The Block Signal (1926), writer and director
- Exclusive Rights (1926), director
- Hearts and Spangles (1926), director
- Devil's Island (1926), director
- The Silent Power (1926), director
- Spangles (1926), director
- Heroes of the Night (1927), director
- Your Wife and Mine (1927), director
- Colleen (1927), director
- Why Sailors Go Wrong (1928), writer
- The Masked Angel (1928), director
- Call of the Circus (1930), director
- King Kong (1933), as Reporter
- Sailor Be Good (1933), writer
- Men of the Night (1934), as Boss painter
- Air Hawks (1935) (uncredited)
- The Whole Town's Talking (1935), as Detective
- His Fighting Blood (1935) (uncredited)
- The Little Colonel, as Aide
- To Mary - with Love (1936), as Conductor
- Wives Never Know (1936), as Police sergeant
- Mr. Smith Goes to Washington (1939), as Senator Alfred
- Adventure in Diamonds (1940), writer
- The Grapes of Wrath (1940), as Deputy
- Man Made Monster (1941), as Detective
- Sunset Murder Case (1941), as Tom O'Connor
- Roar of the Press (1941) (uncredited)
- The Gay Falcon (1941), as Police officer in hallway
- Citizen Kane (1941), as Man at Madison Square Garden
- The Man Who Lost Himself (1941) as cab driver (uncredited)
- X Marks the Spot (1942), as Policeman
- Cover Girl (1944), as Cook
- Lone Texas Ranger (1945), as Horace Carter
- Mama Loves Papa (1945), as Official
- Days of Buffalo Bill (1946), as Sam, cashier
- It's a Wonderful Life (1946) (uncredited)
- Congo Bill (1948)
- Sands of Iwo Jima (1950), as Waiter
- Angel Face (1953), as Bailiff
- Red River Shore (1953) (uncredited)
- My Sister Eileen (1955) (uncredited)
- Jet Pilot (1957) (uncredited)
