= Gotham Pictures Company =

American film company

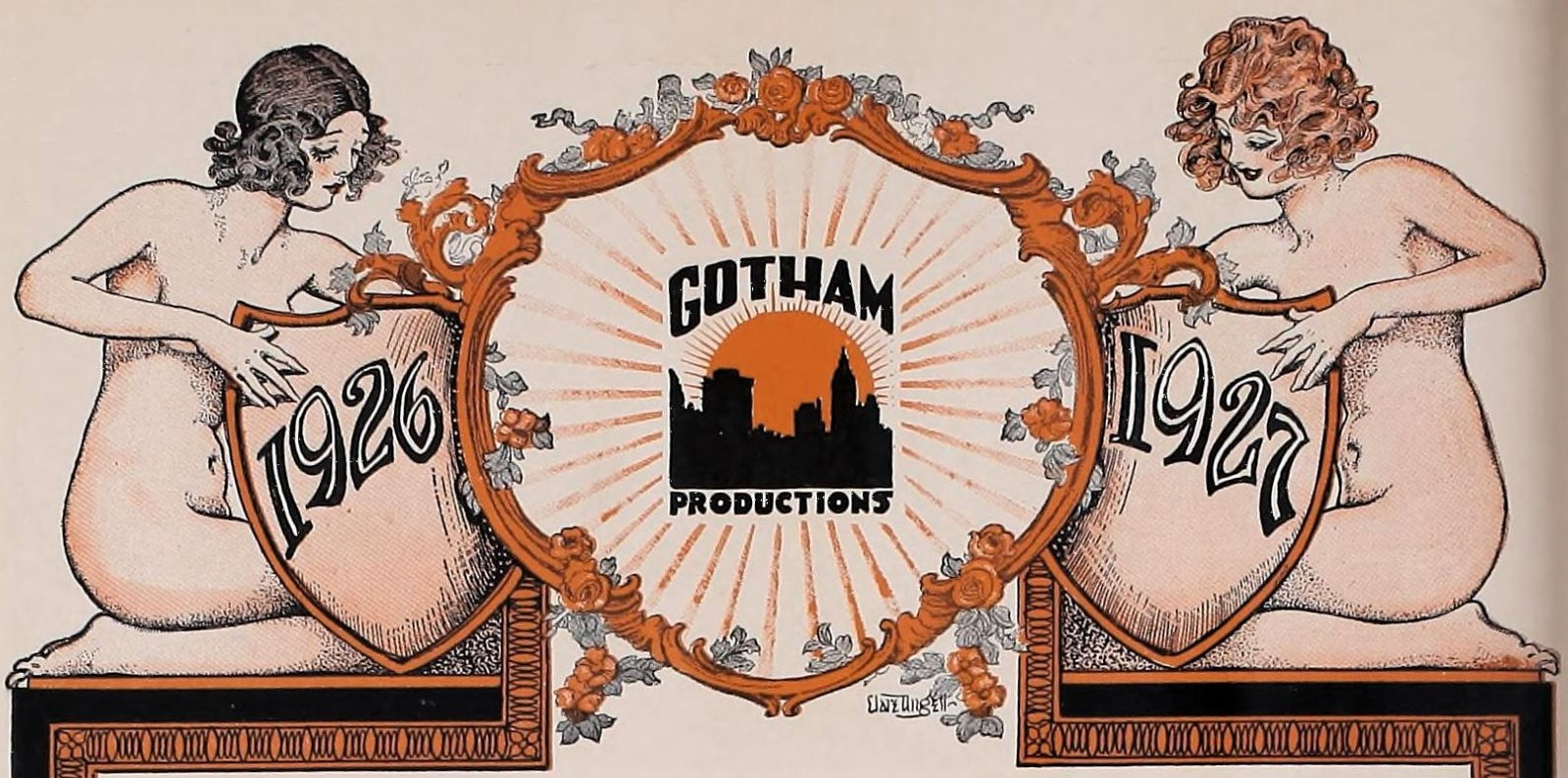
Logo as used in a 1926 ad

Gotham Pictures Company was an American movie production business established in San Antonio in 1916 during the silent film era. Marshall W. Taggart was the company's president. Property in Hot Wells, Texas near San Antonio was planned as an area to build a studio for productions. The company transitioned into the sound era and under its then president Sam Sax joined with RCA Photophone to film The Girl from the Argentine. Gotham worked with Bristolphone to wire theaters in 1928.

Along with Rayart, Gotham was one of the significant independent film industry production houses that operated as Hollywood's dominance was still emerging. Tiffany-Stahl was another independent studio. A number of the company's films were released in Britain by Stoll Pictures, a leading distributor in the country.

== Filmography ==
- Black Lightning (1924)
- Defying the Law (1924)
- Unmarried Wives (1924)
- Women and Gold (1925)
- The Night Ship (1925)
- Silent Pal (1925)
- Shattered Lives (1925)
- The Overland Limited (1925)
- A Little Girl in a Big City (1925)
- The Police Patrol (1925)
- His Master's Voice (1925)
- The Part Time Wife (1925)
- Northern Code (1925)
- One of the Bravest (1925)
- The Shadow on the Wall (1925)
- The Mile-a-Minute Man (1926)
- The Phantom of the Forest (1926)
- The Speed Limit (1926)
- Racing Blood (1926)
- King of the Pack (1926)
- The Silent Power (1926)
- The Sign of the Claw (1926)
- Money to Burn (1926)
- Flying High (1926)
- The Block Signal (1926)
- The Golden Web (1926)
- Hearts and Spangles (1926)
- The Winning Wallop (1926)
- Heroes of the Night (1927)
- When Danger Calls (1927)
- Catch-As-Catch-Can (1927)
- Through Thick and Thin (1927)
- The Silent Avenger (1927)
- Quarantined Rivals (1927)
- Mountains of Manhattan (1927)
- The Down Grade (1927)
- The Girl from Rio (1927)
- The Woman Who Did Not Care (1927)
- The Satin Woman (1927)
- One Chance in a Million (1927)
- Sinews of Steel (1927)
- The Final Extra (1927)
- The Rose of Kildare (1927)
- Blondes by Choice (1927)
- Bare Knees (1928)
- The Head of the Family (1928)
- The Cheer Leader (1928)
- Turn Back the Hours (1928)
- San Francisco Nights (1928)
- Hellship Bronson (1928)
- Midnight Life (1928)
- Through the Breakers (1928)
- United States Smith (1928)
- The River Woman (1928)
- Times Square (1929)
