= Renaud Hoffman =

German-American film producer and director

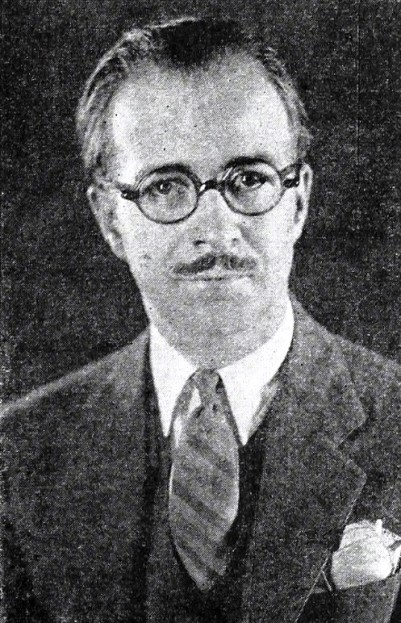
- From a 1925 magazine
- Born: May 22, 1895; German Empire
- Died: November 19, 1952 (aged 57); Riverside County, California, United States
- Occupations: Producer, director, writer
- Years active: 1921-1939 (film)

Renaud Hoffman (1895–1952) was a German-born American film director, screenwriter and producer of the silent and early sound era. He directed the 1929 musical Blaze o' Glory.

== Selected filmography ==
- Strangers of the Night (1923)
- The Legend of Hollywood (1924)
- Which Shall It Be? (1924)
- One of the Bravest (1925)
- His Master's Voice (1925)
- Private Affairs (1925)
- The Unknown Soldier (1926)
- The Block Signal (1926)
- The Phantom of the Forest (1926)
- The Silent Power (1926)
- The Sign of the Claw (1926)
- King of the Pack (1926)
- Racing Blood (1926)
- A Harp in Hock (1927)
- Heroes of the Night (1927)
- Stool Pigeon (1928)
- Blaze o' Glory (1929)
- The Climax (1930)
- Our Neighbors – The Carters (1939)

== Bibliography ==
- Bradley, Edwin M. The First Hollywood Musicals: A Critical Filmography of 171 Features, 1927 through 1932. McFarland, 2004.
