= Luzania =

Luzania may refer to:

- Luzania, a fictional country in the novel Observation on the Spot by Stanisław Lem
- Verónica Luzania, Mexican discus thrower
- Fictional kingdom of Luzania in 1926 American film The Love Toy

== See also ==
- Luziânia
