= Walter Hiers =

American actor (1893–1933)

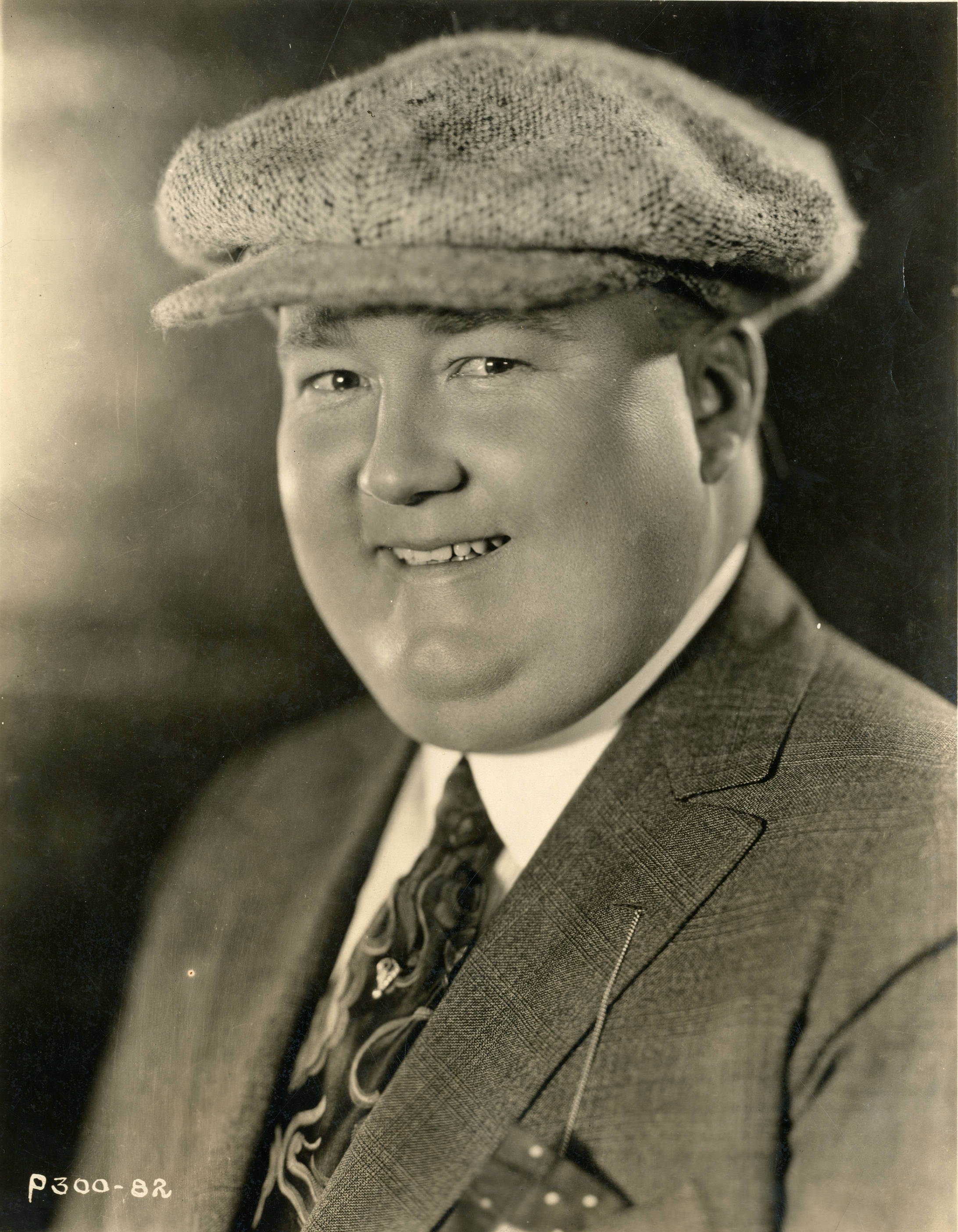
- Hiers in 1923
- Born: July 18, 1893; Cordele, Georgia, U.S.
- Died: February 27, 1933 (aged 39); Los Angeles, California, U.S.
- Occupation: Actor
- Years active: 1913–1932
- Spouse: Adah McWilliams (married 1923)

Walter Hiers (July 18, 1893 – February 27, 1933) was an American silent film actor.

== Biography ==
Born in 1893, during his two decade-long acting career spanning from 1912 to 1932, Hiers acted in 101 films. He was a particularly prolific actor who starred in over 10 films a year. On January 12, 1923, he married Adah McWilliams in Syracuse, New York. He died from pneumonia in 1933, aged 39.

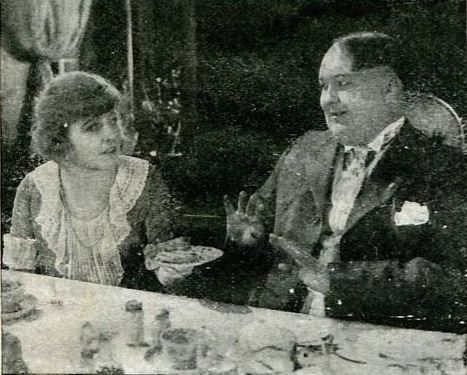
Ethel Clayton and Hiers in A City Sparrow (1920)

== Selected filmography ==
- Seventeen (1916) .... George Cooper
- The Conquest of Canaan (1916) .... Norman Flitcroft
- The Lesson (1917) .... 'Tub' Martin
- Life's Whirlpool (1917) .... Fatty Holmes
- Over There (1917) .... Undetermined Role
- The Mysterious Miss Terry (1917) .... Freddie Bollen
- God's Man (1917) .... Hugo Waldemar
- The End of the Tour (1917) .... 'Skinny' Smith
- Brown of Harvard (1918) .... Tubby
- A Nymph of the Foothills (1918) .... Tubby
- A Man's World (1918) .... Larry Hanlon
- The Accidental Honeymoon (1918) .... Jimmy
- Our Little Wife (1918) .... Bobo Brown
- It Pays to Advertise (1919) .... Ambrose Peale
- Why Smith Left Home (1919) .... Bob White
- Bill Henry (1919) .... Salesman
- The Fear Woman (1919) .... Percy Farwell
- Leave It to Susan (1919) .... Horace Peddingham
- When Doctors Disagree (1919) .... John Turner
- Spotlight Sadie (1919) .... Jack Mills
- Experimental Marriage (1919) .... Charlie Hamilton
- Hard Boiled (1919) .... Hiram Short
- Oh, Lady, Lady (1920) .... Willoughby Finch
- Held by the Enemy (1920) .... Thomas Beene
- A City Sparrow (1920) .... Tim Ennis
- So Long Letty (1920) .... Tommy Robbins
- The Fourteenth Man (1920) .... Harry Brooks
- Going Some (1920) .... Berkeley Fresno
- Miss Hobbs (1920) .... George Jessup
- Mrs. Temple's Telegram (1920) .... Frank Fuller
- The Turning Point (1920) .... Billy Inwood
- Young Mrs. Winthrop (1920) .... Dick Chetwyn
- What's Your Husband Doing? (1920) .... Charley Pidgeon
- The Speed Girl (1921) .... Soapy Taylor
- Her Sturdy Oak (1921) .... Samuel Butteers
- A Kiss in Time (1921) .... Bertie Ballast
- Two Weeks with Pay (1921) .... Hotel Clerk
- Sham (1921) .... Montee Buck
- The Snob (1921) .... Pud Welland
- The Ghost Breaker (1922) .... Rusty Snow
- Is Matrimony a Failure? (1922) .... Jack Hoyt
- Her Gilded Cage (1922) .... Bud Walton
- Bought and Paid For (1922) .... James Gilley
- Sixty Cents an Hour (1923) .... Jimmy Kirk, a soda-jerker
- Mr. Billings Spends His Dime (1923) .... John Percival Billings
- The Triflers (1924) .... Chick Warren
- Along Came Ruth (1924) .... Plinty Bangs
- Christine of the Hungry Heart (1924) .... Dan Madison
- The Virgin (1924) .... Sam Hawkins
- Hold Your Breath (1924) .... Her Fiancé
- Fair Week (1924) .... Slim Swasey
- Flaming Barriers (1924) .... Henry Van Sickle
- Tender Feet (1925)
- A Rarin' Romeo (1925)
- Good Spirits (1925)
- Excuse Me (1925) .... Porter
- Hold That Lion (1926) .... Dick Warren
- Hitchin' Up (1926)
- Fresh Faces (1926)
- A Wireless Lizzie (1926)
- Weak, But Willing (1926)
- Night Life (1927) .... Manager
- Blondes by Choice (1927) .... Horace Rush
- The Girl from Gay Paree (1927) .... Sam
- A Racing Romeo (1927) .... Sparks
- Naughty (1927)
- Beware of Widows (1927) .... William Bradford
- The Wrong Mr. Wright (1927) .... Bond
- Husband Hunters (1927) .... Sylvester Jones
- The First Night (1927) .... Mr. Cleveland
- Speedy (1928) (uncredited) .... The Cook
- A Simple Sap (1928) .... He
- A Woman Against the World (1928) .... Reporter
- A Private Scandal (1931)
