= Patricia Avery =

American actress

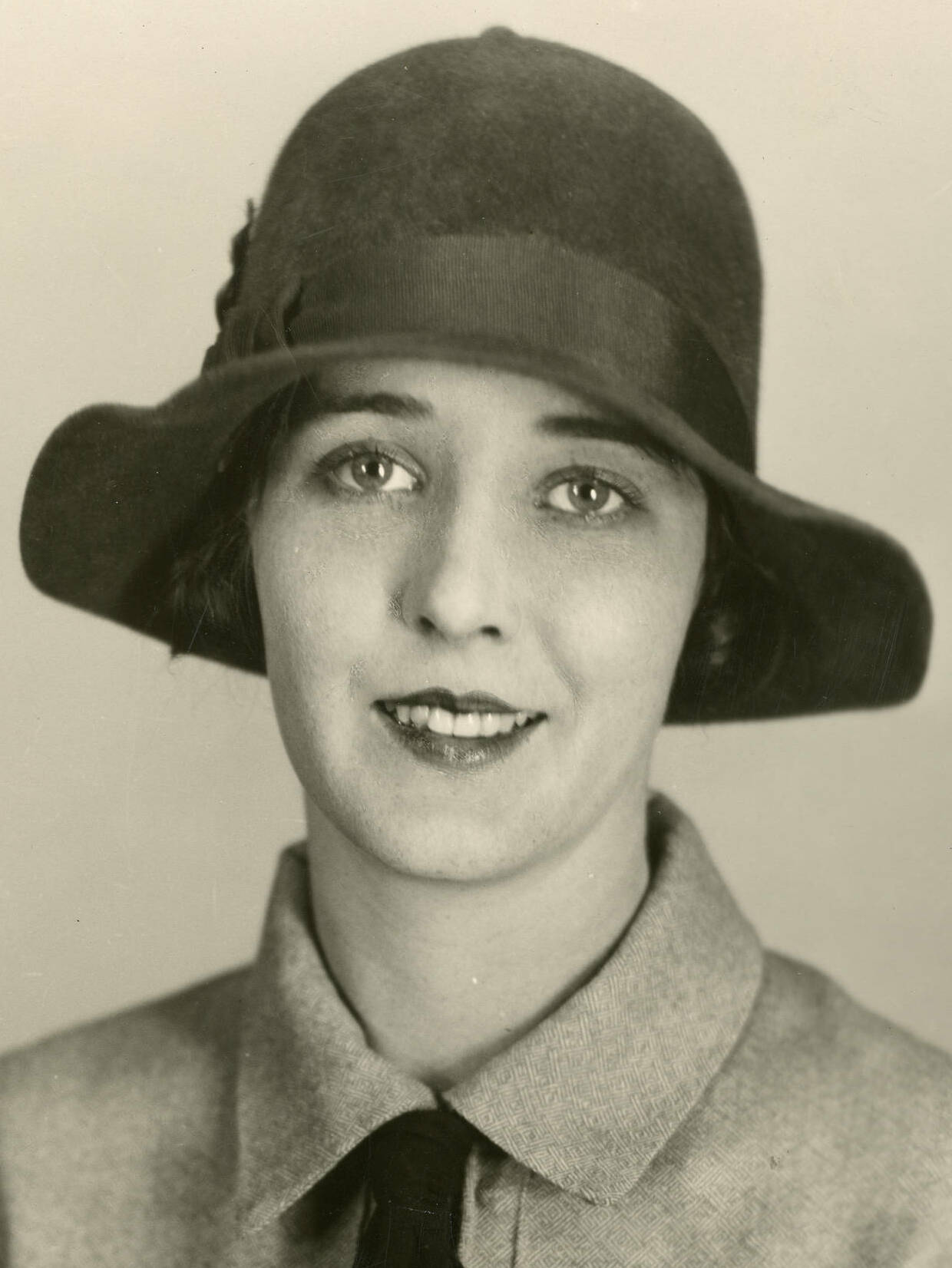
- Born: Elizabeth Anderson Avery; November 12, 1902; Boston, Massachusetts, U.S.
- Died: August 21, 1973 (aged 70); La Crescenta, California, U.S.
- Occupation: Actress
- Spouse: Merrill Pye

Patricia Avery (born Elizabeth Anderson Avery; November 12, 1902 – August 21, 1973) was an American silent film actress of the 1920s.

== Life ==
Born Elizabeth Anderson Avery in Boston, Massachusetts, Avery moved to Hollywood to pursue a career in acting during the early 1920s, and her career started off strong. Her first film role was in 1927 when she starred in Annie Laurie alongside the films lead actress, Lillian Gish. She had roles in three films that year, which led to her being one of thirteen girls selected to be "WAMPAS Baby Stars", a list which included actresses Sally Phipps, Frances Lee and Barbara Kent.

Although it appeared that she was on the way up with her career, she in fact was at its height. She had only one more film role, starring in Alex the Great in 1928 alongside Richard Gallagher and Albert Conti. Her career promptly ended following that film. With no other roles coming her way, she left her short-lived acting career behind her. She would later marry art director Merrill Pye, who would later be nominated for an Oscar for his work on the 1959 film North by Northwest. They resided in La Crescenta, California until her death in 1973.

== Filmography ==
Year	Title	Role	Notes	Ref.
1927	Annie Laurie	Enid		
1927	A Light in the Window	Dorothy Graff		
1927	Night Life	Maid		
1928	Alex the Great	Muriel		
