= Scandal (1929 film) =

1929 film

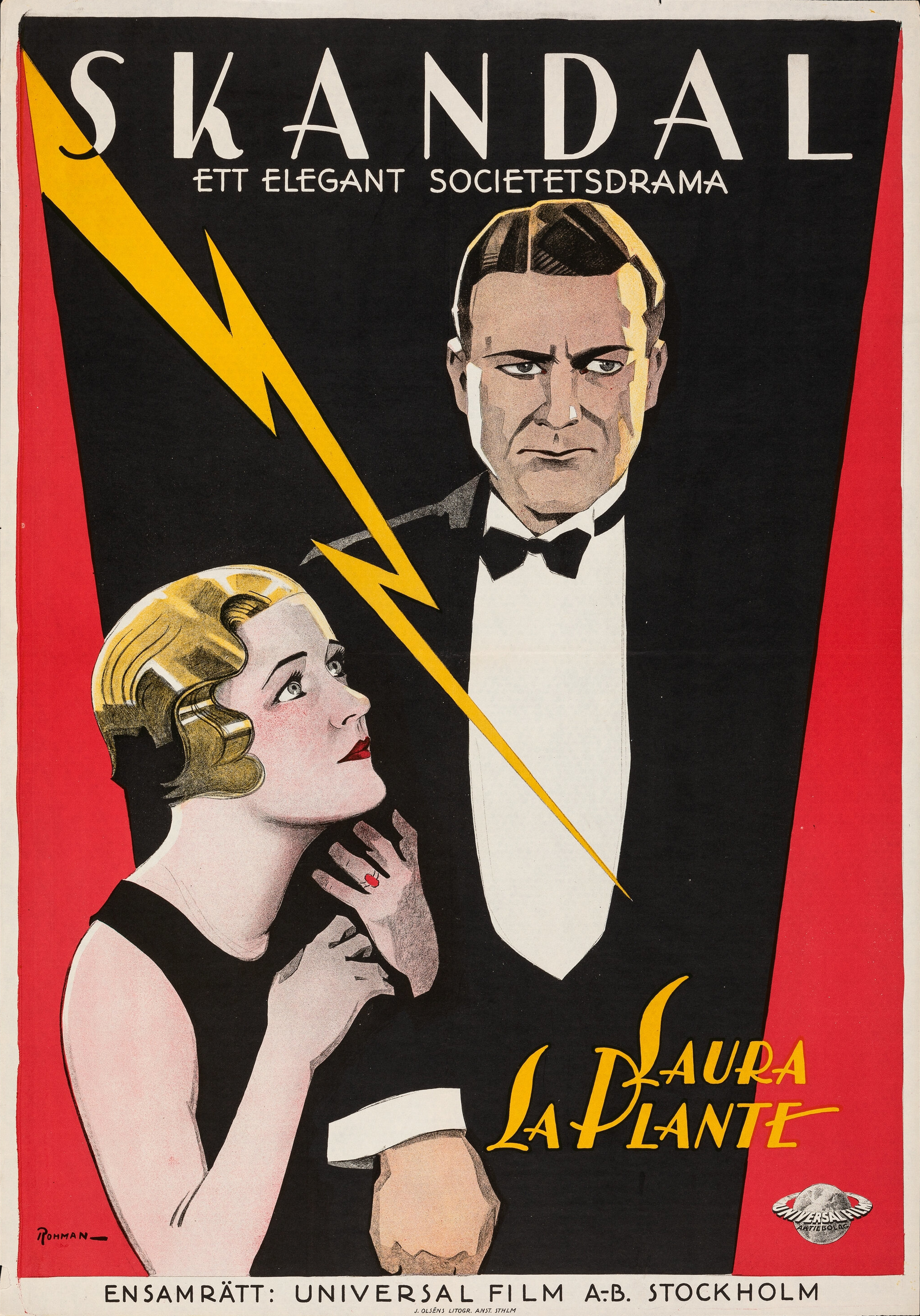
- Swedish theatrical release poster
- Directed by: Wesley Ruggles
- Screenplay by: Paul Schofield; Tom Reed; Walter Anthony
- Based on: The Haunted Lady by Adela Rogers St. Johns
- Produced by: Harry L. Decker
- Starring: Laura La Plante; Huntley Gordon; John Boles; Jane Winton; Julia Swayne Gordon; Eddie Phillips
- Cinematography: Gilbert Warrenton
- Edited by: Ray Curtiss; Maurice Pivar
- Production company: Universal Pictures
- Distributed by: Universal Pictures
- Release date: April 27, 1929
- Running time: 70 minutes
- Country: United States
- Languages: Sound (Part-Talkie) (English Intertitles)

Scandal is a 1929 American sound part-talkie drama film directed by Wesley Ruggles and written by Paul Schofield, Tom Reed and Walter Anthony. The film stars Laura La Plante, Huntley Gordon, John Boles, Jane Winton, Julia Swayne Gordon and Eddie Phillips. The film was released on April 27, 1929, by Universal Pictures.

== Cast ==
- Laura La Plante as Laura Hunt
- Huntley Gordon as Burke Innes
- John Boles as Maurice
- Jane Winton as Vera
- Julia Swayne Gordon as Mrs. Grant
- Eddie Phillips as Pancho
- Judith Barrett as Janet

== See also ==
- List of early sound feature films (1926–1929)
