= Footloose Widows =

1926 film

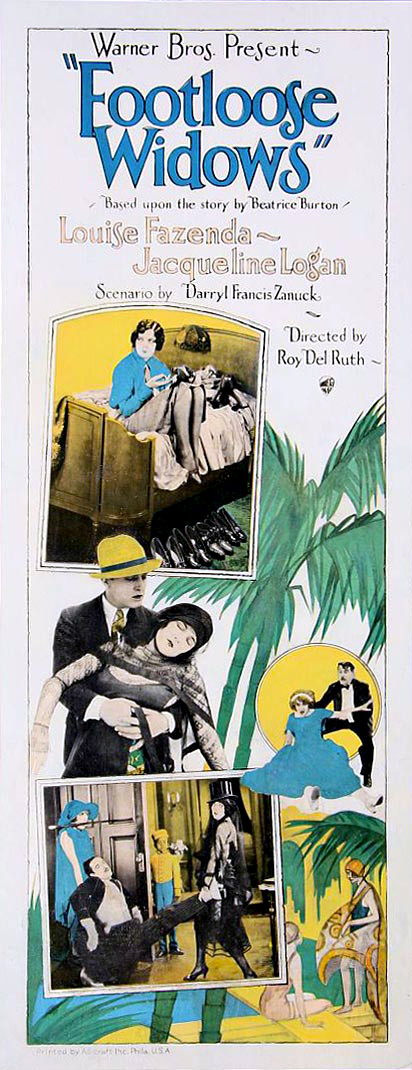
- Film poster
- Directed by: Roy Del Ruth; William McGann (ass't director)
- Written by: Darryl F. Zanuck; Roy Del Ruth (uncredited)
- Based on: Footloose by Beatrice Burton
- Starring: Louise Fazenda
- Cinematography: David Abel; Charles Van Enger
- Production company: Warner Bros.
- Distributed by: Warner Bros.
- Release date: June 19, 1926
- Running time: 70 minutes
- Country: United States
- Language: Silent (English intertitles)

Footloose Widows is a 1926 American silent comedy film produced and distributed by Warner Bros., directed by Roy Del Ruth, and starring Louise Fazenda and Jacqueline Logan. It involves two women who pretend to be rich widows in order to marry a man who is actually rich.

== Plot ==
Twenty-four year-old Marian is sad about being single and desires to meet a man she can fall in love with. Her roommate Flo encourages her instead to marry someone rich. They go to their work as fashion models and Marian showcases black clothes intended to be worn by a widow in mourning. Flo says that Marian "has it" while dressed in that way, being more attractive than her normal self. Marian's display gains the attention of department store owner Mr. Dunn who invites the two to his apartment. When Marian says they have nothing to wear, he gives them permission to borrow the department store's clothes for the evening. The two take as many clothes as they can, but instead of going to Dunn's apartment, Flo decides they'll go to Florida and pretend to be rich widows.

While in Florida, Flo overhears that millionaire J. A. Smith, inventor of a popular new soft drink called "Rush," will be staying at their hotel. She meets the ex-mayor who confirms that a well-dressed gentleman walking by is indeed J. A. Smith. Unbeknownst to Flo, there are two men with that name at the hotel and the one that Flo is pursuing is not the wealthy one. Flo arranges for Marian to get the man's attention by fainting into his arms as he comes by, but through a mistake, Marian falls into the arms of the wealthy J. A. Smith. She begins falling in love with him while Flo assumes he is a broke real-estate agent and discourages them.

After initially embarrassing the wrong J. A. Smith by knocking him unconscious, Flo slips a telegram into his hat that says Marian will receive half a million dollars from her late husband. Being broke himself, he decides to pursue Marian thinking that she is wealthy. He asks Marian about her late husband and, after she fakes tears to buy time, Flo concocts a tragic story in which Marian's late husband saw her being affectionate towards her brother that he had never met, assumed she was unfaithful, and shot himself. The story gains the sympathy of the wrong J. A. Smith and the ex-mayor. Meanwhile, the rich J. A. Smith meets with Marian and introduces himself as "Jerry," saying he is in a "moving business," which leads Marian to believe Flo is correct that he is poor.

Marian and the wrong J. A. Smith both have overdue hotel bills, so they decide to marry quickly in order to gain the other's supposed money. By chance, Mr. Dunn arrives and, seeing that Marian will be the bride, reveals the charade. Meanwhile, the assistant to Jerry tells Marian and Flo that his employer is leaving with a broken heart and is actually the rich J. A. Smith. After Mr. Dunn confronts Marian and Flo and demands they pay for the stolen clothes, the two escape and decide their only hope is for the rich J. A. Smith to fall for Marian again. Marian pretends to faint in front of his door, which is successful and the two declare their love for each other, and Flo reveals that she forged a letter saying that Marian didn't love him. However, Mr. Dunn arrives and tells Jerry that the two are gold diggers only interested in his money. Jerry nonetheless agrees to pay Mr. Dunn for the stolen clothes, then says goodbye to the pair.

Marian and Flo are despondent and begin discussing plans on what to do next. Flo encounters again the ex-mayor, who has been pestering her the whole time, and he says he can't stop thinking about her, so he wants to "marry her to forget her," astonishing Flo. Marian sullenly crosses paths with Jerry. While the two initially ignore each other, they turn back and rekindle their affections.

== Cast ==
- Louise Fazenda as Flo
- Jacqueline Logan as Marian
- Jason Robards, Sr. as Jerry
- Douglas Gerrard as Grover
- Neely Edwards as The Ex-Mayor
- Arthur Hoyt as Henry
- Jane Winton as Mrs. Drew
- Mack Swain as Ludwig, Marian's husband in retrospect
- John Miljan as Mr. Smith
- Eddie Phillips as "Tuxedo" Eddie
- Henry A. Barrows as Hotel Manager

== Preservation ==
A print of Footloose Widows is preserved in the Library of Congress collection. A 16mm copy is held at the Wisconsin Center for Film and Theater Research.
