= Lionel Braham =

British actor

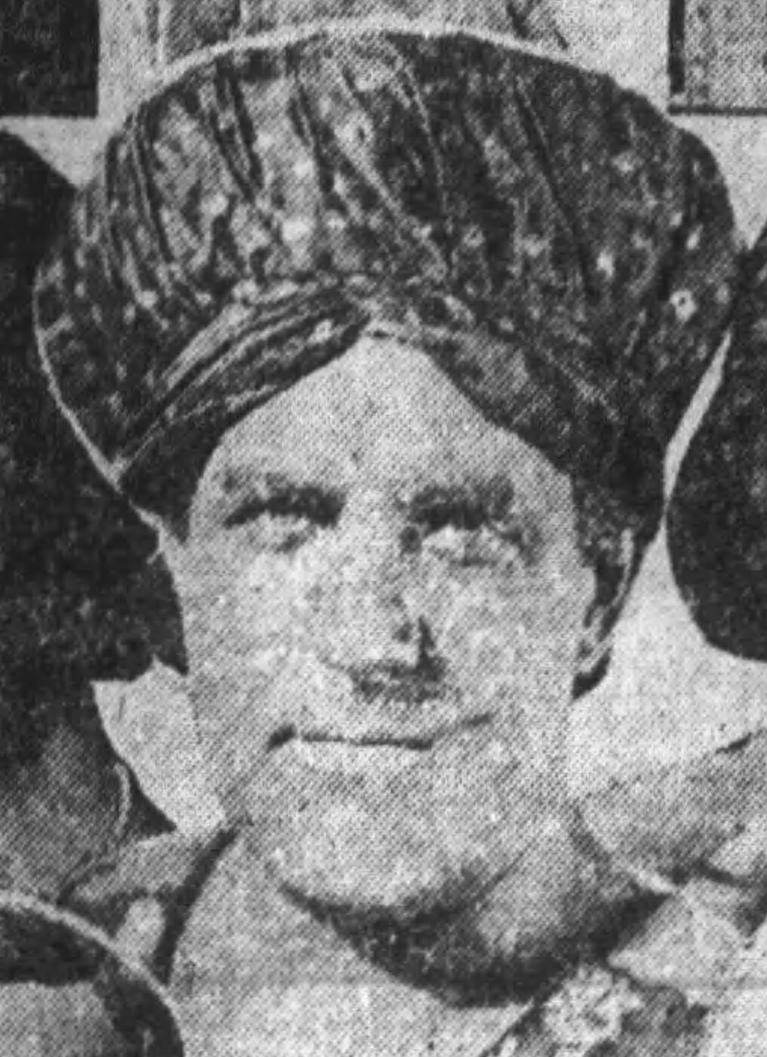
- Braham in a 1921 production of Mecca
- Born: April 1, 1879; Yorkshire, England, United Kingdom
- Died: October 6, 1947 (aged 68); Hollywood, Los Angeles, California, U.S.
- Occupation: Actor

Lionel Braham (April 1, 1879 – October 6, 1947) was a British actor. He appeared in the films Snow White, Young Lochinvar, I'll Show You the Town, Skinner's Dress Suit, Don Juan, As You Like It, Personal Property, The Prince and the Pauper, Wee Willie Winkie, Lord Jeff, A Christmas Carol, The Little Princess, I Dood It, The Song of Bernadette and Macbeth, among others.

Braham also played the role of Caliban in Percy MacKaye's production of the civic masque, Caliban by the Yellow Sands.

== Filmography ==
| Year | Title | Role | Notes |
|---|---|---|---|
| 1915 | The Battle Cry of Peace | The War Monster | Film debut |
| 1916 | Diana the Huntress | | |
| 1916 | The Shielding Shadow | The Bouncer | |
| 1916 | Snow White | Berthold the Huntsman | |
| 1923 | Young Lochinvar | Jamie the Ox | |
| 1925 | I'll Show You the Town | Frank Pemberton | |
| 1925 | The Wrestler | Strangler Stranski | |
| 1926 | Skinner's Dress Suit | Jackson | |
| 1926 | Don Juan | Duke Margoni | |
| 1927 | Out All Night | Officer | |
| 1927 | Night Life | War Profiteer | |
| 1936 | As You Like It | Charles - the Wrestler | |
| 1937 | Personal Property | Lord Carstairs | |
| 1937 | The Prince and the Pauper | Ruffler | |
| 1937 | Wee Willie Winkie | Maj. Gen. Hammond | |
| 1937 | The Hurricane | The Governor | Uncredited |
| 1938 | Lord Jeff | Constable | Uncredited |
| 1938 | A Christmas Carol | Spirit of Christmas Present | |
| 1939 | The Little Princess | Colonel | |
| 1943 | I Dood It | Mr. Gillingham | Uncredited |
| 1943 | The Song of Bernadette | Baron Massey | Uncredited |
| 1944 | Once Upon a Time | Weightlifter | Uncredited |
| 1944 | Our Hearts Were Young and Gay | Middle-Aged Englishman | Uncredited |
| 1946 | Two Sisters from Boston | Opera Singer | Uncredited |
| 1948 | Macbeth | Siward | Final film |
