= Jane Winton =

American actress (1905–1959)

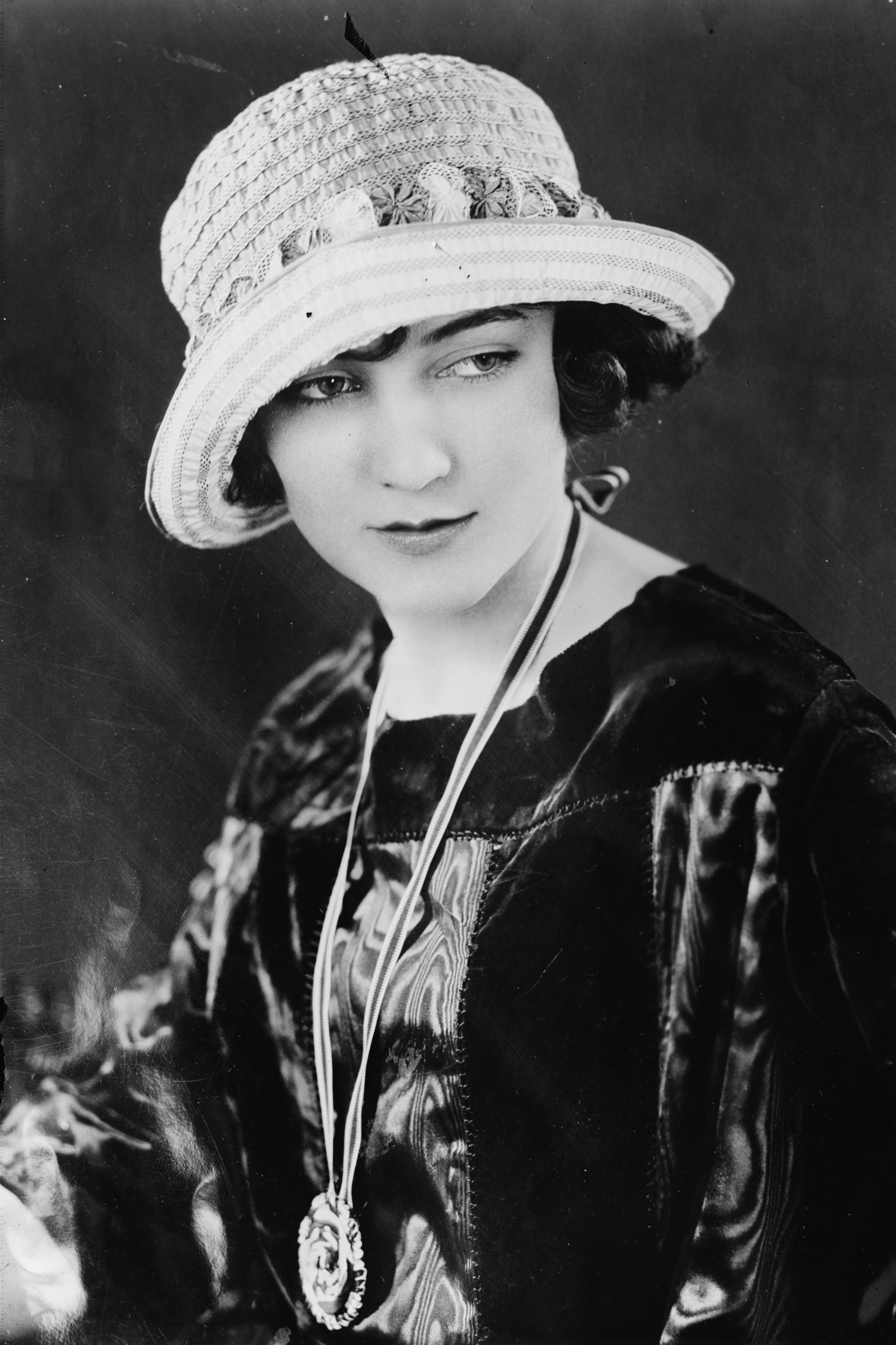
- Born: October 10, 1905; Philadelphia, Pennsylvania, U.S.
- Died: September 22, 1959 (aged 53); New York City, New York, U.S.
- Occupations: Actress, singer

Jane Winton (October 10, 1905 – September 22, 1959) was an American film actress, dancer, opera soprano, writer, and painter.

== Early years ==
Winton was born in Philadelphia, Pennsylvania, in 1905. The deaths of her father when she was four years old and her mother when she was six led to Winton's being "swapped back and forth among relatives, none of whom had proper funds to support her and therefore offered her more resentment than affection." Eventually, an elderly doctor who was a family friend adopted her and raised her in a strict environment. After she graduated from a finishing school in Connecticut, she ran away rather than enter Bryn Mawr College and become a doctor, which was her guardian's desire for her. She went to stay with a friend in New York City and was discovered there by producers Adolph Zukor and Jesse Lasky.

== Actress ==
During the 1920s, she began her stage career as a dancer with the Ziegfeld Follies. After coming to the West Coast, Winton became known as "the green-eyed goddess of Hollywood". Her film appearances include roles in Tomorrow's Love (1925), Why Girls Go Back Home (1926), Sunrise: A Song of Two Humans (1927), The Crystal Cup (1927), The Fair Co-Ed (1927), Burning Daylight (1928), Melody of Love (1928), and The Patsy (1928), Scandal (1929), Show Girl in Hollywood (1929), The Furies (1930), and Hell's Angels (1930).

Winton played Donna Isobel in Don Juan (1926). The film starred John Barrymore and Mary Astor. The movie was billed as the first film made in Vitaphone, an invention that synchronized sound with motion pictures. Modern sound pictures began with the Vitaphone.

== Opera and radio ==
After leaving Hollywood, Winton performed various operatic roles both in the United States and abroad. Her operatic debut came in 1933 when she performed as Nedda in the Brooklyn Academy of Music's production of Pagliacci. In 1933, she was with the National Grand Opera Company for its production of I Pagliacci. She sang Nedda. She starred in the operetta Caviar. In England, she became noted for her singing and for working in radio.

== Novelist ==
In 1951 Winton's novel Park Avenue Doctor was published. Passion Is the Gale was her second novel.

== Marriage ==
Winton married three times. In 1927, she wed Hollywood screenwriter Charles Kenyon. On July 17, 1930, she married broker Horace Gumble in Jersey City, New Jersey. Her last husband was Michael T. Gottlieb, a stockbroker, tournament contract bridge player, and Arizona property owner. They wed in 1935.

== Death ==
Winton died in 1959 at the Pierre Hotel in New York City from undisclosed causes. Her body was cremated, and her ashes were interred in the Riesner-Gottlieb Mausoleum in Temple Israel Cemetery, Hastings-on-Hudson, New York.

== Partial filmography ==
- Three Women (1924)
- Tomorrow's Love (1925)
- His Supreme Moment (1925)
- The Love Toy (1926)
- Why Girls Go Back Home (1926)
- My Old Dutch (1926)
- Footloose Widows (1926)
- Don Juan (1926)
- The Honeymoon Express (1926)
- Across the Pacific (1926)
- The Gay Old Bird (1927)
- Upstream (1927)
- The Monkey Talks (1927)
- The Beloved Rogue (1927)
- Sunrise: A Song of Two Humans (1927)
- Lonesome Ladies (1927)
- Perch of the Devil (1927)
- The Fair Co-Ed (1927)
- The Poor Nut (1927)
- Bare Knees (1928)
- Honeymoon Flats (1928)
- Nothing to Wear (1928)
- Burning Daylight (1928)
- The Patsy (1928)
- Yellow Lily (1928)
- Melody of Love (1928)
- Captain Lash (1929)
- Scandal (1929)
- The Bridge of San Luis Rey (1929)
- Show Girl in Hollywood (1930)
- A Notorious Affair (1930)
- Hell's Angels (1930)
- Hired Wife (1934)
- Limelight (1936)
