= Out All Night (1927 film) =

1927 film by William A. Seiter

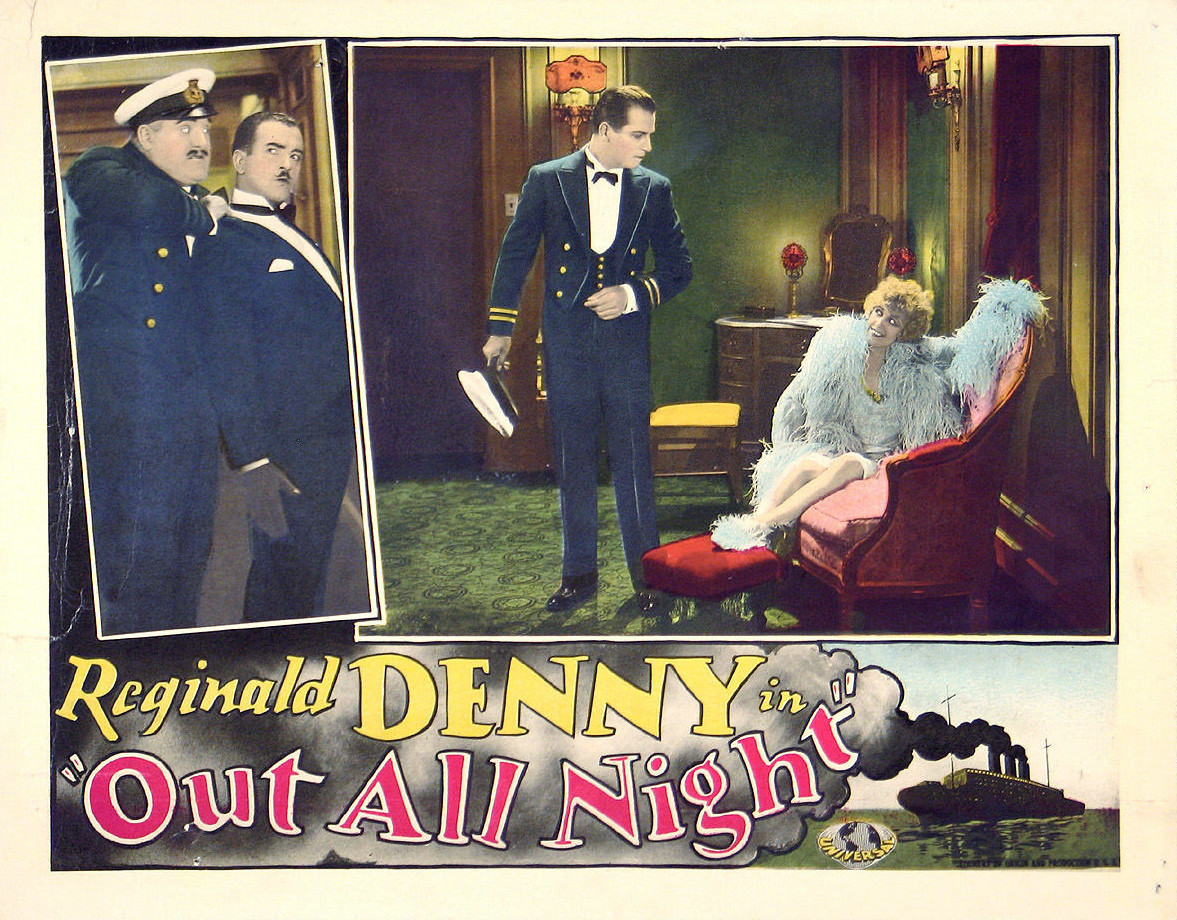
- Lobby card
- Directed by: William A. Seiter
- Written by: Charles Diltz (adaptation); Marcel Perez (adaptation); Tom Reed (titles); Harvey F. Thew
- Story by: Gladys Lehman
- Starring: Reginald Denny; Marian Nixon; Wheeler Oakman
- Cinematography: Arthur L. Todd
- Production company: Universal Pictures
- Distributed by: Universal Pictures
- Release date: 4 September 1927
- Running time: 60 minutes
- Country: United States
- Language: Silent (English intertitles)

Out All Night is a 1927 American silent comedy film directed by William A. Seiter and starring Reginald Denny, Marian Nixon, and Wheeler Oakman.

== Plot ==
As described in a film magazine, John Graham, wealthy young bachelor, falls in love with Molly O’Day, the leading lady in a current musical comedy. After failing to meet her at the theater, he runs across her in the automatic elevator of his apartment house. The elevator breaks down, and when it is repaired the next morning, John and Molly step out and into a taxi headed for the marriage license bureau. Shortly after the wedding, Molly discovers that a clause in her theater contract calls for the loss of $100,000 in case of marriage. They decide to keep the wedding a secret, and when Molly sails with the show for London that afternoon, John boards the boat as the ship's surgeon. They attempt ruse after ruse to be together, but are frustrated first by the Chief Officer, who had fallen for Molly himself, and then by Molly's roommate, Rose Lundy. John gets into all kinds of difficulties because of his shortcomings as a surgeon, which are climaxed when he attempts to treat the Captain for gout. In the meantime, the manager of the show troupe has proposed to Molly, and upon being told of the contract, tears it up. At this juncture John comes sliding down a ventilator, where he has been chased by the irate crew, right into Molly's stateroom. They embrace as the manager gazes ruefully at the torn bits of the contract floating around on the ocean.

== Cast ==
- Reginald Denny as John Graham
- Marian Nixon as Molly O'Day
- Wheeler Oakman as Kerrigan
- Dorothy Earle as Rose
- Dan Mason as Uncle
- Alfred Allen as Captain
- Robert Seiter as Purser
- Ben Hendricks Jr. as Dr. Allen
- Billy Franey as Taxi Driver
- Harry Tracy as Valet (credited as Harry Tracey)
- Lionel Braham as Lionel Braham

== Preservation ==
With no prints of Out All Night located in any film archives, it is a lost film.
