= The Blood Ship =

1927 film

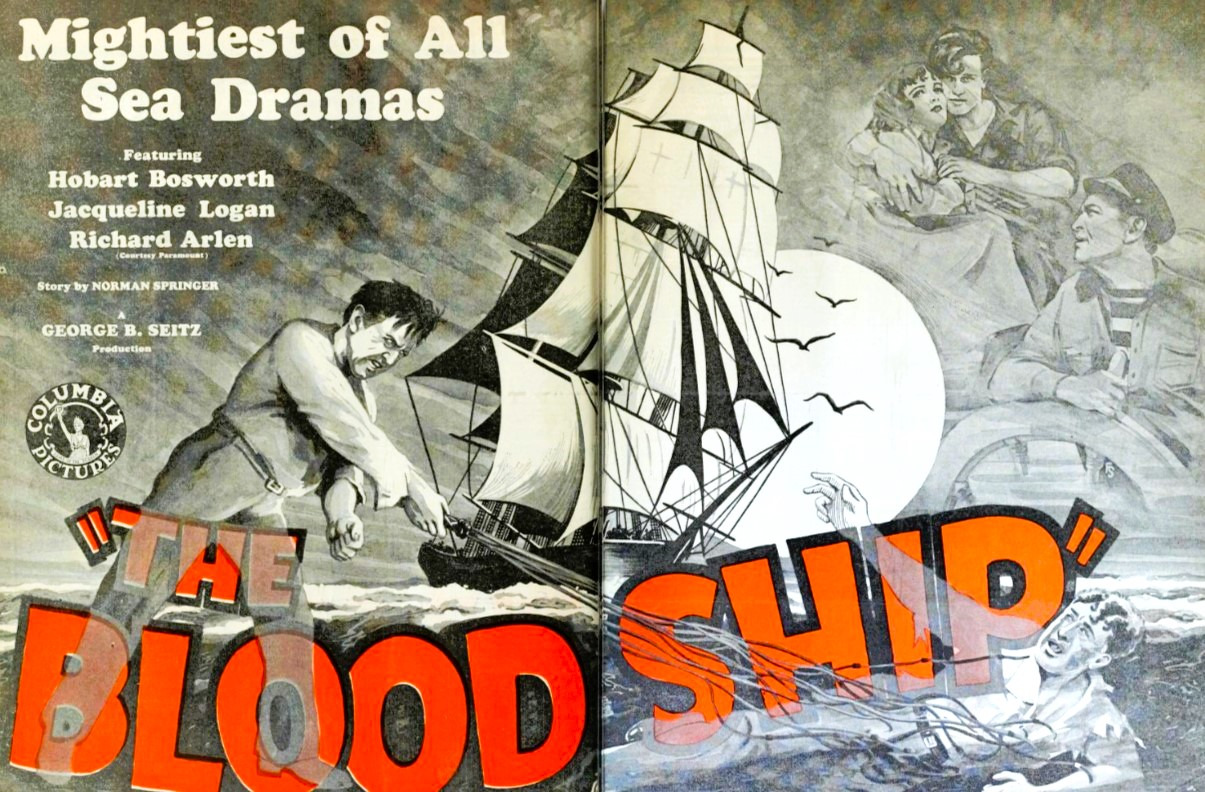
- Advertisement
- Directed by: George B. Seitz
- Written by: Fred Myton
- Based on: The Blood Ship by Norman Springer
- Produced by: Harry Cohn
- Starring: Hobart Bosworth; Jacqueline Logan; Richard Arlen
- Cinematography: Harry Davis; J.O. Taylor
- Edited by: Columbia Pictures
- Distributed by: Columbia Pictures
- Release date: July 18, 1927
- Running time: 7 reels
- Country: United States
- Language: Silent (English intertitles)

The Blood Ship is a 1927 American silent drama film directed by George B. Seitz and starring Hobart Bosworth, Jacqueline Logan, and Richard Arlen. It is based on the 1922 novel The Blood Ship by Norman Springer, which was later remade by Seitz as the 1931 sound film Shanghaied Love.

== Plot ==
A disgraced sea captain signs on as a hand on a cargo ship, which turns out to be captained by the tyrannical man who ruined his reputation. The other crewmen have mostly been shanghaied aboard and are kept in line by the captain and his brutal first mate. The former captain begins to plot a mutiny to take control of the ship from their brutal regime.

== Cast ==
- Hobart Bosworth as Jim Newman
- Jacqueline Logan as Mary Swope Newman
- Richard Arlen as John Shreve
- Walter James as Capt. Angus Swope
- Fred Kohler as First Mate Fitz
- James Bradbury Sr. as The Knitting Swede
- Arthur Rankin as Nils
- Syd Crossley as Cockney Bouncer
- Frank Hemphill as Second Mate
- Chappell Dossett as Rev. Richard Deaken
- Blue Washington as Negro

== Preservation ==
The seventh and final reel of the film was thought to be lost until 2007. The final reel was ultimately found and the film was screened in its entirety on October 11, 2007. The Blood Ship was preserved by the Academy Film Archive, in conjunction with Sony Pictures, in 2007.

== Bibliography ==
- Goble, Alan. The Complete Index to Literary Sources in Film. Walter de Gruyter, 1999.
