= The River Woman =

1928 film by Joseph Henabery

- Directed by: Joseph Henabery
- Written by: Harold Shumate (story, dialogue); Adele Buffington (adaptation, scenario)
- Produced by: Gotham Productions
- Starring: Lionel Barrymore; Jacqueline Logan
- Cinematography: Ray June
- Edited by: Donn Hayes
- Production company: Gotham Pictures
- Distributed by: Lumas Film; States Rights
- Release date: December 1, 1928
- Running time: 7 reels; 6,565 feet
- Country: United States
- Languages: Sound (part-talkie) (English intertitles)

The River Woman is a 1928 American sound part-talkie drama film directed by Joseph Henabery. In addition to sequences with audible dialogue or talking sequences, the film features a synchronized musical score and sound effects along with English intertitles. The soundtrack was recorded using a sound-on-disc system. Made by an independent company, Gotham, the film starred Lionel Barrymore and Jacqueline Logan.

== Plot ==
On the muddy banks of the restless Mississippi stands Lefty's Landing, a levee-front saloon presided over by its iron-fisted founder, Bill Lefty (Lionel Barrymore). Feared, respected, and fair to a fault, Lefty is a river legend — a man who carved his empire from river mud and whisky. Sharing his roost is the mysterious and magnetic Duchess (Jacqueline Logan), hostess of the saloon and queen of the waterfront, who beguiles the nightly crowds with her beauty, her wit — and her aloofness. She belongs to no man, and yet Bill silently carries a torch for her.

When the Duchess asks to go shopping up-river, Lefty quietly hands her a roll of bills. Aboard the Colusa, she rescues a helpless drunk from a pickpocket — and soon catches the eye of Jim Henderson (Charles Delaney), a young and earnest stoker on his first river voyage. When a sudden downpour soaks her while saving a child's doll, Jim offers her shelter in the engine room. She playfully claims to be a schoolteacher buying books. Smitten by his respectful innocence, she slips away at the next stop, but he later learns the truth — she's the most notorious woman on the riverfront.

Back at the saloon, Bill becomes increasingly concerned. News reaches him that Pug Ryan, a vicious thug once jailed by the Duchess's testimony, has been released and is gunning for revenge. Bill keeps the threat from her, but when she returns flaunting gaudy clothes from her trip, he finally loses control — declares his love and proposes. The Duchess, startled and torn, hesitates. Though she respects Bill, her heart recalls the clean gaze of the young stoker.

The river swells with the worst rain in years. On a subsequent stop, Jim returns to Lefty's Landing with a crew of mates and Sally (Mary Doran), the fiery girl of rival saloon owner Mulatto Mike (Sheldon Lewis). To provoke the Duchess, Jim flirts openly with Sal. The Duchess retaliates by dancing with a longshoreman, but Jim seizes the room's attention with a surprising talent — he plays the battered saloon piano with the grace of a trained musician.

Mulatto Mike storms in and sees Sal draped over Jim. A brutal fight erupts. Side by side, Bill and Jim brawl with the gang. Jim is knocked unconscious in the melee, and Bill, impressed by the kid's mettle, carries him upstairs. Late that night, the Duchess, drawn by feelings she dares not name, creeps into Jim's room — only to nearly be caught by Bill, clutching a stolen diamond he'd meant as a gift for her.

Come morning, the rain has overwhelmed the levees. As floodwaters rise, Bill and his faithful old janitor, the Scrub (Harry Todd), sandbag the entrance. Jim confronts the Duchess about her nighttime visit; she denies it angrily, afraid of her deepening love. To keep Jim nearby, Bill offers him a job as saloon pianist — the river's too dangerous for boats now. Cramped quarters and tension rise as business moves upstairs. Bill begins to suspect the truth between Jim and the Duchess.

The Duchess, tormented, confides in the Scrub. “Take happiness when it comes,” he tells her.

Trouble brews again — Ryan is coming. Bill arms himself for the showdown. Meanwhile, Jim presses the Duchess to face the truth: she loves him. At last, she admits it, and Jim sets off through the flood in a rowboat to buy train tickets and start a new life with her — clean and free.

While he's gone, Ryan arrives. A vicious fight breaks out, ending with Ryan shot dead, his body swallowed by the rising water. Bill, terrified of the law, drags the body away and vanishes into the flood.

Believing Bill has murdered for her, the Duchess resolves to marry him — out of guilt and gratitude. But when Jim returns, dripping wet, with the tickets in hand, the truth can no longer be hidden.

In the decaying saloon, as the waters churn below and debris crashes around them, the three confront their fates. Bill, gruff and broken-hearted, rages at the betrayal — then relents. In a final act of self-sacrifice, he releases his claim on the woman he loves. As the building begins to collapse, he urges them to flee. Jim tries to save him, but is nearly killed. With a thunderous crash, the saloon crumbles — and Bill is buried in the ruins, going down with the empire he built.

As the storm breaks and the waters begin to fall, Jim and the Duchess stand together — ragged, soaked, but free — ready to begin a new life far from the river that ruled them all.

== Cast ==
- Lionel Barrymore as Bill Lefty
- Jacqueline Logan as The Duchess
- Charles Delaney as Jim Henderson
- Sheldon Lewis as Mulatto Mike
- Harry Todd as The Scrub
- Mary Doran as Sally

== Preservation ==
Prints of The River Woman are preserved at the Library of Congress, Cinematek, George Eastman Museum, BFI National Archive, and UCLA Film & Television Archive.

== See also ==
- Lionel Barrymore filmography
- List of early sound feature films (1926–1929)
