= Playing with Souls =

1925 film by Ralph Ince

- Directed by: Ralph Ince
- Written by: Countess De Chambrun (story); C. Gardner Sullivan
- Starring: Jacqueline Logan; Mary Astor; Clive Brook
- Cinematography: Hal Mohr
- Production company: Thomas H. Ince Corporation
- Distributed by: First National Pictures
- Release date: April 30, 1925
- Running time: 7 reels
- Country: United States
- Language: Silent (English intertitles)

Playing with Souls is a 1925 American silent drama film directed by Ralph Ince and starring Jacqueline Logan, Mary Astor, and Clive Brook.

== Plot ==
As described in a film magazine review, Matthew Hale and his irresponsible wife separate. Hale gives his wife control of their son until he is of age. She places him in a French school while she wanders about the continent, having a gay time. He is so lonely for her that he writes letters to himself. At twenty, forsaken of both parents, he leaves school and Margo, the young woman he loves, goes to Paris to find out about his father. The agent knows nothing and Matt decides to go to the dogs, falls a victim to Bricotte, a dancer in a cheap music hall. His father comes, unknown to Matt, wins Bricotte away from him. Out of funds, Matt forges his father’s name, and later jumping into the Seine. His father rescues him; they are reconciled and the young woman he loves comes to him.

== Cast ==
- Jacqueline Logan as Bricotte
- Mary Astor as Margo
- Belle Bennett as Amy Dale
- Clive Brook as Matthew Dale Sr.
- William Collier Jr. as Matthew Dale Jr.
- Jessie Arnold as Louise
- Marion Feducha as Matthew Dale Jr. - age 13
- Helen Hoge as Matthew Dale Jr., age 4
- Josef Swickard as Monsieur Jomier
- Bernard Berger as Boy
- Mathilde Comont as Brothel Worker
- Louise Emmons as Undetermined Secondary Role
- Kenneth Johnson as French Boy
- Charles Hill Mailes as Undetermined Secondary Role

== Preservation ==
With no prints of Playing with Souls located in any film archives, it is considered a lost film.

== Bibliography ==
- Goble, Alan. The Complete Index to Literary Sources in Film. Walter de Gruyter, 1999.
