= Flaming Barriers =

1924 film by George Melford

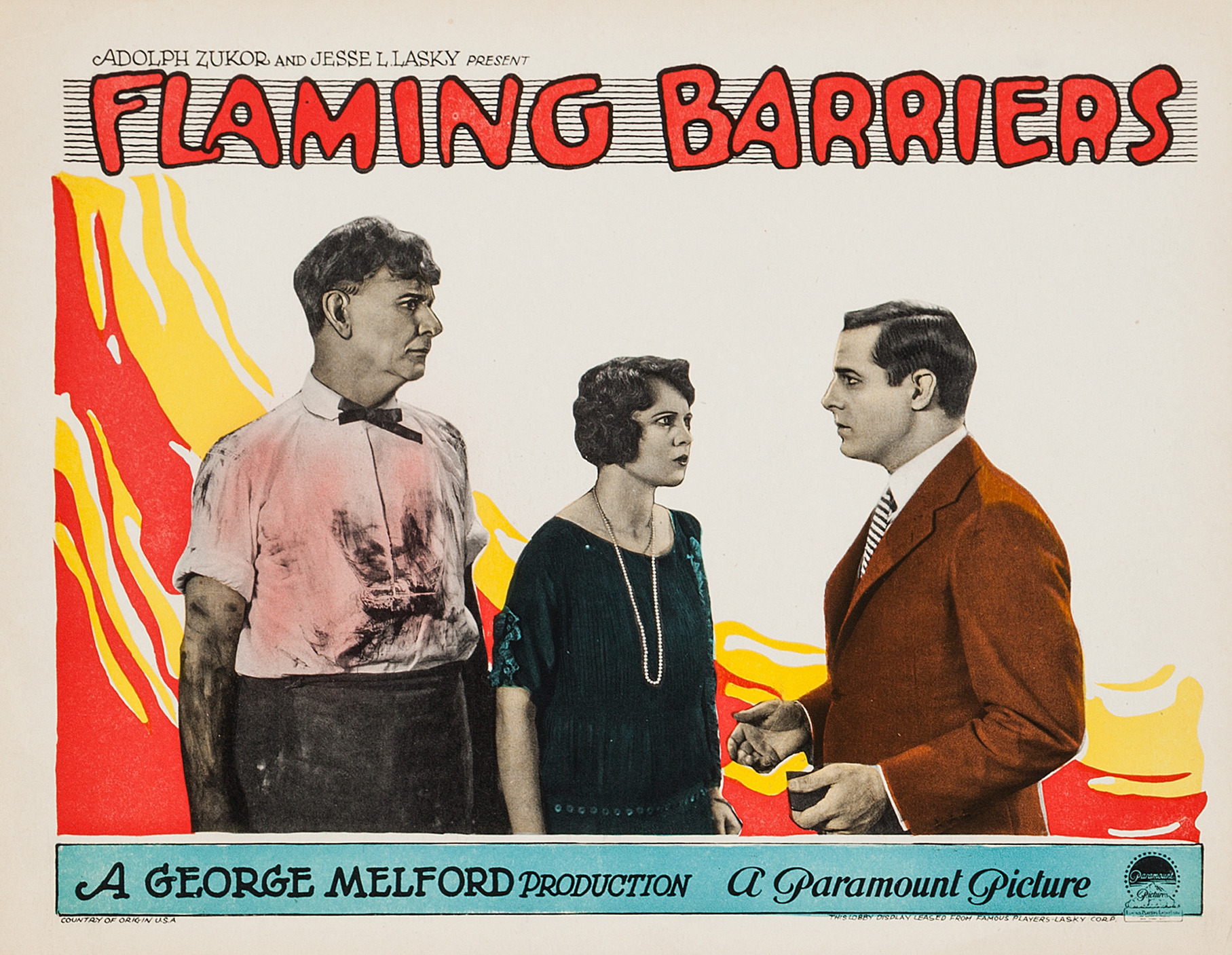
- Lobby card
- Directed by: George Melford
- Screenplay by: Byron Morgan; Harvey F. Thew
- Produced by: Jesse L. Lasky; Adolph Zukor
- Starring: Jacqueline Logan; Antonio Moreno; Walter Hiers; Charles Stanton Ogle; Robert McKim
- Cinematography: Charles G. Clarke
- Production company: Famous Players–Lasky Corporation
- Distributed by: Paramount Pictures
- Release date: January 27, 1924
- Running time: 60 minutes
- Country: United States
- Language: Silent (English intertitles)

Flaming Barriers is a 1924 American silent drama film directed by George Melford and written by Byron Morgan and Harvey F. Thew. The film stars Jacqueline Logan, Antonio Moreno, Walter Hiers, Charles Stanton Ogle, Robert McKim, Luke Cosgrave, and Warren Rogers. The film was released on January 27, 1924, by Paramount Pictures.

== Plot ==
As described in a film magazine review, Joseph Pickens, a leading citizen of Burbridge, plans to control the invention of a fast motor fire truck, which old Patrick Malone is exploiting. Young Sam Barton comes to Malone's machine shop to work as an efficiency man. Sam falls in love with Malone's daughter Jerry and they have several adventures together. When a forest fire threatens Burbridge, Sam and Jerry drive the fire truck through the flames to save the town. Malone's invention brings him riches, the scheme of Pickens is defeated, and Sam wins the affections of Jerry.

== Cast ==
- Jacqueline Logan as Jerry Malone
- Antonio Moreno as Sam Barton
- Walter Hiers as Henry Van Sickle
- Charles Stanton Ogle as Patrick Malone
- Robert McKim as Joseph Pickens
- Luke Cosgrave as Bill O'Halloran
- Warren Rogers as Mayor Steers
- Claribel Campbell

== Preservation ==
With no prints of Flaming Barriers located in any film archives, it is a lost film.
