= Harvey F. Thew =

American screenwriter

- likely Thew, very young, ca. 1901
- Born: Harvey Francis Thew; July 4, 1883; Vernon Center, Minnesota, US
- Died: November 6, 1946 (aged 63); Los Angeles, California, US
- Occupation: Screenwriter

Harvey Francis Thew was a screenwriter in the United States. He worked mostly with Warner Bros. and wrote dozens of screenplays, often as part of a writing team. Some of his screenplays were adaptations. He also worked for MGM and Paramount. He was born in Vernon Center, Minnesota. He died in Los Angeles.

== Partial filmography ==
- The Years of the Locust (1916), co-wrote screenplay
- The Big Sister (1916)
- The American Consul (1917)
- Rimrock Jones (1918)
- The Shuttle (1918)
- The Scarlet Shadow (1919)
- What Am I Bid? (1919)
- Under Crimson Skies (1920)
- The Romance Promoters (1920)
- Just Outside the Door (1921)
- Flaming Barriers (1924), co-wrote screenplay
- Oh, Doctor! (1925)
- Raffles, the Amateur Cracksman (1925)
- The Mad Whirl (1925)
- I'll Show You the Town (1925)
- Siege (1925)
- Take It from Me (1926)
- The Cheerful Fraud (1927)
- Out All Night (1927)
- Three-Ring Marriage (1928)
- The Street of Illusion (1928)
- Give and Take (1928)
- Love in the Desert (1929)
- The Sacred Flame (1929)
- Playing Around (1930)
- The Man From Blankley's (1930)
- The Matrimonial Bed (1930)
- Divorce Among Friends (1930)
- The Mad Genius (1931)
- The Public Enemy (1931)
- The Woman from Monte Carlo (1932)
- The Famous Ferguson Case (1932)
- Two Seconds (1932)
- Silver Dollar (1932)
- Supernatural (1933)
- She Done Him Wrong (1933), adapted from Diamond Lil for Paramount
- Terror Aboard (1933)
- Bedside (1934)
- Operator 13 (1934)
- Murder in the Private Car (1934)
- Death on the Diamond (1934)
- The Trail of the Lonesome Pine (1936)
- Dudes Are Pretty People (1942)
- Confessions of a Vice Baron (1943)
