= Lonesome Ladies =

1927 film

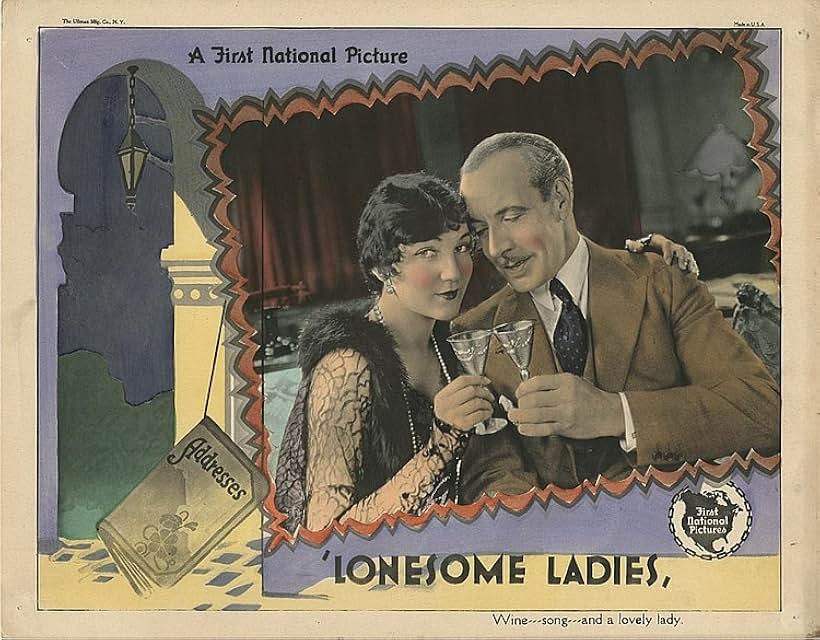
- Theatrical release poster
- Directed by: Joseph Henabery
- Screenplay by: Winifred Dunn
- Story by: Lenore Coffee
- Produced by: Ray Rockett
- Starring: Lewis Stone; Anna Q. Nilsson; Jane Winton; Doris Lloyd; Edward Martindel; Fritzi Ridgeway
- Cinematography: Al Green; Sol Polito
- Production company: First National Pictures
- Distributed by: First National Pictures
- Release date: July 3, 1927
- Running time: 60 minutes
- Country: United States
- Language: English

Lonesome Ladies is a 1927 American comedy film directed by Joseph Henabery and written by Winifred Dunn. The film stars Lewis Stone, Anna Q. Nilsson, Jane Winton, Doris Lloyd, Edward Martindel and Fritzi Ridgeway. The film was released on July 3, 1927, by First National Pictures.

== Cast ==
- Lewis Stone as John Fosdick
- Anna Q. Nilsson as Polly Fosdick
- Jane Winton as Mrs. St. Clair
- Doris Lloyd as Helen Wayne
- Edward Martindel as Motley Hunter
- Fritzi Ridgeway as Dorothy
- De Sacia Mooers as Bee
- E. H. Calvert as Mr. Burton
- Grace Carlyle as Mrs. Burton
- Fred Warren as Butler

== Preservation ==
Lonesome Ladies is currently presumed lost. In February of 2021, the film was cited by the National Film Preservation Board on their Lost U.S. Silent Feature Films list.
