= I'll Show You the Town =

1925 film

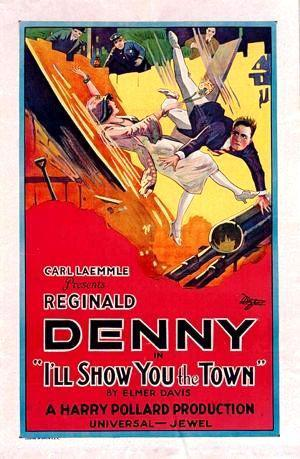
- Theatrical release poster
- Directed by: Harry A. Pollard
- Screenplay by: Raymond L. Schrock (scenario); Harvey F. Thew (titles)
- Based on: I'll Show You the Town by Elmer Davis
- Starring: Reginald Denny; Marian Nixon; Edward Kimball; Lilyan Tashman; Hayden Stevenson; Cissy Fitzgerald
- Cinematography: Charles J. Stumar
- Production company: Universal Pictures
- Distributed by: Universal Pictures
- Release date: June 7, 1925
- Running time: 80 minutes
- Country: United States
- Language: Silent (English intertitles)

I'll Show You the Town is a 1925 American silent comedy film directed by Harry A. Pollard and written by Raymond L. Schrock and Harvey F. Thew. It is based on the 1924 novel I'll Show You the Town by Elmer Davis. The film stars Reginald Denny, Marian Nixon, Edward Kimball, Lilyan Tashman, Hayden Stevenson, and Cissy Fitzgerald. The film was released on June 7, 1925, by Universal Pictures.

== Plot ==
As described in a film magazine, a bothersome neighbor tries to palm his wife off on professor Alec Dupree, who has a reputation for being "safe and dependable," for an evening at the Hanging Gardens Cafe. He objects on the grounds that he is writing a book, but the neighbor leaves, assuming his assent. The Dean of Wyndham College, which was founded by an ancestor of Dupree, is distressed over the financial plight of the school, and goes to the young professor for aid. He tells him that Agnes Clevenger, a wealthy widow who makes annual gifts to the college, is being lured away by New York charities and that the college is in danger of being left flat. Dupree is beguiled by a gay party in the next apartment into having a few drinks and meets the widow Clevenger, who is in conference with some charitable organizations. Addressing her as Aggie, he drags her into the hall for a private chat, flatters her by calling her beautiful, and makes a date to show her the town in half an hour. His cousin Edith tells him that a young woman from the West named Hazel will be arriving, but he wants nothing to do with her until he sees her. He then insists on taking her out, just as soon as he is finished with the widow. He takes the widow around the town using an airplane, and then returns home to change. While he is dressing, a childhood sweetheart who has run away from her husband comes to him for refuge. He tells her to leave his apartment, and then he is dragged to the Hanging Garden by his neighbor's wife Fran. As soon as they are seated, he goes to the telephone and meets the widow Clevenger, who insists on being taken to the Hanging Gardens. They are seated and he orders dinner, and then leaves on some pretext, and runs into Fran and her mother, who ask him to join them. He is in love with the young woman so cannot miss this opportunity, so he orders some soup and then excuses himself to go and use the telephone. By instructing a bellboy to page him every five minutes, he is able to spend time with each of the women without letting them know of the other two. The runaway wife's husband Frank arrives with murder in his eyes and goes stalking for Dupree. The two younger women leave him in disgust and he gets rid of the widow. He returns home to find the runaway wife Lucille in his bathtub. Angry at her, he leaves her to his apartment and goes in his pajamas to get some sleep at a neighbor's, but is called back to the phone in his apartment just as the angry husband arrives and bangs on his door. He carries Lucille to Fran's apartment and puts her into bed, and then faces the wild husband with a show of innocence. Fran comes in, sees the strange woman in her bed, and rushes to Dupree for sympathy and falls into his arms. She is followed by her husband who sees them in an embrace. To finish it, Hazel and the widow also arrive at the apartment. Faced with two outraged husbands, the professor turns into a cave man, and puts everyone into their place with an iron hand. He then drags Hazel to his apartment and orders her to kiss him. She accepts his proposal of marriage, and the widow decides to give two million dollars to the college.

== Cast ==
- Reginald Denny as Alec Dupree
- Marian Nixon as Hazel Deming
- Edward Kimball as Prof. Carlyle McCabe
- Lilyan Tashman as Fan Green
- Hayden Stevenson as Martin Green
- Cissy Fitzgerald as Agnes Clevenger
- Margaret Livingston as Lucille Pemberton
- Neely Edwards as Billie Bonner
- William A. Carroll as Professor Goodhuee
- Martha Mattox as Aunt Sarah
- Helen Greene as Edith Torey
- Lionel Braham as Frank Pemberton
- Carrie Daumery as Society Matron (uncredited)
- Vincent Rose as Pianist (uncredited)
- Rolfe Sedan as Masher (uncredited)
- Jackie Taylor as Violinist/Orchestra Leader (uncredited)

== Release and preservation ==
I'll Show You the Town is preserved at the Cinematheque Royale de Belgique, Brussels.

It was the first film ever shown at the Stanford Theatre in Palo Alto, California, premiering on June 9, 1925. Reginald Denny, the star of the film, made a personal appearance at the first show. The restored film has since been programmed at the theater several times during the 21st century, sometimes on a double bill with another Denny vehicle, That's My Daddy (1927). A double feature screening of That's My Daddy and I'll Show You the Town was run at the Stanford on June 9, 2025, to honor the theatre's hundredth year of operation; Denny's granddaughter, Kimberly Pucci, was in attendance.
