= A Perfect Crime (film) =

1921 film by Allan Dwan

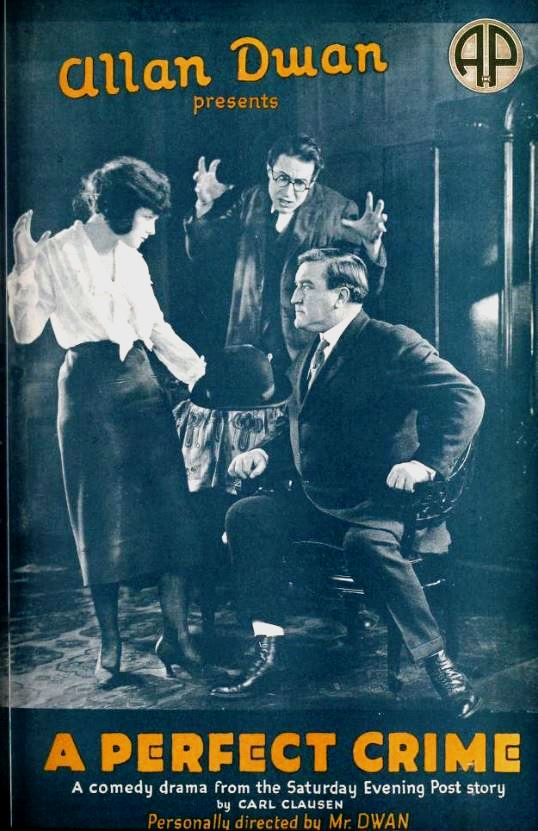
- Advertisement
- Directed by: Allan Dwan
- Screenplay by: Allan Dwan
- Story by: Carl Clausen
- Based on: "The Perfect Crime", short story in The Saturday Evening Post
- Produced by: Allan Dwan; Mack Sennett
- Starring: Monte Blue; Jacqueline Logan; Stanton Heck; Hardee Kirkland; Carole Lombard
- Cinematography: H. Lyman Broening
- Production company: Allan Dwan Productions
- Distributed by: Associated Producers
- Release date: March 5, 1921 (U.S.)
- Running time: 5 reels
- Country: United States
- Language: Silent (English intertitles)

A Perfect Crime is a 1921 American silent comedy-drama film directed by Allan Dwan and starring Monte Blue, Jacqueline Logan, Stanton Heck, Hardee Kirkland, and Carole Lombard. It was Logan and Lombard's feature film debut. Lombard was credited as Jane Peters at the time. It is not known whether the film survives, which suggests it may be lost.

Based on a short story published in The Saturday Evening Post on September 25, 1920, by Carl Clausen, the movie concerns the life of bank messenger Wally Griggs and his vastly different alter ego James Brown.

== Plot ==
A mild-mannered bank messenger named Wally Griggs lives a double life as James Brown, a wild and rakish adventurer. He catches the eye of bank president Halliday, curious about his exploits, and of his coworker and only friend Mary, who is romantically interested in him.

Mary lost her fortune after trusting a swindler named "Big Bill" Thaine, who is now a district attorney determined to marry her despite her reluctance. Wally decides to steal money from the bank, leading to his arrest by Thaine. He sues for false imprisonment and in the process manages to win back Mary's money. He then returns the stolen bank bonds while faking amnesia. (Note: In some sources, Wally is said to suffer from aphasia. However, he is able to explain what happened to him, while the main symptom of aphasia is an inability to comprehend or formulate language. Instead, he alleges memory issues indicative of amnesia, which is how his condition is interpreted in other sources.)

A publisher, intrigued by Wally's tales about his life as James Brown, offers him a book deal. Making enough money to support himself as an author, Wally quits his job and marries Mary.

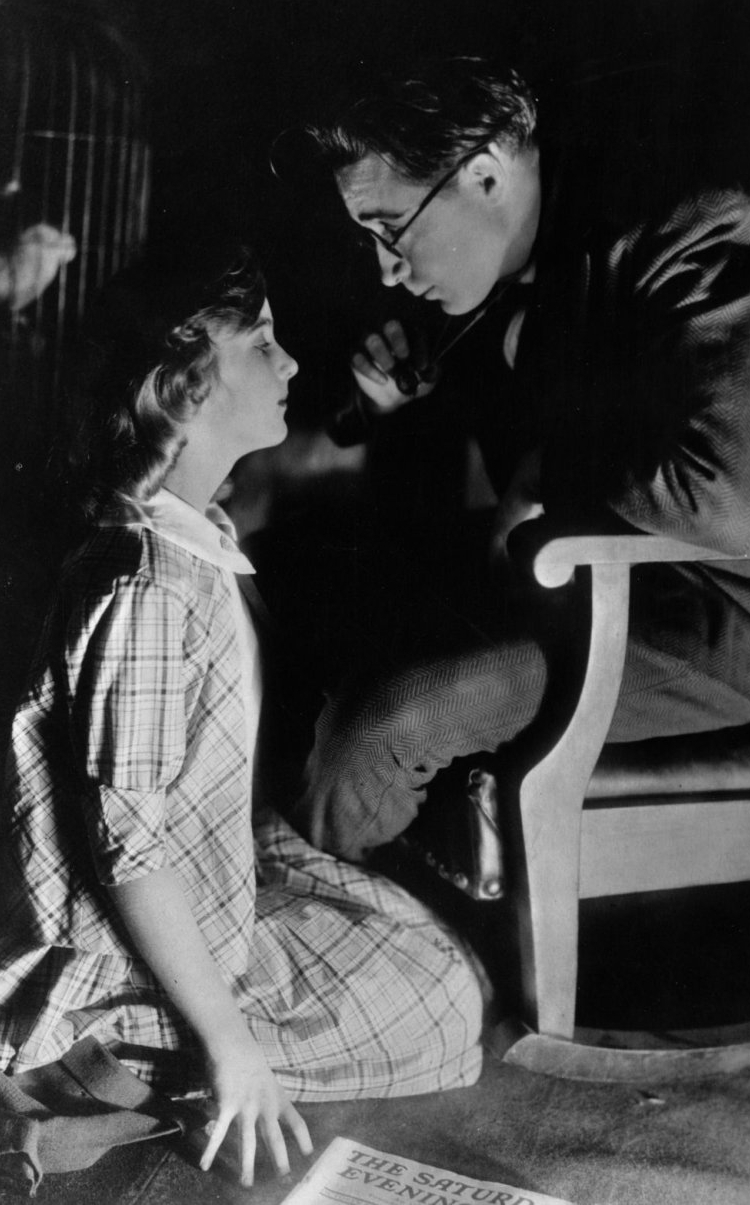
A twelve-year-old Carole Lombard (then known by her birth name Jane Peters) in her film debut as Grigg's sister

== Cast ==
- Monte Blue as Wally Griggs
- Jacqueline Logan as Mary Oliver
- Stanton Heck as "Big Bill" Thaine
- Hardee Kirkland as President Halliday
- Jane Peters (Carole Lombard) as Griggs's Sister

== Reception ==
The movie was positively received in the press.

== Bibliography ==
- Gehring, Wes D. (2003). Carole Lombard, the Hoosier Tornado. Indiana Historical Society Press.
