= Java Head (1923 film) =

1923 film by George Melford

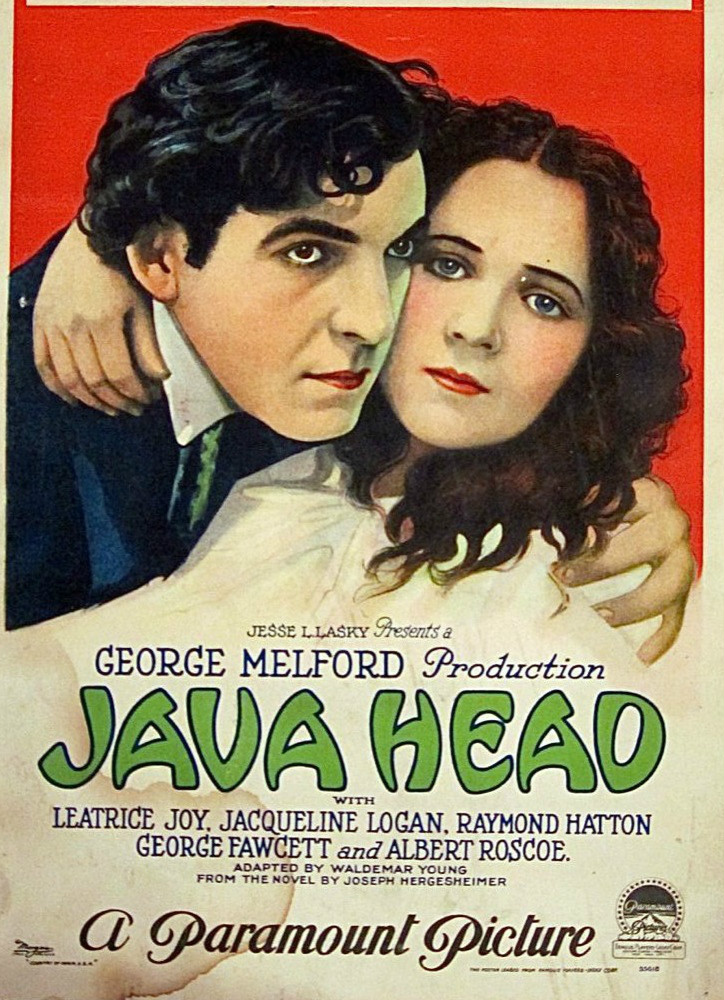
- Lobby poster
- Directed by: George Melford
- Story by: Waldemar Young (story and adaptation)
- Based on: Java Head by Joseph Hergesheimer
- Starring: Leatrice Joy; Jacqueline Logan; Alan Roscoe
- Cinematography: Bert Glennon; Charles G. Clarke
- Production company: Famous Players–Lasky
- Distributed by: Paramount Pictures
- Release date: January 28, 1923 (U.S.)
- Running time: 80 minutes
- Country: United States
- Language: Silent (English intertitles)
- Budget: 200,000

Java Head is a 1923 American silent romantic drama film directed by George Melford and starring Leatrice Joy, Jacqueline Logan, Frederick Strong, Alan Roscoe, and Betty Bronson in a bit part. It is based on a popular novel of the same name by Joseph Hergesheimer, which in turn is named after the geographical feature.

Java Head was remade in a 1934 British sound film starring Anna May Wong which was released by Associated Talking Pictures.

== Plot ==
As described in a film magazine, during the late 1840s wealthy retired sea captain Jeremy Ammidon lives with his children and grandchildren in a house known as "Java Head" in Salem, Massachusetts. Jeremy's son William manages the family business. Gerrit Ammidon, skipper of the Nautilus in its oriental trade, loves Nettie Vollar, a granddaughter of Barzil Dunsack, an enemy of Jeremy. Barzil orders Gerrit out of his house. In China, Gerrit rescues Taou Yuen from a gang of ruffians. Her father, a Manchu noble, orders the two to be wed or slain. Gerrit marries Taou and brings her to Salem where her appearance causes consternation among the Ammidon family and Nettie to become ill. Edward Dunsack, a drug addict, is fascinated by Taou and tries to turn her mind against Gerrit. Edward tells her that Gerrit loves Nettie, whom she has seen at a party, but Taou repulses him. Nettie learns that Gerrit still loves her and is visited by Taou, who then takes an overdose of opium and dies. Nettie and Gerrit are wed and sail away on the Nautilus.

== Cast ==
- Leatrice Joy as Taou Yuen
- Jacqueline Logan as Nettie Vollar
- Frederick Strong as Jeremy Ammidon
- Alan Roscoe as Gerrit Ammidon (probably credited as Albert Roscoe)
- Arthur Stuart Hall as William Ammidon
- Rose Tapley as Rhoda Ammidon
- Violet Axzelle as Laurel Ammidon
- Audrey Berry as Sisall Ammidon
- Polly Archer as Camilla Ammidon
- Betty Bronson as Janet Ammidon
- George Fawcett as Barzil Dunsack
- Raymond Hatton as Edward Dunsack
- Helen Lindroth as Kate Vollar
- Dan Pennell as Broadrick
- George S. Stevens as The Butler
- Mimi Sherwood as The Maid
- Frances Hatton as The Nurse

== Production notes ==
Exterior scenes were shot on location in Salem, Massachusetts, where the film is also set.

== Preservation ==
No copies of Java Head are listed in any film archives, which suggests that it is a lost film.

== Gallery ==
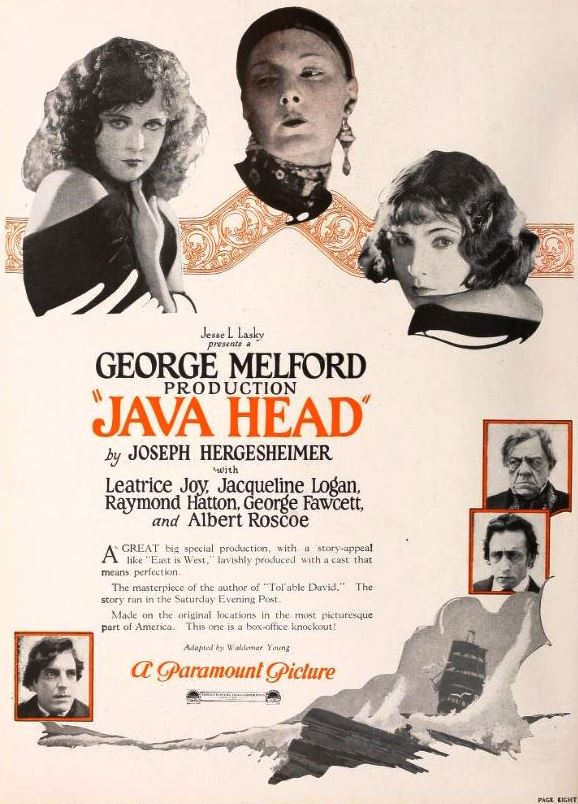
Film poster

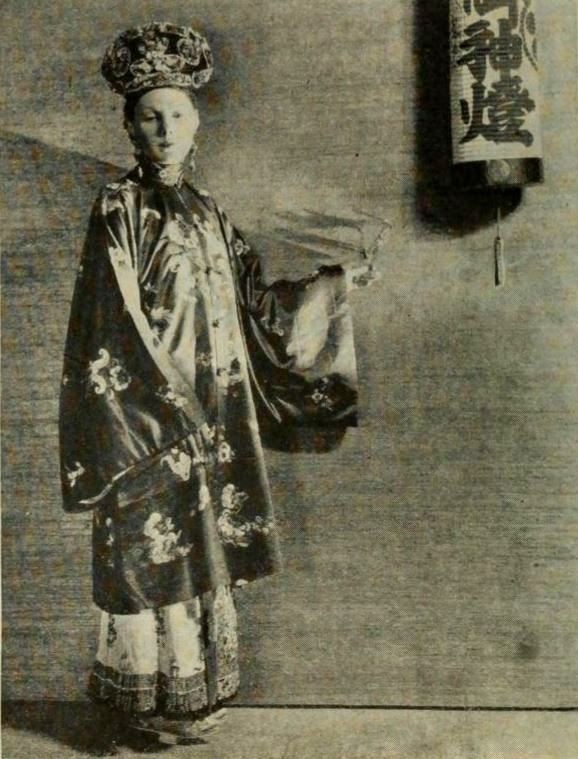
Film still with Leatrice Joy

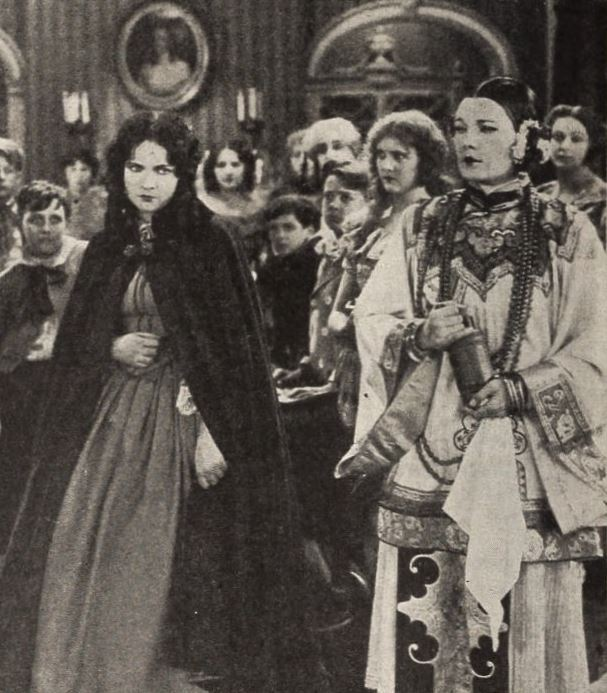
Jacqueline Logan and Leatrice Joy

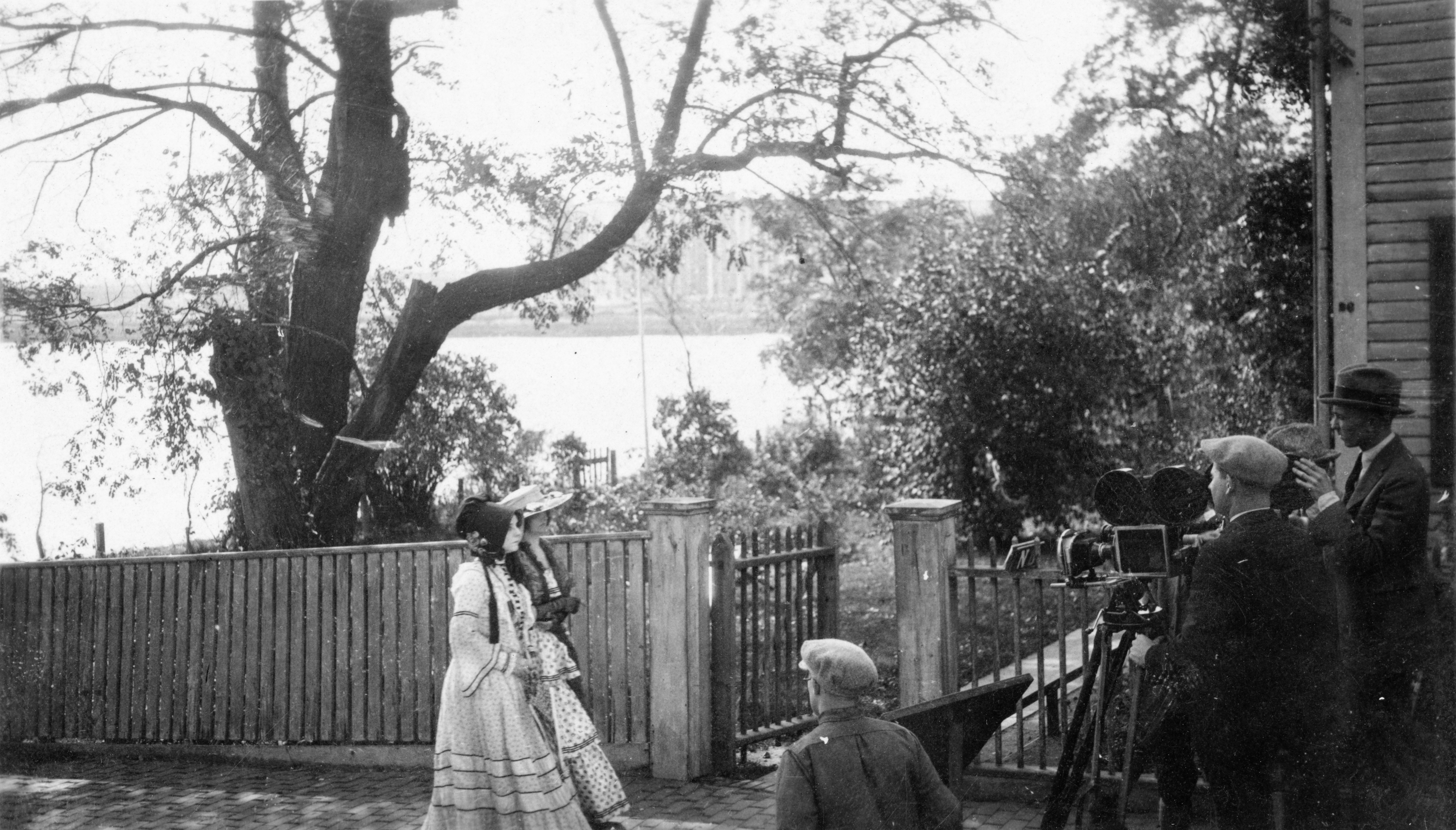
Filming on Hardy Street in Salem, October 1922
