= Why Girls Go Back Home =

1926 film

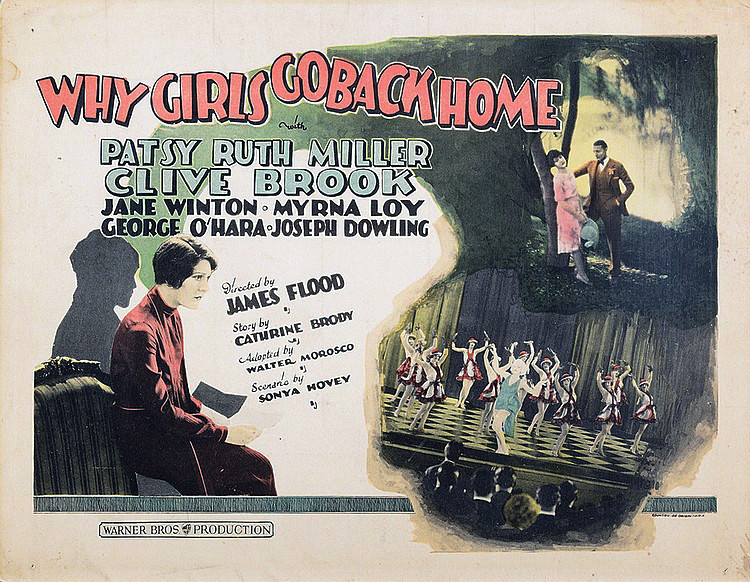
- Lobby card
- Directed by: James Flood
- Written by: Walter Morosco (adaptation); Sonya Hovey (scenario)
- Story by: Catherine Brody
- Starring: Patsy Ruth Miller; Clive Brook
- Cinematography: Charles Van Enger; Frank Kesson
- Production company: Warner Bros.
- Distributed by: Warner Bros.
- Release date: March 1, 1926
- Running time: 60 minutes; six reels (5,262 feet)
- Country: United States
- Language: Silent (English intertitles)

Why Girls Go Back Home is a lost 1926 American silent comedy drama film produced and distributed by Warner Bros. James Flood directed and Patsy Ruth Miller and Clive Brook starred. Myrna Loy has a feature role. The film is a sequel to Warner Bros.'s 1921 Why Girls Leave Home, which was a box office hit.

== Plot ==
As described in a film magazine review, Marie Downey, a trusting young country woman, falls in love with touring stage actor Clifford Dudley as his touring troupe takes up residence in the hotel run by Marie's father. When he finds that she has fallen for him, Clifford plans a hasty departure. Both lovestruck and stagestruck, Marie follows Clifford to New York City, where she ends up getting a job in old Broadway as a chorus girl. She tries desperately to get in touch with Clifford, but he acts as if he does not even know she's alive as he becomes a matinée idol on Broadway. Thanks to a lucky break, Marie becomes the star of the show in which she is appearing, whereupon Clifford finally acknowledges her existence. This time, however, she gives Clifford the cold shoulder then turns her back on New York and heads home (hence the title). Clifford follows her on the train, setting the stage for a tender reconciliation.

== Cast ==
- Patsy Ruth Miller as Marie Downey
- Clive Brook as Clifford Dudley
- Jane Winton as Model
- Myrna Loy as Sally Short
- George O'Hara as John Ross
- Joseph J. Dowling as Joe Downey
- Virginia Ainsworth as Crook in Badger Game
- Brooks Benedict as Crook in Badger Game
- Herbert Prior as Crook in Badger Game

== Preservation ==
With no prints of Why Girls Go Back Home located in any film archives, it is now a lost film. Warner Bros. records of the film's negative have a notation, "Junked 12/27/48" (i.e., December 27, 1948). Warner Bros. destroyed many of its pre-1933 negatives in the late 1940s and 1950s due to nitrate film decomposition.
