= Fresh Faces =

Modeling contest

Fresh Faces is an annual international modeling contest launched in 2010 by ModelManagement.com, an online social networking website for models, photographers, modeling agencies and other fashion industry professionals. The contest showcases young fashion model entrants from over 50 countries in order to discover new talent for the fashion industry. Each year, thousands of contestants, typically between the ages of 15 and 25, compete in local contests for a chance to represent their country in the world final. Finalists are selected according to voting by the general public through social media and ModelManagement.com with the winners selected by a jury of fashion professionals.

The male and female winners of the final event, held in Barcelona, Spain, receive a modeling contract with an international modeling agency. The contest is sponsored by FashionTV, model agencies, and fashion and beauty brands that have included Revlon, Calvin Klein, Levi Strauss, Diesel and Lacoste.

== Female titleholders ==
Year	Name	Country	Modeling Agencies	Link
2010	Sara San Martín	Spain	Traffic, IMG, Group	
2011	Sita Abellán del Rey	Spain	Traffic, Wilhelmina, Monster Management	
2012	Magdalena Mikolajuk	Poland	Traffic	
2013	Fan Wang	China	ESEE	

== Male titleholders ==
Year	Name	Country	Modeling Agencies	Link
2010	Daniel Pérez García	Spain	Traffic	
2011	Valentin Cardon	France	Independent Men, Nathalie	
2012	José Manuel Fernández	Spain	Traffic	
2013	Bogdan Ionut	Romania	MRA	

== Notable participants ==
Notable participants that did not win the contest were 2010 participant Janina Leontschuk who walked in a show by Diane von Fürstenberg, 2011 finalist Jessica Aidi who was photographed by Karl Lagerfeld for the cover of Elle, and 2013 semifinalist Elisabeth Winters who appeared in an editorial in Horse Magazine.

Notable figures from the fashion world that have participated in the contest juries are Swiss photographer Yvan Rodic also known as FaceHunter, German model agent Thomas Zeumer, Italian model Antonia Dell'Atte model agent Peyman Amin and former judge of Germany's Next Topmodel, Spanish celebrity Erik Putzbach French choreographer Marie-Ange Schmitt-Lebreton and former training director for Supermodelo, and Andreas von Estorff the German founder of Model Management.
