= Tomorrow's Love =

1925 film

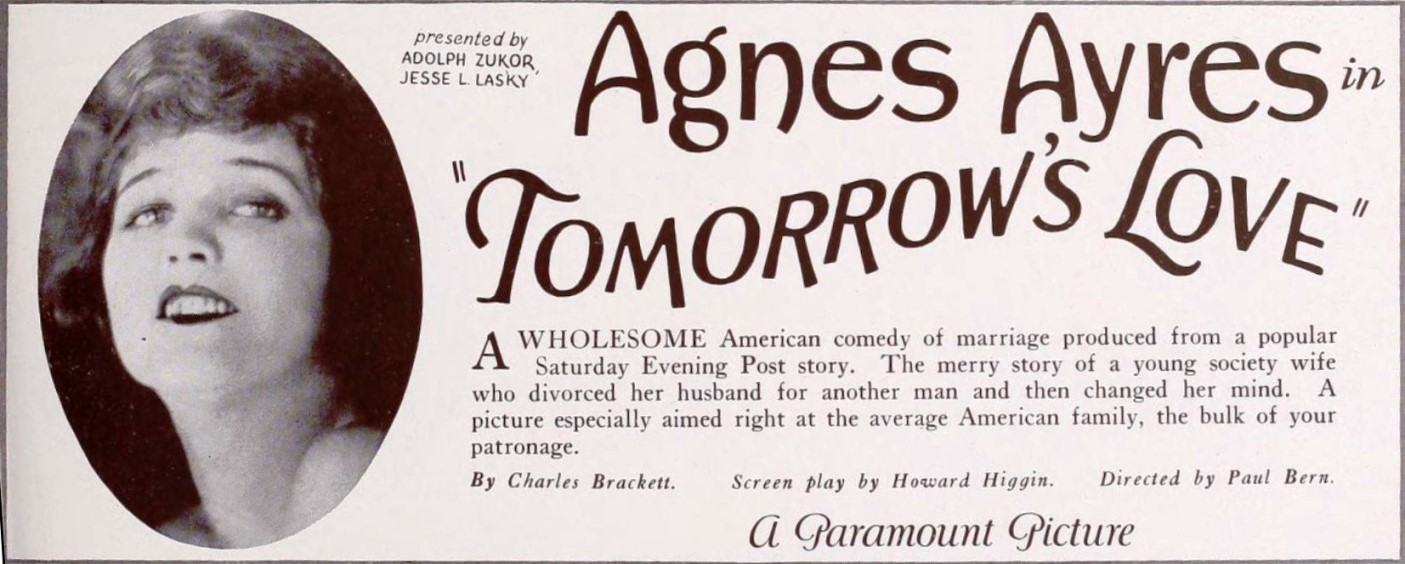
- Advertisement
- Directed by: Paul Bern
- Screenplay by: Howard Higgin
- Based on: "Interlocutory" by Charles Brackett
- Produced by: Jesse L. Lasky; Adolph Zukor
- Starring: Agnes Ayres; Pat O'Malley; Raymond Hatton; Jane Winton
- Cinematography: Bert Glennon
- Production company: Famous Players–Lasky Corporation
- Distributed by: Paramount Pictures
- Release date: January 5, 1925
- Running time: 60 minutes
- Country: United States
- Language: Silent (English intertitles)

Tomorrow's Love is a 1925 American silent comedy film directed by Paul Bern, written by Charles Brackett and Howard Higgin, and starring Agnes Ayres. Pat O'Malley, Raymond Hatton, Jane Winton, Ruby Lafayette, and Dale Fuller. It was released on January 5, 1925, by Paramount Pictures.

== Plot ==
As described in a review in a film magazine, Judith marries Robert Stanley, they go on a honeymoon, and for a time they are very happy. However, by the end of the first year she has become irritated by his stubbornness and petty fault-finding. An open window causes him to catch a cold, but he still goes to work anyway in the rain. His car breaks down and an old friend, Bess Carlysle, a vamp, happens along and takes him to her apartment. There she makes him take a hot foot bath and gives him whiskey for his cold. Judith discovers that he is with Bess and uses this to her advantage to sue for divorce. She obtains a decree that becomes effective in one year. She goes to Europe but, after being the target of some sophisticated retorts by the philanderer Brown, soon discovers that she is still in love with Robert. When Robert's Grandmother advices her to hurry home lest Robert marries Bess, she does so, arriving just minutes prior to midnight, being the last day before the divorce becoming final. There is a mad struggle where the wife attempts to outwit the clever vamp. Through a ruse by the Grandmother's, Judith gets Robert away from Bess, and the couple become reconciled and agree to start all over again.

== Cast ==
- Agnes Ayres as Judith Stanley
- Pat O'Malley as Robert Stanley
- Raymond Hatton as Brown
- Jane Winton as Bess Carlysle
- Ruby Lafayette as Grandmother
- Dale Fuller as Maid
- Spec O'Donnell (uncredited)

== Preservation ==
With no copies of Tomorrow's Love located in any film archives, it is a lost film.
