= Wages for Wives =

1925 film

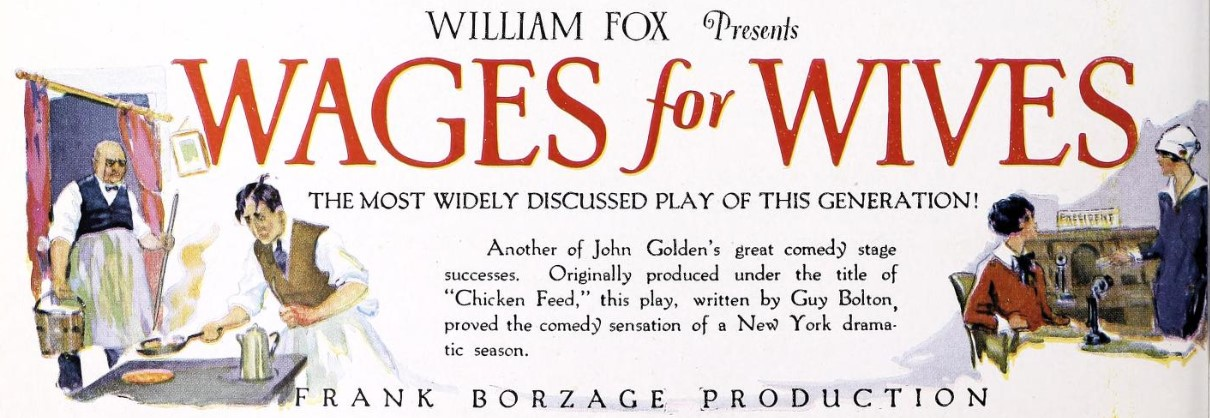
- Advertisement
- Directed by: Frank Borzage
- Written by: Kenneth B. Clarke
- Based on: Chicken Feed; or, Wages for Wives by John Golden
- Starring: Jacqueline Logan; Creighton Hale; Earle Foxe; ZaSu Pitts; Claude Gillingwater; David Butler
- Cinematography: Ernest Palmer
- Production company: Fox Film Corporation
- Distributed by: Fox Film Corporation
- Release date: December 15, 1925
- Running time: 7 reels; 70 minutes
- Country: United States
- Language: Silent (English intertitles)

Wages for Wives is a lost 1925 American silent comedy film directed by Frank Borzage and starring Jacqueline Logan, Creighton Hale, Earle Foxe, ZaSu Pitts, Claude Gillingwater, and David Butler. The film was released by Fox Film Corporation on December 15, 1925.

== Plot ==
As described in a review in a film magazine, a new bride persuades her mother and a woman friend to join with her in leaving their husbands until they agree to a fifty-fifty split on their wages. The husbands rebel and decide to keep house for themselves, while the wives go to a big boarding house. Eventually, after the women have almost eaten their hearts out with longing, and a vamp has succeeded in complicating matters, reconciliations occur after the recalcitrant husbands have thoroughly sickened of their attempts to show their independence.

== Cast ==
- Jacqueline Logan as Nell Bailey
- Creighton Hale as Danny Kester
- Earle Foxe as Hughie Logan
- ZaSu Pitts as Luella Logan
- Claude Gillingwater as Jim Bailey
- David Butler as Chester Logan
- Margaret Seddon as Annie Bailey
- Margaret Livingston as Carol Bixby
- Dan Mason as Mr. Tevis
- Tom Ricketts as Judge McLean

== Preservation ==
With no prints of Wages for Wives located in any film archives, it is a lost film.
