= Nothing to Wear =

1928 film

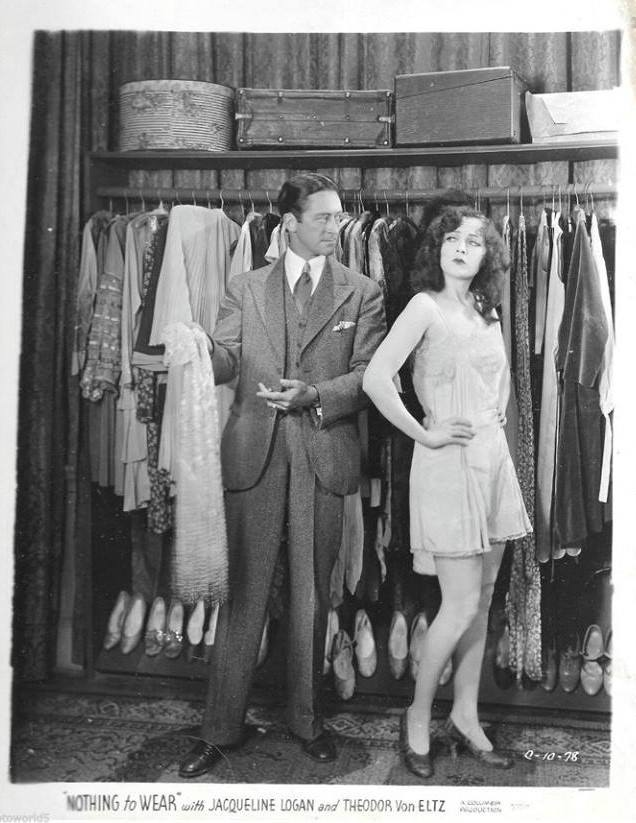
- Directed by: Erle C. Kenton
- Written by: Peter Milne
- Produced by: Jack Cohn
- Starring: Jacqueline Logan; Theodore von Eltz; Bryant Washburn
- Cinematography: Joseph Walker
- Edited by: Ben Pivar
- Production company: Columbia Pictures
- Distributed by: Columbia Pictures
- Release date: November 5, 1928
- Running time: 56 minutes
- Country: United States
- Languages: Silent; English intertitles

Nothing to Wear is a lost 1928 American comedy film directed by Erle C. Kenton and starring Jacqueline Logan, Theodore von Eltz and Bryant Washburn.

== Cast ==
- Jacqueline Logan as Jackie Standish
- Theodore von Eltz as Phil Stanndish
- Bryant Washburn as Tommy Butler
- Jane Winton as Irene Hawley
- William Irving as Detective
- Edythe Flynn as Maid

== Bibliography ==
- James Monaco. The Encyclopedia of Film. Perigee Books, 1991.
