= Perch of the Devil =

1927 silent film

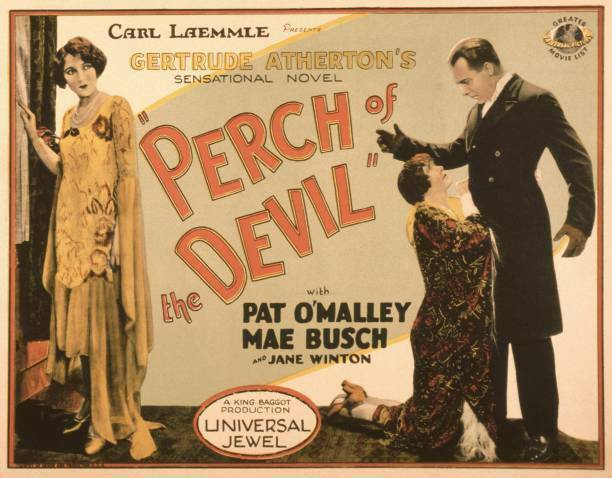
- Lobby card
- Directed by: King Baggot
- Written by: Mary O'Hara
- Based on: Perch of the Devil by Gertrude Atherton
- Produced by: Carl Laemmle
- Starring: Mae Busch; Pat O'Malley; Jane Winton
- Cinematography: Charles J. Stumar
- Production company: Universal Pictures
- Distributed by: Universal Pictures
- Release date: March 6, 1927
- Running time: 70 minutes
- Country: United States
- Language: Silent (English intertitles)

Perch of the Devil is a 1927 American silent drama film directed by King Baggot and starring Mae Busch, Pat O'Malley, and Jane Winton. It is based on the 1914 novel of the same title by Gertrude Atherton.

== Plot ==
As described in a film magazine, Ida Hook, a virile and slangy product of the West, casts eyes upon Gregory Compton, a young mining engineer, and determines to marry him. Gregory is prospecting for gold on his ranch near Butte where the young couple afterwards live in a rudely constructed house. Accustomed to the excitement of conquest, Ida complains bitterly of her lonely life on the ranch. Ora Blake, a wealthy young widow, stops at the ranch and hears Ida's tale of woe. She sympathizes with the young self-pitying wife at the same time making herself so agreeable to Gregory that he thinks he has found in her a kindred spirit. He agrees to let Ora take Ida to Europe. In fashionable continental capitals, Ida gains polish and wins the love of Lord Mobray, but in time she tires of the gay life of Europe and the gallant nobility loses its fascination. She now realizes that her husband is the man she really loves. A cable announces the discovery of gold on the Compton ranch. Ida can have anything that money will buy, but she craves only the love of Gregory. She replies with a loving message which Ora politely offers to take care of. The latter changes the wording, making Ida appear to be a mercenary wife. They take the first boat for America. Upon arriving in Butte, Ida does not know what to make of it when Greg fails to meet her at the train. The chauffeur takes her to a magnificent house inhabited only by the servants. When she phones Greg at the ranch, he refers her to his lawyer and hangs up abruptly. Upon the arrival of Lord Mobray, Ida holds a house party in his honor and prevails upon Greg to attend. She is crestfallen when he leaves with the other guests. She learns from the English peer that Ora is expecting to marry Greg. This is her first intimation of her companion's perfidy. She gets into her car and speeds to Ora's bungalow, where she finds the two in embrace. Greg is called out by a danger alarm from the mine. Ida's European polish is a thing forgotten. With a paper knife in her hand, she advances on her enemy. Ora flees from the house and takes refuge in the mine shaft where she is cornered by Ida. The two women fight. Ida finally gaining a strangle hold. Greg sees that one of the mine corridors is filling with water. To avoid a calamity he orders the men to dynamite the end of the shaft and let the water flow into the lower shaft. The struggling women are carried away by the flood. Ora clings desperately to the brink of a deep shaft and pleads with Ida to save her life. Ida gives in and extends a helping hand. Hearing that two women have entered the lower shaft, Greg comes to the rescue. Ida throws the limp form of Ora at his feet in scorn and goes home. She orders her maid to pack up for a journey, but Greg comes in and takes her in his arms. He is back to stay.

== Cast ==
- Mae Busch as Ida Hook
- Pat O'Malley as Gregory Compton
- Jane Winton as Ora Blake
- Theodore von Eltz as Lord Mobray
- Mario Carillo as Marchese Valdonia
- Lincoln Stedman as Freddy Dipper
- George Kuwa as Charley Lee
- Gertrude Oakman as Ruby Miller
- Martha Franklin as Mrs. Stout

== Preservation ==
With no prints of Perch of the Devil located in any film archives, it is considered a lost film.

== Bibliography ==
- Donald W. McCaffrey & Christopher P. Jacobs. Guide to the Silent Years of American Cinema. Greenwood Publishing, 1999. ISBN 0-313-30345-2
