= Night Life (1927 film) =

1927 silent drama film

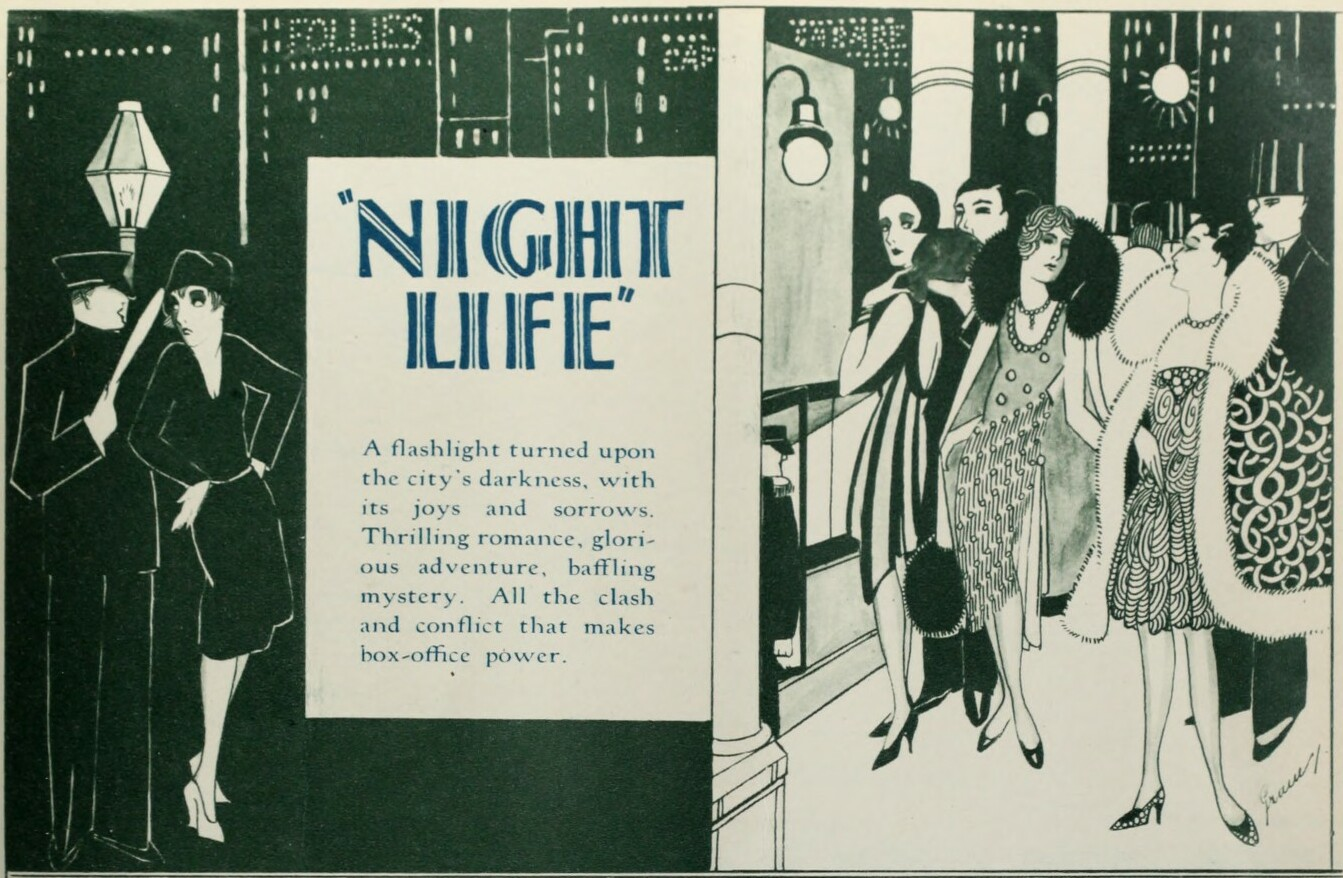
- Advertisement
- Directed by: George Archainbaud
- Written by: Harry Braxton; Albert S. Le Vino; Viola Brothers Shore
- Starring: Alice Day; John Harron; Eddie Gribbon
- Cinematography: Chester A. Lyons
- Edited by: Desmond O'Brien
- Production company: Tiffany Pictures
- Distributed by: Tiffany Pictures
- Release date: November 1, 1927
- Running time: 70 minutes
- Country: United States
- Language: Silent (English intertitles)

Night Life is a 1927 American silent drama film directed by George Archainbaud and starring Alice Day, John Harron, and Eddie Gribbon.

== Plot ==
In post-World War I Vienna, a confidence trickster falls in love with a struggling waitress

== Cast ==
- Alice Day as Anna
- John Harron as Max
- Eddie Gribbon as Nick
- Walter Hiers as Manager
- Lionel Braham as War Profiteer
- Kitty Barlow as Wife of War Profiteer
- Anne Shirley as Daughter of War Profiteer
- Mary Jane Irving a Daughter of War Profiteer
- Audrey Sewell as Daughter of War Profiteer
- Earl Metcalfe as Swain
- Patricia Avery as Maid
- Snitz Edwards as Merry-Go-Round Manager
- Violet Palmer as Beer Garden Waitress
- Lydia Yeamans as Landlady

== Preservation ==
With no prints of Night Life located in any film archives, it is a lost film.

== Bibliography ==
- Connelly, Robert B. The Silents: Silent Feature Films, 1910-36, Volume 40, Issue 2. December Press, 1998.
- Munden, Kenneth White. The American Film Institute Catalog of Motion Pictures Produced in the United States, Part 1. University of California Press, 1997.
