= Sixty Cents an Hour =

1923 film by Joseph Henabery

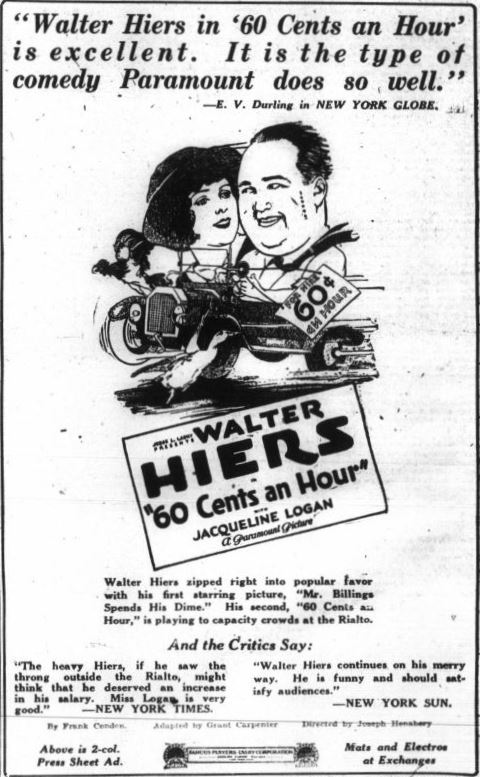
- Advertisement
- Directed by: Joseph Henabery
- Screenplay by: Grant Carpenter; Frank Condon
- Produced by: Jesse L. Lasky
- Starring: Walter Hiers; Jacqueline Logan; Ricardo Cortez; Charles Stanton Ogle; Lucille Ward; Robert Dudley
- Cinematography: Faxon M. Dean
- Production company: Famous Players–Lasky Corporation
- Distributed by: Paramount Pictures
- Release date: May 13, 1923
- Running time: 60 minutes
- Country: United States
- Language: Silent (English intertitles)

Sixty Cents an Hour is a lost 1923 American silent comedy film directed by Joseph Henabery and written by Grant Carpenter and Frank Condon. Starring Walter Hiers, Jacqueline Logan, Ricardo Cortez, Charles Stanton Ogle, Lucille Ward, and Robert Dudley, it was released on May 13, 1923, by Paramount Pictures.

== Cast ==
- Walter Hiers as Jimmy Kirk
- Jacqueline Logan as Mamie Smith
- Ricardo Cortez as William Davis
- Charles Stanton Ogle as James Smith
- Lucille Ward as Mrs. Smith
- Robert Dudley as Storekeeper
- Clarence Burton as Crook
- Guy Oliver as Crook
- Cullen Tate as Crook

== Production ==
Exteriors for Sixty Cents an Hour were filmed in Griffith Park, Los Angeles.

== Preservation ==
With no holdings located in archives, Sixty Cents an Hour is considered a lost film.
