= Jacqueline Logan =

American actress (1902–1983)

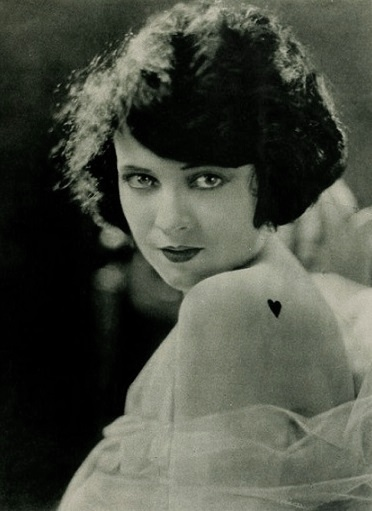
- Logan in 1922
- Born: November 30, 1902; Corsicana, Texas, U.S.
- Died: April 4, 1983 (aged 80); Melbourne, Florida, U.S.
- Occupation: Actress
- Years active: 1921–1931, 1973
- Spouses: Ralph James Gillespie (m. 1925; div. 1928) William Lawrence "Larry" Winston (m. 1928; div. 1947)

Jacqueline Medura Logan (November 30, 1902 – April 4, 1983) was an American actress and silent film star. Logan was a WAMPAS Baby Star of 1922.

== Early life ==
Logan was born in Corsicana, Texas, on November 30, 1902, the only child of Charles A. Logan and Marian Logan. Her father was an architect and her mother, who was born to a French mother and Irish father, was briefly an opera singer and later gave vocal lessons. Her childhood was spent in El Paso, Colorado and Scottsbluff, Nebraska where she briefly worked as a journalist for the Scottsbluff Republican.

== Stage career and Broadway ==
Logan traveled to Colorado Springs, Colorado, for her health and acted in stock theater there. While there she took a course in journalism from Ford Frick, who later became commissioner of Major League Baseball. Setting out to Chicago, Logan found employment dancing in a stage production of a theater. Her family believed she intended to visit an uncle in the windy city and also attend college. To get the job she lied about her age, and when her uncle found out, he was irate. She was let go from the stage job as a result.

She left Chicago and set out for New York City. Again Logan was untruthful regarding her intentions. With her on her trip to New York was a theatrical troupe. She secured a small role in Florodora, a musical on Broadway in 1920. At this time, Flo Ziegfeld noticed her and hired her for a job dancing on his Ziegfeld Roof. She replaced Billie Donovan who was leaving to act in films in Hollywood. Together with the Ziegfeld venture, Logan modeled as a Dobbs Girl in Alfred Cheney Johnston photographs. She also had a part in a Johnny Hines' comedy short. Her other Broadway credits included Two Strange Women (1933) and Merrily We Roll Along (1934).

== Motion pictures ==
Logan was awarded a screen test with the then unknown actor Ben Lyon. Lyon was later (1930) the husband of Hollywood actress Bebe Daniels and became a prominent figure in the movies. Later he furthered the careers of such stars as Marilyn Monroe. Working for Associated Producers, Logan was featured opposite Jane Peters, the future Carole Lombard in the film A Perfect Crime (1921). Peters was only a youth, appearing as a pretty blonde child actress. The same year she played with Mabel Normand in Molly O' (1921).

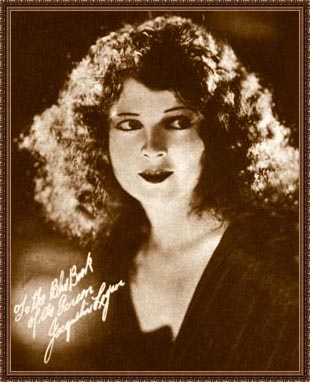
Publicity photo of Logan from The Blue Book of the Screen by Ruth Wing (1923)

Other features she starred in during the early 1920s include Burning Sands (1922), A Blind Bargain (1922), Sixty Cents an Hour (1923), Java Head (1923), and A Man Must Live (1924). Among her co-stars were Thomas Meighan, Milton Sills, Ricardo Cortez, Leatrice Joy, Richard Dix, Lon Chaney Sr., and William Powell. The House of Youth (1924) is described as her "first starring vehicle."

In 1926, Logan made Footloose Widows with Louise Fazenda and The Blood Ship in 1927 with Richard Arlen. Other prominent leading men whom the actress worked with were Lionel Barrymore, John Barrymore, and Antonio Moreno.

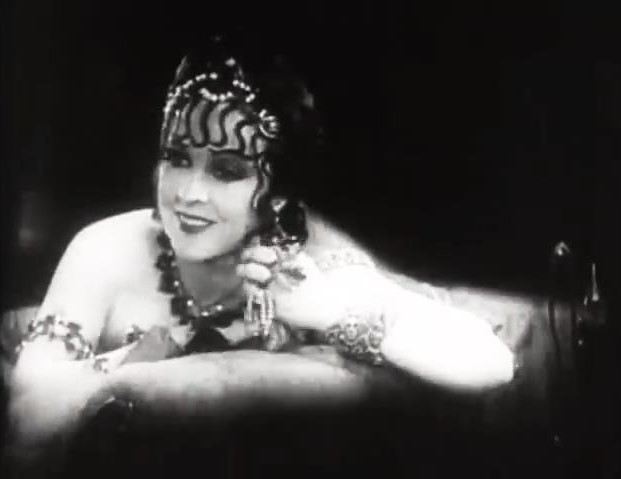
Logan in the trailer for the 1927 silent epic The King of Kings

Logan was selected by Cecil B. De Mille for the role of Mary Magdalene in the classic The King of Kings (1927). The part was much sought after by actresses of the era. The movie broke records for audience attendance. It was shown somewhere in the world each day for decades after its release. When talking pictures began, Logan's voice was recorded to accompany her acting part in the original silent film.

The actress of silent films was largely unsuccessful in the new medium of talkies. In an early musical, The Show of Shows (1929), Logan was a member of an all-star cast. This followed her work in some early and profitable sound films for Columbia Pictures.

== Writer and director of films ==
Logan was in England for a time to do stage work such as Smoky Cell. This gained for her some good reviews. After completing the English film The Middle Watch, she was awarded a Command Performance. British International Pictures signed her to write and direct. She wrote Knock-Out (1931) and wrote and directed Strictly Business (1931). Both were successful movies.

The new writer/director found herself less in demand behind the camera when she returned to Hollywood. Columbia Pictures production chief Harry Cohn was complimentary of her work but unwilling to sign a female director.

Logan retired from films entirely after her marriage in 1934. Just prior to this she was part of several Broadway plays like Merrily We Roll Along and Two Strange Women.

== Later years ==
Jacqueline Logan was married three times. Her first marriage was to Ralph James Gillespie, also referred to as Robert Gillespie, on June 4, 1925. Logan filed for divorce in 1927, claiming that Gillespie kicked her and called her dumb.

Five months later, Logan eloped to Tijuana with Los Angeles broker Larry Winston. Upon learning she could face a bigamy charge if she returned to the United States, the couple lived separately until the interlocutory decree expired. Logan's divorce from Gillespie became final in March 1928, and she married Winston in June of that year.

After divorcing Winston in 1947, Logan resided in Westchester County, New York into the late 1960s. She spent her winters in Florida where she visited friends such as Lila Lee and Dorothy Dalton, both former actresses. The remainder of the year she resided in Bedford Hills, New York with her prize Great Dane from the Lina Basquette Kennels.

== Death ==
Logan, at age 80, died in Melbourne, Florida in 1983. Her gravesite is in Greenwood Cemetery in Decatur, Illinois.

== Filmography ==
- A Perfect Crime (1921)
- White and Unmarried (1921)
- The Fighting Lover (1921)
- Molly O (1921)
- Fool's Paradise (1921)
- Gay and Devilish (1922)
- A Tailor-Made Man (1922)
- Saved by Radio (1922)
- Burning Sands (1922)
- Ebb Tide (1922)
- A Blind Bargain (1922)
- Java Head (1923)
- Mr. Billings Spends His Dime (1923)
- Sixty Cents an Hour (1923)
- Salomy Jane (1923)
- The Light That Failed (1923)
- Flaming Barriers (1924)
- The Dawn of a Tomorrow (1924)
- Code of the Sea (1924)
- Dynamite Smith (1924)
- The House of Youth (1924)
- Manhattan (1924)
- A Man Must Live (1925)
- The Sky Raider (1925)
- Playing with Souls (1925)
- If Marriage Fails (1925)
- Thank You (1925)
- Peacock Feathers (1925)
- When the Door Opened (1925)
- Wages for Wives (1925)
- The Outsider (1926)
- White Mice (1926)
- Out of the Storm (1926)
- Tony Runs Wild (1926)
- Footloose Widows (1926)
- One Hour of Love (1927)
- The King of Kings (1927)
- The Blood Ship (1927)
- For Ladies Only (1927)
- The Wise Wife (1927)
- The Leopard Lady (1928)
- Midnight Madness (1928)
- Broadway Daddies (1928)
- The Beautiful Spy (1928)
- The Cop (1928)
- Stocks and Blondes (1928)
- Power (1928)
- The Charge of the Gauchos (1928)
- The Lookout Girl (1928)
- Nothing to Wear (1928)
- Ships of the Night (1928)
- The River Woman (1928)
- The Faker (1929)
- Stark Mad (1929)
- The Bachelor Girl (1929)
- The King of the Kongo (1929)
- The Show of Shows (1929)
- Sombras habaneras (1929)
- General Crack (1930)
- Symphony in Two Flats (1930)
- The Middle Watch (1930)
- Strictly Business (1931)
- Shadows (1931)
