= Alex the Great =

1928 film

- Directed by: Dudley Murphy
- Written by: Randolph Bartlett; Dudley Murphy; H.C. Witwer
- Starring: Richard 'Skeets' Gallagher; Albert Conti; Patricia Avery
- Cinematography: Virgil Miller
- Edited by: Ann McKnight
- Production company: Film Booking Offices of America
- Distributed by: Film Booking Offices of America; Ideal Films (UK)
- Release date: May 13, 1928
- Running time: 70 minutes
- Country: United States
- Languages: Silent; English intertitles

Alex the Great is a lost 1928 American silent comedy film directed by Dudley Murphy and starring Richard 'Skeets' Gallagher, Albert Conti and Patricia Avery.

== Cast ==
- Richard 'Skeets' Gallagher as Alex the Great
- Albert Conti as Ed
- Patricia Avery as Muriel
- Ruth Dwyer as Alice
- Charles Byer as Brown
- J. Barney Sherry as Smith

== Bibliography ==
- Munden, Kenneth White. The American Film Institute Catalog of Motion Pictures Produced in the United States, Part 1. University of California Press, 1997.
