= Shanghaied Love =

1931 drama film

- Directed by: George B. Seitz
- Written by: Roy Chanslor; Jack Cunningham
- Based on: The Blood Ship by Norman Springer
- Starring: Richard Cromwell; Sally Blane; Noah Beery
- Cinematography: Ted Tetzlaff
- Edited by: Gene Milford
- Production company: Columbia Pictures
- Distributed by: Columbia Pictures
- Release date: September 20, 1931
- Running time: 75 minutes
- Country: United States
- Language: English

Shanghaied Love is a 1931 American pre-Code drama film directed by George B. Seitz and starring Richard Cromwell, Sally Blane and Noah Beery. It was produced and released by Columbia Pictures. The film's sets were designed by the art director Stephen Goosson. It is based on the 1922 novel The Blood Ship by Norman Springer, previously made into the 1927 silent film The Blood Ship.

== Plot ==
The crew of the Black Yankee is mostly composed of men shanghaied from San Francisco but also includes Newman a disgraced former sea captain who has a past with the brutal commander of the ship Captain Swope.

== Cast ==
- Richard Cromwell as The Boy
- Sally Blane as Mary Swope
- Noah Beery as Capt. 'Black Yankee' Angus Swope
- Willard Robertson as Newman
- Sidney Bracey as The Rat
- Richard Alexander as Eric
- Ed Brady as Fitzgibbons
- Erville Alderson as Deaken
- Jack Cheatham as Lynch
- Fred Toones as Snowflake
- Lionel Belmore as The Knitting Swede

== See also ==
- List of lost films

== Bibliography ==
- Goble, Alan. The Complete Index to Literary Sources in Film. Walter de Gruyter, 1999.
