= Out of the Storm (1926 film) =

1926 film

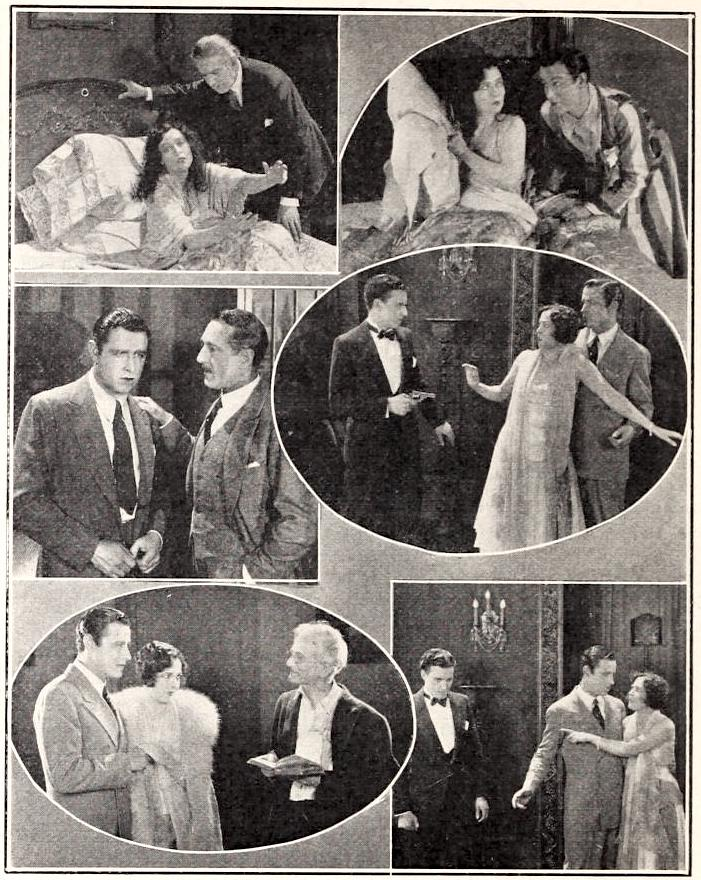
- Scenes from the film
- Directed by: Louis J. Gasnier
- Written by: Leete Renick Brown; Lois Hutchinson; Arthur Stringer (story)
- Starring: Jacqueline Logan; Tyrone Power Sr.; Montagu Love
- Cinematography: George Meehan; Mack Stengler
- Edited by: James C. McKay
- Production company: Tiffany Pictures
- Distributed by: Tiffany Pictures
- Release date: April 10, 1926
- Running time: 70 minutes
- Country: United States
- Languages: Silent; English intertitles

Out of the Storm is a 1926 American silent drama film directed by Louis J. Gasnier and starring Jacqueline Logan, Tyrone Power Sr. and Montagu Love.

== Cast ==
- Jacqueline Logan as Mary Lawrence
- Tyrone Power Sr. as Mr. Lawrence
- Edmund Burns as James Morton
- Montagu Love as Timothy Keith
- Eddie Phillips as Leonard Keith
- George Fawcett as Judge Meeman
- Crauford Kent as Defense Attorney
- Jay Hunt as Justice of the Peace
- Joseph W. Girard as The Warden

== Bibliography ==
- Munden, Kenneth White. The American Film Institute Catalog of Motion Pictures Produced in the United States, Part 1. University of California Press, 1997.
