= Stark Mad =

1929 film

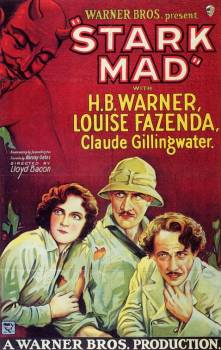
- Theatrical release poster
- Directed by: Lloyd Bacon
- Screenplay by: Harvey Gates; Francis Powers (intertitles for silent version, uncredited)
- Story by: Jerome Kingston
- Starring: H. B. Warner
- Cinematography: Barney McGill
- Edited by: Ralph Dawson
- Production company: Warner Bros. Pictures
- Distributed by: Warner Bros. Pictures
- Release date: February 2, 1929
- Running time: 70 minutes; 7 reels (sound version)
- Country: United States
- Language: English

Stark Mad is a 1929 American sound (All-Talking) pre-Code adventure film produced and distributed by Warner Bros. Pictures, directed by Lloyd Bacon, and starring H. B. Warner, Louise Fazenda, Jacqueline Logan and Henry B. Walthall. This lurid jungle melodrama was an attempt to emulate the then-popular jungle horror films being made at the time by Tod Browning and Lon Chaney. The film was unusual in that it is set in the jungles of Central America rather than Africa.

== Plot ==
Bob Rutherford and his native guide, Simpson, vanish during a hunting trip deep in the jungles of Central America. When all contact ceases, Bob's father, James Rutherford, organizes a rescue expedition and sails to the last known location on the coast where the pair were seen.

The search party includes Miss Fleming, Mr. Rutherford's efficient secretary; Irene Malloy, Bob's fiancée; Captain Rhodes, commander of the yacht; Amos Sewald, an explorer hired to lead the search; Dr. Milo, a naturalist; the First Mate; and Rutherford himself. Just before the party is to land, the mysterious death of one of the sailors leads the crew to threaten mutiny. As the party reaches the shore, they are intercepted by Professor Dangerfield, an authority on Central American ruins, who has traveled 400 miles to warn them. With him is Simpson, Bob's guide, who has emerged alone from the jungle, now deranged and violent.

Dangerfield urges them not to proceed, believing that Bob must be dead based on Simpson's ravings. However, Mr. Rutherford insists on continuing. The group proceeds inland, leaving Simpson in chains aboard the yacht for safety. Dangerfield joins them, though he is treated with open hostility by Sewald. Irene, however, begins to feel a strange fascination toward the older man.

Making their way through treacherous jungle terrain, the party discovers the ruins of an ancient Mayan temple and chooses to spend the night inside its vast stone chambers. That night, eerie events unfold: the hounds brought for the search vanish after pursuing something unseen. Concerned, Dangerfield, Irene, and Rutherford follow the dogs to investigate, leaving a single lantern behind with the remaining members of the party. The light of that lantern mysteriously goes out shortly after they leave, suggesting that someone—or something—has been left behind in the dark with the others.

As the three searchers press deeper, they come upon a massive stone door that begins to close before them. They manage to pry it open just enough for Irene to slip through—only for her to scream and vanish into the darkness. Dangerfield and Rutherford succeed in forcing their way inside, where they discover a monstrous ape chained to the floor.

Continuing their search through the temple's twisting chambers, the party is suddenly attacked. Captain Rhodes is seized and dragged away by a hulking, taloned creature. Earlier, a poison arrow had narrowly missed Dangerfield, but now another arrow flies through the shadows and fatally strikes Sewald. Because of past animosity, Dangerfield is suspected of the killing.

Lanterns throughout the temple begin to fail, and it's discovered that their oil containers have been punctured—possibly by the ape, who Dangerfield theorizes has learned to free and rechain himself instinctively after each foray.

Dangerfield and Irene grow closer, even as paranoia builds. Suspicion turns toward Captain Rhodes when it's discovered that his supposedly paralyzed arm is fully functional. At a moment when the entire group is gathered in one room, Rhodes seizes the opportunity to rush out and bolts the heavy door behind him—trapping the others inside.

Moments later, a mechanical device is triggered: the floor begins to collapse, stone by stone, starting from the center and working outward toward the walls. The group is forced to crowd along the edges, the only escape being a narrow high window. As Dangerfield lifts Irene toward it in a desperate attempt to help her escape, the ape reappears and drags her through.

Irene has fainted, but Simpson, the mad guide, suddenly appears at the window and gives the distinctive whistle Bob had once taught him. His reason slowly returning, Simpson unbolts the door just in time to free the trapped party before the floor gives way completely. He explains that the deranged hermit who formerly occupied the ruins had murdered Bob Rutherford two months earlier. Simpson had eventually killed the hermit, but was driven insane by the horror of what he had witnessed.

== Cast ==
- H. B. Warner as Professor Dangerfield
- Louise Fazenda as Mrs. Fleming
- Jacqueline Logan as Irene
- Henry B. Walthall as Captain Rhodes
- Claude Gillingwater as James Rutherford
- John Miljan as Dr. Milo
- Andre Beranger as Simpson, A Guide
- Warner Richmond as First Mate
- Lionel Belmore as Amos Sewald
- Charles Gemora as Gorilla (uncredited)

== Preservation status ==
The film was released in both a sound version and a silent version for theaters not converted to sound. Both sound and silent versions are lost. The soundtrack, which was recorded separately on Vitaphone disks, may survive in private hands.

== See also ==
- The Lost World (1925)
- King Kong (1933)
- List of early sound feature films (1926–1929)
