= The Love Toy =

1926 film by Erle C. Kenton

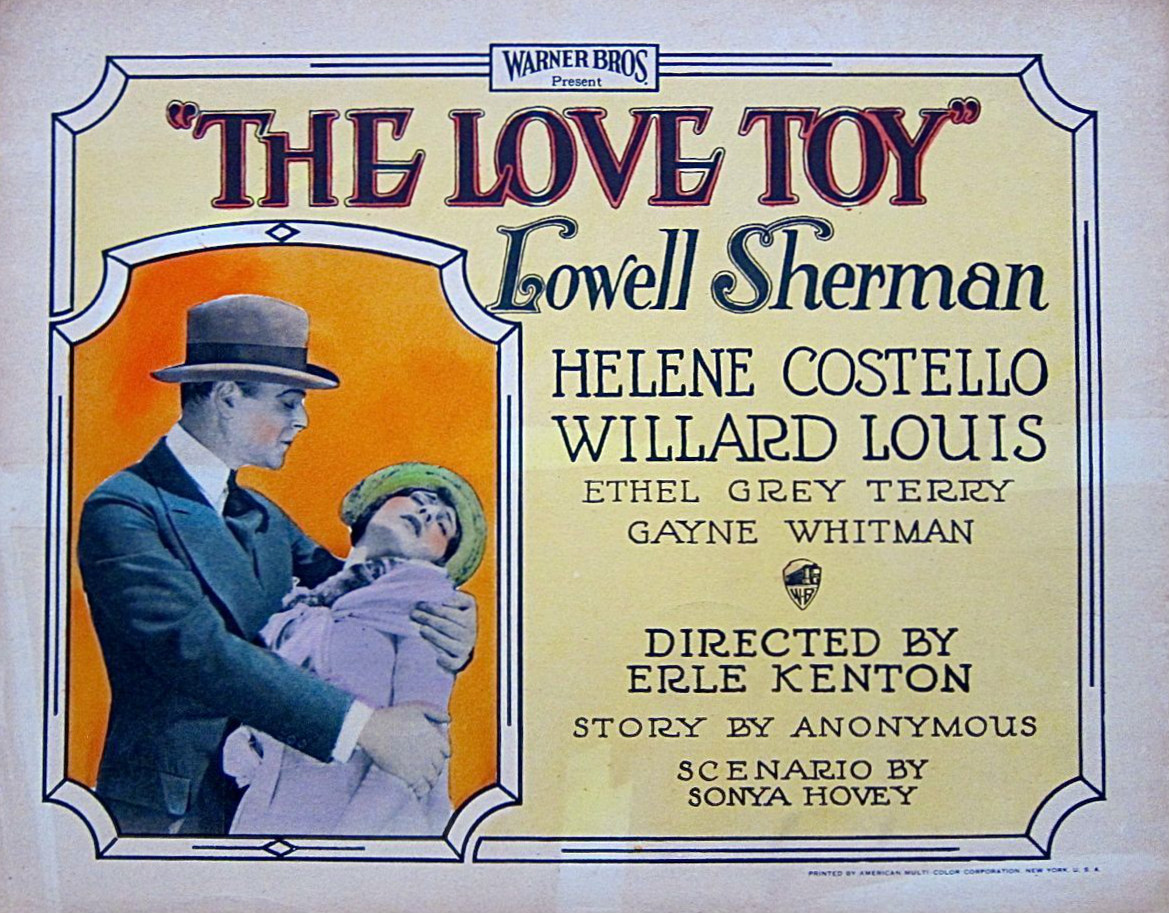
- Lobby card
- Directed by: Erle C. Kenton
- Written by: Charles Logue (story)
- Produced by: Warner Brothers
- Starring: Lowell Sherman; Jane Winton
- Cinematography: John J. Mescall
- Distributed by: Warner Brothers
- Release date: February 13, 1926
- Running time: 60 minutes
- Country: US
- Language: Silent (English intertitles)

The Love Toy is a 1926 American silent comedy film directed by Erle C. Kenton and starring Lowell Sherman, Jane Winton, and Willard Louis. Produced and distributed by Warner Brothers.

== Plot ==
Just before his wedding, Peter Remsen discovers his bride in the arms of another man. He tears up their marriage license. To drown his remorse, he hires himself out to the European kingdom of Luzania, where he becomes a general in its army, helping King Lavoris navigate daily conflicts with Belgradia. After achieving victories in several of these daily wars, the King appoints him as his valet.

Peter saves Princess Patricia from the prime minister, who is attempting to usurp the throne and force her into marriage. Peter subsequently wins the affection of the princess.

== Cast ==
- Lowell Sherman as Peter Remsen
- Jane Winton as The Bride
- Willard Louis as King Lavoris
- Gayne Whitman as Prime Minister
- Ethel Grey Terry as Queen Zita
- Helene Costello as Princess Patricia
- Maude George as Lady in Waiting
- Myrna Loy (bit role; uncredited)

Lowell Sherman and Helene Costello were later married.

== Preservation ==
With no prints of The Love Toy located in any film archives, it is considered a lost film.
