= Yvan Rodic =

Swiss fashion photographer and digital nomad

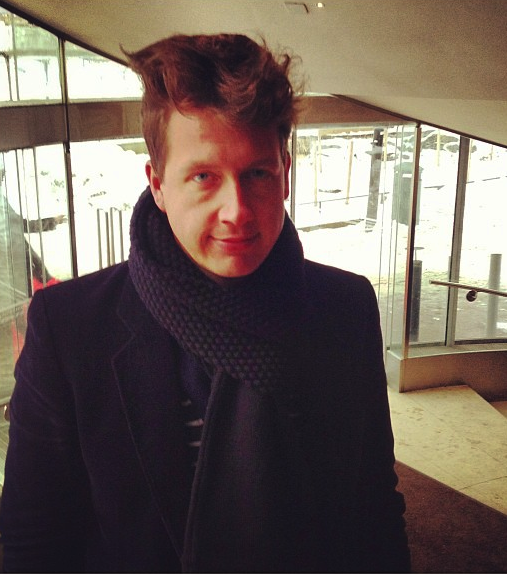
- Rodic at Stockholm Fashion Week, 2013
- Born: 1977 (age 48–49); Vevey Switzerland
- Education: Communication
- Occupation: Streetstyle Photographer
- Known for: FaceHunter

Yvan Rodic, also known as FaceHunter, is a Swiss fashion photographer and digital nomad called "The King of street style photography" by CNN. He travels the world photographing people at cultural and fashion events. He began a blog in 2006, and has since contributed to brands such as Armani, Esprit, and Volvo, among others.

Rodic has published four books with Thames & Hudson: FaceHunter (2010), A Year in The Life of FaceHunter (2013), Travels with Facehunter (2013), and Street Chic (2009),.

== Books ==
- Rodic, Yvan (2010). Facehunter. Thames & Hudson. ISBN 978-2878113495.
- Rodic, Yvan (2013). A Year in The Life of FaceHunter. Thames & Hudson. ISBN 978-0500290873.
