= Merrill Pye =

American art director (1902–1975)

- Born: August 14, 1902
- Died: November 17, 1975 (aged 73); Hollywood, California
- Occupation: Art director
- Years active: 1925–1971

Merrill Pye (August 14, 1902 – November 17, 1975) was an American art director. He was nominated for an Academy Award in the category Best Art Direction for the film North by Northwest.

== Selected filmography ==
- North by Northwest (1959)
- Bombshell (1933)
- Freaks (1932)
