= Part-Time Wife =

Part-Time Wife may refer to:

- Part-Time Wife (1961 film), a British black and white 'B' comedy film
- Part Time Wife (1930 film), an American pre-Code comedy film
- The Part-time Wife, a 1925 American silent drama film
- Part-Time Wife (TV series), a 2026 Indonesian television series
