= Law of the Lawless =

Law of the Lawless may refer to:

- Law of the Lawless (1923 film), an American silent drama film
- Law of the Lawless (1964 film), an American film
- Brigada a.k.a. Law of the Lawless, a 2002 Russian TV miniseries
