= His Master's Voice (1925 film) =

1925 film

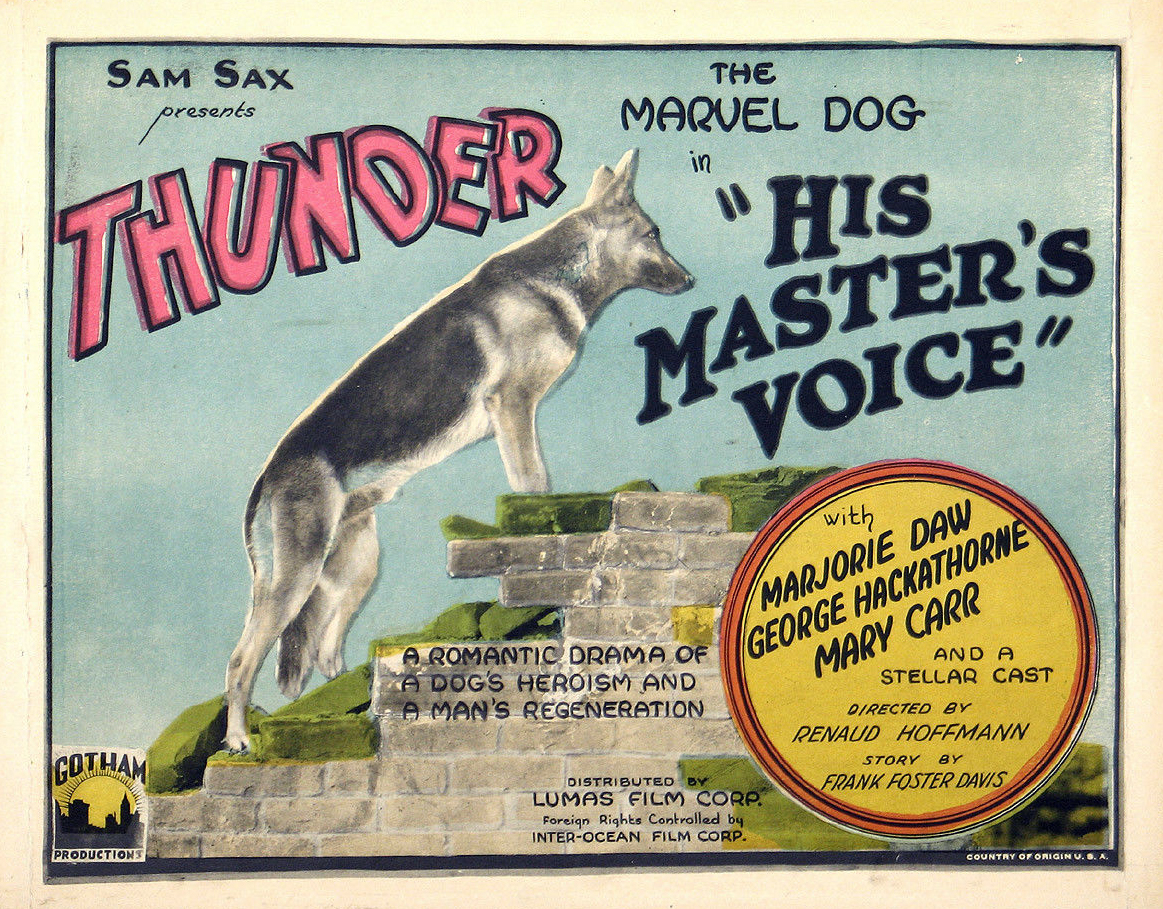
- Directed by: Renaud Hoffman
- Written by: Frank Foster Davis; James J. Tynan; Henry McCarty
- Produced by: Samuel Sax
- Starring: George Hackathorne; Marjorie Daw; Mary Carr
- Cinematography: Jack MacKenzie
- Music by: Joseph E. Zivelli
- Production company: Gotham Pictures
- Distributed by: Lumas Film Corporation
- Release date: October 13, 1925
- Running time: 60 minutes
- Country: United States
- Languages: Silent; English intertitles

His Master's Voice is a 1925 American silent war drama film directed by Renaud Hoffman and starring Thunder the Dog, George Hackathorne, Marjorie Daw and Mary Carr. It was designed as a vehicle for Thunder, an Alsatian who featured in several films during the 1920s.

== Synopsis ==
Following America's entry into World War I, the cowardly Bob Henley is drafted into the army while his faithful dog Thunder joins the Red Cross. They meet again several months later in France where Thunder helps Bob to overcome his terror and fulfil his duty.

== Cast ==
- Thunder the Dog as Thunder
- George Hackathorne as Bob Henley
- Marjorie Daw as Mary Blake
- Mary Carr as Mrs. Henley
- Will Walling as William Marshall
- Brooks Benedict as Jack Fenton
- White Fawn the Dog as White Fawn
- Flash the Dog as Flash - Son of Thunder
- Jack Kenny as Soldier

== Bibliography ==
- Connelly, Robert B. The Silents: Silent Feature Films, 1910-36, Volume 40, Issue 2. December Press, 1998.
- Munden, Kenneth White. The American Film Institute Catalog of Motion Pictures Produced in the United States, Part 1. University of California Press, 1997.
