= Massacre River (film) =

1949 film by John Rawlins

- Directed by: John Rawlins
- Screenplay by: Louis Stevens; Otto Englander
- Based on: When a Man's a Man by Harold Bell Wright
- Produced by: Julian Lesser; Frank Melford
- Starring: Rory Calhoun; Guy Madison; Carole Mathews
- Cinematography: Jack MacKenzie
- Edited by: Richard Cahoon
- Music by: John Leipold; Lucien Moraweck
- Production company: Windsor Pictures
- Distributed by: Allied Artists
- Release date: June 26, 1949
- Running time: 78 minutes
- Country: United States
- Language: English

Massacre River is a 1949 American Western film directed by John Rawlins and starring Rory Calhoun, Guy Madison and Carole Mathews. The film's sets were designed by Lucius O. Croxton. It was distributed by Allied Artists.

== Plot ==
Two cavalry officers clash over the colonel's daughter at a remote outpost with Indian troubles.

== Cast ==
- Guy Madison as 1st. Lt. Larry Knight
- Rory Calhoun as 1st. Lt. Phil Acton
- Johnny Sands as 2nd Lt. Randy Reid
- Art Baker as Col. James Reid
- Carole Mathews as Laura Jordan
- Cathy Downs as Kitty Reid
- Emory Parnell as Sgt. Johnanssen
- Steve Brodie as Burke Kimber
- Iron Eyes Cody as Chief Yellowstone
- Eddy Waller as Joe
- Douglas Fowley as Simms

== Bibliography ==
- Pitts, Michael R. Western Movies: A Guide to 5,105 Feature Films. McFarland, 2012.
