= The Show (1927 film) =

1927 film

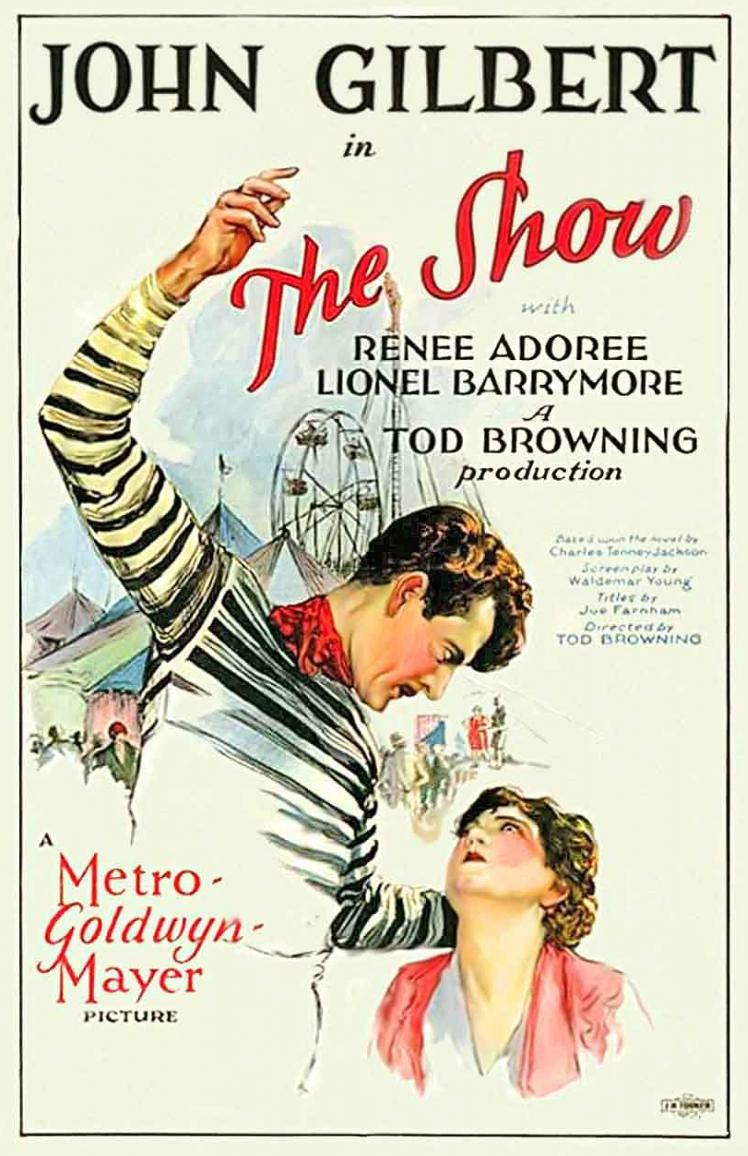
- Theatrical release poster
- Directed by: Tod Browning
- Written by: Joseph Farnham
- Screenplay by: Waldemar Young
- Based on: The Day of Souls by Charles Tenney Jackson
- Produced by: Tod Browning
- Starring: John Gilbert; Renée Adorée; Lionel Barrymore; Zalla Zarana
- Cinematography: John Arnold
- Edited by: Errol Taggart
- Distributed by: Metro-Goldwyn-Mayer
- Release date: January 22, 1927
- Running time: 76 minutes
- Country: United States
- Language: Silent (English intertitles)

The Show is a 1927 American silent drama film directed by Tod Browning, based upon Charles Tenney Jackson's 1910 novel The Day of Souls.

The Show (1927)

== Plot ==
Cock Robin is a sideshow barker in Budapest. He also participates in one of the acts; his former girlfriend Salome dances before Herod in exchange for the head of "Jokanaan". As Jokanaan, Robin has his head seemingly chopped off and presented to the dancer on a platter, much to the delight of the audience.

Salome wants to get back together with Robin, but he has his sights set on Lena, the daughter of a well-off sheep merchant. He lets the smitten Lena buy him things. The Greek, Salome's current boyfriend, becomes angered when he learns of her feelings. The Greek and his henchman, the Ferret, also try to steal Lena's father's money, but fail to find it after they murder him.

That night, a heartbroken Lena tells Robin that her father has been killed. She trustingly shows him the substantial amount of money she had been holding for her father; when Robin ascertains that she has no brothers and that she has many more sheep, he becomes very interested. However, Salome eavesdrops, bursts in and warns Lena that Robin is only after her for her wealth. Lena flees, without her money. Robin is furious and can barely restrain himself from beating Salome.

When Lena shows up at the sideshow with a policeman, Salome has Robin hide in her attic. One day, an old blind man, another resident of the building, comes to Salome to have her read to him another letter from his son; Salome tells him that the man has been promoted to captain and received a decoration. She assures the old man that his son will return someday with his regiment. Later, however, she reveals to Robin that the son is actually in the prison across the street, scheduled to be hanged the next morning. That morning, the old man hears voices in Salome's room and assumes his son has finally come home. Bursting with joy, he mistakes Robin for his son and takes him to his room, where he puts on his old uniform. Then, just after his real son is executed, he passes away.

The Greek first tries to rid himself of his romantic rival by taking the place of the "executioner" and using a real sword to lop off Robin's head, but Salome sees through his disguise and stops him. When Robin goes into hiding, the Greek steals another sideshow attraction, a poisonous lizard, and plants it in Salome's attic.

An official calls on Salome to inform her that she can claim her brother's possessions at the prison; Robin then realizes that the old man was her father. Thoroughly ashamed of himself, Robin reconciles with her. However, the official had spotted him hiding behind the door. When a policeman comes to arrest him, Robin hides in the attic, where the Greek has also been trapped. In the ensuing scuffle, the Greek is bitten by the lizard. Robin takes the money from his dead body and gives it to the policeman. For returning it voluntarily, Robin is let off. He and Salome return to the sideshow. When next they perform the act, she kisses him while his head is on the platter.

== Cast ==
- John Gilbert as Cock Robin
- Renée Adorée as Salome
- Lionel Barrymore as The Greek
- Edward Connelly as The Soldier
- Gertrude Short as Lena
- Russ Powell as Konrad Driskai, the sheep merchant and Lena's Father (uncredited)
- Andy MacLennan as The Ferret, The Greek's Henchman
- Agostino Borgato as Snake Oil Salesman (uncredited)
- Betty Boyd as Neptuna, Mermaids Queen (uncredited)
- Barbara Bozoky as Undetermined Role (uncredited)
- Jules Cowles as Robin's Dressing Aide (uncredited)
- Jacqueline Gadsden as Blonde Barmaid (uncredited)
- Cecil Holland as Undetermined Role (uncredited)
- Bobbie Mack as Sideshow Spectator (uncredited)
- Ida May as Undetermined Role (uncredited)
- Polly Moran as Lady in front in carnival crowd (uncredited)
- Francis Powers as Undetermined Role (uncredited)
- Billy Seay as Little Boy (uncredited)
- Dorothy Seay as Little Girl (uncredited)
- Dorothy Sebastian as Salvation Army Worker (uncredited)
- Eddie Sturgis as Man bitten at snakeshow (uncredited)
- Edna Tichenor as Arachnida, The Human-Spider (uncredited)
- Kit Wain as Undetermined Role (uncredited)
- Zalla Zarana as Zela, the Half-Lady (uncredited)

== Production ==
A print of The Show was donated by MGM to the George Eastman Museum Motion Picture Collection.

== See also ==
- Lionel Barrymore filmography
