= James Mason (American actor) =

American actor (1889–1959)

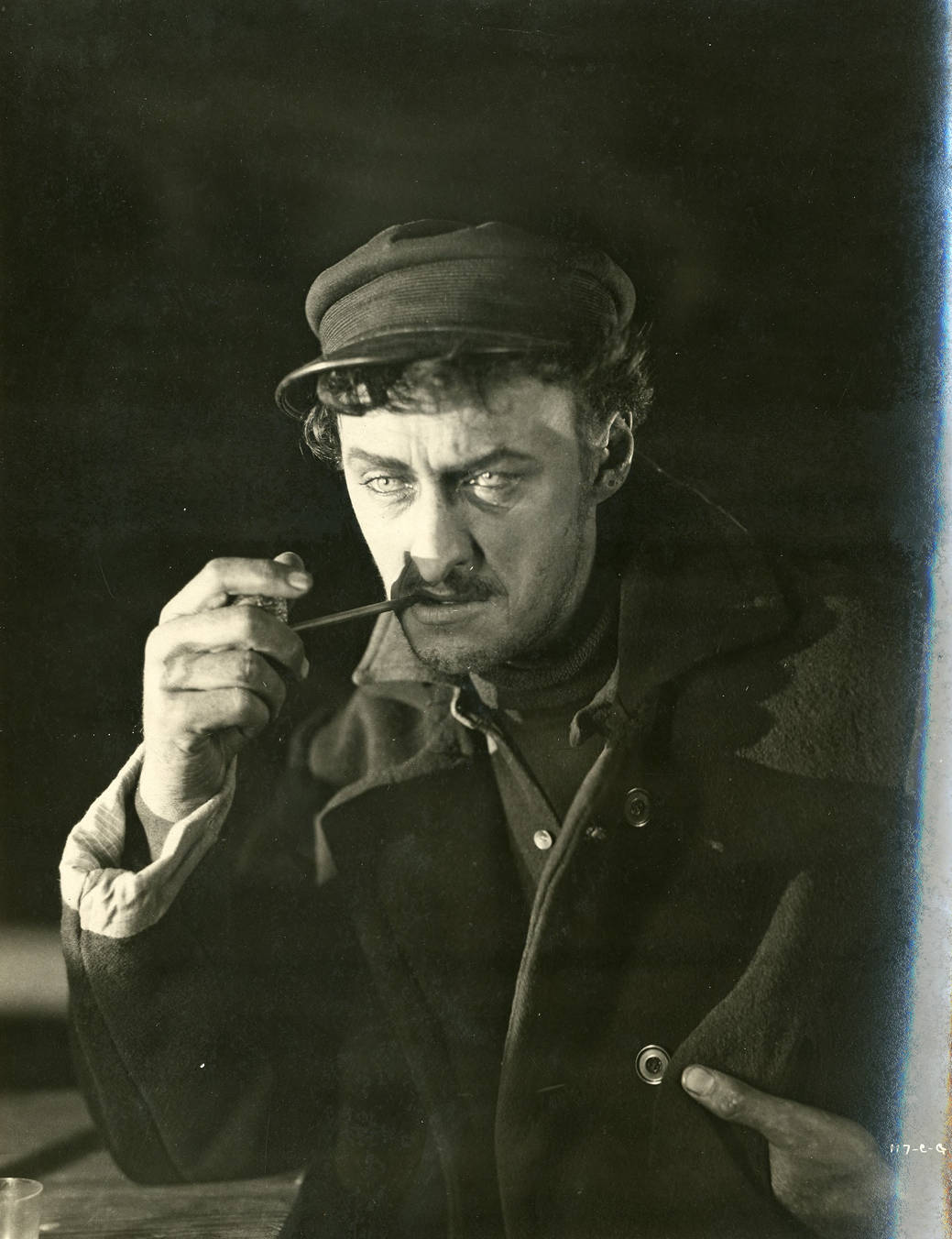
- Mason in 1921
- Born: James Pier Mason; February 3, 1889; Paris, France
- Died: November 7, 1959 (aged 70); Hollywood, California, U.S.
- Occupation: Actor
- Years active: 1914–1952

James Pier Mason (February 3, 1889 – November 7, 1959) was an American actor. He appeared in more than 170 films between 1914 and 1952, often as a villain or henchman in Westerns, and was sometimes credited as Jim Mason. A memorable performance was in 1920's The Penalty as the drug-addicted criminal who shoots Lon Chaney's character Blizzard in the final moments of the film.

== Biography ==
He was born in Paris, France, on February 3, 1889 to James Kent Mason and Katie Evelyn Pier. His parents were from Manhattan, New York City and returned to the United States after his birth. Mason died in Hollywood, California, from a heart attack on November 7, 1959.

== Selected filmography ==
Film	Year
The Good Bad-Man	1916
On the Level	1917
Nan of Music Mountain	1917
Headin' South	1918
The Border Wireless	1918
The Squaw Man	1918
Pettigrew's Girl	1919
Flame of the Desert	1919
The Penalty	1920
Something to Think About	1920
Godless Men	1920
Two Weeks with Pay	1921
The Silent Call	1921
The Fast Mail	1922
Why Worry?	1923
Heritage of the Desert	1924
The Plunderer	1924
Black Lightning	1924
The Flaming Forties	1924
Under the Rouge	1925
Ladies of Leisure	1926
The Phantom of the Forest	1926
Let It Rain	1927
Alias the Lone Wolf	1927
Back to God's Country	1927
Dead Man's Curve	1928
Across to Singapore	1928
A Race for Life	1928
Chicago After Midnight	1928
The Long Long Trail	1929
All Faces West	1929
Fly My Kite	1931
A Lad an' a Lamp	1932
The Dude Ranger	1934
