= Back Fire =

1922 film

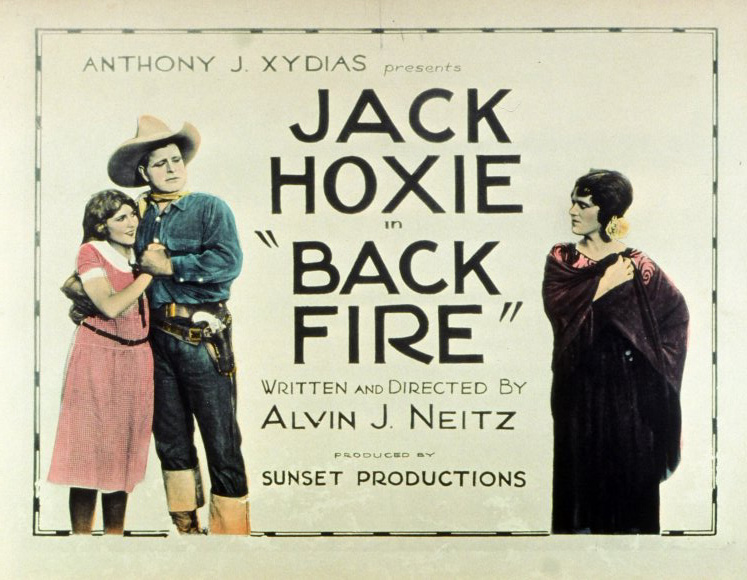
- Theatrical release poster
- Directed by: Alan James
- Written by: Alan James; William Dudley Pelley
- Produced by: Anthony J. Xydias
- Starring: Jack Hoxie; Florence Gilbert; Lew Meehan
- Production company: Sunset Productions
- Distributed by: Aywon Film Corporation
- Release date: November 11, 1922
- Running time: 50 minutes
- Country: United States
- Language: Silent (English intertitles)

Back Fire is a 1922 American silent Western film directed by Alan James and starring Jack Hoxie, Florence Gilbert, and Lew Meehan.

== Plot ==
"Lightning" Carson and a chance acquaintance, Jim Hampton, drift into a little town in the West. Desperately in need of money, Jim suggests that they hold up the Wells-Fargo office. The suggestion is overheard. By chance, the express office is robbed and the two are suspected. Hampton is thrown into jail and "Lightning" pursued by the Sheriff. He meets Jim's sister and falls in love with her. When the Sheriff finally traps "Lightning" it is found he is a Texas Ranger. They join forces and the battle follows between them and the real outlaws. When the bandits are captured "Lightning" claims Jim's sister, Betty. -- Motion Picture News Booking Guide

== Cast ==
- Jack Hoxie as 'Lightning' Carson
- Florence Gilbert as Betty Hampton
- Lew Meehan as Sheriff Baxter
- William Gould as Steve Rollins
- Zalla Zarana as Juanita Rollins
- Milton Ross as Marshal
- Poke Williams as Deputy Hess Collins
- William Berke as Henchman Latigo
- Bert Rollins as Henchman Buck
- George Sowards as Jim Hampton
- Nellie Anderson as Mrs Hampton
