= The Fourflusher =

1928 film

- Directed by: Wesley Ruggles
- Written by: Earle Snell; Albert DeMond
- Produced by: Carl Laemmle
- Starring: Marion Nixon; George J. Lewis; Eddie Phillips
- Cinematography: Ben F. Reynolds
- Edited by: Robert Carlisle
- Production company: Universal Pictures
- Distributed by: Universal Pictures
- Release date: January 8, 1928
- Running time: 60 minutes
- Country: United States
- Languages: Silent; English intertitles

The Fourflusher is a 1928 American silent comedy film directed by Wesley Ruggles and starring George J. Lewis, Marion Nixon and Eddie Phillips. It was produced and distributed by the Universal Pictures. It is a surviving film.

== Cast ==
- George J. Lewis as Andy Wittaker
- Marion Nixon as June Allen
- Eddie Phillips as Robert Riggs
- Churchill Ross as Jerry
- Jimmie Ayre as Toni
- Burr McIntosh as Ira Wittaker
- Otto Hoffman as Mr. Riggs
- Wilfrid North as Mr. Stone
- Knute Erickson as Jeweler
- Patricia Caron as Cashier
- Miriam Fouche
- Hayden Stevenson

== Preservation status ==
- This film is preserved in the EYE Institut Filmmuseum Netherlands collection.
