= The Night Ship =

1925 film

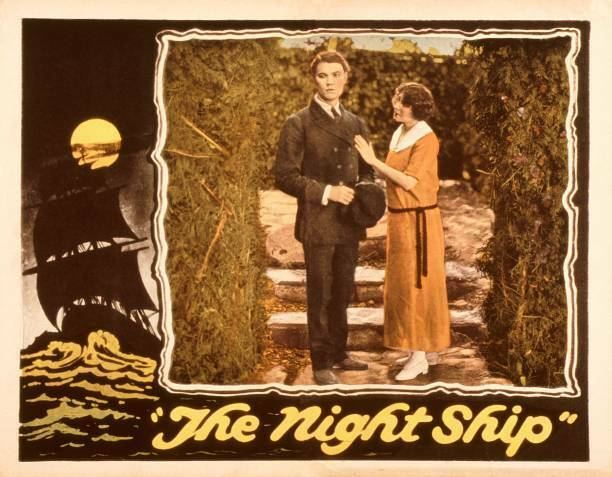
- Directed by: Henry McCarty
- Written by: Henry McCarty
- Produced by: Samuel Sax
- Starring: Mary Carr; Tom Santschi; Robert Gordon
- Cinematography: Jack MacKenzie
- Production company: Gotham Pictures
- Distributed by: Lumas Film Corporation
- Release date: February 1, 1925
- Running time: 60 minutes
- Country: United States
- Languages: Silent; English intertitles

The Night Ship is a 1925 American silent drama film directed by Henry McCarty and starring Mary Carr, Tom Santschi and Robert Gordon.

== Synopsis ==
After sailor Bob Randall returns home to Maine after six years being marooned in the South Seas, he discovers that his sweetheart has married the villainous Captain Jed Hobbs. He vows his revenge and manages to discover that Hobbs is gun running to Central America.

== Cast ==
- Mary Carr as Martha Randall
- Tom Santschi as Captain Jed Hobbs
- Robert Gordon as Bob Randall
- Margaret Fielding as Elizabeth Hobbs
- Charles Sellon as Jimson Weed
- Willis Marks as David Brooks
- Charles W. Mack as Eli Stubbs
- Mary McLain as Janet Hobbs
- L.J. O'Connor as Cassidy
- Julian Rivero as Pedro Lopez

== Preservation ==
The film is currently lost.

== Bibliography ==
- Connelly, Robert B. The Silents: Silent Feature Films, 1910-36, Volume 40, Issue 2. December Press, 1998.
- Munden, Kenneth White. The American Film Institute Catalog of Motion Pictures Produced in the United States, Part 1. University of California Press, 1997.
