= The Phantom of the Forest =

1926 film

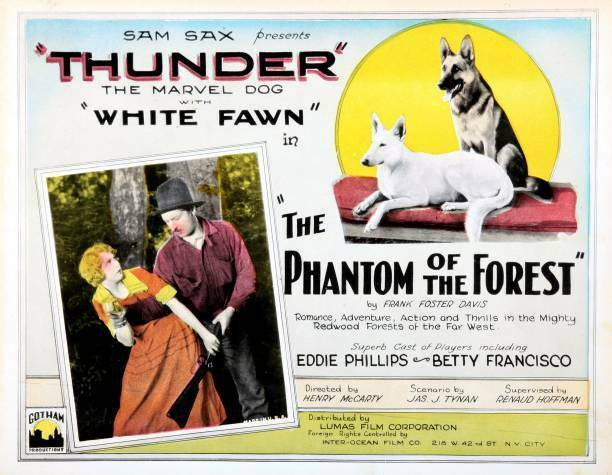
- Lobby card
- Directed by: Henry McCarty
- Written by: Frank Foster Davis; James J. Tynan
- Produced by: Samuel Sax; Renaud Hoffman
- Starring: Thunder the Dog; Betty Francisco; Eddie Phillips; Irene Hunt
- Cinematography: Ray June
- Edited by: Irene Morra
- Production company: Gotham Pictures
- Distributed by: Lumas Film Corporation; Stoll Pictures (UK)
- Release date: January 1926
- Running time: 60 minutes
- Country: United States
- Language: Silent (English intertitles)

The Phantom of the Forest is a 1926 American silent Western film, also classified as a Northern. It is directed by Henry McCarty and stars Thunder the Dog, Betty Francisco and Eddie Phillips. Produced by the independent Gotham Pictures, location shooting took place around the Redwood Forest in Santa Cruz County, California. The film was designed as a vehicle for Thunder, an Alsatian who was featured in several films during the 1920s. It was released in Great Britain the same year by Stoll Pictures.

== Plot ==
As described in a film magazine review, while a pup, Thunder runs wild in the forest, but becomes attached to Helen Taylor, who owns land that has oil prospects and is mortgaged. Certain land speculators plot to seize the property, but are prevented by Frank Wallace who pays the interest. The plotters set fire to the forest. Helen and Frank are trapped, and then escape by a hair's breadth. Thunder fights his way through the flames and rescues a sick child. At the end, Frank and Helen are united.

== Cast ==
- Thunder the Dog as Thunder
- Betty Francisco as Helen Taylor
- Eddie Phillips as Frank Wallace
- Jim Mason as Walt Mingin
- Frank Foster Davis as Joe Deering
- Irene Hunt as Mrs. Deering
- Rhody Hathaway as John Wallace
- White Fawn the Dog as White Fawn

== Preservation ==
Prints of The Phantom of the Forest are located in the Library of Congress and BFI National Archive.

== Bibliography ==
- Connelly, Robert B. The Silents: Silent Feature Films, 1910-36, Volume 40, Issue 2. December Press, 1998.
- Munden, Kenneth White. The American Film Institute Catalog of Motion Pictures Produced in the United States, Part 1. University of California Press, 1997.
