= Lucius O. Croxton =

American art director

- Born: February 14, 1908; New York, United States
- Died: December 1978 (aged 80); American Fork, Utah, United States
- Occupation: Art director
- Years active: 1938–1964 (film)

Lucius O. Croxton (1908–1978) was an American art director. He designed the film sets on a number of Hollywood productions, working for studios such as RKO and Monogram Pictures. He is sometimes credited simply as Lucius Croxton.

== Selected filmography ==
- Nevada (1944)
- The Falcon in Hollywood (1944)
- What a Blonde (1945)
- The Falcon's Alibi (1946)
- The Bamboo Blonde (1946)
- Vacation in Reno (1946)
- San Quentin (1946)
- Beat the Band (1947)
- Code of the West (1947)
- Dick Tracy's Dilemma (1947)
- Seven Keys to Baldpate (1947)
- Wild Horse Mesa (1947)
- Belle Starr's Daughter (1948)
- Michael O'Halloran (1948)
- Roughshod (1949)
- Massacre River (1949)
- The Boy from Indiana (1950)
- Fort Defiance (1951)
- Shack Out on 101 (1955)
- Muscle Beach Party (1964)

== Bibliography ==
- Basinger, Jeanine . Anthony Mann. Wesleyan University Press, 2007.
- Lentz, Robert J. Gloria Grahame, Bad Girl of Film Noir: The Complete Career. McFarland, 1981.
