= The Lodge in the Wilderness =

1926 film

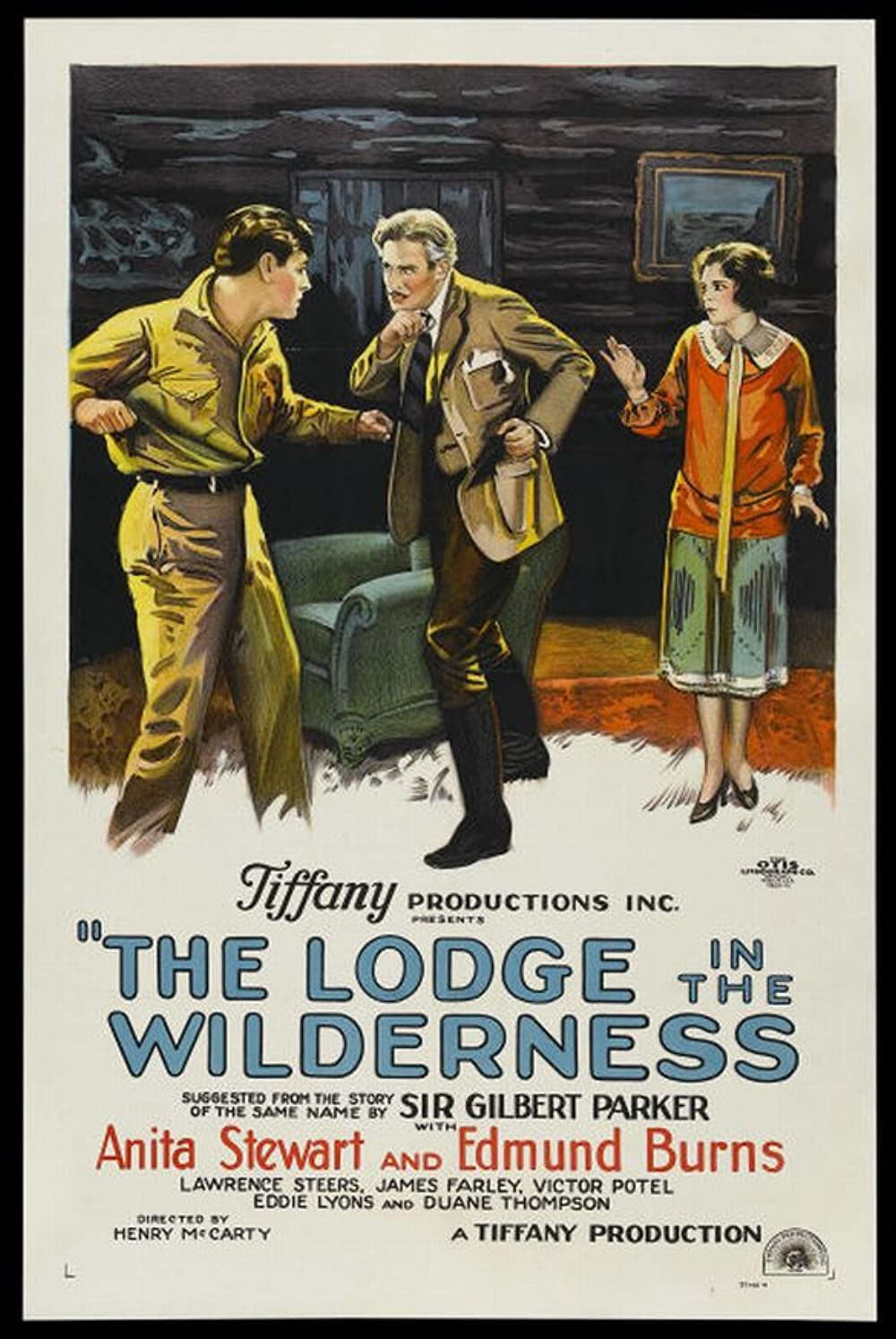
- Film poster
- Directed by: Henry McCarty
- Written by: Wyndham Gittens
- Based on: "The Lodge in the Wilderness" by Gilbert Parker
- Starring: Anita Stewart; Edmund Burns; Larry Steers
- Cinematography: Jack MacKenzie
- Production company: Tiffany Pictures
- Distributed by: Tiffany Pictures
- Release date: July 11, 1926
- Running time: 60 minutes
- Country: United States
- Language: Silent (English intertitles)

The Lodge in the Wilderness is a 1926 American silent action film directed by Henry McCarty and starring Anita Stewart, Edmund Burns, and Larry Steers. It is a Northern film based on a 1909 short story of the same title by Canadian writer Gilbert Parker.

== Plot ==
As described in a film magazine review, John Hammond, the manager of a lumber camp, desires Virginia Coulson, daughter of the owner of the estate, but she is fond of the engineer Jim Wallace. When one of the men is murdered, Jim is held and sent to prison. Later, Hammond secures evidence that proves Goofus, a local halfwit, as the guilty party, but rather than clear his rival, he promises to disclose the evidence only on condition that the young woman will first marry him. When he hears of this scheme, Jim breaks out of jail and arrives in time to stop the marriage. When Goofus learns that Hammond is about to expose him, he shoots Hammond. At the end, Jim and Virginia are free to wed.

== Cast ==
- Anita Stewart as Virginia Coulson
- Edmund Burns as Jim Wallace
- Larry Steers as John Hammond
- Jim Farley as Bill Duncan
- Victor Potel as Goofus
- Eddie Lyons as Buddy O'Brien
- Duane Thompson as Dot Marshall

== Preservation ==
A print of The Lodge in the Wilderness is in the collection of EYE Film Institute Netherlands.

== Bibliography ==
- Connelly, Robert B. The Silents: Silent Feature Films, 1910-36, Volume 40, Issue 2. December Press, 1998.
- Munden, Kenneth White. The American Film Institute Catalog of Motion Pictures Produced in the United States, Part 1. University of California Press, 1997.
