= Eddie Phillips (actor) =

American actor (1899–1965)

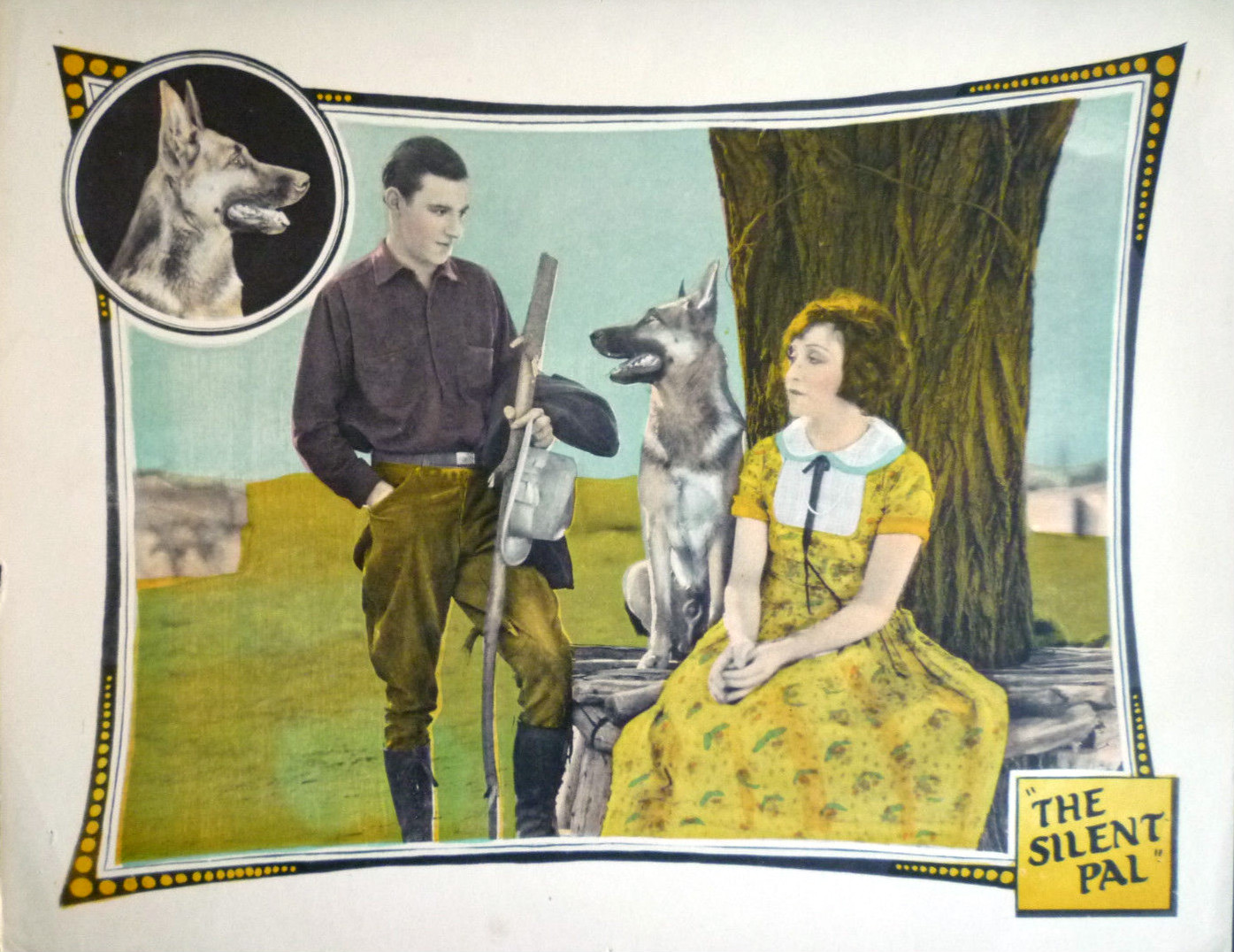
- Lobby card with Phillips and Shannon Day in The Silent Pal (1925)
- Born: August 14, 1899; Philadelphia, Pennsylvania, US
- Died: February 22, 1965 (aged 65); Hollywood, California, US
- Occupation: Actor
- Years active: 1913–1960

Eddie Phillips (August 14, 1899 – February 22, 1965) was an American actor. He appeared in 180 films between 1913 and 1952. He was born in Philadelphia, Pennsylvania, and died in a traffic accident in Hollywood, California.

He started as a child actor and during his career also amassed an extensive list of Broadway and television musical credits; once performing in the Soviet Union. Phillips is prominently featured on the 1960 revival cast recording of Oh, Kay! in the title song and "Fidgety Feet."

He was father to the Broadway performer Eddie Phillips, Jr.

== Partial filmography ==
- The Love Light (1921)
- The Scarab Ring (1921)
- Just Around the Corner (1921)
- The Nth Commandment (1923)
- Lost in a Big City (1923)
- The Fog (1923)
- On the Stroke of Three (1924)
- Through the Dark (1924)
- Flapper Wives (1924)
- Virtue's Revolt (1924)
- On Probation (1924)
- Women Who Give (1924)
- The Plunderer (1924)
- The Beauty Prize (1924)
- Black Lightning (1924)
- Capital Punishment (1925)
- Shattered Lives (1925)
- Silent Pal (1925)
- Wild West (1925)
- Under the Rouge (1925)
- Speed (1925)
- The Mansion of Aching Hearts (1925)
- Footloose Widows (1926)
- The Phantom of the Forest (1926)
- The Little Firebrand (1926)
- Out of the Storm (1926)
- The Bells (1926)
- Paying the Price (1927)
- The Fourflusher (1928)
- We Americans (1928)
- Finders Keepers (1928)
- Honeymoon Flats (1928)
- Lonesome (1928)
- Burning Bridges (1928)
- His Lucky Day (1929)
- Big Boy (1930)
- Dancing Sweeties (1930)
- A Private Scandal (1931)
- Probation (1932)
- Passport to Paradise (1932)
- Night World (1932)
- The Thirteenth Guest (1932)
- The Phantom Express (1932)
- A Strange Adventure (1932)
- Police Call (1933)
- Her Forgotten Past (1933)
- Cross Fire (1933)
- Danger Ahead (1935)
- Adventurous Knights (1935)
- The Millionaire Kid (1936)
- Ambush Valley (1936)
- Wildcat Trooper (1936)
- Born to Fight (1936)
- Texas Trouble Shooters (1942)
- Billy the Kid Trapped (1942)
- Champagne Charlie (1942)
- Any Number Can Play (1948)
- White Heat (1949)
