= Henry McCarty (writer) =

American screenwriter and film director

- Born: January 30, 1882; San Francisco, California, United States
- Died: July 19, 1954 (aged 72); Los Angeles, California, United States
- Occupations: Writer; director
- Years active: 1917–1937 (film)

Henry McCarty (1882–1954) was an American screenwriter and film director. He was employed by several studios including Warner Brothers, RKO, and Gotham Pictures in the silent and early sound eras. He directed eleven silent films between 1922 and 1926, generally for independent companies.

== Selected filmography ==
=== Writer ===
- The Ranger and the Law (1921)
- Blue Blazes (1922)
- The Masked Avenger (1922)
- Silver Spurs (1922)
- Blazing Arrows (1922)
- The Vengeance of Pierre (1923)
- The Night Ship (1925)
- Shattered Lives (1925)
- Silent Pal (1925)
- One of the Bravest (1925)
- The Shadow on the Wall (1925)
- His Master's Voice (1925)
- Hearts and Spangles (1926)
- Sinews of Steel (1927)
- Black Butterflies (1928)
- Ladies' Night in a Turkish Bath (1928)
- The Carnation Kid (1929)
- Blaze o' Glory (1929)
- Señor Americano (1929)
- Song of Love (1929)
- Numbered Men (1930)
- Top Speed (1930)
- Sunny (1930)
- Going Wild (1930)
- Bright Lights (1930)
- The Mad Parade (1931)
- Men of America (1932)
- The Right to Romance (1933)
- Great Guy (1936)
- 23 1/2 Hours Leave (1937)

=== Director ===
- Blazing Arrows (1922)
- Silver Spurs (1922)
- The Vengeance of Pierre (1923)
- Silent Pal (1925)
- The Night Ship (1925)
- Shattered Lives (1925)
- The Part Time Wife (1925)
- Flashing Fangs (1926)
- The Phantom of the Forest (1926)
- The Lodge in the Wilderness (1926)

== Bibliography ==
- Gehring, Wes D. Joe E. Brown: Film Comedian and Baseball Buffoon. McFarland, 2014.
- Goble, Alan. The Complete Index to Literary Sources in Film. Walter de Gruyter, 1999.
- Wlaschin, Ken. Silent Mystery and Detective Movies: A Comprehensive Filmography. McFarland, 2009.
