= Silver Spurs (1922 film) =

1922 film

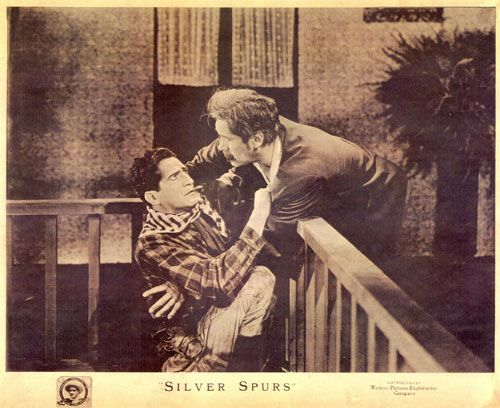
- Directed by: Henry McCarty
- Written by: Lew Meehan; Henry McCarty
- Produced by: Ovid M. Doubleday; Charles W. Mack
- Starring: Lester Cuneo; Bert Sprotte; Zalla Zarana
- Cinematography: Floyd Jackman
- Edited by: Loti Hardwick
- Production company: Doubleday Production Company
- Distributed by: Western Pictures Exploitation Company
- Release date: May 1, 1922
- Running time: 50 minutes
- Country: United States
- Languages: Silent; English intertitles

Silver Spurs is a 1922 American silent Western film directed by Henry McCarty and starring Lester Cuneo, Bert Sprotte and Zalla Zarana.

== Synopsis ==
Bored of life in Manhattan, Craig Hamilton travels west and enjoys a series of adventures.

== Cast ==
- Lester Cuneo as Craig Hamilton
- Lillian Ward as Rosario del Camarillo
- Bert Sprotte as Juan von Rolf
- Zalla Zarana as Carmencita
- Clark Comstock as White Cloud
- Evelyn Selbie as Tehama
- Lafe McKee as Jerry Regan
- Phil Gastrock as Padre Francisco
- Dorris Willott as Nona von Rolf

== Bibliography ==
- Connelly, Robert B. The Silents: Silent Feature Films, 1910-36, Volume 40, Issue 2. December Press, 1998.
- Munden, Kenneth White. The American Film Institute Catalog of Motion Pictures Produced in the United States, Part 1. University of California Press, 1997.
