= Thunder (dog) =

German Shepherd and actor

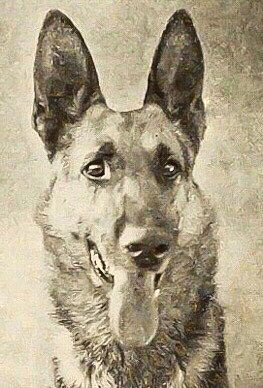
- Thunder in 1925
- Species: Canis lupus familiaris
- Breed: German Shepherd
- Sex: Male
- Born: (Beneva) Tillo von Riedekenburg; September 7, 1921; Stuttgart, Germany
- Died: Date undetermined California; United States
- Occupation: Actor
- Years active: 1923–1927
- Owners: Frank Foster Davis; 1891–1976

Thunder the Dog (also credited as Thunder the Marvel Dog; born September 7, 1921 – death after October 1928) was a male German Shepherd that performed in American silent films from 1923 through 1927. Although Thunder's filmography is rather brief, his six- and seven-reel features were much longer and more elaborate than the films in which many of his fellow canine actors appeared during the silent era. His releases did, though, have to compete in the 1920s with other feature films starring rival German Shepherds such as Peter the Great, Napoleon, Rex, and, most notably, Strongheart and Rin Tin Tin. During his career, Thunder worked for Paramount, Gotham Pictures, and Fox Film Corporation; and he shared screen time with Clara Bow, Dorothy Dalton, William Russell, Caryl Lincoln, and other prominent actors of the period.

== Early life ==
Thunder was born in Stuttgart, Germany in 1921. Little is known about the German Shepherd's journey to the United States or how Frank Foster Davis—the dog's owner and trainer—acquired the animal. It is known that Davis, a native of Louisville, Kentucky, moved to California prior to 1921. There, at Altadena, he developed the largest kennel for German Shepherds on the Pacific Coast, and it is where Thunder resided during and after his screen career. News items in 1926 issues of Motion Picture News and Fox Folks did report that Thunder was registered with the American Kennel Club under the name "Beneva Tillo Von Riedekenberg" and that his pedigree papers traced his bloodline in Germany back 38 generations. Thunder by 1923 also had a connection to a film star through his "litter brother" named "Thor", who that year was purchased from Davis by comedian Buster Keaton.

== Film career ==
One of numerous dog stars of the silent era, Thunder was among a "wave of German Shepherds" that came to the United States in the years following World War I. He and his entire breed at that time were commonly referred to in the American film industry and elsewhere as "police dogs", an identification reportedly dating to 1904, when German police departments began using the Deutscher Schäferhund in local law enforcement. While the German Shepherd does have a well-documented history with civilian police forces, the dog was initially bred and trained for service in the German army as early as 1899.

When Thunder began working in films in 1923, he found himself frequently compared to other well-established police-dog stars, the most prominent being Strongheart and Rin Tin Tin. Adrienne L. McLean in her 2014 work Cinematic Canines: Dogs and Their Work in Fiction Film recounts how German Shepherds dominated the casting of "'dog heroes'" in American films, especially during the 1920s. A survey of cast listings from that decade reveals that at least 14 dogs performed in leading roles in motion pictures, and German Shepherds accounted for 12 of that number, including Thunder.

=== Paramount, 1923 ===
Thunder's screen debut was in the now-lost 1923 Paramount drama The Law of the Lawless starring Dorothy Dalton and French actor Charles de Rochefort. Uncredited in the film, the dog was identified then in trade publications as "Beneva", his first name in his AKC registration. That name was associated as well with where Beneva lived, at Frank Davis's kennel in California. In a March 1923 news report about a dog show in Pasadena, California, the Los Angeles Times refers to Davis as "the owner of the Beneva Police Dog Kennels" in Altadena.

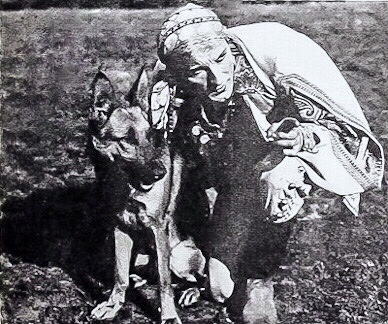
"Beneva" (later Thunder) with actor Charles de Rochefort in The Law of the Lawless (1923)

Beneva became involved in The Law of the Lawless when the film's director, Victor Fleming, needed a "'wolf dog'" for a small part, and he asked Davis to provide a suitable animal. Davis furnished Beneva, who immediately impressed both cast and crew with his intelligence and temperament. Dorothy Dalton was so amazed by the dog's abilities that she asked Fleming to revise the script and add more action scenes with the German Shepherd. The director agreed, and he and his screenwriter solicited plot input from Davis, who had experience in writing "dog stories". As originally scripted, Beneva's minor role was to require his presence on set for only two days; the expanded part kept the dog working the full six weeks of the film's production.

=== Black Lightning, 1924 ===
After Beneva's uncredited performance in The Law of the Lawless, Gotham Pictures cast him to star in its 1924 feature Black Lightning with the new screen name "Thunder the Marvel Dog". Gotham also contracted actress Clara Bow to perform with him in a "supporting" role. The film received generally high marks in trade publication reviews; but, more importantly, the vast majority of theater owners and audiences enjoyed Thunder's performance. Theater owner Herbert Shaw in Morgantown, West Virginia judged Black Lightning to be "The best dog picture produced in some time. Much better than Strongheart and Rin Tin Tin." T. L. Barnett, owner of Finn's Theatre in Jewett City, Connecticut, agreed. "I think", Barnett declared, "that Thunder is more of an actor than either Strongheart or Rin-Tin-Tin". In Phoenix, The Arizona Republican newspaper also credited Thunder with "doing some of the best acting ever done by an animal on the screen." Such positive reactions to Black Lightning convinced Gotham to develop several more films starring the new police dog.

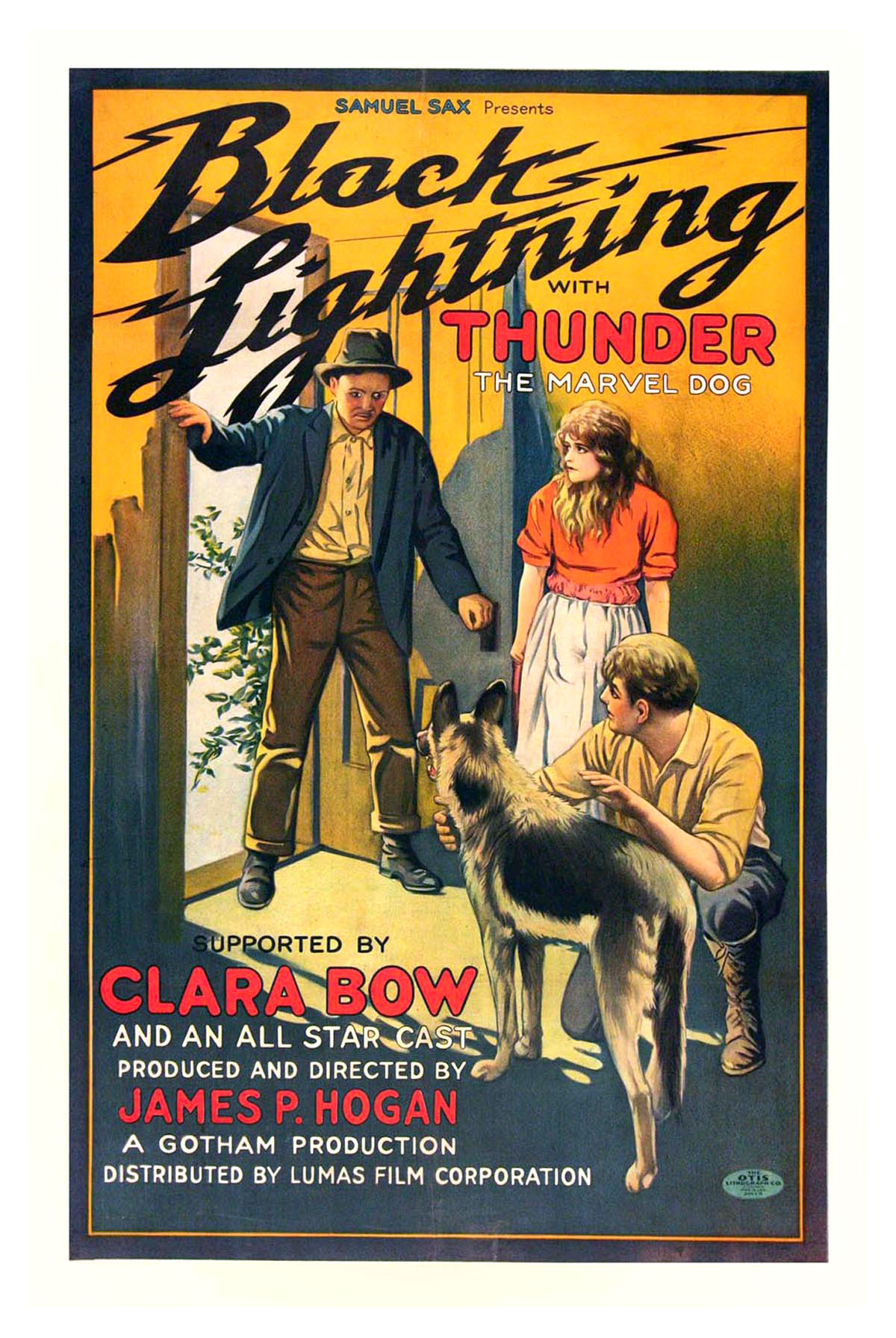
Thunder's first starring role "supported by Clara Bow", 1924

The plot of Black Lighting includes scenes of Thunder saving a wounded soldier "from the firing line" at the Battle of Verdun in France during World War I. To help promote the new dog hero, Gotham and some media outlets freely incorporated the war-related elements of Black Lightning into Thunder's own biography and fabricated tales of his duties and heroism at the real battle. George T. Pardy in his review of the film in the November 29, 1924 issue of Exhibitors Trade Review encourages theater owners to use Thunder as the "main object of your exploitation" and to tout his many "feats of valor" at Verdun. Since Thunder's pedigree records show that his birth occurred nearly three years after the war ended, any allusions to such "feats" in that issue or in any other period publication are indeed fraudulent.

=== Additional Gotham releases, 1925–1927 ===
Thunder's next film, The Silent Pal, continued to increase his popularity. The Exhibitors Trade Review described the May 1925 release as "A RATTLING good picture for the family" and its canine star as "marvelously sagacious". "You never get the impression", the trade journal reported, "that Thunder is being 'coached' to do things, he moves and acts so naturally." The publication then highlights a few of Thunder's action sequences in the film: "Among some of his best stunts are the successful tracking down of a lost child, rescuing a tiny girl at the edge of a cliff, the scene in which he grabs and halts a runaway horse on the saddle of which the heroine is helplessly clinging; and a terribly realistic fight he engages in with the half-cast villain."

Thunder's next two productions for Gotham—His Master's Voice in 1925 and The Phantom of the Forest in 1926—were based on stories originally written by Frank Davis, who as the dog's owner and trainer was increasingly being recognized in the media as "America's greatest expert on police dogs". In both of those films Davis added a rare, pure-white female German Shepherd to the cast as a mate for Thunder. Known as "White Fawn" and also owned and trained by Davis, her addition intended to enhance Thunder's personal story by imitating the earlier on-screen pairing of his film rival Strongheart with a "wife, Lady Jule", in the 1924 production The Love Master.

Thunder's fifth and last film for Gotham, The Silent Avenger, was released between two features he did for Fox Films. The widely read entertainment paper Variety described the six-reeler as "a usual dog story" but with a limited number of action sequences reserved for the final reel, including an "excellently staged battle between the dog and a tame or trained bear".

=== Fox Films, 1926–1927 ===
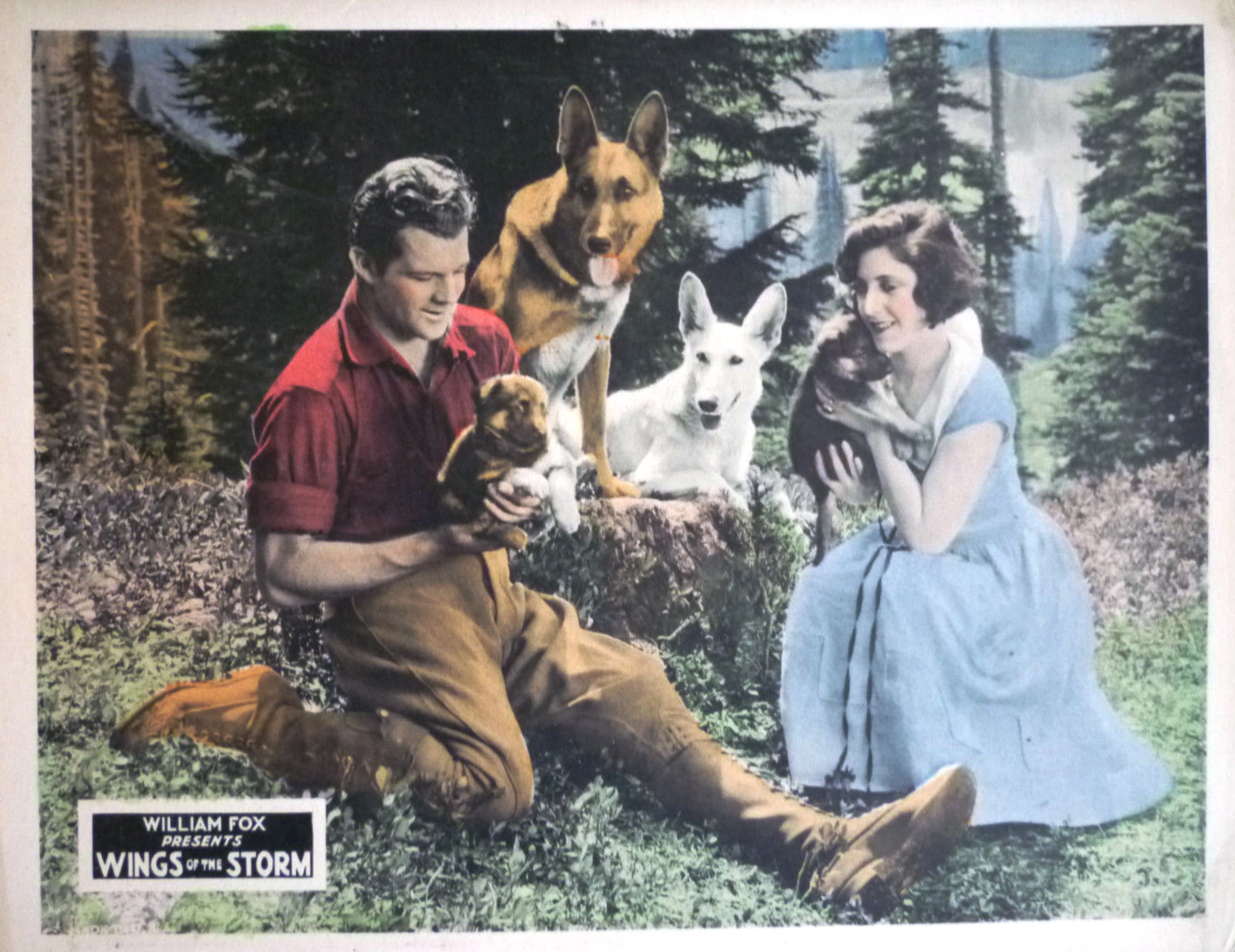
Lobby card showing Thunder and White Fawn watching actors hold their puppies in Wings of the Storm (1926)

While Gotham produced most of Thunder's films, Fox developed two of his last three pictures: Wings of the Storm, released in November 1926, and Wolf Fangs, his final film, released a year later. Thunder still impressed theatergoers in his farewell performance in Wolf Fangs. The St. Petersburg Times summarized the 1927 film as a "novel situation of a puppy lost among the wolves and raised as one of their pack." The Florida newspaper's reviewer marveled again how the dog exhibited "almost human intelligence" and "amazes every member of the audience" with his stunts. Wolf Fangs also includes the fourth and final appearance of Thunder's "beautiful mate" White Fawn.

Thunder's last film was released when the number of dog-hero films was beginning to decline in the closing years of the silent era. A witness to that decline, Frank Davis described in a 1963 interview how "When sound came in, dog pictures went out." In fact, trade publications even by 1925 were reporting an overabundance of canine actors in the film industry, as well as signs of dog-picture fatigue at some production companies. In its April 1, 1925 issue, Variety mentions Thunder in its remarks about the glut of trained dogs seen in casting offices and on studio lots:

Since the success of such screen canine stars as Rin-Tin-Tin, Strongheart and Thunder, propective dog stars have cropped up by the dozens, according to the men who have turned in photographs and alleged stunts their dogs can do. One casting office has enough trained dogs on its list to start a dog circus were they all put together under one tent. The principal dogs before the public now bring their owners in comfortable weekly stipends.

Some public reactions to Thunder's final release provide further evidence that dog-centered action films had indeed peaked in popularity by the late 1920s. After he presented Wolf Fangs in his theater in Louisville, Nebraska in 1928, Frank Johnson reported in the Exhibitors Herald and Moving Picture World that the Fox drama, while "suitable", had "Just a bit too much dog and not enough human acting".

Dog heroes, such as Rin Tin Tin, continued to star or costar in features, featurettes, and shorts into the 1930s and beyond, just in less numbers than in the silent era. One other later star was "Flash the Wonder Dog", a character who first appeared as a puppy in His Master's Voice and is credited as a "son of Thunder". There is, however, no documentation that links Flash genetically to Thunder either as that film puppy or later as a different, fully grown canine star for Metro-Goldwyn-Mayer.

== Later life and owner's death ==
Thunder's life after his film career is largely undocumented, including the year and exact location of his death. Based on the projected life expectancy for German Shepherds cited by The American Kennel Club and The Kennel Club of the United Kingdom, Thunder's death likely occurred before 1936. After the "Marvel Dog's" departure from films, Frank Davis continued to operate his Beneva Kennel in Altadena, but no cast listings after 1927 indicate that he trained any other dogs to work in motion pictures. Thunder did have offspring, including two daughters who died in December 1928. With further regard to Davis, he remained active in the canine world for decades, also producing radio programs with dog-related themes and serving as a judge in many regional and national breed shows. By the early 1960s, he had left California and relocated to Alexandria, Virginia, where he died at age 85 in 1976.

== Filmography ==
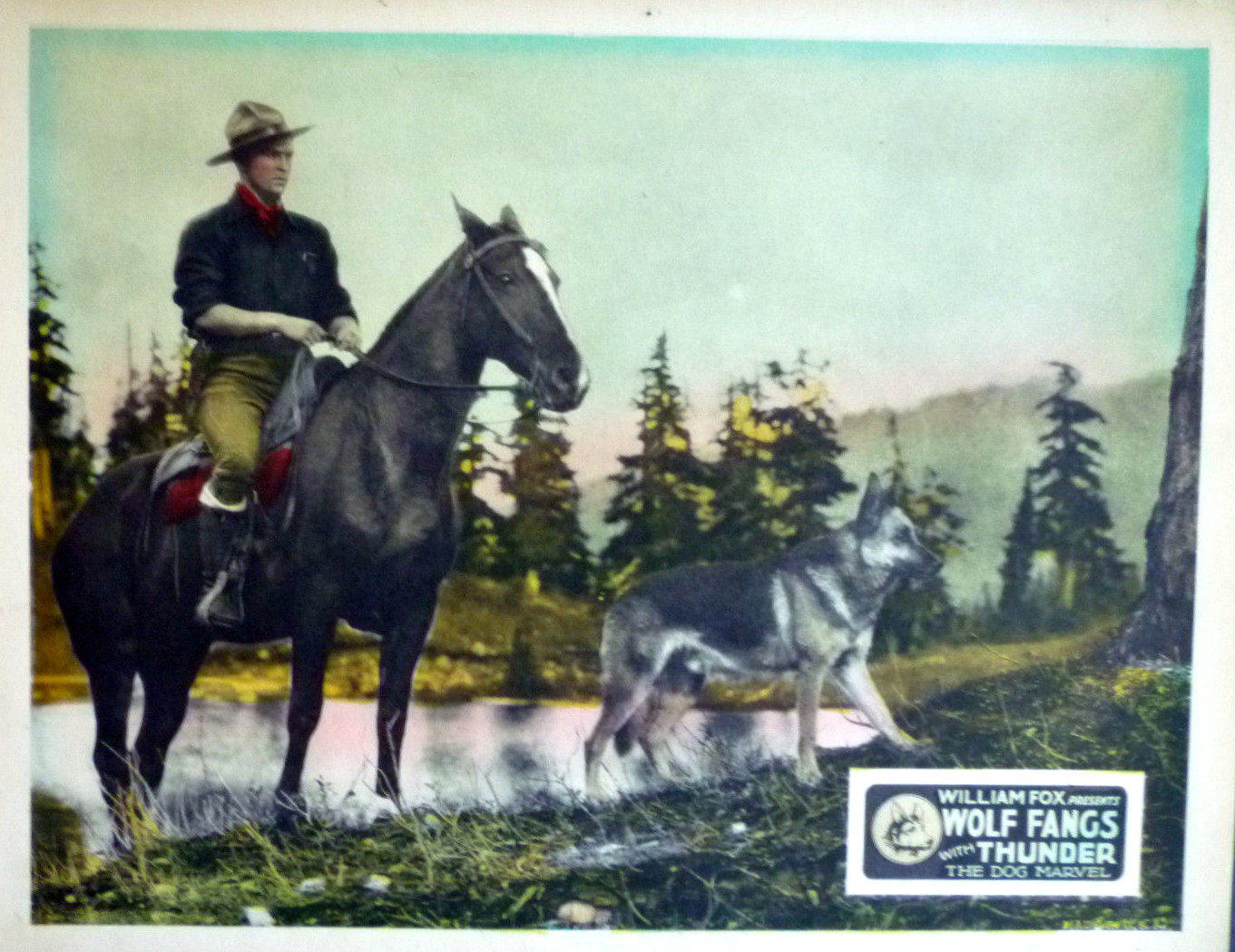
Lobby card for Thunder's final film, Wolf Fangs (1927)

- Law of the Lawless (1923)
- Black Lightning (1924)
- Silent Pal (1925)
- His Master's Voice (1925)
- The Phantom of the Forest (1926)
- Wings of the Storm (1926)
- The Silent Avenger (1927)
- Wolf Fangs (1927)

== See also ==
- List of individual dogs
