= Under the Rouge =

1925 film

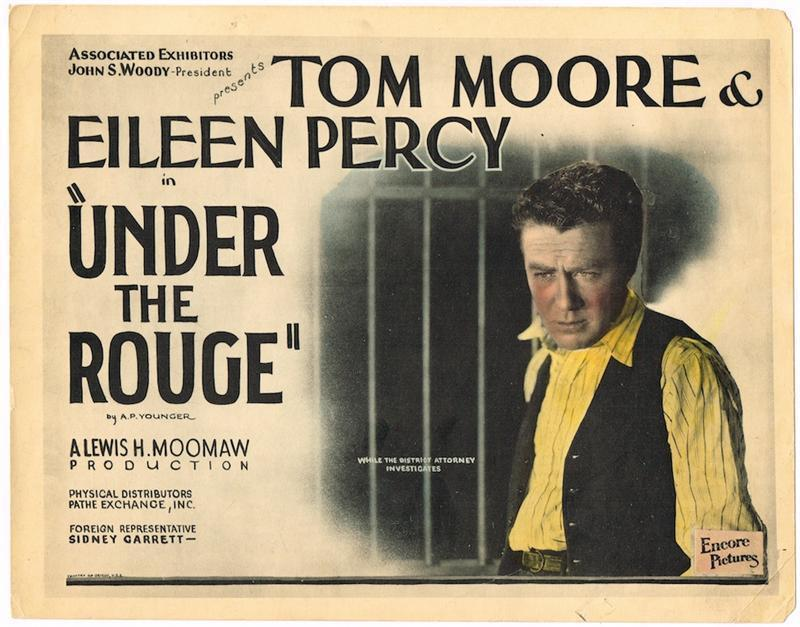
- Lobby card
- Directed by: Lewis H. Moomaw
- Written by: Andrew Percival Younger
- Produced by: Lewis H. Moomaw
- Starring: Eileen Percy; Tom Moore; Eddie Phillips
- Cinematography: Hobart H. Brownell; King D. Gray; John M. La Mond
- Production company: Encore Pictures
- Distributed by: Associated Exhibitors
- Release date: October 18, 1925
- Running time: 60 minutes
- Country: United States
- Language: Silent (English intertitles)

Under the Rouge is a 1925 American silent drama film directed by Lewis H. Moomaw and starring Eileen Percy, Tom Moore and Eddie Phillips. After being arrested for safe-breaking, a man goes home to try and patch things up with his former girlfriend.

== Plot ==
As described in a film magazine reviews, Kitty and Whitey are drawn into the criminal underworld by circumstances although basically they are of fine metal. When the war comes, Whitey receives military decorations for bravery. Returning home to the United States, he is again tempted to enter his old haunts. Kitty is now a beautiful young woman. Although Whitey has always loved her, she regards him like a brother. Whitey and his pal Skeeter are caught during a robbery. Skeeter is killed and Whitey is convicted. But a friendly detective urges him to “go straight” and secures his release. Kitty has become friends with Martha who, it is learned, is Skeeter’s mother. Fred, cashier of the bank and a visitor at the house, has fallen in love with her. Whitey finally locates Kitty and learns that Martha is the mother of his pal Skeeter. He tells her that her boy died fighting in his arms and relinquishes his Croix de Guerre as having been Skeeter’s. Martha adopts him and he secures a job at the bank. Fred is dishonest and is planning to fix an embezzlement at the bank, of which he is guilty, on Whitey, counting on his past record. Whitey exposes him, rescues Kitty from a hazardous death, and in the end they are happily united.

== Cast ==
- Eileen Percy as Kitty
- Tom Moore as Whitey
- Eddie Phillips as Skeeter
- James Mason as Mal
- Claire de Lorez as Daisy
- William V. Mong as Doc Haskell
- Chester Conklin as Mr. Fleck
- Aileen Manning as Mrs. Fleck
- Stanley Blystone as Jim Condon
- Peggy Prevost as Maybelle
- Frank Clark as Simmons
- Mary Alden as Martha Maynard
- Bruce Guerin as Little Tommy
- Carmelita Geraghty as Evelyn
- Tom Gallery as Fred Morton

== Production ==
Under the Rouge was filmed on location in Portland, Oregon.

== Bibliography ==
- Monaco, James. The Encyclopedia of Film. Perigee Books, 1991. ISBN 0-399-51606-9
