= London After Midnight (film) =

Lost 1927 American silent film

- Theatrical release poster
- Directed by: Tod Browning
- Written by: Waldemar Young (scenario); Joseph W. Farnham (titles)
- Based on: "The Hypnotist" by Tod Browning
- Produced by: Tod Browning; Irving Thalberg (uncredited)
- Starring: Lon Chaney; Marceline Day; Conrad Nagel; Henry B. Walthall; Polly Moran; Edna Tichenor; Claude King
- Cinematography: Merritt B. Gerstad
- Edited by: Harry Reynolds; Irving Thalberg (uncredited)
- Production company: Metro-Goldwyn-Mayer
- Distributed by: Metro-Goldwyn-Mayer
- Release date: December 3, 1927
- Running time: 69 minutes 47 mins (TCM reconstructed version)
- Country: United States
- Language: Silent (English intertitles)
- Budget: $151,666.14
- Box office: $1,004,000 (worldwide rentals)

London After Midnight (original working title: The Hypnotist) is a lost 1927 American silent mystery horror film directed and co-produced by Tod Browning and starring Lon Chaney, with Marceline Day, Conrad Nagel, Henry B. Walthall, and Polly Moran. The film was distributed by Metro-Goldwyn-Mayer, and was written by Waldemar Young, based on the story "The Hypnotist" which was written by Browning. Merritt B. Gerstad was the cinematographer, and the sets were designed by Cedric Gibbons and Arnold Gillespie. Harry Sharrock was the assistant director. The film cost $152,000 to produce and grossed $1 million (equivalent to $19,000,000 in 2025). Chaney's real-life make-up case can be seen in the last scene of the film sitting on a table, the only time it ever appeared in a film.

The last known copy of the film was destroyed in the 1965 MGM vault fire, making it one of the most sought-after lost silent films. In 2002, Turner Classic Movies aired a reconstructed version, produced by Rick Schmidlin, using the original script and numerous film stills to recreate the original plot. Browning remade the film as a sound film in 1935, as Mark of the Vampire, starring Bela Lugosi.

== Plot ==
Roger Balfour is found dead in his London home one night. Burke, a representative of Scotland Yard, after questioning everyone present, declares the death a suicide despite objection from Balfour's neighbour and close friend, Sir James Hamlin.

Five years later, strange lights are seen within the now-forsaken Balfour mansion. The new tenants are two vampiric figures of a man in a beaver-felt top hat with long hair and sharp teeth, and a silent pale woman wearing long robes. This prompts the baronet, Sir James, to call Burke in once again. Burke discovers that Hamlin and the others there (Balfour's daughter, Lucille; his butler, Williams; and Hamlin's nephew, Arthur Hibbs) had been the only other persons in the Balfour home when he died. After noticing the new lease to the Balfour mansion bears the exact same signature as the deceased Roger Balfour's, Burke remains skeptical about the existence of the undead, and, along with Sir James, exhumes Roger Balfour's tomb to find it empty. After a series of grisly events—including the maid Miss Smithson's eccentric recollection of encountering the Man in the Beaver Hat manifesting in a bedroom, the vampire girl flying down like a bat from the ceiling of the Balfour mansion, and witnessing the living corpse of Roger Balfour—Burke reveals to Lucille that he now believes her father to have been murdered.

After precautions are taken to protect Lucille's bedroom from vampires, the girl is taken to the Balfour mansion. Sir James is instructed to venture to the mansion, where he encounters the Man in the Beaver Hat (revealed to be Burke) and is hypnotized into thinking it is five years earlier. Within the mansion, the events leading up to Balfour's death are recreated and re-enacted and all secretly watch as Sir James kills Roger Balfour and fakes his suicide so as to ultimately marry Balfour's daughter Lucille, against the deceased's wishes. Once apprehended, Burke lifts the trance and identifies Sir James as the killer.

== Cast ==
- Lon Chaney as Professor / Inspector Edward C. Burke / The Man In The Beaver Hat
- Marceline Day as Lucille Balfour
- Claude King as Roger Balfour / The Stranger
- Polly Moran as Miss Smithson, The New Maid
- Conrad Nagel as Arthur Hibbs
- Edna Tichenor as The Bat Girl
- Henry B. Walthall as Sir James Hamlin
- Percy Williams as Williams, Balfour's Butler
- Andy MacLennan as Bat Girl's Assistant
- Jules Cowles as The Gardener
- Allan Cavan as The Estate Agent

== Production ==
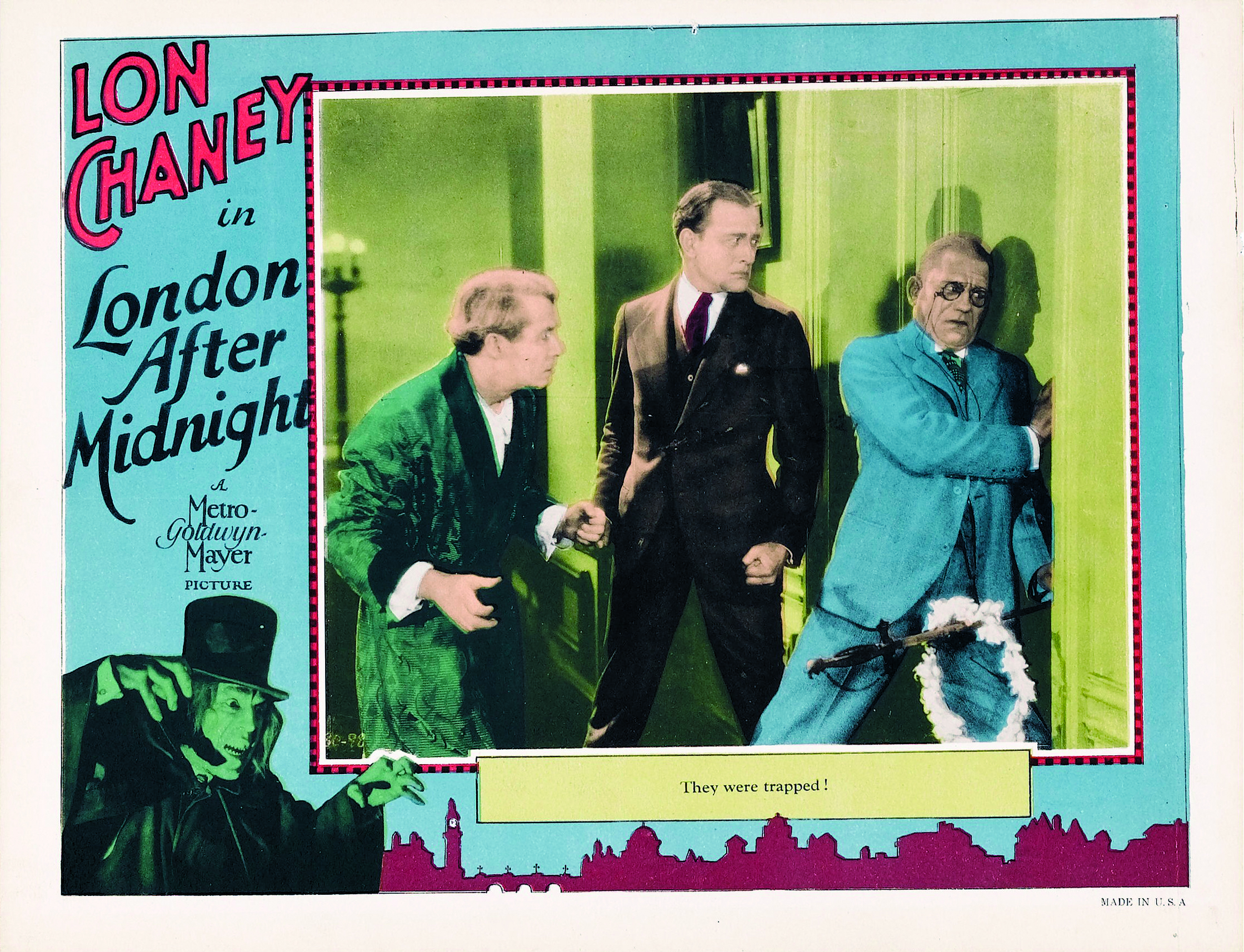
Original lobby card

Lon Chaney's makeup for the film included sharpened teeth and the hypnotic eye effect, achieved with special wire fittings which he wore like monocles. Based on surviving accounts, he purposefully gave the "vampire" character an absurd quality, because it was the film's Scotland Yard detective character, also played by Chaney, in a disguise. Surviving stills show this was the only time Chaney used his famous makeup case as an on-screen prop.

The story was an original work by Tod Browning, with Waldemar Young, who had previously worked with Browning on The Unholy Three and The Unknown, as the scenario writer. Young was previously employed as a journalist in San Francisco, during which time he covered several famous murder investigations, a distinction which saw him lauded as knowing "mystery from actual experience."

In adding an authenticity to both Chaney's character and the atmosphere within the haunted house scenes, bats, armadillos, and owls were used.

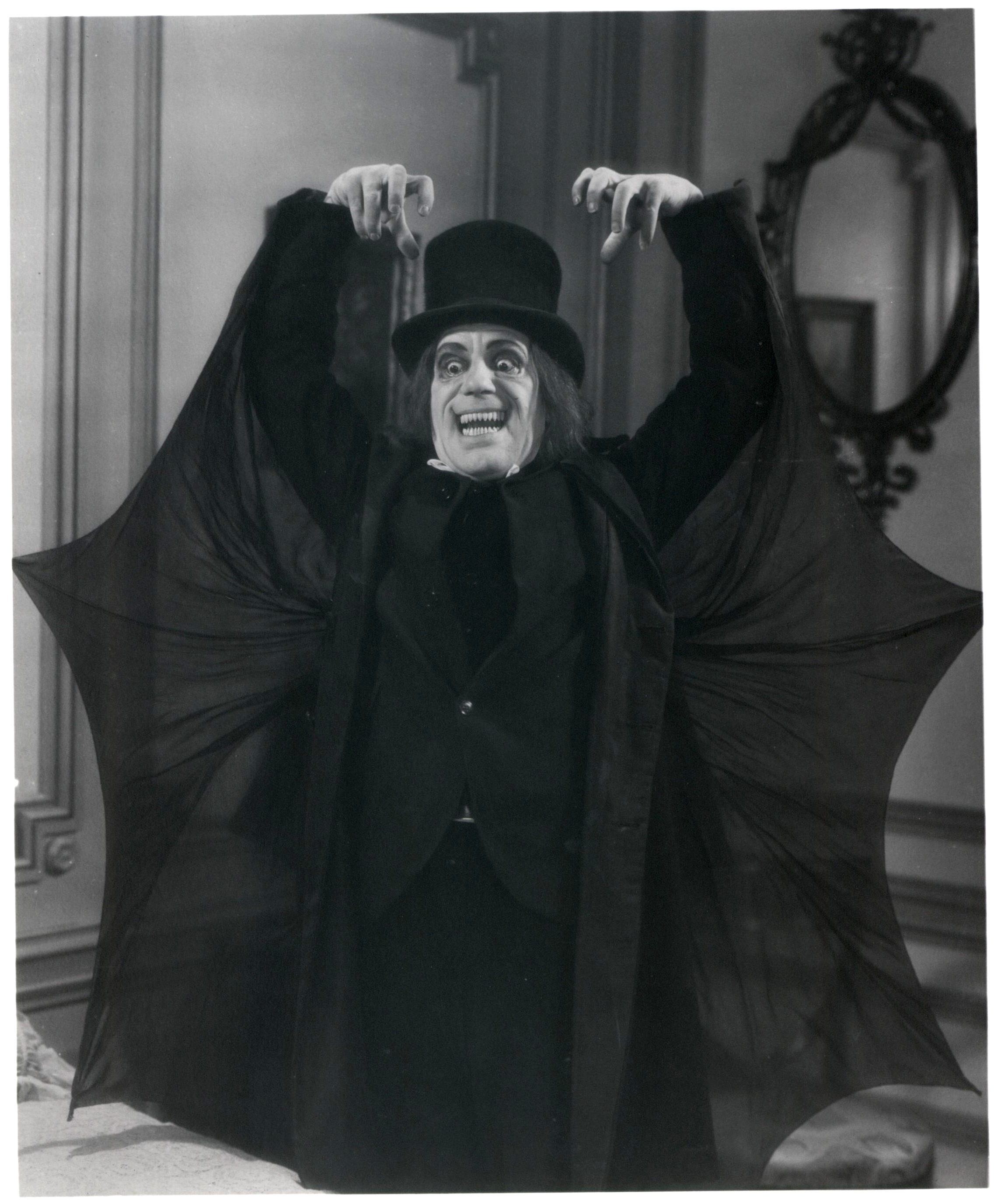
Lon Chaney, bat pose, in London After Midnight

When London After Midnight premiered at the Miller Theater in Missouri, set musicians Sam Feinburg and Jack Feinburg had to prepare melodies to go with the film's supernatural elements. The musicians used Ase's Todd and Eritoken by Greig, Dramatic Andante by Rappe, the Fire Music from Wagner's The Valkyrie along with other unlisted aspects of Savino, Zimonek and Puccini.

== Release ==
Metro-Goldwyn-Mayer released London After Midnight theatrically in the United States on December 3, 1927.

== Reception ==
=== Box office ===
According to MGM records London After Midnight earned $721,000 in theater rentals from the United States and Canada and an additional $283,000 from foreign rentals, giving the studio a profit of $540,000.

=== Critical response ===
It became the most successful collaborative film between Chaney and Browning, but it received mixed reviews from critics. The storyline, called "somewhat incoherent" by The New York Times and "nonsensical" by Harrison's Reports, was a common point of criticism. "Mr. Chaney's makeup is at times hideous enough to make one sick in the stomach. It should please the morbid. Just like the last three or four pictures with this star – gruesome!" Nonetheless, the commercial success of London After Midnight saw Metro-Goldwyn-Mayer renew Tod Browning's directorial contract.

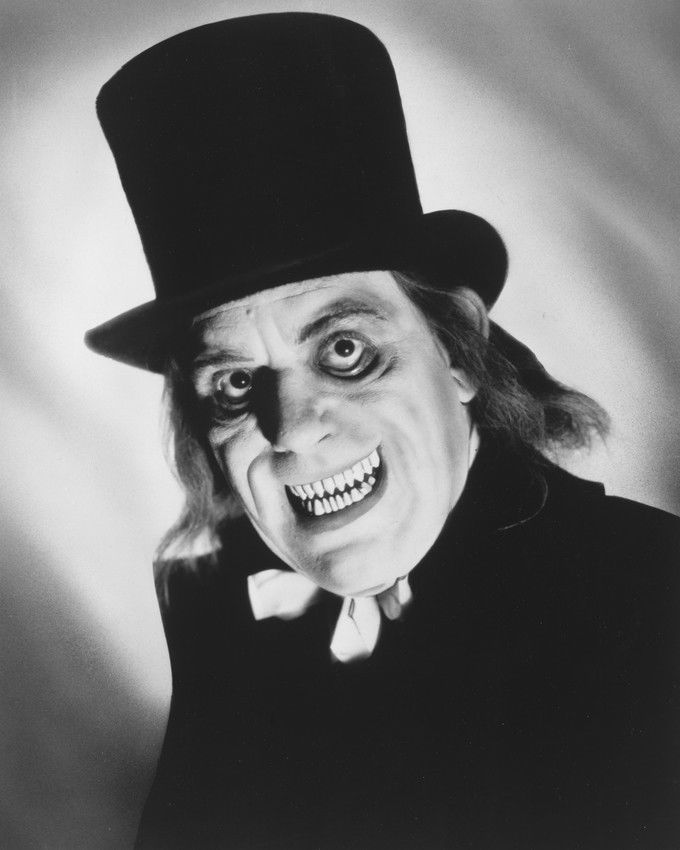
Lon Chaney as the "Man in the Beaver Hat" in London After Midnight

A positive review ran in The Film Daily, calling it "a story certain to disturb the nervous system of the more sensitive picture patrons. Thrills and weird doings in profusion. Probably a trifle too spooky for the timid soul. If they don't get the creeps from flashes of grimy bats swooping around, cobweb-bedecked mystery chambers and the grotesque inhabitants of the haunted house, then they've passed the third degree." Marc Bowman of The Oregonian praised the film as "as nerve-wringing a piece of screen fiction as has been seen in these parts for many moons," noting Chaney's makeup as "bizarre" and "striking."

The Warren Tribune noted that Lon Chaney is "present in nearly every scene, in a dual role that tests his skill to no small degree." The review highlighted that this subdues Chaney's prominence and allows the plot to be better communicated, but it also causes the film to "not rank among his best productions."

A review by The Brooklyn Daily Eagle noted: "It is pleasant to report also that there is none of the usual stupid comedy relief in London After Midnight to mar its sinister and creepy scheme. That ought to make it the outstanding mystery film of the year." It however found fault in Tod Browning's direction because the film's atmosphere did not recapture "the intensely weird effect" found in The Cat and the Canary.

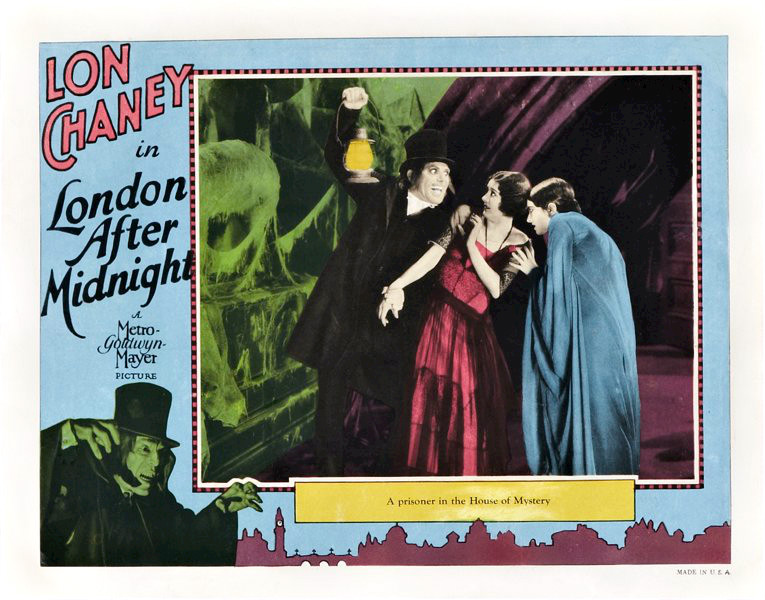
Cinema lobby card

Variety wrote that "Young, Browning and Chaney have made a good combination in the past but the story on which this production is based is not of the quality that results in broken house records," adding that, since Burke was "a detached character, mechanical and wooden", he failed to meaningfully connect with the audience... "It will add nothing to Chaney's prestige as a trouper, nor increase the star's box office value. With Chaney's name in lights, however, this picture, any picture with Chaney, means a strong box office draw."

The New York Times wrote, "It is a somewhat incoherent narrative, which, however, gives Lon Chaney an opportunity to turn up in an uncanny disguise and also to manifest his powers as Scotland Yard's expert hypnotist. You are therefore treated to close-ups of Mr. Chaney's rolling orbs, which, fortunately, do not exert their influence on the audience."

Moving Picture World added, "There are moments during the onward sweep of this Metro-Goldwyn-Mayer offering when one feels that the essentials that make for mystery and creepiness have been carried a bit further than we have hitherto noted... Mr. Chaney's excellent work is materially aided by that grand master of screen acting, Mr. Walthall."

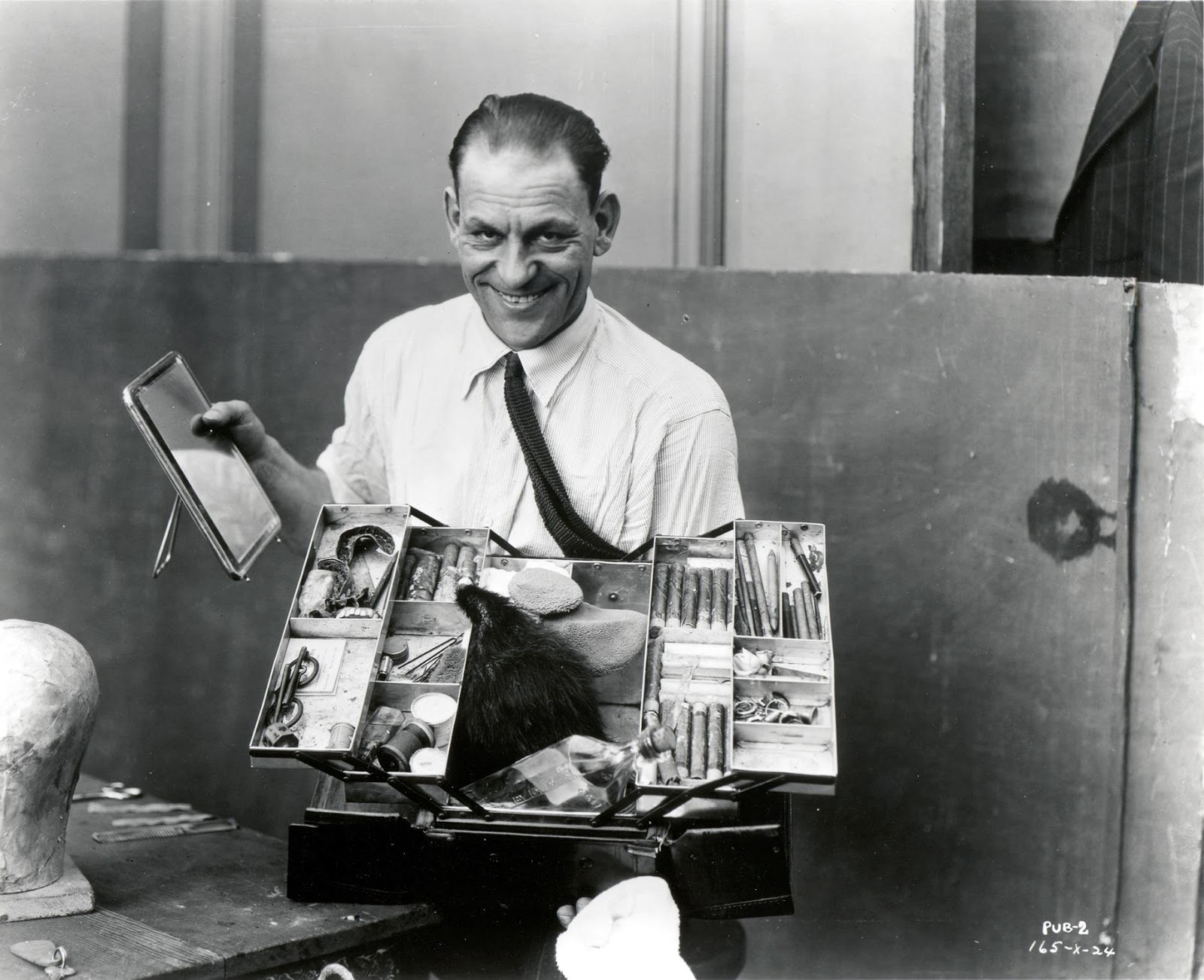
Lon Chaney showing a makeup case used in London After Midnight

The New Yorker also wrote that the "directing, acting and settings are all well up to the idea," but "it strives too hard to create effect. Mr. Browning can create pictorial terrors and Lon Chaney can get himself up in a completely repulsive manner, but both their efforts are wasted when the story makes no sense."

Motion Picture Magazine wrote, "Lon Chaney is back in a get-up which would make any sensitive girl quiver and quake on a dark night, but which doesn't require any contortions or self-torture. This is a dark, foul mystery play, which has certain elements as horrid as anyone could ask... you sit through it in a sort of daze."

Photoplay enthused, "The disguise that [Chaney] uses while ferreting out the murderer is as gruesome as any he has ever worn... The suspense is marvelously sustained. Chaney plays a dual role, and when conventionally clad, is a little less convincing than usual. In the other role, perfect!"

== Preservation ==
=== Loss of materials ===
The last known copy of the film was destroyed in the 1965 MGM vault fire, along with hundreds of other rare early films, making it one of the most sought-after lost silent films. Film historians William K. Everson and David Bradley claim they saw the film in the early 1950s, and an MGM vault inventory from 1955 shows the print being stored in Vault #7. The film's distribution in countries such as France, Spain and Brazil however raises a very faint possibility that the film could still exist in private hands.

Historian Jon C. Mirsalis opined,

Despite all the mythology and excitement over the film, all indications are that it would be a disappointment if uncovered today. Both Everson and Bradley admit that the film was inferior to Browning's 1935 talkie remake THE MARK OF THE VAMPIRE that starred Bela Lugosi and Lionel Barrymore sharing the dual role played by Chaney. The critics of the time were likewise lukewarm, and even Chaney's performance got less than the usual enthusiastic reviews. The eerie Cedric Gibbons-Arnold Gillespie sets, and Chaney's stunning vampire make-up, make for intriguing still photographs, but these scenes account for only a small portion of the film, the rest of the footage being devoted to Polly Moran's comic relief, and talkie passages between detective Chaney and Walthall. Perhaps it is a film that is viewed with more reverence than it deserves simply because it is no longer available for study.

=== Theatrical poster ===
In 2014, the only contemporary poster known to exist for the film was sold to Metallica guitarist Kirk Hammett, who bought it anonymously for $478,000. It was the most valuable poster ever sold at public auction until 2017, when a Dracula (1931) poster sold for $525,800. (A poster for The Mummy (1932) held the previous record, selling for $453,500 in 1997.) The poster was displayed in an exhibition of his collection at the Royal Ontario Museum in Toronto.

== Related works ==
=== Remake ===
Tod Browning remade the film as a sound film in 1935. This film, called Mark of the Vampire, starred Lionel Barrymore and Bela Lugosi in the roles Lon Chaney had performed in London After Midnight.

=== Reconstructions and novelizations ===
A novelization of the film was written and published in 1928 by Marie Coolidge-Rask.

In 1985, Philip J. Riley published the first photo reconstruction of the film's plot compiled of all the surviving production stills at MGM.

In 2002, Turner Classic Movies commissioned restoration producer Rick Schmidlin to produce a 45-minute reconstruction of the film, using the same still photographs with added camera motion. This was released as a part of The Lon Chaney Collection DVD set released by the TCM Archives.

In 2016, Thomas Mann published the book, London After Midnight: A New Reconstruction Based on Contemporary Sources, upon the discovery of a previously-unknown 11,000-word Boy's Cinema magazine published in 1928. A second edition was published in 2018 upon the discovery of an alternative French novelization for the film.

In 2022, a new study by historian Daniel Titley, titled London After Midnight: The Lost Film, was released by Keyreads in conjunction with the film’s 95th anniversary. Nitrate elements from the lost film were presented for the first time, along with new insights, resulting in the most complete overview of the film available. In 2026, he released a follow-up study titled The Hypnotist: The Lost Story of London After Midnight, published by Sticking Place Books.

=== Audio dramatization ===
In September 2023, it was announced that a full-cast audio drama would be recorded, a collaboration between the independent audio production companies AudioMarvels, Pocket Universe Productions and Monkey Basket Entertainment, adapted from the original film script. The cast includes Art Malik as Detective Burke, and Dan Starkey as Sir James Hamlin. The production was released the following month through the show’s website, on Bandcamp, and as part of the fiction podcast Midnight Matinees. The work has received overwhelmingly positive reviews.

== In popular culture ==
- Director Jennifer Kent has stated that images of Lon Chaney's character inspired the look of the titular character in The Babadook.
- Episodes 5 and 6 of series 3 of Whitechapel featured a killer obsessed with London After Midnight who owned a surviving copy.
- The theatrical poster for the 2021 horror film The Black Phone has been compared to Chaney’s image from the Browning film.

== See also ==
- Lost media
  List of lost films
- Vampire film

== Sources ==
- Blake, Michael F. (1997). A Thousand Faces: Lon Chaney's Unique Artistry in Motion Pictures. Lanham, Maryland: Vestal Press. ISBN 978-1-461-73076-7.
- Blake, Michael F. (1998). The Films of Lon Chaney. Lanham, Maryland: Vestal Press. ISBN 978-1-879-51126-2.
- Bloom, Clive (2025). London Uncanny: A Gothic Guide to the Capital in Weird History and Fiction. London, England: Bloomsbury. ISBN 978-1-350-42199-8.
- Cline, John; Weiner, Robert G., eds. (2010). From the Arthouse to the Grindhouse: Highbrow and Lowbrow Transgression in Cinema's First Century. Lanham, Maryland: Scarecrow Press. ISBN 978-0-810-87655-2.
- Melton, J. Gordon; Hornick, Alysa (2015). The Vampire in Folklore, History, Literature, Film and Television: A Comprehensive Bibliography. Jefferson, North Carolina: McFarland. ISBN 978-0-786-49936-6.
- Soister, John; Nicolella, Henry (2012). American Silent Horror, Science Fiction and Fantasy Feature Films, 1913–1929. McFarland & Company. ISBN 978-0-786-48790-5.
- Vogel, Michelle (2010). Olive Borden: The Life and Films of Hollywood's "Joy Girl". Jefferson, North Carolina: McFarland. ISBN 978-0-786-44795-4.
- Workman, Christopher; Howarth, Troy (2016). Tome of Terror: Horror Films of the Silent Era. Baltimore, Maryland: Midnight Marquee Press. ISBN 978-1936168-68-2.

Further reading

- Everson, William K. (1974). Classics of the Horror Film. Citadel Press. ISBN 978-0-80650-437-7
- Jacobs, Louis B. "Plastic Dentistry: New Hollywood Art," Photoplay, October 1928. Features London After Midnight.
- Melton, J. Gordon (2011). The Vampire Book: The Encyclopedia of the Undead. Visible Ink Press. ISBN 978-1-57859-281-4
- Riley, Philip J. (2011). London After Midnight – a Reconstruction. Bear Manor Media. ISBN 978-1-593-93482-8
- Soister, John; Nicolella, Henry (2012). American Silent Horror, Science Fiction and Fantasy Feature Films, 1913–1929. British Library. ISBN 978-0-78643-581-4
