= Shattered Lives =

1925 film

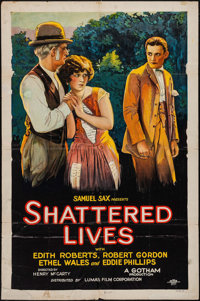
- Theatrical release posters
- Directed by: Henry McCarty
- Written by: Victor Gibson; Henry McCarty
- Produced by: Samuel Sax
- Starring: Edith Roberts; Robert Gordon; Ethel Wales
- Cinematography: Jack MacKenzie
- Production company: Gotham Pictures
- Distributed by: Lumas Film Corporation
- Release date: July 8, 1925
- Running time: 60 minutes
- Country: United States
- Language: Silent (English intertitles)

Shattered Lives is a 1925 American silent drama film directed by Henry McCarty and starring Edith Roberts, Robert Gordon, and Ethel Wales.

== Plot ==
As described in a film magazine review, Mumsie is living on a farm with Donald, not knowing that he is her real son, having adopted him following a train wreck several years before. Her real son had been taken away by her husband when the boy was an infant. Red Myers is put in her home, posing as her son, by a shyster lawyer. The father, who has made a fortune in Alaska, is returning home to Mumsie when the plotters attempt to waylay him. Donald assists in the rescue of his father and it becomes evident that he is the rightful heir, while Red is apprehended. Donald marries Sally.

== Cast ==
- Edith Roberts as Sally Dayton
- Robert Gordon as Donald Trent
- Ethel Wales as Elizabeth "Mumsie" Trent
- Eddie Phillips as Red Myers
- Bernard Randall as Spencer Foulkes
- Willis Marks as John Trent
- Charles W. Mack as Enos Dayton
- Newton House as Chick Connors

== Bibliography ==
- Connelly, Robert B. The Silents: Silent Feature Films, 1910-36, Volume 40, Issue 2. December Press, 1998.
- Munden, Kenneth White. The American Film Institute Catalog of Motion Pictures Produced in the United States, Part 1. University of California Press, 1997.
