= Boy from Indiana =

1950 film

The Boy from Indiana
- Directed by: John Rawlins
- Written by: Otto Englander
- Produced by: Frank Melford
- Starring: Lon McCallister; Billie Burke; George Cleveland
- Cinematography: Jack MacKenzie
- Edited by: Merrill G. White
- Music by: Lucien Moraweck; Marlin Skiles
- Production company: Ventura Pictures Corporation
- Distributed by: Eagle-Lion Classics
- Release date: March 1, 1950
- Running time: 66 minutes
- Country: United States
- Language: English

Boy from Indiana is a 1950 American sports drama film directed by John Rawlins and starring Lon McCallister, Billie Burke and George Cleveland. The film's sets were designed by the art director Lucius O. Croxton.

== Cast ==
- Lon McCallister as Lon Decker
- Lois Butler as Betty Richards
- Billie Burke as Zelda Bagley
- George Cleveland as Robert Bruce Mac Dougall
- Allen Church as Corbett
- Jerry Ambler as Burke
- Rol Laughner as Wilkinson
- Victor Cox as Thorne
- Robert Pollard as Dr. Huffins
- William Peterson as Dr. Maynard
- Herb Jacobs as Harry
- Jeanne Patterson as Pretty Girl

== Bibliography ==
- Davis, Blair. The Battle for the Bs: 1950s Hollywood and the Rebirth of Low-Budget Cinema. Rutgers University Press, 2012,
