= Black Lightning (1924 film) =

1924 film by James P. Hogan

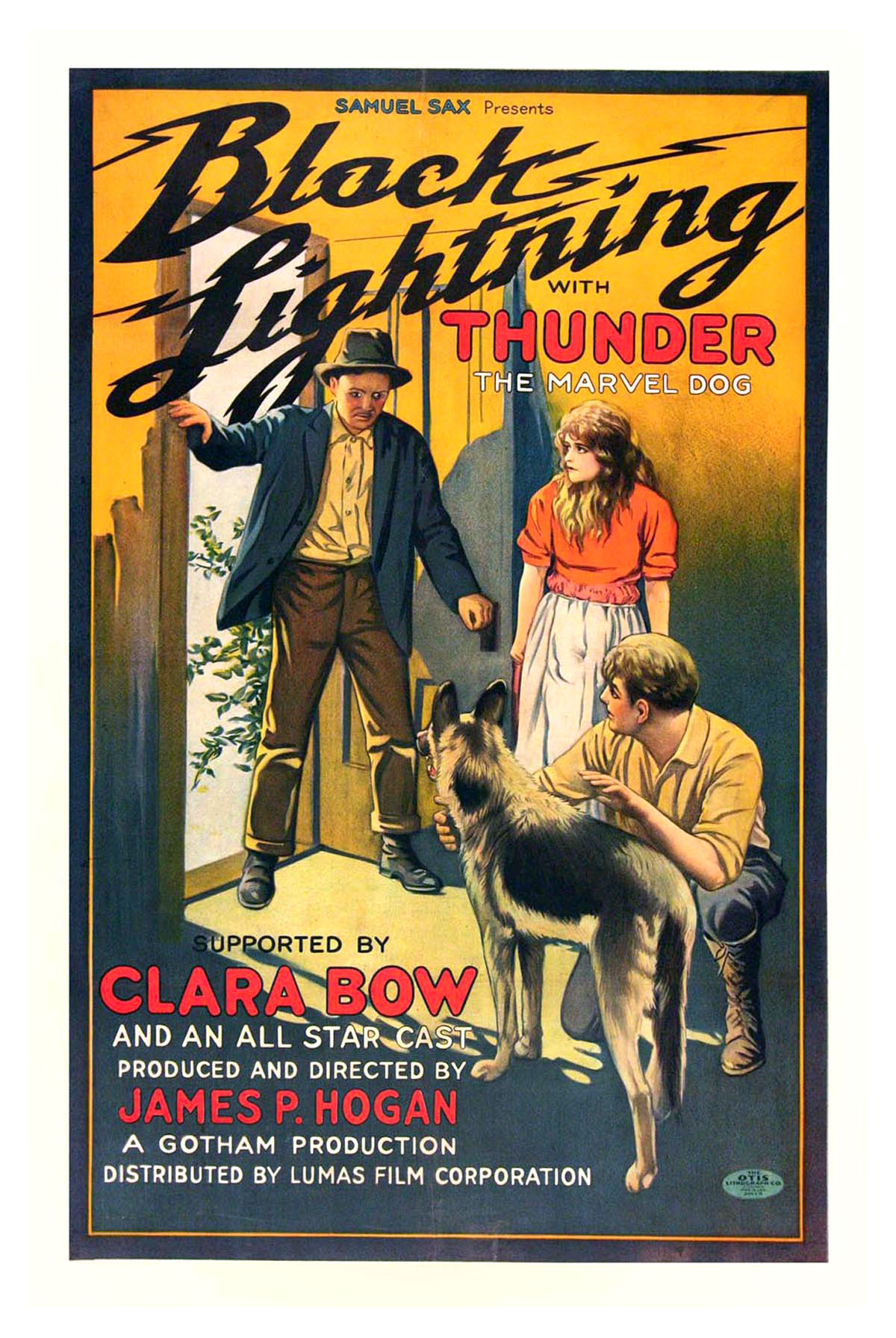
- Thunder the Dog received top billing on the film's theater poster
- Directed by: James P. Hogan
- Written by: Harry Davis (story); Dorothy Howell
- Produced by: Sam Sax; Gotham Productions
- Starring: Thunder the Dog; Clara Bow
- Cinematography: James P. Hogan
- Production company: Gotham Pictures
- Distributed by: Lumas Film Corporation
- Release date: December 8, 1924
- Running time: 60 minutes
- Country: United States
- Language: Silent (English intertitles)

Black Lightning is an extant 1924 American silent drama film directed by James P. Hogan and starring Thunder the Marvel Dog "supported" by Clara Bow and other "All Star Cast". The feature was produced by Gotham Pictures Company.

== Plot ==
As described in a review in a film magazine, with the murder of Frank Larned, his sister Martha and her little brother were left unprotected and the object of unwelcome attentions from Jim Howard and his half-witted brother. Roy Chambers, who was gassed in France during World War I, is ordered by the doctor to go to the mountains. Chance brings him with a police dog he has picked up to the Larned home. He finds that Martha is the sister of his buddy in France, who saved his life, and Thunder being the dog that came to his rescue. Learning the situation, he decides to stay awhile. Joe gets hurt and Roy rides for a doctor. Ez, the half-witted chap, shoots him. Martha sends Thunder to find him, Jim comes and tries to get into the Larned home. Ez kills him and then attacks Martha. Thunder comes to her rescue. Martha and Roy then journey to the preacher together.

== Cast ==
- Thunder the Marvel Dog as Thunder
- Clara Bow as Martha Larned
- Harold Austin as Roy Chambers
- Eddie Phillips as Ez Howard
- Joe Butterworth as Joe Larned / Dick
- Mark Fenton as Doctor
- John Pringle as City Doctor (Pringle was the father of actor John Gilbert)
- James P. Hogan as Frank Larned
- Jim Mason as Jim Howard

== Preservation ==
Prints of Black Lightning are preserved at the Russian state film archive Gosfilmofond and in California at the UCLA Film and Television Archive.
