= Edna Tichenor =

American actress

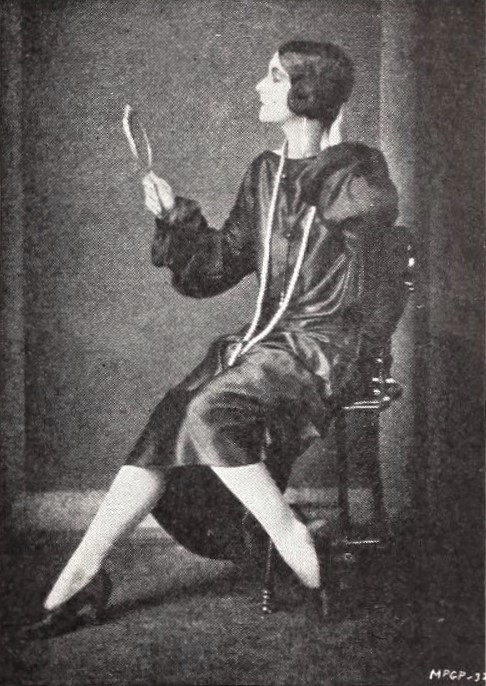
- Tichenor in 1925
- Born: Edna Frances Tichenor; April 1, 1901; Saint Paul, Minnesota, US
- Died: November 19, 1965 (aged 64); Los Angeles, California, US
- Education: Long Beach Polytechnic High School
- Occupation: Actress
- Years active: 1920–1934
- Spouse(s): Robert J. Springer (1919–1930; divorced); Harry West (m. 19??)

Edna Frances Tichenor (April 1, 1901 – November 19, 1965) was an American film actress whose career was most prominent in the silent film era of the 1920s, affecting an onscreen vamp persona. She is perhaps best recalled for three roles in director Tod Browning's films: the 1923 drama Drifting, the lost silent horror film London After Midnight, and the drama The Show, both released in 1927.

== Early life ==
Tichenor was born on April 1, 1901, in Saint Paul, Minnesota, to Ira C. and Hattie Tichenor (née Craig). By 1904, the family relocated to Los Angeles, California, where her father worked as a real estate editor for the Los Angeles Examiner, then later as financial editor of the Salt Lake City Telegram in Utah, before returning to Los Angeles.

Tichenor attended primary and secondary schools in Los Angeles and was a graduate of Long Beach Polytechnic High School. Shortly after her graduation, she married auto mechanic Robert J. Springer in 1919. The couple divorced in 1930.

== Career ==
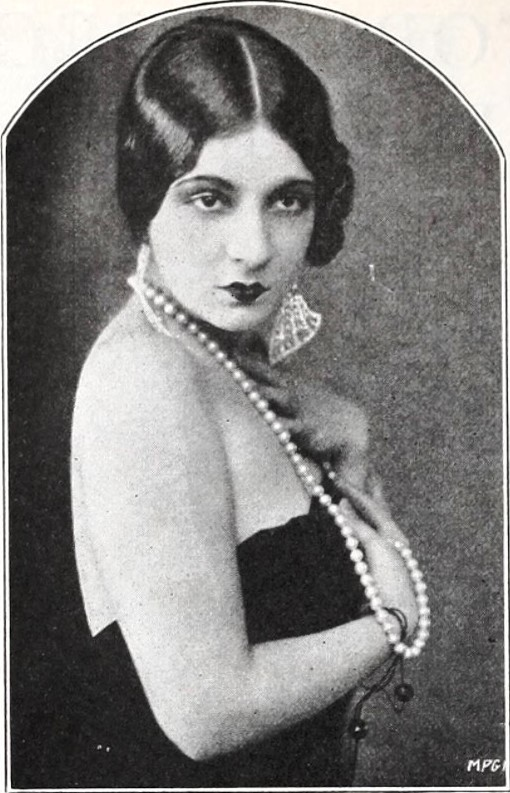
1925

Tichenor's first known credited role was as Molly Norton in the 1923 Tod Browning-directed drama film Drifting, starring Priscilla Dean, Matt Moore and Anna May Wong. It was produced and distributed by Universal Pictures. The same year, she appeared in two more films; the small role of Dolly Baxter in the Harry Beaumont directed comedy The Gold Diggers (1923) for Warner Bros., and an uncredited role as Cleo in the romantic drama Maytime (1923), directed by Louis J. Gasnier and featuring Clara Bow in an early role.

By the mid-1920s, Tichenor began affecting a somewhat sinister vamp onscreen persona; appearing in roles such as The Painted Lady in the Chester M. Franklin crime-drama The Silent Accuser (1924), and two roles in 1926 film shorts simply billed as The Vamp. Tichenor is possibly best recalled for roles in two 1927 films directed by Tod Browning; the small role of Arachnida, a carnival sideshow performer who has the body of a spider and a woman's head, in the crime-drama The Show; and as Luna, The Bat Girl in Browning's lost horror film London After Midnight, released by Metro-Goldwyn-Mayer and starring Lon Chaney. The last known copy of the film was destroyed in the 1965 MGM vault fire.

Before quitting acting, Tichenor made appearances in about twelve different movies. Her last known film appearance was a small role in Tod Browing's 1928 mystery film West of Zanzibar, starring Lon Chaney and Lionel Barrymore.

== Personal life and death ==
Following her divorce from Robert J. Springer in 1930, Tichenor moved back in with her parents in Los Angeles. She later married Harry West. Tichenor died in 1965 at Cedars-Sinai Medical Center from a perforation of her cecum and blood poisoning with an intestinal obstruction following surgery to remove her uterus and ovaries, aged 64. She was cremated and her ashes were given to West.

== Filmography ==
Year	Title	Role	Notes
1923	Drifting	Molly Norton	
1923	The Gold Diggers	Dolly Baxter	Incomplete film
1923	Maytime	Cleo	Uncredited
1924	One Night in Rome	Italian Maid	
1924	The Silent Accuser	The Painted Lady	
1925	The Merry Widow	Dopey Marie	Uncredited
1926	The Gosh-Darn Mortgage	The Vamp	Short
1926	Officer of the Day	The Vamp	Short
1927	The Show	Arachnida - the Human-Spider	Uncredited
1927	London After Midnight	Luna, Bat Girl	Lost Film
1928	West of Zanzibar	Dancing Girl in Zanzibar Club	Uncredited
