= Blazing Arrows =

1922 film

- Directed by: Henry McCarty
- Written by: Lew Meehan; Henry McCarty
- Produced by: Ovid M. Doubleday; Charles W. Mack
- Starring: Lester Cuneo; Francelia Billington; Clark Comstock
- Cinematography: Floyd Jackman
- Edited by: Loti Hardwick
- Production company: Doubleday Production Company
- Distributed by: Western Pictures Exploitation Company
- Release date: October 18, 1922
- Running time: 55 minutes
- Country: United States
- Languages: Silent; English intertitles

Blazing Arrows is a 1922 American silent Western film directed by Henry McCarty and starring Lester Cuneo, Francelia Billington and Clark Comstock.

== Plot ==
John Strong is studying a Columbia University in New York where he falls in love with Martha Randolph, but she spurns him because of his Sioux heritage. Returning west he later saves Martha after her guardian has been murdered, and later discovers that he is himself white having been adopted as a baby.

== Cast ==
- Lester Cuneo as Sky Fire aka John Strong
- Francelia Billington as Martha Randolph
- Clark Comstock as Gray Eagle
- Laura Howard as Mocking Bird
- Lafe McKee as Elias Thornby
- Lew Meehan as Bart McDermott
- Jim O'Neill as Scarface

== Preservation ==
With no holdings located in archives, Blazing Arrows is considered a lost film.

== Bibliography ==
- Connelly, Robert B. The Silents: Silent Feature Films, 1910-36, Volume 40, Issue 2. December Press, 1998.
- Munden, Kenneth White. The American Film Institute Catalog of Motion Pictures Produced in the United States, Part 1. University of California Press, 1997.
