= The Silent Accuser =

1924 film by Chester M. Franklin

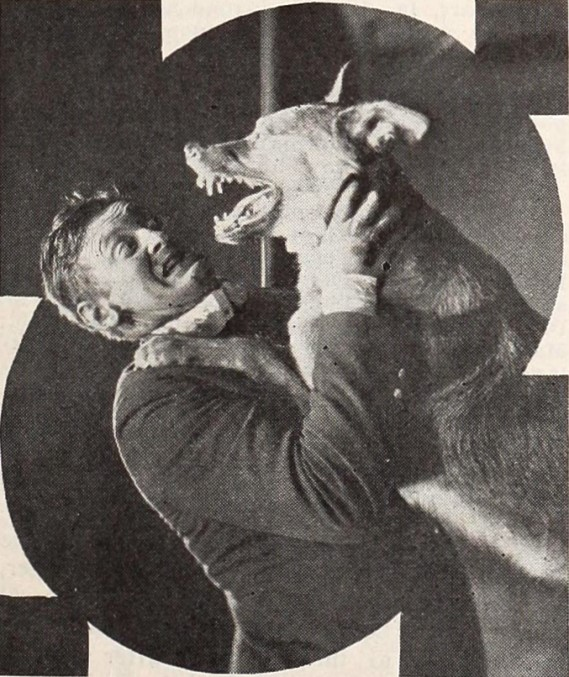
- Still with Peter the Great
- Directed by: Chester M. Franklin
- Written by: Jack Boyle and Chester M. Franklin
- Starring: Eleanor Boardman; Raymond McKee
- Cinematography: Charles Dreyer
- Distributed by: Metro-Goldwyn
- Release date: November 24, 1924
- Running time: 6 reels
- Country: United States
- Language: Silent (English intertitles)

The Silent Accuser is a 1924 American silent crime drama film directed by Chester M. Franklin. The film stars dog star Peter the Great, Eleanor Boardman, and Raymond McKee.

== Plot ==
As described in a review in a film magazine, while waiting for Jack (McKee), with whom she intends to elope, Barbara (Boardman) is accosted in her bedroom by Phil (Metcalfe), a boarder in her home, who is maddened with jealousy. Her screams attract her aged stepfather. She faints and Phil leaves the room in time to be met by the stepfather (Weigel), whom he kills. Peter, Jack's dog, witnesses the murder through the window. Phil escapes and Jack arrives just in time to be in a compromising position. He is convicted of the murder. Peter gains the confidence of the warden and carries messages between Jack and Barbara. When Jack escapes, Peter holds off the guards. Barbara and Jack and Peter cross the border. In a Mexican town they recognize Phil. Barbara lures Phil to their place of hiding, when Peter breaks loose and pursues the villain. After a long chase Peter finally is able to hold Phil at bay until the authorities arrive, when he confesses to the crime.

== Cast ==
- Eleanor Boardman as Barbara Jane
- Raymond McKee as Jack
- Earl Metcalfe as Phil
- Paul Weigel as Stepfather
- Edna Tichenor as The Painted Lady

== Preservation ==
A print of The Silent Accuser is reportedly held in the French archive Centre national du cinéma et de l'image animée in Fort de Bois-d'Arcy.
