= The Plunderer (1924 film) =

1924 film

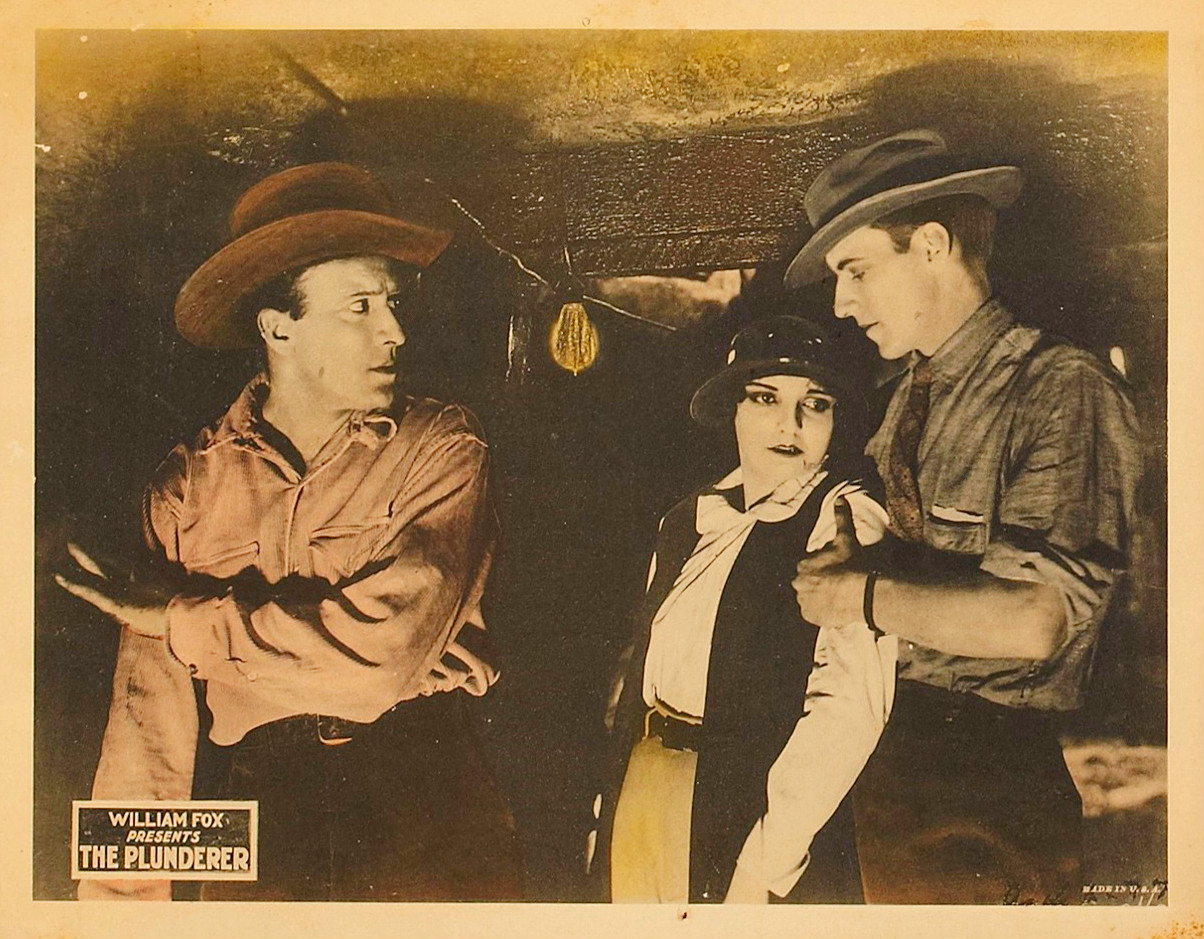
- Lobby card
- Directed by: George Archainbaud
- Written by: Doty Hobart
- Produced by: William Fox
- Starring: Frank Mayo; Evelyn Brent
- Cinematography: Jules Cronjager
- Distributed by: Fox Film Corporation
- Release date: March 30, 1924
- Country: United States
- Languages: Silent; English intertitles

The Plunderer is a lost 1924 American silent Western film directed by George Archainbaud and starring Frank Mayo and Evelyn Brent. An earlier version filmed in 1915 starred William Farnum.

== Plot ==
As described in a film magazine review, Richard Townsend goes West to develop his heritage, the unproductive Croix D'or gold mine. He and Bill Matthews, his trusty foreman, discover that the mine is being plundered of its gold by Bill Presbey, the owner of the adjacent claim and father of Joan. Richard loves Joan, and Matthews is in love with The Lily, the fair proprietor of the mining town honky-tonk. After several exciting episodes that include fights, a strike, the dynamiting of a dam, a fire, and a mine cave-in, love and virtue triumph. Presbey succumbs to his daughter's plea plus Matthews' fists and returns the stolen gold. The Lily reforms and everything points to happiness ever after for her and Bill as well as for Richard and Joan.

== Cast ==
- Frank Mayo as Bill Matthews
- Evelyn Brent as The Lily
- Tom Santschi as Bill Presbey
- Jim Mason as The Wolf (credited as James Mason)
- Peggy Shaw as Joan Presbey
- Eddie Phillips as Richard Townsend (credited as Edward Phillips)
- Dan Mason as Bells Parks

== Preservation ==
In February of 2021, The Plunderer was cited by the National Film Preservation Board on their Lost U.S. Silent Feature Films list and is therefore presumed lost.
