= Zalla Zarana =

American actress (1897–1967)

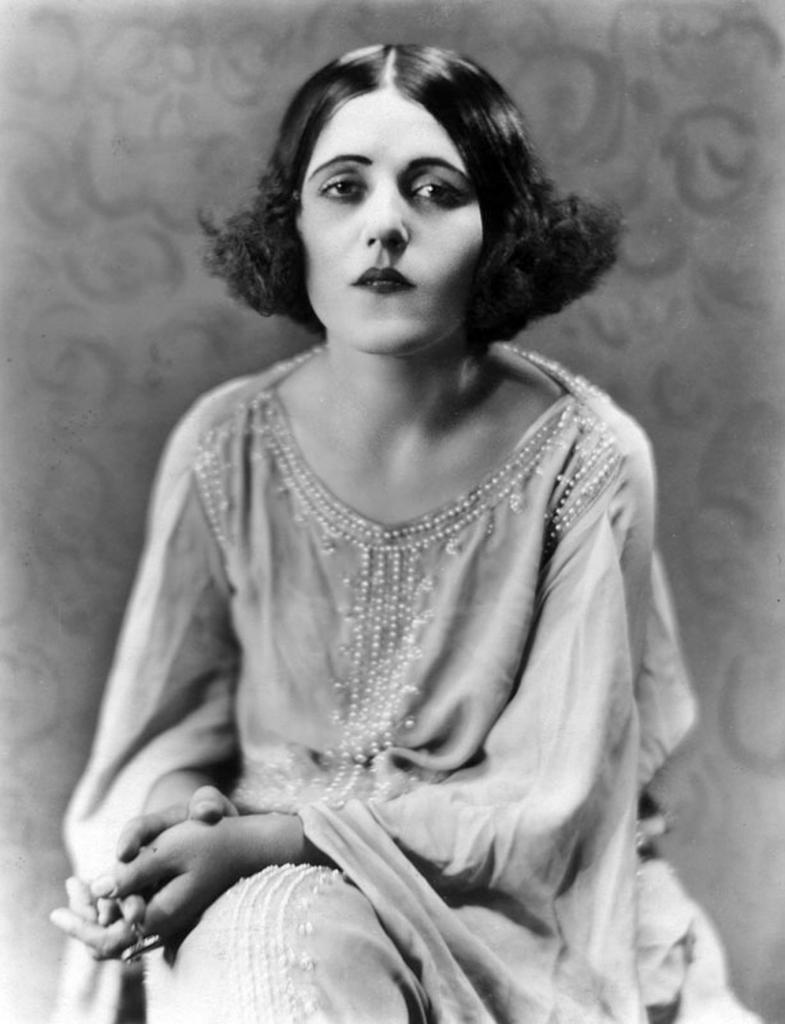
- Zarana in 1920-21
- Born: Rozalija Sršen; July 16, 1897; Žužemberk, Austria-Hungary
- Died: July 12, 1967 (aged 69); Los Angeles, California, United States
- Other names: Zala Zorana, Zalla Zeranno
- Occupation: Actress
- Years active: 1917–1928
- Spouse: Theodore G. Lohman (1930–1944; his death)

Zalla Zarana, born Rozalija Sršen (July 16, 1897 – July 12, 1967), was an American actress in the silent era. She is considered to be the first Slovenian actress to have succeeded in Hollywood.

== Biography ==
Zarana was born on July 16, 1897 (Note: Zarana's 1914 immigration record also states that she was born in 1897. However, her birth year was later "adjusted" to 1901 in her 1930 engagement record, and to 1905 on her grave marker and death certificate.) in Žužemberk, in the region of Lower Carniola in Austria-Hungary. She left for the United States at age seventeen and moved in with her aunt in San Francisco. She went to night classes to learn English, typing and accounting. She accompanied her German-born friend Isabelle Grenner to Los Angeles in 1917 and sought to become an actress. She went from studio to studio and eventually succeeded with a bit part as a Spanish dancer in The Flame of the Yukon. She worked as an extra in westerns with William S. Hart and earned high-profile roles in 1922 as the femme fatale in two low-budget shoot-em-ups, Back Fire, with Jack Hoxie, and Silver Spurs, starring Lester Cuneo. For the latter film, she was promoted in ads as Hollywood's "First Jugo-Slav Beauty." She preferred exotic characters, dancers and vamps and played in at least 20 films. Her career was modest, but she shared scenes with future stars, like Stan Laurel and Gary Cooper, and was cast in small roles in major productions, such as Mae Murray's flashy friend in The Merry Widow, directed by Erich von Stroheim, and a freak show half-lady opposite John Gilbert in The Show, directed by Tod Browning. With the advent of sound films, she retired from the screen and married in 1930. She occasionally performed on stage and wrote plays.

== Partial filmography ==
- The Flame of the Yukon (1917)
- Cupid's Day Off (1919)
- Silver Spurs (1922)
- Back Fire (1922)
- The Wheel of Fortune (1923)
- The Merry Widow (1925)
- The Lady Who Lied (1925)
- The Winding Stair (1925)
- Navy Blue Days (1925) (short)
- The Yokel (1926) (short)
- Butterflies in the Rain (1926)
- Lightnin' Wins (1926) (short)
- The Show (1927)
- The Heart Thief (1927)
- Turkish Howls (1927) (short)
- What Price Love? (1927)
- A Ship Comes In (1928)
- The Big City (1928)
- West of Zanzibar (1928)
- Wings (1928)
- Man, Woman and Wife (1929)
