= Silent Pal =

1925 film

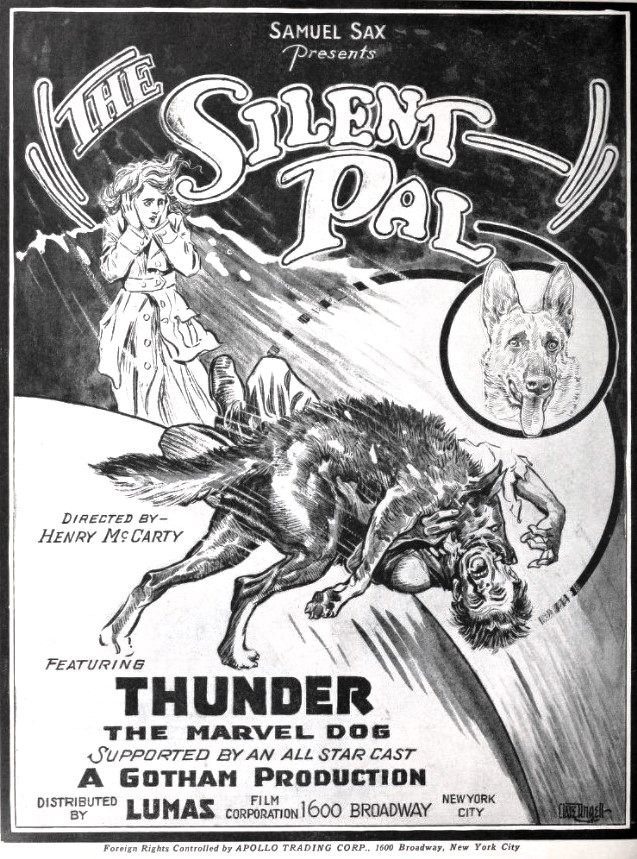
- Directed by: Henry McCarty
- Written by: Henry McCarty
- Produced by: Samuel Sax
- Starring: Thunder the Dog; Eddie Phillips; Shannon Day
- Cinematography: Jack MacKenzie
- Production company: Gotham Pictures
- Distributed by: Lumas Film Corporation
- Release date: March 1925
- Running time: 60 minutes
- Country: United States
- Languages: Silent; English intertitles

Silent Pal is a 1925 American silent Western film directed by Henry McCarty and starring Thunder the Dog, Eddie Phillips and Shannon Day. Produced by the independent Gotham Pictures, it was designed as a vehicle for Thunder, an Alsatian who featured in several films during the 1920s.

== Cast ==
- Thunder the Dog as The Silent Pal
- Eddie Phillips as David Kingston
- Shannon Day as Marjorie Winters
- Colin Kenny as Randall Phillips
- Willis Marks as Daniel Winters
- Charles W. Mack as Lazarus
- Dorothy Seay as Betty Winters

== Bibliography ==
- Connelly, Robert B. The Silents: Silent Feature Films, 1910-36, Volume 40, Issue 2. December Press, 1998.
- Munden, Kenneth White. The American Film Institute Catalog of Motion Pictures Produced in the United States, Part 1. University of California Press, 1997.
