= Jack MacKenzie (cinematographer) =

British cinematographer (1892–1979)

- Born: 13 September 1892; Inverness, Scotland; United Kingdom
- Died: 19 December 1979 (aged 87); Los Angeles, California; United States
- Other name: Ian George MacKenzie
- Occupation: Cinematographer
- Years active: 1916–1963

Jack MacKenzie (13 September 1892 – 19 December 1979) was a British-born cinematographer who worked for most of his career in the United States. During the silent era Jack MacKenzie was employed in Hollywood. In 1930 MacKenzie was sent to London by RKO to work on two films for the company's British partner Associated Talking Pictures. MacKenzie then returned to America. While he occasionally worked on prestige films such as Mary of Scotland (1936) he was employed mainly on numerous low-budget productions and from 1951 in the developing television industry.

== Partial filmography ==
- Anything Once (1917)
- Madame Spy (1918)
- The Fighting Grin (1918)
- The Girl Who Wouldn't Quit (1918)
- A Rich Man's Darling (1918)
- The Honey Bee (1920)
- The Purple Cipher (1920)
- Captain Swift (1920)
- The Romance Promoters (1920)
- Three Sevens (1921)
- Diamonds Adrift (1921)
- The Jolt (1921)
- The Secret of the Hills (1921)
- Bring Him In (1921)
- The Duke of Chimney Butte (1921)
- Colleen of the Pines (1922)
- Thelma (1922)
- Belle of Alaska (1922)
- The Snowshoe Trail (1922)
- Divorce (1923)
- Never Say Die (1924)
- The Lullaby (1924)
- Unmarried Wives (1924)
- Silent Pal (1925)
- The Part Time Wife (1925)
- Shattered Lives (1925)
- The Night Ship (1925)
- The Nutcracker (1926)
- Hold That Lion (1926)
- The Lodge in the Wilderness (1926)
- Soft Cushions (1927)
- A Texas Steer (1927)
- Ladies' Night in a Turkish Bath (1928)
- Dance Hall (1929)
- Whispering Winds (1929)
- Escape (1930)
- Beau Bandit (1930)
- Birds of Prey (1930)
- Should a Doctor Tell? (1930)
- Kept Husbands (1931)
- Laugh and Get Rich (1931)
- White Shoulders (1931)
- Little Orphan Annie (1932)
- Gambling (1934)
- Shock (1934)
- Mary of Scotland (1936)
- Hideaway (1937)
- High Flyers (1937)
- Breaking the Ice (1938)
- Hawaii Calls (1938)
- The Girl from Mexico (1939)
- Mexican Spitfire (1940)
- The Battle of Midway (1942) (short)
- The Magnificent Ambersons (1942) (uncredited)
- The Falcon Strikes Back (1943)
- Gildersleeve on Broadway (1943)
- Passport to Destiny (1944)
- Jungle Woman (1944)
- Zombies on Broadway (1945)
- Isle of the Dead (1945)
- Michael O'Halloran (1948)
- Massacre River (1949)
- The Boy from Indiana (1950)
- The Flame Barrier (1958)
- Paradise Alley (1962)

== Bibliography ==
- Nollen, Scott Allan. Three Bad Men: John Ford, John Wayne, Ward Bond. McFarland, 2013.
