= Part-Time Wife (TV series) =

2026 Indonesian television series

- Original title: Istri Paruh Waktu
- Genre: Drama; Romance
- Based on: Istri Paruh Waktu
- Screenplay by: Tisa T. S.
- Directed by: Sanjeev Ram Kishan
- Starring: Audi Marissa; Arifin Putra; Kiara McKenna; La Rheina Bishop; Humaira Jahra
- Theme music composer: Jerricoev, Tisa T. S.
- Opening theme: "Sisa Janji" by Brisia Jodie
- Ending theme: "Pulang ke Kamu" by Gita
- Composers: Nikanor RS; Rico Hutajulu
- Country of origin: Indonesia
- Original language: Indonesian
- No. of seasons: 1
- No. of episodes: 60

Production
- Executive producer: Shania Punjabi
- Producer: Manoj Punjabi
- Cinematography: Welly Djuanda
- Editors: Hari Imam Wibisono; Rizky Putra; Irfan Hakim; Jefri Sitanggang; Kasino Vega; M. Happy Santoso; Abdul Syukur; Rino; Syaipudin; Supriadi; Ujang Anwar
- Camera setup: Multi-camera
- Running time: ±50 minutes
- Production company: MD Entertainment

Original release
- Network: Netflix
- Release: 27 April – 22 June 2026
- Network: MDTV
- Release: 28 April – 23 June 2026

Part-Time Wife is an Indonesian television series which premiered on 27 April 2026 on Netflix and 28 April 2026 at 7.00 PM on MDTV based on the short film of the same title. The series is directed by Sanjeev Ram Kishan and stars Audi Marissa, Arifin Putra, and Kiara McKenna.

== Plot ==
It tells the story of Riska and Adimas's seven-year marriage. At first glance, it seems harmonious, but secrets and changing attitudes slowly emerge that test the strength of their marriage.

== Cast ==
- Audi Marissa as Riska
- Arifin Putra as Adimas
- Kiara McKenna as Adelina
- La Rheina Bishop as Andini
- Humaira Jahra as Dila
- Lorenzo Gibbs as Rendra
- Dian Nitami as Melly
- Fendy Pradana as Hartawan
- Vonny Anggraini as Mira
- Nadya Mulya as Nancy
- Mike Lucock as Firman
- Reza Nangin as Yudis
- Ence Bagus as Bambang
- Risma Nilawati as Rara
- Maya Wulan as Kiki
- Guntur Nugraha as Axel
- Cut Ara as Intan
- Dilan Janiyar as Ayuning
- Fachrul Hadid as Ferdi
- Richard Gibson as Aldi
- Dwi Surya as Nathan
- Akmal Fadh as Wahyu
- Decynta as Rendra's mother
- Yovi Saddan as Rendra's father
- Andri Sulistiandri as Narto
- Yanah as Tuti
- Hami Diah as Yuli
- Desi Ridya Wati as Arina
- Kiki Brata as Yudis's mother
- Elkie Kwee as self

Not credited

- Adi Irwandi as Guntur
- Kevin Faulky as Bima
