= Law of the Lawless (1923 film) =

1923 film by Victor Fleming

The Law of the Lawless
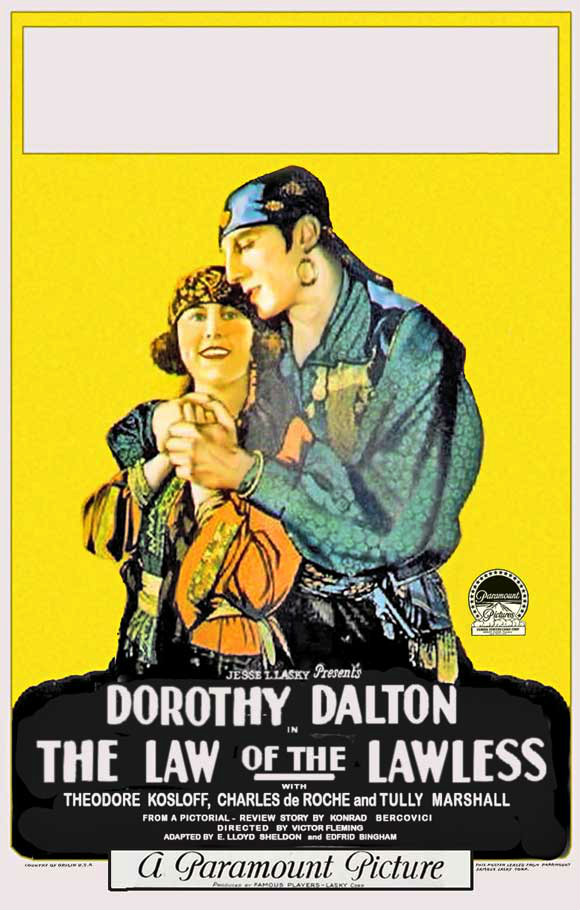
- Theatrical poster
- Directed by: Victor Fleming
- Written by: Konrad Bercovici (story); Edfrid A. Bingham (writer); E. Lloyd Sheldon (writer)
- Produced by: Adolph Zukor; Jesse Lasky
- Starring: Dorothy Dalton
- Cinematography: George R. Meyer
- Distributed by: Paramount Pictures
- Release date: July 22, 1923
- Running time: 70 minutes
- Country: United States
- Language: Silent (English intertitles)

The Law of the Lawless is a lost 1923 American silent drama film directed by Victor Fleming.

== Cast ==
- Dorothy Dalton as Sahande
- Charles de Rochefort as Costa (credited as Charles De Roche)
- Theodore Kosloff as Sender
- Tully Marshall as Ali Mechmet
- Fred Huntley as Osman
- Margaret Loomis as Fanutza
- Frank Coghlan, Jr.
- The German Shepherd "Beneva", later "Thunder the Dog" (uncredited)
