= The Part-time Wife =

1925 film

The Part Time Wife
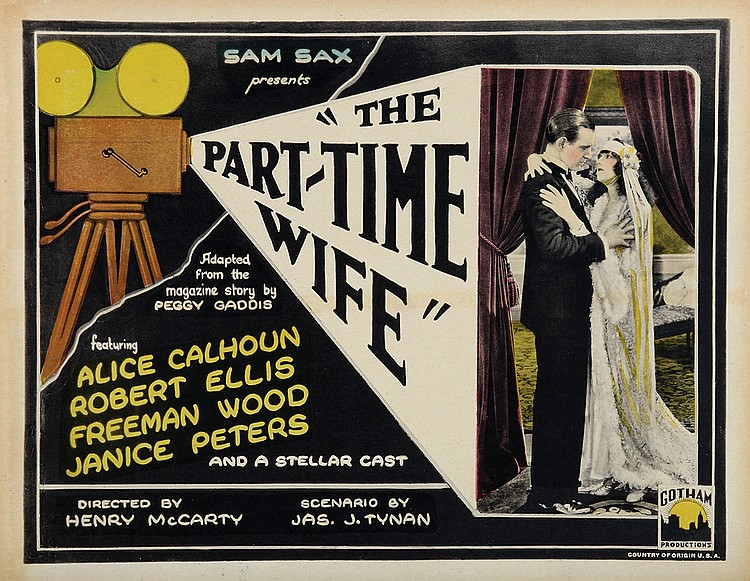
- Directed by: Henry McCarty
- Written by: Henry McCarty; Victoria Moore; James J. Tynan
- Based on: The Part Time Wife by Peggy Gaddis
- Produced by: Samuel Sax
- Starring: Alice Calhoun; Robert Ellis; Freeman Wood
- Cinematography: Jack MacKenzie
- Production company: Gotham Pictures
- Distributed by: Lumas Film Corporation; Stoll Pictures (UK)
- Release date: September 1925
- Running time: 60 minutes
- Country: United States
- Languages: Silent; English intertitles

The Part-time Wife is a 1925 American silent drama film directed by Henry McCarty and starring Alice Calhoun, Robert Ellis and Freeman Wood. The film was produced by the independent company Gotham Pictures. It was based on a short story of the same title by Peggy Gaddis. It was released in Britain the following year by Stoll Pictures.

== Synopsis ==
Film star Doris Fuller marries financially-struggling journalist Kenneth Scott but he is humiliated by being referred to as "Mr. Dorris Fuller". His wife quits her work to be become a full-time wife but their money problems lead her to return to acting. Believing she is having an affair, Scott begins courting a rising young actress Nita Northrup leading to a breach in the marriage. Eventually they reconcile after Scott's new play becomes a hit, and a studio injury to Doris leads her to quit her film career.

== Cast ==
- Alice Calhoun as Doris Fuller
- Robert Ellis as Kenneth Scott
- Freeman Wood as DeWitt Courtney
- Edwards Davis as Ben Ellis
- Janice Peters as Nita Northrup
- Patricia Palmer as 'Toddles' Thornton
- Charles West as Allen Keane

== Bibliography ==
- Connelly, Robert B. The Silents: Silent Feature Films, 1910–36, Volume 40, Issue 2. December Press, 1998.
- Munden, Kenneth White. The American Film Institute Catalog of Motion Pictures Produced in the United States, Part 1. University of California Press, 1997.
