= Edith Wakeling =

Canadian film editor

- Born: Edith Madeleine Gilmour; June 9, 1879; Montreal, Quebec, Canada
- Died: March 21, 1962 (aged 82); Los Angeles, California, U.S.
- Occupation: Film editor
- Spouse: Otty Sylvester Wakeling (1900–1918)
- Children: 3, including Gwen Wakeling and Don Wakeling

Edith Madeleine Wakeling (née Gilmour; June 9, 1879 – March 21, 1962) was a Canadian-born American film editor who worked in Hollywood in the 1920s.

== Biography ==
=== Family and origins ===
Edith was born in Montreal, Quebec, to James Gilmour and Mary Sullivan. She married Otty Wakeling in 1900, and the pair had three children together before Otty died of pneumonia in 1918 in Arizona. Their daughter Gwen would become an Oscar-winning costume designer who also worked in television, creating many of Lucille Ball's gowns on I Love Lucy, and another son, Don S. Wakeling, became a costumer as well.

=== Hollywood career ===
She started her career off as a stenographer in the studio system in Los Angeles, learning about continuity and the filmmaking process on the job. She worked her way into an editing role by 1924. She'd tell reporters that on every film she edited, she was on set to ensure that there weren't any continuity errors. She edited a string of films during the 1920s, including 1927's The Satin Woman and 1928's The Pace That Kills. Her last known credit was on 1929's Linda; she seems to have transitioned into a career as a press agent after this, working with director Walter Lang.

== Selected filmography ==
- Linda (1929)
- The Pace That Kills (1928)
- The Road to Ruin (1928)
- The Cheer Leader (1928)
- Blondes by Choice (1927)
- The Satin Woman (1927)
- Mountains of Manhattan (1927)
- Sinews of Steel (1927)
- Quarantined Rivals (1927)
- The Final Extra (1927)
