= The Satin Woman =

1927 film

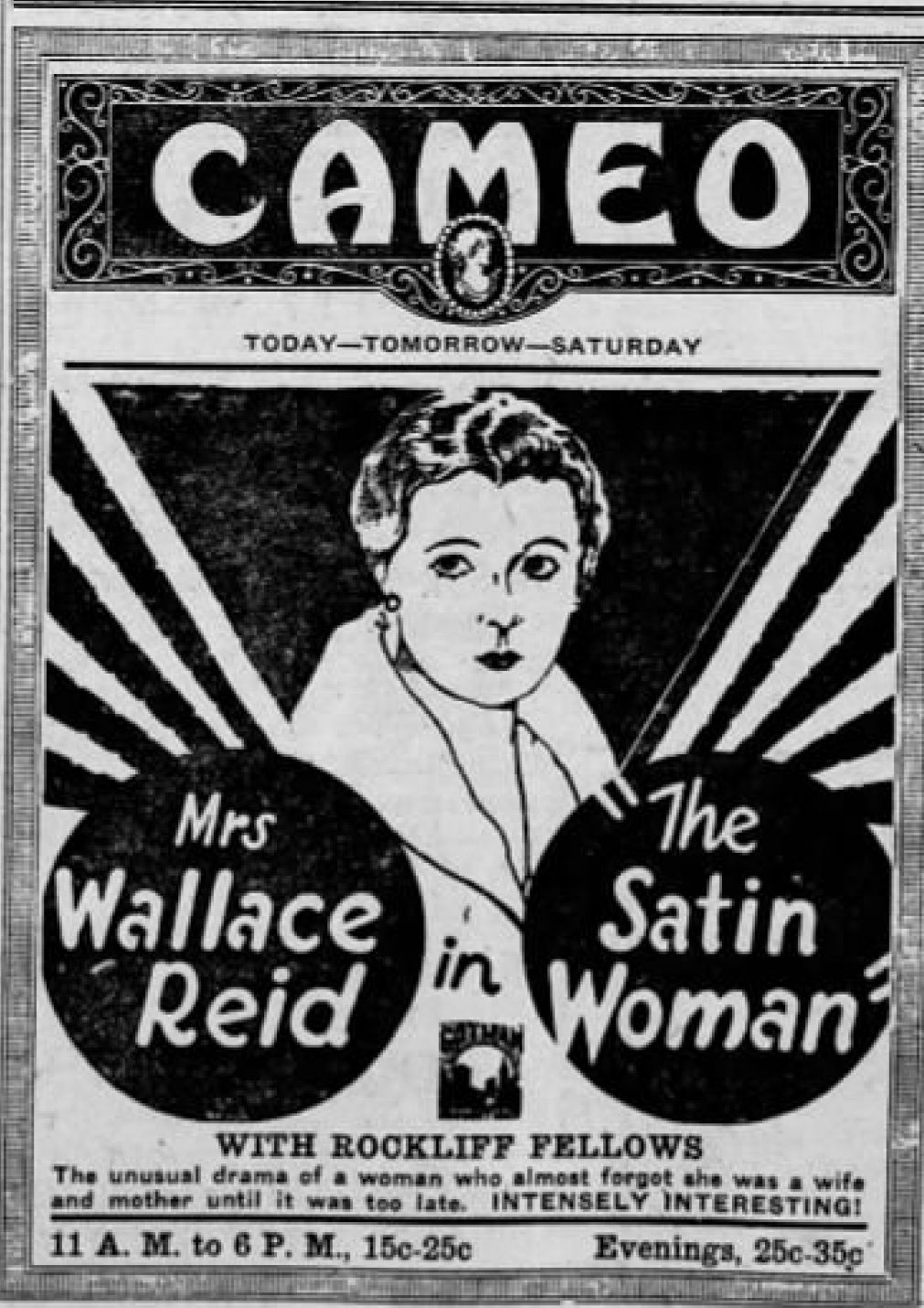
- Newspaper advertisement
- Directed by: Walter Lang
- Written by: Walter Lang
- Produced by: Walter Lang; Dorothy Davenport
- Starring: Dorothy Davenport
- Cinematography: Ray June
- Edited by: Edith Wakeling
- Production company: Gotham Productions
- Distributed by: Lumas Film
- Release date: July 24, 1927
- Running time: 70 minutes
- Country: United States
- Language: Silent (English intertitles)

The Satin Woman is a 1927 American silent drama film directed by Walter Lang and starring Dorothy Davenport, also known as Mrs. Wallace Reid. The film is preserved in the Library of Congress collection.

== Cast ==
- Dorothy Davenport as Mrs. Jean Taylor (credited as Mrs. Wallace Reid)
- Rockliffe Fellowes as George Taylor
- Alice White as Jean Taylor Jr.
- John Miljan as Maurice
- Laska Winter as Maria
- Charles A. Post as Monsieur Francis (credited as Charles 'Buddy' Post)
- Ruth Stonehouse as Claire
- Gladys Brockwell as Mae
- Ethel Wales as 'Countess' Debris
