= The Pace That Kills =

The Pace That Kills may refer to:

- The Pace That Kills (1928 film), silent film
- The Pace That Kills (1935 film)
