= Times Square (1929 film) =

1929 film

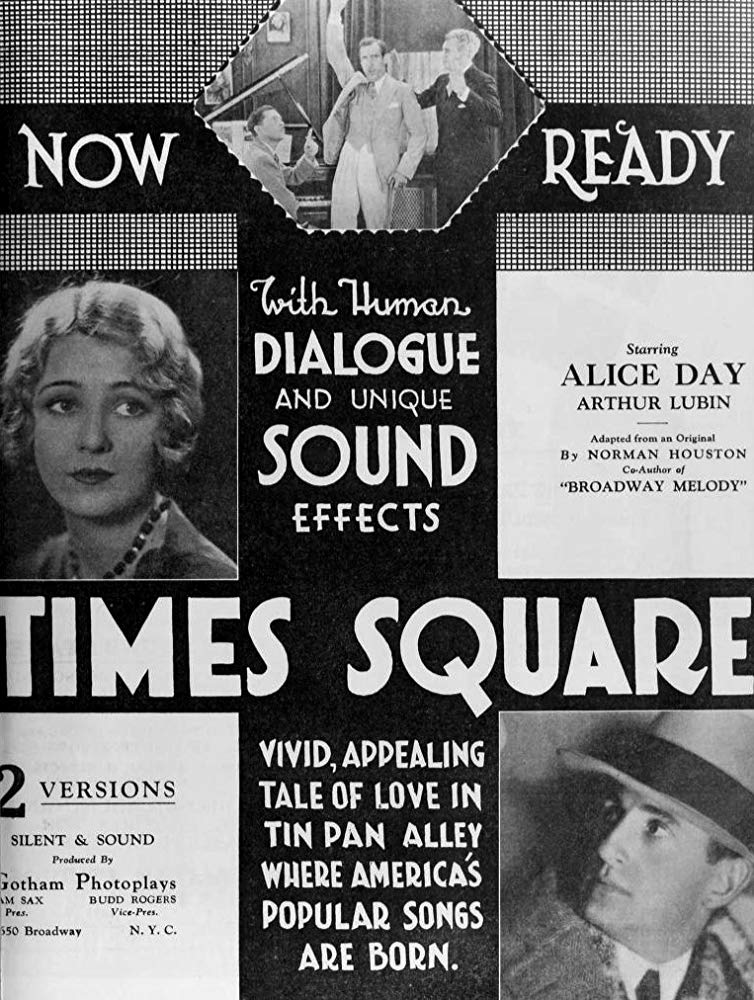
- Directed by: Joseph Boyle
- Written by: Norman Houston; Adele Buffington; Casey Robinson
- Produced by: Samuel Sax
- Starring: Alice Day; Arthur Lubin; Emile Chautard
- Cinematography: Ray June
- Edited by: W. Donn Hayes
- Production company: Gotham Pictures
- Distributed by: Lumas Film Corporation
- Release date: September 1929
- Running time: 78 minutes
- Country: United States
- Languages: Sound (Part-Talkie); English

Times Square is a 1929 American sound part-talkie drama film directed by Joseph Boyle and starring Alice Day, Arthur Lubin and Emile Chautard. In addition to sequences with audible dialogue or talking sequences, the film features a synchronized musical score and sound effects along with English intertitles. The soundtrack was recorded using a sound-on-disc system. The film was shot in Los Angeles and New York.

== Plot ==
In the home of the Lederwitzky family, a family with a heritage rooted in European music, there prevails a profound atmosphere of classical tradition. Just as the renowned concert pianist David Lederwitsky (Emil Chard) was discussing his son’s future with his wife, Sarah (Anne Brody), and the tutor, Professor Carrillo (Joseph Swickard), the raucous sounds of jazz music and boisterous laughter drifting in from the drawing room shattered the quiet, refined atmosphere.

They rush in to find Benny Lederwitski (Arthur Lubin), heir to the family’s legacy, pounding out a rowdy jazz number on the piano while three flappers whirl through the raucous Varsity Drag. Furious, David throws the girls out and pleads with his son to uphold the classical ideals of their ancestors. But Benny, impatient with the past and enchanted by the pulse of modern music, storms out — bound for the bright lights of Times Square.

Benny arrives in New York, eager to conquer Broadway with his jazz-infused compositions. But his brash confidence is quickly deflated. Music publishers shut their doors; nobody wants his tunes. At last, he lands a humble job plugging sheet music at the piano for Nat Ross (Eddie Kane), head of the Times Square Music Publishing Co.

There he meets Elaine Smith (Alice Day), Ross’s kind-hearted secretary. Encouraged by her faith in him, Benny composes a heartfelt number inspired by the hustle and neon dreams of the city — a song he calls "Times Square." But his hopes are dashed when Lon Roberts (Arthur Housman), the firm’s slippery star songwriter, steals the melody and presents it as his own at a swanky New Year’s Eve party hosted by successful composer Dick Barclay (John Miljan).

Benny arrives just in time to hear his work stolen. Outraged, he confronts Roberts — only to be accused of plagiarism himself. In the uproar, Benny loses his job and is disgraced. Only Elaine believes him. Standing by her man, she publicly defends him and announces they will marry at once.

Married life proves difficult. Elaine takes a job with a highbrow classical publisher, while Benny faces rejection after rejection. Humbled and ashamed of being a burden, Benny vanishes, leaving only a note. He retreats to the city’s edge — playing piano in a smoky café in the Ghetto for pennies.

One night, haunted by regret, Benny begins improvising, lost in memory and sorrow. Strange, wistful harmonies flow from him — part jazz, part symphony — a soul laid bare in sound. He jots fragments on menu cards, unaware of the brilliance he’s created.

A kindly old violinist hears the piece and brings the notes to Elaine. She has them transcribed. That same day, David Lederwitski arrives in town for a concert. Drawn inexplicably to the music, he listens — and recognizes something extraordinary. He, Elaine, and a famed impresario hurry to the Ghetto café to find its author.

But Benny is not there — he’s upstairs, preparing to end his life. Below, when the impresario grows impatient and threatens to leave, David steps to the piano and performs the theme himself. In that small, grim café, the great maestro pours out the work of his unknown son with all the mastery of a virtuoso.

The music floats upward, finding Benny in his final moments. Moved and astonished, he stumbles downstairs into the astonished company. Father and son are reunited in joy. Elaine rushes to him. The impresario offers Benny a contract — recognition, fame, a future.

In the closing moments, as the strains of "Times Square" swell once more, the old wounds are healed. A family once divided by music is bound together by it — and the dream of Broadway, once cruel, now opens its arms.

== Cast ==
- Alice Day as Elaine Smith
- Arthur Lubin as Russ Glover / Benjamin Lederwitski
- Emile Chautard as David Lederwitski
- Ann Brody as Sarah Lederwitski
- John Miljan as Dick Barclay
- Arthur Housman as Lon Roberts
- Josef Swickard as Professor Carrillo
- Natalie Joyce as Lida
- Eddie Kane as Nat Ross

== Music ==
The film featured a theme song entitled "My Heart's Longing For You, Elaine," which was composed by Johnny Tucker and Joe Schuster.

== See also ==
- List of early sound feature films (1926–1929)

== Bibliography ==
- Samantha Cook. Writers and production artists. St James Press, 1993.
