= John Miljan =

American actor

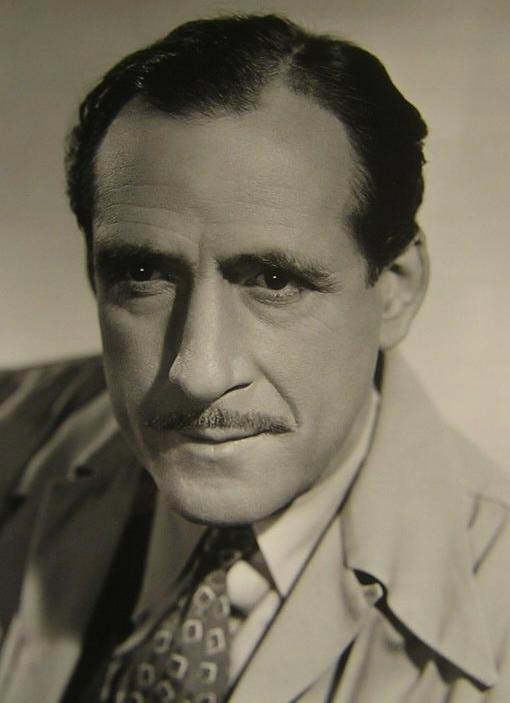
- Miljan 1940
- Born: November 9, 1892; Lead City, South Dakota, U.S.
- Died: January 24, 1960 (aged 67); Hollywood, California, U.S.
- Occupation: Actor
- Years active: 1924–1958
- Spouse: Victoire Lowe (m. 1927)

John Miljan (November 9, 1892 – January 24, 1960) was an American actor. He appeared in more than 200 films between 1924 and 1958.

== Biography ==
Born in 1892, Miljan was the tall, smooth-talking villain in Hollywood films for almost four decades, beginning in 1923. This kind of smooth villainy was made famous by more established actors like Ward Crane and Miljan continued in the mold after Crane's death in 1928. Miljan made his first sound film in 1927 in the promotional trailer for The Jazz Singer, inviting audiences to see the upcoming landmark film. In later years he played imposing, authoritative parts such as high-ranking executives and military officers. He is best remembered as General Custer in Cecil B. DeMille's film The Plainsman. DeMille also cast him in two notable supporting roles in two of his biblical epics: the Danite elder Lesh Lakish in Samson and Delilah (1949), and the blind Israelite grandfather in The Exodus in The Ten Commandments (1956).

Miljan campaigned for the reelection of President Herbert Hoover in 1932.

Miljan died from cancer in Hollywood in 1960, aged 67. He was married to Victoire Lowe (d. 31 March 1965) and adopted her two sons from her first marriage to actor Creighton Hale.

== Selected filmography ==
- Love Letters (1924) as Thomas Chadwick
- The Lone Chance (1924) as Lew Brody
- Romance Ranch (1924) as Clifton Venable
- Empty Hearts (1924) as Frank Gorman
- The Painted Lady (1924) as Carter
- On the Stroke of Three (1924) as Henry Mogridge
- Sackcloth and Scarlet (1925) as Samuel Curtis
- Silent Sanderson (1925) as Jim Downing
- The Phantom of the Opera (1925) as Valentin (uncredited)
- The Overland Limited (1925) as Brice Miller
- Wreckage (1925) as Maurice Dysart
- Sealed Lips (1925) as George Garnett
- The Unnamed Woman (1925) as Archie Wesson
- The Unchastened Woman (1925) as Lawrence Sanbury
- Morals for Men (1925) as Leonard Wallace
- Flaming Waters (1925) as Jasper Thorne
- The Devil's Circus (1926) as Lieberkind
- Brooding Eyes (1926) as Drummond
- Lucky Fool (1926)
- Footloose Widows (1926) as Mr. Smith
- Race Wild (1926)
- Devil's Island (1926) as André Le Févier
- The Amateur Gentleman (1926) as Viscount John Devenham
- The Men Women Love (1926) as Eduardo
- Unknown Treasures (1926) as Ralph Cheneey
- Almost a Lady (1926) as Henri
- My Official Wife (1926) as Nicholas
- Wolf's Clothing (1927) as Johnson Craigie
- The Final Extra (1927) as Mervin Le Roy
- Quarantined Rivals (1927) as Ed, the barber
- The Yankee Clipper (1927) as Paul de Vigny
- The Ladybird (1927) as Jules Ranier
- Paying the Price (1927) as Michael Donovan
- Lovers (1927) as Alvarez
- Rough House Rosie (1927) as Lew McKay
- Framed (1927) as Lola's Husband
- Old San Francisco (1927) as Don Luis (uncredited)
- What Happened to Father? (1927) as Victor Smith
- The Satin Woman (1927) as Maurice
- Stranded (1927) as Grant Payne
- The Desired Woman (1927) as Lieutenant Kellogg
- The Clown (1927) as Bert Colton
- A Sailor's Sweetheart (1927) as Mark
- The Jazz Singer (1927) as Host (uncredited)
- Sailor Izzy Murphy (1927) as The lunatic
- The Silver Slave (1927) as Philip Caldwell
- The Slaver (1927) as Cyril Blake
- Husbands for Rent (1927) as Hugh Frazer
- The Little Snob (1928) as Walt Keene
- Tenderloin (1928) as Bank Teller
- The Crimson City (1928) as Gregory Kent
- Glorious Betsy (1928) as Preston
- Lady Be Good (1928) as Murray
- Women They Talk About (1928) as Officer
- The Terror (1928) as Alfred Katman
- Land of the Silver Fox (1928) as James Crawford
- The Home Towners (1928) as Joe Roberts
- Stark Mad (1929) as Dr. Milo
- The Eternal Woman (1929) as Gil Martin
- Queen of the Night Clubs (1929) as Grant - Lawyer
- Hardboiled Rose (1929) as Steve Wallace
- The Desert Song (1929) as Capt. Fontaine
- Voice of the City (1929) as Dapper Don Wilkes
- Innocents of Paris (1929) as Monsieur Renard
- Fashions in Love (1929) as Frank Martin
- Speedway (1929) as Lee Renny
- The Unholy Night (1929) as Major Mallory
- Times Square (1929) as Dick Barclay
- Untamed (1929) as Bennock
- Devil May Care (1929) as Lucien DeGrignon
- The Woman Racket (1930) as Chris
- Not So Dumb (1930) (uncredited)
- Free and Easy (1930) as himself - Actor in Bedroom Scene
- Show Girl in Hollywood (1930) as Frank Buelow - The Director
- In Gay Madrid (1930) as Armada - the Torero (uncredited)
- The Unholy Three (1930) as Prosecuting Attorney
- The Sea Bat (1930) as Juan
- Our Blushing Brides (1930) as Martin W. Sanderson
- War Nurse (1930) as French Medical Officer (uncredited)
- Remote Control (1930) as Doctor Leonard T. Kruger
- Paid (1930) as Inspector Burke
- Great Day (1930)
- The Great Meadow (1931) as Daniel Boone (uncredited)
- Inspiration (1931) as Henry Coutant, the Sculptor
- Gentleman's Fate (1931) as Florio
- The Secret Six (1931) as Joe Colimo
- Iron Man (1931) as Paul H. Lewis
- Politics (1931) as Jim Curango
- Son of India (1931) as Juggat
- Susan Lenox, Her Fall and Rise (1931) as Wayne Burlingham
- Hell Divers (1931) as Lt. Commander Jack Griffin
- Possessed (1931) as John Driscoll
- West of Broadway (1931) as Norm
- Emma (1932) as District Attorney
- The Beast of the City (1932) as District Attorney
- Arsène Lupin (1932) as Prefect of Police
- The Wet Parade (1932) as Major Doleshal
- Are You Listening? (1932) as Ted Russell
- Night Court (1932) as Crawford
- The Rich Are Always with Us (1932) as Greg Grannard
- Unashamed (1932) as District Attorney Harris
- Prosperity (1932) as Holland
- The Kid from Spain (1932) as Pancho
- Flesh (1932) as Joe Willard
- Made on Broadway (1933)
- Whistling in the Dark (1933) as Charlie
- What! No Beer? (1933) as Butch Lorado
- The Nuisance (1933) as John Calhoun
- Blind Adventure (1933) as Regan
- The Way to Love (1933) as Marco
- The Mad Game (1933) as William Bennett
- Twin Husbands (1933) as Jerry Van Trevor / Jerry Werrenden
- King for a Night (1933) as Walter Douglas
- The Sin of Nora Moran (1933) as Paulino
- Madame Spy (1934) as Weber
- The Poor Rich (1934) as Prince Abdul Hamidshan
- Whirlpool (1934) as Barney Gaige
- The Line-Up (1934) as Reginald Fields
- Unknown Blonde (1934) as Frank Wilson
- Young and Beautiful (1934) as Gordon Douglas
- Belle of the Nineties (1934) as Ace Lamont
- Tomorrow's Youth (1934) as Thomas Hall Sr.
- The Ghost Walks (1934) as Prescott Ames
- Charlie Chan in Paris (1935) as Albert Dufresne
- Mississippi (1935) as Major Patterson
- Under the Pampas Moon (1935) as Graham Scott
- Three Kids and a Queen (1935) as Boss Benton
- Murder at Glen Athol (1936) as Bill Holt
- Sutter's Gold (1936) as Gen. Juan Bautista Alvarado
- Private Number (1936) as Stapp
- The Gentleman from Louisiana (1936) as Baltimore
- North of Nome (1936) as Dawson
- The Plainsman (1936) as Gen. George A. Custer
- Arizona Mahoney (1936) as Cameron Lloyd
- Of Human Hearts (1938)
- Man-Proof (1938) as Tommy Gaunt
- Border G-Man (1938) as Louis Rankin
- If I Were King (1938) as Thibaut D'Aussigny
- Ride a Crooked Mile (1938) as Lt. Col. Stuart
- Pardon Our Nerve (1939) as Duke Page
- The Oklahoma Kid (1939) as Ringo (the lawyer)
- Juarez (1939) as Mariano Escobedo
- Torchy Runs for Mayor (1939) as Dr. Dolan
- Fast and Furious (1939) as Eric Bartell
- Emergency Squad (1940) as Slade Wiley
- Women Without Names (1940) as John Marlin, Asst Dist. Attey.
- Queen of the Mob (1940) as Pan
- New Moon (1940) as Pierre Brugnon
- Young Bill Hickok (1940) as Nicholas Tower
- Texas Rangers Ride Again (1940) as Carter Dangerfield
- The Cowboy and the Blonde (1941) as Bob Roycroft
- Double Cross (1941) as Nick Taggart
- Forced Landing (1941) as General Valdane
- The Deadly Game (1941) as Henri Franck
- Riot Squad (1941) as Jim Grosso
- Obliging Young Lady (1942) as George Potter
- True to the Army (1942) as Drake
- North of the Rockies (1942) as Lionel Morgan
- The Big Street (1942) as McWhirter (uncredited)
- Criminal Investigator (1942) as Edward Judson
- Scattergood Survives a Murder (1942) as Rolfe
- The Boss of Big Town (1942) as Kenneth Craige
- Submarine Alert (1943) as Mr. Bambridge / Capt. Haigas
- Bombardier (1943) as Chaplain Charlie Craig
- The Fallen Sparrow (1943) as Inspector 'Toby' Tobin
- The Iron Major (1943) as Oregon State Coach (uncredited)
- Bride by Mistake (1944) as Major Harvey
- The Merry Monahans (1944) as Arnold Pembroke, Has-Been Matinee Idol
- I Accuse My Parents (1944) as Dan Wilson
- It's in the Bag! (1945) as Mr. Arnold
- Back to Bataan (1945) as Gen. Jonathan Wainwright ('Skinny') (uncredited)
- Wildfire (1945) as Pete Fanning
- Lost City of the Jungle (1946, Serial) as Dr. Gaffron
- The Last Crooked Mile (1946) as Police Lt. Mayrin
- The Killers (1946) as Jake the Rake (uncredited)
- White Tie and Tails (1946) as Mr. Latimer
- Sinbad the Sailor (1947) as Moga
- Queen of the Amazons (1947) as narrator / Col. Jones
- That's My Man (1947) as Secretary
- Unconquered (1947) as Prosecutor at Court-Martial (uncredited)
- The Flame (1947) as Detective
- Perilous Waters (1948) as Carter Larkin
- Adventure in Baltimore (1949) as Mr. Eckert
- Stampede (1949) as T.J. Furman
- Samson and Delilah (1949) as Lesh Lakish
- Mrs. Mike (1949) as Mr. Howard
- Mule Train (1950) as Judd Holbrook (uncredited)
- Walk Softly, Stranger (1950) as Old Man (uncredited)
- M (1951) as Blind Balloon Vendor
- Anything Can Happen (1952) as Indian (scenes deleted)
- Bonzo Goes to College (1952) as Wilbur Crane
- The Savage (1952) as Chief White Thunder (uncredited)
- Fort Algiers (1953) as Arab Chieftain (uncredited)
- Pirates of Tripoli (1955) as Malek
- Run for Cover (1955) as Mayor Walsh
- The Wild Dakotas (1956) as Antelope
- The Ten Commandments (1956) as The Blind One
- The Lone Ranger and the Lost City of Gold (1958) as Chief Tomache (final film role)
- Dead Men Don't Wear Plaid (1982) (in "The Killers") (archive footage)
