= The Woman Who Did Not Care =

1927 film

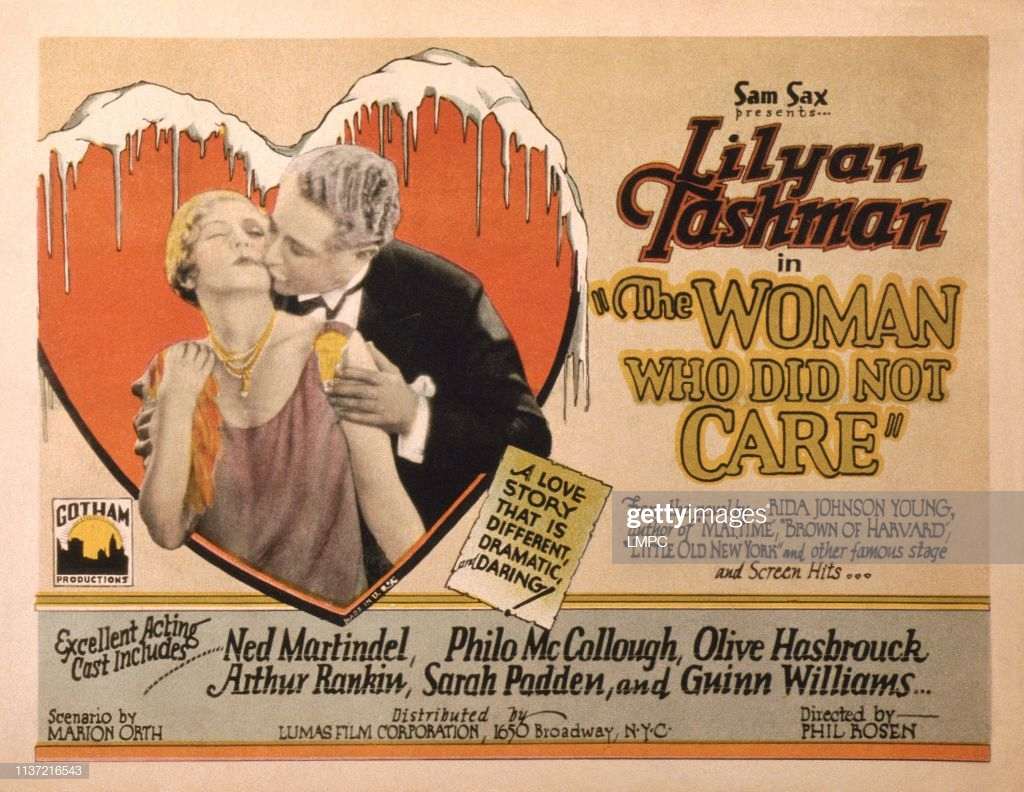
- Directed by: Phil Rosen
- Written by: Marion Orth; Rida Johnson Young
- Produced by: Samuel Sax
- Starring: Lilyan Tashman; Edward Martindel; Philo McCullough
- Cinematography: Ray June
- Production company: Gotham Productions
- Distributed by: Lumas Film Corporation
- Release date: July 5, 1927
- Running time: 60 minutes
- Country: United States
- Languages: Silent; English intertitles

The Woman Who Did Not Care is a 1927 American silent drama film directed by Phil Rosen and starring Lilyan Tashman, Edward Martindel and Philo McCullough.

== Cast ==
- Lilyan Tashman as Iris Carroll
- Edward Martindel as Franklin Payne
- Arthur Rankin as Jeffrey Payne
- Philo McCullough as Gregory Payne
- Olive Hasbrouck as Diana Payne
- Sarah Padden as Mrs. Carroll
- Guinn 'Big Boy' Williams as Lars

== Production ==
Filming was delayed by Ruth Boyd's operation for appendicitis, and several days of retakes were needed. Olive Hasbrouck assumed the role.

== Preservation ==
A 35 mm print of The Woman Who Did Not Care is held by George Eastman House.

== Bibliography ==
- Munden, Kenneth White. The American Film Institute Catalog of Motion Pictures Produced in the United States, Part 1. University of California Press, 1997.
