= Hands Up! (1926 film) =

1926 film directed by Clarence Badger

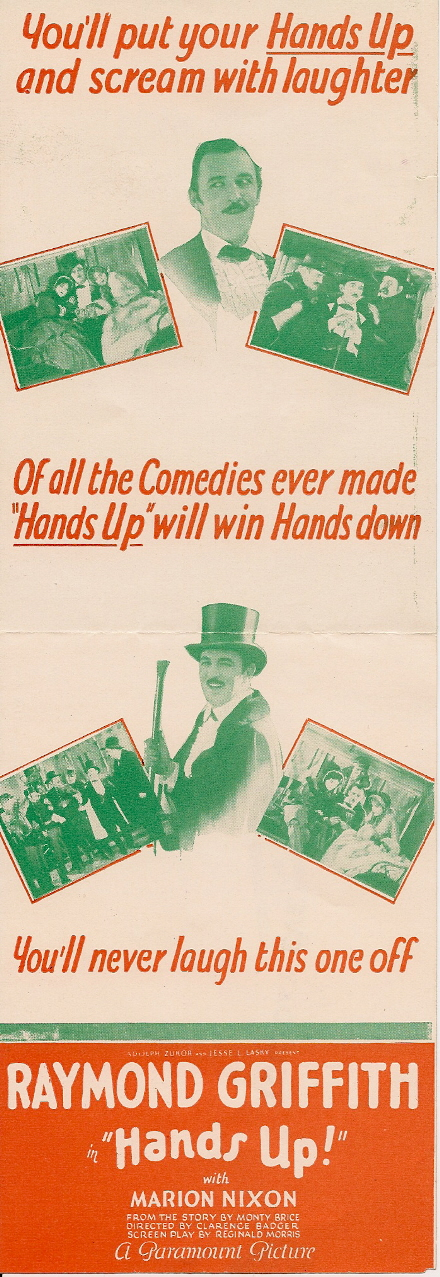
- Contemporary pamphlet for the film
- Directed by: Clarence G. Badger
- Written by: Monte Brice; Lloyd Corrigan
- Story by: Reggie Morris
- Produced by: Jesse L. Lasky; Adolph Zukor
- Starring: Raymond Griffith; Virginia Lee Corbin; Charles K. French; Marian Nixon
- Cinematography: H. Kinley Martin
- Distributed by: Paramount Pictures
- Release date: January 14, 1926
- Running time: 70 minutes
- Country: United States
- Language: Silent (English intertitles)

Hands Up! is a 1926 American silent comedy film directed by Clarence Badger, co-written by Monte Brice and Lloyd Corrigan, and starring Raymond Griffith, one of the great silent movie comedians. The film features fictional incidents involving actual historical figures such as Abraham Lincoln, Brigham Young, and Sitting Bull.

== Plot ==
Hands Up! (full film)

As described in a film magazine review, during the Civil War, Jack, an officer and spy for Confederate States Army, attempts to secure a Union gold mine that had been discovered by Allan Pinkerton for Abraham Lincoln, and keep a load of gold from reaching the Union Army. He tries to blow up the mine but exposes a richer vein of gold. He is caught and about to be hanged when he is saved by two daughters of the mine owner. Jack grabs two guns and successfully holds up the gang when word arrives that the war has been declared over. Jack then follows Brigham Young's example and starts for Salt Lake City so that he can marry both daughters. Along the way, while engaging in sex with the young women, the stage coach is shot full of arrows, which he describes as "bee stings."

== Cast ==
- George A. Billings as Abraham Lincoln
- Virginia Lee Corbin as Alice Woodstock
- Charles K. French as Brigham Young
- Raymond Griffith as Jack, a Confederate Spy
- Noble Johnson as Sitting Bull
- Montagu Love as Capt. Edward Logan
- Marian Nixon as Mae, the Girl He Loves
- Mack Swain as Silas Woodstock
- Jim Blackwell as Servant who knows Jack (uncredited)

== Preservation ==
In 2005, this film was selected for preservation in the United States National Film Registry by the Library of Congress as being "culturally, historically, or aesthetically significant".

== See also ==
- List of films and television shows about the American Civil War
