= Casey Robinson =

American film director (1903–1979)

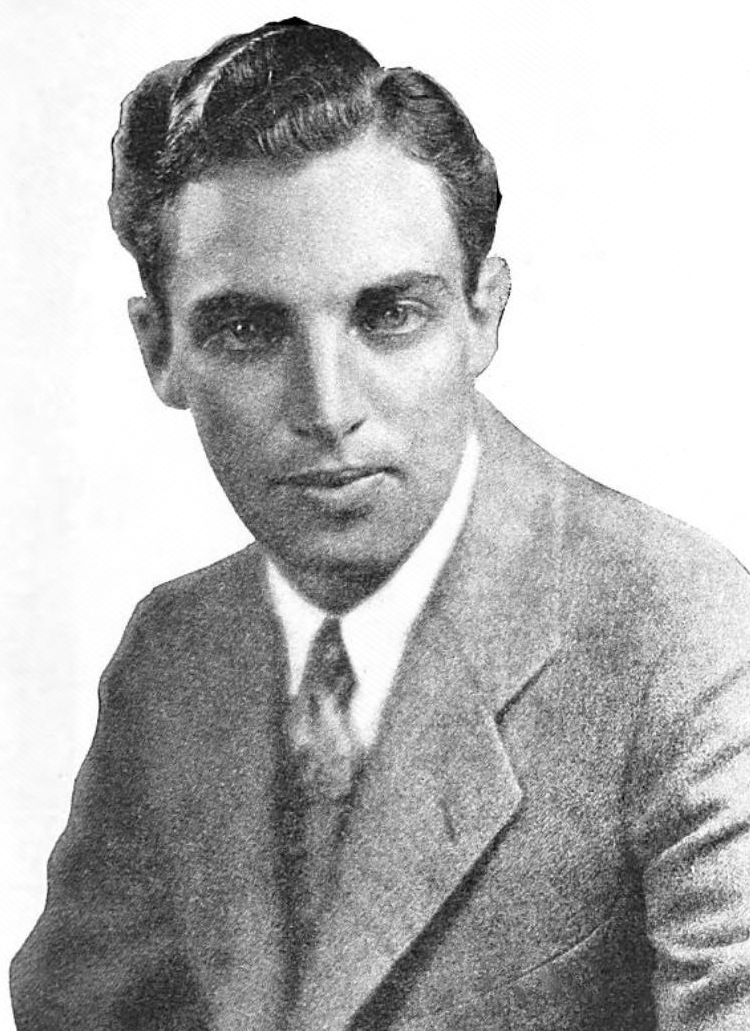
- Born: Kenneth Casey Robinson; October 17, 1903; Logan, Utah, U.S.
- Died: December 6, 1979 (aged 76); Sydney, New South Wales, Australia
- Occupations: Screenwriter, film director, producer

Kenneth Casey Robinson (October 17, 1903 – December 6, 1979) was an American producer and director of mostly B movies and a screenwriter responsible for some of Bette Davis' most revered films. Film critic Richard Corliss once described him as "the master of the art – or craft – of adaptation."

== Life and career ==
Robinson was born in Logan, Utah, the son of a Brigham Young College music/drama instructor. He graduated from Cornell University at the age of 19 and briefly taught English before turning to journalism.

In 1927, he began his Hollywood career writing the titles for silent movies. Robinson later said:

Writing subtitles was as good a way for a new writer to begin as any. It took you right into the editorial rooms—handling the film yourself; spotting the places for the titles that carried the thread of the story and dialogue, the sense of the scenes, and what the people were presumably saying on the screen.

Robinson found himself out of work when sound films came in but managed to sell a story The Last Parade which led to a four-week contract at Columbia. While there he worked for Harry Joe Brown and followed Brown to Warner Bros.

He graduated to directing in the early 1930s, but after six films he abandoned that field in order to concentrate on writing. The films with Davis included It's Love I'm After, Dark Victory, The Old Maid, All This, and Heaven Too, Now, Voyager, and The Corn Is Green.

Robinson's production credits include Days of Glory, Under My Skin, and Two Flags West, all of which he scripted as well. He also worked on three weeks of re-writes for Casablanca, but was uncredited. In 1935, Robinson was a write-in candidate for what was then called the Academy Award for Best Writing, Screenplay for his work on Captain Blood.

After spending the better part of the 1930s and the early 1940s working at Warner Bros., Robinson moved to MGM in the mid-'40s, then to 20th Century Fox in the 1950s. He retired in 1962 and eventually emigrated to Sydney, Australia (his third wife was Australian). While in Sydney he came out of retirement to write and produce Scobie Malone, in 1975.

He was married three times. His second wife was prima ballerina Tamara Toumanova; they were wed from 1944 until their divorce in 1955. He died in Sydney, Australia in 1979, aged 76.

== Selected filmography ==
- Bare Knees (1928)
- Out of the Ruins (1928)
- The Head of the Family (1928)
- Companionate Marriage (1928)
- United States Smith (1928)
- Times Square (1929)
- The Squealer (1930)
- The Last Parade (1931)
- Renegades of the West (1932)
- I Found Stella Parish (1935)
- Captain Blood (1935)
- It's Love I'm After (1937)
- Tovarich (1937)
- Four's a Crowd (1938)
- Dark Victory (1939)
- The Old Maid (1939)
- All This, and Heaven Too (1940)
- One Foot in Heaven (1941)
- Kings Row (1942)
- Now, Voyager (1942)
- This Is the Army (1943)
- Passage to Marseille (1944)
- The Racket Man (1944)
- Days of Glory (1944) (also producer)
- The Corn Is Green (1945)
- Father Was a Fullback (1949)
- The Snows of Kilimanjaro (1952)
- The Egyptian (1954)
- While the City Sleeps (1956)
- Scobie Malone (1975) (also producer)

== Notes ==
- Greenberg, Joel (1986). "Casey Robinson: master adaptor". Backstory : interviews with screenwriters of Hollywood's golden age. University of California. pp. 290–310.
