= Gwen Wakeling =

American costume designer (1901–1982)

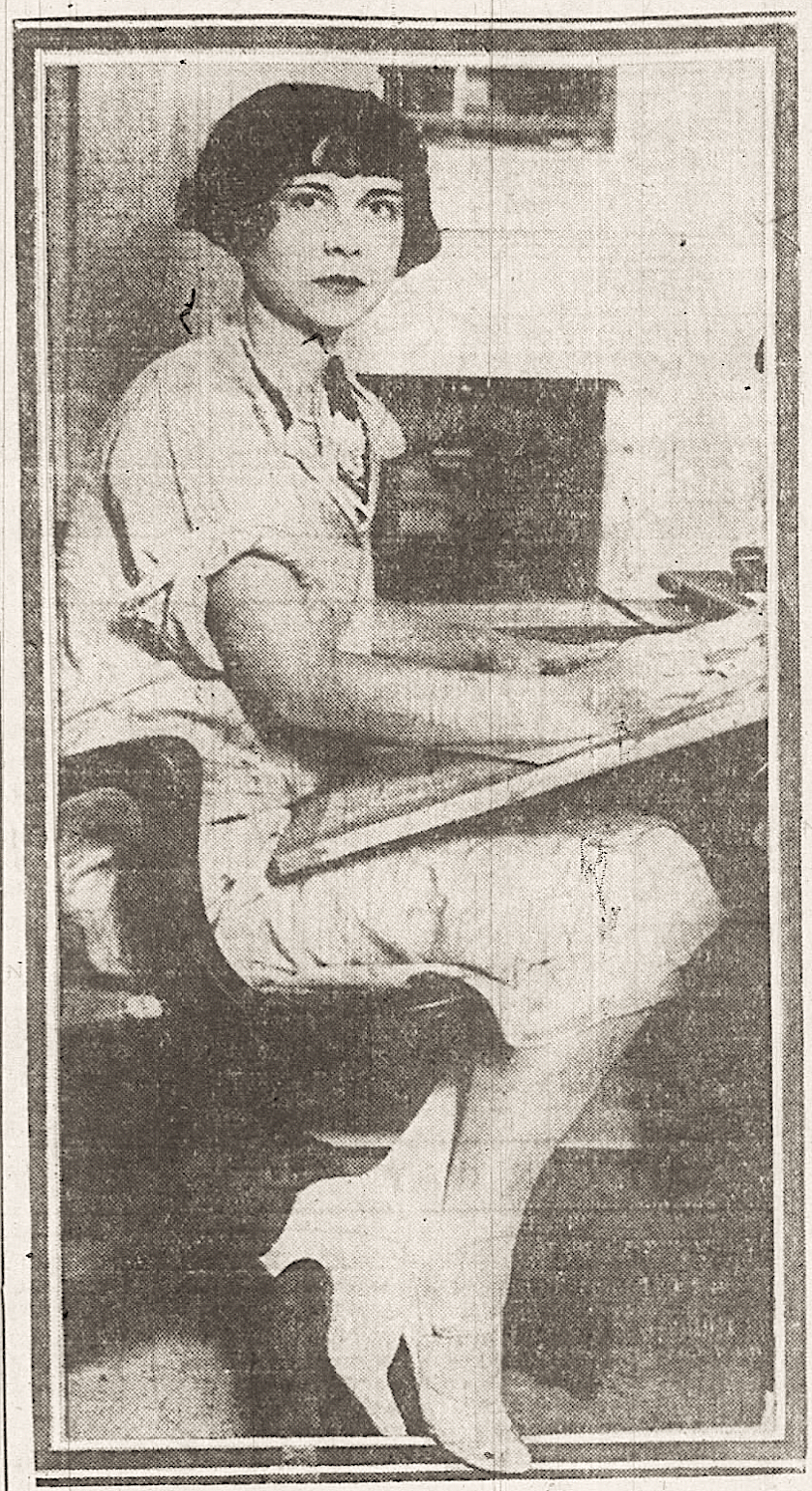
Gwen Wakeling in 1924

Gwendolyn Sewell Wakeling (March 3, 1901 – June 16, 1982) was an American costume designer who designed costumes for more than 140 films between the years 1924 and 1966. She began her career working for Cecil B. DeMille as an assistant designer on the 1924 film Feet of Clay. She collaborated with DeMille on many more films during her career, including her first film as a lead designer, The King of Kings (1927), and Samson and Delilah (1949). For the latter film she won the Academy Award for Best Costume Design at the 23rd Academy Awards in 1951.

Born in Detroit, Wakeling was the daughter of film editor and press agent Edith Wakeling. She worked initially as a self-taught designer, but later studied design formally with Maurice Leloir in Paris. After beginning her career with Pathé Exchange and on loan to Paramount Pictures, she worked for RKO Pictures in the early 1930s. She served as the director of costume design for Twentieth Century-Fox Film Corporation (initially just Fox) from 1933 to 1942. After this she worked as a freelance artist in Hollywood until designing for her final picture Frankie and Johnny (1966). She was also active as a designer for the theatre in the 1960s in several productions with the Los Angeles Civic Light Opera.

During her tenure at Twentieth Century-Fox Wakeling frequently collaborated with director John Ford, including designing for The Grapes of Wrath (1940) and How Green Was My Valley (1941) She also frequently designed for films starring Shirley Temple in the 1930s, and played an instrumental role in crafting Temple's image on screen. She later reunited with her for work on the television series Shirley Temple's Storybook (1958). One of her last television projects was creating Barbara Eden's signature look for the I Dream Of Jeannie television pilot in 1965. She lived in Los Angeles until her death in 1982 at the age of 81.

== Life and career ==
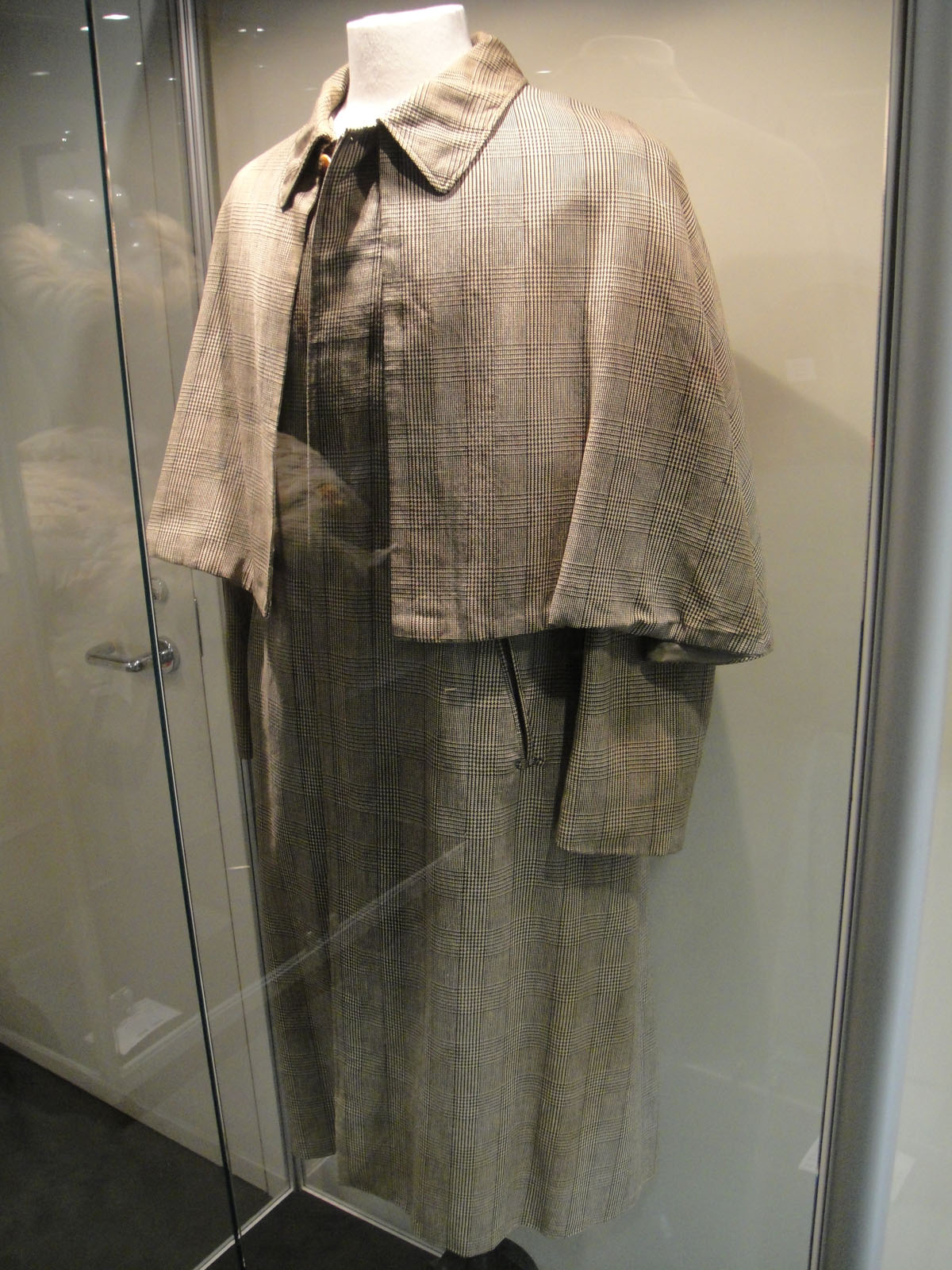
A costume designed by Wakeling for Basil Rathbone in The Adventures of Sherlock Holmes (1939).

The daughter of Otty and Edith Wakeling, Gwendolyn Sewell Wakeling was born in Detroit, Michigan, on March 3, 1901. Her father was a mining engineer who moved his family for work related reasons to first Seattle, and then Prescott, Arizona, before ultimately settling in Los Angeles, California. In Los Angeles her mother worked as a film editor and press agent. In 1919 Gwen signed as an actress with the Famous Players–Lasky studio, but ended up working in the costume design department in that studio for one year. She also worked for a department store making fashion sketches in the years following her high school graduation. By 1922 she was a member of the Hollywood Art Association which provided opportunities to attend art lectures and other art related events and activities.

Initially a largely self-taught costume designer, Wakeling studied design with Maurice Leloir in Paris. Her first significant opportunity in the field of costume design was for a new musical revue by Harry Carroll that was staged at the Orange Grove Theatre in Los Angeles in 1924. That same year she contributed costumes (not as the principal designer) to Cecil B. DeMille's film Feet of Clay (1924). She subsequently joined the costume department at Pathé Exchange where she rejoined with DeMille for her first credited film as a costume designer, the 1927 epic The King of Kings, for which she was co-designer with Earl Luick. That same year she married set designer and art director Burgess Beall. In addition to working at Pathé, she designed costumes for DeMille's films made for Paramount Pictures.

Between 1927 and 1966 Wakeling designed costumes for more than 140 films. In 1931 Pathé merged with RKO Pictures, and she briefly worked for RKO to finish up the films she had begun while under contract with Pathé that were now being finished by RKO. Some of the actresses she designed for at RKO included Pola Negri for A Woman Commands (1932), Constance Bennett for Lady with a Past (1932), and Ginger Rogers for Carnival Boat (1932).

In 1933 Wakeling became the head of costume design for the Fox Film Corporation (from 1935 Twentieth Century-Fox Film Corporation) and remained in that position through 1942. At Fox she designed the costumes for 14 of Shirley Temple's films, and played an instrumental role in crafting Temple's image. Some of Temple's films she designed for included The Littlest Rebel (1935), Dimples (1936), Poor Little Rich Girl (1936), Heidi (1937), Little Miss Broadway (1938), Rebecca of Sunnybrook Farm (1938), The Little Princess (1939), and Young People (1940) among others. At Twentieth Century-Fox she collaborated several times with director John Ford on such films as The Prisoner of Shark Island (1936), Submarine Patrol (1938), Drums Along the Mohawk (1939), The Grapes of Wrath (1940), and How Green Was My Valley (1941).

In 1940 Wakeling's first husband, Burgess Beall, died. The death of her husband in addition to a serious illness she suffered from a ruptured appendix in 1941 led Wakeling to resign from Twentieth Century-Fox in 1942. This coincided with her marriage to Henry J. Staudigl that same year. She left film design for a brief period to operate a salon with fellow designer Lewis Royer Hastings (known as Royer), a business which did not last long. She returned to costume design as a freelance artist for a variety of studios, among them Warner Bros., RKO, Republic Pictures, and Benedict Bogeaus Productions. She won an Academy Award for Best Costume Design for her work on DeMille's 1949 version of Samson and Delilah.

In 1958 Wakeling reunited with Temple to design the costumes for her television series Shirley Temple's Storybook. One of her last assignments was creating Barbara Eden's "Jeannie" costumes for the pilot episode of I Dream Of Jeannie in 1965 in which she envisioned the pink and ruby harem outfit that became associated with the character. In the 1960s she was active designing costumes on television for NBC and in the theatre for the Los Angeles Civic Light Opera.

Wakeling died in Los Angeles on June 16, 1982. She was a member of the Baháʼí Faith, and her husband, Henry J. Staudigl, set up an arts endowment in her name after her death at the Bosch Baháʼí School in Santa Cruz to promote artistic endeavors and included a research and resource library. A significant number of her fashion sketches were donated to the Margaret Herrick Library in 2000.

== Filmography ==
=== Film ===
- Feet of Clay (1924)
- The King of Kings (1927)
- A Harp in Hock (1927)
- The Girl in the Pullman (1927)
- The Desert Song (1929)
- Paris Bound (1929)
- Red Hot Rhythm (1929)
- Rich People (1929)
- This Thing Called Love (1929)
- His First Command (1929)
- The Racketeer (1929)
- Holiday (1930)
- Sin Takes a Holiday (1930)
- The Grand Parade (1930)
- Officer O'Brien (1930)
- Swing High (1930)
- Her Man (1930)
- Big Money (1930)
- The Big Shot (1931)
- The Common Law (1931)
- Suicide Fleet (1931)
- Freighters of Destiny (1931)
- Bad Company (1931)
- The Tip-Off (1931)
- Devotion (1931)
- The Big Gamble (1931)
- Rebound (1931)
- Born to Love (1931)
- Beyond Victory (1931)
- Lonely Wives (1931)
- The Painted Desert (1931)
- Prestige (1932)
- Carnival Boat (1932)
- Lady with a Past (1932)
- A Woman Commands (1932)
- Panama Flo (1932)
- Advice to the Lovelorn (1933)
- Broadway Thru a Keyhole (1933)
- Gallant Lady (1934)
- Transatlantic Merry-Go-Round (1934)
- The Affairs of Cellini (1934)
- The Count of Monte Cristo (1934)
- Born to Be Bad (1934)
- The Last Gentleman (1934)
- Looking for Trouble (1934)
- The House of Rothschild (1934)
- Moulin Rouge (1934)
- Bulldog Drummond Strikes Back (1934)
- The Littlest Rebel (1935)
- The Man Who Broke the Bank at Monte Carlo (1935)
- Banjo on My Knee (1936)
- White Hunter (1936)
- Pigskin Parade (1936)
- Dimples (1936)
- Ladies in Love (1936)
- Ramona (1936)
- Girls' Dormitory (1936)
- Poor Little Rich Girl (1936)
- The Road to Glory (1936)
- Half Angel (1936)
- Under Two Flags (1936)
- Captain January (1936)
- Ellis Island (1936)
- Everybody's Old Man (1936)
- The Country Doctor (1936)
- It Had to Happen (1936)
- Private Number (1936)
- The Prisoner of Shark Island (1936)
- King of Burlesque (1936)
- Second Honeymoon (1937)
- Ali Baba Goes to Town (1937)
- Heidi (1937)
- Danger – Love at Work (1937)
- Wife, Doctor and Nurse (1937)
- Love Under Fire (1937)
- Wake Up and Live (1937)
- Wee Willie Winkie (1937)
- Seventh Heaven (1937)
- Nancy Steele Is Missing! (1937)
- On the Avenue (1937)
- Suez (1938)
- Kentucky (1938)
- Thanks for Everything (1938)
- Just Around the Corner (1938)
- Submarine Patrol (1938)
- Straight, Place and Show (1938)
- Gateway (1938)
- I'll Give a Million (1938)
- Little Miss Broadway (1938)
- Three Blind Mice (1938)
- Kidnapped (1938)
- Alexander's Ragtime Band (1938)
- Rebecca of Sunnybrook Farm (1938)
- Sally, Irene and Mary (1938)
- The Baroness and the Butler (1938)
- Drums Along the Mohawk (1939)
- The Rains Came (1939)
- Wife, Husband and Friend (1939)
- The Adventures of Sherlock Holmes (1939)
- Hotel for Women (1939)
- Susannah of the Mounties (1939)
- The Gorilla (1939)
- The Return of the Cisco Kid (1939)
- The Hound of the Baskervilles (1939)
- The Little Princess (1939)
- Tail Spin (1939)
- The Blue Bird (1940)
- He Married His Wife (1940)
- Brigham Young (1940)
- Young People (1940)
- Star Dust (1940)
- Johnny Apollo (1940)
- The Grapes of Wrath (1940)
- Remember the Day (1941)
- Rise and Shine (1941)
- Citadel of Crime (1941)
- Confirm or Deny (1941)
- I Wake Up Screaming (1941)
- How Green Was My Valley (1941)
- Swamp Water (1941)
- Week-End in Havana (1941)
- International Lady (1941)
- A Man Betrayed (1941)
- Tales of Manhattan (1942)
- This Above All (1942)
- My Gal Sal (1942)
- To the Shores of Tripoli (1942)
- Rings on Her Fingers (1942)
- Roxie Hart (1942)
- Song of the Islands (1942)
- Moontide (1942)
- Son of Fury: The Story of Benjamin Blake (1942)
- Cover Girl (1944)
- Unconquered (1947)
- Samson and Delilah (1949)
- Valentino (1951)
- Plunder of the Sun (1953)
- Kiss Me Kate (1953)
- Track of the Cat (1954)
- Cattle Queen of Montana (1954)
- Silver Lode (1954)
- The High and the Mighty (1954)
- Passion (1954)
- Blood Alley (1955)
- Tennessee's Partner (1955)
- Escape to Burma (1955)
- Great Day in the Morning (1956)
- Johnny Concho (1956)
- The River's Edge (1957)
- From the Earth to the Moon (1958)
- Most Dangerous Man Alive (1961)
- Frankie and Johnny (1966)

=== Television ===
- Shirley Temple's Storybook (1958)
- Vacation Playhouse (1963)
- I Dream of Jeannie (1965)
