= It's Love I'm After =

1937 film by Archie Mayo

- Theatrical release poster
- Directed by: Archie Mayo
- Screenplay by: Casey Robinson
- Based on: "Gentlemen After Midnight" by Maurice Hanline
- Produced by: Harry Joe Brown; Hal B. Wallis
- Starring: Leslie Howard; Bette Davis; Olivia de Havilland
- Cinematography: James Van Trees
- Edited by: Owen Marks
- Music by: Heinz Roemheld
- Production company: First National Pictures
- Distributed by: Warner Bros. Pictures
- Release date: November 20, 1937 (USA)
- Running time: 90 minutes
- Country: United States
- Language: English

It's Love I'm After is a 1937 American screwball comedy film directed by Archie Mayo and starring Leslie Howard, Bette Davis, and Olivia de Havilland. Based on the story "Gentlemen After Midnight" by Maurice Hanline, with a screenplay by Casey Robinson, the film is about a couple who have postponed their marriage eleven times and who continue to plot and scheme their way to marriage. The film marked the third on-screen pairing of Leslie Howard and Bette Davis, following Of Human Bondage and The Petrified Forest.

== Plot ==
The film opens on New Year's Eve with a performance of Romeo and Juliet starring the celebrated acting duo, Basil Underwood and Joyce Arden. While they exhibit a passionate connection on stage, their off-stage relationship is a tempestuous cycle of arguments and reconciliations. They have been engaged eleven times, but their fiery personalities have always prevented them from actually marrying.

Following the performance, a young and wealthy debutante, Marcia West, who is completely captivated by Basil's portrayal of Romeo, visits him backstage. She declares her adoration for him, which Basil finds flattering, but it infuriates Joyce. This encounter is the catalyst for the film's central conflict.

Marcia's fiancé, Henry Grant, desperate to win her back, devises a plan. He asks Basil to visit the West's country home and act in a boorish and unpleasant manner to shatter Marcia's idealized image of him. Basil, seeing an opportunity to prove his love for Joyce by performing this "good deed," agrees to the plan.

However, the plan backfires spectacularly. Marcia interprets Basil's rude and outrageous behavior as a sign of his "honesty" and artistic temperament, causing her to fall for him even more deeply. Basil, in turn, begins to enjoy the unwavering adoration from Marcia, further fueling Joyce's jealousy and frustration.

The situation escalates with a series of comedic mishaps and misunderstandings. Basil's attempts to appear oafish are consistently misinterpreted by the infatuated Marcia. At one point, he even tries to "seduce" her, expecting her to be repulsed, but she is more than willing, forcing him to make a hasty retreat.

Joyce, unable to stand by and watch Basil be showered with affection, eventually arrives at the West's home, leading to more chaotic and hilarious confrontations. The film's climax involves a whirlwind of schemes and counter-schemes as Basil and Joyce navigate their feelings for each other amidst the farcical situation with Marcia. Ultimately, the couple's deep-seated love for each other prevails, and they finally decide to get married, leaving Marcia to reconcile with Henry.

== Cast ==
- Leslie Howard as Basil Underwood
- Bette Davis as Joyce Arden
- Olivia de Havilland as Marcia West
- Patric Knowles as Henry Grant Jr.
- Eric Blore as Digges
- George Barbier as William West
- Bonita Granville as Gracie Kane
- Spring Byington as Aunt Ella Paisley
- Georgia Caine as Mrs. Kane (as Georgia Craine)
- Veda Ann Borg as Elsie
- E. E. Clive as First Butler
- Valerie Bergere as Joyce's Maid
- Sarah Edwards as Mrs. Hinkle
- Thomas Pogue as Mr. Hinkle
- Grace Field as Mrs. Babson (as Grace Fields)
- Harvey Clark as Mr. Babson
- Edmund Mortimer as Mr. Kane (as Ed Mortimer)
- Thomas R. Mills as Second Butler (as Thomas Mills)
- Irving Bacon as Elevator Operator (uncredited)

== Production ==
Leslie Howard originally envisioned either Gertrude Lawrence or Ina Claire, both noted for their comedic stage performances, as his leading lady, although they had limited experience in films. Producer Hal B. Wallis had director Archie Mayo meet with Lawrence, who was interested in playing the role, but when Wallis and Howard screened the 1936 British film Men Are Not Gods, they agreed Lawrence did not photograph well.

The film began production without a leading lady. Then Wallis decided the screwball comedy would be a refreshing change-of-pace for Bette Davis, who had just completed the melodrama That Certain Woman. She initially declined the role of Joyce Arden, feeling the better female role was that of socialite Marcia West. She also resented being asked to accept second billing to Howard. Suffering from exhaustion, Davis went to Palm Springs to recuperate and finally agreed to appear in the film if Wallis would allow her some time for rest and relaxation. He insisted she report to work on March 28, 1937, and she replied, "Give me a week more . . . I must have a brief chance of being something more than a jittery old woman." She also asked Wallis to replace cinematographer James Van Trees with Tony Gaudio, one of the few cameramen she trusted, and the producer agreed, although Van Trees received sole screen credit.

== Reception ==
The film was generally well received by critics upon release. Frank S. Nugent of the The New York Times wrote, "Even in a screen season which has been rich in comedies, It’s Love I’m After must be reckoned among the gayest. It’s a rippling farce, brightly written and deftly directed … An agreeable change for Mr. Howard and Miss Davis and it fares extremely well at their hands."

Variety gave the film a positive review and described it as "fresh, clever, excellently directed and produced, and acted by an ensemble that clicks from start to finish." It stated that it was the best comedy in "many months."

Modern Screen’s Leo Townsend described the film as "high comedy stirred up to its frothiest state", adding that the story is "completely nonsensical" and "maintains a whirlwind pace that had a preview audience gasping for breath." He praised the cast, and wrote, "Davis and Howard are gloriously funny, and they barely manage to steal the picture out of the competent hands of Olivia de Havilland and Eric Blore."

Motion Picture Herald described the film as a "briskly played comedy", and in addressing comments to potential exhibitors, advised that this "manifestly saleable merchandise" should exploit the successes of Leslie Howard, Bette Davis and Olivia de Havilland in Of Human Bondage, The Petrified Forest and Anthony Adverse in their promotions, and if they failed to sell tickets, "Theatre for Sale" should be displayed on the marquee.

More recent appraisals are equally positive. Time described the film as "refreshing, impudent fun: a buoyant cinema making faces at its precise old aunt, the theatre."

In his review in Allmovie, Craig Butler called the film "unjustly neglected" and "a delightful romp that provides an excellent showcase for the often equally neglected comedic talents of its trio of stars. While Love falls just shy of true classic status - the screenplay is slightly off the mark in a few places and its dialogue occasionally lacks the effervescent sparkle that is a requirement of the genre - it's still a little gem of a picture with an abundance of laughs . . . a great pick-me-up and well worth searching out."

Channel 4 called the film "fast-moving and thoroughly enjoyable."

== Musical adaptation ==
It's Love I'm After is the basis of a stage musical comedy called Madly in Love, which interpolates songs by Vernon Duke with lyrics by Ira Gershwin, E.Y. Harburg, John LaTouche, Sammy Cahn, Ted Fetter, Martin Charnin, and Howard Dietz. Staged readings of the show have been presented by the Goodspeed Opera Company in East Haddam, Connecticut and the York Theater Company in New York City. A demo recording of the score features Karen Ziemba as Joyce Arden, Jay O. Sanders as Jeffrey Underwood, Brent Barrett as Henry Grant Jr., and Stuart Zagnit as Digges.
