= United States Smith =

1928 film

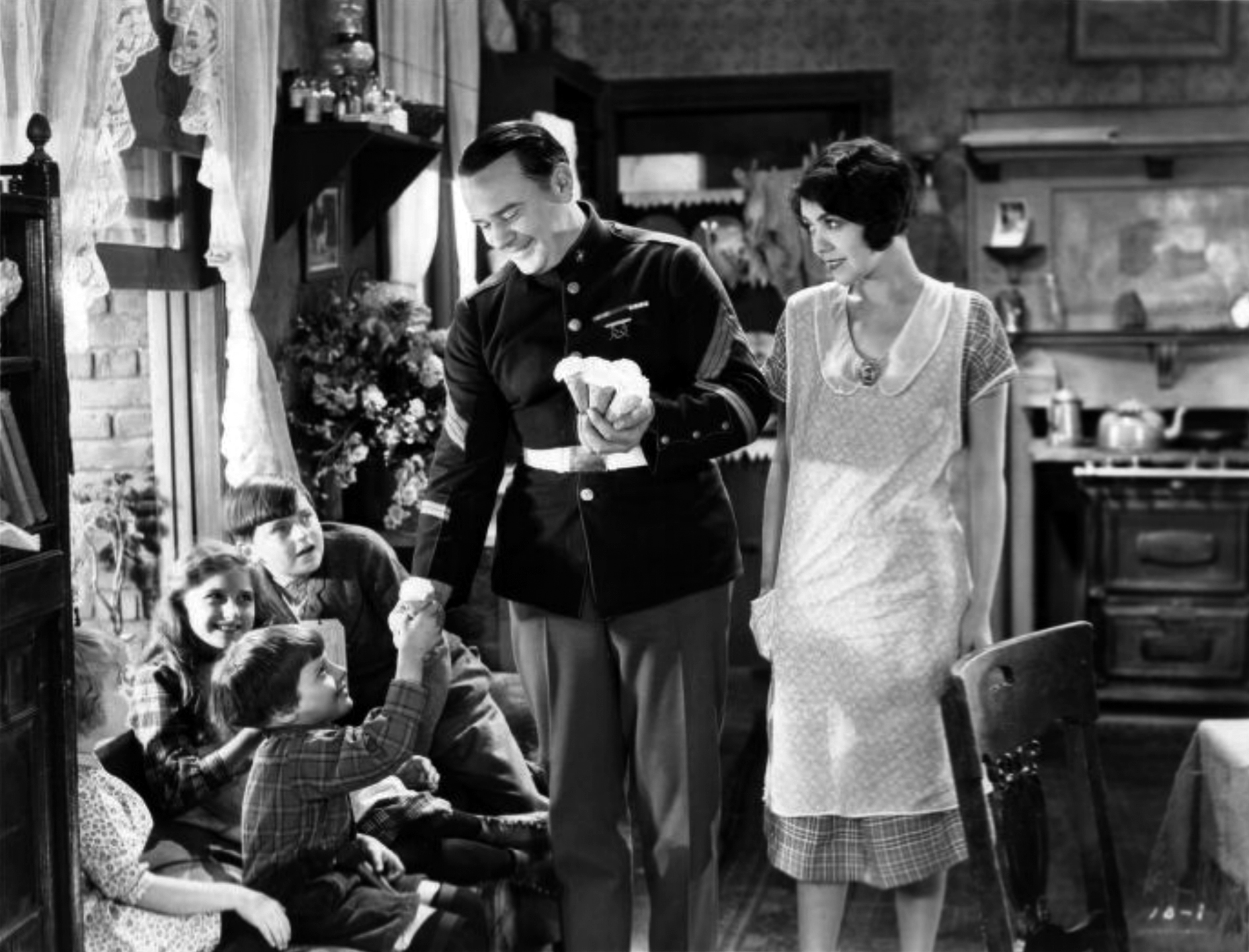
- Directed by: Joseph Henabery
- Written by: Gerald Beaumont; Curtis Benton; Casey Robinson; Louis Stevens
- Produced by: Samuel Sax; Harold Shumate
- Starring: Eddie Gribbon; Lila Lee; Kenneth Harlan
- Cinematography: Ray June
- Production company: Gotham Productions
- Distributed by: Lumas Film Corporation
- Release date: June 15, 1928
- Running time: 70 minutes
- Country: United States
- Languages: Silent; English intertitles

United States Smith is a 1928 American silent drama film directed by Joseph Henabery and starring Eddie Gribbon, Lila Lee and Kenneth Harlan.

== Cast ==
- Eddie Gribbon as Sgt. Steve Riley
- Lila Lee as Molly Malone
- Mickey Bennett as Ugo
- Kenneth Harlan as Cpl. Jim Sharkey
- Earle Marsh as Danny

== Bibliography ==
- Richard L. Hemenez. The United States Marine Corps in Books and the Performing Arts. McFarland, 2001.
