= Sinews of Steel =

1927 film

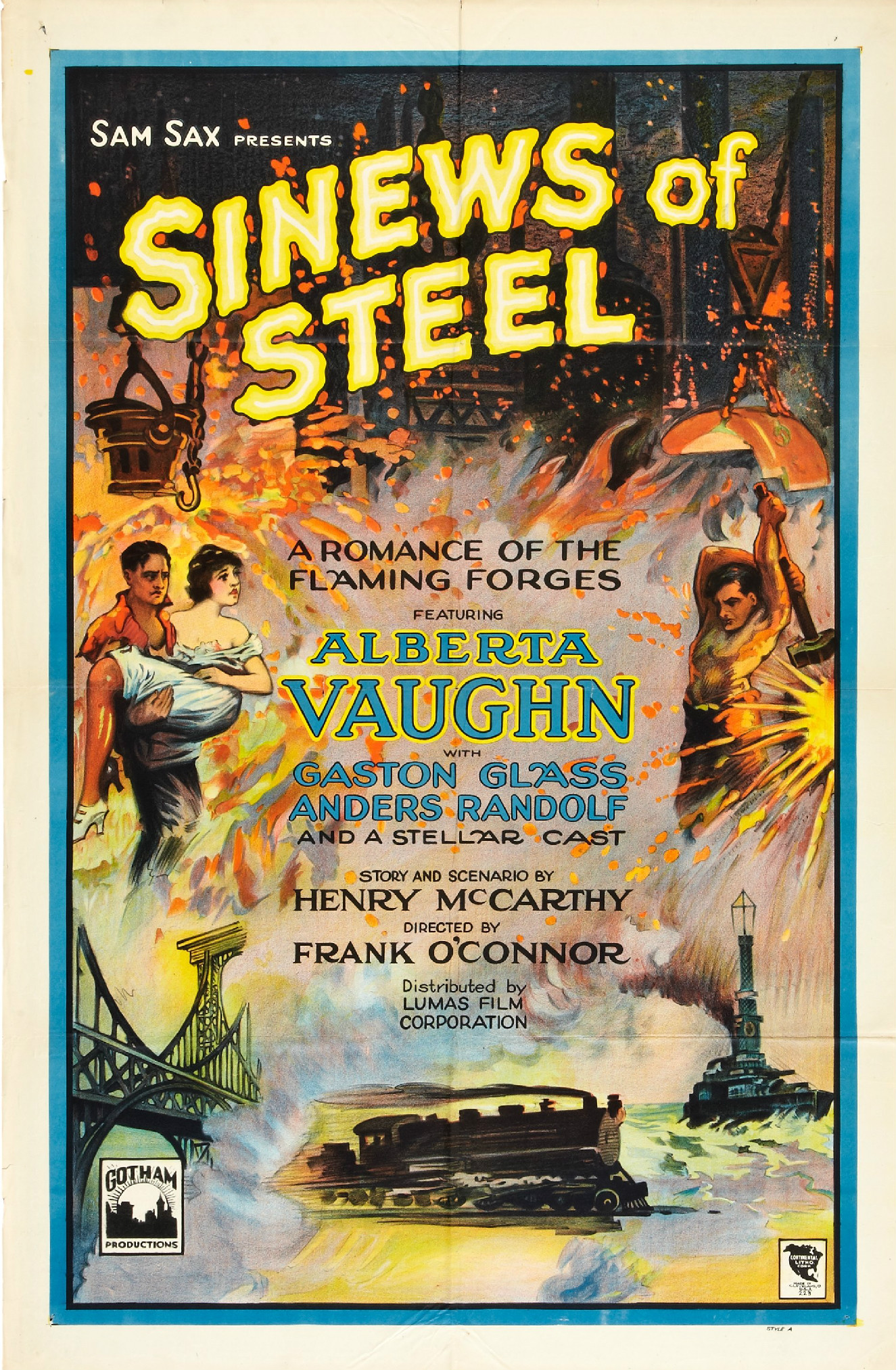
- Directed by: Frank O'Connor
- Written by: Herbert C. Clark; Henry McCarty; Delos Sutherland
- Produced by: Samuel Sax
- Starring: Alberta Vaughn; Gaston Glass; Anders Randolf
- Cinematography: Ray June
- Edited by: Edith Wakeling
- Production company: Gotham Productions
- Distributed by: Lumas Film Corporation
- Release date: April 4, 1927
- Running time: 60 minutes
- Country: United States
- Languages: Silent; English intertitles

Sinews of Steel is a 1927 American silent drama film directed by Frank O'Connor and starring Alberta Vaughn, Gaston Glass and Anders Randolf.

== Cast ==
- Alberta Vaughn as Helen Blake
- Gaston Glass as Robert McNeil Jr.
- Anders Randolf as Robert McNeil Sr.
- Paul Weigel as Jan Van Der Vetter
- Greta von Rue as Elsie Graham
- Nora Hayden as Martha Jenkins
- Charles Wellesley as Douglas Graham
- John H. Gardener as Elmer Price
- Robert Gordon as The Office Boy

== Bibliography ==
- Munden, Kenneth White. The American Film Institute Catalog of Motion Pictures Produced in the United States, Part 1. University of California Press, 1997.
