= Mountains of Manhattan =

1927 film

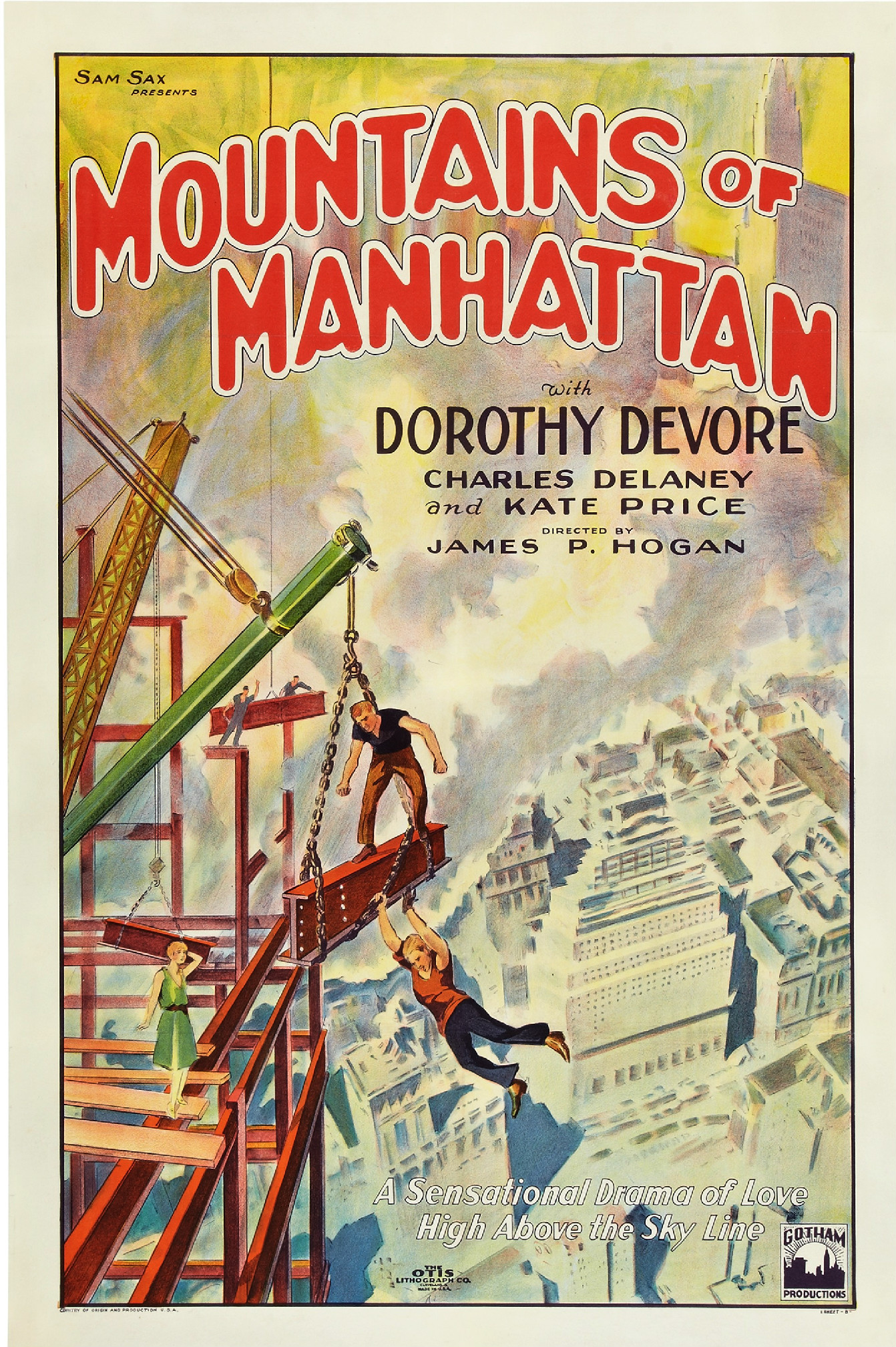
- Film poster
- Directed by: James P. Hogan
- Written by: Herbert C. Clark; Alyce Garrick; Delos Sutherland
- Produced by: Samuel Sax
- Starring: Dorothy Devore; Charles Delaney; Kate Price
- Cinematography: Ray June
- Edited by: Edith Wakeling
- Production company: Gotham Productions
- Distributed by: Lumas Film Corporation
- Release date: June 3, 1927
- Running time: 60 minutes
- Country: United States
- Language: Silent (English intertitles)

Mountains of Manhattan is a 1927 American silent drama film directed by James P. Hogan and starring Dorothy Devore, Charles Delaney, and Kate Price.

== Cast ==
- Dorothy Devore as Marion Wright
- Charles Delaney as Jerry Nolan
- Kate Price as 'Ma' Nolan
- Robert Gordon as Isadore Ginsberg
- George Chesebro as Hoyt Norcross
- James P. Hogan as 'Bull' Kerry
- Clarence Wilson as Jim Tully
- Robert Homans as 'Big Bill' Wright

== Bibliography ==
- Munden, Kenneth White. The American Film Institute Catalog of Motion Pictures Produced in the United States, Part 1. University of California Press, 1997.
