= Hey, Pop! =

- Directed by: Alfred J. Goulding
- Written by: Jack Henley; Glen Lambert
- Produced by: Samuel Sax
- Starring: Roscoe "Fatty" Arbuckle
- Production company: Warner Bros.
- Distributed by: Warner Bros.
- Release date: November 12, 1932
- Running time: 18 minutes
- Country: United States
- Language: English

Hey, Pop! is a 1932 American comedy film starring Roscoe "Fatty" Arbuckle. It was Arbuckle's comeback film, following an eleven-year absence from the screen caused by a 1921 scandal.

== Plot ==
Fatty is a chef in a New York restaurant, using short cuts and clever tricks in the kitchen to speed his short orders along. Meanwhile, in the dining area, a despondent woman leaves her young son Bill—and does not return. The gruff owner of the restaurant notices Bill being unattended all afternoon, and calls a local orphanage to take him away. Bill, fearing for his safety, pleads with Fatty for help. Fatty spirits Bill away and forfeits his job.

Bill is now rooming with Fatty, who tries in vain to find a new job and pay for groceries. He hits upon an ingenious plan to have food sent up to his room, with Bill as his confederate. In a last-ditch attempt to raise money quickly, Fatty disguises as a woman and enters Bill in a baby show, in hopes of collecting a cash prize.

== Cast ==
- Roscoe "Fatty" Arbuckle as Fatty the Chef
- Billy Hayes as Bill
- Connie Almy as Landlady
- Jack Shutta as Restaurant owner
- Dan Wolheim as Orphanage official
- Herschel Mayall as Contest judge

== Production ==
Roscoe Arbuckle had not starred in a film since 1921, and had been working behind the scenes—under a pseudonym—as a comedy writer and director. By 1932 he was making personal appearances in vaudeville. Sam Sax of Warner Bros. noted how the audiences welcomed him back, and signed Arbuckle in June 1932 for a two-reel (about 20 minutes) talking comedy, Hey, Pop! Filming began on Thursday, August 25, 1932 at Warner's Vitaphone studio in Brooklyn, New York. Like many Vitaphone comedies, street scenes were filmed on actual locations near the studio; the Norman Square Restaurant in Brooklyn's Greenpoint district is seen in an establishing shot. Arbuckle's new bride Addie McPhail was scheduled to co-star in Hey, Pop! but did not appear in the film, which has no romantic interest.

== Reception ==
The original agreement was for a single picture, so Sax could gauge public reaction before committing to a series. Feedback was overwhelmingly positive, and Sax took up Arbuckle's option for five more shorts. Sax issued a press release under his own name, heralding the comedian's triumphant return: "Fatty Arbuckle is right back to where he was 12 or 13 years ago. By cutting down his dialogue and using more pantomime, we find him registering laugh after laugh."

"Unquestionably the short is box office," reported Variety. "Arbuckle's reappearance on the screen is enough to bring business and warrants the name out in lights, plus other attention from the theatre. About 75% of the short is pantomime, Fatty saying little throughout its 18 minutes. He wears the too-short balloon trousers and other accoutrements of another day and appears entirely familiar in every way."

Theater owners took the hint and publicized Hey, Pop! vigorously. Missouri: "Billed this heavily as Fatty's first talkie and I believe the comedy drew almost as many as the feature." Idaho: "Fatty comes back strong. Many and loud were the laughs during the run of this comedy. Arbuckle will make good, and should be producing regular." Michigan: "Having shown all the Arbuckle comedies in the long, long ago, I wondered what the new ones would be like. Fatty hardly look a day older. His speaking voice is very good. These comedies are much above the average of the slapstick comedies of today."

== See also ==
- Fatty Arbuckle filmography
