= Bare Knees =

1928 film

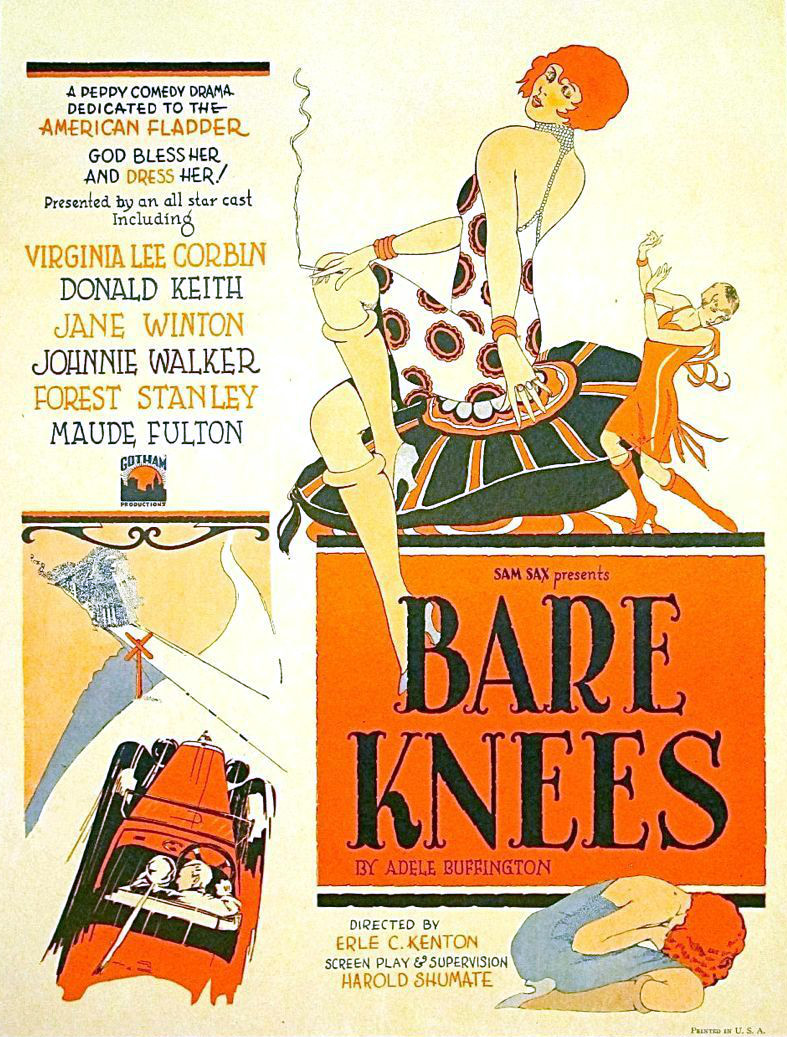
- Directed by: Erle C. Kenton
- Written by: Harold Shumate (adaptation); Casey Robinson (intertitles)
- Story by: Adele Buffington
- Produced by: Sam Sax; Harold Shumate
- Starring: Virginia Lee Corbin
- Cinematography: James Diamond
- Edited by: W. Donn Hayes
- Production company: Gotham Pictures
- Distributed by: Lumas Film Corporation
- Release date: February 1, 1928
- Running time: 61 minutes
- Country: United States
- Language: Silent (English intertitles)

Bare Knees is a 1928 American silent comedy drama film directed by Erle C. Kenton and starring Virginia Lee Corbin.

== Plot ==
Billie Durey, the family's black sheep, returns to her small hometown and causes a sensation with her short skirts, cigarettes, and other "flapper" accoutrements.

== Cast ==
- Virginia Lee Corbin as Billie Durey
- Donald Keith as Larry Cook
- Jane Winton as Jane Longworth
- Johnnie Walker a Paul Gladden
- Forrest Stanley as John Longworth
- Maude Fulton as Bessie
- Ernie Adams as Clerk (uncredited)
- William H. O'Brien as Waiter (uncredited)
- Ellinor Vanderveer as Society Woman (uncredited)

== Preservation ==
A print of Bare Knees is in the collection of the Library of Congress. The film is available on DVD (along with the 1928 Hairbreadth Harry comedy Danger Ahead) from Grapevine Video, transferred from this 35mm nitrate print.
