= Scobie Malone (film) =

- DVD cover
- Directed by: Terry Ohlsson
- Written by: Casey Robinson; Graham Woodlock
- Based on: Helga's Web by Jon Cleary
- Produced by: Casey Robinson
- Starring: Jack Thompson; Judy Morris
- Cinematography: Keith Lambert
- Edited by: Bill Stacey
- Music by: Peter Clarke
- Production companies: Kingcroft Australia; Rampton Pty Ltd
- Release date: 3 October 1975
- Running time: 98 minutes
- Country: Australia
- Language: English
- Budget: AU$300,000

Scobie Malone (also known as Helga's Web and Murder at the Opera House) is a 1975 Australian erotic mystery film based on the 1970 novel Helga's Web by Jon Cleary and starring Jack Thompson and Judy Morris.

It was reportedly the first movie to extensively feature the Sydney Opera House.

== Synopsis ==
Sydney homicide detective Sergeant Scobie Malone (Jack Thompson) and his offsider (Shane Porteous) investigate the murder of Helga (Judy Morris), whose corpse is found in the basement of the Sydney Opera House.

Malone had met Helga previously and discovers she was a high class prostitute who was also a mistress of the Minister for Culture (James Workman) and involved with film director Jack Savannah (Joe Martin). In flashback it is shown that Helga was blackmailing the minister and his wife (Jacqueline Kott), along with a crime boss, Mr Sin (Noel Ferrier).

Eventually it is revealed that Helga was killed while fleeing Captain Bixby (Fred "Cul" Cullen). Malone becomes convinced of the guilt of the Minister, but powerful influences intervene and he gets off. The Minister resigns, citing ill health, and travels to Europe with his wife. Malone criticises his boss, Inspector Fulmer (Walter Sullivan) and is suspended for insubordination for ninety days. Fulmer later suggests he come back, but Scobie elects to stay by the pool for the full ninety days.

== Cast ==
- Jack Thompson as Scobie Malone
- Judy Morris as Helga Brand
- Shane Porteous as Russ
- Noel Ferrier as Mr Sin
- Jacqueline Kott as Norma Halidon
- James Condon as Walter Halidon
- Joe Martin as Jack Savanna
- Fred "Cul" Cullen as Captain Bixby
- Walter Sullivan as Inspector Fulmer
- Max Meldrum as Scientific Officer
- Ken Goodlet as the Premier
- Joe James as the Attorney General
- Victoria Anoux as Becky
- Zoe Salmon as Angie
- Bunkie King as Jackie
- Peter McLean as Photographer
- Len London as the Police Commissioner
- Barbara Mason as Socialite
- Faye Donaldson as Socialite
- Maggie Blinco as Landlady
- Di Bergan as The Maid
- David Bradley as Detective
- Guy Peniston Bird as Detective
- Judy McBurney as Girl at pedestrian crossing
- Bryan Brown as Policeman (as "Brian Bronn")
- Kevin Manser

== Production ==
Jon Cleary's novel Helga's Web was his second featuring the detective Scobie Malone. The first, The High Commissioner, had been turned into a 1968 British-American film starring Rod Taylor as Malone.

The film rights to Helga's Web were originally purchased by Brian Chirlian and John Shore, who hired Cleary to write a screenplay. Casey Robinson, a famous Hollywood screenwriter who had retired to Sydney three years earlier with his Australian wife Joan, then became involved as producer. He did not like Cleary's adaptation and elected to write the script himself in collaboration with another writer. Some key changes were made from the book - notably turning Scobie Malone into a womaniser who lives in a singles-only apartment block and has sex with a large number of women, including air hostesses whose name he can't remember.

According to The Bulletin, "in Jon Cleary’s novel [Malone] takes his ironing home every week to his mother and has been known to drink at a Leagues Club. Scobie as Jack Thompson plays him in the film lives in a singles apartment building with a swimming pool and a lot of topless neighbors and has air hostesses for breakfast."

Robinson managed to pre-sell the film to America, one of the first times this had been done for an Australian film. US$200,000 of the budget was raised from the Australian Film Development Corporation, with the rest coming from private investment. (The AFDC accounts said it invested $150,000.) Robinson said he did not seek money overseas because he believed "that if one is operating in Australia - and I'm an Australian resident - then one should operate purely as an Australian producer so that the profits will remain here."

"Seventy five per cent of the money for independent productions in America is put up by' the Bank of America", said Robinson. "In Australia, the banks just won't look at youi saying they've never tried it." He claimed Australian films "have a 100 percent record of failure, because they have, been too local and only geared to Australian Idioms."

The movie was one of nine the AFDC financed in 1975, others being Picnic at Hanging Rock, The Man From Hong Kong, Sunday Too Far Away', The Devil's Playground, The Trespassers, The Box and A Salute To The Great McCarthy.

Jack Thompson, who had become a star in Petersen was cast in the title role. "Jack Thompson is a great part of my reason to become involved in this venture", said Robinson at the time. "I have no doubt whatsoever that when this film is seen overseas he'll be turned instantly into an international star. There aren't many male actors like him around any more. There's something there that reminds me very much of Bogart."

Thompson said "working with Casey is a complete eye opener. My career so far has been in movies where the director is practically thinking up dialogue as we go along, but Casey's whole craft is having the whole picture there, in the script, even if you don't see it all when you read through. Working with Casey is like working with the whole history and know-how of movie making. There just aren't people around any more, particularly in Australia, who know the things Casey knows."

The film was made through Kingcroft Productions, who specialised in commercials. One of their regular directors was Terry Ohlsson, who directed Scobie Malone. Ohlsson had just made the 1973 sponsored drama The Carmakers.

John Shaw, associate producer and production supervisor at Kingcroft, said "It is very much a modern day story set in Sydney now - it's Australian. We are portraying Sydney as it really is, there isn't a koala bear or kangaroo in it."

Joe Martin was better known as a nightclub entertainer.

=== Filming ===
The film was shot in the autumn of 1975. One of the women Jack Thompson sleeps with in the film is played by Bunkie King, one of two sisters he lived with in real life in a ménage à trois for fifteen years, with the other sister, Lee King, appearing in poolside scenes.

The film is also notable for the first screen appearance of actor Bryan Brown, who appears early in the film as a policeman, delivering two lines. He is listed last in the credits as "Brian Bronn".

== Reception ==
Cleary was shown the film at a private screening and was not happy with the result. "When I saw Scobie nibbling on the fourth nipple I thought "that's not my Scobie". And I walked out", he said.

The movie received poor reviews and did badly at the box office, despite Jack Thompson coming off two hits with Petersen (1974) and Sunday Too Far Away (1975).

=== Critical ===
The Sydney Sun Herald wrote "the novel is nothing out of the box and neither is the movie. At the same time, it's good entertainment that keeps your attention without draining you emotionally. Males will no doubt love the super bonus of bare bosums... Jack is fine as the cop. He has great potential."

Colin Benntt of The Age wrote Robinson "must surely have been watching a lot of Crawfords and B quickies of the forties and fifties. He has merely added a lot more blood and bed." Bennett felt Thompson "makes his usual workmanlike attempt" and "he gets least help of all from a camera which, when not staring flatly at brightly lit sets and characters, seems most concerned with Sydney traveloguing."

The Canberra Times wrote "the film for most of its length is a travesty of something that has been done better before and will be again... the film's only moment of splendour comes in the inevitable chase down among the machinery and Helga's death at the hands of a tomahawk-wielding moron. The sequence has a tension that works, which is more than can be said for any other in the film."

The Bulletin said the film contained "the worst performances Jack Thompson and Judy Morris have given anywhere. But that doesn’t mean that they’re worse than anyone else in the film...the script... makes an extremely desperate and embarrassingly thread-bare effort to substitute comedy for action... a mine of sexual cliches...Helga’s Web was probably not easy to adapt. It’s built on flashbacks and it has an awkward ending, but it does not deserve to be destroyed quite as decisively as it is here."

The Sydney Morning Herald wrote "the Opera House is more exciting than the plot...the actor's skills disguise the triteness of the roles... The film, though trivial, has [ace and tension... The film is too melodramatic to be good. Sometimes it is quite laughable in its scenes of villainy"

According to David Stratton:

The film cries out for the smart film noir treatment so hard to recapture in the seventies with the benefits of Eastman Colour, but director Terry Ohlsson hardly seems to try. The film is desultory, frequently ludicrous and somewhat desperately beefed up with the introduction of dozens of naked ladies, all eyeing Mr Thompson lasciviously. Even the normally capable actors can do nothing with their roles, and Thompson — who always needs firm direction — seems especially unhappy as Malone. Scobie Malone is one of the most disappointing films of the decade and was a commercial and critical disaster.

== Legacy ==
Clips from the film were featured in the extended version of the documentary Not Quite Hollywood (2008).

== Songs ==
- "Scobie Malone"
- "Helga's Web"
