= King of the Pack =

1926 film

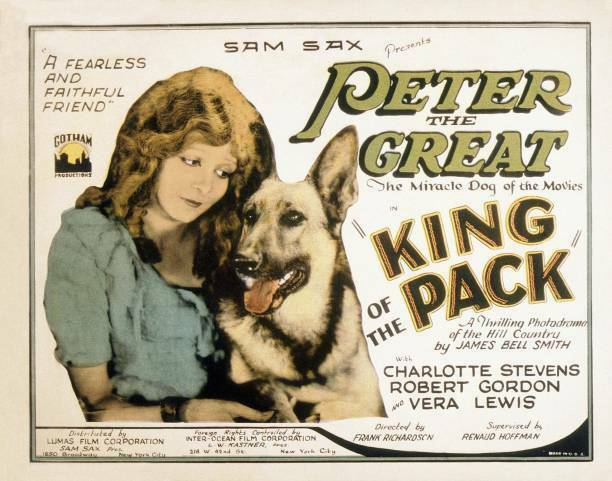
- Directed by: Frank Richardson
- Written by: Delos Sutherland; James Bell Smith
- Produced by: Renaud Hoffman; Samuel Sax
- Starring: Charlotte Stevens; Robert Gordon; Vera Lewis
- Cinematography: Ray June
- Production company: Gotham Pictures
- Distributed by: Lumas Film Corporation; Gaumont British Distributors (UK)
- Release date: October 5, 1926
- Running time: 65 minutes
- Country: United States
- Language: Silent (English intertitles)

King of the Pack is a 1926 American silent adventure film directed by Frank Richardson and starring Charlotte Stevens, Robert Gordon, and Vera Lewis. Produced by the independent Gotham Pictures, it was designed as a vehicle for Peter the Great, one of several dog stars to appear in films during the 1920s.

== Plot ==
As described in a film magazine review, young Selah Blair suffers at the hands of her brutal stepmother, the hardened mountain woman 'Widder' Gasper. With her companion dog King she saves a young woman, and the wealthy father rewards her with the gift of $1,000. Her stepmother plots to get rid of Selah so that she will get the money. With her henchman Chuck Purdy and her half-wit son Bud, she captures the runaway Selah and hold her captive in a cave. When Selah refuses to tell where she hid the money, the widow leaves Selah to die. However, her faithful dog King and her rural sweetheart Clint Sifton work together to rescue her and eventually the widow topples off a mountainside to her death.

== Cast ==
- Fellow (Credited as Peter the Great) as King, a Dog
- Charlotte Stevens as Selah Blair
- Robert Gordon as Clint Sifton
- Vera Lewis as 'Widder' Gasper
- Mary Cornwallis as Kitty Carlyle
- Danny Hoy as Bud Gasper
- Frank Brownlee as Chuck Purdy
- W.H. Davis as Sam Blair
- Frank Norcross as Dr. Joe Stoddard

== Preservation ==
A print of King of the Pack is in the Archives Du Film Du CNC.

== Bibliography ==
- Connelly, Robert B. (1998). The Silents: Silent Feature Films, 1910-36, Volume 40, Issue 2. December Press. ISBN 9780913204368.
- Kenneth White, Munden (1997). The American Film Institute Catalog of Motion Pictures Produced in the United States, Part 1. University of California Press. ISBN 9780520209695.
