= Shotgun Pass =

1931 film

- Directed by: J.P. McGowan
- Written by: Robert Quigley
- Starring: Tim McCoy; Virginia Lee Corbin; Monte Vandergrift
- Cinematography: Benjamin H. Kline
- Edited by: S. Roy Luby
- Production company: Columbia Pictures
- Distributed by: Columbia Pictures
- Release date: November 1, 1931
- Running time: 58 minutes
- Country: United States
- Language: English

Shotgun Pass is a 1931 American Western film directed by J.P. McGowan and starring Tim McCoy, Virginia Lee Corbin and Monte Vandergrift.

== Plot ==
Brothers Jake and Spider Mitchell conflict with Walker over access to land that he has rented from his girlfriend's father. They first try to charge a toll, then try to kill the real owner, and finally begin to build a fence. Walker's sidekick, Sagebrush, dynamites the fence, and a resulting stampede of horses kills the brothers.

== Cast ==
- Tim McCoy as Tim Walker
- Virginia Lee Corbin as Sally Seagrue
- Monte Vandergrift as Jake Mitchell
- Frank Rice as Sagebrush
- Joe Smith Marba as Spider Mitchell
- Dick Stewart as Lon Seagrue
- Ben Corbett as Shorty
- Harry Todd as Sheriff Pete

== Bibliography ==
- Pitts, Michael R. Western Movies: A Guide to 5,105 Feature Films. McFarland, 2012.
