= Samuel Sax =

American producer (1880–1962)

- Born: September 5, 1880; Pittsburgh, Pennsylvania, USA
- Died: January 2, 1962 (aged 81); Hollywood, California, USA
- Years active: 1925-1946

Samuel Sax (September 5, 1880 –January 2, 1962) was an American film producer. He produced 80 films between 1925 and 1946, including the last films of Roscoe Arbuckle. From 1938 to 1941, Sax headed Warner Brothers's British subsidiary at Teddington Studios in London.

== Career at Vitaphone: 1931-1939 ==
During the late silent film era, Sax owned his own Hollywood poverty row outfit, Gotham Studios. In late 1931 Sax, considered “a no-nonsense studio executive of the old school”, began work with Warner Brothers as general production manager for their Brooklyn Vitaphone facility.

Sax embarked upon his duties during the severest phase of the Great Depression, corresponding to a general collapse in studio box-office receipts. As such, Sax’s task was to reorganize production of Warners one- and two-reel shorts, “films that could be sold without difficulty anywhere in the country”, so as to maximize short-term profits. Indeed, many of the major studios curtailed feature production in favor of shorts during the financial crisis, limited mostly to comedies and light musicals. Most of these were produced in the New York area due to its local talent pool, including Broadway cast members enlisted to appear in screen talkies. The organizational methods Sax included highly structured and disciplined work schedules enforced by the trade unions, which banned overtime and providing film product delivered at or under budget.

Sam Sax emerged as an outstanding practitioner of the studio “factory” system for short film production in Brooklyn, rivaling Hollywood production methods. In 1935, Sax defended his “film factory” approach to filmmaking in a New York Sun interview:

“We work unlike any other studio in the country. We keep factory hours - 9 to 5 - and turn out a steady amount of movie footage, rain or shine, come what may. Our schedule calls for two shorts per week. And we haven’t slipped up on this in the six [sic] years I’ve been running this place for Warner Brothers. We start a picture Monday morning, finish it Wednesday evening....And we’re ready to start shooting the next one bright and early Thursday morning, finishing up Saturday evening, which gives the carpenters time to build the new sets. Everyone has a holiday Sunday-and we try to [see that] folks get legal holidays- a most unusual thing in the movie business.”

By 1938, Sax was presiding over the filming of about 140 reels of shorts per year for Warners, each with an average screen duration of 5 or 6 minutes. As to the quality of these shorts, film historian Richard Koszarski observes “Sax proved to be the most consistently successful producer of high-quality short films in the East [i.e. East Coast].”

The Vitaphone operations were greatly enhanced by the abundant entertainment troupes and entertainers who could moonlight briefly on film short productions, without compromising their stage or vaudeville commitments. Sax reported that as many as five thousand of these entertainers appeared in his shorts annually, in addition to his contracted talent of over 600. In an effort to profitably utilize all available footage, Sax devised the assembly of “vaudeville compilations”, unrelated snippets of “one forgotten act after another” used to create entertaining shorts that had little thematic unity. Comedian Roscoe “Fatty” Arbuckle attempted to resume his screen career with six two-reelers at Vitagraph’s Big V Comedies logo under Sax’s auspices and were well-received. Arbuckle died shortly after completing these comedies and before his Tomalio (1933), directed by Ray McCarey was released.

Warner brothers, despite a major investment in a 26,000-square-foot, state-of-the-art studio in Brooklyn, was already relocating short film operations to their Burbank, California studio. By April 15, 1939, the move was complete. Sax was transferred to England to manage Warners’ Teddington Studios in London. In 1940 Sax was back in Hollywood promoting Phonovision.

Sax would produce his final film with Producers Releasing Corporation in 1945, Why Girls Leave Home.

== Selected filmography ==
- Unmarried Wives (1924)
- The Part Time Wife (1925)
- The Shadow on the Wall (1925)
- The Night Ship (1925)
- One of the Bravest (1925)
- His Master's Voice (1925)
- Women and Gold (1925)
- Silent Pal (1925)
- The Winning Wallop (1926)
- The Block Signal (1926)
- Racing Blood (1926)
- King of the Pack (1926)
- The Sign of the Claw (1926)
- The Phantom of the Forest (1926)
- Sinews of Steel (1927)
- The Woman Who Did Not Care (1927)
- Mountains of Manhattan (1927)
- Quarantined Rivals (1927)
- Catch-As-Catch-Can (1927)
- The Silent Avenger (1927)
- When Danger Calls (1927)
- One Chance in a Million (1927)
- The Final Extra (1927)
- The Down Grade (1927)
- The Girl from Rio (1927)
- Bare Knees (1928)
- United States Smith (1928)
- The Head of the Family (1928)
- Midnight Life (1928)
- Times Square (1929)
- The Silent Partner (1931)
- In the Dough (1932)
- Hey, Pop! (1932)
- Buzzin' Around (1933)
- How've You Bean? (1933)
- Close Relations (1933)
- Tomalio (1933)
- Paree, Paree (1934)
- Double or Nothing (1936)
- Confidential Lady (1939)
- The Midas Touch (1940)
- His Brother's Keeper (1940)
- Hoots Mon! (1940)

== Sources ==
- Baxter, John. 1970. Hollywood in the Thirties. International Film Guide Series. Paperback Library, New York. LOC Card Number 68–24003.
- Hutchinson, Ron. 2018. Vitaphone View: Vitaphone’s Most Prolific Director, Joseph Henabery. Classic Movie Hub. https://www.classicmoviehub.com/blog/vitaphone-view-vitaphones-most-prolific-director/ Retrieved 30 July 2021.
- Koszarski, Richard. 2008. Hollywood on the Hudson: Film and Television in New York from Griffith to Sarnoff. Rutgers University Press. ISBN 978-0-8135-4293-5
