= Virginia Lee Corbin =

American actress (1910–1942)

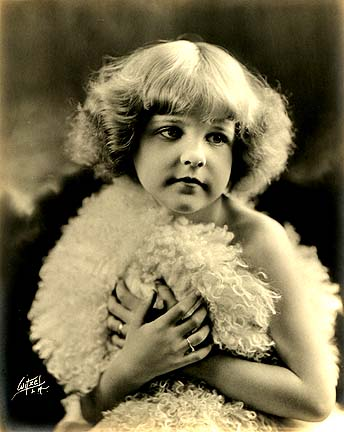
- Born: 1911 or 1912; Prescott, Arizona, U.S.
- Died: June 5, 1942 (aged 31); Chicago, Illinois, U.S.
- Burial place: Westlawn Cemetery
- Occupation: Actress
- Years active: 1913–1931
- Spouse(s): Theodore Krol (1929–1937; divorced); 2 children Charles Jacobson (m. 193?)
- Children: 2

Virginia Lee Corbin (1911 or 1912 – June 4, 1942) was an American silent film actress.

== Early years ==
Corbin was born Laverne Virginia Corbin in Prescott, Arizona to Leon Ernest Corbin and Virginia Frances (Cox) Corbin, and she had a sister, Ruth Emilie (Corbin) Miehle De Vries Lipari.

== Career ==
Corbin began her career as a child actress in 1916, when she was billed as Baby Virginia Corbin. When she was six years old, she starred in fairy-tale films made by the William Fox Company. The success of Jack and the Beanstalk (1917) was such that Fox signed Corbin to a five-year contract. In addition to her salary, the contract specified that the company would provide instruction for her education.

She went on to become a youthful flapper in the 1920s. She was one of the many silent stars that would not make it in the sound era, and retired from acting in the early 1930s.

Corbin was named one of the WAMPAS Baby Stars of 1925. She also had a nervous breakdown in 1925, causing her to miss making films. Films in which she starred included Alladin and the Wonderful Lamp,The City That Never Sleeps, Knee High, The Perfect Sap, and Hands Up. Her career ended with her working as an extra in 1940.

== Personal life and death ==
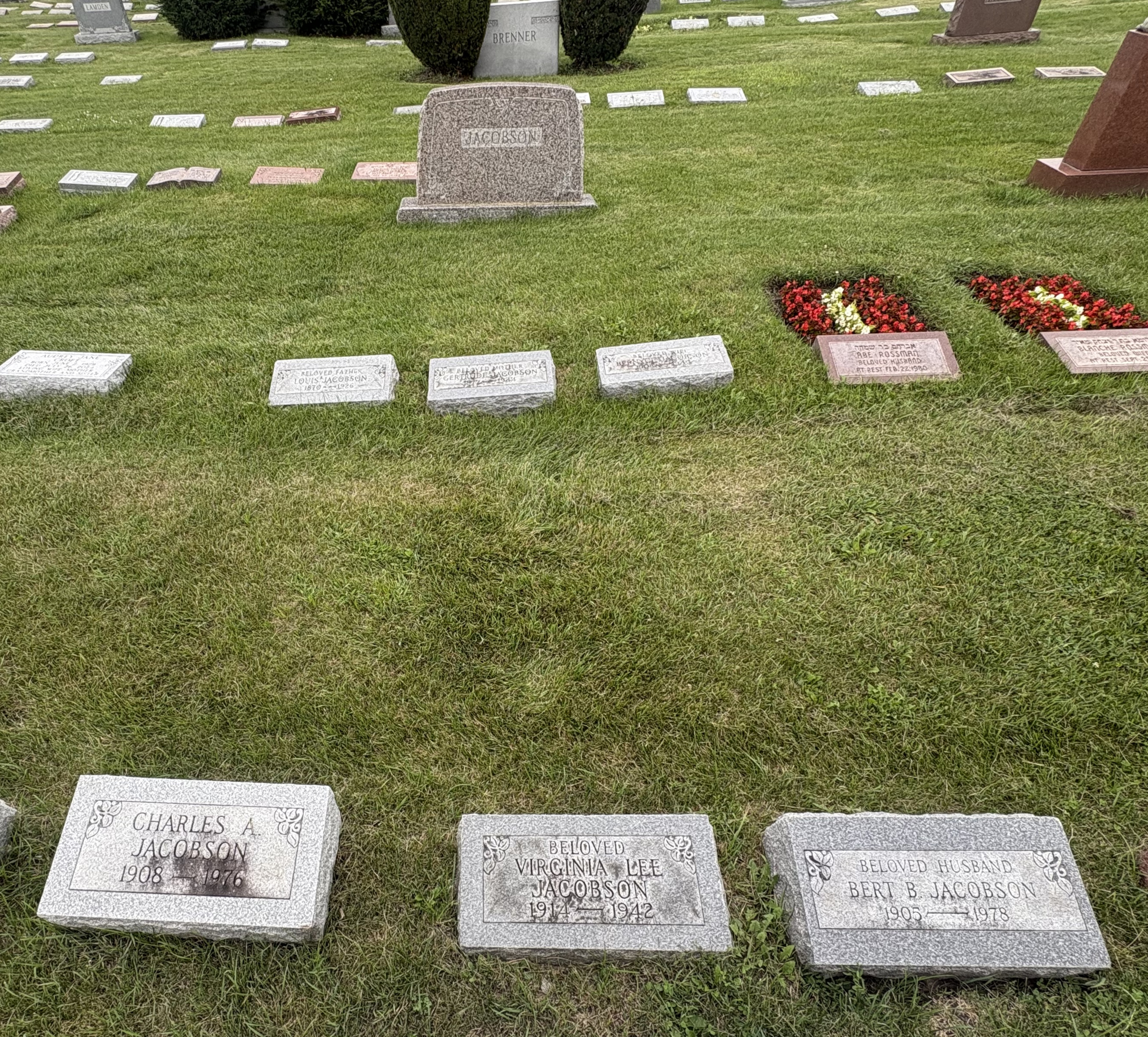
Corbin's grave (front center) at Westlawn Cemetery

She married New York broker Theodore Krol in 1929, retiring from films for the marriage, and they had two children, Harold Phillip and Robert Lee. They divorced in 1937 and shortly after she married another Chicago stockbroker, Charles Jacobson.

Corbin died of tuberculosis on June 4, 1942, in Winfield, Illinois, aged 30, and was buried at Westlawn Cemetery.

== Partial filmography ==
- Let Katie Do It (1916) – Child (uncredited)
- Intolerance (1916) – Child in Epilogue (uncredited)
- Pidgin Island (1916) – Minor Role (uncredited)
- Heart Strings (1917) – Johanna – as a child
- Vengeance of the Dead (1917, Short)
- Jack and the Beanstalk (1917) – Virginia / Princess Regina
- Aladdin and the Wonderful Lamp (1917) – Princess Badr al-badr
- The Babes in the Woods (1917) – Rose / Gretel
- Treasure Island (1917) – Louise Trelawney
- Six-Shooter Andy (1918) – Susan's Sister (uncredited)
- Ace High (1918) – Annette Dupre (child)
- Fan Fan (1918) – Fan Fan
- The Forbidden Room (1919) – Virginia Clark
- The White Dove (1920) – Dorothy Lanyon
- Enemies of Children (1923)
- The Cafe of Fallen Angels (1923)
- Fight and Win (1924)
- Wine of Youth (1924) – Flapper
- Sinners in Silk (1924) – Flapper
- The City That Never Sleeps (1924) – Molly Kendall
- Broken Laws (1924) – Patsy Heath – age 16
- The Chorus Lady (1924) – Nora O'Brien
- Three Keys (1925) – Edna Trevor
- The Cloud Rider (1925) – Blythe Wingate
- Lilies of the Streets (1925) – Judith Lee
- Headlines (1925) – 'Bobby' Dale
- The Handsome Brute (1925) – Nelly Egan
- North Star (1925) – Marcia Gale
- Hands Up! (1926) – Alice Woodstock
- The Honeymoon Express (1926) – Becky
- Ladies at Play (1926) – Dotty
- The Whole Town's Talking (1926) – Ethel Simmons
- The Perfect Sap (1927) – Ruth Webster
- Driven from Home (1927)
- Play Safe (1927) – Virginia Craig
- No Place to Go (1927) – Virginia Dare
- The Head of the Family (1928) – Alice Sullivan
- Bare Knees (1928) – Billie Durey
- The Little Snob (1928) – Jane
- Jazzland (1928) – Martha Baggott
- Footlights and Fools (1929) – Claire Floyd
- Knee High (1929)
- Morals for Women (1931) – Maybelle
- Shotgun Pass (1931) – Sally Seagrue
- Forgotten Women (1931) – Sissy Salem
- X Marks the Spot (1931) – Hortense
- Letter of Introduction (1938) – Woman at Barry's Party (uncredited)
- Adventure in Diamonds (1940) – Nightclub Woman (uncredited) (final film role)
