= Carnival Boat =

1932 film directed by Albert S. Rogell

- Theatrical release poster
- Directed by: Albert S. Rogell
- Screenplay by: James Seymour
- Story by: Marion Jackson; Don Ryan
- Produced by: Charles R. Rogers; Harry Joe Brown (associate)
- Starring: William Boyd; Ginger Rogers; Fred Kohler; Hobart Bosworth
- Cinematography: Ted D. McCord
- Edited by: John F. Link Sr.
- Music by: Max Steiner
- Production company: RKO Pictures
- Distributed by: RKO Pictures
- Release date: March 19, 1932
- Running time: 62 minutes
- Country: United States
- Language: English

Carnival Boat is a 1932 American Pre-Code adventure film directed by Albert S. Rogell and written by James Seymour. The film stars William Boyd, Ginger Rogers, Fred Kohler, and Hobart Bosworth. The film was released on March 21, 1932, by RKO Pictures.

== Plot ==
With production down and his health failing, Jim Gannon has only one logging season to groom his son Buck to replace him as the logging camp boss. However, Buck is more interested in courting Honey, a singer and dancer on a carnival boat that travels from camp to camp. Against orders from his father, he takes his crew to the boat where he proposes to Honey and promises her that he will quit his job and move to the city. Meanwhile, head loader Hack Logan wants to be promoted to boss after Jim retires.

After Jim is injured in an accident, Buck is too busy with work to see Honey and she begins to doubt their relationship. When she visits Jim, he convinces Honey that Buck wants to continue logging. Before Honey can leave town, the river is blocked by a massive log jam that threatens to destroy the dam. Buck risks his life to dynamite the key logs in the log jam and get the river flowing again. Hack tries to strand Buck next to the dynamite when it explodes, but Buck escapes unharmed and ends up rescuing Hack when he is trapped between two logs. With his treachery exposed, Hack is out of the running for boss logger. Honey has missed the carnival boat and decides to stay in the camp and marry Buck.

== Cast ==
- William Boyd as Buck Gannon
- Ginger Rogers as Honey
- Fred Kohler as Hack Logan
- Hobart Bosworth as Jim Gannon
- Marie Prevost as Babe
- Edgar Kennedy as Baldy
- Harry Sweet as Stubby
- Charles Sellon as Lane
- Eddy Chandler as Jordon

== Production ==
The film was shot on a budget of $217,000. Some scenes were filmed on Stages 10 and 12 at RKO 40 Acres in Culver City, California while others were shot on location in the Sierra Nevada. Ginger Rogers' wardrobe was designed by Gwen Wakeling.

== Music ==
- "How I Could Go for You" - Bernie Grossman and Howard Lewis
- "Run Around" - Max Steiner (cut from final film)
