= The Girl from Rio (1927 film) =

1927 film

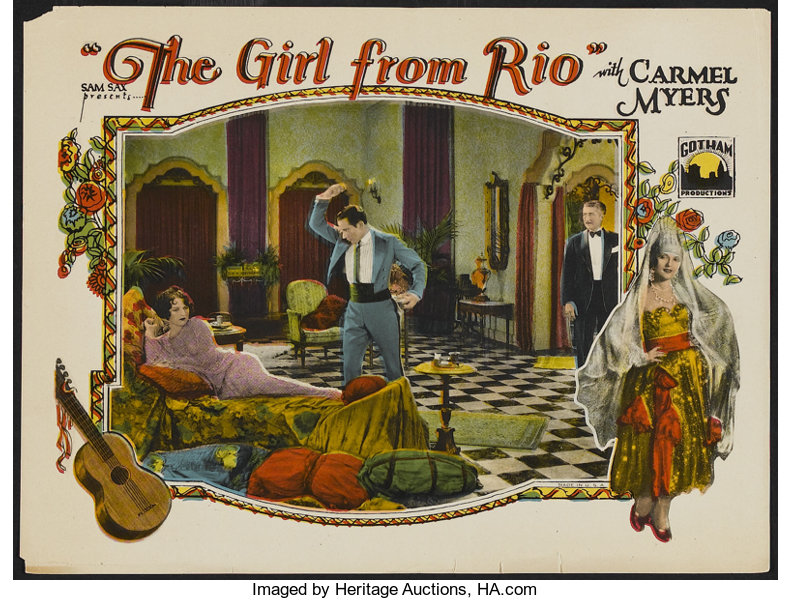
- Lobby card
- Directed by: Tom Terriss
- Written by: Pauline Forney; Norman Kellogg; Tom Terriss
- Produced by: Samuel Sax; Samuel Bischoff
- Starring: Carmel Myers; Walter Pidgeon; Richard Tucker
- Cinematography: Ray June
- Production company: Gotham Productions
- Distributed by: Lumas Film Corporation
- Release date: September 1, 1927
- Running time: 60 minutes
- Country: United States
- Language: Silent (English intertitles)

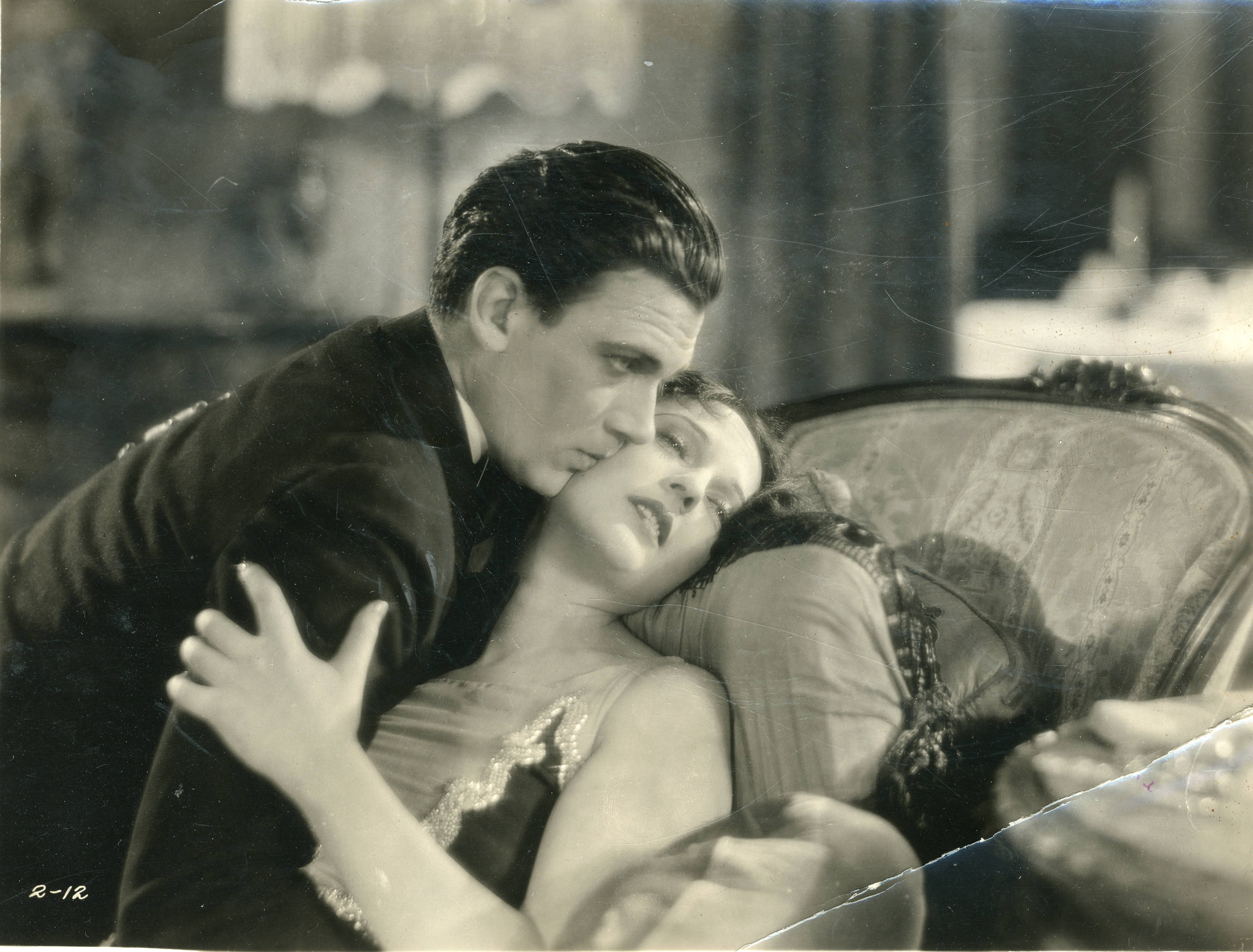
Film still of Carmel Myers and Walter Pidgeon

The Girl from Rio is a 1927 American silent romance film directed by Tom Terriss and starring Carmel Myers, Walter Pidgeon, and Richard Tucker.

== Plot ==
An American coffee purchaser arrives in Rio de Janeiro and falls in love with a local café dancer.

== Cast ==
- Carmel Myers as Lola
- Walter Pidgeon as Paul Sinclair
- Richard Tucker as Antonio Santos
- Henry Hebert as Farael Fuentes
- Mildred Harris as Helen Graham
- Edward Raquello as Raoul the dancer

== Preservation ==
Prints of The Girl from Rio are in the film collections of the Library of Congress, UCLA Film & Television Archive, and Library and Archives Canada.

== Bibliography ==
- Munden, Kenneth White. The American Film Institute Catalog of Motion Pictures Produced in the United States, Part 1. University of California Press, 1997.
