= The Final Extra =

1927 film

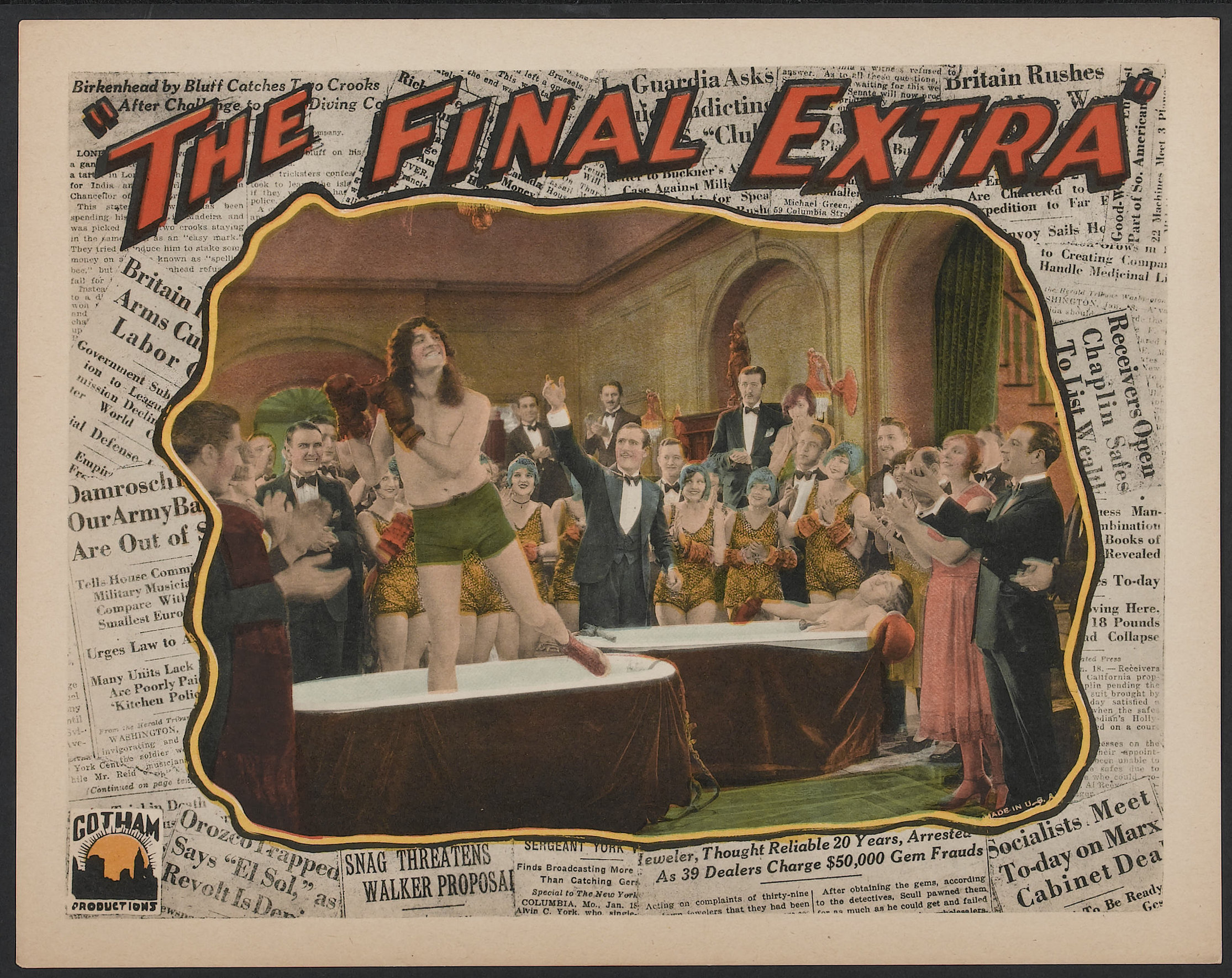
- 1927 lobby card
- Directed by: James P. Hogan
- Written by: Herbert C. Clark; Delos Sutherland
- Produced by: Samuel Sax
- Starring: Marguerite De La Motte; Grant Withers; John Miljan
- Cinematography: Ray June
- Edited by: Edith Wakeling
- Production company: Gotham Productions
- Distributed by: Lumas Film Corporation
- Release date: February 7, 1927
- Running time: 60 minutes
- Country: United States
- Languages: Silent; English intertitles

The Final Extra is a 1927 American silent crime film directed by James P. Hogan and starring Marguerite De La Motte, Grant Withers, and John Miljan. A print of The Final Extra exists.

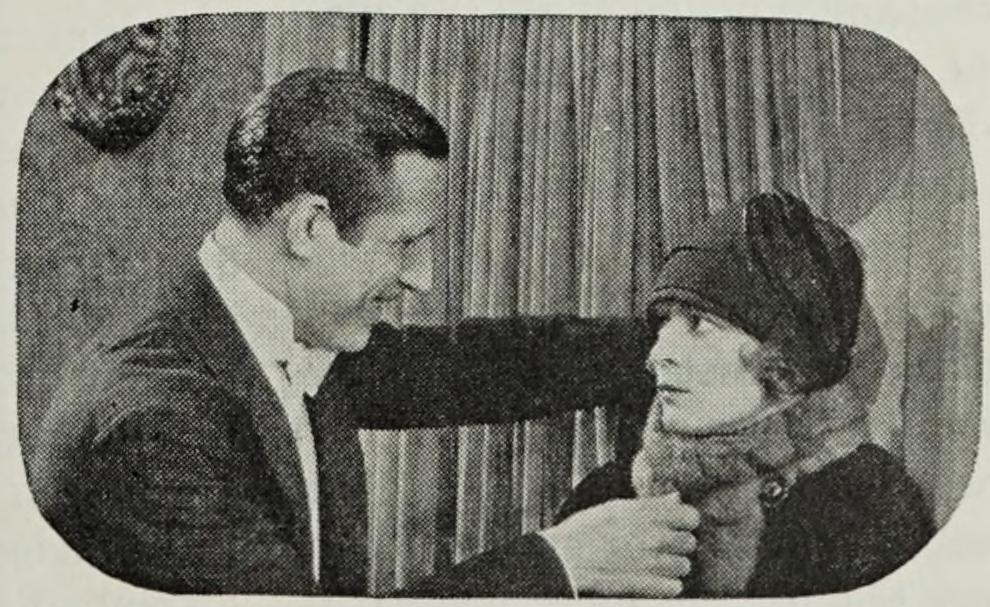
Still with John Miljan and Marguerite De La Motte

== Plot ==
As described in copyright records, Pat Riley, a young college graduate is breaking in on a big newspaper, but is assigned to the "Society" column. He longs to be given "scoop" assignments like star reporter Tom Collins, who is working on a bootlegging ring story. Pat is sent to get a story on a new musical comedy being produced by Mervin Le Roy, who has a questionable reputation. There he runs into Tom's daughter Ruth, who is starting a stage career while taking care of her father and younger brother Buddy. She invites him to a birthday party. At the party, Ruth waits for her father but is met by Pat, who sadly tells her that Tom was killed by bootleggers after they found out about his investigation. Pat vows to get the man responsible and the gang, and asks his editor to be assigned to take over the investigation. He tells Ruth of suspicions that Le Roy is in league with "The Shadow," the head of the bootlegging gang. Ruth is to dance at a house party given by Le Roy, who has designs on her, but the appearance of Pat makes him hesitate. Le Roy bides his time, and, after her big success in the opening night of the gorgeous revue, he approaches Ruth but is interrupted by the appearance of a henchman, who tells Le Roy that someone is watching the gang very closely. Le Roy's men then set a trap that catches Pat after a terrific fight. By a bit of strategy, Pat gets free and calls the newspaper, saying to hold the presses as he is to reveal who "The Shadow" is, and to be ready for a final extra. Le Roy, to secure Ruth, lures her to his home using a fake telephone call about Pat, who enters the theater shortly after Ruth has left. Pat calls the newspaper again and reports that Le Roy is "The Shadow" and gives the address of the gang's headquarters, and asks that they contact the police to send them to the gang's headquarters and Le Roy's country house. Pat arrives at the house first and is just in time to save Ruth from an attack. Pat gives Le Roy a terrible beating just as the police arrive. Members of the gang have squealed, and Pat accuses Le Roy as being responsible for the death of reported Tom Collins. For his scoop, the newspaper gives Pat story credit in the extra. Pat is made the star reporter and as a second reward he obtains the job of being Ruth's husband.

== Cast ==
- Marguerite De La Motte as Ruth Collins
- Grant Withers as Pat Riley
- John Miljan as Mervin Le Roy
- Frank Beal as Tom Collins
- Joseph W. Girard as Editor Williams
- Billy 'Red' Jones as Buddy Collins
- Leon Holmes as The Copyboy

== Bibliography ==
- Munden, Kenneth White. The American Film Institute Catalog of Motion Pictures Produced in the United States, Part 1. University of California Press, 1997.
