= North Star (1925 film) =

1925 film by Paul Powell

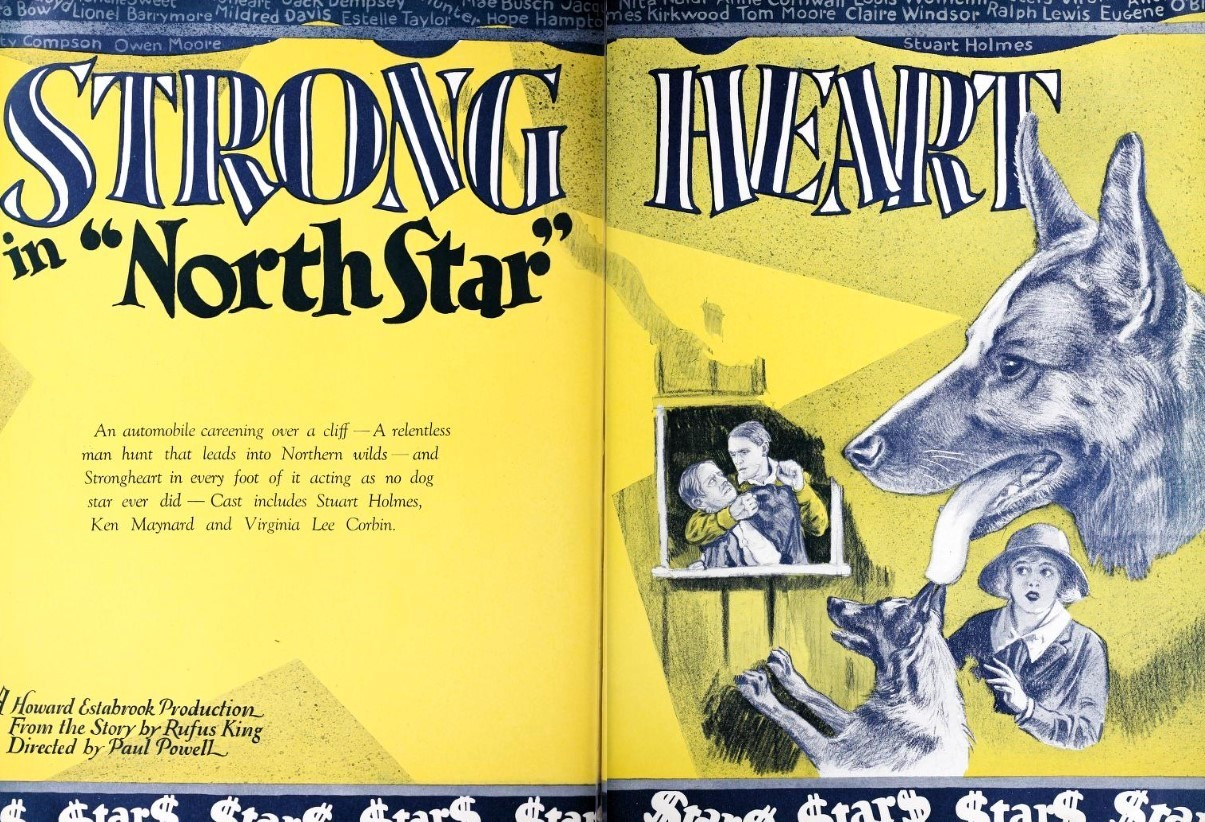
- Trade advertisement
- Directed by: Paul Powell
- Written by: Charles Horan
- Based on: North Star: a Dog Story of the Canadian Northwest; 1925 novel by Rufus King
- Produced by: Howard Estabrook
- Starring: Virginia Lee Corbin; Stuart Holmes; Ken Maynard; Clark Gable
- Cinematography: Joseph Walker
- Production company: Howard Estabrook Productions
- Distributed by: Associated Exhibitors
- Release date: December 27, 1925
- Running time: 50 minutes
- Country: United States
- Language: Silent (English intertitles)

North Star is a 1925 American silent drama film directed by Paul Powell and starring Virginia Lee Corbin, Stuart Holmes, and Ken Maynard. The film was made as a showcase for Strongheart the Dog, a rival of Rin Tin Tin. Future star Clark Gable appears in a supporting role.

== Plot ==
As described in a film magazine review, the friends of Noel Blake, a wealthy young man, contrive a plot by which he is made to believe himself to be a murderer. He flees to the northwest timber country without his two best friends, his dog North Star, or Marcia Gale, the sister of one of his friends. He is followed by Dick Robbins, a man who intends to blackmail him and extort money from him. Marcia and the dog trail the villain close behind. At the end, after a fight between Noel and the blackmailer, the dog pursues the villain to his death over a cliff.

== Cast ==
- Strongheart the Dog as North Star
- Virginia Lee Corbin as Marcia Gale
- Stuart Holmes as Dick Robbins
- Ken Maynard as Noel Blake
- Harold Austin as Wilbur Gale
- Clark Gable as Archie West
- William Riley as Wayne Connor
- Syd Crossley as Tramp
- Jerry Mandy as Tramp
- Martin Faust as Indian
- J.C. Fowler as Dr. Jim Craig

== Bibliography ==
- Munden, Kenneth White. The American Film Institute Catalog of Motion Pictures Produced in the United States, Part 1. University of California Press, 1997.
