= Ray June =

American cinematographer (1895–1958)

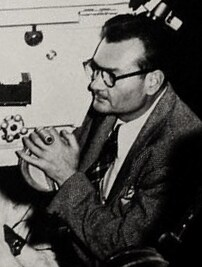
- June filming The Secret Garden (1949)
- Born: March 27, 1895; Ithaca, New York, U.S.
- Died: May 26, 1958 (aged 63); Hollywood, Los Angeles, California, U.S.
- Occupation: Cinematographer
- Years active: 1915–1958

Ray June, A.S.C. (March 27, 1895 – May 26, 1958) was an American cinematographer during the early and classical Hollywood cinema. His best-known films are Babes in Arms and Funny Face. June attended Columbia University but did not graduate. His experience as a cameraman in the U.S. Army Signal Corps during World War I was instrumental to his success in Hollywood.

== Partial filmography ==
- The New Adventures of J. Rufus Wallingford (1915 short)
- Patria (1917)
- The Great White Trail (1917)
- The Eagle's Eye (1918)
- Bits of Life (1921)
- If Women Only Knew (1921)
- Racing Luck (1924)
- By Divine Right (1924)
- Missing Daughters (1924)
- The Shadow on the Wall (1925)
- One of the Bravest (1925)
- The Golden Web (1926)
- The Phantom of the Forest (1926)
- The Silent Power (1926)
- Racing Blood (1926)
- King of the Pack (1926)
- The Sign of the Claw (1926)
- Heroes of the Night (1927)
- Through Thick and Thin (1927)
- The Girl from Rio (1927)
- The Silent Avenger (1927)
- Quarantined Rivals (1927)
- The Woman Who Did Not Care (1927)
- The Opening Night (1927)
- The Final Extra (1927)
- Mountains of Manhattan (1927)
- Sinews of Steel (1927)
- So This Is Love? (1928)
- United States Smith (1928)
- The Sporting Age (1928)
- A Woman's Way (1928)
- Alibi (1929)
- Times Square (1929)
- The Locked Door (1929)
- Puttin' On the Ritz (1930)
- The Eyes of the World (1930)
- The Lottery Bride (1930)
- The Bat Whispers (1930)
- Reaching for the Moon (1930)
- Arrowsmith (1931)
- Corsair (1931)
- Bought! (1931)
- Indiscreet (1931)
- Horse Feathers (1932)
- Disorderly Conduct (1932)
- Roman Scandals (1933)
- I Cover the Waterfront (1933)
- Secrets (1933)
- Treasure Island (1934)
- Barbary Coast (1935)
- China Seas (1935)
- Born to Dance (1936)
- The Great Ziegfeld (1936) (sequence)
- Riffraff (1936)
- Broadway Melody of 1938 (1937) (uncredited)
- Saratoga (1937)
- Night Must Fall (1937)
- Test Pilot (1938)
- Rich Man, Poor Girl (1938)
- Babes in Arms (1939)
- Joy Scouts (1939 short)
- Lucky Night (1939)
- Fast and Furious (1939)
- Strike Up the Band (1940)
- H.M. Pulham, Esq. (1941)
- Ziegfeld Girl (1941)
- I Married an Angel (1942)
- Ziegfeld Follies (1945) (uncredited)
- The Hoodlum Saint (1946)
- The Beginning or the End (1947)
- A Southern Yankee (1948)
- The Bride Goes Wild (1948)
- The Sun Comes Up (1949)
- Mrs. O'Malley and Mr. Malone (1950)
- Crisis (1950)
- Shadow on the Wall (1950)
- It's a Big Country (1951)
- Callaway Went Thataway (1951)
- Day of Triumph (1954)
- The Court Jester (1956)
- The Seventh Sin (1957)
- Funny Face (1957)
- Gigi (1958) (uncredited)
- Houseboat (1958)

== Awards ==
June was nominated for three Academy Award for Best Cinematography:

- 1931 for Arrowsmith
- 1935 for Barbary Coast
- 1957 for Funny Face
