= The Pace That Kills (1928 film) =

1928 film

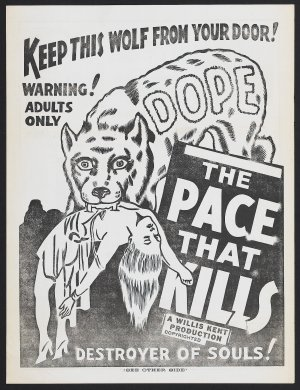
- Theatrical poster (1928)
- Directed by: Norton S. Parker; William A. O'Connor (credited as Wm. A. O'Connor)
- Produced by: Willis Kent
- Starring: Owen Gorin; Thelma Daniels; Florence Turner; Florence Dudley
- Narrated by: Willis Kent (credited as presenter)
- Cinematography: Ernest Laszlo
- Edited by: Edith Wakeling
- Production company: Willis Kent Productions
- Distributed by: "State Rights"
- Release date: December 7, 1928
- Running time: 64 minutes
- Country: United States
- Language: English

The Pace That Kills is a 1928 American silent exploitation film directed by Norton S. Parker and William O'Connor. The film tells the story of two young people who get involved with a drug dealer and become addicted to opium and cocaine. The plot also dealt with amorality and prostitution. Similar to other movies of the genre, the final film was redone as a film of the same name in 1935 in a sound or "talkie" film format. Footage from The Pace That Kills was incorporated in the later film.

== Plot ==
Eddie Bradley (Owen Gorin), a young farmboy leaves for the big city to get a job and find his sister, Grace (Florence Dudley). Eddie finds work in a department store and meets Fanny O'Rell (Virginia Roye), a city girl who introduces him to narcotics, and he falls into the clutches of drug dealers.

Now an addict, Eddie loses his job. He finally finds Grace but she has also become an addict and a prostitute to pay for his habit.

Both of them get involved with drug dealers and become opium/cocaine addicts, financially dependent on their dealers and in need. Grace is jailed and Eddie is hospitalized, where, after months of agony, he is cured of his habit and allowed to return home to his family and his childhood sweetheart (Thelma Daniels).

== Cast ==
- Owen Gorin as Eddie Bradley
- Thelma Daniels as Mary Jane, Eddie's Sweetheart
- Florence Turner as Mrs. Bradley
- Florence Dudley as Grace Bradley
- Harry Todd as Uncle Caleb
- Arnold Dallas as "Handsome Nick"
- Virginia Roye as Fanny O'Reilly

== Production ==
The Pace That Kills was typical of the other films that Willis Kent produced during the 1920s, 1930s and 1940s that were a string of low-budget westerns and exploitation films, thinly disguised as cautionary tales.

== Reception ==
The Pace That Kills was released and distributed via "State Rights", where local sales agents would then sell rights to individual theaters. The theater operators could play the film as often as they desired in an attempt to make as much profit as possible. The film was redone in 1935 as a sound film with the same title, and then re-issued in 1937 as The Cocaine Fiends.

=== Preservation status ===
A print of The Pace That Kills is preserved in the Library of Congress collection.
