= Quarantined Rivals =

1927 film

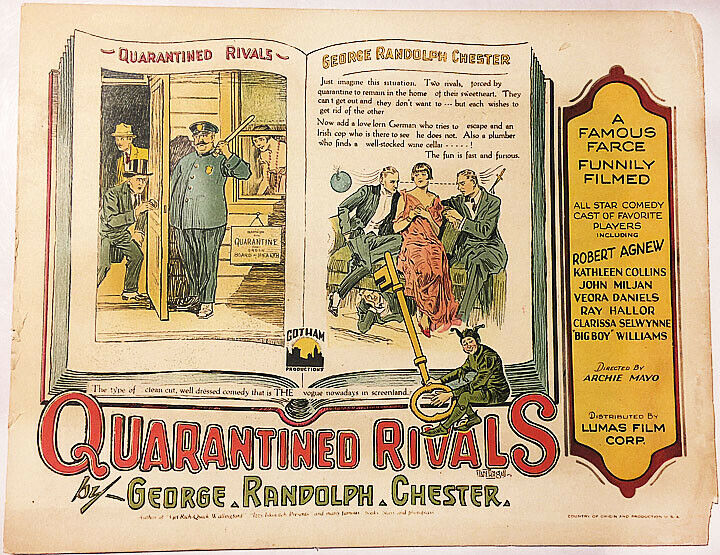
- Directed by: Archie Mayo
- Written by: Al Boasberg
- Based on: Quarantined Rivals by George Randolph Chester
- Produced by: Samuel Sax
- Starring: Robert Agnew; Kathleen Collins; John Miljan
- Cinematography: Ray June
- Edited by: Edith Wakeling
- Production company: Gotham Pictures
- Distributed by: Lumas Film Corporation; Gaumont British Distributors (UK)
- Release date: February 28, 1927
- Running time: 70 minutes
- Country: United States
- Languages: Silent; English intertitles

Quarantined Rivals is a 1927 American silent romantic comedy film directed by Archie Mayo and starring Robert Agnew, Kathleen Collins and John Miljan. It was produced by the independent studio Gotham Pictures. It was based on a 1906 short story of the same title by George Randolph Chester.

== Synopsis ==
The plot revolves around Bruce Farney (a football player) and his attempts to woo Elsie Peyton in the face of competition from a rival, as well as becoming mixed up with an attractive manicurist Minette. Complications ensue when both Bruce and his rival are forced to quarantine together due to smallpox.

== Cast ==
- Robert Agnew as Bruce Farney
- Kathleen Collins as Elsie Peyton
- John Miljan as Ed, the barber
- Ray Hallor as Robert Howard
- Viora Daniel as Minette, the manicurist
- Guinn 'Big Boy' Williams as Joe, the plumber
- Clarissa Selwynne as Mrs. Peyton
- George C. Pearce as Mr. Peyton
- William A. O'Connor as Mort
- Josephine Borio as Maid

== Bibliography ==
- Connelly, Robert B. The Silents: Silent Feature Films, 1910-36, Volume 40, Issue 2. December Press, 1998.
- Munden, Kenneth White. The American Film Institute Catalog of Motion Pictures Produced in the United States, Part 1. University of California Press, 1997.
