= Billy the Kid (film series) =

Billy the Kid / Billy Carson film series
- Created by: Producers Releasing Corporation (PRC)
- Original work: United States
- Years: 1940–1946

Films and television
- Film(s): 42

The Billy the Kid series of 42 Western films was produced between 1940 and 1946, and released by Poverty Row studio Producers Releasing Corporation.

The initial six star Bob Steele as Billy the Kid who left PRC to return to Republic Pictures. The next thirteen star Buster Crabbe as Billy the Kid, and the following 23 feature Crabbe as the same character, renamed "Billy Carson". All 42 films in the series are directed by Sam Newfield, "America's most prolific sound film director", sometimes under pseudonyms. All films feature Al St. John as Billy's sidekick "Fuzzy" Jones; St. John also played the same character as the sidekick in the Lone Rider series from 1941–1943. Carleton Young also played Billy's friend Jeff Travis in the first five movies.

The films were shot in 10 or 12 days each, with an average cost of $25,000 a film.

== Bob Steele as Billy the Kid ==
- Billy the Kid Outlawed (1940)
- Billy the Kid in Texas (1940)
- Billy the Kid's Gun Justice (1940)
- Billy the Kid's Range War (1941)
- Billy the Kid's Fighting Pals (1941)
- Billy the Kid in Santa Fe (1941)

== Buster Crabbe as Billy the Kid ==
- Billy the Kid Wanted (1941)
- Billy the Kid's Round-Up (1941)
- Billy the Kid Trapped (1942)
- Billy the Kid's Smoking Guns (1942)
- Law and Order (1942)
- Sheriff of Sage Valley (1942)
- The Mysterious Rider (1942)
- The Kid Rides Again (1943)
- Fugitive of the Plains (1943)
- Western Cyclone (1943)
- Cattle Stampede (1943)
- The Renegade (1943)
- Blazing Frontier (1943)

== Buster Crabbe as Billy Carson ==
- Devil Riders (1943)
- Frontier Outlaws (1944)
- Valley of Vengeance (1944)
- The Drifter (1944)
- Fuzzy Settles Down (1944)
- Rustlers' Hideout (1944)
- Wild Horse Phantom (1944)
- Oath of Vengeance (1944)
- His Brother's Ghost (1945)
- Thundering Gunslingers (1945)
- Shadows of Death (1945)
- Gangster's Den (1945)
- Stagecoach Outlaws (1945)
- Border Badmen (1945)
- Fighting Bill Carson (1945)
- Prairie Rustlers (1945)
- Lightning Raiders (1945)
- Terrors on Horseback (1946)
- Gentlemen with Guns (1946)
- Ghost of Hidden Valley (1946)
- Prairie Badmen (1946)
- Overland Riders (1946)
- Outlaws of the Plains (1946)
