= Fugitive of the Plains =

1943 film by Sam Newfield

- Re-release film poster
- Directed by: Sam Newfield
- Written by: George Wallace Sayre (original screenplay)
- Produced by: Sigmund Neufeld (producer)
- Starring: See below
- Cinematography: Jack Greenhalgh
- Edited by: Holbrook N. Todd
- Music by: Leo Erdody
- Release date: April 1, 1943
- Running time: 56 minutes (original version); 50 minutes (US); 38 minutes (edited version) (re-release)
- Country: United States
- Language: English

Fugitive of the Plains is a 1943 American Producers Releasing Corporation Western film of the "Billy the Kid" series directed by Sam Newfield. In April 1947 PRC re-released the film as a "streamlined" (edited) "Bronco Buckaroo" version titled Raiders of Red Rock.

== Plot summary ==
Billy and his sidekick Fuzzy get word that crimes are being conducted in his name near Red Rock County. Investigating the situation hoping to clear his name, he discovers a gang headed by pretty Kate Shelly. Though they know him, he pretends to join the gang to smash it from the inside.

== Cast ==
- Buster Crabbe as Billy the Kid
- Al St. John as Fuzzy Jones
- Maxine Leslie as Kate Shelly
- Jack Ingram as Henchman Dillon
- Kermit Maynard as Henchman Spence
- Karl Hackett as Red Rock Sheriff Sam Packard
- Hal Price as Willow Springs Sheriff Dave Connelly
- George Chesebro as Henchman Baxter
- Frank Ellis as Henchman Dirk
- John Merton as Deputy arresting Fuzzy

== See also ==
The "Billy the Kid" films starring Buster Crabbe:

- Billy the Kid Wanted (1941)
- Billy the Kid's Round-Up (1941)
- Billy the Kid Trapped (1942)
- Billy the Kid's Smoking Guns (1942)
- Law and Order (1942)
- Sheriff of Sage Valley (1942)
- The Mysterious Rider (1942)
- The Kid Rides Again (1943)
- Fugitive of the Plains (1943)
- Western Cyclone (1943)
- Cattle Stampede (1943)
- The Renegade (1943)
- Blazing Frontier (1943)
- Devil Riders (1943)
- Frontier Outlaws (1944)
- Valley of Vengeance (1944)
- The Drifter (1944)
- Fuzzy Settles Down (1944)
- Rustlers' Hideout (1944)
- Wild Horse Phantom (1944)
- Oath of Vengeance (1944)
- His Brother's Ghost (1945)
- Thundering Gunslingers (1945)
- Shadows of Death (1945)
- Gangster's Den (1945)
- Stagecoach Outlaws (1945)
- Border Badmen (1945)
- Fighting Bill Carson (1945)
- Prairie Rustlers (1945)
- Lightning Raiders (1945)
- Terrors on Horseback (1946)
- Gentlemen with Guns (1946)
- Ghost of Hidden Valley (1946)
- Prairie Badmen (1946)
- Overland Riders (1946)
- Outlaws of the Plains (1946)
