= Billy the Kid's Smoking Guns =

1942 film by Sam Newfield

- Theatrical release poster
- Directed by: Sam Newfield
- Screenplay by: Milton Raison
- Produced by: Sigmund Neufeld
- Starring: Buster Crabbe, Al St. John, Dave O'Brien, John Merton, Milton Kibbee, Ted Adams
- Cinematography: Jack Greenhalgh
- Edited by: Holbrook N. Todd
- Production company: Sigmund Neufeld Productions
- Distributed by: Producers Releasing Corporation
- Release date: May 1, 1942
- Running time: 58 minutes
- Country: United States
- Language: English

Billy the Kid's Smoking Guns is a 1942 American Western film directed by Sam Newfield and written by Milton Raison and George Wallace Sayre. The film stars Buster Crabbe, Al St. John, Dave O'Brien, John Merton, Milton Kibbee and Ted Adams. The film was released on May 1, 1942, by Producers Releasing Corporation.

== Cast ==
- Buster Crabbe as Billy the Kid
- Al St. John as Fuzzy Jones
- Dave O'Brien as Jeff Travis
- John Merton as Morgan
- Milton Kibbee as Dr. Hagen
- Ted Adams as Sheriff Carson
- Karl Hackett as Hart
- Frank Ellis as Carter
- Slim Whitaker as Roberts
- Budd Buster as Rancher
- Joel Newfield as Dickie Howard
- Joan Barclay as Mrs. Howard

== See also ==
The Billy the Kid films starring Buster Crabbe:

- Billy the Kid Wanted (1941)
- Billy the Kid's Round-Up (1941)
- Billy the Kid Trapped (1942)
- Billy the Kid's Smoking Guns (1942)
- Law and Order (1942)
- Sheriff of Sage Valley (1942)
- The Mysterious Rider (1942)
- The Kid Rides Again (1943)
- Fugitive of the Plains (1943)
- Western Cyclone (1943)
- Cattle Stampede (1943)
- The Renegade (1943)
- Blazing Frontier (1943)
- Devil Riders (1943)
- Frontier Outlaws (1944)
- Valley of Vengeance (1944)
- The Drifter (1944)
- Fuzzy Settles Down (1944)
- Rustlers' Hideout (1944)
- Wild Horse Phantom (1944)
- Oath of Vengeance (1944)
- His Brother's Ghost (1945)
- Thundering Gunslingers (1945)
- Shadows of Death (1945)
- Gangster's Den (1945)
- Stagecoach Outlaws (1945)
- Border Badmen (1945)
- Fighting Bill Carson (1945)
- Prairie Rustlers (1945)
- Lightning Raiders (1945)
- Terrors on Horseback (1946)
- Gentlemen with Guns (1946)
- Ghost of Hidden Valley (1946)
- Prairie Badmen (1946)
- Overland Riders (1946)
- Outlaws of the Plains (1946)
