= Gangster's Den =

1945 film by Sam Newfield

- Theatrical release poster
- Directed by: Sam Newfield
- Written by: George H. Plympton (original story); George H. Plympton (screenplay)
- Produced by: Sigmund Neufeld (producer)
- Starring: See below
- Cinematography: Jack Greenhalgh
- Edited by: Holbrook N. Todd
- Distributed by: Producers Releasing Corporation
- Release date: 1945
- Running time: 55 minutes
- Country: United States
- Language: English

Gangster's Den is a 1945 American Producers Releasing Corporation Western film of the "Billy the Kid" series directed by Sam Newfield. The film is notable for having three comedy relief characters; Al St. John, Emmett Lynn, and Charles King, who usually plays the villain.

== Plot ==
Fuzzy (Al St. John) is upset that the ranch hands spend their time and money at a saloon where they lose their money drinking and gambling. Fuzzy decides to buy the saloon to keep an eye on the men and moderate their vices, but a shifty lawyer has other ideas and plans to use murder to get his way.

== Cast ==
- Buster Crabbe as Billy Carson
- Al St. John as Fuzzy Jones
- Sydney Logan as Ruth Lane
- Charles King as Butch
- Emmett Lynn as Webb aka Webfoot
- Kermit Maynard as Henchman Curt
- Ed Cassidy as Sheriff
- I. Stanford Jolley as Lawyer Horace Black
- George Chesebro as Dent, Black Henchman
- Karl Hackett as Old Man Taylor, Bar Owner
- Michael Owen as Jimmy Lane, Ruth's Brother

== See also ==
The "Billy the Kid" films starring Buster Crabbe:

- Billy the Kid Wanted (1941)
- Billy the Kid's Round-Up (1941)
- Billy the Kid Trapped (1942)
- Billy the Kid's Smoking Guns (1942)
- Law and Order (1942)
- Sheriff of Sage Valley (1942)
- The Mysterious Rider (1942)
- The Kid Rides Again (1943)
- Fugitive of the Plains (1943)
- Western Cyclone (1943)
- Cattle Stampede (1943)
- The Renegade (1943)
- Blazing Frontier (1943)
- Devil Riders (1943)
- Frontier Outlaws (1944)
- Valley of Vengeance (1944)
- The Drifter (1944)
- Fuzzy Settles Down (1944)
- Rustlers' Hideout (1944)
- Wild Horse Phantom (1944)
- Oath of Vengeance (1944)
- His Brother's Ghost (1945)
- Thundering Gun Slingers (1945)
- Shadows of Death (1945)
- Gangster's Den (1945)
- Stagecoach Outlaws (1945)
- Border Badmen (1945)
- Fighting Bill Carson (1945)
- Prairie Rustlers (1945)
- Lightning Raiders (1945)
- Terrors on Horseback (1946)
- Gentlemen with Guns (1946)
- Ghost of Hidden Valley (1946)
- Prairie Badmen (1946)
- Overland Riders (1946)
- Outlaws of the Plains (1946)
