= Wild Horse Phantom =

1944 film by Sam Newfield

- Theatrical release poster
- Directed by: Sam Newfield
- Written by: George Wallace Sayre (original story and screenplay) and Milton Raison (original story and screenplay)
- Produced by: Sigmund Neufeld (producer)
- Starring: See below
- Cinematography: Jack Greenhalgh
- Edited by: Holbrook N. Todd
- Release date: October 28, 1944
- Running time: 56 minutes
- Country: United States
- Language: English

Wild Horse Phantom is a 1944 American Producers Releasing Corporation Western film of the "Billy the Kid" series directed by Sam Newfield.

== Plot ==
The film begins with a breakout of five inmates from a modern day prison. Watching the escape with the warden is Billy Carson who has engineered the break. Carson has the idea that he will trail the leader of the escapees, Link Daggett in order to recover the missing money from a bank robbery. The robbery caused an entire community to lose their savings and face financial ruin. Carson and Fuzzy trail Daggett's gang to the Wild Horse Mine where Daggett may have hidden the loot. Inside the mine Daggett can not find the money. Billy and Fuzzy have to face not only the gang, but a maniac acting like a ghost as well as a giant bat that had featured in PRC's The Devil Bat.

== Cast ==
- Buster Crabbe as Billy Carson
- Falcon as Billy's Horse
- Al St. John as Fuzzy Q. Jones
- Janet Warren as Marian Garnet
- Kermit Maynard as Link Daggett, Gang Leader
- Budd Buster as Ed Garnet
- Hal Price as Clipp Walters
- Robert Meredith as Tom Hanlon
- Frank Ellis as Henchman Kallen
- Frank McCarroll as Henchman Moffett
- John L. Cason as Henchman Lucas
- John Elliott as Prison Warden

== See also ==
The "Billy the Kid" films starring Buster Crabbe:

- Billy the Kid Wanted (1941)
- Billy the Kid's Round-Up (1941)
- Billy the Kid Trapped (1942)
- Billy the Kid's Smoking Guns (1942)
- Law and Order (1942)
- Sheriff of Sage Valley (1942)
- The Mysterious Rider (1942)
- The Kid Rides Again (1943)
- Fugitive of the Plains (1943)
- Western Cyclone (1943)
- Cattle Stampede (1943)
- The Renegade (1943)
- Blazing Frontier (1943)
- Devil Riders (1943)
- Frontier Outlaws (1944)
- Valley of Vengeance (1944)
- The Drifter (1944)
- Fuzzy Settles Down (1944)
- Rustlers' Hideout (1944)
- Wild Horse Phantom (1944)
- Oath of Vengeance (1944)
- His Brother's Ghost (1945)
- Thundering Gunslingers (1945)
- Shadows of Death (1945)
- Gangster's Den (1945)
- Stagecoach Outlaws (1945)
- Border Badmen (1945)
- Fighting Bill Carson (1945)
- Prairie Rustlers (1945)
- Lightning Raiders (1945)
- Terrors on Horseback (1946)
- Gentlemen with Guns (1946)
- Ghost of Hidden Valley (1946)
- Prairie Badmen (1946)
- Overland Riders (1946)
- Outlaws of the Plains (1946)
