= Billy the Kid Wanted =

1941 film

- Lobby card
- Directed by: Sam Newfield
- Written by: Fred Myton
- Produced by: Sigmund Neufeld
- Starring: Buster Crabbe; Al St. John; Glenn Strange
- Cinematography: Jack Greenhalgh
- Edited by: Holbrook N. Todd
- Production company: Sigmund Neufeld Productions
- Distributed by: Producers Releasing Corporation
- Release date: October 4, 1941
- Running time: 63 minutes
- Country: United States
- Language: English

Billy the Kid Wanted is a 1941 American Western film directed by Sam Newfield. This film is the seventh in the "Billy the Kid" film series produced by PRC from 1940 to 1946, and the first starring Buster Crabbe as Billy the Kid, replacing Bob Steele. The film also features Sam Newfield's son Joel.

== Plot ==
Tired of always running from the law, Fuzzy leaves his pals Billy and Jeff and heads to Paradise Valley to be a homesteader. However, when he finds himself in trouble and is arrested he sends for them. They find the source of Fuzzy's trouble, Matt Brawley, who controls the town and is running a land swindle.

== Cast ==
- Buster Crabbe as Billy the Kid
- Al St. John as Fuzzy
- Dave O'Brien as Jeff
- Glenn Strange as Matt Brawley
- Charles King as Jack Saunders
- Slim Whitaker as 2nd Sheriff
- Howard Masters as Stan Harper
- Choti Sherwood as Jane Harper
- Joel Newfield as Joey Harper
- Budd Buster as Storekeeper
- Frank Ellis as Bart - Henchman

== See also ==
The "Billy the Kid" films starring Buster Crabbe:

- Billy the Kid Wanted (1941)
- Billy the Kid's Round-Up (1941)
- Billy the Kid Trapped (1942)
- Billy the Kid's Smoking Guns (1942)
- Law and Order (1942)
- Sheriff of Sage Valley (1942)
- The Mysterious Rider (1942)
- The Kid Rides Again (1943)
- Fugitive of the Plains (1943)
- Western Cyclone (1943)
- Cattle Stampede (1943)
- The Renegade (1943)
- Blazing Frontier (1943)
- Devil Riders (1943)
- Frontier Outlaws (1944)
- Valley of Vengeance (1944)
- The Drifter (1944)
- Fuzzy Settles Down (1944)
- Rustlers' Hideout (1944)
- Wild Horse Phantom (1944)
- Oath of Vengeance (1944)
- His Brother's Ghost (1945)
- Thundering Gunslingers (1945)
- Shadows of Death (1945)
- Gangster's Den (1945)
- Stagecoach Outlaws (1945)
- Border Badmen (1945)
- Fighting Bill Carson (1945)
- Prairie Rustlers (1945)
- Lightning Raiders (1945)
- Terrors on Horseback (1946)
- Gentlemen with Guns (1946)
- Ghost of Hidden Valley (1946)
- Prairie Badmen (1946)
- Overland Riders (1946)
- Outlaws of the Plains (1946)
