= Valley of Vengeance =

1944 film by Sam Newfield

- Theatrical release poster
- Directed by: Sam Newfield
- Screenplay by: Joseph O'Donnell
- Produced by: Sigmund Neufeld
- Starring: Buster Crabbe; Al St. John; Evelyn Finley; Donald Mayo; David Polonsky; Glenn Strange
- Cinematography: Jack Greenhalgh
- Edited by: Holbrook N. Todd
- Production company: Sigmund Neufeld Productions
- Distributed by: Producers Releasing Corporation
- Release date: May 5, 1944
- Running time: 56 minutes
- Country: United States
- Language: English

Valley of Vengeance is a 1944 American Western film directed by Sam Newfield and written by Joseph O'Donnell. The film stars Buster Crabbe, Al St. John, Evelyn Finley, Donald Mayo, David Polonsky and Glenn Strange. The film was released on May 5, 1944, by Producers Releasing Corporation.

== Cast ==
- Buster Crabbe as Billy Carson
- Al St. John as Fuzzy Jones
- Evelyn Finley as Helen Miller
- Donald Mayo as Billy
- David Polonsky as Fuzzy
- Glenn Strange as Marshal Barker
- Charles King as Burke
- John Merton as Burt
- Lynton Brent as David Carr
- Jack Ingram as King Brett
- Bud Osborne as Dad Carson
- Nora Bush as Mom Carson
- Steve Clark as Hap

== See also ==
The "Billy the Kid" films starring Buster Crabbe:

- Billy the Kid Wanted (1941)
- Billy the Kid's Round-Up (1941)
- Billy the Kid Trapped (1942)
- Billy the Kid's Smoking Guns (1942)
- Law and Order (1942)
- Sheriff of Sage Valley (1942)
- The Mysterious Rider (1942)
- The Kid Rides Again (1943)
- Fugitive of the Plains (1943)
- Western Cyclone (1943)
- Cattle Stampede (1943)
- The Renegade (1943)
- Blazing Frontier (1943)
- Devil Riders (1943)
- Frontier Outlaws (1944)
- Valley of Vengeance (1944)
- The Drifter (1944)
- Fuzzy Settles Down (1944)
- Rustlers' Hideout (1944)
- Wild Horse Phantom (1944)
- Oath of Vengeance (1944)
- His Brother's Ghost (1945)
- Thundering Gunslingers (1945)
- Shadows of Death (1945)
- Gangster's Den (1945)
- Stagecoach Outlaws (1945)
- Border Badmen (1945)
- Fighting Bill Carson (1945)
- Prairie Rustlers (1945)
- Lightning Raiders (1945)
- Terrors on Horseback (1946)
- Gentlemen with Guns (1946)
- Ghost of Hidden Valley (1946)
- Prairie Badmen (1946)
- Overland Riders (1946)
- Outlaws of the Plains (1946)
