= Terrors on Horseback =

1946 film by Sam Newfield

- Theatrical release poster
- Directed by: Sam Newfield
- Screenplay by: Milton Raison
- Produced by: Sigmund Neufeld
- Starring: Buster Crabbe; Al St. John; Patti McCarty; I. Stanford Jolley; Kermit Maynard; Henry Hall
- Cinematography: Jack Greenhalgh
- Edited by: Holbrook N. Todd
- Production company: Sigmund Neufeld Productions
- Distributed by: Producers Releasing Corporation
- Release date: May 1, 1946
- Running time: 55 minutes
- Country: United States
- Language: English

Terrors on Horseback is a 1946 American Western film directed by Sam Newfield and written by Milton Raison. The film stars Buster Crabbe, Al St. John, Patti McCarty, I. Stanford Jolley, Kermit Maynard and Henry Hall. The film was released on May 1, 1946, by Producers Releasing Corporation.

== Cast ==
- Buster Crabbe as Billy Carson
- Al St. John as Fuzzy Q. Jones
- Patti McCarty as Roxie
- I. Stanford Jolley as Grant Barlow
- Kermit Maynard as Wagner
- Henry Hall as Doc Jones
- Karl Hackett as Ed Sperling
- Marin Sais as Mrs. Bartlett
- Budd Buster as Sheriff Jed Bartlett
- Steve Darrell as Jim Austin
- Steve Clark as Cliff Adams

== See also ==
The "Billy the Kid" films starring Buster Crabbe:

- Billy the Kid Wanted (1941)
- Billy the Kid's Round-Up (1941)
- Billy the Kid Trapped (1942)
- Billy the Kid's Smoking Guns (1942)
- Law and Order (1942)
- Sheriff of Sage Valley (1942)
- The Mysterious Rider (1942)
- The Kid Rides Again (1943)
- Fugitive of the Plains (1943)
- Western Cyclone (1943)
- Cattle Stampede (1943)
- The Renegade (1943)
- Blazing Frontier (1943)
- Devil Riders (1943)
- Frontier Outlaws (1944)
- Valley of Vengeance (1944)
- The Drifter (1944)
- Fuzzy Settles Down (1944)
- Rustlers' Hideout (1944)
- Wild Horse Phantom (1944)
- Oath of Vengeance (1944)
- His Brother's Ghost (1945)
- Thundering Gunslingers (1945)
- Shadows of Death (1945)
- Gangster's Den (1945)
- Stagecoach Outlaws (1945)
- Border Badmen (1945)
- Fighting Bill Carson (1945)
- Prairie Rustlers (1945)
- Lightning Raiders (1945)
- Terrors on Horseback (1946)
- Gentlemen with Guns (1946)
- Ghost of Hidden Valley (1946)
- Prairie Badmen (1946)
- Overland Riders (1946)
- Outlaws of the Plains (1946)
