= Billy the Kid's Round-Up =

1941 film by Sam Newfield

- Theatrical release poster
- Directed by: Sam Newfield
- Screenplay by: Fred Myton
- Produced by: Sigmund Neufeld
- Starring: Buster Crabbe; Al St. John; Carleton Young; Joan Barclay; Glenn Strange; Charles King
- Cinematography: Jack Greenhalgh
- Edited by: Holbrook N. Todd
- Production company: Sigmund Neufeld Productions
- Distributed by: Producers Releasing Corporation
- Release date: December 12, 1941
- Running time: 55 minutes
- Country: United States
- Language: English

Billy the Kid's Round-Up is a 1941 American Western film directed by Sam Newfield and written by Fred Myton. The film stars Buster Crabbe, Al St. John, Carleton Young, Joan Barclay, Glenn Strange and Charles King. The film was released on December 12, 1941, by Producers Releasing Corporation.

== Cast ==
- Buster Crabbe as Billy the Kid
- Al St. John as Fuzzy Jones
- Carleton Young as Jeff
- Joan Barclay as Betty Webster
- Glenn Strange as Vic Landreau
- Charles King as Ed Slade
- Slim Whitaker as Sheriff Jim Hanley
- John Elliott as Dan Webster

== See also ==
The "Billy the Kid" films starring Buster Crabbe:

- Billy the Kid Wanted (1941)
- Billy the Kid's Round-Up (1941)
- Billy the Kid Trapped (1942)
- Billy the Kid's Smoking Guns (1942)
- Law and Order (1942)
- Sheriff of Sage Valley (1942)
- The Mysterious Rider (1942)
- The Kid Rides Again (1943)
- Fugitive of the Plains (1943)
- Western Cyclone (1943)
- Cattle Stampede (1943)
- The Renegade (1943)
- Blazing Frontier (1943)
- Devil Riders (1943)
- Frontier Outlaws (1944)
- Valley of Vengeance (1944)
- The Drifter (1944)
- Fuzzy Settles Down (1944)
- Rustlers' Hideout (1944)
- Wild Horse Phantom (1944)
- Oath of Vengeance (1944)
- His Brother's Ghost (1945)
- Thundering Gunslingers (1945)
- Shadows of Death (1945)
- Gangster's Den (1945)
- Stagecoach Outlaws (1945)
- Border Badmen (1945)
- Fighting Bill Carson (1945)
- Prairie Rustlers (1945)
- Lightning Raiders (1945)
- Terrors on Horseback (1946)
- Gentlemen with Guns (1946)
- Ghost of Hidden Valley (1946)
- Prairie Badmen (1946)
- Overland Riders (1946)
- Outlaws of the Plains (1946)
