= Fuzzy Settles Down =

1944 film by Sam Newfield

- Directed by: Sam Newfield
- Written by: Louise Rousseau
- Produced by: Sigmund Neufeld
- Starring: See below
- Cinematography: Jack Greenhalgh
- Edited by: Holbrook N. Todd
- Production company: P.R.C.
- Release date: July 25, 1944
- Running time: 60 minutes
- Country: United States
- Language: English

Fuzzy Settles Down is a 1944 American Western film directed by Sam Newfield.

== Plot ==
Two cowboys, Fuzzy Jones and Billy Carson, catch a pair of bank robbers; and then are endowed with the reward money. In the town of Red Rock the local newspaper editor John Martin is shot in the back and killed for his opposition of local outlaws attempting to steal the townsfolk's land. Fuzzy and Billy happen to ride into town on the day that the newspaper is put up for auction, and Fuzzy buys the paper with his high bid, hoping his reward money and subsequent purchase will allow him to peacefully settle down. Fuzzy meets Martin's daughter, Edith, consoles her for her loss. They find a common ground in the aversion of lawlessness and the outlaw's actions, and Fuzzy asks Edith to join him at the paper.

Fuzzy and Edith decide to continue the father's efforts to raise money for a new telegraph wire, so they can more easily communicate with the Texas Rangers. Fuzzy calls a town meeting at the Weaver ranch to discuss the outlaws, and it is attended by Lafe Barlow, who is secretly the leader of the outlaw gang. Barlow "warns" Fuzzy that if he continues to oppose the outlaws, then his life may be in danger. Barlow has also told his gang to raid the ranch, and while Fuzzy watches from the hills above the ranch, he sees one of Barlow's thugs, Rusty, attempt to set fire to the barn. Fuzzy rides down, stops him, and drags Rusty to the meeting to interrogate him. Barlow secretly cuts the lights and Rusty escapes.

The following day Fuzzy is attacked on his way into town to pick up supplies for the telegraph line, but is rescued by Billy. The coalition of ranchers raise $10,000, and entrust it to Fuzzy. As Fuzzy is attempting to hide the money, Barlow's gang break into the room. The outlaws steal the money and kidnap Fuzzy. The townfolk are suspicious when Fuzzy is missing, then one of Barlow's thugs escorts Fuzzy into town with his gun drawn. Fuzzy tells everyone that he was mugged, robbed and kidnapped, but Barlow accuses Fuzzy of being the one who stole the money, and the sheriff arrests Fuzzy. Billy knows something is wrong and heads for the Barlow ranch, but he's followed by Pete, the thug who escorted Fuzzy into town at gunpoint. Billy manages to overpower Pete, and when he finds the missing money in Barlow's desk drawer he persuades Pete to testify against Barlow.

The pair ride into town and confront Barlow in the saloon. Barlow sees that Pete is going to betray him and draws and shoots Pete. He then orders Billy to drop his gun, but Billy throws the gun to the wounded Pete who grabs the gun and shoots Barlow. Billy Carson sees that the bad guys have been defeated, and hops on his horse to head out of town. Fuzzy then gifts the newspaper to Edith, and follows his friend off into the sunset.

== Cast ==
- Buster Crabbe as Billy Carson
- Falcon as Billy's Horse
- Al St. John as Fuzzy Q. Jones
- Patti McCarty as Edith Martin
- Charles King as Lafe Barlow
- John Merton as Henchman Pete
- Frank McCarroll as Henchman Rusty
- Hal Price as Sheriff Sam of Red Rock
- John Elliott as John Martin (Newspaper Editor)
- Ed Cassidy as Weaver (Rancher)
- Robert F. Hill as Jones - Bidder for Newspaper

== See also ==
The "Billy the Kid" films starring Buster Crabbe:

- Billy the Kid Wanted (1941)
- Billy the Kid's Round-Up (1941)
- Billy the Kid Trapped (1942)
- Billy the Kid's Smoking Guns (1942)
- Law and Order (1942)
- Sheriff of Sage Valley (1942)
- The Mysterious Rider (1942)
- The Kid Rides Again (1943)
- Fugitive of the Plains (1943)
- Western Cyclone (1943)
- Cattle Stampede (1943)
- The Renegade (1943)
- Blazing Frontier (1943)
- Devil Riders (1943)
- Frontier Outlaws (1944)
- Valley of Vengeance (1944)
- The Drifter (1944)
- Fuzzy Settles Down (1944)
- Rustlers' Hideout (1944)
- Wild Horse Phantom (1944)
- Oath of Vengeance (1944)
- His Brother's Ghost (1945)
- Thundering Gunslingers (1945)
- Shadows of Death (1945)
- Gangster's Den (1945)
- Stagecoach Outlaws (1945)
- Border Badmen (1945)
- Fighting Bill Carson (1945)
- Prairie Rustlers (1945)
- Lightning Raiders (1945)
- Terrors on Horseback (1946)
- Gentlemen with Guns (1946)
- Ghost of Hidden Valley (1946)
- Prairie Badmen (1946)
- Overland Riders (1946)
- Outlaws of the Plains (1946)
