= Lightning Raiders (film) =

1945 western film

- Theatrical release poster
- Directed by: Sam Newfield
- Screenplay by: Elmer Clifton
- Produced by: Sigmund Neufeld
- Starring: Buster Crabbe; Al St. John; Mady Lawrence; Henry Hall; Steve Darrell; I. Stanford Jolley; Karl Hackett; Roy Brent
- Cinematography: Jack Greenhalgh
- Edited by: Holbrook N. Todd
- Production company: Sigmund Neufeld Productions
- Distributed by: Producers Releasing Corporation
- Release date: January 7, 1946
- Running time: 61 minutes
- Country: United States
- Language: English

Lightning Raiders is a 1946 American Western film directed by Sam Newfield and written by Elmer Clifton. The film stars Buster Crabbe, Al St. John, Mady Lawrence, Henry Hall, Steve Darrell, I. Stanford Jolley, Karl Hackett and Roy Brent. The film was released on January 7, 1946, by Producers Releasing Corporation.

== Cast ==
- Buster Crabbe as Billy Carson
- Al St. John as Fuzzy Jones
- Mady Lawrence as Jane Wright
- Henry Hall as George Wright
- Steve Darrell as Frank Hayden
- I. Stanford Jolley as Kane
- Karl Hackett as Jim Murray
- Roy Brent as Al Phillips
- Marin Sais as Mrs. Loren
- Al Ferguson as Paul Loren

== See also ==
The "Billy the Kid" films starring Buster Crabbe:

- Billy the Kid Wanted (1941)
- Billy the Kid's Round-Up (1941)
- Billy the Kid Trapped (1942)
- Billy the Kid's Smoking Guns (1942)
- Law and Order (1942)
- Sheriff of Sage Valley (1942)
- The Mysterious Rider (1942)
- The Kid Rides Again (1943)
- Fugitive of the Plains (1943)
- Western Cyclone (1943)
- Cattle Stampede (1943)
- The Renegade (1943)
- Blazing Frontier (1943)
- Devil Riders (1943)
- Frontier Outlaws (1944)
- Valley of Vengeance (1944)
- The Drifter (1944)
- Fuzzy Settles Down (1944)
- Rustlers' Hideout (1944)
- Wild Horse Phantom (1944)
- Oath of Vengeance (1944)
- His Brother's Ghost (1945)
- Thundering Gunslingers (1945)
- Shadows of Death (1945)
- Gangster's Den (1945)
- Stagecoach Outlaws (1945)
- Border Badmen (1945)
- Fighting Bill Carson (1945)
- Prairie Rustlers (1945)
- Lightning Raiders (1945)
- Terrors on Horseback (1946)
- Gentlemen with Guns (1946)
- Ghost of Hidden Valley (1946)
- Prairie Badmen (1946)
- Overland Riders (1946)
- Outlaws of the Plains (1946)
