= Border Badmen =

1945 film directed by Sam Newfield

- Theatrical release poster
- Directed by: Sam Newfield
- Screenplay by: Milton Raison
- Produced by: Sigmund Neufeld
- Starring: Buster Crabbe; Al St. John; Lorraine Miller; Charles King; Ray Bennett; Arch Hall Sr.
- Cinematography: Jack Greenhalgh
- Edited by: Holbrook N. Todd
- Production company: Sigmund Neufeld Productions
- Distributed by: Producers Releasing Corporation
- Release date: October 10, 1945
- Running time: 55 minutes
- Country: United States
- Language: English

Border Badmen is a 1945 American Western film directed by Sam Newfield and written by Milton Raison. The film stars Buster Crabbe, Al St. John, Lorraine Miller, Charles King, Ray Bennett and Arch Hall Sr. The film was released on October 10, 1945, by Producers Releasing Corporation.

== Cast ==
- Buster Crabbe as Billy Carson
- Al St. John as Fuzzy Q. Jones
- Lorraine Miller as Helen Stockton
- Charles King as Merritt
- Ray Bennett as Deputy Spencer
- Arch Hall Sr. as Gillan
- Budd Buster as Peter Evans
- Marilyn Gladstone as Roxie
- Marin Sais as Mrs. Bentley

== See also ==
The "Billy the Kid" films starring Buster Crabbe:

- Billy the Kid Wanted (1941)
- Billy the Kid's Round-Up (1941)
- Billy the Kid Trapped (1942)
- Billy the Kid's Smoking Guns (1942)
- Law and Order (1942)
- Sheriff of Sage Valley (1942)
- The Mysterious Rider (1942)
- The Kid Rides Again (1943)
- Fugitive of the Plains (1943)
- Western Cyclone (1943)
- Cattle Stampede (1943)
- The Renegade (1943)
- Blazing Frontier (1943)
- Devil Riders (1943)
- Frontier Outlaws (1944)
- Valley of Vengeance (1944)
- The Drifter (1944)
- Fuzzy Settles Down (1944)
- Rustlers' Hideout (1944)
- Wild Horse Phantom (1944)
- Oath of Vengeance (1944)
- His Brother's Ghost (1945)
- Thundering Gunslingers (1945)
- Shadows of Death (1945)
- Gangster's Den (1945)
- Stagecoach Outlaws (1945)
- Border Badmen (1945)
- Fighting Bill Carson (1945)
- Prairie Rustlers (1945)
- Lightning Raiders (1945)
- Terrors on Horseback (1946)
- Gentlemen with Guns (1946)
- Ghost of Hidden Valley (1946)
- Prairie Badmen (1946)
- Overland Riders (1946)
- Outlaws of the Plains (1946)
