= Overland Riders =

1946 film

- Theatrical release poster
- Directed by: Sam Newfield
- Screenplay by: Ellen Coyle
- Produced by: Sigmund Neufeld
- Starring: Buster Crabbe; Al St. John; Patti McCarty; Slim Whitaker; Bud Osborne; Jack O'Shea
- Cinematography: Jack Greenhalgh
- Edited by: Holbrook N. Todd
- Production company: Sigmund Neufeld Productions
- Distributed by: Producers Releasing Corporation
- Release date: August 21, 1946
- Running time: 53 minutes
- Country: United States
- Language: English

Overland Riders is a 1946 American Western film directed by Sam Newfield and written by Ellen Coyle. The film stars Buster Crabbe, Al St. John, Patti McCarty, Slim Whitaker, Bud Osborne and Jack O'Shea. The film was released on August 21, 1946, by Producers Releasing Corporation.

== Cast ==
- Buster Crabbe as Billy Carson
- Al St. John as Fuzzy Jones
- Patti McCarty as Jean Barkley
- Slim Whitaker as Jeff Barkley
- Bud Osborne as Sheriff Dawson
- Jack O'Shea as Vic Landreau
- Frank Ellis as Cherokee
- Al Ferguson as Tug Wilson
- John L. Cason as Hank Fowler
- George Chesebro as Jim Rance
- Lane Bradford as Deputy

== See also ==
The "Billy the Kid" films starring Buster Crabbe:

- Billy the Kid Wanted (1941)
- Billy the Kid's Round-Up (1941)
- Billy the Kid Trapped (1942)
- Billy the Kid's Smoking Guns (1942)
- Law and Order (1942)
- Sheriff of Sage Valley (1942)
- The Mysterious Rider (1942)
- The Kid Rides Again (1943)
- Fugitive of the Plains (1943)
- Western Cyclone (1943)
- Cattle Stampede (1943)
- The Renegade (1943)
- Blazing Frontier (1943)
- Devil Riders (1943)
- Frontier Outlaws (1944)
- Valley of Vengeance (1944)
- The Drifter (1944)
- Fuzzy Settles Down (1944)
- Rustlers' Hideout (1944)
- Wild Horse Phantom (1944)
- Oath of Vengeance (1944)
- His Brother's Ghost (1945)
- Thundering Gunslingers (1945)
- Shadows of Death (1945)
- Gangster's Den (1945)
- Stagecoach Outlaws (1945)
- Border Badmen (1945)
- Fighting Bill Carson (1945)
- Prairie Rustlers (1945)
- Lightning Raiders (1945)
- Terrors on Horseback (1946)
- Gentlemen with Guns (1946)
- Ghost of Hidden Valley (1946)
- Prairie Badmen (1946)
- Overland Riders (1946)
- Outlaws of the Plains (1946)
