= Cattle Stampede =

1943 film by Sam Newfield

- Film poster
- Directed by: Sam Newfield
- Written by: Joseph O'Donnell (story); Joseph O'Donnell (screenplay)
- Produced by: Sigmund Neufeld (producer)
- Starring: See below
- Cinematography: Robert E. Cline
- Edited by: Holbrook N. Todd
- Distributed by: Producers Releasing Corporation
- Release date: August 16, 1943
- Running time: 58 minutes
- Country: United States
- Language: English

Cattle Stampede is a 1943 American Producers Releasing Corporation Western film of the "Billy the Kid" series directed by Sam Newfield.

== Plot ==
Pursued through Arizona by a gang of outlaws turned bounty hunters for the massive reward on Billy's head, Billy and Fuzzy are led to safety by Ed Dawson. Suspicious as to why anyone would help them, Dawson tells them he feels Billy as not as bad as he is made out to be. More importantly he needs Billy and Fuzzy to work on his cattle ranch in New Mexico which is facing cattle rustling and the murder of their cowboys. Ed is wounded by the bounty hunters, but Billy is able to save his life by risking his own life to bring a doctor to Ed.

As Ed convalesces, Billy and Fuzzy ride to Ed's sister's ranch in New Mexico. When they see her trail boss Brandon trying to get his crew to quit and work for another rancher, Fuzzy humiliates him, beats him up and drives him off the Dawson ranch. Keeping his true identity secret, Billy is made the new trail boss. Faced by rustling and offers to sell out by the wealthy Mr Stone, who Brandon really works for. Billy teams up with all the other victims of Stone's murders and rustling to form a "trail patrol" to protect their stock and defeat the outlaws.

== Cast ==
- Buster Crabbe as Billy the Kid
- Al St. John as Fuzzy Q. Jones
- Frances Gladwin as Mary Dawson
- Charles King as Brandon
- Ed Cassidy as Sam Dawson
- Hansel Warner as Ed Dawson
- Glen Strange as Stone
- Frank Ellis as Henchman Elkins
- Steve Clark as Henchman Turner
- Roy Brent as Henchman Slater
- John Elliott as Doctor George Arnold
- Budd Buster as Rancher Jensen, Kelly's Pal

== See also ==
The "Billy the Kid" films starring Buster Crabbe:

- Billy the Kid Wanted (1941)
- Billy the Kid's Round-Up (1941)
- Billy the Kid Trapped (1942)
- Billy the Kid's Smoking Guns (1942)
- Law and Order (1942)
- Sheriff of Sage Valley (1942)
- The Mysterious Rider (1942)
- The Kid Rides Again (1943)
- Fugitive of the Plains (1943)
- Western Cyclone (1943)
- Cattle Stampede (1943)
- The Renegade (1943)
- Blazing Frontier (1943)
- Devil Riders (1943)
- Frontier Outlaws (1944)
- Valley of Vengeance (1944)
- The Drifter (1944)
- Fuzzy Settles Down (1944)
- Rustlers' Hideout (1944)
- Wild Horse Phantom (1944)
- Oath of Vengeance (1944)
- His Brother's Ghost (1945)
- Thundering Gunslingers (1945)
- Shadows of Death (1945)
- Gangster's Den (1945)
- Stagecoach Outlaws (1945)
- Border Badmen (1945)
- Fighting Bill Carson (1945)
- Prairie Rustlers (1945)
- Lightning Raiders (1945)
- Terrors on Horseback (1946)
- Gentlemen with Guns (1946)
- Ghost of Hidden Valley (1946)
- Prairie Badmen (1946)
- Overland Riders (1946)
- Outlaws of the Plains (1946)
