= Fighting Bill Carson =

1945 film directed by Sam Newfield

- Theatrical release poster
- Directed by: Sam Newfield
- Screenplay by: Louise Rousseau
- Produced by: Sigmund Neufeld
- Starring: Buster Crabbe; Al St. John; Kay Hughes; I. Stanford Jolley; Kermit Maynard; John Cason
- Cinematography: Jack Greenhalgh
- Edited by: Holbrook N. Todd
- Music by: Frank Sanucci
- Production company: Sigmund Neufeld Productions
- Distributed by: Producers Releasing Corporation
- Release date: October 31, 1945
- Running time: 53 minutes
- Country: United States
- Language: English

Fighting Bill Carson is a 1945 American Western film directed by Sam Newfield and written by Louise Rousseau. The film stars Buster Crabbe, Al St. John, Kay Hughes, I. Stanford Jolley, Kermit Maynard and John Cason. The film was released on October 31, 1945, by Producers Releasing Corporation.

== Cast ==
- Buster Crabbe as Billy Carson
- Al St. John as Fuzzy Q. Jones
- Kay Hughes as Jean Darcy
- I. Stanford Jolley as Clay Allison
- Kermit Maynard as Cass
- John Cason as Joe
- John L. Buster as Steve
- Bud Osborne as Sheriff

== See also ==
The "Billy the Kid" films starring Buster Crabbe:

- Billy the Kid Wanted (1941)
- Billy the Kid's Round-Up (1941)
- Billy the Kid Trapped (1942)
- Billy the Kid's Smoking Guns (1942)
- Law and Order (1942)
- Sheriff of Sage Valley (1942)
- The Mysterious Rider (1942)
- The Kid Rides Again (1943)
- Fugitive of the Plains (1943)
- Western Cyclone (1943)
- Cattle Stampede (1943)
- The Renegade (1943)
- Blazing Frontier (1943)
- Devil Riders (1943)
- Frontier Outlaws (1944)
- Valley of Vengeance (1944)
- The Drifter (1944)
- Fuzzy Settles Down (1944)
- Rustlers' Hideout (1944)
- Wild Horse Phantom (1944)
- Oath of Vengeance (1944)
- His Brother's Ghost (1945)
- Thundering Gunslingers (1945)
- Shadows of Death (1945)
- Gangster's Den (1945)
- Stagecoach Outlaws (1945)
- Border Badmen (1945)
- Fighting Bill Carson (1945)
- Prairie Rustlers (1945)
- Lightning Raiders (1945)
- Terrors on Horseback (1946)
- Gentlemen with Guns (1946)
- Ghost of Hidden Valley (1946)
- Prairie Badmen (1946)
- Overland Riders (1946)
- Outlaws of the Plains (1946)
