= Stagecoach Outlaws =

1945 film

- Theatrical release poster
- Directed by: Sam Newfield
- Screenplay by: Fred Myton
- Produced by: Sigmund Neufeld
- Starring: Buster Crabbe; Al St. John; Frances Gladwin; Ed Cassidy; I. Stanford Jolley; Kermit Maynard
- Cinematography: Jack Greenhalgh
- Edited by: Holbrook N. Todd
- Production company: Sigmund Neufeld Productions
- Distributed by: Producers Releasing Corporation
- Release date: August 17, 1945
- Running time: 58 minutes
- Country: United States
- Language: English

Stagecoach Outlaws is a 1945 American Western film directed by Sam Newfield and written by Fred Myton. The film stars Buster Crabbe, Al St. John, Frances Gladwin, Ed Cassidy, I. Stanford Jolley and Kermit Maynard. The film was released on August 17, 1945, by Producers Releasing Corporation.

== Cast ==
- Buster Crabbe as Billy Carson
- Al St. John as Fuzzy Jones
- Frances Gladwin as Linda Bowen
- Ed Cassidy as Jed Bowen
- I. Stanford Jolley as Steve Kirby
- Kermit Maynard as Vic Dawson
- John Cason as Joe Slade
- Bob Kortman as Matt Brawley
- Steve Clark as Sheriff

== See also ==
The "Billy the Kid" films starring Buster Crabbe:

- Billy the Kid Wanted (1941)
- Billy the Kid's Round-Up (1941)
- Billy the Kid Trapped (1942)
- Billy the Kid's Smoking Guns (1942)
- Law and Order (1942)
- Sheriff of Sage Valley (1942)
- The Mysterious Rider (1942)
- The Kid Rides Again (1943)
- Fugitive of the Plains (1943)
- Western Cyclone (1943)
- Cattle Stampede (1943)
- The Renegade (1943)
- Blazing Frontier (1943)
- Devil Riders (1943)
- Frontier Outlaws (1944)
- Valley of Vengeance (1944)
- The Drifter (1944)
- Fuzzy Settles Down (1944)
- Rustlers' Hideout (1944)
- Wild Horse Phantom (1944)
- Oath of Vengeance (1944)
- His Brother's Ghost (1945)
- Thundering Gunslingers (1945)
- Shadows of Death (1945)
- Gangster's Den (1945)
- Stagecoach Outlaws (1945)
- Border Badmen (1945)
- Fighting Bill Carson (1945)
- Prairie Rustlers (1945)
- Lightning Raiders (1945)
- Terrors on Horseback (1946)
- Gentlemen with Guns (1946)
- Ghost of Hidden Valley (1946)
- Prairie Badmen (1946)
- Overland Riders (1946)
- Outlaws of the Plains (1946)
