= Billy the Kid Trapped =

1942 film by Sam Newfield

- Theatrical poster
- Directed by: Sam Newfield
- Written by: Joseph O'Donnell
- Produced by: Sigmund Neufeld
- Starring: Buster Crabbe
- Cinematography: Jack Greenhalgh
- Edited by: Holbrook N. Todd
- Release date: 27 February 1942
- Running time: 59 minutes
- Country: United States
- Language: English

Billy the Kid Trapped is a 1942 American Western film directed by Sam Newfield.

== Plot ==
Imprisoned and sentenced to death for crimes they did not commit, Billy, Fuzzy and Jeff break out of jail. The three escapees discover that there are three impersonators who dress as them committing the crimes. On their mission to clear their names and bring the three impersonators to justice, the trio discovers the town of Mesa Verde where outlaws are given sanctuary in exchange for paying for legal protection.

== Cast ==
- Buster Crabbe as Billy the Kid
- Al St. John as Fuzzy Q. Jones
- Malcolm 'Bud' McTaggart as Jeff Walker
- Anne Jeffreys as Sally Crane
- Glenn Strange as Boss Stanton
- Walter McGrail as Judge Jack McConnell
- Ted Adams as Sheriff John Masters
- Jack Ingram as Henchman Red Barton
- Milton Kibbee as Judge Clarke
- Eddie Phillips as Stage Driver Dave Evans
- Budd Buster as Montana / Fake Fuzzy

== See also ==
The "Billy the Kid" films starring Buster Crabbe:

- Billy the Kid Wanted (1941)
- Billy the Kid's Round-Up (1941)
- Billy the Kid Trapped (1942)
- Billy the Kid's Smoking Guns (1942)
- Law and Order (1942)
- Sheriff of Sage Valley (1942)
- The Mysterious Rider (1942)
- The Kid Rides Again (1943)
- Fugitive of the Plains (1943)
- Western Cyclone (1943)
- Cattle Stampede (1943)
- The Renegade (1943)
- Blazing Frontier (1943)
- Devil Riders (1943)
- Frontier Outlaws (1944)
- Valley of Vengeance (1944)
- The Drifter (1944)
- Fuzzy Settles Down (1944)
- Rustlers' Hideout (1944)
- Wild Horse Phantom (1944)
- Oath of Vengeance (1944)
- His Brother's Ghost (1945)
- Thundering Gunslingers (1945)
- Shadows of Death (1945)
- Gangster's Den (1945)
- Stagecoach Outlaws (1945)
- Border Badmen (1945)
- Fighting Bill Carson (1945)
- Prairie Rustlers (1945)
- Lightning Raiders (1945)
- Terrors on Horseback (1946)
- Gentlemen with Guns (1946)
- Ghost of Hidden Valley (1946)
- Prairie Badmen (1946)
- Overland Riders (1946)
- Outlaws of the Plains (1946)
