= The Kid Rides Again =

1943 film by Sam Newfield

- Directed by: Sam Newfield
- Written by: Fred Myton (story and screenplay)
- Produced by: Sigmund Neufeld (producer)
- Starring: See below
- Cinematography: Jack Greenhalgh
- Edited by: Holbrook N. Todd
- Music by: Leo Erdody
- Distributed by: Producers Releasing Corporation
- Release date: January 27, 1943
- Running time: 55 minutes
- Country: United States
- Language: English

The Kid Rides Again is a 1943 American western directed by Sam Newfield. The film was one of the Billy the Kid (film series by Producers Releasing Corporation. It was Iris Meredith's last credited feature film role.

== Cast ==
- Buster Crabbe as Billy the Kid
- Al St. John as Fuzzy Q. Jones
- Iris Meredith as Joan Ainsley
- Glenn Strange as Henchman Tom Slade
- Charles King as Vic Landeau, Henchman
- I. Stanford Jolley as Mort Slade
- Edward Peil Sr. as John Ainsley
- Ted Adams as Sundown Sheriff
- Slim Whitaker as Texas Sheriff

== See also ==
The "Billy the Kid" films starring Buster Crabbe:

- Billy the Kid Wanted (1941)
- Billy the Kid's Round-Up (1941)
- Billy the Kid Trapped (1942)
- Billy the Kid's Smoking Guns (1942)
- Law and Order (1942)
- Sheriff of Sage Valley (1942)
- The Mysterious Rider (1942)
- The Kid Rides Again (1943)
- Fugitive of the Plains (1943)
- Western Cyclone (1943)
- Cattle Stampede (1943)
- The Renegade (1943)
- Blazing Frontier (1943)
- Devil Riders (1943)
- Frontier Outlaws (1944)
- Valley of Vengeance (1944)
- The Drifter (1944)
- Fuzzy Settles Down (1944)
- Rustlers' Hideout (1944)
- Wild Horse Phantom (1944)
- Oath of Vengeance (1944)
- His Brother's Ghost (1945)
- Thundering Gunslingers (1945)
- Shadows of Death (1945)
- Gangster's Den (1945)
- Stagecoach Outlaws (1945)
- Border Badmen (1945)
- Fighting Bill Carson (1945)
- Prairie Rustlers (1945)
- Lightning Raiders (1945)
- Terrors on Horseback (1946)
- Gentlemen with Guns (1946)
- Ghost of Hidden Valley (1946)
- Prairie Badmen (1946)
- Overland Riders (1946)
- Outlaws of the Plains (1946)
