= Blazing Frontier =

1943 film by Sam Newfield

- Film poster
- Directed by: Sam Newfield
- Written by: Patricia Harper
- Produced by: Sigmund Neufeld
- Cinematography: Robert E. Cline
- Edited by: Holbrook N. Todd
- Release date: 1943
- Running time: 59 minutes
- Country: United States
- Language: English

Blazing Frontier is a 1943 American Western film directed by Sam Newfield. The film is also known as Blazing Range (American recut version).

== Cast ==
- Buster Crabbe as Billy the Kid
- Al St. John as Fuzzy Q. Jones
- Marjorie Manners as Helen Barstow
- Milton Kibbee as Clem Barstow
- I. Stanford Jolley as Luther Sharp
- Frank Hagney as Sheriff Ward Tragg
- Kermit Maynard as Deputy Pete
- George Chesebro as Deputy Slade
- Frank Ellis as Deputy Biff

== See also ==
The "Billy the Kid" films starring Buster Crabbe:

- Billy the Kid Wanted (1941)
- Billy the Kid's Round-Up (1941)
- Billy the Kid Trapped (1942)
- Billy the Kid's Smoking Guns (1942)
- Law and Order (1942)
- Sheriff of Sage Valley (1942)
- The Mysterious Rider (1942)
- The Kid Rides Again (1943)
- Fugitive of the Plains (1943)
- Western Cyclone (1943)
- Cattle Stampede (1943)
- The Renegade (1943)
- Blazing Frontier (1943)
- Devil Riders (1943)
- Frontier Outlaws (1944)
- Valley of Vengeance (1944)
- The Drifter (1944)
- Fuzzy Settles Down (1944)
- Rustlers' Hideout (1944)
- Wild Horse Phantom (1944)
- Oath of Vengeance (1944)
- His Brother's Ghost (1945)
- Thundering Gunslingers (1945)
- Shadows of Death (1945)
- Gangster's Den (1945)
- Stagecoach Outlaws (1945)
- Border Badmen (1945)
- Fighting Bill Carson (1945)
- Prairie Rustlers (1945)
- Lightning Raiders (1945)
- Terrors on Horseback (1946)
- Gentlemen with Guns (1946)
- Ghost of Hidden Valley (1946)
- Prairie Badmen (1946)
- Overland Riders (1946)
- Outlaws of the Plains (1946)
