= Oath of Vengeance =

1944 film

- Film poster
- Directed by: Sam Newfield
- Written by: Fred Myton (original story and screenplay)
- Produced by: Sigmund Neufeld (producer)
- Starring: See below
- Cinematography: Robert E. Cline
- Edited by: Holbrook N. Todd
- Music by: Producers Releasing Corporation
- Release date: 9 December 1944
- Running time: 57 minutes 58 minutes (UK DVD)
- Country: United States
- Language: English

Oath of Vengeance is a 1944 American Western film directed by Sam Newfield. Shot at Corriganville Movie Ranch, the film was released by Producers Releasing Corporation as one of the studio's Billy the Kid film series.

== Plot ==
Fuzzy decides to give up the cowboy life after a calf he unsuccessfully hogtied gets her revenge by dragging Fuzzy through the prairie by his own lasso. Fuzzy purchases a general store figuring by buying things low and selling things at a higher price he'll be rich. Fuzzy's dreams come to a long pause when he discovers all his customers purchase their goods by credit, paying them back when their harvests or cattle sales come through. Adding to Fuzzy's woes are the fact that he shares his store with an angry postmistress.

Meanwhile, two villains see their chance to become rich by playing the cattlemen, led by female boss Dale Kirby, and the farmers represented by Dan Harper against each other. The ensuing range war would benefit the pair with their buying the farmer's land when they are driven off and taking the proceeds of rustled cattle that the pair blame on the farmers. Billy Carson sees their game and takes them on as well as the hostile cattlemen and farmers.

== Cast ==
- Buster Crabbe as Billy Carson
- Falcon as Billy's horse
- Al St. John as Fuzzy Q. Jones
- Mady Lawrence as Dale Kirby
- Jack Ingram as Steve Kinney
- Charles King as Henchman Mort
- Marin Sais as Ma, the Postmistress
- Karl Hackett as Dan Harper
- Kermit Maynard as Ranch Foreman Red
- Hal Price as Sheriff
- Frank Ellis as Kirby rider Vic

== Quotes ==
Billy: You always do things the hard way, Fuzzy
Fuzzy: At least I get things done

== See also ==
The "Billy the Kid" films starring Buster Crabbe:

- Billy the Kid Wanted (1941)
- Billy the Kid's Round-Up (1941)
- Billy the Kid Trapped (1942)
- Billy the Kid's Smoking Guns (1942)
- Law and Order (1942)
- Sheriff of Sage Valley (1942)
- The Mysterious Rider (1942)
- The Kid Rides Again (1943)
- Fugitive of the Plains (1943)
- Western Cyclone (1943)
- Cattle Stampede (1943)
- The Renegade (1943)
- Blazing Frontier (1943)
- Devil Riders (1943)
- Frontier Outlaws (1944)
- Valley of Vengeance (1944)
- The Drifter (1944)
- Fuzzy Settles Down (1944)
- Rustlers' Hideout (1944)
- Wild Horse Phantom (1944)
- Oath of Vengeance (1944)
- His Brother's Ghost (1945)
- Thundering Gunslingers (1945)
- Shadows of Death (1945)
- Gangster's Den (1945)
- Stagecoach Outlaws (1945)
- Border Badmen (1945)
- Fighting Bill Carson (1945)
- Prairie Rustlers (1945)
- Lightning Raiders (1945)
- Terrors on Horseback (1946)
- Gentlemen with Guns (1946)
- Ghost of Hidden Valley (1946)
- Prairie Badmen (1946)
- Overland Riders (1946)
- Outlaws of the Plains (1946)
