= The Drifter (1944 film) =

1944 film by Sam Newfield

- Theatrical release poster
- Directed by: Sam Newfield
- Screenplay by: Patricia Harper
- Produced by: Sigmund Neufeld
- Starring: Buster Crabbe; Al St. John; Carol Parker; Jack Ingram; Jimmy Aubrey; Slim Whitaker
- Cinematography: Robert E. Cline
- Edited by: Holbrook N. Todd
- Production company: Sigmund Neufeld Productions
- Distributed by: Producers Releasing Corporation
- Release date: June 14, 1944
- Running time: 62 minutes
- Country: United States
- Language: English

The Drifter is a 1944 American Western film directed by Sam Newfield and written by Patricia Harper. The film stars Buster Crabbe, Al St. John, Carol Parker, Jack Ingram, Jimmy Aubrey and Slim Whitaker. The film was released on June 14, 1944, by Producers Releasing Corporation.

== Cast ==
- Buster Crabbe as Billy Carson / Drifter Davis
- Al St. John as Fuzzy Q. Jones
- Carol Parker as Sally Dawson
- Jack Ingram as Dirk Trent
- Jimmy Aubrey as Sheriff Perkins
- Slim Whitaker as Marshal Hodges
- Ray Bennett as Simms
- Kermit Maynard as Jack
- Roy Brent as Sam
- George Chesebro as Blackie

== See also ==
The "Billy the Kid" films starring Buster Crabbe:

- Billy the Kid Wanted (1941)
- Billy the Kid's Round-Up (1941)
- Billy the Kid Trapped (1942)
- Billy the Kid's Smoking Guns (1942)
- Law and Order (1942)
- Sheriff of Sage Valley (1942)
- The Mysterious Rider (1942)
- The Kid Rides Again (1943)
- Fugitive of the Plains (1943)
- Western Cyclone (1943)
- Cattle Stampede (1943)
- The Renegade (1943)
- Blazing Frontier (1943)
- Devil Riders (1943)
- Frontier Outlaws (1944)
- Valley of Vengeance (1944)
- The Drifter (1944)
- Fuzzy Settles Down (1944)
- Rustlers' Hideout (1944)
- Wild Horse Phantom (1944)
- Oath of Vengeance (1944)
- His Brother's Ghost (1945)
- Thundering Gunslingers (1945)
- Shadows of Death (1945)
- Gangster's Den (1945)
- Stagecoach Outlaws (1945)
- Border Badmen (1945)
- Fighting Bill Carson (1945)
- Prairie Rustlers (1945)
- Lightning Raiders (1945)
- Terrors on Horseback (1946)
- Gentlemen with Guns (1946)
- Ghost of Hidden Valley (1946)
- Prairie Badmen (1946)
- Overland Riders (1946)
- Outlaws of the Plains (1946)
