= Frontier Outlaws =

1944 film by Sam Newfield

- Original lobby card
- Directed by: Sam Newfield
- Written by: Joseph O'Donnell
- Produced by: Sigmund Neufeld
- Starring: See below
- Cinematography: Robert E. Cline
- Edited by: Holbrook N. Todd
- Distributed by: Producers Releasing Corporation
- Release date: 4 March 1944 (US)
- Running time: 58 minutes
- Country: United States
- Language: English

Frontier Outlaws is a 1944 American Western film directed by Sam Newfield and shot at Corriganville Movie Ranch. It was the second film in Producers Releasing Corporation's Billy the Kid film series where Crabbe was credited as "Billy Carson".

== Plot ==
A gang of cattle rustlers and claim jumpers are terrorizing the town of Wolf Valley and hire a gunslinger to get rid of Billy Carson by running him out of town. To the villains' surprise, Billy arrives at a saloon frequented by them and runs the frightened gunslinger out of town. When the gunslinger tries to shoot Billy in the back with a concealed derringer, Billy finishes him off. Though Judge James Ryan is well aware of the true situation, he sentences Billy to 30 days in jail, but secretly lets Billy loose to finish off the villains. Billy disguises himself as a Mexican Charro interested in buying Barlow's rustled cattle in order to gain information and bring the outlaws to justice.

Meanwhile, the outlaws threaten the feisty owner of the Circle C Ranch, Ma Clark, who is not easily pushed around and has her sights set on marrying Judge Ryan.

== Cast ==
- Buster Crabbe as Billy Carson
- Al St. John as Fuzzy Q. Jones
- Frances Gladwin as Pat Clark
- Charles King as Barlow
- Marin Sais as Ma Clark
- Emmett Lynn as Judge James Ryan
- Kermit Maynard as Henchman Wallace
- Ed Cassidy as the Sheriff
- Jack Ingram as Henchman Taylor
- Budd Buster as Bartender

== Soundtrack ==
- Tex Williams and the Big Slicker Band - "Don't Waste No Worry Over Me"
- "Home on the Range" - Music by Daniel E. Kelley

== See also ==
The "Billy the Kid" films starring Buster Crabbe:

- Billy the Kid Wanted (1941)
- Billy the Kid's Round-Up (1941)
- Billy the Kid Trapped (1942)
- Billy the Kid's Smoking Guns (1942)
- Law and Order (1942)
- Sheriff of Sage Valley (1942)
- The Mysterious Rider (1942)
- The Kid Rides Again (1943)
- Fugitive of the Plains (1943)
- Western Cyclone (1943)
- Cattle Stampede (1943)
- The Renegade (1943)
- Blazing Frontier (1943)
- Devil Riders (1943)
- Frontier Outlaws (1944)
- Valley of Vengeance (1944)
- The Drifter (1944)
- Fuzzy Settles Down (1944)
- Rustlers' Hideout (1944)
- Wild Horse Phantom (1944)
- Oath of Vengeance (1944)
- His Brother's Ghost (1945)
- Thundering Gunslingers (1945)
- Shadows of Death (1945)
- Gangster's Den (1945)
- Stagecoach Outlaws (1945)
- Border Badmen (1945)
- Fighting Bill Carson (1945)
- Prairie Rustlers (1945)
- Lightning Raiders (1945)
- Terrors on Horseback (1946)
- Gentlemen with Guns (1946)
- Ghost of Hidden Valley (1946)
- Prairie Badmen (1946)
- Overland Riders (1946)
- Outlaws of the Plains (1946)
