= His Brother's Ghost =

1945 film by Sam Newfield

- Theatrical release poster
- Directed by: Sam Newfield
- Written by: George Wallace Sayre
- Produced by: Sigmund Neufeld
- Starring: See below
- Cinematography: Jack Greenhalgh
- Edited by: Holbrook N. Todd
- Music by: Frank Sanucci
- Distributed by: Producers Releasing Corporation
- Release date: February 3, 1945
- Running time: 58 minutes
- Country: United States
- Language: English

His Brother's Ghost is a 1945 American Western film directed by Sam Newfield.

== Plot ==
When a group of gunmen are running sharecroppers off their land, rancher Andy Jones sends for his friend Billy Carson to organise the sharecroppers to fight. Andy is soon mortally wounded by the gunmen, but before his death schemes for his no good twin brother Fuzzy to be sent for to impersonate him. The gunmen, witnessing Andy's funeral fear that Fuzzy is Andy's avenging ghost.

== Cast ==
- Buster Crabbe as Billy Carson
- Falcon as Billy's Horse
- Al St. John as Jonathan "Fuzzy" Q. Jones / Andy Jones
- Charles King as Thorne
- Karl Hackett as 'Doc' Packard
- Arch Hall Sr. as Deputy Bentley
- Roy Brent as Henchman Yeager
- Bud Osborne as Henchman Magill
- John L. Cason as Henchman Jarrett
- Frank McCarroll as Henchman Madison
- George Morrell as Foster

== See also ==
The "Billy the Kid" films starring Buster Crabbe:

- Billy the Kid Wanted (1941)
- Billy the Kid's Round-Up (1941)
- Billy the Kid Trapped (1942)
- Billy the Kid's Smoking Guns (1942)
- Law and Order (1942)
- Sheriff of Sage Valley (1942)
- The Mysterious Rider (1942)
- The Kid Rides Again (1943)
- Fugitive of the Plains (1943)
- Western Cyclone (1943)
- Cattle Stampede (1943)
- The Renegade (1943)
- Blazing Frontier (1943)
- Devil Riders (1943)
- Frontier Outlaws (1944)
- Valley of Vengeance (1944)
- The Drifter (1944)
- Fuzzy Settles Down (1944)
- Rustlers' Hideout (1944)
- Wild Horse Phantom (1944)
- Oath of Vengeance (1944)
- His Brother's Ghost (1945)
- Thundering Gunslingers (1945)
- Shadows of Death (1945)
- Gangster's Den (1945)
- Stagecoach Outlaws (1945)
- Border Badmen (1945)
- Fighting Bill Carson (1945)
- Prairie Rustlers (1945)
- Lightning Raiders (1945)
- Terrors on Horseback (1946)
- Gentlemen with Guns (1946)
- Ghost of Hidden Valley (1946)
- Prairie Badmen (1946)
- Overland Riders (1946)
- Outlaws of the Plains (1946)
