= Devil Riders =

1943 film by Sam Newfield

- Original lobby card
- Directed by: Sam Newfield
- Written by: Joseph O'Donnell
- Produced by: Sigmund Neufeld
- Starring: See below
- Cinematography: Robert E. Cline
- Edited by: Robert O. Crandall
- Distributed by: Producers Releasing Corporation
- Release date: 5 November 1943
- Running time: 56 minutes
- Country: United States
- Language: English

Devil Riders is a 1943 American Western film directed by Sam Newfield. It was the first film in Producers Releasing Corporation's Billy the Kid film series where Crabbe changed his name to "Billy Carson".

== Plot ==
Billy and Fuzzy are in charge of the local branch of the Pony Express. When a stagecoach line comes to town the Pony Express retains the weekly mail delivery contract whilst the stagecoach line takes freight and passengers. When the stagecoach line decides to do a daily mail service Billy and Fuzzy initially welcome the competition. However, two scheming businessman feel the stagecoach line would threaten their wealth and they plot to have the Pony Express and stagecoach line fight each other by each blaming the other for the sabotage done by the henchmen of the businessmen.

== Cast ==
- Buster Crabbe as Billy Carson
- Al St. John as Fuzzy Q. Jones
- Patti McCarty as Sally Farrell
- Charles King as Del Stone
- John Merton as Jim Higgins
- Kermit Maynard as Henchman Red
- Frank LaRue as Tom Farrell
- Jack Ingram as Henchman Turner
- George Chesebro as Curley

== Soundtrack ==
- Tex Williams and the Big Slicker Band - "She's Mine"
- Tex Williams and the Big Slicker Band - "It Don't Mean Anything Now"

== See also ==
The "Billy the Kid" films starring Buster Crabbe:

- Billy the Kid Wanted (1941)
- Billy the Kid's Round-Up (1941)
- Billy the Kid Trapped (1942)
- Billy the Kid's Smoking Guns (1942)
- Law and Order (1942)
- Sheriff of Sage Valley (1942)
- The Mysterious Rider (1942)
- The Kid Rides Again (1943)
- Fugitive of the Plains (1943)
- Western Cyclone (1943)
- Cattle Stampede (1943)
- The Renegade (1943)
- Blazing Frontier (1943)
- Devil Riders (1943)
- Frontier Outlaws (1944)
- Valley of Vengeance (1944)
- The Drifter (1944)
- Fuzzy Settles Down (1944)
- Rustlers' Hideout (1944)
- Wild Horse Phantom (1944)
- Oath of Vengeance (1944)
- His Brother's Ghost (1945)
- Thundering Gunslingers (1945)
- Shadows of Death (1945)
- Gangster's Den (1945)
- Stagecoach Outlaws (1945)
- Border Badmen (1945)
- Fighting Bill Carson (1945)
- Prairie Rustlers (1945)
- Lightning Raiders (1945)
- Terrors on Horseback (1946)
- Gentlemen with Guns (1946)
- Ghost of Hidden Valley (1946)
- Prairie Badmen (1946)
- Overland Riders (1946)
- Outlaws of the Plains (1946)
