= Rustlers' Hideout =

1945 film by Sam Newfield

- Theatrical release poster
- Directed by: Sam Newfield
- Written by: Joseph O'Donnell (original screenplay)
- Produced by: Sigmund Neufeld (producer)
- Starring: See below
- Cinematography: Jack Greenhalgh
- Edited by: Holbrook N. Todd
- Release date: September 2, 1944
- Running time: 60 minutes
- Country: United States
- Language: English

Rustlers' Hideout is a 1944 American Western film directed by Sam Newfield. In 1940 Crabbe had followed and replaced Bob Steele in the role of Billy the Kid in a series of B-Westerns. After 19 films as Billy, the character was renamed Billy Carson with seemingly no other changes to the series. He even kept his sidekick (Al St. John) from the "Kid" films. This was the 14th of the Carson series out of a total of 23 (1940-1946).

== Plot summary ==
Billy and Fuzzy lead a cattle drive and face a gang of ruthless rustlers who use gambling debts and poisoning water holes to stop Billy's herd.

== Cast ==
- Buster Crabbe as Billy Carson
- Al St. John as Fuzzy Jones
- Patti McCarty as Barbara Crockett
- Charles King as Buck Shaw
- John Merton as Harry Stanton
- Terry Frost as Jack Crockett
- Hal Price as Dave Crockett
- Lane Chandler as Gambler Hammond
- Al Ferguson as Henchman Steve
- Frank McCarroll as Henchman Squint
- Ed Cassidy as Sheriff
- Falcon as Billy's Horse

== See also ==
The "Billy the Kid" films starring Buster Crabbe:

- Billy the Kid Wanted (1941)
- Billy the Kid's Round-Up (1941)
- Billy the Kid Trapped (1942)
- Billy the Kid's Smoking Guns (1942)
- Law and Order (1942)
- Sheriff of Sage Valley (1942)
- The Mysterious Rider (1942)
- The Kid Rides Again (1943)
- Fugitive of the Plains (1943)
- Western Cyclone (1943)
- Cattle Stampede (1943)
- The Renegade (1943)
- Blazing Frontier (1943)
- Devil Riders (1943)
- Frontier Outlaws (1944)
- Valley of Vengeance (1944)
- The Drifter (1944)
- Fuzzy Settles Down (1944)
- Rustlers' Hideout (1944)
- Wild Horse Phantom (1944)
- Oath of Vengeance (1944)
- His Brother's Ghost (1945)
- Thundering Gunslingers (1945)
- Shadows of Death (1945)
- Gangster's Den (1945)
- Stagecoach Outlaws (1945)
- Border Badmen (1945)
- Fighting Bill Carson (1945)
- Prairie Rustlers (1945)
- Lightning Raiders (1945)
- Terrors on Horseback (1946)
- Gentlemen with Guns (1946)
- Ghost of Hidden Valley (1946)
- Prairie Badmen (1946)
- Overland Riders (1946)
- Outlaws of the Plains (1946)
