= Shadows of Death =

1945 film by Sam Newfield

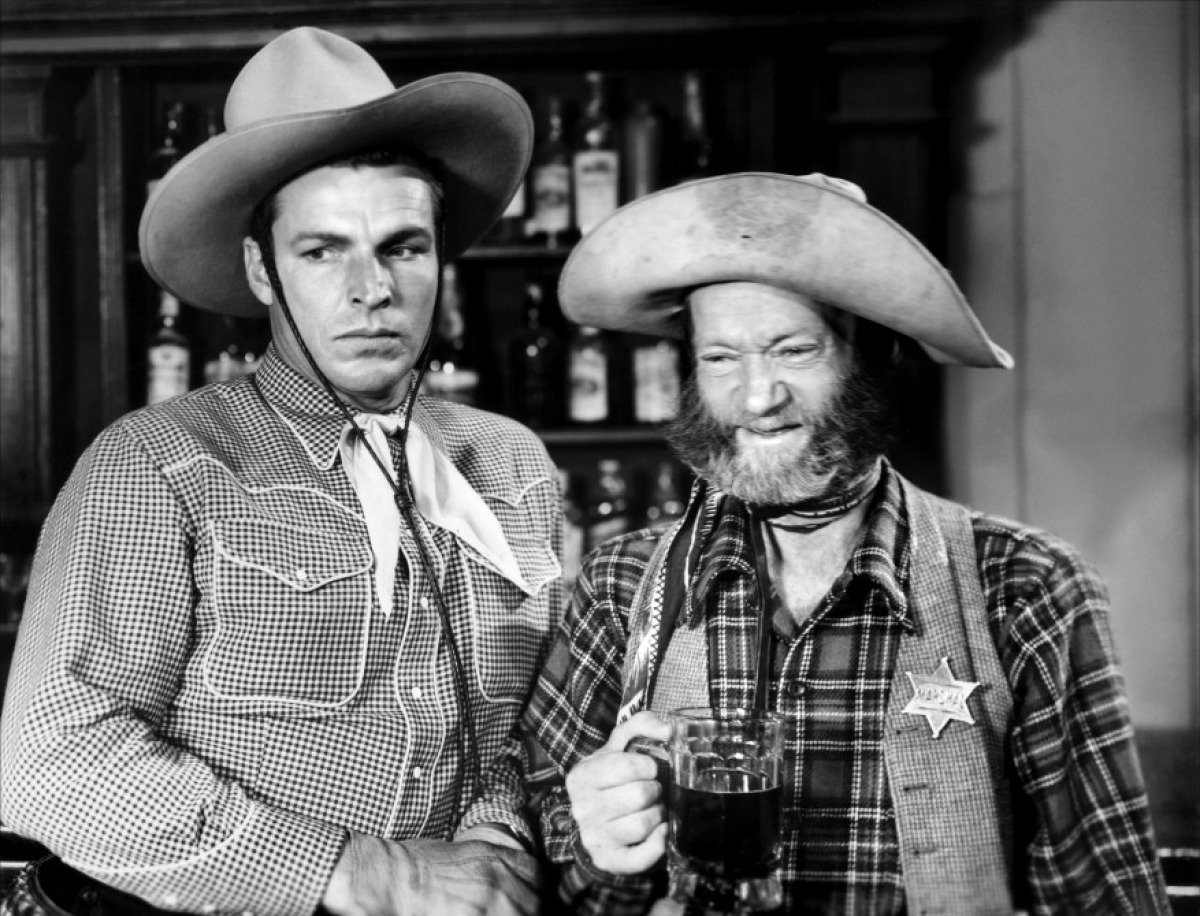
- Buster Crabbe (left) and Al St. John in the film
- Directed by: Sam Newfield
- Written by: Fred Myton (screenplay and story)
- Produced by: Sigmund Neufeld (producer)
- Starring: See below
- Cinematography: Jack Greenhalgh
- Edited by: Holbrook N. Todd
- Distributed by: Producers Releasing Corporation
- Release date: April 19, 1945
- Running time: 59 minutes; 64 minutes (UK DVD)
- Country: United States
- Language: English

Shadows of Death is a 1945 American Western film directed by Sam Newfield.

== Plot ==
Billy Carson tracks down the murderer of a man carrying news of the railroad traveling through the town of Red Rock, where Fuzzy Q. Jones is Justice of the Peace, town marshal, barber and horse doctor.

== Cast ==
- Buster Crabbe as Billy Carson
- Al St. John as Fuzzy Q. Jones
- Dona Dax as Babs Darcy
- Charles King as Steve Landreau (gang boss)
- Karl Hackett as Dave Hanlely (murder victim)
- Eddie Hall as Clay Kincaid
- Frank Ellis as Henchman Frisco
- John L. Cason as Henchman Butch

== See also ==
The "Billy the Kid" films starring Buster Crabbe:

- Billy the Kid Wanted (1941)
- Billy the Kid's Round-Up (1941)
- Billy the Kid Trapped (1942)
- Billy the Kid's Smoking Guns (1942)
- Law and Order (1942)
- Sheriff of Sage Valley (1942)
- The Mysterious Rider (1942)
- The Kid Rides Again (1943)
- Fugitive of the Plains (1943)
- Western Cyclone (1943)
- Cattle Stampede (1943)
- The Renegade (1943)
- Blazing Frontier (1943)
- Devil Riders (1943)
- Frontier Outlaws (1944)
- Valley of Vengeance (1944)
- The Drifter (1944)
- Fuzzy Settles Down (1944)
- Rustlers' Hideout (1944)
- Wild Horse Phantom (1944)
- Oath of Vengeance (1944)
- His Brother's Ghost (1945)
- Thundering Gunslingers (1945)
- Shadows of Death (1945)
- Gangster's Den (1945)
- Stagecoach Outlaws (1945)
- Border Badmen (1945)
- Fighting Bill Carson (1945)
- Prairie Rustlers (1945)
- Lightning Raiders (1945)
- Terrors on Horseback (1946)
- Gentlemen with Guns (1946)
- Ghost of Hidden Valley (1946)
- Prairie Badmen (1946)
- Overland Riders (1946)
- Outlaws of the Plains (1946)
