= Thundering Gun Slingers =

1944 film directed by Sam Newfield

- Theatrical release poster
- Directed by: Sam Newfield
- Screenplay by: Fred Myton
- Produced by: Sigmund Neufeld
- Starring: Buster Crabbe; Al St. John; Frances Gladwin; Charles King; Jack Ingram; Karl Hackett
- Cinematography: Robert E. Cline
- Edited by: Holbrook N. Todd
- Production company: Sigmund Neufeld Productions
- Distributed by: Producers Releasing Corporation
- Release date: March 25, 1944
- Running time: 59 minutes
- Country: United States
- Language: English

Thundering Gun Slingers is a 1944 American Western film directed by Sam Newfield and written by Fred Myton. The film stars Buster Crabbe, Al St. John, Frances Gladwin, Charles King, Jack Ingram and Karl Hackett. The film was released on March 25, 1944, by Producers Releasing Corporation.

== Plot ==
A man has been murdered. Lynched as a falsely accused cattle rustler. The man's nephew, Billy Carson (Buster Crabbe) comes looking for the murders, and finds Steve Kirby (Charles King) holding a forged claim on his uncle's ranch. When Kirby is confronted, he frames Carson for murder. As Carson is jailed, and Kirby incites a lynch mob, Carson's new friend, Doc Jones, arrives to even the odds.

== Cast ==
- Buster Crabbe as Billy Carson
- Al St. John as Doc Fuzzy Jones
- Frances Gladwin as Beth Halliday
- Charles King as Steve Kirby
- Jack Ingram as Vic Dawson
- Karl Hackett as Jeff Halliday
- Kermit Maynard as Ed Slade
- Budd Buster as Sheriff
- George Chesebro as Dave Carson
