= Outlaws of the Plains =

1946 film

- Directed by: Sam Newfield
- Written by: Elmer Clifton; A. Fredric Evans
- Produced by: Sigmund Neufeld
- Starring: Buster Crabbe; Al St. John; Patti McCarty
- Cinematography: Jack Greenhalgh
- Edited by: Holbrook N. Todd
- Music by: Lee Zahler
- Production company: Sigmund Neufeld Productions
- Distributed by: Producers Releasing Corporation
- Release date: September 22, 1946
- Running time: 56 minutes
- Country: United States
- Language: English

Outlaws of the Plains is a 1946 American Western film directed by Sam Newfield and starring Buster Crabbe, Al St. John and Patti McCarty.

== Cast ==
- Buster Crabbe as Billy Carson
- Al St. John as Fuzzy Q. Jones
- Patti McCarty as Kitty Reed
- Charles King as Nord Finner
- Karl Hackett as Henry Reed
- Jack O'Shea as Ralph Emory
- Bud Osborne as Sheriff
- Budd Buster as Tom Wilson
- Roy Brent as Townsman
- Slim Whitaker as Graham - Railroad Agent

== See also ==
The "Billy the Kid" films starring Buster Crabbe:

- Billy the Kid Wanted (1941)
- Billy the Kid's Round-Up (1941)
- Billy the Kid Trapped (1942)
- Billy the Kid's Smoking Guns (1942)
- Law and Order (1942)
- Sheriff of Sage Valley (1942)
- The Mysterious Rider (1942)
- The Kid Rides Again (1943)
- Fugitive of the Plains (1943)
- Western Cyclone (1943)
- Cattle Stampede (1943)
- The Renegade (1943)
- Blazing Frontier (1943)
- Devil Riders (1943)
- Frontier Outlaws (1944)
- Valley of Vengeance (1944)
- The Drifter (1944)
- Fuzzy Settles Down (1944)
- Rustlers' Hideout (1944)
- Wild Horse Phantom (1944)
- Oath of Vengeance (1944)
- His Brother's Ghost (1945)
- Thundering Gunslingers (1945)
- Shadows of Death (1945)
- Gangster's Den (1945)
- Stagecoach Outlaws (1945)
- Border Badmen (1945)
- Fighting Bill Carson (1945)
- Prairie Rustlers (1945)
- Lightning Raiders (1945)
- Terrors on Horseback (1946)
- Gentlemen with Guns (1946)
- Ghost of Hidden Valley (1946)
- Prairie Badmen (1946)
- Overland Riders (1946)
- Outlaws of the Plains (1946)

== Bibliography ==
- Jerry Vermilye. Buster Crabbe: A Biofilmography. McFarland, 2014.
