= Trails of the Wild =

1935 film

- Theatrical release poster
- Directed by: Sam Newfield
- Screenplay by: Joseph O'Donnell
- Based on: Caryl of the Mountains by James Oliver Curwood
- Produced by: Maurice Conn; Sigmund Neufeld
- Starring: Kermit Maynard; Billie Seward; Monte Blue; Matthew Betz; Fuzzy Knight; Wheeler Oakman
- Cinematography: Jack Greenhalgh
- Edited by: John English
- Production company: Conn Pictures Corporation
- Distributed by: Ambassador Pictures
- Release date: August 1, 1935
- Running time: 61 minutes
- Country: United States
- Language: English

Trails of the Wild is a 1935 American adventure film directed by Sam Newfield and written by Joseph O'Donnell. The film stars Kermit Maynard, Billie Seward, Monte Blue, Matthew Betz, Fuzzy Knight and Wheeler Oakman. The film was released on August 1, 1935, by Ambassador Pictures.

== Cast ==
- Kermit Maynard as Jim McKenna
- Billie Seward as Jane Madison
- Monte Blue as Larry Doyle
- Matthew Betz as Hunt
- Fuzzy Knight as Windy Cameron
- Wheeler Oakman as Hardy
- Robert Frazer as Bob Stacey
- Charles Delaney as John D. Brent
- Theodore von Eltz as Inspector Kincaid
- Frank Rice as Missouri
- John Elliott as Tom Madison
- Roger Williams as Buck Hammond
- Dick Curtis as Roper
