= The Wild Dakotas =

- Theatrical release poster
- Directed by: Sam Newfield
- Screenplay by: Tom W. Blackburn
- Produced by: Sigmund Neufeld
- Starring: Bill Williams; Coleen Gray; Jim Davis; John Litel; Dick Jones; John Miljan; Lisa Montell
- Cinematography: Kenneth Peach
- Edited by: Holbrook N. Todd
- Music by: Paul Dunlap
- Production company: Sigmund Neufeld Productions
- Distributed by: Associated Film Releasing Corporation
- Release date: February 28, 1956
- Running time: 73 minutes
- Country: United States
- Language: English

The Wild Dakotas is a 1956 American Western film directed by Sam Newfield and written by Tom W. Blackburn. The film stars Bill Williams, Coleen Gray, Jim Davis, John Litel, Dick Jones, John Miljan and Lisa Montell. The film was released on February 28, 1956, by Associated Film Releasing Corporation.

== Plot ==
A frontiersman tries to stop a Sioux Indian when they feel threatened by white settlers.

== Cast ==
- Bill Williams as Jim Henry
- Coleen Gray as Sue 'Lucky' Duneen
- Jim Davis as Aaron Baring
- John Litel as Morgan Wheeler
- Dick Jones as Mike McGeehee
- John Miljan as Chief Antelope
- Lisa Montell as Ruth Murphy
- I. Stanford Jolley as Tabor
- Wally Brown as McGraw
- Iron Eyes Cody as Red Rock
- Billy Dix as Wagon Scout
