= Roaring Six Guns =

1937 film directed by J. P. McGowan

- Theatrical release poster
- Directed by: J. P. McGowan
- Screenplay by: Arthur Everett
- Based on: His Fight by James Oliver Curwood
- Produced by: Maurice Conn
- Starring: Kermit Maynard; Mary Hayes; Sam Flint; John Merton; Budd Buster; Robert Fiske; Ed Cassidy
- Cinematography: Jack Greenhalgh
- Edited by: Richard G. Wray
- Production company: Conn Pictures Corporation
- Distributed by: Ambassador Pictures
- Release date: September 1, 1937
- Running time: 57 minutes
- Country: United States
- Language: English

Roaring Six Guns is a 1937 American Western film directed by J. P. McGowan and written by Arthur Everett. The film stars Kermit Maynard, Mary Hayes, Sam Flint, John Merton, Budd Buster, Robert Fiske and Ed Cassidy. The film was released on September 1, 1937, by Ambassador Pictures.

Roaring Six Guns is the last of Kermit Maynard's starring roles; he starred in 18 films for Ambassador Pictures from 1935 to 1937. After this movie, he resumed doing stunt work and acting in supporting roles.

== Cast ==
- Kermit Maynard as Buck Sinclair
- Mary Hayes as Beth Ringold
- Sam Flint as George Ringold
- John Merton as Mileaway Roberts
- Budd Buster as Wildcat Roper
- Robert Fiske as Jake Harmon
- Ed Cassidy as Commissioner
- Curley Dresden as Slug
- Dick Morehead as Bill
- Slim Whitaker as Skeeter
- Earle Hodgins as Sundown
