= Kermit Maynard =

American actor and stuntman (1897–1971)

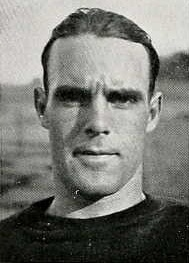
- Maynard from the 1922 Arbutus
- Born: September 20, 1897; Vevay, Indiana, United States
- Died: January 16, 1971 (aged 73); North Hollywood, Los Angeles, California, United States
- Resting place: Valhalla Memorial Park Cemetery
- Other name: Tex Maynard
- Occupations: Actor, stuntman
- Years active: 1927–1962
- Spouse: Edith Jessen (married 1924–1971, his death) 1 child

Kermit Maynard (September 20, 1897 – January 16, 1971) was an American actor and stuntman. He appeared in 280 films between 1927 and 1962.

== Early years ==
Born in Vevay, Indiana, he was the son of Mr. and Mrs. William Maynard and a lookalike younger brother of actor Ken Maynard; they were frequently assumed to be identical twins.

Maynard was a 1916 graduate of Columbus High School in Columbus, Indiana. He graduated with a degree in engineering from Indiana University and played college football as a lineman for the Indiana Hoosiers in the early 1920s. While at the university, he lettered in three sports in one year.

After he finished college, Maynard worked as a claims agent for the George H. Hormel Meat Packing Company. Maynard also competed as a rider in rodeo competition. In 1933, he won a Pacific Coast trick-riding championship in the Pendleton Round-Up. Early in his career, promoters disdained Maynard's given name of Kermit and marketed him as "Tex Maynard."

== Career ==
From 1935 to 1937, Kermit Maynard starred in films produced by Ambassador Pictures, which producer Maurice Conn established in 1934. He starred in 18 Ambassador films, the last one being Roaring Six Guns.

Unlike his more famous brother Ken Maynard, who was often argumentative and difficult to work with, the mild-mannered and more agreeable Kermit Maynard continued to work steadily in pictures, appearing in the supporting casts of dozens of westerns, serials, Hollywood features, and TV episodes through 1962. When producers would cast multiple cowboy stars in a single feature, Kermit Maynard joined the posse in Trail of Robin Hood and Once Upon a Horse.

== Death ==
On January 16, 1971, Maynard died at his home in North Hollywood, California, from a heart attack. He was 72 years old. Survivors included his wife and a son.

== Filmography ==
Film
Year	Title	Role	Notes
1927	Gun-Hand Garrison	Tex Maynard	
1930	The Lone Defender	Reverend Purdy	serial, uncredited
1931	The Phantom of the West	Peter Drake	serial
1933	The Wolf Dog	stunts	serial
1933	Drum Taps	Scoutmaster Earl Cartwright	
1934	Fighting Trooper	Burke	
1935	Red Blood of Courage	Jim Sullivan	
1935	Code of the Mounted	Corporal Jim Wilson	
1935	Wilderness Mail	Rance Raine / Keith Raine	
1935	Trails of the Wild	Jim McKenna	
1935	Northern Frontier	Mack MacKenzie	
1935	Timber War	Jim Dolan	
1936	Phantom Patrol	Jim Sullivan	
1936	Song of the Trail	Jim Carter	
1936	Wildcat Trooper	Gale Farrell	
1936	Wild Horse Round-Up	Jack Benson	
1937	Rough Riding Rhythm	Jim Langley	
1937	Valley of Terror	Bob Wilson	
1937	Roaring Six Guns	Buck Sinclair	
1937	Galloping Dynamite	Jim Dillon	
1937	Whistling Bullets	Larry Graham	
1937	The Fighting Texan	Glenn Oliver	
1938	The Great Adventures of Wild Bill Hickok	Kit Lawson	serial
1938	Western Jamboree	Ranch Hand Slim	
1939	The Night Riders	Sheriff Chuck Pratt	
1939	Colorado Sunset	Cyrus Drake	
1940	The Range Busters	Wyoming	
1940	The Showdown	Henchman Johnson	
1940	Pony Post	Whitmore	
1941	Billy the Kid	Thad Decker	
1941	Sierra Sue	Jarvis	
1941	Stick to Your Guns	Henchman Layton	
1941	Man from Montana	Chris	
1941	The Royal Mounted Patrol	Sgt. Coburn	
1941	Below the Border	Jeff	
1942	Rock River Renegades	Marshal Luke Graham	
1942	The Lone Prairie	Henchman with Large Hat	uncredited
1942	Perils of the Royal Mounted	Const. Collins	serial
1942	Texas Trouble Shooters	Pete	
1942	Arizona Stage Coach	Strike Cardigan	
1942	Trail Riders	Ace Alton	
1942	Sheriff of Sage Valley	Henchman Slim Jankins	
1942	The Mysterious Rider	Henchman Joe	
1942	Prairie Pals	Henchman Crandall	
1942	Home in Wyomin'	Sam Hatcher	Uncredited
1942	Along the Sundown Trail	Curly Morgan	
1942	Arabian Nights	Guard	Uncredited
1943	Western Cyclone	Ticklish Henchman Hank	
1943	Beyond the Last Frontier	Henchman Clyde Barton	
1943	Death Rides the Plains	Jed	
1943	Raiders of Red Gap	Bradley	
1943	Fugitive of the Plains	Henchman Spence	
1943	Blazing Frontier	Deputy Pete	
1943	Devil Riders	Henchman Red	
1943	The Blocked Trail	Henchman Reese	
1943	Santa Fe Scouts	Rancher Ben Henderson	
1943	The Texas Kid	Alex	
1943	The Stranger from Pecos	Bud Salem	
1944	Frontier Outlaws	Henchman Wallace	
1944	The Drifter	Jack	
1944	Wild Horse Phantom	Link Daggett	
1944	Oath of Vengeance	Ranch Foreman Red	
1944	Brand of the Devil	Gripper Joe	
1944	Thundering Gun Slingers	Ed Slade	
1944	Gunsmoke Mesa	Sam Sneed	
1945	Gangster's Den	Henchman Curt	
1945	Stagecoach Outlaws	Vic Dawson	
1945	Fighting Bill Carson	Cass	
1945	Prairie Rustlers	Vic	
1945	Jungle Raiders	Cragg	serial
1945	Enemy of the Law	Mike	
1946	Chick Carter, Detective	Williams, detective	serial, Chapter 11; Uncredited
1946	Terrors on Horseback	Wagner	
1946	Prairie Badmen	Lon	
1946	Badman's Territory	Carson	Uncredited
1946	Stars Over Texas	Henchman Knuckles	
1946	'Neath Canadian Skies	Stony Carter	
1946	Under Arizona Skies	Joe Forbes	
1946	Tumbleweed Trail	Bill Ryan	
1946	Ambush Trail	Walter Gordon	
1946	Galloping Thunder	Henchman Krag	
1947	The Law Comes to Gunsight	Jim	
1947	Ridin' Down the Trail	Allen	
1949	The Beautiful Blonde from Bashful Bend	Poker Game Onlooker	Uncredited
1949	Range Land	Shad Cook	
1950	The Traveling Saleswoman	Townsman	Uncredited
1950	Trail of Robin Hood	Himself	
1950	Law of the Panhandle	Luke Winslow	
1950	Silver Raiders	Hank Larkin	
1951	Fort Dodge Stampede	Wagon Train Scout	
1952	Rancho Notorious	Deputy in Gunsight	Uncredited
1952	The Black Lash	Lem Woodruff	
1953	The Charge at Feather River	Trooper Zebulon Poinsett	Uncredited
1954	Gunfighters of the Northwest	Mountie August	serial, Chapters 5–8, 14, 15; Uncredited
1955	Wichita	Man in Saloon	Uncredited
1956	Blazing the Overland Trail	Al	serial
1956	The Fastest Gun Alive	Silver Rapids Deputy	Uncredited
1956	Gunslinger	Barfly	
1957	The Phantom Stagecoach	Henchman	Uncredited
1958	Once Upon a Horse...	Himself	
1959	Good Day for a Hanging	Townsman	Uncredited
1960	Toby Tyler	Bit role	Uncredited
1960	Cimarron	Setter	
1961	Pocketful of Miracles	Newspaper Editor	Uncredited
1962	Birdman of Alcatraz	Alcatraz Captain of Guards	Uncredited
Television
Year	Title	Role	Notes
1950	The Lone Ranger	Sheriff Gilbert; Deputy Sheriff Sam	2 episodes
1951	Saturday Roundup	Different role each week	unknown episodes
1952	The Range Rider		In episode "Jimmy the Kid"
1952–1955	The Cisco Kid	various roles	9 episodes
1953	Death Valley Days	Boarding House Diner	1 episode
1956	The Adventures of Rin Tin Tin	Show Patron	1 episode
1956	Gunsmoke	Barfly	"Hack Prine" (S1E26)
1957	Tales of the Texas Rangers	Henchman	1 episode
1958	The Texan	Barfly	1 episode
1958	Sugarfoot	Townsman	2 episode
1958	The Californians	Horseman	1 episode
1959	The Life and Legend of Wyatt Earp	Outlaw	1 episode
1959	Hotel de Paree	Man at Saloon	1 episode
1960	Riverboat	Trooper	1 episode
1960	Bat Masterson	Bartender (uncredited)	S2E21 "Cattle and Canes"
1961	Outlaws	Juror	1 episode
1962	Tales of Wells Fargo	Townsman; Barfly	2 episodes, uncredited
1962	Gunsmoke	Prisoner & Bartender	2 episodes, uncredited
