= Milton Kibbee =

American actor (1896–1970)

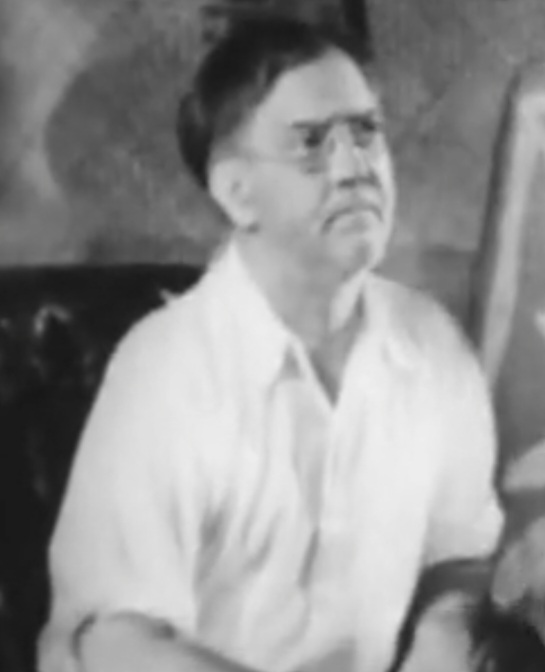
- Kibbee in Jungle Siren (1942)
- Born: Milne Bryan Kibbee; January 27, 1896; Roswell, New Mexico Territory, U.S.
- Died: April 17, 1970 (aged 74); Simi Valley, California, U.S.
- Resting place: Oakwood Memorial Park Cemetery, Chatsworth, California
- Occupation: Actor
- Years active: 1933–1953
- Spouse: Lois W. Kibbee
- Children: 2, including Lois Kibbee

Milton Kibbee (born Milne Bryan Kibbee; January 27, 1896 – April 17, 1970) was an American film actor. He appeared in more than 360 films between 1933 and 1953. He was the brother of actor Guy Kibbee and the father of actress Lois Kibbee.

== Biography ==
Kibbee was born in 1896 in Roswell, New Mexico. His father, James Kibbee, worked for newspapers in Las Cruces and El Paso. The Kibbee brothers operated a stock theater company in Wichita Falls, Texas, after which Milton and his family moved to Chicago, where they acted in stock productions and their children were educated. He signed a contract with Warner Bros. in 1932. He performed on television in Cavalcade of America. Kibbee and his wife also operated a stock company in Wheeling, West Virginia.

He died on April 17, 1970, in Simi Valley, California. His remains are interred at Oakwood Memorial Park Cemetery in Chatsworth, California.

== Partial filmography ==
- Central Airport (1933)
- College Coach (1933)
- Little Big Shot (1935) unbilled
- Moonlight on the Prairie (1935)
- Fugitive in the Sky (Unbilled) (1936)
- Bengal Tiger (1936)
- Murder by an Aristocrat (1936)
- Times Square Playboy (1936)
- Back in Circulation (1937)
- The Lady Escapes (1937)
- Smart Blonde (1937)
- The Gladiator (1938)
- Overland Stage Raiders (1938)
- The Roaring Twenties (1939) as a Cab Driver (uncredited)
- Mr. Smith Goes to Washington (1939) as a Reporter (uncredited)
- Strike Up the Band (1940) Mr. Holden
- That Gang of Mine (1940)
- Too Many Blondes (1941)
- The Lone Rider and the Bandit (1941)
- Across the Sierras (1941)
- Billy the Kid's Range War (1941)
- The Lone Rider in Cheyenne (1942)
- In Old California (1942)
- Saboteur (1942) - Man Killed in Movie Theater (uncredited)
- Billy the Kid Trapped (1942)
- Billy the Kid's Smoking Guns (1942)
- Western Cyclone (1943)
- Blazing Frontier (1943)
- Bowery to Broadway (1944)
- The Story of Dr. Wassell (1944)
- Johnny Doesn't Live Here Any More (1944)
- I Won't Play (1944)
- Three of a Kind (1944)
- Junior Prom (1946)
- Strange Holiday (1946)
- Daughter of the West (1949)
- County Fair (1950)
- Woman on the Run (1950)
- When the Redskins Rode (1951)
- The Whip Hand (1951)
