= Budd Buster =

American actor (1891–1965)

- Born: Leland Buster; June 14, 1891; Colorado Springs, Colorado, U.S.
- Died: December 22, 1965 (aged 74); Los Angeles, California, U.S.
- Occupation: Actor
- Years active: 1935–1960

Budd Leland Buster (June 14, 1891 – December 22, 1965), was an American actor known for B Western films. He was sometimes credited as Bud Buster, and as George Selk in his later work.

== Early life ==
Buster was born either Budd Leland Buster or Leland Buster near Colorado Springs, Colorado on June 14, 1891. His parents were John M. Buster and Anna (Annie) Moore Buster, both from Missouri. According to the 1900 census, the family resided in Colorado Springs, and included Buster's one year younger sister, Demple, and his paternal grandmother. By 1920, Buster was part-owner with his father of Colorado Springs Auto and Carriage Livery Company, lived in Ivywild, Colorado, and had two children, Mary Jane (4 years) and John (1 year) with his wife, Mary.

Buster had experience in vaudeville. Vaudeville provided experience with makeup, enabling Buster to appear as a wide variety of characters.

== Silent films ==
From 1909 to 1915, Buster acted in leading-man roles in silent films.

== B westerns ==
Buster appeared in 132 B western films. He was one of the most prolific character actors in B westerns, appearing as a wide variety of stock characters. Each year from 1935 to 1946, he was in 20 or more movies, with a peak of 32 movies in 1937. He appeared in 304 films in a career spanning from 1933 to 1960, excluding a hiatus from 1949 to 1952 coinciding with the decline of Poverty Row.

His final film appearance was a bit part in the major movie Guns of the Timberland in 1960.

=== Villains ===
Buster played the villain in Colorado Kid (1937) with Bob Steele, and a bank robber in Desert Justice (1936) with Jack Perrin. He was a rustler in Silent Valley (1935) with Tom Tyler, The Texas Marshal (1941) with Tim McCoy, Billy the Kid Trapped (1942) with Buster Crabbe, Man's Country (1938) with Jack Randall, and Overland Stagecoach (1942) with Bob Livingston. He was Nazi saboteur "Wilheim Werner" in the Range Busters episode Cowboy Commandos (1943), an underhanded foreman in Brand of the Devil (1944) with Dave O'Brien and James Newill, a crooked postmaster in Border Badmen (1945) with Buster Crabbe, and a crazy old miner with a haunted mine in Wild Horse Phantom (1944).

=== Sidekick ===
In Bob Steele's Cavalry (1936), Buster had the role of Steele's wagon boss sidekick, as well as Abraham Lincoln. Buster was sidekick to Tom Keene in Drums of Destiny (1937), to Bob Steele in Feud of the Range (1939) and to Jack Randall in Covered Wagon Trails (1940). Buster appeared in Westward Ho as "Henchman Coffee" in 1942. One of Buster's best roles was as the protector of the female lead "Belle Blaine" in Trail of Terror (1943) with Dave O'Brien and James Newill.

== Other media ==
In other film genres, Buster had minor roles in Bus Stop, a 1956 film, and the 1953 It Came from Outer Space.

Buster appeared in character for national billboard campaigns, including Studebaker and the then-popular Eastside Beer.

Two of his last roles were Buster's rare appearances in television westerns, Gene Autry: Outlaw Warning in 1954, and Buffalo Bill, Jr.: Black Ghost in 1955.

== Personal life ==
Buster's son, John L. Buster, acted in two mid-1940s Buster Crabbe westerns produced by PRC. He played henchman Steve in Fighting Bill Carson (1945), and sang and played guitar in Prairie Badmen (1946).

== Death ==
Buster died in Los Angeles from a heart attack at the age of 74 on December 22, 1965.

== Partial filmography ==
- Her Forgotten Past (1933)
- Western Racketeers (1934)
- Riddle Ranch (1935)
- Desert Guns (1936)
- Senor Jim (1936)
- Taming the Wild (1936)
- Desert Justice (1936)
- Cavalcade of the West (1936)
- Wild Horse Round-Up (1936)
- The Gambling Terror (1937)
- Raw Timber (1937)
- Under Strange Flags (1937)
- Roaring Six Guns (1937)
- Galloping Thunder (1937)
- The Fighting Texan (1937)
- The Feud Maker (1938)
- Frontier Scout (1938)
- Zorro's Fighting Legion (1939)
- Billy the Kid Outlawed (1940)
- West of Pinto Basin (1940)
- Covered Wagon Trails (1940)
- Gun Code (1940)
- The Lone Rider in Ghost Town (1941)
- The Lone Rider in Frontier Fury (1941)
- Secret Evidence (1941)
- Billy the Kid's Fighting Pals (1941)
- Billy the Kid Wanted (1941)
- Overland Stagecoach (1942)
- Thunder River Feud (1942)
- Boot Hill Bandits (1942)
- Texas to Bataan (1942)
- Billy the Kid Trapped (1942)
- Billy the Kid's Smoking Guns (1942)
- Wolves of the Range (1943)
- Young Ideas (1943)
- Haunted Ranch (1943)
- Cowboy Commandos (1943)
- Bullets and Saddles (1943)
- Cattle Stampede (1943)
- Call of the South Seas (1944)
- Saddle Leather Law (1944)
- Wild Horse Phantom (1944)
- Frontier Outlaws (1944)
- The White Gorilla (1945)
- Border Badmen (1945)
- Galloping Thunder (1946)
- Outlaws of the Plains (1946)
- West of the Alamo (1946)
- Terrors on Horseback (1946)
- Gentlemen with Guns (1946)
- Shadow Valley (1947)
- Rainbow Over the Rockies (1947)
- Valley of Fear (1947)
- The Wild Frontier (1947)
