= Western Pacific Agent =

1950 film by Sam Newfield

- Directed by: Sam Newfield
- Screenplay by: Fred Myton; Milton Raison (story)
- Produced by: Irving Kay and Sigmund Neufeld
- Cinematography: Ernest Miller
- Edited by: Carl Pierson
- Production company: Sigmund Neufeld Productions
- Distributed by: Lippert Pictures
- Release dates: March 17, 1950 (U.S. premiere); April 10, 1950
- Running time: 65 minutes
- Country: United States
- Language: English

Western Pacific Agent is a 1950 Sigmund Neufeld Productions crime drama directed by Sam Newfield and starring Kent Taylor, Sheila Ryan and Mickey Knox. The screenplay was written by Fred Myton based on a story by Milton Raison. It was released in West Germany as Jack der Killer.

== Plot ==
Detectives for the Western Pacific Railroad investigate several murders, including that of a railroad detective killed during a train robbery.

== Cast ==
- Kent Taylor as Rod Kendall
- Sheila Ryan as Martha Stuart
- Mickey Knox as Frank Wickens
- Morris Carnovsky as Joe 'Pop' Wickens
- Robert Lowery as Bill Stuart

== Other ==
Western Pacific Agent was the last Hollywood film in which communist actor Morris Carnovsky appeared before he was blacklisted.
