= Wild Horse Round-Up =

1936 film directed by Alan James

- Directed by: Alan James
- Written by: Joseph O'Donnell
- Based on: a short story by James Oliver Curwood
- Produced by: Maurice Conn; Martin G. Cohn
- Starring: Kermit Maynard; Betty Lloyd; Dickie Jones
- Cinematography: Arthur Reed
- Edited by: Richard G. Wray
- Production company: Conn Pictures
- Release date: November 20, 1936 (US)
- Running time: 58 minutes
- Country: United States
- Language: English

Wild Horse Round-Up is a 1936 American western film directed by Alan James from a screenplay by Joseph O'Donnell, based on a short story by James Oliver Curwood. The film stars Kermit Maynard, Betty Lloyd, and Dickie Jones.

== Cast ==
- Kermit Maynard as Jack Benson
- Betty Lloyd as Ruth Williams
- Dickie Jones as Dickie Williams
- John Merton as Charlie Doan
- Frank Hagney as Steve
- Roger Williams as Pete
- Dick Curtis as Bill
- Budd Buster as Mopey
