= Frank Ellis (actor) =

American actor (1897–1969)

- Born: February 26, 1897; Oklahoma, U.S.
- Died: February 23, 1969 (aged 71); Los Angeles, California, U.S.
- Occupation: Actor
- Years active: 1917–1954

Frank Birney Ellis (February 26, 1897 – February 23, 1969) was an American actor in silent and sound films and serials. He appeared in more than 480 films between 1917 and 1954. He was born in Oklahoma and died in Los Angeles, California. He appeared as a townsman in uncredited roles in the TV Western series Gunsmoke – S7E27's "Wagon Girls" (1962); and S9E8's "Carter Caper" (1963).

== Partial filmography ==
- When a Man Sees Red (1917)
- Elmo the Fearless (1920)
- Bringin' Home the Bacon (1924)
- The Outlaw Express (1926)
- The Desert Demon (1925)
- Ace of Action (1926)
- The Road Agent (1926)
- The Lost Trail (1926)
- Whispering Smith Rides (1927)
- The Valley of Hunted Men (1928)
- Yellow Contraband (1928)
- The Viking (1928)
- Two Tars (1928)
- Law of the Mounted (1928)
- Westward Bound (1930)
- Breed of the West (1930)
- Trails of Danger (1931)
- Quick Trigger Lee (1931)
- Forbidden Trail (1932)
- Treason (1933)
- Unknown Valley (1933)
- Lawless Range (1935)
- Riders of the Whistling Skull (1937)
- Two-Fisted Sheriff (1937)
- The Marshal of Mesa City (1939)
- Roll Wagons Roll (1940)
- Covered Wagon Trails (1940)
- The Lone Rider Crosses the Rio (1941)
- The Lone Rider in Frontier Fury (1941)
- The Lone Rider Fights Back (1941)
- The Kid's Last Ride (1941)
- Wrangler's Roost (1941)
- Billy the Kid in Santa Fe (1941)
- Billy the Kid Wanted (1941)
- Outlaws of Boulder Pass (1942)
- Thundering Hoofs (1942)
- Rock River Renegades (1942)
- Texas Trouble Shooters (1942)
- Arizona Stage Coach (1942)
- Texas to Bataan (1942)
- Billy the Kid's Smoking Guns (1942)
- Wild Horse Rustlers (1943)
- Law of the Saddle (1943)
- Raiders of Red Gap (1943)
- Two Fisted Justice (1943)
- Cowboy Commandos (1943)
- Black Market Rustlers (1943)
- Fugitive of the Plains (1943)
- Cattle Stampede (1943)
- Blazing Frontier (1943)
- The Underdog (1943)
- Wild Horse Phantom (1944)
- Oath of Vengeance (1944)
- Gun Smoke (1945)
- Shadows of Death (1945)
- Overland Riders (1946)
- Gentlemen with Guns (1946)
- Swing, Cowboy, Swing (1946)
- Prairie Badmen (1946)
- Out West (1947)
- Stage to Mesa City (1947)
- Deadline (1948)
- Mysterious Island (1951)
- Captain Video (1951)
- King of the Congo (1952)
- Son of Geronimo (1952)
- Pals and Gals (1954)
