= Karl Hackett =

American actor (1893–1948)

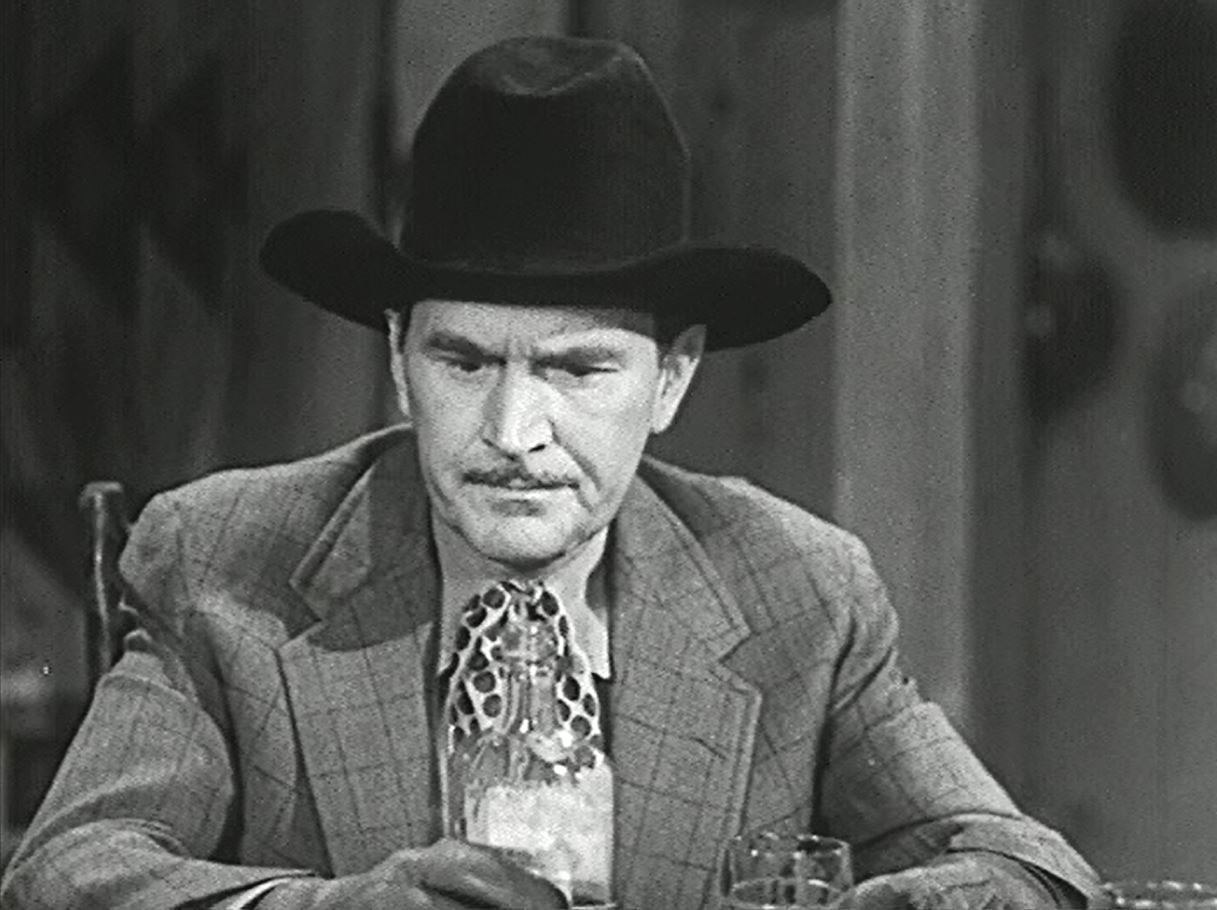
- Hackett in Western Mail (1942)
- Born: Carl Ellsworth Germain; September 5, 1893; Carthage, Missouri, U.S.
- Died: October 24, 1948 (aged 55); Los Angeles, California, U.S.
- Resting place: Los Angeles National Cemetery
- Occupation: Actor
- Years active: 1919–1947
- Spouse: Ruby Burnette Moore

Carl Ellsworth Germain (September 5, 1893 – October 24, 1948), known professionally as Karl Hackett, was an American actor. He served in the U.S. army during World War I. He was married to Ruby Burnette Moore.

On October 24, 1948, Hackett died from bronchopneumonia in Los Angeles, California, aged 55. He was buried at the Los Angeles National Cemetery.

== Selected filmography ==
List of acting performances in film
Year	Title	Role
1935	Bulldog Courage	Williams
1936	Aces and Eights	Wild Bill Hickok
1936	Desert Phantom	Tom Jackson
1936	The Public Pays	Markovitz
1936	Cavalry	Gavin Rance
1936	Lightnin' Bill Carson	Stack Stone
1936	Roarin' Guns	Evans
1936	The Traitor	Captain John Hughes
1937	Arizona Gunfighter	Rancher Durkin
1937	Sing, Cowboy, Sing	Kalmus
1937	Texas Trail	Mayor McCready
1937	Whistling Bullets	Dave Stone
1938	The Feud Maker	Rand Lassiter
1938	Lightning Carson Rides Again	Gray
1938	The Rangers' Round-Up	Hank
1938	Phantom Ranger	Sharpe
1938	Rollin' Plains	Dan Barrow
1938	Six-Gun Trail	Joe Willis
1938	Songs and Saddles	George Morrow
1938	The Utah Trail	Sheriff Clayton
1938	Where the Buffalo Roam	Three-Finger Rogell
1940	Billy the Kid's Gun Justice	Attorney Martin
1940	Take Me Back to Oklahoma	Storm
1941	Billy the Kid in Santa Fe	Bert Davis
1941	The Lone Rider Rides On	Judge Graham
1941	The Lone Rider in Frontier Fury	Matt Malone
1941	The Pioneers	Carson
1941	Billy the Kid's Range War	Williams
1942	The Lone Rider in Cheyenne	Mayor Dan Blodgett
1942	The Lone Rider in Texas Justice	Jack Stewart
1942	Outlaws of Boulder Pass	Sid Clayton
1942	Phantom Killer	Defense Attorney
1942	Western Mail	Jim Rivers
1942	Western Cyclone	Governor Jim Arnold
1942	Billy the Kid's Smoking Guns	Hart
1943	Fugitive of the Plains	Sam Packard
1943	Wild Horse Rustlers	The Sheriff
1943	Thundering Trails	Henchman Mollison
1943	Death Rides the Plains	Edward Simms
1943	Wolves of the Range	Bob Corrigan
1944	Brand of the Devil	Jeff Palin
1944	Oath of Vengeance	Dan Harper
1944	Arizona Whirlwind	Banker Steve Lynch
1945	His Brother's Ghost	Doc Packard
1945	Gangster's Den	Old Man Taylor
1945	Shadows of Death	Dave Hanley
1945	Prairie Rustlers	Dan Foster
1946	Lightning Raiders	Jim Murray
1946	Terrors on Horseback	Ed Sperling
1946	Gentlemen with Guns	Judge
1946	Ghost of Hidden Valley	Jed
1946	Outlaws of the Plains	Henry Reed
