= Hal Price =

American actor (1886–1964)

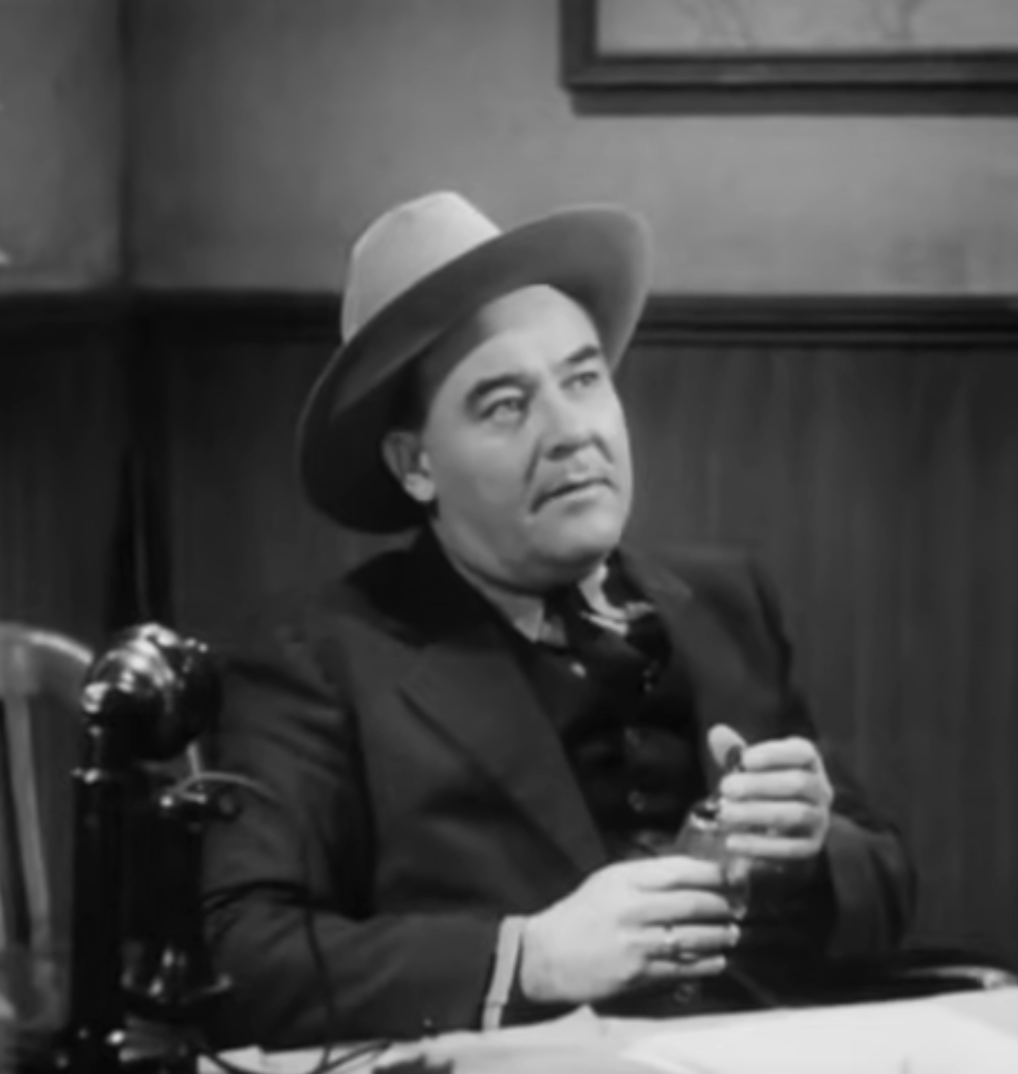
- Price in The Devil Bat (1940)
- Born: Harry Franklin Price; June 24, 1886; Wauseon, Ohio, U.S.
- Died: April 15, 1964 (aged 77); Los Angeles, California, U.S.
- Resting place: Forest Lawn Memorial Park, Glendale, California
- Occupation: Actor
- Years active: 1930–1952
- Spouses: Eleanor May Fitzsimmons (m. 1916; div. 1922) Amy F. Goodrich (m. 1923; died 1939): Josephine DeSimone (m. 19??)
- Children: 2

Harry Franklin "Hal" Price (June 24, 1886 – April 15, 1964) was an American film and stage actor. He appeared in more than 260 films between 1930 and 1952. He is the father of character actress and comedian Lu Leonard.

On stage, Price toured for three months with Will Rogers in a production of Ah, Wilderness!. He also performed with Leo Carrillo and William Gillette. He had the role of Willem in the Broadway production of The Red Mill (1945).

== Personal life ==
Price was born in Wauseon, Ohio, and died in Los Angeles, California, from arteriosclerosis. His daughter Mary Lou was an actress, known as Lu Leonard.

== Partial filmography ==
- Night Ride (1930)
- See America Thirst (1930)
- The Lawyer's Secret (1931)
- The Last Man (1932)
- Sin's Pay Day (1932)
- The Widow in Scarlet (1932)
- Lady and Gent (1932)
- This Sporting Age (1932)
- Vanity Street (1932)
- The Final Edition (1932)
- Ride Him, Cowboy (1932)
- Breed of the Border (1933)
- Galloping Romeo (1933)
- Riders of Destiny (1933)
- Sagebrush Trail (1933)
- Hell Bent for Love (1934)
- One in a Million (1934)
- Westward Ho (1935)
- Sea Spoilers (1936)
- The Fugitive Sheriff (1936)
- Born to Fight (1936)
- Melody of the Plains (1937)
- Valley of Terror (1937)
- Where Trails Divide (1937)
- Pioneer Trail (1938)
- Call the Mesquiteers (1938)
- Across the Plains (1939)
- The Night Riders (1939)
- Man from Texas (1939)
- Overland Mail (1939)
- New Frontier (1939)
- Billy the Kid Outlawed (1940)
- Lone Star Raiders (1940)
- Frontier Crusader (1940)
- Gangs of Sonora (1941)
- The Lone Rider Ambushed (1941)
- Billy the Kid in Santa Fe (1941)
- Raiders of the Range (1942)
- War Dogs (1942)
- Sheriff of Sage Valley (1942)
- The Blocked Trail (1943)
- Two Fisted Justice (1943)
- Fugitive of the Plains (1943)
- Western Cyclone (1943)
- Law Men (1944)
- Fuzzy Settles Down (1944)
- Harmony Trail (1944)
- Wild Horse Phantom (1944)
- Oath of Vengeance (1944)
- Rustlers' Hideout (1944)
- The Lone Ranger (1950 TV episode #21)
