= John Merton =

American actor (1901–1959)

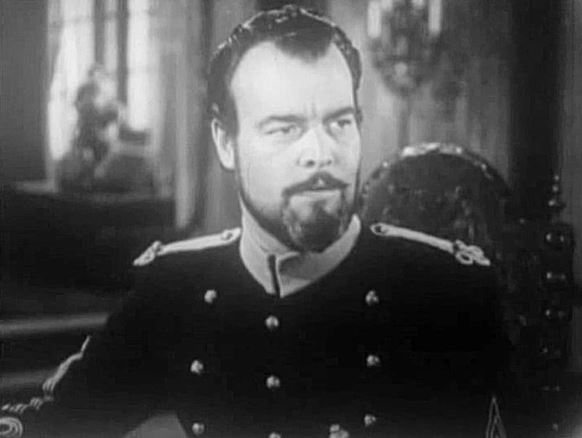
- Merton in Zorro's Fighting Legion (1939)
- Born: Myrtland F. LaVarre; February 18, 1901; Seattle, Washington, U.S.
- Died: September 19, 1959 (aged 58); Los Angeles, California, U.S.
- Occupation: Actor
- Years active: 1927–1959
- Spouse(s): Esther Anita Swarts (married 1921-1940); Ellen Margaret Curtan (married 1942, 1950)
- Children: 6

John Merton (born Myrtland F. LaVarre; February 18, 1901 – September 19, 1959) was an American film actor. He appeared in more than 250 films between 1927 and 1959, mostly as a villain. He was the brother of filmmakers André de la Varre and William LaVarre, the father of actor Lane Bradford, the grandfather of actress Diane Delano, and the great-uncle of academic Hollis Robbins.

== Biography ==
Merton was born in Seattle, Washington to naval shipbuilder William Johanne LaVarre and Leilia Goddin Hayes LaVarre, and raised in Washington, D.C. with three other brothers, Franklin, Claude, and William LaVarre. He enlisted in the U.S. Navy during World War I.

He joined the New York Theatre Guild in 1919 and appeared in a variety of shows, including playing the robot Marius in R.U.R. (1922). He made his film debut as a police officer in Running Wild (1927) filmed in Long Island's Astoria Studios. He travelled to Hollywood in 1932 and began a long career of small parts in major films and villain roles in B-movies and film serials. He met Cecil B. DeMille who cast him as a Roman guard in Cleopatra (1934) that led to him appearing in all of DeMille's films up to and including The Ten Commandments (1956). It was DeMille who suggested he change his name to a more masculine John Merton.

Merton's first wife, Esther Anita Swarts, whom he married in Manhattan, New York in 1921, sued him for divorce in 1940. They had six children. Merton married his second wife, Ellen Margaret Curtan, in Los Angeles in 1942 and remarried her in 1950 in Carson City, Nevada. Merton is the grandfather of actress Diane Delano; his daughter Gloria Mae (LaVarre) Delano is Diane Delano's mother.

== Selected filmography ==
- Knockout Reilly (1927)
- Beyond the Law (1934)
- Undersea Kingdom (1936)
- The Vigilantes Are Coming (1936)
- Law of the Range (1936)
- Border Caballero (1936)
- Lightnin' Bill Carson (1936)
- The Crooked Trail (1936)
- The Three Mesquiteers (1936)
- The Gun Ranger (1936)
- The Lion's Den (1936)
- Wildcat Trooper (1936)
- Headline Crasher (1936)
- Robin Hood, Jr. (1936)
- Wild Horse Round-Up (1936)
- Slaves in Bondage (1937)
- Gunsmoke Ranch (1937)
- The Law Commands (1937)
- Range Defenders (1937)
- Arizona Gunfighter (1937)
- Valley of Terror (1937)
- Roaring Six Guns (1937)
- Galloping Dynamite (1937)
- The Lone Ranger (1938)
- Dick Tracy Returns (1938)
- Gang Bullets (1938)
- Songs and Saddles (1938)
- Phantom Ranger (1938)
- Where the Buffalo Roam (1938)
- Female Fugitive (1938)
- Two Gun Justice (1938)
- Zorro's Fighting Legion (1939, serial)
- The Great Commandment (1939)
- Two Gun Troubador (1939)
- Drums of Fu Manchu (1940)
- Billy the Kid Outlawed (1940)
- Billy the Kid in Texas (1940)
- Covered Wagon Days (1940)
- Frontier Crusader (1940)
- The Trail Blazers (1940)
- Lone Star Raiders (1940)
- White Eagle (1941)
- Radar Patrol vs. Spy King (1942)
- Prairie Pals (1942)
- Boot Hill Bandits (1942)
- Sheriff of Sage Valley (1942)
- The Mysterious Rider (1942)
- Billy the Kid's Smoking Guns (1942)
- Devil Riders (1943)
- The Law Rides Again (1943)
- Fugitive of the Plains (1943)
- Black Market Rustlers (1943)
- Land of Hunted Men (1943)
- Cowboy Commandos (1943)
- Zorro's Black Whip (1944)
- Ghost Guns (1944)
- Fuzzy Settles Down (1944)
- Valley of Vengeance (1944)
- Rustlers' Hideout (1944)
- Brenda Starr, Reporter (1945)
- The Cherokee Flash (1945)
- Flame of the West (1945)
- Hop Harrigan (1946)
- Son of the Guardsman (1946)
- Galloping Thunder (1946)
- The Gay Cavalier (1946)
- Brick Bradford (1947, Serial)
- Raiders of the South (1947)
- Adventures of Sir Galahad (1949)
- The Blazing Trail (1949)
- Haunted Trails (1949)
- A Snitch in Time (1950)
- The Bandit Queen (1950)
- Gold Raiders (1951)
- Up in Daisy's Penthouse (1953)
- The Ten Commandments (1956)
- Omar Khayyam (1956)
