= Law and Order (1942 film) =

1942 film by Sam Newfield

- Theatrical release poster
- Directed by: Sam Newfield
- Screenplay by: Sam Robins
- Produced by: Sigmund Neufeld
- Starring: Buster Crabbe; Al St. John; Dave O'Brien; Sarah Padden; Wanda McKay; Charles King
- Cinematography: Jack Greenhalgh
- Edited by: Holbrook N. Todd
- Production company: Sigmund Neufeld Productions
- Distributed by: Producers Releasing Corporation
- Release date: August 21, 1942
- Running time: 57 minutes
- Country: United States
- Language: English

Law and Order is a 1942 American Western film directed by Sam Newfield and written by Sam Robins. The film stars Buster Crabbe, Al St. John, Dave O'Brien, Sarah Padden, Wanda McKay and Charles King. The film was released on August 21, 1942, by Producers Releasing Corporation.

== Plot summary ==
Law and Order opens with Billy the Kid and his friends Jeff Travis and Fuzzy Jones being taken to Fort Culver. Billy is surprised to see that he looks just like the commander, Lt. Ted Morrison. When he learns about a plan to cheat Aunt Mary Todd, he and his friends break out and head to her ranch.

== Cast ==
- Buster Crabbe as Billy the Kid / Lt. Ted Morrison
- Al St. John as Fuzzy Jones
- Dave O'Brien as Jeff
- Sarah Padden as Aunt Mary Todd
- Wanda McKay as Linda Fremont
- Charles King as Mil Crawford
- Hal Price as Simms
- John Merton as Turtle
- Kenne Duncan as Durgan
- Ted Adams as Sheriff Jeff
