= Jack Greenhalgh =

American cinematographer (1904–1971)

- Born: Jack Greenhalgh; July 23, 1904; Manhattan, New York City, U.S.
- Died: September 3, 1971 (aged 67); North Hollywood, California
- Occupation: Cinematographer
- Years active: 1926 – 1953

Jack Greenhalgh (July 23, 1904 – September 3, 1971) was an American cinematographer, part of the Classical Hollywood cinema generation. He shot Billy the Kid in Santa Fe (1941), Gangster's Den (1945), Too Many Winners (1947) among others. He was active from 1926-53.

== Selected filmography ==
- His Fighting Blood (1935)
- The Lion's Den (1936)
- Everyman's Law (1936)
- The Traitor (1936)
- Two Gun Justice (1938)
- The Invisible Killer (1939)
- Hitler – Beast of Berlin (1939)
- Torture Ship (1939)
- Gun Code (1940)
- Secrets of a Model (1940)
- Frontier Crusader (1940)
- The Lone Rider Fights Back (1941)
- Enemy of the Law (1945)
- Outlaws of the Plains (1946)
- Lady at Midnight (1948)
- Savage Drums (1951)
- Rogue River (1951)
- Robot Monster (1953)
