= Sheriff of Sage Valley =

1942 film by Sam Newfield

- Theatrical release poster
- Directed by: Sam Newfield
- Written by: George Wallace Sayre (original screenplay); Milton Raison (original screenplay)
- Produced by: Sigmund Neufeld (producer)
- Starring: See below
- Cinematography: Jack Greenhalgh
- Edited by: Holbrook N. Todd
- Distributed by: Producers Releasing Corporation
- Release date: September 2, 1942
- Running time: 57 minutes
- Country: United States
- Language: English

Sheriff of Sage Valley is a 1942 American Western film directed by Sam Newfield.

== Plot ==
Billy, Fuzzy and Jeff interrupt a stagecoach robbery and discover that one of the passengers, the sheriff of Sage Valley was shot in the back by one of the other passengers. Upon arrival in Sage Valley Mayor Jed Harrison appoints Billy Sheriff to arrest the criminal mastermind Kansas Ed that turns out to be Billy's long lost brother.

== Cast ==
- Buster Crabbe as Billy the Kid / Kansas Ed Bonney
- Al St. John as Fuzzy
- Dave O'Brien as Jeff
- Maxine Leslie as Janet Morley – Casino Singer
- Charles King as Sloane, Casino Proprietor
- John Merton as Nick Gaynor – Kansas Henchman
- Kermit Maynard as Henchman Slim Jankins
- Hal Price as Mayor Jed Harrison

== Production ==
=== Historical inaccuracies ===
This film takes a significant amount of poetic license with historical fact. Billy the Kid was never a hero made sheriff, and he did not have a twin brother.

== Reception ==
In its December 9, 1942 edition, Variety noted that this low budget indie film "ranks with the best in the field".

== Soundtrack ==
- Maxine Leslie – "The Man Who Broke My Heart" (Written by Johnny Lange and Lew Porter)
