= Prairie Rustlers =

1945 film by Sam Newfield

- Theatrical release poster
- Directed by: Sam Newfield
- Screenplay by: Fred Myton
- Produced by: Sigmund Neufeld
- Starring: Buster Crabbe; Al St. John; Evelyn Finley; Karl Hackett; I. Stanford Jolley; Bud Osborne
- Cinematography: Jack Greenhalgh
- Edited by: Holbrook N. Todd
- Production company: Sigmund Neufeld Productions
- Distributed by: Producers Releasing Corporation
- Release date: November 7, 1945
- Running time: 56 minutes
- Country: United States
- Language: English

Prairie Rustlers is a 1945 American Western film directed by Sam Newfield and written by Fred Myton. The film stars Buster Crabbe, Al St. John, Evelyn Finley, Karl Hackett, I. Stanford Jolley and Bud Osborne. The film was released on November 7, 1945, by Producers Releasing Corporation.

== Cast ==
- Buster Crabbe as Billy Carson / Jim Slade
- Al St. John as Fuzzy Jones
- Evelyn Finley as Helen Foster
- Karl Hackett as Dan Foster
- I. Stanford Jolley as Matt
- Bud Osborne as Bart
- Kermit Maynard as Vic
