= Sigmund Neufeld =

American film producer

- Born: May 3, 1896; New York City, United States
- Died: March 21, 1979 (aged 82); Los Angeles, California, United States
- Occupation: Producer
- Years active: 1930–1957 (film)
- Children: Sigmund Neufeld Jr.

Sigmund Neufeld (May 3, 1896 – March 21, 1979) was an American B movie producer. He spent many years at Poverty Row studio Producers Releasing Corporation where he mainly produced films directed by his brother Sam Newfield. When PRC was taken over by Eagle-Lion Films in 1947 they both left the company. Eagle-Lion had goals of making bigger, more ambitious movies, a change in strategy that Sigmund deemed to be a financial mistake. During the following years he and his brother made several films for Film Classics. When this company also merged with Eagle-Lion in 1950 they both moved to Lippert Pictures.

His son, Sigmund Neufeld Jr. was a director, mainly of TV Series and TV Movies.

== Selected filmography ==
- Exposure (1932)
- Discarded Lovers (1932)
- Shop Angel (1932)
- Red-Haired Alibi (1932)
- Daring Daughters (1933)
- Big Time or Bust (1933)
- Reform Girl (1933)
- The Important Witness (1933)
- Marrying Widows (1934)
- Beggar's Holiday (1934)
- Bulldog Courage (1935)
- Red Blood of Courage (1935)
- Northern Frontier (1935)
- Timber War (1935)
- His Fighting Blood (1935)
- Aces and Eights (1936)
- Ghost Patrol (1936)
- Border Caballero (1936)
- The Lion's Den (1936)
- Lightnin' Bill Carson (1936)
- The Traitor (1936)
- Crashing Through Danger (1938)
- Torture Ship (1939)
- The Invisible Killer (1939)
- Marked Men (1940)
- Riders of Black Mountain (1940)
- I Take This Oath (1940)
- Gun Code (1940)
- Frontier Crusader (1940)
- Outlaws of Boulder Pass (1942)
- The Mad Monster (1942)
- Dead Men Walk (1943)
- The Black Raven (1943)
- The Monster Maker (1944)
- Oath of Vengeance (1944)
- Apology for Murder (1945)
- Rustlers' Hideout (1945)
- Shadows of Death (1945)
- White Pongo (1945)
- His Brother's Ghost (1945)
- Gas House Kids (1946)
- Lady Chaser (1946)
- Outlaws of the Plains (1946)
- Three on a Ticket (1947)
- Money Madness (1948)
- Miraculous Journey (1948)
- State Department: File 649 (1949)
- Western Pacific Agent (1950)
- Hi-Jacked (1950)
- Fingerprints Don't Lie (1951)
- Sky High (1951)
- Three Desperate Men (1951)
- Leave It to the Marines (1951)
- Lost Continent (1951)
- Mask of the Dragon (1951)
- Sins of Jezebel (1953)
- Last of the Desperados (1955)
- The Wild Dakotas (1956)
- The Three Outlaws (1956)
- Frontier Gambler (1956)
