= Holbrook N. Todd =

American film editor

- Born: February 10, 1906; New York, United States
- Died: August 7, 1972; Los Angeles, California, United States
- Occupation: Film editor

Holbrook N. Todd (February 10, 1906 - August 7, 1972) was an American film editor. Todd was the editor for 172 films and television shows from a career that lasted from 1933 to 1957.

== Selected filmography ==
- Ticket to a Crime (1934)
- Gun Play (1935)
- Danger Trails (1935)
- The Lion's Den (1936)
- Nation Aflame (1937)
- Damaged Goods (1937)
- The Headleys at Home (1938)
- The Invisible Killer (1939)
- The Devil Bat (1940)
- Frontier Crusader (1940)
- Gun Code (1940)
- Blonde Comet (1941)
- The Mad Monster (1942)
- Dead Men Walk (1943)
- Harvest Melody (1943)
- The Monster Maker (1944)
- Thundering Gun Slingers (1944)
- Gas House Kids (1946)
- Outlaws of the Plains (1946)
