= Sam Newfield =

American film director (1899–1964)

- Born: Samuel Neufeld; December 6, 1899; New York City
- Died: November 10, 1964 (aged 64); Los Angeles, California
- Other names: Sherman Scott, Peter Stewart
- Occupation: Director
- Years active: 1923–1958
- Employer: mainly PRC
- Known for: "America's most prolific sound film director"
- Spouse: Violet Newfield
- Children: 2

Sam Newfield (born Samuel Neufeld; December 6, 1899 – November 10, 1964), also known as Sherman Scott or Peter Stewart, was an American film director. He directed over 250 feature films from the silent era until 1958. He also directed one- and two-reel comedy shorts, training films, industrial films and TV episodes. He would sometimes direct more than 20 films in a single year—he has been called the most prolific director of the sound era.

Many of Newfield's films were made for PRC Pictures, a film production company headed by his brother Sigmund Neufeld. The films PRC produced were low-budget productions, the majority being westerns, with occasional horror films or crime drama.

Newfield died from liver cancer on November 10, 1964.

== Family and education ==
Newfield completed one year of high school, according to the 1940 US census. His brother Morris Neufeld was a stage actor, according to the 1930 US census.

== Pseudonyms ==
Sam Newfield was credited as Sherman Scott and Peter Stewart on a number of films he made for the PRC. He used these names in order to hide the fact that one person was responsible for so many of PRC's films.

== Partial filmography ==
Partial filmography is listed below for the different names he used.

=== As Sam Newfield ===
- Big Time or Bust (1933)
- Reform Girl (1933)
- Under Secret Orders (1933)
- The Important Witness (1933)
- Beggar's Holiday (1934)
- Undercover Men (1934)
- Marrying Widows (1934)
- Bulldog Courage (1935)
- Racing Luck (1935)
- Timber War (1935)
- The Traitor (1936)
- The Lion's Den (1936)
- The Fighting Deputy (1937)
- The Gambling Terror (1937)
- Trail of Vengeance (1937)
- The Feud Maker (1938)
- The Terror of Tiny Town (1938)
- Six-Gun Trail (1938)
- The Invisible Killer (1939)
- The Fighting Renegade (1939)
- Frontier Crusader (1940)
- Marked Men (1940)
- Secrets of a Model (1940)
- Texas Renegades (1940)
- The Mad Monster (1942)
- Tiger Fangs (1943)
- The Black Raven (1943)
- I Accuse My Parents (1944)
- Swing Hostess (1944)
- The Monster Maker (1944)
- His Brother's Ghost (1945)
- Shadows of Death (1945)
- The Lady Confesses (1945)
- Rustlers' Hideout (1945)
- Apology for Murder (1945)
- White Pongo (1945)
- Gas House Kids (1946)
- Fight That Ghost (1946)
- House-Rent Party (film) (1946)
- Outlaws of the Plains (1946)
- Jungle Flight (1947)
- Money Madness (1948)
- Western Pacific Agent (1950)
- Skipalong Rosenbloom (1951)
- Lost Continent (1951)
- Lady in the Fog (aka Scotland Yard Inspector) (1952)
- The Gambler and the Lady (1952)
- Outlaw Women (1952)
- Thunder over Sangoland (1955)
- The Wild Dakotas (1956)
- The Three Outlaws (1956)
- Frontier Gambler (1956)
- Last of the Desperadoes (1956)
- Wolf Dog (1958)
- Flaming Frontier (1958)

=== As Sherman Scott ===
- Hitler, Beast of Berlin (1939)
- I Take This Oath (1940)
- Billy the Kid's Gun Justice (1940)
- Billy the Kid's Fighting Pals (1941)
- Billy the Kid's Smoking Guns (1942)
- The Flying Serpent (1946)
- Lady at Midnight (1948)
- The Strange Mrs. Crane (1948)
- The Wild Weed (1949)

=== As Peter Stewart ===
- Gun Code (1940)
- Black Mountain Stage (1940)
- Adventure Island (1947)
- The Counterfeiters (1948)
- State Department: File 649 (1949)

=== Film statistics ===
Between 1923 and 1930 Newfield directed over 50 comedies. Feature films statistics per year, starting with 1933, are summarised in the following table.

1933	1934	1935	1936	1937	1938	1939	1940	1941	1942	1943	1944	1945
3	4	7	14	17	15	13	14	13	19	18	12	12
1946	1947	1948	1949	1950	1951	1952	1953	1954	1955	1956	1957	1958
15	3	5	2	4	8	3	0	1	1	3	1	1

== See also ==
- Fred Olen Ray, another film prolific director who has used the pseudonyms "Sherman Scott", "Peter Stewart" ... and "Sam Newfield"
