= Al St. John filmography =

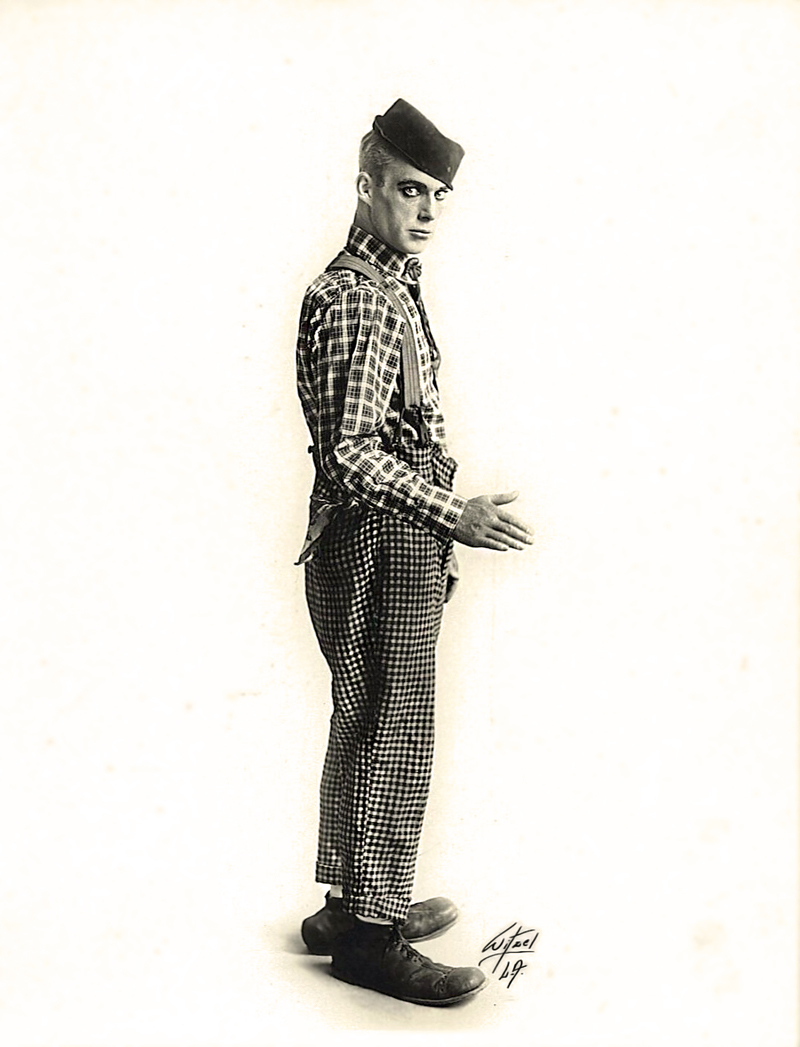
Al St. John studio portrait, 1920

Al St. John (1893–1963) was an American comic actor who appeared in 394 films between 1913 and 1952. Starting at Mack Sennett's Keystone Film Company, St. John rose through the ranks to become one of the major comedy stars of the 1920s, though less than half of his starring roles still survive today. With the advent of sound drastically changing and curtailing the two-reel comedy format, St. John diversified, creating a second career for himself as a comic sidekick in Western films and ultimately developing the character of "Fuzzy Q. Jones", for which he is best known in posterity.

== Starring St. John ==
St. John's first starring roles were made at Keystone, but most of these were made at the very end of the history of the company, just as Mack Sennett was abandoning the "Keystone" moniker in order to extricate himself from the Triangle Film Corporation partnership. St. John got a second chance at solo stardom starting in 1919 with Paramount Pictures and the early Warner Bros. studio, and this led to extended series of 2-reel comedies for Fox Film Corporation and Educational Pictures. Al St. John starred in more than 70 2-reel comedies through 1932. This is the most important part of his personal legacy, but it remains the least accessible part of his activity. Changes to this list are inevitable, and are welcomed.

Title	Release date	Director	Support Cast	Silent/Sound	Studio	Distributor	Status	Ref
Shot in the Excitement	1914-10-26	Unknown	Alice Howell	silent	Keystone	Mutual	Extant	LoC
The Moonshiners	1916-5-14	Roscoe Arbuckle	Alice Lake	silent	Keystone	Triangle	Extant	Fragment at LoC
The Stone Age	1917-1-9	Ferris Hartman	Vera Reynolds	silent	Keystone	Triangle	Lost	
The Grab Bag Bride	1917-1-28	Ferris Hartman	Vera Reynolds	silent	Keystone	Triangle	Extant	LoC
A Winning Loser	1917-2	Ferris Hartman	Rose Pomeroy	silent	Keystone	Triangle	Lost	
A Self-Made Hero	1917	Ferris Hartman	Mary Thurman	silent	Keystone	Triangle	Extant	GEH
Speed	1919-11-30	Al St. John		silent	Warner Bros.	Paramount	Lost	
Cleaning Up	1920-3-28	Al St. John		silent	Paramount	Paramount	Lost	
She Loves Me, She Loves Me Not	1920-11-29	Al St. John	Polly Moran	silent	Sunshine Comedies	Fox	Lost	
The Aero-Nut	1920	Unknown		silent	Warner Bros.	Paramount	Extant	Fragment
Fired Again	1920	Al St. John		silent	Warner Bros.	Paramount	Extant	LoC Fragment
The Slicker	1921-1-3	Al St. John	Polly Moran	silent	Sunshine Comedies	Fox	Lost	
The Simp	1921-3-13	Al St. John		silent	Sunshine Comedies	Fox	Lost	
The Big Secret	1921-3-27	Ferris Hartman	Larry Bowes	silent	Sunshine Comedies	Fox	Lost	
The Hayseed	1921-6-5	Ferris Hartman	Alice Davenport	silent	Sunshine Comedies	Fox	Lost	
Ain't Love Grand?	1921-8-14	Al St. John	Hilliard Karr	silent	Sunshine Comedies	Fox	Lost	
Small Town Stuff	1921-9-2	Al St. John		silent	Sunshine Comedies	Fox	Lost	
The Book Agent	1921-9-25	Unknown	Claire Sedgwick	silent	Sunshine Comedies	Fox	Lost	
Fast and Furious	1921-10-2	Gilbert Pratt		silent	Sunshine Comedies	Fox	Lost	
The Happy Pest	1921-11-9	Ferris Hartman		silent	Sunshine Comedies	Fox	Lost	
Fool Days	1921-12-12	Gilbert Pratt		silent	Sunshine Comedies	Fox	Extant	Fragment
The Paper Hanger	1921	Herman C. Raymaker	Cliff Bowes	silent	Warner Bros.		Extant	MOMA, Blackhawk Films
Three Good Pals	1921	Nate Watt	Billy Bowes	silent	Sunshine Comedies	Fox	Lost	
Straight from the Farm	1922-2-5	Gilbert Pratt		silent	Sunshine Comedies	Fox	Lost	
A Studio Rube	1922-3-19	Gilbert Pratt		silent	Sunshine Comedies	Fox	Extant	MOMA
Special Delivery	1922-4-30	Roscoe Arbuckle		silent	Sunshine Comedies	Fox	Extant	MOMA
The Village Sheik	1922-6-4	Al St. John		silent	Sunshine Comedies	Fox	Lost	
All Wet	1922-9-3	Al St. John	Otto Fries	silent	Sunshine Comedies	Fox	Extant	MOMA
The City Chap	1922-10-15	Al St. John		silent	Sunshine Comedies	Fox	Lost	
Out of Place	1922-11-19	Al St. John		silent	Sunshine Comedies	Fox	Extant	LoC, EYE Film Institute, the Netherlands
The Alarm	1922-12-17	Al St. John		silent	Sunshine Comedies	Fox	Lost	
Young and Dumb	1923-1-28	Al St. John		silent	Sunshine Comedies	Fox	Lost	
The Salesman	1923-3-11	Al St. John		silent	Sunshine Comedies	Fox	Lost	
The Author	1923-4-29	Al St. John		silent	Sunshine Comedies	Fox	Lost	
A Tropical Romeo	1923-1-17	Al St. John		silent	Sunshine Comedies	Fox	Lost	
The Tailor	1923-8-26	Al St. John	Victoria Louise Kerner	silent	Sunshine Comedies	Fox	Lost	
Full Speed Ahead	1923-9-30	Al St. John		silent	Sunshine Comedies	Fox	Lost	
Slow and Sure	1923-11-18	Al St. John		silent	Sunshine Comedies	Fox	Lost	
Spring Fever	1923-12-30	Archie Mayo	Jean Arthur	silent	Sunshine Comedies	Fox	Lost	
Highly Recommended	1924-1-6	Al St. John		silent	Sunshine Comedies	Fox	Lost	
Be Yourself	1924-2-10	Al St. John		silent	Sunshine Comedies	Fox	Lost	
His Bitter Half	1924-6-15	Al St. John		silent	Sunshine Comedies	Fox	Lost	
His First Car	1924-7-27	Al St. John	Doris Deane	silent	Tuxedo Comedies	Educational	Extant	
Never Again	1924-8-24	Al St. John	Carmencita Johnson	silent	Tuxedo Comedies	Educational	Extant	Lobster Films, 1 reel
Stupid, But Brave	1924-10-26	Roscoe Arbuckle		silent	Tuxedo Comedies	Educational	Extant	MOMA
Lovemania	1924-12-28	Al St. John	Doris Deane	silent	Tuxedo Comedies	Educational	Extant	Discovered in Europe
Rapid Transit	1925-3-10	Al St. John		silent	Tuxedo Comedies	Educational	Lost	
Red Pepper	1925-4-5	Arvid E. Gillstrom	Judy King	silent	Mermaid Comedies	Educational	Extant	MOMA
The Iron Mule	1925-4-12	Roscoe Arbuckle, Grover Jones	George Davis	silent	Tuxedo Comedies	Educational	Extant	MOMA, DVD, Blackhawk Films
Dynamite Doggie	1925-5-9	Roscoe Arbuckle, Grover Jones		silent	Tuxedo Comedies	Educational	Extant	
Fares, Please!	1925-5-10	Stephen Roberts		silent	Mermaid Comedies	Educational	Lost	
Curses!	1925-5-17	Roscoe Arbuckle, Grover Jones	Bartine Burkett	silent	Tuxedo Comedies	Educational	Extant	DVD
Dumb and Daffy	1925-6-5	Al St. John		silent	Sunshine Comedies	Fox	Lost	
The Live Agent	1925-8-10	Al St. John	Bartine Burkett	silent	Biff Comedies	Bischoff	Extant	
Fair Warning	1925-9-27	Stephen Roberts	Virginia Vance	silent	Mermaid Comedies	Educational	Extant	MOMA
Fire Away	1925-11-8	Stephen Roberts	Lucille Hutton	silent	Mermaid Comedies	Educational	Extant	Bundesarchiv
Service	1925-12-10	Al St. John	John Sinclair	silent	Biff Comedies	Bischoff	Lost	
Live Cowards	1926-1-10	Stephen Roberts		silent	Mermaid Comedies	Educational	Extant	EYE Film Institute, the Netherlands
Rain and Shine	1926-1	Al St. John	John Sinclair	silent	Biff Comedies	Bischoff	Lost	
His Taking Ways	1926-2-2	Al St. John	John Sinclair	silent	Biff Comedies	Bischoff	Extant	
Hold Your Hat	1926-2-14	Stephen Roberts		silent	Mermaid Comedies	Educational	Lost	
Sky Bound	1926-3-28	Stephen Roberts	Otto Fries	silent	Mermaid Comedies	Educational	Lost	
Who Hit Me?	1926-7-11	Stephen Roberts	Estelle Bradley	silent	Mermaid Comedies	Educational	Extant	MOMA
Pink Elephants	1926-10-2	Stephen Roberts		silent	Mermaid Comedies	Educational	Lost	
Flaming Romance	1926-11-21	Stephen Roberts	Aileen Lopez	silent	Mermaid Comedies	Educational	Extant	LoC reel 2 only
High Sea Blues	1927-1-2	Stephen Roberts	Estelle Bradley	silent	Mermaid Comedies	Educational	Extant	
Listen Lena	1927-2-13	Stephen Roberts, Clem Beauchamp	Lucille Hutton	silent	Mermaid Comedies	Educational	Extant	
Hot Lightning	1927-3-6	Stephen Roberts	Clem Beauchamp	silent	Mermaid Comedies	Educational	Extant	Grapevine video VHS
Roped In	1927-3-20	Charles Lamont		silent	Mermaid Comedies	Educational	Lost	
Jungle Heat	1927-4-24	Stephen Roberts	Clem Beauchamp	silent	Mermaid Comedies	Educational	Extant	
No Cheating	1927-6-26	Stephen Roberts		silent	Mermaid Comedies	Educational	Lost	
High Spots	1927-7-31	Stephen Roberts		silent	Mermaid Comedies	Educational	Extant	LoC reel 2 only
Racing Mad	1928-1-8	Stephen Roberts	Estelle Bradley	silent	Mermaid Comedies	Educational	Extant	Lobster Films
Call Your Shots	1928-9-16	Stephen Roberts	Otto Fries	silent	Mermaid Comedies	Educational	Lost	
Hot or Cold	1928-12-2	Stephen Roberts	Harold Goodwin	silent	Mermaid Comedies	Educational	Extant	
Smart Steppers	1929-3-3	Stephen Roberts		silent	Mermaid Comedies	Educational	Lost	
Hot Times	1929-5-26	Stephen Roberts		silent	Mermaid Comedies	Educational	Lost	
Western Knights	1930-4-30	Stephen Roberts	Eddie Lambert	sound	Mermaid Comedies	Educational	Extant	
Two Fresh Eggs	1930-7-6	Monte Carter	Jimmy Aubrey	sound	E.B. Derr Productions	Pathé	Extant	
Honeymoon Trio	1931-8-30	Roscoe Arbuckle	Walter Catlett	sound	Cameo Comedies	Educational	Extant	
That's My Meat	1931-10-4	Roscoe Arbuckle		sound	Cameo Comedies	Educational	Extant	
Bridge Wives	1932-2-21	Roscoe Arbuckle	Fern Emmett	sound	Cameo Comedies	Educational	Extant	

== Fuzzy Q. Jones appearances ==
"Fuzzy Q. Jones" was developed when Al St. John filled in for actor Fuzzy Knight on a film Knight was unable to make. St. John made more than 80 western films in this character, which proved indispensable to the PRC studio and so popular that "Fuzzy Settles Down" (1944) remains the only American B-Western that is titled after the sidekick. In post-war Germany, where Fuzzy was especially popular, he was always billed in the title of his pictures, despite the presence of the hero. It was as Fuzzy—whom Al came to regard as a separate person, apart from himself—that St. John finished out his long film career. These films had, in many cases, multiple theatrical distributors, and most of the PRCs were re-released in the 1950s by Madison Pictures, though in some instances in cut down versions. In cases where a television vendor is the more likely medium through which one may see a given title, the vendor is listed in the distribution field is given rather than the original theatrical distributor. A listing for a home video does not automatically mean that the title is still available for viewing. All of these films were made in sound, and are extant.

Title	Release date	Director	Star	Studio	Distributor	Home Video
The Roaming Cowboy	1937-1-4	Robert F. Hill	Fred Scott	Spectrum Pictures	Sony Pictures Television	
Melody of the Plains	1937-4-2	Sam Newfield	Fred Scott	Spectrum Pictures		
Moonlight on the Range	1937-10-6	Sam Newfield	Fred Scott	Spectrum Pictures		
The Fighting Deputy	1937-12-5	Sam Newfield	Fred Scott	Spectrum Pictures		
The Rangers' Round-Up	1938-2-9	Sam Newfield	Fred Scott	Spectrum Pictures	Reel Media Int'l	
Knight of the Plains	1938-5-7	Sam Newfield	Fred Scott	Spectrum Pictures		
Songs and Bullets	1938-5-15	Sam Newfield	Fred Scott	Spectrum Pictures		
Gunsmoke Trail	1938-5-27	Sam Newfield	Jack Randall	Conn Pictures	Monogram	
Trigger Pals	1939-1-13	Sam Newfield	Art Jarrett	Cinemart	Grand National	
Oklahoma Terror	1939-8-25	Spencer Gordon Bennet	Jack Randall	Monogram	Reel Media Int'l	
Billy the Kid Outlawed	1940-7-20	Sam Newfield	Bob Steele	PRC	PRC	
Billy the Kid in Texas	1940-9-30	Sam Newfield	Bob Steele	PRC	PRC	
Billy the Kid's Gun Justice	1940-12-20	Sam Newfield	Bob Steele	PRC	PRC	
The Lone Rider Rides On	1941-1-10	Sam Newfield	George Houston	PRC	PRC	
Billy the Kid's Range War	1941-1-24	Sam Newfield	Bob Steele	PRC	PRC	
The Lone Rider Crosses the Rio	1941-2-28	Sam Newfield	George Houston	PRC	Better Television	
Billy the Kid's Fighting Pals/Trigger Men	1941-4-18	Sam Newfield	Bob Steele	PRC	PRC	
The Lone Rider in Ghost Town	1941-5-16	Sam Newfield	George Houston	PRC	PRC	
Billy the Kid in Santa Fe	1941-7-11	Sam Newfield	Bob Steele	PRC	Better Television	
The Lone Rider in Frontier Fury/Rangeland Racket	1941-8-8	Sam Newfield	George Houston	PRC	PRC	
The Lone Rider Ambushed	1941-8-29	Sam Newfield	George Houston	PRC	PRC	
Billy the Kid Wanted	1941-10-4	Sam Newfield	Buster Crabbe	PRC	PRC	
Billy the Kid's Round-Up	1941-12-12	Sam Newfield	Buster Crabbe	PRC	Better Television	
The Lone Rider Fights Back	1941-12-17	Sam Newfield	George Houston	PRC	PRC	
The Lone Rider and the Bandit	1942-1-16	Sam Newfield	George Houston	PRC	Better Television, Reel Media Int'l	
Billy the Kid Trapped	1942-2-27	Sam Newfield	Buster Crabbe	PRC	Reel Media Int'l	
The Lone Rider in Cheyenne	1942-3-20	Sam Newfield	George Houston	PRC	PRC	
Billy the Kid's Smoking Guns	1942-5-1	Sam Newfield	Buster Crabbe	PRC	PRC	
The Lone Rider in Texas Justice	1942-6-5	Sam Newfield	George Houston	PRC	PRC	
Law and Order	1942-8-21	Sam Newfield	Buster Crabbe	PRC	PRC	
Sheriff of Sage Valley	1942-9-2	Sam Newfield	Buster Crabbe	PRC	PRC	
Border Roundup	1942-9-18	Sam Newfield	George Houston	PRC	PRC	
Overland Stagecoach	1942-10-11	Sam Newfield	Bob Livingston	PRC	PRC	
The Mysterious Rider/Panhandle Trail	1942-11-20	Sam Newfield	Buster Crabbe	PRC	PRC	
Outlaws of Boulder Pass	1942-11-28	Sam Newfield	George Houston	PRC	Reel Media Int'l	
The Kid Rides Again	1943-1-27	Sam Newfield	Buster Crabbe	PRC	Reel Media Int'l	
Wild Horse Rustlers	1943-2-12	Sam Newfield	Bob Livingston	PRC	PRC	
Fugitive of the Plains	1943-4-1	Sam Newfield	Buster Crabbe	PRC	PRC	
Death Rides the Plains	1943-5-7	Sam Newfield	Bob Livingston	PRC	PRC	
Western Cyclone/Frontier Fighters	1943-5-14	Sam Newfield	Buster Crabbe	PRC	PRC	
Wolves of the Range	1943-6-21	Sam Newfield	Bob Livingston	PRC	PRC	
Law of the Saddle	1943-7-28	Melville De Lay	Bob Livingston	PRC	PRC	
Cattle Stampede	1943-8-16	Sam Newfield	Buster Crabbe	PRC	Reel Media Int'l	
The Renegade/Code of the Plains	1943-8-25	Sam Newfield	Buster Crabbe	PRC	PRC	
Blazing Frontier	1943-9-4	Sam Newfield	Buster Crabbe	PRC	PRC	
Raiders of Red Gap	1943-9-30	Sam Newfield	Bob Livingston	PRC	PRC	
Devil Riders	1943-11-5	Sam Newfield	Buster Crabbe	PRC	Better Television	
Frontier Outlaws	1944-3-4	Sam Newfield	Buster Crabbe	PRC	Reel Media Int'l, Better Television	
Thundering Gun Slingers	1944-3-25	Sam Newfield	Buster Crabbe	PRC	PRC	
Valley of Vengeance	1944-5-5	Sam Newfield	Buster Crabbe	PRC	PRC	
The Drifter	1944-6-14	Sam Newfield	Buster Crabbe	PRC	PRC	
Fuzzy Settles Down	1944-6-25	Sam Newfield	Buster Crabbe	PRC	PRC	
Wild Horse Phantom	1944-10-28	Sam Newfield	Buster Crabbe	PRC	PRC	
Oath of Vengeance	1944-12-9	Sam Newfield	Buster Crabbe	PRC	Films Around the World, Better Television	
Lightning Raiders	1945-1-7	Sam Newfield	Buster Crabbe	PRC	Films Around the World	
His Brother's Ghost	1945-2-3	Sam Newfield	Buster Crabbe	PRC	Reel Media Int'l	
Shadows of Death	1945-4-19	Sam Newfield	Buster Crabbe	PRC	PRC	
Gangster's Den	1945-6-14	Sam Newfield	Buster Crabbe	PRC	Reel Media Int'l	
Stagecoach Outlaws	1945-8-17	Sam Newfield	Buster Crabbe	PRC	Films Around the World	
Rustlers' Hideout	1945-9-2	Sam Newfield	Buster Crabbe	PRC	PRC	
Border Badmen	1945-10-10	Sam Newfield	Buster Crabbe	PRC	Films Around the World, Better Television	
Fighting Bill Carson	1945-10-31	Sam Newfield	Buster Crabbe	PRC	PRC	
Prairie Rustlers	1945-11-7	Sam Newfield	Buster Crabbe	PRC	PRC	
Gentlemen with Guns	1946-3-27	Sam Newfield	Buster Crabbe	PRC	Better Television	
Terrors on Horseback	1946-5-1	Sam Newfield	Buster Crabbe	PRC	PRC	
Ghost of Hidden Valley	1946-6-6	Sam Newfield	Buster Crabbe	PRC	Films Around the World	
Prairie Badmen	1946-7-17	Sam Newfield	Buster Crabbe	PRC	PRC	
Overland Riders	1946-8-21	Sam Newfield	Buster Crabbe	PRC	Films Around the World	
Outlaws of the Plains	1946-9-22	Sam Newfield	Buster Crabbe	PRC	Films Around the World	
Law of the Lash	1947-2-28	Ray Taylor	Lash La Rue	PRC	Reel Media Int'l	
Border Feud	1947-5-10	Ray Taylor	Lash La Rue	PRC	Films Around the World	
Pioneer Justice	1947-6-28	Ray Taylor	Lash La Rue	PRC	Films Around the World	
Ghost Town Renegades	1947-7-26	Ray Taylor	Lash La Rue	PRC	Films Around the World	
Stage to Mesa City	1947-9-13	Ray Taylor	Lash La Rue	PRC	PRC	
Return of the Lash	1947-10-11	Ray Taylor	Lash La Rue	PRC	PRC	
The Fighting Vigilantes	1947-11-15	Ray Taylor	Lash La Rue	PRC	PRC	
Cheyenne Takes Over	1947-12-17	Ray Taylor	Lash La Rue	PRC	PRC	
Dead Man's Gold	1948-9-10	Ray Taylor	Lash La Rue	Western Adventures	Screen Guild	
Mark of the Lash	1948-10-15	Ray Taylor	Lash La Rue	Western Adventures	Screen Guild	
Frontier Revenge	1948-12-26	Ray Taylor	Lash La Rue	Western Adventures	Screen Guild	
Outlaw Country	1949-1-7	Ray Taylor	Lash La Rue	Western Adventures	Screen Guild	
Son of Billy the Kid	1949-4-2	Ray Taylor	Lash La Rue	Western Adventures	Screen Guild	
Son of a Badman	1949-4-16	Ray Taylor	Lash La Rue	Western Adventures	Screen Guild	
The Daltons' Women	1950-2-25	Thomas Carr	Lash La Rue	Western Adventures	Western Adventures	
King of the Bullwhip	1950-12-20	Ron Ormond	Lash La Rue	Western Adventures	Realart	
The Thundering Trail	1951-7-2	Ron Ormond	Lash La Rue	Western Adventures	Realart	
The Vanishing Outpost	1951-11-1	Ron Ormond	Lash La Rue	Western Adventures	Realart	
The Black Lash	1952-1-2	Ron Ormond	Lash La Rue	Western Adventures	Realart	
The Frontier Phantom	1951-12-13	Ron Ormond	Lash La Rue	Western Adventures	Realart	

== With Roscoe Arbuckle and/or Buster Keaton ==
Al St. John's association with his uncle, Roscoe "Fatty" Arbuckle, was central to his film career. Arbuckle first brought St. John to the Keystone set in 1913; over the years to follow, Arbuckle routinely employed St. John in playing rubes, rivals and other parts in support of his popular "Fatty" character. When Arbuckle left Keystone in early 1917 to form the Comique Comedy unit at Paramount, he and St. John were joined by stage comedian Buster Keaton, and the three created a singular cycle of silent comedies that exploited their matched acrobatic abilities and hard-driving capabilities in slapstick. This section represents onscreen appearances in films by St. John with either Arbuckle, Keaton or both, and it remains the most accessible area of Al St. John's silent comedy work. Arbuckle-directed comedies starring Al St. John are listed in the "Starring St. John" section above.

Title	Release date	Director	Arbuckle/Keaton	Silent/Sound	Studio	Distributor	Status	Ref
A Noise from the Deep	1913-7-13	Mack Sennett	Arbuckle	silent	Keystone	Mutual	Extant	LoC
The Riot	1913-8-11	Mack Sennett	Arbuckle	silent	Keystone	Mutual	Lost	
Mother's Boy	1913-9-25	Henry Lehrman	Arbuckle	silent	Keystone	Mutual	Lost	
His Sister's Kids	1913-12-20	George Nichols	Arbuckle	silent	Keystone	Mutual	Extant	
In the Clutches of the Gang	1914-1-17	George Nichols	Arbuckle	silent	Keystone	Mutual	Lost	
Tango Tangles	1914-3-9	Mack Sennett	Arbuckle	silent	Keystone	Mutual	Extant	
The Knockout	1914-6-11	Mack Sennett	Arbuckle	silent	Keystone	Mutual	Extant	
Fatty and the Heiress	1914-6-25	Roscoe Arbuckle	Arbuckle	silent	Keystone	Mutual	Lost	
Fatty's Finish	1914-7-2	Roscoe Arbuckle	Arbuckle	silent	Keystone	Mutual	Lost	
The Sky Pirate	1914-7-18	Roscoe Arbuckle, Edward Dillon	Arbuckle	silent	Keystone	Mutual	Lost	
Those Country Kids	1914-7-13	Mack Sennett	Arbuckle	silent	Keystone	Mutual	Extant	LoC, National Film Archive, London
Fatty's Gift	1914-8-24	Roscoe Arbuckle	Arbuckle	silent	Keystone	Mutual	Lost	
The Rounders	1914-9-7	Charlie Chaplin	Arbuckle	silent	Keystone	Mutual	Extant	
Bombs and Bangs	1914-9-14	Roscoe Arbuckle	Arbuckle	silent	Keystone	Mutual	Lost	
Lover's Luck	1914-9-19	Roscoe Arbuckle	Arbuckle	silent	Keystone	Mutual	Lost	
Fatty's Debut	1914-9-26	Roscoe Arbuckle	Arbuckle	silent	Keystone	Mutual	Lost	
Zip, the Dodger	1914-10-17	Roscoe Arbuckle	Arbuckle	silent	Keystone	Mutual	Extant	LoC
Fatty's Jonah Day	1914-11-16	Roscoe Arbuckle	Arbuckle	silent	Keystone	Mutual	Extant	MOMA
The Sea Nymphs	1914-11-23	Roscoe Arbuckle	Arbuckle	silent	Keystone	Mutual	Extant	Filmmuseum, Munich, Filmmuseum, Denmark
Leading Lizzie Astray	1914-11-30	Roscoe Arbuckle	Arbuckle	silent	Keystone	Mutual	Extant	
Shotguns That Kick	1914-12-3	Roscoe Arbuckle	Arbuckle	silent	Keystone	Mutual	Lost	
Fatty's Magic Pants	1914-12-14	Roscoe Arbuckle	Arbuckle	silent	Keystone	Mutual	Extant	
Fatty and Mabel's Simple Life	1915-1-18	Roscoe Arbuckle	Arbuckle	silent	Keystone	Mutual	Extant	LoC
Mabel, Fatty and the Law	1915-1-28	Roscoe Arbuckle	Arbuckle	silent	Keystone	Mutual	Extant	
Fatty's New Role	1915-2-1	Roscoe Arbuckle	Arbuckle	silent	Keystone	Mutual	Extant	
Mabel and Fatty's Married Life	1915-2-11	Roscoe Arbuckle	Arbuckle	silent	Keystone	Mutual	Extant	,
That Little Band of Gold	1915-3-15	Roscoe Arbuckle	Arbuckle	silent	Keystone	Mutual	Extant	
Fatty's Faithful Fido	1915-3-20	Roscoe Arbuckle	Arbuckle	silent	Keystone	Mutual	Extant	
When Love Took Wings	1915-4-1	Roscoe Arbuckle	Arbuckle	silent	Keystone	Mutual	Extant	
Mabel and Fatty Viewing the World's Fair at San Francisco	1915-4-22	Roscoe Arbuckle, Mabel Normand	Arbuckle	silent	Keystone	Mutual	Extant	
Mabel's Wilful Way	1915-5-1	Mabel Normand, Mack Sennett	Arbuckle	silent	Keystone	Mutual	Extant	
Fatty's Plucky Pup	1915-6-28	Roscoe Arbuckle	Arbuckle	silent	Keystone	Mutual	Extant	
Fickle Fatty's Fall	1915-11-3	Roscoe Arbuckle	Arbuckle	silent	Keystone	Triangle	Lost	
A Village Scandal	1915-12-12	Roscoe Arbuckle	Arbuckle	silent	Keystone	Triangle	Lost	
Fatty and the Broadway Stars	1915-12-15	Roscoe Arbuckle	Arbuckle	silent	Keystone	Triangle	Lost	
Fatty and Mabel Adrift	1916-1-9	Roscoe Arbuckle	Arbuckle	silent	Keystone	Triangle	Extant	
He Did and He Didn't	1916-1-30	Roscoe Arbuckle	Arbuckle	silent	Keystone	Triangle	Extant	
Bright Lights	1916-2-20	Roscoe Arbuckle	Arbuckle	silent	Keystone	Triangle	Lost	
His Wife's Mistakes	1916-4-2	Roscoe Arbuckle	Arbuckle	silent	Keystone	Triangle	Extant	LoC fragment (2 reels of 3)
The Other Man	1916-4-16	Mack Sennett	Arbuckle	silent	Keystone	Triangle	Lost	
The Waiters' Ball	1916-6-25	Roscoe Arbuckle	Arbuckle	silent	Keystone	Triangle	Extant	
A Creampuff Romance	1916-7-5	Roscoe Arbuckle	Arbuckle	silent	Keystone	Triangle	Lost	
The Butcher Boy	1917-4-23	Roscoe Arbuckle	Arbuckle/Keaton	silent	Comique	Paramount	Extant	
A Reckless Romeo	1913-5-21	Roscoe Arbuckle	Arbuckle/Keaton	silent	Comique	Paramount	Extant	
The Rough House	1917-6-25	Roscoe Arbuckle, Buster Keaton	Arbuckle/Keaton	silent	Comique	Paramount	Extant	
His Wedding Night	1917-8-20	Roscoe Arbuckle	Arbuckle/Keaton	silent	Comique	Triangle		
Oh Doctor!	1917-9-30	Roscoe Arbuckle	Arbuckle/Keaton	silent	Comique	Paramount	Extant	
Coney Island	1917-10-29	Roscoe Arbuckle	Arbuckle/Keaton	silent	Comique	Paramount	Extant	
A Country Hero	1917-7-13	Roscoe Arbuckle	Arbuckle/Keaton	silent	Comique	Paramount	Lost	
A Scrap of Paper	1918	Roscoe Arbuckle	Arbuckle	silent	Comique	Paramount	Extant	
Out West	1918-1-20	Roscoe Arbuckle	Arbuckle/Keaton	silent	Comique	Paramount	Extant	
The Bell Boy	1918-3-18	Roscoe Arbuckle	Arbuckle/Keaton	silent	Comique	Paramount	Extant	
Moonshine	1918-5-12	Roscoe Arbuckle	Arbuckle/Keaton	silent	Comique	Paramount	Extant	
Good Night, Nurse!	1918-7-8	Roscoe Arbuckle	Arbuckle/Keaton	silent	Comique	Paramount	Extant	
The Cook	1918-9-15	Roscoe Arbuckle	Arbuckle/Keaton	silent	Comique	Paramount	Extant	Nederlands Filmmuseum
Camping Out	1919-1-5	Roscoe Arbuckle	Arbuckle	silent	Comique	Paramount	Extant	Print combined from two fragments, incomplete
The Pullman Porter	1919-2-16	Roscoe Arbuckle	Arbuckle	silent	Comique	Paramount	Lost	
Love	1919-3-2	Roscoe Arbuckle	Arbuckle	silent	Comique	Paramount	Extant	Print combined from two fragments
A Desert Hero	1919-6-15	Roscoe Arbuckle	Arbuckle	silent	Comique	Paramount	Lost	
Back Stage	1919-9-7	Roscoe Arbuckle	Arbuckle/Keaton	silent	Comique	Paramount	Extant	
The Scarecrow	1920-12-22	Buster Keaton, Eddie Cline	Keaton	silent	Joseph M. Schenk	Metro	Extant	
Life of the Party (feature)	1920-11-13	Joseph Henabery	Arbuckle	silent	Famous Players–Lasky	Paramount	Extant	LoC
The High Sign	1921-4-18	Buster Keaton, Eddie Cline	Keaton	silent	Joseph M. Schenk	Metro	Extant	
The General (feature)	1926-12-21	Buster Keaton, Clyde Bruckman	Keaton	silent	Joseph M. Schenk	United Artists	Extant	many others
Buzzin' Around	1933-2-4	Alfred J. Goulding	Arbuckle	sound	Vitaphone	Warner Bros.	Extant	
Love Nest on Wheels	1937-3-26	Buster Keaton, Charles Lamont	Keaton	sound	Educational	20th Century Fox	Extant	

== Supporting roles ==
=== Shorts ===
Upon his arrival at Keystone, Al St. John was swiftly absorbed into the Keystone repertory company; he appeared in more 1914 films than Charlie Chaplin did. After Keystone, St. John appeared in support of other comics in 2-reelers up to the end of the silent era. Appearances in films with Roscoe Arbuckle are included in the list above. This list may be incomplete, as the full extent of St. John's appearances of this kind is not known, owing to so many lost films that may serve as possible candidates. For Keystones, the principal actor is included, though in many cases it is unclear who within the film that may be. Owing to the ensemble nature of many early Keystones, there are films which essentially do not have a central comedian as the fixture, and outside of Charlie Chaplin, survival rates on Keystones are less than what would be ideal. Unconfirmed appearances are not included in this list.

Title	Release year	Director	Star(s)	Silent/Sound	Studio	Distributor	Status	Ref
Double Crossed	1914-1-26	Ford Sterling	Ford Sterling	silent	Keystone	Mutual	Extant	LoC
Mabel's Strange Predicament	1914-2-9	Mabel Normand	Mabel Normand, Charles Chaplin	silent	Keystone	Mutual	Extant	
The Star Boarder	1914-4-4	George Nichols	Charles Chaplin	silent	Keystone	Mutual	Extant	
The Passing of Izzy	1913-4-11	George Nichols	William Nigh	silent	Keystone	Mutual	Lost	
Caught in a Cabaret	1914-4-27	Mabel Normand, Charles Chaplin	Mabel Normand, Charles Chaplin	silent	Keystone	Mutual	Extant	
Mabel's Busy Day	1914-6-13	Mabel Normand, Charles Chaplin	Mabel Normand, Charles Chaplin	silent	Keystone	Mutual	Extant	
Mabel's Married Life	1914-6-20	Mack Sennett	Mabel Normand, Charles Chaplin	silent	Keystone	Mutual	Extant	
Mabel's New Job	1914-7-13	George Nichols	Mabel Normand	silent	Keystone	Mutual	Lost	
Mabel's Blunder	1914-9-12	Mabel Normand	Mabel Normand	silent	Keystone	Mutual	Extant	Named to the (U.S.) National Film Registry, 2009
The New Janitor	1914-9-24	Charles Chaplin	Charles Chaplin	silent	Keystone	Mutual	Extant	
Hello, Mabel	1914-10-8	Mabel Normand	Mabel Normand	silent	Keystone	Mutual	Extant	
Stout Hearts But Weak Knees	1914-10-24	Unknown	Charles Murray	silent	Keystone	Mutual	Lost	
His Talented Wife	1914-11-9	Mack Sennett	Alice Davenport	silent	Keystone	Mutual	Lost	
His Prehistoric Past	1914-12-7	Charles Chaplin	Charles Chaplin	silent	Keystone	Mutual	Extant	
A Bird's a Bird	1915-2-8	Walter Wright	Chester Conklin	silent	Keystone	Mutual	Extant	
Droppington's Family Tree	1915-4-12	Dell Henderson	Chester Conklin	silent	Keystone	Mutual	Extant	
Our Dare-Devil Chief	1915-5-10	Charley Chase	Ford Sterling	silent	Keystone	Mutual	Extant	
Crossed Love and Swords	1915-5-15	Frank Griffin	Louise Fazenda	silent	Keystone	Mutual	Extant	LoC Paper Print Collection
Those Bitter Sweets	1915-6-7	F. Richard Jones	Mae Busch	silent	Keystone	Mutual	Extant	
A Home Breaking Hound	1915-6-14	Charley Chase	Don Barclay	silent	Keystone	Mutual	Lost	
Dirty Work in a Laundry	1915-7-13	Charley Chase	Minta Durfee	silent	Keystone	Mutual	Extant	LoC Paper Print Collection
A Rascal of Wolfish Ways	1915-8-9	F. Richard Jones, Mack Sennett	Mae Busch	silent	Keystone	Mutual	Lost	
Bombs!	1916-10-8	Frank Griffin	Charles Murray	silent	Keystone	Triangle	Extant	
At the Old Stage Door	1919-7-13	Hal Roach	Harold Lloyd	silent	Rolin Pictures	Pathé Exchange	Extant	MOMA
A Punch in the Nose	1926-1-3	J.A. Howe	Roach All-Star Comedy	silent	Hal Roach Studio	Pathé Exchange	Lost	
Life in Hollywood No. 2	1927-5-12	L.M. Be Dell	Documentary	silent	Goodwill Pictures	States Rights	Extant	AFI Murray Glass Collection
Screen Snapshots Series 9, No. 12	1930-5-1	Ralph Staub	John Boles	sound	Columbia	Columbia Pictures	Lost	
Marriage Rows	1931-1-18	Roscoe Arbuckle	Lloyd Hamilton	sound	Educational Pictures	Educational Film Exchanges	Lost	
Honeymoon Trio	1931-8-30	Roscoe Arbuckle	Walter Catlett	sound	Educational Pictures	Educational Film Exchanges	Extant	
Prairie Papas	1938-12-16	Ray Whitley	The Phelps Brothers	sound	RKO	RKO Radio Pictures	Lost	

=== Features ===
With the dawn of sound around 1930, Al St. John went from appearing almost exclusively in two-reel shorts to appearing almost exclusively in features. While his Fuzzy Q. Jones roles dominate St. John's feature output, he did appear in a number of features in other parts, mostly in Westerns. Some of these, particularly his serio-comic turn as "Uncle Billy" in The Outcasts of Poker Flat (1937), demonstrate a greater range of acting ability than the average Fuzzy Q. Jones role might suggest. Several parts listed here, however, are the tiniest of tiny bit roles.

Title	Release year	Director	Star(s)	Silent/Sound	Studio	Distributor	Status	Ref
Tillie's Punctured Romance	1914-12-21	Mack Sennett	Marie Dressler	silent	Keystone	Mutual	Extant	
The Garden of Weeds	1924-11-2	James Cruze	Betty Compson	silent	Famous Players–Lasky	Paramount	Lost	
American Beauty	1927-10-9	Richard Wallace	Billie Dove	silent	First National	First National	Lost	
Casey Jones	1927-12-20	Charles J. Hunt	Ralph Lewis	silent	Trem Carr Pictures	Rayart	Extant	LoC
Hello Cheyenne	1928-5-13	Eugene Forde	Tom Mix	silent	Fox Film Corp.	Fox	Lost	
Painted Post	1928-7-1	Eugene Forde	Tom Mix	silent	Fox Film Corp.	Fox	Lost	
She Goes to War	1929-6-8	Henry King	Eleanor Boardman	Part-talkie	Inspiration Pictures	United Artists	Extant	Exists only in 50 min. version (of 105 mi.)
The Dance of Life	1929-8-16	John Cromwell, Edward Sutherland	Hal Skelly	sound	Famous Players–Lasky	Paramount	Extant	
Hell Harbor	1930-3-15	Henry King	Lupe Velez	sound	Inspiration Pictures	United Artists	Extant	
The Oklahoma Cyclone	1930-8-8	John P. McCarthy	Bob Steele	sound	Trem Carr Pictures	Tiffany	Extant	
The Land of Missing Men	1930-10	John P. McCarthy	Bob Steele	sound	Trem Carr Pictures	Tiffany	Extant	
Beyond the Law	1930-11-2	John P. McCarthy	Robert Frazer	sound	Raytone Talking Pictures	Syndicate Pictures	Extant	
The Painted Desert	1931-3-7	Howard Higgin	Clark Gable	sound	RKO-Pathé	Pathé Exchanges	Extant	
Aloha	1931-4-27	Albert S. Rogell	Ben Lyon	sound	Tiffany Productions	Tiffany	Extant	Incomplete
A Son of the Plains	1931-7-5	Robert N. Bradbury	Bob Custer	sound	Trem Carr Pictures	Syndicate	Extant	
Police Court	1932-2-20	Louis King	Henry B. Walthall	sound	I.E. Chadwick	Monogram	Extant	
Riders of the Desert	1932-4-24	Robert N. Bradbury	Bob Steele	sound	Trem Carr Pictures	Sono-Art WorldWide	Extant	
Law of the North	1932-5-30	Harry L. Fraser	Bill Cody	sound	Monogram Pictures	Monogram	Extant	
His Private Secretary	1933-6-10	Phil Whitman	John Wayne	sound	Screencraft/Showmen's Pictures	Marcy Pictures	Extant	
Riders of Destiny	1933-10-10	Robert N. Bradbury	John Wayne	sound	Lone Star	Monogram	Extant	
From Headquarters	1933-11-16	William Dieterle, Michael Curtiz	George Brent	sound	Warner Bros.	Warner Bros.	Extant	
Public Stenographer	1934-1-10	Lewis D. Collins	Lola Lane	sound	Screencraft/Showmen's Pictures	Marcy Pictures	Extant	
She Gets Her Man	1935-8-5	William Nigh	Zasu Pitts	sound	Universal Pictures	Universal	Extant	
Wanderer of the Wasteland	1935-9-9	Otho Lovering	Dean Jagger	sound	Paramount Pictures	Paramount	Extant	UCLA Film & Television Archive
Midnight Phantom	1935-11-27	Bernard B. Ray	Reginald Denny	sound	Reliable Pictures	States Rights	Extant	
The Law of 45's	1935-12-1	John P. McCarthy	Guinn 'Big Boy' Williams	sound	Normandy Pictures	States Rights	Extant	
Bar 20 Rides Again	1935-12-6	Howard Bretherton	William "Hoppy" Boyd	sound	Reliable Pictures	States Rights	Extant	
Trigger Tom	1935-12-15	Harry S. Webb	Tom Tyler	sound	Reliable Pictures	States Rights	Extant	
A Face in the Fog	1936-2-1	Robert F. Hill	June Collyer	sound	Victory Pictures	States Rights	Extant	
The Millionaire Kid	1936-3-14	Bernard B. Ray	Betty Compson	sound	Reliable Pictures	States Rights	Extant	
The Ex-Mrs. Bradford	1936-5-13	Stephen Roberts	William Powell	sound	RKO Radio Pictures	RKO	Extant	
Pinto Rustlers	1936-5-14	Harry S. Webb	Tom Tyler	sound	Reliable Pictures	States Rights	Extant	
West of Nevada	1936-7-21	Robert F. Hill	Rex Bell	sound	Colony Pictures	States Rights	Extant	
Hopalong Cassidy Returns	1936-10-16	Nate Watt	William "Hoppy" Boyd	sound	Harry Sherman Productions	Paramount	Extant	St. John's role cut
Trail Dust	1936-12-11	Nate Watt	William "Hoppy" Boyd	sound	Harry Sherman Productions	Paramount	Extant	
The Outcasts of Poker Flat	1937-4-16	Christy Cabanne	Preston Foster	sound	RKO Radio Pictures	RKO	Extant	
Sing, Cowboy, Sing	1937-5-22	Robert N. Bradbury	Tex Ritter	sound	Boots & Saddles Pictures	Grand National	Extant	
A Lawman Is Born	1937-6-21	Sam Newfield	Johnny Mack Brown	sound	Supreme Pictures	Republic	Extant	
Saturday's Heroes	1937-10-8	Edward Killy	Van Heflin	sound	RKO Radio Pictures	RKO	Extant	
Start Cheering	1938-3-3	Albert S. Rogell	Jimmy Durante	sound	Columbia Pictures	Columbia	Extant	
Call of the Yukon	1938-4-18	B. Reeves Eason, John T. Coyle	Richard Arlen	sound	Republic Pictures	Republic	Extant	
Frontier Scout	1938-9-16	Sam Newfield	George Houston	sound	Conn Pictures	Grand National	Extant	
Exposed	1938-11-4	Harold D. Schuster	Glenda Farrell	sound	Universal Pictures	Universal	Extant	
Murder on the Yukon	1940-2-25	Louis J. Gasnier	James Newill	sound	Criterion Pictures	Monogram	Extant	
Marked Men	1940-9-30	Sam Newfield	Warren Hull	sound	PRC	PRC	Extant	
Li'l Abner	1940-11-1	Albert S. Rogell	Jeff York	sound	Vogue Productions	RKO	Extant	
Friendly Neighbors	1940-11-17	Nick Grinde	The Weaver Brothers and Elviry	sound	Republic Pictures	Republic	Extant?	
Texas Terrors	1940-11-27	George Sherman	Don "Red" Barry	sound	Republic Pictures	Republic	Extant	
A Missouri Outlaw	1941-11-25	George Sherman	Don "Red" Barry	sound	Republic Pictures	Republic	Extant	
Arizona Terrors	1942-1-13	George Sherman	Don "Red" Barry	sound	Republic Pictures	Republic	Extant	
Stagecoach Express	1942-3-6	George Sherman	Don "Red" Barry	sound	Republic Pictures	Republic	Extant	
Jesse James, Jr.	1942-3-25	George Sherman	Don "Red" Barry	sound	Republic Pictures	Republic	Extant	
Prairie Pals	1942-9-4	Sam Newfield	Art Davis	sound	PRC	PRC	Extant	
Along the Sundown Trail	1942-10-10	Sam Newfield	Art Davis	sound	PRC	PRC	Extant	
Valley of the Sun	1942-11-6	George Marshall	Lucille Ball	sound	RKO Radio Pictures	RKO	Extant	
My Son, the Hero	1943-4-5	Edgar G. Ulmer	Patsy Kelly	sound	Atlantis Pictures	PRC	Extant	
Dead Men Walk	1943-4-12	Sam Newfield	George Zucco	sound	PRC	PRC	Extant	
I'm from Arkansas	1944-10-31	Lew Landers	Slim Summerville	sound	PRC	PRC	Extant	
My Dog Shep	1946-12-1	Ford Beebe	Tom Neal	sound	Golden Gate Pictures	PRC	Extant	
Days of Thrills and Laughter	1961-3-21	Robert Youngson	Charles Chaplin	sound	Robert Youngson Productions	20th Century Fox	Extant	St. John only in library footage

== See also ==
- Al St. John
