= The Lone Rider in Texas Justice =

1942 film

- Directed by: Sam Newfield
- Screenplay by: Steve Braxton
- Produced by: Sigmund Neufeld
- Starring: George Houston; Al St. John; Dennis Moore; Wanda McKay; Claire Rochelle; Archie Hall
- Cinematography: Jack Greenhalgh
- Edited by: Holbrook N. Todd
- Production company: Sigmund Neufeld Productions
- Distributed by: Producers Releasing Corporation
- Release date: June 12, 1942
- Running time: 60 minutes
- Country: United States
- Language: English

The Lone Rider in Texas Justice is a 1942 American Western film directed by Sam Newfield and written by Steve Braxton. The film stars George Houston as the "Lone Rider", Al St. John as his sidekick "Fuzzy" Jones and Dennis Moore as Sheriff Smoky Moore, with Hillary Brooke, Karl Hackett, Lee Powell and Forrest Taylor. The film was released on June 12, 1942, by Producers Releasing Corporation.

This is the ninth movie in the Lone Rider series, which spans seventeen films—eleven starring George Houston, and a further six starring Robert Livingston.

Houston, once an opera singer, sang three songs in this film: "Ride, Cowboy, Ride", "There's Only One Rose in Texas" and "We Will Meet in the Valley". The songs were written by Johnny Lange and Lew Porter.

The movie was not distributed internationally, because it showed thieves dressing up as priests, which was deemed "sacrilegious to many foreign audiences."

== Plot ==
Having served prison time for a cattle rustling that he didn't commit, rancher Jack Stewart is set upon by a gang of vigilantes who want to hang him. Sheriff Smoky Moore is attacked while trying to protect Jack. Tom Cameron, the Lone Rider, and his sidekick Fuzzy Jones stop the hanging and chase the mob away. The real cattle rustler is Nora Mason, who wants Jack to be blamed for her crimes. She frames Jack again, and he's killed by a rancher whose cattle has been stolen. Tom has to unmask the real outlaw gang before they claim more innocent lives.

== Cast ==
- George Houston as Tom Cameron, the Lone Rider
- Al St. John as Fuzzy Jones
- Dennis Moore as Sheriff Smoky Moore
- Wanda McKay as Kate Stewart
- Claire Rochelle as Nora Mason
- Archie Hall as Trimmer Davis
- Slim Whitaker as Huxley
- Edward Peil Sr. as Hanagan
- Karl Hackett as Jack Stewart
- Julian Rivero as Padre José

== See also ==
The Lone Rider films starring George Houston:

- The Lone Rider Rides On (1941)
- The Lone Rider Crosses the Rio (1941)
- The Lone Rider in Ghost Town (1941)
- The Lone Rider in Frontier Fury (1941)
- The Lone Rider Ambushed (1941)
- The Lone Rider Fights Back (1941)
- The Lone Rider and the Bandit (1942)
- The Lone Rider in Cheyenne (1942)
- The Lone Rider in Texas Justice (1942)
- Border Roundup (1942)
- Outlaws of Boulder Pass (1942)

starring Robert Livingston:

- Overland Stagecoach (1942)
- Wild Horse Rustlers (1943)
- Death Rides the Plains (1943)
- Wolves of the Range (1943)
- Law of the Saddle (1943)
- Raiders of Red Gap (1943)
