= The Lone Rider in Ghost Town =

1941 film

- Theatrical release poster
- Directed by: Sam Newfield
- Screenplay by: Joseph O'Donnell
- Produced by: Sigmund Neufeld
- Starring: George Houston; Al St. John; Rebel Randall; Budd Buster; Frank Hagney; Stephen Chase
- Cinematography: Jack Greenhalgh
- Edited by: Holbrook N. Todd
- Production company: Sigmund Neufeld Productions
- Distributed by: Producers Releasing Corporation
- Release date: May 16, 1941
- Running time: 64 minutes
- Country: United States
- Language: English

The Lone Rider in Ghost Town is a 1941 American Western film directed by Sam Newfield and written by Joseph O'Donnell. The film stars George Houston as the Lone Rider and Al St. John as his sidekick "Fuzzy" Jones, with Rebel Randall, Budd Buster, Frank Hagney and Stephen Chase. The film was released on May 16, 1941, by Producers Releasing Corporation.

This is the third movie in the Lone Rider series, which spans seventeen films—eleven starring George Houston, and a further six starring Robert Livingston.

Houston, once an opera singer, sang four songs in this film: "Old Cactus Joe", "In Old Spring Valley", "Sweet Suzanna" and "Under Prairie Skies". The songs were written by Johnny Lange and Lew Porter. This film was later released on DVD as Ghost Mine.

== Plot ==
Tom Cameron, also known as the Lone Rider, and his sidekick, Fuzzy Jones, are called in to investigate if a ghost town actually has real ghosts haunting it. It turns out the truth is the "ghosts" are really the hideout for a gang of outlaws who fake the "ghosts" to keep people away.

== Cast ==
- George Houston as Tom Cameron, the Lone Rider
- Al St. John as Fuzzy Jones
- Rebel Randall as Helen Clark
- Budd Buster as Moosehide Larson
- Frank Hagney as O'Shea
- Stephen Chase as Bob Sinclair
- Reed Howes as Jim Gordon
- Charles King as Roberts
- George Chesebro as Jed
- Edward Peil Sr. as Dennis Clark
- Arch Hall Sr. as Roper

== See also ==
The Lone Rider films starring George Houston:

- The Lone Rider Rides On (1941)
- The Lone Rider Crosses the Rio (1941)
- The Lone Rider in Ghost Town (1941)
- The Lone Rider in Frontier Fury (1941)
- The Lone Rider Ambushed (1941)
- The Lone Rider Fights Back (1941)
- The Lone Rider and the Bandit (1942)
- The Lone Rider in Cheyenne (1942)
- The Lone Rider in Texas Justice (1942)
- Border Roundup (1942)
- Outlaws of Boulder Pass (1942)

starring Robert Livingston:

- Overland Stagecoach (1942)
- Wild Horse Rustlers (1943)
- Death Rides the Plains (1943)
- Wolves of the Range (1943)
- Law of the Saddle (1943)
- Raiders of Red Gap (1943)
