= The Lone Rider and the Bandit =

- Theatrical release poster
- Directed by: Sam Newfield
- Screenplay by: Sam Robins
- Produced by: Sigmund Neufeld
- Starring: George F. Houston; Al St. John; Dennis Moore; Vickie Lester; Glenn Strange; Jack Ingram
- Cinematography: Jack Greenhalgh
- Edited by: Holbrook N. Todd
- Production company: Sigmund Neufeld Productions
- Distributed by: Producers Releasing Corporation
- Release date: January 16, 1942
- Running time: 54 minutes
- Country: United States
- Language: English

The Lone Rider and the Bandit is a 1942 American Western film directed by Sam Newfield and written by Sam Robins. The film stars George F. Houston as the Lone Rider, Al St. John as his sidekick "Fuzzy" Jones and Dennis Moore as Sheriff Smoky Moore, with Vickie Lester, Glenn Strange and Jack Ingram. The film was released on January 16, 1942, by Producers Releasing Corporation.

This is the seventh movie in the Lone Rider series, which spans seventeen films—eleven starring George Houston, and a further six starring Robert Livingston. In this film, Dennis Moore joins the cast of the series as Sheriff Smoky Moore, and appears with Livingston and Al St. John for the next five films, ending in 1942's Overland Stagecoach.

Houston, once an opera singer, sang three songs in this film: "I'm the Best Man in the West", "Down the Moonlit Trail" and "Rainbow Valley". The songs were written by Johnny Lange and Lew Porter.

== Cast ==
- George F. Houston as Tom Cameron, the Lone Rider
- Al St. John as Fuzzy Jones
- Dennis Moore as Sheriff Smoky Moore
- Vickie Lester as Laura Hicks
- Glenn Strange as Luke Miller
- Jack Ingram as Joe
- Milton Kibbee as Sam Turner
- Carl Sepulveda as Jed Corbett
- Eddie Dean as First Miner
- Slim Whitaker as Second Miner
- Slim Andrews as Piano Player

== See also ==
The Lone Rider films starring George Houston:

- The Lone Rider Rides On (1941)
- The Lone Rider Crosses the Rio (1941)
- The Lone Rider in Ghost Town (1941)
- The Lone Rider in Frontier Fury (1941)
- The Lone Rider Ambushed (1941)
- The Lone Rider Fights Back (1941)
- The Lone Rider and the Bandit (1942)
- The Lone Rider in Cheyenne (1942)
- The Lone Rider in Texas Justice (1942)
- Border Roundup (1942)
- Outlaws of Boulder Pass (1942)

starring Robert Livingston:

- Overland Stagecoach (1942)
- Wild Horse Rustlers (1943)
- Death Rides the Plains (1943)
- Wolves of the Range (1943)
- Law of the Saddle (1943)
- Raiders of Red Gap (1943)
