= Border Roundup =

Film directed by Sam Newfield

- Theatrical release poster
- Directed by: Sam Newfield
- Screenplay by: Joseph O'Donnell
- Produced by: Sigmund Neufeld
- Starring: George F. Houston; Al St. John; Dennis Moore; Patricia Knox; Charles King; I. Stanford Jolley
- Cinematography: Jack Greenhalgh
- Edited by: Holbrook N. Todd
- Production company: Sigmund Neufeld Productions
- Distributed by: Producers Releasing Corporation
- Release date: September 18, 1942
- Running time: 57 minutes
- Country: United States
- Language: English

Border Roundup is a 1942 American Western film directed by Sam Newfield and written by Joseph O'Donnell. The film stars George F. Houston as the Lone Rider, Al St. John as his sidekick "Fuzzy" Jones, and Dennis Moore as Sheriff Smoky Moore, with Patricia Knox, Charles King and I. Stanford Jolley. The film was released on September 18, 1942, by Producers Releasing Corporation.

This is the tenth movie in the Lone Rider series, which spans seventeen films—eleven starring George Houston, and a further six starring Robert Livingston.

Houston, once an opera singer, sang three songs in this film: "There's a Cabin in the Clearin", "When a Cowboy Rides" and "The Rollin' Hills". The songs were written by Johnny Lange and Lew Porter.

== Cast ==
- George F. Houston as Tom Cameron, the Lone Rider
- Al St. John as Fuzzy Jones
- Dennis Moore as Sheriff Smoky Moore
- Patricia Knox as Amy Sloane
- Charles King as Blackie
- I. Stanford Jolley as Masters
- Edward Peil Sr. as Sheriff
- Jimmy Aubrey as Sourdough
- John Elliott as Jeff Sloane

== See also ==
The Lone Rider films starring George Houston:

- The Lone Rider Rides On (1941)
- The Lone Rider Crosses the Rio (1941)
- The Lone Rider in Ghost Town (1941)
- The Lone Rider in Frontier Fury (1941)
- The Lone Rider Ambushed (1941)
- The Lone Rider Fights Back (1941)
- The Lone Rider and the Bandit (1942)
- The Lone Rider in Cheyenne (1942)
- The Lone Rider in Texas Justice (1942)
- Border Roundup (1942)
- Outlaws of Boulder Pass (1942)

starring Robert Livingston:

- Overland Stagecoach (1942)
- Wild Horse Rustlers (1943)
- Death Rides the Plains (1943)
- Wolves of the Range (1943)
- Law of the Saddle (1943)
- Raiders of Red Gap (1943)
