= Outlaws of Boulder Pass =

1942 film

- Theatrical release poster
- Directed by: Sam Newfield
- Written by: Sam Robins (original screenplay)
- Produced by: Sigmund Neufeld
- Starring: See below
- Cinematography: Jack Greenhalgh
- Edited by: Holbrook N. Todd
- Distributed by: Producers Releasing Corporation
- Release date: 28 November 1942
- Running time: 58 minutes
- Country: United States
- Language: English

Outlaws of Boulder Pass is a 1942 American Western film directed by Sam Newfield. The film stars George Houston as the "Lone Rider" and Al St. John as his sidekick "Fuzzy" Jones, and Dennis Moore as Sheriff Smoky Hammer, with Marjorie Manners, I. Stanford Jolley and Karl Hackett. The film was released on 12 June 1942, by Producers Releasing Corporation.

This is the last of the eleven Lone Rider films starring George Houston as Tom Cameron. Starting with the next film, Overland Stagecoach, the Lone Rider will be played by Robert Livingston.

Houston, once an opera singer, sang two songs in this film: "Let Me Keep Roamin' the Prairie" and "The Grass Is Always Green in Sunshine Valley". The songs were written by Johnny Lange and Lew Porter.

== Cast ==
- George Houston as Tom Cameron, the Lone Rider
- Al St. John as Fuzzy Jones
- Dennis Moore as Sheriff Smoky Hammer
- Marjorie Manners as Tess Hammer, alias Tess Clayton
- I. Stanford Jolley as Gil Harkness
- Karl Hackett as Sid Clayton
- Charles King as Henchman Jake
- Ted Adams as Sheriff
- Kenne Duncan as Henchman Mulie
- Frank Ellis as Henchman Ringo

== Soundtrack ==
- George Houston - "The Lone Rider Song" (Written by Johnny Lange and Lew Porter)

== See also ==
The Lone Rider films starring George Houston:

- The Lone Rider Rides On (1941)
- The Lone Rider Crosses the Rio (1941)
- The Lone Rider in Ghost Town (1941)
- The Lone Rider in Frontier Fury (1941)
- The Lone Rider Ambushed (1941)
- The Lone Rider Fights Back (1941)
- The Lone Rider and the Bandit (1942)
- The Lone Rider in Cheyenne (1942)
- The Lone Rider in Texas Justice (1942)
- Border Roundup (1942)
- Outlaws of Boulder Pass (1942)

starring Robert Livingston:

- Overland Stagecoach (1942)
- Wild Horse Rustlers (1943)
- Death Rides the Plains (1943)
- Wolves of the Range (1943)
- Law of the Saddle (1943)
- Raiders of Red Gap (1943)
