= The Lone Rider Fights Back =

1941 film by Sam Newfield

- Theatrical release poster
- Directed by: Sam Newfield
- Screenplay by: Joseph O'Donnell
- Produced by: Sigmund Neufeld
- Starring: George Houston; Al St. John; Dorothy Short; Dennis Moore; Frank Hagney; Charles King
- Cinematography: Jack Greenhalgh
- Edited by: Holbrook N. Todd
- Production company: Sigmund Neufeld Productions
- Distributed by: Producers Releasing Corporation
- Release date: December 17, 1941
- Running time: 64 minutes
- Country: United States
- Language: English

The Lone Rider Fights Back is a 1941 American Western film directed by Sam Newfield and written by Joseph O'Donnell. The film stars George Houston as the Lone Rider and Al St. John as his sidekick "Fuzzy" Jones, with Dorothy Short, Dennis Moore, Frank Hagney and Charles King. The film was released on December 17, 1941, by Producers Releasing Corporation.

This is the sixth movie in the Lone Rider series, which spans seventeen films—eleven starring George Houston, and a further six starring Robert Livingston.

Houston, once an opera singer, sang two songs in this film: "It's All Over Now" and "Out Where the West Begins". The songs were written by Johnny Lange and Lew Porter.

This is the first appearance of Dennis Moore in the "Lone Rider" series, playing Al Williams. In the next film, The Lone Rider and the Bandit, Moore became a regular in the series, playing Sheriff Smoky Moore for the next six films.

== Cast ==
- George Houston as Tom Cameron, the Lone Rider
- Al St. John as Fuzzy Jones
- Dorothy Short as Jean Dennison
- Dennis Moore as Al Williams
- Frank Hagney as George Clarke
- Charles King as Mitter
- Frank Ellis as Gandon

== See also ==
The Lone Rider films starring George Houston:

- The Lone Rider Rides On (1941)
- The Lone Rider Crosses the Rio (1941)
- The Lone Rider in Ghost Town (1941)
- The Lone Rider in Frontier Fury (1941)
- The Lone Rider Ambushed (1941)
- The Lone Rider Fights Back (1941)
- The Lone Rider and the Bandit (1942)
- The Lone Rider in Cheyenne (1942)
- The Lone Rider in Texas Justice (1942)
- Border Roundup (1942)
- Outlaws of Boulder Pass (1942)

starring Robert Livingston:

- Overland Stagecoach (1942)
- Wild Horse Rustlers (1943)
- Death Rides the Plains (1943)
- Wolves of the Range (1943)
- Law of the Saddle (1943)
- Raiders of Red Gap (1943)
