= The Lone Rider Crosses the Rio =

1941 film

- Theatrical release poster
- Directed by: Sam Newfield
- Screenplay by: William Lively
- Produced by: Sigmund Neufeld
- Starring: George Houston; Al St. John; Roquell Verria; Charles King; Julian Rivero; Stephen Chase
- Cinematography: Jack Greenhalgh
- Edited by: Holbrook N. Todd
- Production company: Sigmund Neufeld Productions
- Distributed by: Producers Releasing Corporation
- Release date: February 28, 1941
- Running time: 58 minutes
- Country: United States
- Language: English

The Lone Rider Crosses the Rio is a 1941 American Western film directed by Sam Newfield and written by William Lively. The film stars George Houston as the Lone Rider and Al St. John as his sidekick "Fuzzy" Jones, with Roquell Verria, Charles King, Julian Rivero and Stephen Chase. The film was released on February 28, 1941, by Producers Releasing Corporation.

This is the second movie in the Lone Rider series, which spans 17 films—eleven starring George Houston, and a further six starring Robert Livingston.

Houston, once an opera singer, sang three songs in this film: "It's a Gay Fiesta", "Git Along Cowboy" and "I'm Pancho, the Mexican Bandit". The songs were written by Johnny Lange and Lew Porter.

== Plot ==
Tom, The Lone Rider, is hiding from bad guys in Mexico with his friend Fuzzy. While there, Tom and Fuzzy agree to help the son of a Mexican mayor fake his kidnapping so he can continue an affair the young man is having with a cabaret singer despite his father's objections. Unfortunately, when the young man is really kidnapped, Tom and Fuzzy take the blame.

== Cast ==
- George Houston as Tom Cameron, the Lone Rider
- Al St. John as Fuzzy Jones
- Roquell Verria as Rosalie
- Charles King as Jarvis
- Julian Rivero as Pedro
- Stephen Chase as Hatfield
- Thornton Edwards as Manuel Torres
- Howard Masters as Francisco Torres
- Jay Wilsey as Bart
- Frank Ellis as Fred
- Frank Hagney as Marty
- Felipe Turich as Lieutenant Mendoza

== See also ==
The Lone Rider films starring George Houston:

- The Lone Rider Rides On (1941)
- The Lone Rider Crosses the Rio (1941)
- The Lone Rider in Ghost Town (1941)
- The Lone Rider in Frontier Fury (1941)
- The Lone Rider Ambushed (1941)
- The Lone Rider Fights Back (1941)
- The Lone Rider and the Bandit (1942)
- The Lone Rider in Cheyenne (1942)
- The Lone Rider in Texas Justice (1942)
- Border Roundup (1942)
- Outlaws of Boulder Pass (1942)

starring Robert Livingston:

- Overland Stagecoach (1942)
- Wild Horse Rustlers (1943)
- Death Rides the Plains (1943)
- Wolves of the Range (1943)
- Law of the Saddle (1943)
- Raiders of Red Gap (1943)
