= The Lone Rider in Frontier Fury =

1941 film by Sam Newfield

- Theatrical release poster
- Directed by: Sam Newfield
- Written by: Fred Myton (original screenplay)
- Produced by: Sigmund Neufeld (producer)
- Starring: George Houston; Al St. John; Hillary Brooke; Karl Hackett; Ted Adams; Arch Hall Sr.
- Cinematography: Jack Greenhalgh
- Edited by: Holbrook N. Todd
- Production company: Sigmund Neufeld Productions
- Distributed by: Producers Releasing Corporation
- Release date: August 8, 1941
- Running time: 53 minutes
- Country: United States
- Language: English

The Lone Rider in Frontier Fury is a 1941 American Western film directed by Sam Newfield. The film stars George Houston as the "Lone Rider" and Al St. John as his sidekick "Fuzzy" Jones, with Hillary Brooke, Karl Hackett, Ted Adams and Arch Hall Sr. The film was released on August 8, 1941, by Producers Releasing Corporation. The film is also known as Frontier Fury in the United Kingdom and Rangeland Racket (American reissue title).

This is the fourth movie in the Lone Rider series, which spans seventeen films—eleven starring George Houston, and a further six starring Robert Livingston.

Houston, once an opera singer, sang three songs in this film: "Down by the Old Alamo", "A Love That Faded Too Soon" and "Ride 'Em Cowboy". The songs were written by Johnny Lange and Lew Porter.

== Cast ==
- George Houston as Tom Cameron, the Lone Rider
- Al St. John as Fuzzy Q. Jones
- Hillary Brooke as Georgia Deering
- Karl Hackett as Matt Malone
- Ted Adams as Case Murdock
- Arch Hall Sr. as Clyde Barton
- Budd Buster as "Loco" Weed - Ranch Hand
- Virginia Card as Midge Malone
- Edward Peil Sr. as Mr. Harper - Cattle Rancher
- John Elliott as Rancher Jim Bowen
- Tom London as Curley - Saloon Henchman
- Frank Ellis as Joe - Saloon Henchman

== See also ==
The Lone Rider films starring George Houston:

- The Lone Rider Rides On (1941)
- The Lone Rider Crosses the Rio (1941)
- The Lone Rider in Ghost Town (1941)
- The Lone Rider in Frontier Fury (1941)
- The Lone Rider Ambushed (1941)
- The Lone Rider Fights Back (1941)
- The Lone Rider and the Bandit (1942)
- The Lone Rider in Cheyenne (1942)
- The Lone Rider in Texas Justice (1942)
- Border Roundup (1942)
- Outlaws of Boulder Pass (1942)

starring Robert Livingston:

- Overland Stagecoach (1942)
- Wild Horse Rustlers (1943)
- Death Rides the Plains (1943)
- Wolves of the Range (1943)
- Law of the Saddle (1943)
- Raiders of Red Gap (1943)
