= The Lone Rider Ambushed =

1941 American Western film

- Theatrical release poster
- Directed by: Sam Newfield
- Screenplay by: Oliver Drake
- Produced by: Sigmund Neufeld
- Starring: George Houston; Al St. John; Maxine Leslie; Frank Hagney; Jack Ingram; Hal Price
- Cinematography: Jack Greenhalgh
- Edited by: Holbrook N. Todd
- Production company: Sigmund Neufeld Productions
- Distributed by: Producers Releasing Corporation
- Release date: August 29, 1941
- Running time: 63 minutes
- Country: United States
- Language: English

The Lone Rider Ambushed is a 1941 American Western film directed by Sam Newfield and written by Oliver Drake. The film stars George Houston as the Lone Rider and Al St. John as his sidekick "Fuzzy" Jones, with Maxine Leslie, Frank Hagney, Jack Ingram and Hal Price. The film was released on August 29, 1941, by Producers Releasing Corporation.

This is the fifth movie in the Lone Rider series, which spans seventeen films—eleven starring George Houston, and a further six starring Robert Livingston. In this film, Houston plays a dual role as both the Lone Rider and the villain, Keno Harris.

Houston, once an opera singer, sang three songs in this film: "Without You Darling, Life Wouldn't Be the Same", "Ridin' Roamin' on the Prairie" and "If It Hadn't Been for You". The songs were written by Johnny Lange and Lew Porter.

This film was later released on DVD as Trapped in the Badlands.

== Plot ==
Tom Cameron, the Lone Rider, pretends to be an outlaw named Keno—a task made easier due to the fact that Tom looks exactly like the outlaw. He pretends to be the outlaw in order to find Keno's accomplices, and recover a large sum of stolen money from Keno's last heist. Unfortunately for the Lone Rider, one of the outlaw's buddies, Blackie Dawson, begins to suspect Tom is not who he claims to be.

== Cast ==
- George Houston as Tom Cameron, the Lone Rider / Keno Harris
- Al St. John as Fuzzy Q. Jones
- Maxine Leslie as Linda
- Frank Hagney as Blackie Dawson
- Jack Ingram as Charlie Davis
- Hal Price as Sheriff
- Ted Adams as Deputy Slim Pettit
- George Chesebro as Pete
- Ralph Peters as Bartender Gus
- Charles King as Ranch Hand

== See also ==
The Lone Rider films starring George Houston:

- The Lone Rider Rides On (1941)
- The Lone Rider Crosses the Rio (1941)
- The Lone Rider in Ghost Town (1941)
- The Lone Rider in Frontier Fury (1941)
- The Lone Rider Ambushed (1941)
- The Lone Rider Fights Back (1941)
- The Lone Rider and the Bandit (1942)
- The Lone Rider in Cheyenne (1942)
- The Lone Rider in Texas Justice (1942)
- Border Roundup (1942)
- Outlaws of Boulder Pass (1942)

starring Robert Livingston:

- Overland Stagecoach (1942)
- Wild Horse Rustlers (1943)
- Death Rides the Plains (1943)
- Wolves of the Range (1943)
- Law of the Saddle (1943)
- Raiders of Red Gap (1943)
