= The Lone Rider Rides On =

1941 film

- Theatrical release poster
- Directed by: Sam Newfield
- Screenplay by: Joseph O'Donnell
- Produced by: Sigmund Neufeld
- Starring: George Houston; Al St. John; Hillary Brooke; Karl Hackett; Lee Powell; Forrest Taylor
- Cinematography: Jack Greenhalgh
- Edited by: Holbrook N. Todd
- Production company: Sigmund Neufeld Productions
- Distributed by: Producers Releasing Corporation
- Release date: January 10, 1941
- Running time: 61 minutes
- Country: United States
- Language: English

The Lone Rider Rides On is a 1941 American Western film directed by Sam Newfield and written by Joseph O'Donnell. The film stars George Houston as the Lone Rider and Al St. John as his sidekick "Fuzzy" Jones, with Hillary Brooke, Karl Hackett, Lee Powell and Forrest Taylor. The film was released on January 10, 1941, by Producers Releasing Corporation.

It is the first film in the 1941-1943 Lone Rider series, which spanned 17 movies — eleven starring George Houston, and a further six starring Robert Livingston. Houston was replaced in 1942 with Overland Stagecoach.

The series also starred Al St. John as the Lone Rider's sidekick, "Fuzzy" Jones, who appeared in all seventeen films. At the same time that he appeared in the "Lone Rider" films, St. John was also playing the same character as Billy the Kid's sidekick in PRC's "Billy the Kid" series, which ran from 1940-1946.

Houston, once an opera singer, sang three songs in this film: the theme "I'm the Lone Lone Rider," "Roll Along Prairie Wagon," and "Nobody's Fault But My Own." The songs were written by Johnny Lange and Lew Porter.

The working title of the film was The Lone Rider Galloping for Glory. This film was later released on DVD as Rider of the Plains.

== Plot ==
Young Tom Cameron's family is killed while trying to reach their new land in Miracle Valley. As a grown man, Tom is a solitary vigilante, hoping to track down his family's killers. He finds another murdered man with a bill of sale to the same plot of land, and tracks the killers to the town of Flat Rock. Befriending a storekeeper, "Fuzzy" Q. Jones, Tom learns that a gang has been selling the same land to people for years, slaying them on their journey. Tom discovers that one of the gang members, Curly, is actually his brother Jimmy, who he thought was killed. With the help of Fuzzy and rancher Sue Brown, Tom kidnaps the gang's leader and rounds up the gang. In the end, Curly takes a bullet for Tom, dying heroically. Fuzzy wants Tom to be the new mayor of Flat Rock, but Tom chooses to remain a Lone Rider.

== Cast ==
- George Houston as Tom Cameron, the Lone Rider
- Al St. John as Fuzzy Jones
- Hillary Brooke as Sue Brown
- Karl Hackett as Judge Graham
- Lee Powell as Curly Robbins
- Forrest Taylor as Sheriff
- Frank Hagney as Frank Mitchell
- Jay Wilsey as Bill
- Frank Ellis as Pete
- Curly Dresden as Jerry
- Buddy Roosevelt as Joe
- Alan Bridge as Bob Cameron
- Isabelle LaMal as Ma Cameron
- Harry Harvey Jr. as Jim
- Robert Winkler as Young Tom
- Don Forrest as Eddie
- Bob Kortman as Henchman

== Theme song ==
The Lone Rider's theme song, "I'm the Lone Lone Rider", debuts in this first chapter of the series, sung by George Houston.

The lyrics begin:

I'm the Lone Rider on the great divide
All alone roaming far and wide
When a helping hand is needed, I am ready without fail
I'm the Lone Rider, on the trail ...

== Film series ==
The Lone Rider films starring George Houston:

- The Lone Rider Rides On (1941)
- The Lone Rider Crosses the Rio (1941)
- The Lone Rider in Ghost Town (1941)
- The Lone Rider in Frontier Fury (1941)
- The Lone Rider Ambushed (1941)
- The Lone Rider Fights Back (1941)
- The Lone Rider and the Bandit (1942)
- The Lone Rider in Cheyenne (1942)
- The Lone Rider in Texas Justice (1942)
- Border Roundup (1942)
- Outlaws of Boulder Pass (1942)

starring Robert Livingston:

- Overland Stagecoach (1942)
- Wild Horse Rustlers (1943)
- Death Rides the Plains (1943)
- Wolves of the Range (1943)
- Law of the Saddle (1943)
- Raiders of Red Gap (1943)
