= Prairie Pals =

1942 film by Sam Newfield

- Directed by: Sam Newfield
- Written by: Patricia Harper
- Produced by: Sigmund Neufeld
- Starring: See below
- Cinematography: Jack Greenhalgh
- Edited by: Holbrook N. Todd
- Music by: Johnny Lange; Lew Porter
- Distributed by: Producers Releasing Corporation
- Release date: September 4, 1942
- Running time: 58 minutes
- Country: United States
- Language: English

Prairie Pals is a 1942 American Western film directed by Sam Newfield.

== Cast ==
- Art Davis as Deputy Marshal Art Davis
- Bill 'Cowboy Rambler' Boyd as Deputy Marshal Bill Boyd
- Lee Powell as Marshal Lee Powell
- Esther Estrella as Betty Wainwright
- Charles King as Henchman Mitchell
- John Merton as Henchman Ed Blair
- Jack Holmes as Mr. Wainwright
- Kermit Maynard as Henchman Crandall
- I. Stanford Jolley as Ace Shannon

== Soundtrack ==
- Bill "Cowboy Rambler" Boyd and Art Davis - "I Wish I Knew The Way You Feel" (Written by Johnny Lange and Lew Porter)
