= Frontier Scout =

Frontier Scout may refer to:

- Quincannon, Frontier Scout, a 1956 American Western film
- Frontier Scout (1938 film), an American Western film
