= Patti McCarty =

American actress (1921–1985)

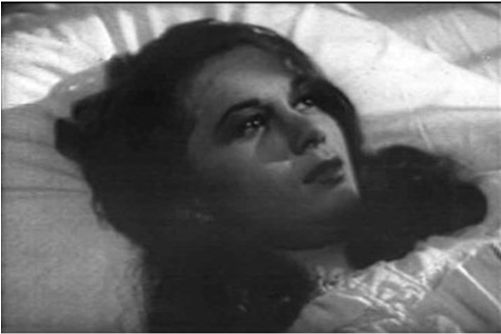
- Patti McCarty in Bluebeard (1944)
- Born: February 11, 1921; Bakersfield, California, U.S.
- Died: July 7, 1985 (aged 64); Honolulu, Hawaii, U.S.
- Occupation: Actress

Lois Patricia McCarty (February 11, 1921 - July 7, 1985) was an American actress.

== Biography ==
Baker was born in Bakersfield, California, and grew up in Healdsburg. She graduated from Covina High School in Covina, California, and she attended Los Angeles City College.

Prior to becoming a film actress, McCarty was a secretary for actress Dorothy Lamour. Lamour helped her to obtain a bit part in the film Chad Hanna (1940).

In January 1941, McCarty began working for Columbia Pictures, but in August of that year, the studio declined to take up the option on her contract. From 1941 through 1946 she was a Hollywood B movie actress and performed bit parts in 23 films.

She died on July 7, 1985, in Honolulu, Hawaii, at the age of 64.

== Filmography ==
- Under Age (1941)
- She Knew All the Answers (1941)
- Adventure in Washington (1941)
- Blondie in Society (1941)
- Prairie Stranger (1941)
- You'll Never Get Rich (1941)
- The Officer and the Lady (1941)
- Beyond the Blue Horizon (1942)
- Wake Island (1942)
- Here We Go Again (1942)
- Death Rides the Plains (1943)
- Let's Face It (1943)
- Fighting Valley (1943)
- Isle of Forgotten Sins (1943)
- Devil Riders (1943)
- Fuzzy Settles Down (1944)
- Gunsmoke Mesa (1944)
- Gangsters of the Frontier (1944)
- Bluebeard (1944)
- Rustlers' Hideout (1944)
- Terrors on Horseback (1946)
- Overland Riders (1946)
- Outlaws of the Plains (1946)
