= The Lone Rider in Cheyenne =

1942 film directed by Sam Newfield

- Theatrical release poster
- Directed by: Sam Newfield
- Screenplay by: Oliver Drake; Elizabeth Beecher
- Produced by: Sigmund Neufeld
- Starring: George Houston; Al St. John; Dennis Moore; Ella Neal; Roy Barcroft; Kenne Duncan
- Cinematography: Jack Greenhalgh
- Edited by: Holbrook N. Todd
- Production company: Sigmund Neufeld Productions
- Distributed by: Producers Releasing Corporation
- Release date: March 20, 1942
- Running time: 59 minutes
- Country: United States
- Language: English

The Lone Rider in Cheyenne is a 1942 American Western film directed by Sam Newfield and written by Oliver Drake and Elizabeth Beecher. The film stars George Houston as the Lone Rider, Al St. John as his sidekick "Fuzzy" Jones, and Dennis Moore as Sheriff Smoky Moore, with Ella Neal, Roy Barcroft and Kenne Duncan. The film was released on March 20, 1942, by Producers Releasing Corporation.

This is the eighth movie in the Lone Rider series, which spans seventeen films—eleven starring George Houston, and a further six starring Robert Livingston.

== Plot ==
Smoky Moore is riding to Cheyenne to see his stepfather Bill Hastings, whom he has not seen in fifteen years. His father is the town sheriff. Smoky witnesses Dan Blodgett, the town's mayor, and Mort Saunders, head of the Cattleman's Association, robbing the bank at night. During the robbery, a guard is killed, and Smoky somehow winds up getting arrested for both the robbery and the murder! Tom Cameron (The Lone Rider) and his faithful sidekick Fuzzy Jones break their pal Smoky out of the prison, and weeks later, the three of them sneak back into town disguised and attempt to expose the so-called good upstanding citizens who were responsible for the crimes.

== Cast ==
- George Houston as Tom Cameron, the Lone Rider
- Al St. John as Fuzzy Jones
- Dennis Moore as Smoky Moore
- Ella Neal as Betty Tolliver
- Roy Barcroft as Mort Saunders, head of the cattleman's union
- Karl Hackett as Mayor Dan Blodgett
- Jack Holmes as Sheriff Bill Hastings
- Kenne Duncan as Walt, the deputy
- Lynton Brent as henchman Dirk Larkin
- Jack Ingram as henchman Jed Saunders
- George Chesebro as henchman Pete Haynes
- Milton Kibbee as Joe Carson

== See also ==
The Lone Rider films starring George Houston (actor):

- The Lone Rider Rides On (1941)
- The Lone Rider Crosses the Rio (1941)
- The Lone Rider in Ghost Town (1941)
- The Lone Rider in Frontier Fury (1941)
- The Lone Rider Ambushed (1941)
- The Lone Rider Fights Back (1941)
- The Lone Rider and the Bandit (1942)
- The Lone Rider in Cheyenne (1942)
- The Lone Rider in Texas Justice (1942)
- Border Roundup (1942)
- Outlaws of Boulder Pass (1942)

The "Lone Rider" films starring Robert Livingston (actor):

- Overland Stagecoach (1942)
- Wild Horse Rustlers (1943)
- Death Rides the Plains (1943)
- Wolves of the Range (1943)
- Law of the Saddle (1943)
- Raiders of Red Gap (1943)
