= Edward Peil Sr. =

American actor (1883–1958)

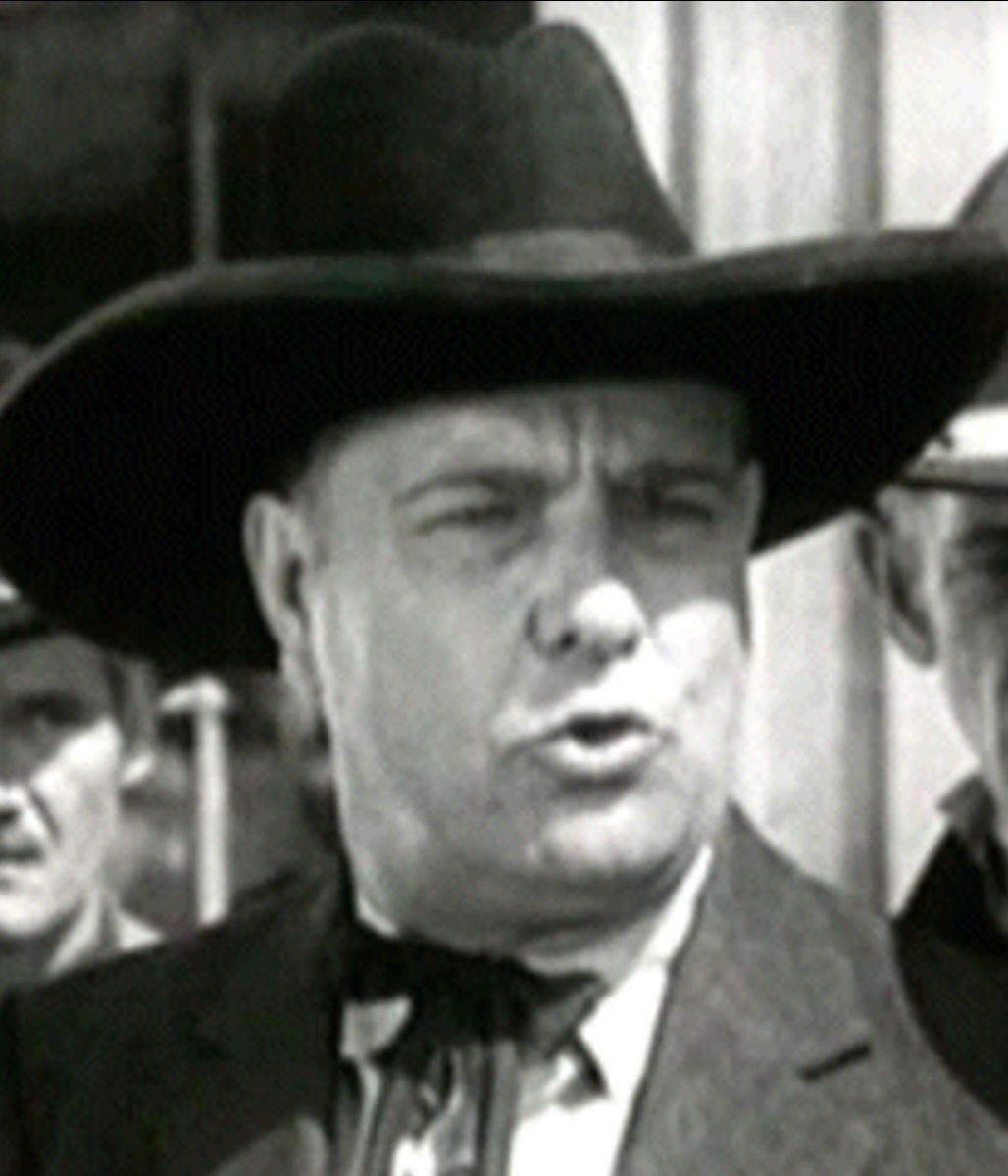
- Peil in Blue Steel (1934)
- Born: Edward J. Peil; January 18, 1883; Racine, Wisconsin, U.S.
- Died: December 29, 1958 (aged 75); Hollywood, California, U.S.
- Education: University of Notre Dame
- Occupation: Actor
- Years active: 1913–1951
- Spouse: Henriette (Etta) Raynor (1906-?)
- Children: 2

Edward J. Peil Sr. (January 18, 1883 – December 29, 1958) was an American film actor. He appeared in more than 370 films between 1913 and 1951.

== Biography ==
Peil was born in Racine, Wisconsin, one of 10 children of Mr. and Mrs. John H. Pell. He attended Racine High School and the University of Notre Dame, studying dramatics, which led to his acting on stage and later in films. His first film was Charley's Aunt (1906). He had the lead in the first five-reel film, Through Fire to Fortune (1910). He also acted in the first film that used artificial illumination outdoors at night, the first three-reel color film, and the first Technicolor film.

Peil's wife, Henrietta, was an actress. They were married in 1916 in Wabash, Indiana, while both were touring with the Chicago Majestic Theater Stock Company. Peil died in Hollywood, California.

His son, Edward Peil Jr., and his daughter, Virginia, also acted in films.

== Selected filmography ==
- The Living Death (1915)
- Unto Those Who Sin (1916)
- Whose Wife? (1917)
- The Serpent's Tooth (1917)
- You Can't Believe Everything (1918)
- The Greatest Thing in Life (1918)
- Cheating the Public (1918)
- The Shuttle (1918)
- Peppy Polly (1919)
- Broken Blossoms (1919)
- The Pagan God (1919)
- Prudence on Broadway (1919)
- The Gray Wolf's Ghost (1919)
- The Dragon Painter (1919)
- The Lincoln Highwayman (1919)
- Haunting Shadows (1919)
- Fighting Cressy (1919)
- The Road to Divorce (1920)
- The Money Changers (1920)
- Two Moons (1920)
- That Girl Montana (1921)
- The Killer (1921)
- The Servant in the House (1921)
- Dream Street (1921)
- The Dust Flower (1922)
- Tom Mix in Arabia (1922)
- Broken Chains (1922)
- The Song of Life (1922)
- Three Jumps Ahead (1923)
- Stepping Fast (1923)
- The Purple Dawn (1923) as Wong Chong, the Tong leader
- The Lone Star Ranger (1923)
- The Man Who Came Back (1924)
- $50,000 Reward (1924)
- The Iron Horse (1924) as Old Chinese Railroad Worker (uncredited)
- The Fighting Heart (1925)
- The Hunted Woman (1925)
- Double Action Daniels (1925)
- Queen o'Diamonds (1926)
- The Girl from Montmartre (1926)
- Yellow Fingers (1926)
- Midnight Faces (1926)
- Black Paradise (1926)
- Gigolo (1926)
- The Great K & A Train Robbery (1926) as Bill Tolfree
- Cock o' the Walk (1930)
- Wild Horse (1931)
- The Galloping Ghost (1931)
- The Devil Horse (1932)
- The Gay Buckaroo (1932)
- The Three Musketeers (1933) as Leon Ratkin
- Blue Steel (1934) as Malgrove
- The Man from Utah (1934) as Spike Barton
- Million Dollar Baby (1934)
- Barbary Coast (1935) as Vigilante (uncredited)
- Code of the Range (1936) as Sheriff
- Trapped (1937)
- Two-Fisted Sheriff (1937) as Judge Webster
- The Colorado Trail (1938) as Hobbs
- The Buccaneer (1938) as Victory Ball Guest (uncredited)
- You Can't Take It with You (1938) as Neighbor (uncredited)
- The Night Riders (1939) as Rancher Harper
- Dodge City (1939) as Mr. Turner (uncredited)
- Billy the Kid's Gun Justice (1940) as Dave Barlow
- I Wanted Wings (1941) as Detective (uncredited)
- Fugitive Valley (1941) as Ed
- The Lone Rider in Ghost Town (1941) as Dennis Clark
- The Lone Rider in Frontier Fury (1941) as Mr. Harper
- Billy the Kid's Fighting Pals (1941) as Hardy
- The Lone Rider in Texas Justice (1942) as Hanagan
- Border Roundup (1942) as Sheriff
- Reap the Wild Wind (1942) as Bailiff (uncredited)
- My Favorite Blonde (1942) as Policeman (uncredited)
- The Pride of the Yankees (1942) as Policeman (uncredited)
- The Kid Rides Again (1943) as John Ainsley
- The Major and the Minor (1942) as Stationmaster (uncredited)
- The Princess and the Pirate (1944) as Palace Guard (uncredited)
- The Wistful Widow of Wagon Gap (1947) as Townsman (uncredited)
- The Lady from Shanghai (1947) as Guard (uncredited)
- Valley of Fear (1947) as Jamison Forbes
- The Walls of Jericho (1948) as Court Reporter (uncredited)
- Up in Central Park (1948) as Politician (uncredited)
- Samson and Delilah (1949) as Gnarled Worker (uncredited)
- My Foolish Heart (1949) as Conductor (uncredited)
- Storm Warning (1951) as Townsman (uncredited)
