= Wolves of the Range =

1943 film by Sam Newfield

- Theatrical release poster
- Directed by: Sam Newfield
- Written by: Joseph O'Donnell (original story and screenplay)
- Produced by: Sigmund Neufeld (producer)
- Starring: See below
- Edited by: Holbrook N. Todd
- Release date: June 21, 1943
- Running time: 60 minutes
- Country: United States
- Language: English

Wolves of the Range is a 1943 American Western film directed by Sam Newfield and written by Joseph O'Donnell. The film stars Robert Livingston as the Lone Rider and Al St. John as his sidekick "Fuzzy" Jones, with Frances Gladwin, I. Stanford Jolley, Karl Hackett and Ed Cassidy. The film was released on June 21, 1943, by Producers Releasing Corporation.

This is the fifteenth movie in the Lone Rider series, and the fourth starring Robert Livingston. The first eleven movies star George Houston.

== Plot ==
Rocky carries $50,000 through the old Pony Express Trail to save a bank from ruin. He's set upon by bandits, and manages to hide the money before falling unconscious. When Fuzzy finds him, Rocky can't remember where he hid the money, and is jailed as a thief.

== Cast ==
- Robert Livingston as Rocky Cameron, the Lone Rider
- Al St. John as "Fuzzy" Jones
- Frances Gladwin as Ann Brady
- I. Stanford Jolley as Harry Dorn
- Karl Hackett as Bob Corrigan
- Ed Cassidy as Dan Brady
- Jack Ingram as Henchman Jack Hammond
- Kenne Duncan as Henchman Adams
- Budd Buster as Ben Foster
- Robert F. Hill as Judge Brandon

== See also ==
The Lone Rider films starring George Houston:

- The Lone Rider Rides On (1941)
- The Lone Rider Crosses the Rio (1941)
- The Lone Rider in Ghost Town (1941)
- The Lone Rider in Frontier Fury (1941)
- The Lone Rider Ambushed (1941)
- The Lone Rider Fights Back (1941)
- The Lone Rider and the Bandit (1942)
- The Lone Rider in Cheyenne (1942)
- The Lone Rider in Texas Justice (1942)
- Border Roundup (1942)
- Outlaws of Boulder Pass (1942)

starring Robert Livingston:

- Overland Stagecoach (1942)
- Wild Horse Rustlers (1943)
- Death Rides the Plains (1943)
- Wolves of the Range (1943)
- Law of the Saddle (1943)
- Raiders of Red Gap (1943)
