= Law of the Saddle =

1943 film

- Theatrical release poster
- Directed by: Melville De Lay
- Screenplay by: Fred Myton
- Produced by: Sigmund Neufeld
- Starring: Robert Livingston; Al St. John; Betty Miles; Lane Chandler; John Elliott; Reed Howes
- Cinematography: Robert E. Cline
- Edited by: Holbrook N. Todd
- Production company: Sigmund Neufeld Productions
- Distributed by: Producers Releasing Corporation
- Release date: July 20, 1943
- Running time: 59 minutes
- Country: United States
- Language: English

Law of the Saddle is a 1943 American Western film directed by Melville De Lay and written by Fred Myton. The film stars Robert Livingston as the Lone Rider and Al St. John as his sidekick "Fuzzy Jones", with Betty Miles, Lane Chandler, John Elliott and Reed Howes. The film was released on July 20, 1943, by Producers Releasing Corporation.

This is the sixteenth movie in the Lone Rider series, and the fifth starring Robert Livingston. The first eleven movies star George Houston.

== Plot ==
Rocky tries to clean out a gang of cattle rustlers, but finds that the leader of the gang is the town's Sheriff.

== Cast ==
- Robert Livingston as Rocky Cameron, the Lone Rider
- Al St. John as Fuzzy Jones
- Betty Miles as Gayle Kirby
- Lane Chandler as Steve Kinney
- John Elliott as Dan Kirby
- Reed Howes as Dave Barstowe
- Curley Dresden as Joe
- Al Ferguson as Bart
- Frank Ellis as Vic Dawson

== See also ==
The Lone Rider films starring George Houston:

- The Lone Rider Rides On (1941)
- The Lone Rider Crosses the Rio (1941)
- The Lone Rider in Ghost Town (1941)
- The Lone Rider in Frontier Fury (1941)
- The Lone Rider Ambushed (1941)
- The Lone Rider Fights Back (1941)
- The Lone Rider and the Bandit (1942)
- The Lone Rider in Cheyenne (1942)
- The Lone Rider in Texas Justice (1942)
- Border Roundup (1942)
- Outlaws of Boulder Pass (1942)

starring Robert Livingston:

- Overland Stagecoach (1942)
- Wild Horse Rustlers (1943)
- Death Rides the Plains (1943)
- Wolves of the Range (1943)
- Law of the Saddle (1943)
- Raiders of Red Gap (1943)
