= Raiders of Red Gap =

1943 film directed by Sam Newfield

- Theatrical release poster
- Directed by: Sam Newfield
- Screenplay by: Joseph O'Donnell
- Produced by: Sigmund Neufeld
- Starring: Robert Livingston; Al St. John; Myrna Dell; Ed Cassidy; Charles King; Kermit Maynard
- Cinematography: Robert E. Cline
- Edited by: Holbrook N. Todd
- Production company: Sigmund Neufeld Productions
- Distributed by: Producers Releasing Corporation
- Release date: September 30, 1943
- Running time: 57 minutes
- Country: United States
- Language: English

Raiders of Red Gap is a 1943 American Western film directed by Sam Newfield and written by Joseph O'Donnell. The film stars Robert Livingston as the Lone Rider and Al St. John as his sidekick "Fuzzy Jones", with Myrna Dell, Ed Cassidy, Charles King and Kermit Maynard. The film was released on September 30, 1943, by Producers Releasing Corporation.

This is the seventeenth and last movie in the Lone Rider series, and the sixth starring Robert Livingston. The first eleven movies star George Houston.

After this film, Livingston returned to Republic Pictures to replace Eddie Dew in the "John Paul Revere" series, starting with Pride of the Plains. PRC dropped the "Lone Rider" series, but continued two other series: the "Billy the Kid" films and the "Texas Rangers" series.

== Plot ==
A group of ranchers fight back against a crooked cattle syndicate trying to drive them off their land. The head of the syndicate hires a gunslinger to take care of the ranchers, but the hired gun is actually Fuzzy Jones in disguise.

== Cast ==
- Robert Livingston as Rocky Cameron, the Lone Rider
- Al St. John as Fuzzy Q. Jones
- Myrna Dell as Jane Roberts
- Ed Cassidy as Jim Roberts
- Charles King as Jack Bennett
- Kermit Maynard as Bradley
- Roy Brent as Butch Crane
- Frank Ellis as Jed
- George Chesebro as Sheriff Evans

== See also ==
The Lone Rider films starring George Houston:

- The Lone Rider Rides On (1941)
- The Lone Rider Crosses the Rio (1941)
- The Lone Rider in Ghost Town (1941)
- The Lone Rider in Frontier Fury (1941)
- The Lone Rider Ambushed (1941)
- The Lone Rider Fights Back (1941)
- The Lone Rider and the Bandit (1942)
- The Lone Rider in Cheyenne (1942)
- The Lone Rider in Texas Justice (1942)
- Border Roundup (1942)
- Outlaws of Boulder Pass (1942)

starring Robert Livingston:

- Overland Stagecoach (1942)
- Wild Horse Rustlers (1943)
- Death Rides the Plains (1943)
- Wolves of the Range (1943)
- Law of the Saddle (1943)
- Raiders of Red Gap (1943)
