= Death Rides the Plains =

1943 film

- Theatrical release poster
- Directed by: Sam Newfield
- Screenplay by: Joseph O'Donnell
- Story by: Patricia Harper
- Produced by: Sigmund Neufeld
- Starring: Robert Livingston; Al St. John; Patti McCarty; Ray Bennett; I. Stanford Jolley; George Chesebro
- Cinematography: Robert E. Cline
- Edited by: Holbrook N. Todd
- Production company: Sigmund Neufeld Productions
- Distributed by: Producers Releasing Corporation
- Release date: May 7, 1943
- Running time: 53 minutes
- Country: United States
- Language: English

Death Rides the Plains is a 1943 American Western film directed by Sam Newfield and written by Joseph O'Donnell. The film stars Robert Livingston as the Lone Rider and Al St. John as his sidekick "Fuzzy Jones", with Patti McCarty, Ray Bennett, I. Stanford Jolley and George Chesebro. The film was released on May 7, 1943, by Producers Releasing Corporation.

This is the fourteenth movie in the Lone Rider series, and the third starring Robert Livingston. The first eleven movies star George Houston.

== Plot ==
A gang of crooks is repeatedly selling the Circle C Ranch, and then murdering the buyers before they take possession of the land. Fuzzy's cousin Luke falls victim to the scheme, and the Lone Rider disguises himself as an outlaw to bring the schemers to justice.

== Cast ==
- Robert Livingston as Rocky Cameron, the Lone Rider
- Al St. John as Fuzzy Jones
- Patti McCarty as Virginia Marshall
- Ray Bennett as Ben Gowdey
- I. Stanford Jolley as Rogan
- George Chesebro as Trent
- John Elliott as James Marshall
- Kermit Maynard as Jed
- Slim Whitaker as Sheriff
- Karl Hackett as Edward Simms

== See also ==
The Lone Rider films starring George Houston:

- The Lone Rider Rides On (1941)
- The Lone Rider Crosses the Rio (1941)
- The Lone Rider in Ghost Town (1941)
- The Lone Rider in Frontier Fury (1941)
- The Lone Rider Ambushed (1941)
- The Lone Rider Fights Back (1941)
- The Lone Rider and the Bandit (1942)
- The Lone Rider in Cheyenne (1942)
- The Lone Rider in Texas Justice (1942)
- Border Roundup (1942)
- Outlaws of Boulder Pass (1942)

starring Robert Livingston:

- Overland Stagecoach (1942)
- Wild Horse Rustlers (1943)
- Death Rides the Plains (1943)
- Wolves of the Range (1943)
- Law of the Saddle (1943)
- Raiders of Red Gap (1943)
