= Wild Horse Rustlers =

1943 American Western film

- Theatrical release poster
- Directed by: Sam Newfield
- Screenplay by: Joseph O'Donnell
- Produced by: Sigmund Neufeld
- Starring: Robert Livingston; Al St. John; Lane Chandler; Linda Leighton; Frank Ellis; Stanley Price
- Cinematography: Robert E. Cline
- Edited by: Holbrook N. Todd
- Music by: Leo Erdody
- Production company: Sigmund Neufeld Productions
- Distributed by: Producers Releasing Corporation
- Release date: February 12, 1943
- Running time: 58 minutes
- Country: United States
- Language: English

Wild Horse Rustlers is a 1943 American Western film directed by Sam Newfield and written by Joseph O'Donnell. The film stars Robert Livingston as the Lone Rider and Al St. John as his sidekick "Fuzzy Jones", with Lane Chandler, Linda Leighton, Frank Ellis and Stanley Price. The film was released on February 12, 1943, by Producers Releasing Corporation.

This is the thirteenth movie in the Lone Rider series, and the second starring Robert Livingston. The first eleven movies star George Houston.

== Plot ==
Tom Cameron, the Lone Rider, discovers that a gang of Nazi spies are interfering with the federal government's plans to round up horses for military service—and, worse, that his own twin brother is helping them.

== Cast ==
- Robert Livingston as Tom Cameron, the Lone Rider
- Al St. John as Fuzzy Q. Jones
- Lane Chandler as Smoky Moore / Hans Beckmann
- Linda Leighton as Ellen Walden
- Frank Ellis as Jake Greene
- Stanley Price as Bruce Collins
- Karl Hackett as The Sheriff
- Jimmy Aubrey as Jail Guard
- Robert F. Hill as Judge

== Continuity ==
The murder of Tom Cameron's family was a major plot point in the first "Lone Rider" movie, The Lone Rider Rides On. In that movie, the reveal that Tom's brother had survived was the movie's big twist. His brother sacrificed himself heroically at the end of the movie, with no mention that Tom had another surviving twin brother.

== Reception ==
According to media historian Hal Erickson, "Wild Horse Rustlers was PRC's 1943 entry in the "Nazis on the prairie" western cycle... Minus the propaganda angle, this is merely another cattle-rustling opus, with the standard western bad guys saying "Seig heil!" instead of "Let's get outta here!" As was usual at PRC, Al "Fuzzy"St. John provides the film's best moments."

== See also ==
The Lone Rider films starring George Houston:

- The Lone Rider Rides On (1941)
- The Lone Rider Crosses the Rio (1941)
- The Lone Rider in Ghost Town (1941)
- The Lone Rider in Frontier Fury (1941)
- The Lone Rider Ambushed (1941)
- The Lone Rider Fights Back (1941)
- The Lone Rider and the Bandit (1942)
- The Lone Rider in Cheyenne (1942)
- The Lone Rider in Texas Justice (1942)
- Border Roundup (1942)
- Outlaws of Boulder Pass (1942)

starring Robert Livingston:

- Overland Stagecoach (1942)
- Wild Horse Rustlers (1943)
- Death Rides the Plains (1943)
- Wolves of the Range (1943)
- Law of the Saddle (1943)
- Raiders of Red Gap (1943)
