= Leo Erdody =

- Born: Leo Erdody; December 17, 1888; Chicago, United States
- Died: April 5, 1949 (aged 60) Los Angeles, U.S.
- Genres: Film score
- Occupations: Composer, conductor

Leo Erdody (December 17, 1888 – April 5, 1949), sometimes billed simply as 'Erdody,' was an American film composer. He studied music in Germany, and later went to Hollywood, scoring his first film in 1921. He later joined Producers Releasing Corporation and scored several films for them. For his work on Minstrel Man, he was a nominee for an Academy Award for Best Original Score.

== Early life and career ==
Erdody was born in Chicago on December 17, 1888. His father was a conductor in Hungary. It was possible that Leo had noble ancestry, which is why he occasionally billed himself solely by his surname. Erdody studied in Berlin under teachers including Joseph Joachim and Max Bruch. He worked in Europe for an early part of his career, but soon returned to the United States.

Erdody's first work as composer was the 1928 film Lilac Time. In 1941, he scored the film Under Fiesta Stars. He joined Producers Releasing Corporation in 1942 and scored several films for them, creating music for Tomorrow We Live, Overland Stagecoach, Queen of Broadway, Hitler – Dead or Alive, and Baby Face Morgan that year. In 1943, he scored several films including Jive Junction, Western Cyclone, Wild Horse Rustlers, and Isle of Forgotten Sins.

Erdody had a noted collaboration with director Edgar G. Ulmer, with Erdody scoring several of Ulmer's films, including Bluebeard, Strange Illusion, and Detour. In 1944, Erdody, along with composer Ferde Grofé, received Academy Award for Best Original Score nominations for their work on Minstrel Man. He continued scoring films for another four years. His final film was the Sam Newfield-directed Miraculous Journey.

== Death ==
Erdody died of arteriosclerosis in 1949, in Los Angeles. His death was noted to have occurred "very suddenly". It was noted that Erdody's death was a "tragedy" for Edgar G. Ulmer and that Ulmer "didn't really get over it ever."

== Selected filmography ==
- Queen of Broadway (1942)
- Dead Men Walk (1943)
- Detour (1945)
- Gas House Kids (1946)
- I Ring Doorbells (1946)
- Lady at Midnight (1948)
