= Overland Stagecoach =

1942 film directed by Sam Newfield

- Theatrical release poster
- Directed by: Sam Newfield
- Screenplay by: Fred Myton
- Produced by: Sigmund Neufeld
- Starring: Robert Livingston; Al St. John; Dennis Moore; Julie Duncan; Glenn Strange; Ted Adams
- Cinematography: Jack Greenhalgh
- Edited by: Holbrook N. Todd
- Music by: Leo Erdody
- Production company: Sigmund Neufeld Productions
- Distributed by: Producers Releasing Corporation
- Release date: October 11, 1942
- Running time: 58 minutes
- Country: United States
- Language: English

Overland Stagecoach is a 1942 American Western film directed by Sam Newfield and written by Fred Myton. The film stars Robert Livingston as the Lone Rider, Al St. John as his sidekick "Fuzzy" Jones, and Dennis Moore as Sheriff Smoky Moore, with Julie Duncan, Glenn Strange and Ted Adams. The film was released on October 11, 1942, by Producers Releasing Corporation.

This is the twelfth movie in the Lone Rider series, and the first starring Robert Livingston. The first eleven movies star George Houston.

This was the last film in the series to feature Dennis Moore as Sheriff Smoky Moore; he co-starred in six of the Lone Rider films, beginning with 1942's The Lone Rider and the Bandit.

== Plot ==
"Fuzzy" Jones gets a job as a driver for the Pioneer Stagecoach Company, and he learns that the stagecoach company's owners, Jeff Clark and Harland Kent, are opposing the construction of a new railroad line through the area. Jeff Clark is killed in a gunfight with some outlaws. Before he dies, he tells "Fuzzy" to send for his daughter, Susan, who is also a partner in the stage line. Little does anyone know that Kent was actually behind Jeff's murder.

Now with Jeff out of the way, Kent is scheming to steal Susan's share of the company. "Fuzzy" becomes suspicious and sends for his friend, Tom Cameron/ The Lone Rider. Smoky Moore, foreman of the proposed railroad company, is also a friend of Fuzzy's. Susan arrives in town, actually driving the stagecoach herself. Kent has his henchmen sabotage both the railroad company and the stagecoach company, and each side is blaming the other. The Lone Rider and "Fuzzy" try to find who is really causing all the trouble. It's not long before Kent frames the Lone Rider and Fuzzy for murder, forcing the two heroes to become fugitives from the law.

== Cast ==
- Robert Livingston as Tom Cameron, the Lone Rider
- Al St. John as Fuzzy Q. Jones
- Dennis Moore as Smoky Moore, foreman of the railroad
- John Elliott as Jeff Clark
- Julie Duncan as Susan Clark (Jeff's daughter)
- Glenn Strange as Harlen Kent, the villain
- Ted Adams as Sheriff
- Julian Rivero as Pedro, the bar owner
- Budd Buster as Pete (henchman)
- Art Mix as Jitters (henchman)
- Charles King as Jake, a railroad worker

== See also ==
The Lone Rider films starring George Houston:

- The Lone Rider Rides On (1941) released on DVD as Rider of the Plains
- The Lone Rider Crosses the Rio (1941)
- The Lone Rider in Ghost Town (1941) released on DVD as Ghost Mine
- The Lone Rider in Frontier Fury (1941)
- The Lone Rider Ambushed (1941) released on DVD as Trapped in the Badlands
- The Lone Rider Fights Back (1941)
- The Lone Rider and the Bandit (1942)
- The Lone Rider in Cheyenne (1942)
- The Lone Rider in Texas Justice (1942)
- Border Roundup (1942)
- Outlaws of Boulder Pass (1942)

starring Robert Livingston:

- Overland Stagecoach (1942)
- Wild Horse Rustlers (1943)
- Death Rides the Plains (1943)
- Wolves of the Range (1943)
- Law of the Saddle (1943)
- Raiders of Red Gap (1943)
