= Patricia Harper (screenwriter) =

American screenwriter and actress

- Born: Frances Persotia Harper; February 21, 1908; Warren, Indiana, USA
- Died: April 15, 1979 (aged 71); San Diego, California
- Occupation: Screenwriter
- Spouses: Gordon Eskridge (divorced): George Johnson Ross

Patricia Harper (born Frances Persotia Harper; February 21, 1908 – April 15, 1979) was an American screenwriter and actress who wrote B-Westerns in the 1930s and 1940s.

== Biography ==
=== Origins ===
A native of Indiana, Harper was born to Thaddeus S. Harper and Eunice Bennett in 1908. She was raised primarily in Oklahoma City, where she met and married Gordon Eskridge in 1927. The pair had a son and divorced less than two years later.

=== Hollywood career ===
Patricia's parents raised her son while she attended art school and moved further west to seek work as a writer and actress. Soon after arriving in Hollywood, she appeared in a string of smaller roles, but more importantly, she forged a promising career for herself as a screenwriter. She'd pen more than a dozen Westerns between 1938 and 1947. She later said she decided to go by Patricia because no one believed Persotia was a real name.

=== Relationships ===
She was rumored to be engaged to Jesse Lasky Jr. in the early 1930s, but Lasky later said they had just been friends. She married advertising executive George Johnson Ross in 1947.

== Selected filmography ==
- Ghost Town Renegades (1947)
- Border Feud (1947)
- Range Beyond the Blue (1947)
- The Scarlet Horseman (1946)
- Code of the Lawless (1945)
- Secret Agent X-9 (1945)
- The Topeka Terror (1945)
- My Gal Loves Music (1944)
- Trail to Gunsight (1944)
- Trigger Trail (1944)
- The Drifter (1944)
- Blazing Frontier (1943)
- Black Market Rustlers (1943)
- Western Cyclone (1943)
- Death Rides the Plains (1943)
- Riders of San Joaquin (1943)
- Prairie Pals (1942)
- Western Jamboree (1938)
