= Joseph O'Donnell (screenwriter) =

American screenwriter (1891–1963)

- Born: January 4, 1891; New York City, New York, United States
- Died: December 11, 1963 (aged 72); Los Angeles, California, United States
- Occupation: Writer
- Years active: 1934–1966 (film & TV)

Joseph O'Donnell (1891–1963) was an American screenwriter. He worked for a variety of studios on Poverty Row during the 1930s, mainly on westerns.

== Filmography ==
- Public Stenographer (1933)
- The Moth (1934)
- Bulldog Courage (1935)
- Trails of the Wild (1935)
- Timber War (1935)
- Racing Luck (1935)
- Manhattan Butterfly (1935)
- Murder by Television (1935)
- His Fighting Blood (1935)
- Racing Blood (1936)
- Wild Horse Round-Up (1936)
- Ghost Patrol (1936)
- Wildcat Trooper (1936)
- Born to Fight (1936)
- Aces and Eights (1936)
- Border Caballero (1936)
- Phantom Patrol (1936)
- The Traitor (1936)
- Vengeance of Rannah (1936)
- Roarin' Guns (1936)
- Lightnin' Bill Carson (1936)
- The Fighting Texan (1937)
- Rich Relations (1937)
- Young Dynamite (1937)
- Whistling Bullets (1937)
- Anything for a Thrill (1937)
- North of the Rio Grande (1937)
- Thanks for Listening (1937)
- Land of Fighting Men (1938)
- Songs and Bullets (1938)
- Phantom Ranger (1938)
- Reform School (1939)
- The Adventures of the Masked Phantom (1939)
- Port of Hate (1939)
- The Invisible Killer (1939)
- Flaming Lead (1939)
- Straight Shooter (1939)
- While Thousands Cheer (1940)
- Riders of Black Mountain (1940)
- Gun Code (1940)
- Texas Renegades (1940)
- Billy the Kid in Texas (1940)
- Billy the Kid's Gun Justice (1940)
- The Lone Rider Fights Back (1941)
- The Lone Rider in Ghost Town (1941)
- The Lone Rider Rides On (1941)
- Billy the Kid in Santa Fe (1941)
- Billy the Kid Trapped (1942)
- Border Roundup (1942)
- Devil Riders (1943)
- Death Rides the Plains (1943)
- Wolves of the Range (1943)
- Cattle Stampede (1943)
- Wild Horse Rustlers (1943)
- Raiders of Red Gap (1943)
- Law of the Valley (1944)
- Valley of Vengeance (1944)
- Land of the Outlaws (1944)
- Rustlers' Hideout (1944)
- Tucson Raiders (1944)
- Marshal of Reno (1944)
- Frontier Outlaws (1944)
- Border Feud (1947)
- Return of the Lash (1947)
- Check Your Guns (1948)
- Stagecoach Driver (1951)
- Prairie Roundup (1951)
- Nevada Badmen (1951)
- Oklahoma Justice (1951)
- Man from the Black Hills (1952)

== Bibliography ==
- Pitts, Michael R. Poverty Row Studios, 1929–1940: An Illustrated History of 55 Independent Film Companies, with a Filmography for Each. McFarland & Company, 2005.
