= Special Delivery (1922 film) =

1922 film

- Directed by: Roscoe Arbuckle (uncredited)
- Starring: Al St. John
- Distributed by: Fox Film Corporation
- Release date: April 30, 1922
- Country: United States
- Language: Silent (English intertitles)

Special Delivery is a 1922 American comedy film directed by Roscoe Arbuckle. It was Arbuckle's first film as a director, albeit uncredited, following his acquittal of the manslaughter of Virginia Rappe. A print of the film survives in the film archive of the Museum of Modern Art.

== Plot ==
As described in a film magazine, Al is told to deliver a radiophone message to a certain businessman. A gang of wicked looking plotters endeavor to capture him and steal the message. After a long chase involving Al's trick bicycle, the Sunshine lions of Fox studios, and scenes at the top of a tall building, Al safely delivers the message and the thugs are arrested.

== Cast ==
- Al St. John
- Vernon Dent
- Billy Engle
- Tiny Ward
