= Return of the Lash =

1947 film by Ray Taylor

- Theatrical release poster
- Directed by: Ray Taylor
- Screenplay by: Joseph O'Donnell
- Produced by: Jerry Thomas
- Starring: Lash LaRue; Al St. John; Mary Maynard; Buster Slaven; George Chesebro; Lee Morgan
- Cinematography: Ernest Miller
- Edited by: Hugh Winn
- Music by: Walter Greene
- Production company: Producers Releasing Corporation
- Distributed by: Producers Releasing Corporation
- Release date: October 11, 1947
- Running time: 53 minutes
- Country: United States
- Language: English

Return of the Lash is a 1947 American Western film directed by Ray Taylor and written by Joseph O'Donnell. The film stars Lash LaRue, Al St. John, Mary Maynard, Buster Slaven, George Chesebro and Lee Morgan. The film was released on October 11, 1947, by Producers Releasing Corporation.

== Cast ==
- Lash LaRue as Cheyenne Davis
- Al St. John as Fuzzy Q. Jones
- Mary Maynard as Kay Grant
- Buster Slaven as Tom Grant
- George Chesebro as Big Jim Kirby
- Lee Morgan as Dan Clark
- Lane Bradford as Dave
- Curley Gibson as Pete
- Dee Cooper as Hank
- Roy Butler as Sheriff
- George DeNormand as Jeff Harper
- Carl Mathews as Charlie
- Slim Whitaker as Bert
