= Public Stenographer =

- Directed by: Lew Collins
- Written by: Elwood Ullman; Joseph O'DonnellBr />Lew Collins
- Produced by: D. J. Mountan
- Starring: Buster Collier, Jr. Lola Lane
- Cinematography: George Meehan
- Edited by: Rose Smith
- Distributed by: Showmen's Pictures Inc. State Rights
- Release date: 1933
- Running time: 64 minutes
- Country: United States
- Language: English

Public Stenographer is a 1933 American pre-Code romantic comedy.

== Plot ==
Stenographer Ann McNair (Lane) en route to a job mistakenly gets in the wrong car and ends up at a wild party thrown by Jim Martin (Collier). While in pursuit of McNair, Martin is also engaged to a society heiress.

== Cast ==
- Buster Collier, Jr. – Jim Martin
- Lola Lane – Ann McNair
- Jason Robards, Sr. – Fred White
- Duncan Renaldo – Jerome Eagan
