= The Aero-Nut =

1920 film

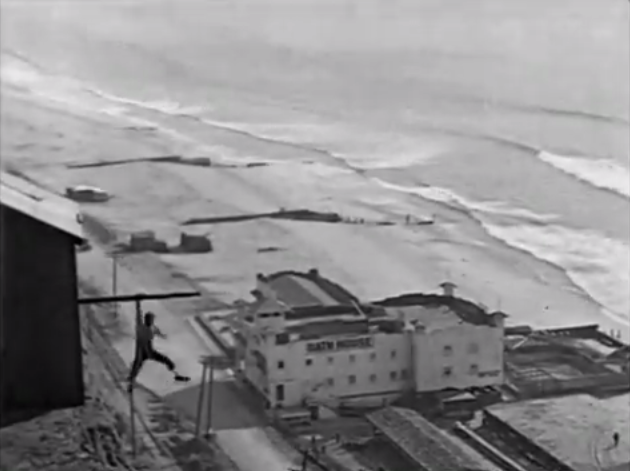
- The climactic scene of the film
- Directed by: Frank Griffith
- Produced by: Warner Bros.
- Starring: Al St. John
- Release date: May 1920
- Running time: 3 minutes survive of original 2 reels (25-30 minutes)
- Country: United States
- Language: Silent (English intertitles)

The Aero-Nut is a 1920 American two-reeler short comedy film starring Al St. John. Only a three-minute fragment of the production's footage currently survives.
