= Charles King (character actor) =

American film actor (1895–1957)

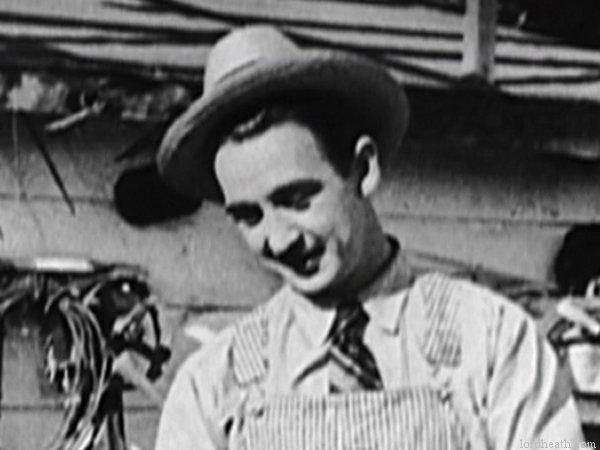
- King in 1925
- Born: Charles Lafayette King; February 21, 1895; Hillsboro, Texas, U.S.
- Died: May 7, 1957 (aged 62); Hollywood, California, U.S.
- Occupation: Actor
- Years active: 1915–1956

Charles Lafayette King (February 21, 1895 – May 7, 1957) was an American character actor and stuntman who appeared in more than 400 films between 1915 and 1956.

== Biography ==
King was born in Dallas, Texas, and died in Hollywood, California, from cirrhosis of the liver.

== Selected filmography ==
- The Birth of a Nation (1915)
- Singing River (1921)
- A Motion to Adjourn (1921)
- The Black Bag (1922)
- Merry-Go-Round (1923)
- Hearts of the West (1925)
- Range Courage (1927)
- Barnum & Ringling, Inc. (1928)
- Sisters of Eve (1928)
- The Dawn Trail (1930)
- Beyond the Law (1930)
- Branded Men (1931)
- Alias – the Bad Man (1931)
- The Pocatello Kid (1931)
- Two Gun Man (1931)
- Honor of the Mounted (1932)
- The Hurricane Express (1932)
- The Man from Arizona (1932)
- Outlaw Justice (1932)
- Young Blood (1932)
- The Fighting Champ (1932)
- The Gay Buckaroo (1932)
- Ghost City (1932)
- A Man's Land (1932)
- Strawberry Roan (1933)
- The Fighting Parson (1933)
- The Prescott Kid (1934)
- His Fighting Blood (1935)
- Mississippi (1935) - Desk Clerk
- Red Blood of Courage (1935)
- The Lawless Nineties (1936)
- Hearts in Bondage (1936)
- Shadow of Chinatown (1936)
- Idaho Kid (1936)
- Men of the Plains (1936)
- The Fighting Deputy (1937)
- The Gambling Terror (1937)
- Luck of Roaring Camp (1937)
- Riders of the Rockies (1937)
- Gun Packer (1938)
- Frontier Town (1938)
- Frontiers of '49 (1939)
- The Taming of the West (1939)
- Deadwood Dick (1940)
- Billy the Kid in Texas (1940)
- Billy the Kid's Gun Justice (1940)
- Lightning Strikes West (1940)
- Wild Horse Range (1940)
- Forbidden Trails (1941)
- Law of the Range (1941)
- The Lone Rider Crosses the Rio (1941)
- The Lone Rider in Ghost Town (1941)
- The Lone Rider Ambushed (1941)
- The Lone Rider Fights Back (1941)
- White Eagle (1941)
- Billy the Kid in Santa Fe (1941)
- Billy the Kid Wanted (1941)
- Billy the Kid's Round-Up (1941)
- Border Roundup (1942)
- Outlaws of Boulder Pass (1942)
- Overland Stagecoach (1942)
- Arizona Stage Coach (1942)
- Trail Riders (1942)
- Sheriff of Sage Valley (1942)
- Riders of the Rio Grande (1943)
- Raiders of Red Gap (1943)
- Two Fisted Justice (1943)
- Haunted Ranch (1943)
- Land of Hunted Men (1943)
- The Kid Rides Again (1943)
- Western Cyclone (1943)
- Cattle Stampede (1943)
- Devil Riders (1943)
- Dead or Alive (1944)
- The Great Mike (1944)
- Brand of the Devil (1944)
- Land of the Outlaws (1944)
- Arizona Whirlwind (1944)
- Frontier Outlaws (1944)
- Harmony Trail (1944)
- Valley of Vengeance (1944)
- Oath of Vengeance (1944)
- Fuzzy Settles Down (1944)
- Rustlers' Hideout (1944)
- Border Badmen (1945)
- Gangster's Den (1945)
- The Lady Confesses (1945)
- His Brother's Ghost (1945)
- Shadows of Death (1945)
- Outlaws of the Plains (1946)
- Ghost of Hidden Valley (1946)
- Prairie Badmen (1946)
- Brick Bradford (1947)
- Killer at Large (1947)
- Oklahoma Blues (1948)
- Adventures of Sir Galahad (1949)
- Gunsmoke - TV Series (1956–57) as a Townsman & a Trial Spectator (uncredited)
