= Frontier Scout (1938 film) =

1938 film directed by Sam Newfield

- Directed by: Sam Newfield
- Written by: Frances Guihan
- Produced by: Franklyn Warner; Maurice Conn
- Starring: See below
- Cinematography: Jack Greenhalgh
- Edited by: Richard G. Wray
- Production company: Fine Arts Pictures
- Distributed by: Grand National Pictures
- Release date: 16 September 1938
- Running time: 61 minutes
- Country: United States
- Language: English

Frontier Scout is a 1938 American Western film directed by Sam Newfield starring George Houston as Wild Bill Hickok. It was filmed in Kernville, California.

== Plot ==
After their daring activities in the Civil War, former Army scouts and spies Wild Bill Hickok, Whiney Roberts and Steve Norris head West. Norris is losing cattle as are all the other ranchers in the area due to a large group of cattle rustlers who also kill every lawman they can find. Undercover U.S. Marshal Hickok and his sidekick Whiney are sent out to clear up the situation.

== Cast ==
- George Houston as Wild Bill Hickok
- Al St. John as Whiney Roberts
- Beth Marion as Mary Ann Norris
- Stephen Chase as Mort Bennett
- Dave O'Brien as Steve Norris
- Jack C. Smith as General Ulysses S. Grant
- Budd Buster as Jones/the Bookkeeper
- Walter Byron as Lieutenant Adams
- Dorothy Fay as Julie
- Jack Ingram as One-Shot Folsom
- Minerva Urecal as Helen
- Kenne Duncan as Crandall
- Slim Whitaker as Davis
- Kit Guard as King
- Carl Mathews as Elliott
- Joseph W. Girard as Dr. Lawrence
- Frank LaRue as Mr. Norris
- Mantan Moreland as the Butler
- Bill Nestell as a Henchman
- Jim Thorpe as another Henchman

== See also ==
- List of films and television shows about the American Civil War
