= Dennis Moore (actor) =

American actor (1908-1964)

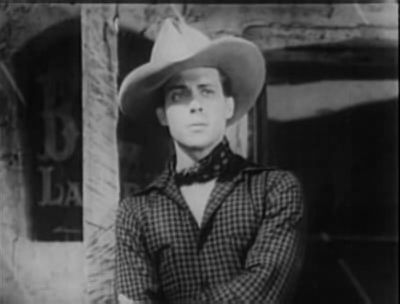
- Moore in The Dawn Rider (1935)
- Born: Dennis Meadows; January 26, 1908; Fort Worth, Texas, U.S.
- Died: March 1, 1964 (aged 56); San Bernardino, California, U.S.
- Other name: Denny Meadows
- Occupation: Actor
- Years active: 1932-1961
- Spouse: Marilyn Mason (1947-1964) (his death) (1 child)

Dennis Moore (January 26, 1908 – March 1, 1964) was an American actor best known for his many appearances in Western films and serials.

== Early years ==
Moore was born Dennis Meadows in Fort Worth, Texas, and attended schools in El Paso. He was active in aviation and had a pilot's license. Before going into films, he worked in stock theater.

A plane crash nearly ended his life. After more than a year spent in a hospital and two additional years of recovery, he could not pass the physical examination for a pilot's license, so he chose to change from aviation to acting.

== Career ==
Moore began appearing in short subjects and low-budget feature films in the 1930s under the name Denny Meadows. His first leading role, as Meadows, was in the half-hour featurette The West on Parade (1934), one of Bernard B. Ray's low-budget "Bud 'n' Ben" shorts that featured Ben Corbett as Ben opposite various cowboys as Bud.

Warner Bros. saw possibilities in the young actor and signed him to a contract in 1936, as well as changing his professional name to Dennis Moore. His early roles were prominent (in Down the Stretch and Here Comes Carter) but the rest of his Warner tenure was uneventful, as he played incidental, uncredited roles for the rest of his one-year contract. He returned to the smaller studios and found supporting roles in minor features. He did have a leading role in a western featurette filmed in Cinecolor, The Man from Tascosa (1939). This was an experimental, half-hour short produced by the Cinecolor company itself, to demonstrate its color process as a feasible alternative to Technicolor. The Man from Tascosa received more exposure in 1944, when Warner Bros. reprinted it in Cinecolor, edited it down to 20 minutes, and retitled it Wells Fargo Days.

Moore's dark looks and solemn demeanor kept him working steadily as an all-purpose utility player, in both heroic and villainous roles. Moore became a familiar face in Westerns, but never became a major star. In 1942, he co-starred for six films in PRC's Lone Rider series, beginning with The Lone Rider and the Bandit and ending with Overland Stagecoach.

Moore played leads or second leads in serials, and holds the distinction of having co-starred in the last serials ever produced by Universal Pictures (The Mysterious Mr. M, in 1946) and Columbia Pictures (Blazing the Overland Trail, in 1956). In 1956 he played a villainous role in the Bowery Boys comedy Hot Shots.

== Television ==
Dennis Moore also appeared on television in the syndicated The Range Rider, with Jock Mahoney and Dick Jones, in the 1955 CBS series Brave Eagle with Keith Larsen, and in the 1956 episode "Panhandle" of the CBS series Tales of the Texas Rangers, with Willard Parker and Harry Lauter.

He was cast as Mr. Finley in "The Gold Watch" and as Jeb in "A Permanent Juliet" on the NBC Western series Buckskin, starring Tom Nolan, Sally Brophy, and Mike Road. He was cast as Walker in the 1958 episode "Three Wanted Men" of the syndicated Western series Frontier Doctor, starring Rex Allen. At this time, he also made multiple appearances on Richard Carlson's syndicated Western series Mackenzie's Raiders.

Moore appeared in five episodes of Jack Webb's police procedural Dragnet. He also guest-starred on the syndicated adventure series Rescue 8, starring Jim Davis and Lang Jeffries, the crime drama U.S. Marshal, starring John Bromfield, and the NBC Western Riverboat, starring Darren McGavin.

== Later years ==
Moore moved with his family from Los Angeles to Big Bear Lake, operating a gift shop there.

== Death ==
On March 1, 1964, Moore died of rheumatic heart disease in San Bernardino, California.

== Selected filmography ==
- The Dawn Rider (1935)
- China Clipper (1936) as Engineer on Clipper
- Desert Justice (1936)
- Fugitive in the Sky (1936) Unbilled
- Irish Luck (1939)
- Overland Mail (1939)
- Girl from Rio (1939)
- Trigger Smith (1939) as Bud
- Boys of the City (1940) as Giles
- Fugitive from a Prison Camp (1940)
- Flying Wild (1941) as George
- Bowery Blitzkrieg (1941) as Dorgan
- Spooks Run Wild (1941) as Dr. Von Grosch
- The Lone Rider Fights Back (1941) as Al Williams
- Billy the Kid in Santa Fe (1941) as Silent Don Benson
- The Lone Rider and the Bandit (1942) as Sheriff Smoky Moore
- The Lone Rider in Cheyenne (1942) as Sheriff Smoky Moore
- The Lone Rider in Texas Justice (1942) as Sheriff Smoky Moore
- Border Roundup (1942) as Sheriff Smoky Moore
- Outlaws of Boulder Pass (1942) as Sheriff Smoky Moore
- Overland Stagecoach (1942) as Sheriff Smoky Moore
- Arizona Trail (1943)
- West of the Rio Grande (1944)
- The Mummy's Curse (1944) as Dr. James Halsey
- Song of the Range (1944) as Denny
- The Frozen Ghost (1945) Radio Show Announcer (uncredited)
- The Crime Doctor's Courage (1945) David Lee (uncredited)
- The Master Key (1945)
- Colorado Serenade (1946) as Duke Dillon
- Rainbow Over the Rockies (1947)
- Frontier Agent (1948)
- Range Renegades (1948)
- Across the Rio Grande (1949) as Carson
- Life of St. Paul series (1949) as Roman Centurion
- I Killed Geronimo (1950) as Henchman Luke
- Hot Rod (1950)
- Federal Man (1950) as Harry
- Snow Dog (1950) as LaFontaine Factor (uncredited)
- Gunslingers (1950) as Marshal Dean
- Yukon Manhunt (1951) as Henchman
- Blazing Bullets (1951) as Crowley - Henchman
- The Lusty Men (1952)
- The Shrike (1955) as spectator
- The White Squaw (1956) as rancher (uncredited)
- Friendly Persuasion (1956) Farmer (uncredited)
- Blazing the Overland Trail (1956) as Ed Marr, Pony Express relay station manager
- Hot Shots (1956) as Tony, ship's chandler
- The Phantom Stagecoach (1957) as Townsman
- The Restless Gun (1958) in Episode "The Manhunters"
- Bat Masterson (1959) as Tom
- Bat Masterson (1960) as Sheriff
- Bat Masterson (1961) as Hacker
