= George Houston (actor) =

American actor (1896–1944)

George F. Houston
- Born: George Fleming Houston; January 11, 1896; Hampton, New Jersey
- Died: November 12, 1944 (aged 48); Los Angeles, California
- Other name: George Byron
- Occupations: Film, stage actor
- Years active: 1934–1942
- Spouses: Leone Sousa (m. 1933; div. 1940) Virginia Card (died 1944)
- Military career
- Allegiance: United States of America
- Branch: United States Army
- Service years: 1917–1919

George Fleming Houston (January 11, 1896 – November 12, 1944) was an American B-western film actor and accomplished singer in the early half of the 20th century.

== Early life, World War I service ==
Born and raised in Hampton, New Jersey, his parents were Reverend Thomas Houston, a blind evangelist, and Mrs. Charles Houston. He attended Blair Academy, in New Jersey, where he ran track, then later he attended the Institute of Musical Arts, the original name for what would eventually become Juilliard School. Houston received two degrees, one in voice, and one for teaching music.

Houston joined the U.S. Army, serving in France during World War I, attached to the 17th French Division, in the Ambulance Service. His military service ran from June 5, 1917, to April 12, 1919.

In 1923 he began studying at the Eastman School of Music in Rochester. Houston garnered leading bass roles in such operas as Boris Godunov and Faust under the direction of Vladimir Rosing. Members of Rosing's opera department soon spun off into the American Opera Company, touring the United States and Canada successfully for several years until the Depression grounded the promising venture in 1930. Highlights for Houston included a performance of Carmen with guest artist Mary Garden, a season at the Guild Theater on Broadway and a performance for President Coolidge in Washington, D.C., in December 1927.

== Acting career ==
Houston's Broadway credits included The O'Flynn (1934), Caviar (1934), Shooting Star (1933), Melody (1933), A Modern Virgin (1931), The Venetian Glass Nephew (1931), Fioretta (1929), and Chee-Chee (1928).

After doing some stage acting on Broadway, Houston was enticed to try his acting skills in Hollywood by the early 1930s, hoping to win parts in singing films. He received small bit parts in six different films, but no roles that cast him in a starring role. After his sixth, he found himself unemployed.

On September 8, 1933, in New York City, Houston married Leone Sousa, a model and Ziegfeld girl. They later moved to Los Angeles, California. In 1936, Houston and Sousa performed together in the play Everyman, produced by the California Festival Association at the Hollywood Bowl and directed by Max Reinhardt. Houston was cast as Mephisto in another lavish Max Reinhardt production of Faust at the Pilgrimage Theatre in Hollywood in 1938.

In 1935, Houston was noticed by small production company Grand National Pictures, who hired him to play the lead role in a series of musical westerns including the 1936 film Captain Calamity and the 1938 film Frontier Scout. The 1938 film was successful and brought Houston to the notice of other production companies. That same year he would play a small role in Blockade with Henry Fonda and Madeleine Carroll, in which he was billed as "George Byron". In MGM's movie The Great Waltz, also released in 1938, he played the opera singer Fritz Schiller.

On February 21, 1940, Houston and Sousa divorced, after having parted on November 1, 1939. Sousa spoke about Houston in court: "He paid practically no attention to me. He'd go out socially without me and he wouldn't return until some time between 2 and 5 o'clock in the morning. [...] He was always having bills for champagne sent to our home. But I never saw the champagne." Sousa was awarded the divorce decree and Houston was made to pay her $200 a month in alimony until one of them died or Sousa remarried. Houston later married opera singer Virginia Card, who he stayed with until his death.

By 1940, following several failed film endeavors, Grand National Pictures was in trouble, and they went out of business soon after. Houston had been billed prior to this time by a new company, Producers Releasing Corporation, as the future character of Billy the Kid in an eight film series for that company. However, when it came time to film the series, Bob Steele was cast in the role for six episodes, and was replaced by Buster Crabbe following Steele's departure to Republic Pictures.

Despite his not being cast in the "Billy the Kid" role, PRC gave Houston his own series of films. He would make eleven films as "The Lone Rider", beginning with the 1941 film The Lone Rider Rides On, in which he sang the theme song in an equally rousing bass-baritone voice at the beginning and end. Al "Fuzzy" St. John played his sidekick in all eleven films. However, by the end of 1942, Houston was replaced by veteran actor Bob Livingston as the "Lone Rider." St. John and actor Dennis Moore would remain with the series.

== Death ==
Houston planned to return to his singing interests, but died unexpectedly on November 12, 1944. After a rehearsal of a film, Houston had a few drinks and collapsed from a heart attack. The police, thinking he was drunk, deposited him in the drunk tank. He then died either in the drunk tank or on the way to hospital. His wife, Virginia Card, was at the time starring in the Broadway hit Oklahoma!, which had just debuted in 1943. Houston was, at the time of his death, preparing to take his opera company on a nationwide tour.

George Houston was beloved as a voice teacher and coach by Howard Keel and John Raitt. Keel wrote in his autobiography Only Make Believe that Houston was "...like a father to me.", and described his death.

== Partial filmography ==
- The Melody Lingers On (1935)
- Captain Calamity (1936)
- Let's Sing Again (1936)
- Wallaby Jim of the Islands (1937)
- Conquest (1937) as Grand Marshal George Duroc
- Frontier Scout (1938) as Wild Bill Hickok
- The Great Waltz (1938) as Fritz Schiller
- The Howards of Virginia (1940) as George Washington
- Laughing at Danger (1940)

The "Lone Rider" films:

- The Lone Rider Rides On (1941)
- The Lone Rider Crosses the Rio (1941)
- The Lone Rider in Ghost Town (1941)
- The Lone Rider in Frontier Fury (1941)
- The Lone Rider Ambushed (1941)
- The Lone Rider Fights Back (1941)
- The Lone Rider and the Bandit (1942)
- The Lone Rider in Cheyenne (1942)
- Texas Justice (1942)
- Border Roundup (1942)
- Outlaws of Boulder Pass (1942)
