= Robert Livingston (actor) =

American actor (1904–1988)

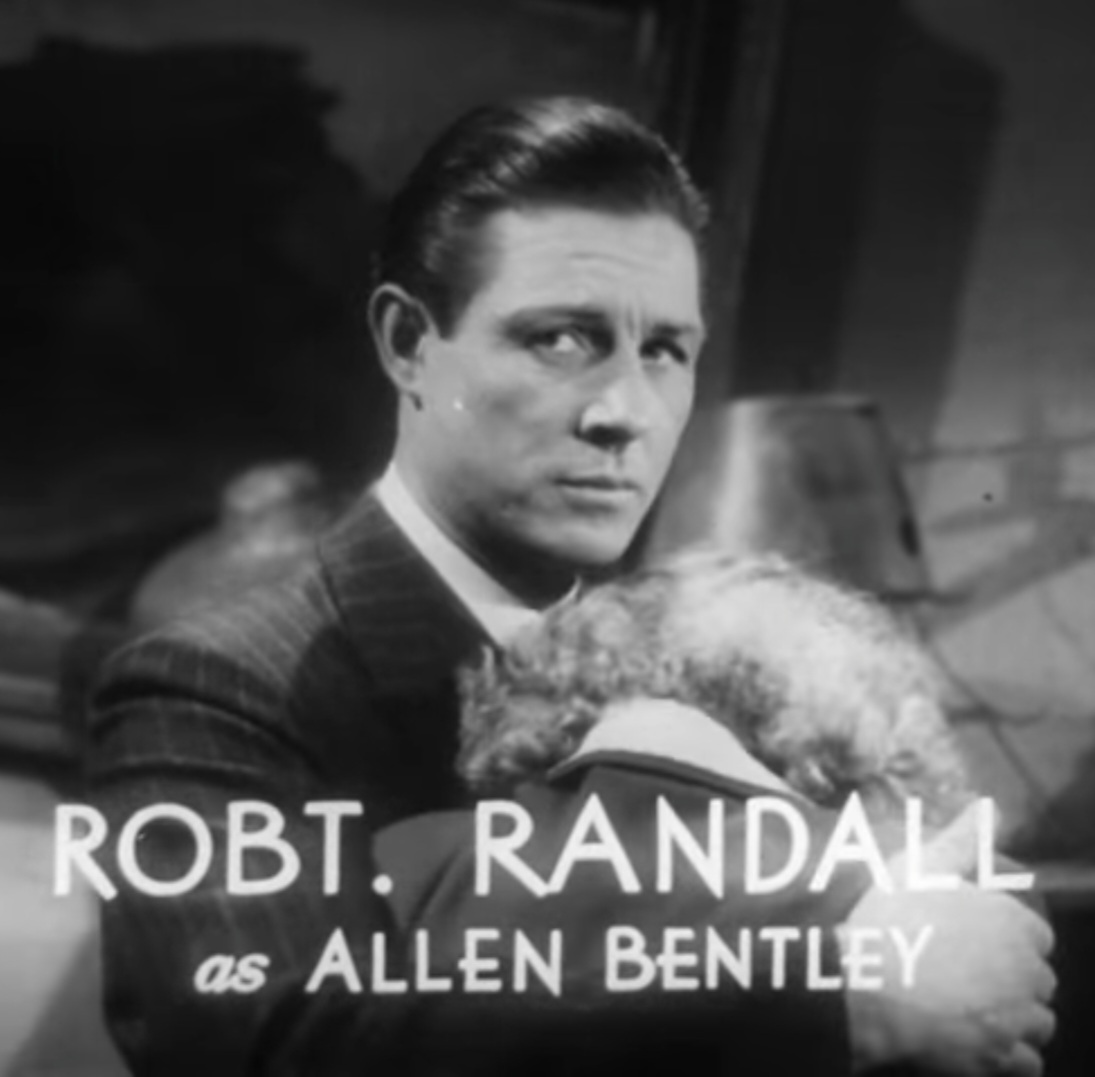
- Livingston (as Robert Randall) in The Black Raven (1943)
- Born: Robert Edward Randall; December 9, 1904; Quincy, Illinois, U.S.
- Died: March 7, 1988 (aged 83); Tarzana, California, U.S.
- Resting place: Forest Lawn Memorial Park, Glendale, California
- Other name: Bob Livingston
- Occupation: Actor
- Years active: 1921–1975
- Spouse: Margaret Roach (m. 1947; div. 1951)
- Children: 1
- Relatives: Jack Randall (brother); Hal Roach (father-in-law)

Robert Edward Randall (December 9, 1904 – March 7, 1988) was an American film actor known under his stage name, Robert Livingston. He appeared in 136 films between 1921 and 1975. He was one of the original Three Mesquiteers. He also played The Lone Ranger and Zorro.

== Life and career ==
Livingston was born in Quincy, Illinois, and died in Tarzana, California, from emphysema at age 83.

Often billed as "Bob Livingston," he was the original "Stony Brooke" in the "Three Mesquiteers" Western B-movie series, a role later played by John Wayne for eight films. He also portrayed Zorro in The Bold Caballero (1936) and The Lone Ranger in the 1939 film serial The Lone Ranger Rides Again directed by William Witney and co-starring Chief Thundercloud as Tonto. Livingston also appeared as the title character in The Lone Rider series, starring alongside sidekicks Al "Fuzzy" St. John and Dennis "Smoky" Moore. The role of the Rider had previously been played by George Houston.

== Personal life ==
On December 18, 1947, he married Margaret Roach, daughter of director/producer Hal Roach. Together they had one son, actor and writer Addison Randall (b. 1949). He is buried in Forest Lawn Memorial Park, Glendale, California.

== Selected filmography ==
- Man-Woman-Marriage (1921) - (uncredited)
- The Queen of Sheba (1921) - (uncredited)
- Brown of Harvard (1926) - Harvard Student / Yale Cheering Section / Harvard Spectator (uncredited)
- Aloma of the South Seas (1926) - Swimmer (uncredited)
- Old Ironsides (1926) - Seaman (uncredited)
- Casey at the Bat (1927) - Male Chorus Member, Sextette Number (uncredited)
- Special Delivery (1927) - Postal Ball Guest (uncredited)
- Wings (1927) - Recruit in Examination Office (uncredited)
- Man, Woman and Sin (1927) - Dancer
- Vamping Venus (1928) - Soldier
- Our Dancing Daughters (1928) - Party Boy (uncredited)
- Redskin (1929) - Student (uncredited)
- College Love (1929) - (uncredited)
- Rio Rita (1929) - Dancer (uncredited)
- Why Bring That Up? (1929) - Chorus Boy (uncredited)
- Hit the Deck (1929) - Sailor / Chorus Member (uncredited)
- Sunny Skies (1930) - Dave
- Hot Curves (1930) - Baseball Player
- Dixiana (1930) - Circus Troupe / Bachelor Party / Plantation Party (uncredited)
- Borrowed Wives (1930) - Joe Blair
- Dance, Fools, Dance (1931) - Jack (uncredited)
- Strangers May Kiss (1931)
- Shipmates (1931) - Man on Patio Escorting Girls (uncredited)
- Neck and Neck (1931)
- Night World (1932) - Nightclub Patron (uncredited)
- Paris Interlude (1934) - Reporter (uncredited)
- Death on the Diamond (1934) - Higgins
- Evelyn Prentice (1934) - Reporter (uncredited)
- The Band Plays On (1934) - Bob Stone
- Buried Loot (1935, Short) - Bob (uncredited)
- West Point of the Air (1935) - Pippinger
- Baby Face Harrington (1935) - George
- Murder in the Fleet (1935) - Dr. Spencer (uncredited)
- Mutiny on the Bounty (1935) - Lt. Young (uncredited)
- Whipsaw (1935) - Airline Steward / Radio Announcer in Trailer (uncredited)
- Tough Guy (1936) - (uncredited)
- Three Godfathers (1936) - Frank Benson
- Small Town Girl (1936) - Wedding Celebrant (uncredited)
- Absolute Quiet (1936) - Co-Pilot
- Speed (1936) - George Saunders (uncredited)
- Suzy (1936) - Pierre (uncredited)
- Women Are Trouble (1936) - Hotel Clerk (uncredited)
- The Vigilantes Are Coming (1936, Serial) - Don Loring, The Eagle
- The Three Mesquiteers (1936) - Stony Brooke
- Ghost-Town Gold (1936) - Stony Brooke
- The Bold Caballero (1936) – Don Diego Vega / Zorro
- Roarin' Lead (1936) - Stony Brooke
- Riders of the Whistling Skull (1937) - Stony Brooke
- Larceny on the Air (1937) - Dr. Lawrence Baxter
- Circus Girl (1937) - Bob McAvoy
- Hit the Saddle (1937) - Stony Brooke
- Gunsmoke Ranch (1937) - Stony Brooke
- Come On, Cowboys (1937) - Stony Brooke
- Range Defenders (1937) - Stony Brooke
- Heart of the Rockies (1937) - Stony Brooke
- Wild Horse Rodeo (1937) - Stony Brooke
- The Purple Vigilantes (1938) - Stony Brooke
- Call the Mesquiteers (1938) - Stony Brooke
- Arson Gang Busters (1938) - Bill O'Connell
- Outlaws of Sonora (1938) - Stony Brooke / Dude Brannen
- Ladies in Distress (1938) - Pete Braddock
- Riders of the Black Hills (1938) - Stony Brooke
- Heroes of the Hills (1938) - Stony Brooke
- The Night Hawk (1938) - Slim Torrence
- Orphans of the Street (1938) - Bob Clayton
- Federal Man-Hunt (1938) - Bill Hasford
- The Lone Ranger Rides Again (1939) - The Lone Ranger / Bill Andrews
- The Kansas Terrors (1939) - Stony Brooke
- Cowboys from Texas (1939) - Stony Brooke
- Heroes of the Saddle (1940) - Stony Brooke
- Pioneers of the West (1940) - Stony Brooke
- Covered Wagon Days (1940) - Stony Brooke
- Rocky Mountain Rangers (1940) - Stony Brooke / Laredo Kid
- Oklahoma Renegades (1940) - Stony Brooke
- Under Texas Skies (1940) - Stony Brooke
- The Trail Blazers (1940) - Stony Brooke
- Lone Star Raiders (1940) - Stony Brooke
- Prairie Pioneers (1941) - Stony Brooke
- Pals of the Pecos (1941) - Stony Brooke
- Saddlemates (1941) - Stony Brooke
- Overland Stagecoach (1942) - Tom Cameron a.k.a. The Lone Rider
- Wild Horse Rustlers (1943) - Tom Cameron a.k.a. The Lone Rider
- Death Rides the Plains (1943) - Rocky Cameron alias The Lone Rider
- The Black Raven (1943) - Allen Bentley
- Wolves of the Range (1943) - Rocky Cameron alias The Lone Rider
- Law of the Saddle (1943) - Rocky Cameron a.k.a. The Lone Rider
- Raiders of Red Gap (1943) - Rocky (Lone Rider) Cameron
- Pistol Packin' Mama (1943) - Nick Winner
- Pride of the Plains (1944) - Johnny Revere
- Beneath Western Skies (1944) - Johnny Revere
- The Laramie Trail (1944) - Johnny Rapidan
- Goodnight, Sweetheart (1944) - Johnny Newsome
- Storm Over Lisbon (1944) - Bill Flanagan
- Brazil (1944) - Rod Walker
- Lake Placid Serenade (1944) - Paul Jordan
- The Big Bonanza (1944) - Sam Ballou
- Bells of Rosarita (1945) - Bob Livingston
- Steppin' in Society (1945) - Montana
- The Cheaters (1945) - Stephen Bates
- Tell It to a Star (1945) - Gene Ritchie
- Don't Fence Me In (1945) - Jack Chandler
- Dakota (1945) - Lieutenant
- The Undercover Woman (1946) - Sheriff Don Long
- Valley of the Zombies (1946) - Dr. Terrance 'Terry' Evans
- Daredevils of the Clouds (1948) - Terry O'Rourke
- Grand Canyon Trail (1948) - Bill Regan
- The Feathered Serpent (1948) - Prof. John Stanley
- The Mysterious Desperado (1949) - Honest John Jordan
- Riders in the Sky (1949) - Rock McCleary
- Mule Train (1950) - Sam Brady
- Law of the Badlands (1951) - Durkin
- Saddle Legion (1951) - Regan
- Night Stage to Galveston (1952) -Adjutant General Slayden
- Something for the Birds (1952) - General (uncredited)
- Winning of the West (1953) - Art Selby
- Once Upon a Horse... (1958) - Bob Livingston
- Girls for Rent (1974) - H.R.
- The Naughty Stewardesses (1974) - Ben Brewster
- Blazing Stewardesses (1975) - Ben Brewster
