= Johnny Lange =

- Born: John George Lange; August 15, 1905; Philadelphia, Pennsylvania, United States
- Died: January 6, 2006 (aged 100) Los Angeles, California, United States
- Occupation: Composer

John George Lange (August 15, 1905 – January 6, 2006) was an American songwriter, working mostly in the motion picture industry. His chief musical collaborators were Archie Gottler and Jack Meskill.

== Biography ==
Lange was born in Philadelphia and attended high school there. He began writing for film studios in 1937, and joined ASCAP in 1940. He resumed his film music career in 1946 and 1947, after World War II. He also wrote special material for night club singers, and the "Ice Capades of 1950".

Lange's most popular composition was "Mule Train" which earned him an Academy Award nomination in 1950 (it was featured in the film Singing Guns). The ASCAP online database shows him as the author of 211 songs. Among them are such well-known compositions as "Blue Shadows on the Trail" and "Clancy Lowered the Boom".

== Death ==
Johnny Lange died in Los Angeles in 2006, at the age of 100.
