= Lew Porter (composer) =

Lew Porter (February 4, 1892, New York City – January 29, 1956, Los Angeles) was an American composer and songwriter, contributing to the soundtracks of 72 films.

== Selected filmography ==
- Paroled from the Big House (1938)
- Gun Code (1940)
- Pioneer Days (1940)
