= Sky Racket =

Sky Racket may refer to:

- Sky Racket (film)
- Sky Racket (video game)
