= Fighting Marshal =

Fighting Marshal is an alternative title for the following western films:

- The Fighting Marshal, a 1931 film directed by D. Ross Lederman and starring Tim McCoy
- Cherokee Strip, a 1940 film directed by Lesley Selander and starring Richard Dix
