= Riders of Black Mountain =

1940 film

- DVD artwork
- Directed by: Sam Newfield
- Written by: Joseph O'Donnell
- Produced by: Sigmund Neufeld
- Starring: Tim McCoy; Pauline Haddon; Rex Lease
- Cinematography: Jack Greenhalgh
- Edited by: Holbrook N. Todd
- Music by: Lew Porter
- Distributed by: Producers Releasing Corporation (1940); Alpha Video (DVD)
- Release date: 1940
- Running time: 56 minutes
- Country: United States
- Language: English

Riders of Black Mountain is a 1940 Western film directed by Sam Newfield, under his pseudonym of Peter Stewart. It stars Tim McCoy, Pauline Haddon, and Rex Lease.

== Plot ==
A US Marshal is dispatched to solve a string of hold-ups. Disguising himself as a professional gambler, he believes he's found out who is feeding information to the outlaw gang committing the robberies. So he lets word get out that a valuable "shipment" is coming to town on the stage, knowing that if the stage is robbed, he will know who the "inside man" is. However, things don't go quite as planned.

== Release ==
Producers Releasing Corporation released the film originally in 1940. Alpha Video gave Riders of Black Mountain a DVD release in December 2009.
