= Straight Shooter =

Straight Shooter may refer to:

- Straight Shooter (Bad Company album), 1975
- Straight Shooter (James Gang album), 1972
- "Straight Shooter", a song by The Mamas & the Papas from the album If You Can Believe Your Eyes and Ears
- Straight Shooter (1939 film), an American film directed by Sam Newfield
- Straight Shooter (1999 film), a German film directed by Thomas Bohn
- Joe Bowman (marksman) (1925–2009), American marksman known as "The Straight Shooter"
