= Phantom Ranger =

Phantom Ranger may refer to:

- Phantom Ranger (Power Rangers), a character from Power Rangers Turbo
- Phantom Ranger (film), a 1938 American Western film
