= Outlaws of the Rio Grande =

1941 film directed by Sam Newfield

- Theatrical release poster
- Directed by: Sam Newfield
- Screenplay by: George H. Plympton
- Produced by: Sigmund Neufeld
- Starring: Tim McCoy; Virginia Carpenter; Charles King; Ralph Peters; Karl Hackett; Rex Lease
- Cinematography: Jack Greenhalgh
- Edited by: Holbrook N. Todd
- Production company: Producers Releasing Corporation
- Distributed by: Producers Releasing Corporation
- Release date: February 26, 1941
- Running time: 63 minutes
- Country: United States
- Language: English

Outlaws of the Rio Grande is a 1941 American Western film directed by Sam Newfield and written by George H. Plympton. The film stars Tim McCoy, Virginia Carpenter, Charles King, Ralph Peters, Karl Hackett and Rex Lease. The film was released on February 26, 1941, by Producers Releasing Corporation.

== Cast ==
- Tim McCoy as Tim Barton
- Virginia Carpenter as Rita Alvarado
- Charles King as Trigger
- Ralph Peters as Monty
- Karl Hackett as Marlow
- Rex Lease as Luke
- Felipe Turich as Pancho
- Frank Ellis as Brett
- Kenne Duncan as Bob Day
- Thornton Edwards as Alvarado
- Joe Dominguez as Castro
