= Dick Dickinson =

American actor

- Born: September 16, 1895
- Died: July 27, 1956 (aged 60)
- Occupations: Stunt performer, actor
- Years active: 1920–1954

Dick Dickinson (September 16, 1895 – July 27, 1956) was an American stunt performer and actor. He appeared in more than 90 films between 1920 and 1954. Approximately three months before his death, an article in The Pittsburgh Press dubbed Dickinson the "permanent stand-in" for actor Walter Brennan, a position he had occupied since the early 1930s. Interviewed after his death, Brennan also credited Dickinson with considerable expertise on the subjects of lighting and blocking, especially as regards not being upstaged by fellow performers.

== Selected filmography ==
- Molly O (1921), stunts
- The Phantom of the West (1931)
- The Galloping Ghost (1931)
- The Lightning Warrior (1931)
- The Fighting Marshal (1931)
- The Fighting Fool (1932)
- Hidden Valley (1932)
- Vanishing Men (1932)
- Texas Cyclone (1932)
- Law of the West (1932)
- High Speed (1932)
- Texas Buddies (1932)
- Galloping Romeo (1933)
- West of the Divide (1934)
- Big Calibre (1935)
- Prairie Justice (1938)
- Lightning Strikes West (1940)
- American Empire (1942)
- House of Frankenstein (1944)
- The Lost Trail (1945)
