= Roarin' Guns =

1936 film by Sam Newfield

- Lobby card
- Directed by: Sam Newfield
- Written by: Joseph O'Donnell (story and screenplay)
- Produced by: Sigmund Neufeld (producer); Leslie Simmonds (producer)
- Starring: See below
- Cinematography: Jack Greenhalgh
- Edited by: Holbrook N. Todd
- Music by: Oliver Wallace
- Distributed by: Puritan Pictures
- Release date: 1936
- Running time: 59 minutes
- Country: United States
- Language: English

Roarin' Guns is a 1936 American Western film directed by Sam Newfield.

== Plot summary ==
During a range war, the Cattleman's Association send Tim Corwin where he helps out his old friends Bob and Buddy Morgan as well as May Carter.

== Cast ==
- Tim McCoy as Tim Corwin
- Rosalinda Price as May Carter
- Wheeler Oakman as Walton
- Rex Lease as Jerry
- John Elliott as Bob Morgan
- Karl Hackett as Evans
- Richard Alexander as "Bull" Langdon
- Jack Rockwell as Dave Barry
- Ed Cassidy as Sheriff
- Tommy Bupp as Buddy Morgan
