= Code of the Rangers =

1938 film by Sam Newfield

- Theatrical release poster
- Directed by: Sam Newfield
- Screenplay by: Stanley Roberts
- Produced by: Maurice Conn
- Starring: Tim McCoy; Rex Lease; Judith Ford; Wheeler Oakman; Edward Earle; Frank LaRue
- Cinematography: Jack Greenhalgh
- Edited by: Richard G. Wray
- Production company: Conn Pictures Corporation
- Distributed by: Monogram Pictures
- Release date: April 8, 1938
- Running time: 56 minutes
- Country: United States
- Language: English

Code of the Rangers is a 1938 American Western film directed by Sam Newfield and written by Stanley Roberts. The film stars Tim McCoy, Rex Lease, Judith Ford, Wheeler Oakman, Edward Earle and Frank LaRue. The film was released on April 8, 1938, by Monogram Pictures.

== Plot ==
Ranger Tim Strong resigns after finding out that his brother is a gang member and broke a member of a gang from jail; later the gang robs the town bank and Tim goes after them, he finds his brother with the loot, but takes the blame for his brother. After being released he and his reformed brother go after the gang leader Blackie Miller.

== Cast ==
- Tim McCoy as Tim Strong
- Rex Lease as Jack Strong
- Judith Ford as Anne Sage
- Wheeler Oakman as Blackie Miller
- Edward Earle as Price
- Frank LaRue aa Dave Sage
- Edward Peil Sr. as Ranger Captain
- Kit Guard as Red
- Roger Williams as Lawson
- Jack Ingram as Hank
- Hal Price as Charlie Stevens
- Budd Buster as Mine Agent
- Zeke Clemens as Yodeler
