= Lightning Carson Rides Again =

1938 film

- Directed by: Sam Newfield
- Written by: Isadore Bernstein
- Produced by: Sam Katzman
- Starring: Tim McCoy; Joan Barclay; Ted Adams
- Cinematography: Marcel Le Picard
- Edited by: Holbrook N. Todd
- Production company: Victory Pictures
- Distributed by: Victory Pictures
- Release date: October 10, 1938
- Running time: 58 minutes
- Country: United States
- Language: English

Lightning Carson Rides Again is a 1938 American Western film directed by Sam Newfield and starring Tim McCoy, Joan Barclay and Ted Adams.

== Cast ==
- Tim McCoy as "Lightning Bill" Carson / Jose
- Joan Barclay as Sally, Paul Smith's Sweetheart
- Ted Adams as Gang leader Chuck
- Bob Terry as Paul Smith, Carson's Nephew
- Forrest Taylor as Gunfight Henchman
- Ben Corbett as Henchman Shorty
- Slim Whitaker as Hogan, Saloon Owner
- Frank Wayne as Bank Cashier
- Jane Keckley as Katherine Smith, Carson's Sister
- Karl Hackett as Gray (Banker)
- Reed Howes as Henchman Jimmy
- Frank LaRue as Sheriff Armstrong
- James Flavin as Justice Department Agent
