= The Accusing Finger =

1936 film by James P. Hogan

- Theatrical release poster
- Directed by: James P. Hogan
- Screenplay by: Madeleine Ruthven; Brian Marlow; John Bright; Robert Tasker
- Produced by: A.M. Botsford
- Starring: Paul Kelly; Marsha Hunt; Kent Taylor; Robert Cummings; Harry Carey; Bernadene Hayes; Joe Sawyer
- Cinematography: Henry Sharp
- Edited by: Chandler House
- Production company: Paramount Pictures
- Distributed by: Paramount Pictures
- Release date: October 23, 1936
- Running time: 61 minutes
- Country: United States
- Language: English

The Accusing Finger is a 1936 American drama film directed by James P. Hogan and written by Madeleine Ruthven, Brian Marlow, John Bright and Robert Tasker. The film stars Paul Kelly, Marsha Hunt, Kent Taylor, Robert Cummings, Harry Carey, Bernadene Hayes and Joe Sawyer. The film was released on October 23, 1936, by Paramount Pictures.

== Plot ==
An attorney is proud of sending many people to jail, some of whom were innocent. His wife is killed, and due to circumstantial evidence, he is sent to jail and finds himself with many of the people he prosecuted.

== Cast ==
- Paul Kelly as Douglas Goodwin
- Marsha Hunt as Claire Patterson
- Kent Taylor as Jerry Welch
- Robert Cummings as Jimmy Ellis
- Harry Carey as Sen. Nash
- Bernadene Hayes as Muriel Goodwin
- Joe Sawyer as Father Reed
- DeWitt Jennings as Prison Warden
- Russell Hicks as Sen. Forrest
- Jonathan Hale as Special Prosecutor
- Ellen Drew as Wife
- Rollo Lloyd as Dr. Simms
- Paul Fix as John 'Twitchy' Burke
- Sam Flint as Dist. Atty. Benton
- Ralf Harolde as 'Spud'
- Fred Kohler as Johnson
- Hilda Vaughn as Maid
- George Chandler as Reporter
