= War Paint (1926 film) =

1926 film

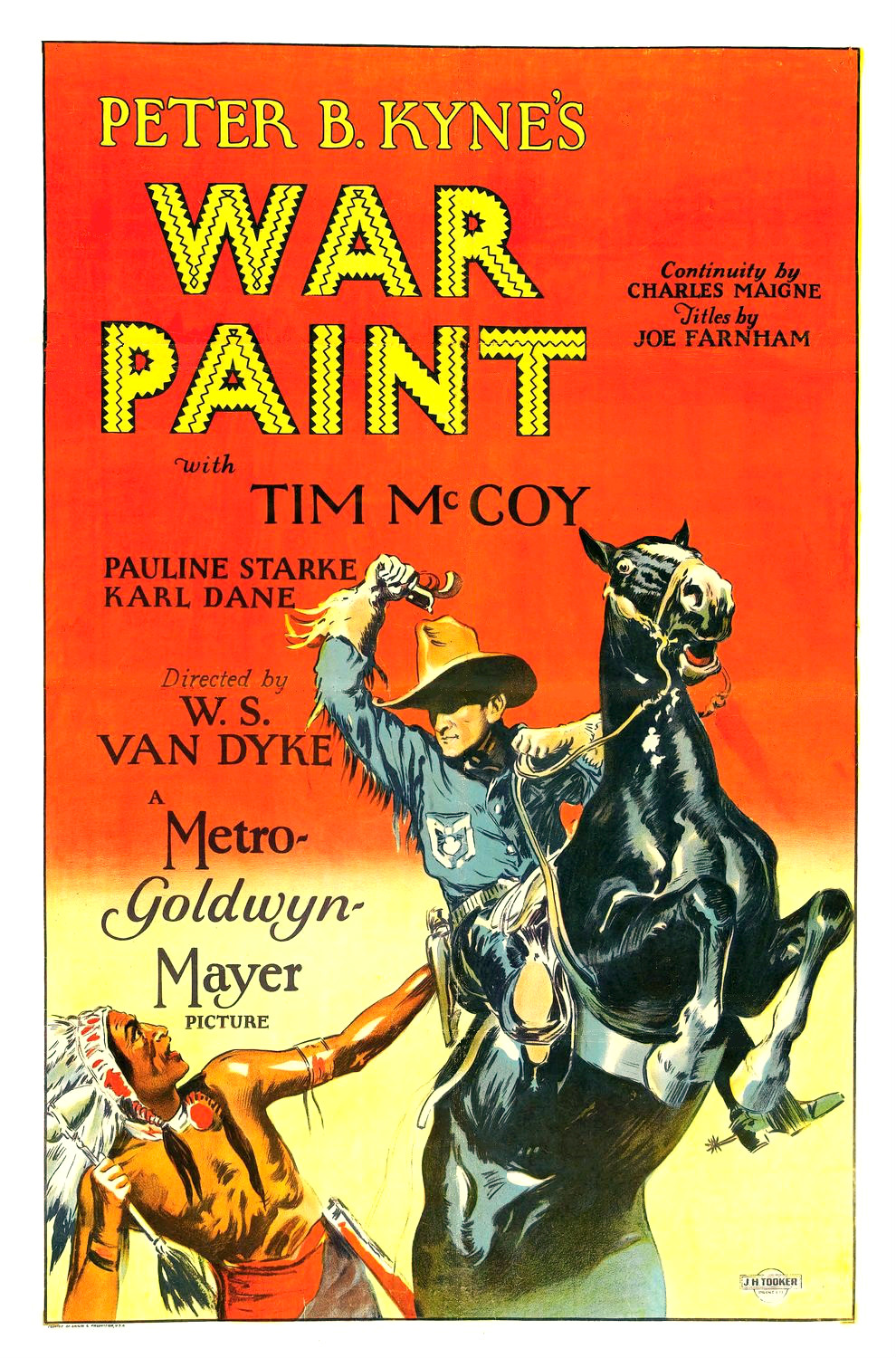
- Directed by: W. S. Van Dyke
- Written by: Charles Maigne
- Based on: War Paint by Peter B. Kyne
- Starring: Tim McCoy; Pauline Starke
- Cinematography: Clyde De Vinna
- Distributed by: Metro-Goldwyn-Mayer
- Release date: October 10, 1926
- Country: United States
- Languages: Silent; English intertitles

War Paint is a 1926 American silent Western film directed by W. S. Van Dyke. The film stars Tim McCoy. Louis B. Mayer observed the profits made by other studios with western franchises such as Tom Mix, Buck Jones or Hoot Gibson. He selected a genuine army officer who had lived with Indian tribes to come to Hollywood as an advisor on 1922's The Covered Wagon: Colonel Timothy John Fitzgerald McCoy. His debut as Tim McCoy in War Paint was announced under the banner "He's the real McCoy!" In order to maximize the economics, the film was shot simultaneously on location with another film, Winners of the Wilderness. The film is considered lost. A trailer however is preserved at the Library of Congress.

== Synopsis ==
An Indian chief of the Arapahoe escapes the reservation where he has been living and takes along some of his warriors. The cavalry is sent out for them.

== Cast ==
- Tim McCoy as Lt. Tim Marshall
- Pauline Starke as Polly Hopkins
- Charles K. French as Maj. Hopkins (as Charles French)
- Chief Yowlachie as Iron Eyes
- Whitehorse as White Hawk (as Chief Whitehorse)
- Karl Dane as Petersen
