= Aces and Eights (film) =

- Film poster
- Directed by: Sam Newfield
- Written by: George Arthur Durlam (story); Joseph O'Donnell (screenplay)
- Produced by: Sigmund Neufeld; Leslie Simmonds
- Starring: See below
- Narrated by: Karl Hackett as Wild Bill Hickok
- Cinematography: Jack Greenhalgh (photography); James Diamond
- Edited by: John English; Robert Jahns
- Production company: Puritan Pictures
- Release date: June 6, 1936
- Running time: 62 minutes
- Country: United States
- Language: English

Aces and Eights is a western film from 1936, directed and produced by Sam Newfield, written by George Arthur Durlam and screenplayed by Joseph O'Donnell. The film stars the famous western actor Tim McCoy as the gentleman, lone wolf, protagonist, Tim Madigan who's accused of murder. The innocent Tim Madigan hopes to prove his innocence while seeking to save the Hernandez Ranch. The supporting cast includes Luana Walters as Juanita Hernandez, Rex Lease as Jose Hernandez, Wheeler Oakman as Ace Morgan, J. Frank Glendon as Amos Harden, Charles Stevens as Captain de Lopez, Earle Hodgins as Marshal, Jimmy Aubrey as Sidekick Lucky, Joseph W. Girard as Don Julio Hernandez, Karl Hackett as Wild Bill Hickok.

With the support of their production company, Puritan Pictures, Aces and Eights was released in America, on June 6, 1936, with a total run time of 62 minutes. The movie is commended for being true to the genre of the west and for creating an intriguing story with various elements of suspense, murder, excitement, heroism and more.

== Plot ==
"Aces and Eights" is a Western centered around Tim Madigan, a refined gambler known for his aversion to firearms. The story unfolds as Tim exposes Jose Hernandez as a cheat at cards, leading to Jose being shot after an altercation where Tim renders him unconscious. Despite his non-violent reputation, Marshal Tom Barstow suspects Tim of Jose's murder. Tim seeks refuge at the ranch of Don Hernandez and his daughter Juanita.

Meanwhile, saloon owner Amos Harden and gambler Ace Morgan, who were present during the fatal card game, conspire to seize the Hernandez ranch by fraudulent means. As Tim faces constant harassment and suspicion from the Marshal, he focuses on saving the Hernandez ranch. His strategy involves outwitting Harden and Morgan in high-stakes gambling.

As Tim's gambling prowess raises the stakes, he gains access to the saloon, where he uncovers evidence that shifts suspicion away from himself. The evidence reveals that Jose was actually killed by Jack McCall, bringing the true culprit to justice and clearing Tim's name.

== Production ==
=== Casting ===
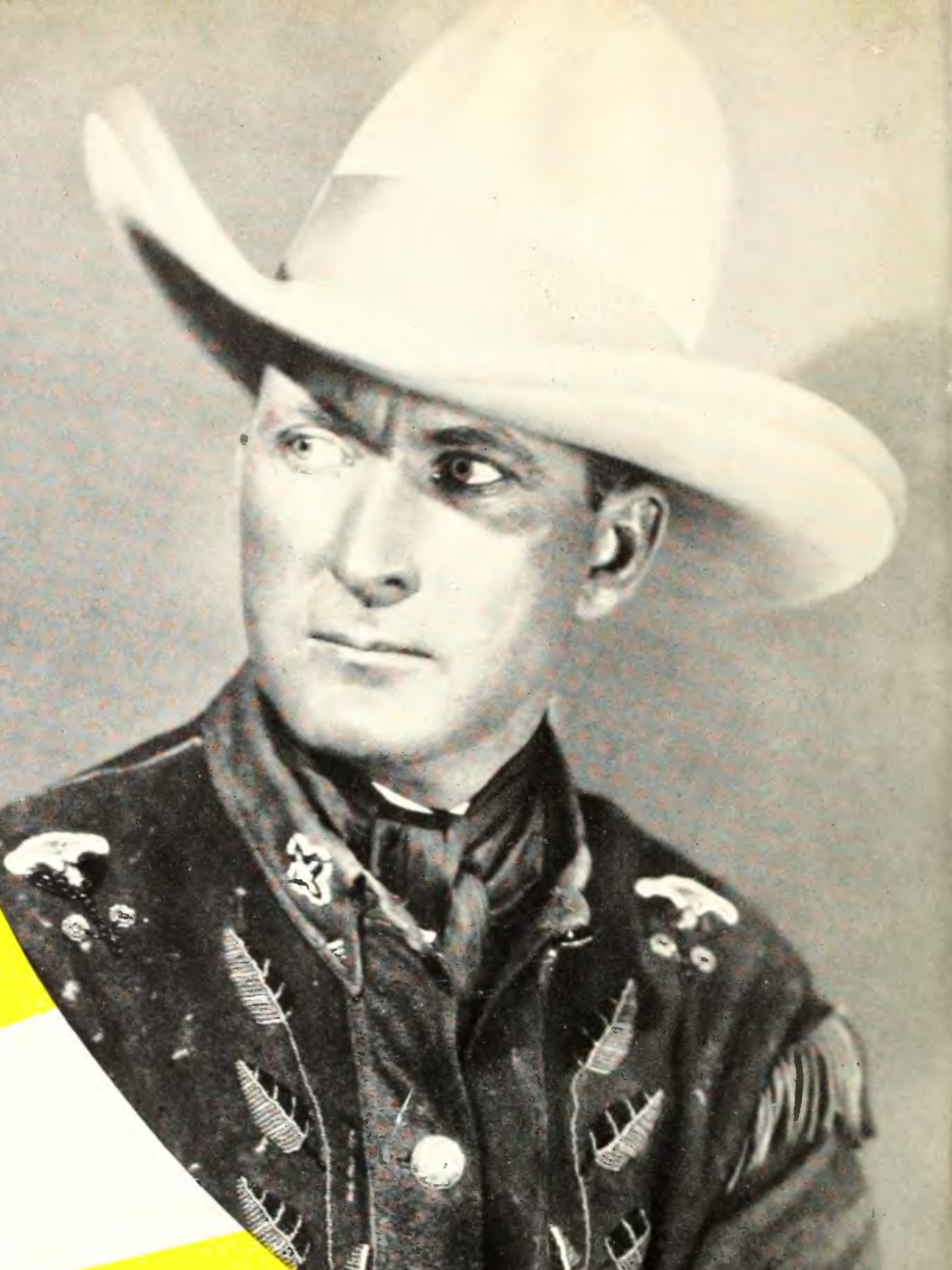
Tim McCoy played the lead character of Tim Madigan.

In the mid-20th century, Tim McCoy was a notable actor in Hollywood, particularly in Western films. When casting for a gambling-themed Western movie, McCoy was chosen for the lead role due to his established presence in the genre and ability to attract audiences.

To complement McCoy's character, Luana Walters was selected as the co-star. With a diverse portfolio of films, Walters was known for her performances in sci-fi, horror, and Western genres. Her horseback riding experience also made her a suitable choice for the role alongside McCoy in "Aces and Eights."

=== Editing and Film Techniques ===
"Aces and Eights" is characterized by its deliberate pacing, immersing the audience into the world of the film from the outset. This approach aids the narrative by clearly establishing each character's unique traits and motivations. The gradual unfolding of events also sets the stage for the central conflict: Tim Madigan's wrongful accusation of Jose Hernandez's murder.

The film employs the technique of Cutting on Action effectively, particularly in scenes involving horseback riding or combat. By cutting to reactions of other characters mid-action, the film emphasizes the significance of these reactions, often making them more impactful than the actions themselves.

Continuity editing plays a crucial role in maintaining coherence and rhythm, especially during dialogue and suspenseful sequences. Director Sam Newfield seamlessly blends clips together, creating smooth transitions that are barely perceptible to the audience. This editing technique enhances the overall viewing experience, ensuring a cohesive and engaging narrative flow.

== Cast ==
- Tim McCoy as 'Gentleman' Tim Madigan
- Luana Walters as Juanita Hernandez
- Rex Lease as Jose Hernandez
- Wheeler Oakman as Ace Morgan
- J. Frank Glendon as Amos Harden
- Charles Stevens as Captain de Lopez
- Earle Hodgins as Marshal
- Jimmy Aubrey as Sidekick Lucky
- Joseph W. Girard as Don Julio Hernandez
- Karl Hackett as Wild Bill Hickok
