= Felipe Turich =

Mexican actor (1898–1992)

- Born: December 5, 1898; Hidalgo, Mexico
- Died: March 9, 1992 (aged 93); Los Angeles, California, U.S.
- Occupation: Actor
- Years active: 1935–1983
- Spouse: Rosa Turich
- Children: 3

Felipe Turich (December 5, 1898 – March 9, 1992) was a Mexican film and television actor. He appeared in numerous films and TV series from the 1930s to the 1980s.

== Biography ==
Turich was born in Hidalgo, Mexico, in 1898. He started his acting career in the 1920s, making his first appearance as an actor in the film, Mademoiselle Midnight in 1924. During the 1950s and 1960s, he acted in films like The Capture, Branded, Three Hours to Kill, Giant, The Magnificent Seven and Jesse James Meets Frankenstein's Daughter.

He also appeared in several TV series like Stories of the Century, The Star and the Story, Cavalcade of America, The Restless Gun, and Playhouse 90.

Turich also worked as a comedian in Los Angeles theaters during the 1920s.

== Personal life ==
Turich was married to Rosa Turich and had three children with her.

== Death ==
Turich died on March 9, 1992, in Los Angeles of pneumonia, aged 93. He was buried at San Fernando Mission Cemetery and was survived by his wife and three children.

== Selected filmography ==
=== Film ===
- Kid Courageous (1935) - Cantina Announcer (uncredited)
- The Kid Ranger (1936) - Cantina Owner (uncredited)
- Danger Patrol (1937) - Mexican officer (uncredited)
- La Inmaculada (1939)
- Outlaws of the Rio Grande (1941) - Pancho
- The Lone Rider Crosses the Rio (1941) - Lieutenant Mendoza
- Masquerade in Mexico (1945) - Desk Clerk (uncredited)
- South of Monterey (1946) - Land Owner (uncredited)
- Don Ricardo Returns (1946) - Peon (uncredited)
- Beauty and the Bandit (1946) - Sick Farmer
- Bells of San Fernando (1947) - Pablo, the traitor
- Honeymoon (1947) - Waiter (uncredited)
- Robin Hood of Monterey (1947) - Jose - Sentry / Servant (uncredited)
- To the Victor (1948) - Victor (uncredited)
- Mexican Hayride (1948) - Taxco Silver Dealer (uncredited)
- The Bribe (1949) - First Hotel Clerk (uncredited)
- Son of Billy the Kid (1949) - José Gonzáles
- We Were Strangers (1949) - Spy (uncredited)
- The Big Steal (1949) - Guitar Vendor (uncredited)
- Dakota Lil (1950) - Mexican escort (uncredited)
- The Capture (1950) - Valdez
- The Lawless (1950) - Mr. Rodriguez
- Bright Leaf (1950) - Accountant at Tobacco auction (uncredited)
- Crisis (1950) - Man with Valise / Voice on Loudspeaker (uncredited)
- A Lady Without Passport (1950) - Slinky Man (uncredited)
- Wyoming Mail (1950) - Pete
- Branded (1950) - (uncredited)
- The Bandit Queen (1950) - Ortiz (uncredited)
- Short Grass (1950) - Manuel
- Sirocco (1951) - Soldier (uncredited)
- The Mark of the Renegade (1951) - Servant (uncredited)
- Havana Rose (1951) - General Cucarotsky (uncredited)
- My Favorite Spy (1951) - Porter (uncredited)
- The Fighter (1952) - Pedro Dimas (uncredited)
- Rancho Notorious (1952) - Sanchez (uncredited)
- The Hitch-Hiker (1953) - Bit Part (uncredited)
- Jeopardy (1953) - Mexican Border Official (uncredited)
- Wings of the Hawk (1953) - Guard (uncredited)
- Tumbleweed (1953) - Mexican (uncredited)
- Border River (1954) - Pablo
- Jubilee Trail (1954) - Pedro (uncredited)
- Dawn at Socorro (1954) - Casino Waiter (uncredited)
- Three Hours to Kill (1954) - Esteban
- Strange Lady in Town (1955) - Esteban (uncredited)
- The Broken Star (1956) - Carlos Alvarado (uncredited)
- Back from Eternity (1956) - Shrunken Head Peddler
- Giant (1956) - Gómez (uncredited)
- The Iron Sheriff (1957) - Courtroom Spectator (uncredited)
- The Persuader (1957) - Pete
- Tip on a Dead Jockey (1957) - Doctor (uncredited)
- Teenage Doll (1957) - Squirrel's Father (uncredited)
- Gun Battle at Monterey (1957) - Martinez (uncredited)
- Holiday for Lovers (1959) - Cafe Patron (uncredited)
- The Miracle (1959) - Proprietor (uncredited)
- One-Eyed Jacks (1961) - Cardsharp (uncredited)
- The Second Time Around (1961) - The Cantina Bartender (uncredited)
- The Chase (1966) - Worker (uncredited)
- Jesse James Meets Frankenstein's Daughter (1966) - Manuel López
- Firecreek (1968) - Carlos (uncredited)
- I Love You, Alice B. Toklas (1968) - Rodríguez Family Member (uncredited)
- Hook, Line & Sinker (1969) - Foreign Mortician
- Fuzz (1972) - Puerto Rican Prisoner
- The All-American Boy (1973) - Elderly Trainer (uncredited)
- Walk Proud (1979) - Prayer Maker

=== Television ===
- Rebound (1952) - Sebastian
- Boston Blackie (1953)
- Stories of the Century (1955) - Méndez
- The Star and the Story (1955) - Gypsy
- Cavalcade of America (1956)
- Broken Arrow (1956)
- Cheyenne (1957) - Ortiz
- The Lineup (1957) - Gonzales
- Death Valley Days (1957) - Leiva
- 26 Men (1958) - Greco
- The Restless Gun (1958) - Tío Paco
- Playhouse 90 (1957–1959)
- Black Saddle (1959) - El Mudo
- General Electric Theater (1959)
- Wagon Train (1959) - Mr. Canellis
- Peter Gunn (1959) - Inspector Guevera
- Tales of Wells Fargo (1957–1959) - Barkeep
- The Man and the Challenge (1960) - Grantina
- Checkmate (1960) - Policeman
- Bonanza (1961) - Jail Guard
- Target: The Corruptors! (1962)
- Temple Houston (1965)
- Convoy (1965) - Waiter
- Rawhide (1965) - Barber
- I Spy (1966) - Jorge
- The Immortal (1970) - Juan
- The High Chaparral (1970) - Stableman
- Search (1972) - Krishna Singh
- Adam-12 (1973) - Antonio
- Kung Fu (1973) - Tadeo
- The Cowboys (1974) - Adolfo
- Cannon (1975) - Dr. Xomiti
- Police Story (1975) - Mr. Segura
- The Quest (1976) - Peasant
- Barney Miller (1978) - Jorge Rodríguez
- How the West Was Won (1978) - Manuel's Grandfather
- Lou Grant (1977–1979) - Old Man / Grandfather
- Matt Houston (1983) - Santos
