= Whirlwind Horseman =

- Theatrical release poster
- Directed by: Robert F. Hill
- Screenplay by: George H. Plympton
- Produced by: Max Alexander; Arthur Alexander
- Starring: Ken Maynard; Joan Barclay; Billy Griffith; Kenneth Harlan; Joseph W. Girard; Kenny Dix
- Cinematography: William Hyer
- Edited by: Charles Henkel Jr.
- Production companies: M & A Alexander Productions
- Distributed by: Grand National Films
- Release date: April 29, 1938
- Running time: 58 minutes
- Country: United States
- Language: English

Whirlwind Horseman is a 1938 American Western film directed by Robert F. Hill and written by George H. Plympton. The film stars Ken Maynard, Joan Barclay, Billy Griffith, Kenneth Harlan, Joseph W. Girard and Kenny Dix. The film was released on April 29, 1938, by Grand National Films Inc.

== Cast ==
- Ken Maynard as Ken Morton
- Joan Barclay as Peggy Radford
- Billy Griffith as Happy Holmes
- Kenneth Harlan as John Harper
- Joseph W. Girard as Jim Radford
- Kenny Dix as Lonesome
- Glenn Strange as Bull
- Roger Williams as Ritter
- Dave O'Brien as Slade
- Walter Shumway as Sheriff Blake
- Budd Buster as Cherokee Jake
- Lew Meehan as Hank
- Tarzan as Tarzan
