= The Law of the Range =

1928 film

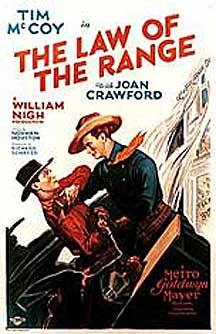
- Theatrical poster
- Directed by: William Nigh
- Written by: Story: Norman Houston; Screenplay: Richard Schayer; Titles: Robert E. Hopkins
- Starring: Tim McCoy; Joan Crawford; Rex Lease; Bodil Rosing
- Cinematography: Clyde De Vinna
- Edited by: Dan Sharits
- Distributed by: Metro-Goldwyn-Mayer
- Release date: January 21, 1928
- Running time: 60 minutes
- Country: United States
- Languages: Silent; English intertitles

The Law of the Range is a 1928 American silent Western film starring Tim McCoy and Joan Crawford and Rex Lease.

== Plot ==
Betty Dallas is a passenger on a stagecoach that is held up by an outlaw named The Solitaire Kid. Ranger Jim Lockhart, who is Betty's sweetheart, is in pursuit of The Solitaire Kid, and in the end, as the two men face one another, there is a mortal shoot-out.

== Cast ==
- Tim McCoy as Jim Lockhart
- Joan Crawford as Betty Dallas
- Rex Lease as Solitaire Kid
- Bodil Rosing as Mother of Jim and the Kid
- Tenen Holtz as Cohen

== Preservation ==
A complete copy of the film survives; preserved by MGM preservation laboratory.
