= Texas Cyclone (film) =

1932 film

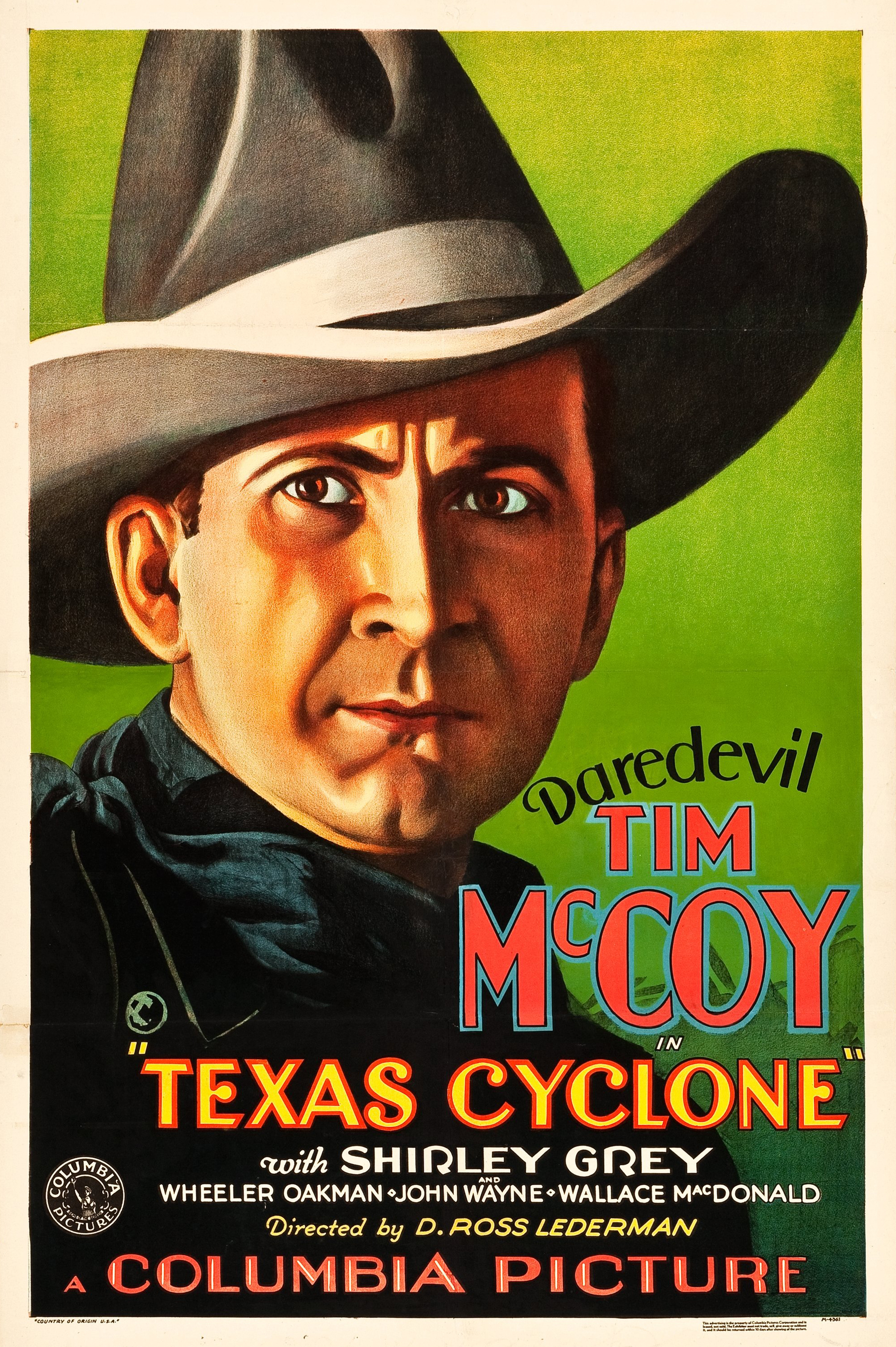
- Original poster
- Directed by: D. Ross Lederman
- Screenplay by: Randall Faye
- Story by: William Colt MacDonald
- Produced by: Irving Briskin
- Starring: Tim McCoy; Shirley Grey; Wheeler Oakman; John Wayne; Wallace MacDonald
- Cinematography: Benjamin H. Kline
- Edited by: Otto Meyer
- Production company: Columbia Pictures
- Distributed by: Columbia Pictures
- Release date: February 24, 1932
- Running time: 63 minutes 57 minutes (1953 TV release)
- Country: United States
- Language: English

Texas Cyclone is a 1932 American pre-Code Western film directed by D. Ross Lederman for Columbia Pictures. The film stars Tim McCoy as "Texas Grant", Shirley Grey, Wheeler Oakman and John Wayne, and features an early appearance by Walter Brennan as the sheriff.

== Plot ==
"Texas" Grant rides into a strange town only to find that everyone there recognizes him, but not as Texas Grant. The town villains confuse him with a lawman named Jim Rawlings whom they had murdered a few years prior, because the two men look very similar. Hefty the bartender and Sheriff Collins used to be friends with Rawlings and come up with a plan to fool the local crooks into thinking Grant really is the man they killed. Even Helen, the dead lawman's widow, thinks her husband has returned from the grave when she first sees him.

Grant sees how the woman's ranch hands are mismanaging the ranch her husband left her and are even stealing from her, and decides to help her get the place back to financial solvency. Appointing himself the new boss and adopting the identity of Jim Rawlings, he fires all but one of the ranch hands, an honest young man named Steve Pickett, and together Grant and Pickett try to help the widow rebuild her enterprise.

== Cast ==
- Tim McCoy as "Texas" Grant
- Shirley Grey as Helen Rawlings
- Wheeler Oakman as Utah Becker
- John Wayne as Steve Pickett
- Wallace MacDonald as Nick Lawler, Ranch Foreman
- James Farley as Webb Oliver
- Walter Brennan as Sheriff Lew Collins
- Dick Dickinson as Knife Thrower (uncredited)

== See also ==
- List of American films of 1932
