= Outlaws' Paradise =

1939 film by Sam Newfield

- Directed by: Sam Newfield
- Written by: Basil Dickey
- Produced by: Sam Katzman
- Starring: See below
- Cinematography: Marcel Le Picard
- Edited by: Holbrook N. Todd
- Production company: Victory Pictures Corporation
- Release date: April 19, 1939
- Running time: 62 minutes
- Country: United States
- Language: English

Outlaws' Paradise is a 1939 American Western film directed by Sam Newfield and was produced by Victory Pictures Corporations

== Plot ==
Gang leader Trigger Mallory is about to be released from prison. When Bill Carson notices the resemblance, he gets the Warden to hold Mallory and he assumes his identity. He fools both the gang and Trigger's girlfriend Jessie as he sets them up to be captured. But Trigger escapes from prison and returns to expose the hoax and Bill is made a prisoner.

== Cast ==
- Tim McCoy as Captain William "Lightning Bill" Carson / Trigger Mallory
- Joan Barclay as Jessie Treadwell
- Ben Corbett as Magpie Magillicuddy
- Ted Adams as Slim Marsh
- Forrest Taylor as Henchman Eddie
- Bob Terry as Henchman Steve
- Donald Gallaher as Henchman Mort
- Dave O'Brien as Henchman Meggs
- Jack Mulhall as Prison Warden

== Broadcast ==
The film's earliest documented telecasts took place in Philadelphia Thursday 11 August 1949 on Frontier Playhouse on WPTZ (Channel 3), in Cincinnati Saturday 16 October 1949 on WLW-T (Channel 4), and in Los Angeles Saturday 28 October 1949 on KFI (Channel 9).

== Reception ==
Martin Hafer suggests "Despite McCoy's fun performance, clichés and poor writing keep this one from being among his best."

== Follow-up film ==
Six Gun Theater: Outlaw's Paradise was released on June 3, 2015, based on the original Outlaw's Paradise
