= Six-Gun Trail =

1938 American Western film

- Lobby card
- Directed by: Sam Newfield
- Written by: Isadore Bernstein (original story and screenplay)
- Produced by: Sam Katzman
- Starring: See below
- Cinematography: Marcel Le Picard
- Edited by: Holbrook N. Todd
- Distributed by: Victory Pictures
- Release date: November 25, 1938
- Running time: 59 minutes
- Country: United States
- Language: English

Six-Gun Trail is a 1938 American Western film directed by Sam Newfield.

== Plot ==
Chasing jewel thieves, Captain Carson and Magpie head for the border, where Carson, posing as a Chinaman, opens a store that buys jewelry. To flush the thieves into the open, Carson wins all their money at poker. They agree to sell him the jewels, but plan to kill him and keep both the jewels and the money.

== Cast ==
- Tim McCoy as Capt. William 'Lightning Bill' Carson
- Nora Lane as Midge
- Ben Corbett as Magpie
- Alden Stephen Chase as Jim Wilson
- Ted Adams as Spokesman
- Donald Gallaher as Henchman Tracy (Mac in credits)
- Bob Terry as Henchman Mac (Tracy in credits)
- Karl Hackett as Joe Willis
- Frank Wayne as Messenger
- Hal Carey as Singer

== Soundtrack ==
- Hal Carey - "A Cowboy Sings a Lullaby" (Written by Johnny Lange and Lew Porter)
- Hal Carey - "Moon Over the Plains" (Written by Johnny Lange and Lew Porter)
