= Galloping Romeo =

1933 film

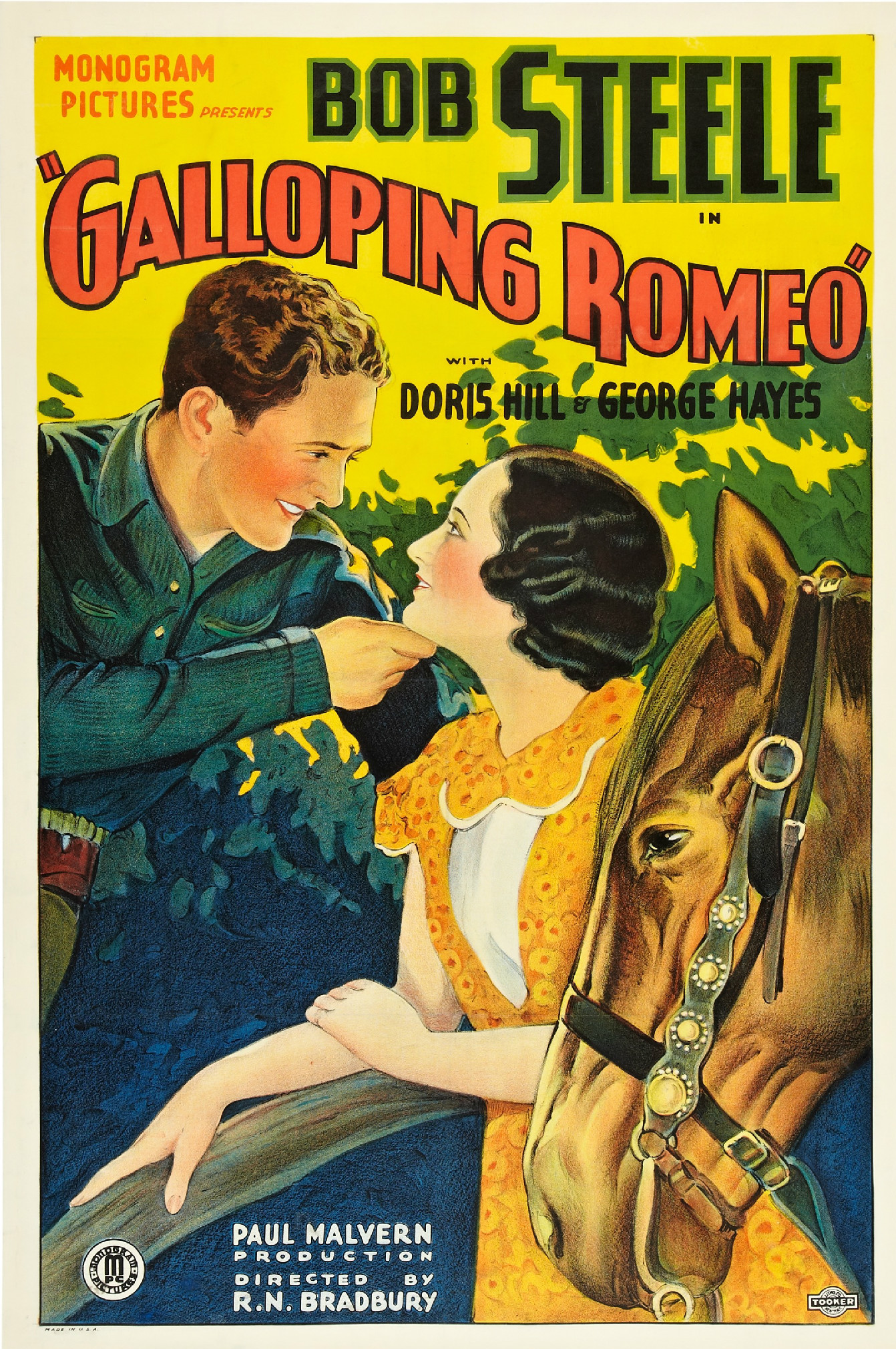
- Theatrical release poster
- Directed by: Robert N. Bradbury
- Written by: Robert N. Bradbury (story) (uncredited); Harry L. Fraser (adaptation)
- Produced by: Paul Malvern (producer); Trem Carr (supervising producer) (uncredited)
- Starring: See below
- Cinematography: Archie Stout
- Edited by: Carl Pierson
- Distributed by: Monogram Pictures
- Release date: August 5, 1933
- Running time: 60 minutes
- Country: United States
- Language: English

Galloping Romeo is a 1933 American pre-Code Western film released by Monogram Pictures, written and directed by Robert N. Bradbury, and starring Bob Steele.

== Cast ==
- Bob Steele as Bob Rivers
- Doris Hill as Mary Kent
- George "Gabby" Hayes as Grizzly
- Ed Brady as Matt Kent
- Frank Ball as Sheriff Jerry
- Ernie Adams as Andy Kent
- Lafe McKee as Marshal Gregory
- Earl Dwire as Express Agent Pete Manning (replaced by Hal Price)
- George Nash as Henchman
- Silver Tip Baker as Stage Driver Silver Keller (uncredited)
- Dick Dickinson as Henchman (uncredited)
- Tex Palmer as Deputy (uncredited)
- Hal Price as Pete Manning, Express Agent (uncredited)

== See also ==
- Bob Steele filmography
