= Amateur Crook =

1937 film by Sam Katzman

- Joan Barclay and Bruce Bennett (Herman Brix) in Amateur Crook (1937)
- Directed by: Sam Katzman
- Written by: Basil Dickey (story and screenplay)
- Produced by: Sam Katzman (producer)
- Starring: See below
- Cinematography: William Hyer
- Edited by: Holbrook N. Todd
- Production company: Victory Pictures
- Distributed by: Victory Pictures
- Release date: December 10, 1937
- Running time: 60 minutes
- Country: United States
- Language: English

Amateur Crook is a 1937 American romantic comedy film directed by Sam Katzman.

The film is also known as Crooked But Dumb (in the United Kingdom) and Jewel Thief (American TV title).

== Plot ==
Betsy Cummings takes a job as a secretary, using the alias “Mary Layton”, only to find that her Father is being cheated by his brokers, Crone and Jan Jaffin.

She steals the diamond, worth fifty thousand dollars, her Father used as collateral for a loan, which the brokers plan to cheat him out of; and, the chase is on, with the crooked loan sharks and police after her.

Jimmy Baxter, an honest but broke artist, hides her as a mannequin, and helps her get away, in a stolen car.

They just have to keep ahead of everyone after them, until her Father can get back, if he can get back, with the brokers’ crooked henchmen trying to stop him.

Out of luck and almost out of time, they all end up in front of a Justice of the Peace, who tries to fathom out the facts, and whether to jail the pair or marry them, before his dinner gets cold.

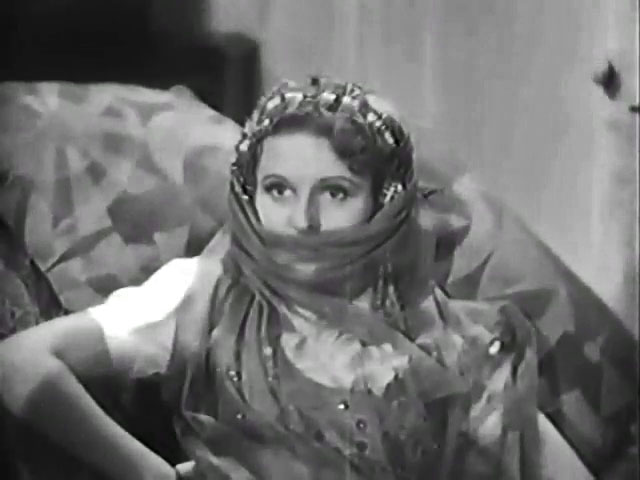
Joan Barclay disguised as a mannequin, in Amateur Crook (1937)

== Cast ==
- Bruce Bennett as Jimmy Baxter
- Joan Barclay as Betsy Cummings, alias Mary Layton
- Monte Blue as Crone
- Jack Mulhall as Jan Jaffin
- Vivien Oakland as Mrs. Flint, Landlady
- Jimmy Aubrey as Ben Armand, Junk Dealer
- Fuzzy Knight as Jape, the Gas-Station Attendant
- Henry Roquemore as Judge Ephraim
- Edward Earle as Deputy Jonas
- Forrest Taylor as Jerry Cummings
- Fern Emmett as Sarah, Ephraim's Wife
- Sam Adams as Policeman
- Charles Williams as Drunk Witness
