= Spoilers of the West =

1927 film

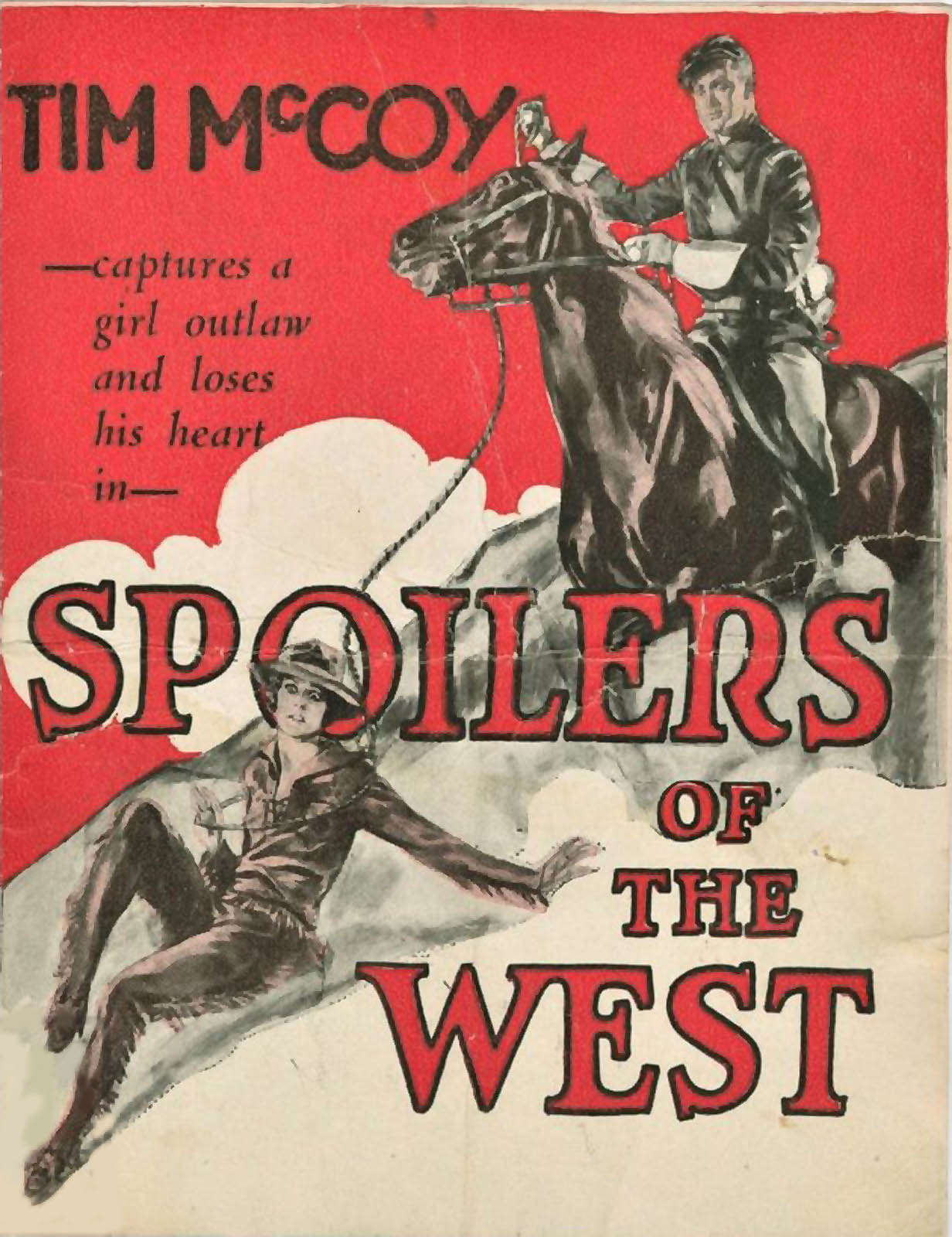
- Directed by: W. S. Van Dyke
- Screenplay by: Joseph Farnham; Madeleine Ruthven; Ross B. Wills
- Story by: John T. Neville
- Starring: Tim McCoy; Marjorie Daw; William Fairbanks; Charles Thurston; Chief John Big Tree
- Cinematography: Clyde De Vinna
- Edited by: Dan Sharits
- Production company: Metro-Goldwyn-Mayer
- Distributed by: Loew's Inc.
- Release date: December 10, 1927
- Running time: 52 minutes
- Country: United States
- Languages: Silent; English intertitles

Spoilers of the West is a 1927 American silent Western film directed by W. S. Van Dyke, written by Joseph Farnham, Madeleine Ruthven, and Ross B. Wills, and starring Tim McCoy, Marjorie Daw, William Fairbanks, Charles Thurston and Chief John Big Tree. It was released on December 10, 1927, by Metro-Goldwyn-Mayer.

== Cast ==
- Tim McCoy as Lieutenant Lang
- Marjorie Daw as Miss Benton
- William Fairbanks as Benton
- Charles Thurston as General Sherman
- Chief John Big Tree as Red Cloud
