= High Speed (1932 film) =

1932 film

- Directed by: D. Ross Lederman
- Written by: Harold Shumate (story); Adele Buffington (adaptation and dialogue)
- Starring: Buck Jones
- Cinematography: Ted Tetzlaff
- Edited by: Harry Marker
- Distributed by: Columbia Pictures
- Release date: April 2, 1932
- Running time: 62 minutes
- Country: United States
- Language: English

High Speed is a 1932 American Pre-Code crime film directed by D. Ross Lederman.

== Cast ==
- Buck Jones as Bill Toomey (billed as Charles 'Buck' Jones)
- Loretta Sayers as Peggy Preston
- Wallace MacDonald as Tom Corliss
- Pat O'Malley as Paul Whipple
- Edward LeSaint as Police Captain Blaine (billed as Ed Le Saint)
- Will Walling as Mr. Preston (billed as William Walling)
- Ward Bond as Ham
- Dick Dickinson as Walter F. Kane
- Martin Faust as Kelly
- Joe Bordeaux as Tony Orlando (uncredited)
- Mickey Rooney as Buddy Whipple (uncredited)
- Eddy Chandler as Steve Macey (uncredited)
