= The Fighting Renegade =

1939 film

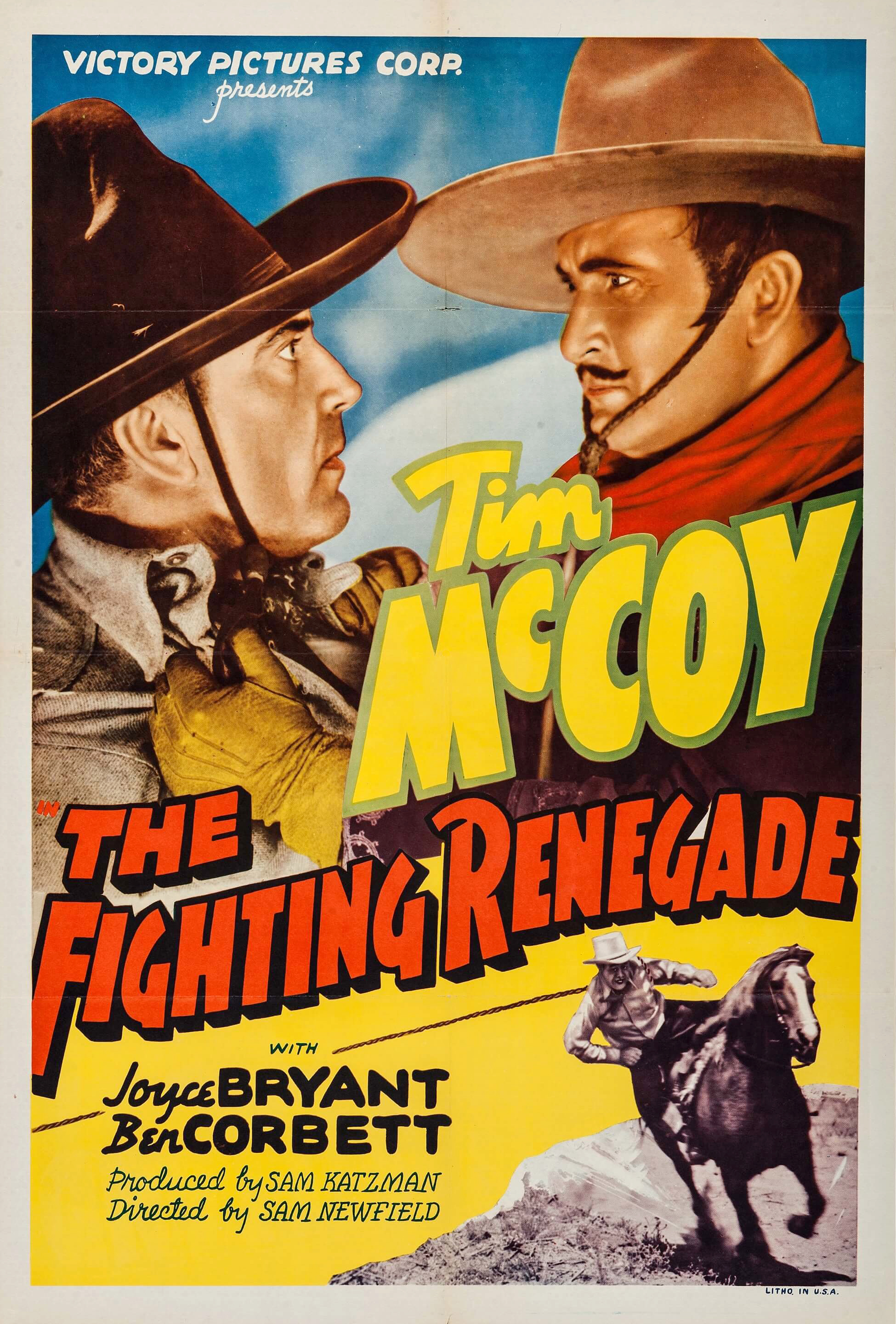
- Theatrical release poster
- Directed by: Sam Newfield
- Written by: William Lively
- Produced by: Sam Katzman
- Cinematography: Arthur Reed
- Edited by: Holbrook N. Todd
- Distributed by: Victory Pictures
- Release date: September 1, 1939
- Running time: 58 minutes
- Country: United States
- Language: English

The Fighting Renegade is a 1939 American western directed by Sam Newfield and produced by Sam Katzman for Katzman's Victory Pictures.

== Plot ==
Framed for the murder of an archaeologist, Bill Carson (Tim McCoy) assumes the identity of "El Puma," 'a gun-slinging Mexican vigilante", which allows him to clear as well as speak with a "Mexican" accent for much of the movie.

== Cast ==
- Tim McCoy as Bill Carson
- Joyce Bryant as Marian Willis
- Ben Corbett as Magpie
- Ted Adams as Link Benson
- Budd Buster as Old Dobie
- Dave O'Brien as Dr. Jerry Leonard
- Forrest Taylor as Prof. Lucius Lloyd
- Reed Howes as Sheriff
- John Elliott as Prospector
