= Joan Barclay =

American actress (1914–2002)

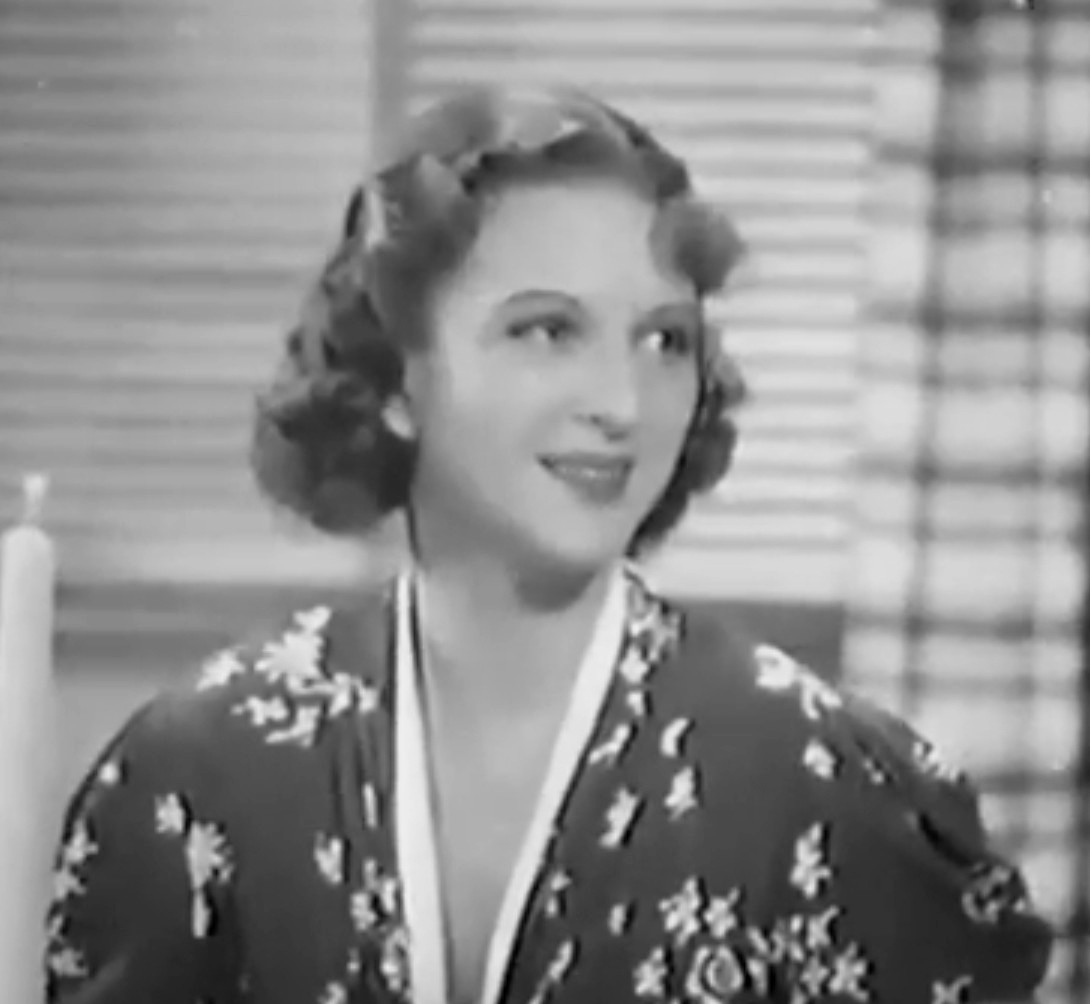
- Barclay in Amateur Crook (1937)
- Born: Mary Elizabeth Greear; August 31, 1914; Minneapolis, Minnesota, U.S.
- Died: November 22, 2002 (aged 88); Palm Desert, California, U.S.
- Other names: Geraine Greear
- Occupation: Actress
- Years active: 1927–1945
- Spouse: LeRoy D. Hillman (m. 1945; div. 1967)
- Children: 2

Joan Barclay (born Mary Elizabeth Greear; August 31, 1914 – November 22, 2002) was an American film actress of the 1930s and 1940s, starring mostly in B-movies and cliffhangers, with her career starting during the silent film era.

== Biography ==
=== Early life and career ===
The daughter of Mr. and Mrs. P. H. Greear, Barclay was born in Minneapolis, Minnesota. A 1923 newspaper item reported that she was "a singer and player" whose bird imitations had been broadcast on radio.

Her family moved to California when she was still a child due to her mother's wishing to escape the cold climate of the north. Moving to Hollywood to pursue acting, Barclay received her first role at the age of 12, which was credited with her billed as Geraine Greear, in the 1927 film The Gaucho, starring Douglas Fairbanks and Lupe Vélez. It was her only silent film. In 1930, still billed as Geraine Greear, she had a minor role in King of Jazz. She was the leading lady opposite Tom Tyler in the 1936 Western film Ridin' On.

=== Career in B-movies ===
In 1936, Barclay's career changed for the better when she began starring in Westerns opposite some of Hollywood's leading cowboy stars, including Tom Tyler, Bob Steele, Hoot Gibson, and Tom Keene. Her first Western starring role was opposite Tom Tyler in Ridin' On, followed by Feud of the West alongside Hoot Gibson, Glory Trail with Tom Keene, and Men of the Plains with Rex Bell, all in 1936. That year she received roles in other B-movies that were not Westerns as well, including the 1936 crime drama Prison Shadows, which starred Lucille Lund and Edward J. Nugent, and the action/adventure film Phantom Patrol starring opposite Kermit Maynard.

From early 1936 to 1939, Barclay had both starring and supporting roles in 35 films, almost all of which were B-movies, mainly Westerns, serials, or cliffhangers. Most had her playing the role of the heroine opposite the film's hero. During the latter part of the 1930s she starred alongside such cowboy stars as Slim Whitaker, Tim McCoy, Ben Corbett, Tex Fletcher, Bob Baker and also rejoined Edward J. Nugent in the 1937 adventure film Island Captives.

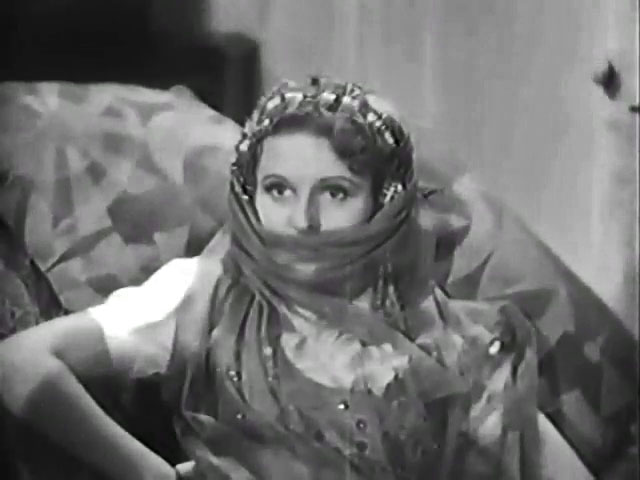
Joan Barclay in Amateur Crook (1937)

=== Later years ===
By 1940, Barclay was working steadily, averaging better than six films per year. From 1940 to 1945 she appeared in thirty-four films. However, by 1943 she had begun receiving more and more uncredited roles, a trend which would only increase with time. In 1944 she appeared in six films, four of which were uncredited. In 1945, she starred in the Charlie Chan mystery The Shanghai Cobra. It was her last film.

== Personal life ==
Barclay married Leroy Hillman on July 2, 1945, in Las Vegas.

== Death ==
Barclay died in Palm Desert, California, on November 22, 2002, aged 88.

== Selected filmography ==
- Feud of the West (1936) as Molly Henderson
- Prison Shadows (1936) as Mary Comstock
- Ridin' On (1936) as Gloria O'Neil
- Men of the Plains (1936) as Laura Long
- Island Captives (1937) as Helen Carsons
- The Trusted Outlaw (1937) as Betty Pember
- Sky Racket (1937) as Marion Bronson
- Whirlwind Horseman (1938) as Peggy Radford
- Pioneer Trail (1938) as Alice Waite
- Two Gun Justice (1938) as Nancy Brown
- The Gentleman from Arizona (1939) as Georgia Coburn
- Outlaws' Paradise (1939) as Jessie Treadwell
- Billy the Kid's Range War (1941) as Ellen Gorman
- Billy the Kid's Round-Up (1941) as Betty Webster
- Billy the Kid's Smoking Guns (1942) as Mrs. Howard
- Around the World (1943) (uncredited)
- Sagebrush Law (1943) as Sally Winters
- Rookies in Burma (1943) as Connie
- Ladies' Day (1943) as Joan Samuels
- Bombardier (1943) (uncredited)
- The Falcon in Danger (1943) as Hysterical girl
- Step Lively (1944) as Western Union clerk (uncredited)
- Music in Manhattan (1944) as Chorus girl
- Youth Runs Wild (1944) as Girl with Blanche (uncredited)
- The Falcon Out West (1944) as Mrs. Irwin
- The Shanghai Cobra (1945) as Paula Webb
