= Riders of the Dark =

1928 film

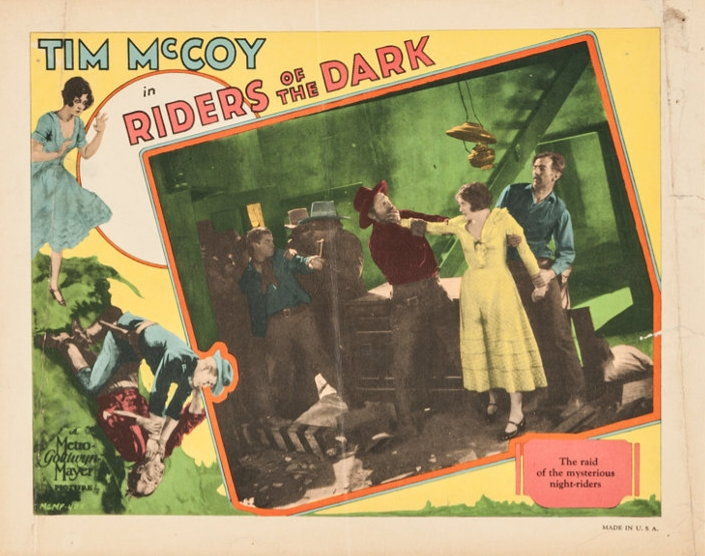
- Directed by: Nick Grinde
- Screenplay by: W. S. Van Dyke; Madeleine Ruthven
- Story by: W. S. Van Dyke
- Starring: Tim McCoy; Dorothy Dwan; Rex Lease; Roy D'Arcy; Frank Currier
- Cinematography: George Gordon Nogle
- Edited by: Dan Sharits
- Production company: Metro-Goldwyn-Mayer
- Distributed by: Metro-Goldwyn-Mayer
- Release date: April 21, 1928
- Running time: 60 minutes
- Country: United States
- Languages: Silent; English intertitles

Riders of the Dark is a 1928 American silent Western film directed by Nick Grinde and written by W. S. Van Dyke and Madeleine Ruthven. The film stars Tim McCoy, Dorothy Dwan, Rex Lease, Roy D'Arcy and Frank Currier. The film was released on April 21, 1928, by Metro-Goldwyn-Mayer.

== Cast ==
- Tim McCoy as Lt. Crane
- Dorothy Dwan as Molly Graham
- Rex Lease as Jim Graham
- Roy D'Arcy as Eagan
- Frank Currier as Old Man Redding
- Bert Roach as Sheriff Snodgrass
- Dick Sutherland as Rogers
