= Lightnin' Bill Carson =

1936 film by Sam Newfield

- Theatrical release poster
- Directed by: Sam Newfield
- Written by: George Arthur Durlam (story); Joseph O'Donnell (screenplay)
- Produced by: Sigmund Neufeld; Leslie Simmonds
- Starring: See below
- Cinematography: Jack Greenhalgh
- Edited by: John English
- Distributed by: Puritan Pictures
- Release date: April 15, 1936
- Running time: 75 minutes 71 minutes (DVD)
- Country: United States
- Language: English

Lightnin' Bill Carson is a 1936 American Western film directed by Sam Newfield.

== Plot summary ==
A lawman captures the notorious "Pecos Kid", who is tried and hanged for his crimes – then starts to have doubts as to whether the Kid actually committed the crimes.

== Cast ==
- Tim McCoy as U. S. Marshal "Lightnin" Bill Carson
- Lois January as Dolores Costello
- Rex Lease as The Pecos Kid / Fred Rand
- Harry Worth as Silent Tom Rand
- Karl Hackett as Stack Stone
- John Merton as Henchman Breed Hawkins
- Joseph W. Girard as Banker Mount
- Lafe McKee as Don Costello
