= The Fighting Fool =

1932 film

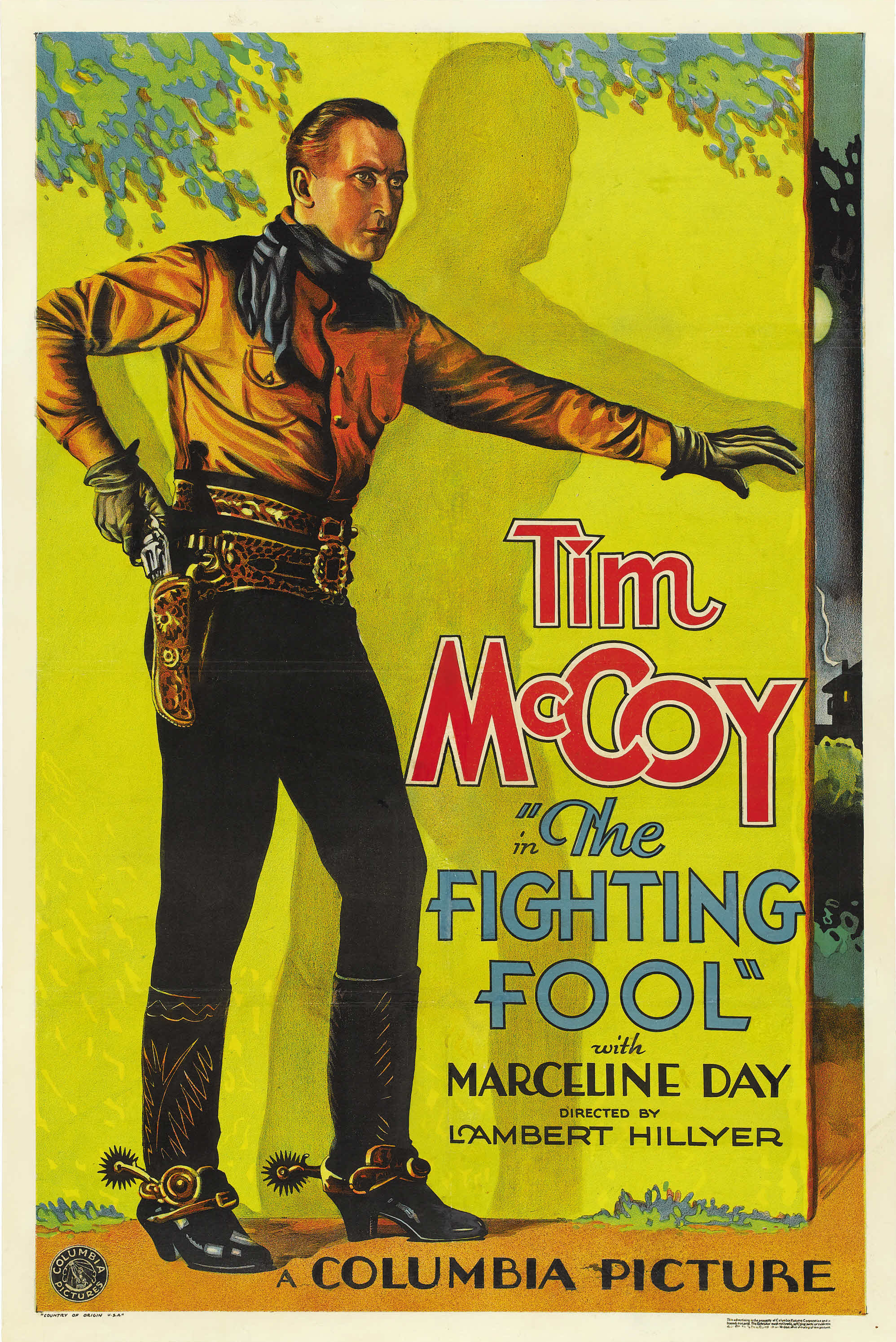
- Directed by: Lambert Hillyer
- Screenplay by: Frank Howard Clark
- Starring: Tim McCoy; Marceline Day; William V. Mong; Dorothy Granger
- Cinematography: Benjamin H. Kline
- Edited by: Otto Meyer
- Music by: Mischa Bakaleinikoff
- Production company: Columbia Pictures
- Distributed by: Columbia Pictures
- Release date: January 20, 1932
- Running time: 58 minutes
- Country: United States
- Language: English

The Fighting Fool is a 1932 American pre-Code Western film directed by Lambert Hillyer and released by Columbia Pictures starring Tim McCoy, Marceline Day, and William V. Mong.

== Plot ==
Sheriff Collins pursues a villain who erroneously thinks that his father was killed by the sheriff.

== Cast ==
- Tim McCoy as Sheriff Tim Collins
- Marceline Day as Judith
- William V. Mong as Uncle John Lyman
- Arthur Rankin as Bud Collins
- Dorothy Granger as Nina
- Harry Todd as Deputy Hoppy
- Bob Kortman as Henchman Charley
- Tom Bay as Waiter (uncredited)
- Ralph Bucko as Cowhand (uncredited)
- Mary Carr as Old Woman (uncredited)
- Dick Dickinson as Henchman (uncredited)
- Jack Evans as Henchman (uncredited)
- Herman Hack as Barfly (uncredited)
- Jack Hendricks as Cowhand (uncredited)
- Jack Kirk as 3rd Bartender (uncredited)
- Frank Lanning as Barfly (uncredited)
- Lew Meehan as Henchman (uncredited)
- Buck Moulton as Henchman (uncredited)
- James Sheridan as Barfly (uncredited)
- Al Taylor as Henchman (uncredited)
- Ethel Wales as Aunt Jane (uncredited)
- Slim Whitaker as Rancher (uncredited)
