= Hook, Line & Sinker (1969 film) =

1969 film by George Marshall

- Lobby card
- Directed by: George Marshall
- Screenplay by: Rod Amateau
- Story by: Rod Amateau; David Davis
- Produced by: Jerry Lewis
- Starring: Jerry Lewis
- Cinematography: W. Wallace Kelley
- Edited by: Russel Wiles
- Music by: Dick Stabile
- Color process: Technicolor
- Production company: Jerry Lewis Productions
- Distributed by: Columbia Pictures
- Release date: April 2, 1969 (United States)
- Running time: 92 minutes
- Country: United States
- Language: English
- Box office: 395,484 admissions (France)

Hook, Line & Sinker is a 1969 American comedy film produced by and starring Jerry Lewis. This was the final film for director George Marshall, whose career dated back to 1916, and Lewis' last film for Columbia Pictures.

== Plot ==
Before undergoing an operation at a hospital in Chile, Peter Ingersoll explains the origin of his unusual condition.

Peter, a California insurance salesman, learns that he only has a short time left to live. With his wife's encouragement, Peter embarks on an epic fishing excursion, accruing $100,000 of charges on his credit card. However, Dr. Carter contacts Peter to inform him that he was misdiagnosed and is not dying. Dr. Carter urges Peter to fake his death to avoid paying the enormous debt and to permit his wife to collect a $150,000 life-insurance policy. After seven years, when the statute of limitations expires, Peter can reappear. So Peter's doctor has an idea to fake Peter's death and has Peter go to Israel. When Peter comes back, he discovers his wife is now married to his doctor.

Meanwhile, back in California, Peter has a scheme of his own. He has a doctor's order to check out if the dead body in Peter's coffin is actually Peter. The police discover that the dead body is actually a dead Confederate Army colonel. There is an uproar over insurance fraud by Peter's wife and a malpractice suit over Peter's doctor.

Peter discovers that the entire plan was a scheme concocted by his wife and Dr. Carter, who are having an affair. He is determined to sabotage their plans. He breaks into his wife's and the doctor's hotel room. Peter instead finds himself on the operating table in Chile with a marlin piercing his chest. Peter tells the operating team to tell everyone that if he doesn't survive that he died a happy man.

== Cast ==
- Jerry Lewis as Peter Ingersoll / Fred Dobbs
- Peter Lawford as Dr. Scott Carter
- Anne Francis as Nancy Ingersoll
- Pedro Gonzalez Gonzalez as Perfecto
- Jimmy Miller as Jimmy Ingersoll
- Jennifer Edwards as Jennifer Ingersoll
- Eleanor Audley as Mrs. Durham
- Henry Corden as Kenyon Hammercher
- Sylvia Lewis as Karlotta Hammercher
- Phillip Pine as Head Surgeon
- Felipe Turich as Foreign Mortician
- Kathleen Freeman as Mrs. Hardtack - Baby Sitter

== Production ==
Hook, Line & Sinker was filmed under the working title Kook's Tour.

The film was shot from April 1 to June 20, 1968, at the Columbia Ranch in Burbank using the exterior of the same house seen in the television series Gidget (1965–66). The interior scenes were filmed on the same sound stage, including the interior and back yard of the home, that had been used for the television series Bewitched (1964–72), although the color scheme was substantially altered.

== Release ==
Hook, Line & Sinker opened nationwide on April 2, 1969. It was the first Jerry Lewis film released under the MPAA's new film rating system and was assigned a G rating.

=== Home media ===
The film was released on DVD on November 6, 2012. It was rereleased on DVD in a Jerry Lewis Triple Feature collection with Three on a Couch (1966) and Don't Raise the Bridge, Lower the River (1968) on January 16, 2018.

== Reception ==
In a contemporary review for The New York Times, critic Vincent Canby wrote: "[T]here is simply too much of the straight Jerry Lewis, a suburban husband who learns that he has only a few months to live and goes off on a credit card binge. Lewis's all-too evident arrogance and self-assurance are best hidden behind the masks of characters who make no call on pathos."

== See also ==
- List of American films of 1969
