= The Bushranger (1928 film) =

1928 film

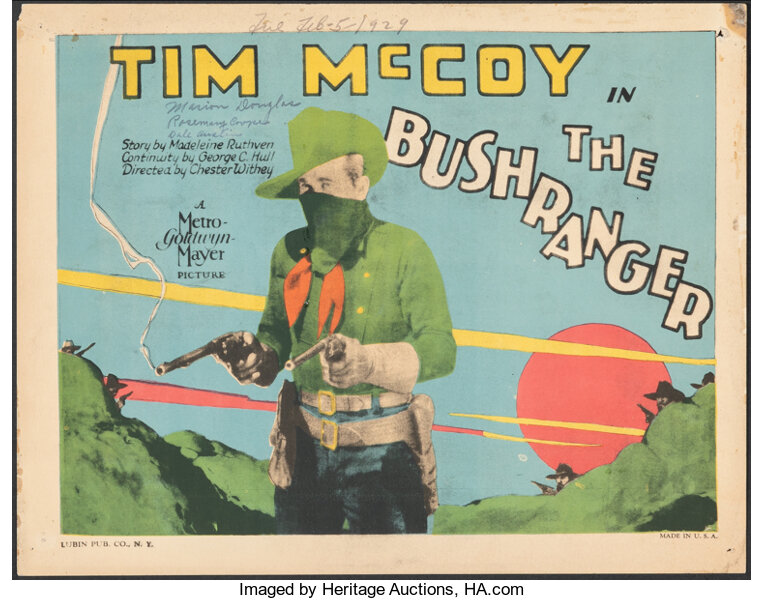
- Directed by: Chester Withey
- Screenplay by: George C. Hull; Paul Perez; Madeleine Ruthven
- Starring: Tim McCoy; Ena Gregory; Russell Simpson; Arthur Lubin; Ed Brady
- Cinematography: Arthur Reed
- Edited by: William LeVanway
- Production company: Metro-Goldwyn-Mayer
- Distributed by: Metro-Goldwyn-Mayer
- Release date: November 17, 1928
- Running time: 60 minutes
- Country: United States
- Languages: Silent; English intertitles

The Bushranger is a 1928 American silent Western film directed by Chester Withey and written by George C. Hull, Paul Perez, and Madeleine Ruthven. Set in Australia, the film stars Tim McCoy, Ena Gregory, Russell Simpson, Arthur Lubin and Ed Brady.

The film was released on November 17, 1928, by Metro-Goldwyn-Mayer.

== Plot ==
A gentleman is arrested for duelling and sentenced to Van Dieman's Land. He escapes and becomes a bushranger.

== Cast ==
- Tim McCoy as Edward
- Ena Gregory as Lucy
- Russell Simpson as Sir Eric
- Arthur Lubin as Arthur
- Ed Brady as Black Murphy
- Frank Baker as Blair
- Dale Austen as Dale
- Richard Neill as Col. Cavendish
- Rosemary Cooper as Lady Cavendish

== Production ==
The story was written by Madeleine Ruthven. It was made at the time there was a ban on such films being made in some Australian states. The film was reportedly made in response to criticism of too many Westerns being set in America. Frank Baker, brother of Snowy Baker had a role. Dale Austen was a former Miss New Zealand. This was her only Hollywood film.

== Preservation ==
With no holdings located in archives, The Bushranger is considered a lost film.

== See also ==
- Australian Western
