= Trigger Fingers (1939 film) =

1939 film

- Directed by: Sam Newfield
- Written by: Basil Dickey
- Produced by: Sam Katzman
- Starring: Tim McCoy; Joyce Bryant
- Cinematography: Bill Hyer
- Release date: 1939
- Country: United States
- Language: English

Trigger Fingers is a 1939 American Western film directed by Sam Newfield and starring Tim McCoy.

== Premise ==
"Lightning" Bill Carson and his sidekick Magpie go into town with friend Margaret, pose as gypsies and discover a crime ring masterminded by Bert Lee.

== Cast ==
- Tim McCoy as Bill Carson
- Joyce Bryant as Margaret
- Ben Corbett as Magpie
- Carleton Young as Bert Lee
- Kenne Duncan as Johnson
