= Madeleine Ruthven =

American screenwriter

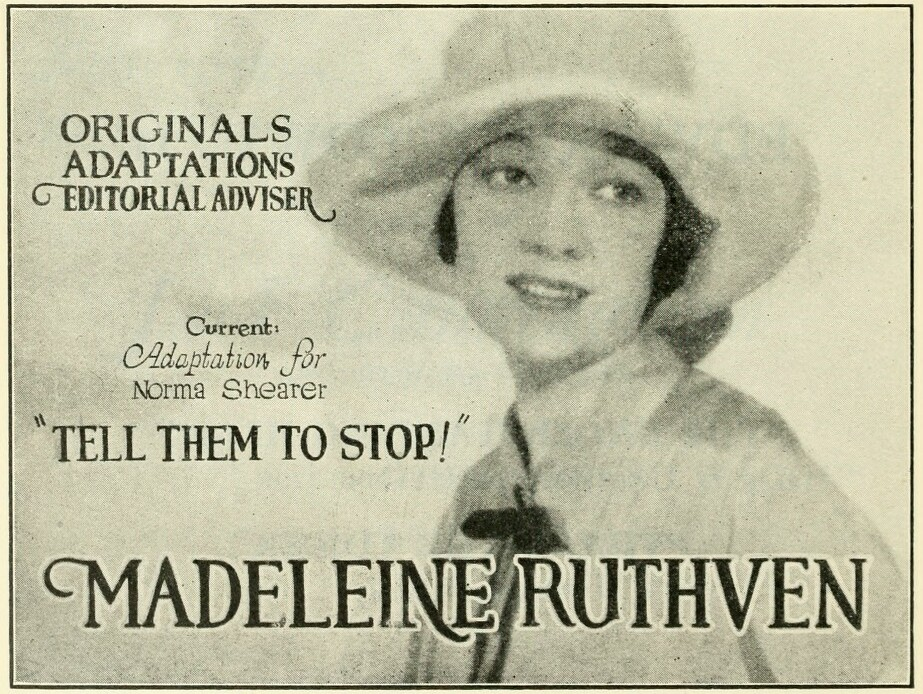
- Born: Madeleine Dwight Skinner; October 26, 1893; Hornick, Iowa, USA
- Died: February 20, 1978 (aged 84)
- Occupations: Screenwriter, poet
- Years active: 1923–1936

Madeleine Ruthven (October 26, 1893 – February 20, 1978) was an American screenwriter and poet active from 1923 to 1936.

== Biography ==
Born to Dwight Skinner and Catherine Bingham in Hornick, Iowa, Madeleine Dwight Skinner was raised in Houston alongside her four siblings. She got her start as a newspaperwoman, working for The Houston Press from 1918 to 1920, and fiction writer publishing in magazines like The Black Cat, before moving to Hollywood to pursue screenwriting.

Her first job in the industry was working for Marshall Neilan's production company. She began writing stories and title cards before moving her way into penning full screenplays. Many of the films she was credited on during her time in Hollywood were B-Westerns and police dramas.

In the 1950s, Ruthven was named by fellow screenwriter Richard J. Collins as a Communist sympathizer and put on the blacklist.

In addition to writing and/or contributing to over a dozen screenplays over the course of her years in the industry, she also wrote a book of poetry published by Los Angeles-based Primavera Press called Summer Denial. When asked why she took up writing poetry, Ruthven answered, "It's cheaper than getting psychoanalyzed." Another collection of poems was titled Sondelius Comes to the Mountains (1934).

Ruthven married her first husband, Samuel Ruthven, in 1918; the marriage ended in divorce. She married fellow progressive activist Reuben Borough in the 1950s.

== Selected filmography ==
- The Accusing Finger (1936)
- Straight from the Shoulder (1936)
- Dangerous Corner (1934)
- Shock (1934)
- Wu Li Chang (1930)
- The Ship from Shanghai (1930) (titles)
- Anna Christie (1930) (titles)
- The Bushranger (1928)
- The Rock of Friendship (1928)
- Spoilers of the West (1927)
- The Frontiersman (1927) (story)
- The Rendezvous (1923) (story)
