= The Frontiersman =

1927 film directed by Reginald Barker

- Directed by: Reginald Barker
- Screenplay by: Tom Miranda; Gordon Rigby
- Story by: Madeleine Ruthven; Ross B. Wills
- Starring: Tim McCoy; Claire Windsor; Tom O'Brien; Russell Simpson; Lillian Leighton; Louise Lorraine
- Cinematography: Clyde De Vinna
- Edited by: Frank Sullivan
- Production company: Metro-Goldwyn-Mayer
- Distributed by: Metro-Goldwyn-Mayer
- Release date: June 11, 1927
- Running time: 53 minutes
- Country: United States
- Languages: Silent; English intertitles

The Frontiersman is a lost 1927 American silent Western film directed by Reginald Barker and written by Tom Miranda and Gordon Rigby. The film stars Tim McCoy, Claire Windsor, Tom O'Brien, Russell Simpson, Lillian Leighton and Louise Lorraine. The film was released on June 11, 1927, by Metro-Goldwyn-Mayer.

== Plot ==
John Dale and Abner Hawkins are members of Andrew Jackson’s Tennessee Militia, assigned to make peace with the Creek Indian tribe and the treacherous White Snake.

== Cast ==
- Tim McCoy as John Dale
- Claire Windsor as Lucy
- Tom O'Brien as Abner Hawkins
- Russell Simpson as Andrew Jackson
- Lillian Leighton as Mrs. Andrew Jackson
- Louise Lorraine as Athalie Burgoyne
- May Foster as Mandy
- Chief John Big Tree as Grey Eagle
- Frank Hagney as White Snake
- Hans Joby as Col. Coffee

== Preservation ==
With no holdings located in archives, The Frontiersman is considered a lost film.
