= Texas Wildcats =

1939 film

- Directed by: Sam Newfield
- Written by: George H. Plympton
- Produced by: Sam Katzman
- Starring: Tim McCoy
- Production company: Victory Pictures
- Release date: 1939
- Running time: 58 mins
- Country: United States
- Language: English

Texas Wildcats is a 1939 American Western film starring Tim McCoy.

== Plot ==
Lightning Bill McCoy disguises himself as an outlaw, the Phantom, to track down the murderer of his partner.
