= Feud of the West =

1936 film by Harry L. Fraser

- Directed by: Harry L. Fraser
- Written by: Russell A. Bankson; Phil Dunham; Roger Allman; Walton Farrar
- Produced by: Walter Futter
- Starring: Hoot Gibson; Buzz Barton; Bob Kortman
- Cinematography: Ted D. McCord
- Edited by: Carl Himm
- Production company: Diversion Pictures
- Distributed by: Grand National Pictures
- Release date: April 15, 1936
- Running time: 62 minutes
- Country: United States
- Language: English

Feud of the West is a 1936 American Western film directed by Harry L. Fraser and starring Hoot Gibson, Buzz Barton and Bob Kortman. It is a B film made by the Poverty Row company Diversion Pictures.

== Cast ==
- Hoot Gibson as 'Whitey' Revel
- Buzz Barton as Six Bits
- Bob Kortman as 'Hawk' Decker
- Ed Cassidy as Greg Walters
- Joan Barclay as Molly Henderson
- Nelson McDowell as Wild Horse Henderson
- Reed Howes as Bart Hunter
- Lew Meehan as Rockin U Cowhand Lew
- Roger Williams as Rockin U Cowhand Johnnie

== Bibliography ==
- Boyd Magers & Michael G. Fitzgerald. Westerns Women: Interviews with 50 Leading Ladies of Movie and Television Westerns from the 1930s to the 1960s. McFarland, 2004.
