= Straight Shooter (1939 film) =

1939 film

- Directed by: Sam Newfield
- Written by: Basil Dickey (writer); Joseph O'Donnell (writer)
- Produced by: Sam Katzman (producer)
- Starring: See below
- Cinematography: Arthur Reed
- Edited by: Holbrook N. Todd; Frederick Bain
- Music by: Oliver Wallace
- Release date: 1939
- Running time: 54 minutes 49 minutes (American DVD)
- Country: United States
- Language: English

Straight Shooter is a 1939 American Western film directed by Sam Newfield.

== Cast ==
- Tim McCoy as "Lightning" Bill Carson
- Julie Sheldon as Margaret Martin
- Ben Corbett as Magpie Benson
- Ted Adams as Brainard
- Reed Howes as Henchman Slade
- Forrest Taylor as Henchman Luke Green
- Budd Buster as Sheriff Ed Long
- Carl Mathews as Henchman Lane
