= Sky Racket (video game) =

2019 shooter game

- Developer: Double Dash Studios
- Publisher: Double Dash Studios
- Engine: Unity
- Platform: Linux; macOS; Microsoft Windows
- Release: Microsoft Windows, macOS and Linux: October 22, 2019
- Genres: Indie game, Shoot 'em up, Block breaker
- Modes: Single-player, Multiplayer

Sky Racket is a video game developed by Brazilian indie game developer Double Dash Studios. Originally named RacketBoy, the development began in 2015 at Indie Vs Gamers, a 72-hour game jam hosted by Game Jolt. The game was featured on PAX East 2019. It was released for Microsoft Windows, macOS and Linux on October 22, 2019, with a console launch set for 2020. The game is a mixture of block breakers and shoot 'em ups (its cartoon environments make it a cute 'em up), which makes it the first Shmup Breaker. The animated intro was featured on Tokyo Game Show.

== Gameplay ==
After choosing between RacketGirl and RacketBoy (or both, as the game has local co-op mode), The gameplay focuses on dodging enemies and laser beams while hitting energy balls back at the enemies as the player flies through the worlds. It's an easy to pick-up game with gameplay rooted in classic 16-bit arcade games with uncomplicated controls. At the end of each level (referred to in-game as a set), the score made during the match and the achievements are shown.

The main adventure sprawls over 5 different worlds with different sets and boss fights (referred to as match points), which are accessed through a map. Each world has its unique quirks with different mechanics, enemies and extra objectives. During the game the players can rescue Buddies who can then be used in earlier levels, giving them new ways to replay and improve their performances.

== Plot ==
RacketGirl and RacketBoy are guardians chosen by the Capybara Goddess to save the galaxy from the paws of the terrible tyrant genius, Korrg.

They fly through colorful planets and fight against hordes of crazy enemies to save the galaxy. Armed with magical Sky Rackets, they deflect attacks made by enemies. They fight against giant banana monsters, luchador raccoons and sentient popcorn in order to eventually reach the evil tyrant Korrg and save the imprisoned Capybara Goddess that watches over the galaxy.

== Reception ==
=== Achievements and Accolades ===
==== Indie Vs Gamers ====
Year	Result
2015	Won

==== SBGames ====
Year	Award	Result
2015	Game Under Development	Finalist
2015	Best Game	Finalist
2015	Best Visual Art	Finalist
2019	Professional	Finalist

==== Indie Megabooth ====
Year	Official Selection
2019	Pax East Showcase 2019

==== BIG Festival ====
Year	Award	Result
2019	Best Brazilian Game	Finalist
2019	Best Gameplay	Finalist
