= Phantom Ranger (film) =

1938 film by Sam Newfield

- Theatrical release poster
- Directed by: Sam Newfield
- Written by: Stanley Roberts; Joseph O'Donnell; Joseph O'Donnell
- Produced by: Maurice Conn
- Starring: Tim McCoy; Suzanne Kaaren; Karl Hackett
- Cinematography: Jack Greenhalgh
- Edited by: Richard G. Wray
- Production company: Conn Picturees
- Distributed by: Monogram Pictures
- Release date: May 27, 1938
- Running time: 53 minutes
- Country: United States
- Language: English

Phantom Ranger is a 1938 American Western film directed by Sam Newfield and starring Tim McCoy, Suzanne Kaaren and Karl Hackett.

== Cast ==
- Tim McCoy as Tim Hayes
- Suzanne Kaaren as Joan Doyle
- Karl Hackett as Sharpe
- John St. Polis as Pat Doyle
- John Merton as Henchman Bud
- Edward Earle as Matthews
- Robert Frazer as Chief McGregor
- Harry Strang as Henchman Jeff
- Charles King as Henchman Dan
- Richard Cramer as Barton
- Tom London as Reynolds
- Bruce Warren as Rogers
- Robert McKenzie as Saloon-Owner Charlie
- Jimmy Aubrey as Telegraph Operator
