= Sky Racket (film) =

1937 film by Sam Katzman

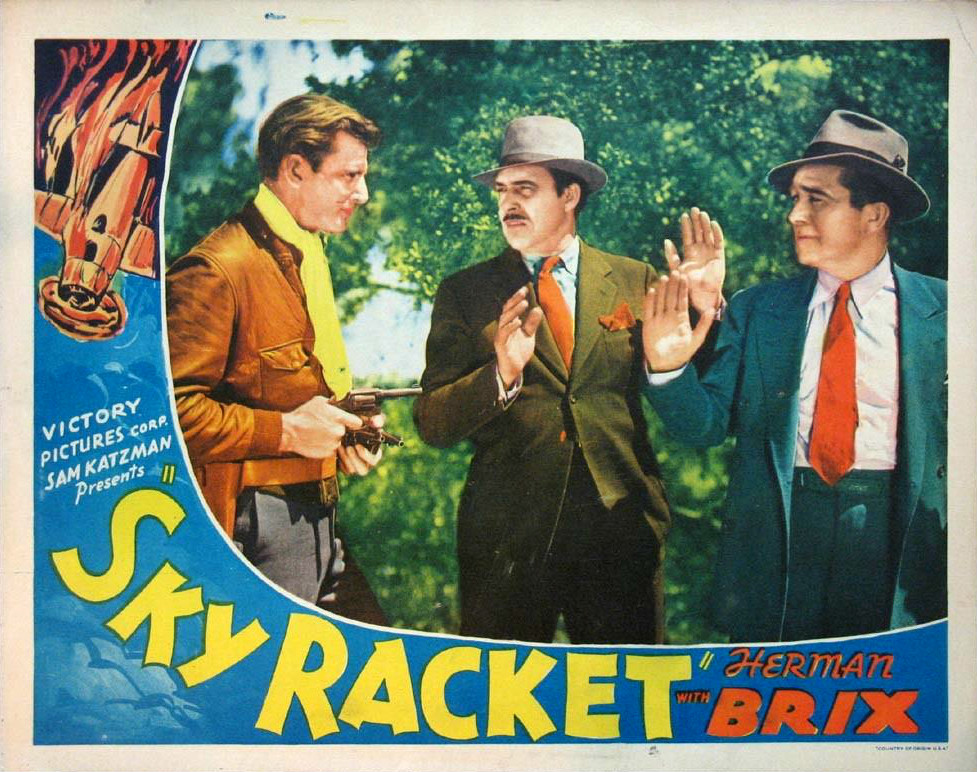
- Lobby card
- Directed by: Sam Katzman
- Written by: Basil Dickey
- Produced by: Sam Katzman
- Starring: Bruce Bennett, Joan Barclay, Duncan Renaldo
- Distributed by: Victory Pictures
- Release date: 1937
- Running time: 63 minutes
- Country: United States
- Language: English

Sky Racket is a 1937 American drama film directed by Sam Katzman and starring Bruce Bennett, Joan Barclay, and Duncan Renaldo.

== Plot ==
Marion Bronson (Barclay), aided by her maid Jenny (McDaniel), flees an arranged marriage with Count Barksi (Renaldo). After stowing away on an airplane piloted by government agent Eric Lane (Bennett), the plane crashes and the duo end up being taken hostage by crooks.

== Cast ==
- Bruce Bennett as Eric Lane - Agent 17 (credited as Herman Brix)
- Joan Barclay as Marion Bronson
- Duncan Renaldo as Count Barksi
- Monte Blue as Benjamin Arnold
- Hattie McDaniel as Jenny
- Jack Mulhall as Henchman Meggs
- Roger Williams as Henchman Nick Reagan
- Edward Earle as FBI Chief Maddox
- Earle Hodgins as Henchman Spike Hodgins
- Frank Wayne as Henchman Pete
- Ed Cassidy as FBI Agent Wilks
