= The Fighting Marshal =

1931 film

- Film poster
- Directed by: D. Ross Lederman
- Written by: Frank Howard Clark (story); Frank Howard Clark (adaptation); Frank Howard Clark (dialogue)
- Starring: Tim McCoy
- Cinematography: Benjamin H. Kline (as Benjamin Kline)
- Edited by: Otto Meyer
- Production company: Columbia Pictures
- Distributed by: Columbia Pictures
- Release date: November 25, 1931
- Running time: 58 minutes
- Country: United States
- Language: English

The Fighting Marshal is a 1931 American pre-Code Western film directed by D. Ross Lederman and starring Tim McCoy.

== Plot ==
Tim Benton is falsely accused of killing his own father and escapes from prison along with brutish Red Larkin. The fugitives head for the former Benton mine now operated by the villainous John Sebastian, where Tim plans to rob the payroll. En route, they are discovered by Bob Dinsmore, the new marshal of Silver City, who is killed by Red.

== Cast ==
- Tim McCoy as Tim Benton
- Dorothy Gulliver as Alice Wheeler
- Matthew Betz as Red Larkin
- Mary Carr as Aunt Emily
- Pat O'Malley as Deputy Ed Myers
- Edward LeSaint as Warden Decker
- Harry Todd as Pop
