= Tim McCoy =

American actor and television host (1891–1978)

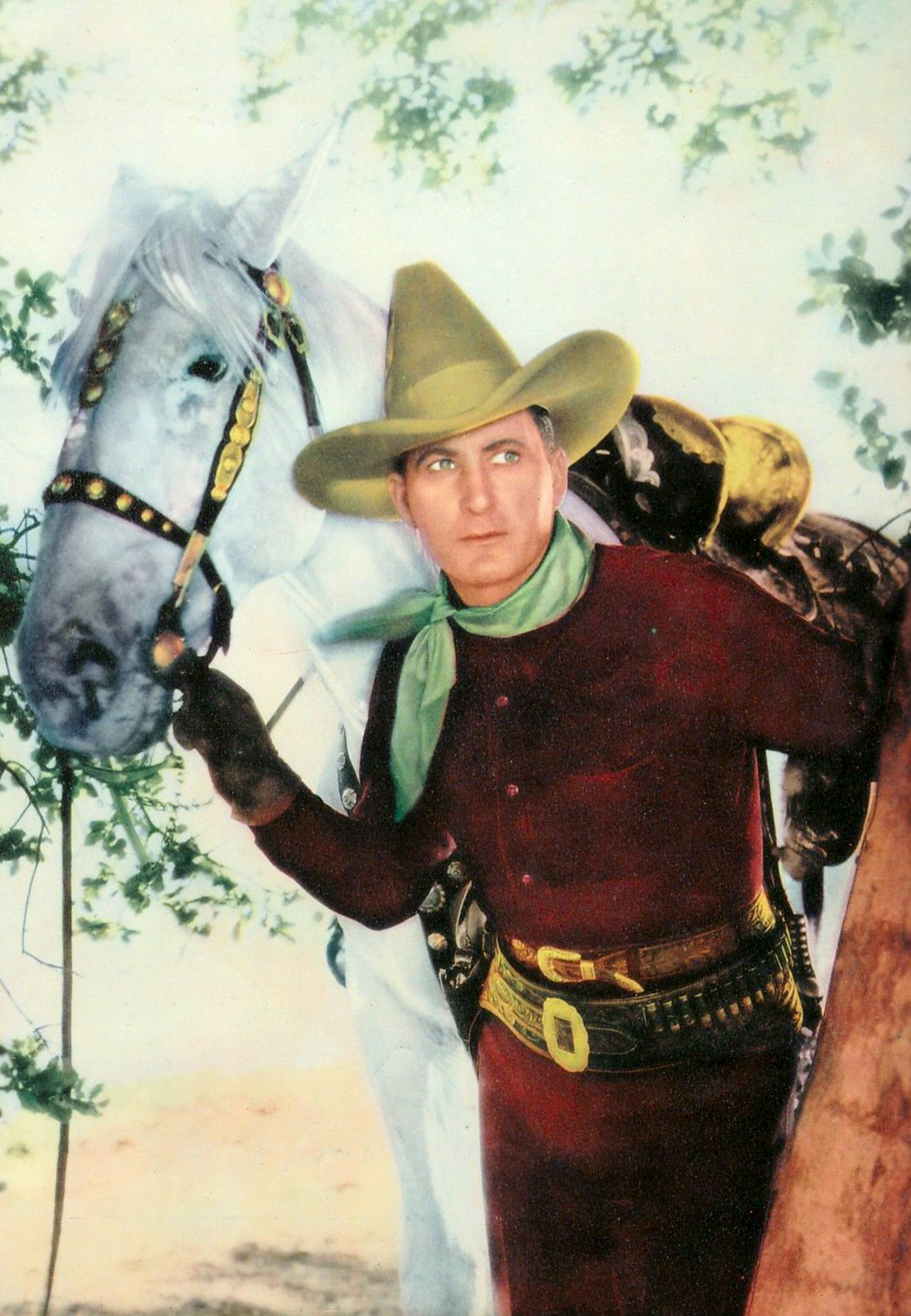
- McCoy in 1934
- Born: April 10, 1891; Saginaw, Michigan, U.S.
- Died: January 29, 1978 (aged 86); Ft. Huachuca, Arizona, U.S.
- Occupations: Actor; showman; television host
- Years active: 1925–1965
- Spouses: Agnes Heron Miller (m. 1917; div. 1931) Inga Arvad (m. 1946; died 1973)
- Children: 5

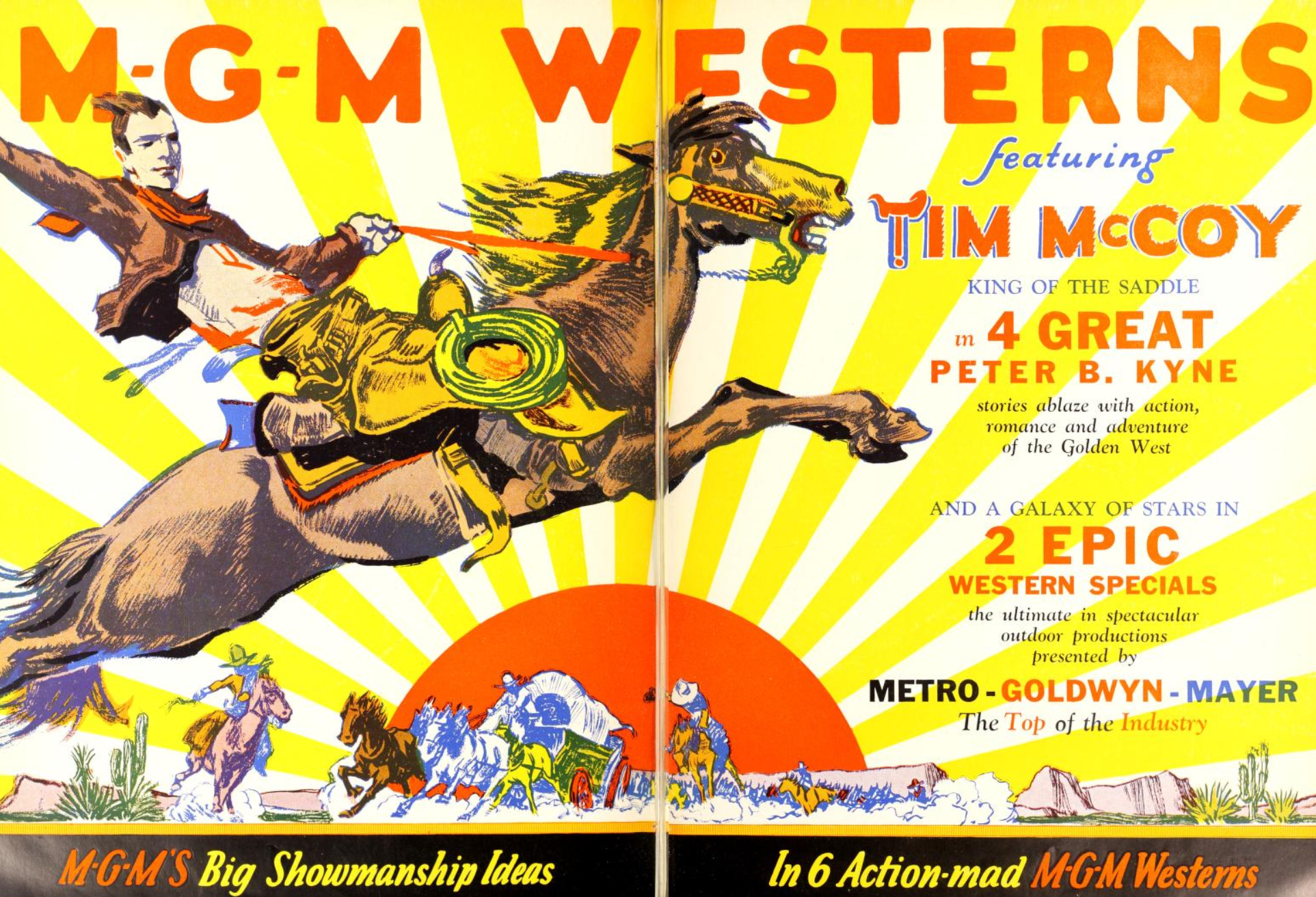
Tim McCoy ad in Motion Picture News, 1926

Colonel Timothy John Fitzgerald McCoy (April 10, 1891 – January 29, 1978) was an American actor, military officer, and expert on American Indian life. McCoy is most noted for his roles in B-grade Western films. As a popular cowboy film star, he had his picture on the front of a Wheaties cereal box.

== Early years ==
Tim McCoy was born in Saginaw, Michigan, on April 10, 1891. His father was an Irish Union Civil War veteran and Police Chief. While attending St. Ignatius College (now Loyola University), McCoy saw a Wild West show that influenced him to purchase a one-way ticket west. He ended up in Lander, Wyoming, where he worked as a ranch hand. While there, he became an expert horseman and roper while developing an extensive knowledge of the customs and languages of the local American Indian tribes. McCoy was a renowned expert in Indian sign language and was named "High Eagle" by the Arapaho tribe of the Wind River reservation. He also competed in numerous rodeos.

== Military career ==
McCoy enlisted as a soldier in the U.S. Army and served in the cavalry during World War I (although he did not serve in combat nor overseas). He served again in World War II in Europe, rising to the rank of colonel with the Army Air Corps and Army Air Forces. He also served as adjutant general of Wyoming between the wars with the brevet rank of brigadier general. At 28, he was one of the youngest brigadier generals in the history of the U.S. Army.

== Acting career ==
=== Early career ===
In 1922, David Townsend, president of the Mountain Plains Enterprise Film Company, planned to build "Sunshine Studios" at McCoy's Owl Creek Dude ranch in order to shoot a film titled, "The Dude Wrangler," written by Caroline Lockhart but the project was abandoned.

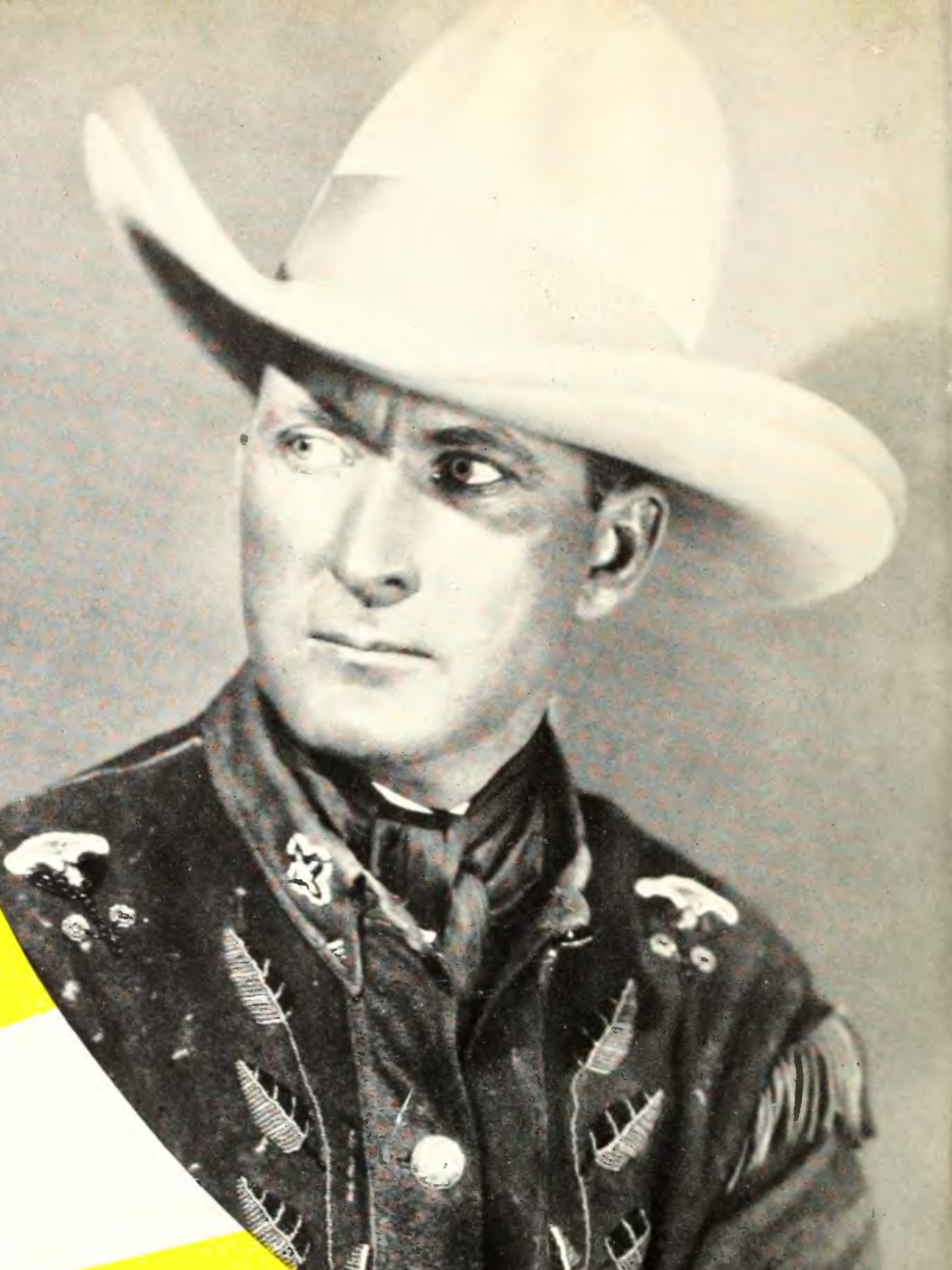
Portrait from Tim McCoy ad in Motion Picture News, 1926

That same year, he was asked by the head of Famous Players–Lasky, Jesse L. Lasky, to provide American Indian extras for the Western extravaganza, The Covered Wagon (1923). He brought hundreds of Indians to the Utah location and served as a technical advisor on the film. After filming was completed, McCoy was asked to bring a much smaller group of Indians to Hollywood, for a stage presentation preceding each showing of the film.

McCoy's stage show was popular, running eight months in Hollywood and several more months in London and Paris. McCoy returned to his Wyoming ranch, but Irving Thalberg of MGM soon signed him to a contract to star in a series of outdoor adventures and McCoy rose to stardom. His first MGM feature was War Paint (1926), featuring epic scenes of the Wind River Indians on horseback, staged by McCoy and director Woody Van Dyke. (Footage from War Paint was reused in many low-budget Westerns, well into the 1950s.)

War Paint set the tone for future McCoy Westerns, in that Indians were always portrayed sympathetically, and never as bloodthirsty savages. One notable McCoy feature for MGM was The Law of the Range (1928), in which he starred with Joan Crawford.

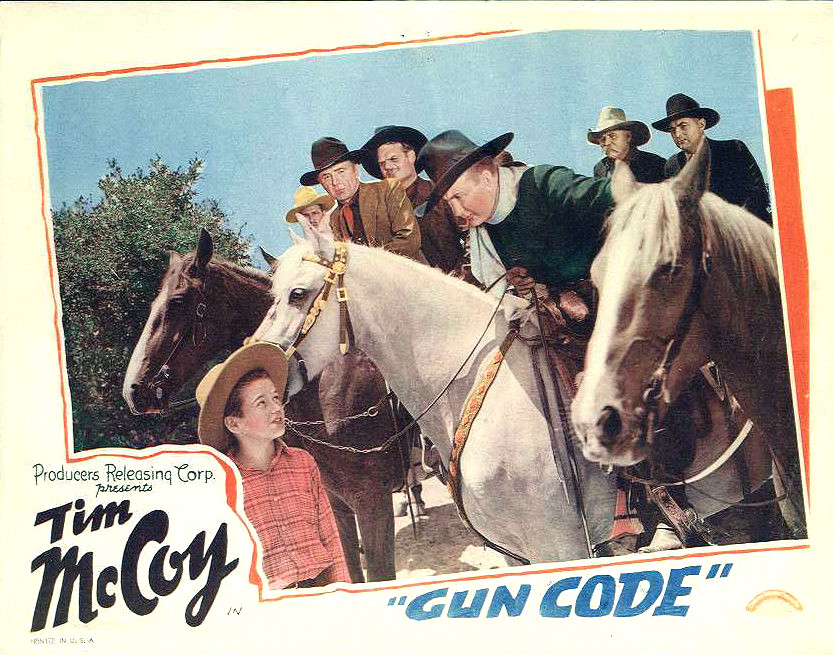
McCoy on horse in Gun Code, 1940

The coming of talking pictures, and the temporary difficulty in recording sound outdoors, resulted in MGM terminating its Tim McCoy series and McCoy returning once more to his ranch. In 1929 he was summoned back to Hollywood personally by Carl Laemmle of Universal Pictures, who insisted that McCoy star in the first talking Western serial, The Indians Are Coming. The action was filmed on an epic scale, and footage from The Indians Are Coming was reused for years in Universal westerns and serials. The Indians Are Coming was very successful, leading to another Tim McCoy serial for Universal, Heroes of the Flames (1931).

== Columbia Pictures ==
Harry Cohn ran Columbia, then a small, struggling studio trying to improve its standing in the industry. Cohn often hired stars who had just been dismissed by larger companies, giving Columbia features the name value of important players. Tim McCoy joined Columbia in 1931, and remained with the studio for four years, making over 30 new films. One of his best-known Columbia credits is Two Fisted Law (1932) with John Wayne and Walter Brennan.

In 1935, Cohn decided he wanted a younger cowboy hero (Charles Starrett got the job), and McCoy was released. That same year he signed with independent producer Sam Katzman, whose films had lower budgets and shorter schedules than Columbia's. McCoy had no qualms about working under these lesser conditions, but he did insist on his standard salary of $4,000 weekly (about $96,500 in 2026). Katzman agreed, and McCoy made a string of outdoor adventures.

Then McCoy was temporarily absent from the Hollywood scene. The Ringling Brothers Circus offered him a chance to tour with their show, and then McCoy formed his own "wild west" show. The latter venture was not a success; it was reported to have lost $300,000 (about $6,880,000 in 2026), one third of which was McCoy's own money. It folded in Washington, D.C., and the cowboy performers were each given $5 and McCoy's thanks. The Indians on the show were returned to their respective reservations by the Bureau of Indian Affairs.

McCoy was available for pictures again in 1938, and low-budget producers (including Sam Katzman and Maurice Conn) engaged him at his standard salary of $4,000 weekly, for eight films a year. In 1941 Buck Jones recruited McCoy to co-star in "The Rough Riders" series, alongside Jones and Raymond Hatton. The eight films, released by Monogram Pictures, were very popular, and might have continued but McCoy declined to renew his contract, opting to pursue other interests. Monogram made one more picture with Jones and Hatton, and then Jones died in the Cocoanut Grove fire of 1942.

=== Interrupted by World War II ===
In 1942, McCoy ran for the Republican nomination for the open U.S. Senate Seat from Wyoming. During that campaign, he established the first statewide radio hookup in Wyoming broadcasting history. He lost in the primary and within 48 hours volunteered for active duty with the U.S. Army.

He had maintained his Army Reserve commission and was immediately accepted. McCoy spent the war in the U.S. Army and performed liaison work with the Army Air Forces in Europe, receiving several decorations. He retired from the Army, and reportedly never lived in Wyoming again. His Eagle's Nest ranch was sold. He retired from acting in films after the war, except for a few cameo appearances much later, as in the all-star blockbuster Around the World in 80 Days (1956).

=== Television host ===
McCoy hosted a KTLA television show in Los Angeles in 1952, titled The Tim McCoy Show, for children on weekday afternoons and Saturdays, in which he provided authentic history lessons on the Old West and showed his old Western movies. His co-host was the actor Iron Eyes Cody who, while of Italian lineage, played an American Indian both on and off screen. McCoy won a local Emmy for "Best Children's Show" but did not attend to receive the award. He was competing against Webster Webfoot, a puppet character seen in McCoy's time slot on another station. McCoy refused to show up at the ceremony, saying "I'll be damned if I'm going to sit there and get beaten by a talking duck!"

McCoy launched his own syndicated show in 1955, distributed by U. M. & M. Television Corp. It was successful, ranking between #25 and #35 in popularity in some markets.

McCoy was such an established expert on American Indian lore that he often guested on other radio and TV programs. A 1955 episode of CBS Radio's The Amos 'n' Andy Music Hall had Charles Correll as Andy addressing McCoy, "I guess it was rugged in Wyoming in those days. The Indians weren't too long off the warpath." To which McCoy replied, "Yes, it took a lot of courage to go into an Indian barber shop and say 'just take a little off the top'."

== Personal life ==
McCoy’s first wife was the actress Agnes Heron Miller, the daughter of Henry Miller and Bijou Heron. They had two sons and a daughter and were divorced on July 20, 1931. Henry Miller was the director and producer of La Tendresse, in which Ronald Colman made his last stage appearance. Colman was to become McCoys closest friend in Hollywood and godfather to one of his sons, who was named after him. McCoy was best man at Colman’s wedding to Benita Hume and became godfather to his daughter Juliet. McCoy’s second wife was Inga Arvad whom he married in 1947. They had two sons, Ronnie and Terry. McCoy was married to Arvad until her death from cancer in 1973. Arvad was a journalist from Denmark, investigated by the FBI in the early 1940s due to rumors that she was a Nazi spy. There were photographs of Arvad as a guest of Adolf Hitler at the 1936 Olympics, and she had twice interviewed him. This investigation included the wiretapping of Arvad during a brief affair with John F. Kennedy in late 1941 and 1942, when Kennedy was serving in the U.S. Navy. No evidence of spying against Arvad was ever found.

== Later years ==
In 1976, he was interviewed at length by author James Horwitz for the cowboy memoir They Went Thataway. McCoy's final, posthumous, appearance was in Hollywood (1980), Kevin Brownlow-David Gill's television history of silent films.

McCoy died as the result of heart disease on January 29, 1978, at the Raymond W. Bliss Army Medical Center of Ft. Huachuca in Sierra Vista, Arizona. He was cremated and his ashes returned to his Nogales home. Nine years later his remains, and those of his wife, Inga, who had died in 1973, were returned to his birthplace at Saginaw, Michigan, for burial in the Mount Olivet Cemetery next to his family's plot.

=== Legacy ===
For his contribution to the film industry, McCoy was honored with a star on the Hollywood Walk of Fame. In 1973, he was inducted into the Hall of Great Western Performers of the National Cowboy and Western Heritage Museum. He was inducted into the Cowboy Hall of Fame in 1974.

On January 16, 2010, McCoy was inducted into the Hot Springs County (Wyoming) Hall of Fame. Accepting the honor on his behalf was his son, Terry. Included in the 2010 class were Governor Dave Freudenthal of the State of Wyoming, Chief Justice of the Wyoming Supreme Court Bart Voigt, former Wyoming state treasurer Stan Smith, and local high school teacher Karl Allen.

== Filmography ==
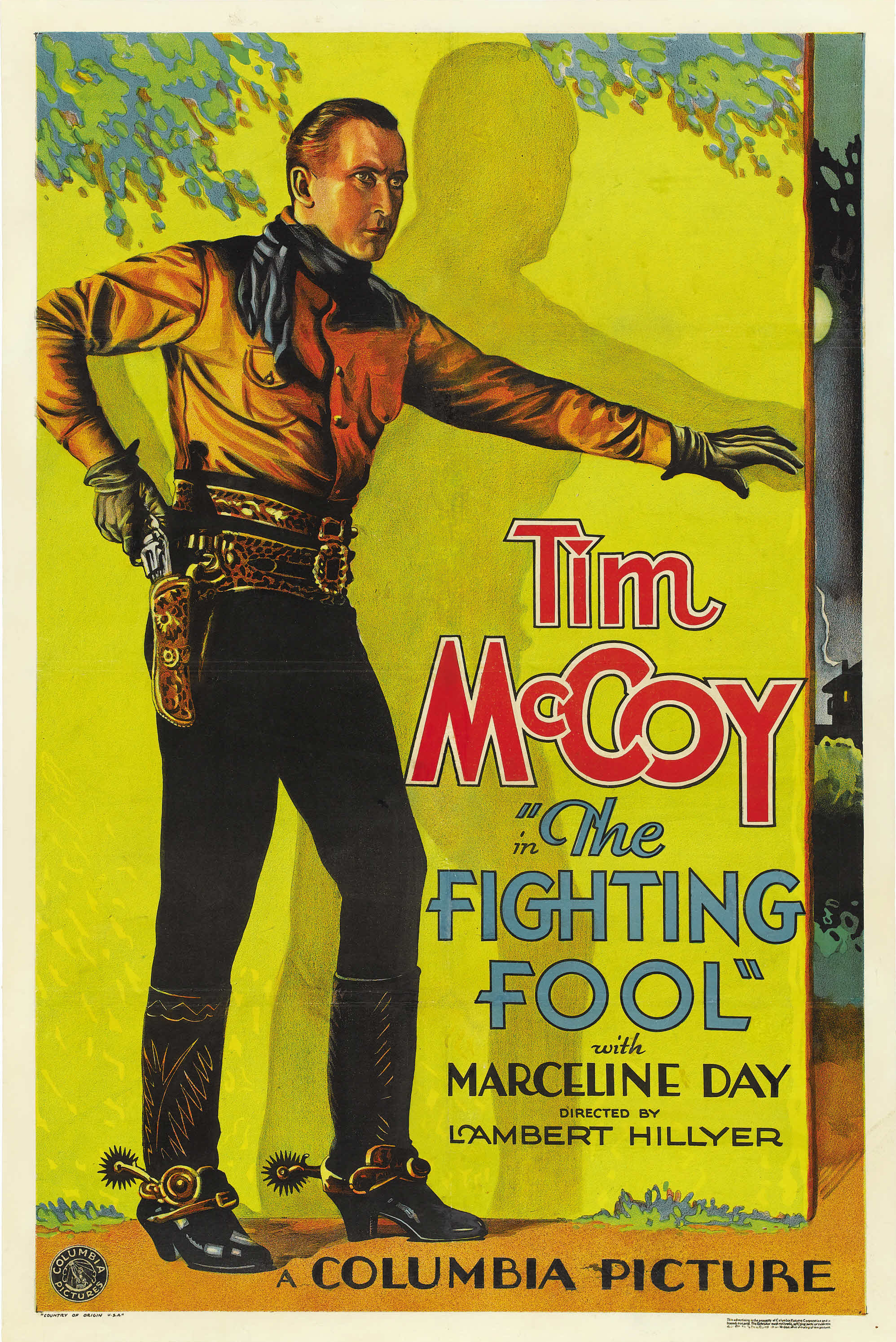
Poster for The Fighting Fool (1932)

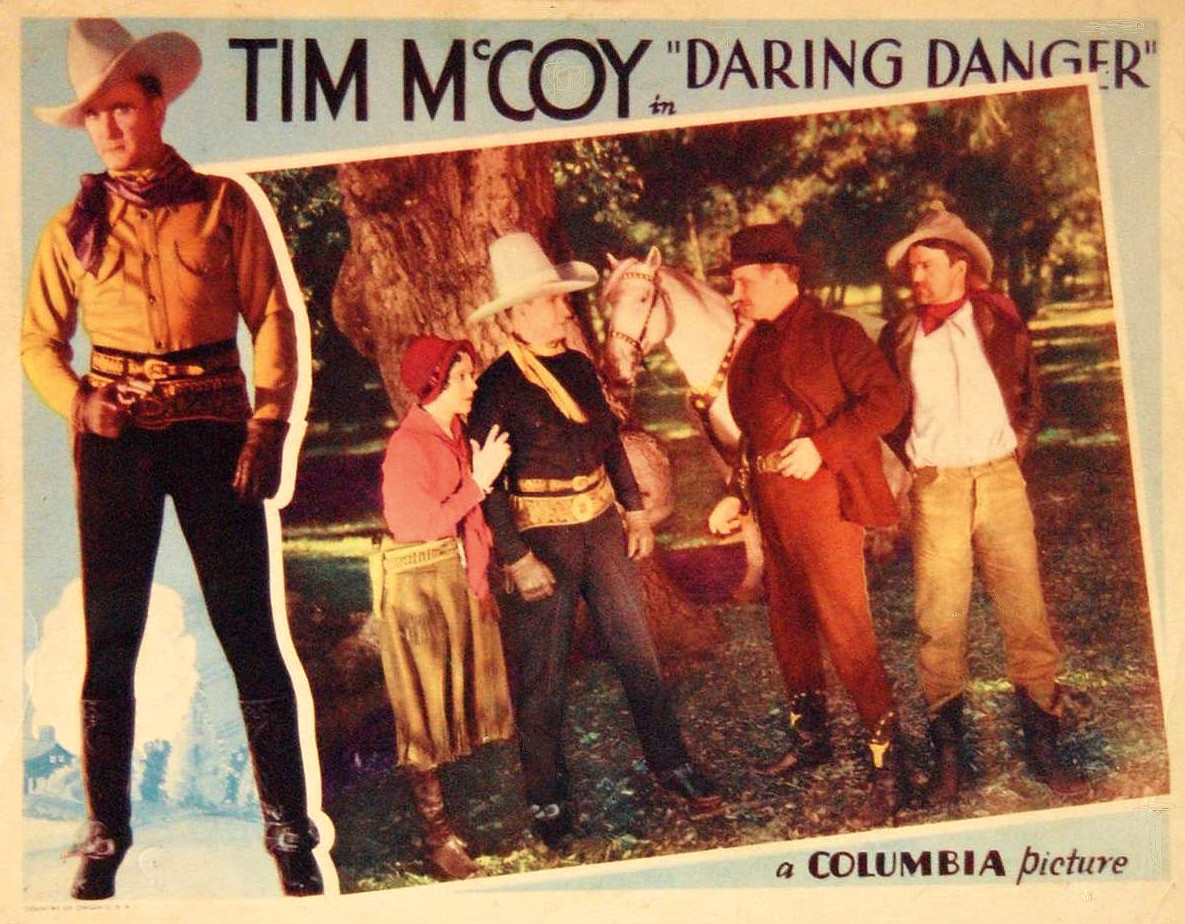
Lobby card for Daring Danger (1932)

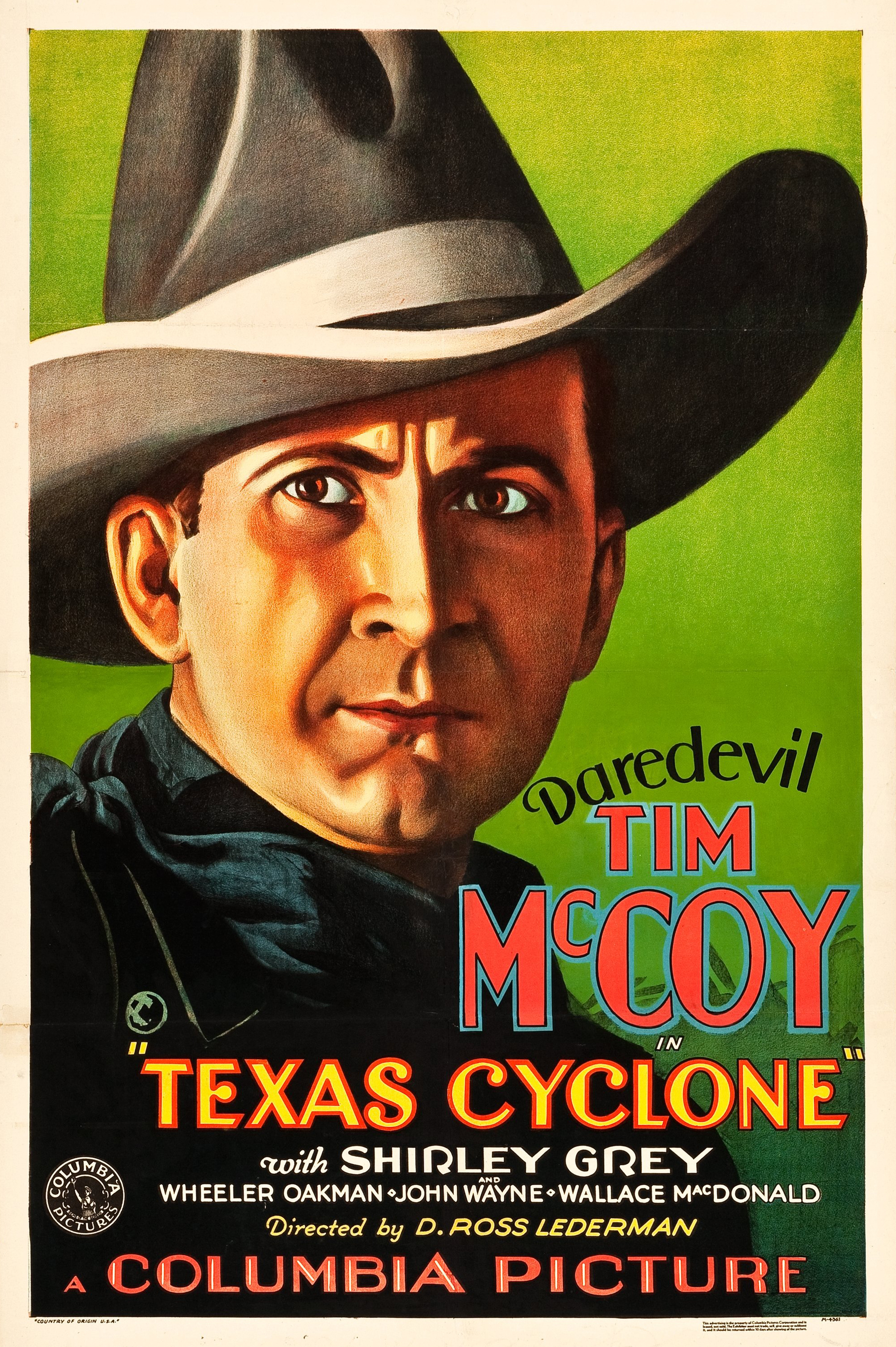
Poster for Texas Cyclone (1932)

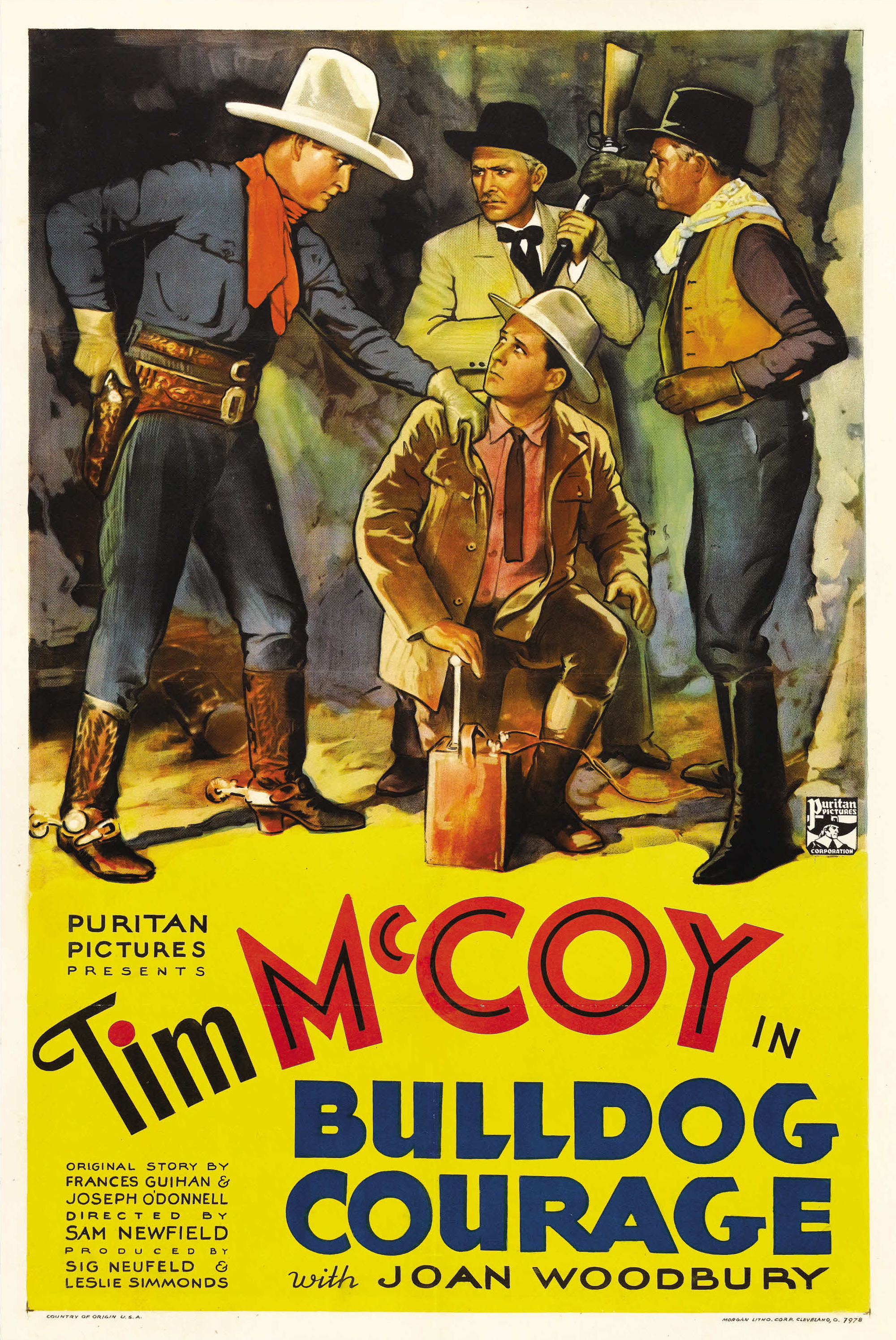
Poster for Bulldog Courage (1935)

Year	Title	Role	Notes
1925	The Thundering Herd	Burn Hudnall	
1926	War Paint	Lt. Tim Marshall	
1927	Winners of the Wilderness	Col. O'Hara	
1927	California	Capt. Archibald Gillespie	
1927	The Frontiersman	John Dale	
1927	Foreign Devils	Capt. Robert Kelly	
1927	Spoilers of the West	Lt. Lang	
1928	The Law of the Range	Jim Lockhart	
1928	Wyoming	Lt. Jack Colton	
1928	Riders of the Dark	Lt. Crane	
1928	The Adventurer	Jim McClellan	
1928	Beyond the Sierras	The Masked Stranger	
1928	The Bushranger	Edward	
1929	Morgan's Last Raid	Capt. Daniel Clairbourne	
1929	The Overland Telegraph	Capt. Allen	
1929	Sioux Blood	Flood	
1929	The Desert Rider	Jed Tyler	
1930	The Indians Are Coming	Jack Manning	12 chapter serial
1931	Heroes of the Flames	Bob Darrow	12 chapter serial
1931	The One Way Trail	Tim Allen	
1931	Shotgun Pass	Tim Walker	
1931	The Fighting Marshal	Tim Benton	
1932	The Fighting Fool	Sheriff Tim Collins	
1932	Texas Cyclone	'Texas' Grant (Jim Rawlings)	co-starred John Wayne
1932	The Riding Tornado	Tim Torrant	
1932	Two-Fisted Law	Tim Clark	co-starred John Wayne
1932	Daring Danger	Tim Madigan	
1932	Cornered	Sheriff Tim Laramie	
1932	Fighting for Justice	Tim Keene	
1932	The Western Code	Tim Barrett	
1932	End of the Trail	Captain Tim Travers	
1933	Man of Action	Tim Barlow	
1933	Silent Men	Tim Richards	
1933	The Whirlwind	Tim Reynolds	
1933	Rusty Rides Alone	Tim 'Rusty' Burke	
1933	Police Car 17	Tim Conlon	
1933	Hold the Press	Tim Collins	
1933	Straightaway	Tim Dawson	
1934	Speed Wings	Tim	
1934	Voice in the Night	Tim Dale	
1934	Hell Bent for Love	Police Captain Tim Daley	
1934	A Man's Game	Tim Bradley	
1934	Beyond the Law	Tim Weston	
1934	The Prescott Kid	Tim Hamlin	
1934	The Westerner	Tim Addison	
1935	Square Shooter	Tim Baxter	
1935	Law Beyond the Range	Tim McDonald	
1935	The Revenge Rider	Tim O'Neil	
1935	Fighting Shadows	Constable Tim O'Hara	
1935	Justice of the Range	Tim Condon	
1935	The Outlaw Deputy	Tim Mallory	
1935	Riding Wild	Tim Malloy / Tex Ravelle	
1935	The Man from Guntown	Tim Hanlon	
1935	Bulldog Courage	Slim Braddock / Tim Braddock	
1936	Roarin' Guns	Tim Corwin	
1936	Border Caballero	Tim Ross	
1936	Lightnin' Bill Carson	U. S. Marshal 'Lightnin' Bill Carson	
1936	Aces and Eights	'Gentleman' Tim Madigan	
1936	The Lion's Den	Tim Barton	
1936	Ghost Patrol	Tim Caverly	
1936	The Traitor	Sergeant Tim Vallance, Texas Rangers	
1938	West of Rainbow's End	Tim Hart	
1938	Code of the Rangers	Tim Strong	
1938	Two Gun Justice	Tim	
1938	Phantom Ranger	Tim Hayes	
1938	Lightning Carson Rides Again	'Lightning Bill' Carson, posing as Jose	as Colonel Tim McCoy
1938	Six-Gun Trail	Captain William 'Lightning Bill' Carson	
1939	Code of the Cactus	'Lightning' Bill Carson posing as Miguel	
1939	Texas Wildcats	'Lightning' Bill Carson	
1939	Outlaws' Paradise	Captain William 'Lightning Bill' Carson / Trigger Mallory	
1939	Straight Shooter	'Lightning' Bill Carson / Sam Brown	
1939	The Fighting Renegade	Lightning Bill Carson aka El Puma	
1939	Trigger Fingers	'Lightning' Bill Carson	
1940	Texas Renegades	Silent Tim Smith	
1940	Frontier Crusader	'Trigger' Tim Rand	
1940	Gun Code	Marshal Tim Hammond, alias Tim Hays	
1940	Arizona Gang Busters	'Trigger' Tim Rand	
1940	Riders of Black Mountain	Marshal Tim Donovan	
1941	Outlaws of the Rio Grande	Marshal Tim Barton	
1941	The Texas Marshal	Marshal 'Trigger Tim' Rand	
1941	Arizona Bound	Marshal Tim McCall, posing as 'Parson" McCall	
1941	The Gunman from Bodie	Marshal McCall	
1941	Forbidden Trails	Marshal Tim McCall, posing as Ace Porter	
1942	Below the Border	Marshal Tim McCall	
1942	Ghost Town Law	Marshal Tim McCall	
1942	Down Texas Way	U. S. Marshal Tim McCall	
1942	Riders of the West	Marshal Tim McCall	
1942	West of the Law	Marshal Tim McCall	
1952	The Tim McCoy Show (TV, local)	Himself	
1955	The Tim McCoy Show (TV, syndicated)	Himself	
1956	Around the World in 80 Days	Colonel, U.S. Cavalry	as Col. Tim McCoy
1957	Run of the Arrow	Gen. Allen	as Colonel Tim McCoy
1965	Requiem for a Gunfighter	Judge Irving Short	(final film role)

== DVD ==
- Col. Tim McCoy's The Silent Language of the Plains! RoundTop Records, LLC. Thermopolis, Wyoming

ISBN 978-0-9796970-1-2
