= Rex Lease =

American actor (1903–1966)

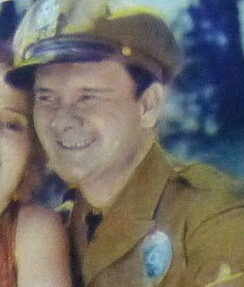
- Lease in Borrowed Wives (1930)
- Born: February 11, 1903
- Died: January 3, 1966 (aged 62); Van Nuys, California, U.S.
- Other name: Rex Lloyd Lease
- Occupation: Actor
- Years active: 1924–1960

Rex Lloyd Lease (February 11, 1903 – January 3, 1966) was an American actor. He appeared in over 300 films, mainly in Poverty Row Westerns.

== Biography ==
Rex Lease arrived in Hollywood in 1924. He found bit and supporting parts at Film Booking Office (FBO), Rayart, and more, and was given the opportunity to play a few leads. His first film was A Woman Who Sinned (FBO, 1924).

Lease's earliest Westerns were a pair of Tim McCoy silents at MGM, one of which was The Law of the Range (MGM, 1928) which had a young Joan Crawford as the heroine and Lease as the Solitaire Kid. McCoy and Lease became friends, and over the next dozen or so years, he appeared in seven more McCoy Westerns.

He had a featured role in director Frank Capra's The Younger Generation (Columbia, 1929), a tale of a Jewish family that moves to a more up-scale neighborhood.

He successfully made the transition to talkies, and starred in melodramas, action flicks, old dark house mysteries, and comedies, as well as a couple of Western serials and about a dozen low-budget sagebrush yarns and outdoor adventures. His work in the 1930s included six Western films for Superior Talking Pictures Corporation. Some featured cowboy music, and some had him paired with young actor Bobby Nelson.

In between lead roles, Lease featured parts in some B Westerns. He was Hoot Gibson's brother in Cavalcade of the West (Walter Futter Prod., 1936); Lease played the "Pecos Kid" in McCoy's Lightnin' Bill Carson (Puritan, 1936); played Col. William B. Travis in Heroes of the Alamo and he worked in a couple of Tom Tyler's, Ridin' On (Reliable, 1936) and Fast Bullets (Reliable, 1936). Lease had the lead in the 1936 film serial Custer's Last Stand (1936).

Lease's finale as a star had him teaming up with Rin-Tin-Tin Jr. in The Silver Trail (Reliable, 1937).

Though no longer afforded star billing, he continued in smaller roles into the 1950s in films (recurring as the sheriff in four Ma and Pa Kettle movies) and on TV.

== Personal life ==
In 1930, Lease pleaded guilty in a Malibu court to a charge of battery on actress and dancer Vivian Duncan. The charge resulted from his beating of Duncan at a home in Malibu Beach on July 7, 1930. He paid a $50 fine, insisting that she initiated the altercation. Duncan's brother, Harold, retaliated in August 1930, beating Lease in a hotel cafe in Hollywood.

Lease was married at least five times.

== Death ==
On January 3, 1966, Lease was found dead by his son, Richard, on the kitchen floor at his Van Nuys, California home. He had died sometime between New Year's Eve and January 3. The cause of death was undisclosed. Richard was later shot and killed at age 25 in a road rage traffic altercation with two teenagers.

== Selected filmography ==
- A Woman Who Sinned (1924) - Her Son - as an adult
- Chalk Marks (1924) - Bert Thompson
- Easy Money (1925) - 'Red'
- Before Midnight (1925) - Julio Saldivar
- The Last Edition (1925) - Clarence Walker
- Somebody's Mother (1926) - Peter
- Mystery Pilot (1926) - Bob Jones
- The Last Alarm (1926) - Tom
- Race Wild (1926)
- The Timid Terror (1926) - Howard Cramm
- Heroes of the Night (1927) - Tom Riley
- Enemies of Society (1927) - Jim Barry
- The Outlaw Dog (1927) - Bill Brady
- Not for Publication (1927) - Philip Hale
- The Cancelled Debt (1927) - Patrick Burke
- Clancy's Kosher Wedding (1927) - Tom Clancy
- The College Hero (1927) - Jim Halloran
- The Law of the Range (1928) - Solitaire Kid
- Queen of the Chorus (1928) - Billy Cooke
- Broadway Daddies (1928) - Richard Kennedy
- The Phantom of the Turf (1928) - John Nichols
- Red Riders of Canada (1928) - Pierre Duval
- Riders of the Dark (1928) - Jim Graham
- The Last Lap (1928)
- Making the Varsity (1928) - Ed Ellsworth
- The Speed Classic (1928) - Jerry Thornton
- Stolen Love (1928) - Bill
- The Candy Kid (1928)
- When Dreams Come True (1929) - Ben Shelby
- The Younger Generation (1929)
- Two Sisters (1929)
- Troopers Three (1930)
- Sunny Skies (1930)
- Hot Curves (1930)
- Borrowed Wives (1930)
- Wings of Adventure (1930)
- The Utah Kid (1930)
- Chinatown After Dark (1931)
- In Old Cheyenne (1931)
- The Sign of the Wolf (1931) 10-chapter serial
- Is There Justice? (1931)
- Cannonball Express (1932)
- The Monster Walks (1932)
- Midnight Morals (1932)
- The Lone Trail (1932)
- Rough Riding Ranger (1935)
- Fighting Caballero (1935)
- The Ghost Rider (1935)
- The Cowboy and the Bandit (1935)
- Pals of the Range (1935)
- The Man from Guntown (1935)
- Cyclone of the Saddle (1935)
- Custer's Last Stand (1936)
- Ten Laps to Go (1936)
- Aces and Eights (1936)
- Lightnin' Bill Carson (1936)
- Ridin' On (1936)
- The Silver Trail (1937)
- Heroes of the Alamo (1937)
- The Lone Ranger Rides Again (1939)
- Under Texas Skies (1940)
- The Trail Blazers (1940)
- Lone Star Raiders (1940)
- A Chump at Oxford (1940)
- Billy the Kid's Gun Justice (1940)
- Outlaws of Cherokee Trail (1941)
- Tonto Basin Outlaws (1941)
- Billy the Kid's Range War (1941)
- Billy the Kid in Santa Fe (1941)
- In Old California (1942)
- Saboteur (1942) - Plant Cafeteria Worker (uncredited)
- Haunted Ranch (1943)
- Flame of Barbary Coast (1945)
- Dakota (1945)
- Curtain Call at Cactus Creek (1950)
- Lost in Alaska (1952)
- Jefferson Drum NBC-TV, as Tobin in episode "The Cheater" (1958)
