= Daddy's Gone A-Hunting =

Daddy's Gone A-Hunting may refer to:

- Daddy's Gone A-Hunting (1925 film), an American silent drama film
- Daddy's Gone A-Hunting (1969 film), an American thriller film
