= Frank Hagney =

Australian actor (1884–1973)

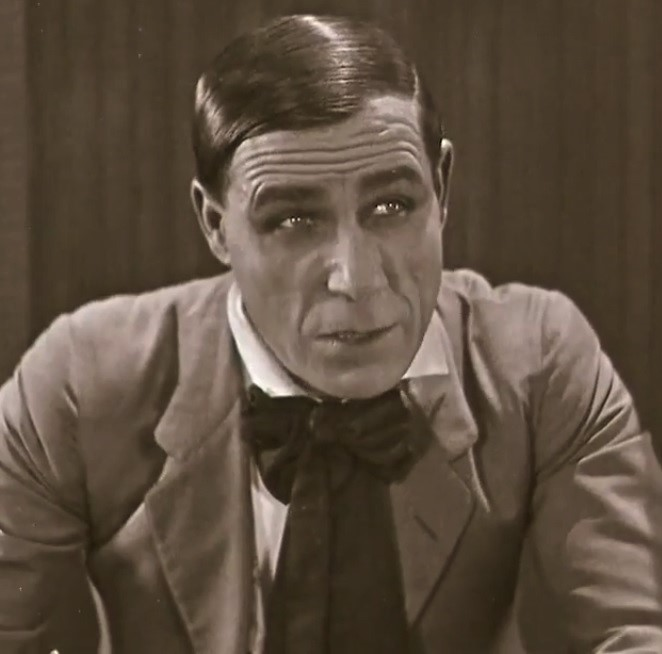
- Hagney in The General (1926)
- Born: Frank Sidney Hagney; 20 March 1884; Sydney, New South Wales, Australia
- Died: 25 June 1973 (aged 89); Los Angeles, California, U.S.
- Resting place: Forest Lawn Memorial Park, Glendale, California
- Occupation: Actor
- Years active: 1919–1966
- Spouse: Edna Shephard

Frank Sidney Hagney (20 March 1884 – 25 June 1973) was an Australian actor. He appeared in over 350 Hollywood movies from 1919 to 1956. Before becoming an actor he successfully and professionally competed in several sports like cycling, boxing and rowing.

== Early life ==
Born in Sydney, New South Wales in 1884. Still in Australia, Hagney competed professionally in cycling from 1905 to 1910, after which he successfully switched to heavyweight boxing from 1914 to 1918.

== Career ==
Hagney appeared in more than 350 Hollywood films between 1919 and 1966. Most of his film roles were small and uncredited. Hagney often played officers or henchmen. He is perhaps best-known as Mr. Potter's silent, wheelchair-pushing valet in Frank Capra's classic It's a Wonderful Life (1946). Hagney was also a guest star on more than 70 television programs such as The Cisco Kid, The Adventures of Kit Carson, The Lone Ranger, The Rifleman, Perry Mason, and Daniel Boone. In 1956 he appeared as a Townsman in an uncredited role in the TV western Cheyenne in the episode titled "The Last Train West."

He starred in The Fighting Marine (1926) with Jack Anthony, Joe Bonomo and Walter Miller; The Fighting Sap (1924) with Bob Fleming, Hazel Keener, Wilfred Lucas and Fred Thomson; The Ghost in the Garret (1921), Ghost Town Gold (1936), Go Get 'Em Hutch (1922) with Richard R. Neil; Ride Him Cowboy (1932) with Eddie Gribbon and John Wayne, Valley of the Lawless (1936), and Vultures of the Sea (1928) with Joseph Bennett.

His 42 silent films included The Battler (1919), The Breed of the Border (1924), The Dangerous Coward (1924), Galloping Gallagher (1924), Lighting Romance (1924), The Mask of Lopez (1924), The Silent Stranger (1924), The Wild Bull's Lair (1925), Lone Hand Saunders (1926) and The Two-Gun Man (1926). His 54 sound western film included The Phantom of the West (1931), Fighting Caravans (1931), The Squaw Man (1931), The Golden West (1932), Honor of the Range (1934), Western Frontier, Heroes of the Range (1936), Billy the Kid, The Lone Rider Rides On (1941), Blazing Frontier (1943) and The Wistful Widow of Wagon Gap (1947). His last two films were McLintock! (1963) and Come Blow Your Horn (1963).

== Personal life ==
Hagney was married to Edna Shephard.

He was also a professional sculler. In 1927 he won a race between Long Beach, California and Santa Catalina Island, which was captured on film.

== Death ==
Hagney died in Los Angeles in 1973. He is buried at Forest Lawn Memorial Park, Glendale.

== Filmography ==
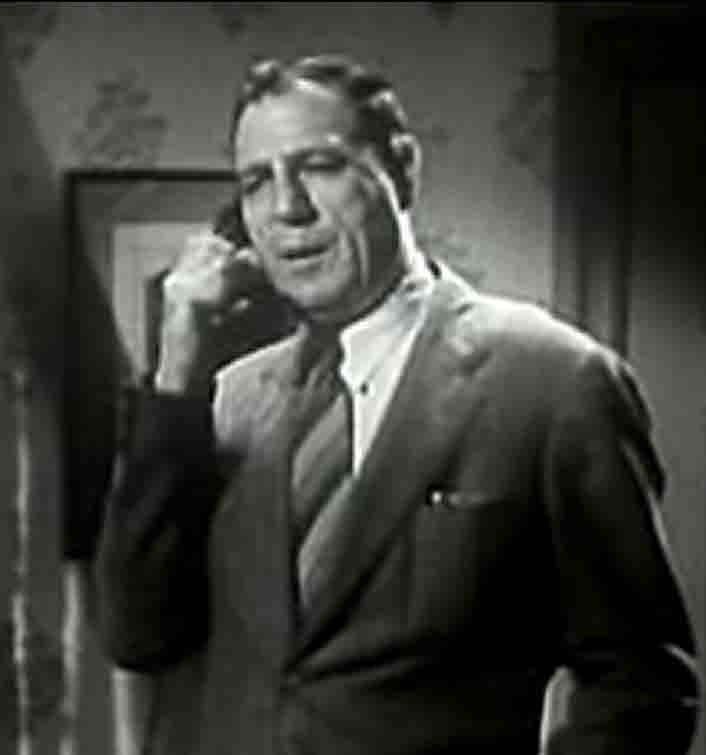
Frank Hagney (1940), in Misbehaving Husbands

- The Battler (1919) – 'Spike' Kelly
- The Whirlwind (1920)
- The Gauntlet (1920) – Buck Higby
- The Ghost in the Garret (1921) – Crook
- Anne of Little Smoky (1921) – Ed Brockton
- Go Get 'Em Hutch (1921)
- Outcast (1922)
- Backbone (1923) – The Indian
- Galloping Gallagher (1924) – Joseph Burke
- The Mask of Lopez (1924)- Steve Gore / Lopez
- The Martyr Sex (1924) – Ed Carter
- The Silent Stranger (1924) – Dick Blackwell
- The Dangerous Coward (1924) – Wildcat Rex
- Fight and Win (1924) – Spike McGann – Prizefighting Opponent
- The Fighting Sap (1924) – Nebraska Brent
- Poison (1924) – Joe Tracey
- Hit and Run (1924) – Tough Guy
- Roaring Rails (1924) – Red Burley
- Lightning Romance (1924) – Arizona Joe
- The Lighthouse by the Sea (1924) – Chief Henchman
- Breed of the Border (1924) – Sheriff Wells
- Fighting Youth (1925) – 'Murdering' Mooney
- The Wild Bull's Lair (1925) – Eagle Eye
- Wild Justice (1925) – Bob Blake, the Villain
- The New Champion (1925) – 'Knockout' Riley
- Big Pal (1925) – Bill Hogan
- Hogan's Alley (1925) – The Battling Savage
- Braveheart (1925) – Ki-Yote
- The Sea Beast (1926) – Daggoo
- The Two-Gun Man (1926) – Bowie Bill
- The Fighting Marine (1926)
- Lone Hand Saunders (1926) – Buck
- The Ice Flood (1926) – Pete the Bully
- The Winning Wallop (1926) – 'Pug' Brennan
- Fangs of Justice (1926) – Walter Page
- The General (1926) – Confederate Recruiter
- The Last Trail (1927) – Henchman Cal Barker
- All Aboard (1927) – Ali Ben Ome
- The Frontiersman (1927) – White Snake
- One-Round Hogan (1927) – 'Big Joe' Morgan
- On Your Toes (1927) – Mello
- Her Wild Oat (1927) – Workman
- The Rawhide Kid (1928) – J. Francis Jackson
- Burning Daylight (1928) – Johnson
- Midnight Madness (1928) – Harris – Childers' Henchman
- The Charge of the Gauchos (1928) – Goyenecha
- Free Lips (1928) – Bill Dugan
- Vultures of the Sea (1928) – Bull Marlow
- Show Girl (1928) – Private Detective
- Power (1928) – Job Foreman
- Through the Breakers (1928) – Gamboa
- The Glorious Trail (1928) – Gus Lynch
- Broken Barriers (1928) – James Barker
- Captain Lash (1929) – Bull Hawks
- Masked Emotions (1929) – Lagune
- Oh, Yeah! (1929) – Hot Foot
- Her Man (1930) – Henchman Hank
- Billy the Kid (1930) – Bert Grant
- River's End (1930) – Mountie
- The Phantom of the West (1931) – Sheriff Jim H. Ryan
- The Criminal Code (1931) – Prison Guard in Yard
- No Limit (1931) – Battling Hannon
- Fighting Caravans (1931) – Renegade
- Sit Tight (1931) – Olaf
- Hell Bound (1931) – Hood
- The Squaw Man (1931) – Deputy Clark
- I Like Your Nerve (1931) – Rocci – Assassin
- Reckless Living (1931) – Henchman
- The Champ (1931) – Manuel Quiroga – Mexican Champ
- A House Divided (1931) – Big Bill
- The Airmail Mystery (1932) – Moran
- The Rider of Death Valley (1932) – Gambler
- Tom Brown of Culver (1932) – Fight Manager
- Ride Him, Cowboy (1932) – Henry Sims – aka The Hawk
- Pack Up Your Troubles (1932) – Doughboy
- The All American (1932) – Hop McComb
- The Golden West (1932) – Chief Grey Eagle
- If I Had a Million (1932) – Mike – Carnival Bouncer
- You Said a Mouthful (1932) – Holt's Manager
- Fast Life (1932) – Henchman
- Face in the Sky (1933) – Minor Role
- Parachute Jumper (1933) – Marine
- Terror Aboard (1933) – First Mate
- Song of the Eagle (1933) – Flynn, a Henchman
- Hold Your Man (1933) – Policeman Arresting Ruby
- I Love That Man (1933) – Frank – Label's Henchman
- Tillie and Gus (1933) – Jury Foreman
- The Chief (1933) – Fireman
- Sitting Pretty (1933) – Bar Bouncer
- Dancing Lady (1933) – Policeman
- Roman Scandals (1933) – Lucius – Josephus' Charioteer
- The Meanest Gal in Town (1934) – Angry Truck Driver
- The House of Rothschild (1934) – Man in 1780 Sequence
- Honor of the Range (1934) – Boots
- All Men Are Enemies (1934) – Australian Drunk
- Green Eyes (1934) – Motorcycle Policeman
- The Red Rider (1934, Serial) – Barfly (Ch. 1)
- I Give My Love (1934) – Burly Soldier
- Treasure Island (1934) – Pirate
- 6 Day Bike Rider (1934) – Referee
- The Mighty Barnum (1934) – Teamster
- The Best Man Wins (1935) – Bouncer
- Naughty Marietta (1935) – Mercenary Scout
- Les Misérables (1935) – Galley Prisoner
- The Informer (1935) – Policeman
- The Daring Young Man (1935) – Convict
- Western Frontier (1935) – Link
- Diamond Jim (1935) – Mug
- Thunderbolt (1935) – Deputy Blackie
- The Adventures of Frank Merriwell (1936, Serial) – Slout
- Valley of the Lawless (1936) – Garlow
- Modern Times (1936) – Shipbuilder
- Here Comes Trouble (1936) – Ox
- Robin Hood of El Dorado (1936) – Deputy Phil
- Heroes of the Range (1936) – Lightning Smith
- Gun Grit (1936) – Henry Hess
- Parole! (1936) – Truck Driver
- Wildcat Trooper (1936) – Jim Foster
- Kelly the Second (1936) – Louie
- Wild Horse Round-Up (1936) – Steve
- The Black Coin (1936, Serial) – Purcell – Henchman [Chs. 11–14]
- The Big Broadcast of 1937 (1936) – Cowboy
- The Magnificent Brute (1936) – Worker
- Ghost-Town Gold (1936) – Wild Man Kamatski
- Wild Horse Round-Up (1936) – Henchman Steve Clark
- Conflict (1936) – Mike Malone
- The Plough and the Stars (1936)
- A Man Betrayed (1936) – Roundhouse
- Secret Valley (1937) – Brodie – Henchman
- Woman-Wise (1937) – Fighter
- You Only Live Once (1937) – Plainclothesman
- Park Avenue Logger (1937) – Logger
- Night Key (1937) – Henchman
- The Prince and the Pauper (1937) – Beggar
- Behind the Headlines (1937) – Gang Member
- Hollywood Cowboy (1937) – Gillie – Henchman
- Riders of the Dawn (1937) – Henchman Butch
- Windjammer (1937) – Slum
- Big City (1937) – Comet Cab Driver
- Madame X (1937) – Jailer
- Saturday's Heroes (1937) – Trainer Giving Rubdown
- Clipped Wings (1937) – Terrell
- Sh! The Octopus (1937) – Sinister Plotter
- Wise Girl (1937) – Mike's Fight Opponent
- The Bad Man of Brimstone (1937) – Horntoad
- Walking Down Broadway (1938) – Baggage Man
- The Secret of Treasure Island (1938, Serial) – Ambulance Driver
- The Adventures of Robin Hood (1938) – Man-at-Arms
- Professor Beware (1938) – Sailor
- Army Girl (1938) – Soldier
- Dick Tracy Returns (1938, Serial) – Silm
- Mysterious Mr. Moto (1938) – Bouncer at Purple Peter
- Stablemates (1938) – Poolroom Owner
- The Spider's Web (1938, Serial) – Henchman
- The Storm (1938) – Brawler
- Angels with Dirty Faces (1938) – Sharpie
- Up the River (1938) – Guard
- Devil's Island (1939) – Guard
- Flying G-Men (1939, Serial) – Henchman
- Pardon Our Nerve (1939) – Gunboat Briggs
- Mandrake the Magician (1939, Serial) – Harris
- The Kid from Kokomo (1939) – Old Man in Fistfight
- Unmarried (1939) – Second Referee
- Captain Fury (1939) – Guard #3
- It Could Happen to You (1939) – Burglar
- Timber Stampede (1939) – Champ – Henchman
- Tower of London (1939) – Soldier
- The Shadow (1940, Serial) – Cranston's Kidnapper
- The Invisible Man Returns (1940) – Bill
- The Man from Dakota (1940) – Wagon Guard
- Northwest Passage (1940) – Capt. Grant
- Midnight Limited (1940) – Detective Joe O'Neill
- Son of the Navy (1940) – Vegetable Truck Driver
- Dark Command (1940) – Tough Yankee #2
- Boom Town (1940) – Man Abandoned by Whitey
- Rangers of Fortune (1940) – Townsman
- Tugboat Annie Sails Again (1940) – Stranded Ship's Engineer
- Seven Sinners (1940) – 'Junior' – Antros Henchman
- Melody Ranch (1940) – Man Who Asks for Quiet
- Gallant Sons (1940) – Card Player Who Doesn't Know French
- South of Suez (1940) – Miner
- Misbehaving Husbands (1940) – Gooch Mulligan
- The Green Hornet Strikes Again! (1940, Serial) – Warehouse Truck Loader
- The Lone Rider Rides On (1941) – Frank Mitchell
- The Lone Rider Crosses the Rio (1941) – Henchman Marty
- Mr. District Attorney (1941) – Henchman
- Federal Fugitives (1941) – Henchman Butch
- The Lone Rider in Ghost Town (1941) – O'Shea
- Billy the Kid (1941) – Man in Saloon
- The Get-Away (1941) – Prison Guard Bringing Crane to Warden
- Law of the Range (1941) – Deputy
- Desperate Cargo (1941) – Butch, the Bouncher
- Dr. Jekyll and Mr. Hyde (1941) – Drunk
- The Lone Rider Ambushed (1941) – Blackie Dawson
- The Smiling Ghost (1941) – Ryan
- Unexpected Uncle (1941) – Truck Driver
- Man at Large (1941) – Dancehall Patron with Picture
- Mr. Celebrity (1941) – Patrick J. Dugan – Private Detective
- The Lone Rider Fights Back (1941) – George Clarke
- The Corsican Brothers (1941) – Torture Cell Guard
- Swamp Woman (1941) – Guard
- Among the Living (1941) – Neighbor
- Texas Man Hunt (1942) – Walter Jensen
- Broadway Big Shot (1942) – Butch
- Captain Midnight (1942, Serial) – Henchman
- Too Many Women (1942) – Laborer
- Reap the Wild Wind (1942) – Cutler Man in Barrell Room
- True to the Army (1942) – Torchy
- House of Errors (1942) – Black
- Juke Box Jenny (1942) – Cabbie
- This Time for Keeps (1942) – Electrical Lineman
- Sunday Punch (1942) – Dennis Riley – First Referee
- My Favorite Spy (1942) – Kelly's Patron
- In Old California (1942) – Angry Citizen in Lynch Mob
- Men of Texas (1942) – Road Agent
- Tumbleweed Trail (1942) – Sheriff
- Timber (1942) – Lumberjack
- Boss of Hangtown Mesa (1942) – Town Tough
- The Glass Key (1942) – Strongarm Thug Escorting Sloss
- Tomorrow We Live (1942) – Kohler
- Sin Town (1942) – Bartender
- Gentleman Jim (1942) – Mug
- The McGuerins from Brooklyn (1942) – Savoy Hotel Doorman
- Tennessee Johnson (1942) – Heckler
- Stand by for Action (1942) – Sailor
- Corregidor (1943) – Lieutenant #2
- Don Winslow of the Coast Guard (1943, Serial) – Henchman Muller [Ch. 13]
- She Has What It Takes (1943) – Trainer
- Calling Wild Bill Elliott (1943) – Henchman
- Hitler's Madman (1943) – Engineer
- Two Tickets to London (1943) – Second Mate
- The Man from Down Under (1943) – Military Policeman
- The Renegade (1943) – Henchman Saunders
- Blazing Frontier (1943) – Sheriff Ward Tragg
- Crazy House (1943) – Studio Cop
- Swing Fever (1943) – Bag Puncher
- The Lodger (1944) – Policeman
- Shine On, Harvest Moon (1944) – Bouncer
- The Adventures of Mark Twain (1944) – Crew Chief
- Once Upon a Time (1944) – Assistant Cyclist
- Detective Kitty O'Day (1944) – Spike
- Meet the People (1944) – Shipyard Gateman
- Louisiana Hayride (1944) – Bartender in Film
- The Seventh Cross (1944) – Man on Street
- Frenchman's Creek (1944) – Cornishman
- Lost in a Harem (1944) – Majordomo
- Music for Millions (1944) – Policeman
- Destiny (1944) – Third Motorcycle Cop
- Can't Help Singing (1944) – Gunman
- The Man in Half Moon Street (1945) – Bobby
- The Big Show-Off (1945) – Rude Night Club Patron
- Bring on the Girls (1945) – Flunky
- The Power of the Whistler (1945) – Man Delivering Cake
- It's in the Bag (1945) – Nightclub Tough in Fight
- Flame of Barbary Coast (1945) – Morell Henchman
- Along Came Jones (1945) – Townsman
- Scotland Yard Investigator (1945) – Constable
- Abbott and Costello in Hollywood (1945) – Cop
- Senorita from the West (1945) – Moving Man
- Kitty (1945) – Stevedore
- Confidential Agent (1945) – Miner
- Saratoga Trunk (1945) – Soule Gang Leader
- Adventure (1945) – Boss
- Girl on the Spot (1946) – Mug
- The Kid from Brooklyn (1946) – Arena Usher
- Two Sisters from Boston (1946) – Stagehand
- Night in Paradise (1946) – Townsperson
- Easy to Wed (1946) – Truck Driver
- The Verdict (1946) – Ex-Pugilist Juryman
- It's a Wonderful Life (1946) – Potter's Bodyguard
- California (1947) – Stranger
- The Sea of Grass (1947) – Poker Game Spectator
- The Imperfect Lady (1947) – Man With Travers
- Too Many Winners (1947) – Joe
- Unconquered (1947) – Jake – Bartender
- Wild Harvest (1947) – Alperson Crew Member
- The Wistful Widow of Wagon Gap (1947) – Barfly
- Road to Rio (1947) – Roustabout
- The Big Clock (1948) – Ice Man
- River Lady (1948) – Sands
- Feudin', Fussin' and A-Fightin' (1948) – Townsman
- Superman (1948, Serial) – Car 1 Henchman
- The Babe Ruth Story (1948) – Doorman
- A Southern Yankee (1948) – Horseman
- Night Has a Thousand Eyes (1948) – Truckman
- Johnny Belinda (1948) – Man Reciting Lord's Prayer
- Harpoon (1948) – Big Red Dorsett
- An Innocent Affair (1948) – Mover
- The Three Musketeers (1948) – Executioner of Lyons
- The Untamed Breed (1948) – Rancher
- Kiss the Blood Off My Hands (1948) – Seaman
- Thunder in the Pines (1948) – Lumberjack in Saloon
- Joan of Arc (1948) – Soldier #3
- Whispering Smith (1948) – Frank – Wrecking Crew Member
- The Paleface (1948) – Greg
- I Shot Jesse James (1949) – Livery Stableman
- Knock on Any Door (1949) – Suspect
- The Fighting O'Flynn (1949) – Soldier
- Fighting Fools (1949) – Tough Customer Tearing Up Program
- Tulsa (1949) – Doorman at Gambling Emporium
- Streets of Laredo (1949) – Texas Ranger
- Grand Canyon (1949) – Henchman #2
- Batman and Robin (1949, Serial) – Plant Guard [Ch. 14]
- The Beautiful Blonde from Bashful Bend (1949) – Hoodlum
- The Big Steal (1949) – Madden the Guard
- Reign of Terror (1949) – Bakery Guard
- All the King's Men (1949) – Stark Strong-Arm Man
- On the Town (1949) – Policeman
- Samson and Delilah (1949) – Gristmill Guard
- The Yellow Cab Man (1950) – Truck Driver
- Appointment with Danger (1950) – Motorcycle Cop
- Kill the Umpire (1950) – Guard
- Lucky Losers (1950) – Joe
- Fortunes of Captain Blood (1950) – Guard
- Atom Man vs. Superman (1950, Serial) – Impatient Man at Bridge [Ch. 1]
- Triple Trouble (1950) – Convict
- Silver Raiders (1950) – Steve – Mine Guard
- South Sea Sinner (1950) – Minor Role
- Let's Dance (1950) – Police Sergeant
- Copper Canyon (1950) – Travis Man
- Blues Busters (1950) – Joe, the Bouncer
- Stage to Tucson (1950) – Territorial Townsman
- Soldiers Three (1951) – Scot
- Santa Fe (1951) – Railroad Worker
- The Scarf (1951) – Floozy's Boyfriend
- The Lady and the Bandit (1951) – Turpin's Hangman
- Here Comes the Groom (1951) – Passenger on Airplane
- Anne of the Indies (1951) – Pirate on Molly O'Brien
- The Son of Dr. Jekyll (1951) – Man in Bar
- Man in the Saddle (1951) – Ned Bale
- Captain Video: Master of the Stratosphere (1951, Serial) – Henchman [Ch. 14]
- My Favorite Spy (1951) – Camel-Herder
- Scandal Sheet (1952) – Onlooker at Murder Scene
- The Big Trees (1952) – Glen – Lumberman with Rifle
- The Pace That Thrills (1952) – Race Flagman
- Aaron Slick from Punkin Crick (1952) – Oil Driller
- The San Francisco Story (1952) – Palmer
- Cripple Creek (1952) – Gold Smelter
- The Duel at Silver Creek (1952) – Will
- Limelight (1952) – Extra in Dress Circle
- Hangman's Knot (1952) – Drifter
- Hans Christian Andersen (1952) – Townsman
- Botany Bay (1952) – Guard
- Kansas Pacific (1953) – Workman
- A Perilous Journey (1953) – Miner
- Hannah Lee (1953) – Fred
- The Last Posse (1953) – Posse Rider Cord
- Ride, Vaquero! (1953) – Bartender
- The Stranger Wore a Gun (1953) – Deputy Sheriff
- The Wild One (1953) – Official
- Ride Clear of Diablo (1954) – Miner
- Riot in Cell Block 11 (1954) – Convict Roberts
- Rose Marie (1954) – Woodsman in Saloon
- Demetrius and the Gladiators (1954) – Guard
- King Richard and the Crusaders (1954) – Mobster
- Three Hours to Kill (1954) – Cass
- The Human Jungle (1954) – Minor Role
- The Silver Chalice (1954) – Ruffian
- Abbott and Costello Meet the Keystone Kops (1955) – Usher / Ticket Taker
- Timberjack (1955) – Barfly
- Stranger on Horseback (1955) – Bartender
- Wyoming Renegades (1955) – Jones
- A Bullet for Joey (1955) – Nightclub Bartender
- Wichita (1955) – Barfly / Lookout
- Jail Busters (1955) – Frank – Barber
- A Man Alone (1955) – Dorfman
- Lucy Gallant (1955) – Townsman
- Teen-Age Crime Wave (1955) – Juvenile Court Bailiff
- The Spoilers (1955) – Sourdough at Hearing
- A Lawless Street (1955) – Dingo Brion
- Invasion of the Body Snatchers (1956) – Townsman
- Fury at Gunsight Pass (1956) – Townsman
- Crashing Las Vegas (1956) – Guard
- The Harder They Fall (1956) – Referee
- The Rawhide Years (1956) – Riverboat Passenger
- Gun Brothers (1956) – Trapper
- Showdown at Abilene (1956) – Roughneck
- The Ten Commandments (1956) – Hebrew at Golden Calf
- Friendly Persuasion (1956) – Lemonade Vendor
- The Desperados Are in Town (1956) – Bartender / Bouncer
- Zombies of Mora Tau (1957) – Capt. Peters
- The Phantom Stagecoach (1957) – Rider
- The Guns of Fort Petticoat (1957) – Blacksmith
- The Kettles on Old MacDonald's Farm (1957) – Townsman
- Public Pigeon No. 1 (1957) – Convict
- Gunfight at the O.K. Corral (1957) – Bartender
- 3:10 to Yuma (1957) – Townsman in Contention
- Baby Face Nelson (1957) – Plant Guard
- The Hard Man (1957) – Posse Man
- Return to Warbow (1958) – Convict
- Hell's Five Hours (1958) – Guard
- The Buccaneer (1958) – Baratarian Pirate
- The Hanging Tree (1959) – Townsman
- Last Train from Gun Hill (1959) – Craig's Man Waiting in Horseshoe
- The Jayhawkers! (1959) – Jayhawker
- Ride the High Country (1962) – Miner
- Come Blow Your Horn (1963) – Bit Role
- Donovan's Reef (1963) – Chief Petty Officer
- McLintock! (1963) – Elmer – Bartender
- Apache Rifles (1964) – Townsman
- The Rare Breed (1966) – Cattle Buyer
- The Silencers (1966) – Drunk
- The Fastest Guitar Alive (1967) – Drunk

== Bibliography ==
- Katchmer, George A. (22 September 2009). A Biographical Dictionary of Silent Film Western Actors and Actresses. McFarland Publishing. p. 488. ISBN 9781476609058.
