= The Fighting Marine =

1926 film

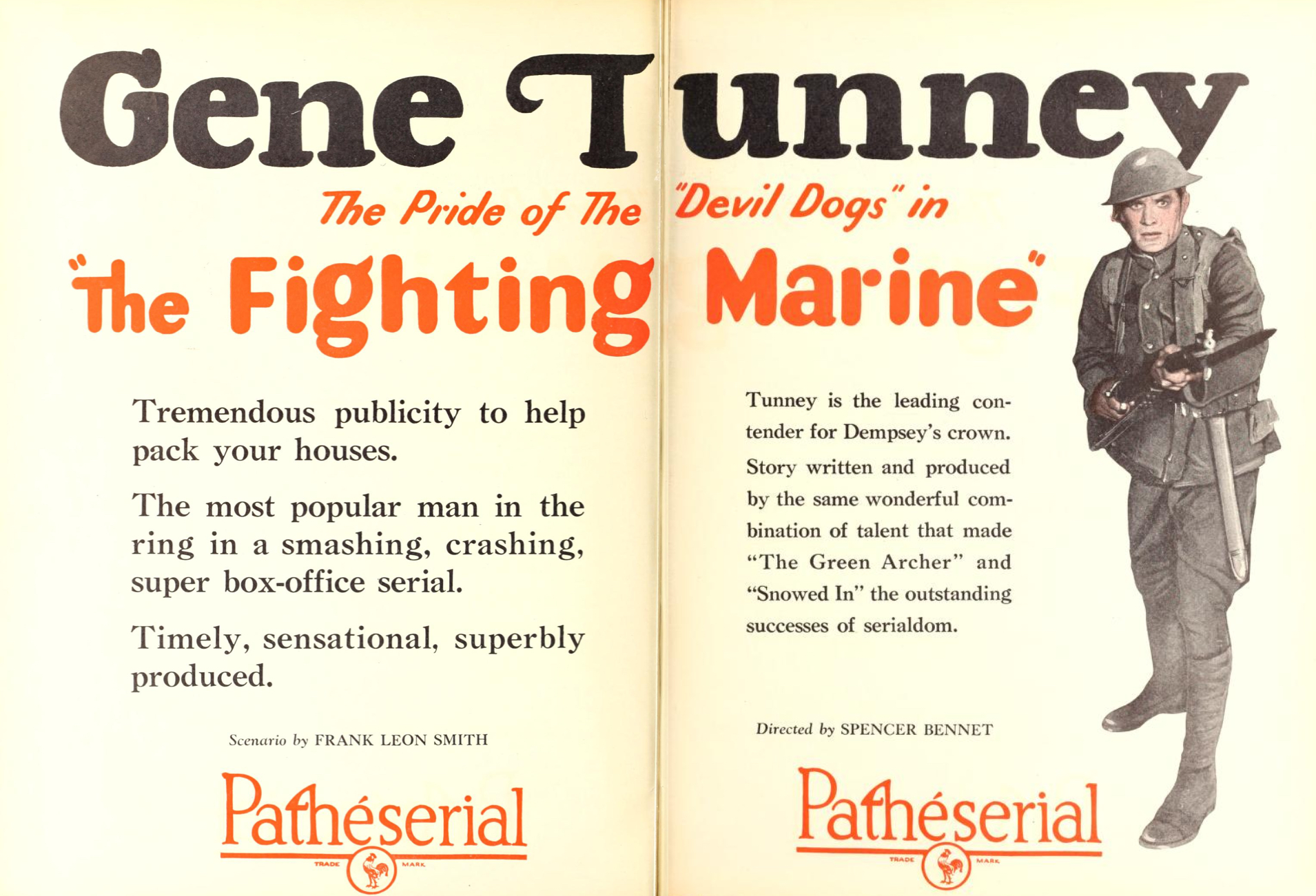
- Directed by: Spencer Gordon Bennet
- Written by: Frank Leon Smith
- Starring: Gene Tunney; Marjorie Day
- Distributed by: Pathé Exchange
- Release date: September 12, 1926
- Running time: 10 episodes
- Country: United States
- Language: Silent (English intertitles)

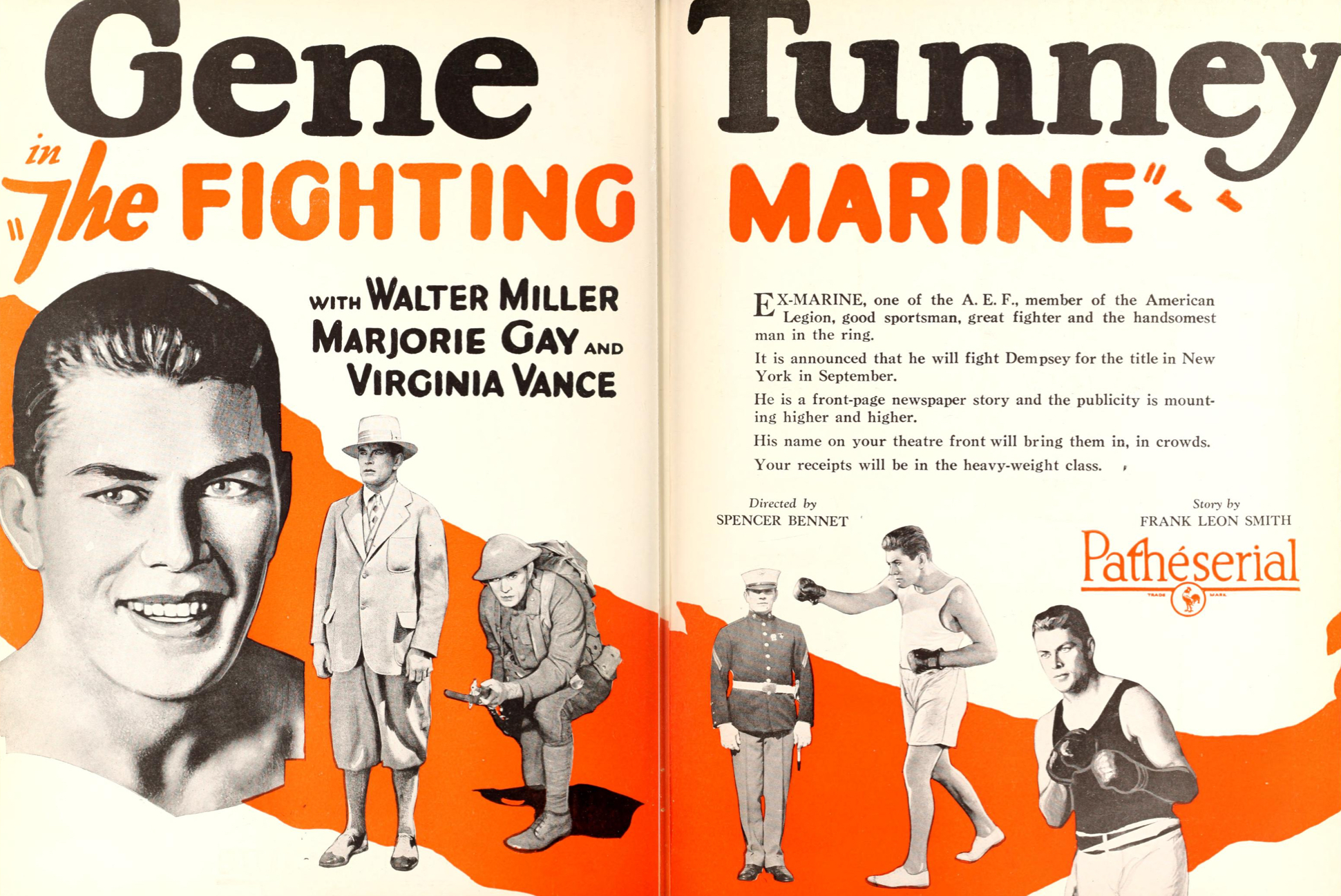
The Fighting Marine (Gene Tunney) ad in Motion Picture News, 1926

The Fighting Marine is a 1926 American drama film serial directed by Spencer Gordon Bennet, and featured the only screen performance by the boxing heavyweight champion, Gene Tunney.

== Cast ==
- Gene Tunney as Dick Farrington
- Marjorie Day as Lady Chatfield
- Walter Miller as Larry Stuart
- Virginia Vance as Ruby
- Sherman Ross as Charles Vellard
- Anna Mae Walthall as Mazzie
- Wally Oettel as Roger Poole
- Jack Anthony as Matt
- Mike Donlin
- David Dunbar
- Joseph North (as Joe North)
- W.J. Allen
- Ben Walker
- Bert Gardner
- Frank Hagney

== Preservation ==
The Fighting Marine is now considered to be a lost film.

== Chapter titles ==
1. The Successful Candidate
2. The Second Attack
3. In the Enemy's Trap
4. The Desperate Foe
5. Entombed
6. The Falling Tower
7. Waylaid
8. Challenged
9. The Signal Shot
10. Fired and Hired

== See also ==
- List of film serials
- List of film serials by studio
- List of lost films
