= Galloping Gallagher =

1924 film directed by Albert S. Rogell

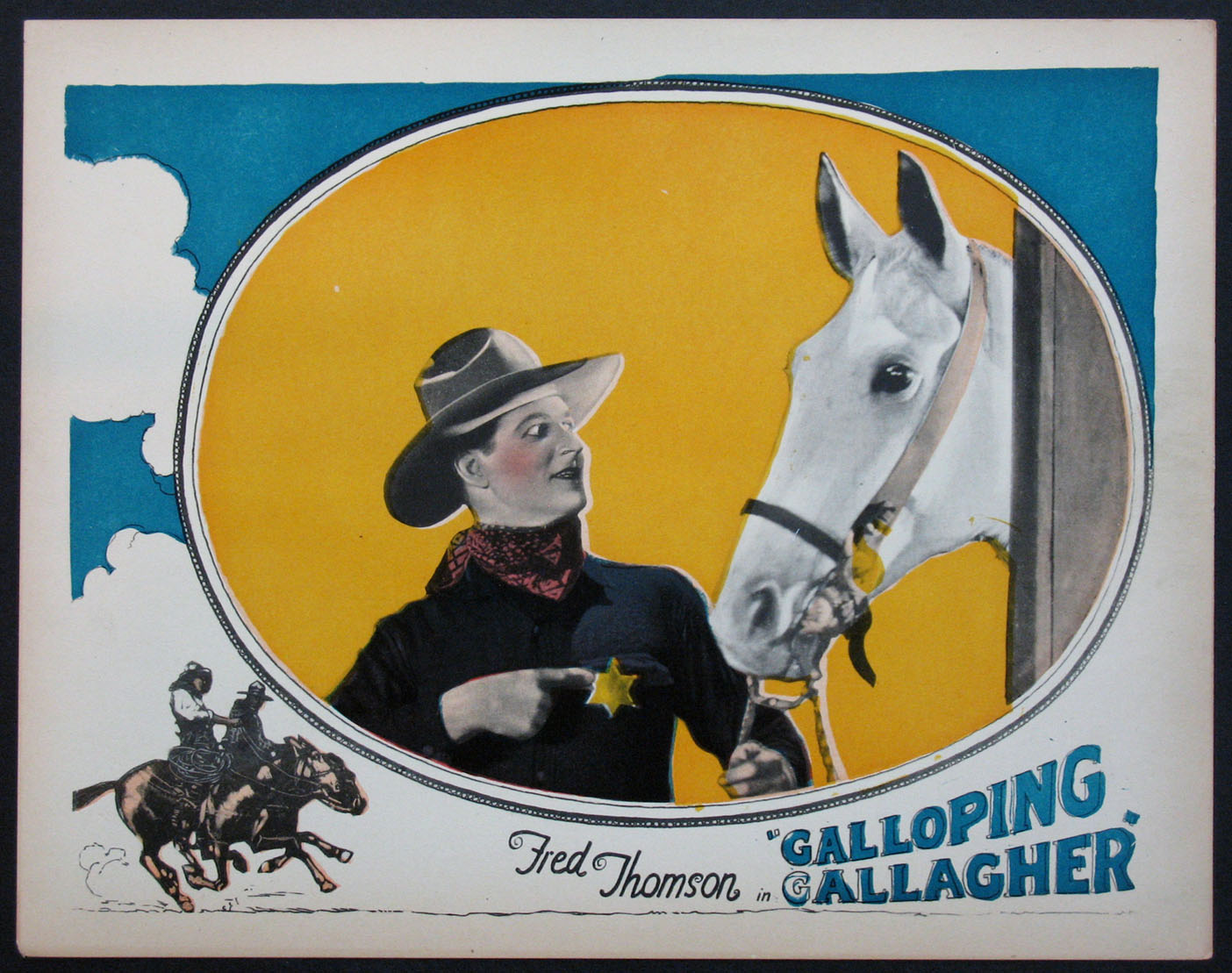
- Lobby card
- Directed by: Albert S. Rogell
- Written by: Marion Jackson
- Produced by: Harry Joe Brown
- Starring: Fred Thomson; Hazel Keener; Frank Hagney
- Production company: Monogram Pictures
- Distributed by: Film Booking Offices of America
- Release date: March 1, 1924
- Running time: 5 reels
- Country: United States
- Language: Silent (English intertitles)

Galloping Gallagher is a 1924 American silent Western film directed by Albert S. Rogell and starring Fred Thomson, Hazel Keener, and Frank Hagney. The film was originally five reels long, only 29 minutes of which survive today.

== Plot ==
As described in a film magazine review, with the help of his horse Silver King, Bill Gallagher captures a couple of bandits who are terrorizing the town of Tombstone and is made sheriff. Evelyn Churchhill, a young woman evangelist, is kidnapped by outlaws. Burke, the Tombstone Bank president, is the secret leader of the gang. After Bill rescues Evelyn, Burke manages to have him arrested. Bill's horse brings the jail keys to his master. Bill gets loose, whips and exposes Burke, and wins the affection of Evelyn.

== Cast ==
- Fred Thomson as Bill Gallagher
- Hazel Keener as Evelyn Churchill
- Frank Hagney as Joseph Burke
- Nelson McDowell as Leon I. Berry
- N.E. Hendrix as Tub
- Andy Morris as Slim
- Lew Meehan as Henchman
- Bob Reeves as Cowhand
- Silver King the Horse as Bill's Horse
