= North of Nevada =

1924 film directed by Albert S. Rogell

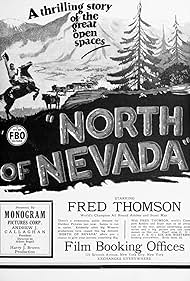
- Directed by: Albert S. Rogell
- Written by: Marion Jackson
- Produced by: Harry Joe Brown
- Starring: Fred Thomson; Hazel Keener; Josef Swickard
- Cinematography: Ross Fisher
- Production company: Harry J. Brown Productions
- Distributed by: Film Booking Offices of America
- Release date: February 24, 1924
- Running time: 5 reels
- Country: United States
- Language: Silent (English intertitles)

North of Nevada is a 1924 American silent Western film directed by Albert S. Rogell and starring Fred Thomson, Hazel Keener, and Josef Swickard.

== Plot ==
As described in a film magazine review, old Mark Ridgeway dies suddenly on his ranch, without having signed a will that provided that his foreman, Tom Taylor, was to inherit the property, which included an irrigation dam. Mark's daughter Marion and her brother Reginald arrive from the east, and they are the new owners of the ranch and dam. Joe Deerfoot, a renegade Indian who wants control of the irrigation dam, uses his gang to trick Marion and Reginald. After many adventures, including fights between Tom and Deerfoot near a cliff and the rescue from drowning of Tom by his steed Silver King, the plotters are defeated by Tom and Marion agrees to become his wife.

== Cast ==
- Fred Thomson as Tom Taylor
- Hazel Keener as Marion Ridgeway
- Josef Swickard as Mark Ridgeway
- Joe Butterworth as Red O'Shay
- Chester Conklin as Lem Williams
- Taylor Graves as Reginald Ridgeway
- George Magrill as Joe Deerfoot
- Wilfred Lucas as C. Hanaford
- Silver King the Horse as Tom's Horse

== Bibliography ==
- Munden, Kenneth White. The American Film Institute Catalog of Motion Pictures Produced in the United States, Part 1. University of California Press, 1997.
