= The Millionaire Cowboy =

1924 film

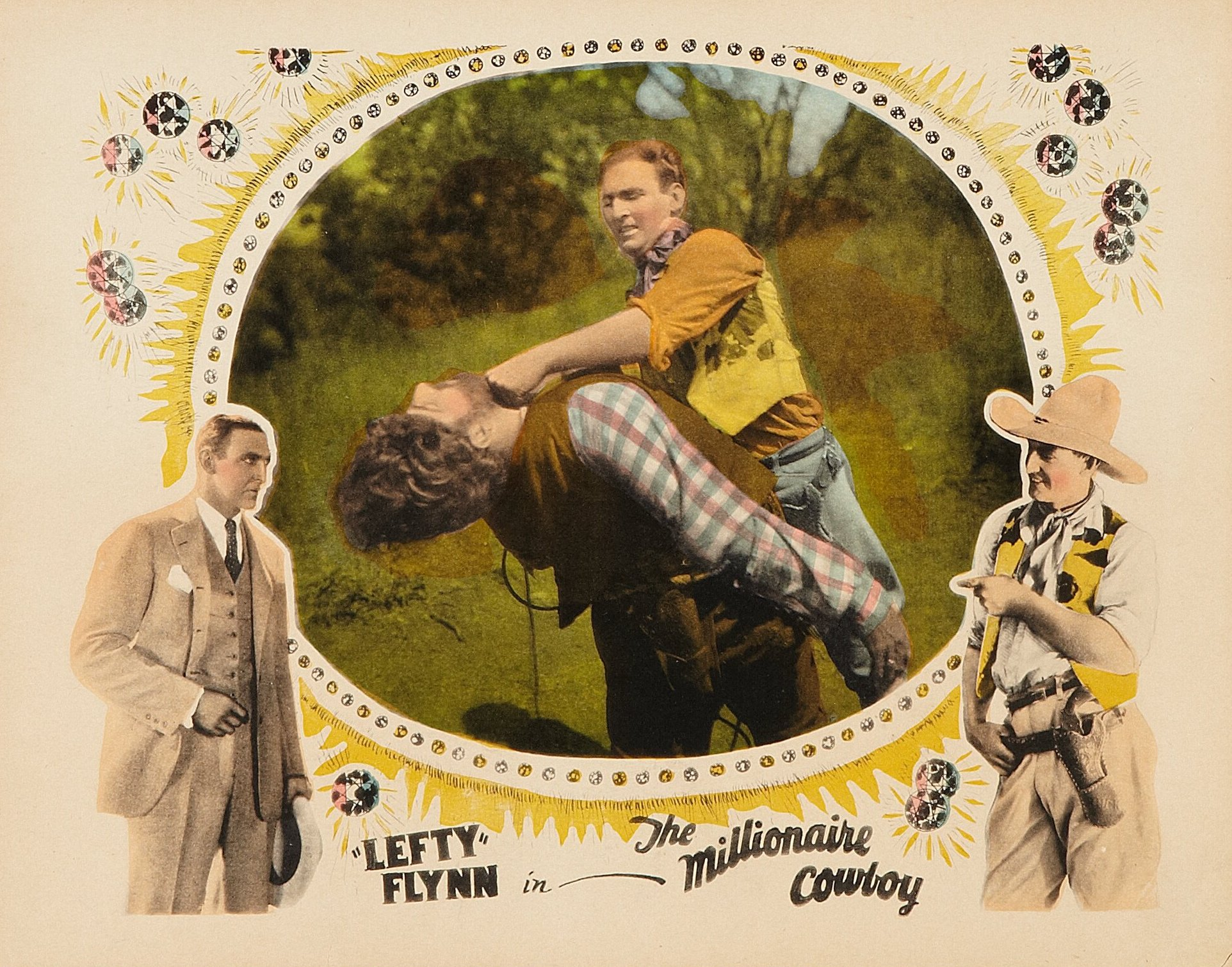
- Lobby card
- Directed by: Harry Garson
- Written by: Frank S. Beresford; Darryl F. Zanuck
- Produced by: Harry Garson
- Starring: Maurice 'Lefty' Flynn; Gloria Grey; Charles Crockett
- Cinematography: Lewis W. Physioc
- Production company: Harry Garson Productions
- Distributed by: Film Booking Offices of America
- Release date: October 5, 1924
- Running time: 50 minutes
- Country: United States
- Languages: Silent; English intertitles

The Millionaire Cowboy is a 1924 American silent Western film directed by Harry Garson and starring Maurice 'Lefty' Flynn, Gloria Grey and Charles Crockett.

== Cast ==
- Maurice 'Lefty' Flynn as Charles Christopher Meredyth Jr., aka 'Gallop'
- Gloria Grey as Pauline Truce
- Charles Crockett as Granville Truce
- Frederick Peters as Grafter Torso
- Daddy Hoosier as Buffalo Jones

== Bibliography ==
- Langman, Larry. A Guide to Silent Westerns. Greenwood Publishing Group, 1992.
