= Valley of the Lawless =

- Theatrical release poster
- Directed by: Robert North Bradbury
- Screenplay by: Charles F. Royal
- Produced by: A.W. Hackel
- Starring: Johnny Mack Brown; Joyce Compton; George "Gabby" Hayes; Frank Hagney; Dennis Moore; Bobby Nelson
- Cinematography: Bert Longenecker
- Edited by: S. Roy Luby
- Production company: Supreme Pictures
- Distributed by: Supreme Pictures
- Release date: January 25, 1936
- Running time: 56 minutes
- Country: United States
- Language: English

Valley of the Lawless is a 1936 American Western film directed by Robert North Bradbury and written by Charles F. Royal. The film stars Johnny Mack Brown, Joyce Compton, George "Gabby" Hayes, Frank Hagney, Dennis Moore and Bobby Nelson. The film was released on January 25, 1936, by Supreme Pictures.

== Cast ==
- Johnny Mack Brown as Bruce Reynolds
- Joyce Compton as Joan Jenkins
- George "Gabby" Hayes as Grandpaw Jenkins
- Frank Hagney as Garlow
- Dennis Moore as Cliff Grey
- Bobby Nelson as Billy Jenkins
- Charles King as Regan
- Jack Rockwell as Sheriff Grey
- Frank Ball as Amos Jenkins
