= Honor of the Range =

1934 film

- Original film poster
- Directed by: Alan James
- Written by: Nate Gatzert (story and screenplay)
- Produced by: Ken Maynard
- Starring: See below
- Cinematography: Ted D. McCord
- Edited by: Charles Harris
- Production company: Ken Maynard Productions Inc.
- Distributed by: Universal Pictures
- Release date: 16 April 1934
- Running time: 61 minutes
- Country: United States
- Language: English

Honor of the Range is a 1934 American Western film directed by Alan James and starring Ken Maynard who not only plays a sheriff and his disreputable brother, but impersonates a music hall singer.

== Plot ==
Clem the clerk conspires with a gang of outlaws to share the profits of a robbery when he gives the leader of the gang, 'Rawhide', the safe's combination.

Prior to robbing the business, Rawhide telephones the Sheriff that a rancher is being attacked by a group of cattle rustlers. Upon finding out the call is a hoax, the Sheriff and his posse return to catch the robbers in the act. A gunfight ensures with most of the outlaws escaping through a hole in the floor. Clem, the Sheriff's brother is found tied up, and nearly dies when the building catches fire in the gunfight,

Mr. Turner, the owner of the business discovers the robbery is an inside job when he finds the safe's combination on a note in Clem's handwriting. When the Sheriff refuses to pursue the outlaw gang until morning, one of the town folk, Boots, takes over as Sheriff and tie Ken, the old sheriff up.

Meanwhile, Clem escapes and brings his girlfriend and the daughter of the business, Mary Turner to the outlaw's hideout where he demands his share of the loot.

== Cast ==
- Ken Maynard as Sheriff Ken / Brother Clem
- Cecilia Parker as Mary Turner
- Fred Kohler as 'Rawhide'
- Frank Hagney as Deputy 'Boots'
- Jack Rockwell as Henchman Rocky
- James A. Marcus as Mr. Turner
- Albert J. Smith as Henchman 'Smokey'
- Eddie Barnes as Charlie Curzon (the vaudevillian)
- Slim Whitaker as Henchman Pete
- Franklyn Farnum as Saloonkeper
- Tarzan as Tarzan, Ken's Horse
