= The Fighting Sap =

1924 film directed by Albert S. Rogell

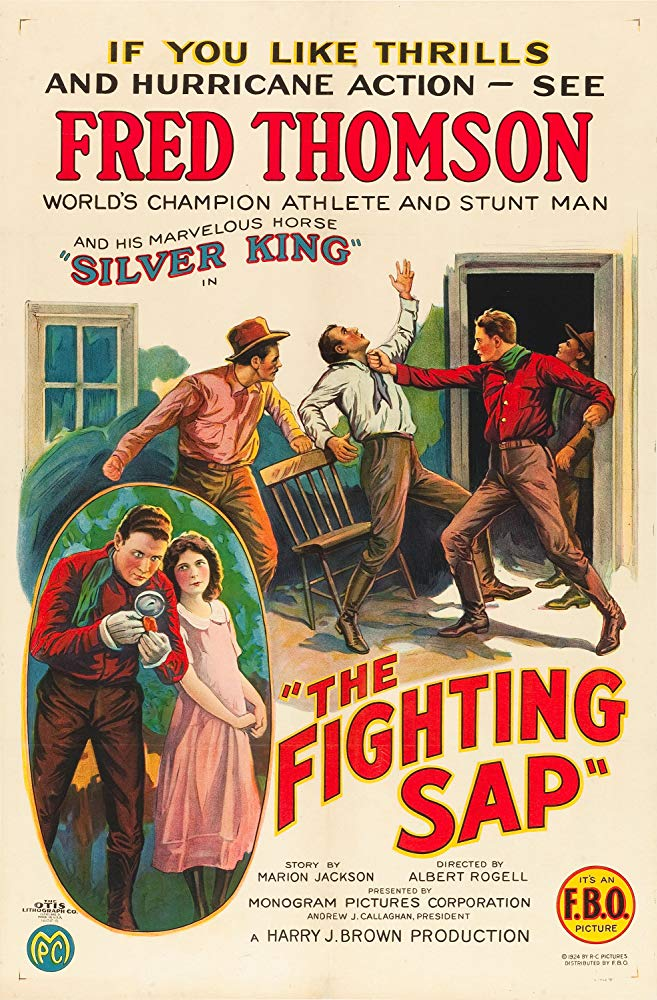
- Directed by: Albert S. Rogell
- Written by: Marion Jackson
- Produced by: Harry Joe Brown
- Starring: Fred Thomson; Wilfred Lucas; Hazel Keener
- Cinematography: Ross Fisher
- Production company: Film Booking Offices of America
- Distributed by: Film Booking Offices of America
- Release date: June 30, 1924
- Country: United States
- Languages: Silent; English intertitles

The Fighting Sap is a 1924 American silent Western film directed by Albert S. Rogell and starring Fred Thomson, Hazel Keener and Wilfred Lucas.

== Cast ==
- Fred Thomson as Craig Richmond
- Hazel Keener as Marjorie Stoddard
- Wilfred Lucas as Charles Richmond
- George B. Williams as Walter Stoddard
- Frank Hagney as Nebraska Brent
- Ralph Yearsley as Twister
- Bob Williamson as Chicago Kid
- Bob Fleming as Sheriff
