= Ports of Call (film) =

1925 film

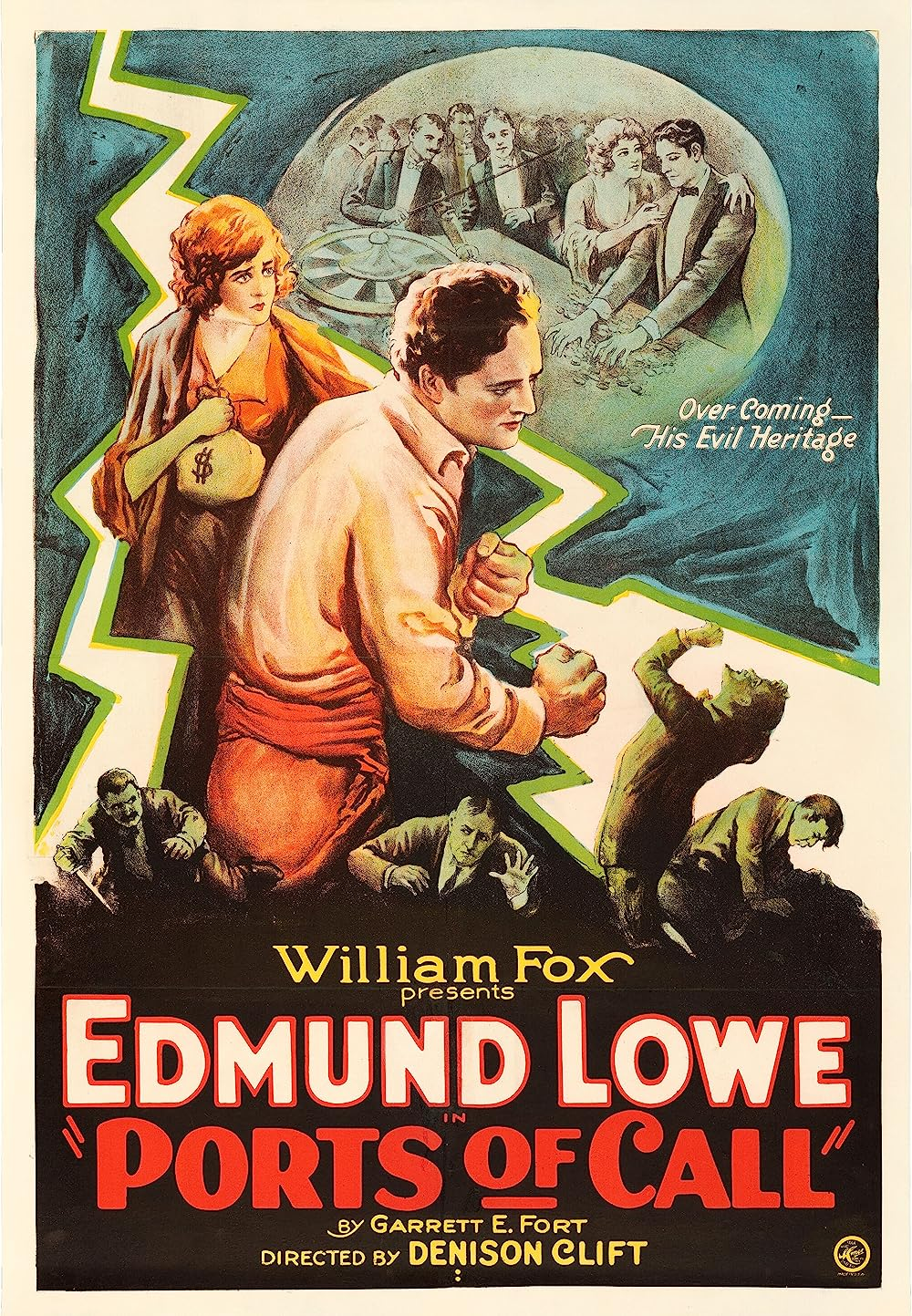
- Directed by: Denison Clift
- Written by: Edfrid A. Bingham
- Story by: Garrett Fort
- Starring: Edmund Lowe; Hazel Keener; William B. Davidson
- Cinematography: Allen M. Davey
- Production company: Fox Film Corporation
- Distributed by: Fox Film Corporation
- Release date: January 4, 1925
- Running time: 6 reels
- Country: United States
- Language: Silent (English intertitles)

Ports of Call is a lost 1925 American silent drama film directed by Denison Clift and starring Edmund Lowe, Hazel Keener, and William B. Davidson.

A young man demonstrates his apparent cowardice in the face of a house fire. Consequently, he is disinherited by his father and rejected by his love interest. He becomes a wandering derelict, and eventually arrives in Manila. He befriends a woman at a saloon brawl, and is also reacquainted with his former love interest. But he has arrived at the start of a local revolt, and he has to prove his bravery to save his loved ones.

== Plot ==
As described in a review in a film magazine, Kirk Rainsford (Lowe) and Randolph Sherman (Davidson) are rivals for the love of Marjorie Vail (Keener) when a fire occurs at the Vail home. Kirk proves himself a coward when he refuses to go and rescue Marjorie's little sister Peggy (McLain). Disgusted, Kirk's father (Conklin) disowns him and, through fast living that causes his downfall, he becomes a wandering derelict, finally landing in Manila.

In a saloon brawl he aids Lillie (Tashman), one of the women, and they become friends. She believes in him and, when he is attacked by thugs, encourages him. He fights them off. He suggests that they go to a friend of his in the country where they will find work. When they arrive, Kirk discovers that the farm has changed hands and is now owned by Sherman, who has married Marjorie. Lillie finds out about Marjorie's identity and her past relationship to Kirk. The local populace revolts and set fire to the farm house, and Kirk aids Marjorie to safety while Sherman is killed. Finding herself, Lillie leaves but Kirk, realizing that he loves her, follows and they find happiness together.

== Cast ==
- Edmund Lowe as Kirk Rainsford
- Hazel Keener as Marjorie Vail
- William B. Davidson as Randolph Sherman
- William Conklin as Archer Rainsford
- Bobbie Mack as Sly
- Lilyan Tashman as Lillie
- Alice Ward as Mrs. Rainsford
- Mary McLain as Peggy

== Preservation ==
With no prints of Ports of Call located in any film archives, it is a lost film.

== Bibliography ==
- Solomon, Aubrey (2011). The Fox Film Corporation, 1915-1935: A History and Filmography. McFarland. ISBN 978-0-7864-6286-5.
