= Into Her Kingdom =

1926 film by Svend Gade

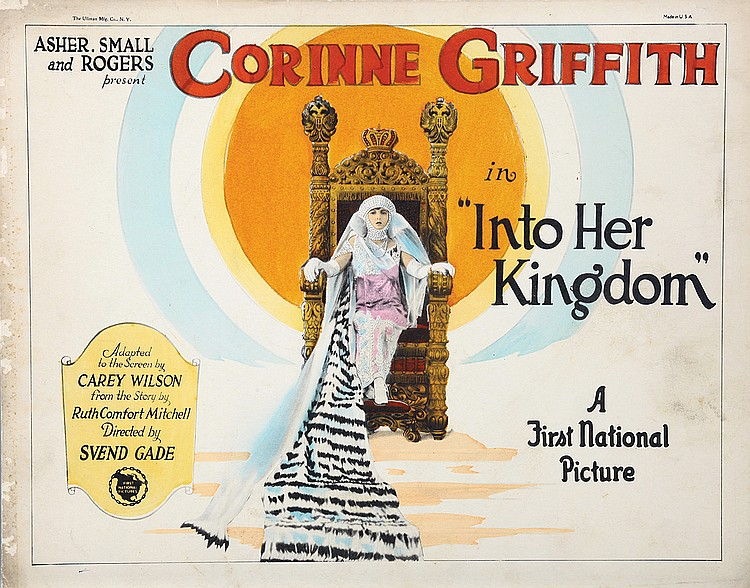
- Lobby card
- Directed by: Svend Gade
- Written by: Ruth Comfort Mitchell (story); Carey Wilson; William M. Conselman
- Produced by: Corinne Griffith
- Starring: Corinne Griffith; Einar Hanson; Claude Gillingwater; Charles Crockett; Evelyn Selbie
- Cinematography: Harold Wenstrom
- Distributed by: First National Pictures
- Release date: August 8, 1926
- Running time: 7 reels
- Country: United States
- Language: Silent (English intertitles)

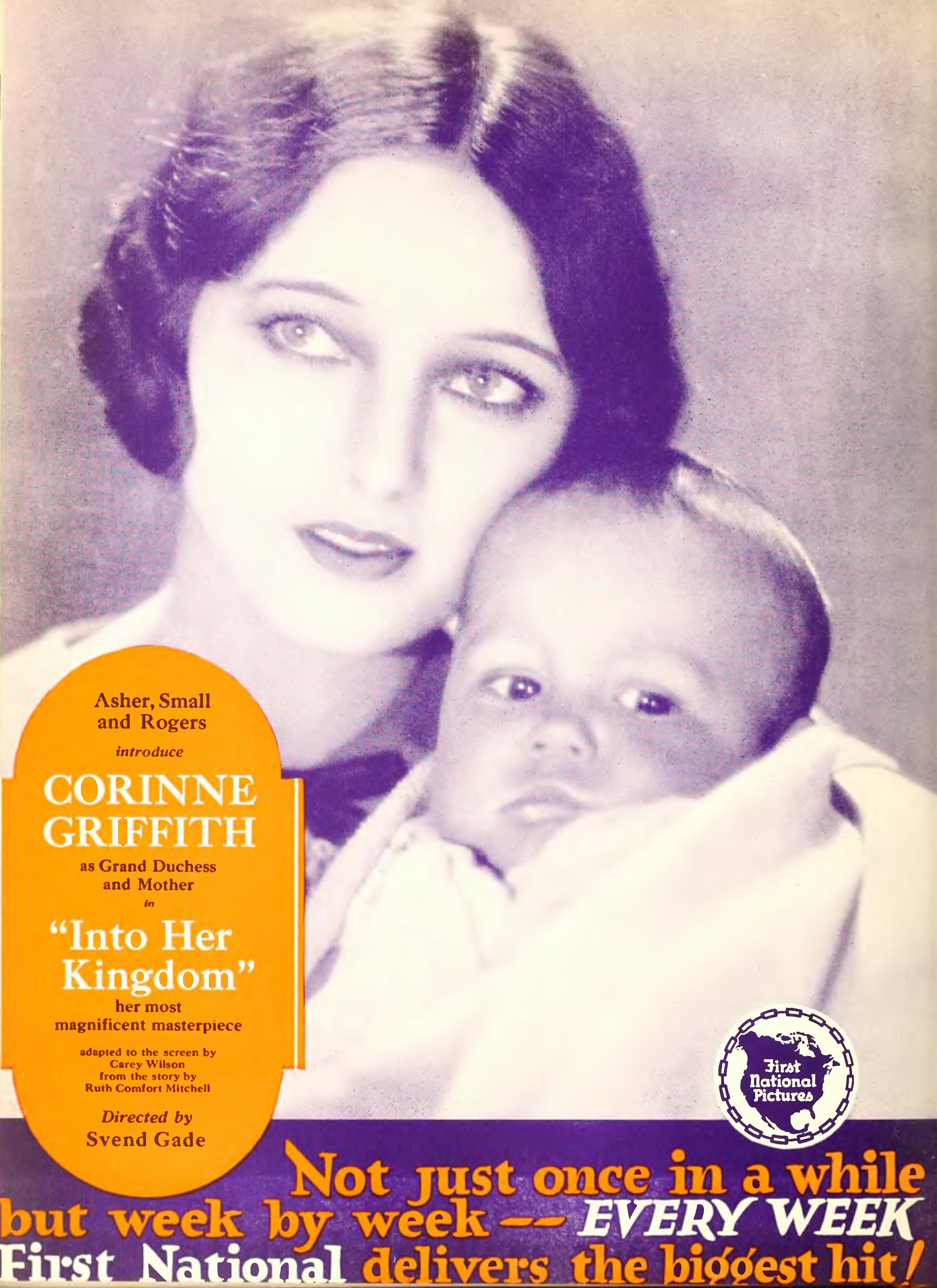
Into Her Kingdom ad in Motion Picture News, 1926

Into Her Kingdom is a 1926 American silent romantic drama film directed by Svend Gade and starring Corinne Griffith. The film, which dramatizes the Russian Revolution, featured a Technicolor sequence. It was based on a 1925 short story of the same name by Ruth Comfort Mitchell, originally published in Red Book Magazine. It is not known whether the film currently survives.

== Cast ==
- Corinne Griffith as Grand Duchess Tatiana at 12 and 20
- Einar Hanson as Stepan, Son of a Peasant at 14 and 22) (credited as Einar Hansen)
- Claude Gillingwater as Ivan, Their Tutor
- Charles Crockett as Senov, A Carnival Fakir
- Evelyn Selbie as Stepan's Mother
- Larry Fisher as A Farmhand
- H.C. Simmons as Czar Nicholas
- Ellinor Vanderveer as Czarina (credited as Elinor Vanderveer)
- Byron Sage as Zarevitch
- Tom Murray as Bolshevik Guard
- Marcelle Corday as Tatiana's Maid
- Michael Pleschkoff as Court Chamberlain (credited as Major General Michael N. Pleschkoff)
- Max Davidson as Shoestring Salesman
- Allan Sears as American Customer
- Mary Louise Miller as Daughter of Stepan and Tatiana
- Theodore Lodi as Russian Officer and Court Leader (credited as General Lodijensky)
- Alexander Ikonnikov as Russian Officer and Court Leader (credited as Major General Ikanikoff)
- Nicholas Bogomoletz as Russian Officer and Court Leader (credited as Major General Bogomoletz)
- George Blagoi as Russian Officer and Court Leader (credited as Lieutenant George Blagoi)
- Gene Walski as Russian Officer and Court Leader (credited as Lieutenant Gene Walski)
- Feodor Chaliapin Jr. as Russian Officer and Court Leader (credited as Feador Chalyapin Jr.)
- George Davis as Russian Officer and Court Leader

== Production ==
This was the second to last directorial effort of Svend Gade in the United States before returning to Denmark. At the time of production, several expatriate members of the Czarist Russian nobility and military class were living in the Los Angeles area and working as extras in films. Some were recruited to serves as cast members and technical advisors on this film. In a Technicolor insert, running 221 feet, the Weaver of Fate picks out multicolored cords and plays tricks with them. The red cord represents the girl and the brown cord represents the boy.
