= The Vanishing American =

1925 film

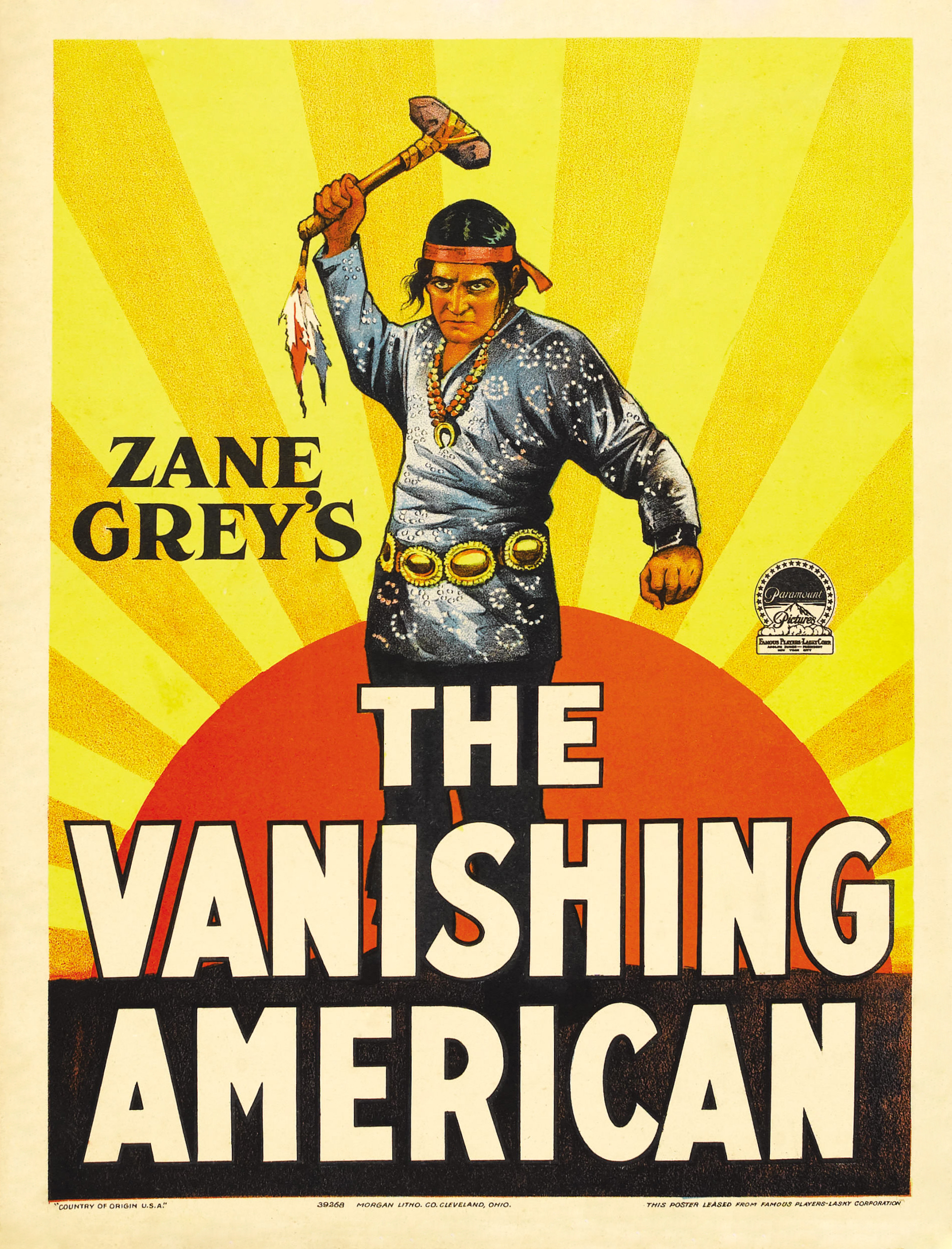
- Theatrical poster
- Directed by: George B. Seitz
- Written by: Lucien Hubbard (adaptation); Ethel Doherty (scenario)
- Based on: The Vanishing American by Zane Grey
- Produced by: Adolph Zukor; Jesse Lasky
- Starring: Richard Dix; Lois Wilson
- Cinematography: C. Edgar Schoenbaum; Harry Perry
- Music by: Manny Baer; Hugo Riesenfeld
- Distributed by: Paramount Pictures
- Release date: October 15, 1925
- Running time: 110 minutes (10 reels)
- Country: United States
- Languages: Silent (English intertitles)

The Vanishing American (full film)

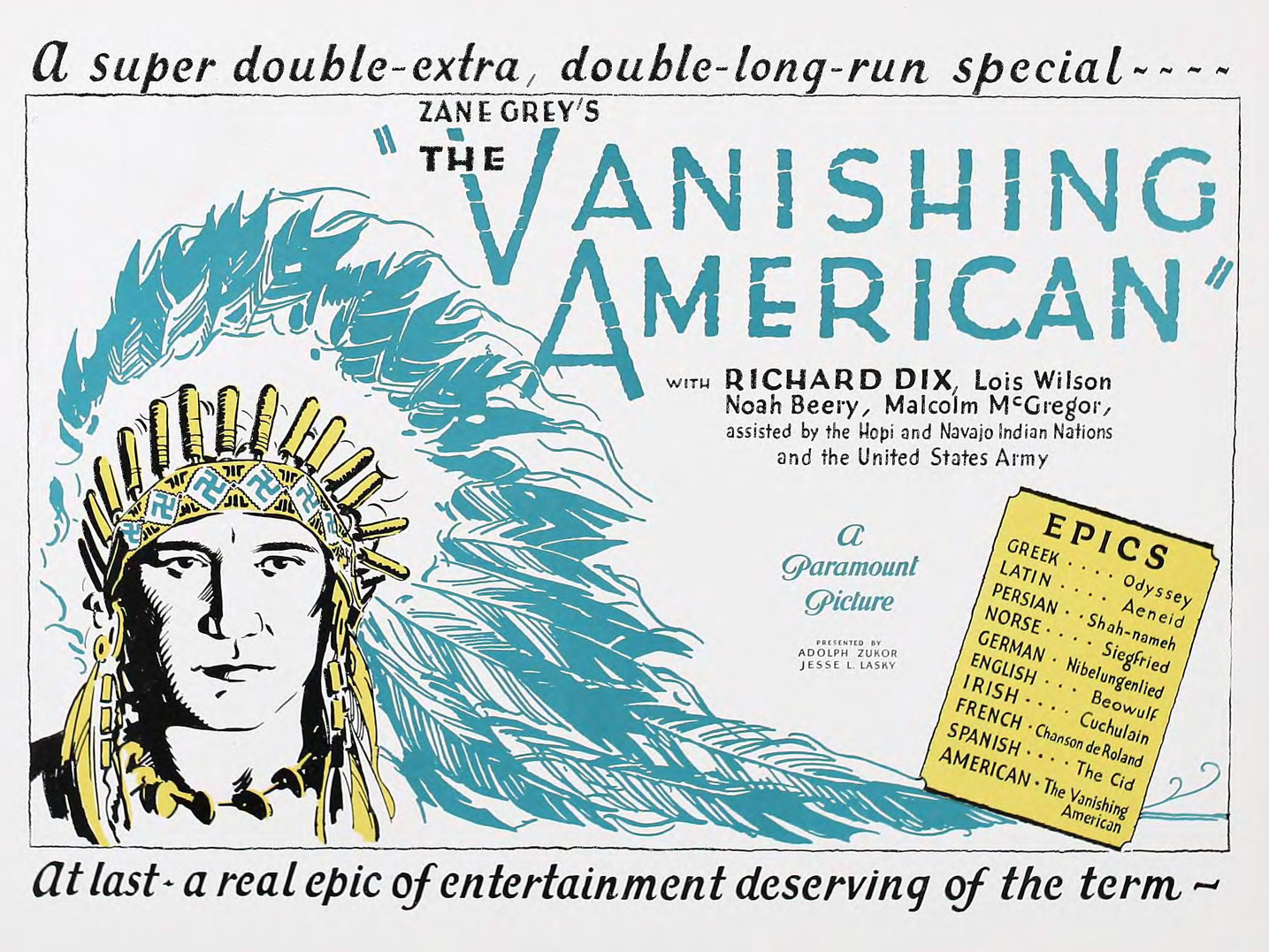
The Vanishing American 1925 film advertisement

The Vanishing American is a 1925 American silent Western film produced by Famous Players–Lasky and distributed through Paramount Pictures. The film was directed by George B. Seitz and starred Richard Dix and Lois Wilson, recently paired in several screen dramas by Paramount. The film is based on the 1925 novel The Vanishing American by Zane Grey. It was remade as a 1955 film starring Scott Brady and Audrey Totter.

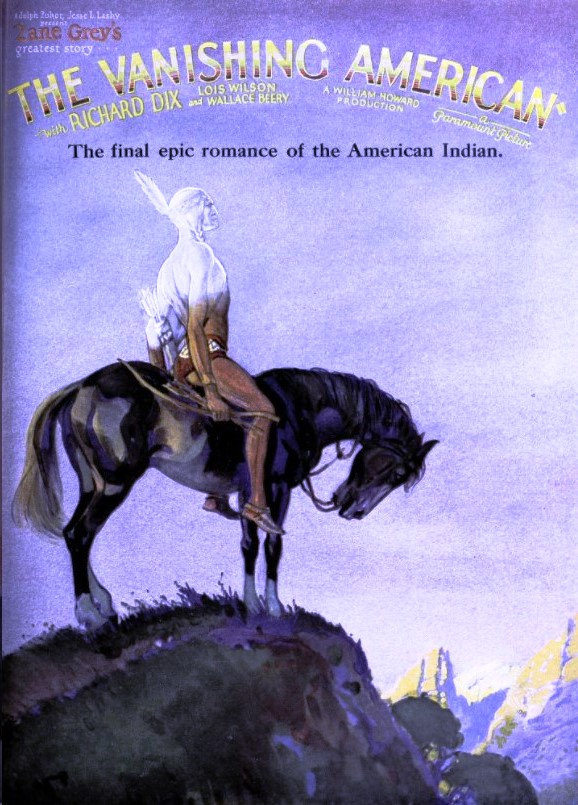
The Vanishing American 1925 advertisement

The story first appeared in November 1922 as a serial in Ladies' Home Journal. Harper & Brothers planned the book's publication to coincide with the film's release but Christian missionaries feared public criticism. Harper editors thus altered the story before publication, ultimately causing a delay between the release of the two different pieces.

== History of adaptation ==
Grey's serialized novel, published in Ladies’ Home Journal in 1922–1923, was one of the first pieces of literature produced which offered a harsh portrayal of American government policies towards Native Americans. Grey depicted the white settlers as missionaries who preyed upon the subordinate race, forcefully converting them into Christianity and altering their way of life. This depiction sparked a lot of backlash in the form of angry letters from readers once the novels were published. According to Zane Grey's biographer, Thomas Pauly, “The magazine was deluged with angry letters from religious groups, and the Bureau of Indian Affairs vehemently denounced his depiction of their efforts.”

In response to critics of the novel, Lasky persuaded Grey to dilute the negative portrayal of the American government in the film. Grey agreed, and instead of Americans monolithically demonstrating contempt towards Native Americans, the script instead placed most of the blame on the corrupt choices of an individual character, Booker.

According to an interview with Lasky in September 1925, the idea for adapting Grey's novel into a feature film originated in 1922 when he and Lucien Hubbard, the editorial supervisor for Zane Grey Productions, received an invitation from Grey to visit Navajo Mountain and Rainbow Bridge in northern Arizona. The reservation's stark and boundless desert scenery captivated Lasky and after spending nearly two months there, he suggested they use the vast ranges as the background for a motion picture.

== Plot ==
The film opens long ago in Monument Valley, after tribes of Native Americans have defeated other ancient cliff dwellers; afterwards, Europeans arrived to conquer the Native Americans. Later, in the early 20th century, a tribe of Navajo are living on a reservation overseen by an individual who hates Native Americans, named Booker. He and his men steal the best Native American's horses for their own profit. Nophaie, a tribal leader, complains to Booker's superiors, but he is unable to gain fair treatment from the whites. When World War I breaks out, Army Captain Earl Ramsdale comes west in search of the horses that Booker was supposed to have bought from the Natives for a fair price. Marian Warner, the teacher at the Native American School, befriended Nophaie, teaching him to read; she convinces him that the Great War is a fight for a more just world, and that, when that world comes, the Native Americans will be treated better. Nophaie, not only brings horses for the Army, he and many others enlist, and distinguish themselves in battle. But when they come back after the war is over, they find life for the Native Americans even worse than when had they left. When they go on the warpath, Nophaie rides to warn the Whites. Nophaie and Booker die in the fighting, and Nophaie's sole comfort is dying in the arms of Marion, whom he loved. The film is a mixture of contradictory stereotypes that aims to show its viewers the subjugation of the Native American people during the time of World War I. Nophaie and his people ultimately come to realize that their traditional ways of life may be coming to an end. They also note that there is an equal place for them within White America.

== Cast ==
- Richard Dix as Nophaie,
- Lois Wilson as Marion Warner
- Noah Beery as Booker
- Malcolm McGregor as Earl Ramsdale
- Nocki as Indian Boy
- Shannon Day as Gekin Yashi
- Charles Crockett as Amos Halliday
- Bert Woodruff as Bart Wilson
- Bernard Siegel as Do Etin
- Guy Oliver as Kit Carson
- Joe Ryan as Jay Lord
- Charles Stevens as Shoie
- Bruce Gordon as Rhur
- Richard Howard as Glendon
- John Webb Dillon as Naylor
- Gary Cooper, unbilled

== Production ==
The Vanishing American was produced by Famous Player-Lasky and distributed through Paramount Pictures, and it is considered to be one of the most ambitious productions of the Twenties. The film began production in June 1925 and finished that September. The majority of the film was shot on the Navajo Nation, including locations in Monument Valley, Rainbow Bridge and Tsegi Canyon. According to newspaper publicity at the time, 500 cast and crew members were brought in from Hollywood and over 1,000 Native American were used for extras. Filming in a remote location created difficulties for the film crew and they often had to stop due to sandstorms, summer rainstorms, and because of the road conditions, the trucks being used for filming frequently blew tires. The film is timed at 110 minutes long.

Parts of the film were shot in Monument Valley and Rainbow Bridge National Monument in Utah, and in Tuba City and Sagi Canyon in Arizona.

During filming, 14 bison were brought onto Catalina Island. While unused in the film, the bison remain there to this day.

== Reviews ==
Audiences and critics responded positively to the film, and it earned critical acclaim as one of the first films of its type to address the mistreatment of indigenous peoples by white settlers. A review by The Motion Picture News in 1925 stated, “It is an epic of the Indian, his beginnings, his rise to power and glory, his fall and the tragic qualities of his existence today.” The Motion Picture News continued, saying, “The Vanishing American is destined to general popularity and ranks with the best of its type. It depicts beautiful scenes which picture the coming of the Redman as we know him.” Film historian Kevin Brownlow has praised the film noting that "The problem of the Indian and his betrayal by the government was more clearly etched in this picture than in any other silent film."

Mordaunt Hall of The New York Times had some reservations about the performances, but he admired the film's "matchless photography" and the "great artistry" of the cliff dwelling and World War I battle sequences. He also praised Hugo Riesenfeld's score, which the composer himself conducted for the film's premiere at the Criterion Theatre.

== Status ==
This film survives at several restoration archives such as the Library of Congress and is available on home video and DVD.

== See also ==
- Vanishing Indian
- The House That Shadows Built (1931) promotional film released by Paramount with excerpt of this film
