= Guilty Hands =

1931 film

- Swedish theatrical poster
- Directed by: W. S. Van Dyke
- Written by: Bayard Veiller (story and screenplay)
- Produced by: Hunt Stromberg (uncredited)
- Starring: Lionel Barrymore; Kay Francis
- Cinematography: Merritt B. Gerstad
- Edited by: Anne Bauchens
- Production company: Metro-Goldwyn-Mayer
- Distributed by: Metro-Goldwyn-Mayer
- Release date: August 22, 1931
- Running time: 68-69 minutes
- Country: United States
- Language: English

Guilty Hands is a 1931 American pre-Code crime film starring Lionel Barrymore and Kay Francis and directed by W. S. Van Dyke. The story concerns an attorney who murders a man who wants to marry his daughter.

== Plot ==
On a train trip, lawyer Richard Grant tells fellow passengers that, based on his long experience both prosecuting and defending murder cases, murder is sometimes justified and a clever man should be able to commit it undetected. Grant is traveling to the isolated estate of his wealthy client and friend Gordon Rich. His young adult daughter Barbara surprises him at the train station, where she informs him that she has already been there for a week.

Rich asks Grant to rewrite his will, including bequests to all his former mistresses (except a 16-year-old whom Grant believes committed suicide). When Rich explains that he wants a new will because he intends to marry Barbara, Grant is appalled.

Grant pleads with his daughter, emphasizing the age difference and Rich's indecent character, but she loves Rich and is adamant. Tommy Osgood, a young suitor of Barbara's age, has also been unable to change her mind.

At a dinner party that night, Rich announces the wedding and says that it will take place in the morning. His longtime girlfriend Marjorie West is dismayed, but after the party, he assures Marjorie that he will return to her once he exhausts his obsession with Barbara.

Rich orders two servants to watch Grant's bungalow on the estate, but Grant uses a cutout mounted on a record player to cast a moving shadow on the curtain to make it appear that he is pacing restlessly. He slips back to the main house. Meanwhile, Rich goes to Barbara's room and tries to force himself on her, but she recoils in disgust and he leaves.

Rich writes a letter to the police accusing Grant in case he is found dead. Grant sneaks into the room, takes Rich's gun from his desk and shoots him during a clap of thunder. Grant places the gun in the Rich's hand, takes the letter and returns to his room just in time to be seen by the servants. When the body is discovered, Grant insists that Rich must have committed suicide. To Grant's shock, Barbara soon informs him that she had changed her mind about the wedding, rendering the crime unnecessary.

Marjorie is certain that Rich was murdered. She determines how Grant concocted his alibi and then finds the imprint of the incriminating letter on the desk blotter. However, Grant returns and wrestles the evidence from her. He tells her that if she accuses him, he will concoct a convincing murder case against her, as she had an obvious motive for murder as Rich's beneficiary and was heard screaming when Rich was killed. If she stays silent, she is free to enjoy Rich's fortune.

The police arrive, and the chief, Grant's old friend, accepts his conclusion that it was suicide. Marjorie finally decides to speak out, but just then a rigor mortis contraction of the Rich's trigger finger fires the gun, fatally wounding Grant. He asks Tommy to take good care of Barbara. Seeing no reason to hurt Barbara, Marjorie remains silent.

== Cast ==
- Lionel Barrymore as Richard Grant
- Kay Francis as Marjorie West
- Madge Evans as Barbara "Babs" Grant
- William Bakewell as Tommy Osgood
- C. Aubrey Smith as Reverend Hastings
- Polly Moran as Aunt Maggie
- Alan Mowbray as Gordon Rich
- Forrester Harvey as Spencer Wilson
- Charles Crockett as H. G. Smith
- Henry Barrows as Harvey Scott
- Sam McDaniel as Jimmy (uncredited)
- Blue Washington as Johnny (uncredited)
