= The Mask of Lopez =

1924 film directed by Albert S. Rogell

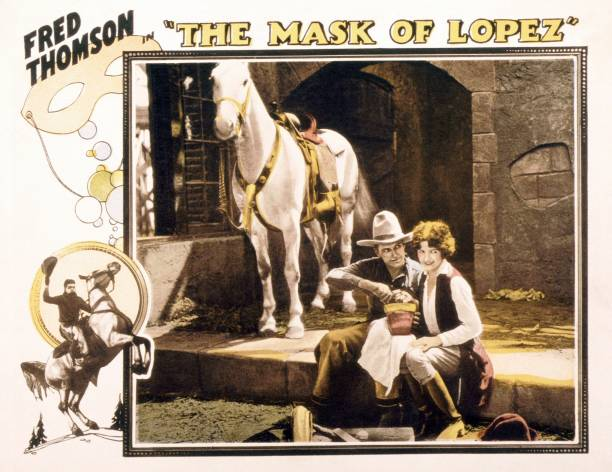
- Directed by: Albert S. Rogell
- Written by: Marion Jackson; Frances Marion
- Produced by: Harry Joe Brown
- Starring: Fred Thomson; Wilfred Lucas; Hazel Keener
- Cinematography: Ross Fisher
- Production company: Film Booking Offices of America
- Distributed by: Film Booking Offices of America
- Release date: January 27, 1924
- Running time: 50 minutes
- Country: United States
- Language: Silent (English intertitles)

The Mask of Lopez is a 1924 American silent Western film directed by Albert S. Rogell, and starring Fred Thomson, Wilfred Lucas, and Hazel Keener.

== Cast ==
- Fred Thomson as Jack O'Neil / Lopez
- Wilfred Lucas as Richard O'Neil
- David Kirby as Angel Face Hary
- Hazel Keener as Doris Hampton
- Frank Hagney as Steve Gore
- George Magrill as Pancho
- Gilbert Holmes as Shorty
- Bob Reeves as Dick
- Dick Sutherland as Mexican
- Dot Farley as Townswoman

== Bibliography ==
- Munden, Kenneth White. The American Film Institute Catalog of Motion Pictures Produced in the United States, Part 1. University of California Press, 1997.
