= The Princess from Hoboken =

1927 film

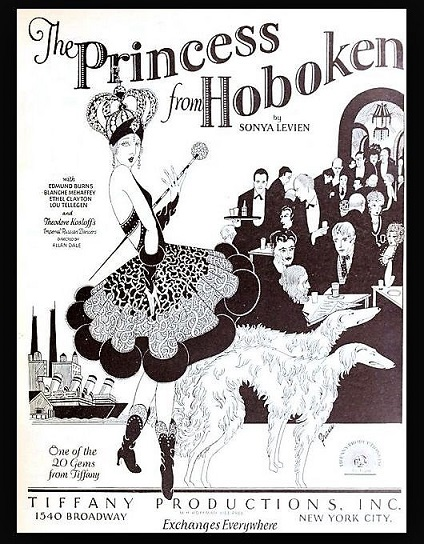
- Film poster
- Directed by: Allen Dale
- Written by: Sonya Levien
- Starring: Edmund Burns; Blanche Mehaffey
- Cinematography: Joseph A. Du Bray; Robert Martin
- Edited by: James C. McKay
- Distributed by: Tiffany Pictures
- Release date: March 1, 1927
- Running time: 1 hour
- Country: United States
- Language: Silent (English intertitles)

The Princess from Hoboken is a 1927 American silent comedy film directed by Allen Dale and featuring Boris Karloff.

== Cast ==
- Edmund Burns as Terence O'Brien
- Blanche Mehaffey as Sheila O'Toole
- Ethel Clayton as Mrs. O'Brien
- Lou Tellegen as Prince Anton Balakrieff
- Babe London as Princess Sonia Alexandernova Karpoff
- Will Walling as Mr. O'Brien (credited as Will R. Walling)
- Charles McHugh as Pa O'Toole
- Aggie Herring as Ma O'Toole
- Charles Crockett as Whiskers
- Robert Homans as McCoy
- Harry A. Bailey as Cohen (credited as Harry Bailey)
- Sidney D'Albrook as Tony
- Broderick O'Farrell as Immigration Officer
- Boris Karloff as Pavel

== Preservation ==
This film survives at the BFI National Archive.

== See also ==
- Boris Karloff filmography
- List of rediscovered films
