= Fighting Luck =

1925 film directed by J. P. McGowan

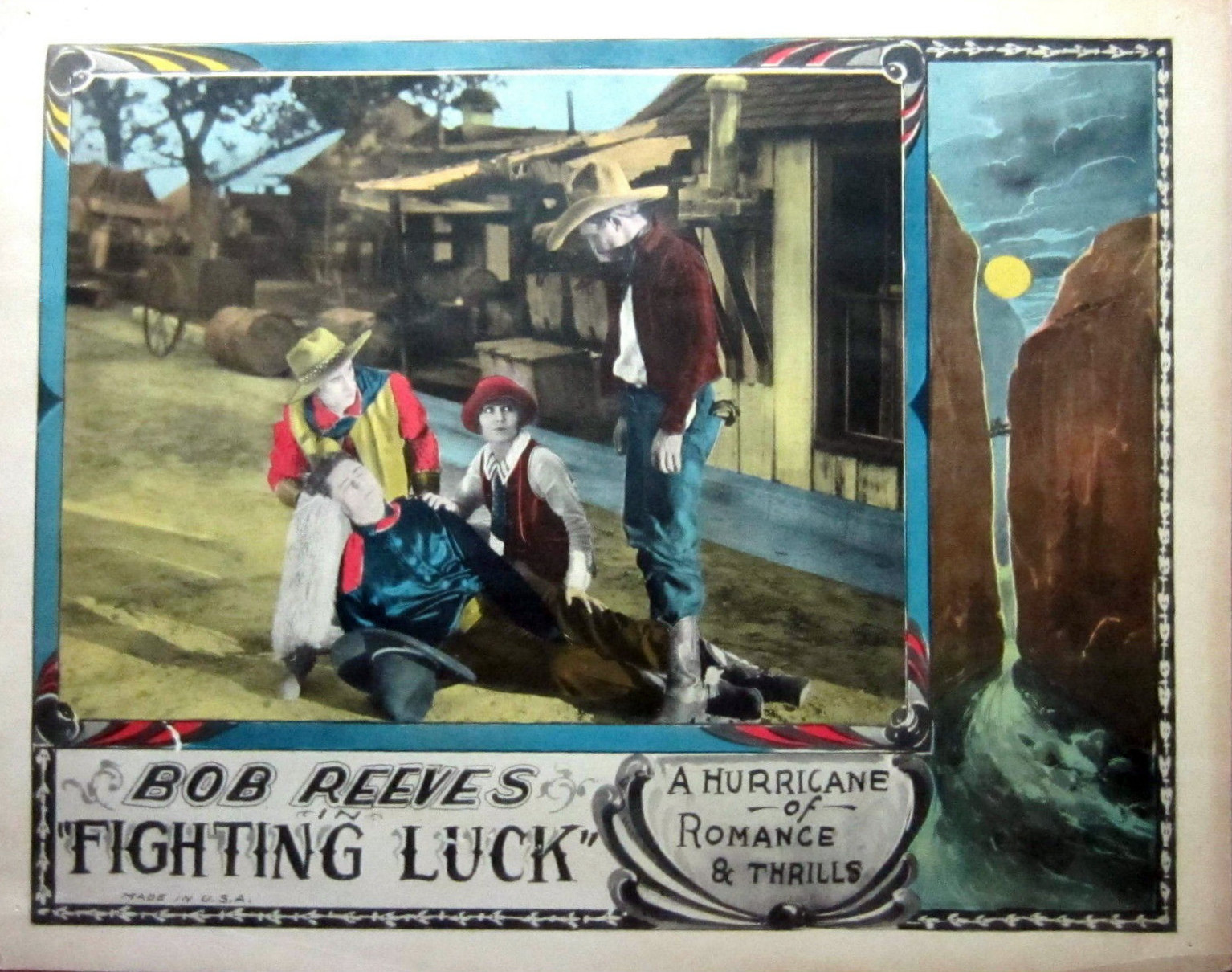
- Directed by: J.P. McGowan
- Produced by: Larry Wheeler
- Starring: Bob Reeves; Ione Reed; Lew Meehan
- Production company: Larry Wheeler Productions
- Distributed by: Anchor Film Distributors; Rayart Pictures
- Release date: July 1925
- Running time: 50 minutes
- Country: United States
- Languages: Silent; English intertitles

Fighting Luck is a 1925 American silent Western film directed by J.P. McGowan and starring Bob Reeves, Ione Reed and Lew Meehan.

== Synopsis ==
The story centers on a rugged cowboy hero (Bob Reeves) who finds himself embroiled in a classic frontier conflict involving land rights, outlaws, and personal honor. As he navigates the dangers of the Old West, he encounters romance with a spirited heroine (Ione Reed) while facing off against a villainous gang led by a ruthless antagonist (Lew Meehan).

== Cast ==
- Bob Reeves as Tiger Slauson
- Ione Reed as Texas Houston
- William Ryno as Silver Houston
- Lew Meehan as Dude Slade (The Coyote)
- Eddie Barry as Cousin Oswald aka Wilkdcat
- J.P. McGowan as Gang Leader

== Bibliography ==
- Munden, Kenneth White. The American Film Institute Catalog of Motion Pictures Produced in the United States, Part 1. University of California Press, 1997.
