= The Dangerous Coward =

1924 film directed by Albert S. Rogell

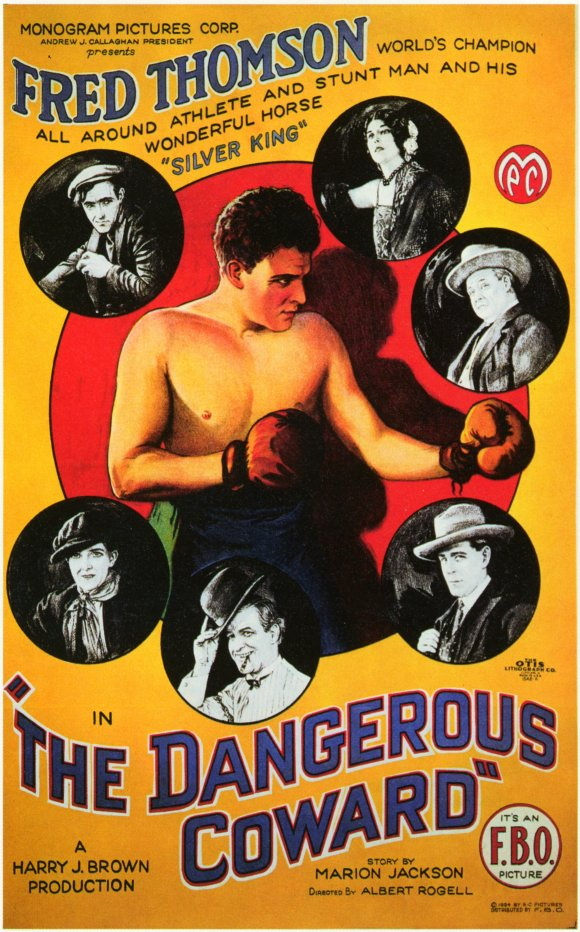
- Directed by: Albert S. Rogell
- Written by: Marion Jackson
- Produced by: Harry Joe Brown
- Starring: Fred Thomson; Hazel Keener; Frank Hagney
- Cinematography: Ross Fisher
- Production company: Film Booking Offices of America
- Distributed by: Film Booking Offices of America
- Release date: May 26, 1924
- Country: United States
- Languages: Silent; English intertitles

The Dangerous Coward is a 1924 American silent Western sports film directed by Albert S. Rogell and starring Fred Thomson, Hazel Keener and Frank Hagney.

== Cast ==
- Fred Thomson as Bob Trent aka The Lightning Kid
- Hazel Keener as Hazel McGuinn
- Frank Hagney as Wildcat Rex
- Andrew Arbuckle as David McGuinn
- David Kirby as Red O'Hara
- Al Kaufman as Battling Benson
- Lillian Adrian as Conchita
- Jim Corey as The Weazel
