= The Thrill Chaser =

1923 film directed by Edward Sedgwick

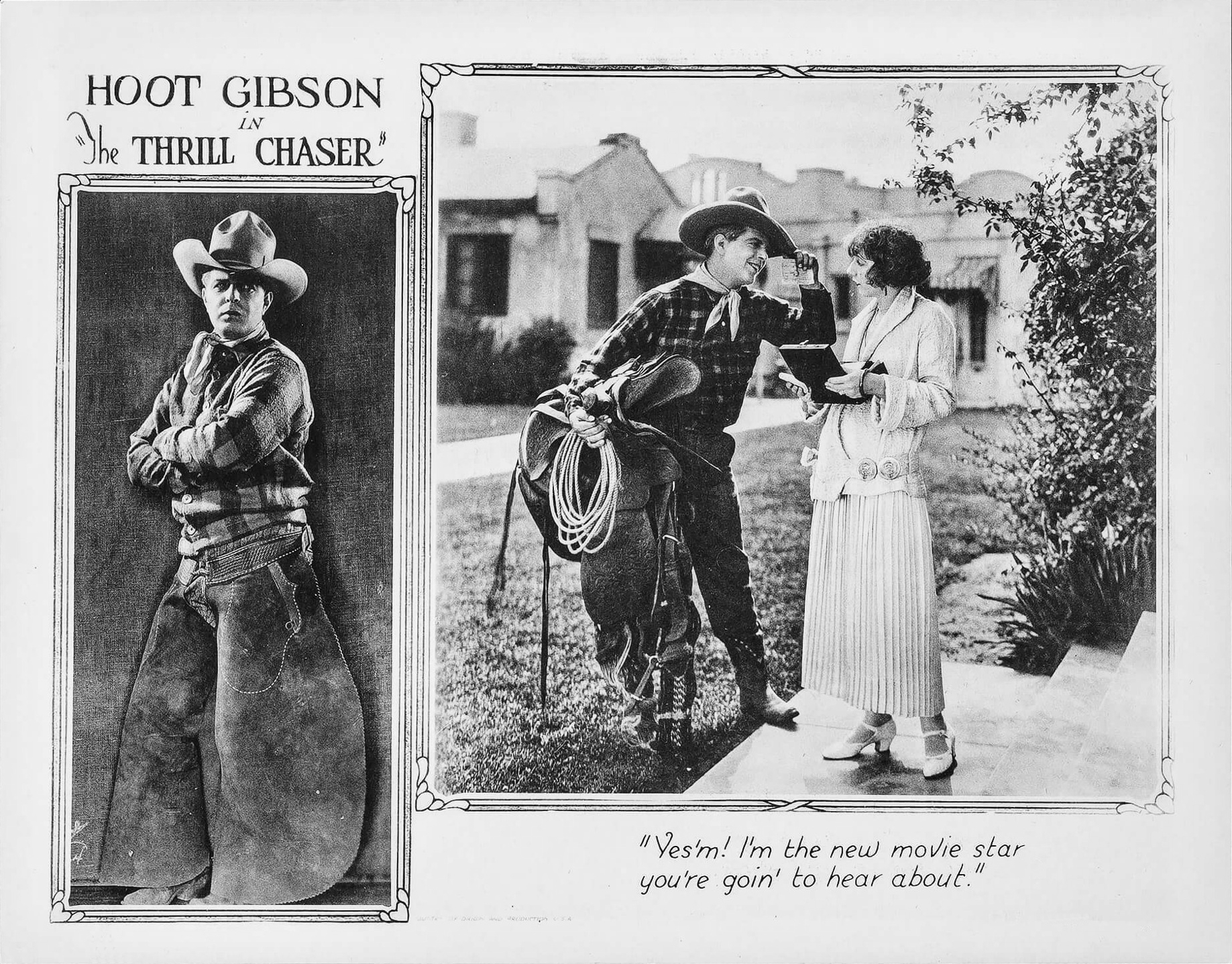
- Lobby card
- Directed by: Edward Sedgwick
- Written by: Richard Schayer; Raymond L. Schrock; Edward Sedgwick
- Produced by: Hoot Gibson; Carl Laemmle
- Starring: Hoot Gibson
- Cinematography: Virgil Miller
- Production company: Hoot Gibson Productions
- Distributed by: Universal Pictures
- Release date: November 26, 1923
- Running time: 60 minutes
- Country: United States
- Language: Silent (English intertitles)

The Thrill Chaser is a lost 1923 American silent Western film directed by Edward Sedgwick and featuring Hoot Gibson.

== Plot ==
As described in a film magazine, Omar K. Jenkins' only inheritance from an eccentric father is a copy of the Rubaiyat of Omar Khayyam. Only one of the verses conveys any meaning to him: “A book of verses underneath a bough, a loaf of bread, a jug of wine and thou.” He is reading it under a tree when he finds himself face to face with the “thou" of his dreams. They strike up an immediate friendship over the book of poems, when suddenly the whistle from the locomotive warns them her train is about to start. He aids her in making the train, riding alongside the moving cars and passing her from his horse to the platform. He has forgotten to get her name.

Omar goes to Los Angeles and begins to haunt the film studios. At Universal City he finally gets within the gates as an extra man. Here he meets all the celebrated stars and directors on the lot in a series of highly diverting comedy situations and scenes. The new remake of The Last Days of Pompeii is being filmed, with Hobart Henley directing Reginald Denny and Laura La Plante. Omar's job is carrying a mean spear in this one at three bucks a day. It was when his spear and the rope which was to bring about the destruction of the Roman palace on the film set got mixed up that Omar's career began. He tugged on his spear, and the rope gets pulled early and the palace at Pompeii crashes. Omar gets one more chance at the studio. Omar is engaged to double for a young star who is playing an Arabian role. Among the visitors at the studio on this day are three mysterious foreigners, who watch proceedings from the side lines. They are Sheik Ussan, head of a desert tribe in Arabia, and his daughter Olala, and Prince Ahmend. Omar is engaged to return to Arabia with the old sheik and his daughter and “double for” Prince Ahmend until such a time as Prince Ahmend feels like coming over himself.

== Cast ==
- Hoot Gibson as Omar K. Jenkins
- James Neill as Sheik Ussan
- Billie Dove as Olala Ussan
- W. E. Lawrence as Prince Ahmed (credited as William E. Lawrence)
- Bob Reeves as Lem Bixley
- Gino Corrado as Rudolph Biggeddo (credited as Gino Gerrado)
- Lloyd Whitlock as Abdul Bey
- King Baggot as Cameo appearance
- Reginald Denny as Cameo appearance
- Hobart Henley as Cameo appearance
- Norman Kerry as Cameo appearance
- Laura La Plante as Cameo appearance
- Mary Philbin as Cameo appearance
- Edward Sedgwick as Cameo appearance

== Preservation ==
With no prints of The Thrill Chaser located in any film archives, it is a lost film.

== See also ==
- Hoot Gibson filmography
