= Marion Jackson =

American screenwriter

- Born: December 3, 1879; Walla Walla, Washington, U.S.
- Died: November 28, 1962 (aged 82); Los Angeles, California, U.S.
- Occupation: Screenwriter
- Years active: 1924–39

Marion Jackson (December 3, 1879 – November 28, 1962) was an American screenwriter of the late silent and early sound film eras. During her 15-year career she would pen the scripts for over 40 films, both original and adaptations.

== Biography ==
Born in Walla Walla, Washington, she wrote her first script, an original screenplay, which was produced by Monogram Pictures in 1924, The Mask of Lopez, directed by Albert Rogell.

It would be her most prolific year, as she would contribute to 11 screenplays that year, either as the screenwriter, or providing the story, or adapting from another source. One of the films she adapted that year was 1924's A Boy of Flanders, from Marie Louise de la Ramée's 1872 novel, A Dog of Flanders. The film was directed by Victor Schertzinger, and starred Jackie Coogan.

Some of her notable films were her 1928 adaptation of The Shepherd of the Hills, based on the 1907 novel of the same name by Harold Bell Wright; her original screenplay for The Wagon Master (1929), starring Ken Maynard; and the hit film, Min and Bill (1930), which she co-wrote with Frances Marion, which stars Marie Dressler and Wallace Beery.

Two of her films would be remade. Somewhere in Sonora (1927) was remade into a film of the same name in 1932, starring John Wayne. The Land Beyond the Law (1927) was remade twice: the first time in 1932, under the title The Big Stampede, once more starring Wayne; and again in 1937, this time as Land Beyond the Law. Jackson died on November 28, 1962, at the age of 82 in Los Angeles, California.

== Filmography ==
(Per AFI database)

- North of Nevada (1924)
- A Boy of Flanders (1924)
- Broken Laws (1924)
- The Dangerous Coward (1924)
- The Fighting Sap (1924)
- Galloping Gallagher (1924)
- The Hill Billy (1924)
- Thundering Hoofs (1924)
- Lightning Romance (1924)
- The Mask of Lopez (1924)
- The Silent Stranger (1924)
- Thundering Hoofs (1924)
- The Wild Bull's Lair (1925)
- The Bandit's Baby (1925)
- Easy Money (1925)
- Ridin' the Wind (1925)
- Mike (1926)
- Satan Town (1926)
- Senor Daredevil (1926)
- The Unknown Cavalier (1926)
- The Devil's Saddle (1927)
- The Overland Stage (1927)
- The Red Raiders (1927)
- Arizona Bound (1927)
- Gun Gospel (1927)
- The Land Beyond the Law (1927)
- Men of Daring (1927)
- Somewhere in Sonora (1927)
- The Canyon of Adventure (1928)
- The Glorious Trail (1928)
- The Shepherd of the Hills (1928)
- The Upland Rider (1928)
- The California Mail (1929)
- Cheyenne (1929)
- The Wagon Master (1929)
- Lucky Larkin (1930)
- Min and Bill (1930)
- La fruta amarga (1931)
- Wild Girl (1932)
- Carnival Boat (1932)
- Born to Fight (1932)
- The Return of the Cisco Kid (1939)
