= Bob Reeves (actor) =

American actor

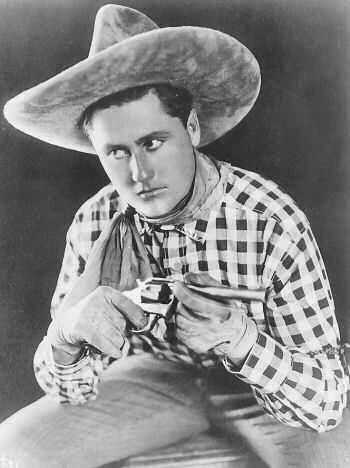
- Reeves c. 1919
- Born: January 28, 1892; Marlin, Texas, U.S.
- Died: April 12, 1960 (aged 68); Los Angeles, California, U.S.
- Occupation: Actor
- Years active: 1919–1959
- Spouse: Mary Turner

Robert Reeves (January 28, 1892 – April 12, 1960) was an American Western movie actor.

== Early years ==
Robert Jasper Reeves was born in Marlin, Texas, the son of George Patton Reeves and Frances Luella Garrett, in 1892. He attended Marlin High School and Texas A&M University. During World War I he served in the United States Army in the Coast Artillery in California, and was discharged in December, 1918.

== Career ==
Reeves won championships in rodeo competition and worked as a stunt double for Universal Pictures before he became an actor. His film career began as early as 1919, when he starred in an 18-chapter serial, The Great Radium Mystery. He appeared in a number of silent films and sixteen sound films. In 1921 he was teamed with Marion Aye in a series of 18 Cactus Features directed by Albert S. Rogell. He worked through the 1940s and 1950s, including an appearance as an extra in Miracle on 34th Street in 1947. In the 1950s he appeared in television westerns including episodes of Maverick, Sugarfoot, Cheyenne, and Wyatt Earp. In 1959 he appeared in an uncredited role as a townsman on the television show Lawman ("The Gang"). His last known appearance was in the film Rio Bravo in 1959.

== Personal life and death ==
Reeves was married to Mary Lee Turner; the couple had no children but Mary had two daughters from a previous marriage. Reeves died of a heart attack in Los Angeles in 1960. He is buried in Valhalla Memorial Park Cemetery in North Hollywood, California.

== Selected filmography ==
- The Great Radium Mystery (Universal, 1919)
- Elmo the Mighty (Universal, 1919)
- The Flaming Disc (Universal, 1920) - 18-part serial
- The Thrill Chaser (Hoot Gibson Productions, 1923)
- The Mask of Lopez (FBO, 1924)
- Galloping Gallagher (FBO, 1924)
- The No-Gun Man (Harry Garson Productions, 1924)
- The Silent Stranger ( Harry J. Brown Productions, 1924)
- Fighting Luck (Anchor, 1925)
- Ambushed (Anchor, 1926)
- Cyclone Bob (Anchor, 1926)
- A Desperate Chance (Anchor, 1926)
- Heart Trouble (Harry Langdon, 1928)
- Fighting Luck (Anchor, 1926)
- The Iron Fist (Anchor, 1926)
- Riding Straight (Anchor, 1926)
- Riding for Life (Anchor, 1926)
- Underworld (Paramount, 1927)
- The Cherokee Kid (FBO, 1927)
- The Lightning Express (Universal, 1930)
- Canyon Hawks (National Players, 1930)
- The Lonesome Trail (G.A. Durlam Productions, 1930)
- The Man Trailer (Columbia, 1934)
- Roaring Dan (Universal, 1939)
- Days of Old Cheyenne (Republic, 1943)
- Galloping Thunder (Columbia, 1946)
- Buckaroo Sheriff of Texas (Republic, 1951)
- The Lusty Men (1952)
- Captive of Billy the Kid (Republic 1952)
- Shadows of Tombstone (Republic, 1953)
- Hell's Crossroads (Republic, 1957)
