= The Man Trailer =

1934 film

- Directed by: Lambert Hillyer
- Written by: Lambert Hillyer
- Produced by: Irving Briskin
- Starring: Buck Jones; Cecilia Parker
- Cinematography: Benjamin H. Kline
- Edited by: Gene Milford
- Production company: Columbia Pictures
- Distributed by: Columbia Pictures
- Release date: March 24, 1934
- Running time: 59 minutes
- Country: United States
- Language: English

The Man Trailer is a 1934 American pre-Code western film directed by Lambert Hillyer and starring Buck Jones and Cecilia Parker. It was a remake of the 1930 film The Lone Rider which had also starred Jones. It was shot at the Iverson Ranch.

== Cast ==
- Buck Jones as Track Ames aka Dan Lane (as Charles 'Buck' Jones)
- Cecilia Parker as Sally Ryan (as Cecelia Parker)
- Arthur Vinton as Jim Burke
- Clarence Geldert as Sheriff John Ryan
- Steve Clark as Sheriff Dave Bishop
- Charles West as Gorman
- Tom B. Forman as Henchman (as Tom Forman)
- Lew Meehan as Henchman Pete
- Silver Tip Baker as Townsman
- Dick Botiller as Henchman Keno
- Charles Brinley as Deputy Charlie Lathrup
- Buck Bucko as Henchman
- Roy Bucko as Henchman Curly
- George Chesebro as Expressman
- Tommy Coats as Deputy
- Rube Dalroy as Townsman
- Bud McClure as Henchman
- Artie Ortego as Deputy
- Bob Reeves as Deputy
- Jack Rockwell as Henchman
- Francis Walker as Deputy

== Bibliography ==
- Fetrow, Alan G. . Sound films, 1927-1939: a United States Filmography. McFarland, 1992.
- Pitts, Michael R. Western Movies: A Guide to 5,105 Feature Films. McFarland, 2012.
