= Charles Crockett =

American actor (1870–1934)

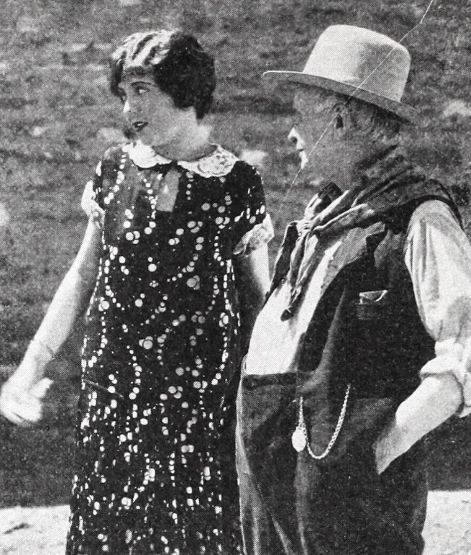
- Lois Wilson and Charles Crockett in The Vanishing American (1925)
- Born: December 29, 1870; Baltimore, Maryland, U.S.
- Died: June 12, 1934 (aged 63); Los Angeles, California
- Occupation: Actor
- Years active: 1927–1934

Charles Crockett (December 29, 1870 – June 12, 1934) was an American character actor known for his roles in films such as Guilty Hands, The Gingham Girl, and The Princess from Hoboken.

Born in Baltimore, Maryland, on December 29, 1870, Crockett appeared in stage productions before becoming a film actor. During his career, he acted in four Western films, two comedy films, and two historical films.

Calling him "a well-known character actor", The Cincinnati Post said, "In addition to being an actor of repute, Crockett is known in studioland as 'Hollywood's Will Rogers', so famous have his many humorous after-dinner speeches become in every quarter of the studio city." Rotten Tomatoes said he "had a successful Hollywood career". The Bulletin, a publication of the American Academy of Arts and Sciences, stated Crockett was "the well known character actor of Hollywood", while The Sacramento Bee called him a "screen luminary". Crockett died on June 12, 1934, in Los Angeles, California.

== Filmography ==
Crockett was cast in these films:

- The Millionaire Cowboy as Granville Truce
- Sundown as Joe Patton
- The Dressmaker from Paris as Mayor
- Daddy's Gone A-Hunting as Mr. Smith
- Winds of Chance as Jerry
- The Vanishing American as Amos Halliday
- Into Her Kingdom as Senov
- The Collegians as Dean Maxwell
- Benson at Calford as Dean Maxwell
- Fighting to Win as Dean Maxwell
- Making Good as Dean Maxwell
- The Last Lap as Dean Maxwell
- The Princess from Hoboken as Whiskers
- Arizona Bound as John Winslow
- The Gingham Girl as Pat O'Day
- Running Wild (1927) as Dean Maxwell
- Cross Country Run as Dean Maxwell
- Abraham Lincoln (1930) as Sheriff
- Ex-Flame (1930) as Parson
- Guilty Hands (1931) as H.G. Smith
- You Can't Buy Everything (1934) as Committee Man
- The Cat and the Fiddle (1934) as Rudy's Secretary
