= The Silent Stranger (1924 film) =

1924 film directed by Albert S. Rogell

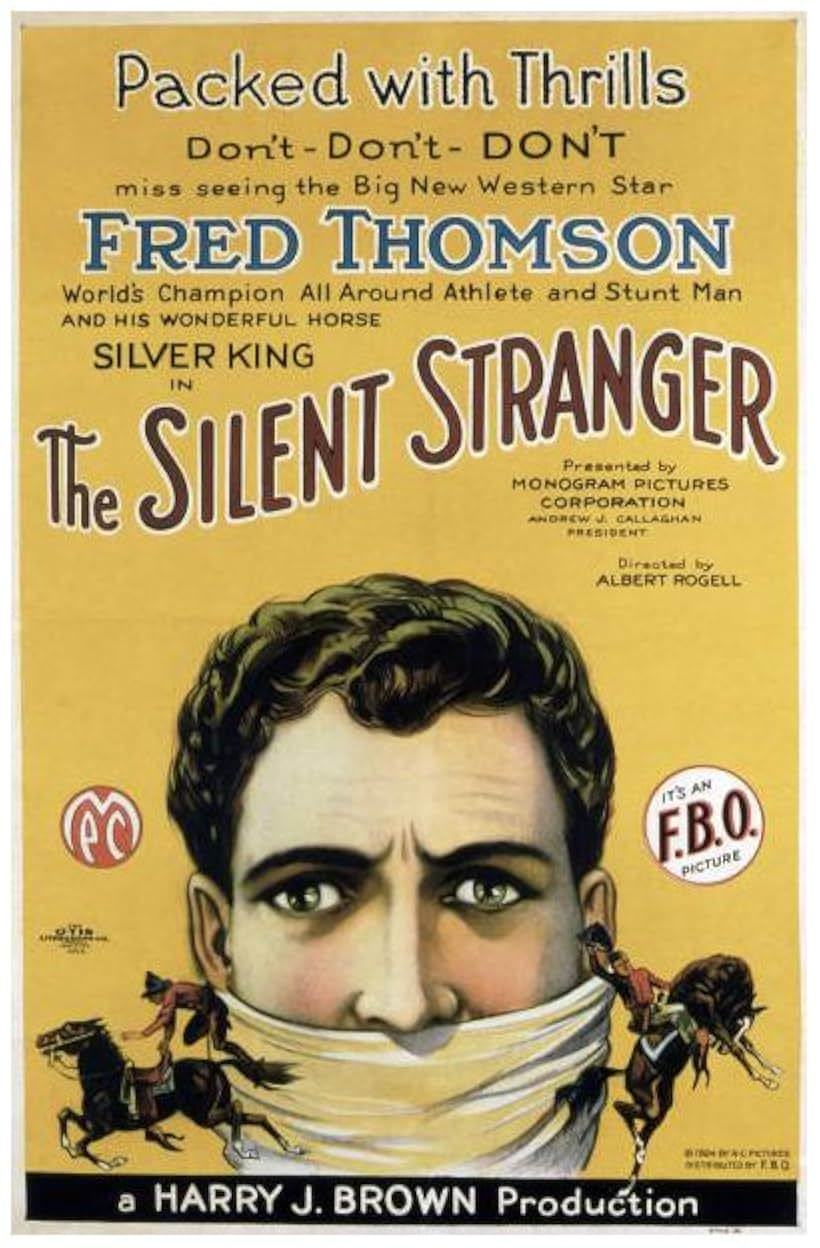
- Poster
- Directed by: Albert S. Rogell
- Written by: Marion Jackson; Stuart Heisler
- Produced by: Harry Joe Brown
- Starring: Fred Thomson; Hazel Keener; Frank Hagney
- Cinematography: Ross Fisher
- Production company: Film Booking Offices of America
- Distributed by: Film Booking Offices of America
- Release date: April 21, 1924
- Running time: 50 minutes
- Country: United States
- Language: Silent (English intertitles)

The Silent Stranger is a 1924 American silent Western film directed by Albert S. Rogell and starring Fred Thomson, Hazel Keener, and Frank Hagney.

== Plot ==
As described in a film magazine review, Jack Taylor, a supposed deaf-mute, arrives in Valley City snooping about in apparently aimless fashion, thereby winning recognition among the townspeople as "The Silent Stranger." Mail thefts have occurred and Dad Warner, postmaster, is threatened with discharge. Taylor suspects Sleeman, Warner's clerk, as being behind the thefts. Taylor is captured by the gang, escapes, stops another robbery, and saves Warner's daughter Lillian from the bandits. Taylor, who is really a United States Secret Service man charged with ending the mail thefts, brings about the arrest of the gang and wins the affection of the young woman.

== Cast ==
- Fred Thomson as Jack Taylor
- Hazel Keener as Lillian Warner
- George B. Williams as 'Dad' Warner, Postmaster
- Richard Headrick as Laddie Warner
- Frank Hagney as Dick Blackwell
- Horace B. Carpenter as Sheriff Sam Hull
- Bud Osborne as Law Sleeman, Postal Clerk
- Bob Reeves as Deputy Sheriff 'Shorty' Turner
- George Nichols as Silas Horton, Banker

== Bibliography ==
- Donald W. McCaffrey & Christopher P. Jacobs. Guide to the Silent Years of American Cinema. Greenwood Publishing, 1999. ISBN 0-313-30345-2
