= The Gingham Girl =

1927 film

- Directed by: David Kirkland
- Screenplay by: David Kirkland; Rex Taylor; Ewart Adamson
- Based on: The Gingham Girl by Daniel Kusell
- Starring: Lois Wilson; George K. Arthur; Charles Crockett; Hazel Keener; Myrta Bonillas; Jerry Miley
- Cinematography: Jules Cronjager
- Production company: Robertson-Cole Pictures Corporation
- Distributed by: Film Booking Offices of America
- Release date: July 16, 1927
- Running time: 70 minutes
- Country: United States
- Language: English

The Gingham Girl is a 1927 American silent comedy film directed by David Kirkland and written by David Kirkland, Rex Taylor and Ewart Adamson. It is based on the 1922 play The Gingham Girl by Daniel Kusell. The film stars Lois Wilson, George K. Arthur, Charles Crockett, Hazel Keener, Myrta Bonillas and Jerry Miley. The film was released on July 16, 1927, by Film Booking Offices of America.

== Cast ==
- Lois Wilson as Mary Thompson
- George K. Arthur as Johnny Cousins
- Charles Crockett as Pat O'Day
- Hazel Keener as Letty O'Day
- Myrta Bonillas as Sonia Mason
- Jerry Miley as Harrison Bartlett
- Betty Francisco as Mazie Le Lewer
- Derelys Perdue as Mildred Ripley
- Jed Prouty as Hayden
- Maude Fulton as Mrs. Trask

== Preservation ==
A copy is preserved at Cinematheque Royale de Belgique, Brussels.
