= Hazel Keener =

American actress

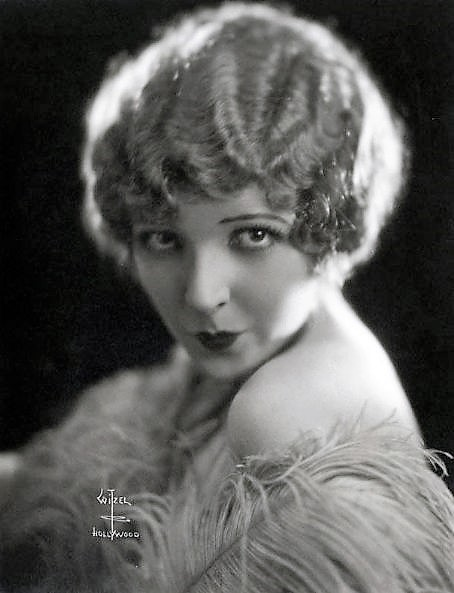
- Keener in 1925
- Born: Hazel Ona Keener; October 22, 1904; Fairbury, Illinois, U.S.
- Died: August 7, 1979 (aged 74); Pacific Grove, California, U.S.
- Other name: Barbara Worth
- Occupation: Actress
- Years active: 1922–1956

Hazel Ona Keener (October 22, 1904 – August 7, 1979) was a motion picture actress, primarily in silent films, during the 1920s.

== Early life and career ==
Born in Fairbury, Illinois and raised in Davenport, Iowa, Keenan attended Lincoln School.

Keener won a national beauty contest sponsored by the Chicago Tribune and used her success to begin her film career. In 1923, Keener was selected as "Miss Hollywood" at the annual musical comedy fete put on by Hollywood artists. As tribute to Miss Keener's beauty, her bust was sculpted by sculptor Finn Haaken Frolich for the Norse club. She was a 1924 WAMPAS Baby Star.

Her acting career ran from 1922 through 1956. She also had roles in movies such as The Freshman (1925), The Gingham Girl (1927), Whispering Sage (1927), The Silent Partner (1927), and Vanishing Hoofs (1926).

In the 1930s, 1940s, and early 1950s, Keener had small parts in approximately twenty movies. She acted in television with roles in episodes of Judge Roy Bean (1956) and Hopalong Cassidy (1954).

== Partial filmography ==
- The Married Flapper (1922) as Muriel Vane
- An Old Sweetheart of Mine (1923) as Irene Ryan (credited as Barbara Worth)
- The Brass Bottle (1923)
- Tea–with a Kick! (1923)
- Galloping Gallagher (1924) as Evelyn Churchill
- North of Nevada (1924)
- The Silent Stranger (1924) as Lillian Warner
- The Mask of Lopez (1924) as Doris Hampton
- His Forgotten Wife (1924) as Irene Humphrey
- The Dangerous Coward (1924) as Hazel McGuinn
- The Fighting Sap (1924) as Marjorie Stoddard
- North of Nevada (1924) as Marion Ridgeway
- Empty Hands (1924) as Mrs. Endicott
- Hard Hittin' Hamilton (1924) as Mary Downing
- Ports of Call (1925) as Marjorie Vail
- Parisian Love (1925) as Margot
- The Freshman (1925) as College Belle
- Ten Days (1925) as Fay Whitney
- Range Buzzards (1925) as May
- Vanishing Hoofs (1926) as Edith Marsh
- One Hour of Love (1927) as Vi
- Whispering Sage (1927) as Mercedes' friend
- The First Night (1927) as Miss Leeds
- The Gingham Girl (1927) as Letty O'Day
- The Magnificent Flirt (1928)
- That Gang of Mine (1940) as Mrs. Wilkes
- Murder by Invitation (1941) as Mary Denham
