= Daddy's Gone A-Hunting (1925 film) =

1925 film

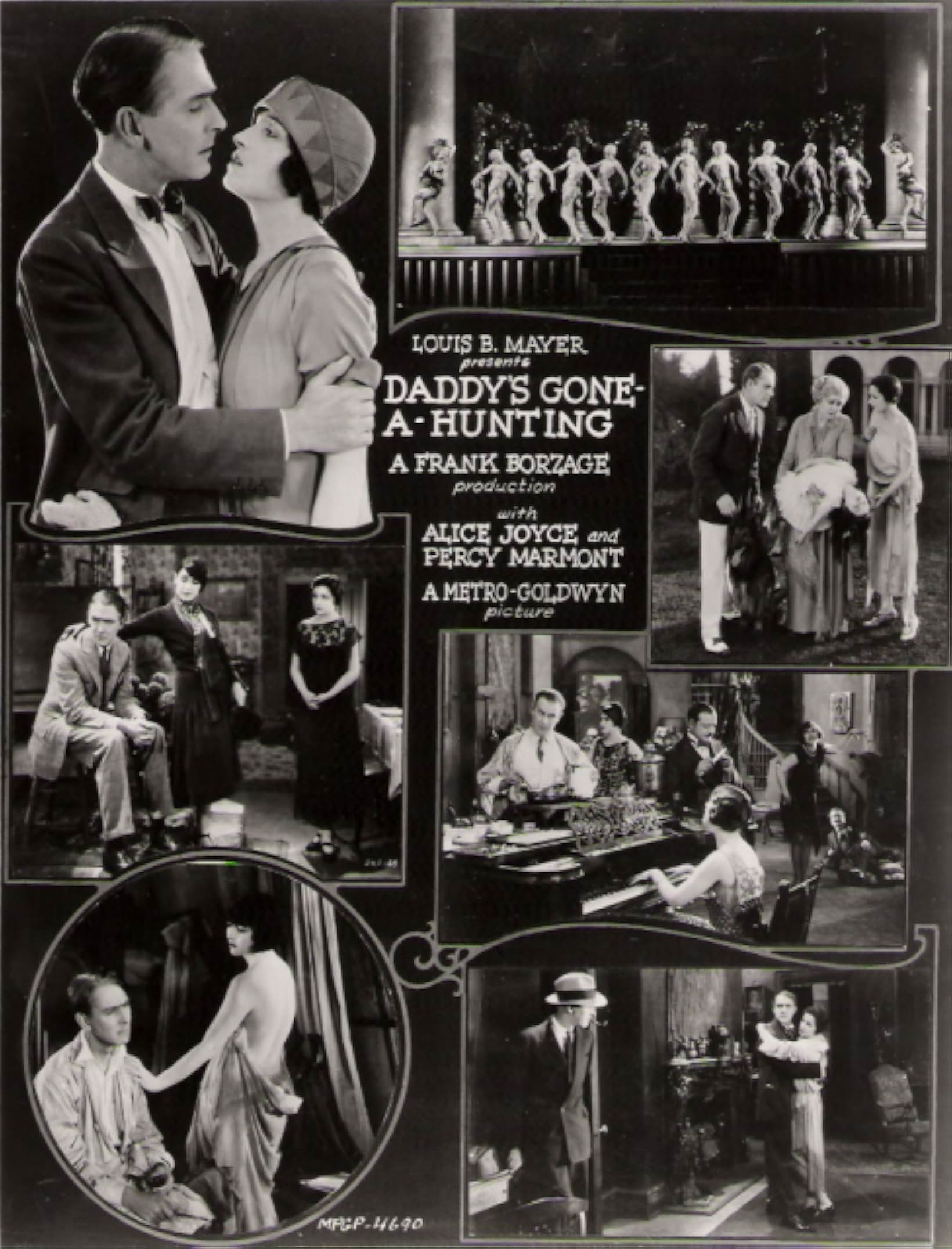
- Lobby card
- Directed by: Frank Borzage
- Written by: Kenneth B. Clarke
- Based on: Daddy's Gone A-Hunting; 1921 novel by Zoe Akins
- Produced by: Louis B. Mayer
- Starring: Alice Joyce; Percy Marmont
- Cinematography: Chester A. Lyons
- Edited by: Frank Sullivan
- Distributed by: Metro-Goldwyn-Mayer
- Release date: March 29, 1925
- Running time: 60 minutes
- Country: United States
- Language: Silent (English intertitles)

Daddy's Gone A-Hunting is a 1925 American silent drama film directed by Frank Borzage based upon a play by Zoë Akins, with adaptation by Kenneth B. Clarke. The film brought together Vitagraph leading lady Alice Joyce and English actor Percy Marmont after his success with If Winter Comes. This is the only film either of the main stars made for MGM. The film was remade in 1931 as Women Love Once. A print survives in the Národní filmový archiv.

== Plot ==
Julian is a poor artist who lives with wife Edith and their newborn baby in Harlem. Struggling to make ends meet, he foregoes his artistic calling and draws for magazines.

Reaching his limits, Julian convinces his wife he could reach higher grounds if he were to go to Paris. He moves to Paris while his Edith works at a shop on Fifth Avenue. Each of their lives evolves differently — Edith is courted by a wealthy suitor whom she ignores while pining for her husband, while Julian fails to meet his goals in Paris, returning defeated back to New York City three years later. Their child dies, and the meeting of Julian and Edith highlight how different their routes have been.

== Cast ==
- Alice Joyce as Edith
- Percy Marmont as Julian
- Virginia Marshall as Janet
- Helena D'Algy as Olga
- Ford Sterling as Oscar
- Holmes Herbert as Greenough
- Edythe Chapman as Mrs. Greenough
- James O. Barrows as Colonel Orth
- James T. Mack as Benson (credited as James MacElhern)
- Martha Mattox as Mrs. Wethers
- Charles Crockett as Mr. Smith
- Kate Toncray as Mrs. Smith
- Barbara Tennant as Extra (uncredited)
