= Land of Hunted Men =

1943 American western film

- Theatrical release poster
- Directed by: S. Roy Luby
- Written by: William L. Nolte (story); Elizabeth Beecher (screenplay)
- Produced by: Clark L. Paylow (associate producer); George W. Weeks (producer)
- Starring: See below
- Cinematography: James S. Brown Jr.
- Edited by: S. Roy Luby
- Distributed by: Monogram Pictures
- Release date: March 26, 1943
- Running time: 58 minutes
- Country: United States
- Language: English

Land of Hunted Men is a 1943 American Western film directed by S. Roy Luby. The film is the twenty-first in Monogram Pictures' "Range Busters" series and it stars Ray "Crash" Corrigan as Crash, Dennis Moore as Denny and Max Terhune as Alibi, with Phyllis Adair, Charles King and John Merton.

In the final four "Range Busters" movies, "Crash" Corrigan returned to the series, and starred alongside Dennis Moore and Max Terhune, replacing John "Dusty" King and "Davy" Sharpe.

== Plot ==
Range Buster Denny Moore is shot while trying to capture stagecoach robbers. He joins his fellow Range Busters, Crash and Alibi, and hides at a line shack owned by rancher "Dad" Oliver. As they investigate the robbers, they uncover a web of deceit involving businessman Faro Wilson and mine manager Pelham. With the help of their resourceful cook, Snowflake, the Range Busters expose the truth, defeat the outlaws, and bring them to justice, before riding off to their next adventure.

== Cast ==
- Ray Corrigan as "Crash" Corrigan
- Dennis Moore as Denny Moore
- Max Terhune as "Alibi" Terhune
- Elmer as Elmer, Alibi's Dummy
- Phyllis Adair as Dorrie Oliver
- Charles King as "Faro" Wilson
- John Merton as Pelham (Mine Manager)
- Ted Mapes as Henchman Piebald
- Frank McCarroll as Henchman Tabasco
- Forrest Taylor as "Dad" Oliver
- Steve Clark as Sheriff Andy Wallace
- Fred "Snowflake" Toones as Snowflake

== Soundtrack ==
- "Trail to Mexico" (Written by Johnny Lange and Lew Porter)

== See also ==
The Range Busters series:

- The Range Busters (1940)
- Trailing Double Trouble (1940)
- West of Pinto Basin (1940)
- Trail of the Silver Spurs (1941)
- The Kid's Last Ride (1941)
- Tumbledown Ranch in Arizona (1941)
- Wrangler's Roost (1941)
- Fugitive Valley (1941)
- Saddle Mountain Roundup (1941)
- Tonto Basin Outlaws (1941)
- Underground Rustlers (1941)
- Thunder River Feud (1942)
- Rock River Renegades (1942)
- Boot Hill Bandits (1942)
- Texas Trouble Shooters (1942)
- Arizona Stage Coach (1942)
- Texas to Bataan (1942)
- Trail Riders (1942)
- Two Fisted Justice (1943)
- Haunted Ranch (1943)
- Land of Hunted Men (1943)
- Cowboy Commandos (1943)
- Black Market Rustlers (1943)
- Bullets and Saddles (1943)
