= Texas to Bataan =

1942 film by Robert Emmett Tansey

- Directed by: Robert Emmett Tansey
- Written by: Arthur Hoerl
- Produced by: Dick Ross (associate producer); George W. Weeks (producer)
- Starring: See below
- Cinematography: Robert E. Cline
- Edited by: S. Roy Luby
- Music by: Frank Sanucci
- Distributed by: Monogram Pictures
- Release date: 16 October 1942
- Running time: 56 minutes
- Country: United States
- Language: English

Texas to Bataan is a 1942 American Western film directed by Robert Emmett Tansey. The film is the seventeenth in Monogram Pictures' "Range Busters" series, and it stars John "Dusty" King as Dusty, "Davy" Sharpe and Max "Alibi" Terhune, with Marjorie Manners, Steve Clark and Budd Buster.

This is the first in the series with "Davy" Sharpe taking the place of Ray "Crash" Corrigan as one of the leads.

The film is also known as The Long, Long Trail in the United Kingdom.

== Plot ==
Prior to the attack on Pearl Harbor, the U.S. Army buys some horses from the Range Busters' ranch for service in the Philippines. The cowboys tangle with Axis spies in both Texas and in the Philippines.

== Cast ==
- John 'Dusty' King as Dusty King
- David Sharpe as Davy Sharpe
- Max Terhune as Alibi Terhune
- Elmer as Elmer Sneezeweed - Alibi's dummy
- Marjorie Manners as Dallas Conroy
- Steve Clark as Tom Conroy
- Budd Buster as Tad Kelton
- E. Baucin as Cookie (the spy)
- Frank Ellis as Ken Richards (crooked rancher)
- Kenne Duncan as Army Captain Anders
- Guy Kingsford as Miller
- Carl Mathews as Truck henchman
- Tex Palmer as Truck henchman
- Tom Steele as Truck henchman
- Al Ferguson as Cafe henchman

== Soundtrack ==
- John "Dusty" King - "Me and My Pony" (Written by John "Dusty" King)
- John "Dusty" King - "Goodbye Old Paint" (Traditional)
- John "Dusty" King - "Home on the Range"

== See also ==
The Range Busters series:

- The Range Busters (1940)
- Trailing Double Trouble (1940)
- West of Pinto Basin (1940)
- Trail of the Silver Spurs (1941)
- The Kid's Last Ride (1941)
- Tumbledown Ranch in Arizona (1941)
- Wrangler's Roost (1941)
- Fugitive Valley (1941)
- Saddle Mountain Roundup (1941)
- Tonto Basin Outlaws (1941)
- Underground Rustlers (1941)
- Thunder River Feud (1942)
- Rock River Renegades (1942)
- Boot Hill Bandits (1942)
- Texas Trouble Shooters (1942)
- Arizona Stage Coach (1942)
- Texas to Bataan (1942)
- Trail Riders (1942)
- Two Fisted Justice (1943)
- Haunted Ranch (1943)
- Land of Hunted Men (1943)
- Cowboy Commandos (1943)
- Black Market Rustlers (1943)
- Bullets and Saddles (1943)
