= Arizona Stage Coach =

1942 film

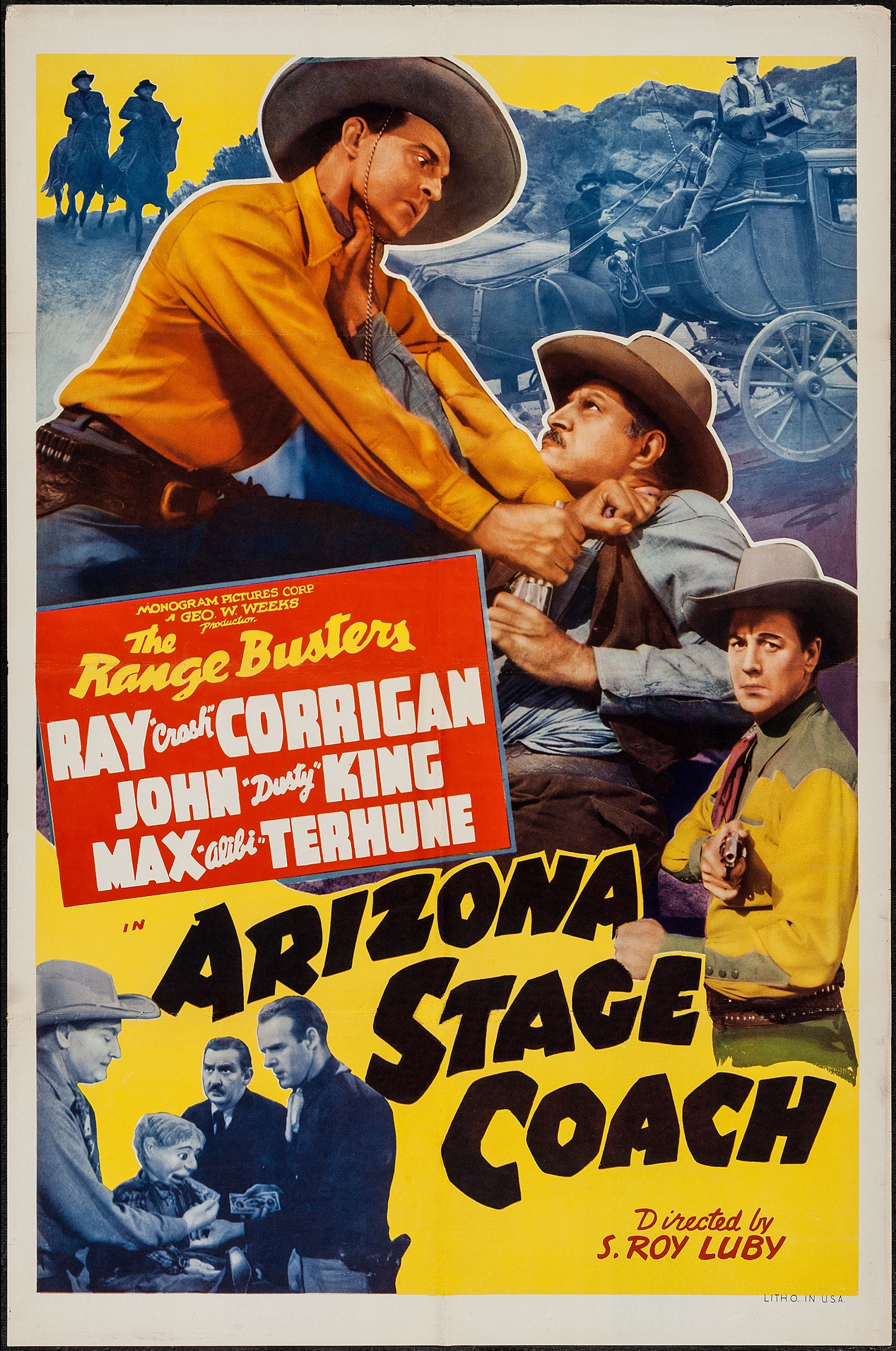
- Theatrical release poster
- Directed by: S. Roy Luby
- Written by: Oliver Drake (story); Arthur Hoerl (adaptation)
- Produced by: Dick Ross (associate producer); Anna Bell Weeks (associate producer); George W. Weeks (producer)
- Starring: See below
- Cinematography: Robert E. Cline
- Edited by: S. Roy Luby
- Music by: Frank Sanucci
- Distributed by: Monogram Pictures
- Release date: 4 September 1942
- Running time: 58 minutes
- Country: United States
- Language: English

Arizona Stage Coach is a 1942 American Western film directed by S. Roy Luby. The film is the sixteenth in Monogram Pictures' "Range Busters" series, and it stars Ray "Crash" Corrigan as Crash, John "Dusty" King as Dusty and Max "Alibi" Terhune as Alibi, with Nell O'Day, Charles King and Riley Hill.

This is the last film in the series with the original main cast; in the next film, Texas to Bataan, "Davy" Sharpe replaces "Crash" Corrigan.

== Plot ==
The Range Busters take on a gang of stagecoach robbers who are operating with the assistance of crooked employees of Wells Fargo.

== Cast ==
- Ray Corrigan as Crash Corrigan
- John 'Dusty' King as Dusty King
- Max Terhune as Alibi Terhune
- Elmer as Elmer, Alibi's dummy
- Nell O'Day as Dorrie Willard
- Charles King as Tim Douglas
- Riley Hill as Ernie Willard
- Kermit Maynard as Henchman Strike Cardigan
- Carl Mathews as Henchman Ace
- Slim Whitaker as Henchman Red
- Slim Harkey as Henchman
- Steve Clark as Jake – Stage Driver-Henchman
- Frank Ellis as Dan – Stage Shotgun-Guard / Henchman
- Jack Ingram as Sheriff Denver
- Stanley Price as Tex Laughlin – Hold-Up Man
- Forrest Taylor as Uncle Larry Meadows

== Soundtrack ==
- John "Dusty" King – "Red River Valley" (Music by James Kerrigen)
- John "Dusty" King – "Where The Grass Grows Greener in the Valley" (Music by Rudy Sooter)

== See also ==
The Range Busters series:

- The Range Busters (1940)
- Trailing Double Trouble (1940)
- West of Pinto Basin (1940)
- Trail of the Silver Spurs (1941)
- The Kid's Last Ride (1941)
- Tumbledown Ranch in Arizona (1941)
- Wrangler's Roost (1941)
- Fugitive Valley (1941)
- Saddle Mountain Roundup (1941)
- Tonto Basin Outlaws (1941)
- Underground Rustlers (1941)
- Thunder River Feud (1942)
- Rock River Renegades (1942)
- Boot Hill Bandits (1942)
- Texas Trouble Shooters (1942)
- Arizona Stage Coach (1942)
- Texas to Bataan (1942)
- Trail Riders (1942)
- Two Fisted Justice (1943)
- Haunted Ranch (1943)
- Land of Hunted Men (1943)
- Cowboy Commandos (1943)
- Black Market Rustlers (1943)
- Bullets and Saddles (1943)
