= Haunted Ranch =

1943 film by Robert Emmett Tansey

- Film poster
- Directed by: Robert Emmett Tansey
- Written by: Arthur Hoerl (original story); Elizabeth Beecher (screenplay)
- Produced by: George W. Weeks (producer)
- Starring: Dave Sharpe
- Cinematography: Robert E. Cline
- Edited by: S. Roy Luby
- Music by: Frank Sanucci
- Release date: February 19, 1943
- Running time: 57 minutes
- Country: United States
- Language: English

Haunted Ranch is a 1943 American Western film directed by Robert Emmett Tansey. The film is the twentieth in Monogram Pictures' "Range Busters" series, and it stars John "Dusty" King as Dusty, "Davy" Sharpe and Max "Alibi" Terhune, with Rex Lease, Julie Duncan and Glenn Strange.

== Cast ==
- John "Dusty" King as "Dusty" King
- Dave Sharpe as Davy Sharpe
- Max Terhune as Alibi Terhune
- Elmer as Elmer - Alibi's Dummy
- Julie Duncan as Helen Weston
- Glenn Strange as Rance Austin
- Charles King as Henchman Chuck
- Bud Osborne as Henchman Ed
- Rex Lease as Deputy Rex Lease
- Fred "Snowflake" Toones as Sam
- Budd Buster as Sheriff
- Tex Palmer as Henchman Danny
- Steve Clark as Marshal Hammond

== Soundtrack ==
- John "Dusty" King - "Where the Prairie Hills Meet the Sky" (Words and Music by John "Dusty" King as John King)

== See also ==
The Range Busters series:

- The Range Busters (1940)
- Trailing Double Trouble (1940)
- West of Pinto Basin (1940)
- Trail of the Silver Spurs (1941)
- The Kid's Last Ride (1941)
- Tumbledown Ranch in Arizona (1941)
- Wrangler's Roost (1941)
- Fugitive Valley (1941)
- Saddle Mountain Roundup (1941)
- Tonto Basin Outlaws (1941)
- Underground Rustlers (1941)
- Thunder River Feud (1942)
- Rock River Renegades (1942)
- Boot Hill Bandits (1942)
- Texas Trouble Shooters (1942)
- Arizona Stage Coach (1942)
- Texas to Bataan (1942)
- Trail Riders (1942)
- Two Fisted Justice (1943)
- Haunted Ranch (1943)
- Land of Hunted Men (1943)
- Cowboy Commandos (1943)
- Black Market Rustlers (1943)
- Bullets and Saddles (1943)
