= Trail Riders =

1942 film by Robert Emmett Tansey

- Theatrical release poster
- Directed by: Robert Emmett Tansey
- Written by: Frances Kavanaugh (screenplay); Robert Emmett Tansey (story)
- Produced by: Anna Bell Ward (associate producer); George W. Weeks (producer)
- Starring: See below
- Cinematography: Robert E. Cline
- Edited by: S. Roy Luby
- Music by: Frank Sanucci
- Distributed by: Monogram Pictures
- Release date: December 4, 1942
- Running time: 55 minutes
- Country: United States
- Language: English

Trail Riders is a 1942 American Western film directed by Robert Emmett Tansey. The film is the eighteenth in Monogram Pictures' "Range Busters" series, and it stars John "Dusty" King as Dusty, "Davy" Sharpe and Max "Alibi" Terhune, with Evelyn Finley, Forrest Taylor and Charles King.

The film is also known as Dead Men Don't Ride (American pre-release title).

== Cast ==
- John Dusty King as Dusty King
- David Sharpe as Davy Sharpe
- Max Terhune as Alibi Terhune
- Elmer as Elmer, Alibi's Dummy
- Evelyn Finley as Mary Rand
- Forrest Taylor as Mike Rand
- Charles King as Ed Cole
- Kermit Maynard as Henchman Ace Alton
- Lynton Brent as Jeff Rand
- Jack Curtis as Ranch Hand Tiny
- Steve Clark as Marshal Jim Hammond
- Kenne Duncan as Marshal Frank Hammond

== Release ==
Trail Riders was rated Class A-1, unobjectionable for general patronage, by the National Legion of Decency.

== Reception ==
Motion Picture Daily gave Trail Riders a negative review, calling the film "completely routine" and describing the direction as "uninspired." The reviewer praised John King, David Sharpe, Mickey Harrison, and Max Terhune's performances for being "dependable," but found the rest of the cast to be "stereotyped." A screening of the film drew laughter from the audience "that was not intended in the script."

== See also ==
The Range Busters series:

- The Range Busters (1940)
- Trailing Double Trouble (1940)
- West of Pinto Basin (1940)
- Trail of the Silver Spurs (1941)
- The Kid's Last Ride (1941)
- Tumbledown Ranch in Arizona (1941)
- Wrangler's Roost (1941)
- Fugitive Valley (1941)
- Saddle Mountain Roundup (1941)
- Tonto Basin Outlaws (1941)
- Underground Rustlers (1941)
- Thunder River Feud (1942)
- Rock River Renegades (1942)
- Boot Hill Bandits (1942)
- Texas Trouble Shooters (1942)
- Arizona Stage Coach (1942)
- Texas to Bataan (1942)
- Trail Riders (1942)
- Two Fisted Justice (1943)
- Haunted Ranch (1943)
- Land of Hunted Men (1943)
- Cowboy Commandos (1943)
- Black Market Rustlers (1943)
- Bullets and Saddles (1943)
