= Underground Rustlers =

1941 film by S. Roy Luby

- Directed by: S. Roy Luby
- Written by: John Rathmell (story "Bullets and Bullion"); Ted Tuttle (screenplay); Elizabeth Beecher (screenplay); John Vlahos (adaptation)
- Produced by: Anna Bell Ward (associate producer); George W. Weeks (producer)
- Starring: Ray "Crash" Corrigan; John "Dusty" King; Max Terhune
- Cinematography: Robert E. Cline
- Edited by: S. Roy Luby
- Production company: Monogram Pictures
- Distributed by: Monogram Pictures
- Release date: November 21, 1941
- Running time: 57 minutes
- Country: United States
- Language: English

Underground Rustlers is a 1941 American Western film directed by S. Roy Luby. The film is the eleventh in Monogram Pictures' "Range Busters" series, and it stars Ray "Crash" Corrigan as Crash, John "Dusty" King as Dusty and Max "Alibi" Terhune as Alibi, with Gwen Gaze, Robert Blair and Forrest Taylor. It is also known as Bullets and Bullion (US review title).

== Cast ==
- Ray Corrigan as "Crash" Corrigan
- John "Dusty" King as "Dusty" King
- Max Terhune as "Alibi" Terhune
- Elmer as Elmer, Alibi's Dummy
- Gwen Gaze as Irene Bently
- Robert Blair as Martin Ford
- Forrest Taylor as Jim Bently
- Tom London as Henchman Tom Harris
- Steve Clark as Henchman Jake Smith
- Bud Osborne as Sheriff

== Soundtrack ==
- John "Dusty" King "Following the Trail" (Written by Jean George)
- John "Dusty" King - "Sweetheart of the Range" (Written by Harry Tobias, Roy Ingraham and Mickey Ford)

== See also ==
The Range Busters series:

- The Range Busters (1940)
- Trailing Double Trouble (1940)
- West of Pinto Basin (1940)
- Trail of the Silver Spurs (1941)
- The Kid's Last Ride (1941)
- Tumbledown Ranch in Arizona (1941)
- Wrangler's Roost (1941)
- Fugitive Valley (1941)
- Saddle Mountain Roundup (1941)
- Tonto Basin Outlaws (1941)
- Underground Rustlers (1941)
- Thunder River Feud (1942)
- Rock River Renegades (1942)
- Boot Hill Bandits (1942)
- Texas Trouble Shooters (1942)
- Arizona Stage Coach (1942)
- Texas to Bataan (1942)
- Trail Riders (1942)
- Two Fisted Justice (1943)
- Haunted Ranch (1943)
- Land of Hunted Men (1943)
- Cowboy Commandos (1943)
- Black Market Rustlers (1943)
- Bullets and Saddles (1943)
