= Saddle Mountain Roundup =

1941 film by S. Roy Luby

- Theatrical release poster
- Directed by: S. Roy Luby
- Written by: William L. Nolte; Earle Snell; John Vlahos
- Produced by: Anna Bell Ward; George W. Weeks
- Starring: Ray "Crash" Corrigan; John "Dusty" King; Max Terhune
- Cinematography: Robert E. Cline
- Edited by: S. Roy Luby
- Production company: Monogram Pictures
- Distributed by: Monogram Pictures
- Release date: August 29, 1941
- Running time: 59 minutes
- Country: United States
- Language: English

Saddle Mountain Roundup is a 1941 American Western film directed by S. Roy Luby. The film is the ninth in Monogram Pictures' "Range Busters" series, and it stars Ray "Crash" Corrigan as Crash, John "Dusty" King as Dusty and Max "Alibi" Terhune as Alibi, with Lita Conway, Jack Mulhall and Willie Fung.

== Cast ==
- Ray Corrigan as Crash Corrigan
- John 'Dusty' King as Dusty King
- Max Terhune as Alibi Terhune
- Lita Conway as Nancy Henderson
- Jack Mulhall as Dan Freeman (lawyer)
- Willie Fung as Fang Way
- John Elliott as 'Magpie' Harper
- George Chesebro as Foreman Blackie Stone
- Jack Holmes as Sheriff
- Steve Clark as Jack Henderson
- Carl Mathews as Bill (henchman at shack)
- Elmer as Elmer, Alibi's Dummy
- Harold Goodman as Cousin Harold (singing / comic ranch hand)

== See also ==
The Range Busters series:

- The Range Busters (1940)
- Trailing Double Trouble (1940)
- West of Pinto Basin (1940)
- Trail of the Silver Spurs (1941)
- The Kid's Last Ride (1941)
- Tumbledown Ranch in Arizona (1941)
- Wrangler's Roost (1941)
- Fugitive Valley (1941)
- Saddle Mountain Roundup (1941)
- Tonto Basin Outlaws (1941)
- Underground Rustlers (1941)
- Thunder River Feud (1942)
- Rock River Renegades (1942)
- Boot Hill Bandits (1942)
- Texas Trouble Shooters (1942)
- Arizona Stage Coach (1942)
- Texas to Bataan (1942)
- Trail Riders (1942)
- Two Fisted Justice (1943)
- Haunted Ranch (1943)
- Land of Hunted Men (1943)
- Cowboy Commandos (1943)
- Black Market Rustlers (1943)
- Bullets and Saddles (1943)
