= Cowboy Commandos =

1943 film by S. Roy Luby

- Theatrical release poster
- Directed by: S. Roy Luby
- Screenplay by: Elizabeth Beecher
- Story by: Clark L. Paylow
- Produced by: George W. Weeks
- Starring: Ray "Crash" Corrigan; Dennis Moore; Max Terhune; Evelyn Finley; Johnny Bond; Budd Buster
- Cinematography: Edward A. Kull
- Edited by: S. Roy Luby
- Music by: Frank Sanucci
- Production company: Monogram Pictures
- Distributed by: Monogram Pictures
- Release date: June 4, 1943
- Running time: 53 minutes
- Country: United States
- Language: English

Cowboy Commandos is a 1943 American Western film directed by S. Roy Luby and written by Elizabeth Beecher. The film is the twenty-second in Monogram Pictures' "Range Busters" series, and it stars Ray "Crash" Corrigan as Dusty, Dennis Moore as Denny and Max Terhune as Alibi, with Evelyn Finley, Johnny Bond and Budd Buster. The film was released on June 4, 1943.

== Cast ==
- Ray "Crash" Corrigan as Crash Corrigan
- Dennis Moore as Denny Moore
- Max Terhune as Alibi Terhune
- Evelyn Finley as Joan Cameron
- Johnny Bond as Slim
- Budd Buster as William Werner
- John Merton as Larry Fraser
- Frank Ellis as Mario
- Steve Clark as Dan Bartlett
- Edna Bennett as Katie Werner
- Bud Osborne as Hans
- George Chesebro as Fred

== See also ==
The Range Busters series:

- The Range Busters (1940)
- Trailing Double Trouble (1940)
- West of Pinto Basin (1940)
- Trail of the Silver Spurs (1941)
- The Kid's Last Ride (1941)
- Tumbledown Ranch in Arizona (1941)
- Wrangler's Roost (1941)
- Fugitive Valley (1941)
- Saddle Mountain Roundup (1941)
- Tonto Basin Outlaws (1941)
- Underground Rustlers (1941)
- Thunder River Feud (1942)
- Rock River Renegades (1942)
- Boot Hill Bandits (1942)
- Texas Trouble Shooters (1942)
- Arizona Stage Coach (1942)
- Texas to Bataan (1942)
- Trail Riders (1942)
- Two Fisted Justice (1943)
- Haunted Ranch (1943)
- Land of Hunted Men (1943)
- Cowboy Commandos (1943)
- Black Market Rustlers (1943)
- Bullets and Saddles (1943)
