= Texas Trouble Shooters =

1942 film by S. Roy Luby

- Theatrical release poster
- Directed by: S. Roy Luby
- Screenplay by: Arthur Hoerl
- Story by: Elizabeth Beecher
- Produced by: George W. Weeks
- Starring: Ray "Crash" Corrigan; John 'Dusty' King; Max Terhune; Julie Duncan; Glenn Strange; Riley Hill
- Cinematography: Robert E. Cline
- Edited by: S. Roy Luby
- Music by: Frank Sanucci
- Production company: Monogram Pictures
- Distributed by: Monogram Pictures
- Release date: June 12, 1942
- Running time: 55 minutes
- Country: United States
- Language: English

Texas Trouble Shooters is a 1942 American Western film directed by S. Roy Luby and written by Arthur Hoerl. The film is the fifteenth in Monogram Pictures' "Range Busters" series, and it stars Ray "Crash" Corrigan as Crash, John "Dusty" King as Dusty and Max "Alibi" Terhune as Alibi, with Julie Duncan, Glenn Strange and Riley Hill. The film was released on June 12, 1942.

== Cast ==
- Ray "Crash" Corrigan as 'Crash' Corrigan
- John 'Dusty' King as 'Dusty' King
- Max Terhune as 'Alibi' Terhune
- Julie Duncan as Judy Wilson
- Glenn Strange as Roger Denby
- Riley Hill as Bret Travis
- Kermit Maynard as Pete
- Eddie Phillips as Wade Evans
- Frank Ellis as Duke
- Ted Mapes as Slim
- Gertrude Hoffmann as Granny Wilson
- Steve Clark as Bill Ames
- Jack Holmes as Perry

== See also ==
The Range Busters series:

- The Range Busters (1940)
- Trailing Double Trouble (1940)
- West of Pinto Basin (1940)
- Trail of the Silver Spurs (1941)
- The Kid's Last Ride (1941)
- Tumbledown Ranch in Arizona (1941)
- Wrangler's Roost (1941)
- Fugitive Valley (1941)
- Saddle Mountain Roundup (1941)
- Tonto Basin Outlaws (1941)
- Underground Rustlers (1941)
- Thunder River Feud (1942)
- Rock River Renegades (1942)
- Boot Hill Bandits (1942)
- Texas Trouble Shooters (1942)
- Arizona Stage Coach (1942)
- Texas to Bataan (1942)
- Trail Riders (1942)
- Two Fisted Justice (1943)
- Haunted Ranch (1943)
- Land of Hunted Men (1943)
- Cowboy Commandos (1943)
- Black Market Rustlers (1943)
- Bullets and Saddles (1943)
