= Wrangler's Roost =

1941 film by S. Roy Luby

- Theatrical release poster
- Directed by: S. Roy Luby
- Screenplay by: John Vlahos; Robert Finkle
- Story by: Earle Snell
- Produced by: George W. Weeks
- Starring: Ray "Crash" Corrigan; John 'Dusty' King; Max Terhune; Forrest Taylor; Gwen Gaze; George Chesebro
- Cinematography: Robert E. Cline
- Edited by: S. Roy Luby
- Production company: Monogram Pictures
- Distributed by: Monogram Pictures
- Release date: June 4, 1941
- Running time: 57 minutes
- Country: United States
- Language: English

Wrangler's Roost is a 1941 American Western film directed by S. Roy Luby and written by John Vlahos and Robert Finkle. The film is the seventh in Monogram Pictures' "Range Busters" series, and it stars Ray "Crash" Corrigan as Crash, John "Dusty" King as Dusty and Max "Alibi" Terhune as Alibi, with Forrest Taylor, Gwen Gaze and George Chesebro. The film was released on June 4, 1941, by Monogram Pictures.

== Plot ==
Black Bart, the notorious stagecoach robber, has reappeared after serving seven years in prison, so the Range Busters are sent to investigate. They find out that this Black Bart is an impostor, since the original Black Bart is now an honest citizen. Now they have to set a trap and get the impostor.

== Cast ==
- Ray "Crash" Corrigan as Crash Corrigan
- John 'Dusty' King as Dusty King
- Max Terhune as Alibi Terhune
- Forrest Taylor as Deacon Stewart
- Gwen Gaze as Molly Collins
- George Chesebro as Miller
- Frank Ellis as Bull
- Jack Holmes as Joe Collins
- Walter Shumway as Grover

== See also ==
The Range Busters series:

- The Range Busters (1940)
- Trailing Double Trouble (1940)
- West of Pinto Basin (1940)
- Trail of the Silver Spurs (1941)
- The Kid's Last Ride (1941)
- Tumbledown Ranch in Arizona (1941)
- Wrangler's Roost (1941)
- Fugitive Valley (1941)
- Saddle Mountain Roundup (1941)
- Tonto Basin Outlaws (1941)
- Underground Rustlers (1941)
- Thunder River Feud (1942)
- Rock River Renegades (1942)
- Boot Hill Bandits (1942)
- Texas Trouble Shooters (1942)
- Arizona Stage Coach (1942)
- Texas to Bataan (1942)
- Trail Riders (1942)
- Two Fisted Justice (1943)
- Haunted Ranch (1943)
- Land of Hunted Men (1943)
- Cowboy Commandos (1943)
- Black Market Rustlers (1943)
- Bullets and Saddles (1943)

== Bibliography ==
- Fetrow, Alan G. Feature Films, 1940-1949: a United States Filmography. McFarland, 1994.
