= Black Market Rustlers =

1943 film by S. Roy Luby

- Theatrical release poster
- Directed by: S. Roy Luby
- Screenplay by: Patricia Harper
- Produced by: George W. Weeks
- Starring: Ray "Crash" Corrigan; Dennis Moore; Max Terhune; Evelyn Finley; Steve Clark; Glenn Strange
- Cinematography: Edward A. Kull
- Edited by: S. Roy Luby
- Production company: Monogram Pictures
- Distributed by: Monogram Pictures
- Release date: August 27, 1943
- Running time: 54 minutes
- Country: United States
- Language: English

Black Market Rustlers is a 1943 American Western film directed by S. Roy Luby and written by Patricia Harper. The film is the twenty-third in Monogram Pictures' "Range Busters" series, and it stars Ray "Crash" Corrigan as Dusty, Dennis Moore as Denny and Max Terhune as Alibi, with Evelyn Finley, Steve Clark and Glenn Strange. The film was released on August 27, 1943.

== Plot ==
In this 23rd installment of Monogram's 24-film "Range Buster" series, ranchers near Winston face cattle theft for the black market by rustlers employing trailer trucks. The government dispatches Range Busters Crash, Denny, and Alibi to investigate. Crash stumbles upon the murdered federal agent who summoned him, accused by gang-member Slade and handed to Sheriff Harley. Denny joins Fred Prescott's daughter, Linda. Alibi persuades the sheriff of Crash's true identity, allowing him to work undercover in the jail. Alibi uncovers Corbin as the gang leader and exposes the truck used for cattle transportation. The trio conceal themselves in the truck, accompanying the gang on their next raid.

== Cast ==
- Ray "Crash" Corrigan as 'Crash' Corrigan
- Dennis Moore as Denny Moore
- Max Terhune as 'Alibi' Terhune
- Evelyn Finley as Linda Prescott
- Steve Clark as Prescott
- Glenn Strange as Corbin
- Carl Sepulveda as Sheriff Hanley
- George Chesebro as Slade
- Hank Worden as Slim
- Frank Ellis as Kyper
- John Merton as Parry
- Frosty Royce as Ed
- James Austin as Guitar Player
- Jean Austin as Yodeler
- Ingrid Austin as Accordion Player
- Art Fowler as Cowhand / Ukulele Player

== See also ==
The Range Busters series:

- The Range Busters (1940)
- Trailing Double Trouble (1940)
- West of Pinto Basin (1940)
- Trail of the Silver Spurs (1941)
- The Kid's Last Ride (1941)
- Tumbledown Ranch in Arizona (1941)
- Wrangler's Roost (1941)
- Fugitive Valley (1941)
- Saddle Mountain Roundup (1941)
- Tonto Basin Outlaws (1941)
- Underground Rustlers (1941)
- Thunder River Feud (1942)
- Rock River Renegades (1942)
- Boot Hill Bandits (1942)
- Texas Trouble Shooters (1942)
- Arizona Stage Coach (1942)
- Texas to Bataan (1942)
- Trail Riders (1942)
- Two Fisted Justice (1943)
- Haunted Ranch (1943)
- Land of Hunted Men (1943)
- Cowboy Commandos (1943)
- Black Market Rustlers (1943)
- Bullets and Saddles (1943)
