= Fugitive Valley =

1941 film by S. Roy Luby

- Directed by: S. Roy Luby
- Written by: Oliver Drake (story); Robert Finkle (writer); John Vlahos (writer)
- Produced by: Anna Bell Ward (associate producer); George W. Weeks (producer)
- Starring: Ray Corrigan; Max Terhune; Julie Duncan
- Cinematography: Robert E. Cline
- Edited by: S. Roy Luby
- Music by: Frank Sanucci
- Production company: Monogram Pictures
- Distributed by: Monogram Pictures
- Release date: July 30, 1941
- Running time: 61 minutes
- Country: United States
- Language: English

Fugitive Valley is a 1941 American Western film directed by S. Roy Luby. The film is the eighth in Monogram Pictures' "Range Busters" series, and it stars Ray "Crash" Corrigan as Crash, John "Dusty" King as Dusty and Max "Alibi" Terhune as Alibi, with Julie Duncan, Glenn Strange and Bob Kortman.

== Cast ==
- Ray Corrigan as Crash Corrigan
- John 'Dusty' King as Dusty King
- Max Terhune as Alibi Terhune
- Elmer as Elmer, Alibi's Dummy
- Julie Duncan as Ann Savage aka The Whip
- Glenn Strange as Gray
- Bob Kortman as Red Langdon
- Ed Brady as Dr. Steve
- Tom London as Marshal Warren
- Reed Howes as Jim Brandon
- Carl Mathews as Henchman Slick
- Edward Peil Sr. as Ed (jailer)
- Doye O'Dell as Jim - Whip rider

== See also ==
The Range Busters series:

- The Range Busters (1940)
- Trailing Double Trouble (1940)
- West of Pinto Basin (1940)
- Trail of the Silver Spurs (1941)
- The Kid's Last Ride (1941)
- Tumbledown Ranch in Arizona (1941)
- Wrangler's Roost (1941)
- Fugitive Valley (1941)
- Saddle Mountain Roundup (1941)
- Tonto Basin Outlaws (1941)
- Underground Rustlers (1941)
- Thunder River Feud (1942)
- Rock River Renegades (1942)
- Boot Hill Bandits (1942)
- Texas Trouble Shooters (1942)
- Arizona Stage Coach (1942)
- Texas to Bataan (1942)
- Trail Riders (1942)
- Two Fisted Justice (1943)
- Haunted Ranch (1943)
- Land of Hunted Men (1943)
- Cowboy Commandos (1943)
- Black Market Rustlers (1943)
- Bullets and Saddles (1943)
