= West of Pinto Basin =

- Directed by: S. Roy Luby
- Screenplay by: Earle Snell
- Story by: Elmer Clifton
- Produced by: George W. Weeks
- Starring: Ray "Crash" Corrigan; John 'Dusty' King; Max Terhune; Gwen Gaze; Tris Coffin; Dirk Thane
- Cinematography: Edward Linden
- Edited by: S. Roy Luby
- Production company: Monogram Pictures
- Distributed by: Monogram Pictures
- Release date: November 25, 1940
- Running time: 60 minutes
- Country: United States
- Language: English

West of Pinto Basin is a 1940 American Western film directed by S. Roy Luby and written by Earle Snell. The film is the third in Monogram Pictures' "Range Busters" series, and it stars Ray "Crash" Corrigan as Crash, John "Dusty" King as Dusty and Max "Alibi" Terhune as Alibi, with Gwen Gaze, Tris Coffin and Dirk Thane. The film was released on November 25, 1940, by Monogram Pictures.

== Cast ==
- Ray "Crash" Corrigan as 'Crash' Corrigan
- John 'Dusty' King as 'Dusty' King
- Max Terhune as Alibi
- Gwen Gaze as Joan Brown
- Tris Coffin as Harvey
- Dirk Thane as Hank Horton
- George Chesebro as Lane
- Carl Mathews as Joe
- Bud Osborne as Sheriff
- Jack Perrin as Ware
- Phil Dunham as Summers
- Budd Buster as Jeff
- Jerry Smith as Jerry Smith

== See also ==
The Range Busters series:

- The Range Busters (1940)
- Trailing Double Trouble (1940)
- West of Pinto Basin (1940)
- Trail of the Silver Spurs (1941)
- The Kid's Last Ride (1941)
- Tumbledown Ranch in Arizona (1941)
- Wrangler's Roost (1941)
- Fugitive Valley (1941)
- Saddle Mountain Roundup (1941)
- Tonto Basin Outlaws (1941)
- Underground Rustlers (1941)
- Thunder River Feud (1942)
- Rock River Renegades (1942)
- Boot Hill Bandits (1942)
- Texas Trouble Shooters (1942)
- Arizona Stage Coach (1942)
- Texas to Bataan (1942)
- Trail Riders (1942)
- Two Fisted Justice (1943)
- Haunted Ranch (1943)
- Land of Hunted Men (1943)
- Cowboy Commandos (1943)
- Black Market Rustlers (1943)
- Bullets and Saddles (1943)
