= The Range Busters =

1940 film

- Directed by: S. Roy Luby
- Screenplay by: John Rathmell
- Produced by: George W. Weeks
- Starring: Ray "Crash" Corrigan; John "Dusty" King; Max "Alibi" Terhune; Luana Walters; LeRoy Mason; Earle Hodgins
- Cinematography: Edward Linden
- Edited by: S. Roy Luby
- Production companies: Phoenix Productions, Inc.
- Distributed by: Monogram Pictures
- Release date: August 22, 1940
- Running time: 56 minutes
- Country: United States
- Language: English

The Range Busters is a 1940 American Western film directed by S. Roy Luby and written by John Rathmell. The film is the first in Monogram Pictures' "Range Busters" series, and it stars Ray "Crash" Corrigan as Crash, John "Dusty" King as Dusty and Max "Alibi" Terhune as Alibi, with Luana Walters, LeRoy Mason and Earle Hodgins. It was released on August 22, 1940.

The "Range Busters" series ran from 1940 to 1943 and encompassed 24 films, with the first 16 starring Corrigan, King and Terhune.

== Plot ==
The Circle T Ranch is terrorized by a series of murders, culminating in the death of the ranch owner, Homer Thorp. His daughter, Carol, is being pressured into selling the ranch by the villainous Torrence. The three Range Busters—Crash, Dusty and Alibi—ride into town and save Carol from the bully. She offers them a job on the ranch, and they learn from Carol's friend Doc Stengle that the ranch is cursed, haunted by a Phantom. Torrence's gang of gunrunners are hiding in an abandoned mine on the property, and the Range Busters are kept busy rounding up the gang and discovering the true identity of the mysterious Phantom.

== Cast ==
- Ray "Crash" Corrigan as "Crash" Corrigan
- John "Dusty" King as "Dusty" King
- Max "Alibi" Terhune as "Alibi" Terhune
- Luana Walters as Carol Thorp
- LeRoy Mason as Torrence
- Earle Hodgins as Uncle Rolf
- Frank LaRue as Doc Stengle
- Kermit Maynard as Wyoming
- Bruce King as Wall
- Carl Mathews as Henchman Rocky
- Horace Murphy as Homer Thorp

== Reception ==
Hal Erickson wrote on Allmovie.com, "The initial entry was as much a whodunit as a western, with the heroic triumvirate trying to ascertain the identity of The Phantom, a mysterious murderer. The revelation of the culprit will be a surprise to anyone who hasn't caught on to the clues planted in Reel One. Boasting good performances and well-chosen, unfamiliar outdoor locations, The Range Busters was an auspicious start to one of Monogram's most lucrative series."

== See also ==
The Range Busters series:

- The Range Busters (1940)
- Trailing Double Trouble (1940)
- West of Pinto Basin (1940)
- Trail of the Silver Spurs (1941)
- The Kid's Last Ride (1941)
- Tumbledown Ranch in Arizona (1941)
- Wrangler's Roost (1941)
- Fugitive Valley (1941)
- Saddle Mountain Roundup (1941)
- Tonto Basin Outlaws (1941)
- Underground Rustlers (1941)
- Thunder River Feud (1942)
- Rock River Renegades (1942)
- Boot Hill Bandits (1942)
- Texas Trouble Shooters (1942)
- Arizona Stage Coach (1942)
- Texas to Bataan (1942)
- Trail Riders (1942)
- Two Fisted Justice (1943)
- Haunted Ranch (1943)
- Land of Hunted Men (1943)
- Cowboy Commandos (1943)
- Black Market Rustlers (1943)
- Bullets and Saddles (1943)
