= Tonto Basin Outlaws =

1941 film by S. Roy Luby

- Theatrical release poster
- Directed by: S. Roy Luby
- Written by: Earle Snell; John Vlahos
- Produced by: George W. Weeks
- Starring: John "Dusty" King; Ray "Crash" Corrigan; Max Terhune
- Cinematography: Robert E. Cline
- Edited by: S. Roy Luby
- Music by: Frank Sanucci
- Production company: Monogram Pictures
- Distributed by: Monogram Pictures
- Release date: October 10, 1941
- Running time: 60 minutes
- Country: United States
- Language: English

Tonto Basin Outlaws is a 1941 American Western film directed by S. Roy Luby. The film is the tenth in Monogram Pictures' "Range Busters" series, and it stars Ray "Crash" Corrigan as Crash, John "Dusty" King as Dusty and Max "Alibi" Terhune as Alibi, with Jan Wiley, Tris Coffin and Edmund Cobb. Despite the film's title, the action takes place in Montana, not Arizona's Tonto Basin. Like the other of the Range Busters series, the film was shot at Corriganville Movie Ranch and used footage from silent Westerns.

== Plot ==
After the Sinking of the Maine, the Range Busters enlist in the Rough Riders to fight in the Spanish–American War. They are disappointed they are to be mustered out due to Crash's familiarity with Montana in order to protect cattle herds and gold shipments meant for the Army that are being attacked. Denver reporter Jane Blanchard sees her chance to cover the troubles in Montana when all the young male reporters are in Washington or en route to the war fronts. Working undercover in a Montana saloon owned by town boss Jeff Miller, Jane suspects first Crash, then Dusty of being one of the rustlers.

== Cast ==
- John "Dusty" King as "Dusty" King
- Ray "Crash" Corrigan as Ray "Chipmunk" Corrigan
- Max Terhune as "Alibi" Terhune
- Elmer Sneezeweed as Elmer Sneezeweed
- Jan Wiley as Jane Blanchard
- Tris Coffin as Jeff "Weasel" Miller
- Edmund Cobb as Jim Stark
- Art "Dustbowl" Fowler as Bill Brown
- Rex Lease as Editor Stanley
- Ted Mapes as Ricks
- Reed Howes as Army Captain
- Carl Mathews as Ed

== Soundtrack ==
- John "Dusty" King – "Cabin of My Dreams" (Words and Music by John "Dusty" King and Jean George)

== See also ==
The Range Busters series:

- The Range Busters (1940)
- Trailing Double Trouble (1940)
- West of Pinto Basin (1940)
- Trail of the Silver Spurs (1941)
- The Kid's Last Ride (1941)
- Tumbledown Ranch in Arizona (1941)
- Wrangler's Roost (1941)
- Fugitive Valley (1941)
- Saddle Mountain Roundup (1941)
- Tonto Basin Outlaws (1941)
- Underground Rustlers (1941)
- Thunder River Feud (1942)
- Rock River Renegades (1942)
- Boot Hill Bandits (1942)
- Texas Trouble Shooters (1942)
- Arizona Stage Coach (1942)
- Texas to Bataan (1942)
- Trail Riders (1942)
- Two Fisted Justice (1943)
- Haunted Ranch (1943)
- Land of Hunted Men (1943)
- Cowboy Commandos (1943)
- Black Market Rustlers (1943)
- Bullets and Saddles (1943)

== Bibliography ==
- Fetrow, Alan G. Feature Films, 1940-1949: a United States Filmography. McFarland, 1994.
