= Rock River Renegades =

1942 film by S. Roy Luby

- Directed by: S. Roy Luby
- Written by: Earle Snell (writer); Faith Thomas (story); John Vlahos (writer)
- Produced by: George W. Weeks (producer)
- Starring: See below
- Cinematography: Robert E. Cline
- Edited by: S. Roy Luby
- Music by: Frank Sanucci
- Distributed by: Monogram Pictures
- Release date: 27 February 1942
- Running time: 56 minutes
- Country: United States
- Language: English

Rock River Renegades is a 1942 American Western film directed by S. Roy Luby. The film is the thirteenth in Monogram Pictures' "Range Busters" series, and it stars Ray "Crash" Corrigan as Crash, John "Dusty" King as Dusty and Max "Alibi" Terhune as Alibi, with Christine McIntyre, John Elliott and Weldon Heyburn.

== Plot ==
Somewhere in Wyoming Territory, the office of the local newspaper, Rock River Advocate, and its editor and proprietor, Richard E. Ross, gets harassed by outlaws. Dick publicly denounces Sheriff Luke Graham, accuses him of complicity with several crimes, including bank robbery and murder perpetrated by the outlaws, and vow to replace him with his friend, real estate agent Jim Dawson. As he does this, Luke, who had been eavesdropping the discussion, enters to tell him about a letter from Dick's daughter, Grace, saying she would move from Kansas City, Missouri, to Rock River to help out her father's newspaper. Jim also reveals he received the same letter. Luke then send for two lawmen, Crash and Dusty, who are Range Busters, to travel to Rock River and clear his name from Dick's accusations while the third Range Buster, Alibi, refrains from leaving.

As Grace is traveling to Rock River, her stagecoach is attacked by bandits while its driver is wounded, but Crash and Dusty arrive on the scene, scare the outlaws off, and escort her to Wyoming. When they arrive, Luke is glad to reunited with the Range Busters, but Luke is skeptical of the two. As he visits the Advocate, Crash finds Alibi working there as a typesetter. He then learns from Alibi that Jim has been spreading misinformation about the Range Busters, convincing most people in the area that they are outlaws working with the Sheriff. Later, while in a saloon, Crash avoids an ambush by Jim's cohorts. As Alibi watches from his window, Jim successfully proposes to Grace. In response, the three Range Busters concoct a plan to delay the wedding, but are unsuccessful as Grace is undeterred.

After news of the stagecoach driver's death reaches Dick, he forms a vigilante committee with Jim as its leader to crush the outlaws. Meanwhile, Crash and Luke discover the outlaw's hideout, but get captured. As they are being moved by the bandits, Alibi saves them and they escape. After they return is Rock River, the Range Busters detain the Judge who is going to marry Grace and Jim. Jim then sends his gang, the outlaws, to their hideout to collect the loot. After Luke learns that Jim is a wanted criminal going under an alias, he tells Grace and Dick while Crash follows Jim to the outlaw's hideout. After a fight, the Range Busters capture Jim and the outlaws and discover that it took so long yo find them because their horse's shoes were applied backwards. In the closing scene, the Range Busters visit the carriage of newlyweds Grace and Luke and bid their farewells.

== Cast ==
- Ray Corrigan as Crash Corrigan
- John "Dusty" King as Dusty King
- Max Terhune as Alibi Terhune
- Elmer as Elmer, Alibi's Dummy
- Christine McIntyre as Grace Ross
- John Elliott as Dick Ross (editor, Rock River Advocate)
- Weldon Heyburn as Jim Dawson aka Phil Sanford
- Kermit Maynard as Marshal Luke Graham
- Frank Ellis as Chuck (stage robber)
- Carl Mathews as Joe (stage robber)
- Richard Cramer as Ed (bartender)
- Tex Palmer as Henchman Tex

== See also ==
The Range Busters series:

- The Range Busters (1940)
- Trailing Double Trouble (1940)
- West of Pinto Basin (1940)
- Trail of the Silver Spurs (1941)
- The Kid's Last Ride (1941)
- Tumbledown Ranch in Arizona (1941)
- Wrangler's Roost (1941)
- Fugitive Valley (1941)
- Saddle Mountain Roundup (1941)
- Tonto Basin Outlaws (1941)
- Underground Rustlers (1941)
- Thunder River Feud (1942)
- Rock River Renegades (1942)
- Boot Hill Bandits (1942)
- Texas Trouble Shooters (1942)
- Arizona Stage Coach (1942)
- Texas to Bataan (1942)
- Trail Riders (1942)
- Two Fisted Justice (1943)
- Haunted Ranch (1943)
- Land of Hunted Men (1943)
- Cowboy Commandos (1943)
- Black Market Rustlers (1943)
- Bullets and Saddles (1943)
