= Two Fisted Justice (1943 film) =

1943 film by Robert Emmett Tansey

- Directed by: Robert Emmett Tansey
- Written by: William L. Nolte
- Produced by: Anna Bell Ward; George W. Weeks
- Starring: John 'Dusty' King; David Sharpe; Max Terhune
- Cinematography: Robert E. Cline
- Edited by: S. Roy Luby
- Music by: Frank Sanucci
- Production company: Monogram Pictures
- Distributed by: Monogram Pictures
- Release date: January 8, 1943
- Running time: 54 minutes
- Country: United States
- Language: English

Two Fisted Justice is a 1943 American Western film directed by Robert Emmett Tansey. The film is the nineteenth in Monogram Pictures' "Range Busters" series, and it stars John "Dusty" King as Dusty, "Davy" Sharpe and Max "Alibi" Terhune, with Gwen Gaze, Joel Davis and John Elliott.

== Cast ==
- John 'Dusty' King as 'Dusty' King
- David Sharpe as Dave Sharpe
- Max Terhune as 'Alibi' Terhune
- Elmer as Elmer, Alibi's Dummy
- Gwen Gaze as Joan Hodgins
- Joel Davis (actor)|Joel Davis as Sonny Hodgins
- John Elliott as Uncle Will Hodgins
- Charles King as Trigger Farley, Henchman
- George Chesebro as Decker, Gang-Boss
- Frank Ellis as Harve, Henchman
- Cecil Weston as Stage Passenger
- Hal Price as Sam, Grocery Man

== See also ==
The Range Busters series:

- The Range Busters (1940)
- Trailing Double Trouble (1940)
- West of Pinto Basin (1940)
- Trail of the Silver Spurs (1941)
- The Kid's Last Ride (1941)
- Tumbledown Ranch in Arizona (1941)
- Wrangler's Roost (1941)
- Fugitive Valley (1941)
- Saddle Mountain Roundup (1941)
- Tonto Basin Outlaws (1941)
- Underground Rustlers (1941)
- Thunder River Feud (1942)
- Rock River Renegades (1942)
- Boot Hill Bandits (1942)
- Texas Trouble Shooters (1942)
- Arizona Stage Coach (1942)
- Texas to Bataan (1942)
- Trail Riders (1942)
- Two Fisted Justice (1943)
- Haunted Ranch (1943)
- Land of Hunted Men (1943)
- Cowboy Commandos (1943)
- Black Market Rustlers (1943)
- Bullets and Saddles (1943)

== Bibliography ==
- Bernard A. Drew. Motion Picture Series and Sequels: A Reference Guide. Routledge, 2013.
