= John "Dusty" King =

American actor (1909–1987)

John King
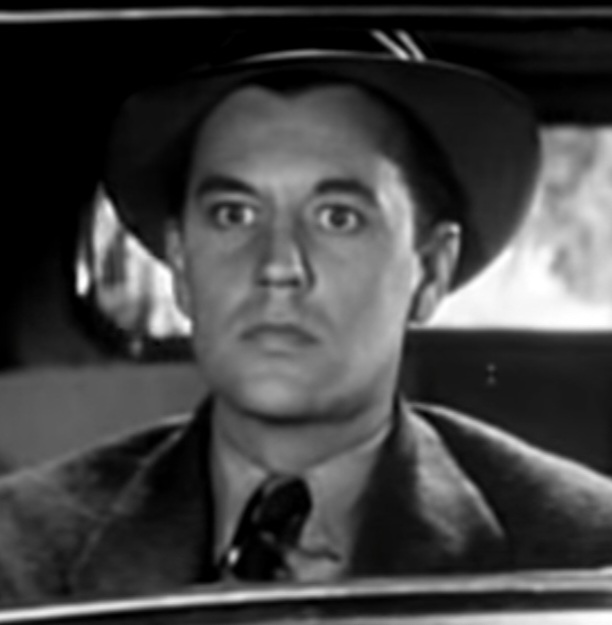
- King in Half a Sinner (1940)
- Born: Miller McLeod Everson; July 11, 1909; Cincinnati, Ohio, U.S.
- Died: November 11, 1987 (aged 78)
- Occupation: Actor
- Years active: 1935–1946

John 'Dusty' King (born Miller McLeod Everson, July 11, 1909 – November 11, 1987) was an American singer and film actor renowned for his Westerns particularly the Range Busters series.

== Biography ==
Everson was born in Cincinnati, Ohio. A graduate of the University of Cincinnati, Everson travelled the country working a variety of jobs, such as chauffeuring motorcars from Detroit to Cincinnati, lumberjacking in New Mexico, and working as a ranch hand in Arizona.

Everson found himself a radio announcing job in Covington, Kentucky then returned to Cincinnati where he announced, hosted, and sang. Hearing him on the radio, bandleader Ben Bernie hired him as a singer with Everson changing his name to John King. Noting his good looks and popularity, Bernie recommended him to Hollywood with Zeppo Marx also agreeing with Bernie.

== Hollywood ==
King was contracted to Universal Pictures making several films and playing the lead in the serial Ace Drummond. He made appearances in films for other studios before being hired by Monogram Pictures to play the lead in a Cinecolor Western, The Gentleman from Arizona in 1939. The following year King would play "Dusty" in the Range Busters series of Westerns.

The Range Busters were Monogram's version of Republic Pictures' The Three Mesquiteers. King played the singing cowboy alongside of Ray "Crash" Corrigan who was later replaced by David Sharpe and comedy relief Max Terhune with his dummy Elmer for a total of 18 films in the series.

In Haunted Ranch (1943), Sharpe leaves the trio to enlist in the US Army in the Spanish–American War. Not only did Sharpe actually enlist in the US Army Air Forces but King himself was drafted in the USAAF serving in Special Services in Arizona.

After discharge there were no film offers, so King returned to radio, later buying a station. He later left the radio industry to run a waffle shop in La Jolla, California.

== Filmography ==
Year	Title	Role	Notes
1935	Stolen Harmony	Fagin in Skit	Uncredited
1935	The Affair of Susan	Boy in Fun House	Uncredited
1935	His Night Out	Salesman	Uncredited
1935	Three Kids and a Queen	Reporter	Uncredited
1935	Fighting Youth	Singing Band Leader	
1936	The Adventures of Frank Merriwell	Bruce Browning	Serial
1936	Next Time We Love	Juvenile	Uncredited
1936	Dangerous Waters	Singing Sailor	
1936	Sutter's Gold	Alvarado Jr.	Uncredited
1936	Love Before Breakfast	Johnny	Uncredited
1936	Nobody's Fool	Master of Ceremonies	Uncredited
1936	Crash Donovan	Johnny Allen	
1936	Postal Inspector	Ralph	Uncredited
1936	Ace Drummond	Ace Drummond	Serial
1936	Three Smart Girls	Bill Evans	
1937	The Road Back	Ernst	
1937	Merry-Go-Round of 1938	Tony Townsend	
1938	The Crime of Doctor Hallet	Dr. Philip Saunders	
1938	State Police	Sgt. Dan Prescott	
1938	Breaking the Ice	Henry Johnson	
1938	Sharpshooters	Prince Alexis	
1938	Charlie Chan in Honolulu	Randolph	
1939	The Three Musketeers	Aramis	
1939	Inside Story	Paul Randall	
1939	The Hardys Ride High	Philip 'Phil' Westcott	
1939	Mr. Moto Takes a Vacation	Howard Stevens	
1939	The Gentleman from Arizona	Pokey Sanders	
1940	Midnight Limited	Val Lennon	
1940	Half a Sinner	Larry Cameron	
1940	The Range Busters	'Dusty' King	
1940	Trailing Double Trouble	'Dusty' King	
1940	West of Pinto Basin	'Dusty' King	
1940	Blame It on Love	Jeff Wadsworth	
1941	Trail of the Silver Spurs	Dusty King	
1941	The Kid's Last Ride	Dusty King	
1941	Tumbledown Ranch in Arizona	Dusty King	
1941	Wrangler's Roost	Dusty King	
1941	Fugitive Valley	Dusty King	
1941	Saddle Mountain Roundup	Dusty King	
1941	Tonto Basin Outlaws	Dusty King	
1941	Underground Rustlers	Dusty King	
1942	Thunder River Feud	Dusty King	
1942	Law of the Jungle	Larry Mason	
1942	Rock River Renegades	Dusty King	
1942	Boot Hill Bandits	Dusty King	
1942	Texas Trouble Shooters	Dusty King	
1942	Arizona Stage Coach	Dusty King	
1942	Texas to Bataan	Dusty King	
1942	Trail Riders	Dusty King	
1943	Two Fisted Justice	Dusty King	
1943	Haunted Ranch	Dusty King posing as Hank Travers	
1946	Renegade Girl	Cpl. Brown	(final film role)
