= George W. Weeks =

American film producer

- Born: March 21, 1885; Ann Arbor, Michigan, United States
- Died: November 16, 1953 (aged 68); Los Angeles, California, United States
- Occupation: Producer
- Years active: 1929–1943 (film)

George W. Weeks (1885–1953) was an American film producer. During the early 1930s he was involved with Sono Art Pictures and Mayfair Pictures. In the 1940s he released his films, including the Range Busters series featuring Ray "Crash" Corrigan, through Monogram Pictures.

== Selected filmography ==
- The Rainbow Man (1929)
- Blaze o' Glory (1929)
- Thus Is Life (1930)
- Reno (1930)
- Hell-Bent for Frisco (1931)
- Law of the Rio Grande (1931)
- In Old Cheyenne (1931)
- Air Police (1931)
- Is There Justice? (1931)
- Honeymoon Lane (1931)
- Mounted Fury (1931)
- Neck and Neck (1931)
- Devil on Deck (1932)
- The Honor of the Press (1932)
- No Living Witness (1932)
- Trapped in Tia Juana (1932)
- Midnight Morals (1932)
- Behind Jury Doors (1932)
- Tangled Destinies (1932)
- Temptation's Workshop (1932)
- Love in High Gear (1932)
- The Heart Punch (1932)
- Malay Nights (1932)
- The Midnight Warning (1932)
- Sister to Judas (1932)
- Justice Takes a Holiday (1933)
- Dance Hall Hostess (1933)
- The Big Bluff (1933)
- West of Pinto Basin (1940)
- Trailing Double Trouble (1940)
- The Range Busters (1940)
- Trail of the Silver Spurs (1941)
- Tonto Basin Outlaws (1941)
- Underground Rustlers (1941)
- Tumbledown Ranch in Arizona (1941)
- The Kid's Last Ride (1941)
- Fugitive Valley (1941)
- Saddle Mountain Roundup (1941)
- Wrangler's Roost (1941)
- Trail Riders (1942)
- Texas to Bataan (1942)
- War Dogs (1942)
- Boot Hill Bandits (1942)
- Arizona Stage Coach (1942)
- Thunder River Feud (1942)
- Rock River Renegades (1942)
- Texas Trouble Shooters (1942)
- Black Market Rustlers (1943)
- Haunted Ranch (1943)
- Cowboy Commandos (1943)
- Land of Hunted Men (1943)
- Two Fisted Justice (1943)

== Bibliography ==
- De las Carreras, María Elena & Horak, Jan-Christopher. Hollywood Goes Latin: Spanish-Language Cinema in Los Angeles. Indiana University Press, 2019.
- Pitts, Michael R. Poverty Row Studios, 1929–1940: An Illustrated History of 55 Independent Film Companies, with a Filmography for Each. McFarland & Company, 2005.
