= Gwen Gaze =

Australian actress

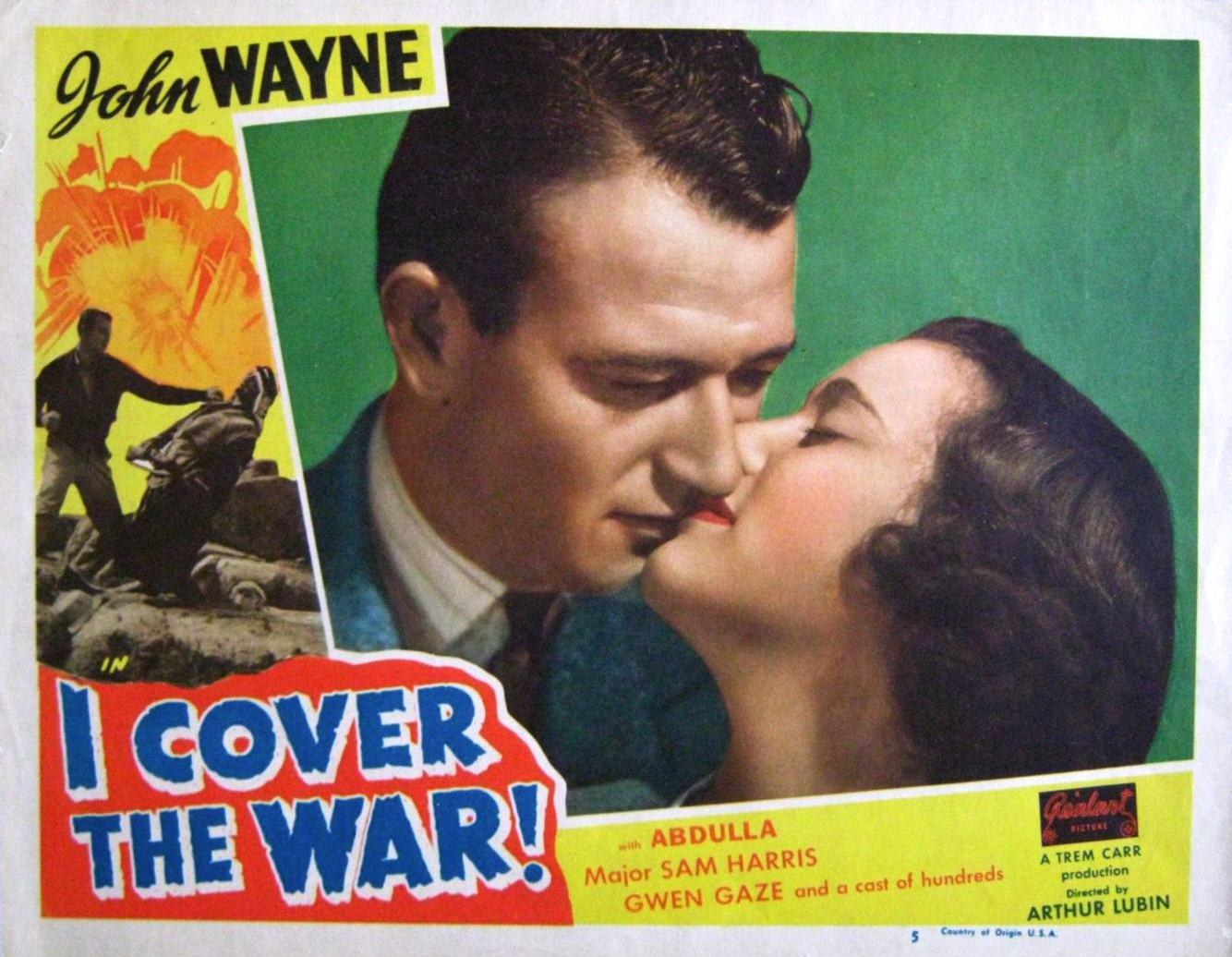
- Lobby card from I Cover the War (1937) with John Wayne and Gwen Gaze
- Born: Alta Gwendolyn Gaze; 6 September 1915; Melbourne, Victoria, Australia
- Died: 29 August 2010 (aged 94); Seattle, Washington, U.S.
- Other name: Gwen Steinhart (married name)
- Occupation: Actress
- Years active: 1937–1943
- Spouse(s): Martin Straith (1944-1948, his death); Arden C. Steinhart (1969-1994, his death)
- Children: Peter, Carol

Alta Gwendolyn Gaze (6 September 1915 – 29 August 2010) was an American-based film actress (1937–1943), born in Melbourne, Victoria, Australia.

Gaze was a graduate of Pasadena Junior College in California and the Royal Academy of Dramatic Art in London, England. She acted in several productions while she was in England. After relocating to the United States, she acted in Little Theatre productions. She also appeared in The Women on stage in New York.

Gaze was signed by Universal Pictures, making her film debut opposite John Wayne in I Cover the War (1937). She worked in two Hopalong Cassidy films in 1938, playing opposite William Boyd. Her first Hoppy film, Partners of the Plains, offered one of her strongest characters as domineering English girl, Lorna Drake. She is perhaps best remembered as the ingenue in the 1938 serial The Secret of Treasure Island opposite action star Don Terry.

In the early 1940s, Gaze worked in radio in New York and Hollywood before moving to Vancouver, British Columbia, where she was a member of the staff at CKWX radio.

In 1944, Gaze married Martin Straith, temporarily ending her career. They had two children. After he died in 1948, she resumed working on radio in Vancouver and performed on stage and on television. In 1969, Gaze married architect Arden C. Steinhart, and they moved to Seattle. He died in 1994.

Gaze died in Seattle, Washington in 2010.

== Partial filmography ==
- I Cover the War (1937)
- Partners of the Plains (1938)
- The Secret of Treasure Island (1938, serial)
- Bar 20 Justice (1938)
- West of Pinto Basin (1940)
- Underground Rustlers (1941)
- Wrangler's Roost (1941)
- House of Errors (1942)
- Two Fisted Justice (1943)
