= Range Busters =

American film series

The Range Busters
- Starring: Ray "Crash" Corrigan; John "Dusty" King; Max "Alibi" Terhune; David "Davy" Sharpe; Rex Lease; Dennis "Denny" Moore
- Production company: Corriganville Movie Ranch
- Distributed by: Monogram Pictures
- Country: United States
- Language: English

The Range Busters was a 1940–1943 American Western film series of 24 films. They were about the adventures of a trio of cowboys, many filmed at the Corriganville Movie Ranch, produced by George W. Weeks and distributed by Monogram Pictures. The series used "Home on the Range" as its theme song with each film featuring the heroes waving goodbye and promising to return in another adventure.

== Production ==
Ray "Crash" Corrigan had previously made 24 films in Republic Pictures' The Three Mesquiteers series. When he and ventriloquist Max Terhune, who had made 21 films in the series, both had disputes over money with Republic, Corrigan went to producer George W. Weeks with the idea of a similar series that would be distributed by Monogram Pictures and filmed at the movie ranch with Western sets owned by Corrigan, the Corriganville Movie Ranch in the Simi Hills of the Simi Valley. Corrigan said in an interview that he received 50% of the profits of the series.

For a third member of the trio (or third and a half if you include Terhune's dummy Elmer) Monogram chose singing cowboy John "Dusty" King who had the lead in Monogram's The Gentleman from Arizona.

The first film in the series in 1940 was appropriately titled The Range Busters. Monogram also had another "Trigger Trio" series of "the Rough Riders" which ended in 1942 after Buck Jones's death and Colonel Tim McCoy returned to active service.

Though the characters were the same from film to film, the series inexplicably changed time periods, going to contemporary times for 1942's Texas to Bataan, Cowboy Commandos and Black Market Rustlers (both 1943) then reverting to the Wild West days for the others in the series.

Corrigan left the series temporarily over money disputes and was replaced by ace stuntman David Sharpe beginning with Texas to Bataan. In Haunted Ranch (1943) Sharpe enlists in the US Army to fight in the Spanish–American War. In real life both Sharpe and King joined the US Army Air Forces. Corrigan returned to replace Sharpe with Deputy Rex Lease taking Sharpe's place halfway through the film. Dennis 'Denny' Moore replaced Lease in the last four films of the series that ended in 1943's Bullets and Saddles. An experienced Western star, Moore was unfit for military service due to the injuries he received in an airplane crash.

After the last Range Buster film, 1943's Bullets and Saddles, Corrigan mostly played in films wearing his gorilla suit in such films as Nabonga and gave his full attention to Corriganville. When Corrigan opened Corriganville on weekends to the general public in 1949, he hired his former co-star Terhune to entertain the ranch visitors.

== Films ==
The first 16 films star "Crash" Corrigan, "Dusty" King, and "Alibi" Terhune.

- The Range Busters (1940)
- Trailing Double Trouble (1940)
- West of Pinto Basin (1940)
- Trail of the Silver Spurs (1941)
- The Kid's Last Ride (1941)
- Tumbledown Ranch in Arizona (1941)
- Wrangler's Roost (1941)
- Fugitive Valley (1941)
- Saddle Mountain Roundup (1941)
- Tonto Basin Outlaws (1941)
- Underground Rustlers (1941)
- Thunder River Feud (1942)
- Rock River Renegades (1942)
- Boot Hill Bandits (1942)
- Texas Trouble Shooters (1942)
- Arizona Stage Coach (1942)

The next four films star "Dusty" King, "Davy" Sharpe and "Alibi" Terhune, with Rex Lease joining the team in the fourth.

- Texas to Bataan (1942)
- Trail Riders (1942)
- Two Fisted Justice (1943)
- Haunted Ranch (1943)

The final four films star "Crash" Corrigan, "Denny" Moore and "Alibi" Terhune.

- Land of Hunted Men (1943)
- Cowboy Commandos (1943)
- Black Market Rustlers (1943)
- Bullets and Saddles (1943)
