= Silver Stallion (1941 film) =

1941 film

- Directed by: Edward Finney
- Written by: Robert Emmett Tansey
- Produced by: Edward Finney
- Starring: David Sharpe; LeRoy Mason; Chief Thundercloud
- Cinematography: Marcel Le Picard
- Edited by: Fred Bain
- Music by: Frank Sanucci
- Production company: Edward F. Finney Productions
- Distributed by: Monogram Pictures
- Release date: May 28, 1941
- Running time: 60 minutes
- Country: United States
- Language: English

Silver Stallion is a 1941 American Western film directed by Edward Finney and starring David Sharpe, LeRoy Mason and Chief Thundercloud. It was distributed by Monogram Pictures.

== Cast ==
- David Sharpe as Davey Duncan
- LeRoy Mason as Pascal Nolan
- Chief Thundercloud as Freshwater
- Thornton Edwards as Tronco
- Walter Long as Benson
- Janet Waldo as Jan Walton
- Fred Hoose as Dad Walton

== Bibliography ==
- Pitts, Michael R. Western Movies: A Guide to 5,105 Feature Films. McFarland, 2012.
