= Max Terhune =

American actor (1891–1973)

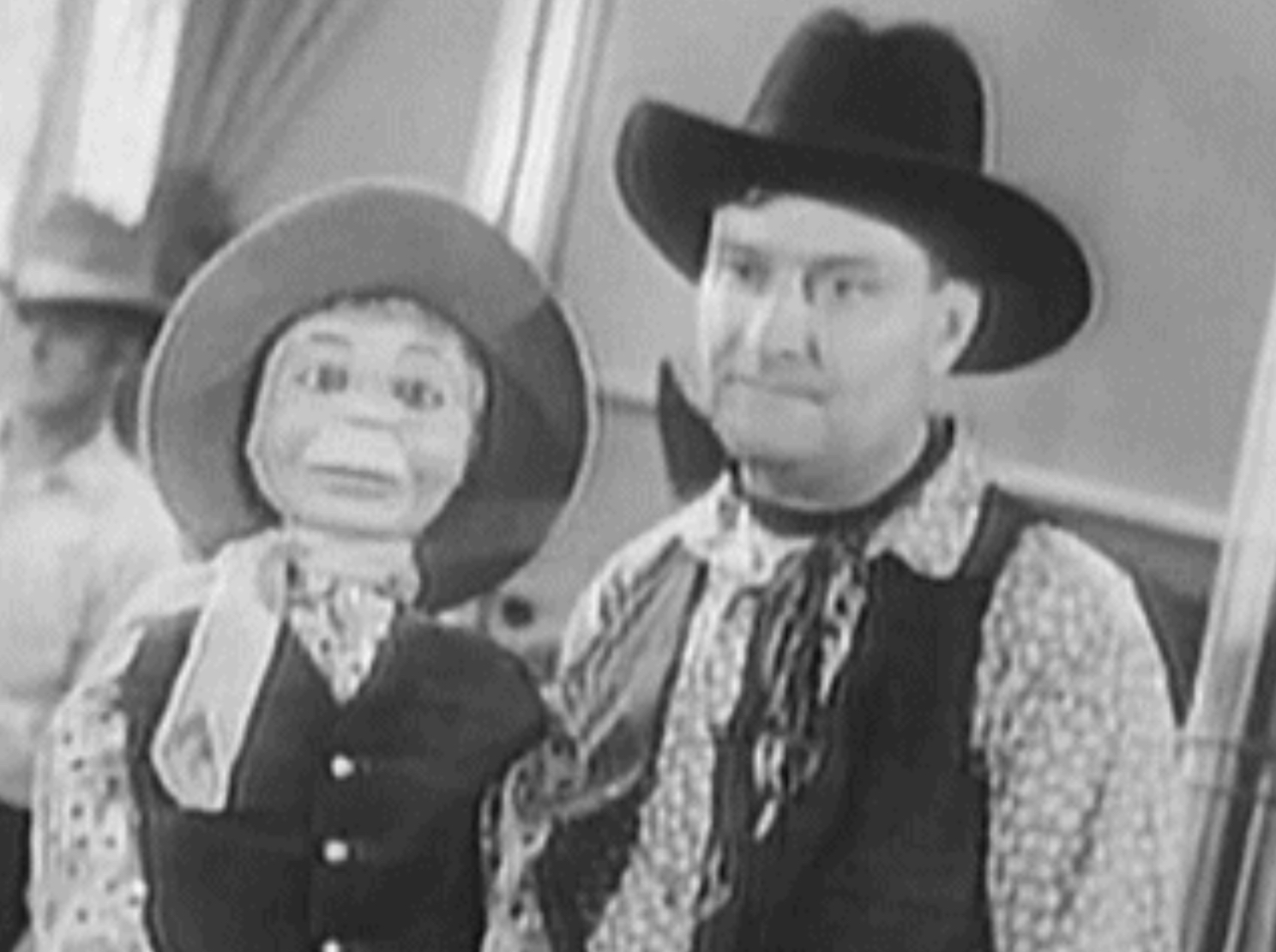
- Terhune with his dummy Elmer in The Big Show (1936)
- Born: February 12, 1891; Franklin, Indiana, U.S.
- Died: June 5, 1973 (aged 82); Cottonwood, Arizona, U.S.
- Occupation: Actor
- Years active: 1936–1956
- Spouse: Maude Cassidy (m. 1922; died 1966)
- Children: 3

Robert Max Terhune (February 12, 1891 – June 5, 1973) was an American actor. He appeared in nearly 70 films, mostly B-westerns, between 1936 and 1956. Among these, Terhune starred in The Three Mesquiteers and Range Busters series.

== Baseball ==
Terhune worked as a tool maker and when he was 20 he played semi-pro baseball for teams in Minneapolis, Indianapolis, and Newark; he also spent the 1913 season playing Class-D baseball for the Vincennes Alices of the Kitty League.

During this time he became friends with Kermit Maynard, a star university athlete who launched a career as a silent western movie star that continued into the sound era. Kermit's younger brother was Ken Maynard, a hugely popular western star from the early 1920s through the 1930s.

== Film career ==
Terhune performed in 21 episodes of a popular Republic Studios western series called The Three Mesquiteers. His character, Lullaby Joslin, was launched by another popular character actor, Syd Saylor, but then Terhune stepped into the series which, involving 12 different actors, lasted for a total of 51 pictures over eight years. His co-stars in 15 of the pictures were Robert Livingston and Ray "Crash" Corrigan. He then worked with Corrigan and John Wayne, who took over Livingston's role shortly before Wayne's career was launched by his starring role in Stagecoach.

Terhune and Corrigan went on to work together in another trio western series, The Range Busters (24 entries with Ray Corrigan and John King at Monogram Pictures). He did several supporting roles with Gene Autry (at Republic). It was Autry, with whom he had worked in radio in Chicago, who convinced him to come to Hollywood. Later he worked in Johnny Mack Brown westerns at Monogram. Terhune played the comic sidekick (Lullaby Joslin in the Republic Pictures Mesquiteers movies and usually a character called Alibi in the Monogram Pictures thereafter) – with a major distinction. He always traveled the range with his dummy Elmer sharing his saddle. Elmer received a film credit for his appearances.

== Magic ==
Besides being a ventriloquist, whistler and animal imitator, Terhune was a magician. Card tricks were his forte, and he often performed such in his movies. His former vaudeville act included juggling, bird calls and barnyard animal impressions, talents also incorporated into his sidekick roles. His hands doubled for those of Clark Gable in "The King and Four Queens" in 1956. He performed on occasion at The Magic Castle in Hollywood. (Source: Audio interview: Max Terhune 1971)

== Later years ==
He appeared frequently on weekends in the 1950s at Corriganville, a popular western film location developed by his co-star and friend who purchased the land in the late 1930s. Tourists paid to see stunt shows and musical performances as well as wander around the western streets where scores of films and TV episodes were filmed over 25 years. His last film role was in the major Hollywood film Giant, in which he played the dramatic role of the physician Dr. Walker.

== Family ==
Terhune married Maude Cassady and they had three children: Donald Roltaire, Robert, and Maxine. His son Robert was a stuntman who doubled burly actors like George Kennedy in films. Donald Roltaire was killed at age 27 in an automobile accident near Fresno, California, in 1958.

== Death ==
Terhune died in Cottonwood, Arizona, at the age of 82.

== Selected filmography ==
- Ride Ranger Ride (1936) – Rufe Jones
- Ghost-Town Gold (1936) – Lullaby Joslin
- The Big Show (1936) – Ventriloquist
- Roarin' Lead (1936) – Lullaby Joslin
- Riders of the Whistling Skull (1937) – Lullaby Joslin
- Hit the Saddle (1937) – Lullaby Joslin
- The Hit Parade (1937) – Rusty Callahan
- Gunsmoke Ranch (1937) – Lullaby Joslin
- Come on, Cowboys (1937) – Lullaby Joslin
- Range Defenders (1937) – Lullaby Joslin
- Heart of the Rockies (1937) – Lullaby Joslin
- Boots and Saddles (1937) – Wedding Guest (uncredited)
- The Trigger Trio (1937) – Lullaby Joslin
- Manhattan Merry-Go-Round (1937) – Himself
- Wild Horse Rodeo (1937) – Lullaby Joslin
- Mama Runs Wild (1937) – Applegate
- The Purple Vigilantes (1938) – Lullaby Joslin
- Call the Mesquiteers (1938) – Lullaby Joslin
- Outlaws of Sonora (1938) – Lullaby Joslin
- Ladies in Distress (1938) – Dave Evans
- Riders of the Black Hills (1938) – Lullaby Joslin
- Heroes of the Hills (1938) – Lullaby Joslin
- Pals of the Saddle (1938) – Lullaby Joslin
- Overland Stage Raiders (1938) – Lullaby Joslin
- Santa Fe Stampede (1938) – Lullaby Joslin
- Red River Range (1938) – Lullaby Joslin
- The Night Riders (1939) – Lullaby Joslin
- Man of Conquest (1939) – Deaf Smith
- Three Texas Steers (1939) – Lullaby Joslin
- The Range Busters (1940) – 'Alibi' Terhune
- Trailing Double Trouble (1940) – 'Alibi' Terhune
- West of Pinto Basin (1940) – 'Alibi' Terhune
- Trail of the Silver Spurs (1941) – 'Alibi' Terhune
- The Kid's Last Ride (1941) – 'Alibi' Terhune
- Tumbledown Ranch in Arizona (1941) – 'Alibi' Terhune
- Wrangler's Roost (1941) – 'Alibi' Terhune
- Fugitive Valley (1941) – 'Alibi' Terhune
- Saddle Mountain Roundup (1941) – 'Alibi' Terhune
- Tonto Basin Outlaws (1941) – 'Alibi' Terhune
- Underground Rustlers (1941) – 'Alibi' Terhune
- Thunder River Feud (1942) – 'Alibi' Terhune
- Rock River Renegades (1942) – 'Alibi' Terhune
- Boot Hill Bandits (1942) – 'Alibi' Terhune
- Texas Trouble Shooters (1942) – 'Alibi' Terhune
- Arizona Stage Coach (1942) – 'Alibi' Terhune
- Texas to Bataan (1942) – 'Alibi' Terhune
- Trail Riders (1942) – 'Alibi' Terhune
- Two Fisted Justice (1943) – 'Alibi' Terhune
- Haunted Ranch (1943) – 'Alibi' Terhune
- Land of Hunted Men (1943) – 'Alibi' Terhune
- Cowboy Commandos (1943) – 'Alibi' Terhune
- Black Market Rustlers (1943) – 'Alibi' Terhune
- Bullets and Saddles (1943) – 'Alibi' Terhune
- Cowboy Canteen (1944) – Professor Merlin
- Sheriff of Sundown (1944) – Third Grade Simms
- Harmony Trail (1944) – Marshal Max Terhune
- Swing, Cowboy, Swing (1946) – 'Alibi' Terhune
- Along the Oregon Trail (1947) – Himself
- The Sheriff of Medicine Bow (1948) – Alibi
- Gunning for Justice (1948) – Alibi Parsons
- Hidden Danger (1948) – Alibi
- Law of the West (1949) – Alibi Jenkins
- Trails End (1949) – Alibi
- West of El Dorado (1949) – Alibi
- Range Justice (1949) – Alibi
- Western Renegades (1949) – Sheriff Alibi
- Square Dance Jubilee (1949) – Sheriff
- Rawhide (1951) – Stagecoach Passenger from Missouri (uncredited)
- Jim Thorpe – All-American (1951) – Farmer (uncredited)
- Giant (1956) – Dr. Walker (uncredited)

== Television ==
- The Lone Ranger – Sidney Boswell, episode: "Danger Ahead" (1950)
- I Love Lucy - Ventriloquist, episode: "Ricky Loses His Temper" (1954)
