= George Chesebro =

American actor (1888–1959)

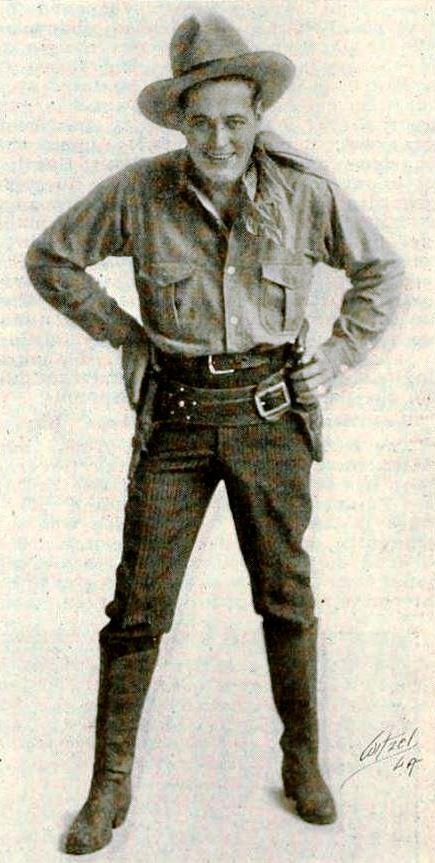
- Chesebro in 1919
- Born: George Newell Chesebro; July 29, 1888; Minneapolis, Minnesota, US
- Died: May 28, 1959 (aged 70); Los Angeles, California, US
- Years active: 1915–1954

George Newell Chesebro (July 29, 1888 – May 28, 1959) was an American film actor. He appeared in more than 400 films between 1915 and 1954. He was born in Minneapolis, Minnesota and died in Los Angeles, California.

== Partial filmography ==
- Mignon (1915)
- Because of a Woman (1917)
- The Show Down (1917)
- Indiscreet Corinne (1917)
- Broadway Arizona (1917)
- Mr. Opp (1917)
- Wild Sumac (1917)
- Hands Up! (1918)
- Modern Love (1918)
- The She Wolf (1919)
- The Lost City (1920)
- The Hope Diamond Mystery (1921)
- The Diamond Queen (1921)
- Wolf Blood (1925)
- Money to Burn (1926)
- Rustlers' Ranch (1926)
- Hearts and Spangles (1926)
- The Mile-a-Minute Man (1926)
- Mountains of Manhattan (1927)
- The Silent Avenger (1927)
- Should a Girl Marry? (1928)
- Handcuffed (1929)
- Lariats and Six-Shooters (1931)
- The Sheriff's Secret (1931)
- Wild West Whoopee (1931)
- The Kid from Arizona (1931)
- 45 Calibre Echo (1932)
- The County Fair (1932)
- The Fighting Champ (1932)
- Alias Mary Smith (1932)
- Gorilla Ship (1932)
- Mark of the Spur (1932)
- Tex Takes a Holiday (1932)
- Mystery Mountain (1934)
- The Law of the Wild (1934)
- Western Racketeers (1934)
- The Man Trailer (1934)
- The Miracle Rider (1935)
- The Adventures of Rex and Rinty (1935)
- Danger Ahead (1935)
- Fighting Caballero (1935)
- The Man from Guntown (1935)
- Pals of the Range (1935)
- Cyclone of the Saddle (1935)
- Wild Mustang (1935)
- Custer's Last Stand (1936)
- The Lawless Nineties (1936)
- Code of the Range (1936)
- The Speed Reporter (1936)
- Desert Guns (1936)
- Robinson Crusoe of Clipper Island (1936)
- S.O.S. Coast Guard (1937)
- Two-Fisted Sheriff (1937)
- Two Gun Law (1937)
- Rio Grande (1938)
- Outlaws of Sonora (1938)
- Squadron of Honor (1938)
- The Purple Vigilantes (1938)
- Lawless Valley (1938)
- The Colorado Trail (1938)
- Call of the Rockies (1938)
- Law of the Plains (1938)
- Daredevils of the Red Circle (1939)
- Billy the Kid Outlawed (1940)
- Wild Horse Valley (1940)
- Wild Horse Range (1940)
- West of Pinto Basin (1940)
- Frontier Crusader (1940)
- Gun Code (1940)
- Covered Wagon Trails (1940)
- Pioneer Days (1940)
- Lightning Strikes West (1940)
- The Lone Rider in Ghost Town (1941)
- Roaring Frontiers (1941)
- The Lone Rider Ambushed (1941)
- The Lone Rider in Cheyenne (1941)
- Trail of the Silver Spurs (1941)
- The Pioneers (1941)
- Wrangler's Roost (1941)
- Saddle Mountain Roundup (1941)
- Boot Hill Bandits (1942)
- Thunder River Feud (1942)
- Two Fisted Justice (1943)
- Death Rides the Plains (1943)
- Raiders of Red Gap (1943)
- Cowboy Commandos (1943)
- Black Market Rustlers (1943)
- Fugitive of the Plains (1943)
- Blazing Frontier (1943)
- Devil Riders (1943)
- The Drifter (1944)
- Gangster's Den (1945)
- Rough Ridin' Justice (1945)
- Gunning for Vengeance (1946)
- Overland Riders (1946)
- Gentlemen with Guns (1946)
- Terror Trail (1946)
- The Lone Hand Texan (1947)
- Out West (1947)
- Song of the Wasteland (1947)
- Black Hills (1947)
- Vigilantes of Boomtown (1947)
- Law of the Canyon (1947)
- Shadow Valley (1947)
- West of Dodge City (1947)
- Wyoming (1947)
- Stage to Mesa City (1947)
- Check Your Guns (1948)
- Frontier Revenge (1948)
- Death Valley Gunfighter (1949)
- Trails End (1949)
- Roll, Thunder, Roll! (1949)
- Gunmen of Abilene (1950)
- Punchy Cowpunchers (1950)
- The Traveling Saleswoman (1950)
- Gunslingers (1950)
- Trail of Robin Hood (1950)
- The Kid from Amarillo (1951)
- Pals and Gals (1954)
