= Frank Sanucci =

Argentine-born American composer

- Born: March 16, 1901; Buenos Aires, Argentina
- Died: May 14, 1991 (aged 90); Vista, California, United States
- Occupation: Composer
- Years active: 1936–1952 (film)

Frank Sanucci (1901–1991) was an Argentine-born American composer who scored numerous films. Born in Buenos Aires he emigrated to the United States as a child. He worked in Hollywood on generally low-budget productions, many of them for Monogram Pictures where he was employed for several years. He was also employed at Universal Pictures, Grand National Pictures and Astor Pictures.

== Selected filmography ==
- Song of the Gringo (1936)
- Headin' for the Rio Grande (1936)
- Riders of the Rockies (1937)
- Riders of the Dawn (1937)
- God's Country and the Man (1937)
- Stars Over Arizona (1937)
- Hittin' the Trail (1937)
- Trouble in Texas (1937)
- Where Trails Divide (1937)
- Romance of the Rockies (1937)
- The Mystery of the Hooded Horsemen (1937)
- Tex Rides with the Boy Scouts (1937)
- Arizona Days (1937)
- Where the Buffalo Roam (1938)
- The Singing Outlaw (1938)
- Border Wolves (1938)
- Two Gun Justice (1938)
- Frontier Town (1938)
- The Last Stand (1938)
- Prison Break (1938)
- Prairie Justice (1938)
- Feud of the Range (1938)
- Gunsmoke Trail (1938)
- Outlaw Express (1938)
- Starlight Over Texas (1938)
- Mystery Plane (1939)
- Westbound Stage (1939)
- Ghost Town Riders (1939)
- Lure of the Wasteland (1939)
- Rollin' Westward (1939)
- Riders of the Sage (1939)
- Guilty Trails (1939)
- Down the Wyoming Trail (1939)
- Mesquite Buckaroo (1939)
- The Phantom Stage (1939)
- Overland Mail (1939)
- Stunt Pilot (1939)
- Man from Texas (1939)
- Riders of the Frontier (1939)
- El Diablo Rides (1939)
- The Cowboy from Sundown (1940)
- The Golden Trail (1940)
- Roll Wagons Roll (1940)
- Rhythm of the Rio Grande (1940)
- Covered Wagon Trails (1940)
- Rollin' Home to Texas (1940)
- Wild Horse Valley (1940)
- Pinto Canyon (1940)
- Riot Squad (1941)
- Tonto Basin Outlaws (1941)
- Ridin' the Cherokee Trail (1941)
- Riding the Sunset Trail (1941)
- The Gang's All Here (1941)
- Fugitive Valley (1941)
- Silver Stallion (1941)
- The Pioneers (1941)
- Gentleman from Dixie (1941)
- The Living Ghost (1942)
- Rock River Renegades (1942)
- King of the Stallions (1942)
- Thunder River Feud (1942)
- Western Mail (1942)
- Arizona Roundup (1942)
- The Man with Two Lives (1942)
- Boot Hill Bandits (1942)
- Where Trails End (1942)
- Down Texas Way (1942)
- War Dogs (1942)
- Trail Riders (1942)
- One Thrilling Night (1942)
- Texas Trouble Shooters (1942)
- Arizona Stage Coach (1942)
- Phantom Killer (1942)
- Texas to Bataan (1942)
- Haunted Ranch (1943)
- Wild Horse Stampede (1943)
- The Texas Kid (1943)
- Two Fisted Justice (1943)
- Death Valley Rangers (1943)
- Cowboy Commandos (1943)
- The Law Rides Again (1943)
- Song of the Range (1944)
- Arizona Whirlwind (1944)
- Harmony Trail (1944)
- Trigger Law (1944)
- Marked Trails (1944)
- Youth Aflame (1944)
- A Fig Leaf for Eve (1944)
- Sonora Stagecoach (1944)
- Fighting Bill Carson (1945)
- Stranger from Santa Fe (1945)
- Saddle Serenade (1945)
- Springtime in Texas (1945)
- Flame of the West (1945)
- The Lonesome Trail (1945)
- Northwest Trail (1945)
- His Brother's Ghost (1945)
- Riders of the Dawn (1945)
- Border Bandits (1946)
- Song of the Sierras (1946)
- Trail to Mexico (1946)
- West of the Alamo (1946)
- Swing, Cowboy, Swing (1946)
- Moon Over Montana (1946)
- Rainbow Over the Rockies (1947)
- Six-Gun Serenade (1947)
- Deadline (1948)
- Fighting Mustang (1948)
- Sunset Carson Rides Again (1948)
- Buffalo Bill in Tomahawk Territory (1952)

== Bibliography ==
- Pitts, Michael R. Poverty Row Studios, 1929–1940: An Illustrated History of 55 Independent Film Companies, with a Filmography for Each. McFarland & Company, 2005.
