= Swing, Cowboy, Swing =

1946 film

- Directed by: Elmer Clifton
- Written by: Elmer Clifton
- Produced by: Birger E. Williamson
- Starring: Cal Shrum; Max Terhune; Alta Lee
- Cinematography: Robert E. Cline
- Edited by: George M. Merrick
- Music by: Frank Sanucci
- Production company: Three Crown Productions
- Distributed by: Astor Pictures
- Release date: March 7, 1946
- Running time: 59 minutes
- Country: United States
- Language: English

Swing, Cowboy, Swing is a 1946 American musical Western film directed by Elmer Clifton and starring Cal Shrum, Max Terhune and Alta Lee. It was shot at the Corriganville Movie Ranch in California. In 1949 it was reissued under the alternative title of Bad Man from Big Bend.

== Cast ==
- Cal Shrum as Cal, Rhythm Rangers Band Leader
- Max Terhune as 'Alibi' Terhune
- Alta Lee as Alta, Cal Shrum Band Singer
- Walt Shrum as Walt, Colorado Hillbillies Band Leader
- Don Weston as Guitar Player
- I. Stanford Jolley as James Beeton
- Ann Roberts as Mary Beeton
- Frank Ellis as Frank Lawson
- Ed Cassidy as Sheriff
- Ted Adams as Henchman
- Phil Dunham as Fargo Agent
- Tom Hubbard as Tom
- Robert Hoag as Musician 'Pappy'
- Rusty Cline as Musician 'Rusty'
- Jeannie Akers as Singer
- Judy Barnes as Miss Jolley
- Chuck Peters as Musician
- Bob Woodward as Henchman
- Ace Dehne as Musician
- Al Winters as Musician

== Bibliography ==
- Pitts, Michael R. Western Movies: A Guide to 5,105 Feature Films. McFarland, 2012.
