= Ted Mapes =

American actor (1901–1984)

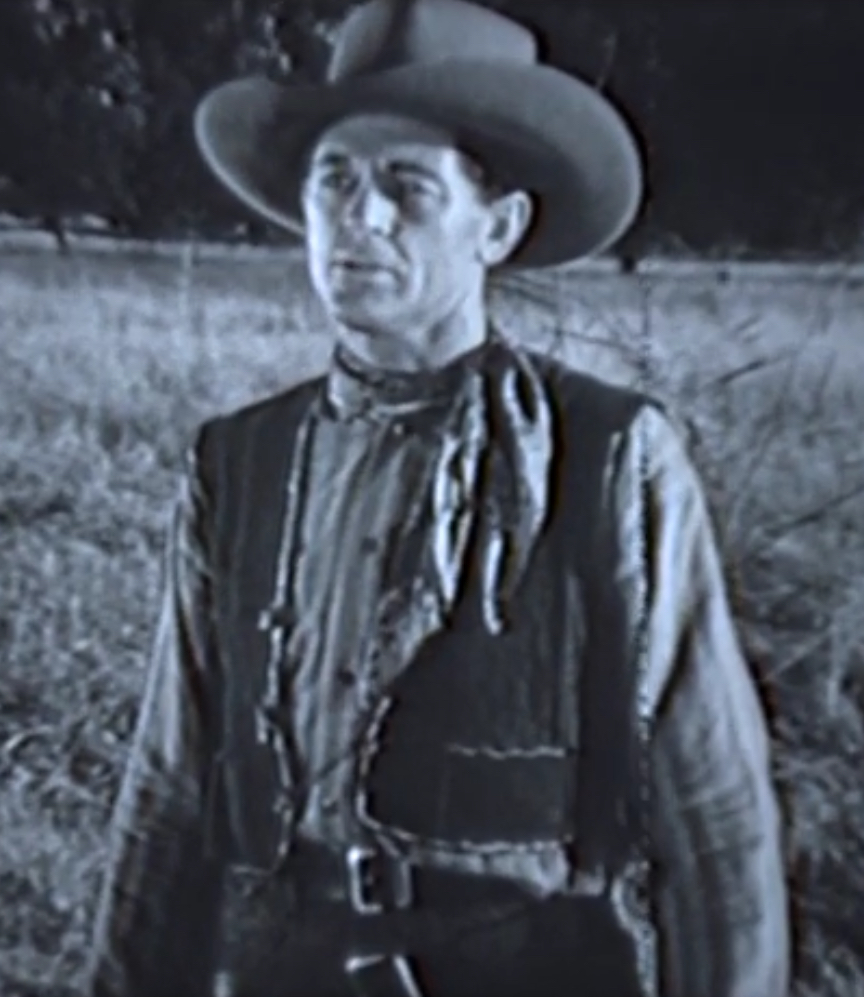
- Mapes in The Ranger and the Lady (1940)
- Born: John Tylor Mapes; November 25, 1901; St. Edward, Nebraska, U.S.
- Died: September 9, 1984 (aged 82); Burbank, California, U.S.
- Resting place: Forest Lawn Memorial Park, Hollywood Hills, California
- Occupations: Actor, stuntman
- Years active: 1929–1969

John Tylor Mapes (November 25, 1901 – September 9, 1984) was an American character actor, who was also a prolific stuntman and body double. Born on November 25, 1901, in St. Edward, Nebraska, he moved to Los Angeles in his mid-20s, and entered the film industry in 1929, first as a grip, and then as a stuntman and actor. He doubled for many famous actors, including Jimmy Stewart and Gary Cooper. His film and television career spanned forty years, during which time he appeared in hundreds of films and television shows, either as an actor, stuntman or body double. After his career in front of the camera ended in 1969, Mapes became an advocate for animal safety in films, working as an observer on sets for the American Humane Association.

== Early life ==
Born John Tylor Mapes, he grew up on the farm and ranch owned by his father. In his mid-20s, he relocated to Los Angeles, where he worked for a moving company. When he was on a job taking John Barrymore's effects away from the Samuel Goldwyn studio, he learned that studio grips were making twice his rate of pay. Shortly after, he became a grip, working on film crews for the next five years.

== Film and television career ==
While working as a grip on the 1935 Christy Cabanne film, One Frightened Night, he received his first bit role, that of a masked killer. His first official role came later that year, in the drama, The Silent Code. While he would be cast in almost 70 films over the next 25 years, most of those roles were in smaller roles. Mapes spent the rest of the 1930s acting in several film serials, including The Great Adventures of Wild Bill Hickok (for which he also did stunts), which is considered by some as the finest serial ever shot at Columbia Pictures; The Lone Ranger Rides Again, Dick Tracy's G-Men, Zorro's Fighting Legion, Son of Zorro, Adventures of Captain Marvel, and Adventures of Red Ryder. Mapes was up for the lead in Red Ryder, but the role eventually went to Don "Red" Barry.

After being in numerous serials at Republic Pictures, he also found his way into feature films as well, the first of those being The Ranger and the Lady, starring Roy Rogers and Gabby Hayes. Other notable films in which Mapes performed include: Red River Valley, again starring Rogers and Hayes; My Pal Trigger, once more with Rogers and Hayes, but this time also starring Trigger and Dale Evans; the Bob Hope and Jane Russell comedy, The Paleface (1948); Cecil B. DeMille's epic, Samson and Delilah (1949); The Gunfighter (1950), starring Gregory Peck; Winchester '73, starring Jimmy Stewart, Shelley Winters, Dan Duryea, and Stephen McNally; The Far Country, again with Stewart, this time also starring Ruth Roman, Corinne Calvet, and Walter Brennan; and once again in a Stewart film, the classic 1959 romantic comedy, Bell, Book and Candle, also starring Kim Novak.

In addition to his acting, Mapes also became involved as a body double. He doubled for many actors, including Charles Starrett but was better known for his stand-in work for Jimmy Stewart and Gary Cooper. He was Cooper's stand-in for 17 films (almost half) which Cooper shot between 1943 and Cooper's death in 1961. The first film was 1943's For Whom the Bell Tolls and the last was The Naked Edge, a thriller released in 1961. Sometimes he would also have a small role in Cooper's film, as in 1948's Unconquered. During this time he also began doubling for Stewart.

With the advent of television, Mapes appeared in dozens of shows, including Hopalong Cassidy, The Cisco Kid, Studio 57, Bat Masterson, Wagon Train, Gunsmoke, and The Virginian. His final performance was in a small role in the 1969 musical, Hello, Dolly!, directed by Gene Kelly.

== Later life and death ==
After retiring from in front of the camera, Mapes worked for the American Humane Association, visiting film sets and overseeing that the animals used in films and television were treated well. Mapes died on September 9, 1984, in Burbank, California. He was buried in Forest Lawn Memorial Park, Hollywood Hills, California.

== Filmography ==
(Per AFI database)

- The Silent Code (1935) as First Mountie Constable
- End of the Trail (1936) as Henchman (uncredited)
- Legion of Terror (1936) as Newsstand Owner (uncredited)
- The Ranger and the Lady (1940) as Kramer, Henchman
- Red River Valley (1941) as Henchman (uncredited)
- Tonto Basin Outlaws (1941) as Ricks
- Man from Cheyenne (1942) as Tall Cowhand at Dance (uncredited)
- Pardon My Gun (1942) as Lead Henchman (uncredited)
- Below the Border (1942)
- Home in Wyomin' (1942) as Bar-O Rodeo Cowboy (uncredited)
- Overland to Deadwood (1942)
- Texas Trouble Shooters (1942) as Slim
- Thunder River Feud (1942) as Buck
- A Tornado in the Saddle (1942) as Henchman (uncredited)
- Vengeance of the West (1942) as Mason, Henchman
- Frontier Fury (1943) as Jim Wallace (uncredited)
- Land of Hunted Men (1943) as Henchman Piebald
- Jam Session (1944) as Joe, Stagecoach Guard (uncredited)
- Dead or Alive (1944) as Luke Brown
- The Last Horseman (1944) as Duke Cudlow
- Law Men (1944) as Curly Balou
- Partners of the Trail (1944) as Slinkky, Henchman
- The Racket Man (1944) as Sergeant Mowbray (uncredited)
- Riding West (1944) as Henchman Keller (uncredited)
- Frontier Feud (1945) as Slade Burnett
- Incendiary Blonde (1945) as Waco Smith (uncredited)
- Outlaws of the Rockies (1945) as Deputy (uncredited)
- The Return of the Durango Kid (1945) as Tall Henchman (uncredited)
- Rustlers of the Badlands (1945) as Packard (uncredited)
- Texas Panhandle (1945) as Henchman Trig (uncredited)
- Drifting Along (1946) as Henchman Ted
- My Pal Trigger (1946) as Riley (uncredited)
- Roaring Rangers (1946) Slade, Fake Durango (uncredited)
- Two-Fisted Stranger (1946) as Duke Benson (uncredited)
- Under Arizona Skies (1946) as Red Connors
- The Well Groomed Bride (1946) as Ship Guard #1 (uncredited)
- The Fabulous Texan (1947) as Guard (uncredited)
- Riders of the Lone Star (1947) as Henchman Slade (uncredited)
- The Stranger from Ponca City (1947) as Henchman Fargo (uncredited)
- The Wild Frontier (1947) as Shaky
- Unconquered (1947) Fort Pitt Village Defender (uncredited)
- Sundown Riders (1948)
- Black Eagle: The Story of a Horse (1948) as Sam
- Desperadoes of Dodge City (1948) as Henchman Jake
- Fury at Furnace Creek (1948) as Townsman (uncredited)
- Good Sam (1948) (uncredited)
- Leather Gloves (1948)
- The Paleface (1948) as Horseman (uncredited)
- The Strawberry Roan (1948) as Smitty (uncredited)
- El Dorado Pass (1948) as Dodd
- Trail to Laredo (1948) as Chuck, Henchman (uncredited)
- Bad Men of Tombstone (1949) as Mine Foreman
- Look for the Silver Lining (1949) as Express Wagon Driver (uncredited)
- Outcasts of the Trail (1949) as Fred Smith
- Samson and Delilah (1949) as Captain killed with Jawbone (uncredited)
- Barricade (1950) as Twonsman (uncredited)
- Blondie's Hero (1950) as Fruit Salesman (uncredited)
- Cow Town (1950) as Ed Loomis, Henchman (uncredited)
- The Gunfighter (1950) as Pete's Pal (uncredited)
- Winchester '73 (1950) as Bartender (uncredited)
- Fort Worth (1951) as Outrider (uncredited)
- Raton Pass (1951) as Stagecoach Driver (uncredited)
- Calamity Jane (1953) as Townsman (uncredited)
- Topeka (1953) as Cully
- Thunder Bay (1953) as Oil Man (uncredited)
- The Boy from Oklahoma (1954) as Stage Guard (uncredited)
- The Far Country (1954) as Deputy (uncredited)
- Night Passage (1957) as Leary
- Man from God's Country (1958) as Barfly (uncredited)
- Bell Book and Candle (1958) as Gillian's Customer (uncredited)

== Selected Television Appearances ==
- Tales of Wells Fargo (1957-1962) (6 episodes)
- Wagon Train (1957-1963) (11 episodes)
- Bat Masterson (1960) (Season 2 Episode 21: "Cattle and Cane") as Agate Henchman (uncredited)
- Bonanza (1960) (Season 1 Episode 24: "The Stranger") as Party Guest (uncredited)
- Gunsmoke (1961) (Season 7 Episode 1: "Perce") as Townsman (uncredited)
- Gunsmoke (1961) (Season 7 Episode 12: "Nina's Revenge") as Barfly (uncredited)
- Gunsmoke (1962) (Season 7 Episode 26: "Durham Bull") as Townsman (uncredited)
- Laramie (1962) (Season 4 Episode 7: "The Sunday Shoot") as Townsman (uncredited)
- The Virginian (1962-1966) (11 episodes)
- Laramie (1963) (Season 4 Episode 18: "No Place to Run") as Townsman (uncredited)
- Bonanza (1963) (Season 4 Episode 33: "The Boss") as Townsman (uncredited)
- The Alfred Hitchcock Hour (1963) (Season 1 Episode 24: "The Star Juror") as Townsman (uncredited)
- Gunsmoke (1964) (Season 9 Episode 30: "The Promoter") as Townsman (uncredited)
- Gunsmoke (1964) (Season 9 Episode 31: "Trip West") as Barfly / Stage Passenger (uncredited)
