= The Secret of Treasure Island =

1938 film by Elmer Clifton

- Theatrical release poster
- Directed by: Elmer Clifton
- Screenplay by: Elmer Clifton; L. Ron Hubbard; George M. Merrick; George Rosener
- Based on: Murder at Pirate Castle by L. Ron Hubbard
- Produced by: George M. Merrick; Jack Fier (uncredited); Louis Weiss
- Starring: Don Terry; Gwen Gaze; Walter Miller; Grant Withers; George Rosener; Hobart Bosworth
- Cinematography: Edward Linden; Herman Schopp
- Edited by: Earl Turner
- Music by: Abe Meyer
- Distributed by: Columbia Pictures
- Release date: March 2, 1938
- Country: United States
- Language: English

Title card shown at the beginning of Chapter 10 of the serial

The Secret of Treasure Island is a 1938 Columbia movie serial based on the serialized Argosy magazine story Murder at Pirate Castle (1936). The magazine story was written by L. Ron Hubbard, at the time a writer of pulp fiction who went on to found the Scientology religion. The film version is divided into 15 chapters.

== Plot ==
The serial is set on a remote island near the Mexican border, where the island's ruthless owner Carter Collins (Walter Miller) holds half of an antique treasure map leading to a cache of gold hidden somewhere on the island. Reporter Larry Kent (Don Terry) arrives on the island in search of another reporter who had gone missing. Local postmaster Toni Morrell (Gwen Gaze) is summoned by Captain Tom Faxton (Warner Richmond) who, on his deathbed, gives Toni the other half of the treasure map, left to her by her father—but Faxton expires before he can divulge the identity of Toni's father. Larry and Toni, besides being opposed by Collins, are threatened by a hoodlum named Gridley (Grant Withers), who disguises in a skull mask and pirate clothing. When the disguise fails, Gridley resorts to desperate means to grab Toni's map, including kidnapping, bombing, vehicular homicide, and attempted murder. Master of the island Collins is equally determined to get the map, using death threats, cannon fire, swordsmen, and enforced suicide. The mysterious Captain Cuttle (George Rosener), an old salt with a hook for a hand, has his own reasons for investigating Captain Faxton's death, and guides Larry and Toni toward the solution of the mystery. Carter Collins finally gains the missing half of the map and locates the "secret of Treasure Island," while the vengeful Gridley sets off explosives to destroy the island's underground tunnels.

== Cast ==
- Don Terry as Larry Kent
- Gwen Gaze as Toni Morrell
- Walter Miller as Carter Collins ("The Shark")
- Grant Withers as Roderick Gridley
- George Rosener as Capt. Samuel Cuttle
- Hobart Bosworth as Dr. X
- Sandra Karina as Nurse Zanya
- Joe Caits as Salt Water Jerry
- Patrick J. Kelly as Professor Gault
- Yakima Canutt as Dreer, Leader of the Mole Men, Collins's slave diggers
- William Farnum as George Westmore, newspaper editor
- Dave O'Brien as Jameson, detective
- Warner Richmond as Captain Tom Faxton

== Production ==
Columbia announced plans to distribute the serial in a June 29, 1937 press release describing the studio's 1937-38 program. It was the third serial released by Columbia, and the first of five costume chapter plays. According to Columbia publicists, the story was updated from Robert Louis Stevenson's famous Treasure Island, adapted to fit the time period; L. Ron Hubbard asserted instead that he had adapted the screenplay from his original story Murder at Pirate Castle. An advertisement in the Motion Picture Herald described Hubbard as a "famous action writer, stunt pilot and world adventurer", and stated that he had written an "excitement-jammed yarn with one of the best boxoffice titles in years". After his work on The Secret of Treasure Island, L. Ron Hubbard also helped with the script for the 1941 Columbia movie serial, The Spider Returns.

Columbia assigned staff producer Jack Fier to oversee the Treasure Island project, but the film was actually produced by an independent company, Weiss Brothers. Louis Weiss hired motion picture pioneer Elmer Clifton to direct. Yakima Canutt and Dave O'Brien collaborated on the action sequences. The special effects (including the climactic eruption of a volcano and the destruction of the island) were handled by cameraman Kenneth Peach and explosives expert Earle Bunn.

Action star Don Terry, already under contract to Columbia, was assigned the leading role. The sinister master of the island was played by veteran serial star Walter Miller; he was a last-minute replacement for Bela Lugosi, whose acute sciatica condition forced him to withdraw from the production.

== Reception ==
The Secret of Treasure Island was exceptionally well received by fans, and helped to solidify Columbia's presence in the serial marketplace. A Film Daily editorial commented fondly on a screening in a theater: "Reminds us of the old Pearl White days -- when the chapter serials had the audience standing on the seats and yelling at the finish -- after witnessing the reaction of an audience at the Globe on Broadway as Columbia's The Secret of Treasure Island flashed before them. Cheers for the villain, as well as hoots and catcalls. The audience actually takes sides audibly -- gosh, that's great." The Film Daily reviewer wrote, "This serial has much to recommend it. The production has plenty of fights, an utterly fantastic plot, and even a ghost. The first three chapters are filled with what it takes." Variety liked the film's chances: "Secret of Treasure Island is stuffed with fist-fighting, rough and tumble action, and enough fright ingredients to keep the kids coming back for each episode. Don Terry, built up by Columbia's action product into a first-class fist swinger, gets into the thick of every struggle in the film and he handles the opposition with some back-breaking routines. [Serial] has many good suspensions to hang chapter closes on, and many of the episodal [sic] titles are attractive. Will prove a good bet in action houses."

A 1940 poll of exhibitors ranked short subjects and serials in order of audience popularity. The Secret of Treasure Island placed in the top 10 in the serial category, ranking at #6. (The winners, by large margins, were also Columbia serials: The Spider's Web and The Great Adventures of Wild Bill Hickok.)

Upon completion of The Secret of Treasure Island, Columbia Pictures ended its affiliation with the Weiss Brothers, opting to make its own serials. The Weiss Brothers were slated to produce The Great Adventures of Wild Bill Hickok, but Columbia took over the production.

== Revivals ==
The Secret of Treasure Island, unlike many of the older Columbia serials, was never re-released to theaters or television, and never officially issued on home video, making it one of the rarest serials today. It came out of the Columbia vaults only once, in 1952: it was reprinted on 16mm film for Columbia's nontheatrical library, and was made available to schools, libraries, community organizations, and film societies.

Six decades after its theatrical run, The Secret of Treasure Island was highlighted as part of "Serial Fest 2002" in Pennsylvania, which also included the serials Batman and Robin, Mysterious Doctor Satan, and The Adventures of Rex and Rinty. The serial was shown along with the 1922 Down to the Sea in Ships at the 2006 Memphis Film Festival, and in an article about the festival John Beifuss of The Commercial Appeal called the two serials "Elmer Clifton classics".

== Chapter titles ==
1. The Isle of Fear
2. The Ghost Talks
3. The Phantom Duel
4. Buried Alive
5. The Girl Who Vanished
6. Trapped by the Flood
7. The Cannon Roars
8. The Circle of Death
9. The Pirate's Revenge
10. The Crash
11. Dynamite
12. The Bridge of Doom
13. The Mad Flight
14. The Jaws of Destruction
15. Justice
