= I Cover the War! =

1937 film

I Cover the War
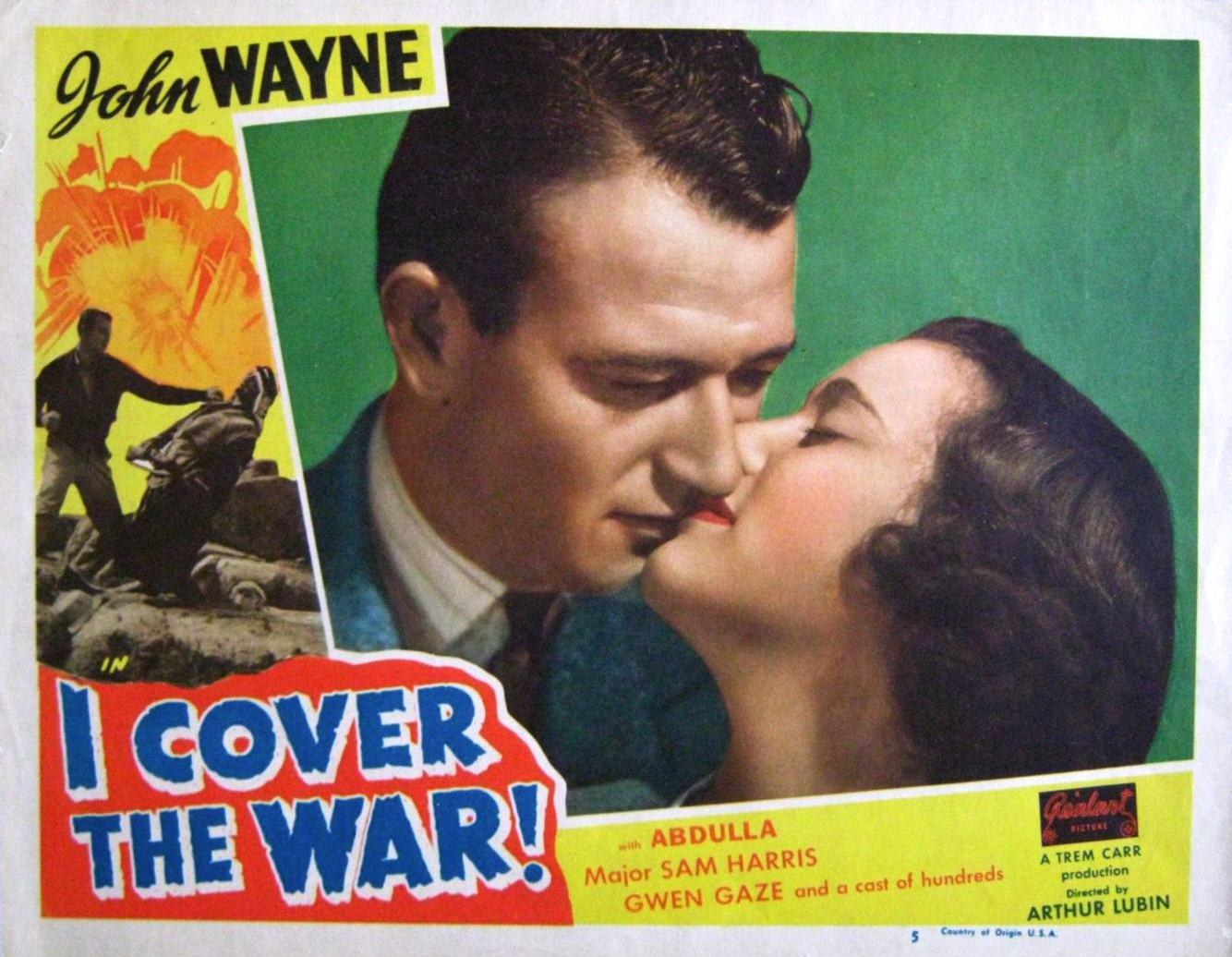
- Lobby card
- Directed by: Arthur Lubin
- Screenplay by: George Waggner
- Story by: Bernard McConville
- Produced by: Trem Carr; Paul Malvern
- Starring: John Wayne; Abdulla; Major Sam Harris; Gwen Gaze
- Cinematography: Stanley Cortez; Harry Neumann
- Edited by: Charles Craft; Erma Horsley
- Production company: Universal Pictures
- Distributed by: Universal Pictures
- Release date: July 4, 1937
- Running time: 68 minutes
- Country: United States
- Language: English

I Cover the War is a 1937 American drama action film directed by Arthur Lubin for Universal Pictures, starring John Wayne. It was one of a series of non-Westerns Wayne made for Universal.

== Plot ==
Two newsreel cameramen are sent to photograph a bandit sheik in the desert.

== Cast ==
- John Wayne as Bob Adams
- Gwen Gaze as Pamela Armitage
- Don Barclay as Elmer Davis
- Charles Brokaw as El Kadar / Muffadi
- James Bush as Don Adams
- Pat Somerset as Captain Archie Culvert
- Richard Tucker Army Officer
- Sam Harris as Colonel Hugh Armitage (as Major Sam Harris)
- Olaf Hytten as Sir Herbert
- Arthur Aylesworth as Logan
- Franklin Parker as Parker (as Franklyn Paker)

== Production ==
In February 1937 Trem Carr announced the film would start March 1.

== Reception ==
The New York Times called it an "ingeniously romantic fable".

Variety gave the film a negative review and described it as a "sketchy production with unimpressive backgrounds." It criticised the "unimaginative story" and commented that the "acting is uniformly stiff", but noted that the film "should prove to be dashingly appealing to juveniles" and would find an audience who are "not particular about their kind of entertainment."

== See also ==
- John Wayne filmography
