= Dick Ross =

American baseball player

- Outfielder

Negro league baseball debut
- 1925, for the St. Louis Stars

Last appearance
- 1926, for the St. Louis Stars

Teams
- St. Louis Stars (1925–1926)

Dick Ross is an American former Negro league outfielder who played in the 1920s.

Ross made his Negro leagues debut with the St. Louis Stars in 1925 and played with the Stars again the following season. In 22 recorded games with St. Louis, he batted .318 with one home run.
