= Ray "Crash" Corrigan =

American actor (1902–1976)

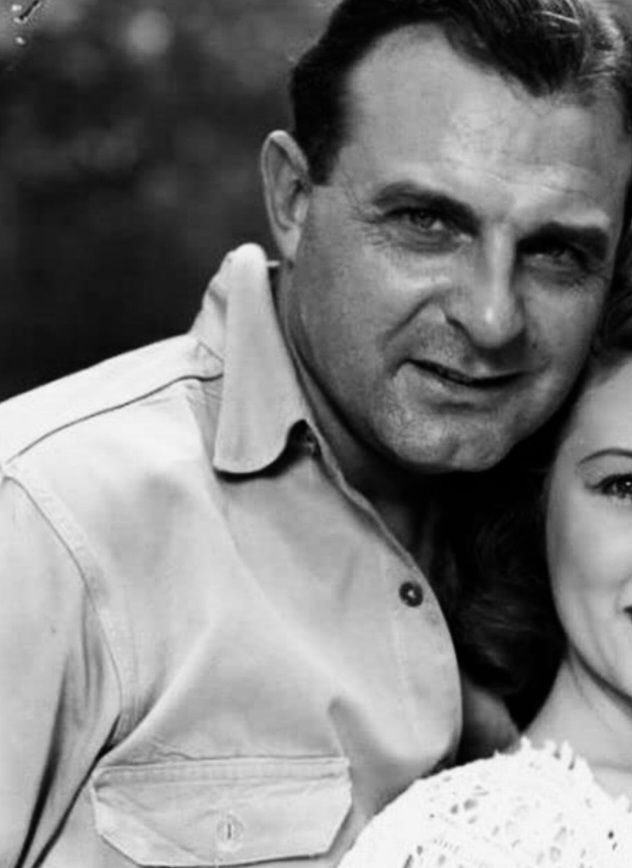
- Corrigan in The White Gorilla (1945)
- Born: Raymond Benitz; February 14, 1902; Milwaukee, Wisconsin, U.S.
- Died: August 10, 1976 (aged 74); Brookings, Oregon, U.S.
- Resting place: Inglewood Park Cemetery, California
- Other names: Raymond Benard; Ray Benard; Gorilla
- Occupation: Actor
- Years active: 1932–1958
- Spouses: Rita Jane Smeal (m. 1920; div. 1954) Elaine DuPont (m. 1956; div. 1967)
- Children: 3

Ray "Crash" Corrigan (born Raymond Benitz; February 14, 1902 – August 10, 1976) was an American actor most famous for appearing in many B-Western movies (among these the Three Mesquiteers and The Range Busters film series). He also was a stuntman and frequently acted as silver screen gorillas using his own gorilla costumes.

In 1937, Corrigan purchased land in the Santa Susana Mountains foothills in Simi Valley and developed it into a movie ranch called "Corriganville". The movie ranch was used for location filming in film serials, feature films, and television shows, as well as for the performance of live western shows for tourists. Bob Hope later bought the ranch in 1966 and renamed it "Hopetown". It is now a Regional Park and nature preserve.

== Film career ==
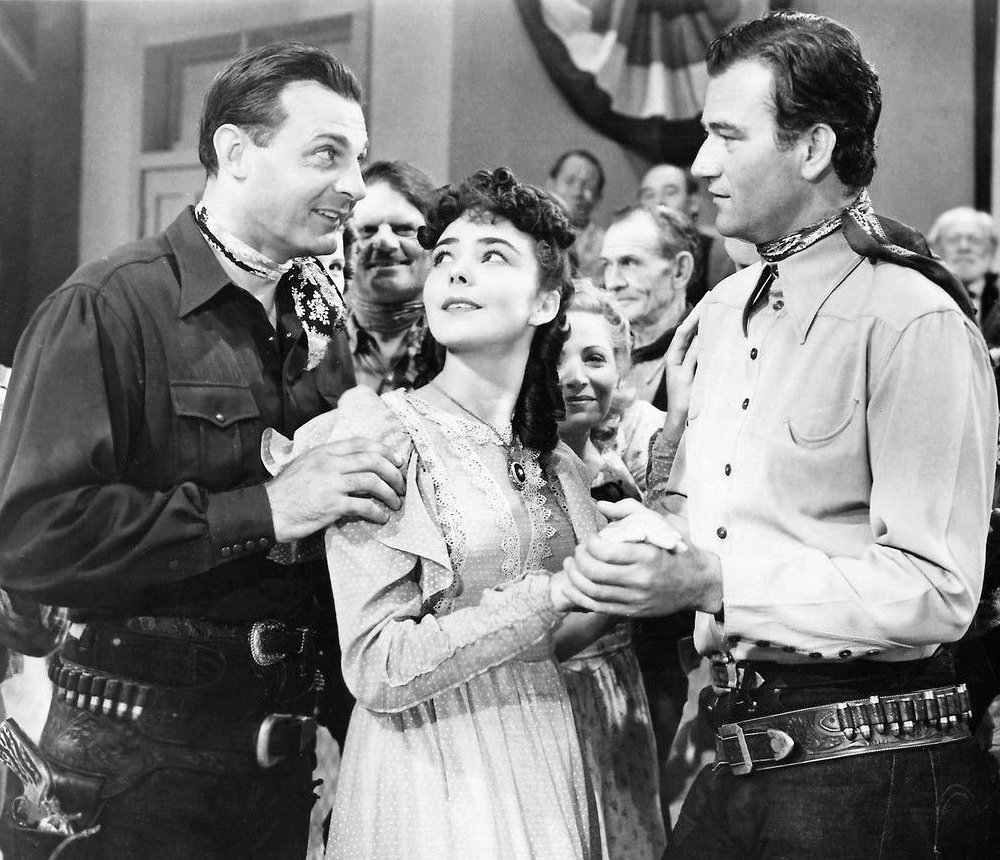
In New Frontier (1939), L-R: Corrigan, Jennifer Jones and John Wayne

Corrigan's Hollywood career began as a physical fitness instructor and physical culture trainer to the stars. In the early 1930s he did stunts and bit parts in several films, billed as Ray Benard. Many of his early roles were in ape costumes, for example, as a gorilla in Tarzan and His Mate (1934) and an "orangopoid" in the first Flash Gordon serial.

=== Republic Pictures ===
In 1936, Corrigan had his screen breakthrough with the starring role in a Republic serial, The Undersea Kingdom, which evoked memories of Universal's first "Flash Gordon" serial. His character was known as Ray "Crash" Corrigan, and he adopted it as his screen name. He followed playing the role of John C. Fremont in the Western serial The Vigilantes Are Coming.

On the basis of this, Republic signed him to their standard Term Player Contract, running from May 25, 1936, to May 24, 1938. He was cast as one of the trio in the Three Mesquiteers series of westerns, starring in 24 of the 51 "3M" films made by the studio. He later left Republic in 1938 over a pay dispute. Over at Monogram Pictures, Corrigan began a new series of feature westerns shot at Corriganville, The Range Busters, cheap knock-offs of The Three Mesquiteers, with a series character that used his name; between 1940 and 1943, he starred in 20 of the 24 films in this series.

=== Gorilla Man ===
Following this, his on-screen work largely returned to appearing in ape costumes, beginning with Three Missing Links (1938), followed by roles in The Strange Case of Doctor Rx (1942), Captive Wild Woman (1943), Nabonga (1944), White Pongo (1945) and as a prehistoric sloth in Unknown Island (1948). The original gorilla "mask" seen in films like The Ape (1940) was replaced with a subtler design with a more mobile jaw.

Corrigan sold his gorilla suits in 1948 and provided training in using them to their new owner, Steve Calvert, a Ciro's bartender. Calvert stepped into Corrigan's paw prints starting with a Jungle Jim film starring Johnny Weissmuller. Despite reports to the contrary, Calvert and Corrigan never appeared together on-screen in an ape costume. Since both Corrigan and Calvert eschewed screen credit playing gorillas, their film credits are often confused; any appearance of the "Corrigan suit" after 1948 is by Calvert.

His final theatrical film was playing the title role in the science fiction film It! The Terror from Beyond Space, according to bio information given to visitors at the Thousand Oaks, California, Corrigan's Steak House and Bar that his son Tom once owned.

=== Television series ===
In 1950, he had a television show called Crash Corrigan's Ranch. He also planned a television series called Buckskin Rangers with his old associate Max Terhune.

== Corriganville ==
In 1937, Corrigan was on a hunting trip with Clark Gable when he had an idea to purchase land in Simi Valley, California, and use it as a Western-themed ranch similar to Iverson Movie Ranch. He paid a $1,000 down payment, then a thousand dollars a month until the $11,354 price was paid. He developed this into Corriganville, a location used for many Western films and TV shows. The location featured many different types of terrain for producers such as lakes, mountains, and caves. Not merely set fronts, Corriganville contained actual buildings where film crews could live and store their equipment to save the time and expense of daily travel from studios to an outdoor location.

Corrigan profited well from renting this location to film studios and from paying visitors. In 1949, Corrigan opened his ranch to the public on weekends for Western-themed entertainment. The weekend attractions included stuntmen shows throughout the day, a Cavalry fort set, an outlaw shack, a full western town with saloon, jail, and hotel, live western music, Indian crafts, stagecoach rides, pony rides, and boating on the ranch's artificial lake. It was common for film and TV personalities to appear in person for photos and autographs, attracting as many as 20,000 people on weekends.

Examples of feature films and TV shows that were filmed at Corriganville:

- Drums of Fu Manchu (1939)
- Fort Apache (1948)
- The Lone Ranger (1949–1957)
- The Cisco Kid (1950–1956)
- The Adventures of Kit Carson (1951–1955)
- The Adventures of Rin Tin Tin (1954–1959)
- Have Gun – Will Travel (1957–1963)
- Casey Jones (1957)

Hollywood cowboy stars who filmed there include: Gene Autry, Roy Rogers, Buster Crabbe, John Wayne, Smiley Burnette, Clayton Moore, Jay Silverheels, Charles Starrett, Ken Maynard, Hoot Gibson, Bob Steele, Tex Ritter, and Corrigan himself.

Corriganville was eventually sold to Bob Hope in 1966, becoming Hopetown. Today, what remains is known as Corriganville Park and features some of the old landmarks. Signs along a hiking trail point out the historic features.

== Nickname ==
The origin of the "Crash" nickname is from his football-playing days. This was verified by Corrigan himself when he was a contestant on the June 11, 1959, episode of You Bet Your Life starring Groucho Marx. When asked how he got the name "Crash", Corrigan told Groucho, "When I would go to tackle somebody or instead of fighting them with my fists, I would just take off and dive at them head first and that's how I acquired the name 'Crash'".

His first starring role using the name professionally was in the Republic Pictures' serial The Undersea Kingdom (1936), in which his screen character was also named "Crash Corrigan". The serial was created to capitalize on the popularity of Universal Pictures' Flash Gordon serials, and the nickname may have been appropriated by Republic's publicity department to create a similarly named hero.

== Death ==
Following his death from a heart attack at age 74 on August 10, 1976, in Brookings Harbor, Oregon, Ray "Crash" Corrigan was interred at Inglewood Park Cemetery, Inglewood, California. More than four decades later, his grave still remains unmarked, without a headstone.

== Filmography ==
- Tarzan the Ape Man (1932) – Ape / Stuntman (uncredited)
- Tarzan and His Mate (1934) – Gorilla / Stuntman (uncredited)
- Hollywood Party (1934) – Ping Pong the Gorilla (uncredited)
- Murder in the Private Car (1934) – Naba the Gorilla (uncredited)
- Tomorrow's Children (1934) – Intern (uncredited)
- Romance in the Rain (1934) – (uncredited)
- The Phantom Empire (1935, Serial) – Thunder Rider (uncredited)
- Night Life of the Gods (1935) – Apollo
- She (1935) – Guard (uncredited)
- Dante's Inferno (1935) – Devil (uncredited)
- Mutiny on the Bounty (1935) – Able Bodied Seaman (uncredited)
- The Singing Vagabond (1935) – Private Hobbs (uncredited)
- Darkest Africa (1936, Serial) – Bonga / Samabi (uncredited)
- The Leathernecks Have Landed (1936) – Officer of the Day (uncredited)
- Flash Gordon (1936, Serial) – Orangopoid / Stuntman (uncredited)
- Undersea Kingdom (1936, Serial) – Crash Corrigan
- Kelly the Second (1936) – Fight Arena Doorman (uncredited)
- The Vigilantes Are Coming (1936) – Captain John Charles Fremont, US Army Captain (uncredited)
- The Three Mesquiteers (1936) – Tucson Smith
- Ghost-Town Gold (1936) – Tucson Smith
- Country Gentlemen (1936) – Briggs
- Roarin' Lead (1936) – Tucson Smith
- Riders of the Whistling Skull (1937) – Tucson Smith
- Join the Marines (1937) – Lt. Hodge
- Round-Up Time in Texas (1937) – Gorilla (uncredited)
- Hit the Saddle (1937) – Tucson Smith
- Gunsmoke Ranch (1937) – Tucson Smith
- Come on, Cowboys (1937) – Tucson Smith
- The Painted Stallion (1937) – Clark Stuart
- Range Defenders (1937) – Tucson Smith
- Heart of the Rockies (1937) – Tucson Smith
- The Trigger Trio (1937) – Tucson Smith
- Wild Horse Rodeo (1937) – Tucson Smith
- The Purple Vigilantes (1938) – Tucson Smith
- Call the Mesquiteers (1938) – Tucson Smith
- Outlaws of Sonora (1938) – Tucson Smith
- Riders of the Black Hills (1938) – Tucson Smith
- Three Missing Links (1938, Short) – Naba, the Gorilla
- Heroes of the Hills (1938) – Tucson Smith
- Pals of the Saddle (1938) – Tucson Smith
- Overland Stage Raiders (1938) – Tucson Smith
- Santa Fe Stampede (1938) – Tucson Smith
- Red River Range (1938) – Tucson Smith
- The Night Riders (1939) – Tucson Smith
- Three Texas Steers (1939) – Tucson Smith / Willie the Gorilla
- Wyoming Outlaw (1939) – Tucson Smith
- New Frontier (1939) – Tucson Smith
- The Range Busters (1940) – 'Crash' Corrigan
- The Ape (1940) – Nabu the Gorilla (uncredited)
- Trailing Double Trouble (1940) – 'Crash' Corrigan
- West of Pinto Basin (1940) – 'Crash' Corrigan
- Trail of the Silver Spurs (1941) – Crash Corrigan
- The Kid's Last Ride (1941) – Crash Corrigan
- Tumbledown Ranch in Arizona (1941) – Crash Corrigan
- Wrangler's Roost (1941) – Crash Corrigan
- Fugitive Valley (1941) – Crash Corrigan
- Saddle Mountain Roundup (1941) – Crash Corrigan
- Tonto Basin Outlaws (1941) – Crash Corrigan
- Underground Rustlers (1941) – Crash Corrigan
- Thunder River Feud (1942) – 'Crash' Corrigan
- Rock River Renegades (1942) – 'Crash' Corrigan
- The Strange Case of Doctor Rx (1942) – Nbongo the Gorilla (uncredited)
- Boot Hill Bandits (1942) – Marshal 'Crash' Corrigan
- Texas Trouble Shooters (1942) – 'Crash' Corrigan
- Arizona Stage Coach (1942) – Crash Corrigan
- Dr. Renault's Secret (1942) – Ape (uncredited)
- Dizzy Detectives (1943) - Bonzo the Gorilla (uncredited)
- Land of Hunted Men (1943) – 'Crash' Corrigan
- Cowboy Commandos (1943) – Crash Corrigan
- Captive Wild Woman (1943) – Cheela the Gorilla (uncredited)
- Black Market Rustlers (1943) – 'Crash' Corrigan
- Bullets and Saddles (1943) – 'Crash' Corrigan
- She's for Me (1943) – Gorilla Man
- The Phantom (1944, Serial) – Brutus the Gorilla (uncredited)
- Nabonga (1944) – Gorilla
- The Monster Maker (1944) – Gorilla (uncredited)
- The Hairy Ape (1944) – Goliath the Gorilla (uncredited)
- The Monster and the Ape (1945) – Thor (uncredited)
- The White Gorilla (1945) – Steve Collins / Konga – the White Gorilla / Narrator
- White Pongo (1945) – White Pongo (uncredited)
- Renegade Girl (1946) – William Quantrill
- Miraculous Journey (1948) – Gorilla (uncredited)
- Unknown Island (1948) – Monster (uncredited)
- Crime on Their Hands (1948) – Gorilla (uncredited)
- The Lost Tribe (1949) – Simba the Gorilla (uncredited)
- Zamba (1949) – Zamba the Gorilla
- The Adventures of Sir Galahad (1949) – One-Eye (Innkeeper) / Stuntman
- Forbidden Jungle (1950) – Gege the Gorilla (uncredited)
- Crash Corrigan's Ranch (1950, TV Series) – Host
- Trail of Robin Hood (1950) – Crash Corrigan
- Bela Lugosi Meets a Brooklyn Gorilla (1952) – Gorilla (uncredited)
- The Great Adventures of Captain Kidd (1953) – Docklin (uncredited)
- Killer Ape (1953) – Norley
- Man with the Steel Whip (1954, Serial) – Painted Stallion Character (archive footage) (uncredited)
- Apache Ambush (1955) – Hank Calvin
- Zombies of Mora Tau (1957) – Sailor
- Domino Kid (1957) – Buck (uncredited)
- The Bride and the Beast (1958) – Spanky (the wife-stealing gorilla) (uncredited)
- It! The Terror from Beyond Space (1958) – It
