= David Sharpe (actor) =

American actor (1910–1980)

Dave Sharpe
- Born: David Hardin Sharpe; February 2, 1910; St. Louis, Missouri, U.S.
- Died: March 30, 1980 (aged 70); Altadena, California, U.S.
- Occupation(s): Stunt performer, actor
- Years active: 1922–1978
- Spouse(s): Jean Allen (?-?); Gertrude Messinger (April 1932 - May 1935; divorced); Thelma Mae Crawford (January 1949 - April 1952; divorced); Mary Lou Dix, aka Mary Louise Wolfe (1956-?)
- Children: 1

David Hardin Sharpe (February 2, 1910 – March 30, 1980) was an American actor and stunt performer, sometimes billed as Davy Sharpe.

== Biography ==
Sharpe's father was Harry Sharpe, a fight referee in St. Louis.

Sharpe won the US National Tumbling Championship in 1925 and 1926. He began his film career as a child actor in the 1920s. Eventually he became the "Ramrod" (stunt coordinator) for Republic Pictures from 1939 until mid-1942 when the USA entered World War II. He was replaced in this role by Tom Steele while Sharpe joined the Army Air Corps in 1943.

== Personal life and death ==
Sharpe married film actress Gertrude Messinger in 1932. He died in 1980, aged 70, of Lou Gehrig's disease (some sources cited Parkinson's disease).

== Recognition ==
In 1979, Sharpe received the Yakima Canutt Award, which honors stuntmen. Sharpe was inducted into the Stuntman's Hall of Fame in 1980.

== Selected filmography ==
- Air Tight (1931)
- Call a Cop! (1931)
- Too Many Women (1932)
- Social Error (1935)
- Adventurous Knights (1935)
- Ghost Town (1936)
- Idaho Kid (1936)
- Desert Justice (1936)
- Santa Fe Rides (1937)
- Melody of the Plains (1937)
- Galloping Dynamite (1937)
- Where Trails Divide (1937)
- Young Dynamite (1937)
- Daredevils of the Red Circle (1939)
- Dick Tracy Returns (1938)
- Man's Country (1938)
- Covered Wagon Trails (1940)
- Mutiny in the Arctic (1941)
- Silver Stallion (1941)
- Texas to Bataan (1942)
- Trail Riders (1942)
- Two Fisted Justice (1943)
- Haunted Ranch (1943)
- The Good Humor Man (1950)
