= Steve Clark (actor) =

American actor (1891–1954)

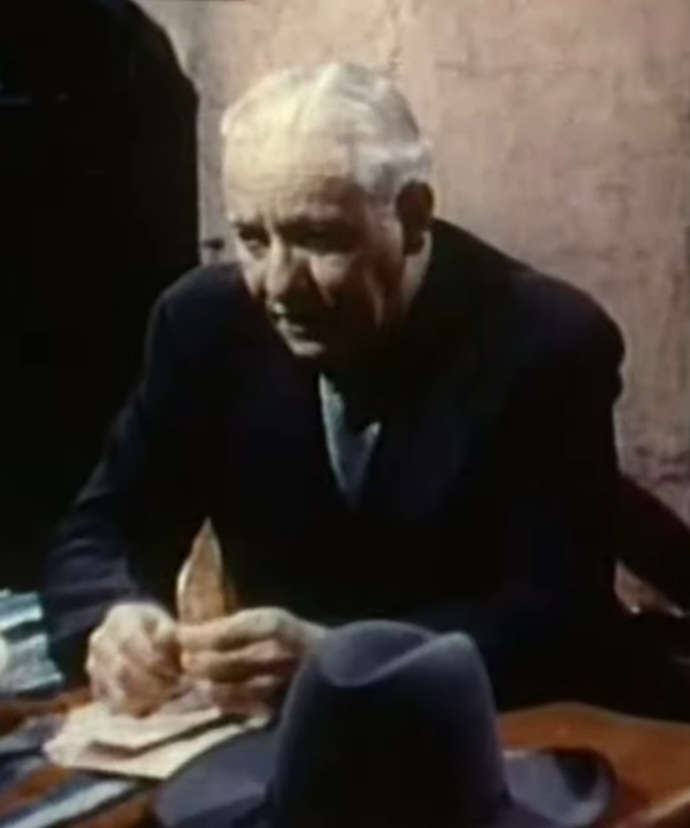
- Clark in Under California Stars (1948)
- Born: Elmer Stephen Clark; February 26, 1891; Daviess County, Indiana, U.S.
- Died: June 29, 1954 (aged 63); Van Nuys, Los Angeles, California, U.S.
- Resting place: Valhalla Memorial Park Cemetery
- Occupation: Actor
- Years active: 1909–1954
- Spouse(s): Ruth Clark (m. 19??; div. 19??); Emily Margaret Clark (m. 19??

Elmer Stephen Clark (February 26, 1891 – June 29, 1954) was an American actor. He is best known for playing sheriff roles in movies and television. Prior to 1933 he had been a stage actor, director and manager since 1909.

== Biography ==
Clark was born February 1891 in Daviess County, Indiana. He married Ruth Clark and later to Emily Margaret Clark. Clark died June 1954 in Van Nuys, Los Angeles, California. He was buried in Valhalla Memorial Park, Los Angeles County, California.

== Filmography ==
=== Film ===
Year	Title	Role	Notes
1933	Silent Men	Cowhand Parker	(uncredited)
1933	Rusty Rides Alone	Bill - Martin's Foreman	(uncredited)
1933	Hold the Press	Copy Desk Editor	(uncredited)
1934	The Man Trailer	Sheriff Dave Bishop	(uncredited)
1934	Voice in the Night	Devlin - Lookout	(uncredited)
1934	Whom the Gods Destroy	Communications Man	(uncredited)
1934	Beyond the Law	Radion Operator O'Hara	(uncredited)
1934	Ridin' Gents	Attorney	(uncredited, short)
1934	Girl in Danger	Headwaiter	(uncredited)
1934	6 Day Bike Rider	Doctor	(uncredited)
1934	Against the Law	Undetermined Role	(uncredited)
1934	The Prescott Kid	Crocker	
1934	Mystery Mountain	Construction Worker	(uncredited)
1934	The Westerner	Henchman	(uncredited)
1935	Behind the Evidence	Gangster	(uncredited)
1935	Square Shooter	Henchman Pete	
1935	North of Arizona	Steve - Bartender	(uncredited)
1935	Law Beyond the Range	Townsman	(uncredited)
1935	The Whole Town's Talking	Convict	(uncredited)
1935	Behind the Green Lights	Court Clerk	(uncredited)
1935	The Revenge Rider	Murphy	(uncredited)
1935	I'll Love You Always	Bill Collector	(uncredited)
1935	Fighting Shadows	Trapper	(uncredited)
1935	Toll of the Desert	Drover	(uncredited)
1935	Men of the Hour	Waiter	(uncredited)
1935	Air Hawks	Reporter	(uncredited)
1935	The Awakening of Jim Burke	Workman	(uncredited)
1935	The Laramie Kid	Sheriff	(uncredited)
1935	Lightning Triggers	Henchman	(uncredited)
1935	Danger Trails	Marshal Hopkins	
1935	Tumbling Tumbleweeds	Cowhand	(uncredited)
1935	No Man's Range	George Brady	
1935	Frontier Justice	George Brady	(uncredited)
1935	The Rider of the Law	Doc Tolliver	(uncredited)
1935	Alias John Law	Simi - Henchman	
1935	One-Way Ticket	Guard	(uncredited)
1935	Super-Speed	Superintendent	(uncredited)
1935	Texas Jack	Sheriff	(uncredited)
1936	Gun Smoke	Trapper	(uncredited)
1936	Valley of the Lawless	Settler	(uncredited)
1936	Hell-Ship Morgan	Bartender	(uncredited)
1936	The Lawless Nineties	Henchman	(uncredited)
1936	Song of the Saddle	Man in Stagecoach	(uncredited)
1936	Border Caballero	Uniformed Show Performer	(uncredited)
1936	Desert Phantom	Steve - Bartender	(uncredited)
1936	Caryl of the Mountains	Capt. Edwards	
1936	Comin' Round the Mountain	Man at Relay Station	(uncredited)
1936	Mr. Deeds Goes to Town	Reporter	(uncredited)
1936	Roamin' Wild	Captured Robber	(uncredited)
1936	Last of the Warrens	Henchman Spike	
1936	The Golden Arrow	Reporter	(uncredited)
1936	Too Much Beef	Prosecutor	
1936	Cavalcade of the West	John Knox	(as Steve Clarke)
1936	The Phantom of the Range	Henchman	(uncredited)
1937	The Gambling Terror	Mac McClure - the Bar Owner	(uncredited)
1937	Santa Fe Rides	Henchman 'Red'	(uncredited)
1937	The Silver Trail	Tom	
1937	Feud of the Trail	Cattleman Robbed by Jack Granger	(uncredited)
1937	Trail of Vengeance	Bill - Tilden's Foreman	(uncredited)
1937	Hittin' the Trail	Townsman	(uncredited)
1937	Mystery Range	Rustler	(uncredited)
1937	Guns in the Dark	Pete Small	
1937	Gun Lords of Stirrup Basin	Hammond - Rancher	
1937	Two-Fisted Sheriff	Red	(uncredited)
1937	A Lawman Is Born	Sam Brownlee	
1937	One Man Justice	Texas Rider	(uncredited)
1937	Flying Fists	2nd Ring Announcer	(uncredited)
1937	Riders of the Dawn	Barfly	(uncredited)
1937	Boothill Brigade	Rancher Holbrook	
1937	Heroes of the Alamo	Frank Hunter	
1937	Western Gold	Carl	(uncredited)
1937	Ridin' the Lone Trail	Sheriff Carson	
1937	Arizona Gunfighter	Sheriff	
1937	Moonlight on the Range	Steve	(uncredited)
1937	Where Trails Divide	Henchman Wheezer	
1937	Hollywood Round-Up	Deputy	(uncredited)
1937	The Old Wyoming Trail	Deputy Gabe	(uncredited)
1937	Outlaws of the Prairie	Cobb	
1937	Courage of the West	Henchman	(uncredited)
1937	Romance of the Rockies	Deputy	
1938	Paroled – To Die	Sheriff Blackman	(uncredited)
1943	Under California Stars	Sheriff	
1948	Hidden Danger	Russell	
1952	Night Stage to Galveston	Old Ranger	(uncredited)
1952	The Gunman	Seth - Storekeeper	(uncredited)
1953	Cow Country	Skeeter	
1953	Ambush at Tomahawk Gap	Prison Wagon Driver	(uncredited)
1953	The Marshal's Daughter	Rancher	(uncredited)
1953	El Paso Stampede	Jim Stevens	(uncredited)

=== Television ===
Year	Title	Role	Notes
1949–1952	The Lone Ranger	Warden/Tug Spencer/Rufe Watson/Sheriff Bill Hoskins	5 episodes
1950–1954	The Cisco Kid	Multiple roles	11 episodes
1951–1953	The Range Rider	Multiple roles	13 episodes
1952	The Gene Autry Show	Pete Munroe / Sheriff Daniel Kincaid	2 episodes
1952	Adventures of Wild Bill Hickok	Doctor	1 episode
1952	The Unexpected		1 episode
1954	Hopalong Cassidy	Marshal Tighe	1 episode
