= Boot Hill Bandits =

1942 film by S. Roy Luby

- Film poster
- Directed by: S. Roy Luby
- Written by: George Arthur Durlam
- Produced by: Anna Bell Ward (associate producer); George W. Weeks (producer)
- Cinematography: Robert E. Cline
- Edited by: S. Roy Luby
- Music by: Frank Sanucci
- Distributed by: Monogram Pictures
- Release date: 24 April 1942
- Running time: 58 minutes
- Country: United States
- Language: English

Boot Hill Bandits is a 1942 American Western film directed by S. Roy Luby. The film is the fourteenth in the Monogram Pictures produced "Range Busters" series. It stars Ray "Crash" Corrigan as Crash, John "Dusty" King as Dusty and Max Terhune as Alibi, with Jean Brooks, John Merton and Glenn Strange.

== Plot ==
In Boot Hill Bandits, the Range Busters-Crash, Dusty, and Alibi, investigate a series of crimes linked to the explosion of a payroll wagon and a stolen marshal's badge. Crash Corrigan, believed to be dead after the blast, survives and goes undercover to uncover the true leader behind the outlaw gang. As the trio works together to restore order, they face deception, danger, and a final confrontation with the mastermind pulling the strings.

== Cast ==
- Ray Corrigan as Marshal "Crash" Corrigan
- John 'Dusty' King as "Dusty" King
- Max Terhune as "Alibi" Terhune
- Elmer as Elmer, Alibi's Dummy
- Jean Brooks as May Meadows
- John Merton as Brand Bolton
- Glenn Strange as The Maverick
- I. Stanford Jolley as The Mesquite Kid
- Steve Clark as Sheriff Jed Tolliver
- George Chesebro as Henchman "Stack" Stoner
- Richard Cramer as "Corn" Hawkins - Bartender
- Budd Buster as Mayor Noah Smyth
- Milburn Morante as Cameron
- Jimmy Aubrey as The Drunk
