= S. Roy Luby =

American film animator, editor and director

- Born: August 8, 1904; New York City, United States
- Died: August 19, 1976 (aged 72); Los Angeles, California, United States
- Occupations: Animator, editor, director

Solomon Roy Luby (August 8, 1904 – August 19, 1976) was an American animator, editor, and film director. He used the pseudonyms of Roy Claire, Roy S. Luby, J. Roy Luby, Roy Luby, Sol Luby, and Russell Roy.

== Biography ==
Luby attended City College of New York then worked as an architect and a chemist. He directed small theatre groups in Greenwich Village and worked as a cartoonist.

== Animation ==
In 1918, he became an associate producer of the Out of the Inkwell cartoons for Max Fleischer and Mutt and Jeff cartoons for Bud Fisher. Luby continued with animation until 1931 when he became a live action film editor beginning with Shotgun Pass.

== B Westerns ==
Luby became a prolific editor for a variety of low budget Westerns for minor studios becoming a director in 1934 with Range Warfare.

He moved to Monogram Pictures in 1937 directing the first of the Range Busters series in 1940. He gave up feature film directing in 1943 to concentrate on editing for films and later television, becoming a supervising editor on several television shows for Roland D. Reed (a fellow former B Western editor and director) Productions such as My Little Margie and Rocky Jones, Space Ranger. However, he did direct several episodes of The Adventures of Wild Bill Hickok.

== Christian films ==
Beginning in 1949, Luby worked as a supervising editor and associate producer for several Christian film companies such as Family Films, Inc.

== Selected filmography ==
- The Pocatello Kid (1931)
- Law and Lawless (1932)
- Battling Buckaroo (1932)
- The Reckless Rider (1932)
- Guns for Hire (1932)
- The Texas Tornado (1932)
- Via Pony Express (1933)
- Her Splendid Folly (1933)
- Trouble Busters (1933)
- Gun Law (1933)
- The Woman Condemned (1934)
- The Man from Hell (1934)
- Fighting Through (1934)
- The Brand of Hate (1934)
- Frontier Days (1934)
- Ticket to a Crime (1934)
- Big Calibre (1935)
- The Cyclone Ranger (1935)
- Arizona Bad Man (1935)
- Outlaw Rule (1935)
- The Cheyenne Tornado (1935)
- Lightning Triggers (1935)
- Blazing Guns (1935)
- The Gambling Terror (1937)
- Border Phantom (1937)
- Race Suicide (1938 film)
- The Feud Maker (1938)
- Crashing Thru (1939)
- Wild Horse Valley (1940)
- Black Market Rustlers (1943)
- Reaching from Heaven (1948)
- The Pilgrimage Play (1949)
- Venture of Faith (1951)
