= Sin's Pay Day =

1932 film

- Poster using the films alternative title
- Directed by: George B. Seitz
- Written by: Betty Burbridge; Gene Morgan
- Produced by: Ralph M. Like; Cliff P. Broughton
- Starring: Lloyd Whitlock; Dorothy Revier; Mickey Rooney
- Cinematography: Jules Cronjager
- Edited by: Byron Robinson
- Production company: Action Pictures
- Distributed by: Mayfair Pictures
- Release date: March 1, 1932
- Running time: 61 minutes
- Country: United States
- Language: English

Sin's Pay Day is a 1932 American pre-Code crime film directed by George B. Seitz and starring Lloyd Whitlock, Dorothy Revier and Mickey Rooney. It was produced on Poverty Row as a second feature. It was later reissued under the alternative title Slums of New York with advertising material devoting greater attention to child actor Rooney, who had since emerged as a star at MGM.

== Plot ==
Attorney Robert Webb makes a good living as a defense lawyer for gangsters. This disgusts his wife, who leaves him and goes to set up a charitable clinic. After getting a notorious mob leader acquitted on a technicality, Webb develops a conscience and turns to alcohol letting his practice collapse. Living on the streets, he is befriended by a boy who helps him gain his self-respect. When the boy is then killed by a bullet fired from a gangster's gun, Webb goes undercover to pose as a defense lawyer once more while secretly recording the incriminating conversation, which he turns over to the police. A reformed man, he and his wife reconcile.

== Cast ==
- Lloyd Whitlock as Robert Webb
- Dorothy Revier as Iris Markey
- Mickey Rooney as Chubby Dennis
- Forrest Stanley as James Markey
- Bess Flowers as Jane Webb
- Hal Price as Jake Bernheim
- Harry Semels as Louie Joe
- Paul Panzer as Derelict Drinking Milk

== Bibliography ==
- Pitts, Michael R. Poverty Row Studios, 1929–1940: An Illustrated History of 55 Independent Film Companies, with a Filmography for Each. McFarland & Company, 2005.
