= Sally of the Subway =

1932 film

- Directed by: George B. Seitz
- Written by: George B. Seitz
- Produced by: Ralph M. Like; Cliff P. Broughton
- Starring: Jack Mulhall; Dorothy Revier; Blanche Mehaffey
- Cinematography: Jules Cronjager
- Edited by: Byron Robinson
- Production company: Action Pictures
- Distributed by: Mayfair Pictures
- Release date: January 15, 1932
- Running time: 63 minutes
- Country: United States
- Language: English

Sally of the Subway is a 1932 American pre-Code crime film directed by George B. Seitz and starring Jack Mulhall, Dorothy Revier and Blanche Mehaffey. It was produced as a second feature for release by Mayfair Pictures.

== Plot ==
A gang of jewel thieves use an exiled member of German royalty as an unwitting part of their scheme to rob a major New York jewellery company. Fortunately he is tipped off by one of the store's workers and he is able to turn the tables on the gang.

== Cast ==
- Jack Mulhall as Ludwig
- Dorothy Revier as Sally
- Blanche Mehaffey as Angela
- Huntley Gordon as Gordon
- Harry Semels as Von Trump
- Crauford Kent as Moffit
- John Webb Dillion as McMillan, Henchman
- William P. Burt as Scraggs, Henchman
- George 'Gabby' Hayes as Police Lieutenant Paxton
- Ellinor Vanderveer as Mrs. Stubbs
- Bob Reeves as Bill, Police Officer
- Julia Griffith as Miss Duncan, Credit Manager

== Bibliography ==
- Pitts, Michael R. Poverty Row Studios, 1929–1940: An Illustrated History of 55 Independent Film Companies, with a Filmography for Each. McFarland & Company, 2005.
