= First Aid (film) =

1931 crime drama film directed by Stuart Paton

- Directed by: Stuart Paton
- Written by: Michael L. Simmons (dialogue)
- Produced by: Ralph M. Like
- Starring: Grant Withers <Marjorie Beebe; Wheeler Oakman
- Cinematography: Jules Cronjager
- Edited by: Carl Himm
- Production company: Ralph M. Like, Ltd.
- Distributed by: Sono Art-World Wide Pictures
- Release date: August 18, 1931
- Running time: 60 minutes
- Country: United States
- Language: English
- Box office: "Under $700"

First Aid is a 1931 American pre-Code crime film directed by Stuart Paton. Produced by Ralph M. Like, the film was released on 5 July 1931 and was distributed by Sono Art-World Wide Pictures. First Aid was filmed in Santa Monica, California. Some scenes were filmed at the Bon Ton Ballroom.

== Plot ==
Ralph Ingram, a brain specialist whose alcoholism has ruined his career, tries to regain his reputation while working with an ambulance team. He is in love with Lil Hollins, who works as a taxi dancer, but Lil's boss, Michael Rush, is also in love with her.

== Cast ==
- Grant Withers as Ralph Ingram
- Marjorie Beebe as Lil Hollins
- Wheeler Oakman as Michael Rush
- Donald Keith as Buddy Hollins
- William Desmond as the Chief of police
- Paul Panzer as Whitey
- Ernie Adams as Joe
- George Chesebro as Swank
- Harry Shutan as Jake
- Billy Gilbert as Jenkins

== Reception ==
A positive review from The Film Daily on 12 July 1931 stated: "Carries fast action punch with thrills and unique plot situation that makes popular fare. Good story treatment."
