= Justice Takes a Holiday =

1933 film

- Directed by: Spencer Gordon Bennet
- Screenplay by: John T. Neville
- Story by: Walter Merrill
- Produced by: Cliff P. Broughton; George W. Weeks; Ralph M. Like
- Starring: H. B. Warner; Patricia O'Brien; John Ince; Matty Kemp; Huntley Gordon; Audrey Ferris; Robert Frazer
- Cinematography: Jules Cronjager
- Edited by: Byron Robinson
- Production company: Golden Arrow Productions
- Distributed by: Mayfair Pictures
- Release date: April 18, 1933
- Running time: 68 minutes
- Country: United States
- Language: English

Justice Takes a Holiday is a 1933 American crime film directed by Spencer Gordon Bennet and written by John T. Neville. The film stars H. B. Warner, Patricia O'Brien, John Ince, Matty Kemp, Huntley Gordon, Audrey Ferris and Robert Frazer. The film was released on April 18, 1933, by Mayfair Pictures.

== Cast ==
- H. B. Warner as John Logan
- Patricia O'Brien as Margaret Logan
- John Ince as Warden
- Matty Kemp as Larry Harrison
- Huntley Gordon as Judge Martin Walker
- Audrey Ferris as Margaret Walker
- Robert Frazer as David Harrison
- Syd Saylor as 'Scoop' Jones

== Bibliography ==
- Katchmer, George A. Eighty Silent Film Stars: Biographies and Filmographies of the Obscure to the Well Known. McFarland, 1991.
- Pitts, Michael R. Poverty Row Studios, 1929–1940: An Illustrated History of 55 Independent Film Companies, with a Filmography for Each. McFarland & Company, 2005.
