= Passport to Paradise =

1932 film

- Film poster
- Directed by: George B. Seitz
- Written by: George B. Seitz
- Produced by: Ralph M. Like
- Starring: Jack Mulhall; Blanche Mehaffey; Eddie Phillips
- Cinematography: Jules Cronjager
- Edited by: Byron Robinson
- Production company: Action Pictures
- Distributed by: Mayfair Pictures; Butcher's Film Service (UK)
- Release date: April 1, 1932
- Running time: 67 minutes
- Country: United States
- Language: English

Passport to Paradise is a 1932 American pre-Code drama film directed by George B. Seitz and starring Jack Mulhall, Blanche Mehaffey and Eddie Phillips. It was produced as a second feature for release by the independent company Mayfair Pictures. Though the 67 minute film is considered lost, a 58 minute version of the film was released on DVD by the Alpha Home Entertainment label in 2012 under the alternate title "The Case Of The Black Pearl".

== Plot ==
As part of the terms's of his grandfather's will, Bob has to travel round the world with no money in order to claim his inheritance. He smuggles himself aboard a cruise ship where he is befriended by Elsa who he later discovers is an exiled princess.

== Cast ==
- Jack Mulhall as Bob
- Blanche Mehaffey as Elsa
- Eddie Phillips as Gordon Battle
- William P. Burt as Amos Turkle
- Gloria Joy as Norma
- John Ince as Ship's Captain

== Bibliography ==
- Pitts, Michael R. Poverty Row Studios, 1929–1940: An Illustrated History of 55 Independent Film Companies, with a Filmography for Each. McFarland & Company, 2005.
