= The Sky Spider =

1931 film

- Film poster
- Directed by: Richard Thorpe
- Written by: Grace Norton (story and scenario) (as Grace Neel Norton)
- Produced by: Ralph M. Like
- Starring: Glenn Tryon; Beryl Mercer; Blanche Mehaffey; Pat O'Malley; John Trent
- Cinematography: Jules Cronjager
- Edited by: Viola Roehl
- Production company: Action Pictures
- Distributed by: Mayfair Pictures
- Release date: June 23, 1931 (premiere)
- Running time: 69 minutes
- Country: United States
- Language: English

The Sky Spider (aka Spy Spider) is a 1931 American "youth-oriented" adventure film. Directed by Richard Thorpe, the film starred Glenn Tryon, Beryl Mercer, Blanche Mehaffey, Pat O'Malley and newcomer John Trent. (Note: John Trent playing a secondary role as a pilot, was a pilot for TWA prior to coming to Hollywood.)

== Plot ==
Glenn Morgan (Glenn Tryon), returning from Mexico to his mother (Beryl Mercer) and two brothers, Buddy (John Trent) and Jim (Pat O'Malley). Glenn also brings along his friend, Hugh Jeffries (Philo McCullough) who is extremely interested in the brothers' design for a fast fighter aircraft. The oldest brother, Jim, is in love with Barbara Hawton (Blanche Mehaffey), the daughter of his boss, Colonel Hawton (Joseph W. Girard). Glenn is also in love with Barbara so he does not want to hurt Jim's feelings. Flying air mail, Jim proposes to Barbara but she turns him down.

After Jim takes off, Jeffries and his crony Marsh (George Chesebro) intent on stealing the mail, follow and shoot down his aircraft. Jim's body is not found in the wreckage of the aircraft, and with the mail missing, Glenn fears Jim was murdered. Jeffries spreads the rumor that Jim has stole the mail.

Glenn returns to Mexico to investigate. Jim, meanwhile, has survived the crash in the being care of an old prospector (Jay Hunt) who is protecting his claim. When Jeffries learns Jim survived, he sends Marsh to drop a bomb on the prospector's cabin in order to eliminate the only witness to his part in the crime.

Jim and the prospector are saved by hiding in the mine. Glenn and Buddy set a trap for Jeffries, revealing a lot of money will be aboard the next air mail flight. Glenn follows in his new aircraft and shoots down Jeffries.

Rescuing Jim and the old prospector, Glenn then proposes to Barbara, and to show there are no hard feelings, Jim asks to be the best man at the wedding.

== Cast ==
- Glenn Tryon as Glenn Morgan
- Beryl Mercer as Mother Morgan
- Blanche Mehaffey as Barbara Hawton
- Pat O'Malley as Jim Morgan
- John Trent as Buddy Morgan
- Philo McCullough as Hugh Jeffries
- Jay Hunt as The Old Prospector
- Joseph W. Girard as Colonel Hawton (as Joe Girard)
- George Chesebro as Marsh

== Production ==
The Sky Spider was, according to film reviewer, Hans J. Wollstein, "a decidedly minor entry in the then-popular aviation melodrama cycle. 'The Sky Spider' was the first film produced by sound engineer Ralph M. Like's low-budget Action Pictures. Former silent screen juvenile Glenn Tryon and Pat O'Malley are sibling air mail pilots."

== Reception ==
Contemporary reviews of The Sky Spider noted that as a "bottom of the bill" B-film, there were many improbable scenes and "deficiencies in dialogue and acting". The incredible feat of "dropping a stick of dynamite from an aircraft, thousands of feet above, was one of the questionable feats."
