= The Widow in Scarlet =

1932 film

- Directed by: George B. Seitz
- Written by: Norman Battle
- Produced by: Ralph M. Like
- Starring: Dorothy Revier; Kenneth Harlan; Lloyd Whitlock
- Cinematography: Jules Cronjager
- Edited by: Byron Robinson
- Production company: Ralph M. Like Productions
- Distributed by: Mayfair Pictures
- Release date: July 1, 1932
- Running time: 64 minutes
- Country: United States
- Language: English

The Widow in Scarlet (also known as Lady Raffles) is a 1932 American pre-Code mystery crime film directed by George B. Seitz and starring Dorothy Revier, Kenneth Harlan and Lloyd Whitlock . It was distributed by the independent Mayfair Pictures.

== Plot ==
Baroness Orsani makes a bet that she can steal a friend's valuable diamond necklace just to prove that she can, intending to return it afterwards. Before she can accomplish this, a gang of international jewel thieves led by a man posing as a police inspector, steal it first.

== Cast ==
- Dorothy Revier as Baroness Orsani
- Kenneth Harlan as Peter Lawton-Bond
- Lloyd Whitlock as Mandel
- Glenn Tryon as Spuffy
- Myrtle Stedman as Alice Lawton-Bond
- Lloyd Ingraham as Bradley
- Harry Strang as Hymie
- Hal Price as Eddie
- Arthur Millett as Hanson
- Phillips Smalley as Peter's pal
- Wilfrid North as Peter's pal

== Production ==
The film was completed in just 8 days, finishing in May 1932.

== Bibliography ==
- Pitts, Michael R. Poverty Row Studios, 1929–1940: An Illustrated History of 55 Independent Film Companies, with a Filmography for Each. McFarland & Company, 2005.
