= Sea Fury =

Sea Fury may refer to:

- Hawker Sea Fury, a British fighter aircraft developed for the Royal Navy
- Sea Fury (1958 film), a British action film
- Sea Fury (1929 film), an American adventure film
