= Byron Robinson (film editor) =

American film editor (1900–1957)

- Born: January 20, 1900; Longview, Texas, US
- Died: February 25, 1957 (aged 57); Los Angeles, California, US
- Occupation: Film editor
- Years active: 1924–1939 (film)

Byron Robinson (January 20, 1900 – February 25, 1957) was an American film editor. He worked for a variety of studios including Tiffany Pictures, Universal Pictures, Mayfair Pictures and Columbia Pictures.

== Filmography ==
- The Devil's Partner (1926)
- Alias the Deacon (1927)
- Uncle Tom's Cabin (1927)
- Lingerie (1928)
- Domestic Meddlers (1928)
- The Power of Silence (1928)
- Midnight Rose (1928)
- The Albany Night Boat (1928)
- Broadway Fever (1929)
- The Shannons of Broadway (1929)
- The Medicine Man (1930)
- Borrowed Wives (1930)
- Paradise Island (1930)
- Chinatown After Dark (1931)
- Anybody's Blonde (1931)
- Dragnet Patrol (1931)
- Night Beat (1931)
- Soul of the Slums (1931)
- Graft (1931)
- Dynamite Denny (1932)
- The Monster Walks (1932)
- The Midnight Warning (1932)
- Gorilla Ship (1932)
- Tangled Destinies (1932)
- Sally of the Subway (1932)
- Temptation's Workshop (1932)
- Docks of San Francisco (1932)
- Passport to Paradise (1932)
- Love in High Gear (1932)
- The Widow in Scarlet (1932)
- Sin's Pay Day (1932)
- Behind Stone Walls (1932)
- No Living Witness (1932)
- Sister to Judas (1932)
- Alias Mary Smith (1932)
- Malay Nights (1932)
- Her Mad Night (1932)
- Midnight Morals (1932)
- Easy Millions (1933)
- The Big Bluff (1933)
- Justice Takes a Holiday (1933)
- Dance Hall Hostess (1933)
- Three Kids and a Queen (1935)
- Come Closer, Folks (1936)
- Crash Donovan (1936)
- The Man Who Lived Twice (1936)
- Paid to Dance (1937)
- Motor Madness (1937)
- Girls Can Play (1937)
- Woman in Distress (1937)
- The Shadow (1937)
- Who Killed Gail Preston? (1938)
- Juvenile Court (1938)
- Romance of the Redwoods (1939)
- A Woman Is the Judge (1939)

== Bibliography ==
- Pitts, Michael R. Poverty Row Studios, 1929–1940: An Illustrated History of 55 Independent Film Companies, with a Filmography for Each. McFarland & Company, 2005.
