= Sister to Judas =

1932 film

- Directed by: E. Mason Hopper
- Written by: John T. Neville; Watkins E. Wright
- Produced by: Ralph M. Like; George W. Weeks
- Starring: Claire Windsor; Holmes Herbert; John Harron
- Cinematography: Jules Cronjager
- Edited by: Byron Robinson
- Production company: Ralph M. Like Productions
- Distributed by: Mayfair Pictures; Butcher's Film Service (UK)
- Release date: December 26, 1932
- Running time: 65 minutes
- Country: United States
- Language: English

Sister to Judas is a 1932 American pre-Code drama film directed by E. Mason Hopper and starring Claire Windsor, Holmes Herbert and John Harron.

== Cast ==
- Claire Windsor as Anne Fane
- Holmes Herbert as Bruce Rogers
- John Harron as Ronnie Ross
- Lee Moran as Percy Fane
- David Callis as Elmer Fane
- Wilfred Lucas as Mike O'Flanagan
- Stella Adams as Mrs. Fane
- Virginia True Boardman as Mrs. Helen Ross
- Dorothy Vernon as Tenement Resident in Hallway

== Bibliography ==
- Michael R. Pitts. Poverty Row Studios, 1929–1940: An Illustrated History of 55 Independent Film Companies, with a Filmography for Each. McFarland & Company, 2005.
