= George Regas =

Greek-American actor (1890–1940)

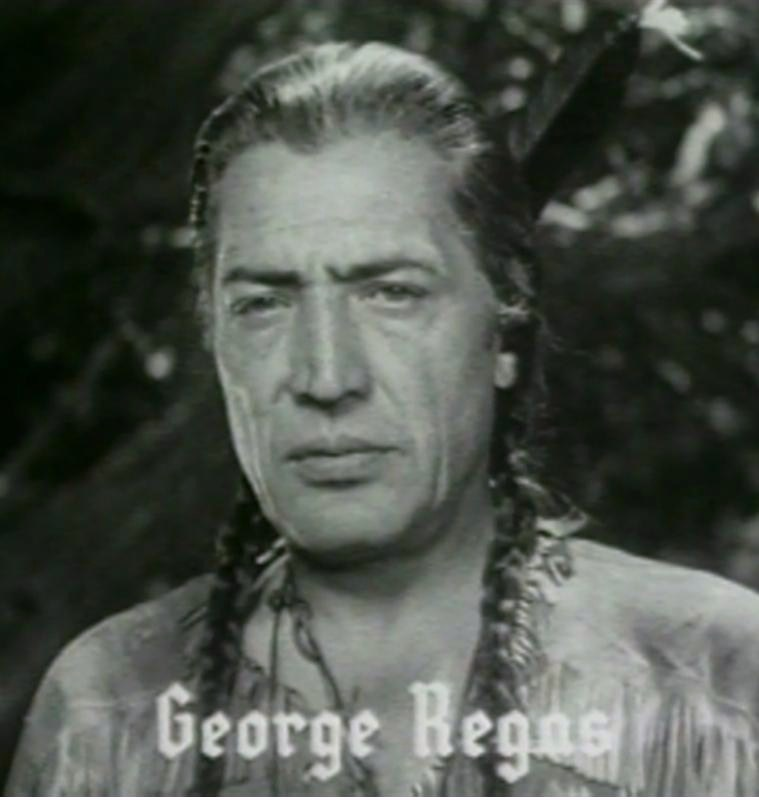
- Regas in Daniel Boone, 1936
- Born: Georgios Thomas Regakos; November 19, 1890; Goranoi, Peloponnese, Greece
- Died: December 13, 1940 (aged 50); Los Angeles, California, U.S.
- Years active: 1921–1940
- Spouse: Reine Davies (19??–1938; divorced)
- Relatives: Pedro Regas (brother)

George Thomas Regas (Greek: Γεώργιος Θωμάς Ρεγάκος; November 9, 1890 – December 13, 1940) was a Greek American actor.

== Biography ==
Regis was born near Sparta, Greece, the brother of actor Pedro Regas. He was a stage actor in Athens before coming to the United States. In New York City he played Romeo in a Grecian version of Romeo and Juliet.

In 1921, Regas acted in his first motion picture, The Love Light with Mary Pickford. This film was produced by Pickford's production company. He would go on to create character roles in over one hundred films. He was married to actress Reine Davies, the sister of Marion Davies. He starred as Mateo in The Adventures of Sherlock Holmes (1939).

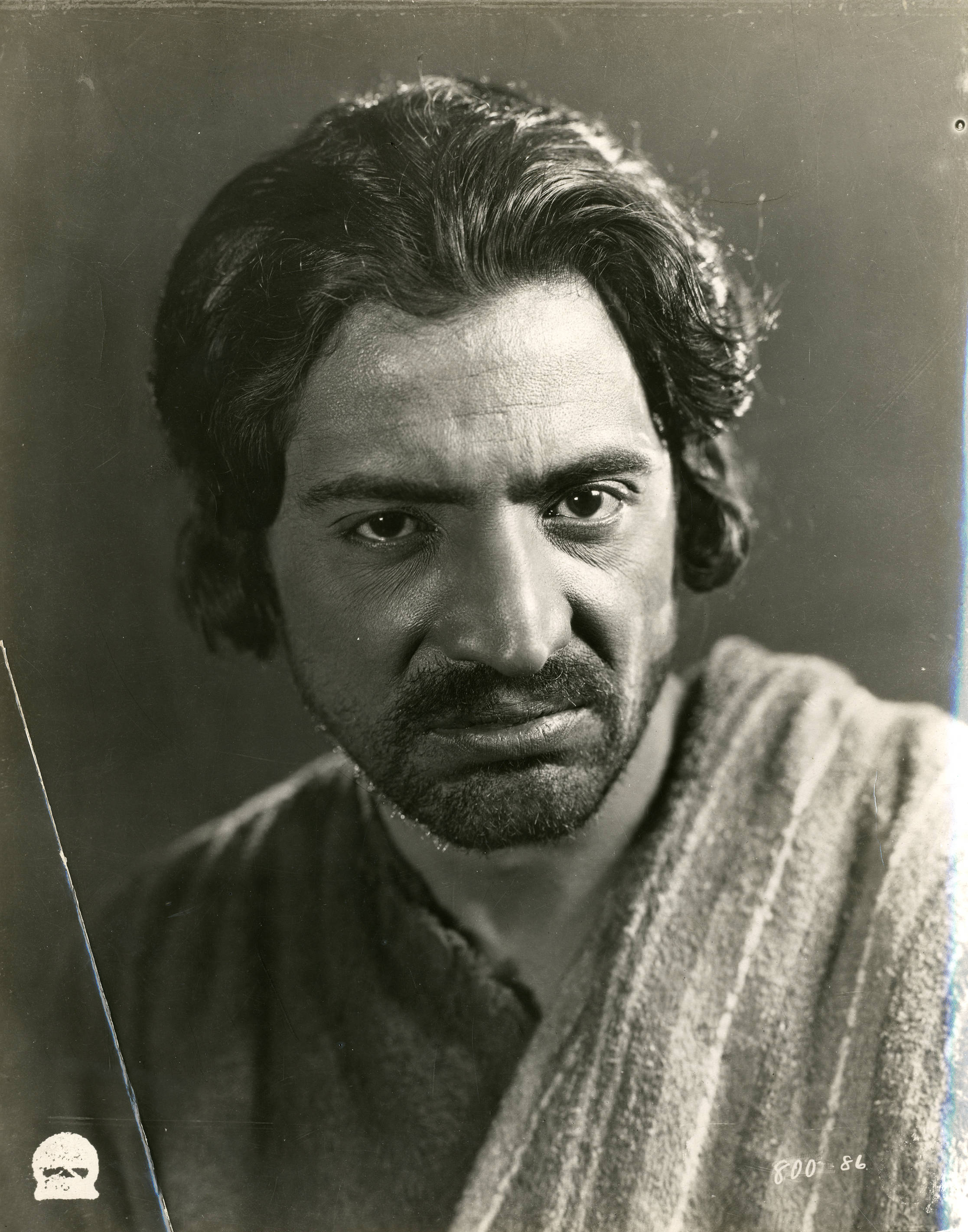
George Regas in a Publicity Photo from 1926

On Broadway, Regas portrayed Pedro in Zombie (1932).

== Death ==
Regas died In St. Vincent's Hospital after an operation for a throat infection on December 13, 1940, in Hollywood, California, at age fifty.

== Partial filmography ==
- The Love Light (1921) - Tony
- The Dangerous Moment (1921) - Movros Tarkides
- Omar the Tentmaker (1922) - Emissary to the Shah
- The Rip-Tide (1923) - The Philosopher
- Fashionable Fakers (1923) - A. Turk
- The Sea Hawk (1924) - Oarsman (uncredited)
- The Wanderer (1925) - Gaal
- That Royle Girl (1925) - Baretta's Henchman
- Desert Gold (1926) - Verd
- Beau Geste (1926) - Maris
- The Rescue (1929) - Wasub
- Redskin (1929) - Notani
- Wolf Song (1929) - Black Wolf
- The Wheel of Life (1929) - Bit Role (uncredited)
- Sea Fury (1929) - Captain
- Acquitted (1929) - Tony (billed as George Rigas)
- Alma de Gaucho (1930) - Don Casimiro
- The Lonesome Trail (1930) - The Ring Tailored Roarer
- Beau Ideal (1931) - The Emir
- Caught Cheating (1931) - Giuseppe
- Riders of the North (1931) - Leclerc
- Trapped (1931) - Jim Moore
- City Streets (1931) - Machine Gunner (uncredited)
- Newly Rich (1931) - Lippo (uncredited)
- Hell-Bent for Frisco (1931) - Tony
- Danger Island (1931, Serial) - Lascara
- Battling with Buffalo Bill (1931) - Henchman Breed Johns
- Mounted Fury (1931) - Pierre LeStrange
- The Golden West (1932) - Chief Black Wolf (uncredited)
- Destination Unknown (1933) - Tauru
- Central Airport (1933) - Havana Mechanic (uncredited)
- The Phantom of the Air (1933, Serial) - Ship Captain (uncredited)
- The Way to Love (1933) - Pedro
- Blood Money (1933) - Charley
- Sixteen Fathoms Deep (1934) - Theo Savanis
- Viva Villa! (1934) - Don Rodrigo
- Grand Canary (1934) - El Dazo (uncredited)
- Bulldog Drummond Strikes Back (1934) - Singh
- Fighting Trooper (1934) - Henri
- Kid Millions (1934) - Attendant (uncredited)
- The Marines Are Coming (1934) - The Torch (uncredited)
- Red Morning (1934) - Native (uncredited)
- Bordertown (1935) - Guillermo - Jailer in Mexico (uncredited)
- The Lives of a Bengal Lancer (1935) - Kushal Khan (uncredited)
- Under Pressure (1935) - Ruby, the Greek (uncredited)
- Eight Bells (1935) - Pedro (uncredited)
- The Red Blood of Courage (1935) - Frenchy - Henchman
- In Caliente (1935) - First Motor Cop (uncredited)
- Pursuit (1935) - Mexican Border Patrolman (uncredited)
- Here's to Romance (1935) - Greek Husband (uncredited)
- Night Cargo (1936) - Gus Noble
- Rose Marie (1936) - Boniface
- Hell-Ship Morgan (1936) - Covanci
- Robin Hood of El Dorado (1936) - Tomás
- The Girl from Mandalay (1936) - Headman
- Under Two Flags (1936) - Keskerdit (uncredited)
- Sworn Enemy (1936) - Greek - a Gangster (uncredited)
- Isle of Fury (1936) - Otar
- Rebellion (1936) - Gang Member (uncredited)
- Daniel Boone (1936) - Black Eagle
- The Charge of the Light Brigade (1936) - Wazir
- Waikiki Wedding (1937) - Muamua
- Left-Handed Law (1937) - Sam Logan
- Another Dawn (1937) - Sheik Achaben (scenes deleted)
- The Californian (1937) - Ruiz
- The Legion of Missing Men (1937) - Sgt. Garcia
- Love Under Fire (1937) - Lieutenant De Vega
- Charlie Chan on Broadway (1937) - Hindu (uncredited)
- Ali Baba Goes to Town (1937) - Bearded Arab (uncredited)
- Clipped Wings (1937) - Fernando - Moran's Henchman
- The Mysterious Pilot (1937, Serial) - RCAF Constable Remington (uncredited)
- Hawaiian Buckaroo (1938) - Regas
- Torchy Blane in Panama (1938) - Gomez
- Four Men and a Prayer (1938) - Egyptian Policeman (uncredited)
- The Toy Wife (1938) - Man Shot in Court (uncredited)
- Mr. Moto Takes a Chance (1938) - Bokor
- Arrest Bulldog Drummond (1938) - Soongh
- Scouts to the Rescue (1939) - Lokola -Indian Tribe High Priest
- Gunga Din (1939) - Thug Chieftain (uncredited)
- The Oklahoma Kid (1939) - Pedro (uncredited)
- Union Pacific (1939) - Indian Hearing Mollie's Telegraphy (uncredited)
- Code of the Secret Service (1939) - Mexican Police Officer
- Beau Geste (1939) - Arab Scout (uncredited)
- The Adventures of Sherlock Holmes (1939) - Matteo
- The Rains Came (1939) - Rajput (uncredited)
- The Cat and the Canary (1939) - Indian Guide
- The Mad Empress (1939) - Mariano Escobedo
- The Light That Failed (1939) - Cassavetti
- Virginia City (1940) - Murrell's Halfbreed Henchman (uncredited)
- 'Til We Meet Again (1940) - Mexican Bartender (uncredited)
- Torrid Zone (1940) - Sergeant of Police
- North West Mounted Police (1940) - Freddie (uncredited)
- The Mark of Zorro (1940) - Sergeant Gonzales (final film role)
