= Behind Stone Walls =

1932 film

- Directed by: Frank R. Strayer
- Written by: George B. Seitz
- Produced by: Ralph M. Like; Cliff P. Broughton
- Starring: Edward J. Nugent; Priscilla Dean; Ann Christy
- Cinematography: Jules Cronjager
- Edited by: Byron Robinson
- Production company: Action Pictures
- Distributed by: Mayfair Pictures
- Release date: March 15, 1932
- Running time: 58 minutes
- Country: United States
- Language: English

Behind Stone Walls is a 1932 American Pre-Code film directed by Frank R. Strayer and starring Edward J. Nugent, Priscilla Dean and Ann Christy.

== Plot ==
Esther Clay, the wife of district attorney John Manson Clay, is carrying on an affair with her husband's friend Jack Keene. When Keene announces he wants to end it, she grabs a gun and shoots him. Her stepson Bob comes upon the scene and helps her escape, but Bob is discovered with the gun and body by Keene's valet, Drugget, who has Bob arrested.

His father offers to resign as DA and defend him. Bob refuses to cooperate, so his father takes over the prosecution, sending him to jail.

Drugget, who knows the truth, starts blackmailing Esther.

Bob's girlfriend Peg Harper, believes in his innocence and works to get the evidence to clear Bob. She finds the truth and asks John to come to Esther's apartment to discover it. He confronts Esther and she threatens him with a gun. She leads him to another room and there's a shot. Esther staggers in, mortally wounded.

John is charged with murder. Bob has been released from prison and represents him, showing it was self-defense.

== Cast ==
- Edward J. Nugent as Bob Clay
- Priscilla Dean as Esther Clay, DA John Manson Clay's cheating wife
- Ann Christy as Peg Harper, Bob's girlfriend
- Robert Elliott as District Attorney John Manson Clay
- Robert Ellis as Jack Keene
- George Chesebro as Druggett, the blackmailing butler
- Allan Cavan as Prosecuting Attorney
- Harold Nelson as Judge
- Stanley Mack as Reporter at Trial
- Vance Carroll as Reporter at Trial
- Frank Meredith as Court Guard

== Bibliography ==
- Pitts, Michael R. Poverty Row Studios, 1929–1940: An Illustrated History of 55 Independent Film Companies, with a Filmography for Each. McFarland & Company, 2005.
