= Take It from Me (1926 film) =

1926 film directed by William A. Seiter

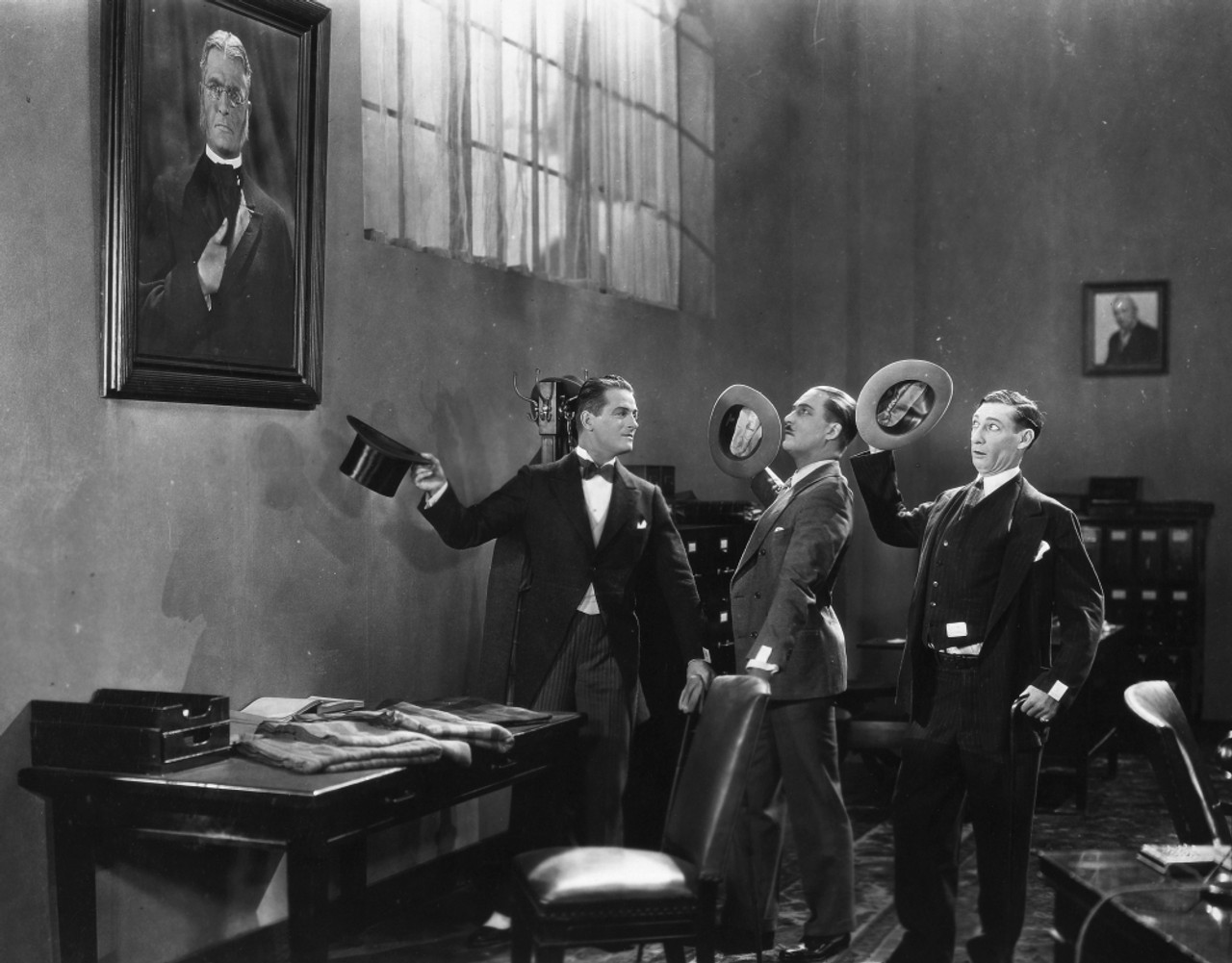
- Film still
- Directed by: William A. Seiter
- Written by: Harvey F. Thew
- Produced by: Carl Laemmle
- Starring: Reginald Denny; Blanche Mehaffey; Lee Moran
- Cinematography: Arthur L. Todd
- Edited by: John Rawlins
- Production company: Universal Pictures
- Distributed by: Universal Pictures
- Release date: October 10, 1926
- Running time: 70 minutes
- Country: United States
- Language: Silent (English intertitles)

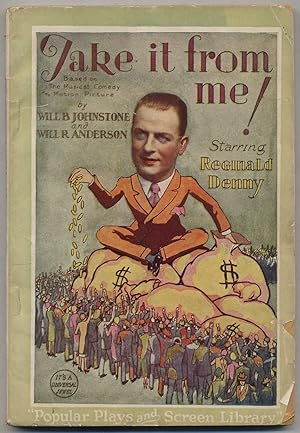
1926 novelization

Take It from Me is a 1926 American silent comedy film directed by William A. Seiter and starring Reginald Denny, Blanche Mehaffey, and Lee Moran.

== Cast ==
- Reginald Denny as Tom Eggett
- Blanche Mehaffey as Grace Gordon
- Ben Hendricks Jr. as Dick
- Lee Moran as Van
- Lucien Littlefield as Cyrus Crabb
- Ethel Wales as Miss Abbott
- Bertram Johns as Percy
- Jean Tolley a Gwen Forsythe
- Tom O'Brien as Taxi Driver
- Vera Lewis as Mrs. Forsythe

== Preservation ==
A print of Take It from Me is held by the EYE Film Institute Netherlands.

== Bibliography ==
- Munden, Kenneth White. The American Film Institute Catalog of Motion Pictures Produced in the United States, Part 1. University of California Press, 1997.
