= The Denver Dude =

1927 film

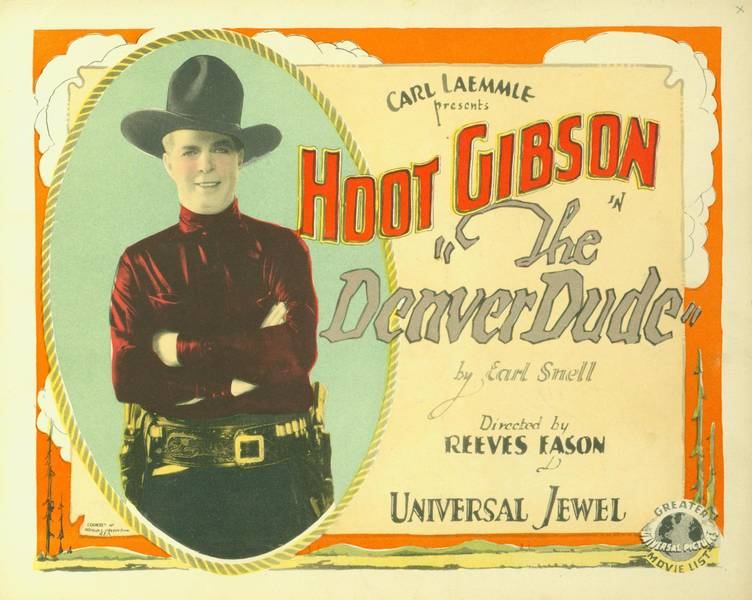
- Lobby card
- Directed by: B. Reeves Eason
- Written by: William Berke; Carl Krusada; Earle Snell
- Produced by: Carl Laemmle
- Starring: Hoot Gibson; Blanche Mehaffey; Robert McKim
- Cinematography: Harry Neumann
- Production company: Universal Pictures
- Distributed by: Universal Pictures
- Release date: February 13, 1927
- Running time: 60 minutes
- Country: United States
- Language: Silent (English intertitles)

The Denver Dude is a 1927 American silent Western film directed by B. Reeves Eason and starring Hoot Gibson, Blanche Mehaffey, and Robert McKim. It was produced and distributed by Universal Pictures.

== Plot ==
As described in a film magazine, Rodeo Randall, three-time winner of the broncho busting championship of the world, starts for home after several year's absence. His father, who has long been the "friendly enemy" of Col. Frederick La Marr, sells the latter a prize bull, but demands payment in cash, and La Marr is forced to send to his bank in Denver for the money. The bearer of the money pouch, Henry Bird, is a foppish man. He occupies the homebound stage with Rodeo, who falls in love with a newspaper picture of La Marr's beautiful daughter Patricia. The fop, however, shatters the cowpuncher's hope when he assures him that a cultivated young lady like Pat will demand class, meaning himself. He proudly exhibits a letter of recommendation to the post of manager of the general store owned by La Marr. The stage is held up, and Bird flees in terror while the cowboy puts the bandits to rout and recovers the loot. Dolling himself up in Bird's spare clothes and appropriating Bird's letter, he carries the money to La Marr and gets the job. He sees his loved one every day and she likes him, all except the funny clothes. The store manager has the full confidence of La Marr, because of his heroism and honesty, so he is trusted with the safe combination. The double-crossing ranch foreman, who has been at the bottom of the robbery, gets hold of the combination and takes the money from the safe. Rodeo is accused and arrested, but escapes in Scotch kilts when his guard falls into inebriated slumber. He overhears the ranch foreman ordering the stage bandits to take the money to their hideout and wait. Rodeo pursues them on a wild horse and brings them back hog-tied with the loot, which he returns to La Marr, while he holds a gun to the foreman and places him under arrest. The friendly feud between the two families comes to an end and Rodeo and Patricia are united.

== Cast ==
- Hoot Gibson as Rodeo Randall
- Blanche Mehaffey as Patricia La Mar
- Robert McKim as Bob Flint
- Slim Summerville as Slim Jones
- Glenn Tryon as Percy the dude
- Howard Truesdale as Col. La Mar
- Mathilde Brundage as Mrs. Phipps
- Rolfe Sedan as Henry Bird
- Grace Cunard as Mrs. Bird
- Buck Carey as Red Quincy
- Gilbert Holmes as Shorty Dan

== Preservation ==
With no prints of The Denver Dude located in any film archives, it is a lost film.

== Bibliography ==
- Connelly, Robert B. The Silents: Silent Feature Films, 1910-36, Volume 40, Issue 2. December Press, 1998.
- Munden, Kenneth White. The American Film Institute Catalog of Motion Pictures Produced in the United States, Part 1. University of California Press, 1997.
