= Anybody's Blonde =

1931 film directed by Frank R. Strayer

- Theatrical poster
- Directed by: Frank R. Strayer
- Written by: Betty Burbridge
- Produced by: Ralph M. Like
- Starring: Dorothy Revier; Reed Howes; Edna Murphy
- Cinematography: Jules Cronjager
- Edited by: Byron Robinson
- Production company: Action Pictures
- Distributed by: Mayfair Pictures
- Release date: November 17, 1931 (US)
- Running time: 59 minutes
- Country: United States
- Language: English

Anybody's Blonde is a 1931 American Pre-Code mystery film directed by Frank R. Strayer from an original screenplay by Betty Burbridge. The film stars Dorothy Revier, Reed Howes, and Edna Murphy, and was released by Action Pictures on November 17, 1931.

== Plot ==
Janet Reese is a reporter whose brother, Jim Dorgan, is an up-and-coming boxer, who is a win away from getting a shot at a title bout. Steve Crane is a local gangster who also owns a popular nightclub. Crane, knowing he can get better odds betting against Dorgan, tries to force him into throwing the match, but Dorgan refuses. Crane enlists Myrtle Devoe, one of his showgirls and his mistress to distract Dorgan long enough so that he misses the fight. Myrtle and Dorgan used to go out, so when she invites him back to her place, he agrees. When Dorgan doesn't show up for his match against Don O'Hara, he loses by forfeit. O'Hara now becomes the number one challenger for the title.

The following morning, Dorgan is found dead near Myrtle's apartment. The police pick up both Myrtle and Crane for questioning, but there is not enough evidence to make a case against them. During their interrogation Crane tries to shift interest onto O'Hara. When they are released, Crane thinks it would be best for Myrtle to leave town for a while, at least until the heat about Dorgan's murder dies down.

Frustrated with the lack of progress being made by the police. Janet decides to investigate for herself. With the departure of Myrtle, there is an opening at Crane's club, and Janet applies for and gets the job. Crane becomes interested in Janet, and she begins to lead him along. As they are talking, O'Hara storms in, angry at Crane's having attempted to finger him for Dorgan's murder. There is an instant attraction between Janet and O'Hara. As Janet and O'Hara's romance blossoms, she continues to attempt to pump Crane for information about her brother's murder. O'Hara proposes to Janet, but she turns him down, since he is a boxer, and she hates boxing.

Meanwhile, Myrtle has heard about Crane's interest in Janet, and returns to town, intent on staking her claim. Seeing a way to make Myrtle's return work in her favor, Janet plans to force a confrontation between Crane and Myrtle, with the police listening in. As the night of the title fight approaches, Janet sets the trap up at Crane's apartment for the night before the fight. When O'Hara learns that Janet is over Crane's apartment, he heads over there to confirm it. When he does, he jumps to the conclusion that there is something going on between the two. He heads to the nearest bar to drown his sorrows. Janet goes through with her plan, and has Myrtle show up at Crane's. During the argument between the two, Myrtle and Crane reveal enough of their murder of Dorgan to allow the police to arrest them.

When the fight takes place the following night, O'Hara is still drunk and subsequently loses the fight. When Janet finds him and tries to explain what was really going on, he doesn't want to hear about it, but when he sees her report in the paper, he understands she was telling the truth, and the two reconcile.

== Cast ==
- Dorothy Revier as Janet Reese
- Reed Howes as Don O'Hara
- Edna Murphy as Myrtle Devoe
- Lloyd Whitlock as Steve Crane
- Arthur Housman as Mulligan
- Henry B. Walthall as Mr. Evans
- Pat O'Malley as Reporter
- Gene Morgan as Stage director
- Nita Martan as Ginger

== Reception ==
The Film Daily gave the film a good review saying it was a "...fast action picture carries pop appeal with good love interest." While they thought the plot was a bit "hokey", they felt the movie had good action sequences, "done with showmanship and furnishes a lot of suspense and some real thrills." They also enjoyed the acting, while rating the directing and camera-work acceptable.
