= Alias Mary Smith =

1932 film

- Directed by: E. Mason Hopper
- Written by: Edward T. Lowe Jr.
- Produced by: Ralph M. Like
- Starring: Blanche Mehaffey; John Darrow; Raymond Hatton
- Cinematography: Jules Cronjager
- Edited by: Byron Robinson
- Production company: Ralph M. Like Productions
- Distributed by: Mayfair Pictures; British Lion (UK)
- Release date: July 15, 1932
- Running time: 61 minutes
- Country: United States
- Language: English

Alias Mary Smith is a 1932 American pre-Code mystery crime film directed by E. Mason Hopper and starring Blanche Mehaffey, John Darrow, and Raymond Hatton. It was released by the independent company Mayfair Pictures.

== Plot ==
A young woman known by her alias Mary Smith, falls in love with a wealthy young man despite his father's disapproval. Unbeknown to them she is the sister of a man executed after being framed by gangster Snowy Hoagland for a crime he didn't commit. Seeking revenge on him, she becomes entangled in the murder of a district attorney.

== Cast ==
- Blanche Mehaffey as Joan
- John Darrow as Buddy
- Raymond Hatton as Scoop
- Edmund Breese as Father
- Myrtle Stedman as Mother
- Gwen Lee as Blossom
- Henry B. Walthall as Attwell
- Alec B. Francis as Lawyer
- Matthew Betz as Snowy
- Jack Grey as Kearney
- Harry Strang as Yeager
- Ben Hall as Jake
- Jack Cheatham as Cop
- George Chesebro as Mac

== Production ==
The film was completed in just 6 days, finishing in May 1932.

== Bibliography ==
- Langman, Larry & Finn, Daniel. A Guide to American Crime Films of the Thirties. Greenwood Press, 1995.
- Pitts, Michael R. Poverty Row Studios, 1929–1940. McFarland & Company, 2005.
