= Dance Hall Hostess =

1933 film

- Directed by: B. Reeves Eason
- Written by: Carl Krusada; Betty Burbridge
- Produced by: Wesley Ford; George W. Weeks
- Starring: Helen Chandler; Jason Robards Sr.; Alberta Vaughn
- Cinematography: Jules Cronjager
- Edited by: Byron Robinson
- Production company: Golden Arrow Productions
- Distributed by: Mayfair Pictures
- Release date: July 1, 1933
- Running time: 73 minutes
- Country: United States
- Language: English

Dance Hall Hostess is a 1933 American drama film directed by B. Reeves Eason and starring Helen Chandler, Jason Robards Sr. and Alberta Vaughn.

== Cast ==
- Helen Chandler as Nora Marsh
- Jason Robards Sr. as Jerry Raymond
- Edward J. Nugent as Patrick Gibbs Jr.
- Natalie Moorhead as Clare
- Alberta Vaughn as Myra
- Jane Keckley as Mrs. Gibbs
- Ronnie Cosby as Donnie
- Clarence Geldart as Sheriff

== Bibliography ==
- Alan G. Fetrow. Sound films, 1927-1939: a United States filmography. McFarland, 1992.
