= Riders of the North =

1931 film directed by J.P. McGowan

- Directed by: J.P. McGowan
- Written by: George Arthur Durlam
- Produced by: George Arthur Durlam
- Starring: Bob Custer; Blanche Mehaffey; Eddie Dunn
- Cinematography: Otto Himm
- Edited by: Charles J. Hunt
- Production company: G.A. Durlam Productions
- Distributed by: Syndicate Pictures
- Release date: April 5, 1931
- Running time: 59 minutes
- Country: United States
- Language: English

Riders of the North is a 1931 American pre-Code Western film directed by J.P. McGowan and starring Bob Custer, Blanche Mehaffey and Eddie Dunn.

== Plot ==
A Mountie's search for his partner's killer initially leads him to suspect the wrong man. Eventually an unexpected source helps to uncover the true killers.

== Cast ==
- Bob Custer as Mountie Sergeant Stone
- Blanche Mehaffey as Ann
- Eddie Dunn as Tim 'Mac' McGuire
- Will Walling as Inspector Devlin
- Frank Rice as The Parson
- George Regas as Leclerc
- Robert 'Buddy' Shaw as Tom - Ann's Brother
- George Hackathorne as Henchman Canuck Joe
- Carl Deloro as Henchman Charley
- Al Ferguson as Constable Jones

== Bibliography ==
- Michael R. Pitts. Poverty Row Studios, 1929–1940: An Illustrated History of 55 Independent Film Companies, with a Filmography for Each. McFarland & Company, 2005.
