= Behind Jury Doors =

1932 film

- Directed by: B. Reeves Eason
- Written by: Frank Fenton; John T. Neville
- Produced by: Fanchon Royer; Ralph M. Like; George W. Weeks
- Starring: Helen Chandler; William Collier Jr.; Blanche Friderici
- Cinematography: Ernest Miller
- Edited by: Jeanne Spencer
- Music by: Lee Zahler
- Production company: Fanchon Royer Pictures
- Distributed by: Mayfair Pictures
- Release date: December 1, 1932
- Running time: 63 minutes
- Country: United States
- Language: English

Behind Jury Doors is a 1932 American pre-Code mystery film directed by B. Reeves Eason and starring Helen Chandler, William Collier Jr. and Blanche Friderici.

== Cast ==
- Helen Chandler as Elsa Lanfield
- William Collier Jr. as Steve Mannon
- Blanche Friderici as Mrs. Lanfield
- Franklin Parker as Casey
- John Davidson as George Fisher
- Walter Miller as Arthur Corbett
- Richard Cramer as Gus Mauger
- Jessie Arnold as Ma Mauger
- Louis Natheaux as Halliday
- Patsy Cunningham as Mame
- James Gordon as William Wegand
- Arthur Loft as James Collins
- Gordon De Main as Dr. Emil Lanfield

== Bibliography ==
- Michael R. Pitts. Poverty Row Studios, 1929–1940: An Illustrated History of 55 Independent Film Companies, with a Filmography for Each. McFarland & Company, 2005.
