= Ralph M. Like =

American film producer

- Born: September 2, 1894; Iowa, US
- Died: December 27, 1955 (aged 61); Newport Beach, California, US
- Occupation: Film producer
- Years active: 1927-1943 (film)

Ralph Martin Like (1894–1955) was an American film producer. He was involved with several independent film companies producing low-budget releases on Poverty Row.

In 1932 he established Mayfair Pictures. Other companies he was involved with were Action Pictures and Progressive Pictures. After his studios folded in 1934, he produced only one further film You Can't Beat the Law for Monogram in 1943. Like also worked as a sound engineer at some of the major studios.

From 1932 to 1938 he was married to the actress Blanche Mehaffey, who starred in several of his films. He died in his Newport Beach home on December 27, 1955.

== Selected filmography ==
- The Desert of the Lost (1927)
- Between Dangers (1927)
- The White Outlaw (1929)
- Fighters of the Saddle (1929)
- Overland Bound (1929)
- The Sky Spider (1931)
- Hell-Bent for Frisco (1931)
- Chinatown After Dark (1931)
- Soul of the Slums (1931)
- Dragnet Patrol (1931)
- Night Beat (1931)
- Anybody's Blonde (1931)
- First Aid (1931)
- The Monster Walks (1932)
- Malay Nights (1932)
- Docks of San Francisco (1932)
- Sally of the Subway (1932)
- Alias Mary Smith (1932)
- The Widow in Scarlet (1932)
- Behind Stone Walls (1932)
- Love in High Gear (1932)
- Midnight Morals (1932)
- Behind Jury Doors (1932)
- Sister to Judas (1932)
- The Heart Punch (1932)
- Sin's Pay Day (1932)
- Tangled Destinies (1932)
- Easy Millions (1933)
- Mystery at Monte Carlo (1933)
- Passport to Paradise (1933)
- Riot Squad (1933)
- Her Resale Value (1933)
- What's Your Racket? (1934)
- The Ghost Rider (1935)
- The Cowboy and the Bandit (1935)
- You Can't Beat the Law (1943)

== Bibliography ==
- Michael R. Pitts. Poverty Row Studios, 1929–1940: An Illustrated History of 55 Independent Film Companies, with a Filmography for Each. McFarland & Company, 2005.
