= No Living Witness =

1932 film

- Theatrical release poster
- Directed by: E. Mason Hopper
- Screenplay by: Norman Houston
- Produced by: Cliff Broughton; George W. Weeks
- Starring: Gilbert Roland; Noah Beery Sr. Barbara Kent; Carmel Myers; Otis Harlan; Dorothy Revier; J. Carrol Naish; Ferike Boros; John Ince
- Cinematography: Jules Cronjager
- Edited by: Byron Robinson
- Production company: Mayfair Pictures
- Distributed by: Mayfair Pictures
- Release date: September 15, 1932
- Running time: 67 minutes
- Country: United States
- Language: English

No Living Witness is a 1932 American pre-Code crime film directed by E. Mason Hopper and written by Norman Houston. The film stars Gilbert Roland, Noah Beery Sr., Barbara Kent, Carmel Myers, Otis Harlan, Dorothy Revier, J. Carrol Naish, Ferike Boros and John Ince. The film was released on September 15, 1932, by Mayfair Pictures.

== Cast ==
- Gilbert Roland as Jerry Bennett
- Noah Beery Sr. as Clyde Corbin
- Barbara Kent as Carol Everett
- Carmel Myers as Emillia
- Otis Harlan as Pop Everett
- Dorothy Revier as Miss Thompson
- J. Carrol Naish as Nick
- Ferike Boros as Nick's Mother
- John Ince as Police Captain
- Monte Carter as Looey
- Broderick O'Farrell as District Attorney
- Arthur Millett as Harry Newton
- James Cooley as Fatty Raskin
- Gordon De Main as Eddie Schrabe
