= Is There Justice? =

1931 film

- Directed by: Stuart Paton
- Written by: Betty Burbridge
- Produced by: Cliff P. Broughton; George W. Weeks
- Starring: Rex Lease; Henry B. Walthall; Blanche Mehaffey
- Production company: George W. Weeks Productions
- Distributed by: Sono Art-World Wide Pictures
- Release date: October 4, 1931
- Running time: 65 minutes
- Country: United States
- Language: English

Is There Justice? is a 1931 American pre-Code crime film directed by Stuart Paton and starring Rex Lease, Henry B. Walthall and Blanche Mehaffey. It is now considered a lost film.

== Plot ==
The brother of woman who died in jail seeks revenge on the district attorney by getting hold of a photograph of his daughter dancing on a table on her underwear.

== Cast ==
- Rex Lease as Jerry Heath
- Henry B. Walthall as District Attorney John Raymond
- Blanche Mehaffey as Kay Raymond
- Robert Ellis as Dan Lawrence
- Helen Foster as June Lawrence
- Ernie Adams as Shorty Gray
- Joseph W. Girard as Chief of Police
- Richard Cramer as Detective Regan
- John Ince as Dr. Gibbs
- Walter Brennan as Rollins

== Bibliography ==
- Larry Langman & Daniel Finn. A Guide to American Crime Films of the Thirties. Greenwood Press, 1995.
