= Held for Ransom (1938 film) =

- Directed by: Clarence Bricker
- Written by: Barry Barringer
- Starring: Blanche Mehaffey; Grant Withers; Jack Mulhall
- Cinematography: Roland Price; Arthur Reed
- Edited by: George Halligan
- Distributed by: Grand National Pictures
- Release date: June 17, 1938
- Running time: 59 minutes
- Country: United States
- Language: English

Held for Ransom is a 1938 American action film directed by Clarence Bricker and starring Blanche Mehaffey, Grant Withers and Jack Mulhall. It was written by Barry Barringer.

== Plot ==
Millionaire Herbert Scott is kidnapped. His nephew Larry Scott pays the ransom but his uncle is not released. Kimble, the Scott's caretaker of their lodge, intercepts the ransom payoff and stuffs the cash into empty shotgun shells. When Kimble is killed trying to contact Larry, Larry decides to investigate with his friend Don and heads up to the lodge. Betty, an FBI agent, poses as a writer and checks into the inn near the Scott's lodge. The crooks, in league with Scott's neighbour, Sam Hathaway, are suspicious of Betty and have her watched. She escapes out her window and heads over to Sam's place to search. The crooks come in and she hides and overhears their conversation and learns that Sam has figured out where the money is. She follows them to the store where Kimble had left the box of shells but unknown to them, the box got sent with groceries to Larry's place.

Betty gets the drop on two of the crooks and leaves them tied up for the local constable. She heads back to Larry's but Sam sees them with the money and shoots through the window. Don and Betty give chase leaving Larry with the money. Betty comes back and finds Larry on the floor and a secret door slowly closing. Larry chops through the door with an axe while in the cave below Sam has a falling out with the third crook over his share of the money. Sam is killed and the crook runs away as Larry and Betty rush into the cave. Larry gives chase while Betty unties his uncle who has been tied to a post. Don comes back and Betty sends him off with the uncle. Larry knocks out the crook and gets the money but the two crooks have escaped the constable and tie Larry up and set fire to the mill. They take the money and Betty and take off in the car but are chased by Betty's partner, Morrison, who arrived in response to her telegram. The police run the crooks off the road and rescue Betty and the cash. They race to save Larry and Betty and Larry head to Hawaii for their honeymoon.

== Cast ==
- Blanche Mehaffey as Betty Mason
- Grant Withers as Larry Scott
- Bruce Warren as Don
- Jack Mulhall as J. J. Morrison
- Kenneth Harlan as Boss McBride
- Harry Harvey, Sr. as Mole
- Edward Foster as Joe
- Walter McGrail as Detective Donnelly
- George Moore as Sam Hathaway
- Robert McKenzie as storekeeper

== Reception ==
Variety wrote: "Cloudy print and bum recording make Held for Ransom a severe test on eye and ear, best thing about it being the title. It will gravitate to the lower side of duals in the action houses, satisfy the kids, but generally bore the grownups. ... Finish has action and plenty of it. General summation, however, finds it very poor."

Kine Weekly wrote: "There is plenty of action but not a great deal of plausibility, and even less regard for continuity. It has to be taken at its face value. Still, surface incident, backed up by strenuous team-work, just about places it in the supporting feature class."

The Monthly Film Bulletin wrote: "There are absurdly hairbreadth escapes from a burning building in the old-style melodramatic way, and the last shots of a tourist Honolulu are pretty weak. The acting is adequate."
