= Night Beat (1931 film) =

1931 film

- Film poster
- Directed by: George B. Seitz
- Written by: Scott Darling
- Produced by: Ralph M. Like
- Starring: Jack Mulhall; Patsy Ruth Miller
- Cinematography: Edward Cronjager
- Edited by: Byron Robinson
- Production company: Action Pictures
- Distributed by: Mayfair Pictures
- Release date: December 27, 1931
- Running time: 61 minutes
- Country: United States
- Language: English

Night Beat is a 1931 American pre-Code crime film directed by George B. Seitz.

== Cast ==
- Jack Mulhall as Johnny
- Patsy Ruth Miller as Eleanor
- Walter McGrail as Martin
- Harry Cording as Chill Scarpelli
- Ernie Adams as Weissenkorn
- Richard Cramer as Featherstone
- Harry Semels as Italian

== Bibliography ==
- Pitts, Michael R. Poverty Row Studios, 1929–1940: An Illustrated History of 55 Independent Film Companies, with a Filmography for Each. McFarland & Company, 2005.
