= Edward Nugent =

American actor

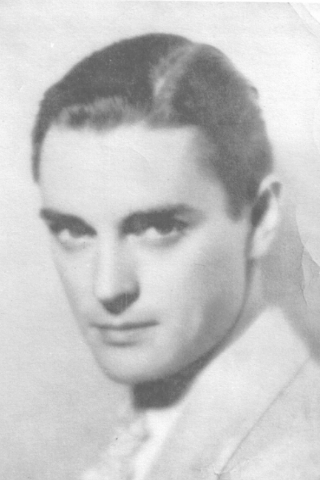
- Edward Nugent
- Born: Edward James Nugent; February 7, 1904; New York City, U.S.
- Died: January 3, 1995 (aged 90); San Antonio, Texas, U.S.
- Occupation: Actor
- Years active: 1928–1937

Edward James Nugent (February 7, 1904 – January 3, 1995) was an American film and stage actor.

== Biography ==
Nugent was born on February 7, 1904, and acted in films between 1928 and 1937.

When Nugent was a boy, he sang with the Metropolitan Opera in New York. He performed in vaudeville before he began acting in Hollywood. He also acted on radio.

He has no known relation to actor/writer Elliott Nugent or his father J. C. Nugent though he may have acted with them.

== Selected filmography ==
- The Man in Hobbles (1928) - Jake Harris
- Our Dancing Daughters (1928) - Freddie
- A Single Man (1929) - Dickie
- The Flying Fleet (1929) - Midshipman Dizzy (uncredited)
- The Bellamy Trial (1929) - Reporter
- The Duke Steps Out (1929) - Tommy Wells
- The Girl in the Show (1929) - Dave Amazon
- Our Modern Maidens (1929) - Reg
- Untamed (1929) - Paul
- The Vagabond Lover (1929) - Sport
- Loose Ankles (1930) - Andy Martin
- Clancy in Wall Street (1930) - Donald MacIntosh
- Bright Lights (1930) - 'Windy' Jones
- War Nurse (1930) - Frank
- Remote Control (1930) - Radio Engineer
- Three Hollywood Girls (1931, Short)
- Girls Demand Excitement (1931) - Tommy
- Strangers May Kiss (1931) - 2nd Admirer (uncredited)
- Crashing Hollywood (1931, Short)
- Shipmates (1931) - What-Ho
- Young Sinners (1931) - Bud
- Up Pops the Devil (1931) - George Kent
- Night Nurse (1931) - Eagan
- The Star Witness (1931) - Jackie Leeds
- Bought! (1931) - Minor Role (uncredited)
- Local Boy Makes Good (1931) - Wally Pierce
- A Fool's Advice (1932) - Steve
- Behind Stone Walls (1932) - Bob Clay
- The Honor of the Press (1932) - Daniel E. Greely
- Crooner (1932) - Henry - Band Member
- Men Are Such Fools (1932) - Eddie Martin
- The Past of Mary Holmes (1933) - Flanagan
- 42nd Street (1933) - Terry
- The Girl in 419 (1933) - Interne (uncredited)
- Dance Hall Hostess (1933) - Patrick Gibbs Jr.
- College Humor (1933) - Whistler
- This Day and Age (1933) - Don Merrick
- Dance Girl Dance (1933) - Joe Pitt
- Beauty for Sale (1933) - Bill Merrick
- This Side of Heaven (1934) - Vance
- She Loves Me Not (1934) - Buzz Jones
- No Ransom (1934) - Eddie Winfield
- A Girl of the Limberlost (1934) - Phillip Ammon
- Lost in the Stratosphere (1934) - Lt. Richard 'Woody' Wood
- Girl o' My Dreams (1934) - Larry Haines
- Men in White (1934) - (scenes deleted)
- Lottery Lover (1935) - Gibbs
- Baby Face Harrington (1935) - Albert
- Kentucky Blue Streak (1935) - Martin Marion
- College Scandal (1935) - Jake Lansing
- Skybound (1935) - Doug Kent
- The Old Homestead (1935) - Rudy Nash
- Fighting Youth (1935) - Anthony Tonnetti
- Forced Landing (1935) - Jim Redfern
- Ah, Wilderness! (1935) - Wint Selby
- Just My Luck (1935) - Vic Dunne
- Dancing Feet (1936) - Jimmy Cassidy
- Doughnuts and Society (1936) - Jerry Flannagan
- The Harvester (1936) - Bert Munroe
- Rio Grande Romance (1936) - Bob Andrews
- Bunker Bean (1936) - Mr. Glab
- Prison Shadows (1936) - Gene Harris
- The Big Game (1936) - Drunk (uncredited)
- Pigskin Parade (1936) - Sparks
- Two Minutes to Play (1936) - Jack Gaines
- A Man Betrayed (1936) - Frank Powell
- Put on the Spot (1936) - Bob Andrews (archive footage)
- Man of the People (1937) - Edward Spetner
- Speed to Spare (1937) - Larry 'Skids' Brannigan
- Island Captives (1937) - Tom Willoughby
