= Viola Roehl =

American film editor

- Born: Viola M. Roehl; 1905; Butte, Montana, USA
- Occupation: Film editor
- Spouse: James Jefferys
- Children: 1

Viola Roehl was an American film editor who cut B movies in the early 1930s.

== Biography ==
Viola was born to Max Roehl and Myrtle Bonner in Butte, Montana. The family moved west in the early 1920s. According to census records, she was already working as a film cutter by 1930, however she didn't receive her first credit until 1931's Sheer Luck. She married James Jefferys in 1933, and the pair had a son. Her date of death is unknown.

== Selected filmography ==
- Neck and Neck (1931)
- Chinatown After Dark (1931)
- The Sky Spider (1931)
- Sheer Luck (1931)
