= Match Play =

1930 film

- Directed by: Mack Sennett
- Written by: Harry McCoy, Roscoe Arbuckle
- Produced by: Mack Sennett
- Release date: March 16, 1930
- Running time: 20 minutes
- Country: United States

Match Play is a 1930 film directed by Mack Sennett.

== Cast ==
- Walter Hagen
- Leo Diegel
- Andy Clyde
- Marjorie Beebe
- Bud Jamison
- William Searby
- Kathryn Stanley
