= You Can't Beat the Law =

1943 film by Phil Rosen

- A poster bearing the film's American TV title: Prison Mutiny
- Directed by: Phil Rosen
- Written by: Albert Beich (screenplay); Charles R. Marion (additional dialogue)
- Produced by: Ralph M. Like (associate producer); Lindsley Parsons (producer)
- Starring: See below
- Cinematography: Mack Stengler
- Edited by: Carl Pierson
- Production company: Monogram Pictures
- Distributed by: Monogram Pictures
- Release date: January 29, 1943
- Running time: 61 minutes
- Country: United States
- Language: English

You Can't Beat the Law is a 1943 American drama film directed by Phil Rosen; also known as Prison Mutiny (American TV title).

== Plot ==
Johnny Gray (Edward Norris) is a self-proclaimed playboy. Gray's car is found at the scene of a crime; and although it's been stolen, it is enough to convict Gray of the holdup. Rico (Willy Castello) is the real criminal, but never becomes a suspect. Rico's gang members Creeper, Harry, and Red are also sent to jail with Gray. When Gray's fiancée even believes Johnny is guilty, he becomes angry and a difficult prisoner. Gray is eventually put in the same cell as Cain (Jack La Rue); who is the head of a gang that's planning a prison break. Frank Sanders (Milburn Stone) is a new warden at the prison, and he eventually earns Gray's trust. Gray is transferred to different cell with a new cell-mate, and given the chance to work in the prison gardens. While working in the gardens, Gray meets Amy Duncan (Joan Woodbury), who is the daughter of one of the prison guards. Rico plans a prison break from the outside, but is killed in the attempt. Eventually one of Rico's men admits that Johnny Gray is an innocent man.

== Cast ==
- Edward Norris as Johnny Gray
- Joan Woodbury as Amy Duncan
- Jack La Rue as Convict Cain, Prison-break Leader
- Milburn Stone as Frank Sanders (new warden)
- Charles Jordan as Rico Henchman Creeper
- Kenneth Harlan as 1st Warden
- Robert Homans as Prison Guard Duncan, Amy's Father
- George Kamel as Rico Henchman Jumpy
- Bryant Washburn as Attorney
- Willy Castello as Rico, gang boss
- Inna Gest as Patricia Bedford
- Selmer Jackson as Gattrnor
- Paul McVey as Wayne, death row inmate
- Tristram Coffin as Gang Lawyer
