= Her Mad Night =

1932 film

- Directed by: E. Mason Hopper
- Written by: John T. Neville
- Produced by: Cliff P. Broughton
- Starring: Conway Tearle; Irene Rich; Mary Carlisle
- Cinematography: Jules Cronjager
- Edited by: Byron Robinson
- Production company: Cliff Broughton Productions
- Distributed by: Mayfair Pictures
- Release date: October 12, 1932
- Running time: 67 minutes
- Country: United States
- Language: English

Her Mad Night is a 1932 American pre-Code crime film directed by E. Mason Hopper and starring Conway Tearle, Irene Rich and Mary Carlisle. It is also known by the title Held For Murder.

== Plot ==
On an ocean crossing, lawyer Steven Kennedy repeatedly proposes marriage to Joan Manners, eventually she accepts. She hits it off well with Steve's daughter Connie, but find that she is in a relationship with Schuyler Durkin, who Joan had once also been in a relationship with.

== Cast ==
- Conway Tearle as Steven Kennedy
- Irene Rich as Joan Manners
- Mary Carlisle as Constance 'Connie' Kennedy
- Kenneth Thomson as Schuyler Durkin
- William B. Davidson as District Attorney
- William Irving as Jury Foreman

== Bibliography ==
- Pitts, Michael R. Poverty Row Studios, 1929-1940. McFarland & Company, 2005.
