= Easy Millions =

1933 American comedy film

- Directed by: Fred C. Newmeyer
- Written by: Edgar Franklin; Jack Jevne
- Produced by: Ralph M. Like; John R. Freuler
- Starring: Richard "Skeets" Gallagher; Dorothy Burgess; Merna Kennedy
- Cinematography: Jules Cronjager
- Edited by: Byron Robinson
- Production company: Monarch Film Corporation
- Distributed by: Freuler Film Associates
- Release date: June 30, 1933
- Running time: 56 minutes
- Country: United States
- Language: English

Easy Millions is a 1933 American comedy film directed by Fred C. Newmeyer and starring Richard "Skeets" Gallagher, Dorothy Burgess and Merna Kennedy. It was produced by Monarch Productions and distributed by Freuler Film Associates. The film was based on Edgar Franklin's short story "Good Looking and Rich", which was also used as the film's working title.

== Plot ==
A man tries to avoid an unwanted business proposal by falsely claiming that he has recently inherited one million dollars. The story quickly spreads, and the size of the supposed inheritance is exaggerated to three million dollars. When his aunt hears the rumor, her doctor warns him not to reveal the truth, fearing that the shock could endanger her health.

The false story attracts people who hope to profit from his imaginary fortune. His friend attempts to protect him from opportunists, but his interference only creates further confusion. Matters become more complicated when two women claim to be engaged to the supposedly wealthy man. After his real sweetheart sees him embracing one of the women, she refuses to speak to him. The misunderstanding eventually leads to a confrontation between the women, after which he is reconciled with the woman he truly loves.

== Cast ==
- Richard "Skeets" Gallagher
- Dorothy Burgess
- Merna Kennedy
- Johnny Arthur
- Noah Beery
- Bert Roach
- Gay Seabrook
- Pauline Garon
- Ethel Wales
- Arthur Hoyt
- Walter Long
- Henry Roquemore
- Ted Adams
- Virginia Sale
- Leroy Boles
- Murdock MacQuarrie

== Production ==
The film's working title was Good Looking and Rich. According to the AFI Catalog of Feature Films, production began in late February 1933 at International Film Studios. Pauline Garon replaced Marjorie Beebe in a last-minute cast change.

== Bibliography ==
- Pitts, Michael R. Poverty Row Studios, 1929-1940. McFarland & Company, 2005.
