= Docks of San Francisco =

1932 film

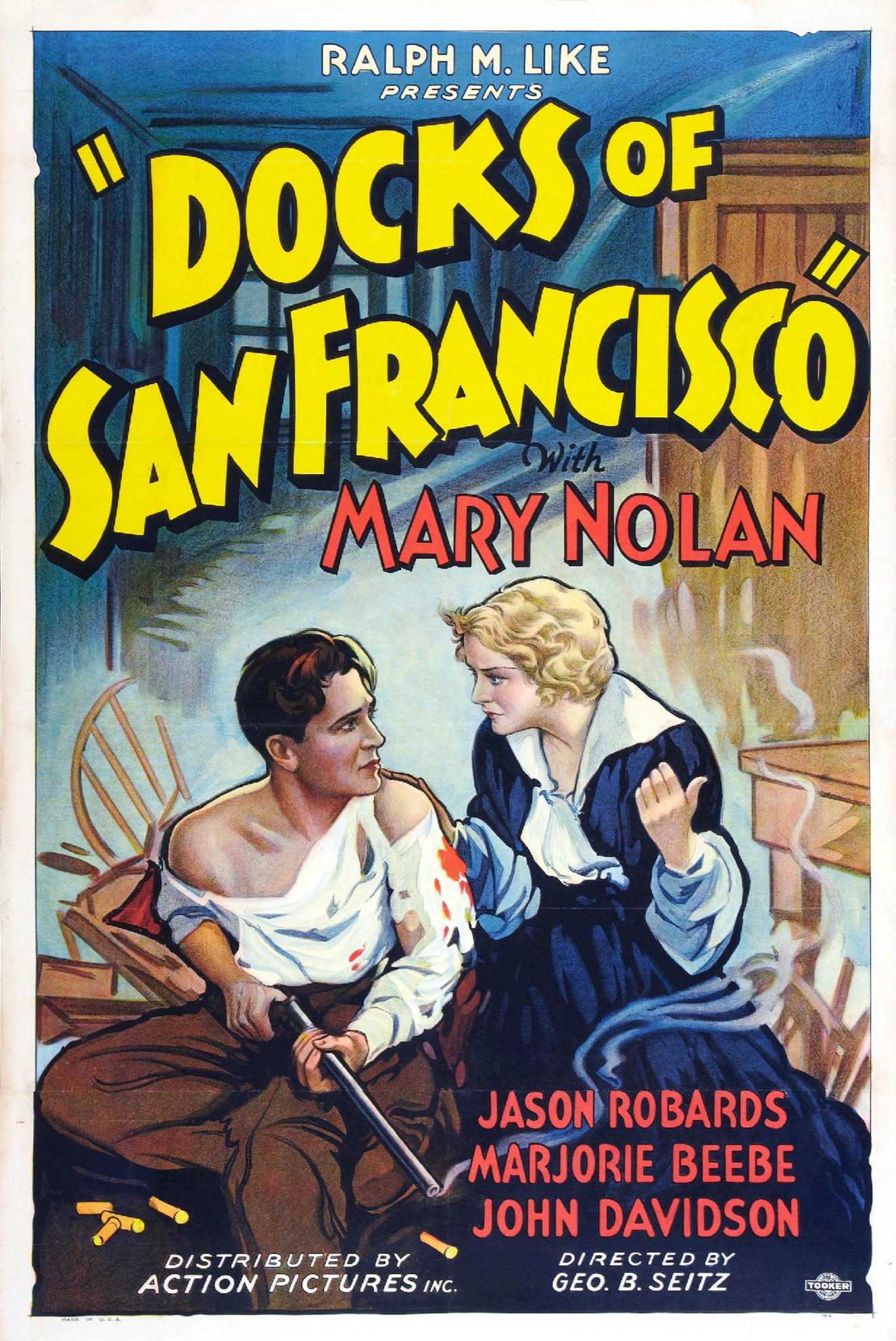
- Film poster
- Directed by: George B. Seitz
- Written by: H. H. Van Loan
- Produced by: Ralph M. Like; Cliff P. Broughton
- Starring: Mary Nolan; Jason Robards Sr. Marjorie Beebe
- Cinematography: Edward Cronjager
- Edited by: Ralph Dixon; Byron Robinson
- Production company: Action Pictures
- Distributed by: Mayfair Pictures
- Release date: February 1, 1932
- Running time: 64 minutes
- Country: United States
- Language: English

Docks of San Francisco is a 1932 American pre-Code crime film directed by George B. Seitz and starring Mary Nolan, Jason Robards Sr. and Marjorie Beebe. It was originally released by Mayfair Pictures, and later re-released by Commonwealth Pictures in 1948. The film was long considered to be a lost film but is now on YouTube.

== Plot ==
A café waitress becomes a small-time gangster's mistress and a novelist decides to rescue her from the gangster's clutches.

== Cast ==
- Mary Nolan as Belle
- Jason Robards Sr. as John Banning
- Marjorie Beebe as Rose Gillen
- John Davidson as Vance
- Max Davidson as Max Ranovich, the Detective
- Arthur Millett as Police Chief Rafferty
- Ernie Adams as Cookie
- Walter James as Phony Café Waiter
- George Chesebro as Vance's Henchman
- Hal Price as Vance's Henchman
- Charles McAvoy as Policeman
- Frank Meredith as Plainclothesman
- Paul Panzer as Café Waiter

== Bibliography ==
- Pitts, Michael R. Poverty Row Studios, 1929–1940: An Illustrated History of 55 Independent Film Companies, with a Filmography for Each. McFarland & Company, 2005.
