= The Monster Walks =

1932 film

- 1938 re-release poster under Astor Pictures
- Directed by: Frank R. Strayer
- Written by: Robert Ellis
- Produced by: Cliff P. Broughton; Ralph M. Like
- Starring: Rex Lease; Vera Reynolds; Sheldon Lewis; Mischa Auer
- Cinematography: Jules Cronjager
- Edited by: Byron Robinson
- Music by: Jean de la Roche; Charles Dunworth
- Production company: Action Pictures
- Distributed by: Mayfair Pictures
- Release date: February 7, 1932
- Running time: 60 minutes
- Country: United States
- Language: English

The Monster Walks is a 1932 American Pre-Code black-and-white horror film directed by Frank R. Strayer.

== Plot ==
The full film

The film opens with Ruth Earlton and her fiancé Dr. Ted Clayton arriving at her father's house. She has been told that her father has died, and is returning to find out what will be done with the estate. They arrive on a stormy night, and are greeted by her invalid uncle Robert, the housekeeper Mrs. Krug and the housekeeper's son Hanns.

While exploring the mansion, Ruth is dismayed to find a large ape her father used to conduct experiments in the basement. She and the others then gather to learn how the Earlton estate will be divided. Earlton has left his estate to Ruth, but it will go to her uncle Robert in the event of her death. Very small monthly sums are also left to the housekeeper Mrs. Krug and her son Hanns, and these two are very upset about the small amount of the allowance.

When Ruth goes to bed that night, a large, hairy hand reaches through the headboard and attempts to strangle her. When she screams, it disappears. Her fiancé and Mrs. Krug arrive at her room, and attempt to comfort her. Ted gives her a sleeping potion, and she falls asleep in a chair in her room while Mrs. Krug stays with her, taking the bed.

The hairy hand reappears through the headboard and strangles Mrs. Krug this time, killing her. Ruth awakens and alerts the rest of the household to what has happened. Afterward, Hanns Krug meets with Robert Earlton in secret, who tells him that their plan to kill Ruth Earlton has failed and Hanns has accidentally murdered his own mother. Hanns blames Robert for this, and after mentioning that Robert is actually his father, he strangles him as well, leaving him for dead.

Dr. Clayton visits Robert's room, and Robert regains consciousness. He tells Clayton about the plan he and Hanns had to murder Ruth, so that the estate would go to them instead. Clayton rushes out to find Ruth and warn her. She has already been taken by Hanns to the basement though, where he attempts to force the ape to kill her. The ape turns on him instead, killing him. Clayton arrives to find Ruth alive and well.

== Cast ==
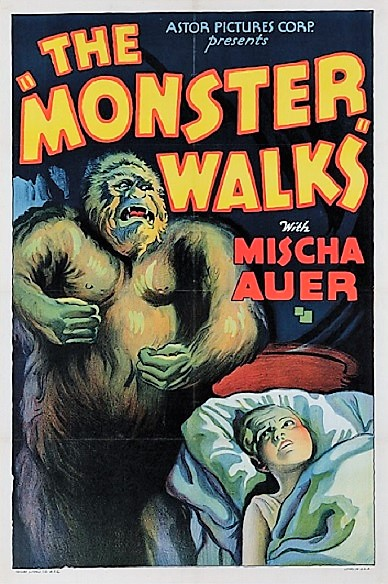
Theatrical release poster

In credits order

- Rex Lease as Dr Ted Clayton
- Vera Reynolds as Ruth Earlton
- Sheldon Lewis as Robert Earlton
- Mischa Auer as Hanns Krug
- Martha Mattox as Mrs. Emma Krug
- Sidney Bracey as Herbert Wilkes
- Sleep n' Eat as Exodus

== Release ==
The Monster Walks was originally distributed by Mayfair Pictures. It was re-released in 1938 by Astor Pictures and once more in 1948 by Commonwealth Pictures. The film was originally rejected by the British Board of Film Censors, but was eventually passed with a PG certificate in 2010.

=== Copyright status ===
The film's copyright has lapsed, placing it in the public domain in the United States and other countries.

== See also ==
- List of films in the public domain in the United States
