= Mounted Fury =

1931 film

- Theatrical release poster
- Directed by: Stuart Paton
- Screenplay by: Betty Burbridge
- Produced by: George W. Weeks
- Starring: John Bowers; Blanche Mehaffey; Robert Ellis; Frank Rice; George Regas; Lina Basquette
- Cinematography: William Nobles
- Edited by: Fred Bain
- Production company: George W. Weeks Productions
- Distributed by: Sono Art-World Wide Pictures
- Release date: December 1, 1931
- Running time: 63 minutes
- Country: United States
- Language: English

Mounted Fury is a 1931 American drama film directed by Stuart Paton and written by Betty Burbridge. The film stars John Bowers, Blanche Mehaffey, Robert Ellis, Frank Rice, George Regas and Lina Basquette. The film was released on December 1, 1931, by Sono Art-World Wide Pictures.

== Cast ==
- John Bowers as Jim Leyton
- Blanche Mehaffey as Enid Mash
- Robert Ellis as Paul Marsh
- Frank Rice as Sandy McNab
- George Regas as Pierre LeStrange
- Lina Basquette as Nanette LeStrange
- John Ince as Big McGraw
- Lloyd Whitlock as Dick Simpson
- Jack Trent as Phil Grover
