= Riot Squad (1933 film) =

1933 film by Harry S. Webb

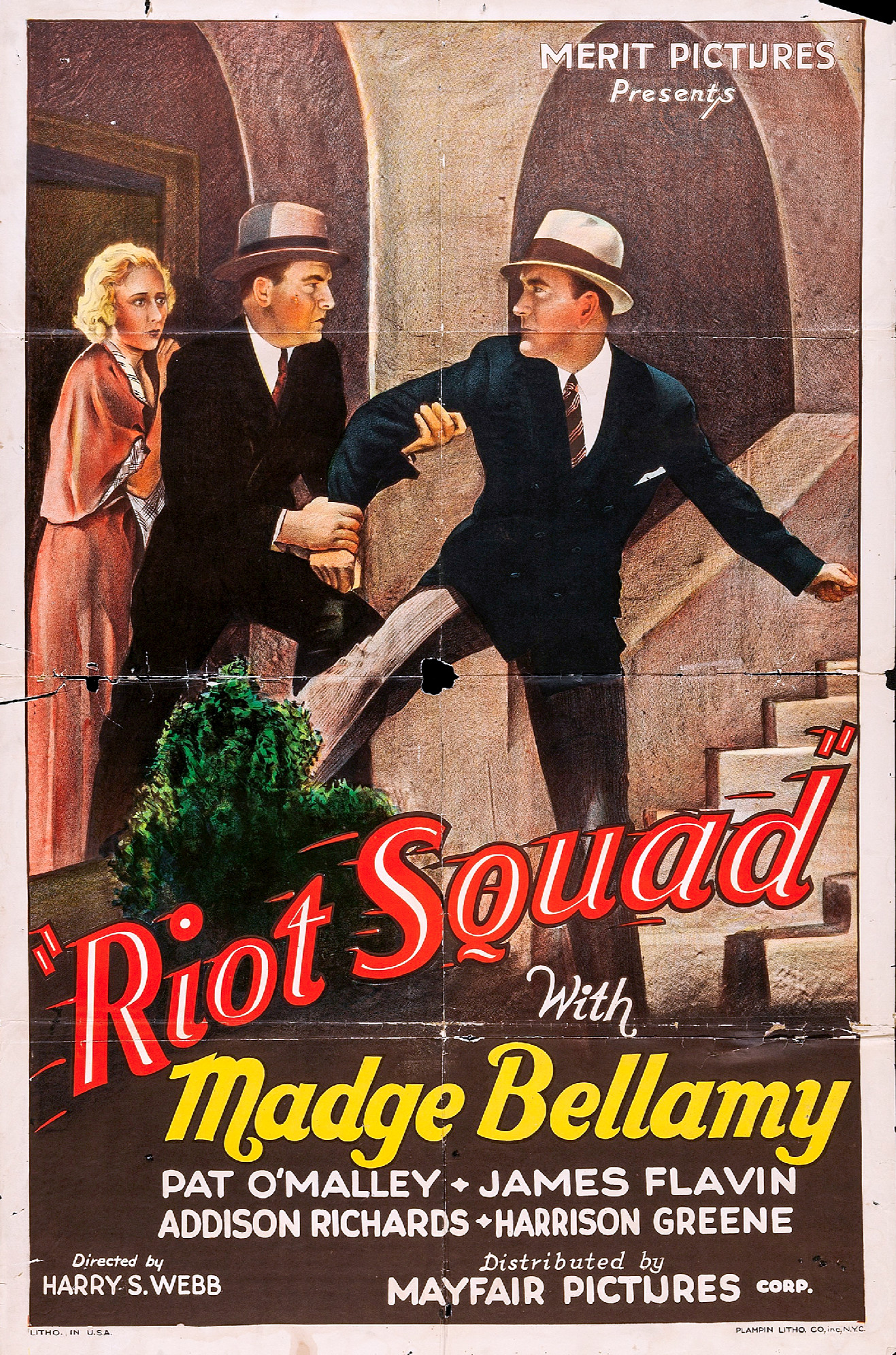
- Film poster
- Directed by: Harry S. Webb
- Written by: Jack Natteford; Barney A. Sarecky
- Produced by: Ralph M. Like; Harry S. Webb
- Starring: Madge Bellamy; Pat O'Malley; Addison Richards
- Cinematography: Roy F. Overbaugh
- Edited by: Fred Bain
- Production company: Merit Pictures
- Distributed by: Mayfair Pictures
- Release date: July 26, 1933
- Running time: 62 minutes
- Country: United States
- Language: English

Riot Squad is a 1933 American pre-Code crime film directed by Harry S. Webb and starring Madge Bellamy, Pat O'Malley and Addison Richards. It was produced as a second feature and distributed by the independent company Mayfair Pictures.

== Plot ==
Police detectives trying to nail notorious gangster Nolan and his henchman Diamonds Jareck infiltrate the nightclub Nolan operates with the assistance of Lil Daley, who works there. Two detectives with a friendly rivalry are dropped from the detective department and transferred to the riot squad. There they continue to work at the case.

== Cast ==
- Madge Bellamy as Lil Daley
- Pat O'Malley as Det. Bob Larkin
- James Flavin as Det. Mack McCue
- Addison Richards as Diamonds Jareck
- Harrison Greene as Nolan
- Ralph Lewis as Judge Nathaniel Moore
- Alene Carroll as Peggy Moore
- Bee Eddels as Ruth - Lil's Maid
- Kit Guard as Pug - Henchman
- Charles De La Motte as Shorty - Henchman
- John Elliott as Chief of Detectives

== Bibliography ==
- Pitts, Michael R. Poverty Row Studios, 1929–1940: An Illustrated History of 55 Independent Film Companies, with a Filmography for Each. McFarland & Company, 2005.
