= Gorilla Ship =

1932 film directed by Frank R. Strayer

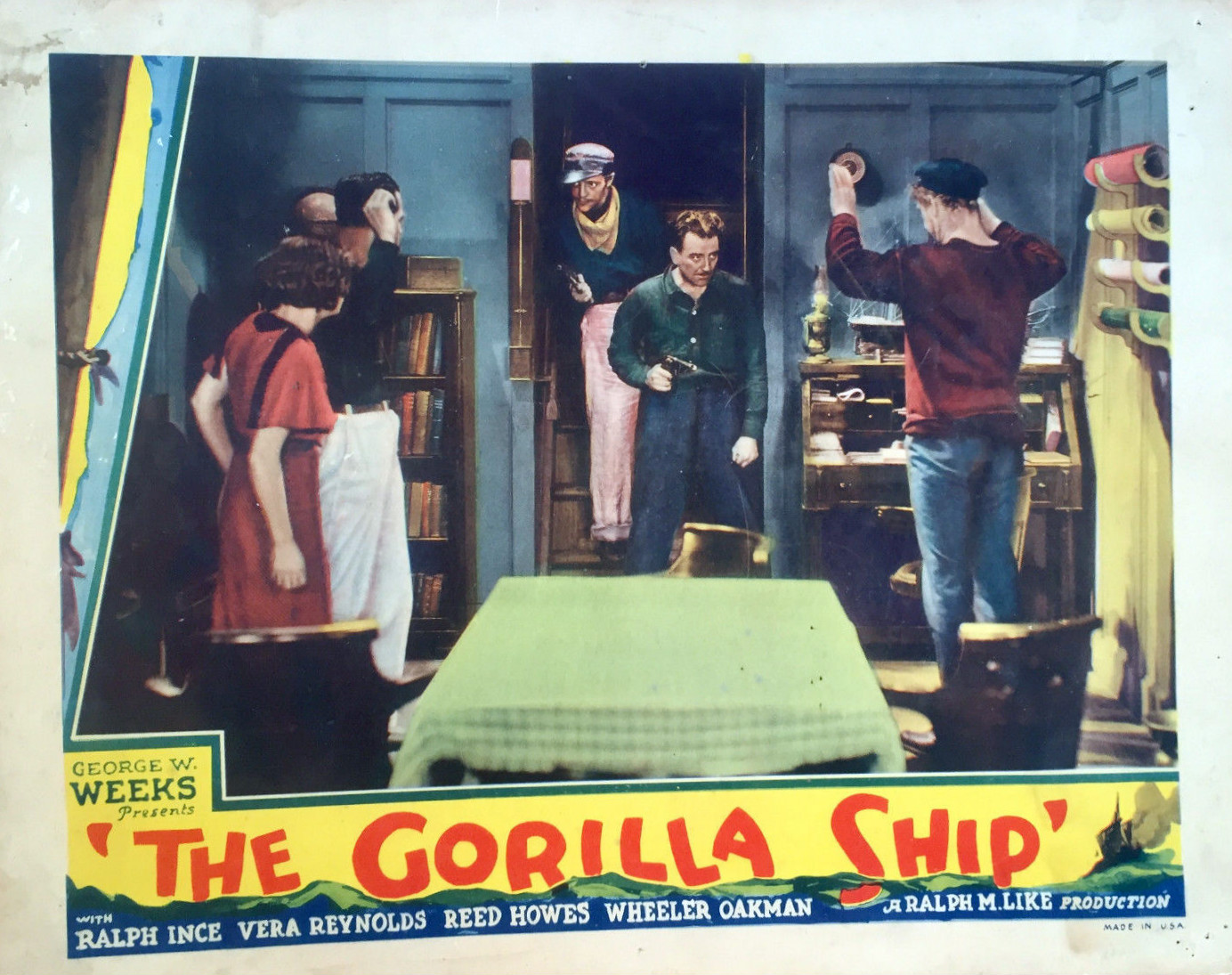
- Lobby card
- Directed by: Frank Strayer
- Written by: George Waggner
- Produced by: Cliff Broughton
- Starring: Ralph Ince; Vera Reynolds; Reed Howes
- Cinematography: Jules Cronjager
- Edited by: Byron Robinson
- Production companies: Ralph M. Like, Ltd.
- Distributed by: Mayfair Pictures
- Release date: June 11, 1932 (US)
- Running time: 66 minutes
- Country: United States
- Language: English

Gorilla Ship is a 1932 American pre-Code drama film directed by Frank Strayer from an original screenplay by George Waggner. Starring Ralph Ince, Vera Reynolds, and Reed Howes, the film was produced by Ralph M. Like, Ltd. and distributed by Mayfair Pictures. It was released on June 11, 1932.

== Cast ==
- Ralph Ince as Captain "Gorilla" Larson
- Vera Reynolds as Helen Wells
- Reed Howes as Dave Burton
- Wheeler Oakman as Philip Wells
- James Bradbury Jr. as Dumb sailor
- Erin La Brissoniere as Girl friend
- George Chesebro as Smith, the first mate
- Ben Hall as Benny, the cabin boy
