= Daniel Boone (1936 film) =

1936 American historical film

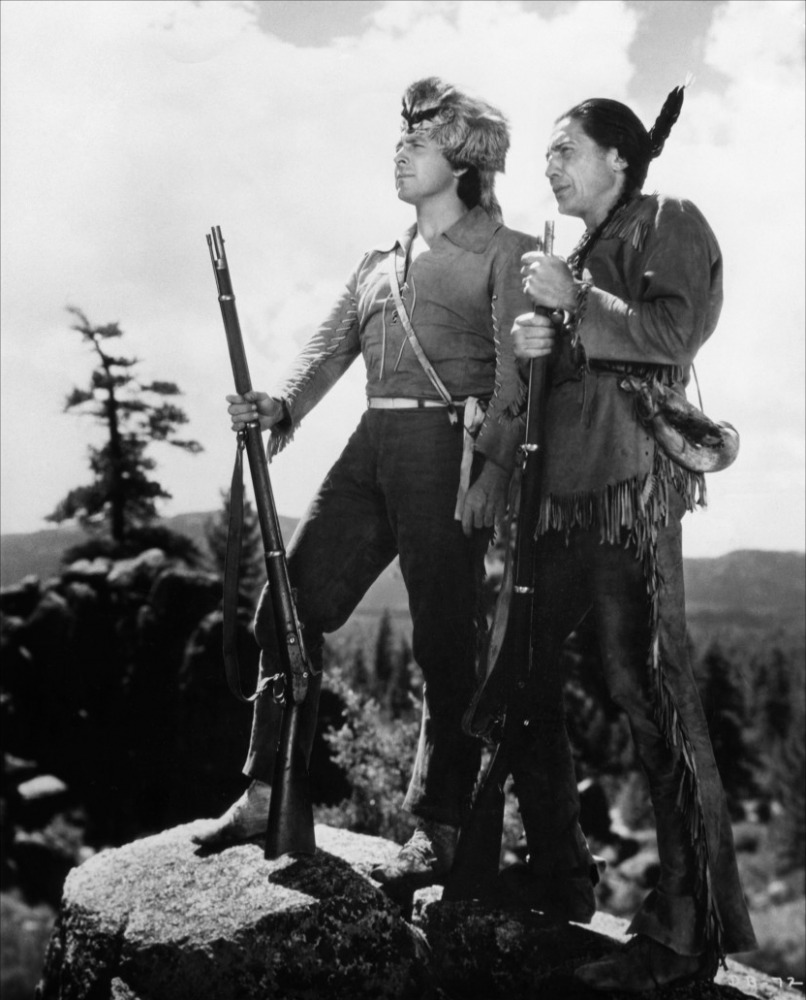
- Film still
- Directed by: David Howard
- Written by: Edgecumb Pinchon (story); Daniel Jarrett (screenplay)
- Produced by: George Hirliman (producer); Leonard Goldstein (associate producer)
- Starring: George O'Brien; Heather Angel; John Carradine
- Cinematography: Frank B. Good
- Edited by: Ralph Dixon
- Music by: Arthur Kay; Hugo Riesenfeld
- Distributed by: RKO Pictures
- Release date: October 16, 1936
- Running time: 75 minutes
- Country: United States
- Language: English

Daniel Boone is a 1936 American historical film directed by David Howard and starring George O'Brien, Heather Angel, and John Carradine.

== Plot ==
The full film

In 1775, American pioneer and frontiersman Daniel Boone leads thirty colonial families to Kentucky where they face two threats: Native American raiders led by renegade white Simon Girty, who opposes the colony; and the schemes of effete Stephen Marlowe to seize title to the new lands. Perils, battles, escapes, and a love interest round out the film.

== Cast ==
- George O'Brien as Daniel Boone
- Heather Angel as Virginia Randolph
- John Carradine as Simon Girty
- Ralph Forbes as Stephen Marlowe
- George Regas as Black Eagle
- Dickie Jones as Master Jerry Randolph
- Clarence Muse as Pompey
- Huntley Gordon as Sir John Randolph
- Harry Cording as Joe Burch
- Aggie Herring as Mrs. Mary Burch
- Crauford Kent as Attorney General
- Keith Hitchcock as Commissioner
- Chief John Big Tree as Wyandotte Warrior (uncredited)
- Dick Curtis as John Finch - Frontiersman (uncredited)
- Baron James Lichter as Ben Stevens (uncredited)
- John Merton as Messenger from Richmond (uncredited)
- Edward Peil, Sr. as Frontiersman in Lone Wagon (uncredited)
- Tom Ricketts as Attorney General's Associate (uncredited)

== Soundtrack ==
- Clarence Muse - "Roll on, Wheel" (Written by Clarence Muse)
- Clarence Muse - "Make Way" (Written by Jack Stern, Grace Hamilton and Harry Tobias)
- Chorus - "In My Garden" (Music by Jack Stern, lyrics by Grace Hamilton)

== See also ==
- List of films about the American Revolution
