= What's Your Racket? =

1934 film

- Directed by: Fred Guiol
- Written by: Barry Barringer; George Rogan
- Produced by: Ralph M. Like
- Starring: Regis Toomey; Noel Francis; J. Carrol Naish.
- Cinematography: James S. Brown Jr.
- Edited by: Dan Milner
- Production company: Ralph M. Like Productions
- Distributed by: Mayfair Pictures
- Release date: March 6, 1934
- Running time: 64 minutes
- Country: United States
- Language: English

What's Your Racket? is a 1934 American Pre-Code crime film directed by Fred Guiol and starring Regis Toomey, Noel Francis and J. Carrol Naish. It was produced on Poverty Row by independent studio Mayfair Pictures.

== Plot ==
Mae Cosgrove, a nightclub hostess, carries out a robbery on the safe of a gangster's palatial home. The man she has robbed suspects another gang leader of ordering the job, leading to a dispute between them. In fact she is the daughter of a man framed for robbery by the gangs who is trying to gain enough evidence to free him.

== Cast ==
- Regis Toomey as Bert Miller
- Noel Francis as Mae Cosgrove
- J. Carrol Naish as Dick Graves
- Creighton Hale as Chief
- Fred Malatesta as Benton
- May Wallace as Mrs. Cosgrove
- Lew Kelly as Cameron

== Bibliography ==
- Pitts, Michael R. Poverty Row Studios, 1929–1940: An Illustrated History of 55 Independent Film Companies, with a Filmography for Each. McFarland & Company, 2005.
