= Temptation's Workshop =

1932 film

- Directed by: George B. Seitz
- Written by: Norman Battle
- Produced by: George W. Weeks
- Starring: Helen Foster; Tyrell Davis; Dorothy Granger
- Cinematography: Otto Himm
- Edited by: Byron Robinson
- Production company: Action Pictures
- Distributed by: Mayfair Pictures; Butcher's Film Service (UK)
- Release date: January 20, 1932
- Running time: 60 minutes
- Country: United States
- Language: English

Temptation's Workshop is a 1932 American pre-Code drama film directed by George B. Seitz and starring Helen Foster, Tyrell Davis and Dorothy Granger. It was released by the independent Poverty Row studio Mayfair Pictures.

== Plot ==
When Wall Street financier John Lawton falls ill and goes bankrupt, his children attempt to adjust to the loss of their wealthy upbringing.

== Cast ==
- Helen Foster as Connie Lawton
- Tyrell Davis as Count Emile Borosko
- Dorothy Granger as Vi Rantler
- Carroll Nye as Bob Lawton
- John Ince as John Lawton
- Stella Adams as Mrs. John Lawton

== Bibliography ==
- Pitts, Michael R. Poverty Row Studios, 1929–1940: An Illustrated History of 55 Independent Film Companies, with a Filmography for Each. McFarland & Company, 2005.
