= Malay Nights =

1932 film

- Directed by: E. Mason Hopper
- Written by: Glenn Ellis; John T. Neville
- Produced by: Ralph M. Like; George W. Weeks; Cliff P. Broughton
- Starring: Johnny Mack Brown; Dorothy Burgess; Raymond Hatton.
- Cinematography: Jules Cronjager
- Edited by: Byron Robinson
- Production company: Action Pictures
- Distributed by: Mayfair Pictures
- Release date: November 4, 1932
- Running time: 63 minutes
- Country: United States
- Language: English

Malay Nights is a 1932 American pre-Code drama film directed by E. Mason Hopper and starring Johnny Mack Brown, Dorothy Burgess and Raymond Hatton. It was produced on Poverty Row as a second feature for release by Mayfair Pictures. It is also known by the alternative title Shadows of Singapore.

== Plot ==
Pearl hunter Jim Wilson is on a visit to San Francisco from the Malay Peninsula when he encounters his old nemesis the card sharp Jack Sheldon. Jim tries to rescue Sheldon's girlfriend and her young son from his clutches. A series of mix-ups lead to Jim and her son returning to Singapore without her, and she has to work in a nightclub and bar to earn her passage. She arrives in time to help Jim beat off a deadly attack by Sheldon and his gang.

== Cast ==
- Johnny Mack Brown as Jim Wilson
- Dorothy Burgess as Eve Blake
- Ralph Ince as Jack Sheldon
- Raymond Hatton as Rance Danvers
- Carmelita Geraghty as Daisy
- Georgie Smith as Sonny
- Lionel Belmore as Buck, the bartender
- Mary Jane Irving as Salvation Lass
- Ted Adams as Sailor
- Dorothy Vernon as Tenement Neighbor
- Pat Harmon as Sheldon's Henchman
- Blackie Whiteford as Poker Player

== Bibliography ==
- Pitts, Michael R. Poverty Row Studios, 1929–1940: An Illustrated History of 55 Independent Film Companies, with a Filmography for Each. McFarland & Company, 2005.
