= Dynamite Denny =

1932 film directed by Frank R. Strayer

- DVD cover for the film
- Directed by: Frank R. Strayer
- Written by: W. Scott Darling; Barry Barringer
- Produced by: Ralph M. Like
- Starring: Jay Wilsey; Blanche Mehaffey; William V. Mong
- Cinematography: Jules Cronjager
- Edited by: Byron Robinson
- Production company: Action Pictures
- Distributed by: Mayfair Pictures
- Release date: May 27, 1932 (US)
- Running time: 52 minutes
- Country: United States
- Language: English

Dynamite Denny is a 1932 American drama film directed by Frank R. Strayer from an original screenplay by W. Scott Darling. The film stars Jay Wilsey, Blanche Mehaffey, and William V. Mong. Produced by Action Pictures, it was distributed through Mayfair pictures, and was released on May 27, 1932.

== Cast ==
- Jay Wilsey as Denny
- Blanche Mehaffey as Mary, chairman of the board's daughter
- William V. Mong as William B. Marston, chairman of the board
- Walter Perry as Jim Dayton
- Matthew Betz as Labor agitator
- Fern Emmett as Marston's Nurse

== Reception ==
The Chico Enterprise gave the film a good review, stating that "fans...will get their money's worth of thrills..." The Daily News also gave the picture a good review, saying, "For thrills, romance and laughter, don't fail to see "Dynamite Denny"...It has about everything in the way of action and thrills that could possible be crammed into one picture without making it cause nightmares for its audience. The Film Daily gave the film a good review, leading with, "Railroad melodrama that packs a fair punch and a few old-time thrills. They singled out Blanche Mehaffey's performance, and also felt the direction was good, while only giving the cinematography an okay rating.
