= Love in High Gear =

1932 film

- Directed by: Frank Strayer
- Screenplay by: Douglas Donaldson Jr. George B. Seitz; Edward T. Lowe Jr.
- Produced by: Ralph M. Like; George W. Weeks
- Starring: Harrison Ford; Alberta Vaughn; Tyrell Davis
- Cinematography: Jules Cronjager
- Edited by: Byron Robinson
- Production company: Ralph M. Like Productions
- Distributed by: Mayfair Pictures
- Release date: May 1, 1932
- Running time: 66 minutes
- Country: United States
- Language: English

Love in High Gear is a 1932 American pre-Code comedy film directed by Frank R. Strayer and starring silent veteran Harrison Ford in his final film role and only talkie, and co–starring Alberta Vaughn, Tyrell Davis and Arthur Hoyt. It was released by the independent Mayfair Pictures.

== Plot ==
Ronald and Betty plan to elope, but are overheard by a jewel thief who has just stolen a pearl necklace from the wedding Ronald and Betty were attending. The jewel thief plans to use the situation to his advantage and a mad chase ensues towards the end of the film.

== Cast ==
- Harrison Ford as Donald Ransome
- Alberta Vaughn as Betty
- Tyrell Davis as Ronald Courtney
- Arthur Hoyt as Thaddeus Heath
- Ethel Wales as Arabella Heath
- Fred Kelsey as Detective Duffy
- Fern Emmett as hotel maid
- Jack Duffy as hotel proprietor
- William H. Strauss as Ziegman
- Nanette Vallon as Senorita del Val
- John Ince as minister

== Bibliography ==
- Pitts, Michael R. Poverty Row Studios, 1929–1940: An Illustrated History of 55 Independent Film Companies, with a Filmography for Each. McFarland & Company, 2005.
