= Ferike Boros =

American actress (1873–1951)

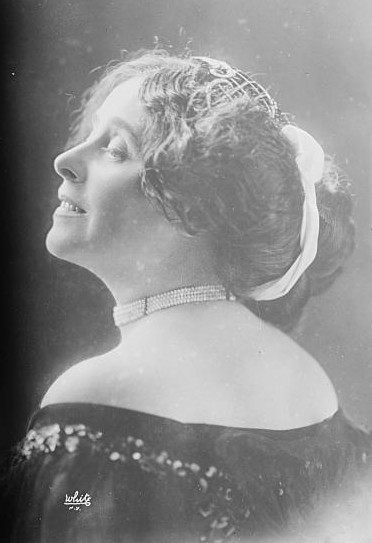
- Born: Ferike Weinstock; August 3, 1873; Nagyvárad, Austria-Hungary
- Died: January 16, 1951 (aged 77); Hollywood, California, U.S.
- Resting place: Glen Haven Memorial Park, Sylmar, Los Angeles, U.S.
- Years active: 1918–1949

Ferike Boros (3 August 1873 – 16 January 1951) was a Hungarian-born American stage and movie actress.

== Biography ==
Ferike Weinstock was born in Nagyvárad, Austria-Hungary, in 1873, Boros was on stage starting in 1893. She moved to London in 1903, two years later appearing at Covent Garden. In Hungary, she performed in the National Court Theatre (NCT) in Budapest.

In 1909, while still with the NCT, she visited the United States and Canada as part of a trip around the world to report on how dramatic productions were staged in each country that she visited.

As she visited various theatrical managers in New York City, she regularly encountered rejection despite her official letter (written in English) from the NCT. In one office she was told, "Oh, Mr. Belasco is flooded with crazy communications from freaks and fakirs and cranks ..."

After being well-coached in English and the conventions of American show business, she had a long career on the Broadway stage and in theatrical touring companies, from 1909 through 1927; thereafter she was seen in character roles in motion pictures.

Boros' Broadway acting credits included Chicago (1926), The Kreutzer Sonata (1924), Rachel (1913), and The Wife Decides (1911). She also translated the Broadway play Seven Sisters (1911).

Boros went to Hollywood in 1930, acting in character roles for several studios. A fall in 1936 injured her hip, which both ended her income and brought about expensive medical treatment. In order to pay her bills, she mortgaged her house, sold most of her possessions, got rid of her servants, and began receiving $10 per week in relief payments. She returned to acting with a one-minute appearance in Love Affair (1939).

Although her screen roles were mostly in the supporting category, she performed and contributed to the plot in popular films such as Once Upon a Honeymoon and A Tree Grows in Brooklyn.

== Death ==
Boros died at her residence in Van Nuys, California, on 16 January 1951, aged 77.

== Filmography ==
- Her Boy (1918) as Mrs. Schultz
- The Younger Generation (1929) as Delancey Street Woman (uncredited)
- Born Reckless (1930) as Ma Beretti
- Ladies Love Brutes (1930) as Mrs. Forziati
- Little Caesar (1931) as Mrs. Passa (uncredited)
- Gentleman's Fate (1931) as Angela (as Ferike Beros)
- Svengali (1931) as Marta (uncredited)
- Bought! (1931) as Minor Role (uncredited)
- Private Lives (1931) as Cook at Chalet (uncredited)
- World and the Flesh (1932) as Sasha
- Huddle (1932) as Mrs. Amatto
- No Living Witness (1932) as Nick's Mother
- Uptown New York (1932) as Elderly Woman (uncredited)
- Humanity (1933) as Mrs. Bernstein
- Song of the Eagle (1933) as Cook (uncredited)
- Rafter Romance (1933) as Rosie Eckbaum (uncredited)
- Eight Girls in a Boat (1934) as Frau Kruger
- The Fountain (1934) as Nurse
- Symphony of Living (1935) as Mary Schultz
- Black Fury (1935) as Wife of Hospitalized Miner (uncredited)
- Hi, Gaucho! (1935) as Emelia - Inez's Dueña (uncredited)
- Make Way for Tomorrow (1937) as Mrs. Sarah Rubens (uncredited)
- Love Affair (1939) as Terry's Landlady (uncredited)
- Bachelor Mother (1939) as Mrs. Weiss
- Stronger Than Desire (1939) as Mrs. D'Amoro
- Fifth Avenue Girl (1939) as Olga
- Dust Be My Destiny (1939) as Delicatessen Proprietress
- Rio (1939) as Maria (as Ferika Boras)
- The Light That Failed (1939) as Madame Binat
- Three Cheers for the Irish (1940) as Tenement Woman (uncredited)
- Lillian Russell (1940) as Mrs. Rose
- La Conga Nights (1940) as Mama O'Brien
- Girl from God's Country (1940) as Mrs. Broken Thumb
- Argentine Nights (1940) as Mama Viejos
- Christmas in July (1940) as Mrs. Schwartz
- Gallant Sons (1940) as Madame Wachek
- Sleepers West (1941) as Farm Lady
- Caught in the Draft (1941) as Yetta
- Private Nurse (1941)as Mrs. Sarah Goldberg
- Unfinished Business (1941) as Sarah (uncredited)
- The Pied Piper (1942) as Madame
- The Talk of the Town (1942) as Mrs. Pulaski (uncredited)
- Once Upon a Honeymoon (1942) as the maid Elsa
- Margin for Error (1943) as Mrs. Finkelstein (uncredited)
- They Got Me Covered (1943) as Laughing Hotel Maid (uncredited)
- Princess O'Rourke (1943) Mrs. Anna Pulaski (uncredited)
- The Doughgirls (1944) as Irena (uncredited)
- A Tree grows in Brooklyn (1945) as Grandma Rommely (uncredited)
- This Love of Ours (1945) as Housekeeper
- Specter of the Rose (1946) as Mamochka
- High Conquest (1947) as Grandmother on Train
- East Side, West Side (1949) as Rosa's Grandma Sistina (uncredited) (final film role)
