= Chinatown After Dark =

1931 film

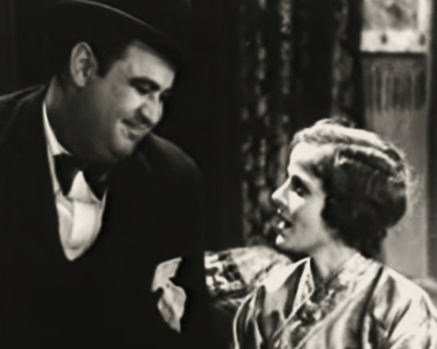
- Billy Gilbert and Barbara Kent in Chinatown After Dark
- Directed by: Stuart Paton
- Written by: Betty Burbridge
- Produced by: Ralph M. Like; Cliff P. Broughton
- Starring: Carmel Myers; Rex Lease; Barbara Kent
- Cinematography: Jules Cronjager
- Edited by: Byron Robinson; Viola Roehl
- Music by: Lee Zahler
- Production company: Action Pictures
- Distributed by: Mayfair Pictures
- Release date: October 15, 1931
- Running time: 59 minutes
- Country: United States
- Language: English

Chinatown After Dark is a 1931 American pre-Code drama film directed by Stuart Paton and starring Carmel Myers, Rex Lease and Barbara Kent.

== Cast ==
- Carmel Myers as Madame Ying Su
- Rex Lease as James 'Jim' Bonner
- Barbara Kent as Lotus
- Edmund Breese as Le Fong
- Frank Mayo as Ralph Bonner
- Billy Gilbert as Horatio Dooley
- Michael Visaroff as Mr. Varonoff
- Laska Winter as Ming Fu
- Willie Fung as Ling Chi
- George Chesebro as Varonoff's Henchman
- Lloyd Whitlock as Detective Captain
- James B. Leong as Servant

== See also ==
- Yellowface

== Bibliography ==
- Pitts, Michael R. Poverty Row Studios, 1929–1940: An Illustrated History of 55 Independent Film Companies, with a Filmography for Each. McFarland & Company, 2005.
