= Dragnet Patrol =

1931 film directed by Frank R. Strayer

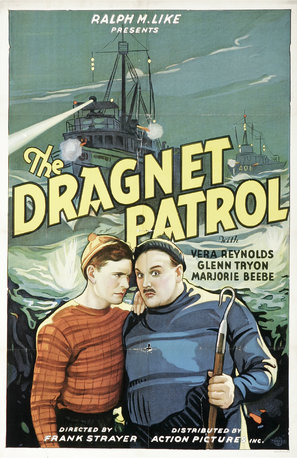
- Poster for the film
- Directed by: Frank R. Strayer
- Written by: W. Scott Darling
- Produced by: Ralph M. Like
- Starring: Glenn Tryon; Vera Reynolds; Marjorie Beebe
- Cinematography: Jules Cronjager
- Edited by: Byron Robinson
- Production company: Action Pictures
- Distributed by: Mayfair Pictures
- Release date: December 15, 1931 (US)
- Running time: 60 minutes
- Country: United States
- Language: English

Dragnet Patrol is a 1931 American Pre-Code melodrama film directed by Frank R. Strayer from a script by W. Scott Darling. The film stars Glenn Tryon, Vera Reynolds, and Marjorie Beebe, and was released by Action Pictures on December 15, 1931.

== Cast ==
- Glenn Tryon as Larry
- Vera Reynolds as Millie
- Marjorie Beebe as Mabel
- Vernon Dent as Cookie
- Symona Boniface as Ethel
- Walter Long as Grainger
- George Hayes as Private detective

== Reception ==
The Press of Atlantic City gave the picture a good review calling it, "an unpretentious picture, but fairly entertaining. Photoplay, however, did not enjoy the picture, calling it a "banal ballad in celluloid", and considering it a kindness not to mention who was in the cast. The Motion Picture Herald gave the film a positive review, saying it had a good share of action, romance, and domestic intrigue. While The Film Daily also gave the film a positive review, feeling the direction was okay and the photography was good. They stated the film was "nicely balanced with human interest angles gets over with plenty of fast action."
