= The Heart Punch =

1932 film

- Directed by: B. Reeves Eason
- Screenplay by: John T. Neville
- Produced by: Ralph M. Like; Fanchon Royer; George W. Weeks
- Starring: Lloyd Hughes; Marion Shilling; George J. Lewis
- Cinematography: George Meehan
- Edited by: Jeanne Spencer
- Production company: Ralph M. Like Productions
- Distributed by: Mayfair Pictures
- Release date: October 18, 1932
- Running time: 70 minutes
- Country: United States
- Language: English

The Heart Punch is a 1932 American pre-Code melodrama film directed by B. Reeves Eason, and starring Lloyd Hughes, Marion Shilling and Mae Busch. It was one of the first films from Mayfair Pictures. The film's sets were designed by the art director Paul Palmentola.

== Plot ==
A prizefighter named Jimmy Milligan (a.k.a. the Cyclone Kid) meets his sweetheart's brother in the ring and accidentally kills him. She forgives him after he promises not to fight again. After his sweetheart goes to jail, however, he is compelled to set up one more fight in order to raise funds for her trial.

== Cast ==
- Lloyd Hughes as Jimmy Milligan
- Marion Shilling as Kitty Doyle
- George J. Lewis as Lefty Doyle
- Mae Busch as Goldie Zenius
- Wheeler Oakman as Spike Patterson
- Walter Miller as Joe Zenias
- James B. Leong as Wong
- Gordon De Main as Defense Attorney Benton
- Hal Price as Mr. Webster
- Edward Peil Sr. as Prosecutor
- Tammany Young as Benny, the Waiter
- Henry Hall as Judge
- Kit Guard as Man Outside Gym

== Reception ==
Critics called the film "swell entertainment," lauding the picture for its "two realistic fights."

== Bibliography ==
- Pitts, Michael R. Poverty Row Studios, 1929–1940: An Illustrated History of 55 Independent Film Companies, with a Filmography for Each. McFarland & Company, 2005.
