= Soul of the Slums =

1931 film directed by Frank R. Strayer

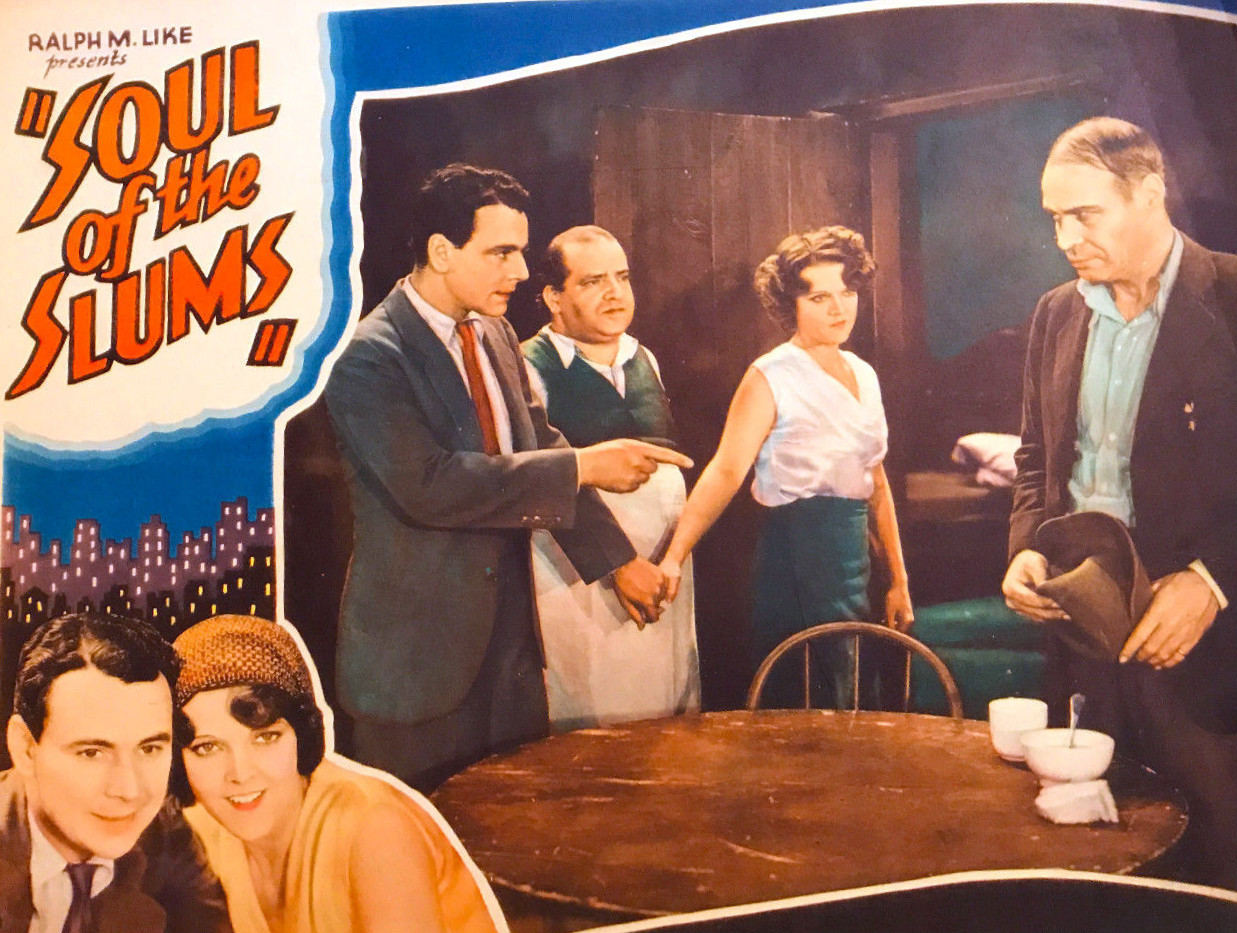
- Directed by: Frank R. Strayer
- Written by: W. Scott Darling
- Produced by: Ralph M. Like; Cliff P. Broughton
- Starring: William Collier Jr. Blanche Mehaffey; Murray Smith
- Cinematography: Jules Cronjager
- Edited by: Byron Robinson
- Music by: Lee Zahler
- Production company: Action Pictures
- Distributed by: Mayfair Pictures
- Release date: November 15, 1931 (US)
- Running time: 64 minutes
- Country: United States
- Language: English

Soul of the Slums is a 1931 American Pre-Code crime melodrama directed by Frank R. Strayer from an original screenplay by W. Scott Darling. The film stars William Collier Jr., Blanche Mehaffey, and Murray Smith, and was released by Action Pictures on November 15, 1931.

== Cast ==
- William Collier Jr. as Jerry Harris
- Blanche Mehaffey as Molly
- Murray Smith as Spike
- James Bradbury Jr. as Dummy
- Walter Long as Pete Thompson
- Paul Weigel as Brother Jacob
- Max Asher as Pawnbroker
