= Sheer Luck =

1931 film

- Directed by: Bruce M. Mitchell
- Written by: Bruce Mitchell
- Starring: Jobyna Ralston; Nick Stuart; Philo McCullough
- Cinematography: Paul H. Allen
- Edited by: Viola Roehl
- Production company: Big 4 Film
- Distributed by: Big 4 Film
- Release date: January 26, 1931
- Running time: 56 minutes
- Country: United States
- Language: English

Sheer Luck is a 1931 American crime film directed by Bruce M. Mitchell and starring Jobyna Ralston, Nick Stuart and Philo McCullough.

== Cast ==
- Jobyna Ralston as Betty Carver
- Nick Stuart as Jimmie Reid
- Bobby Vernon as Archibald Smith
- Philo McCullough as Milton Blackburn
- Reed Howes as 'Rabbit' Rossi
- Margaret Landis as Mrs. Hiram Carver
- John Ince as Hiram Carver
- Oscar Smith as Washington Jefferson Smith
- Margaret Irving as Patsy
- Tom London as Police Lieutenant

== Bibliography ==
- Michael R. Pitts. Poverty Row Studios, 1929–1940: An Illustrated History of 55 Independent Film Companies, with a Filmography for Each. McFarland & Company, 2005.
