= Harry Strang =

American actor

- Born: December 13, 1892; Clifton, Virginia, U.S.
- Died: April 10, 1972 (aged 79); Los Angeles, California, U.S.
- Occupation: Actor
- Years active: 1929–1965

Harry Strang (December 13, 1892 – April 10, 1972) was an American actor. He appeared in more than 500 films and television shows between 1929 and 1965. On Broadway, Strang appeared in The Girl in the Train (1910).

Primarily a character actor, Strang often appeared in film roles that included clerks in stores, policemen on beats, and soldiers. He also was often seen in two-reel comedies made by RKO Radio Pictures. His work on television included appearances on Maverick, One Step Beyond, and Perry Mason.

Strang was a machine-gun instructor for recruits in the United States Marines.

== Partial filmography ==
- The Greene Murder Case (1929) - Cop in House (uncredited)
- Illusion (1929) - Military Man in Rifle Act (uncredited)
- Around the Corner (1930)
- The Last Parade (1931)
- Hell Bound (1931)
- The Widow in Scarlet (1932)
- The Final Edition (1932)
- Alias Mary Smith (1932)
- King Kong (1933) - Policeman at Headquarters (uncredited)
- The Ghost Walks (1934)
- Hearts in Bondage (1936)
- Ranger Courage (1936)
- The Unknown Ranger (1936)
- Yellow Cargo (1936)
- Zorro Rides Again (1937)
- Gunsmoke Trail (1938)
- Midnight Taxi (1937)
- Phantom Ranger (1938)
- The Purple Vigilantes (1938)
- Squadron of Honor (1938)
- Two Gun Justice (1938)
- Convict's Code (1939)
- Mr. Moto Takes a Vacation (1939)
- The Fatal Hour (1940)
- Kit Carson (1940)
- Pier 13 (1940)
- Mutiny in the Arctic (1941)
- Who Done It? (1942)
- Manhunt of Mystery Island (1945)
- The Devil's Mask (1946)
- Philo Vance's Secret Mission (1947)
- Michael O'Halloran (1948)
- Twilight in the Sierras (1950)
- Calling Homicide (1956)
- Highway Patrol (1956)
- Looking for Danger (1957)
- North by Northwest (1959) - Assistant Conductor (uncredited)
- One Foot in Hell (1960) - Townsman (uncredited)
- Lawman (1962 in the episode titled "The Bride") - Ed Lecky
