= Tangled Destinies =

1932 film

- Directed by: Frank R. Strayer
- Written by: Edward T. Lowe Jr. (story and adaptation)
- Produced by: Ralph M. Like; George W. Weeks
- Starring: See below
- Cinematography: Jules Cronjager
- Edited by: Byron Robinson
- Music by: Lee Zahler
- Production company: Ralph M. Like Productions
- Distributed by: Mayfair Pictures
- Release date: October 18, 1932
- Running time: 56 minutes
- Country: United States
- Language: English

Tangled Destinies is a 1932 pre-Code American murder mystery film directed by Frank R. Strayer. The film is also known as Who Killed Harvey Forbes? in the United Kingdom.

== Plot ==
After a plane makes an emergency landing, passengers take refuge in a deserted house, but one of them is a killer.

== Cast ==
- Gene Morgan as Capt. Randall "Randy" Gordon
- Doris Hill as Doris
- Glenn Tryon as Tommy Preston, the Co-pilot
- Vera Reynolds as Ruth, the Airline Stewardess
- Ethel Wales as Prudence Daggott
- Monaei Lindley as Monica van Buren
- Syd Saylor as Buchanan, the Prizefighter
- Sidney Bracey as McGinnis, posing as Professor Marmont
- Lloyd Whitlock as Floyd Martin
- James B. Leong as Ling
- William P. Burt as Harvey Forbes
- Henry Hall as Dr. Wingate, the Parson
- William Humphrey as Professor Hartley
