= Blanche Mehaffey =

American showgirl and film actress

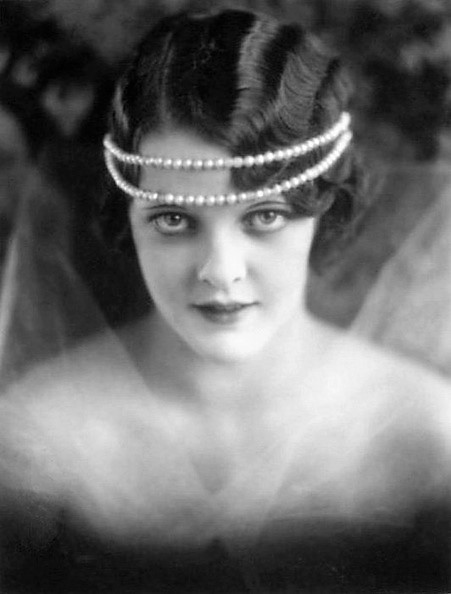
- Mehaffey about 1922
- Born: July 28, 1903
- Died: March 31, 1968 (aged 64)
- Occupations: Actress; showgirl
- Years active: 1922–1938
- Spouses: George Joseph Hausen (m. 1928; div. 1928) Ralph M. Like (m. 1932; div. 1938)

Blanche Mehaffey (July 28, 1903 – March 31, 1968) was an American showgirl and film actress.

== Early years ==
Mehaffey was born in Cincinnati, Ohio, the daughter of a dentist father and opera singer mother. She was graduate of the Cincinnati Conservatory of Music.

She began her professional career in 1921 when she was cast as a showgirl in Florenz Ziegfeld's Ziegfeld Midnight Frolic. In 1922 she won first prize in a contest a Cincinnati contest to pick the three most beautiful girls in Ohio. She was then cast in the Ziegfeld Follies of 1922.

== Film career ==
Mehaffey began her movie career in 1923 when she was cast in the George Jeske comedy, Fully Insured. She made over 60 films during a career that lasted until 1938. Mehaffey was among the WAMPAS "Baby Stars" of 1924 chosen by the Western Association of Motion Picture Advertisers.

She spent 1930 away from films studying voice and languages in New York City.

One critic considers Mehaffey's films to be "eminently forgettable [B movies]", although another cites A Woman of the World as one of a hundred "essential silent film comedies."

== Personal life ==
Mehaffey wed George Joseph Hausen in Los Angeles in January 1928 and obtained a divorce in April of the same year. She was married to film producer Ralph M. Like from 1932 to 1939. She later married James Collins, and died on March 31, 1968.

== Filmography ==
- It's a Boy (1923)
- The White Sheep (1924)
- Meet the Missus (1924)
- The Goofy Age (1924)
- The Battling Orioles (1924)
- Position Wanted (1924)
- Going to Congress (1924)
- April Fool (1924)
- Friend Husband (1924)
- Powder and Smoke (1924)
- Just a Minute (1924)
- One of the Family (1924)
- The Big Idea (1924)
- At First Sight (1924)
- A Woman of the World (1925)
- His People (1925)
- Cuckoo Love (1925)
- Tell It to a Policeman (1925)
- Hold My Baby (1925)
- A Sailor Papa (1925)
- The Haunted Honeymoon (1925)
- The Wages of Tin (1925)
- Take It from Me (1926)
- The Runaway Express (1926)
- The Texas Streak (1926)
- He Forgot to Remember (1926)
- The Old War-Horse (1926)
- Finnegan's Ball (1927)
- The Tired Business Man (1927)
- The Princess from Hoboken (1927)
- The Denver Dude (1927)
- The Silent Rider (1927)
- Marlie the Killer (1928)
- The Air Mail Pilot (1928)
- Smilin' Guns (1929)
- Mounted Fury (1931)
- Soul of the Slums (1931)
- Is There Justice? (1931)
- Dancing Dynamite (1931)
- Dugan of the Badlands (1931)
- The Sky Spider (1931)
- Riders of the North (1931)
- The Mystery Trooper (1931)
- White Renegade (1931)
- The Sunrise Trail (1931)
- Hypnotized (1932)
- Alias Mary Smith (1932)
- Dynamite Denny (1932)
- Passport to Paradise (1932)
- Sally of the Subway (1932)
- Border Guns (1934)
- The Silent Code (1935)
- Pirate Party on Catalina Isle (1935)
- The Cowboy and the Bandit (1935)
- The Outlaw Tamer (1935)
- North of Arizona (1935)
- The Sea Fiend (1936)
- Wildcat Saunders (1936)
- The Wages of Sin (1938)
- Held for Ransom (1938)
