= Marlie the Killer =

1928 film

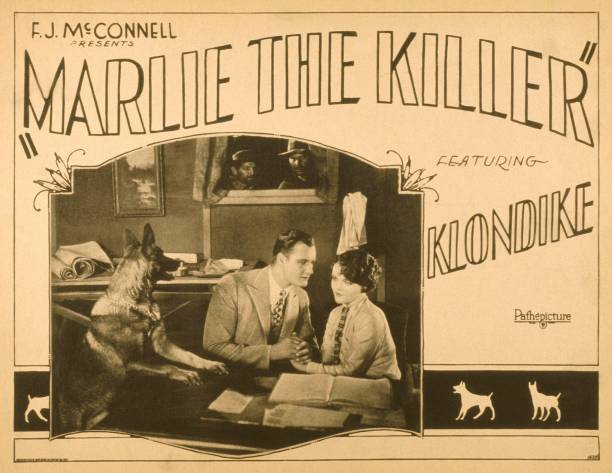
- Directed by: Noel M. Smith
- Written by: Hazel Christie MacDonald; George W. Pyper
- Produced by: Fred McConnell
- Starring: Francis X. Bushman Jr.; Joseph W. Girard; Blanche Mehaffey
- Cinematography: Harry Cooper
- Production company: Fred J. McConnell Productions
- Distributed by: Pathé Exchange
- Release date: March 4, 1928
- Running time: 50 minutes
- Country: United States
- Languages: Silent; English intertitles

Marlie the Killer is a 1928 American silent action film directed by Noel M. Smith and starring Francis X. Bushman Jr., Joseph W. Girard and Blanche Mehaffey. It was designed as a vehicle for Klondike the Dog, an imitator of Rin Tin Tin.

== Cast ==
- Klondike the Dog as Klondike
- Francis X. Bushman Jr. as Bob Cleveland
- Joseph W. Girard as John Cleveland
- Blanche Mehaffey as Marion Nichols
- Richard Alexander as Sam McKee
- Sheldon Lewis as Tom Arnold

== Bibliography ==
- Munden, Kenneth White. The American Film Institute Catalog of Motion Pictures Produced in the United States, Part 1. University of California Press, 1997.
