= Her Resale Value =

1933 film directed by B. Reeves Eason

- Directed by: B. Reeves Eason
- Written by: John T. Neville; Horace McCoy
- Produced by: Fanchon Royer; Ralph M. Like
- Starring: June Clyde; George J. Lewis; Noel Francis
- Cinematography: Ernest Miller
- Edited by: Jeanne Spencer
- Production company: Fanchon Royer Pictures
- Distributed by: Mayfair Pictures
- Release date: June 21, 1933
- Running time: 63 minutes
- Country: United States
- Language: English

Her Resale Value is a 1933 American pre-Code drama film directed by B. Reeves Eason and starring June Clyde, George J. Lewis and Noel Francis. The film's sets were designed by the art director Paul Palmentola.

== Plot ==
Bored of her life as a small town doctor's wife, a young woman heads to the city with ambitions of becoming a model. She takes a new lover and plans to divorce her husband, now a head of a hospital, so that she can remarry.

== Cast ==
- June Clyde as Mary Harris
- George J. Lewis as Dr. Ted Harris
- Noel Francis as Milly
- Ralf Harolde as Sidney Fletcher
- Gladys Hulette as Jane Martin
- Crauford Kent as Dick Stevens
- Richard Tucker as Dr. Lukas
- Franklin Parker as Truex

== Bibliography ==
- Michael R. Pitts. Poverty Row Studios, 1929–1940: An Illustrated History of 55 Independent Film Companies, with a Filmography for Each. McFarland & Company, 2005.
