= Midnight Morals =

1932 film

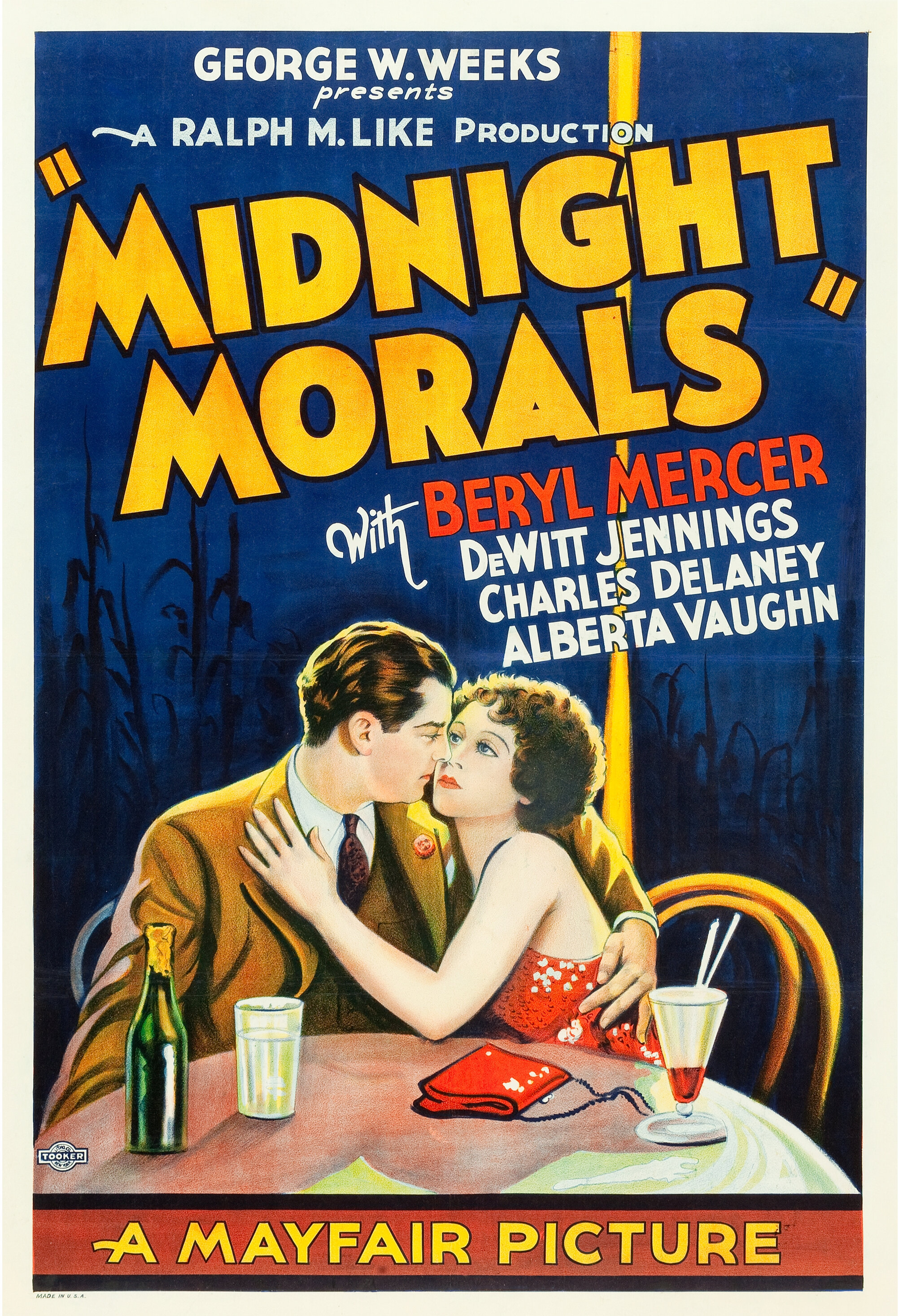
- Directed by: B. Reeves Eason; E. Mason Hopper
- Written by: Norman Houston
- Produced by: Ralph M. Like; George W. Weeks
- Starring: Alberta Vaughn; Rex Lease; Charles Delaney
- Cinematography: Jules Cronjager
- Edited by: Byron Robinson
- Production company: Ralph M. Like Productions
- Distributed by: Mayfair Pictures
- Release date: August 1, 1932
- Running time: 61 minutes
- Country: United States
- Language: English

Midnight Morals is a 1932 American pre-Code crime drama film directed by B. Reeves Eason, and E. Mason Hopper and starring Alberta Vaughn, Rex Lease and Charles Delaney. It was distributed by the independent Mayfair Pictures.

== Plot ==
A young police officer meets a taxi dancer at a nightclub, getting him embroiled with criminal Preen Lazetti, to the disgust of his own father a veteran cop.

== Cast ==
- Alberta Vaughn as Katy Dolan
- Rex Lease as Preen Lazetti
- Charles Delaney as Dave McKennan
- Beryl Mercer as Mother O'Brien, the Prison Matron
- DeWitt Jennings as Dan McKennan
- Gwen Lee as Dora Cobb

== Bibliography ==
- Fetrow, Alan G. . Sound films, 1927-1939: a United States Filmography. McFarland, 1992.
- Pitts, Michael R. Poverty Row Studios, 1929–1940: An Illustrated History of 55 Independent Film Companies, with a Filmography for Each. McFarland & Company, 2005.
