= Marjorie Beebe =

American actress (1908–1983)

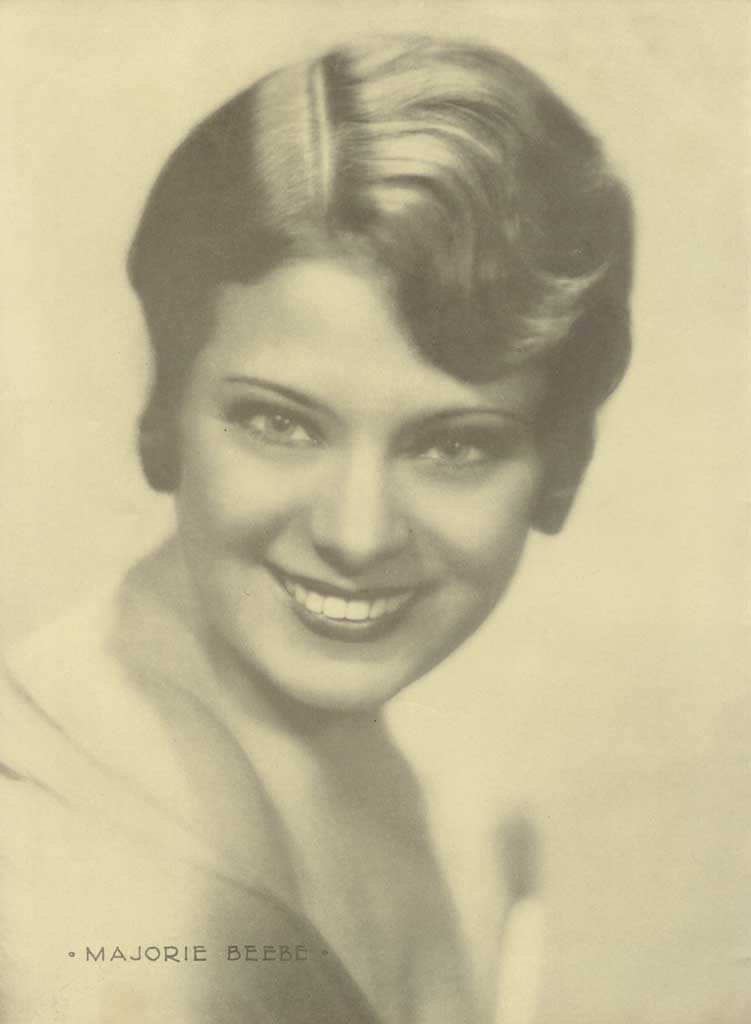
- From an Argentinean Magazine
- Born: Marjorie Eileen Beebe; October 9, 1908; Kansas City, Missouri, United States
- Died: May 9, 1983 (aged 74); Escondido, California, United States
- Occupation: Actress
- Years active: 1920 - 1939 (film)
- Spouse: Clinton E. Randall (1934 - 1935, annulled)

Marjorie Eileen Beebe (October 9, 1908 – May 9, 1983) was an American film actress.

== Early years ==
Beebe was born on October 9, 1909. She graduated from Hollywood High School.

== Career ==
Beebe tired of working as an assistant in a magician's show, so she went to Hollywood to become an actress. She was rejected by several casting directors before she found work for one day at FBO Pictures Corporation. Three months of additional searching resulted in a job at Universal Pictures, where she stayed nine months, appearing in minor roles. In 1927, she began longer employment at Fox Film. She was a star in Mack Sennett films.

== Personal life ==
Beebe married broker Clinton E. Randall in Yuma, Arizona, in May 1934; the marriage was annulled in Los Angeles on July 29, 1935, after Beebe told the judge that she had to sell her automobile for money to support Randall. She died on May 9, 1983.

== Partial filmography ==
- Hills of Peril (1927)
- Rich But Honest (1927)
- Very Confidential (1927)
- Ankles Preferred (1928)
- The Farmer's Daughter (1928)
- Homesick (1928)
- A Thief in the Dark (1928)
- Speakeasy (1929)
- Not Quite Decent (1929)
- Honeymoon Zeppelin (1930)
- Match Play (1930)
- Ghost Parade (1931, short)
- Hot News Margie (1931, short)
- Dragnet Patrol (1931)
- Rackety Rax (1932)
- Flames (1932)
- Murder at Dawn (1932)
- Docks of San Francisco (1932)
- Too Many Highballs (1933)
- One Year Later (1933)
- Lost Ranch (1937)
- The Fighting Deputy (1937)
- Hollywood Cavalcade (1939)

== Bibliography ==
- Drew, Bernard A. Motion Picture Series and Sequels: A Reference Guide. Routledge, 2013.
