= Sea Fury (1929 film) =

1929 film

- Directed by: George Melford
- Written by: Elmer Ellsworth; George Melford
- Produced by: Tom White
- Starring: Mildred Harris; George Regas; Frank Campeau
- Production company: Tom White Productions
- Distributed by: H.H. Rosenfield
- Release date: October 16, 1929
- Running time: 58 minutes
- Country: United States
- Language: English

Sea Fury is a 1929 adventure film directed by George Melford and starring Mildred Harris, George Regas and Frank Campeau. It was a transitional sound film, originally shot as a silent, the film had dialogue dubbed in before release in order to make it an "All-Talking" picture. The results were so abysmal that the film had a very limited release. The entire film takes place at sea on a ship travelling from Mexico to the United States whose crew mutinies against the captain. On board is a young woman, the only survivor of a shipwreck.

== Cast ==
- Jim Hallett as David Mills
- Mildred Harris as The Girl
- George Regas as Captain
- Frank Campeau as Boatswain
- George Godfrey as Cook
- Bernard Siegel as Carpenter
- Monty O'Grady as Cabin Boy

== Preservation ==
The film is now lost.

== See also ==
- List of early sound feature films (1926–1929)

== Bibliography ==
- Munden, Kenneth White. The American Film Institute Catalog of Motion Pictures Produced in the United States, Part 1. University of California Press, 1997.
