= Hell-Bent for Frisco =

1931 film

- Directed by: Stuart Paton
- Written by: Arthur Hoerl
- Produced by: George W. Weeks
- Starring: Charles Delaney; Vera Reynolds; Carroll Nye
- Cinematography: Jules Cronjager
- Edited by: Carl Himm
- Production company: George W. Weeks Productions
- Distributed by: Sono Art-World Wide Pictures
- Release date: July 10, 1931
- Running time: 65 minutes
- Country: United States
- Language: English

Hell-Bent for Frisco is a 1931 American pre-Code action film directed by Stuart Paton and starring Charles Delaney, Vera Reynolds and Carroll Nye.

== Plot ==
After his girlfriend's brother is murdered, a San Francisco newspapermen goes on the track of his killers.

== Cast ==
- Charles Delaney as Jimmy Gray
- Vera Reynolds as Ellen Garwood
- Carroll Nye as Lane Garwood
- Wesley Barry as The Newsboy
- William Desmond as The Editor
- Edmund Burns as Frank Kenton
- Reed Howes as Red
- Charles Craig as Dr. Clayton
- Richard Cramer as Nick
- George Regas as Tony
- Tom O'Brien as Fogarty

== Lost film status ==
As of 16 August 2006, The Image of the Journalist in Popular Culture, a project of the Norman Lear Center at the USC Annenberg School for Communication & Journalism has not found an existing copy of the film.

== Bibliography ==
- Darby, William. Masters of Lens and Light: A Checklist of Major Cinematographers and Their Feature Films. Scarecrow Press, 1991.
