= Mayfair Pictures =

American film production and distribution company

Mayfair Pictures was an American film production and distribution company active between 1931 and 1934 during the early sound era. It grew out of Action Pictures, another low-budget studio location on Poverty Row. It was established by producer Ralph M. Like and was located at the former Charles Ray Studios in Hollywood.

== Filmography ==
- Anybody's Blonde (1931)
- Chinatown After Dark (1931)
- Night Beat (1931)
- The Sky Spider (1931)
- Soul of the Slums (1931)
- Dragnet Patrol (1931)
- Behind Stone Walls (1932)
- Docks of San Francisco (1932)
- Love in High Gear (1932)
- The Monster Walks (1932)
- Hell's Headquarters (1932)
- Tangled Destinies (1932)
- Passport to Paradise (1932)
- The Widow in Scarlet (1932)
- Midnight Morals (1932)
- Temptation's Workshop (1932)
- Alias Mary Smith (1932)
- Her Mad Night (1932)
- Gorilla Ship (1932)
- Malay Nights (1932)
- No Living Witness (1932)
- The Midnight Warning (1932)
- Trapped in Tia Juana (1932)
- Dynamite Denny (1932)
- Behind Jury Doors (1932)
- The Heart Punch (1932)
- Sister to Judas (1932)
- Secret Sinners (1933)
- Riot Squad (1933)
- Her Forgotten Past (1933)
- Dance Hall Hostess (1933)
- Her Resale Value (1933)
- Justice Takes a Holiday (1933)
- Alimony Madness (1933)
- Mystery at Monte Carlo (1933)
- What's Your Racket? (1934)
- Badge of Honor (1934)
- The Fighting Rookie (1934)
- The Oil Raider (1934)
- Calling All Cars (1935, released by another company)
- Get That Man (1935, released by another company}

== Bibliography ==
- Pitts, Michael R. Poverty Row Studios, 1929–1940: An Illustrated History of 55 Independent Film Companies, with a Filmography for Each. McFarland & Company, 2005.
- Slide, Anthony. The New Historical Dictionary of the American Film Industry. Routledge, 2014.
