= Jules Cronjager =

German cinematographer

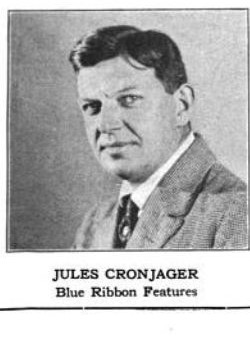
- 1917 portrait
- Born: August 23, 1871; Clausthal, German Empire
- Died: December 28, 1934 (aged 63); Culver City, California, United States
- Occupation: Cinematographer
- Years active: 1916-1933 (film)

Jules Cronjager (1871–1934) was a German-born American cinematographer active in the silent and early sound eras, as was his brother, Henry Cronjager. Towards the end of his career he worked mainly for Poverty Row studios such as Mayfair Pictures. He was also the uncle of cinematographers Edward Cronjager and Henry Cronjager Jr.

== Selected filmography ==
- The Bottom of the Well (1917)
- A Nymph of the Foothills (1918)
- The Mating (1918)
- Youthful Folly (1920)
- The Shadow of Rosalie Byrnes (1920)
- The Greatest Love (1920)
- Handcuffs or Kisses (1921)
- A Man of Stone (1921)
- The Last Door (1921)
- Worlds Apart (1921)
- Is Life Worth Living? (1921)
- Chivalrous Charley (1921)
- Clay Dollars (1921)
- Gilded Lies (1921)
- The Prophet's Paradise (1922)
- Shadows of the Sea (1922)
- One Week of Love (1922)
- Reported Missing (1922)
- Reckless Youth (1922)
- Love Is an Awful Thing (1922)
- Evidence (1922)
- The Dancer of the Nile (1923)
- Modern Matrimony (1923)
- The Storm Daughter (1924)
- The Isle of Retribution (1926)
- Collegiate (1926)
- Home Struck (1927)
- Ladies Beware (1927)
- Old Age Handicap (1928)
- The Kid from Arizona (1931)
- Wild West Whoopee (1931)
- The Sheriff's Secret (1931)
- Anybody's Blonde (1931)
- Dragnet Patrol (1931)
- Soul of the Slums (1931)
- Chinatown After Dark (1931)
- Hell-Bent for Frisco (1931)
- Her Mad Night (1932)
- Sister to Judas (1932)
- Dynamite Denny (1932)
- Malay Nights (1932)
- Midnight Morals (1932)
- Gorilla Ship (1932)
- Alias Mary Smith (1932)
- No Living Witness (1932)
- Tangled Destinies (1932)
- Behind Stone Walls (1932)
- Love in High Gear (1932)
- Midnight Warning (1932)
- The Monster Walks (1932)
- Dance Hall Hostess (1933)
- Under Secret Orders (1933)
- Her Splendid Folly (1933)
- Easy Millions (1933)

== Bibliography ==
- Michael R. Pitts. Poverty Row Studios, 1929–1940: An Illustrated History of 55 Independent Film Companies, with a Filmography for Each. McFarland & Company, 2005.
