= Bob Steele filmography =

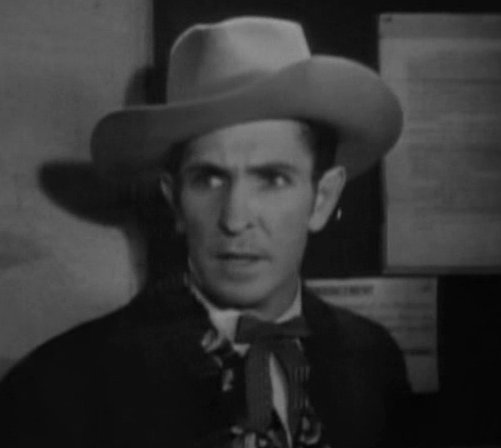
Bob Steele in The Carson City Kid (1940)

American actor Bob Steele (born Robert Adrian Bradbury. January 23, 1907 – December 21, 1988), and his twin brother Bill were the sons of film director Robert N. Bradbury. The twins began their acting career in the silent film The Adventures of Bill and Bob, directed by their father, and continued in a series of Bradbury Sr.'s film shorts. Bill later pursued a career in medicine. Bob continued to act under the name Robert Bradbury Jr. until he appeared in The Mojave Kid, when he was billed as Bob Steele. During his career of more than 400 films and television shows between 1920 and 1974, he was known primarily for his work in Westerns. Steele appeared as the recurring character of Tucson Smith in 20 of the Three Mesquiteers serials produced by Republic Pictures. He became familiar to America's television audiences for his recurring role as Trooper Duffy in the comedy series F Troop.

== Filmography ==
Feature length and short subject films of Bob Steele
Title	Year	Role	Notes	Ref(s)
Human Desire	1919	Jasper Norton	Silent film Louis B. Mayer Pictures	
The Adventures of Bill and Bob	1920	Bob	as Bob Bradbury Jr., serial of 16 shorts	
Just Plain Folks	1925		as Bob Bradbury	
Daniel Boone Thru the Wilderness	1926	Jim Bryan	as Bob Bradbury Jr.	
Davy Crockett at the Fall of the Alamo	1926	"Pinky" Smith	as Bob Bradbury Jr, Sunset Productions	
The College Boob	1926	Shorty Buzelle	as Bob Bradbury Jr. Harry Garson Productions	
Sitting Bull at the Spirit Lake Massacre	1927	Bob Keefe	as Bob Bradbury Jr. Sunset Productions	
The Mojave Kid	1927	Bob Saunders	Robertson-Cole Pictures Corporation	
The Bandit's Son	1927	Bob McCall	F.B.O. Productions, Inc.	
Driftin' Sands	1928	Driftin' Sands	F.B.O. Productions, Inc.	
Sliding Home	1928	Student	Short, (credited as Robert Bradbury Jr.)	
The Ridin' Renegade	1928	Bob Taylor	F.B.O. Productions, Inc.	
Breed of the Sunsets	1928	Jim Collins	F.B.O. Productions, Inc.	
Man in the Rough	1928	Bruce Sherwood	F.B.O. Productions, Inc.	
Trail of Courage	1928	Tex Reeves	F.B.O. Productions, Inc.	
Captain Careless	1928	Bob Gordon	F.B.O. Productions, Inc.	
Lightning Speed	1928	Jack	F.B.O. Productions, Inc.	
Headin' for Danger	1928	Jimmy Marshall	F.B.O. Productions, Inc.	
Come and Get It!	1929	Breezy Smith	RKO Pictures	
The Amazing Vagabond	1929	Jimmy Hobbs	F.B.O. Productions, Inc.	
Laughing at Death	1929	Bob Thornton	F.B.O. Productions, Inc.	
The Cowboy and the Outlaw	1929	George Hardcastle	Big Productions Film Corp.	
The Invaders	1929		Big Productions Film Corp.	
A Texas Cowboy	1929	Dick Carlysle	Big Productions Film Corp.	
Breezy Bill	1930	Breezy Bill	Big Productions Film Corp.	
Hunted Men	1930	Dick Stockdale	Big Productions Film Corp.	
The Man from Nowhere	1930	Terry Norton	Big Productions Film Corp.	
Western Honor	1930	Bob	Big Productions Film Corporation	
Near the Rainbow's End	1930	Jim Bledsoe	Trem Carr Productions	
The Oklahoma Sheriff	1930		Big Productions Film Corp.	
The Oklahoma Cyclone	1930	Oklahoma Cyclone	Trem Carr Productions	
The Land of Missing Men	1930	Steve O'Neil	Trem Carr Productions	
Headin' North	1930	Jim Curtis	Trem Carr Productions	
Sunrise Trail	1931	Texas, a.k.a. Tex	Tiffany Pictures	
The Ridin' Fool	1931	Steve Kendall	Tiffany Pictures	
Near the Trail's End	1931	Marshal Johnny Day	Tiffany Pictures	
The Nevada Buckaroo	1931	Buck Hurley, known as The Nevada Kid	Tiffany Pictures	
South of Santa Fe	1932	Tom	Trem Carr Pictures, Ltd	
Law of the West	1932	Bob Carruthers, alias Bob Morgan	Trem Carr Pictures, Ltd	
Riders of the Desert	1932	Bob Houston	Trem Carr Pictures, Ltd	
The Man from Hell's Edges	1932	Bob Williams a.k.a. "Flash" Manning	Trem Carr Pictures, Ltd	
Son of Oklahoma	1932	Dan Clayton	Trem Carr Pictures, Ltd	
Hidden Valley	1932	Bob Harding	Monogram Pictures	
Texas Buddies	1932	Ted Garner	Trem Carr Pictures, Ltd	
Young Blood	1932	Nick a.k.a. The Kid a.k.a. Lola	Trem Carr Pictures, Ltd	
The Fighting Champ	1932	"Brick" Loring	Monogram Pictures	
Breed of the Border	1933	"Speed" Brent	Monogram Pictures	
Trailing North	1933	Lee Evans	Monogram Pictures	
The Gallant Fool	1933	Kit Denton	Monogram Pictures	
Galloping Romeo	1933	Bob Rivers	Monogram Pictures	
Ranger's Code	1933	Bob Baxter	Monogram Pictures	
The Mystery Squadron	1933	Fred Cromwell	Mascot Pictures	
A Demon for Trouble	1934	Bob Worth	Supreme Pictures Corp.	
The Brand of Hate	1934	Rod Camp	Supreme Pictures Corp.	
Western Justice	1935	Jim, alias Ace	Supreme Pictures Corp.	
Kid Courageous	1935	Bob Bannister	Supreme Pictures Corp.	
Big Calibre	1935	Bob Neal	Supreme Pictures Corp.	
Smokey Smith	1935	Smokey Smith	Supreme Pictures Corp.	
Tombstone Terror	1935	Jimmy Dixon / Duke Dixon	Supreme Pictures Corp.	
No Man's Range	1935	Jim Hale	Supreme Pictures Corp.	
Powdersmoke Range	1935	Guadalupe Kid	RKO Pictures	
The Rider of the Law	1935	Bob Marlow	Supreme Pictures Corp.	
Alias John Law	1935	Everett Tarkington "John" Clark	Supreme Pictures Corp.	
Trail of Terror	1935	Jim Wilson, posing as Spike Manning	Supreme Pictures Corp.	
The Kid Ranger	1935	Ray Burton	Supreme Pictures Corp.	
Sundown Saunders	1936	Jim Sundown Saunders	Supreme Pictures Corp.	
Last of the Warrens	1936	Ted Warren	Supreme Pictures Corp.	
The Law Rides	1936	Bruce Conway	Reliable Pictures	
Brand of the Outlaws	1936		Supreme Pictures Corp.	
Cavalry	1936	Captain Ted Thorne	Supreme Pictures Corp.	
The Gun Ranger	1936	Dan Larson	Supreme Pictures Corp.	
Lightnin' Crandall	1937	Bob Crandall, a.k.a. Lightnin' Crandall	Supreme Pictures Corp.	
The Trusted Outlaw	1937	Dan Ward	Supreme Pictures Corp.	
Gun Lords of Stirrup Basin	1937	Dan Stockton	Supreme Pictures Corp.	
Border Phantom	1937	Larry O'Day	Republic Pictures Corp.	
Doomed at Sundown	1937	Dave Austin	Supreme Pictures Corp.	
The Red Rope	1937	Tom Shaw	Supreme Pictures Corp.	
Ridin' the Lone Trail	1937	Bob McArthur	Supreme Pictures Corp.	
Arizona Gunfighter	1937	Colt Ferron ("The Arizona Gunfighter")	Supreme Pictures Corp.	
The Colorado Kid	1937	Colorado Kid	Supreme Pictures Corp.	
Paroled - To Die	1938	Doug Redfern	Supreme Pictures Corp.	
Thunder in the Desert	1938	Bob Radford	Supreme Pictures Corp.	
The Feud Maker	1938	Texas Ryan a.k.a. Wind River Kid	Republic Pictures	
Desert Patrol	1938	Dave Austin	Supreme Pictures Corp.	
Durango Valley Raiders	1938	Keene Cordner	Supreme Pictures Corp.	
Feud of the Range	1939	Bob Gray	Metropolitan Pictures Corp.	
Smoky Trails	1939	Bob Archer	Metropolitan Pictures Corp.	
Mesquite Buckaroo	1939	Bob Allen	Metropolitan Pictures Corp.	
Riders of the Sage	1939	Bob Burke	Metropolitan Pictures Corp.	
The Pal from Texas	1939	Bob Barton	Metropolitan Pictures Corp.	
El Diablo Rides	1939	Bob	Metropolitan Pictures Corp.	
Of Mice and Men	1939	Curley Jackson	Hal Roach Studios	
Wild Horse Valley	1940	Bob Evans	Metropolitan Pictures Corp.	
Pinto Canyon	1940	Sheriff Bob Hall	Metropolitan Pictures	
The Carson City Kid	1940	Lee Jessup / Morgan Reynolds	Republic Pictures Corp.	
Billy the Kid Outlawed	1940	Billy the Kid	Sigmund Neufeld Productions	
Under Texas Skies	1940	Tucson Smith	The Three Mesquiteers series Republic Pictures Corp.	
Billy the Kid in Texas	1940	Billy the Kid	Producers Releasing Corporation	
The Trail Blazers	1940	Tucson Smith	The Three Mesquiteers series Republic Pictures Corp.	
Lone Star Raiders	1940	Tucson Smith	The Three Mesquiteers series Republic Pictures Corp.	
Billy the Kid's Gun Justice	1940	Billy the Kid	Sigmund Neufeld Productions	
Billy the Kid's Range War	1941	Billy the Kid	a.k.a. Texas Trouble; Producers Releasing Corporation	
Prairie Pioneers	1941	Tucson Smith	The Three Mesquiteers series Republic Pictures Corp.	
The Great Train Robbery	1941	Tom Logan	Republic Pictures Corp.	
Pals of the Pecos	1941	Tucson Smith	The Three Mesquiteers series Republic Pictures Corp.	
Billy the Kid's Fighting Pals	1941	Billy the Kid	Producers Releasing Corporation	
Saddlemates	1941	Tucson Smith	The Three Mesquiteers series Republic Pictures Corp.	
Gangs of Sonora	1941	Tucson Smith	The Three Mesquiteers series Republic Pictures Corp.	
Billy the Kid in Santa Fe	1941	Billy the Kid	Producers Releasing Corporation	
Outlaws of Cherokee Trail	1941	Tucson Smith	The Three Mesquiteers series Republic Pictures Corp.	
Gauchos of El Dorado	1941	Tucson Smith	The Three Mesquiteers series Republic Pictures Corp.	
West of Cimarron	1941	Tucson Smith	The Three Mesquiteers series Republic Pictures Corp.	
Code of the Outlaw	1942	Tucson Smith	The Three Mesquiteers series Republic Pictures Corp.	
Raiders of the Range	1942	Tucson Smith	The Three Mesquiteers series Republic Pictures Corp.	
Westward Ho	1942	Tucson Smith	The Three Mesquiteers series Republic Pictures Corp.	
The Phantom Plainsmen	1942	Tucson Smith	The Three Mesquiteers series Republic Pictures Corp.	
Shadows on the Sage	1942	Tucson Smith	The Three Mesquiteers series Republic Pictures Corp.	
Valley of Hunted Men	1942	Tucson Smith	The Three Mesquiteers series Republic Pictures Corp.	
Thundering Trails	1943	Tucson Smith	The Three Mesquiteers series Republic Pictures Corp.	
The Blocked Trail	1943	Tucson Smith	The Three Mesquiteers series Republic Pictures Corp.	
Santa Fe Scouts	1943	Tucson Smith	The Three Mesquiteers series Republic Pictures Corp.	
Riders of the Rio Grande	1943	Tucson Smith	The Three Mesquiteers series Republic Pictures Corp.	
Revenge of the Zombies	1943	United States Agent	Monogram Pictures	
Arizona Whirlwind	1944	Himself	Monogram Pictures	
Death Valley Rangers	1943	Himself	Monogram Pictures	
Outlaw Trail	1944	Himself	Monogram Pictures	
Westward Bound	1944	Himself	Monogram Pictures	
Sonora Stagecoach	1944	Himself	Monogram Pictures	
Marked Trails	1944	Bob Stevens aka Cheyenne	Monogram Pictures	
The Utah Kid	1944	Bob Roberts	Monogram Pictures	
Trigger Law	1944	Himself	Monogram Pictures	
Wildfire	1945	Happy Hay	Action Pictures	
Navajo Kid	1945	Tom Kirk a.k.a. The Navajo Kid	Alexander-Stern Productions	
Northwest Trail	1945	Trooper Matt O'Brien	Action Pictures	
Six Gun Man	1946	Bob "Stormy" Storm	Producers Releasing Corporation	
Ambush Trail	1946	Curley Thompson	Producers Releasing Corporation	
Sheriff of Redwood Valley	1946	The Reno Kid	Republic Pictures Corp.	
Thunder Town	1946	Jim Brandon	Producers Releasing Corporation	
The Big Sleep	1946	Lash Canino	Warner Bros. Preserved at the UCLA Film & Television Archive	
Rio Grande Raiders	1946	Jeff Carson	Republic Pictures Corp.	
Twilight on the Rio Grande	1947	Dusty Morgan	Republic Pictures Corp.	
Cheyenne	1947	Bucky	Warner Bros.	
Exposed	1947	Chicago	Republic Pictures Corp.	
Killer McCoy	1947	Sailor Graves	Metro-Goldwyn-Mayer	
Bandits of Dark Canyon	1947	Ed Archer	Republic Pictures Corp.	
South of St. Louis	1949	Slim Hansen	United States Pictures	
The Savage Horde	1950	Dancer (Proctor's hired gunman)	Republic Pictures Corp.	
The Enforcer	1951	Herman	United States Pictures	
Silver Canyon	1951	Walt Middler	Gene Autry Productions	
Fort Worth	1951	Shorty	Warner Bros.	
Cattle Drive	1951	Charlie Morgan a.k.a. Careless	Universal Pictures	
Rose of Cimarron	1952	Rio	Alco Pictures Corp.	
Bugles in the Afternoon	1952	Horseman (uncredited)	Cagney Productions, Inc.	
The Lion and the Horse	1952	Matt Jennings	Warner Bros.	
San Antone	1953	Bob Coolidge	Republic Pictures Corp.	
Savage Frontier	1953	Sam Webb	Republic Pictures Corp.	
Column South	1953	Sgt. "Mac" McAfee	Universal Pictures	
Island in the Sky	1953	Wilson, Moon's radioman	Wayne-Fellows Productions, Inc.	
Drums Across the River	1954	Billy Costa	Universal Pictures	
The Outcast	1954	Dude Rankin	Republic Pictures Corp.	
Last of the Desperados	1955	Charlie Bowdre	Sigmund Neufeld Productions, Inc.	
The Fighting Chance	1955	Curly, a Jockey	Republic Pictures Corp.	
The Spoilers	1955	Miner	Universal Pictures	
The Steel Jungle	1956	Dan Bucci	Warner Bros.	
Pardners	1956	Shorty	Paramount Pictures	
Duel at Apache Wells	1957	Joe Dunn	Republic Pictures Corp.	
Gun for a Coward	1957	Durkee	Universal Pictures	
Band of Angels	1957	Union Private (uncredited)	Warner Bros.	
The Parson and the Outlaw	1957	Ace Jardine	R. G. Productions	
Decision at Sundown	1957	Irv, Deputy Sheriff (uncredited)	Producer-Actor Corporation; Scott-Brown Productions	
Giant from the Unknown	1958	Sheriff Parker	Astor Pictures	
The Bonnie Parker Story	1958	Armored Truck Guard (uncredited)	American International Pictures	
Once Upon a Horse...	1958	Himself	Universal Pictures	
Ride a Crooked Trail	1958	Jud Blunt, Bearded man (uncredited) being questioned by Judge Kyle	Universal Pictures	
No Name on the Bullet	1959	Poker Player (uncredited)	Universal Pictures	
Rio Bravo	1959	Matt Harris, Burdette Gunman	Warner Bros.	
Pork Chop Hill	1959	Col. Kern	Sy Bartlett	
The Atomic Submarine	1959	Chief Petty Officer "Grif" Griffin	Gorham Productions, Inc	
Hell Bent for Leather	1960	Jared	Universal Pictures	
The Comancheros	1961	Pa Schofield (uncredited)	20th Century Fox	
Six Black Horses	1962	Puncher	Universal Pictures	
The Wild Westerners	1962	Deputy Marshal Casey Banner	Four Leaf Productions	
The Longest Day	1962	Paratrooper (uncredited)	20th Century-Fox	
Showdown	1963	Poker Player (uncredited)	Universal Pictures	
Wall of Noise	1963	Trainer (uncredited)	Warner Bros.	
McLintock!	1963	Train Engineer	Batjac Productions/United Artists	
4 for Texas	1963	Bank board member	Warner Bros.	
Bullet for a Badman	1964	Sheriff (uncredited)	Universal Pictures	
Taggart	1964	Earl, Cook (uncredited)	Universal Pictures	
Shenandoah	1965	Union Train Guard (uncredited)	Universal Pictures	
Requiem for a Gunfighter	1965	Max Smith	Premiere Productions	
Town Tamer	1965	Ken, Vigilante	A.C. Lyles Productions	
The Bounty Killer	1965	Red, Henchman	Embassy Pictures	
Hang 'Em High	1968	Jenkins, Cooper Hanging Party	United Artists	
The Great Bank Robbery	1969	Duffy (bank guard no. 1)	Warner Bros.	
Rio Lobo	1970	Rio Lobo Deputy	Batjac Productions	
Skin Game	1971	Uncredited	Warner Bros.	
Something Big	1971	Teamster no. 3	National General Pictures	
Charley Varrick	1973	Brindle	Universal Pictures	
Nightmare Honeymoon	1974	Charlie	Metro-Goldwyn-Mayer	

== Television ==
Television credits of Bob Steele
Program	Air date	Role	Notes	Ref(s)
Screen Directors Playhouse	1955	Deputy Dodd	Arroyo, 26 October 1955	
F Troop	1965–1967	Trooper Duffy	TV series	
Doc	1969	Toby	TV movie	

== Bibliography ==
- Boggs, Johnny D. (2013). Billy the Kid on Film. McFarland & Company, Inc. pp. 47, 60. ISBN 9780786465552.
- Brooks, Tim; Marsh, Earle F. (2009). The Complete Directory to Prime Time Network and Cable TV Shows, 1946–Present. Ballantine Books. ISBN 978-0-345-45542-0.
- Fagen, Herb (2003). The Encyclopedia of Westerns. New York: Facts On File. ISBN 978-0816044566.
- Graham, Don (1989). No Name on the Bullet. New York, NY: Viking. ISBN 978-0-670-81511-1.
- Katchmer, George A. (2009). A Biographical Dictionary of Silent Film Western Actors and Actresses. McFarland. ISBN 978-0-7864-4693-3.
- Pitts, Michael R. (2012). Western Movies: A Guide to 5,105 Feature Films. McFarland & Company, Inc. ISBN 978-1-4766-0090-1.
- Slatta, Richard W. (1994). The Cowboy Encyclopedia. ABC-CLIO. p. 26. ISBN 9780874367386.
- Terrace, Vincent (2010). Encyclopedia of Television Shows, 1925 through 2010. McFarland. ISBN 978-0-7864-6477-7.
