= Boothill Brigade =

1937 film by Sam Newfield

- Film poster
- Directed by: Sam Newfield
- Screenplay by: George H. Plympton
- Story by: Harry F. Olmsted
- Produced by: A. W. Hackel
- Starring: Johnny Mack Brown; Claire Rochelle; Dick Curtis; Horace Murphy; Frank LaRue; Ed Cassidy
- Cinematography: Bert Longenecker
- Edited by: S. Roy Luby
- Production company: Supreme Pictures
- Distributed by: Republic Pictures
- Release date: August 2, 1937
- Running time: 56 minutes
- Country: United States
- Language: English

Boothill Brigade is a 1937 American Western film directed by Sam Newfield and written by George H. Plympton. The film stars Johnny Mack Brown, Claire Rochelle, Dick Curtis, Horace Murphy, Frank LaRue and Ed Cassidy. The film was released on August 2, 1937, by Republic Pictures.

== Plot ==
Lon discovers that his best girl's rancher father has bought up the whole valley and plans on evicting all the previous residents who believe they have squatter's rights to remain. Lon is desperate to keep the squatters from resorting to violence to sort things out.

== Cast ==
- Johnny Mack Brown as Lon Cardigan
- Claire Rochelle as Bobby Reynolds
- Dick Curtis as Bull Berke
- Horace Murphy as Calico Haynes
- Frank LaRue as Jeff Reynolds
- Ed Cassidy as John Porter
- Bobby Nelson as Tug Murdock
- Frank Ball as Murdock
- Steve Clark as Rancher Holbrook
- Frank Ellis as Rancher Brown
