= Margaret Mann =

Scottish-American actress (1868–1941)

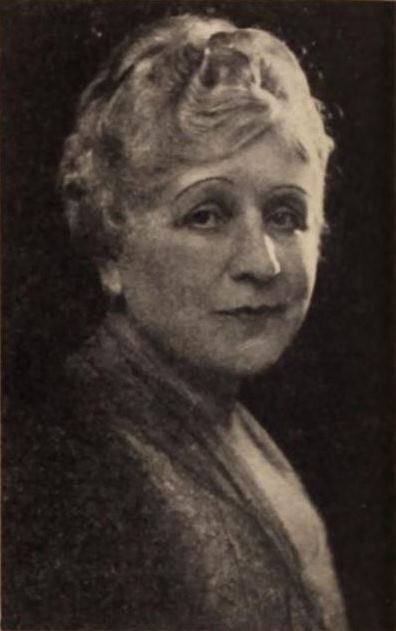
- Mann in 1920
- Born: 4 April 1868; Aberdeen, Scotland
- Died: 4 February 1941 (aged 72); Los Angeles, California, United States
- Occupation: Actress
- Years active: 1918–1941
- Spouse: James F. Smythe

Margaret Mann (4 April 1868 – 4 February 1941, in Los Angeles, California), was a Scottish-American actress.

== Early years ==
Mann was born in Aberdeen, Scotland, one of 10 children in her family. The family moved to South Africa when she was 12 years old. She worked at a variety of jobs, including being a dressmaker. Her first involvement with acting came when she was 50 years old, portraying Martha Washington in a pageant.

== Career ==
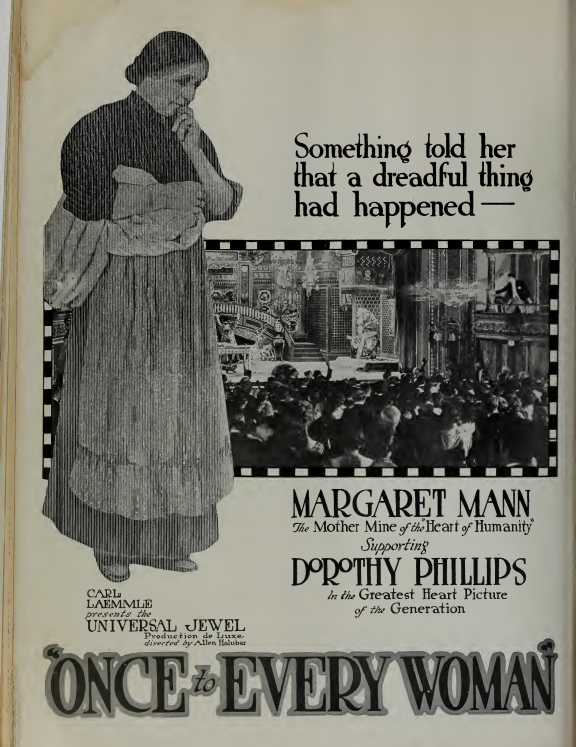
Mann in an ad for Once to Every Woman (1920)

Mann worked as an extra in films for 10 years, primarily at Universal and Triangle studios.

She starred in a number of major silent films such as Black Beauty in 1921 and played the lead role in John Ford's 1928 drama Four Sons, one of John Wayne's first films. She often played kind-hearted or suffering motherly roles. With the advent of sound films her roles got notably smaller and she was often uncredited. She portrayed the kindly grandmother Mrs. Mack in two Our Gang comedies in 1931. She also played bit parts in movies like Frankenstein, You Can't Take It With You, Gone with the Wind and Mr. Smith Goes to Washington (1939). Her last of over 80 movies was The Remarkable Andrew (1942), released one year after her death.

== Personal life ==
Mann's husband was an invalid, and her earnings from working in films helped to cover the family's expenses. He was an accountant, and they met and married in South Africa. Mann died of cancer in 1941, aged 72. Not much about her private life is known, although a press release of 1928 said that Mann lived through many tragedies and hardships in her life. Her spouse was James F. Smythe.

== Selected filmography ==
- The Skylight Room (1917) - Miss Longnecker
- The Heart of Humanity (1918) - Widow Patricia
- The Right to Happiness (1919) - Mother Hardy
- The Red Lane (1920) - Minor Role
- Once to Every Woman (1920) - Mother Meredith
- Black Beauty (1921) - Mrs. Blomefield
- Man, Woman & Marriage (1921) - The Mother
- The Smart Sex (1921) - Mrs. Haskins
- Desert Blossoms (1921) - Mrs. Thornton
- The Millionaire (1921) - Grandmother
- The New Disciple (1921) - Marion Fanning
- The Call of Home (1922) - Gerry's Mother
- Don't Write Letters (1922) - Aunt Jane
- Love in the Dark (1922) - Mrs. Horton
- Officer 444 (1926) - Senior Nurse
- The Scarlet Letter (1926) - Townswoman (uncredited)
- Upstream (1927) - Theatre Audience Spectator (uncredited)
- Annie Laurie (1927) - Second Midwife (uncredited)
- Four Sons (1928) - Mother Bernle
- The Wind (1928) - Townswoman at Shindig (uncredited)
- The River (1928) - Widow Thompson
- Disraeli (1929) - Queen Victoria (uncredited)
- Romance (1930) - Opera Audience Member (uncredited)
- Men of the North (1930) - Mother Macheney (uncredited)
- Helping Grandma (1931, Short) - Mrs. Margaret Mack (storekeeper)
- Born to Love (1931) - White Haired Mother at Train Station (uncredited)
- Fly My Kite (1931, Short) - Margaret 'Grandma' Mann
- Five and Ten (1931) - Weeping Woman (uncredited)
- Broadminded (1931) - Huntington Hotel Guest (uncredited)
- The Brat (1931) - Housekeeper
- Expensive Women (1931) - Flower Seller (uncredited)
- Bad Company (1931) - Kingston Hotel Resident (uncredited)
- Frankenstein (1931) - Mourner (uncredited)
- West of Broadway (1931) - Justice of Peace's Wife (uncredited)
- Husband's Holiday (1931) - The Cook (uncredited)
- Secret Menace (1931) - Mrs. Jenkins
- Forbidden (1932) - Hospital Visitor (uncredited)
- Hotel Continental (1932) - Hotel Guest (uncredited)
- Stranger in Town (1932) - Mrs. Robinson (uncredited)
- If I Had a Million (1932) - Idylwood Resident (uncredited)
- Uptown New York (1932) - Elderly Woman (uncredited)
- Bachelor Mother (1932) - Mrs. Price
- Rasputin and the Empress (1932) - One of the Czarevetch's Nurse (uncredited)
- The Mysterious Rider (1933) - Mrs. Morgan (uncredited)
- Mystery of the Wax Museum (1933) - Wax Figure of Queen Victoria (uncredited)
- Pilgrimage (1933) - Mrs. Quincannon (uncredited)
- Torch Singer (1933) - Miss Thomas, Little Sally's Nanny (uncredited)
- Fugitive Lovers (1934) - Blind Man's Wife (uncredited)
- Beloved (1934) - Countess von Brandenburg
- Guilty Parents (1934) - Juror (uncredited)
- I Hate Women (1934) - Ma
- The World Moves On (1934) - Housekeeper (uncredited)
- One More River (1934) - Old Lady at Grave (uncredited)
- Pursued (1934) - Tourist (uncredited)
- Charlie Chan in London (1934) - Housemaid (uncredited)
- Judge Priest (1934) - Governess (uncredited)
- Love Time (1934) - Housemaid (uncredited)
- The Painted Veil (1934) - Mother Superior (uncredited)
- Little Men (1934) - The Nurse (uncredited)
- The Gay Bride (1934) - $100 Recipient (uncredited)
- The Man Who Reclaimed His Head (1934) - Granny (uncredited)
- Life Returns (1935) - Flower Vendor (uncredited)
- Kentucky Blue Streak (1935) - Mrs. Martha Bradley
- The Murder Man (1935) - Investor (uncredited)
- Bonnie Scotland (1935) - Housekeeper (uncredited)
- The Bohemian Girl (1936) - Arnheim's Mother (uncredited)
- Song and Dance Man (1936) - Old Theatrical Woman (uncredited)
- The Country Doctor (1936) - Townswoman (uncredited)
- Florida Special (1936) - Old Lady (uncredited)
- The Law Rides (1936) - Mrs. Lewis
- The Phantom Rider (1936, Serial) - Homesteader's Wife (uncredited)
- Hollywood Boulevard (1936) - Old Woman in Casting Office (uncredited)
- Undercover Man (1936) - Mrs. Grady (uncredited)
- Theodora Goes Wild (1936) - Grandma - Townswoman at Train Station (uncredited)
- Pennies from Heaven (1936) - White-Haired Woman (uncredited)
- Conflict (1936) - Ma Blake
- Let Them Live (1937) - (uncredited)
- Gun Lords of Stirrup Basin (1937) - Aunt Hattie (uncredited)
- You Can't Take It with You (1938) - Neighbor (uncredited)
- Federal Man-Hunt (1938) - Mrs. Ganter
- Charlie Chan at Treasure Island (1939) - Airplane Passenger (uncredited)
- Mr. Smith Goes to Washington (1939) - Nun with Cheering Orphan Boys (uncredited)
- Gone with the Wind (1939) - Woman Writing Letter at Atlanta Church Hospital (uncredited)
- The Remarkable Andrew (1942) - (uncredited) (final film role)
