= Branded a Coward =

1935 film

- Theatrical poster
- Directed by: Sam Newfield
- Written by: Richard Martinsen (story); Earle Snell
- Produced by: A.W. Hackel (producer) (uncredited)
- Starring: See below
- Cinematography: William Nobles
- Edited by: Earl Turner
- Distributed by: Supreme Pictures
- Release date: 1935
- Running time: 58 minutes
- Country: United States
- Language: English

Branded a Coward is a 1935 American Western film directed by Sam Newfield. it was the first of Johnny Mack Brown's Westerns made for producer A.W. Hackel's Supreme Picetures.

== Cast ==
- Johnny Mack Brown as Johnny Hume
- Billie Seward as Ethel Carson
- Syd Saylor as Oscar
- Lloyd Ingraham as Joe Carson
- Lee Shumway as Tom Hume
- Roger Williams as Henchman Tex
- Frank McCarroll as Henchman Dick
- Yakima Canutt as 'The Cat' (original)
- Mickey Rentschler as Young Johnny Hume
- Rex Downing as Young Billy Hume
