= Guns in the Dark =

1937 film by Sam Newfield

- Directed by: Sam Newfield
- Screenplay by: Charles F. Royal
- Story by: E.B. Mann
- Produced by: A. W. Hackel
- Starring: Johnny Mack Brown; Claire Rochelle; Syd Saylor; Ted Adams; Dick Curtis; Steve Clark
- Cinematography: Bert Longenecker
- Edited by: S. Roy Luby
- Production company: Supreme Pictures Corporation
- Distributed by: Republic Pictures
- Release date: May 13, 1937
- Running time: 56 minutes
- Country: United States
- Language: English

Guns in the Dark is a 1937 American Western film directed by Sam Newfield and written by Charles F. Royal. The film stars Johnny Mack Brown, Claire Rochelle, Syd Saylor, Ted Adams, Dick Curtis, and Steve Clark. The film was released on May 13, 1937, by Republic Pictures.

== Plot ==
South of the border, Johnny Darrel and his fellow American sidekick are nearly broke and eager to return to Texas. They meet Oscar, a fellow American who is forced to work for Manuel Mendez, the owner of the cantina. Johnny decides to enter a poker game to gain money to buy Oscar out of his debt, but when Mendez is caught cheating, Johnny shoots out the lights. During the shootout his friend is killed with Mendez convincing Johnny that he did the deed. In remorse, Johnny brings his friend's body back to Texas to bury him and vows to never carry a firearm again.

He is caught between a war between two cattle ranches, one owned by Joan Williams, the other by Brace Stevens.

== Cast ==
- Johnny Mack Brown as Johnny Darrel
- Claire Rochelle as Joan Williams
- Syd Saylor as Oscar
- Ted Adams as Manuel Mendez
- Dick Curtis as Brace Stevens
- Steve Clark as Pete Small
- Jim Corey as Jim Badger
- Julian Madison as Dick Martin
- Roger Williams as Ranger Adams
