= Ridin' the Lone Trail =

1937 film by Sam Newfield

- Theatrical release poster
- Directed by: Sam Newfield
- Screenplay by: Charles F. Royal
- Story by: E.B. Mann
- Produced by: A. W. Hackel
- Starring: Bob Steele; Claire Rochelle; Charles King; Ernie Adams; Lew Meehan; Julian Rivero
- Cinematography: Robert E. Cline
- Edited by: S. Roy Luby
- Production company: Supreme Pictures Corporation
- Distributed by: Republic Pictures
- Release date: September 1, 1937
- Running time: 56 minutes
- Country: United States
- Language: English

Ridin' the Lone Trail is a 1937 American Western film directed by Sam Newfield, written by Charles F. Royal, and starring Bob Steele, Claire Rochelle, Charles King, Ernie Adams, Lew Meehan and Julian Rivero. The film was released on September 1, 1937, by Republic Pictures.

== Plot ==
Marshal Bob McArthur investigates a train hijacking gang led by an outlaw with a beautiful white horse.

== Cast ==
- Bob Steele as Bob McArthur
- Claire Rochelle as Joan Randall
- Charles King as Dusty Williams
- Ernie Adams as Peters
- Lew Meehan as Henchman Sparks
- Julian Rivero as Henchman Pedro
- Steve Clark as Sheriff Carson
- Hal Price as Furman
- Frank Ball as Randall
