= Undercover Man =

Undercover Man may refer to:

- Undercover Man (1942 film), an American Western film
- Undercover Man (1936 film), an American Western film
- Under-Cover Man, a 1932 American pre-Code crime film
- The Undercover Man, a 1949 American crime drama film noir
