= Once to Every Woman =

Once to Every Woman may refer to:

- Once to Every Woman (1920 film), an American silent drama film
- Once to Every Woman (1934 film), an American pre-Code film
