= Alias John Law =

1935 film

- Theatrical release poster
- Directed by: Robert N. Bradbury
- Written by: Robert N. Bradbury (screenplay); Forbes Parkhill (story)
- Produced by: A.W. Hackel for Supreme Pictures
- Starring: See below
- Cinematography: William Nobles
- Edited by: S. Roy Luby
- Distributed by: William Steiner Productions
- Release date: November 5, 1935
- Running time: 59 minutes
- Country: United States
- Language: English

Alias John Law is a 1935 American Western film directed by Robert N. Bradbury and starring Bob Steele. It was produced by Supreme Pictures and released by William Steiner Productions on a states-rights basis. It was remade in 1950 as West of the Brazos.

== Cast ==
- Bob Steele as Everett Tarkington 'John' Clark
- Roberta Gale as JoAnne Vallon
- Buck Connors as Bootch Collum
- Earl Dwire as The Kootney Kid, posing as Everett Tarkington Clark
- Robert McKenzie as Judge
- Steve Clark as Henchman Simi
- Jack Rockwell as Marshal Lamar Blyth
- Roger Williams as Sheriff
- Jack Cowell as Attorney Wagner

== See also ==
- Bob Steele filmography
