= Viola Lawrence =

American editor

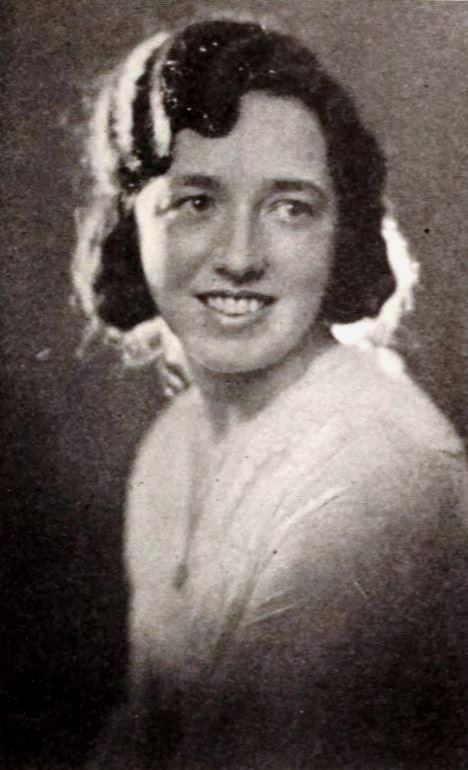
- From a 1920 magazine
- Born: December 2, 1894; Brooklyn, New York, United States
- Died: November 20, 1973 (aged 78); Hollywood, Los Angeles, California, United States
- Occupation: Film editor

Viola Mallory Lawrence (December 2, 1894, New York City – November 20, 1973) is considered by many to be the first female film editor in Hollywood. She was nominated twice for the Academy Award for Best Film Editing: for Pal Joey (1957), with Jerome Thoms; and for Pepe (1960), with Al Clark.

== Career ==
She began working at Vitagraph Studios in Flatbush, Brooklyn as a messenger at the age of 11. At 12, she was holding title cards. In 1915, she became the second female film cutter in cinema history, after Anna McKnight, who also worked at Vitagraph. She married Frank Lawrence, her film cutting teacher at Vitagraph.

In 1917, she moved to Hollywood and worked for Universal, First National, Gloria Swanson Productions, and Columbia Pictures at various times. She became Columbia's "head editor" or "supervising editor" in 1925. After director Erich von Stroheim was fired from the production of Queen Kelly (1929), star Gloria Swanson herself directed an alternate ending, with the help of cinematographer Gregg Toland and Lawrence. Lawrence edited Samuel Goldwyn Studio's first sound film, Bulldog Drummond (1929). She rejoined Columbia in 1934 and remained at the studio for the rest of her career, ending with Pepe (1960). She was a founding member of American Cinema Editors.

Orson Welles biographer Charles Higham wrote that, when Lawrence was assigned to The Lady from Shanghai (1947), she reported to studio boss Harry Cohn that "the footage was a jumbled mess". She also informed Cohn that Welles "had not shot a single close-up"; Welles reluctantly obeyed orders to add some. Following poorly received previews, the studio instructed Lawrence to make drastic cuts, over an hour of footage, shortening the film to 87 minutes.

The California State University, Fullerton University Archives and Special Collections has a collection of material related to Lawrence.

== Complete filmography ==
- Within the Law (1917) (as Viola Mallory)
- An Alabaster Box (1917) (as Viola Mallory)
- The Heart of Humanity (1918) (as Viola Mallory)
- Loot (1919) (as Viola Mallory)
- His Divorced Wife (1919) (as Viola Mallory)
- The Virgin of Stamboul (1920) (uncredited)
- Once to Every Woman (1920) (uncredited)
- Man, Woman & Marriage (1921)
- Fighting the Flames (1925)
- The Winning of Barbara Worth (1926)
- The Devil Dancer (1927)
- Two Lovers (1928)
- The Awakening (1928)
- Queen Kelly (1929)
- Bulldog Drummond (1929)
- This Is Heaven (1929)
- What a Widow! (1930)
- The Pagan Lady (1931)
- Men Are Such Fools (1932)
- Sailor Be Good (1933)
- Man's Castle (1933)
- No Greater Glory (1934)
- Whom the Gods Destroy (1934)
- The Party's Over (1934)
- Lady by Choice (1934)
- The Whole Town's Talking (1935)
- Party Wire (1935)
- Love Me Forever (1935)
- A Feather in Her Hat (1935)
- The Lone Wolf Returns (1935)
- Lady of Secrets (1936)
- The King Steps Out (1936)
- Craig's Wife (1936)
- Devil's Playground (1937)
- Speed to Spare (1937)
- Life Begins with Love (1937)
- She Married an Artist (1937)
- Penitentiary (1938)
- There's Always a Woman (1938)
- City Streets (1938)
- I Am the Law (1938)
- There's That Woman Again (1938)
- Only Angels Have Wings (1939)
- Blondie Takes a Vacation (1939)
- The Amazing Mr. Williams (1939)
- Five Little Peppers at Home (1940)
- The Doctor Takes a Wife (1940)
- He Stayed for Breakfast (1940)
- Glamour for Sale (1940)
- This Thing Called Love (1940)
- The Lone Wolf Takes a Chance (1941)
- The Big Boss (1941)
- Two in a Taxi (1941)
- Here Comes Mr. Jordan (1941)
- You Belong to Me (1941)
- Bedtime Story (1941)
- Screen Snapshots Series 21, No. 6 (1942 short)
- Two Yanks in Trinidad (1942)
- They All Kissed the Bride (1942)
- My Sister Eileen (1942)
- One Dangerous Night (1943)
- First Comes Courage (1943)
- Cover Girl (1944)
- Secret Command (1944)
- Tonight and Every Night (1945)
- She Wouldn't Say Yes (1945)
- Hit the Hay (1945)
- The Fighting Guardsman (1946)
- Perilous Holiday (1946)
- Down to Earth (1947)
- The Lady from Shanghai (1947)
- Mary Lou (1948)
- The Gallant Blade (1948)
- Leather Gloves (1948)
- The Dark Past (1948)
- Knock on Any Door (1949)
- Tokyo Joe (1949)
- And Baby Makes Three (1949)
- The Traveling Saleswoman (1950)
- In a Lonely Place (1950)
- Harriet Craig (1950)
- The Flying Missile (1950)
- Sirocco (1951)
- The First Time (1952)
- Paula (1952)
- Affair in Trinidad (1952)
- Salome (1953)
- Man in the Dark (1953)
- Miss Sadie Thompson (1953)
- Jesse James vs. the Daltons (1954)
- The Miami Story (1954)
- Three for the Show (1955)
- Tight Spot (1955)
- Chicago Syndicate (1955)
- Queen Bee (1955)
- The Eddy Duchin Story (1956)
- Jeanne Eagels (1957)
- Pal Joey (1957)
- Who Was That Lady? (1960)
- Pepe (1960)
