= The Feud Maker =

1938 film by Sam Newfield

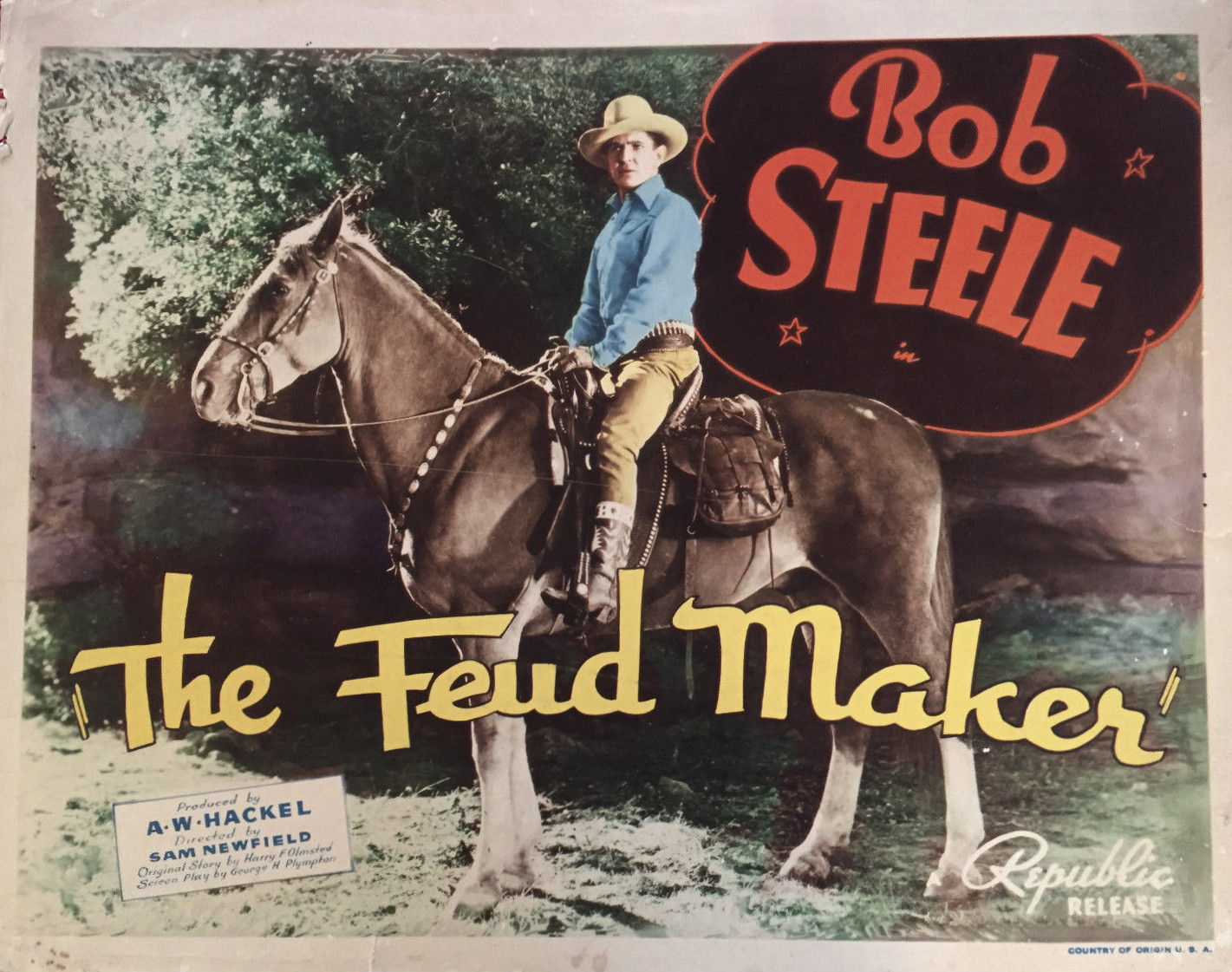
- Lobby card
- Directed by: Sam Newfield
- Written by: Harry F. Olmsted (story); George H. Plympton (screenplay)
- Produced by: A.W. Hackel
- Starring: See below
- Cinematography: Robert E. Cline
- Edited by: S. Roy Luby
- Distributed by: Republic Pictures
- Release date: April 15, 1938
- Running time: 55 minutes
- Country: United States
- Language: English

The Feud Maker is a 1938 American Western film directed by Sam Newfield.

== Cast ==
- Bob Steele as Texas Ryan aka Wind River Kid
- Marion Weldon as Sally Harbison
- Karl Hackett as Rand Lassiter / Ross Landers
- Frank Ball as Ben Harbison
- Budd Buster as 'Cowlick' Connors
- Lew Meehan as Jake Slaven
- Roger Williams as Sheriff Manton
- Forrest Taylor as Marshal John Kincaid
- Jack C. Smith as Nelson
- Steve Clark as Mark - Cowhand
- Lloyd Ingraham as Hank Younger

== See also ==
- Bob Steele filmography
