= The Right to Happiness =

- Directed by: Tom Ricketts
- Written by: Olga Linek Scholl
- Starring: Jack Richardson; Louise Lester; Vivian Rich; Harry von Meter; Joseph Galbraith
- Distributed by: Mutual Film
- Release date: June 7, 1915
- Country: United States
- Languages: Silent film English intertitles

The Right to Happiness is a 1915 American silent short drama film directed by Tom Ricketts starring Jack Richardson, Louise Lester, Vivian Rich, Harry von Meter, and Joseph Galbraith.

== Plot ==
This synopsis comes from the original copyright filing for the film at the Library of Congress:

Joe Blaney's wife, and his employer, who is his father-in-law, believe him guilty of stealing money from the firm. The chief in reality was a firm member, but so cleverly did he cover his tracks, that circumstances point straight to young Blaney. Joe, in sheer despair because even his wife was against him, flees to a small western mining community to forget his woes and begin life anew. He secures a mail route and works so faithfully that he earns the deepest regard and respect of the citizens.

Meanwhile Frances, his wife, sues for divorce but objects to the condition set forth in the decree, so the divorce is not obtained and she and Joe remain husband and wife, in the eyes of the law.

In the western mining town Joe is diligent. Elsa, the daughter of the hotel keeper, falls in love with him, because of his manly qualities. She fancies that Joe returned her love, yet she wonders at his continued silence. Carlos a Mexican, is in love with Elsa and in a brute way attempts to force her to be his wife. To escape the unwelcome attentions of Carlos, Elsa goes to Joe and tells him of her deep love for him. Joe, like the true man that he is, reveals to Elsa the story of his past – the barrier between himself and her. Tearful and heart broken, Elsa seeks the solitude of the rugged forest that she may be alone in her deep disappointment.

In Joe's heart there arises a deep love for Elsa but the fact that he has a wife, hangs heavy over his head. While Joe is in the depths of his sorrow, his eyes chance on a newspaper in which is an account of the divorce suit filed by his wife. He thinks of course the decree was granted, and in all haste he seeks Elsa. They are married

Months pass. The true thief's conscience hurts him and he confesses to the crime of which Joe was accused. Frances Blaney, repentant for her hasty judgment against her husband, seeks Joe in his mining home and would return to him. In a vine covered cabin in a mountain nook, Frances comes on Elsa, happy in her husband's love, playing with their fair haired baby. Joe is away in the mountains prospecting. Frances is on the point of revealing her identity, when word comes that Joe has been hurt and needs help.

Oblivious of all but her husband's need, Elsa gives the baby to Frances to care for while she rushes to aid the injured Joe. She causes Joe to be carried into the little cabin and there she ministers to him until he is well on the road to recovery. Frances, with contrite heart, witnesses the deep affection between Joe and Elsa. She comes to a realization that Elsa, not herself, has earned the right to happiness with Joe. With true sacrifice, Frances leaves the lovers, returns to her eastern home, accepts the conditions of the divorce decree and Joe is left forever with the brave little mountain girl who won his heart.
