= Last of the Warrens =

1936 film by Robert N. Bradbury

- Theatrical release poster
- Directed by: Robert N. Bradbury
- Written by: Robert N. Bradbury
- Produced by: A.W. Hackel (producer)
- Starring: See below
- Cinematography: Bert Longenecker
- Edited by: S. Roy Luby
- Release date: May 10, 1936
- Running time: 60 minutes
- Country: United States
- Language: English

Last of the Warrens is a 1936 American Western film directed by Robert N. Bradbury.

== Cast ==
- Bob Steele as Ted Warren
- Margaret Marquis as Mary Burns
- Charles King as Kent, aka Shelby
- Horace Murphy as Grizzly
- Lafe McKee as Sheriff Bates
- Charles K. French as Bruce Warren
- Blackie Whiteford as Slippery Gerns
- Steve Clark as Henchman Spike

== See also ==
- Bob Steele filmography
