= Gun Lords of Stirrup Basin =

1937 film by Sam Newfield

- Original film poster
- Directed by: Sam Newfield
- Screenplay by: Fred Myton; George H. Plympton
- Story by: Harry M. Olmsted
- Produced by: A. W. Hackell
- Starring: Bob Steele; Louise Stanley; Karl Hackett
- Cinematography: Bert Longenecker
- Edited by: S. Roy Luby
- Production company: Supreme Pictures
- Distributed by: Republic Pictures
- Release date: May 18, 1937 (United States)
- Running time: 53 minutes
- Country: United States
- Language: English

Gun Lords of Stirrup Basin is a 1937 American Western film directed by Sam Newfield for Supreme Pictures for release by Republic Pictures. It stars Bob Steele, Louise Stanley, and Karl Hackett.

== Plot ==
Dan Stockton and Gail Dawson have been involved in a Romeo and Juliet type romance as Dan's family are cattlemen and Gail's are farmers. With enough water and land, a truce has been maintained, but lawyer Gabe Bowdre sees the chance to sell land after he starts a war between the two factions by having his henchmen do a series of murders.

== Cast ==
- Bob Steele as Dan Stockton
- Louise Stanley as Gail Dawson Stockton
- Karl Hackett as Gabe Bowdre
- Ernie Adams as Red
- Frank Ball as Hub Stockton

== Critical reception ==
Variety gave a positive view and wrote that it was "a better western" that should do well at the box office. It praised the actor, Bob Steele, and wrote that his performance was "up to his usual excellent western calibre."

== See also ==
- Bob Steele filmography
