= Desert Patrol (film) =

1938 film by Sam Newfield

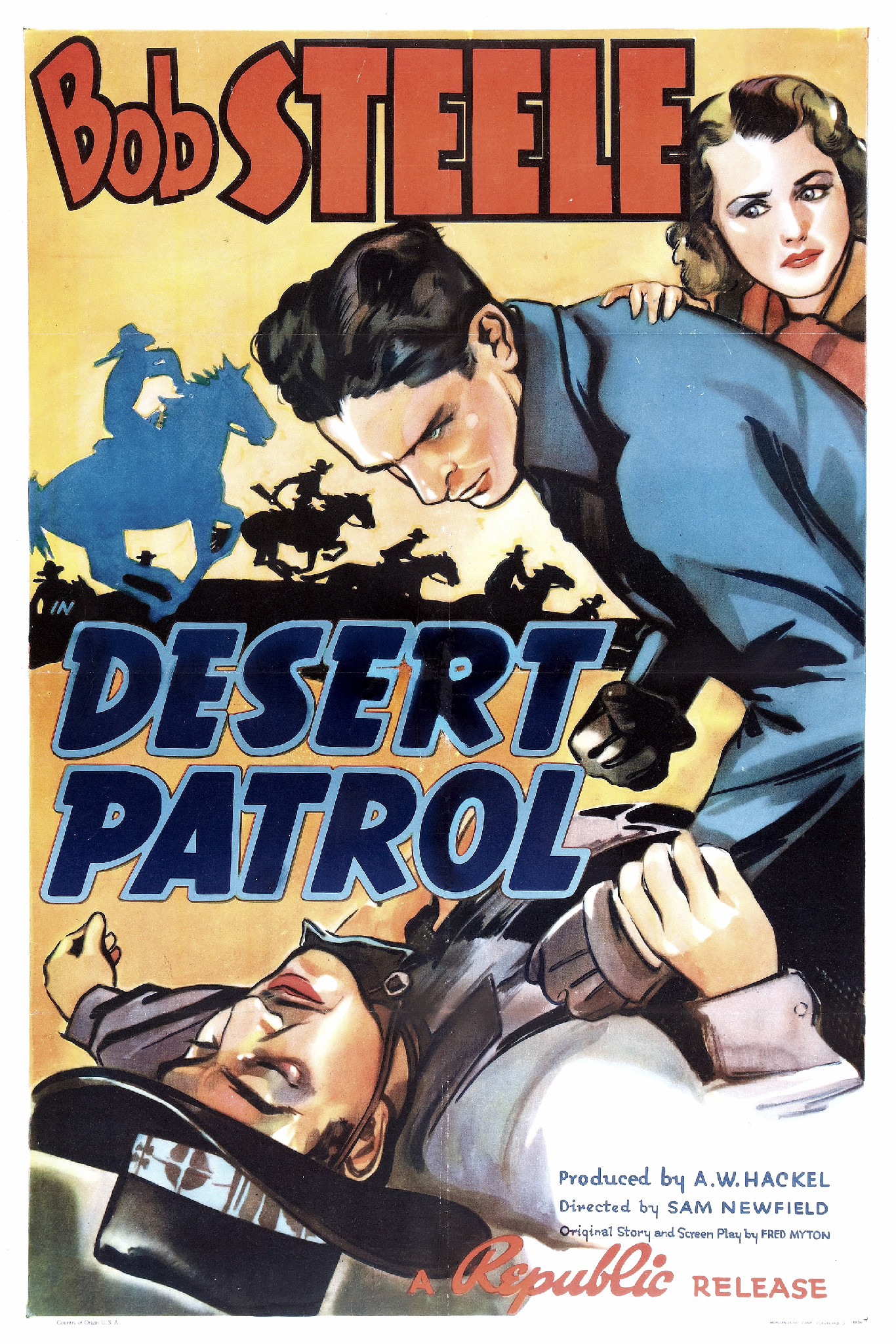
- Theatrical release poster
- Directed by: Sam Newfield
- Screenplay by: Fred Myton
- Story by: Fred Myton
- Produced by: A. W. Hackel
- Starring: Bob Steele; Marion Weldon; Rex Lease; Ted Adams; Forrest Taylor; Budd Buster
- Cinematography: Robert E. Cline
- Edited by: Robert O. Crandall
- Production company: Supreme Pictures Corporation
- Distributed by: Republic Pictures
- Release date: June 6, 1938
- Running time: 56 minutes
- Country: United States
- Language: English

Desert Patrol is a 1938 American Western film directed by Sam Newfield and written by Fred Myton. The film stars Bob Steele, Marion Weldon, Rex Lease, Ted Adams, Forrest Taylor and Budd Buster. The film was released on June 6, 1938, by Republic Pictures.

== Plot ==
After the death of a Ranger, Dave Austin is tasked by the Captain to conduct an investigation. To gather information, he assumes the identity of an outlaw and encounters Apache Joe, who he discovers is the perpetrator. Additionally, he becomes acquainted with Dan Drury, who facilitates money transfers between Apache Joe and his superior. Austin secures employment on Drury's ranch, but encounters difficulties when Drury's sister Jean exposes his true identity.

== Cast ==
- Bob Steele as Dave Austin
- Marion Weldon as Jean Drury
- Rex Lease as Dan Drury
- Ted Adams as Apache Joe
- Forrest Taylor as Martin Rand
- Budd Buster as Hezi Watts
- Steve Clark as Captain
- Jack Ingram as Chet
- Julian Madison as Carson
