= Olga Linek Scholl =

Czech-American screenwriter

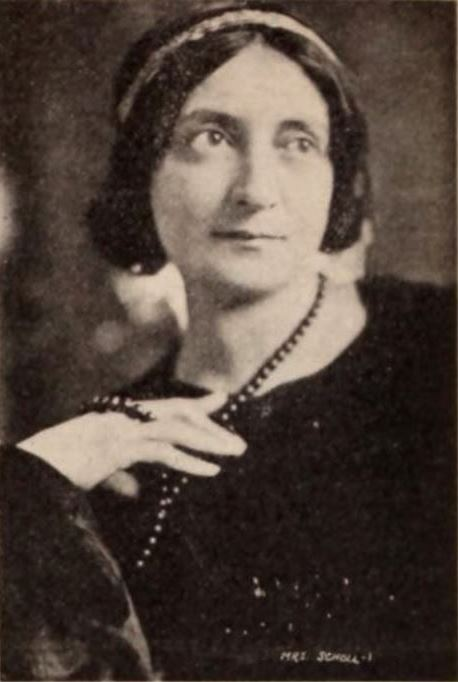
- Born: January 28, 1884; Austria-Hungary
- Died: September 21, 1982 (aged 98); San Mateo, California, USA
- Occupation: Screenwriter
- Spouse: Edward Scholl

Olga Linek Scholl (also known as Olga Linek Russ; 1884–1982) was a Czech-American screenwriter who worked in Hollywood during the silent era.

She was born in Austria-Hungary to Edward Linek and Laura Jansig; the family moved to New York City when she was young. Olga married Russia-born portrait painter Edward Scholl. The pair had a daughter together. After moving to Los Angeles and writing for film during the medium's early years, she transitioned into writing for the radio in the 1930s.

== Selected films ==
- The Net (1923)
- Man-Woman-Marriage (1921)
- Once to Every Woman (1920)
- The Right to Happiness (1919)
- The Heart of Humanity (1918)
