= Margaret Marquis =

American actress

Margaret Alice Marquis
- Born: August 19, 1919; North Bay, Ontario, Canada
- Died: January 19, 1993 (aged 73); Phoenix, Arizona, U.S.
- Occupation: Actress
- Years active: 1931–1943 (film)
- Spouse(s): David c. McCoig (1937 - ?); Robert F. Stump (? - 1947, divorce)
- Parent(s): Mr. and Mrs. Leon Marquis

Margaret Alice Marquis (August 19, 1919 – January 19, 1993) was a Canadian-American film actress.

Marquis was the daughter of Mr. and Mrs. Leon Marquis.

== Personal life ==
On November 1, 1937, Marquis married Universal Studios publicist David C. McCoig. She wed Robert F. Stump, a Hollywood chiropractor, in 1946; he had been one of the judges a few years earlier in a "perfect back" contest she had won; they divorced in 1947.

== Selected filmography ==
- Penrod and Sam (1931)
- Brand of the Outlaws (1936)
- Last of the Warrens (1936)
- A Family Affair (1937)
- My Old Kentucky Home (1938)
- Cassidy of Bar 20 (1938)
- Strike Up the Band (1940)
- Escort Girl (1941)

== Bibliography ==
- Pitts, Michael R. Western Movies: A Guide to 5,105 Feature Films. McFarland, 2012.
