= Riders of the Sage =

1939 film

- Directed by: Harry S. Webb
- Written by: Forrest Sheldon (story); Carl Krusada (screenplay)
- Produced by: Harry S. Webb
- Starring: See below
- Cinematography: Edward A. Kull
- Edited by: Frederick Bain
- Production company: Frank Sanucci
- Distributed by: Metropolitan Pictures Corporation
- Release date: 1 August 1939
- Running time: 57 minutes
- Country: United States
- Language: English

Riders of the Sage is a 1939 American Western film produced and directed by Harry S. Webb starring Bob Steele. The film is a remake of Ridin' Law (1930) and Rusty Rides Alone (1933).

== Plot ==
Bob Burke comes to Apache Basin to visit his old friend Tom Martin. He finds himself in the middle of a range war between sheepherders led by the Halsey family and the cattlemen including the Martin family. The Halseys are holding Tom Martin prisoner in order to gain the Martin ranch. Further complications ensue when Mona Halsey is in love with the Robin Hood type Poe Powers who leads a gang of merry men known as the Riders of the Sage. Halsey finds himself smack in the middle of a three way fight.

== Cast ==
- Bob Steele as Bob Burke
- Claire Rochelle as Mona Halsey
- Ralph Hoopes as Buddy Martin
- Jimmy Aubrey as Steve Reynolds
- Carleton Young as Luke Halsey
- Earl Douglas as Hank Halsey
- Ted Adams as Poe Powers
- Dave O'Brien as Tom Martin
- Frank LaRue as Jim Martin
- Bruce Dane as Rusty, the Singer
- Jerry Sheldon as Herb
- Reed Howes as Sam Halsey
- Bud Osborne as Sheriff

== See also ==
- Bob Steele filmography
