= Mesquite Buckaroo =

1939 film

Mesquite Buckaroo is a 1939 American black-and-white Western film. Directed by Harry S. Webb and scripted by George H. Plympton, the film was produced by Metropolitan Pictures and distributed by State Rights. It features Bob Steele as Bob Allen, a champion rodeo-playing cowboy, who is kidnapped by "Trigger" Carson, played by Charles King, and his gang of crooks. Mesquite Buckaroo was released in the United States on May 1, 1939.

== See also ==
- Bob Steele filmography
