= Double Exposure (1944 film) =

1944 film by William A. Berke

- Directed by: William Berke
- Written by: Ralph Graves (story); Winston Miller (story and screenplay); Maxwell Shane (screenplay)
- Produced by: William H. Pine (as William Pine); William C. Thomas (as William Thomas)
- Starring: Chester Morris; Nancy Kelly
- Cinematography: Fred Jackman Jr.
- Edited by: Henry Adams; Howard A. Smith
- Music by: Alexander Laszlo
- Distributed by: Paramount Pictures
- Release date: December 18, 1944
- Running time: 63 minutes
- Country: United States
- Language: English

Double Exposure is a 1944 American crime comedy film directed by William Berke, and starring Chester Morris and Nancy Kelly.

== Plot ==
In New York City, James R. Tarlock, a fitness fanatic and publisher of the picture magazine Flick, tells his editor, Larry Burke, to hire Pat Marvin, a small town Iowa photographer, based on a great photograph of a crashing airplane. After Tarlock leaves, Larry fires a photographer for faking a picture. It turns out that Pat's boyfriend, Ben Scribner (Phillip Terry), faked her airplane picture. Pat is excited about the job offer. Ben is less enthused about her leaving for the big city, but supports her decision to take the job.

Larry is pleased to discover that his new employee is an attractive woman and takes her out to dinner. Pat seizes an opportunity by taking photographs of Dolores Tucker, the wife of much-married millionaire Sonny Tucker, lying on the floor of the restaurant's ladies' room after a suicide attempt. For a follow-up, Pat disguises herself as a chorus girl to gain entrance to Sonny's apartment. Dolores walks in shortly afterward and becomes jealous. Pat has to knock her out with a punch to get away, taking pictures of Dolores and Sonny before and after.

Pat invents a brother named Ben to fend off Larry's amorous advances. To Pat's surprise, the real Ben follows her to New York. When Larry walks in on them, Pat introduces her "brother". Ben reluctantly goes along with the deception. He decides to stay in New York, and talks Larry into giving him a job.

Meanwhile, Sonny asks Pat to marry him, after he divorces Dolores. Dolores makes a scene when she finds them together at a nightclub.

Larry finally finds out about Ben and does not believe Pat when she says she was going to tell him. In anger, he sends Ben on an assignment, one that (unbeknownst to him) puts him aboard a ship bound for Russia. Meanwhile, Tarlock assigns Pat to take a series of photographs of a fake murder for the magazine's readers to try to solve. However, the photo of Pat, as the "victim", looks just like a real police photo of the dead Dolores, slumped face down on a couch. Pat is indicted for murder. Larry tries to get Ben back to corroborate Pat's story, but learns that Ben was not among the survivors when his ship was torpedoed. Larry proves that Sonny killed Dolores. Afterward, Larry breaks up with Pat, guilt-ridden over Ben's death. Then Ben shows up and punches him. It turns out Ben spent twenty days on a raft with another woman and married her.

== Cast ==
- Chester Morris as Larry Burke
- Nancy Kelly as Patricia "Pat" Marvin
- Phillip Terry as Ben Scribner
- Jane Farrar as Dolores Tucker
- Richard Gaines as James R. Tarlock
- Charles Arnt as Sonny Tucker
- Claire Rochelle as Smitty
- Roma Aldrich as Mavis

== Reception ==
Pine Thomas announced a sequel, Over Exposed with William Gargan.
