= A Gentle Gangster =

1943 black-and-white drama film directed by Phil Rosen

- Directed by: Phil Rosen
- Written by: Jefferson Parker; Al Martin
- Produced by: A. W. Hackel
- Starring: Molly Lamont; Barton MacLane; Dick Wessel
- Cinematography: Harry Neumann
- Edited by: Martin G. Cohn
- Distributed by: Republic Pictures
- Release date: May 10, 1943 (USA)
- Running time: 57 minutes
- Country: USA
- Language: English

A Gentle Gangster is a 1943 black-and-white drama film, directed by Phil Rosen and produced by A. W. Hackel.

== Cast ==
- Molly Lamont as Ann Hallit
- Barton MacLane as Mike Hallit
- Dick Wessel as Steve Parker
- Joyce Compton as Kitty Parker
- Jack La Rue as Hugo
- Cy Kendall as Al Malone
- Rosella Towne as Helen Barton
- Ray Teal as Joe Barton
- Crane Whitley as Reverend Hamilton
- Elliot Sullivan as Lefty
- Anthony Warde as Charles
