= The Kid from Santa Fe =

- Theatrical release poster
- Directed by: Raymond K. Johnson
- Screenplay by: Carl Krusada
- Story by: Joseph P. Murphy
- Produced by: Harry S. Webb
- Starring: Jack Randall; Clarene Curtis; Forrest Taylor; Claire Rochelle; Tom London; George Chesebro
- Cinematography: William Hyer; Edward A. Kull
- Edited by: Robert Golden
- Production company: Metropolitan Pictures
- Distributed by: Monogram Pictures
- Release date: May 23, 1940
- Running time: 57 minutes
- Country: United States
- Language: English

The Kid from Santa Fe is a 1940 American Western film directed by Raymond K. Johnson and written by Carl Krusada. The film stars Jack Randall, Clarene Curtis, Forrest Taylor, Claire Rochelle, Tom London and George Chesebro. The film was released on May 23, 1940, by Monogram Pictures.

== Plot ==
Sheriff Holt hires a new deputy that goes by the name Santa Fe Kid. Kid decides to disguise himself as a bandit, to track down a gang of smugglers in the Mexican border. He then discovers that the gang leader is a respected townsman, Bill Stewart.

== Cast ==
- Jack Randall as Santa Fe Kid
- Clarene Curtis as Anne Holt
- Forrest Taylor as Sheriff Holt
- Claire Rochelle as Millie Logan
- Tom London as Bill Stewart
- George Chesebro as Kent
- Dave O'Brien as Chester
- Jimmy Aubrey as Henry Lupton
- Kenne Duncan as Joe Lavida
- Carl Mathews as George
- Steve Clark as Herman
