= The Gambling Terror =

1937 film by Sam Newfield

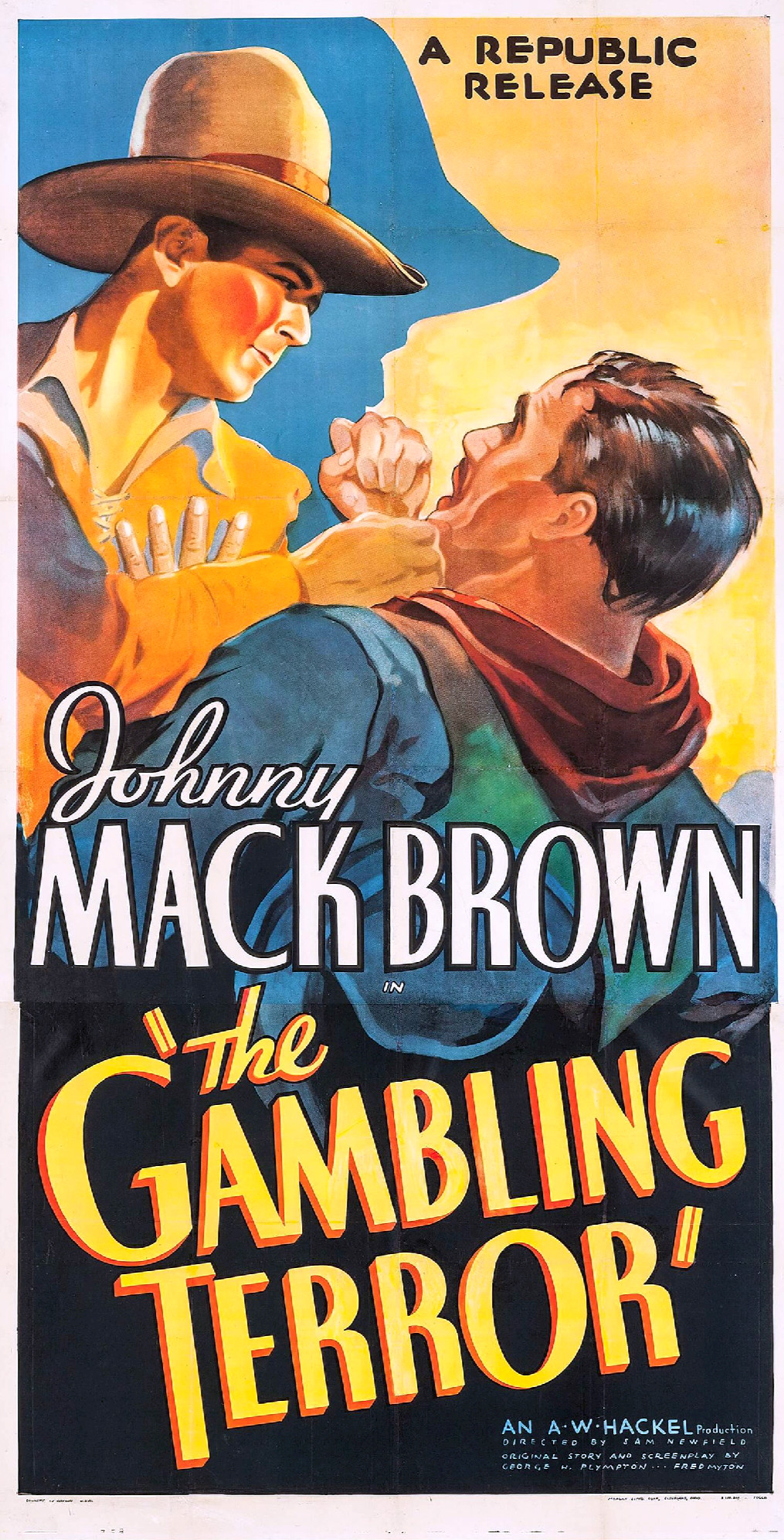
- Film poster
- Directed by: Sam Newfield
- Written by: George H. Plympton; Fred Myton
- Produced by: A.W. Hackel
- Starring: Johnny Mack Brown; Iris Meredith; Charles King
- Cinematography: Bert Longenecker
- Edited by: S. Roy Luby
- Production company: Supreme Pictures
- Distributed by: Republic Pictures
- Release date: February 15, 1937
- Running time: 53 minutes
- Country: United States
- Language: English

The Gambling Terror is a 1937 American Western film directed by Sam Newfield and starring Johnny Mack Brown, Iris Meredith and Charles King.

== Plot ==
A town is effectively terrorised by a protection racket with no one knowing who their leader is. Their only opposition is the editor of a local newspaper. When the editor's young son is caught listening to a pair to thugs victimizing a farmer, the thugs threaten to beat him to tell them what he heard. They are thwarted and beaten up by Jeff Hayes, a gambler who is passing through town. When they threaten retribution, he laughs in their faces, telling them that anyone who would horsewhip a child would not be too much for a man to worry about.

Gambling in the town saloon was stopped by the protection racket when they would not pay tribute. Jeff refuses to pay and gives the now frightened thugs a sample of his quick draw and expert marksmanship with his pair of six shooters. Jeff is cheered by the town, but despised because he is a gambler by the editor's daughter. The editor wants Jeff to join his vigilantes, but Jeff warns the editor that you do not fight bushwhackers by riding on the skyline.

Brett, the overseer of the thugs, proposes that as Jeff is a gambler, he would go for the most profit, in his case a large percentage of the proceeds of the operation. As insurance, the thugs kidnap the editor's son.

== Cast ==
- Johnny Mack Brown as Jeff Hayes
- Iris Meredith as Betty Garret
- Charles King as Brett
- Dick Curtis as Dirk
- Ted Adams as Sheriff
- Horace Murphy as Missouri Bill
- Earl Dwire as Bradley
- Frank Ball as Garret
- Bobby Nelson as Jerry Garret
- Lloyd Ingraham as Mr. Nestor
- Emma Tansey as Mrs. Nestor
- Budd Buster as Shorty

== Bibliography ==
- Pitts, Michael R. Western Movies: A Guide to 5,105 Feature Films. McFarland, 2012.
