= Let George Do It (film series) =

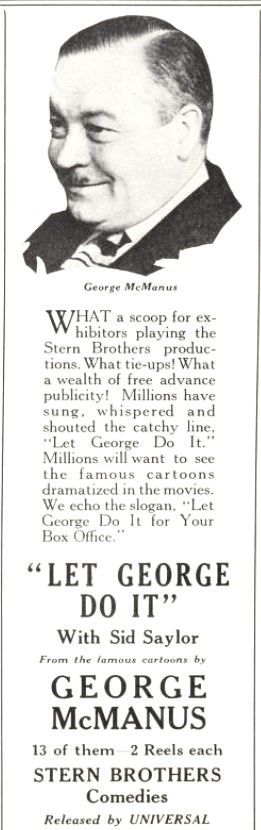
Advertisement

Let George Do It was a series of two-reeler American silent comedy films produced in the latter half of the 1920s.

The films (40 in all) were based on the comic strip Let George Do It, which was written and drawn by George McManus (who later created the more famous strip Bringing Up Father). The series was produced by the Stern Brothers (Julius Stern and Abe Stern) and was one of many silent comedy series issued by Universal Pictures.

Syd Saylor starred as George in all of the films. His supporting players included Thelma Daniels, Jean Doree, Dorothy Gulliver, Colin Chase, Dorothy Coburn, Harry Martell, Derelys Perdue, Marie D'Arcy, Betty Walsh, and Lorima Clark.

The New York Times, in a 1927 review of one of the shorts (on the bill with the feature The Callahans and the Murphys at the Capitol Theatre), described it as a "comedy of the conventional kind" which "gets its share of laughs". Raymond Ganly, in Motion Picture News, wrote that Television George "contains some good fun patterned after the usual 'dumb' comedy style of its star, Syd Saylor" and "releases a high proportion of merriment".

== Films in the series ==
- George The Winner (1926), directed by Francis Corby
- Why George! (1926)
- George's in Love (1926)
- And George Did! (1926), directed by Scott Pembroke
- By George (1927)
- George Runs Wild (1927)
- Backward George (1927)
- George Leaves Home (1927)
- Kid George (1927), directed by Francis Corby
- George's Many Loves (1927)
- On Furlough (1927) directed by Sam Newfield
- Oh, Taxi! (1927), directed by Francis Corby
- Rushing Business (1927)
- George Steps Out (1927)
- Picking On George (1927), directed by George Meins
- The Disordered Orderly (1927), directed by Gus Meins and Sam Newfield
- On Deck (1927), directed by Sam Newfield
- Model George (1927)
- High Flyin' George (1928)
- Man of Letters (1928)
- George's False Alarm (1928), directed by Sam Newfield
- Watch, George! (1928)
- When George Hops (1928)
- Sailor George (1928), directed by Sam Newfield
- George's School Daze (1928), directed by Sam Newfield
- George Meets George (1928)
- Big Game George (1928)
- She's My Girl (1928)
- Rubbernecks (1928), directed by Gus Meins

Antics at a restaurant with George and Pal making flapjacks and later posing as detectives in a hotel.

- Look Pleasant (1928)
- The Cross Country Bunion Race (1928)
- All For Geraldine (1928), directed by Gus Meins
- Sailor Suits (1929), directed by Gus Meins
- Crushed Hats (1929), directed by Gus Meins
- Television George (1929), directed by Francis Corby

This film posits a world where television is practicable. George carries on with girls in a television broadcasting studio, unaware that his wife is seeing this on her receiving set. Hijinks ensue.

- Seeing Sights (1929), directed by Gus Meins
- Private Business (1929), directed by Gus Meins
- Close Shaves (1929), directed by Francis Corby
- Hot Puppies (1929), directed by Gus Meins
- Fly Cops (1929), directed by Francis Corby
- The Cut-Ups (1929), directed by Francis Corby

Henry thinks he has inherited a million and George decides to pose as a butler to impress his girl and her many relatives.
