= Doomed at Sundown =

1937 film by Sam Newfield

- Directed by: Sam Newfield
- Screenplay by: George H. Plympton
- Story by: Fred Myton
- Produced by: A. W. Hackel
- Starring: Bob Steele; Lorraine Randall; Warner Richmond; Earl Dwire; Harold Daniels; David Sharpe
- Cinematography: Bert Longenecker
- Edited by: S. Roy Luby
- Production company: Supreme Pictures Corporation
- Distributed by: Republic Pictures
- Release date: July 7, 1937
- Running time: 53 minutes
- Country: United States
- Language: English

Doomed at Sundown is a 1937 American Western film directed by Sam Newfield and written by George H. Plympton. The film stars Bob Steele, Lorraine Randall, Warner Richmond, Earl Dwire, Harold Daniels and David Sharpe. The film was released on July 7, 1937, by Republic Pictures.

== Plot ==
Dave Austin is the son of the Sheriff, when his father gets killed with a knife Dave takes his badge and starts searching for the man who killed his father.

== Cast ==
- Bob Steele as Dave Austin
- Lorraine Randall as Jean Williams
- Warner Richmond as Jim Hatfield
- Earl Dwire as Butch Brawley
- Harold Daniels as Dante Sprague
- David Sharpe as Don Williams
- Horace B. Carpenter as Lew Sprague
