= Am I Guilty? =

1940 American film

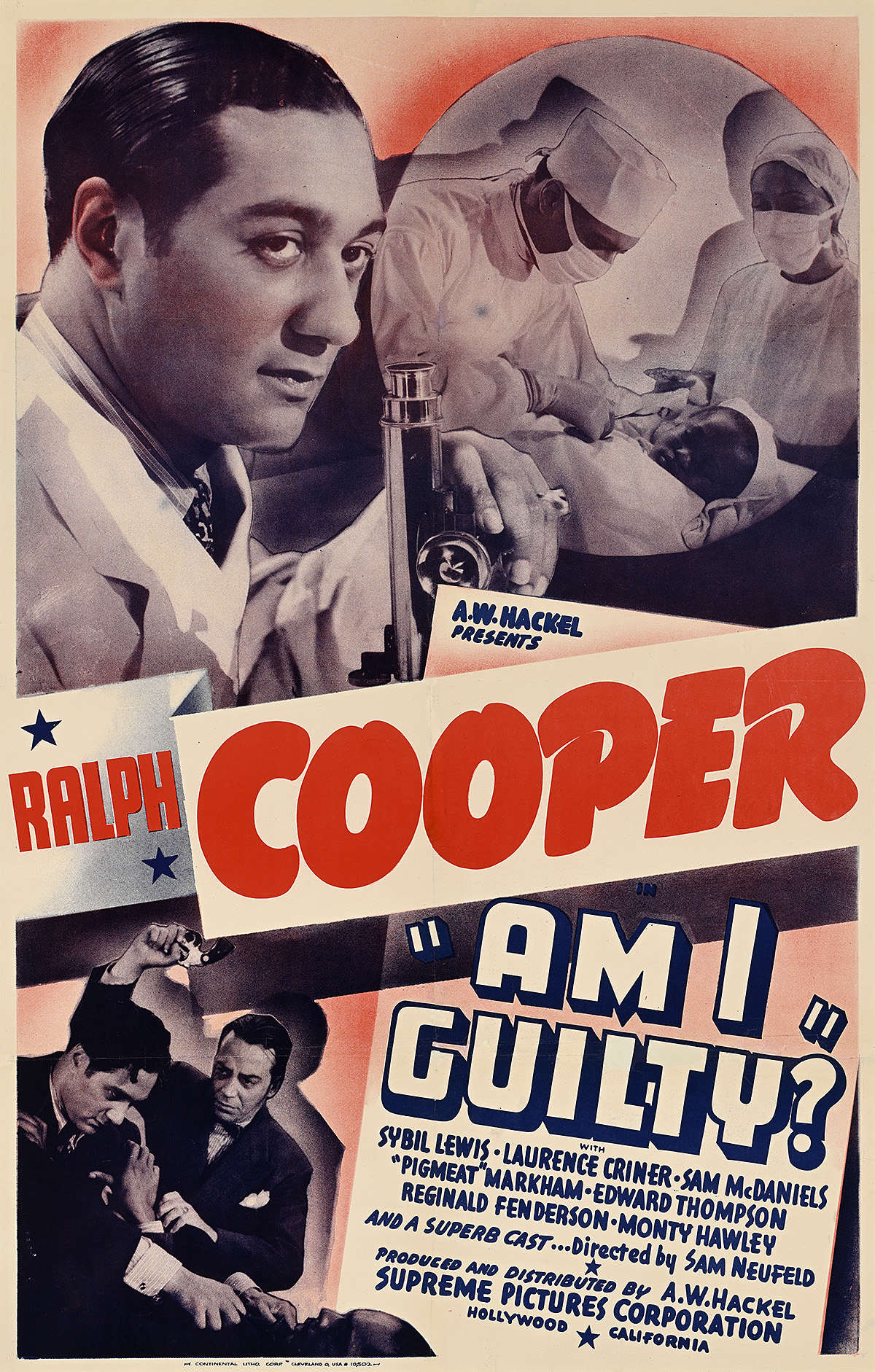
- Poster for the original 1940 theatrical release
- Directed by: Sam Newfield
- Screenplay by: Earle Snell; George Wallace Sayre
- Story by: Sherman Lowe
- Produced by: A. W. Hackel
- Starring: Ralph Cooper; Sybil Lewis; Sam McDaniel; Laurence Criner; Marcella Moreland
- Cinematography: Robert E. Cline
- Edited by: S. Roy Luby
- Production company: Supreme Pictures Corporation
- Distributed by: Sack Amusement Enterprises
- Release date: June 21, 1940
- Running time: 70 minutes
- Country: United States
- Language: English

Am I Guilty? is a 1940 American film directed by Sam Newfield for the Supreme Pictures Corporation. The film's producer A. W. Hackel, who had founded Supreme Pictures, planned a series of films featuring black casts, but Am I Guilty? was the only one to be released. The screenplay was cowritten by Earle Snell and George Wallace Sayre based on a story by Sherman Lowe.

Toddy Pictures rereleased the film as Racket Doctor in 1945. Advertisements for the film, including a lobby card, remain in existence, and a poster was appraised on an episode of the PBS show Antiques Roadshow.

The Pittsburgh Courier described a gala opening at the Apollo Theater in Harlem.

== Plot ==
Extraordinary measures are taken to help the poor as a young doctor opens a free clinic in Harlem.

== Cast ==
- Ralph Cooper as Dr. James Dunbar
- Sybil Lewis as Joan Freeman
- Sam McDaniel as John D. Jones
- Laurence Criner as "Trigger" Bennett
- Marcella Moreland as Marcella
- Monte Hawley
- Pigmeat Markham
- Reginald Fenderson
- Clarence Brooks
- Jess Lee Brooks
