= Claire Rochelle =

American actress

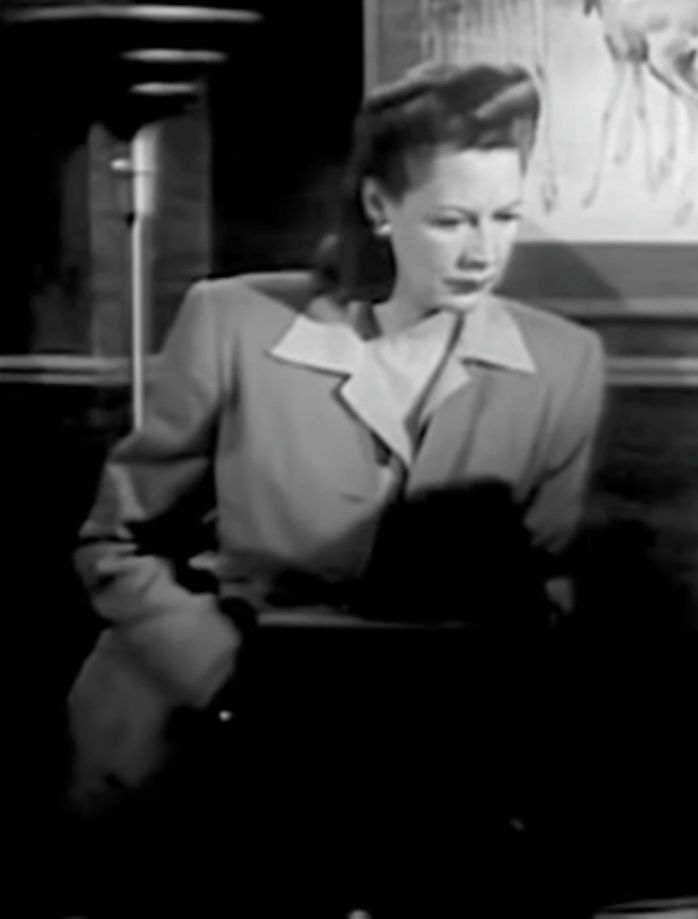
- Rochelle in Double Exposure (1944)
- Born: August 22, 1908; Kansas City, Missouri, U.S.
- Died: May 23, 1981 (aged 72); La Jolla, California, U.S.
- Occupation: Actress
- Years active: 1929–1946
- Spouse: Leo Hirsch

Claire Rochelle (August 22, 1908–May 23, 1981) was an American film actress. She played the female lead in a number of westerns and worked as a stunt woman.

Rochelle was born in Kansas City, Missouri. Her parents were Mr. and Mrs. Howard L. Frizelle.

In 1948 Rochelle and her husband, Leo Hirsch, created the United Fan Mail and Fan Club Service. By 1955 that business had 250 clients and answered more than 100,000 fan letters per month. Its clients included George Gobel, Tab Hunter, Gregory Peck, Gary Cooper, June Allyson, Jane Russell, and other celebrities.

== Selected filmography ==
- Tanned Legs (1929)
- It's Great to Be Alive (1933)
- Music in the Air (1934)
- Skybound (1935)
- I'll Name the Murderer (1936)
- Colleen (1936)
- Empty Saddles (1936)
- After the Thin Man (1936)
- Boothill Brigade (1937)
- Thanks for Listening (1937)
- Guns in the Dark (1937)
- She's Dangerous (1937)
- Ridin' the Lone Trail (1937)
- The Girl Said No (1937)
- Start Cheering (1938)
- El Diablo Rides (1939)
- Two Gun Troubador (1939)
- Should a Girl Marry? (1939)
- Code of the Fearless (1939)
- Missing Daughters (1939)
- The Pal from Texas (1939)
- Long Shot (1939)
- Riders of the Sage (1939)
- The Kid from Santa Fe (1940)
- Buzzy Rides the Range (1940)
- I Love You Again (1940)
- Lightning Strikes West (1940)
- Pot o' Gold (1941)
- North from the Lone Star (1941)
- Gallant Lady (1942)
- The Lone Rider in Texas Justice (1942)
- Secrets of a Co-Ed (1942)
- Harvest Melody (1943)
- Men on Her Mind (1944)
- Double Exposure (1944)
- Shake Hands with Murder (1944)
- Swing Hostess (1944)
- Waterfront (1944)
- Keep Your Powder Dry (1945)
- Blonde for a Day (1946)

== Bibliography ==
- Pitts, Michael R. Poverty Row Studios, 1929–1940: An Illustrated History of 55 Independent Film Companies, with a Filmography for Each. McFarland & Company, 2005.
