= Man, Woman & Marriage =

1921 film

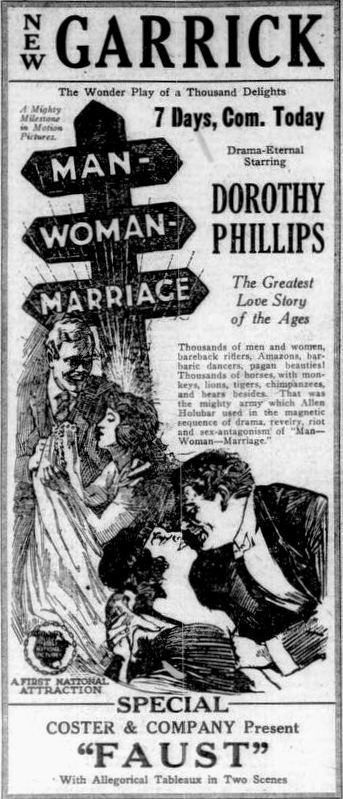
- Contemporary advertisement
- Directed by: Allen Holubar
- Written by: Olga Scholl
- Story by: Allen Holubar
- Produced by: Allen Holubar; Albert A. Kaufman
- Starring: Dorothy Phillips
- Cinematography: H. Lyman Broening; Blake Wagner; Byron Haskin
- Edited by: Viola Lawrence
- Distributed by: Associated First National Pictures
- Release date: March 27, 1921
- Running time: 90 minutes
- Country: United States
- Language: Silent (English intertitles)

Man, Woman & Marriage is a 1921 American silent drama film produced and directed by Allen Holubar and starring Dorothy Phillips. It was released through Associated First National Pictures. It is also known under the title Man-Woman-Marriage.

== Cast ==
- Dorothy Phillips as Victoria
- Ralph Lewis as The Father
- Margaret Mann as The Mother
- James Kirkwood as David Courtney
- Robert Cain as Bruce Schuyler
- J. Barney Sherry as Henshaw
- Shannon Day as Bobo
- Frances Parks as Milly
- Emily Chichester as Jerry

unbilled

- Bernice Gevurtz (uncredited)
- Robert Livingston (uncredited)
- Ramon Novarro as Dancer (uncredited)
- Derelys Perdue (uncredited)

== Production ==
The film attracted publicity in 1920, months before its release, because 160 of the extras in its battle scene filed injury reports with California's State Industrial Commission on September 14, 1920. Reportedly, nine of the participants were hospitalized after being hurt during the filming near Chatsworth, California.

== Reception ==
In his review for the first incarnation of Life, Robert E. Sherwood called the film "the world's worst movie". Sherwood described the film as "a grotesque hodgepodge about woman's rights through the ages (interminable ages they are, too) with a great deal of ham allegory and cheap religious drool, used to cloud the real motif — which is sex appeal."

== Preservation status ==
The film is preserved in the EYE Institut collection Filmmuseum, Amsterdam.

== Image gallery ==
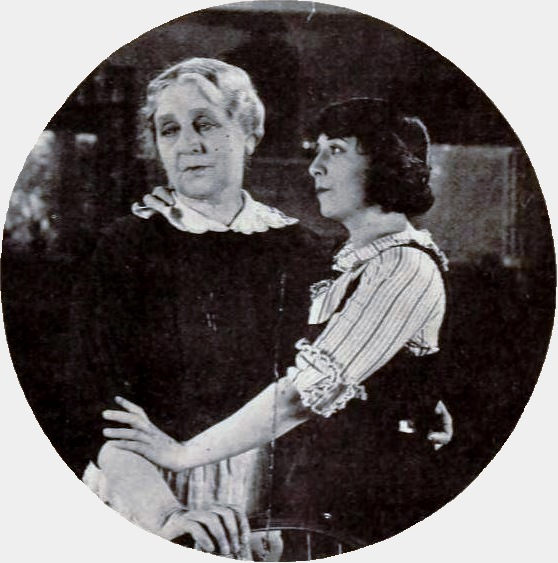
Margaret Mann and Dorothy Phillips.

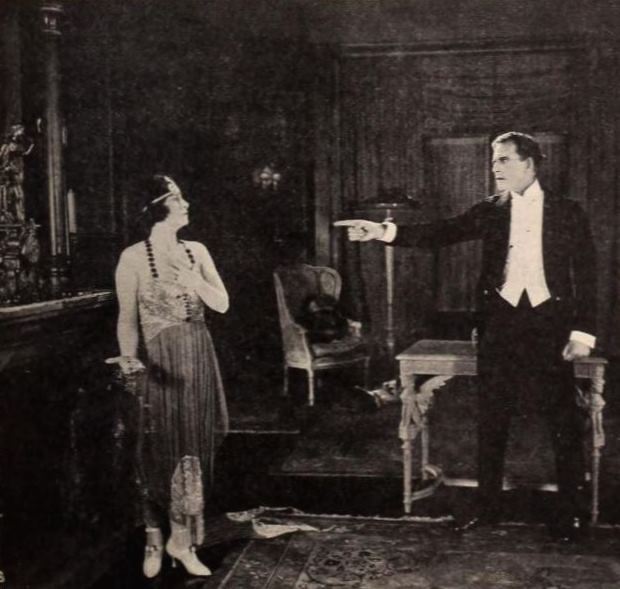
Dorothy Phillips and James Kirkwood.

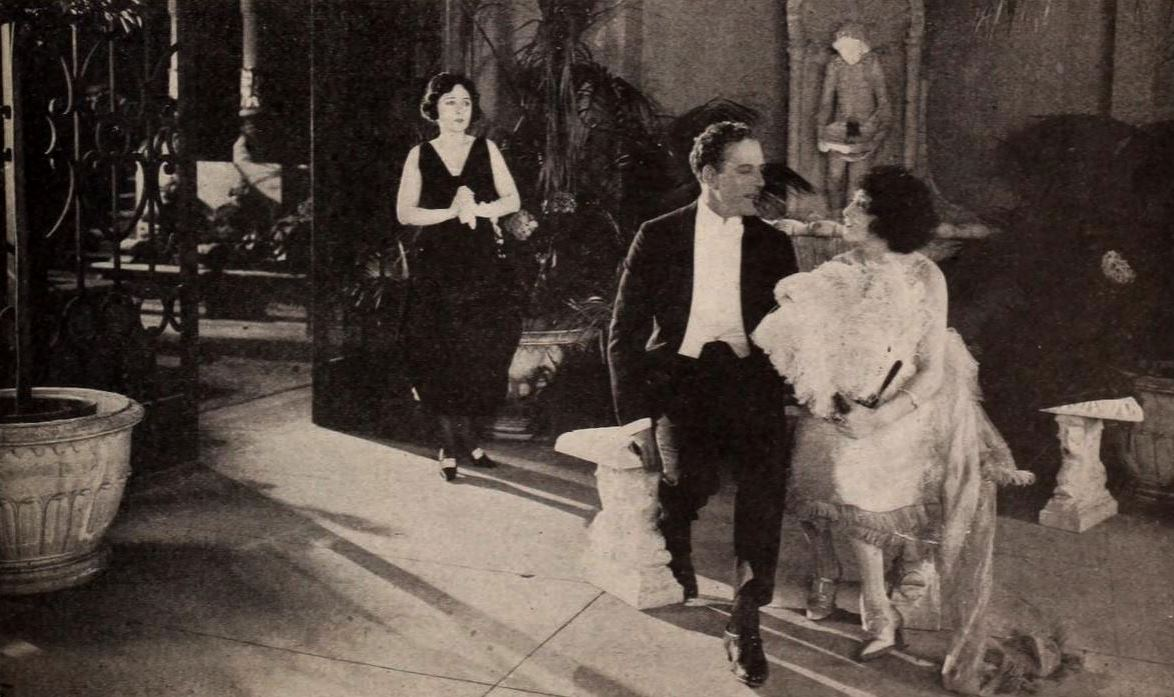
Dorothy Phillips, James Kirkwood, and unidentified actress.

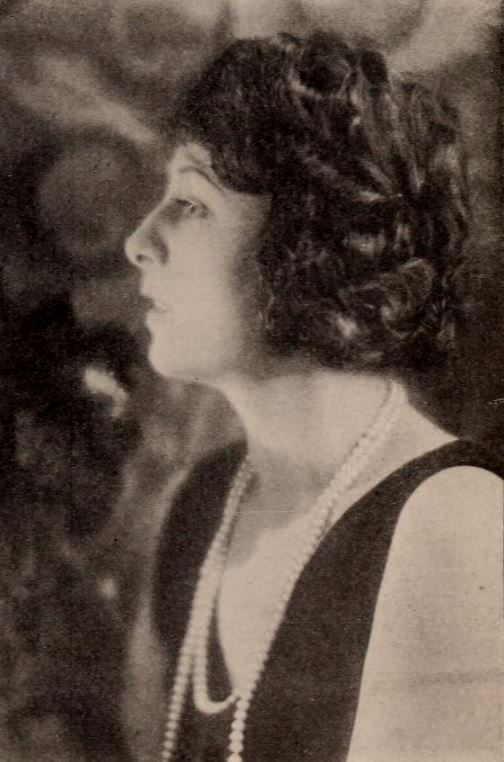
Dorothy Phillips.

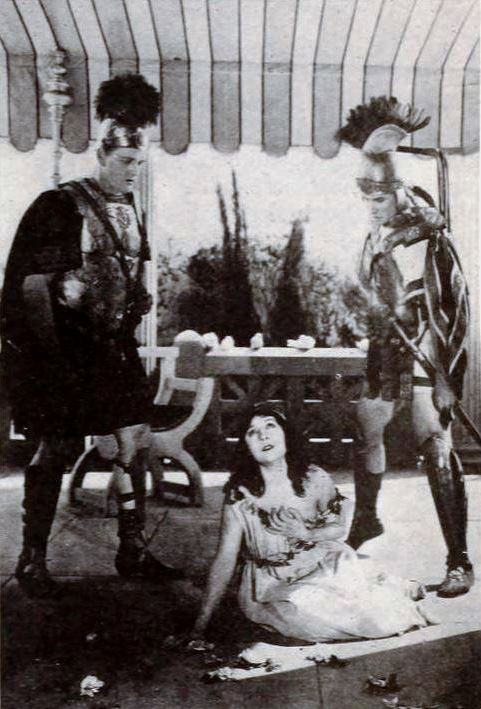
One of the historical segments involving a slave girl.

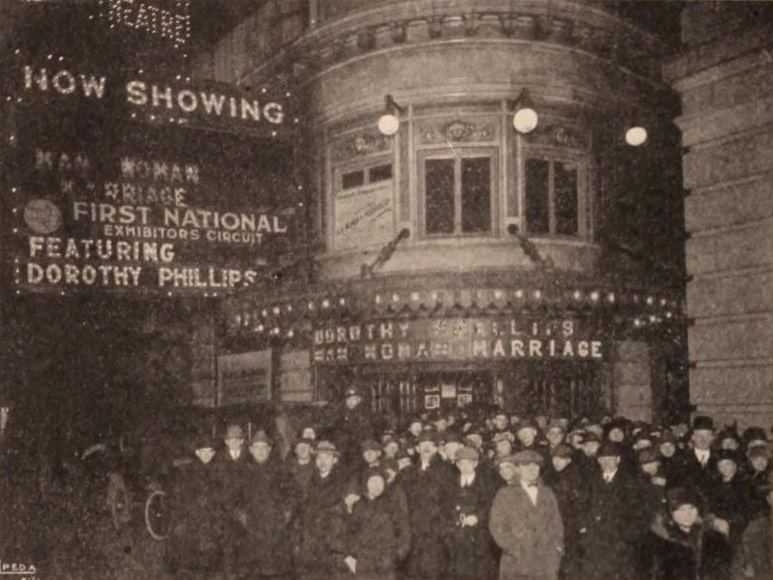
New Jersey theater showing the film.

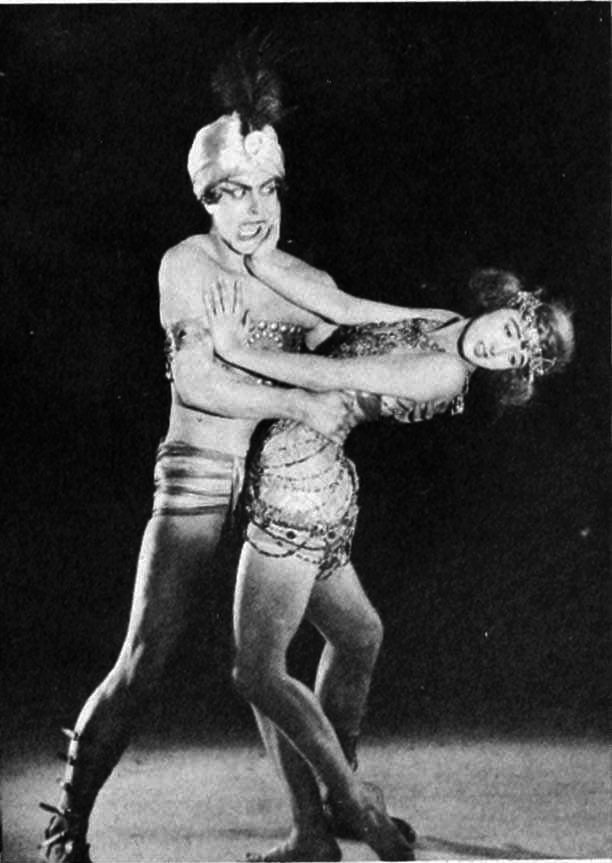
Ramon Novarro as Dancer.

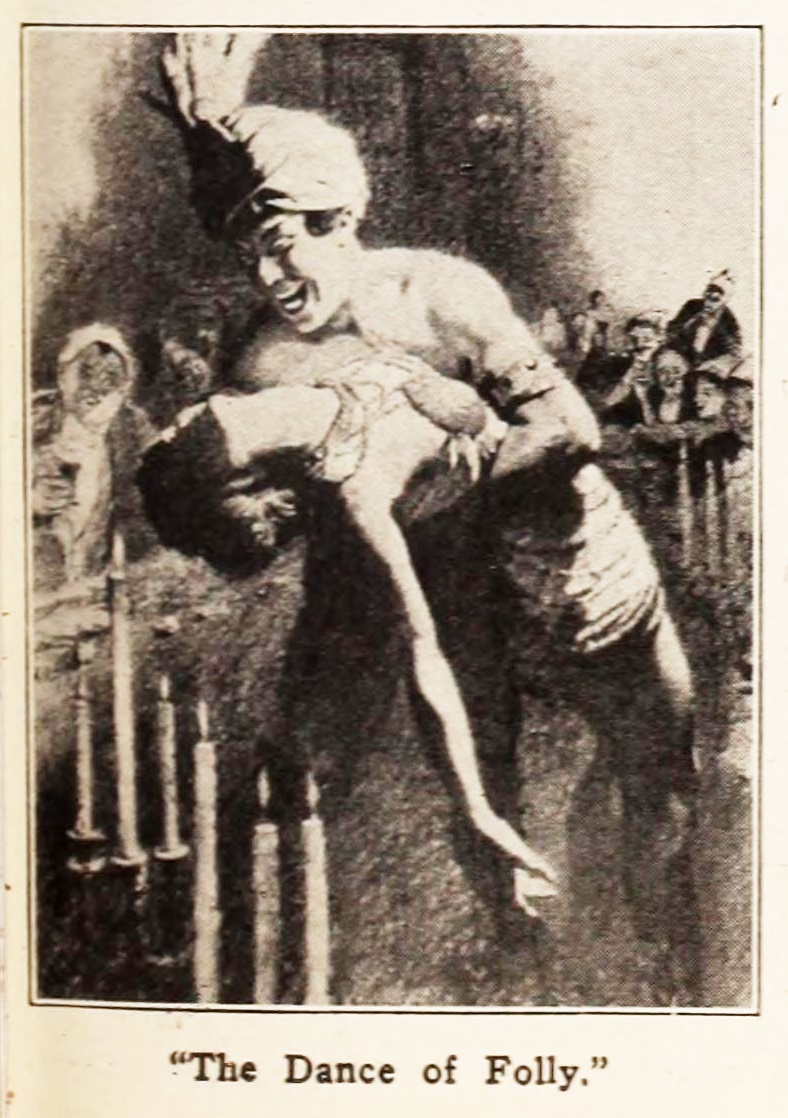
Ramon Novarro as Dancer.
