= The Smart Sex =

1921 film

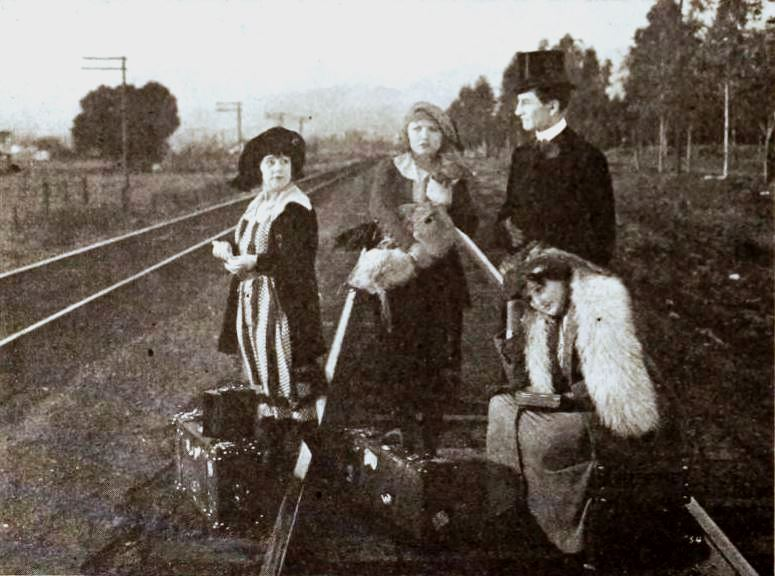
- Directed by: Fred LeRoy Granville
- Written by: Emma Bell Clifton; Doris Schroeder
- Produced by: Carl Laemmle
- Starring: Eva Novak; Frank Braidwood; Margaret Mann
- Cinematography: Leland Lancaster
- Production company: Universal Pictures
- Distributed by: Universal Pictures
- Release date: March 1921
- Running time: 50 minutes
- Country: United States
- Languages: Silent; English intertitles

The Smart Sex is a 1921 American silent comedy film directed by Fred LeRoy Granville and starring Eva Novak, Frank Braidwood and Margaret Mann.

== Cast ==
- Eva Novak as Rose
- Frank Braidwood as Guy
- Geoffrey Webb as Fred
- Mayre Hall as Edith
- C. Norman Hammond as Mr. Vaughn
- Dorothy Hagan as Mrs. Vaughn
- Calvert Carter as Mr. Haskins
- Margaret Mann as Mrs. Haskins
- Jim O'Neill as Danny
- Evelyn McCoy as Dorothy

== Bibliography ==
- Connelly, Robert B. The Silents: Silent Feature Films, 1910-36, Volume 40, Issue 2. December Press, 1998.
- Munden, Kenneth White. The American Film Institute Catalog of Motion Pictures Produced in the United States, Part 1. University of California Press, 1997.
