= The Law Rides =

1936 film

- Directed by: Robert N. Bradbury
- Written by: Al Martin (screenplay); Forbes Parkhill (story)
- Produced by: A.W. Hackel
- Starring: See below
- Cinematography: Bert Longenecker
- Edited by: Dan Milner
- Production company: Supreme Pictures
- Distributed by: Supreme Pictures
- Release date: June 25, 1936
- Running time: 57 minutes
- Country: United States
- Language: English

The Law Rides is a 1936 American Western film directed by Robert N. Bradbury.

== Cast ==
- Bob Steele as Bruce Conway
- Harley Wood as Arline Lewis
- Buck Connors as Whitey
- Charles King as Hank Davis
- Margaret Mann as Mrs. Lewis
- Jack Rockwell as Sheriff Anderson
- Norman Neilsen as Jack Lewis (prospector)
- Barney Furey as Henchman Pete

== See also ==
- Bob Steele filmography
