= Richard Gaines =

American actor (1904–1975)

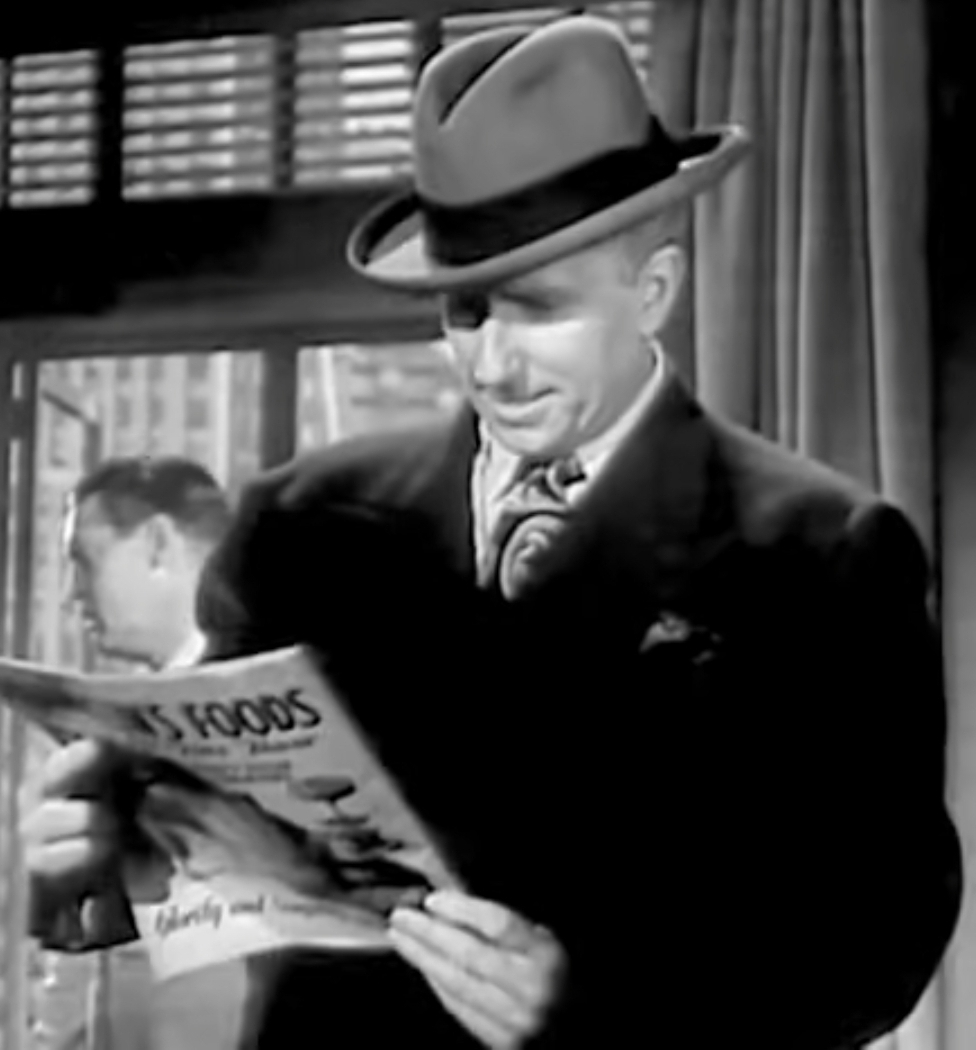
- Gaines in Double Exposure (1944)
- Born: July 23, 1904; Oklahoma City, Oklahoma, U.S.
- Died: July 20, 1975 (aged 70); North Hollywood, Los Angeles, California, U.S.
- Occupation: Actor
- Years active: 1929–1962 (secured)
- Spouse: Brenda Marshall (m. 1936; div. 1940)
- Children: 1

Richard Houston Gaines (July 23, 1904 – July 20, 1975) was an American actor. He appeared in over 75 film and television productions between 1940 and 1962.

== Early years ==
Gaines was born in Indian Territory and grew up in Texas, learning "to handle the ax, the plough, and the lariat". He enrolled at Texas Christian University when he was 16 and studied drama there. While a student there he acted in productions of little theaters in Dallas and Fort Worth.

He worked at a variety of jobs in the United States and in France before winning a scholarship to study at the American Laboratory Theatre.

== Career ==
Gaines appeared in five Broadway productions between 1929 and 1942. He served as Raymond Massey's replacement as Abraham Lincoln in the original production of Robert E. Sherwood's Abe Lincoln in Illinois (1938–1939).

In Hollywood, Gaines frequently played professional or officious types in supporting roles. He was often seen in authoritarian roles as a lawyer, doctor, supervisor or father. Gaines made his film debut as Patrick Henry in the historical drama The Howards of Virginia with Cary Grant. One of his best-known roles was as Jean Arthur's stuffy suitor Charles J. Pendergast in The More the Merrier (1943), directed by George Stevens. He also appeared as the insurance company boss of Fred MacMurray and Edward G. Robinson in the film noir classic Double Indemnity (1944). In Cecil B. DeMille's Unconquered (1947), Gaines portrayed the historical role of George Washington. He worked frequently on television during the 1950s. Between 1958 and 1961, he had a recurring role as a judge in 14 episodes of Perry Mason.

== Personal life ==
On September 30, 1936, Gaines married actress Brenda Marshall; the couple divorced in 1940. They had one daughter, Virginia, who later grew up with Marshall and her second husband William Holden after Holden subsequently adopted Virginia Gaines when the couple married in 1941. Gaines retired from Hollywood business in 1962 after a guest appearance on Alfred Hitchcock Presents, and he died in North Hollywood, Los Angeles, on July 20, 1975, three days before his 71st birthday.

== Selected filmography ==
- The Howards of Virginia (1940) – Patrick Henry
- A Night to Remember (1942) – Lingle
- The More the Merrier (1943) – Charles J. Pendergast
- Tender Comrade (1943) – Waldo Pierson (uncredited)
- Double Indemnity (1944) – Edward S. Norton Jr.
- Mr. Winkle Goes to War (1944) – Ralph Westcott
- Double Exposure (1944) – James R. Turlock
- The Enchanted Cottage (1945) – Frederick 'Freddy' Price
- Twice Blessed (1945) – Senator John Pringle
- Don Juan Quilligan (1945) – Defense Attorney
- So Goes My Love (1946) – Mr. Josephus Ford
- The Bride Wore Boots (1946) – Jeff's Attorney (uncredited)
- Do You Love Me (1946) – Ralph Wainwright
- White Tie and Tails (1946) – Archer
- Nobody Lives Forever (1946) – Charles Manning
- Humoresque (1946) – Bauer
- Brute Force (1947) – McCallum
- The Hucksters (1947) – Cooke
- Unconquered (1947) – Colonel George Washington
- Ride the Pink Horse (1947) – Jonathan
- The Invisible Wall (1947) – Richard Elsworth
- Cass Timberlane (1947) – Dennis Thane
- Dangerous Years (1947) – Edgar Burns
- That Wonderful Urge (1948) – Whitson, Farley's Executive
- Every Girl Should Be Married (1948) – Sam McNutt
- The Lucky Stiff (1949) – District Attorney John Logan
- Strange Bargain (1949) – Malcolm Jarvis
- A Kiss for Corliss (1949) – Taylor
- Key to the City (1950) – Speaker on TV Broadcast (uncredited)
- Ace in the Hole (1951) – Nagel
- Flight to Mars (1951) – Professor Jackson
- Cavalcade of America (1952–1954, TV Series) – George Washington / Dr. Hayes
- Marry Me Again (1953) – Dr. Pepperdine
- Drum Beat (1954) – Dr. Thomas
- Love Me or Leave Me (1955) – Paul Hunter
- The Petrified Forest (1955, live televised version)
- Trial (1955) – Dr. Johannes Albert Schacter
- Ransom! (1956) – Langly
- Francis in the Haunted House (1956) – D.A. Reynolds
- 5 Steps to Danger (1957) – Dean Brant
- Jeanne Eagels (1957) – Judge (uncredited)
- Perry Mason (1958–1961, TV Series) – Judge / Judge Carwell / Judge Treadwell
- The Big Fisherman (1959) – Minor Role (uncredited)
- The Donna Reed Show (1959, TV Series) – Dr. Elias Spaulding
- Alfred Hitchcock Presents (1960, TV Series) (Season 6 Episode 12: "The Baby-Blue Expression") – James Barrett
- The Great Impostor (1961) – Chairman (uncredited)
- The Outsider (1961) – Chairman (uncredited)
- Alfred Hitchcock Presents (1962, TV Series) (Season 7 Episode 16: "The Case of M.J.H.") – M.J. Harrison (final appearance)
