= El Diablo Rides =

- Theatrical release poster
- Directed by: Ira S. Webb
- Screenplay by: Carl Krusada
- Story by: Harry Gordon; Rose Gordon
- Produced by: Harry S. Webb
- Starring: Bob Steele; Claire Rochelle; Kit Guard; Carleton Young; Ted Adams; Robert Walker
- Cinematography: Edward A. Kull
- Edited by: Dan Milner
- Music by: Frank Sanucci
- Production company: Metropolitan Pictures Corporation
- Distributed by: Metropolitan Pictures Corporation
- Release date: December 12, 1939
- Running time: 57 minutes
- Country: United States
- Language: English

El Diablo Rides is a 1939 American Western film directed by Ira S. Webb and written by Carl Krusada. The film stars Bob Steele, Claire Rochelle, Kit Guard, Carleton Young, Ted Adams and Robert Walker. The film was released on December 12, 1939, by Metropolitan Pictures Corporation.

== Plot ==
Bob rides into a border town where he runs into trouble with Lambert and his gang. Herb arrests him claiming he is the outlaw El Diablo. But it was just to save him from Lambert's gang and the two now plan to trap the outlaws.

== Cast ==
- Bob Steele as Bob
- Claire Rochelle as Mary
- Kit Guard as Dan
- Carleton Young as Herb Crenshaw
- Ted Adams as Buck Lambert
- Robert Walker as Frank
- Robert Robinson as Sheriff
- Hal Carey as Saloon Singer
