= Syd Saylor =

American actor (1895–1962)

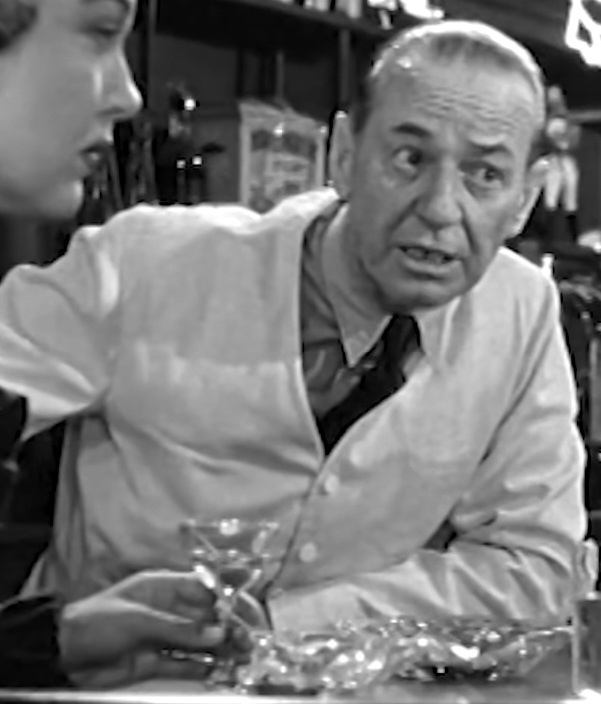
- Saylor in Woman on the Run (1950)
- Born: Leo Sailor; March 24, 1895; Chicago, Illinois, U.S.
- Died: December 21, 1962 (aged 67); Hollywood, California, U.S.
- Occupation: Actor
- Years active: 1926–1962
- Spouse: Marie Saylor (m. 1920; div. 1941)
- Children: 1

Syd Saylor (born Leo Sailor; March 24, 1895 – December 21, 1962) was an American comedic actor and movie cowboy sidekick who appeared in 395 films and television series between 1926 and 1962.

== Early years ==
Saylor was born Leo Sailor in 1895 in Chicago. He graduated from the Art Institute of Chicago and worked as an artist before venturing into acting.

== Career ==
Saylor worked as a clown in circuses and as a gymnast in vaudeville.

In the silent film days of the 1920s, he starred in a series of two-reel comedy shorts, Let George Do It, as the title character. He first appeared in feature-length films in 1926.

Saylor went on to have a prolific career as a character actor, set apart from other character actors by his protruding Adam's apple and unique comedic speaking voice. He appeared in comedies to westerns, usually as the hero's comical sidekick. He briefly appeared, sometimes unbilled, in numerous television episodes of Maverick (1957-1962), often with James Garner, always recognizable for his voice.

Saylor was also the second television "Bozo the Clown" on KTTV Ch. 11 in Hollywood, California during the early 1950s.

== Personal life and death ==
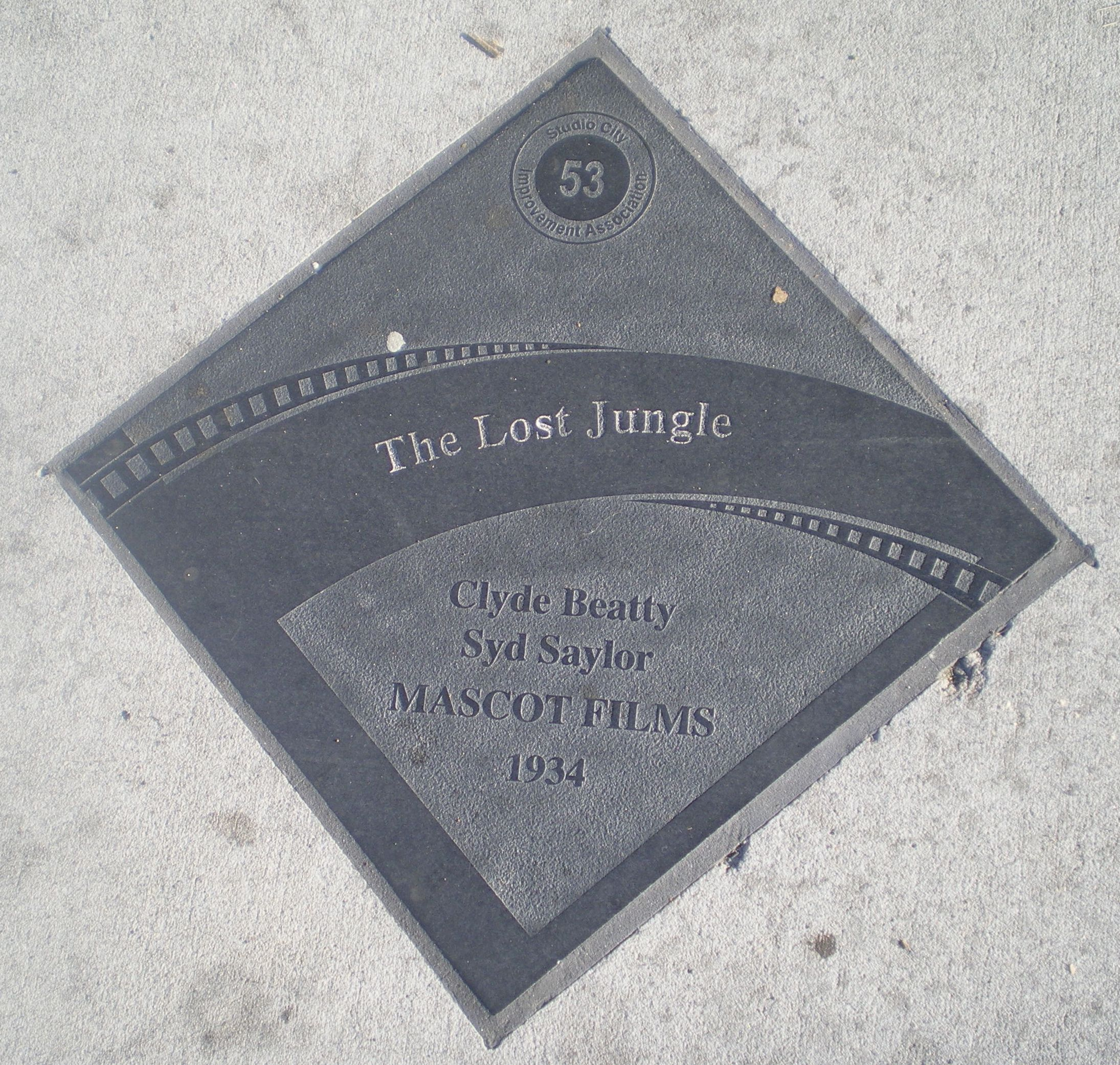
The Lost Jungle, Studio City Walk of Fame, Ventura Blvd. at Laurel Canyon, Studio City, Calif.

Saylor was married in Chicago in 1920. On September 5, 1941, his wife, Marie, obtained a divorce in Los Angeles. They had a daughter, Jeanne. He died in Hollywood in 1962, aged 67.

== Selected filmography ==
- The Winking Idol (1926) - The Tramp
- The Ridin' Rascal (1926)
- The Runaway Express (1926) - The Tramp
- Red Hot Leather (1926) - 'Noisy' Bates
- The Mystery Rider (1928)
- Just Off Broadway (1929) - Bennie Barnett
- Cat, Dog & Co. (1929, Short) - Pedestrian (uncredited)
- Shanghai Rose (1929) - Xavier Doolittle
- The Border Legion (1930)
- Playthings of Hollywood (1930)
- The Light of Western Stars (1930)
- Men Without Law (1930) - Hank
- No Limit (1931)
- I Take This Woman (1931)
- Law of the Sea (1932)
- Tangled Destinies (1932)
- Lady and Gent (1932) costarring John Wayne
- The Crusader (1932)
- The Nuisance (1933)
- Silent Men (1933)
- Transatlantic Merry-Go-Round (1934)
- Marrying Widows (1934)
- The Lost Jungle (1934)
- Mystery Mountain (1934)
- The Headline Woman (1935)
- Ladies Crave Excitement (1935)
- Streamline Express (1935)
- The Fighting Coward (1935)
- Wilderness Mail (1935)
- Kelly the Second (1936)
- Prison Shadows (1936)
- The Three Mesquiteers (1936)
- Exiled to Shanghai (1937)
- The Lady Escapes (1937)
- Guns in the Dark (1937) as Oscar
- The Wrong Road (1937)
- Abe Lincoln in Illinois (1940) - John Johnston
- A Gentleman at Heart (1942)
- The Lone Star Ranger (1942)
- That Other Woman (1942)
- Yankee Doodle Dandy (1942) - Star Boarder (uncredited)
- Doughboys in Ireland (1943)
- Tarzan's Desert Mystery (1943)
- Three of a Kind (1944) - Customer
- Ambush Trail (1946) - Sam Hawkins
- Gas House Kids Go West (1947) - Motorcycle Cop (uncredited)
- The Arkansas Swing (1948) - Sheriff Dibble
- High Noon (1952) - Old Timer on Hotel Porch (uncredited)
- The Hawk of Wild River (1952) - Yank'em Out Kennedy
- Toughest Man Alive (1955) - Proprietor
- The Crawling Hand (1963) - Soda Shop Keeper (posthumous release)
