= Brand of the Outlaws =

1936 film

- Film poster
- Directed by: Robert N. Bradbury
- Written by: Forbes Parkhill (screenplay); Forbes Parkhill (story)
- Produced by: A. W. Hackel
- Starring: Bob Steele
- Cinematography: Bert Longenecker
- Edited by: Dan Milner
- Production company: Supreme Pictures
- Release date: 1936
- Running time: 60 minutes
- Country: United States
- Language: English

Brand of the Outlaws is a 1936 American Western film directed by Robert N. Bradbury for A. W. Hackel's Supreme Pictures.

== Plot ==
A Sheriff and his posse split up to pursue a group of rustlers. Seeing the sheriff alone, the gang shoots him, leaving him for dead. He's found by drifter Gary Grey who treats his wound and takes him to medical attention in town. With his business done Gray leaves and sees the rustler's placing their brand on their stolen cattle. Believing them to be ranch hands, Gary asks them for a job, that their leader Rufe Matlock obliges. When the posse catches up with them, they escape leaving Gray. Deputy Ben Holt decides to handcuff, then brand Gray.

The Sheriff fires Holt for his cruelty, but Holt is actually a member of the gang of rustlers.

== Cast ==
- Bob Steele as Gary Gray
- Margaret Marquis as Verna Matlock
- Jack Rockwell as Deputy Ben Holt
- Charles King as Rufe Matlock
- Virginia True Boardman as Mrs. Matlock, Verna's Mother
- Ed Cassidy as The Sheriff
- Frank Ball as The Doctor
