= Once to Every Woman (1920 film) =

1920 film by Allen Holubar

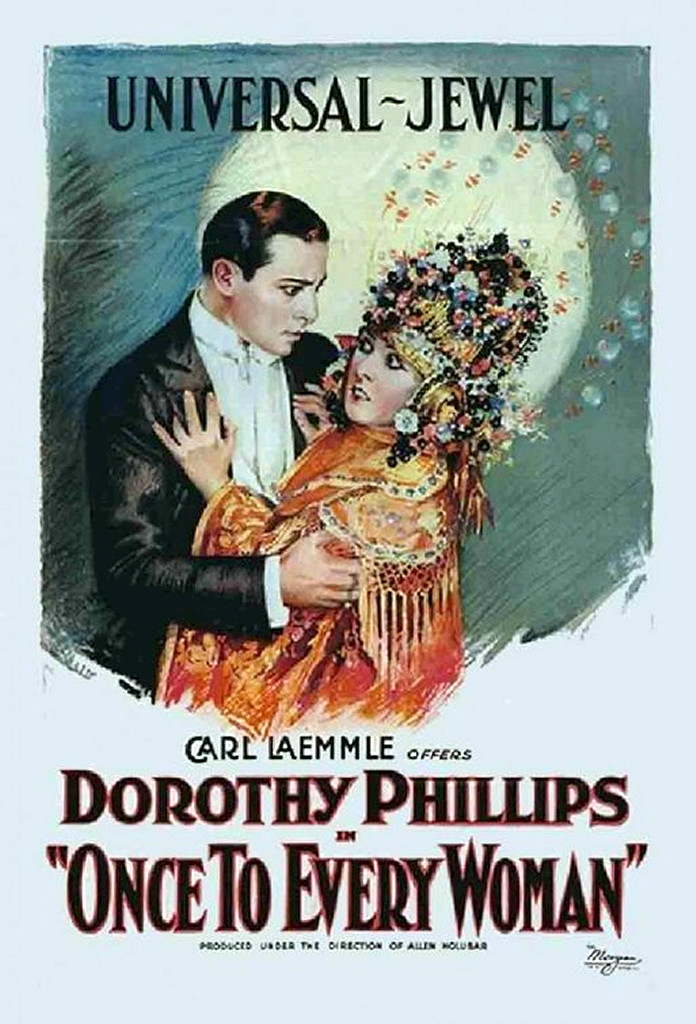
- Film poster
- Directed by: Allen Holubar
- Written by: Allen Holubar; Olga Scholl
- Story by: Allen Holubar
- Starring: Dorothy Phillips
- Cinematography: Fred LeRoy Granville
- Edited by: Viola Lawrence
- Production company: Jewel Production
- Distributed by: Universal Film Manufacturing Company
- Release date: September 6, 1920
- Running time: 6 reels
- Country: United States
- Language: Silent (English intertitles)

Once to Every Woman is a 1920 American silent drama film starring Dorothy Phillips, directed by Allen Holubar and released by Universal Pictures under the name Jewel Production. Supporting actors include Margaret Mann and a then-unknown Rudolph Valentino. It was re-released in 1922 after Valentino's increased popularity. It is now a lost film.

== Plot ==
As described in a film magazine, under the patronage of Mrs. Thorndyke, who recognizes that her protege has a voice, selfish and pampered Aurora Meredith leaves her family and rustic lover Phineas Schudder in the little village of Pleasanton to take up a singing career. After three years of study in Italy her patroness dies so Aurora, without funds to pay for her last year of study, accepts aid from an Italian youth, Juliantimo. After her first triumph he threatens to kill himself if she refuses to marry him, so to avoid him Aurora accepts an offer to appear in New York City. There she meets the Duke of Devonshire who, in an effort to extract a promise of marriage, arranges for Aurora to be given the stellar role in a new opera. On the night of the opera's premiere Juliantimo appears at the theater and demands Aurora as his wife in payment of his loan. She refuses and orders him out of her dressing room, and he returns to his box seat. Phineas Schudder is in the theater as is the Duke of Devonshire. Toward the close of the opera Aurora sees Juliantimo draw a gun. Just before the fall of the curtain he fires a shot at her and misses, and then turns the weapon on himself. When Aurora recovers from her fright she discovers that she has lost her voice. Doctors tell her that she will never sing again. At once her friends leave her until there is no one left, not even the Duke or her maid. She then realizes the falsity of fame without love. Phineas, who has become a successful poet, vainly tries to see her. Broken-hearted and discouraged, she returns to the welcoming arms of her family and Phineas. Her mother is stricken ill and begs for her to sing to her. In her sorrow, Aurora suddenly recovers her voice, which her mother hears for the last time. Although Aurora can sing once again, she remains in Pleasanton. She has learned the happiness of helping and giving, and before she begins teaching children she pledges her troth with Phineas, obtaining the love that every woman wants.

== Cast ==
- Dorothy Phillips as Aurora Meredith
- Margaret Mann as Mother Meredith
- William Ellingford as Matthew Meredith
- Emily Chichester as Patience Meredith
- Frank Elliott as the Duke of Devonshire
- Elinor Field as Virginia Meredith
- Robert Anderson as Phineas Schudder
- Mary Wise as Mrs. Thorndyke
- Rudolph Valentino as Juliantimo
- Rosa Gore as Mrs. Chichester Jones
- Dan Crimmins as Mr. Chichester Jones
