= The Heart of Humanity =

1918 film by Allen Holubar

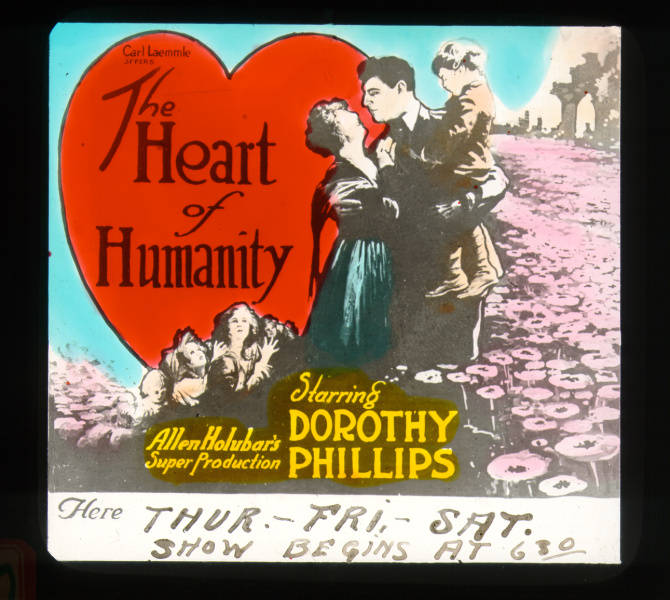
- Lantern slide
- Directed by: Allen Holubar
- Screenplay by: Allen Holubar; Olga Scholl
- Story by: Allen Holubar; Olga Scholl
- Produced by: Carl Laemmle
- Starring: Dorothy Phillips; William Stowell; Erich von Stroheim
- Cinematography: Fred LeRoy Granville
- Edited by: Frank Lawrence
- Production company: A Jewel Production
- Distributed by: Universal Pictures
- Release dates: December 22, 1918 (New York City); February 15, 1919 (United States)
- Running time: 110 minutes
- Country: United States
- Languages: Silent; English intertitles

The Heart of Humanity is a 1918 American silent war propaganda film produced by Universal Pictures and directed by Allen Holubar. The film stars Dorothy Phillips, William Stowell, and Erich von Stroheim.

== Overview ==
The film "follows the general theme and construction of the D. W. Griffith film Hearts of the World and, in places, parallels [its] plot". The film was made toward the end of World War I and is known for showcasing von Stroheim as a lecherous 'Hun'.

== Cast ==
- Dorothy Phillips - Nanette
- William Stowell - John Patricia
- Robert Anderson - Paul Patricia
- Walt Whitman - Father Michael
- Margaret Mann - Widow Patricia
- Erich von Stroheim - Eric von Eberhard
- Lloyd Hughes - Jules Patricia
- Frank Braidwood - Maurice Patricia
- George Hackathorne - Louis Patricia
- Pat O'Malley - Clancy
- William Welsh - Prussian Officer
- Lieutenant Smith - Canadian Officer
- Joseph W. Girard - Canadian Colonel
- Valerie Germonprez - Red Cross Ambulance driver
- Gloria Joy
- Tom London (billed as Leonard Clapham)

== Plot ==
The Heart of Humanity (1918)

Nanette (Dorothy Phillips), an American girl living in a small Canadian village, is in love with John Patricia (William Stowell), the eldest of five brothers. The war interrupts their romantic idyll, as everyone goes overseas to Belgium and France. Nanette becomes a Red Cross nurse and is terrorized by the evil Prussian Lt. von Eberhard (Erich von Stroheim). It is up to John to save her from the Hun's advances.

== Reception ==
The New York Times criticized the "theatricalities and sentimental artificialities of his plot" but characterized "some of [Holubar]'s battle panoramas [as] among the most comprehensive and vivid ever reproduced on the screen." It pointed out that "children add to the charm and effectiveness of some of the scenes, and their costumes and acting reveal that intelligence and care in direction elsewhere evident in the production. One receives the impression, however, that the making of a few of the scenes in which the children appear was not very good for the children."

== Preservation status ==
A copy of the film is preserved at the EmGee Film Library and in private collections. It was exhibited at the Museum of Modern Art in 2014.
