= The Kid Ranger =

1936 film

- Directed by: Robert North Bradbury
- Written by: Robert North Bradbury
- Produced by: A. W. Hackel
- Starring: Bob Steele
- Production company: Supreme Pictures
- Release date: February 5, 1936
- Running time: 57 minutes
- Country: United States
- Language: English

The Kid Ranger is a 1936 American Western film starring Bob Steele. It was done for Supreme Pictures and was produced by A. W. Hackel.

== Cast ==
- Bob Steele as Ray Burton
- William Farnum as Bill Mason
- Joan Barclay as Mary Brokaw
- Earl Dwire as Steve Brent
