= Ambush Trail =

1946 film

- Theatrical release poster
- Directed by: Harry L. Fraser
- Screenplay by: Elmer Clifton
- Produced by: Arthur Alexander
- Starring: Bob Steele; Syd Saylor; I. Stanford Jolley; Lorraine Miller; Charles King; John Cason; Budd Buster
- Cinematography: Jack Greenhalgh
- Edited by: Roy Livingston
- Production company: Producers Releasing Corporation
- Distributed by: Producers Releasing Corporation
- Release date: February 17, 1946
- Running time: 60 minutes
- Country: United States
- Language: English

Ambush Trail is a 1946 American Western film directed by Harry L. Fraser and written by Elmer Clifton. The film stars Bob Steele, Syd Saylor, I. Stanford Jolley, Lorraine Miller, Charles King, John Cason and Budd Buster. The film was released on February 17, 1946, by Producers Releasing Corporation.

== Cast ==
- Bob Steele as Curley Thompson
- Syd Saylor as Sam Hawkins
- I. Stanford Jolley as Hatch Bolton
- Lorraine Miller as Alice Rhodes
- Charles King as Al Craig
- John Cason as Ed Blaine
- Budd Buster as Jim Haley
- Kermit Maynard as Walter Gordon
- Frank Ellis as Owens
- Ed Cassidy as Marshal Dawes
