= Undercover Man (1936 film) =

1936 film by Albert Ray

- Theatrical release poster
- Directed by: Albert Ray
- Screenplay by: Andrew Bennison
- Story by: Andrew Bennison
- Produced by: A. W. Hackel
- Starring: Johnny Mack Brown; Suzanne Kaaren; Ted Adams; Frank Darien; Horace Murphy; Lloyd Ingraham
- Cinematography: Jack Greenhalgh
- Edited by: Dan Milner
- Production company: Supreme Pictures Corporation
- Distributed by: Republic Pictures
- Release date: September 24, 1936
- Running time: 57 minutes
- Country: United States
- Language: English

Undercover Man is a 1936 American Western film directed by Albert Ray, written by Andrew Bennison, and starring Johnny Mack Brown, Suzanne Kaaren, Ted Adams, Frank Darien, Horace Murphy and Lloyd Ingraham. It was released on September 24, 1936, by Republic Pictures.

== Cast ==
- Johnny Mack Brown as Steve McLain
- Suzanne Kaaren as Linda Forbes
- Ted Adams as Ace Pringle
- Frank Darien as Dizzy Slocum
- Horace Murphy as Sheriff
- Lloyd Ingraham as Judge Forbes
- Dick Morehead as Deputy Rusty
- Ed Cassidy as Henchman Slim
