= Supreme Pictures Corporation =

1930s US film studio

Supreme Pictures Corporation was a film production company in the United States. It produced dozens of Western genre films. It was run by Sam Katzman and A. W. Hackel.

A. W. Hackel's Supreme Pictures, should not be confused with Alfred T. Mannon's Supreme Features, Inc., Ltd. and Resolute Pictures.

It made Westerns starring Johnny Mack Brown as well as Bob Steele.

The company also produced the film Am I Guilty? starring Ralph Cooper and an African American cast.

== Filmography ==
- The Crooked Trail (1936)
- The Kid Ranger (1936)
- Last of the Warrens (1936)
- Rogue of the Range (1936)
- Brand of the Outlaws (1936)
- Undercover Man (1936)
- Am I Guilty? (1940)
