= A. W. Hackel =

American film producer

- Born: December 18, 1882; Austria
- Died: October 22, 1959 (aged 76); Los Angeles
- Other name: A. William Hackel

A. W. Hackel, born Aaron William Hackel (December 18, 1882 – October 22, 1959), was an American film producer who founded Supreme Pictures in 1934.

== Biography ==
In 1934, Hackel formed Supreme Pictures, at which he contracted Bob Steele for 32 of his Westerns, such as Alias John Law (1935). Hackel also produced 16 Westerns with Johnny Mack Brown.

In 1936, Republic Pictures needed more Westerns and struck a deal with Hackel, who released his films through Republic. After the demise of Supreme Pictures in 1942, Hackel released his films through Monogram Pictures. All of his films were Westerns until Am I Guilty? (1940), a race film. He followed that film with numerous crime dramas, including The Flaming Urge (1953).

== Partial filmography ==
- The Brand of Hate (1934)
- Alias John Law (1935)
- Trail of Terror (1935)
- Between Men (1935)
- The Courageous Avenger (1935)
- Branded a Coward (1935)
- The Kid Ranger (1936)
- Everyman's Law (1936)
- Rogue of the Range (1936)
- The Law Rides (1936)
- The Gun Ranger (1936)
- Doomed at Sundown (1937)
- The Gambling Terror (1937)
- Desert Patrol (1938)
- Am I Guilty? (1940)
- Murder by Invitation (1941)
- Phantom Killer (1942)
- The Living Ghost (1942)
- A Gentle Gangster (1943)
- Shadow of Suspicion (1944)
- The Flaming Urge (1953)
