= Tex Palmer =

American film and television actor (1904–1982)

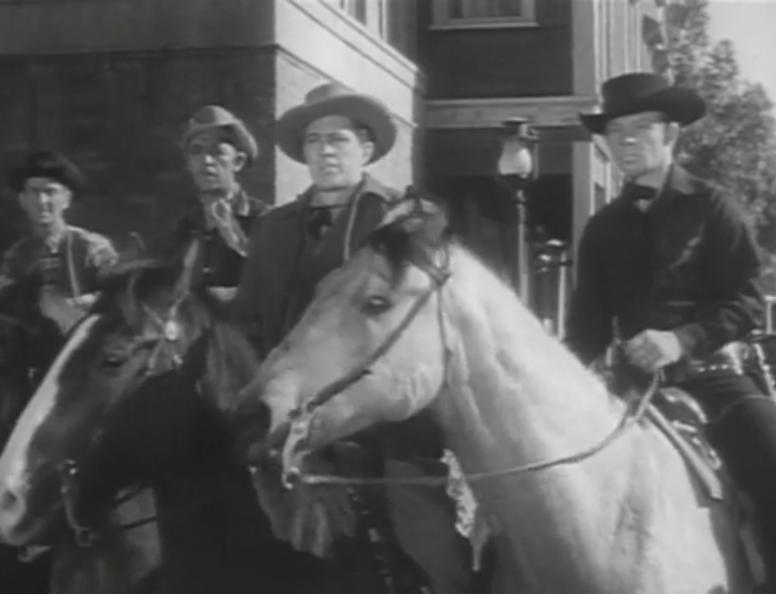
- Palmer (left) with Hal Hopper, Don Haggerty and William Murphy in 26 Men, 1957
- Born: Luther Palmer; July 31, 1904; Xenia, Ohio, U.S.
- Died: March 22, 1982 (aged 77)
- Occupations: Film and television actor
- Years active: 1929–1962
- Spouse: Francine Lassalle (m. 1936; died. 1971)
- Children: 1

Luther Palmer (July 31, 1904 – March 22, 1982) was an American film and television actor. He appeared in over 300 films and television programs between 1929 and 1962.

Palmer died on March 22, 1982, at the age of 77.

== Partial filmography ==
- Ridin' Leather (1929)
- Trailing Trouble (1930) - Henchman
- Half Pint Polly (1930)
- Near the Rainbow's End (1930)
- Canyon Hawks (1930)
- The Land of Missing Men (1930)
- West of Cheyenne (1931)
- Not Exactly Gentlemen (1931)
- Texas Cyclone (1932)
- Spirit of the West (1932)
- The Riding Tornado (1932)
- Mason of the Mounted (1932)
- Law of the North (1932)
- Son of Oklahoma (1932)
- Broadway to Cheyenne (1932)
- Come On Danger! (1932)
- Outlaw Justice (1932)
- Between Fighting Men (1932)
- Young Blood (1932)
- Renegades of the West (1932)
- Lucky Larrigan (1932)
- The Fighting Champ (1932)
- Crashin' Broadway (1932)
- Drum Taps (1933)
- Diamond Trail (1933)
- Fighting Texans (1933)
- Rainbow Ranch (1933)
- The Fighting Parson (1933)
- Galloping Romeo (1933)
- Riders of Destiny (1933)
- Sagebrush Trail (1933)
- The Whirlwind Rider (1934)
- The Lucky Texan (1934)
- West of the Divide (1934)
- Nevada Cyclone (1934)
- The Border Menacee (1934)
- The Man from Utah (1934)
- Randy Rides Alone (1934)
- Fighting Hero (1934)
- The Star Packer (1934)
- Ridin' Gents (1934)
- The Trail Beyond (1934)
- Gunfire (1934)
- Girl Trouble (1934)
- Big Boy Rides Again (1935)
- Texas Terror (1935)
- Coyote Trails (1935)
- Wolf Riders (1935)
- The Outlaw Tamer (1935)
- Rainbow Valley (1935)
- The Phantom Cowboy (1935)
- The Pecos Kid (1935)
- Born to Battle (1935)
- Smokey Smith (1935)
- Wagon Trail (1935)
- The Desert Trail (1935)
- Rustler's Paradise (1935)
- Silent Valley (1935)
- Toll of the Desert (1935)
- The Silver Bullet (1935)
- The Dawn Rider (1935)
- Paradise Canyon (1935)
- Westward Ho (1935)
- Powdersmoke Range (1935)
- The Rider of the Law (1935)
- The New Frontier (1935)
- Lawless Range (1935)
- The Last of the Clintons (1935)
- Gallant Defender (1935)
- The Law of the 45's (1935)
- The Irish Gringo (1935)
- Lawless Riders (1935)
- Trigger Tom (1935)
- The Lawless Nineties (1936)
- Wildcat Saunders (1936)
- King of the Pecos (1936)
- Desert Phantom (1936)
- Heroes of the Range (1936)
- Rogue of the Range (1936)
- Desert Justice (1936)
- Last of the Warrens (1936)
- Pinto Rustlers (1936)
- The Fugitive Sheriff (1936)
- Everyman's Law (1936)
- The Law Rides (1936)
- The Crooked Trail (1936)
- Santa Fe Bound (1936)
- The Unknown Ranger (1936)
- The Sunday Round-Up (1936)
- California Mail (1936)
- The Gun Ranger (1936)
- Headin' for the Rio Grande (1936)
- Ranger Courage (1937)
- Arizona Days (1937)
- The Gambling Terror (1937)
- Hit the Saddle (1937)
- Trouble in Texas (1937)
- Lightnin' Crandall (1937)
- Trail of Vengeance (1937)
- Bar-Z Bad Men (1937)
- Law of the Ranger (1937)
- Guns in the Dark (1937)
- Gun Lords of Stirrup Basin (1937)
- Sing, Cowboy, Sing (1937)
- Reckless Ranger (1937)
- The Painted Stallion (1937)
- A Lawman Is Born (1937)
- Range Defenders (1937)
- Riders of the Rockies (1937)
- Doomed at Sundown (1937)
- Riders of the Dawn (1937)
- The Red Rope (1937)
- Boothill Brigade (1937)
- The Mystery of the Hooded Horsemen (1937)
- The Rangers Step In (1937)
- Trailin' Trouble (1937)
- God's Country and the Man (1937)
- Stars Over Arizona (1937)
- Arizona Gunfighter (1937)
- Moonlight on the Range (1937)
- Where Trails Divide (1937)
- Roll Along, Cowboy (1937)
- Danger Valley (1937)
- Tex Rides with the Boy Scouts (1937)
- The Fighting Deputy (1937)
- Romance of the Rockies (1937)
- The Singing Outlaw (1938)
- The Rangers' Round-Up (1938)
- Where the West Begins (1938)
- The Painted Trail (1938)
- Frontier Town (1938)
- Thunder in the Desert (1938)
- Rolling Caravans (1938)
- Knight of the Plains (1938)
- The Last Stand (1938)
- Code of the Rangers (1938)
- The Feud Maker (1938)
- Western Trails (1938)
- Desert Patrol (1938)
- Border G-Man (1938)
- Outlaw Express (1938)
- The Great Adventures of Wild Bill Hickok (1938)
- Man's Country (1938)
- Pioneer Trail (1938)
- The Utah Trail (1938)
- Pals of the Saddle (1938)
- Phantom Gold (1938)
- Starlight Over Texas (1938)
- The Mexicali Kid (1938)
- Black Bandit (1938)
- Where the Buffalo Roam (1938)
- Guilty Trails (1938)
- Prairie Justice (1938)
- Gun Packer (1938)
- California Frontier (1938)
- Ghost Town Riders (1938)
- Wild Horse Canyon (1938)
- Honor of the West (1939)
- Frontiers of '49 (1939)
- In Old Montana (1939)
- The Phantom Stage (1939)
- The Lone Ranger Rides Again (1939)
- Code of the Cactus (1939)
- Rollin' Westward (1939)
- Lone Star Pioneers (1939)
- The Law Comes to Texas (1939)
- Mesquite Buckaroo (1939)
- Overland with Kit Carson (1939)
- Riders of the Frontier (1939)
- Oklahoma Terror (1939)
- The Fighting Renegade (1939)
- Trigger Fingers (1939)
- The Pal from Texas (1939)
- Flaming Lead (1939)
- El Diablo Rides (1939)
- The Cheyenne Kid (1940)
- Rhythm of the Rio Grande (1940)
- Covered Wagon Days (1940)
- The Cowboy from Sundown (1940)
- The Kid from Santa Fe (1940)
- Lightning Strikes West (1940)
- Wild Horse Range (1940)
- Winners of the West (1940)
- The Golden Trail (1940)
- Stagecoach War (1940)
- Deadwood Dick (1940)
- Rainbow Over the Range (1940)
- Colorado (1940)
- Under Texas Skies (1940)
- Billy the Kid in Texas (1940)
- Trailing Double Trouble (1940)
- Riders of Black Mountain (1940)
- Billy the Kid's Gun Justice (1940)
- Riders from Nowhere (1940)
- The Lone Rider Rides On (1941)
- Billy the Kid's Range War (1941)
- White Eagle (1941)
- The Kid's Last Ride (1941)
- Two Gun Sheriff (1941)
- Tumbledown Ranch in Arizona (1941)
- The Pioneers (1941)
- The Lone Rider in Ghost Town (1941)
- Wrangler's Roost (1941)
- Riders of Death Valley (1941)
- Billy the Kid in Santa Fe (1941)
- The Texas Marshal (1941)
- Rawhide Rangers (1941)
- The Lone Rider in Frontier Fury (1941)
- The Lone Rider Ambushed (1941)
- Saddle Mountain Roundup (1941)
- The Gunman from Bodie (1941)
- Death Valley Outlaws (1941)
- Tonto Basin Outlaws (1941)
- The Lone Rider Fights Back (1941)
- Arizona Cyclone (1941)
- Underground Rustlers (1941)
- Lone Star Law Men (1941)
- Fighting Bill Fargo (1941)
- Billy the Kid's Round-Up (1941)
- Forbidden Trails (1941)
- Texas Man Hunt (1942)
- Thunder River Feud (1942)
- The Lone Rider and the Bandit (1942)
- Below the Border (1942)
- Western Mail (1942)
- Ride 'Em Cowboy (1942)
- Raiders of the West (1942)
- Rock River Renegades (1942)
- Arizona Roundup (1942)
- The Lone Rider in Cheyenne (1942)
- North of the Rockies (1942)
- Westward Ho (1942)
- Rolling Down the Great Divide (1942)
- Boot Hill Bandits (1942)
- Where Trails End (1942)
- Billy the Kid's Smoking Guns (1942)
- Down Texas Way (1942)
- Perils of the Royal Mounted (1942)
- Tumbleweed Trail (1942)
- Prairie Pals (1942)
- Overland Mail (1942)
- West of the Law (1942)
- Along the Sundown Trail (1942)
- Overland Stagecoach (1942)
- Texas to Bataan (1942)
- Silver Queen (1942)
- Outlaws of Boulder Pass (1942)
- Trail Riders (1942)
- Two Fisted Justice (1943)
- Haunted Ranch (1943)
- Land of Hunted Men (1943)
- Wild Horse Stampede (1943)
- Death Rides the Plains (1943)
- The Avenging Rider (1943)
- Six Gun Gospel (1943)
- Black Market Rustlers (1943)
- Blazing Frontier (1943)
- Silver City Raiders (1943)
- Outlaw Trail (1944)
- Range Law (1944)
- Marked Trails (1944)
- West of the Rio Grande (1944)
- Oath of Vengeance (1944)
- The Return of the Durango Kid (1945)
- Both Barrels Blazing (1945)
- Texas Panhandle (film) (1945)
- Rustler's Round-Up (1946)
- The Michigan Kid (1947)
- Law of the Lash (1947)
- King of the Wild Horses (1947)
- Yankee Fakir (1947)
- The Vigilante (1947)
- Gunfighters (1947)
- Jesse James Rides Again (1947)
- Riders of the Lone Star (1947)
- Return of the Lash (1947)
- Buckaroo from Powder River (1947)
- Black Hills (1947)
- Song of the Drifter (1948)
- The Hawk of Powder River (1948)
- The Tioga Kid (1948)
- Law of the Panhandle (1950)
- Man from the Black Hills (1952)
- Born to the Saddle (1953)
- Jack Slade (1953)
- Masterson of Kansas (1954)
- The Broken Star (1956)
- Outlaw's Son (1957)
- The Parson and the Outlaw (1957)
- Black Patch (1957)
- Ride Out for Revenge (1957)
- Thunder in the Sun (1959)
