= Drifting Westward =

- Theatrical release poster
- Directed by: Robert F. Hill
- Screenplay by: Robert Emmett Tansey
- Produced by: Scott R. Dunlap
- Starring: Jack Randall; Frank Yaconelli; Edna Duran; Julian Rivero; Stanley Blystone; Octavio Giraud
- Cinematography: Bert Longenecker
- Edited by: Howard Dillinger
- Production company: Monogram Pictures
- Distributed by: Monogram Pictures
- Release date: January 25, 1939
- Running time: 58 minutes
- Country: United States
- Language: English

Drifting Westward is a 1939 American Western film directed by Robert F. Hill and written by Robert Emmett Tansey. The film stars Jack Randall, Frank Yaconelli, Edna Duran, Julian Rivero, Stanley Blystone and Octavio Giraud. The film was released on January 25, 1939, by Monogram Pictures.

== Cast ==
- Jack Randall as Jack Martin
- Frank Yaconelli as Lopez
- Edna Duran as Wanda Careta
- Julian Rivero as Don Careta
- Stanley Blystone as Carga
- Octavio Giraud as Manuel
- Dave O'Brien as Trigger
- James Sheridan as Piute
- Carmen Bailey as Nicki
- Monte Rawlins as Red
- Rosa Turich as Housekeeper
