= The Mexicali Kid =

- Theatrical release poster
- Directed by: Wallace Fox
- Screenplay by: Robert Emmett Tansey
- Produced by: Robert Emmett Tansey
- Starring: Jack Randall; Wesley Barry; Eleanor Stewart; Wilhelm von Brincken; Chester Gan; Glenn Strange
- Cinematography: Bert Longenecker
- Edited by: Howard Dillinger
- Production company: Monogram Pictures
- Distributed by: Monogram Pictures
- Release date: September 14, 1938
- Running time: 51 minutes
- Country: United States
- Language: English

The Mexicali Kid is a 1938 American Western film directed by Wallace Fox and written by Robert Emmett Tansey. The film stars Jack Randall, Wesley Barry, Eleanor Stewart, Wilhelm von Brincken, Chester Gan and Glenn Strange. The film was released on September 14, 1938, by Monogram Pictures.

== Plot ==
Jack is after his brother's killer, he finds The Mexicali Kid collapsed in the desert and saves him, they team up and The Mexicali Kid leads him to Gorson and his men.

== Cast ==
- Jack Randall as Jack Wood
- Wesley Barry as The Mexicali Kid
- Eleanor Stewart as Jean Carter
- Wilhelm von Brincken as Frederick Gorson
- Chester Gan as McCarty
- Glenn Strange as Jed
- Billy Bletcher as Stagecoach Driver
- Ernie Adams as Carl
- Ed Cassidy as Sheriff Ed
- Bud Osborne as Chris Collins
- George Chesebro as Joe Collins
