= Glenn Strange =

American actor (1899–1973)

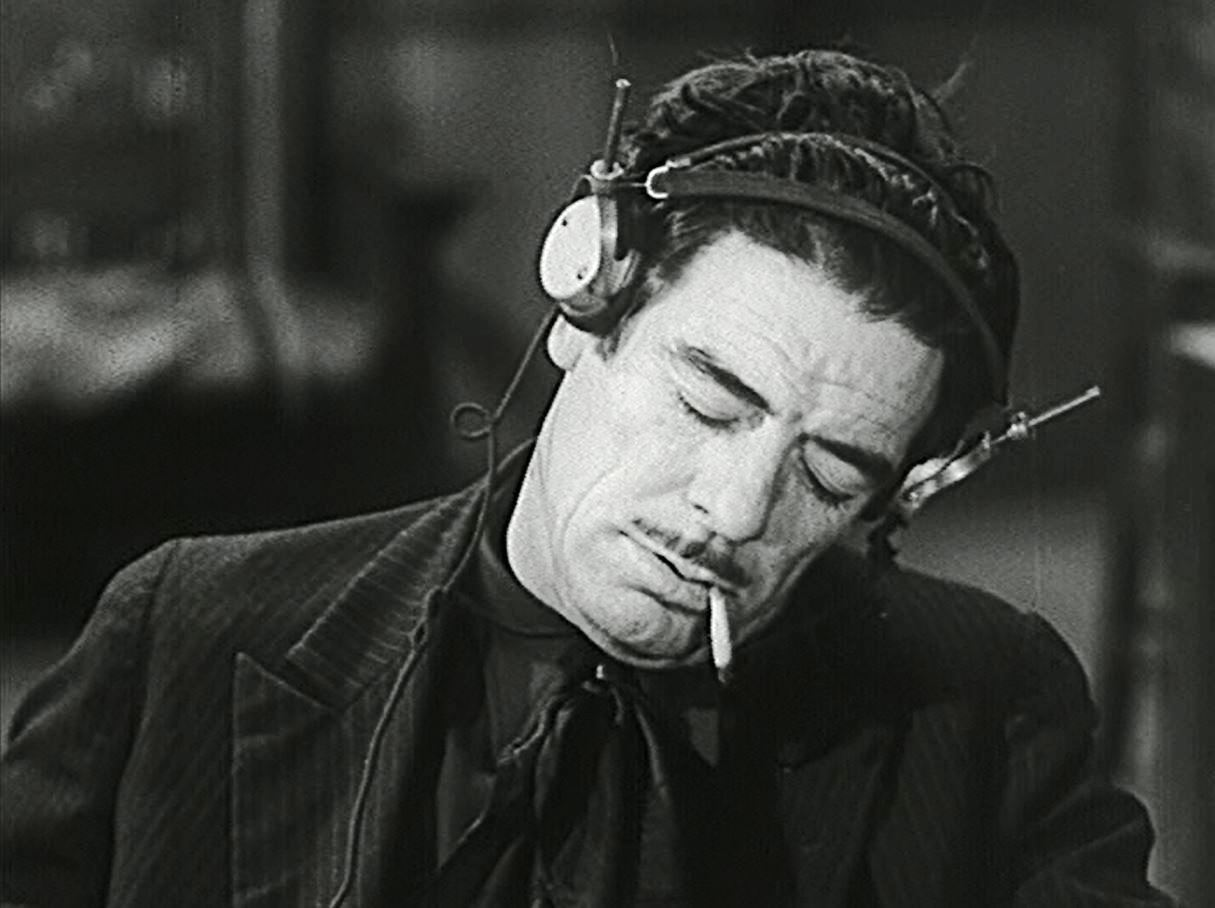
- Strange in Western Mail (1942)
- Born: George Glenn Strange; August 16, 1899; Weed, New Mexico Territory, U.S.
- Died: September 20, 1973 (aged 74); Los Angeles, California, U.S.
- Resting place: Forest Lawn Memorial Park, Hollywood Hills, California, U.S.
- Occupations: Actor, rancher
- Years active: 1930–1973
- Spouse: Nin Strange
- Children: 1

George Glenn Strange (August 16, 1899 – September 20, 1973) was an American actor who appeared in hundreds of Western films. He played Sam Noonan, the bartender on CBS's Gunsmoke television series, and Frankenstein's monster in three Universal films during the 1940s.

== Early life ==
Strange was born in Weed, New Mexico Territory, the fourth child of William Russell Strange and the former Sarah Eliza Byrd. An eighth-generation grandson of Pocahontas and John Rolfe through his maternal grandfather, he was also a cousin of actors Rex Allen and Lee "Lasses" White. Of Irish and Cherokee ancestry through his father, he spoke Cherokee until he was about 13 years old, but in 1972 he said, "since that time I've had nobody to speak it with, so I've lost it."

He grew up on a ranch near Cross Cut, TX, and left school after eighth grade, for his father thought he had enough education to work with cattle. When he was 12 he began playing the fiddle at local dances. In 1928 he began performing music on an El Paso, Texas radio station. Another early job was heavyweight boxing, which caused some "cauliflower" damage to his right ear.

Strange had a close relationship with his cousin Taylor "Cactus Mack" McPeters, who has born one week apart from him. The two would frequently work together in both their acting and music careers.

Strange competed in the Hoot Gibson rodeo but was injured when a horse fell on him. After the injury Gibson looked after him, and Strange began playing outlaws in Gibson's Western films.

== Career ==
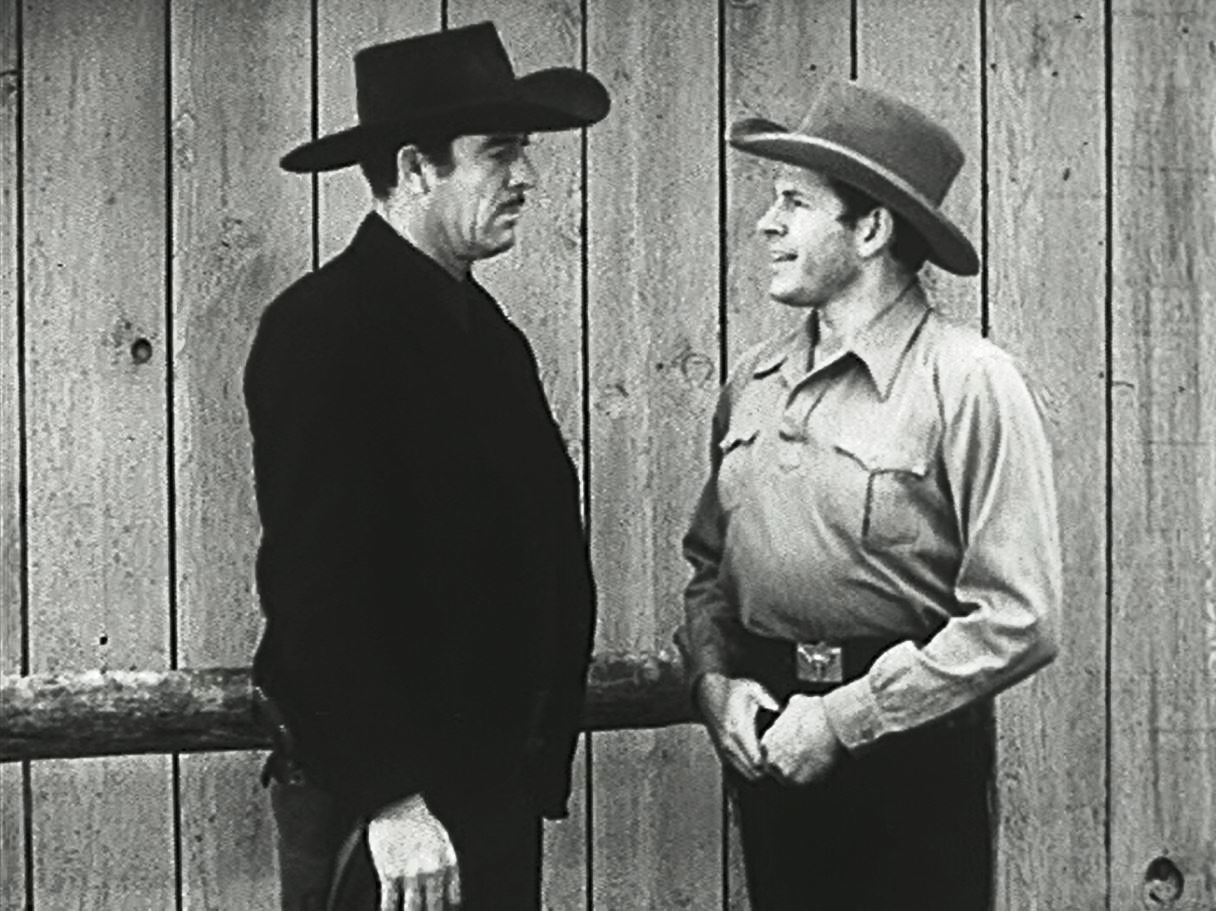
Strange and Fred Kohler Jr. in Western Mail

For much of Strange's acting career most of his roles were playing "bad guys". Because he could handle a stagecoach with six horses hitched up, he was often cast as a stagecoach driver. He had roles in 300 films and 500 television episodes.

In 1932 he had a minor role as part of the Wrecker's gang in a 12-part serial, The Hurricane Express, starring John Wayne. He played numerous small parts in Paramount's popular Hopalong Cassidy film series, usually cast as a member of an outlaw's gang and occasionally as a local sheriff. In 1943, he played an outlaw in the Hopalong Cassidy movie False Colors. He played the killer Naylor Rand in the 1948 film Red River.

Beginning in 1949, he portrayed Butch Cavendish, the villain responsible for killing all but one of the Texas Rangers in the long-running television series The Lone Ranger. Strange appeared twice as Jim Wade on Bill Williams's syndicated Western series geared to juvenile audiences The Adventures of Kit Carson. He also appeared twice as Blake in the syndicated Western The Cisco Kid. In 1952, he was cast in the role of Chief Black Cloud in the episode "Indian War Party" of the syndicated The Range Rider. In 1954, Strange played Sheriff Billy Rowland in Jim Davis's syndicated Western series Stories of the Century. Strange appeared six times in 1956 in multiple roles on Edgar Buchanan's syndicated Judge Roy Bean. That same year, Strange appeared in an uncredited role as the sheriff in Silver Rapids in the Western movie The Fastest Gun Alive starring Glenn Ford. In 1958, he had a minor part in an episode of John Payne's The Restless Gun and had an important role in the 1958 episode "Chain Gang" of the Western series 26 Men, true stories about the Arizona Rangers. That same year, he played rancher Pat Cafferty, who faces the threat of anthrax in the episode "Queen of the Cimarron" of the syndicated Western series, Frontier Doctor. Strange appeared in six episodes of The Rifleman, playing the similar rolee in different variations: Cole, the stagecoach driver, in "Duel of Honor"; a stagecoach shotgun guard in "The Dead-eye Kid"; Joey, a stagecoach driver in "The Woman"; and an unnamed stagecoach driver in "The Blowout", "The Spiked Rifle", and "Miss Bertie".

Strange had parts in the ABC Western The Life and Legend of Wyatt Earp, as well as in Annie Oakley, Buffalo Bill, Jr., Wagon Train and other Western television series. He played an Indian Chief in "Rawhide" S2 E8 "Incident of the Haunted Hills" which aired May 11, 1959.

=== Gunsmoke ===
Strange first appeared on Gunsmoke in 1960 after James Arness asked him, "When are you going to do a Gunsmoke? I like to work with big guys." During Gunsmoke's sixth season, Strange played a Long Branch customer in "Old Faces" and a cowboy in "Melinda Miles".

Strange began playing Sam Noonan during the seventh season and continued in the role for 222 episodes. In 1972 Strange was diagnosed with lung cancer but worked as long as he was able. Five of his episodes were broadcast after his death. His last appearance was on the November 26, 1973, episode "The Hanging of Newly O'Brien".

=== Frankenstein ===
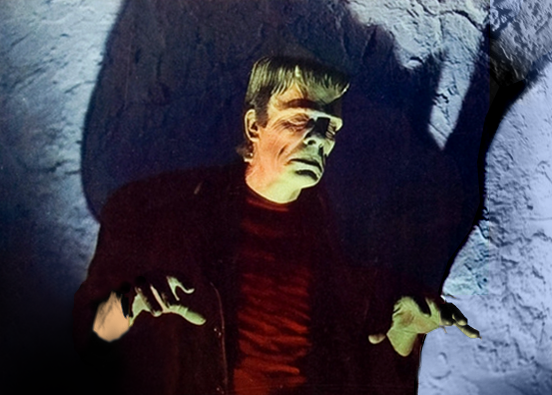
Strange as Frankenstein in House of Dracula (1945)

Strange (left) and Boris Karloff in the 1944 horror film, House of Frankenstein

In 1944, while Strange was being made up for an action film at Universal, make-up artist Jack Pierce noticed that Strange's facial features and 6'4" height would be appropriate for the role of Frankenstein's monster. Strange was cast in the 1944 film House of Frankenstein in the role first played by Boris Karloff in Frankenstein (1931), coached by Karloff personally after hours. Karloff later said he was dissatisfied with Strange's performances as the monster, commenting, "Well, he wasn't as lucky as I was. I got the cream of it, being the first. I know I wished him lots of luck... hoping it would do as much for him as it did for me, but..."

Previously to House of Frankenstein, Strange starred as Petro, who is turned into a wolf-monster by George Zucco, in The Mad Monster (1943). Another role in a horror film was in 1944's The Monster Maker. He also appeared as "The Giant" in the mystery film The Black Raven (1943).

Strange reprised the role of Frankenstein's monster in House of Dracula (1945). Strange played the monster a third time in Abbott and Costello Meet Frankenstein (1948); as in his first two Frankenstein films, he shared the spotlight with Lon Chaney Jr. as the Wolf Man, but this time John Carradine was replaced by Bela Lugosi, in his second screen appearance as Count Dracula. Strange later described working on Abbott and Costello Meet Frankenstein as one of his most enjoyable movie-making experiences. Strange also appeared in character with Lou Costello in a haunted house skit on The Colgate Comedy Hour and made a gag publicity appearance as a masked flagpole-sitter for a local Los Angeles TV show in the 1950s. After weeks of the station teasing the public about the sitter's identity, Strange removed his mask and revealed himself as Frankenstein's monster (actually, yet another mask). Strange also played a monster in the Bowery Boys horror-comedy Master Minds in 1949, mimicking the brain-transplanted Huntz Hall's frantic comedy movements, with Hall providing his own dubbed voice. He was offered the part of the Creature in Creature from the Black Lagoon, but turned it down because he found the costume heavy and claustrophobic.

Strange and Chaney became good friends while working on films together, and Strange spoke at Chaney's funeral in July 1973, despite being seriously ill from the cancer that would end his own life two months later.

During the wave of monster-related merchandising in the late 1950s and 1960s, Glenn Strange's image often was used for the monster on toys, games, and paraphernalia, most often from his appearance in the Abbott and Costello film. In 1969, The New York Times mistakenly published Boris Karloff's obituary with Glenn Strange's picture as the Frankenstein monster.

== Death ==
On September 20, 1973, at age 74, Strange died of lung cancer in Los Angeles, California. Singer Eddie Dean, with whom Strange had collaborated on various songs and opening themes for films, sang at Strange's funeral service as a final tribute. Strange is interred at Forest Lawn - Hollywood Hills Cemetery.

== Selected filmography ==
- Shotgun Pass (1931) – Pee Wee (uncredited)
- Cavalier of the West (1931) – Trooper (uncredited)
- The Gay Buckaroo (1931) – Barfly (uncredited)
- Single-Handed Sanders (1932) – Gang Leader (uncredited)
- The Texas Tornado (1932) – Rustler (uncredited)
- Riders of the Desert (1932) – Singing Ranger (uncredited)
- Cowboy Counsellor (1932) – Stage Driver (uncredited)
- Five Bad Men (1935) – Radio Buckaroo (uncredited)
- Cyclone of the Saddle (1935) – Singer / Fiddler / Townsman (uncredited)
- His Fighting Blood (1935) – Singing Constable (uncredited)
- Suicide Squad (1935) – Singing Fireman (uncredited)
- Flash Gordon (1936, Serial) – Robot / Ming's Soldier / Gocko (uncredited)
- Trailin' West (1936) – Tim – Henchman / Trooper (uncredited)
- A Tenderfoot Goes West (1936) – Cowhand Butch
- Song of the Gringo (1936) – Henchman Blackie (uncredited)
- Guns of the Pecos (1937) – Wedding Groom / Rustler (uncredited)
- Arizona Days (1937) – Henchman Pete
- Trouble in Texas (1937) – Middleton Sheriff
- The Cherokee Strip (1937) – Harry, Fiddle Player and Band Leader (uncredited)
- The Fighting Texan (1937) – Brand-Changing Henchman (uncredited)
- Blazing Sixes (1937) – Peewee Jones
- Mountain Music (1937) – Singing Hillbilly (uncredited)
- Empty Holsters (1937) – Tex Roberts
- Riders of the Dawn (1937) – Posse Member (uncredited)
- The Devil's Saddle Legion (1937) – Peewee
- God's Country and the Man (1937) – Sheriff Joe (uncredited)
- Stars Over Arizona (1937) – Bruce Cole (uncredited)
- Danger Valley (1937) – Marshal Dale (uncredited)
- The Painted Trail (1938) – Sheriff Ed
- The Last Stand (1938) – Henchman Joe
- Whirlwind Horseman (1938) – Bull – Henchman
- Six Shootin' Sheriff (1938) – Kendal Henchman (uncredited)
- Black Bandit (1938) – Luke Johnson
- Guilty Trails (1938) – New Sheriff
- Prairie Justice (1938) – Hank Haynes – Express Agent
- Gun Packer (1938) – Sheriff
- The Phantom Stage (1939) – Sheriff
- The Night Riders (1939) – Angry Riverboat Gambler (uncredited)
- Blue Montana Skies (1939) – Bob Causer
- Across the Plains (1939) – Jeff Masters
- Oklahoma Terror (1939) – Ross Haddon
- Overland Mail (1939) – Sheriff Dawson
- Pioneer Days (1940) – Sheriff
- Rhythm of the Rio Grande (1940) – Sheriff Hays
- Covered Wagon Trails (1940) – Henchman Fletcher
- Pals of the Silver Sage (1940) – Vic Insley
- The Cowboy from Sundown (1940) – Bret Stockton
- Land of the Six Guns (1940) – Manny
- Three Men from Texas (1940) – Ben Stokes
- The San Francisco Docks (1940) – Mike
- The Bandit Trail (1941) – gang member (uncredited)
- The Kid's Last Ride (1941) – Bart Gill, aka Ike Breeden
- Fugitive Valley (1941) – Gray
- Billy the Kid Wanted (1941) – Matt Brawley
- The Driftin' Kid (1941) – Jeff Payson
- Lone Star Law Men (1941) – Marshal Scott
- Billy the Kid's Round-Up (1941) – Vic Landreau
- The Lone Rider and the Bandit (1942) – Luke Miller
- Overland Stagecoach (1942) – Harlen Kent
- Western Mail (1942) – Sheriff Big Bill Collins
- Stagecoach Buckaroo (1942) – Breck Braddock
- Raiders of the West (1942) – Hank Reynolds
- Sundown Jim (1942) – Henchman (uncredited)
- Sunset on the Desert (1942) – Deputy Louie Meade
- Rolling Down the Great Divide (1942) – Joe Duncan
- Boot Hill Bandits (1942) – The Maverick
- Romance on the Range (1942) – Stokes
- Texas Trouble Shooters (1942) – Roger Denby
- Overland Stagecoach (1942) – Harlen Kent
- Billy the Kid Trapped (1942) – Boss Stanton
- Army Surgeon (1942) – Soldier Having Discussion with Brooklyn (uncredited)
- Little Joe, the Wrangler (1942) – Jeff Corey
- The Kid Rides Again (1943) – Henchman Tom Slade
- Haunted Ranch (1943) – Rance Austin
- Black Market Rustlers (1943) – Corbin
- Cattle Stampede (1943) – Stone
- Bullets and Saddles (1943) – Jack Hammond
- Western Cyclone (1943) – Dirk Randall
- The Black Raven (1943) – Andy
- The Mad Monster (1943) – Petro / wolfman
- Action in the North Atlantic (1943) - Jake (uncredited)
- The Monster Maker (1944) – Giant / Steve
- Valley of Vengeance (1944) – Marshal Barker
- Harmony Trail (1944) – Marshal Taylor
- House of Frankenstein (1944) – Frankenstein Monster
- House of Dracula (1945) – Frankenstein Monster
- The Wistful Widow of Wagon Gap (1947) – Lefty
- Sinbad the Sailor – Chief Galley Overseer (uncredited)
- Abbott and Costello Meet Frankenstein (1948) – Frankenstein Monster
- Comin' Round the Mountain (1951) – Devil Dan Winfield
- Terror in a Texas Town (1958) - Train Passenger (uncredited)

== Television ==
Year	Title	Role	Notes
1949–1950	The Lone Ranger	Butch Cavendish	4 Episodes
1959	Rawhide	Indian Chief	S2:E8, "Incident of the Haunted Hills"
1961–1973	Gunsmoke	Sam Noonan	222 Episodes
