= The Driftin' Kid =

The Driftin' Kid refers to:

- The Driftin' Kid (1921 film)
- The Driftin' Kid (1941 film)
