= Frank Yaconelli =

Italian-American actor (1898–1965)

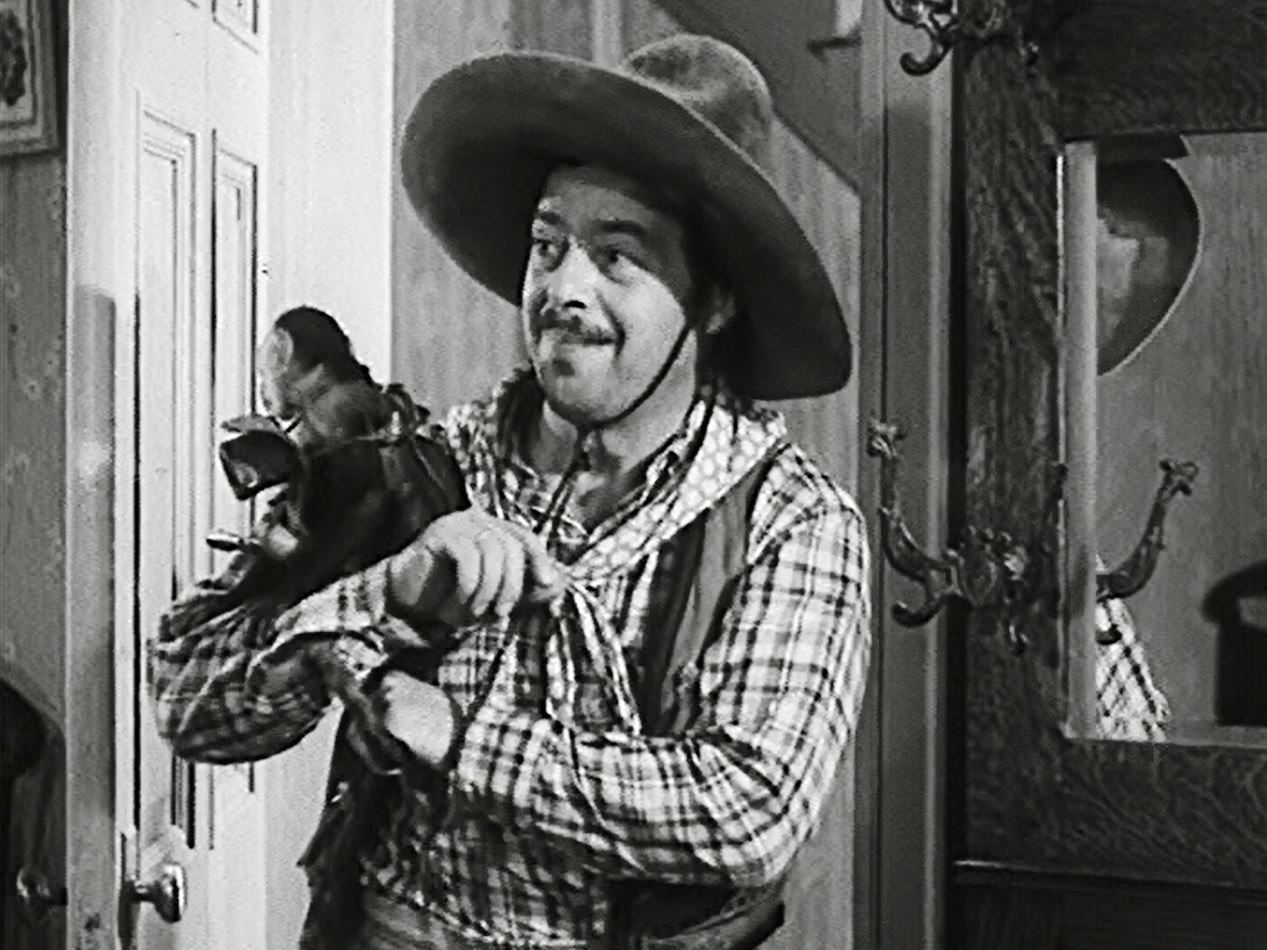
- Yaconelli in Western Mail (1942)
- Born: October 2, 1898; San Biagio, Italy
- Died: November 19, 1965 (aged 67); Los Angeles, California, U.S.
- Occupation: Actor
- Years active: 1923–1958

Frank Yaconelli (October 2, 1898 – November 19, 1965) was an Italian-born American film actor.

== Biography ==
When he was a child his family emigrated to the United States, settling in Boston. Yaconelli was a character actor playing supporting roles, often Southern European or Mexican immigrants. He was also a noted accordion player, and performed in a number of films. He starred alongside Jack Randall in a series of seven westerns produced by Monogram Pictures.

== Selected filmography ==
- Señor Americano (1929)
- Call of the Flesh (1930)
- Parade of the West (1930)
- Firebrand Jordan (1930)
- A Lady's Morals (1930)
- Strawberry Roan (1933)
- The Man Who Dared (1933)
- It Happened One Night (1934) - Tony (uncredited)
- Flirting with Danger (1934)
- Alice Adams (1935)
- Here Comes Cookie (1935)
- Gun Play (1935)
- Five Bad Men (1935)
- Western Frontier (1935)
- Lawless Riders (1935)
- Down to the Sea (1936)
- The Three Mesquiteers (1936)
- Blazing Justice (1936)
- Romance Rides the Range (1936)
- Lucky Terror (1936)
- It Could Happen to You (1937)
- Wild West Days (1937)
- Wild Horse Canyon (1938)
- Across the Plains (1939)
- Escape to Paradise (1939)
- Trigger Smith (1939)
- Drifting Westward (1939)
- The Cheyenne Kid (1940)
- Dr. Cyclops (1940)
- Torrid Zone (1940)
- Pioneer Days (1940)
- East Side Kids (1940)
- Wild Horse Range (1940)
- Fiesta (1941)
- Lone Star Law Men (1941)
- Two in a Taxi (1941)
- The Driftin' Kid (1941)
- Riding the Sunset Trail (1941)
- They Met in Argentina (1941)
- Forced Landing (1941)
- Western Mail (1942)
- Arizona Roundup (1942)
- Where Trails End (1942)
- Man of Courage (1943)
- Slightly Scandalous (1946)
- Beauty and the Bandit (1946)
- South of Monterey (1946)
- The Thrill of Brazil (1946)
- Wild Horse Mesa (1947)
- Riding the California Trail (1947)
- Madonna of the Desert (1948)
- A Foreign Affair (1948)
- Alias the Champ (1949)
- Borderline (1950)
- September Affair (1950)
- Never a Dull Moment (1950)
- A Place in the Sun (1951)
- The Fighter (1952)
- Hangman's Knot (1952)
- The Racers (1955)
- Serenade (1956)
- Three for Jamie Dawn (1956)
- Santiago (1956)
- The Unholy Wife (1957)
- The Parson and the Outlaw (1957)
- The Black Orchid (1958)

== Bibliography ==
- Drew, Bernard A. Motion Picture Series and Sequels: A Reference Guide. Routledge, 2013.
