= Gunsmoke Trail =

1938 film by Sam Newfield

- Theatrical release poster
- Directed by: Sam Newfield
- Screenplay by: Fred Myton
- Story by: Robert Emmett Tansey
- Produced by: Maurice Conn
- Starring: Jack Randall; Louise Stanley; Al St. John; Henry Roquemore; Ted Adams; John Merton
- Cinematography: Jack Greenhalgh
- Edited by: Martin G. Cohn
- Music by: Frank Sanucci
- Production company: Conn Pictures Corporation
- Distributed by: Monogram Pictures
- Release date: May 27, 1938
- Running time: 57 minutes
- Country: United States
- Language: English

Gunsmoke Trail is a 1938 American Western film directed by Sam Newfield and written by Fred Myton. The film stars Jack Randall, Louise Stanley, Al St. John, Henry Roquemore, Ted Adams and John Merton. The film was released on May 27, 1938, by Monogram Pictures.

== Plot ==
After learning about Walters inheritance, Bill Larson kills him and steals his identity, Larson and his men then try to kill Walter's niece but Jack Lane stops them, now it is showdown time.

== Cast ==
- Jack Randall as Jack Lane
- Louise Stanley as Nola Day
- Al St. John as Fuzzy
- Henry Roquemore as Moose Walters
- Ted Adams as Loma
- John Merton as Bill Larson / Moose Walters
- Harry Strang as Stub
- Jack Ingram as Ed
- Kit Guard as Clem
- Hal Price as Scroggins
- Alan Bridge as Sheriff
