= Across the Plains (1939 film) =

1939 film by Spencer Gordon Bennet, Addison Randall

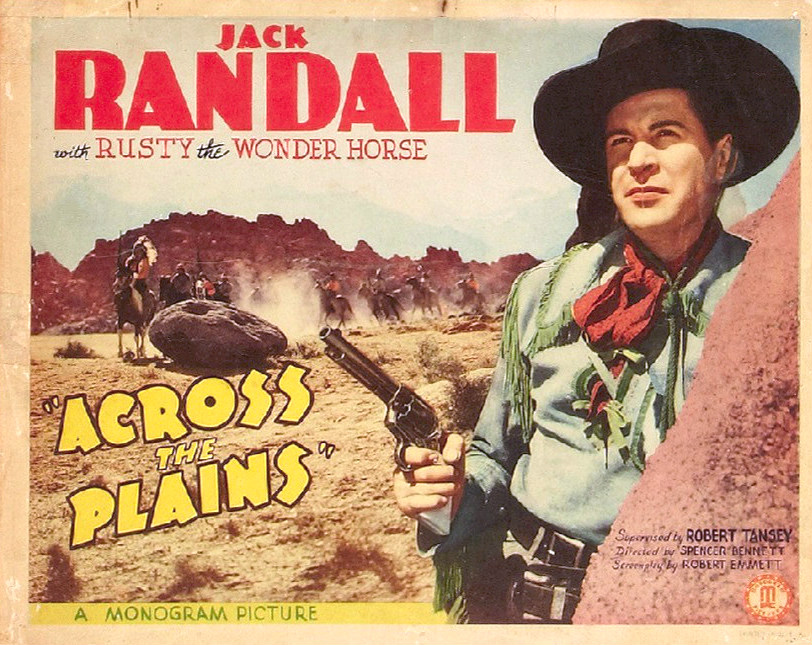
- Theatrical release poster
- Directed by: Spencer Gordon Bennet
- Written by: Robert Emmett Tansey
- Produced by: Robert Emmett Tansey
- Starring: Addison Randall; Frank Yaconelli; Joyce Bryant
- Cinematography: Bert Longenecker
- Edited by: Robert Golden
- Distributed by: Monogram Pictures
- Release date: June 1, 1939
- Running time: 59 minutes
- Country: United States
- Language: English

Across the Plains is a 1939 American Western film directed by Spencer Gordon Bennet and starring Addison Randall, Frank Yaconelli, and Joyce Bryant. Written by Robert Emmett Tansey, the film is about two brothers who are separated when they are young and who meet again as adults, one good and one bad.

Robert Emmett Tansey also wrote the screenplay for the first Republic Pictures feature film Westward Ho (1935 film) (1935) starring John Wayne. The plot of that movie strongly resembles this one and much of the dialogue is the same.

== Plot ==
A gang of outlaws attack a wagon train and orphan two young brothers: Jack and Jimmy. The outlaws take Jimmy with them, while Jack is adopted by an Indian tribe. When they grow up, Jack (Randall) is protecting a shipment of gold, while Jimmy (Moore), now known as the "Kansas Kid," works with the gang of outlaws to steal it. The two clash in the attempted robbery, but before the two men can kill each other, Buckskin, the old wagon train master from their childhood, reveals their true relationship to one another. Once Jimmy discovers that one of the outlaws murdered their parents, he crosses sides. An exciting final shootout ensues between the two brothers and the outlaws, and Jimmy is killed by Gordon's gang. Jimmy regrets to his brother about his past and dies.

== Cast ==
- Addison Randall as Jack Winters, aka Cherokee
- Frank Yaconelli as Lopez
- Joyce Bryant as Mary Masters
- Hal Price as Buckskin
- Dennis Moore as Jimmy Winters, aka The Kansas Kid
- Glenn Strange as Jeff Masters
- Bob Card as Buff Gordon
- Bud Osborne as Henchman Lex
- Monte Rawlins as Henchman Rip
- Wylie Grant as Henchman Rawhide
