= Gun Packer (1938 film) =

1938 film

- Directed by: Wallace Fox
- Written by: Robert Emmett Tansey
- Produced by: Scott R. Dunlap; Robert Emmett Tansey
- Starring: Jack Randall; Louise Stanley; Charles King
- Cinematography: Bert Longenecker
- Edited by: Howard Dillinger
- Music by: Abe Meyer
- Production company: Monogram Pictures
- Distributed by: Monogram Pictures
- Release date: November 16, 1938
- Running time: 51 minutes
- Country: United States
- Language: English

Gun Packer is a 1938 American western film directed by Wallace Fox and starring Jack Randall, Louise Stanley and Charles King. It was produced and distributed by Monogram Pictures. In 1949 it was remade by Monogram as Range Land.

== Cast ==
- Jack Randall as Jack Denton - aka Jack Drake, aka Trigger Smith
- Louise Stanley as Ruth Adams
- Charles King as Chance Moore
- Barlowe Borland as Professor Angel
- Dave O'Brien as Red Baker - Henchman
- Lloyd Ingraham as Chief E. B. Holmes
- Glenn Strange as Sheriff
- Ernie Adams as Jim Lee - Stage Driver
- Ray Turner as Pinkie - Jack's Sidekick
- Forrest Taylor as Hart - Express Manager

== Bibliography ==
- Fetrow, Alan G. . Sound films, 1927-1939: a United States Filmography. McFarland, 1992.
- Pitts, Michael R. Western Movies: A Guide to 5,105 Feature Films. McFarland, 2012.
