= Trigger Smith =

- Theatrical release poster
- Directed by: Alan James
- Written by: Robert Emmett Tansey
- Produced by: Robert Emmett Tansey
- Starring: Jack Randall; Frank Yaconelli; Joyce Bryant
- Cinematography: Bert Longenecker
- Edited by: Howard Dillinger
- Production company: Monogram Pictures
- Distributed by: Monogram Pictures
- Release date: March 22, 1939
- Running time: 59 minutes
- Country: United States
- Language: English

Trigger Smith is a 1939 American Western film directed by Alan James. It was produced and distributed by Monogram Pictures.

== Cast ==
- Jack Randall as Trigger Smith
- Frank Yaconelli as Lopez
- Joyce Bryant as Jean
- Warner Richmond as Gallop
- Dave O'Brien as Duke
- Dennis Moore as Bud
- Bob Clark as Buck
- Frank LaRue as Marshal Smith

== Reception ==
A contemporary review in Variety called the film average, but pleasantly entertaining. A review in The Grant County News was also positive.
