= Wilhelm von Brincken =

German actor (1881-1946)

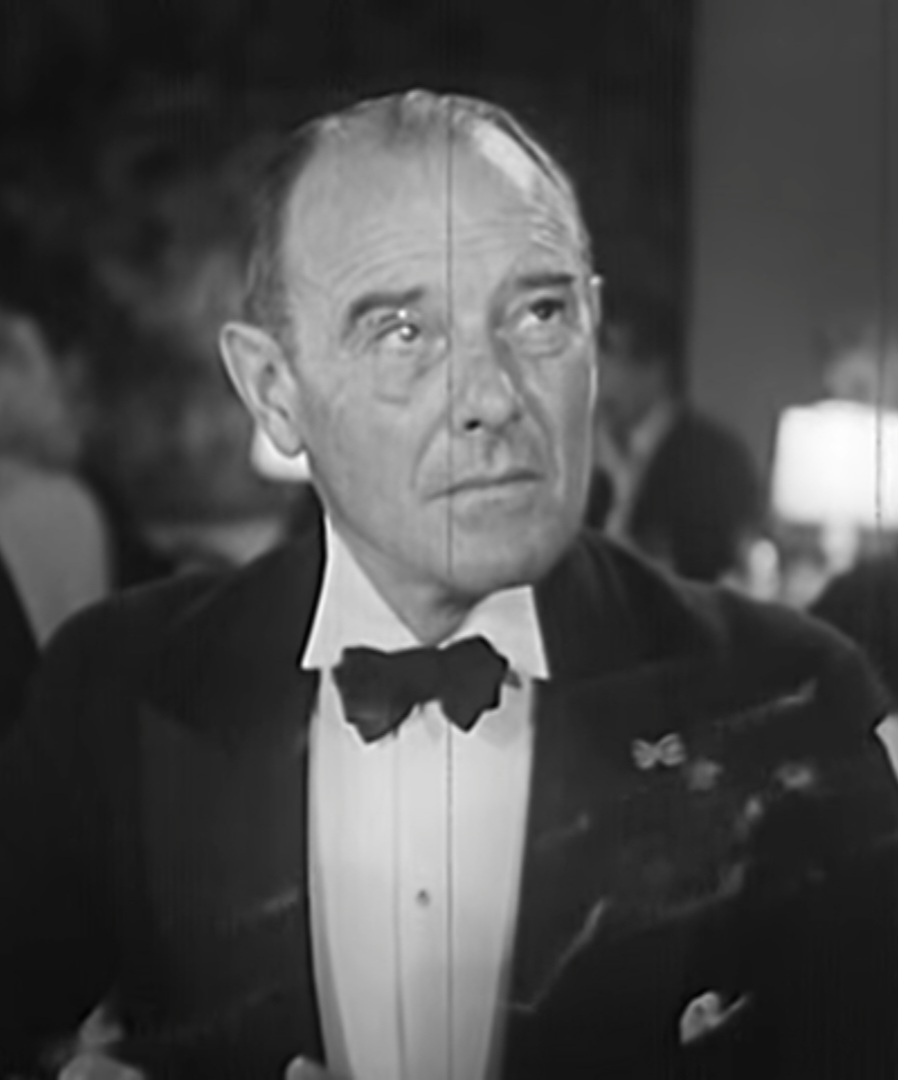
- Brincken in International Crime (1938)
- Born: Wilhelm Vaughn; May 27, 1881; Flensburg, Kingdom of Prussia, German Empire
- Died: January 18, 1946 (aged 64); Los Angeles, California, U.S.
- Resting place: Forest Lawn Memorial Park, Glendale, California
- Other names: William Vaughn, William Vaughan, William von Brinken
- Occupation: Actor
- Years active: 1914–1944
- Spouses: Alice M. Roedel (m. 1910; div. 1914) Milo Abercrombie (m. 1915; div. 1919)
- Children: 4

Wilhelm von Brincken (May 27, 1881 – January 18, 1946), also known as Wilhelm L. von Brincken, William Vaughn, William von Brinken, and William Vaughan, was a German diplomat and spy during World War I, who went on to become an American character actor of the silent and talkie eras.

== Personal life ==
Von Brincken was born on May 27, 1881, in Flensburg, Germany. His father was a German diplomat from Prussia, as well as being a baron. While a student at Military Telegraph School in Berlin, he engaged in a sword duel. While he won, the event left him with a permanent facial scar. He graduated from the University of Strasbourg, as well as the Potsdam War College. Von Brincken was an officer in the German cavalry, being a lieutenant in the Royal Saxon Cavalry.

Von Brincken had a ranch near Sunnyvale, California. In 1910, he married Alice Roedel of San Mateo, in Blankenburg, Germany. They had one child, a son, Hans Frederich Wilhelm. The couple split up in December 1912, when von Brincken left her. Alice finally filed for divorce in October 1914, which as required by law, become official in October 1915. By 1915, von Brincken was the military attache to the German embassy in San Francisco. Von Brincken was also a knight of the Teutonic Order.

On October 27, 1915, von Brincken married again to San Francisco socialite Milo Abercrombie. Born in Houston, Texas, Milo was the niece of John W. Abercrombie, U.S. congressman from Alabama, and she was acclaimed by noted portraitist Harrison Fisher as "California's greatest beauty". Their daughter was born in January 1917, and named Cecilie, after her Godmother, Crown Princess Cecilie. They also had a son, named after the father, Wilhelm Friedrich. She divorced von Brincken in 1919 during his imprisonment and legally changed her, and her children's last name back to her maiden name, Abercrombie, so her children would not be "ashamed" of their name. She also changed the given names of both of the children, Wilhelm, to John Milo Abercrombie and Cecilie to Maria Milo Abercrombie. Although by 1938, when he was in college, his son was once again using the name of Wilhelm F.

In 1920, after he was released from prison, he legally changed his name to Roger Beckwith and filed for U. S. citizenship. His citizenship became formal in 1927. In becoming a citizen, he renounced his claim to his German barony.

In October 1920, von Brincken married for a third time, to Mrs. Ruth McConnell Swartz of Los Angeles, a widow. The two had met several years earlier, and had recently reconnected after his release from prison, and were married in a small ceremony in Canada. Ruth filed for divorce in May 1922, which was granted the following September.

Von Brincken remarried yet again, this time to 21-year-old Bertie Rogers, of Eastman, Georgia, who was an actress in Los Angeles. The two divorced in January 1927. By 1933, von Brincken had married once again.

While in Hollywood in January 1946, von Brincken suffered a ruptured artery. He was rushed to St. Vincent's Hospital, where he died on January 18, 1946. He is interred in Forest Lawn Memorial Park in Glendale, California.

== Espionage activity ==
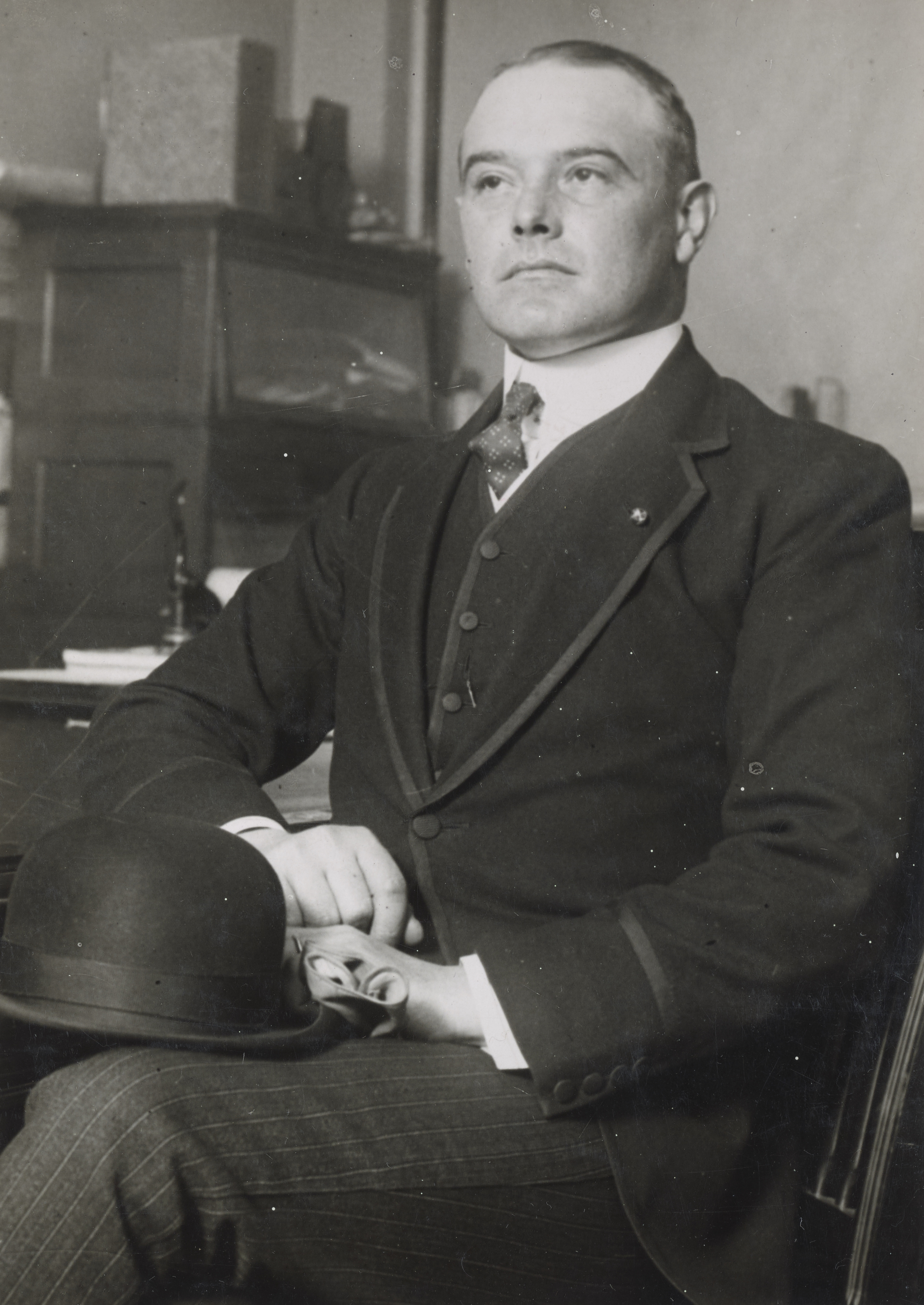
Brincken in 1919

In 1915, he was transferred to the West coast, and assigned to the consulate in San Francisco. While working at the San Francisco consulate, he was arrested at the beginning of World War I on espionage charges, due to his alleged involvement in a bomb plot with his co-conspirators, C.C. Crowley, who worked at the German consulate, and an agent of a German shipping line, Robert Capelle. In February 1916, he was indicted, along with dozens of others, including the German consul general and his vice-consul, Franz Bopp and Baron E.H. von Schack, respectively. Von Brincken was convicted and sentenced to serve two years in prison in the Hindu–German Conspiracy Trial for plotting to foment an insurrection against British colonial rule in India, this sentence to run concurrently with a similar conviction for his alleged participation in bomb and dynamiting plots against the government of Canada. Von Brincken served his two-year sentence at Alcatraz Prison and McNeil Island Penitentiary.

== Film career ==
Von Brincken made his American film debut acting in The Redemption of David Corson (1914). After his release from prison in 1920, von Brincken became an American citizen in 1921. A fellow German expatriate, Erich von Stroheim, included him in a group of former German military men whom he invited to Hollywood to work on films. Due to his military background, he was called upon as a military expert and a technical advisor on films, including the Academy Award-winning All Quiet on the Western Front (1930).

Von Brincken returned to acting in Von Stroheim's 1928 film, Queen Kelly, starring Gloria Swanson.

Over the course of his career, he appeared under several different variants of his name, such as von Brinken, as well as going under Anglicized versions of his name, such as William Vaughn and Vaughan, when doing so was politically correct.

In 1929 and 1930, he had small roles in several films before receiving featured roles such as in the Eddie Foy and Irene Dunne film, Leathernecking, and playing the German ace, Baron Manfred von Richthofen in Howard Hughes' 1930 classic, Hells Angels. Most of the rest of the 1930s had him appearing in numerous films, in both minor and featured roles.

With the outbreak of hostilities in Europe in 1939, von Brincken was often cast in the role of a Nazi, such as in 1939's Confessions of a Nazi Spy, the Fay Wray film Navy Secrets (1939), and 1941's So Ends Our Night, which stars Fredric March, Margaret Sullavan, Frances Dee, and Glenn Ford. Not only did he appear in dramas and suspense films, but he also did comedies such as The Ritz Brothers' 1939 film, Pack Up Your Troubles, and Once Upon a Honeymoon (1942), starring Cary Grant and Ginger Rogers.

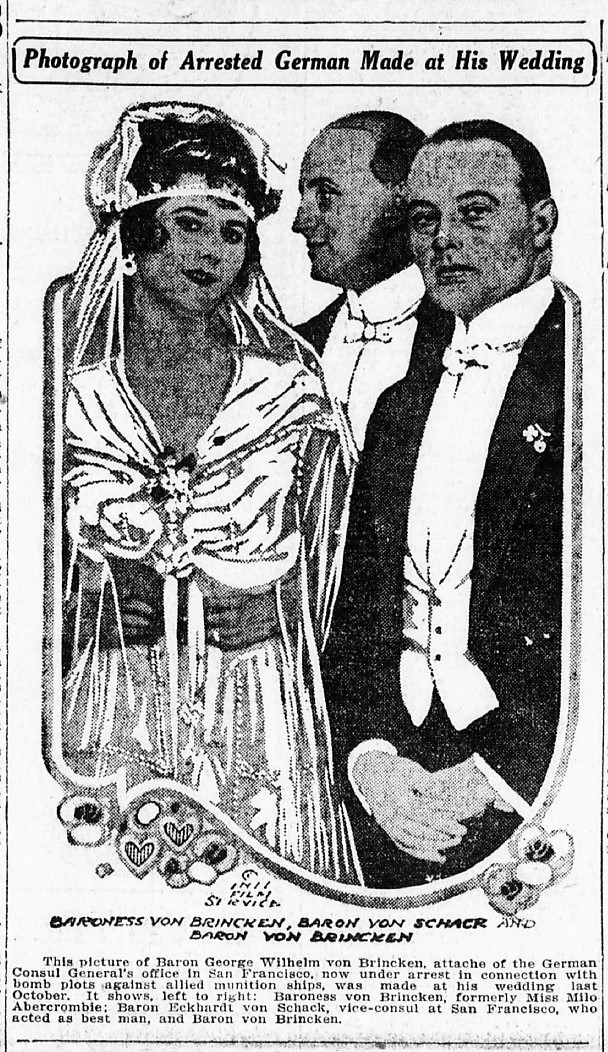
Wilhelm Von Brincken at his wedding to Milo Abercrombie in October,1915

Milo Abercrombie, ca 1915.

== Filmography ==
(Per AFI database)

- The Redemption of David Corson (1914)
- The Brute (1914)
- The Man Who Beat Dan Dolan (1915)
- Sally, Irene and Mary (1925) as Party Reveler
- The Prince of Pilsen (1926) as Captain of the Guard
- Condemned (1929) as Vidal's Orderly (uncredited)
- General Crack (1930) as Capt. Schmidt
- Hell's Angels (1930) as Von Richter (uncredited)
- Leathernecking (1930) as Richter
- Inside the Lines (1930) as Chief, Secret Service
- The Lonesome Trail (1930) as Man in White Sombrero
- Mamba (1930) as Major von Schultz
- Three Faces East (1930) as Capt. Kugler (uncredited)
- Command Performance (1931) as Capt. Boyer
- The Unholy Garden (1931) as Minor Role (scenes deleted)
- Possessed (1931) as Baron von Bergen - Party Guest (uncredited)
- Surrender (1931) as Konrad Reichendorf (uncredited)
- Queen Kelly (1932) as Prince Wolfram's Adjutant (uncredited)
- A Passport to Hell (1932) as Officer
- Six Hours to Live (1932) as Reporter (uncredited)
- The Night Club Lady (1932) as Dr. Emil Lengle (uncredited)
- Shanghai Madness (1933) as von Uhlenberg
- Private Jones (1933)
- Crimson Romance (1934) as Von Gering
- Fugitive Road (1934) as Lt. Berne
- Flirting with Danger (1934) as Von Kruger
- King Kelly of the U.S.A. (1934) as Stranger
- Viva Villa (1934) as German Reporter (scenes deleted)
- The Gay Bride (1934) as German Official (uncredited)
- I'll Tell the World (1934) as Joseph
- The Melody Lingers On (1935) as Austrian Officer (uncredited)
- Dracula's Daughter (1936) as Policeman (uncredited)
- Crack-Up (1936) as Spy (uncredited)
- Espionage (1937) as Legation Officer (uncredited)
- They Gave Him a Gun (1937) as German Captain (uncredited)
- Charlie Chan at the Olympics (1937) as Polizei Officer (uncredited)
- The Prisoner of Zenda (1937) as Krafstein
- Wallaby Jim of the Islands (1937) as Adolph Richter, Pearl Hunter
- Thank You, Mr. Moto (1937) as Schneider
- Bulldog Drummond in Africa (1938) as Dr. Stern (uncredited)
- The Mexicali Kid (1938) as Frederick Gorson
- Navy Secrets (1939) as Cronjer - Spy Ring Chief
- Panama Patrol (1939) as Marlin
- Confessions of a Nazi Spy (1939) as Captain von Eichen
- Conspiracy (1939) as Second-Mate Wilson
- Espionage Agent (1939) as Foreign Official (uncredited)
- Pack Up Your Troubles (1939) as Mueller
- Hidden Enemy (1940) as Professor Werner
- Dr. Ehrlich's Magic Bullet (1940) as Officer (uncredited)
- Four Sons (1940) as Gortner
- So Ends Our Night (1941) as German Official
- Man Hunt (1941) as Harbor Police Chief (uncredited)
- Underground (1941) as Capt. Bornsdorff (uncredited)
- The Deadly Game (1941) as Nazi Agent
- Miss V from Moscow (1942) as Capt. Richter
- Once Upon a Honeymoon (1942) as German Colonel with American Consul (uncredited)
- Berlin Correspondent (1942)
- Counter-Espionage (1942) as Von Ruhoff (uncredited)
- Desperate Journey (1942) as Gate Sentry (uncredited)
- Joan of Ozark (1942) as German Radio Operator
- Joan of Paris (1942) as Schultz - Funk's Secretary (uncredited)
- The Navy Comes Through (1942) as Captain of 'Odin' (uncredited)
- Reunion in France (1942) as Major (uncredited)
- Where Trails End (1942) as Tip Wallace
- A Yank in Libya (1942) as Yussof Streyer
- Chetniks! (1943)
- The Purple V (1943) as Col. von Ritter
- The Boy from Stalingrad (1943) as German General
- Background to Danger (1943) as German Official (uncredited)
- Assignment in Brittany (1943) as German Major (uncredited)
- Action in the North Atlantic (1943) as German Sub Captain (uncredited)
- The Cross of Lorraine (1943) as German Officer in Car (uncredited)
- Around the World (1943) as German (uncredited)
- The Hitler Gang (1944) as Police Official (uncredited)
