= Bert Longenecker =

American cinematographer

- Born: September 16, 1876; Tumwater, Washington, United States
- Died: May 10, 1940 (aged 63); Los Angeles, California, United States
- Occupation: Cinematographer
- Years active: 1914–1939 (film)

Bert Longenecker (1876–1940) was an American cinematographer. He was active in Hollywood during the 1920s and 1930s, primarily on westerns at lower-budget Poverty Row companies including Aywon, Monogram and Republic Pictures. He frequently worked with the prolific director Robert N. Bradbury.

== Filmography ==
- Riders of the Law (1922)
- The Forbidden Trail (1923)
- Wolf Tracks (1923)
- Gallopin' Through (1923)
- Slow as Lightning (1923)
- Desert Rider (1923)
- The Air Hawk (1924)
- Behind Two Guns (1924)
- Dynamite Dan (1924)
- $50,000 Reward (1924)
- Riders of Mystery (1925)
- The Flying Fool (1925)
- With Kit Carson Over the Great Divide (1925)
- With Buffalo Bill on the U. P. Trail (1926)
- The Fighting Doctor (1926)
- Better Days (1927)
- Circle Canyon (1933)
- Adventures of Texas Jack (1934)
- A Scream in the Night (1934)
- The Rawhide Terror (1934)
- The Fire Trap (1935)
- The Irish Gringo (1935)
- Fighting Caballero (1935)
- Between Men (1935)
- Sundown Saunders (1935)
- Custer's Last Stand (1936)
- Desert Phantom (1936)
- Brand of the Outlaws (1936)
- Last of the Warrens (1936)
- Cavalry (1936)
- The Crime Patrol (1936)
- The Law Rides (1936)
- Valley of the Lawless (1936)
- The Gun Ranger (1936)
- Lightnin' Crandall (1937)
- Doomed at Sundown (1937)
- Reckless Ranger (1937)
- Trail of Vengeance (1937)
- Riders of the Dawn (1937)
- Guns in the Dark (1937)
- Boothill Brigade (1937)
- God's Country and the Man (1937)
- The Red Rope (1937)
- The Gambling Terror (1937)
- Where Trails Divide (1937)
- Romance of the Rockies (1937)
- The Trusted Outlaw (1937)
- Gun Lords of Stirrup Basin (1937)
- A Lawman Is Born (1937)
- Danger Valley (1937)
- Stars Over Arizona (1937)
- Bar-Z Bad Men (1937)
- The Painted Trail (1938)
- The Mexicali Kid (1938)
- Gun Packer (1938)
- Man's Country (1938)
- Wanted by the Police (1938)
- Wild Horse Canyon (1938)
- Across the Plains (1939)
- Drifting Westward (1939)
- Oklahoma Terror (1939)
- Sundown on the Prairie (1939)
- Trigger Smith (1939)
- Overland Mail (1939)

== Bibliography ==
- Darby, William. Masters of Lens and Light: A Checklist of Major Cinematographers and Their Feature Films. Scarecrow Press, 1991.
- Munden, Kenneth White. The American Film Institute Catalog of Motion Pictures Produced in the United States, Part 1. University of California Press, 1997.
