= Trail of the Silver Spurs =

1941 film by S. Roy Luby

- Directed by: S. Roy Luby
- Screenplay by: Earle Snell
- Story by: Elmer Clifton
- Produced by: George W. Weeks
- Starring: Ray "Crash" Corrigan; John 'Dusty' King; Max Terhune; I. Stanford Jolley; Dorothy Short; Milburn Morante
- Cinematography: Robert E. Cline
- Edited by: S. Roy Luby
- Production company: Monogram Pictures
- Distributed by: Monogram Pictures
- Release date: January 4, 1941
- Running time: 57 minutes
- Country: United States
- Language: English

Trail of the Silver Spurs is a 1941 American Western film directed by S. Roy Luby and written by Earle Snell. The film is the fourth in Monogram Pictures' "Range Busters" series, and it stars Ray "Crash" Corrigan as Crash, John "Dusty" King as Dusty and Max "Alibi" Terhune as Alibi, with I. Stanford Jolley, Dorothy Short and Milburn Morante. The film was released on January 4, 1941, by Monogram Pictures.

== Cast ==
- Ray "Crash" Corrigan as Crash Corrigan
- John 'Dusty' King as Dusty King
- Max Terhune as Alibi Terhune
- I. Stanford Jolley as The Jingler
- Dorothy Short as Nancy Nordick
- Milburn Morante as Dan Nordick
- George Chesebro as Wilson
- Eddie Dean as Stoner

== See also ==
The Range Busters series:

- The Range Busters (1940)
- Trailing Double Trouble (1940)
- West of Pinto Basin (1940)
- Trail of the Silver Spurs (1941)
- The Kid's Last Ride (1941)
- Tumbledown Ranch in Arizona (1941)
- Wrangler's Roost (1941)
- Fugitive Valley (1941)
- Saddle Mountain Roundup (1941)
- Tonto Basin Outlaws (1941)
- Underground Rustlers (1941)
- Thunder River Feud (1942)
- Rock River Renegades (1942)
- Boot Hill Bandits (1942)
- Texas Trouble Shooters (1942)
- Arizona Stage Coach (1942)
- Texas to Bataan (1942)
- Trail Riders (1942)
- Two Fisted Justice (1943)
- Haunted Ranch (1943)
- Land of Hunted Men (1943)
- Cowboy Commandos (1943)
- Black Market Rustlers (1943)
- Bullets and Saddles (1943)
