= Pioneer Days (1940 film) =

1940 film

- Directed by: Harry S. Webb
- Written by: Bennett Cohen
- Produced by: Harry S. Webb
- Starring: Jack Randall; June Wilkins; Frank Yaconelli
- Cinematography: Edward A. Kull
- Edited by: Robert Golden
- Music by: Lew Porter
- Production company: Monogram Pictures
- Distributed by: Monogram Pictures
- Release date: January 25, 1940
- Running time: 54 minutes
- Country: United States
- Language: English

Pioneer Days is a 1940 American western film directed by Harry S. Webb and starring Jack Randall, June Wilkins and Frank Yaconelli.

== Plot ==
A private detective employed by a stagecoach company investigating a series of hold-ups on the route goes undercover to try and catch the guilty party. He comes to suspect it may be Slater, a man who has cheated the attractive Mary Leeds out of her half-share of a saloon bar.

== Cast ==
- Jack Randall as Jack Dunham
- June Wilkins as Mary Leeds
- Frank Yaconelli as Manuel Gonzales Julian Ramariez
- Nelson McDowell as Judge Tobias Tarryton
- Ted Adams as Slater
- Bud Osborne as Saunders - Henchman
- Robert Walker as Trigger - Henchman
- George Chesebro as Roper - Henchman
- Glenn Strange as Sheriff
- Jimmy Aubrey as Stagecoach Guard
- Lafe McKee as Sam - Express Agent
- Richard Cramer as Jim - Bartender
- Victor Adamson as Henchman

== Bibliography ==
- Pitts, Michael R. Western Movies: A Guide to 5,105 Feature Films. McFarland, 2012.
