= Wild Horse Canyon =

1938 film

- Theatrical release poster
- Directed by: Robert F. Hill
- Screenplay by: Robert Emmett Tansey
- Produced by: Robert Emmett Tansey
- Starring: Jack Randall; Dorothy Short; Frank Yaconelli; Warner Richmond; Walter Long; Dennis Moore
- Cinematography: Bert Longenecker
- Edited by: Howard Dillinger
- Production company: Monogram Pictures
- Distributed by: Monogram Pictures
- Release date: December 21, 1938
- Running time: 57 minutes
- Country: United States
- Language: English

Wild Horse Canyon is a 1938 American Western film directed by Robert F. Hill and written by Robert Emmett Tansey. The film stars Jack Randall, Dorothy Short, Frank Yaconelli, Warner Richmond, Walter Long and Dennis Moore. The film was released on December 21, 1938, by Monogram Pictures.

== Cast ==
- Jack Randall as Jack Gray
- Dorothy Short as Jean Hall
- Frank Yaconelli as Lopez Valdesto
- Warner Richmond as Travers
- Walter Long as Roscoe
- Dennis Moore as Pete Hall
- Charles King as Red
- Ed Cassidy as Tom Hall
- Earl Douglas as Valdesto
- Hal Price as Sheriff
