= Man's Country (film) =

- Theatrical release poster
- Directed by: Robert F. Hill
- Screenplay by: Robert Emmett Tansey
- Produced by: Robert Emmett Tansey
- Starring: Jack Randall; Marjorie Reynolds; Walter Long; Forrest Taylor; David Sharpe
- Cinematography: Bert Longenecker
- Edited by: Michael Luciano
- Production company: Monogram Pictures
- Distributed by: Monogram Pictures
- Release date: July 6, 1938
- Running time: 53 minutes
- Country: United States
- Language: English

Man's Country is a 1938 American Western film directed by Robert F. Hill and written by Robert Emmett Tansey. The film stars Jack Randall, Marjorie Reynolds, Walter Long, Forrest Taylor, and David Sharpe. The film was released on July 6, 1938, by Monogram Pictures.

== Cast ==
- Jack Randall as Jack Hale
- Marjorie Reynolds as Madge Crane
- Walter Long as Lex Crane / Buck Crane
- Ralph Peters as Snappy O'Connor
- Forrest Taylor as Colonel Hay
- David Sharpe as Ted Crane
- Harry Harvey Sr. as Sergeant James
- Charles King as Steve
- Bud Osborne as Jed
- Dave O'Brien as Bert
