= Flirting with Danger =

1934 film directed by Vin Moore

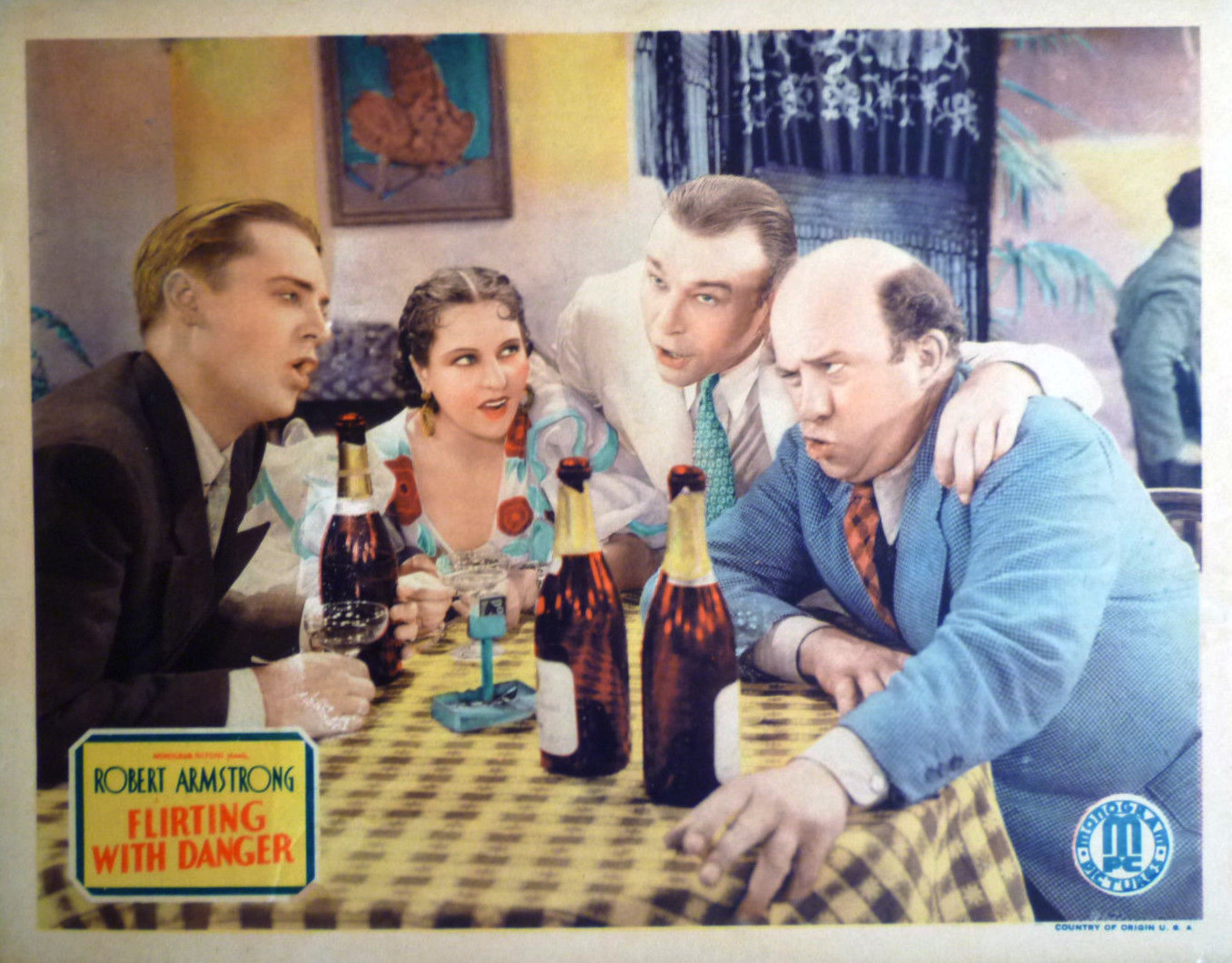
- Lobby card
- Directed by: Vin Moore
- Written by: Albert DeMond; George Bertholon; Norman S. Hall
- Produced by: Trem Carr; A. George Bertholon
- Starring: Robert Armstrong; Edgar Kennedy
- Cinematography: Archie Stout
- Edited by: Carl Pierson
- Distributed by: Monogram Pictures
- Release date: December 1, 1934
- Running time: 70 minutes
- Country: United States
- Language: English

Flirting with Danger is a 1934 American comedy adventure film directed by Vin Moore and starring Robert Armstrong, Edgar Kennedy and William Cagney (James Cagney's lookalike brother). The picture was released by Monogram Pictures and has a running time of 62 minutes.

== Cast ==
- Robert Armstrong as Bob Owens
- Edgar Kennedy as Jimmy Pierson
- William Cagney as William "Lucky" Davis
- Maria Alba as Rosita
- Marion Burns as Marian Leslie
- Ernest Hilliard as James Dawson
- Wilhelm von Brincken as Von Kruger (credited as Wm. L. von Brincken)
- Guy Usher as James E. Fenton
- Gino Corrado as Captain Garcia
- Edward Hearn as San Rico Plant Supervisor
- Carol Tevis as Cecilia, Stuttering Blonde (uncredited)
- Frank Yaconelli as Spanish Man in Cafe (uncredited)
- Margaret La Marr (uncredited)
