= Bullets and Saddles =

1943 film

- Original film poster
- Directed by: Anthony Marshall
- Written by: Elizabeth Beecher; Arthur Hoerl
- Produced by: George W. Weeks
- Cinematography: Edward A. Kull
- Edited by: S. Roy Luby
- Distributed by: Monogram Pictures Corporation
- Release date: 1943
- Running time: 56 minutes
- Country: United States
- Language: English

Bullets and Saddles is a 1943 American Western film produced by Monogram Pictures Corporation shot at Corriganville. The film is the twenty-fourth and final entry in Monogram Pictures' "Range Busters" series, and it stars Ray "Crash" Corrigan as Dusty, Dennis Moore as Denny and Max Terhune as Alibi, with Julie Duncan, Budd Buster and Rose Plumer. Bullets and Saddles uses footage from Fugitive Valley, another film in the series.

== Plot ==
A crooked businessman tries to get control of an area with his gang. The Range Busters are called in to try to stop his plan.

== Cast ==
- Ray Corrigan as Ray "Crash" Corrigan
- Dennis Moore as Denny Moore
- Max Terhune as Max "Alibi" Terhune
- Julie Duncan as Laura Craig
- Budd Buster as Charley Craig
- Rose Plumer as Mother Craig
- Forrest Taylor as Marshal Claiburn
- Glenn Strange as Jack Hammond

== See also ==
The Range Busters series:

- The Range Busters (1940)
- Trailing Double Trouble (1940)
- West of Pinto Basin (1940)
- Trail of the Silver Spurs (1941)
- The Kid's Last Ride (1941)
- Tumbledown Ranch in Arizona (1941)
- Wrangler's Roost (1941)
- Fugitive Valley (1941)
- Saddle Mountain Roundup (1941)
- Tonto Basin Outlaws (1941)
- Underground Rustlers (1941)
- Thunder River Feud (1942)
- Rock River Renegades (1942)
- Boot Hill Bandits (1942)
- Texas Trouble Shooters (1942)
- Arizona Stage Coach (1942)
- Texas to Bataan (1942)
- Trail Riders (1942)
- Two Fisted Justice (1943)
- Haunted Ranch (1943)
- Land of Hunted Men (1943)
- Cowboy Commandos (1943)
- Black Market Rustlers (1943)
- Bullets and Saddles (1943)
