= Charles Soldani =

American actor (1893–1968)

Charles "Chief" Soldani
- Charles Soldani in Death Valley Days (1960)
- Born: Charles Leon Soldani; June 1, 1893; Ponca City, Oklahoma, U.S.
- Died: September 10, 1968 (aged 75); Glendale, California, U.S.
- Resting place: Forest Lawn Memorial Park (Glendale), California, U.S.
- Occupation: Actor
- Years active: 1926–1967
- Spouses: Madeline Montgomery (m. 1920, divorced) Joice L. Gardner (m. 1934)

Charles Leon Soldani (June 1, 1893 – September 10, 1968) was a Native American film and television actor. He appeared – often uncredited – in dozens of Western movies and television series, usually playing an Indian warrior or chief. He went by "Chief Soldani" starting in his college days.

== Early life ==
Soldani was born in Ponca City, Oklahoma, on June 1st, 1893. His father was Anthony "Godance" Soldani, an Osage farmer, and Katherine Fronkier, a Kaw woman, both originally from Kansas.

He attended the University of Notre Dame, where he played tackle on a football team and performed in staged productions.

After serving in World War I where he achieved second lieutenant, he worked as a car salesman and married Madeline Montgomery in Indianapolis, whom he eventually divorced.

== Career ==
After moving to Los Angeles, Soldani encountered success in amateur golf championships.

He got his acting debut playing an Indian in War Paint, a 1926 silent Western directed by W.S. Van Dyke. He eventually transitioned to talkies and obtained his first credit in 1939 in The Pioneers, directed by Albert Herman. His credit as "Chief Soldani" became his nickname in Hollywood.

Soldani became one of the industry's go-to actors to portray Native Americans from various tribes, either in an uncredited part or in a speaking role, along with the occasional portraying of a "native" in South Seas genre productions.

Starting in the late 1950s, most of Soldani's work focused on television, appearing in multiple episodes of Western television series like The Adventures of Rin Tin Tin, Zorro, Bonanza, Laramie, Maverick, The Wild Wild West or Daniel Boone.

== Personal life and death ==
Soldani remarried in 1934 to Joice L. Gardner in Yuma, Arizona, whom he lived with in the Los Angeles area until his death in 1968.

He was an avid billiard player and kept playing golf well into his 70s.

== Selected filmography ==
=== Film ===
| Year | Title | Role | Notes |
|---|---|---|---|
| 1926 | War Paint | Indian | uncredited |
| 1938 | Flaming Frontiers | Indian | uncredited |
| 1939 | The Kid from Texas | Wild West Show Indian | uncredited |
| 1939 | Zorro's Fighting Legion | Cave Indian | uncredited |
| 1940 | Kit Carson | Indian | uncredited |
| 1941 | The Pioneers | Chief Lone Deer | credited as Chief Soldani |
| 1941 | Outlaws of Cherokee Trail | Poker Player | uncredited |
| 1942 | Valley of the Sun | Apache | uncredited |
| 1943 | Daredevils of the West | Indian | uncredited |
| 1943 | The Desperadoes | Indian | uncredited |
| 1943 | Frontier Fury | Indian | uncredited |
| 1943 | Thank Your Lucky Stars | Gower Gulch Indian | uncredited |
| 1943 | The Phantom | Native | uncredited |
| 1944 | Arizona Whirlwind | Indian | uncredited |
| 1944 | Buffalo Bill | Indian | uncredited |
| 1944 | The Tiger Woman | Tribe member | uncredited |
| 1944 | Tahiti Nights | Privy counselor | uncredited |
| 1945 | The Great Flamarion | Audience member | uncredited |
| 1946 | Rio Grande Raiders | Barfly | uncredited |
| 1950 | Winchester '73 | Town Indian | uncredited |
| 1950 | Broken Arrow | Chosen Warrior | uncredited |
| 1952 | High Noon | Indian outside of saloon | |
| 1952 | Son of Geronimo: Apache Avenger | Apache | uncredited |
| 1953 | Lili | Carnival worker | uncredited |
| 1953 | Saginaw Trail | Indian | uncredited |
| 1953 | Calamity Jane | Indian | uncredited |
| 1957 | Man of a Thousand Faces | Actor in bullpen | uncredited |
| 1959 | Escort West | Indian | |
| 1959 | The FBI Story | Indian on train | uncredited |
| 1961 | Buffalo Gun | Chief | |
| 1962 | The Man Who Shot Liberty Valance | Statehood audience member | uncredited |

=== Television ===
| Year | Title | Role | Notes |
|---|---|---|---|
| 1951 | The Cisco Kid | Chief Red Moon | Season 2 Episode 6: "Medicine Man Show" (credited as Charles L. Soldani) |
| 1954 | Stories of the Century | Indian | Season 1 Episode 15: "Chief Crazy Horse" |
| 1954-1956 | The Adventures of Rin Tin Tin | Indian Elder / Indian / Gang Member / Townsman / Soldier / Yaqui | 11 episodes |
| 1956 | Sergeant Preston of the Yukon | Indian (uncredited) | Season 1 Episode 23: "Totem Treasure" |
| 1956 | Soldiers of Fortune | Townsman (uncredited) | Season 2 Episode 9: "The Tattooed Lady of Torima" |
| 1957–1959 | Zorro | Indian / Townsman | Season 1 Episode 9: "A Fair Trial" (1957); Season 1 Episode 14: "Shadow of Doubt" (1958); Season 1 Episode 15: "Garcia Stands Accused (1958); Season 1 Episode 18: "Zorro Fights His Father" (1958); Season 2 Episode 33: "Invitation to Death" (1959) |
| 1958–1960 | Tombstone Territory | Cantina Barfly / Barfly | Season 1 Episode 38: "Thicker Than Water" (1958); Season 3 Episode 14: "Advice from a Dead Man" (1960) |
| 1958–1960 | Sugarfoot | Indian / Fight Spectator | Season 1 Episode 16: "Guns for Big Bear" (1958); Season 3 Episode 12: "Fernando" (1960); Season 4 Episode 1: "The Shadow Catcher" (1960) |
| 1958–1961 | Wagon Train | Indian / Aztec / Minister | Season 2 Episode 9: "The Sakae Ito Story" (1958); Season 2 Episode 27: "The Swift Cloud Story" (1959); Season 4 Episode 6: "Princess of a Lost Tribe" (1960); Season 4 Episode 29: "The Joe Muharich Story" (1961) |
| 1958–1963 | Death Valley Days | Indian / Trial Spectator | Season 6 Episode 10: "The Greatest Scout of All" (1958); Season 8 Episode 7: "Indian Emily" (1959); Season 9 Episode 9: "The White Healer" (1960); Season 11 Episode 23: "With Honesty and Integrity" (1963) |
| 1959 | Bonanza | Townsman / Indian | Season 1 Episode 1: "A Rose for Lotta"; Season 1 Episode 2: "Death on Sun Mountain"; Season 1 Episode 7: "The Saga of Annie O'Toole" |
| 1959–1960 | Bronco | Bandit / Indian | Season 2 Episode 7: "Flight from an Empire" (1959); Season 3 Episode 3: "Seminole War Pipe" (1960) |
| 1959–1961 | Laramie | Indian / Townsman | Season 1 Episode 3: "Circle of Fire" (1959); Season 2 Episode 3: "Three Rode West" (1960); Season 2 Episode 16: "Killer Without Cause" (1961) |
| 1959–1961 | Maverick | Indian / Indian Chief / Chief | Season 3 Episode 9: "The Ghost Soldiers" (1959); Season 4 Episode 18: "The Cactus Switch" (1961); Season 4 Episode 19: "Dutchman's Gold" (1961); Season 4 Episode 32: "The Devil's Necklace: Part 2" (1961) |
| 1960 | Bat Masterson | Townsman / Diner Patron | Season 2 Episode 22: "The Disappearance of Bat Masterson"; Season 2 Episode 23: "The Snare"; Season 3 Episode 13: "The Lady Plays Her Hand" |
| 1965–1966 | The Wild Wild West | Townsman / Indian | Season 1 Episode 1: "The Night of the Inferno" (1965); Season 1 Episode 9: "The Night of the Double-Edged Knife" (1965); Season 2 Episode 2 Episode 10: "The Night of the Green Terror" (1966) |
| 1965–1967 | Daniel Boone | Indian | Season 1 Episode 16: "The First Stone" (1965); Season 2 Episode 17: "Seminole Territory" (1966); Season 3 Episode 2: "The Allegiances" (1966); Season 4 Episode 12: "Chief Mingo" (1967) |
| 1967–1968 | Cimarron Strip | Indian Elder / Indian | Season 1 Episode 2: "The Legend of Jud Starr" (1967); Season 1 Episode 17: "Heller" (1968) |
| 1968 | The Virginian | Indian (uncredited) | Season 7 Episode 7: "The Heritage" |
