= Overland Mail (1939 film) =

1939 western film

- Directed by: Robert F. Hill
- Written by: Robert Emmett Tansey
- Produced by: Robert Emmett Tansey
- Starring: Jack Randall; Vince Barnett; Dennis Moore
- Cinematography: Bert Longenecker
- Edited by: Robert Golden
- Music by: Frank Sanucci
- Production company: Monogram Pictures
- Distributed by: Monogram Pictures
- Release date: November 16, 1939
- Running time: 51 minutes
- Country: United States
- Language: English

Overland Mail is a 1939 American western film directed by Robert F. Hill and starring Jack Randall, Vince Barnett, and Dennis Moore. It was produced and distributed by Monogram Pictures which specialized in low-budget second features, particularly westerns.

== Plot ==
Two overland mail riders discover that a Native American uprising is likely due to the death of one of the tribe at the hands of townspeople. They discover that a gang of counterfeiters are behind the murder and turn over their leader to the Indian chief.

== Cast ==
- Jack Randall as Jack Mason
- Vince Barnett as Porchy
- Jean Joyce as Mary Martin
- Tristram Coffin as Joe Polini
- George Cleveland as Frank Porter - aka Saunders
- Dennis Moore as Duke Evans
- Glenn Strange as Sheriff Dawson
- Jimmie Fox as Pat - Storekeeper
- Maxine Leslie as Blondie
- Hal Price as Lugo
- Merrill McCormick as Buck - Henchman
- Joe Garcio as Squint - Henchman
- Harry Semels as Pancho
- Iron Eyes Cody as Indian Chief

== Bibliography ==
- Pitts, Michael R. Western Movies: A Guide to 5,105 Feature Films. McFarland, 2012.
