= The Pioneers (1941 film) =

1941 film

- Directed by: Albert Herman
- Written by: James Fenimore Cooper (story); Robert Emmett Tansey
- Produced by: Edward Finney
- Starring: Tex Ritter; Karl Hackett; Wanda McKay
- Cinematography: Marcel Le Picard
- Edited by: Fred Bain
- Music by: Frank Sanucci
- Production company: Edward F. Finney Productions
- Distributed by: Monogram Pictures
- Release date: May 10, 1941
- Running time: 58 minutes
- Country: United States
- Language: English

The Pioneers is a 1941 American Western film directed by Albert Herman and starring Tex Ritter, Karl Hackett and Wanda McKay. It was inspired by the 1823 novel of the same name by James Fenimore Cooper and distributed by Monogram Pictures.

== Plot ==
A frontiersman leads a group of pioneering settlers to their new homestead.

== Cast ==
- Tex Ritter as Tex Ritter
- Wanda McKay as Suzanna Ames
- Slim Andrews as Slim Hunkafeller
- Red Foley as Red Foley
- Doye O'Dell as Doye O'Dell
- Del Lawrence as John Ames
- George Chesebro as Wilson - Henchman
- Karl Hackett as Carson
- Lynton Brent as Jingo - Henchman
- Gene Alsace as Sheriff
- Chief Many Treaties as Chief Warcloud
- Charles Soldani as Chief Lone Deer

== Bibliography ==
- Bond, Johnny. The Tex Ritter Story. Chappell Music Company, 1976.
