= Wild Horse Range (film) =

1940 American film

- Theatrical release poster
- Directed by: Raymond K. Johnson
- Screenplay by: Carl Krusada
- Story by: Tom Gibson
- Produced by: Harry S. Webb
- Starring: Jack Randall
- Cinematography: Edward A. Kull; William Hyer
- Edited by: Robert S. Golden
- Music by: Johnny Lange; Lew Porter
- Production company: Monogram Pictures Corp.
- Release date: June 25, 1940 (US)
- Running time: 58 minutes
- Country: United States
- Language: English

Wild Horse Range is a 1940 American Western film written by Carl Krusada from a story by Tom Gibson. It was directed by Raymond K. Johnson, and stars Jack Randall.

== Plot ==
Jack Wallace is a horse trader who, along with his partner, Manny, is undercut at the auctions time and again by Arnold, another horse trader. Frustrated by their lack of success, Wallace reasons that the only way Arnold can continually undercut him is if his rival is selling stolen horses. However, he no proof to back up his conclusion. In order to get the needed evidence, he starts tracking down some of the horses which have recently been stolen from his herd. This leads him to Arrowhead Ranch, whose owner is Harriet Morgan. Harriet lives on the ranch with her niece, Ann. Harriet tells him that she has indeed been losing stock, but that their ranch hands are claiming that the horses were not stolen, but were being encouraged by a white stallion to leave the herd.

There is obvious romantic chemistry between Wallace and Ann, and when he offers to investigate the matter, Harriet readily agrees. Wallace and Manny take off to track down the mysterious white stallion. As they track the stallion, they are led to a remote ranch, which is the hideout of Arnold and his gang of rustlers, which includes the ranch hands from the Arrowhead Ranch. In the corral are the next bunch of stolen horses they plan to sell. They realize the white stallion led them to the rustlers. They open the corral gate and release the stolen horses, who are led away by the stallion. After a fierce gun battle, Wallace and Manny take the gang and deliver them to the sheriff, after which they return the horses to their rightful owners.

Returning to the ranch, Wallace is embraced by Ann, and agrees to settle down on the ranch.

== Cast ==
- Jack Randall as Jack Wallace
- Frank Yaconelli as Manny
- Phyllis Ruth as Ann Morgan
- Marin Sais as Harriet Morgan
- Ralph Hoopes as Buddy Mitchell
- Forrest Taylor as Harvey Mitchell
- Charles King as Stoner
- Tom London as Arnold
- George Chesebro as Ed Baker
- Carl Mathews as Frank
- Steve Clark as Sheriff

== Production ==
In late April, 1940 it was reported that production on the film had begun. Filming was concluded by May 8, and it went into the editing room shortly after. While a release date had not yet been set, in mid-May it was revealed that Jack Randall would be in the starring role, with the rest of the cast including Frank Yaconelli, Phyllis Ruth, Marin Sais, Ralph Hoopes, and Tom London. Raymond K. Johnson was announced as the director, with the screenplay by Karl Krusada, while Harry Webb would handle the producing duties. On June 1, it was reported that the release date for the film would be June 18. However, the release was delayed by one week, releasing on June 25. The Legion of Decency gave the film a class A1 rating, meaning it was "Unobjectionable for General Patronage".

== Reception ==
The Film Daily gave the picture a lukewarm review, calling it a "routine western", but saying that it had enough "action to make it okay for cowboy fans". They complimented the direction and cinematography. Showmen's Trade Review likewise gave the film a lukewarm write-up. They felt that there were some "inconsistencies" in the plot, like the lead being able to read by moonlight, and also were less kind to the cinematography, which they felt was static. While they felt the romantic angle left much to be desired, they felt that the film had its entertaining moments and, like The Film Daily, felt that it would have appeal for fans of the Western genre.
