= Thunder River Feud =

1942 film by S. Roy Luby

- Theatrical release poster
- Directed by: S. Roy Luby
- Screenplay by: John Vlahos; Earle Snell
- Story by: Earle Snell
- Produced by: George W. Weeks
- Starring: Ray "Crash" Corrigan; John 'Dusty' King; Max Terhune; Jan Wiley; Jack Holmes; Rick Anderson
- Cinematography: Robert E. Cline
- Edited by: S. Roy Luby
- Music by: Frank Sanucci
- Production company: Monogram Pictures
- Distributed by: Monogram Pictures
- Release date: January 9, 1942
- Running time: 58 minutes
- Country: United States
- Language: English

Thunder River Feud is a 1942 American Western film directed by S. Roy Luby and written by John Vlahos and Earle Snell. The film is the twelfth in Monogram Pictures' "Range Busters" series, and it stars Ray "Crash" Corrigan as Crash, John "Dusty" King as Dusty and Max "Alibi" Terhune as Alibi, with Jan Wiley, Jack Holmes and Rick Anderson. The film was released on January 9, 1942.

== Plot ==
At the Tucson Rodeo, Dusty fails in a competition, but the winner is Crash who earns a prize belt. When Crash is having a bath a newspaper photographer comes into the room and takes a picture of Dusty identifying himself as Crash. Crash is angry that Dusty has stolen his name and glory but sees that the beautiful Maybelle Pembroke is returning home to Thunder River. Alibi had worked for the Pembrokes long ago but warns Crash that she would not be interested in a cowboy. Crash pawns his prize belt to buy a suit where he masquerades as a writer from New England. Dusty arrives at the ranch to impersonate Crash as the new foreman. The trio unite to stop a feud between two families in Thunder River with a Romeo and Juliet type situation where Maybelle loves Grover Harrison from the family that is the sworn enemy of the Pembrokes.

== Cast ==
- Ray "Crash" Corrigan as 'Crash' Corrigan
- John 'Dusty' King as 'Dusty' King
- Max Terhune as 'Alibi' Terhune
- Jan Wiley as Maybelle Pembroke
- Jack Holmes as Jim Pembroke
- Rick Anderson as Colonel Harrison
- Carleton Young as Grover Harrison
- George Chesebro as Dick Taggert
- Carl Mathews as Pete
- Budd Buster as Sheriff
- Ted Mapes as Buck
- Steve Clark as Shorty Branson

== See also ==
The Range Busters series:

- The Range Busters (1940)
- Trailing Double Trouble (1940)
- West of Pinto Basin (1940)
- Trail of the Silver Spurs (1941)
- The Kid's Last Ride (1941)
- Tumbledown Ranch in Arizona (1941)
- Wrangler's Roost (1941)
- Fugitive Valley (1941)
- Saddle Mountain Roundup (1941)
- Tonto Basin Outlaws (1941)
- Underground Rustlers (1941)
- Thunder River Feud (1942)
- Rock River Renegades (1942)
- Boot Hill Bandits (1942)
- Texas Trouble Shooters (1942)
- Arizona Stage Coach (1942)
- Texas to Bataan (1942)
- Trail Riders (1942)
- Two Fisted Justice (1943)
- Haunted Ranch (1943)
- Land of Hunted Men (1943)
- Cowboy Commandos (1943)
- Black Market Rustlers (1943)
- Bullets and Saddles (1943)
