= The Kid's Last Ride =

1941 film by S. Roy Luby

- Theatrical release poster
- Directed by: S. Roy Luby
- Screenplay by: Earle Snell
- Produced by: George W. Weeks
- Starring: Ray "Crash" Corrigan; John 'Dusty' King; Max Terhune; Luana Walters; Edwin Brian; Alan Bridge
- Cinematography: Robert E. Cline
- Edited by: S. Roy Luby
- Production company: Monogram Pictures
- Distributed by: Monogram Pictures
- Release date: February 10, 1941
- Running time: 55 minutes
- Country: United States
- Language: English

The Kid's Last Ride is a 1941 American Western film directed by S. Roy Luby and written by Earle Snell. The film is the fifth in Monogram Pictures' "Range Busters" series, and it stars Ray "Crash" Corrigan as Crash, John "Dusty" King as Dusty and Max "Alibi" Terhune as Alibi, with Luana Walters, Edwin Brian and Alan Bridge. The film was released on February 10, 1941, by Monogram Pictures.

== Plot ==
Jimmy is forced by Harmon to reveal some hidden money's location. But when Harmon's men go after the money, the attempted robbery is broken up by the Range Busters. Harmon then lays a trap for Crash.

== Cast ==
- Ray "Crash" Corrigan as Crash Corrigan
- John 'Dusty' King as Dusty King
- Max Terhune as Alibi Terhune
- Luana Walters as Sally Rowell
- Edwin Brian as Jimmy Rowell
- Alan Bridge as Bob Harmon / Jim Breeden
- Glenn Strange as Bart Gill / Ike Breeden
- Frank Ellis as Wash
- John Elliott as Dish washer
- George Havens as Johnny

== See also ==
The Range Busters series:

- The Range Busters (1940)
- Trailing Double Trouble (1940)
- West of Pinto Basin (1940)
- Trail of the Silver Spurs (1941)
- The Kid's Last Ride (1941)
- Tumbledown Ranch in Arizona (1941)
- Wrangler's Roost (1941)
- Fugitive Valley (1941)
- Saddle Mountain Roundup (1941)
- Tonto Basin Outlaws (1941)
- Underground Rustlers (1941)
- Thunder River Feud (1942)
- Rock River Renegades (1942)
- Boot Hill Bandits (1942)
- Texas Trouble Shooters (1942)
- Arizona Stage Coach (1942)
- Texas to Bataan (1942)
- Trail Riders (1942)
- Two Fisted Justice (1943)
- Haunted Ranch (1943)
- Land of Hunted Men (1943)
- Cowboy Commandos (1943)
- Black Market Rustlers (1943)
- Bullets and Saddles (1943)
