= Trailing Double Trouble =

- Theatrical release poster
- Directed by: S. Roy Luby
- Screenplay by: George H. Plympton; Oliver Drake
- Produced by: George W. Weeks
- Starring: Ray "Crash" Corrigan; John 'Dusty' King; Max Terhune; Lita Conway; Nancy Louise King; Roy Barcroft
- Cinematography: Edward Linden
- Edited by: S. Roy Luby
- Production company: Monogram Pictures
- Distributed by: Monogram Pictures
- Release date: October 10, 1940
- Running time: 56 minutes
- Country: United States
- Language: English

Trailing Double Trouble is a 1940 American Western film directed by S. Roy Luby and written by George H. Plympton and Oliver Drake. The film is the second in Monogram Pictures' "Range Busters" series, and it stars Ray "Crash" Corrigan as Crash, John "Dusty" King as Dusty and Max "Alibi" Terhune as Alibi, with Lita Conway, Nancy Louise King and Roy Barcroft. The film was released on October 10, 1940, by Monogram Pictures.

== Plot ==
The Range Busters chase a group of outlaws shooting at the occupant of a wagon. When the outlaws flee the Range Busters discover the wagon's driver is dead but there is a live baby in the wagon. They discover that the villains are trying to abduct the child to get their hands on a valuable piece of property.

== Cast ==
- Ray "Crash" Corrigan as 'Crash' Corrigan
- John 'Dusty' King as Dusty King
- Max Terhune as 'Alibi' Terhune
- Lita Conway as Marion Horner
- Nancy Louise King as The Baby
- Roy Barcroft as Jim Moreland
- Jack Rutherford as Amos Hardy
- Tom London as Kirk
- William Kellogg as Walt
- Carl Mathews as Drag
- Forrest Taylor as Sheriff
- Kenne Duncan as Bob Horner
- Rex Felker as Rope Twirler

== See also ==
The Range Busters series:

- The Range Busters (1940)
- Trailing Double Trouble (1940)
- West of Pinto Basin (1940)
- Trail of the Silver Spurs (1941)
- The Kid's Last Ride (1941)
- Tumbledown Ranch in Arizona (1941)
- Wrangler's Roost (1941)
- Fugitive Valley (1941)
- Saddle Mountain Roundup (1941)
- Tonto Basin Outlaws (1941)
- Underground Rustlers (1941)
- Thunder River Feud (1942)
- Rock River Renegades (1942)
- Boot Hill Bandits (1942)
- Texas Trouble Shooters (1942)
- Arizona Stage Coach (1942)
- Texas to Bataan (1942)
- Trail Riders (1942)
- Two Fisted Justice (1943)
- Haunted Ranch (1943)
- Land of Hunted Men (1943)
- Cowboy Commandos (1943)
- Black Market Rustlers (1943)
- Bullets and Saddles (1943)
