= Where Trails End =

1942 film

- Theatrical release poster
- Directed by: Robert Emmett Tansey
- Screenplay by: Robert Emmett Tansey; Frances Kavanaugh
- Produced by: Robert Emmett Tansey
- Starring: Tom Keene; Frank Yaconelli; Joan Curtis; Don Stewart; Charles King; Wilhelm von Brincken
- Cinematography: Robert E. Cline
- Edited by: Fred Bain
- Music by: Frank Sanucci
- Production company: Monogram Pictures
- Distributed by: Monogram Pictures
- Release date: May 1, 1942
- Running time: 55 minutes
- Country: United States
- Language: English

Where Trails End is a 1942 American Western film directed by Robert Emmett Tansey and written by Robert Emmett Tansey and Frances Kavanaugh. The film stars Tom Keene, Frank Yaconelli, Joan Curtis, Don Stewart, Charles King and Wilhelm von Brincken. The film was released on May 1, 1942, by Monogram Pictures.

== Cast ==
- Tom Keene as Tom Kenyon
- Frank Yaconelli as Pierre La Fair
- Joan Curtis as Joan Allen
- Don Stewart as Donny Bedford
- Charles King as Jim Regan
- Wilhelm von Brincken as Tip Wallace
- Steve Clark as Steve Allen
- Horace B. Carpenter as George Kent
- Nick Moro as Pancake
- James Sheridan as Buck
- Steven Clensos as Red
- Fred Hoose as Mr. Wade
