= The Painted Trail (1938 film) =

1938 film

- Directed by: Robert F. Hill
- Written by: Robert Emmett Tansey
- Produced by: Robert Emmett Tansey; Scott R. Dunlap
- Starring: Tom Keene; Eleanor Stewart; LeRoy Mason
- Cinematography: Bert Longenecker
- Edited by: Howard Dillinger
- Music by: Abe Meyer
- Production company: Monogram Pictures
- Distributed by: Monogram Pictures
- Release date: February 16, 1938
- Running time: 51 minutes
- Country: United States
- Language: English

The Painted Trail is a 1938 American Western film directed by Robert F. Hill and starring Tom Keene, Eleanor Stewart, and LeRoy Mason.

== Cast ==
- Tom Keene as Tom Gray posing as the Pecos Kid
- Eleanor Stewart as Alice Banning
- LeRoy Mason as Duke Prescott
- Walter Long as Gang Leader Driscoll
- Frank Campeau as U.S. Marshal G. Masters
- James Eagles as Henchman Sammy
- Harry Harvey Sr. as U.S. Marshal Reed
- Glenn Strange as Sheriff Ed
- Ed Cassidy as U.S. Marshal Jackson
- Ernie Adams as Henchman Nosey
- Buzz Barton as Roulette Player

== Bibliography ==
- Pitts, Michael R. Western Movies: A Guide to 5,105 Feature Films. McFarland, 2012.
