= The Driftin' Kid (1941 film) =

1941 film

- Theatrical release poster
- Directed by: Robert Emmett Tansey
- Screenplay by: Robert Emmett Tansey; Frances Kavanaugh
- Produced by: Robert Emmett Tansey
- Starring: Tom Keene; Betty Miles; Frank Yaconelli; Glenn Strange; Stanley Price; Fred Hoose
- Cinematography: Marcel Le Picard
- Edited by: Fred Bain
- Production company: Monogram Pictures
- Distributed by: Monogram Pictures
- Release date: October 17, 1941
- Running time: 57 minutes
- Country: United States
- Language: English

The Driftin' Kid is a 1941 American Western film directed by Robert Emmett Tansey and written by Robert Emmett Tansey and Frances Kavanaugh. The film stars Tom Keene, Betty Miles, Frank Yaconelli, Glenn Strange, Stanley Price and Fred Hoose. The film was released on October 17, 1941, by Monogram Pictures.

== Cast ==
- Tom Keene as Tom Sterling / Jim Vernon
- Betty Miles as Betty Lane
- Frank Yaconelli as Lopez Mendoza
- Glenn Strange as Jeff Payson
- Stanley Price as Rex Jenkins
- Fred Hoose as Sheriff Parker
- Slim Andrews as Slim Chance
- Gene Alsace as Blackie Thompson
- Steve Clark as Roger Lane
- Earl Douglas as Ace Reed
- James Sheridan as Buckhorn
