= Tumbledown Ranch in Arizona =

1941 film by S. Roy Luby

- Theatrical release poster
- Directed by: S. Roy Luby
- Screenplay by: Milton Raison
- Produced by: George W. Weeks
- Starring: Ray "Crash" Corrigan; John 'Dusty' King; Max Terhune; Sheila Darcy; Marian Kerby; Quen Ramsey
- Cinematography: Robert E. Cline
- Edited by: S. Roy Luby
- Production company: Monogram Pictures
- Distributed by: Monogram Pictures
- Release date: April 20, 1941
- Running time: 60 minutes
- Country: United States
- Language: English

Tumbledown Ranch in Arizona is a 1941 American Western film directed by S. Roy Luby and written by Milton Raison. The film is the sixth in Monogram Pictures' "Range Busters" series, and it stars Ray "Crash" Corrigan as Crash, John "Dusty" King as Dusty and Max "Alibi" Terhune as Alibi, with Sheila Darcy, Marian Kerby and Quen Ramsey. The film was released on April 20, 1941, by Monogram Pictures.

== Cast ==
- Ray "Crash" Corrigan as 'Crash' Corrigan
- John 'Dusty' King as 'Dusty' King
- Max Terhune as 'Alibi' Terhune
- Sheila Darcy as Dorothy Jones
- Marian Kerby as Mother Rogers
- Quen Ramsey as Gallop
- James Craven as Dan Slocum
- John Elliott as Judge Jones
- Jack Holmes as Sheriff Nye
- Steve Clark as Shorty Gill
- Sam Bernard as Nick

== See also ==
The Range Busters series:

- The Range Busters (1940)
- Trailing Double Trouble (1940)
- West of Pinto Basin (1940)
- Trail of the Silver Spurs (1941)
- The Kid's Last Ride (1941)
- Tumbledown Ranch in Arizona (1941)
- Wrangler's Roost (1941)
- Fugitive Valley (1941)
- Saddle Mountain Roundup (1941)
- Tonto Basin Outlaws (1941)
- Underground Rustlers (1941)
- Thunder River Feud (1942)
- Rock River Renegades (1942)
- Boot Hill Bandits (1942)
- Texas Trouble Shooters (1942)
- Arizona Stage Coach (1942)
- Texas to Bataan (1942)
- Trail Riders (1942)
- Two Fisted Justice (1943)
- Haunted Ranch (1943)
- Land of Hunted Men (1943)
- Cowboy Commandos (1943)
- Black Market Rustlers (1943)
- Bullets and Saddles (1943)
