= Danger Valley =

1937 film by Robert N. Bradbury

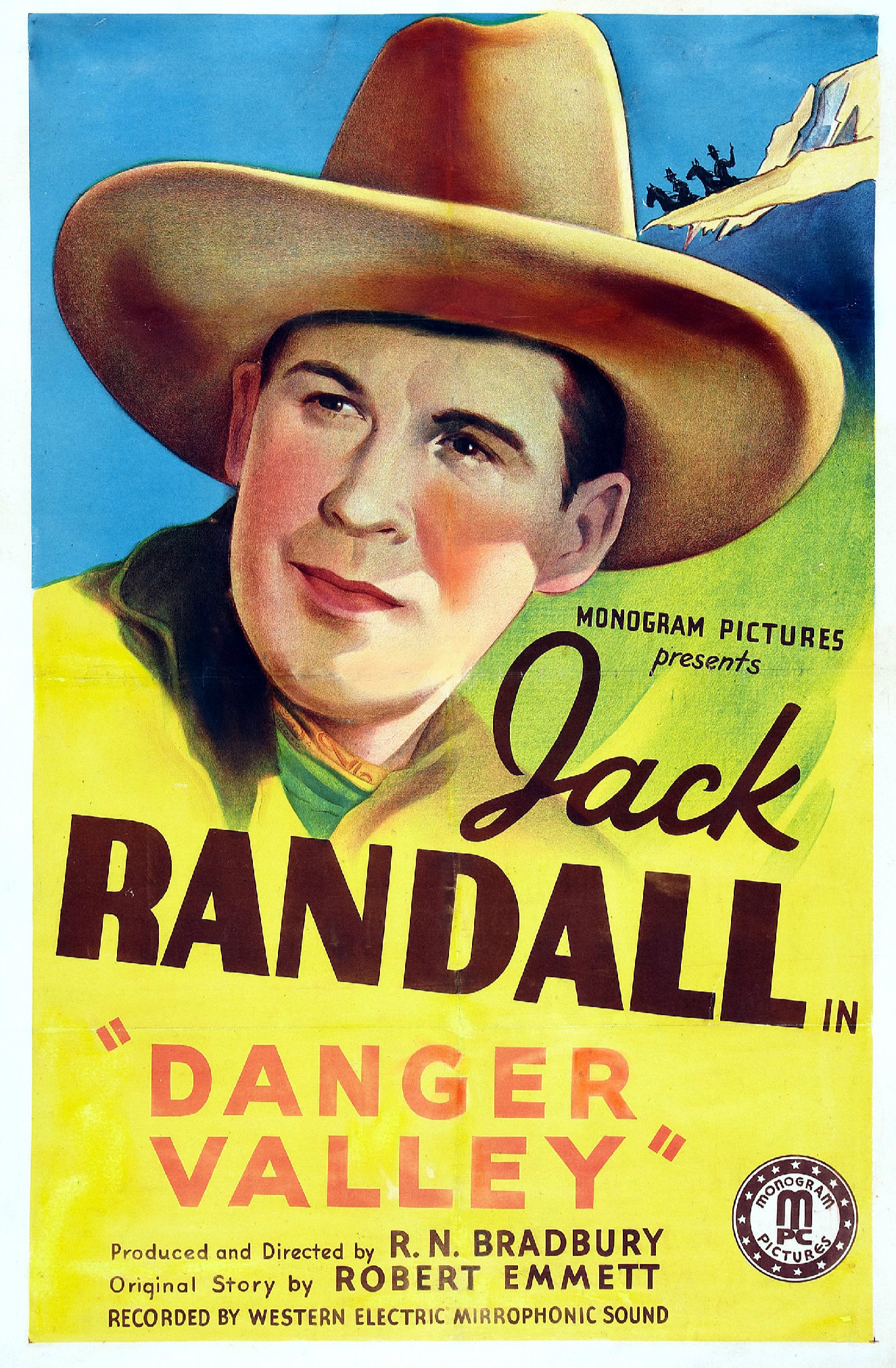
- Theatrical release poster
- Directed by: Robert N. Bradbury
- Screenplay by: Robert Emmett
- Story by: Robert Emmett
- Produced by: Robert N. Bradbury; Scott R. Dunlap (executive producer)
- Starring: Jack Randall
- Cinematography: Bert Longenecker
- Edited by: Howard Dillinger
- Production company: Monogram Pictures
- Distributed by: Monogram Pictures
- Release date: November 3, 1937
- Running time: 58 minutes
- Country: United States
- Language: English

Danger Valley is a 1937 American Western film released by Monogram Pictures, directed by Robert N. Bradbury, written by Robert Emmett Tansey (as "Robert Emmett") and starring Addison Randall (credited as "Jack Randall") as a singing cowboy.

== Plot ==
Prospectors working for a man named Temple strike a rich gold vein in a remote valley. They send one of their own, Jake, to the county recorder's office to file the official claim and secure their rights to the discovery. Ruthless claim-jumper Dana (Charles King) happens to be in the recorder's office and overhears the news of the gold strike. Dana and his gang ambush and murder Jake on the trail, then forge new deeds to fraudulently transfer ownership of the valuable mining claims to themselves. With the forged documents in hand, Dana moves to evict the rightful miners and prospectors from their diggings, using intimidation, force, and legal trickery to seize control of the gold-rich property for himself.

Jack Bruce (Jack Randall), a wandering singing cowboy, befriends the honest miners and learns of the injustice. Using his wits, gun skills, and musical interludes, Bruce works to expose Dana's crimes, recover the legitimate claims, protect the prospectors from further violence, and bring the outlaws to justice.

== Cast ==
- Addison Randall as Jack Bruce
- Lois Wilde as Mickey Temple
- Hal Price as Sidekick Lucky
- Charles King as Dana
- Earl Dwire as Hardrock
- Ernie Adams as Soapy
- Jimmy Aubrey as Australia
- Ed Brady as Jake Reed
- Frank LaRue as Pappy Temple
- Chick Hannon as Joe
- Helen Gibson as Nana Temple
- Merrill McCormick as Henchman

== Soundtrack ==
- Addison Randall - "On the Wide Open Plains" (Written by Johnny Lange and Fred Stryker)
- Addison Randall - "Little Tenderfoot" (Written by Johnny Lange and Fred Stryker)
