= Jack Randall (actor) =

American actor (1906–1945)

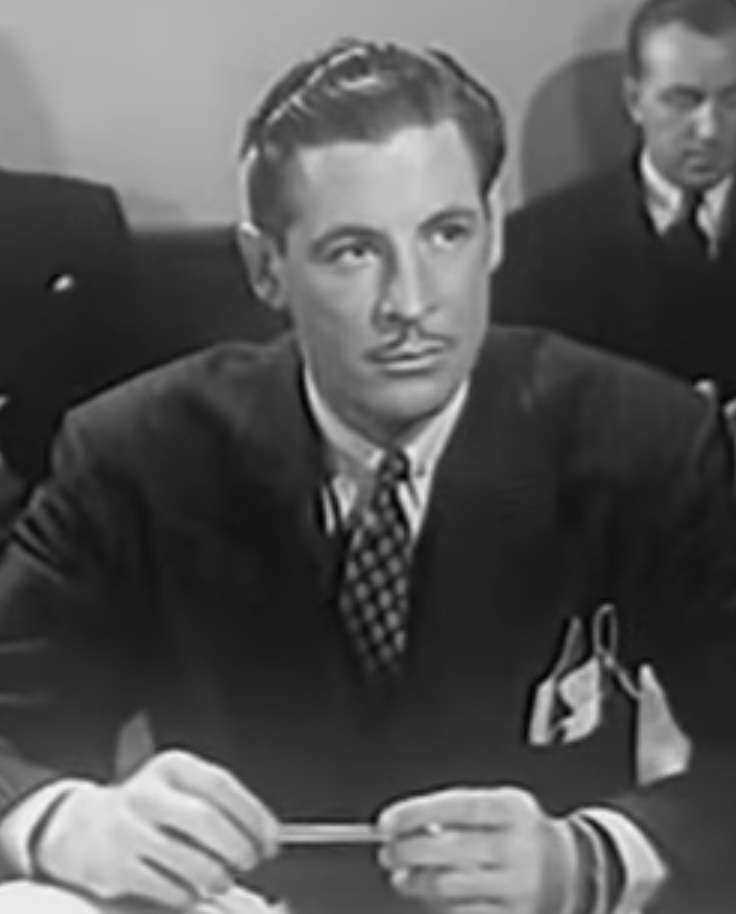
- Randall in Girls in Chains (1943)
- Born: Addison Byron Owen Randall; May 12, 1906; San Fernando, California, U.S.
- Died: July 16, 1945 (aged 39); Canoga Park, California, U.S.
- Resting place: Forest Lawn Memorial Park, Glendale, California
- Other names: Allen Byron; Byron Vance
- Years active: 1933–1943
- Spouse(s): Louise Stanley (m. 19??; div. 19??) Barbara Bennett (m. 1941)
- Relatives: Robert Livingston (brother)

Addison Byron Owen Randall (May 12, 1906 – July 16, 1945) was an American film actor, chiefly in Westerns. He often used a pseudonym for his film work, chiefly Jack Randall, and he played roles as Allen Byron and Byron Vance.

== Early life ==
Randall was born May 12, 1906, in San Fernando, California. He attended Kemper Military School in Boonville, Missouri. The reference book Who's Who in Hollywood gives Randall's place of birth as Quincy, Illinois.

== Film career ==
Randall began his career as a supporting actor and foil at RKO, but he left when Monogram Pictures promised him the chance to star in films. They were true to their word, and he appeared in a series of Western films through the 1930s and 1940s. (In 1935, he actually played a star of Westerns in RKO's Another Face, released in 1935.)

Many of Randall's early B-movies with Monogram feature him as a singing cowboy, but his later roles were generally straight Western stories, and all were hampered by the low budgets typical of this studio. Many of his cowboy characters were named "Jack". His older brother Robert Livingston (born Robert Edward Randall) was also an actor in Western films of the time.

Randall adopted his new "Allen Byron" identity in the 1940s in an effort to boost his fading professional fortunes, but the roles he received with new studio Producers Releasing Corporation were not up to the task.

== Death ==
He died unexpectedly in 1945 while filming a serial called The Royal Mounted Rides Again for Universal Studios, after a fall from a horse at Canoga Park, California, in which he struck a tree. Some sources attribute his death to injuries sustained during the fall, which in those versions resulted from an attempt to recover a hat he had dropped, while others state that he suffered a fatal heart attack before falling. He is interred at Forest Lawn Memorial Park in Glendale, California, in the Garden of Memory, near his older brother, Robert Livingston.

== Personal life ==
Randall twice married and divorced actress Louise Stanley, and carried on an affair with former silent film actress Louise Brooks. At the time of his death, he was married to his second wife, actress Barbara Bennett, sister of actresses Constance Bennett and Joan Bennett.

== Partial filmography ==
- His Family Tree (1935) as Mike Donovan
- Another Face (1935) as Tex Williams
- Two in the Dark (1936) as Duke Reed
- Love on a Bet (1936) as Jackson
- Mariners of the Sky (1936) aka Navy Born as Lt. Tex Jones
- Don't Turn 'Em Loose (1936) as Al - Henchman
- Red Lights Ahead (1936) as Nordingham
- Flying Hostess (1936) as Earl Spencer
- Danger Valley (1937) as Jack Bruce
- Stars Over Arizona (1937) as Jack Dawson
- Riders of the Dawn (1937) as Marshal Josh Preston
- Blazing Barriers (1937) as Arthur Forsythe
- Wild Horse Canyon (1938) as Jack Gray
- Gun Packer (1938) as Jack Denton
- The Mexicali Kid (1938) as Jack Wood
- Man's Country (1938) as Jack Haid
- Gunsmoke Trail (1938) as Jack Lane
- Land of Fighting Men (1938) as Jack Lambert
- Where the West Begins (1938) as Jack Manning
- Overland Mail (1939) as Jack Mason
- Oklahoma Terror (1939) as Jack Ridgley
- Across the Plains (1939) as Jack Winters, Cherokee
- Trigger Smith (1939) as Jack 'Trigger' Smith aka Arizona Jones
- Drifting Westward (1939) as Jack Martin
- Riders from Nowhere (1940) as Jack Rankin
- Wild Horse Range (1940) as Jack Wallace
- The Kid from Santa Fe (1940) as Santa Fe Kid
- Land of the Six Guns (1940) as Jack Rowan
- Covered Wagon Trails (1940) as Jack Cameron
- The Cheyenne Kid (1940) as The Cheyenne Kid
- Pioneer Days (1940) as Jack Dunham
- High Explosive (1943) as Joe
- Girls in Chains (1943) as Johnny Moon
- Danger! Women at Work (1943) as Danny
- Cry 'Havoc' (1943) as Lt. Thomas Holt
