= The Cheyenne Kid (1940 film) =

1940 film

- Theatrical release poster
- Directed by: Raymond K. Johnson
- Screenplay by: Tom Gibson
- Produced by: Harry S. Webb
- Starring: Jack Randall; Louise Stanley; Kenne Duncan; Frank Yaconelli; Reed Howes; Charles King
- Cinematography: Edward A. Kull
- Edited by: Robert Golden
- Production company: Monogram Pictures
- Distributed by: Monogram Pictures
- Release date: February 20, 1940
- Running time: 50 minutes
- Country: United States
- Language: English

The Cheyenne Kid is a 1940 American Western film directed by Raymond K. Johnson and written by Tom Gibson. The film stars Jack Randall, Louise Stanley, Kenne Duncan, Frank Yaconelli, Reed Howes and Charles King. The film was released on February 20, 1940, by Monogram Pictures.

== Plot ==
After renouncing gambling, the Cheyenne Kid is appointed foreman of his ranch and entrusted with the purchase of livestock from a ranch owned by Ruth and Chet Adams. However, the Adams ranch is heavily indebted to Jeff Baker, who is determined to prevent the transaction from being completed. To obstruct the deal, Baker dispatches two hired men to interfere by any means necessary.

== Cast ==
- Jack Randall as The Cheyenne Kid
- Louise Stanley as Ruth Adams
- Kenne Duncan as Chet Adams
- Frank Yaconelli as Manuel
- Reed Howes as Jeff Baker
- Charles King as Carson
- George Chesebro as Davis
- Forrest Taylor as Sheriff
- Ed Brady as Farnum
- Lafe McKee as Roberts
