= Desert Phantom =

1936 film by S. Roy Luby

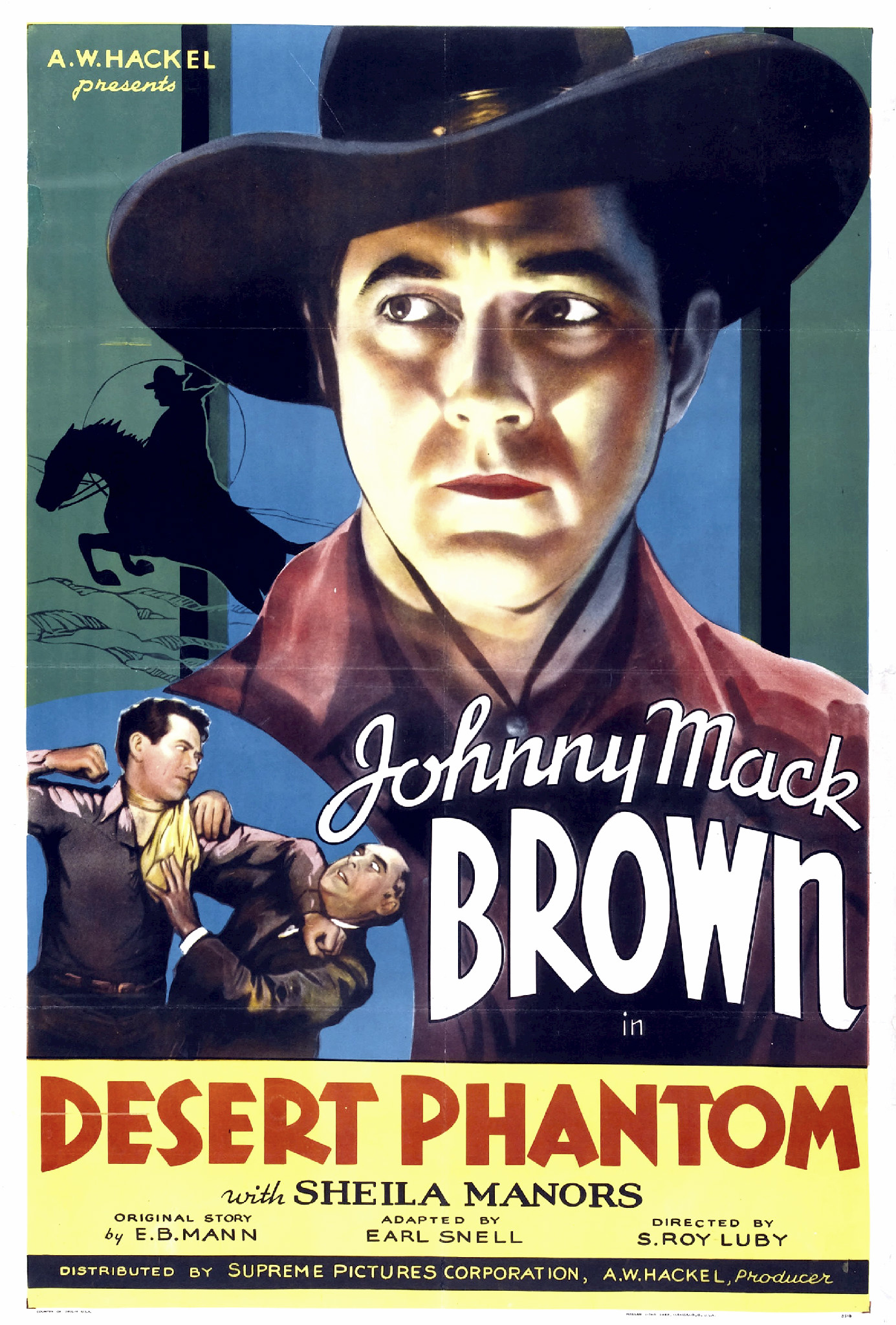
- Theatrical release poster
- Directed by: S. Roy Luby
- Written by: E.B. Mann (original story); Earle Snell (screen adaptation)
- Starring: See below
- Cinematography: Bert Longenecker
- Edited by: S. Roy Luby
- Release date: March 10, 1936
- Running time: 60 minutes
- Country: United States
- Language: English

Desert Phantom is a 1936 American Western film directed by S. Roy Luby.

== Cast ==
- Johnny Mack Brown as Billy Donovan
- Sheila Bromley as Jean Haloran
- Ted Adams as Salizar
- Karl Hackett as Tom Jackson
- Hal Price as Jim Day
- Nelson McDowell as "Doc" Simpson
- Charles King as Henchman Dan

== Critical reception ==
Variety described Desert Phantom as "a formula film" with "the usual stuff about western villains, a stranger hero, an innocent suspect and one pretty blonde." It concluded that it was no better or worse than many films of its type and that it should "satisfy in the trade for which the film is created, the multiple feature bills."
