= Monte Rawlins =

American actor

- Born: Dean Calvin Spencer; February 21, 1907; Yakima, Washington
- Died: July 13, 1988 (aged 81); Hawaii
- Occupation: Film actor

Monte Rawlins, born Dean Calvin Spencer (February 21, 1907 – July 13, 1988), also called Monte "Alamo" Rawlins, was a short-lived western film star of the late 1930s, often dubbed The Masked Phantom due to his better known role. The B-rated "Masked Phantom" role was his only starring role.

In the late 1930s, Columbia Pictures had been searching for a new face to be a new cowboy western star. They were having success with several, including Ken Maynard and Bill Elliott. Originally from Yakima, Washington, Rawlins had made his way to Hollywood by way of him being a barnstormer pilot, starring in an air show. He first worked doing aerial stunt work for films, and played two small bit roles in films, and was noticed by Columbia and approached for his own series. The series, titled Adventures of the Masked Phantom, opened in 1939, with Rawlins in the lead role.

The series was to have a trio that travels, rescuing people as they go, overcoming troubles and dangers that they encounter along the way. Reviews were not bad, but indicated that veteran actors George Douglas, and Curley Dresden had saved the series. Rawlins' reviews were horrible—it would be his last acting role.

At the beginning of World War II, Rawlins joined the US Marine Corps, and served with distinction until the war's end. He remained in the US Marine Reserves, and was called up for active duty for the Korean War also. He remained in the Marine Reserves, and began working, upon his return from Korea, as a sound engineer for both Monogram Pictures and Disney. He retired from both Disney and the Marine Reserves, moving to Hawaii, where he later died of natural causes in 1988.
