= Riders of the Dawn (1937 film) =

1937 film

- Directed by: Robert N. Bradbury
- Written by: Robert Emmett Tansey
- Produced by: Robert N. Bradbury
- Starring: Jack Randall; Kathryn Keys; Warner Richmond
- Cinematography: Bert Longenecker
- Edited by: Fred Bain
- Music by: Frank Sanucci
- Production company: Monogram Pictures
- Distributed by: Monogram Pictures
- Release date: July 14, 1937
- Running time: 55 minutes
- Country: United States
- Language: English

Riders of the Dawn is a 1937 American Western film directed by Robert N. Bradbury and starring Jack Randall, Kathryn Keys and Warner Richmond.

== Cast ==
- Jack Randall as Marshal Jack Preston
- Kathryn Keys as Jean Porter
- Warner Richmond as Jim Danti
- George Cooper as Grizzly Ike
- James Sheridan as Henchman Pinto
- Earl Dwire as Two-Gun Gardner
- Lloyd Ingraham as Dad Moran
- Ed Brady as Henchman Breed
- Ella McKenzie as Dance Hall Girl
- Forrest Taylor as Brady
- Frank Hagney as Henchman Butch
- Chief Dark Hawk as Indian Joe
- Tim Davis as Dad Moran's son (uncredited)

== Critical reception ==
Variety criticised the film's production values, particularly the sound synchronisation, and wrote, "Bad timing of the sound makes the supposed singing from the saddle ridiculously bad." It described the narrative as "jumpy" in the first half as details were sacrificed for brevity but said some of the action scenes were "well done."

== Bibliography ==
- James Robert Parish & Michael R. Pitts. Film directors: a guide to their American films. Scarecrow Press, 1974.
