= Robert Emmett Tansey =

American actor

- Born: June 28, 1897; Brooklyn, NY, United States
- Died: June 17, 1951 (aged 53); Los Angeles, CA, United States
- Other names: Al Aly, Charles Anders, Robert Emmet, Robert Emmett, John Foster, Craig Hutchinson, Frank Koops, Al Lane, Richard J. Pearl, Frank Simpson, Robert E. Tansey, Robert Tansey, Bert Tansey, Bob Tansey, Bobby Tansey, Bobbie Tansey
- Occupations: Producer, director, writer, actor
- Years active: 1911–1951 (film)

Robert Emmett Tansey (June 28, 1897 – June 17, 1951) was an American actor, screenwriter, film producer and director. He was active in cinema in various roles from the 1910s to the 1950s. He was credited under at least 15 pseudonyms, such as Charles Anders, John Foster, Al Lane or Frank Simpson. Tansey died in Hollywood at age 53.

== Selected filmography ==
- Riding to Fame (1927)
- Romance of the West (1930)
- Riders of the Rio (1931)
- The Way of the West (1934)
- Badge of Honor (1934)
- Paradise Canyon (1935)
- Courage of the North (1935)
- Timber Terrors (1935)
- Westward Ho (1935)
- Song of the Gringo (1936)
- Pinto Rustlers (1936)
- Where Trails Divide (1937)
- Riders of the Dawn (1937)
- Gun Packer (1938)
- The Painted Trail (1938)
- Trigger Smith (1939)
- Man from Texas (1939)
- Overland Mail (1939)
- Across the Plains (1939), producer and screenwriter
- Take Me Back to Oklahoma (1940)
- The Golden Trail (1940)
- Lone Star Law Men (1941)
- Dynamite Canyon (1941)
- Silver Stallion (1941)
- The Pioneers (1941)
- The Driftin' Kid (1941)
- Western Mail (1942)
- Texas to Bataan (1942)
- Trail Riders (1942)
- Where Trails End (1942)
- Two Fisted Justice (1943)
- Death Valley Rangers (1943)
- Harmony Trail (1944)
- Song of Old Wyoming (1945)
- Romance of the West (1946)
- The Caravan Trail (1946)
- Colorado Serenade (1946)
- Tumbleweed Trail (1946)
- Driftin' River (1946)
- Stars Over Texas (1946)
- Wild West (1946)
- The Enchanted Valley (1948)
- Shaggy (1948)
- Forbidden Jungle (1950)
- The Fighting Stallion (1950)
- Federal Man (1950)
- Cattle Queen (1951)
- Badman's Gold (1951)

== Bibliography ==
- Michael R. Pitts. Poverty Row Studios, 1929–1940: An Illustrated History of 55 Independent Film Companies, with a Filmography for Each. McFarland & Company, 2005.
