= List of Western films of the 1930s =

A list of Western films released in the 1930s.

Title	Director	Cast	Country	Subgenre/Notes
1930
The Arizona Kid	Alfred Santell	Warner Baxter, Mona Maris, Carole Lombard	United States	traditional Western
The Bad Man	Clarence G. Badger	Walter Huston, Dorothy Revier, James Rennie	United States	traditional Western
The Big Trail	Raoul Walsh	John Wayne, Marguerite Churchill, El Brendel, Tully Marshall, Tyrone Power Sr.	United States	epic Western
Billy the Kid	King Vidor	Johnny Mack Brown, Wallace Beery, Kay Johnson	United States	traditional Western
Call of the West	Albert Ray	Dorothy Revier, Matt Moore	United States	B Western
Captain Thunder	Alan Crosland	Fay Wray, Victor Varconi	United States	traditional Western
The Dawn Trail	Christy Cabanne	Buck Jones, Miriam Seegar, Charles Morton	United States	B Western
The Girl of the Golden West	John Francis Dillon	Ann Harding, James Rennie, Harry Bannister	United States	traditional Western
Hell's Heroes	William Wyler	Charles Bickford, Raymond Hatton, Fred Kohler	United States	traditional Western
The Lash	Frank Lloyd	Richard Barthelmess, Mary Astor, Fred Kohler, Marian Nixon, James Rennie	United States	traditional Western
The Last of the Duanes	Alfred L. Werker	George O'Brien, Myrna Loy, Lucile Brown, Walter McGrail, Clara Blandick	United States	traditional Western
The Lone Defender	Richard Thorpe	Walter Miller, June Marlowe	United States	traditional Western
The Lone Rider	Louis King	Buck Jones, Vera Reynolds	United States	B Western
Men of the North	Hal Roach	Gilbert Roland, Barbara Leonard, Arnold Korff	United States	Northern Western
Men Without Law	Louis King	Buck Jones, Carmelita Geraghty	United States	B Western
Montana Moon	Malcolm St. Clair	Joan Crawford, Johnny Mack Brown, Dorothy Sebastian, Ricardo Cortez, Benny Rubin	United States	traditional Western
River's End	Michael Curtiz	Charles Bickford, Evalyn Knapp	United States	traditional Western
Shadow Ranch	Louis King	Buck Jones, Marguerite De La Motte	United States	traditional Western
Song of the West	Ray Enright	John Boles, Vivienne Segal, Joe E. Brown	United States	musical Western
The Spoilers	Edwin Carewe	Gary Cooper, Kay Johnson	United States	Northern Western
Under a Texas Moon	Michael Curtiz	Frank Fay, Raquel Torres, Myrna Loy	United States	traditional Western
Way Out West	Fred Niblo	William Haines, Leila Hyams, Polly Moran, Ralph Bushman	United States	B Western
Whoopee	Thornton Freeland	Eddie Cantor, Ethel Shutta, Eleanor Hunt	United States	comedy/musical Western
1931
Border Law	Louis King	Buck Jones, Lupita Tovar	United States	B Western
Branded	D. Ross Lederman	Buck Jones, Wallace MacDonald, Philo McCullough	United States	B Western
Cimarron	Wesley Ruggles	Richard Dix, Irene Dunne, Estelle Taylor, Nance O'Neil	United States	traditional Western
The Cisco Kid	Irving Cummings	Warner Baxter, Edmund Lowe	United States	The Cisco Kid serial Western
The Deadline	Lambert Hillyer	Buck Jones, Loretta Sayers	United States	B Western
Desert Vengeance	Louis King	Buck Jones, Barbara Bedford	United States	B Western
Fighting Caravans	Otto Brower, David Burton	Gary Cooper, Lili Damita, Ernest Torrence, Tully Marshall	United States	traditional Western
The Fighting Marshal	D. Ross Lederman	Tim McCoy, Dorothy Gulliver, Matthew Betz	United States	B Western
The Fighting Sheriff	Louis King	Buck Jones, Loretta Sayers	United States	B Western
The Great Meadow	Charles Brabin	Johnny Mack Brown, Eleanor Boardman	United States	traditional Western
The Hard Hombre	Otto Bower	Hoot Gibson, Lina Basquette, Mathilde Comont	United States	traditional Western
Law of the Rio Grande	Bennett Ray Cohen, Forest Sheldon	Nelson McDowell, Bob Custer, Edmund Cobb	United States	traditional Western
Mounted Fury	Stuart Paton	John Bowers, Blanche Mehaffey, Frank Rice	United States	Northern Western
The Nevada Buckaroo	John P. McCarthy	Bob Steele, Dorothy Dix, Ed Brady, George "Gabby" Hayes	United States	traditional Western
One Man Law	Lambert Hillyer	Buck Jones, Shirley Grey, Robert Ellis	United States	B Western
The One Way Trail	Ray Taylor	Tim McCoy, Doris Hill	United States	B Western
Pueblo Terror	Alan James	Jay Wilsey, Jack Harvey, Wanda Hawley Yakima Canutt	United States	traditional Western
The Range Feud	D. Ross Lederman	Buck Jones, John Wayne, Susan Fleming, Edward LeSaint	United States	B Western
Shotgun Pass	J. P. McGowan	Tim McCoy, Virginia Lee Corbin	United States	B Western
The Squaw Man	Cecil B. DeMille	Warner Baxter, Lupe Vélez	United States	traditional Western
The Texas Ranger	D. Ross Lederman	Buck Jones, Carmelita Geraghty, Harry Woods, Ed Brady	United States	B Western
The Avenger	Roy William Neill	Buck Jones, Dorothy Revier	United States	B Western
Woman Hungry	Clarence G. Badger	Sidney Blackmer, Lila Lee, Raymond Hatton, Fred Kohler, Kenneth Thomson	United States	traditional Western
1932
The Big Stampede	Tenny Wright	John Wayne, Noah Beery, Paul Hurst, Mae Madison	United States	B Western
The Conquerors	William A. Wellman	Richard Dix, Ann Harding	United States	traditional Western
Cornered	B. Reeves Eason	Tim McCoy, Shirley Grey	United States	B Western
Daring Danger	D. Ross Lederman	Tim McCoy, Alberta Vaughn, Wallace MacDonald	United States	B Western
Destry Rides Again	Benjamin Stoloff	Tom Mix, Claudia Dell	United States	B Western
The Drifter	William A. O'Connor	William Farnum, Noah Beery, Phyllis Barrington, Charles Sellon	United States	
End of the Trail	D. Ross Lederman	Tim McCoy, Luana Walters	United States	B Western
The Fighting Fool	Lambert Hillyer	Tim McCoy, Marceline Day	United States	B Western
Fighting for Justice	Otto Brower	Tim McCoy, Joyce Compton	United States	B Western
Flaming Guns	Arthur Rosson	Tom Mix, William Farnum	United States	B Western
Forbidden Trail	Lambert Hillyer	Buck Jones, Barbara Weeks	United States	B Western
The Gay Cabllero	Alfred L. Werker	George O'Brien, Victor McLaglen, Conchita Montenegro	United States	B Western
The Golden West	David Howard	George O'Brien, Janet Chandler, Marion Burns	United States	B Western
Hell Fire Austin	Forrest Sheldon	Ken Maynard, Nat Pendleton, Alan Roscoe	United States	
Hello Trouble	Lambert Hillyer	Buck Jones, Lina Basquette	United States	B Western
Heritage of the Desert	Henry Hathaway	Randolph Scott, Sally Blane	United States	B Western
Haunted Gold	Mack V. Wright	John Wayne, Raymond Hatton	United States	B Western
Hidden Gold	Arthur Rosson	John Wayne, Sheila Terry	United States	serial Western
Hidden Valley	Robert N. Bradbury	Bob Steele, Gertrude Messinger, Francis McDonald, Ray Hallor, John Elliott, Arthur Millett, V.L. Barnes, George "Gabby" Hayes, Joe De La Cruz, Dick Dickinson	United States	singing cowboy Western
Ridin' for Justice	D. Ross Lederman	Buck Jones, Mary Doran, Russell Simpson	United States	B Western
Honor of the Mounted	Harry L. Fraser	Tom Tyler, Stanley Blystone, Francis McDonald	United States	Northern Western
Law and Order	Edward L. Cahn	Walter Huston, Harry Carey, Russell Hopton, Andy Devine	United States	traditional Western
Mark of the Spur	J.P. McGowan	Bob Custer, Lillian Rich, Franklyn Farnum	United States	traditional Western
Mason of the Mounted	Harry L. Fraser	Bill Cody, LeRoy Mason, Andy Shuford	United States	Northern Western
McKenna of the Mounted	D. Ross Lederman	Buck Jones, Greta Granstedt, Walter McGrail	United States	B Western
Men of America	Ralph Ince	William Boyd, Charles "Chic" Sale, Dorothy Wilson	United States	B Western
My Pal, the King	Kurt Neumann	Tom Mix, Mickey Rooney	United States	
Mystery Ranch	David Howard	George O'Brien, Cecilia Parker	United States	B Western
Partners	Fred Allen	Tom Keene, nancy Drexel	United States	B Western
The Rainbow Trail	David Howard	George O'Brien, Cecilia Parker	United States	B Western
Renegades of the West	Casey Robinson	Tom Keene, Roscoe Ates	United States	B Western
Ride Him, Cowboy	Fred Allen	John Wayne, Frank Hagney	United States	B Western
Ridin' for Justice	D. Ross Lederman	Buck Jones, Mary Doran, Russell Simpson	United States	B Western
The Riding Tornado	D. Ross Lederman	Tim McCoy, Shirley Grey	United States	B Western
Robbers' Roost	Louis King	George O'Brien, Maureen O'Sullivan	United States	B Western
The Saddle Buster	Fred Allen	Tom Keene, Helen Foster	United States	B Western
South of the Rio Grande	Lambert Hillyer	Buck Jones, Mona Maris, Philo McCullough	United States	B Western
Sundown Rider	Lambert Hillyer	Buck Jones, Barbara Weeks	United States	B Western
The Tenderfoot	Ray Enright	Joe E. Brown, Ginger Rogers, Lew Cody	United States	comedy Western
Texas Cyclone	D. Ross Lederman	Tim McCoy, Shirley Grey	United States	B Western
The Texas Tornado	Oliver Drake	Lane Chandler, Doris Hill, Ben Corbett, Yakima Canutt	United States	traditional Western
Two-Fisted Law	D. Ross Lederman	Tim Holt, Walter Brennan, John Wayne	United States	B Western
The Vanishing Frontier	Phil Rosen	Johnny Mack Brown, Evalyn Knapp, ZaSu Pitts, Raymond Hatton	United States	B Western
The Western Code	John P. McCarthy	Tim McCoy, Nora Lane, Mischa Auer	United States	B Western
White Eagle	Lambert Hillyer	Buck Jones, Barbara Weeks, Robert Ellis	United States	B Western
Wild Girl	Raoul Walsh	Charles Farrell, Joan Bennett, Ralph Bellamy	United States	traditional Western
Wild Horse Mesa	Henry Hathaway	Randolph Scott, Sally Blane, Fred Kohler	United States	B Western
1933
The California Trail	Lambert Hillyer	Buck Jones, Helen Mack, Luis Alberni, George Humbert	United States	B Western
The Fighting Code	Lambert Hillyer	Buck Jones, Diane Sinclair	United States	B Western
Gordon of Ghost City	Ray Taylor	Buck Jones, Madge Bellamy, Walter Miller, Tom Ricketts	United States	serial Western
King of the Wild Horses	Earl Haley	Rex the King of Wild Horses	United States	B Western
Lone Cowboy	Paul Sloane	Jackie Cooper, Lila Lee, Addison Richards	United States	traditional Western
Man of Action	George Melford	Tim McCoy, Caryl Lincoln	United States	B Western
Phantom Thunderbolt	Alan James	Ken Maynard, Frances Lee, Frank Rice, William Gould	United States	traditional Western
Riders of Destiny	Robert N. Bradbury	John Wayne, Cecilia Parker, Forrest Taylor, George "Gabby" Hayes, Yakima Canutt	United States	traditional Western
Rusty Rides Alone	D. Ross Lederman	Tim McCoy, Silver King the Dog	United States	B Western
Sagebrush Trail	Armand Schaefer	John Wayne, Lane Chandler, Yakima Canutt	United States	traditional Western
Secrets	Frank Borzage	Mary Pickford, Leslie Howard	United States	traditional Western
Silent Men	D. Ross Lederman	Tim McCoy, Florence Britton	United States	B Western
Son of the Border	Lloyd Nosler	Tom Keene, Julie Haydon, Edgar Kennedy, Lon Chaney Jr.	United States	traditional Western
The Thrill Hunter	George B. Seitz	Buck Jones, Dorothy Revier	United States	B Western
Treason	George B. Seitz	Buck Jones, Shirley Grey, Robert Ellis	United States	B Western
Under the Tonto Rim	Henry Hathaway	Stuart Erwin, Fred Kohler, Raymond Hatton	United States	cattle drive Western
Unknown Valley	Lambert Hillyer	Buck Jones, Cecilia Parker	United States	B Western
The Whirlwind	D. Ross Lederman	Tim McCoy, Alice Dahl	United States	B Western
1934
Belle of the Nineties	Leo McCarey	Mae West, Roger Pryor, John Mack Brown	United States	comedy Western
Blue Steel	Robert N. Bradbury	John Wayne, Eleanor Hunt, George "Gabby" Hayes	United States	traditional Western
Cowboy Holiday	Robert F. Hill	Guinn "Big Boy" Williams, Janet Chandler, Julian Rivero	United States	traditional Western
The Fighting Ranger	George B. Seitz	Buck Jones, Dorothy Revier	United States	B Western
The Fighting Trooper	Ray Taylor	Kermit Maynard, Barbara Worth, LeRoy Mason	United States	Northern Western
Frontier Marshal	Lewis Seiler	George O'Brien, Irene Bentley	United States	traditional Western
Honor of the Range	Alan James	Ken Maynard, Cecilia Parker, Fred Kohler	United States	traditional Western
The Last Round-Up	Henry Hathaway	Randolph Scott, Barbara Fritchie	United States	traditional Western
Laughing Boy	W.S. Van Dyke	Ramon Novarro, Lupe Vélez	United States	traditional Western
The Lawless Frontier	Robert N. Bradbury	John Wayne, Sheila Terry, Jack Rockwell, George "Gabby" Hayes, Yakima Canutt	United States	traditional Western
The Lucky Texan	Robert N. Bradbury	John Wayne, Barbara Sheldon, Lloyd Whitlock, George "Gabby" Hayes, Yakima Canutt	United States	traditional Western
The Man Trailer	Lambert Hillyer	Buck Jones, Cecilia Parker	United States	B Western
Massacre	Alan Crosland	Richard Barthelmess, Ann Dvorak, Dudley Digges, Claire Dodd	United States	traditional Western
Mystery Mountain	Otto Brower, B. Reeves Eason	Ken Maynard, Verna Hillie, Syd Saylor	United States	Western serial
The Prescott Kid	David Selman	Tim McCoy, Sheila Bromley	United States	B Western
The Red Rider	Lew Landers	Buck Jones, Grant Withers, Marion Shilling, Walter Miller	United States	traditional Western serial
Ridin' Thru	Harry S. Webb	Tom Tyler, Ruth Hiatt, Lafe McKee, Ben Corbett	United States	traditional Western
The Star Packer	Robert N. Bradbury	John Wayne, George "Gabby" Hayes, Yakima Canutt	United States	traditional Western
Thunder Over Texas	Edgar G. Ulmer	Guinn "Big Boy" Williams, Helen Westcott, Philo McCullough	United States	contemporary B Western
The Trail Beyond	Robert N. Bradbury	John Wayne, Verna Hillie, Noah Beery, Noah Beery Jr.	United States	Northern Western
Undercover Men	Sam Newfield	Charles Starrett, Adrienne Dore, Kenne Duncan, Wheeler Oakman	Canada	B Western
Viva Villa!	Jack Conway	Wallace Beery, Leo Carrillo, Fay Wray, Donald Cook	United States	Mexico Western
Wagon Wheels	Charles Barton	Randolph Scott, Gail Patrick, Monte Blue	United States	traditional Western (remake of 'Fighting Caravans' with a new cast and stock footage)
When a Man Sees Red	Alan James	Buck Jones, Peggy Campbell, Dorothy Revier, LeRoy Mason	United States	traditional Western
When the Kellys Rode	Harry Southwell	Hay Simpson, John Appleton	Australia	Australian Western
The Westerner	David Selman	Tim McCoy, Marion Shilling	United States	B Western
West of the Divide	Robert N. Bradbury	John Wayne, Virginia Brown Faire, George "Gabby" Hayes	United States	traditional Western
The Man from Utah	Robert N. Bradbury	John Wayne, Polly Ann Young, Anita Campillo	United States	traditional Western
1935
Alias John Law	Robert N. Bradbury	Bob Steele, Buck Connors, Earl Dwire	United States	traditional Western
Annie Oakley	George Stevens	Barbara Stanwyck, Preston Foster, Melvyn Douglas, Moroni Olsen	United States	traditional Western
The Arizonian	Charles Vidor; Dewey Starkey	Richard Dix, Margot Grahame, Preston Foster	United States	traditional Western
Barbary Coast	Howard Hawks	Miriam Hopkins, Edward G. Robinson, Joel McCrea	United States	
Big Boy Rides Again	Albert Herman	Guinn "Big Boy" Williams, Constance Bergen, Charles K. French	United States	B Western
Border Brigands	Nick Grinde	Buck Jones, Lona Andre, Fred Kohler	United States	Northern Western
Border Vengeance	Ray Heinz	Reb Russell, Mary Jane Carey, Kenneth MacDonald	United States	traditional Western
Call of the Wild	William A. Wellman	Clark Gable, Loretta Young, Jack Oakie	United States	traditional Western
Code of the Mounted	Sam Newfield	Kermit Maynard, Robert Warwick, Jim Thorpe	United States	Northern Western
Coyote Trails	Bernard B. Ray	Tom Tyler, Alice Dahl, Ben Corbett, Lafe McKee	United States	traditional Western
The Crimson Trail	Alfred Raboch	Buck Jones, Polly Ann Young, Carl Stockdale, Ward Bond	United States	traditional Western
Danger Trails	Robert F. Hill	Guinn Williams, John Elliott, Marjorie Gordon	United States	traditional Western
The Dawn Rider	Robert N. Bradbury	John Wayne, Marion Burns, Dennis Moore, Reed Howes, Yakima Canutt	United States	traditional Western
Fighting Shadows	David Selman	Tim McCoy, Robert Allen, Geneva Mitchell	United States	B Western
Gallant Defender	David Selman	Charles Starrett, Joan Perry	United States	B Western
Heir to Trouble	Spencer Gordon Bennet	Ken Maynard, Joan Perry	United States	B Western
His Fighting Blood	John English	Kermit Maynard, Polly Ann Young, Paul Fix	United States	Northern Western
Hop-Along Cassidy	Howard Bretherton	William Boyd, James Ellison, Paula Stone, George "Gabby" Hayes	United States	traditional Western
Justice of the Range	David Selman	Tim McCoy, Billie Seward	United States	B Western
Law Beyond the Range	Ford Beebe	Tim McCoy, Billie Seward	United States	B Western
Lawless Range	Robert N. Bradbury	John Wayne, Sheila Bromley, Frank McGlynn, Jr., Jack Curtis	United States	traditional Western
Lawless Riders	Spencer Gordon Bennett	Ken Maynard, Geneva Mitchell	United States	B Western
Moonlight on the Prairie	D. Ross Lederman	Dick Foran, Sheila Bromley, George E. Stone, Joe Sawyer	United States	singing cowboy Western
The Miracle Rider	B. Reeves Eason, Armand Schaefer	Tom Mix, Joan Gale, Charles Middleton, Jason Robards Sr.	United States	traditional Western
The New Frontier	Carl Pierson	John Wayne, Muriel Evans, Warner Richmond	United States	traditional Western
Northern Frontier	Sam Newfield	Kermit Maynard, Eleanor Hunt, Russell Hopton	United States	Northern Western
Paradise Canyon	Carl L. Pierson	John Wayne, Marion Burns, Reed Howes	United States	traditional Western
The Phantom Empire	Otto Brower, B. Reeves Eason	Gene Autry, Frankie Darro, Betsy King Ross, Dorothy Christy	United States	singing cowboy science fiction serial Western
Rainbow Valley	Robert N. Bradbury	John Wayne, George "Gabby" Hayes, Lucile Browne, LeRoy Mason	United States	traditional Western
The Red Blood of Courage	John English	Kermit Maynard, Ann Sheridan, Reginald Barlow	United States	Northern Western
The Revenge Rider	David Selman	Tim McCoy, Robert Allen, Billie Seward	United States	B Western
Riding Wild	David Selman	Tim McCoy, Billie Seward	United States	B Western
Ruggles of Red Gap	Leo McCarey	Charles Laughton, Mary Boland, Charles Ruggles, ZaSu Pitts	United States	comedy Western
The Silent Code	Stuart Paton	Kane Richmond, Blanche Mehaffey	United States	Northern Western
Skull and Crown	Elmer Clifton	Rin Tin Tin, Jr., Regis Toomey, Jack Mulhall, Molly O'Day	United States	traditional canine Western
Square Shooter	David Selman	Tim McCoy, Jacqueline Wells	United States	B Western
Timber Terrors	Robert Emmett Tansey	John Preston	United States	Northern Western
Trails of the Wild	Sam Newfield	Kermit Maynard, Billie Sweard, Monte Blue	United States	Northern Western
Westward Ho	Robert N. Bradbury	John Wayne, Sheila Bromley, Frank McGlynn Jr.	United States	traditional Western
Western Courage	Spencer Gordon Bennet	Ken Maynard, Geneva Mitchell	United States	B Western
Western Frontier	Albert Herman	Ken Maynard, Lucile Browne	United States	B Western
Wilderness Mail	Forrest Sheldon	Kermit Maynard, Fred Kohler, Paul Hurst	United States	Northern Western
The Desert Trail	Lewis D. Collins	John Wayne, Mary Kornman, Paul Fix	United States	traditional Western
1936
Aces and Eights	Sam Newfield	Tim McCoy, Luana Walters, Rex Lease	United States	traditional Western
Aces Wild	Harry L. Fraser	Harry Carey, Sonny the Marvel Horse, Gertrude Messinger	United States	traditional Western
Avenging Waters	Spencer Gordon Bennet	Ken Maynard, Beth Marion	United States	B Western
Border Caballero	Sam Newfield	Tim McCoy, Lois January, Ralph Byrd	United States	B Western
The Cattle Thief	Spencer Gordon Bennet	Ken Maynard, Geneva Mitchell	United States	B Western
Cavalry	Robert N. Bradbury	Bob Steele, Frances Grant, Karl Hackett	United States	traditional Western
Code of the Range	Charles C. Coleman	Charles Starrett, Mary Blake	United States	B Western
The Cowboy Star	David Selman	Charles Starrett, Iris Meredith	United States	B Western
Custer's Last Stand	Elmer Clifton	Rex Lease, Lona Andre, William Farnum	United States	traditional Western serial
Dodge City Trail	Charles C. Coleman	Charles Starrett, Donald Grayson, Marion Weldon	United States	B Western
Empty Saddles	Lesley Selander	Buck Jones, Louise Brooks, Harvey Clark	United States	B Western
End of the Trail	Erle C. Kenton	Jack Holt, Louise Henry	United States	Traditional Western
The Fugitive Sheriff	Spencer Gordon Bennet	Ken Maynard, Beth Marion	United States	B Western
Ghost Patrol	Sam Newfield	Tim McCoy, Claudia Dell, Walter Miller	United States	Science-Fiction Western
Ghost-Town Gold	Joseph Kane	Robert Livingstone, Ray "Crash" Corrigan, Max Terhune	United States	The Three Mesquiteers serial Western
Heroes of the Range	Spencer Gordon Bennet	Ken Maynard, June Gale	United States	B Western
Hopalong Cassidy Returns	Nate Watt	William Boyd, George "Gabby" Hayes, Gail Sheridan	United States	traditional Western
Der Kaiser von Kalifornien	Luis Trenker	Luis Trenker, Viktoria von Ballasko, Werner Kunig	Nazi Germany	California Gold Rush Western
King of the Pecos	Joseph Kane	John Wayne, Muriel Evans, Cy Kendall, Yakima Canutt	United States	traditional Western
Klondike Annie	Raoul Walsh	Mae West, Victor McLaglen	United States	traditional Western
The Last of the Mohicans	George B. Seitz	Randolph Scott, Binnie Barnes, Henry Wilcoxon	United States	traditional Western
The Last Outlaw	Christy Cabanne	Harry Carey, Hoot Gibson, Henry B. Walthall	United States	traditional Western
Last of the Warrens	Robert N. Bradbury	Bob Steele, Margaret Marquis, Charles King	United States	B Western
The Lawless Nineties	Joseph Kane	John Wayne, Ann Rutherford, Harry Woods	United States	traditional Western
The Lonely Trail	Joseph Kane	John Wayne, Ann Rutherford, Sam Flint, Bob Kortman	United States	traditional Western
Man of the Frontier (aka 'Red River Valley')	B. Reeves Eason	Gene Autry, Smiley Burnette, Frances Grant	United States	Singing cowboy Western
The Mine with the Iron Door	David Howard	Richard Arlen, Cecilia Parker, Henry B. Walthall	United States	B Western
Miracle in the Sand	Richard Boleslawski	Chester Morris, Lewis Stone, Walter Brennan	United States	traditional Western
The Mysterious Avenger	David Selman	Charles Starrett, Joan Perry	United States	B Western
O'Malley of the Mounted	David Howard	George O'Brien, Irene Ware, Stanley Fields	United States	Northern Western
Phantom Patrol	Charles Hutchison	Kermit Maynard, Joan Barclay, Harry Worth	United States	Northern Western
The Phantom Rider	Ray Taylor	Buck Jones, Marla Shelton, Diane Gibson, Harry Woods	United States	traditional Western serial
The Plainsman	Cecil B. DeMille	Gary Cooper, Jean Arthur, James Ellison, Charles Bickford	United States	traditional Western
Rangle River	Clarence G. Badger	Victor Jory, Robert Coote	Australia	Outback Western
Ramona	Henry King	Loretta Young, Don Ameche	United States	traditional Western
Rio Grande Ranger	Spencer Gordon Bennet	Robert Allen, Iris Meredith	United States	B Western
Rip Roarin' Buckaroo	Robert F. Hill	Tom Tyler, Beth Marion, Sammy Cohen	United States	B Western
Rhythm on the Range	Norman Taurog	Bing Crosby, Frances Farmer, Bob Burns, Martha Raye	United States	traditional Western musical
Roarin' Lead	Sam Newfield, Mack V. Wright	Robert Livingstone, Ray "Crash" Corrigan, Max Terhune	United States	The Three Mesquiteers serial Western
Robin Hood of El Dorado	William A. Wellman	Warner Baxter, Ann Loring, Bruce Cabot	United States	traditional Western
Rose Marie	W.S. Van Dyke	Jeanette MacDonald, Nelson Eddy	United States	traditional Western musical
Secret Patrol	David Selman	Charles Starrett, Finis Barton, J.P. McGowan	United States	B Western
Stampede	Ford Beebe	Charles Starrett	United States	B Western
Sutter's Gold	James Cruze	Edward Arnold, Lee Tracy	United States	
The Texas Rangers	King Vidor	Fred MacMurray, Jack Oakie, Jean Parker, Lloyd Nolan George "Gabby" Hayes	United States	traditional Western
Three Godfathers	Richard Boleslawski	Chester Morris, Lewis Stone, Walter Brennan	United States	traditional Western
The Three Mesquiteers	Ray Taylor	Robert Livingstone, Ray "Crash" Corrigan, Syd Saylor	United States	The Three Mesquiteers serial Western
The Unknown Ranger	Spencer Gordon Bennet	Robert Allen, Martha Tibbetts	United States	B Western
Wildcat Trooper	Elmer Clifton	Kermit Maynard, Hobart Bosworth, Fuzzy Knight, Lois Wilde, Yakima Canutt	United States	Northern Western
Winds of the Wasteland	Mack V. Wright	John Wayne, Phyllis Fraser, Lew Kelly	United States	traditional Western
Yellowstone	Arthur Lubin	Henry Hunter, Judith Barrett, Andy Devine	United States	traditional Western
1937
The Bad Man of Brimstone	J. Walter Ruben	Wallace Beery, Virginia Bruce, Dennis O'Keefe	United States	traditional Western
Black Aces	Buck Jones	Buck Jones	United States	B Western
Born to the West	Charles Barton	John Wayne, Marsha Hunt, Johnny Mack Brown	United States	B Western
Come On, Cowboys	Joseph Kane	Robert Livingston, Ray "Crash" Corrigan, Max Terhune	United States	The Three Mesquiteers serial Western
Courage of the West	Joseph H. Lewis	Bob Baker, J. Farrell MacDonald, Lois January, Fuzzy Knight	United States	Singing cowboy
The Great Barrier	Milton Rosmer, Geoffrey Barkas	Richard Arlen, Antoinette Cellier, Barry MacKay, Lilli Palmer	United Kingdom	Canadian historical railway western
Gunsmoke Ranch	Mack V. Wright	Robert Livingston, Ray "Crash" Corrigan, Max Terhune	United States	The Three Mesquiteers serial Western
Harlem on the Prairie	Sam Newfield	Herb Jeffries, Spencer Williams	United States	Race Western
Headin' East	Ewing Scott	Buck Jones	United States	B Western
Heart of the Rockies	Joseph Kane	Robert Livingston, Ray "Crash" Corrigan, Max Terhune	United States	The Three Mesquiteers serial Western
Heroes of the Alamo	Harry Fraser	Earle Hodgins, Lane Chandler	United States	traditional Western
High, Wide and Handsome	Rouben Mamoulian	Irene Dunne, Randolph Scott, Dorothy Lamour	United States	musical Western
Hit the Saddle	Mack V. Wright	Robert Livingston, Ray "Crash" Corrigan, Max Terhune	United States	The Three Mesquiteers serial Western
Hittin' the Trail	Robert N. Bradbury	Tex Ritter, Jerry Bergh, Earl Dwire	United States	Singing cowboy Western
Hollywood Round-Up	Ewing Scott	Buck Jones	United States	B Western
Law of the Ranger	Spencer Gordon Bennet	Robert Allen, Elaine Shepard	United States	B Western
Mystery Range	Robert F. Hill	Tom Tyler, Jerry Bergh, Milburn Morante	United States	traditional Western
The Old Wyoming Trail	Folmar Blangsted	Charles Starrett, Donald Grayson	United States	B Western
One Man Justice	Leon Barsha	Charles Starrett, Barbara Weeks	United States	B Western
Outlaws of the Prairie	Sam Nelson	Charles Starrett, Donald Grayson	United States	B Western
The Painted Stallion	Alan James, Ray Taylor, William Witney	Ray Corrigan, Hoot Gibson, LeRoy Mason, Duncan Renaldo	United States	traditional Western serial
Range Defenders	Mack V. Wright	Robert Livingston, Ray "Crash" Corrigan, Max Terhune	United States	The Three Mesquiteers serial Western
Ranger Courage	Spencer Gordon Bennet	Robert Allen, Martha Tibbetts	United States	B Western
The Rangers Step In	Spencer Gordon Bennet	Robert Allen, Eleanor Stewart	United States	B Western
Reckless Ranger	Spencer Gordon Bennet	Robert Allen, Louise Samll	United States	B Western
Riders of the Dawn	Robert N. Bradbury	Addison Randall, Warner Richmond, George Cooper, Peggy Keys	United States	traditional Western
Riders of the Whistling Skull	Mack V. Wright	Robert Livingston, Ray "Crash" Corrigan, Max Terhune	United States	The Three Mesquiteers serial Western/Horror Western
The Silver Trail	Bernard B. Ray	Rex Lease, Mary Russell, Ed Cassidy	United States	
Sing, Cowboy, Sing	Robert N. Bradbury	Tex Ritter, Louise Stanley, Karl Hackett	United States	Singing cowboy Western
Tex Rides with the Boy Scouts	Ray Taylor	Tex Ritter, Forrest Taylor, Marjorie Reynolds	United States	Singing cowboy Western
Texas Trail	David Selman	William Boyd, Russell Hayden, George 'Gabby' Hayes	United States	Hopalong Cassidy Western
Trapped	Leon Barsha	Charles Starrett, Peggy Stratford	United States	B Western
The Trigger Trio	William Witney	Ray "Crash" Corrigan, Max Terhune, Ralph Byrd	United States	The Three Mesquiteers serial Western
Two-Fisted Sheriff	Leon Barsha	Charles Starrett, Barbara Weeks	United States	B Western
Two Gun Law	Leon Barsha	Charles Starrett, Peggy Stratford	United States	B Western
Way Out West	James W. Horne	Stan Laurel, Oliver Hardy, James Finlayson, Rosina Lawrence	United States	comedy Western
Wells Fargo	Frank Lloyd	Joel McCrea, Bob Burns, Frances Dee	United States	traditional Western
Westbound Mail	Folmar Blangsted	Charles Starrett, Rosalind Keith	United States	B Western
Wild and Woolly	Alfred L. Werker	Jane Withers, Walter Brennan, Pauline Moore	United States	comedy Western
Wild Horse Rodeo	George Sherman	Robert Livingston, Ray "Crash" Corrigan, Max Terhune	United States	The Three Mesquiteers serial Western
Zorro Rides Again	William Witney, John English	John Carroll, Duncan Renaldo, Noah Beery, Sr., Edmund Cobb	United States	epic Western
1938
Billy the Kid Returns	Joseph Kane	Roy Rogers, Smiley Burnette, Lynne Roberts, Morgan Wallace	United States	Singing cowboy Western
California Frontier	Elmer Clifton	Buck Jones, Carmen Bailey	United States	B Western
Call of the Rockies	Alan James	Charles Starrett, Donald Grayson	United States	B Western
Call the Mesquiteers	John English	Robert Livingston, Ray "Crash" Corrigan, Max Terhune	United States	The Three Mesquiteers serial Western
Cassidy of Bar 20	Lesley Selander	William Boyd, Russell Hayden, Frank Darien	United States	Hopalong Cassidy serial Western
Cattle Raiders	Sam Nelson	Charles Starrett, Donald Grayson, Iris Meredith	United States	B Western
The Colorado Trail	Sam Nelson	Charles Starrett, Iris Meredith	United States	B Western
Come On, Rangers	Joseph Kane	Roy Rogers, Lynne Roberts, Raymond Hatton	United States	Singing cowboy Western
Cowboy from Brooklyn	Lloyd Bacon	Pat O'Brien, Dick Powell, Priscilla Lane, Ann Sheridan	United States	musical comedy Western
The Cowboy and the Lady	H.C. Potter	Gary Cooper, Merle Oberon	United States	traditional Western
The Feud Maker	Sam Newfield	Bob Steele, Marion Weldon, Karl Hackett	United States	traditional Western
The Girl of the Golden West	Robert Z. Leonard	Jeanette MacDonald, Nelson Eddy, Walter Pidgeon	United States	musical Western
Gold Is Where You Find It	Michael Curtiz	George Brent, Olivia de Havilland, Claude Rains, Margaret Lindsay	United States	traditional Western
The Great Adventures of Wild Bill Hickok	Sam Nelson, Mack V. Wright	Wild Bill Elliott, Monte Blue, Carole Wayne, Frankie Darrio, Dickie Jones	United States	serial Western
Heart of the North	Lewis Seiler	Dick Foran, Gloria Dickson, Gale Page	United States	Northern Western
Heroes of the Hills	George Sherman	Robert Livingston, Ray "Crash" Corrigan, Max Terhune	United States	The Three Mesquiteers serial Western
In Early Arizona	Joseph Levering	Wild Bill Elliott, Dorothy Gulliver	United States	B Western
Law of the Plains	Sam Nelson	Charles Starrett, Iris Meredith	United States	B Western
Law of the Texan	Elmer Clifton	Buck Jones, Dorothy Fay	United States	B Western
Lightning Carson Rides Again	Sam Newfield	Tim McCoy, Joan Barclay, Ted Adams	United States	traditional Western
Man from Music Mountain	Joseph Kane	Gene Autry, Smiley Burnette, Sally Payne	United States	Singing cowboy Western
The Mexicali Kid	Wallace Fox	Addison Randall, Wesley Barry, Eleanor Stewart	United States	traditional Western
The Mysterious Rider (aka 'Mark of the Avenger')	Lesley Selander	Douglass Dumbrille, Sidney Toler, Russell Hayden	United States	traditional Western
Of Human Hearts	Clarence Brown	Walter Huston, James Stewart, Beulah Bondi, Gene Reynolds, Guy Kibbee, Charles Coburn, John Carradine	United States	traditional Western
Outlaws of Sonora	George Sherman	Robert Livingston, Ray "Crash" Corrigan, Max Terhune	United States	The Three Mesquiteers serial Western
The Overland Express	Drew Eberson	Buck Jones, Marjorie Reynolds	United States	B Western
Overland Stage Raiders	George Sherman	John Wayne, Ray "Crash" Corrigan, Max Terhune, Louise Brooks	United States	The Three Mesquiteers serial Western
Pals of the Saddle	George Sherman	John Wayne, Ray "Crash" Corrigan, Max Terhune	United States	The Three Mesquiteers serial Western
Phantom Gold	Joseph Levering	Jack Luden, Beth Marion	United States	B Western
Pioneer Trail	Joseph Levering	Jack Luden, Joan Barclay	United States	B Western
The Purple Vigilantes	George Sherman	Robert Livingston, Ray "Crash" Corrigan, Max Terhune	United States	The Three Mesquiteers serial Western
Rawhide	Ray Taylor	Smith Ballew, Lou Gehrig, Evalyn Knapp	United States	traditional Western
Red River Range	George Sherman	John Wayne, Max Terhune, Jane Mason	United States	The Three Mesquiteers serial Western
Ride a Crooked Mile	Alfred E. Green	Akim Tamiroff, Leif Erickson, Frances Farmer, Lynne Overman, John Miljan, J. M. Kerrigan	United States	traditional Western
Riders of the Black Hills	George Sherman	Robert Livingston, Ray "Crash" Corrigan, Max Terhune	United States	The Three Mesquiteers serial Western
Rio Grande	Sam Nelson	Charles Starrett, Ann Doran	United States	B Western
Rolling Caravans	Joseph Levering	Jack Luden, Eleanor Stewart, Harry Woods	United States	B Western
Rollin' Plains	Albert Herman	Tex Ritter, White Flash, Horace Murphy, The Beverly Hillbillies	United States	Singing cowboy Western
Rhythm of the Saddle	George Sherman	Gene Autry, Smiley Burnette, Pert Kelton	United States	Singing cowboy Western
Santa Fe Stampede	George Sherman	John Wayne, Ray "Crash" Corrigan, Max Terhune	United States	The Three Mesquiteers serial Western
Sergeant Berry	Herbert Selpin	Hans Albers, Herbert Selpin, Alexander Golling	Nazi Germany	German Western comedy
The Singing Outlaw	Joseph H. Lewis	Bob Baker, Joan Barclay, Fuzzy Knight	United States	Singing cowboy
Six-Gun Trail	Sam Newfield	Tim McCoy, Nora Lane, Ben Corbett	United States	traditional Western
South of Arizona	Sam Nelson	Charles Starrett, Iris Meredith	United States	B Western
Stagecoach Days	Joseph Levering	Jack Luden, Eleanor Stewart	United States	B Western
The Stranger from Arizona	Elmer Clifton	Buck Jones, Dorothy Fay	United States	B Western
The Terror of Tiny Town	Sam Newfield	Billy Curtis, Yvonne Moray, "Little Billy" Rhodes	United States	B Western
The Texans	James P. Hogan	Joan Bennett, Randolph Scott, May Robson, Walter Brennan	United States	traditional Western
The Utah Trail	Albert Herman	Tex Ritter, Horace Murphy	United States	Singing cowboy Western
Valley of Giants	William Keighley	Wayne Morris, Claire Trevor, Charles Bickford, Alan Hale	United States	luberjack Western
West of Cheyenne	Sam Nelson	Charles Starrett, Iris Meredith	United States	B Western
West of the Santa Fe	Sam Nelson	Charles Starrett, Iris Meredith	United States	B Western
1939
Across the Plains	Spencer Gordon Bennet	Addison Randall, Frank Yaconelli, Joyce Bryant	United States	B Western
Allegheny Uprising	William A. Seiter	Claire Trevor, John Wayne	United States	Colonial American frontier
Arizona Legion	David Howard, Melville Shyer	George O'Brien, Laraine Day	United States	B Western
The Arizona Kid	Joseph Kane	Roy Rogers, Sally Marsh	United States	traditional Western
Blue Montana Skies	B. Reeves Eason	Gene Autry, Smiley Burnette, June Storey	United States	Northern Western
The Cisco Kid and the Lady	Herbert I. Leeds	Cesar Romero, Marjorie Weaver, Chris-Pin Martin	United States	The Cisco Kid serial Western
Code of the Cactus	Sam Newfield	Tim McCoy, Ben Corbett, Dorothy Short	United States	B Western
Cowboys from Texas	George Sherman	Robert Livingston, Duncan Renaldo, Raymond Hatton	United States	The Three Mesquiteers serial Western
Death Goes North	Frank McDonald	Rin Tin Tin Jr., Edgar Edwards	Canada, United States	B Western
Death Rides the Range	Sam Newfield	Ken Maynard, Fay McKenzie	United States	B Western
Destry Rides Again	George Marshall	Marlene Dietrich, James Stewart, Mischa Auer, Charles Winniger, Brian Donlevy	United States	traditional Western
Dodge City	Michael Curtiz	Errol Flynn, Olivia de Havilland, Ann Sheridan, Bruce Cabot	United States	traditional Western
Drums Along the Mohawk	John Ford	Claudette Colbert, Henry Fonda, Edna May Oliver, Eddie Collins, John Carradine	United States	traditional Western
Frontier Marshal	Allan Dwan	Randolph Scott, Nancy Kelly, Cesar Romero, John Carradine	United States	traditional Western
Frontiers of '49	Joseph Levering	Wild Bill Elliott, Luana Alcañiz	United States	B Western
The Frozen Limits	Marcel Varnel	Jimmy Nervo, Bud Flanagan, Teddy Knox	United Kingdom	comedy Northern Western
Geronimo	Paul Sloane	Preston Foster, Ellen Drew, Andy Devine, Gene Lockhart	United States	traditional Western
Jesse James	Henry King	Tyrone Power, Henry Fonda, Nancy Kelly, Randolph Scott, Henry Hull, Brian Donlevy, John Carradine, Donald Meek	United States	traditional Western
The Kansas Terrors	George Sherman	Robert Livingston, Duncan Renaldo, Raymond Hatton	United States	The Three Mesquiteers serial Western
Konga, the Wild Stallion	Sam Nelson	Fred Stone, Rochelle Hudson, Richard Fiske	United States	B Western
The Law Comes to Texas	Joseph Levering	Wild Bill Elliott, Veda Ann Borg	United States	B Western
The Llano Kid	Edward Venturini	Tito Guízar, Gale Sondergaard, Alan Mowbray, Jan Clayton	United States	outlaw Western
Lone Star Pioneers	Joseph Levering	Wild Bill Elliott, Dorothy Gulliver	United States	B Western
The Man from Sundown	Sam Nelson	Charles Starrett, Iris Meredith	United States	B Western
Man of Conquest	George Nicholls Jr.	Richard Dix, Gail Patrick	United States	traditional Western
New Frontier	George Sherman	John Wayne, Ray "Crash" Corrigan, Raymond Hatton	United States	The Three Mesquiteers serial Western
The Night Riders	George Sherman	John Wayne, Ray "Crash" Corrigan, Max Terhune, Doreen McKay	United States	The Three Mesquiteers serial Western
North of the Yukon	Sam Nelson	Charles Starrett, Dorothy Comingore, Bob Nolan	United States	B Western
The Oklahoma Kid	Lloyd Bacon	James Cagney, Humphrey Bogart	United States	traditional Western
Outpost of the Mounties	Charles C. Coleman	Charles Starrett, Iris Meredith, Stanley Brown	United States	B Western
Overland with Kit Carson	Norman Deming, Sam Nelson	Wild Bill Elliott, Iris Meredith, Richard Fiske, Bobby Clack	United States	serial Western
The Return of the Cisco Kid	Herbert I. Leeds	Warner Baxter, Lynn Bari, Cesar Romero, Henry Hull	United States	The Cisco Kid serial Western
Riders of Black River	Norman Deming	Charles Starrett, Iris Meredith	United States	B Western
Rough Riders' Round-up	Joseph Kane	Roy Rogers, Lynne Roberts, Raymond Hatton	United States	Singing cowboy Western
Six-Gun Rhythm	Sam Newfield	Tex Fletcher, Joan Barclay, Ralph Peters, Reed Howes	United States	Singing cowboy Western
Spoilers of the Range	Charles C. Coleman	Charles Starrett, Iris Meredith	United States	B Western
Stand Up and Fight	W. S. Van Dyke	Wallace Beery, Robert Taylor	United States	traditional Western
Stagecoach	John Ford	Claire Trevor, John Wayne, Andy Devine, John Carradine, Thomas Mitchell, Louise Platt, George Bancroft, Donald Meek, Berton Churchill	United States	traditional Western
The Stranger from Texas	Sam Nelson	Charles Starrett, Lorna Gray	United States	B Western
Susannah of the Mounties	William A. Seiter	Shirley Temple, Randolph Scott, Margaret Lockwood	United States	traditional Western
The Taming of the West	Norman Deming	Wild Bill Elliott, Iris Meredith	United States	B Western
Texas Stampede	Sam Nelson	Charles Starrett, Iris Meredith	United States	B Western
Three Texas Steers	George Sherman	John Wayne, Ray "Crash" Corrigan, Max Terhune	United States	The Three Mesquiteers serial Western
The Thundering West	Sam Nelson	Charles Starrett, Iris Meredith	United States	B Western
Two-Fisted Rangers	Joseph H. Lewis	Charles Starrett, Iris Meredith	United States	B Western
Union Pacific	Cecil B. DeMille	Barbara Stanwyck, Joel McCrea, Akim Tamiroff, Robert Preston, Lynne Overman, Brian Donlevy, Anthony Quinn	United States	traditional Western
Water for Canitoga	Herbert Selpin	Hans Albers, Charlotte Susa, Josef Sieber	Nazi Germany	Northern Western
Western Caravans	Sam Nelson	Charles Starrett, Iris Meredith	United States	B Western
Wyoming Outlaw	George Sherman	John Wayne, Ray "Crash" Corrigan, Raymond Hatton	United States	The Three Mesquiteers serial Western
Young Mr. Lincoln	John Ford	Henry Fonda, Alice Brady, Marjorie Weaver, Arleen Whelan	United States	traditional Western
Zorro's Fighting Legion	William Witney, John English	Reed Hadley, Sheila Darcy, Edmund Cobb, Carleton Young	United States	serial Western
