= A Face in the Fog =

1936 film by Robert F. Hill

- DVD cover
- Directed by: Robert F. Hill
- Written by: Peter B. Kyne (novel The Great Mono Miracle); Al Martin (screenplay)
- Starring: See below
- Cinematography: William Hyer
- Edited by: Earl Turner
- Distributed by: Victory Pictures
- Release date: 1 February 1936
- Running time: 66 minutes
- Country: United States
- Language: English

A Face in the Fog is a 1936 American mystery film directed by Robert F. Hill.

== Plot ==
A meddlesome reporter claims she can recognize "the fiend" because she saw his face in the fog (in a mirror). She becomes his target. A fellow reporter tries to protect her, along with a ditzy photographer. After there is a murder in a theater, the playwright pitches in to help solve the case.

== Cast ==
- June Collyer as Jean Monroe
- Lloyd Hughes as Frank Gordon
- Lawrence Gray as Peter Fortune
- Jack Mulhall as Reardon
- Al St. John as Elmer
- John Cowell as Wilson
- John Elliott as Detective Davis
- Sam Flint as Harrison - Newspaper Editor
- Forrest Taylor as Bruce Cromwell
- George Ball Trio as Acrobatic Trio
- Ramsdall Dancers as Dance Troupe
- Donna Lee Trio as Singers
