= Kelly of the Secret Service =

1936 film directed by Robert F. Hill

- Directed by: Robert F. Hill
- Written by: Al Martin; Peter B. Kyne
- Produced by: Sam Katzman
- Starring: Lloyd Hughes; Jack Mulhall; Sheila Bromley
- Cinematography: William Hyer
- Edited by: Dan Milner
- Production company: Victory Pictures
- Distributed by: Victory Pictures
- Release date: July 22, 1936
- Running time: 69 minutes
- Country: United States
- Language: English

Kelly of the Secret Service is a 1936 American mystery film produced by Sam Katzman. Directed by Robert F. Hill, it stars Lloyd Hughes, Jack Mulhall and Sheila Bromley.

== Cast ==
- Lloyd Hughes as Agent Ted Kelly
- Sheila Bromley as Sally Flint
- Forrest Taylor as Dr. G. Marston
- Jack Mulhall as George Lesserman
- John Elliott as Howard Walsh
- Fuzzy Knight as Lefty Hogan
- Syd Saylor as Red
- Miki Morita as Ylon
- John Cowell as Commander Wilson

== Bibliography ==
- Goble, Alan. The Complete Index to Literary Sources in Film. Walter de Gruyter, 1999.
