= Men of the Plains =

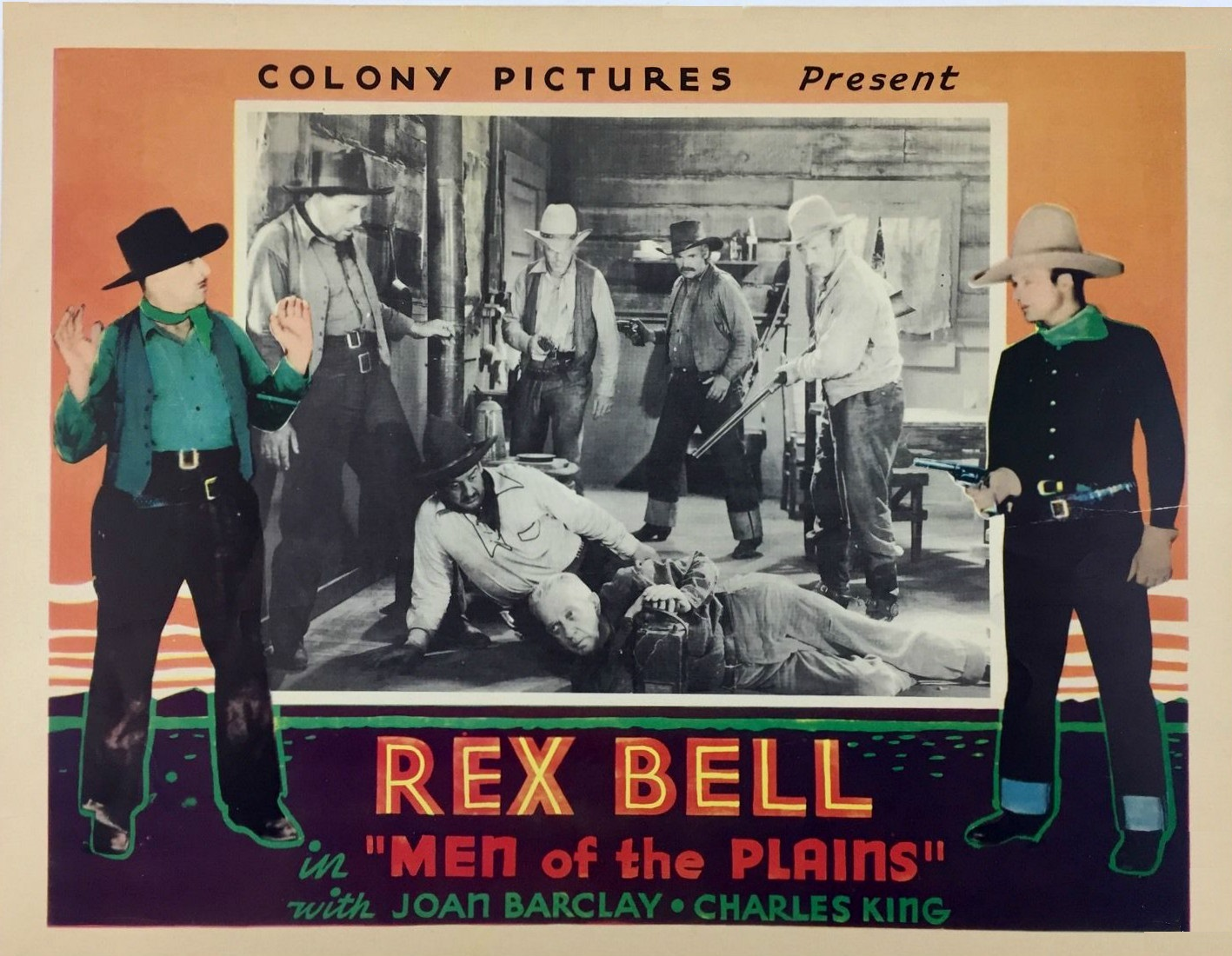
- Lobby card
- Directed by: Robert F. Hill
- Screenplay by: Robert Emmett Tansey
- Produced by: Arthur Alexander; Max Alexander
- Starring: Rex Bell; Joan Barclay; George Ball; Charles King; Forrest Taylor; Roger Williams
- Cinematography: Robert E. Cline
- Edited by: Charles Henkel Jr.
- Production company: Colony Pictures
- Distributed by: Colony Pictures
- Release date: September 29, 1936
- Running time: 62 minutes
- Country: United States
- Language: English

Men of the Plains is a 1936 American Western film directed by Robert F. Hill and written by Robert Emmett Tansey. The film stars Rex Bell, Joan Barclay, George Ball, Charles King, Forrest Taylor and Roger Williams. The film was released on September 29, 1936, by Colony Pictures.

== Cast ==
- Rex Bell as Jim Dean / Tom Porter
- Joan Barclay as Laura Long
- George Ball as Billy Sawyer
- Charles King as Johnson
- Forrest Taylor as James Travis
- Roger Williams as Cole
- Ed Cassidy as J.J. Gray
- John Elliott as Dad Baxter
- Lafe McKee as Marshal Ed Green
- John Cowell as Lucky Gordon
