= Shadow of Chinatown =

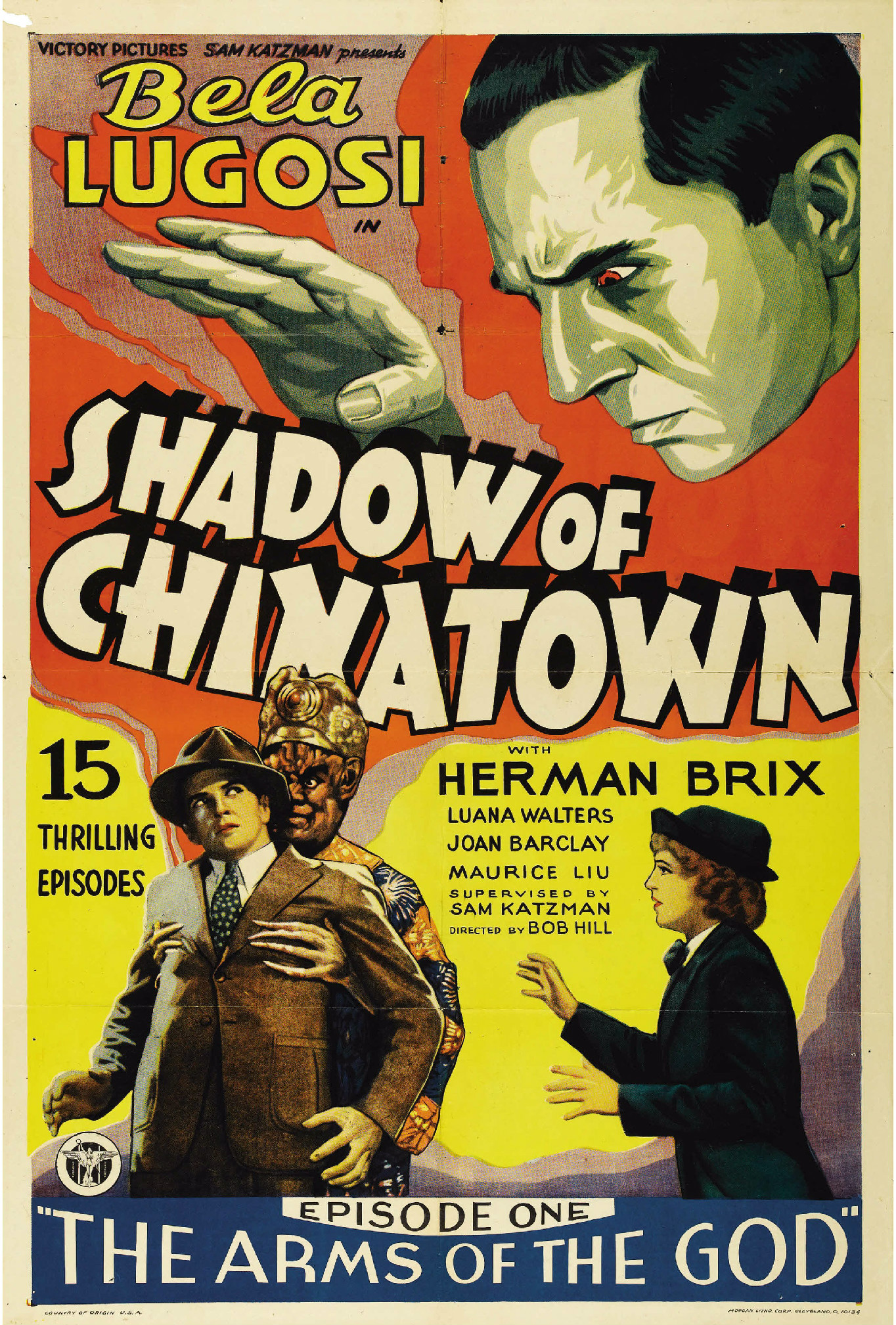
- Film poster advertising the first episode
- Directed by: Robert F. Hill
- Written by: William Buchanan (screenplay); Basil Dickey (screenplay); Robert F. Hill as Rock Hawkey (story)
- Produced by: Sam Katzman
- Starring: See below
- Cinematography: William Hyer
- Edited by: Charles Henkel Jr.
- Distributed by: Victory Pictures
- Release date: 1936
- Running time: 71 minutes (film); 281 minutes (serial)
- Country: United States
- Language: English

Shadow of Chinatown is both a 1936 film serial and a feature film edited from the serial made by Sam Katzman's Victory Pictures.

== Plot ==
A consortium of American businesses are disturbed by the loss of profits due to Chinese businesses located in Chinatowns in the United States. They hire a pair of Eurasians and their criminal organization to eliminate their competition.

== Cast ==
- Bela Lugosi ... Victor Poten
- Herman Brix ... Martin Andrews
- Joan Barclay ... Joan Whiting
- Luana Walters ... Sonya Rokoff, a.k.a. the Dragon Lady
- Charles King ... Grogan
- Forrest Taylor ... Police Captain Walters

== Chapter Titles ==
The serial chapters are as follows:

1. The Arms of the Gods
2. The Crushing Walls
3. 13 Ferguson Alley
4. Death on the Wire
5. The Sinister Ray
6. The Sword Thrower
7. The Noose
8. Midnight
9. The Last Warning
10. The Bomb
11. Thundering Doom
12. Invisible Gas
13. The Brink of Disaster
14. The Fatal Trap
15. The Avenging Powers

== Production ==
The serial was known originally as just Chinatown and was written with Lugosi in mind.

== Release ==
A feature version of this serial was released simultaneously with the serial itself. It was also called "Shadow of Chinatown" with a slightly altered ending.
