= The Phantom of the Range =

1936 film by Robert F. Hill

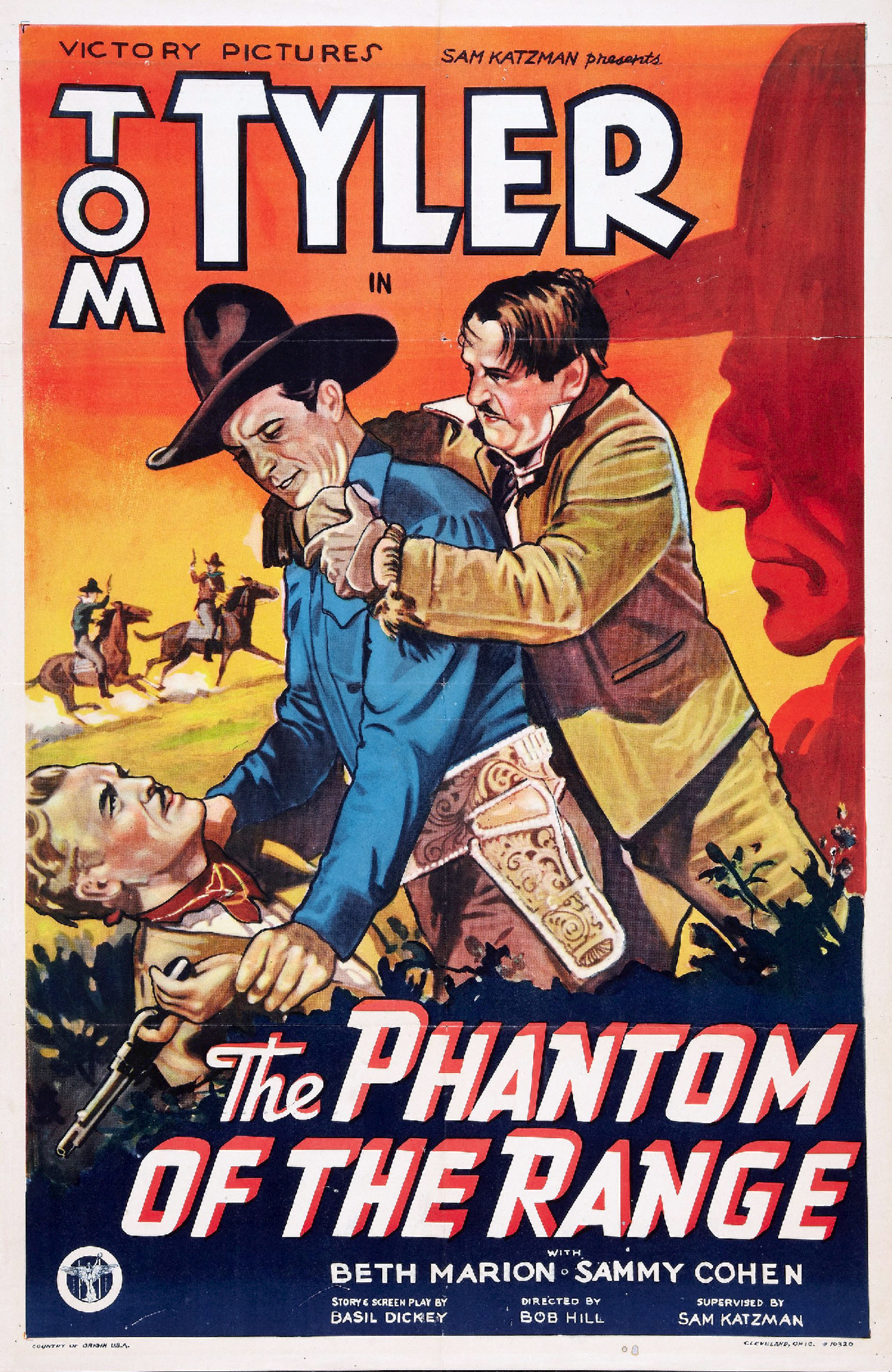
- Directed by: Robert F. Hill
- Written by: Basil Dickey
- Produced by: Sam Katzman
- Starring: See below
- Cinematography: William Hyer
- Edited by: Charles Henkel Jr.
- Distributed by: Victory Pictures
- Release date: November 28, 1936
- Running time: 57 minutes
- Country: United States
- Language: English

The Phantom of the Range is a 1936 American Western film directed by Robert F. Hill.

== Cast ==
- Tom Tyler as Jerry Lane
- Beth Marion as Jeanne Moore
- Sammy Cohen as Eddie Parsons
- Soledad Jiménez as Perdita, the Housekeeper
- Forrest Taylor as Brandon
- Charles King as Henchman Mark Braden
- John Elliott as Rancher
- Richard Cramer as Sheriff
