= Everyman's Law =

1936 film

- Directed by: Albert Ray
- Written by: Earle Snell
- Produced by: A.W. Hackel
- Starring: Johnny Mack Brown; Beth Marion; Frank Campeau
- Cinematography: Jack Greenhalgh
- Edited by: Leete Renick Brown
- Music by: Lee Zahler
- Production company: Supreme Pictures
- Distributed by: William Steiner Distribution
- Release date: June 10, 1936
- Running time: 62 minutes
- Country: United States
- Language: English

Everyman's Law is a 1936 American western film directed by Albert Ray and starring Johnny Mack Brown, Beth Marion and Frank Campeau. It was made as a second feature by the Poverty Row studio Supreme Pictures.

== Cast ==
- Johnny Mack Brown as Johnny - aka The Dog Town Kid
- Beth Marion as Marian Henley
- Frank Campeau as Thinker Gibbs
- Roger Gray as Lobo Joe
- John Beck as Ramrod Pike
- Lloyd Ingraham as Jim Morgan
- Horace Murphy as Sheriff Chris Bradley
- Richard Alexander as Barber
- Slim Whitaker as Pete

== Bibliography ==
- Fetrow, Alan G. . Sound films, 1927-1939: a United States Filmography. McFarland, 1992.
- Pitts, Michael R. Western Movies: A Guide to 5,105 Feature Films. McFarland, 2012.
