= John Elliott (actor) =

American actor (1876–1956)

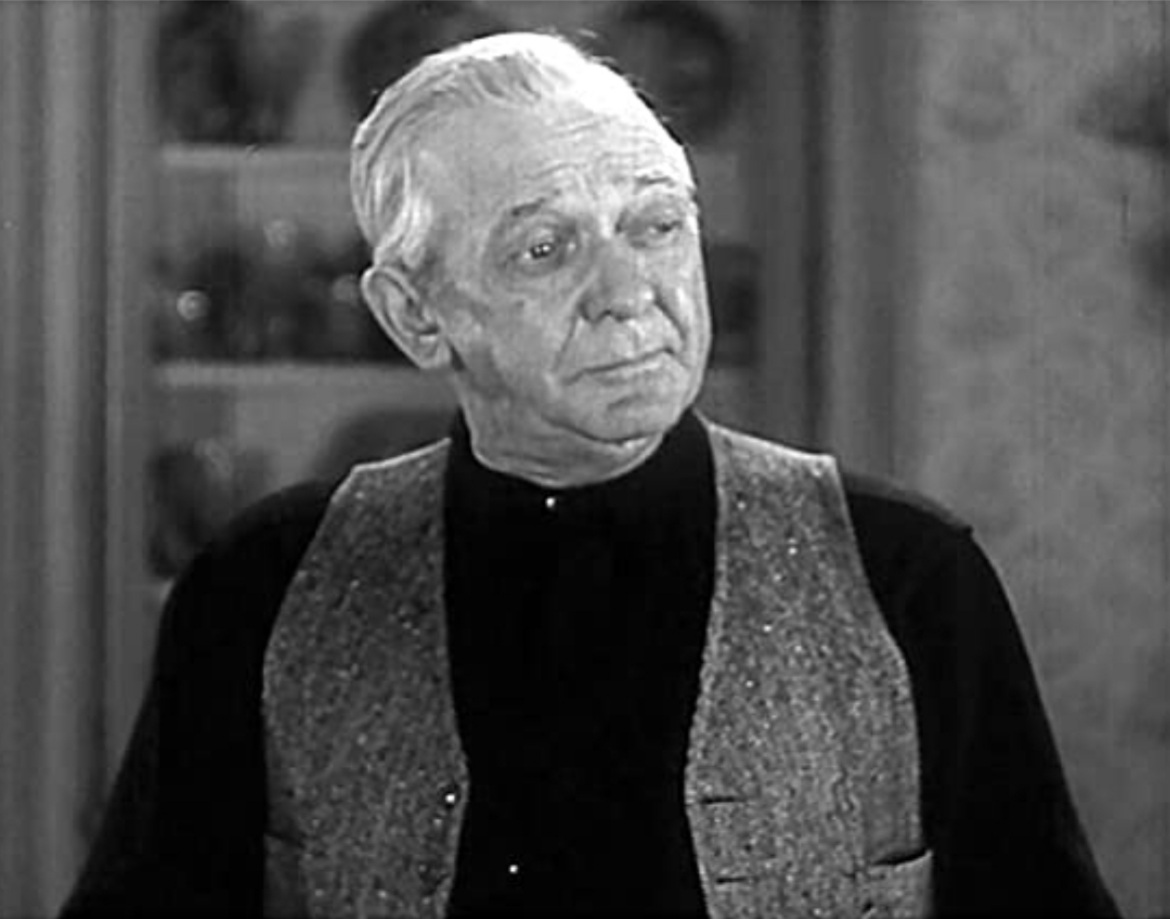
- Elliott in Sunset Range (1935)
- Born: John Hugh Elliott; July 5, 1876; Keosauqua, Iowa, U.S.
- Died: December 12, 1956 (aged 80); Los Angeles, California, U.S.
- Occupation: Actor
- Years active: 1917–1956
- Spouse(s): Cleo Kelly (m. 1897; div. 19??); Jane Faulkner (m. 19??; div. 19??); Edythe Elliott (m. 19??)
- Children: 2

John Hugh Elliott (July 5, 1876 – December 12, 1956) was an American actor who appeared on Broadway and in over 300 films during his career. He worked sporadically during the silent film era, but with the advent of sound his career took off, where he worked constantly for 25 years, finding a particular niche in "B" westerns.

His versatility allowed him to play both "good guys" and "bad guys" with equal aplomb, working right up until his death in 1956.

== Early life ==
Elliott was born in July 1876 in Keosauqua, Iowa to Sarah E. Norris and Jehue S. Elliott. He was the third of four children, and the only boy; his two older sisters were named Elizabeth and Fanny, with his younger sister named Nina. In February 1897, when Elliott was 20, his mother, his sister Fanny came down with typhoid fever. Elliott would be the only one of the three to survive. Two months later, on April 14, Elliot married Cleo Kelly, despite her parents' objections to her marrying an actor.

== Career ==
Elliot began his acting career on stage, where he reached Broadway in 1917, appearing as Robert Goring in the very successful play, Eyes of Youth. The play was produced by A. H. Woods, Lee Shubert, and Jacob J. Shubert, and ran for over a year at the Maxine Elliott Theatre. Elliott's screen debut came in the featured role of Sir Robert Eastbourne in the 1919 silent film When a Man Loves. Less than two dozen of his film appearances were during the silent era. Beginning with the advent of sound, Elliott would begin to make the bulk of his 300 film appearances.

In 1930, he had the featured role of General Robert E. Lee in Only the Brave (1930), starring Gary Cooper. It was a role he would play in several films, such as Carolina (1934), starring Janet Gaynor and Lionel Barrymore; and Operator 13 (1934), again starring Cooper. His roles would run the gamut, from small nameless roles, as a banker in the 1939 film, The Story of Alexander Graham Bell, starring Don Ameche and Loretta Young; to smaller named roles such as Captain Wilkins in The Conquering Horde (1931), starring Richard Arlen and Fay Wray; to featured roles like that of Jess Roarke in 1936's Ridin' On.

Other notable films in which Elliot appeared include: the role of the lodge officer in the opening scenes of Laurel and Hardy's Sons of the Desert (1933), a small role as a padre in Michael Curtiz' 1934 military drama, The Key, starring William Powell; a bit part as one of the directors in the 1935 comedy, A Night at the Ritz, starring William Gargan; as Judge Matthews in 1939's Jesse James, starring Tyrone Power and Henry Fonda; the role of Tremont in Hold That Co-ed, a 1938 comedy starring John Barrymore, George Murphy and Marjorie Weaver; a small role as a purchaser in the 1938 drama Kentucky, starring Loretta Young and Richard Greene; a small role in Orson Welles' 1942 historical drama, The Magnificent Ambersons, starring Joseph Cotten, Dolores Costello, Anne Baxter, and Tim Holt; an admiral in 1944's Marine Raiders, starring Pat O'Brien, Robert Ryan, and Ruth Hussey; the role of Hooker in Randolph Scott's 1946 western, Badman's Territory; as the judge in the 1947 film noir The Unfaithful, starring Ann Sheridan, Lew Ayres and Zachary Scott; as a train conductor in the 1947 biopic The Babe Ruth Story, starring William Bendix and Claire Trevor; as a workman in Jean Renoir's 1947 drama, The Woman on the Beach, starring Robert Ryan, Joan Bennett, and Charles Bickford; as a clerk in Orson Welles' film noir, The Lady from Shanghai, starring Rita Hayworth and Welles; and as a judge in the 1949 crime drama, Flaxy Martin, starring Virginia Mayo. His final appearance in a feature film was as the minister in George Cukor's 1952 comedy-drama, The Marrying Kind, starring Aldo Ray and Judy Holliday. His final acting appearance was in the 1956 western serial, Perils of the Wilderness, in the role of Homer Lynch.

== Death ==
Elliott died on December 12, 1956, in Los Angeles, less than a year after the release of his final performance.

== Filmography ==
(Per AFI database)

- When a Man Loves (1919) as Sir Robert Eastbourne
- Homer Comes Home (1920) as Mr. Bailly (as John H. Elliot)
- Are All Men Alike? (1920) as Uncle Chandler
- Held In Trust (1920) as Jasper Haig (as John H. Elliott)
- A Master Stroke (1920) as George Trevor (as John Elliot)
- Her Winning Way (1921) as Mallon
- The Eagle's Feather (1923) as Parson Winger
- The Spoilers (1923) as Bill Wheaton
- Flaming Waters (1925) as Professor Richard Crawford
- Christine of the Big Tops (1926) as Dr. Hastings
- Racing Blood (1926) as Johnn Sterling
- What Happened to Jones (1926) as The Bishop
- Horse Shoes (1927) as William Baker
- Million Dollar Mystery (1927) as Stanley Hargreaves / Inspector Jedson
- The Phantom in the House (1929) as Police Captain
- For the Defense (1930) as Joseph McGann (uncredited)
- Only the Brave (1930) as Gen. Robert E. Lee
- The Rampant Age (1930) as Arnold Benton
- The Widow From Chicago (1930) as Detective T. Finnegan (uncredited)
- Oklahoma Jim (1931) as Indian Agent
- The Conquering Horde (1931) as Capt. Wilkins
- Galloping Thru (1931) as Mr. Winton
- Secret Menace (1931) as John Grant
- Dugan of the Bad Lands (1931) as Sheriff Manning
- Mother and Son (1931) as Mr. Winfield (as John Elliot)
- God's Country and the Man (1931) as Young
- The Montana Kid (1931) as Burke
- Two Fisted Justice (1931) as Mr. Cameron - Nancy's Father
- Call Her Savage (1932) as Hank (uncredited)
- Hidden Valley (1932) as Judge
- The Night of June 13 (1932) as Real Estate Agent (uncredited)
- Riders of the Desert (1932) as Dad Houston
- Texas Pioneers (1932) as Colonel Thomas
- Vanishing Men (1932) as Heck Claiborne
- South of Santa Fe (1932) as Thornton
- From Broadway to Cheyenne (1932) as Martin Kildare
- Single-Handed Sanders (1932) as Senator Graham
- Week Ends Only (1932) as Bartender
- Lucky Larrigan (1932) as J. C. Bailey (as John Elliot)
- Breed of the Border (1933) as Judge Stafford
- The Gallant Fool (1933) as Chris McDonald
- Sons of the Desert (1933) as Exalted Exhausted Ruler (uncredited)
- As the Earth Turns (1934) as Country Doctor (uncredited) (as John H. Elliott)
- Operator 13 (1934) as Gen. Robert E. Lee (uncredited)
- Ticket to a Crime (1934) as Mr. Davidson
- Upper World (1934) as Crandall (scenes deleted)
- I Can't Escape (1934) as Mr. Douglas (uncredited)
- I Sell Anything (1934) as Lawyer (uncredited)
- The Murder in the Museum (1934) as Detective Chief Snell
- Green Eyes (1934) as Chemist (uncredited)
- One in a Million (1934)
- The Key (1934) as Gen. Robert E. Lee (uncredited)
- Desirable (1934)
- Gentlemen Are Born (1934) as Bill - Night Editor (uncredited) (as John H. Elliott)
- Side Streets (1934) as The Judge (uncredited)
- A Lost Lady (1934) as Bridge Player (uncredited)
- Carolina (1934) as Gen. Robert E. Lee (as John Elliot)
- Kid Courageous (1934) as High-Hat Clickett
- The Quitter (1934) as Advertiser
- Cowboy Holiday (1934) as Sheriff Hank Simpson
- Fighting Pioneers (1935) as Major Dent (as John Elliot)
- Captured in Chinatown (1935) as Butler—City Editor
- A Night at the Ritz (1935) as Director (uncredited) (as John H. Elliott)
- The Girl Who Came Back (1935) as Police Captain (uncredited)
- Rainbow's End (1935) as Adam Ware
- Bulldog Courage (1935) as Judge Charley Miller
- Big Calibre (1935) as Rusty Hicks
- Danger Trails (1935) as George Wilson - aka Pecos
- Make a Million (1935) as Dean
- Saddle Aces (1935) as The Judge (as John Elliot)
- Sunset Range (1935) as Dan Caswell
- Toll of the Desert (1935) as Judge
- Wagon Trail (1935) as Judge
- Frontier Justice (1935) as Ben Livesay
- Tombstone Terror (1935) as Mr. Dixon
- Trigger Tom (1935) as Nord Jergenson
- Trails of the Wild (1935) as Tom Madison
- Unconquered Bandit (1935) as Mr. Morgan, Tom's Father
- Red Hot Tires (1935)
- Skull and Crown (1935) as John Norton
- What Price Crime (1935) as Chief Radcliff (as John Elliot)
- Bars of Hate (1935) as The Sheriff
- The Rider of the Law (1935) as Town Mayor
- The Drunkard (1935) as Third Drunk
- Lawless Border (1935) as Border Patrol chief (as John Elliot)
- Vagabond Lady (1935) as Poolside Master of Ceremonies (uncredited) (as John H. Elliott)
- Midnight Phantom (1935) as Capt. Bill Withers
- Danger Ahead (1935) as Capt. Matthews
- Frontier Justice (1935) as Ben Livesay
- Kelly of the Secret Service (1936) as Howard Walsh
- The Rogues' Tavern (1936) as Mr. Jamison
- Avenging Waters (1936) as Charles Mortimer
- Millionaire Kid (1936) as Yellerton (as John Elliot)
- Rip Roarin' Buckaroo (1936) as Colonel Hayden
- Times Square Playboy (1936) as Sam - chairman of the Board of Directors (uncredited)
- Ambush Valley (1936) as Bob Morgan (uncredited)
- The Crime of Dr. Forbes (1936) as Faculty Doctor (uncredited)
- Prison Shadows (1936) as The Police Captain
- Hearts Divided (1936) as James Monroe (uncredited)
- Vengeance of Rannah (1936) as Doc Adams (as John Elliot)
- A Face in the Fog (1936) as Detective Davis
- Ridin' On (1936) as Jess Roarke
- Snowed Under (1936) as First Actor (scenes deleted)
- Roarin' Guns (1936) as Bob Morgan
- Roamin' Wild (1936) as Chief Inspector Reed
- Trail Dust (1936) as John Clark
- Phantom of the Range (1936) as Hiram Moore
- Men of the Plains (1936) as Dad Baxter (as John Elliot)
- The Fugitive Sheriff (1936) as Judge Roberts
- Legion of Terror (1936) as Postmaster (uncredited)
- Rio Grande Ranger (1936) as John Cullen (as John Elliot)
- Dodge City Trail (1936)
- Death in the Air (1936) as Dr. Norris
- Souls at Sea (1937)
- Smoke Tree Range (1937) as Jim Cary
- Submarine D-1 (1937) as Father on Pier (uncredited)
- The Shadow Strikes (1937) as Chester Randall (uncredited) (as John Elliot)
- Children of Loneliness (1937)
- Love Is on the Air (1937) as Mr. Grant McKenzie (uncredited) (as John H. Elliott)
- Flying Fists (1937) as Jim Conrad
- Headin' East (1937) as M.H. Benson
- Hold That Co-ed (1938) as Legislator (uncredited)
- Kentucky (1938) as Cal (uncredited)
- Cassidy of Bar 20 (1938) as Tom Dillon
- Heart of Arizona (1938) as Buck Peters
- Keep Smiling (1938) as Spence (uncredited) (as John H. Elliott)
- Trigger Fingers (1939) as Jim Bolton
- The Story of Alexander Graham Bell (1939) as Banker at Demo (uncredited)
- Jesse James (1939) as Judge Mathews
- Port of Hate (1939) as Stevens
- The Invisible Killer (1939) as Gambler
- Mystery Plane (1939) as Army Colonel
- Mesquite Buckaroo (1939) as Tavern Owner Hawk
- The Fighting Renegade (1939) as Prospector (as John Elliot)
- Death Rides the Range (1939) as Hiram Crabtree
- The Great Profile (1940) as Pop - Stage Doorman (uncredited)
- Lightning Strikes West (1940) as Dr. Jenkins
- Covered Wagon Trails (1940) as Beaumont - Rancher
- Gun Code (1940) as Parson A. Hammond
- Phantom Rancher (1940) as Dad Markham
- Lone Star Raiders (1940) as Dad Cameron
- The Tulsa Kid (1940) as Judge Perkins
- The Man Who Wouldn't Talk (1940) as Juror (uncredited) (as John H. Elliot)
- The Apache Kid (1941) as Judge John Taylor
- Golden Hoofs (1941) as Race Announcer (uncredited)
- The Kid's Last Ride (1941) as Disher
- Marry the Boss's Daughter (1941) as Cynical Passerby (uncredited)
- Private Nurse (1941) as Clerk (uncredited)
- Ride, Kelly, Ride (1941) as Doctor (uncredited)
- The Texas Marshal (1941) as John Gorham
- Gentleman from Dixie (1941) as Prosecutor
- The Lone Rider in Frontier Fury (1941) as Jim Bowen
- Tumbledown Ranch in Arizona (1941) as Judge Jones
- Saddle Mountain Roundup (1941) as 'Magpie' Harper
- Billy the Kid's Round-Up (1941) as Red Gap Judge (uncredited)
- Come on Danger (1942) as Saunders
- Border Roundup (1942) as Jeff Sloane
- Land of the Open Range (1942) as George 'Dad' Cook
- The Mad Monster (1942) as Professor Hatfield
- The Magnificent Ambersons (1942) as Guest (uncredited)
- Overland Stagecoach (1942) as Jeff Clark
- Pirates of the Prairie (1942) as John Spencer (as John H. Elliott)
- Rock River Renegades (1942) as Dick Ross
- Rolling Down the Great Divide (1942) as Lem Bartlett
- Red River Robin Hood (1942) as Mr. Brady (uncredited)
- Calling Dr. Death (1943) as Priest
- Corvette K-225 (1943) as Merchant Captain (uncredited)
- Fighting Valley (1943) as Frank Burke
- First Comes Courage (1943) as Norwegian Patient (uncredited) (as John H. Elliott)
- Death Rides the Plains (1943) as James Marshall
- Law of the Saddle (1943) as Dan Kirby
- My Kingdom for a Cook (1943) as Janitor (uncredited)
- Raiders of San Joaquin (1943) as R.R. Vice President Morgan
- Sagebrush Law (1943) as Cole Winters (as John H. Elliott)
- Tenting Tonight on the Old Camp Ground (1943) as Inspector Talbot
- Two Fisted Justice (1943) as Uncle Will Hodgins
- You're a Lucky Fellow, Mr. Smith (1943) as Lawyer (uncredited)
- Cattle Stampede (1943) as Dr. George Arnold
- The Heavenly Body (1944) as Prof. Collier (uncredited)
- Heavenly Days (1944) as An Average Citizen (uncredited)
- Fuzzy Settles Down (1944) as John Martin (Newspaper Editor)
- Experiment Perilous (1944) as Phone Operator (uncredited)
- Dead Man's Eyes (1944) as Travers the Butler (uncredited)
- Marine Raiders (1944) as Admiral (uncredited)
- Mr. Winkle Goes to War (1944) as Walker (uncredited)
- Oklahoma Raiders (1944) as Judge Clem Masters
- Bowery to Broadway (1944) as Reformer (uncredited)
- Home in Indiana (1944) as Man Seated Left of J.T. in Bar (uncredited)
- Marshal of Gunsmoke (1944) as Judge Brown (uncredited)
- Wild Horse Phantom (1944) as Prison Warden
- Night Club Girl (1945)
- Allotment Wives (1945) as Police Doctor
- Eadie Was a Lady (1945) as Butler (uncredited)
- Escape in the Fog (1945) as Thomas - the Butler (uncredited) (as John H. Elliott)
- Hollywood and Vine (1945) as Judge (uncredited)
- One Way to Love (1946) as Butler (uncredited)
- Badman's Territory (1946) as Brother Hooker (uncredited)
- The Dark Corner (1946) as Laundry Proprietor (uncredited)
- Deadline at Dawn (1946) as Sleepy Man (uncredited)
- The Devil's Mask (1946) as John the Butler (uncredited)
- Frontier Gunlaw (1946) as Pop Evans
- Moon Over Montana (1946) as Judge (uncredited)
- Cry Wolf (1947) as Clergyman (voice, uncredited)
- The Fighting Vigilantes (1947) as Bert (as John Elliot)
- Law of the Lash (1947) as Dad Hilton
- Millie's Daughter (1947) as Butler (uncredited)
- News Hounds (1947) as Judge (as John H. Elliott)
- Nora Prentiss (1947)
- Lighthouse (1947) as Justice of the Peace
- The Unfaithful (1947) as Judge Edward R. McVey (uncredited)
- The Woman on the Beach (1947) as Old Workman (uncredited)
- The Lady from Shanghai (1947) as Court Clerk (uncredited)
- Angels' Alley (1948) as Magistrate E.J. Saunders (as John H. Elliott)
- The Babe Ruth Story (1948) as Conductor (scenes deleted) (as John H. Elliott)
- The Countess of Monte Cristo (1948) as Innkeeper (uncredited)
- I Wouldn't Be in Your Shoes (1948) as Mr. Lake - Tom's Lawyer (as John H. Elliott)
- Letter from an Unknown Woman (1948) as Flower Vendor (uncredited) (as John Elliot)
- Smart Woman (1948) as Harker (uncredited) (as John H. Elliott)
- Smoky Mountain Melody (1948) as Englesby
- Flaxy Martin (1949) as Judge Edward R. McVey (uncredited)
- Homicide (1949) as Doctor (uncredited)
- The Arizona Cowboy (1950) as Ace Allen
- The Marrying Kind (1952) as Minister (uncredited)
