= Rip Roarin' Buckaroo =

1936 film

- Directed by: Robert F. Hill
- Written by: William Buchanan (story and screenplay)
- Starring: See below
- Cinematography: William Hyer
- Edited by: Charles Henkel Jr.
- Distributed by: Victory Pictures
- Release date: October 15, 1936
- Running time: 51 minutes 57 minutes (American original release)
- Country: United States
- Language: English

Rip Roarin' Buckaroo is a 1936 American Western film directed by Robert F. Hill.

== Cast ==
- Tom Tyler as "Scotty" McQuade
- Beth Marion as Betty Rose Hayden
- Sammy Cohen as "Frozen-Face" Cohen
- Forrest Taylor as Lew Slater
- Charles King as "Bones" Kennedy
- John Elliott as Colonel Hayden
- Theodore Lorch as Ted Todd - Trainer
- Richard Cramer as Sheriff
- Wimpy the Dog as Alexander
