= Prison Shadows =

1936 film by Robert F. Hill

- Theatrical release poster
- Directed by: Robert F. Hill
- Written by: Al Martin
- Starring: Edward J. Nugent; Lucille Lund; Joan Barclay
- Cinematography: William Hyer
- Edited by: Dan Milner
- Production company: Puritan Pictures
- Distributed by: Puritan Pictures
- Release date: July 18, 1936
- Running time: 65 minutes
- Country: United States
- Language: English

Prison Shadows is a 1936 American crime film directed by Robert F. Hill and starring Edward J. Nugent, Lucille Lund, and Joan Barclay.

== Plot ==
Gene Harris, a prizefighter, is sentenced to five years in prison after killing an opponent in the ring. Gene's trainer Moran is suspicious of promoter George Miller, whose accomplice Claire Thomas is pretending to be in love with Gene while double-crossing him.

Gene is paroled after three years. He returns to boxing, supported by Mary Comstock, a girl from Miller's office who believes in Gene's innocence, even after another foe dies while fighting him. They discover that an undetectable poison is being used on the fighters' towels. Overhearing a plot to kill him the same way, Gene plays dead and is carried out, setting a trap with the police that the villains fall into right after the fight.

== Cast ==
- Edward J. Nugent as Gene Harris
- Lucille Lund as Claire Thomas
- Joan Barclay as Mary Comstock
- Forrest Taylor as George Miller
- Syd Saylor as Dave Moran
- Monte Blue as Bert McNamee
- John Elliott as The Police Captain
- Jack Cowell as Graham, Murphy's manager
- Willard Kent as Veterinarian
- Walter O'Keefe as John Halligan, referee
- Martha Wentworth as Mrs. Murphy
- Lloyd Ingraham as Prison Warden
- Murdock MacQuarrie as Fight Fan
- Arthur Thalasso as Coroner
- Dorothy Vernon as Waitress at Tea Room
- Jack Cheatham as Cop
- Corky as Babe, Gene's Dog

== See also ==
- List of boxing films

== Bibliography ==
- Pitts, Michael R. Poverty Row Studios, 1929-1940. McFarland & Company, 2005.
