= Trail of Terror (1935 film) =

1935 American Western film

- Directed by: Robert N. Bradbury
- Written by: Robert N. Bradbury
- Produced by: A.W. Hackel
- Starring: Bob Steele; Beth Marion; Forrest Taylor
- Cinematography: E.M. MacManigal
- Edited by: S. Roy Luby
- Production company: Supreme Pictures
- Distributed by: Supreme Pictures
- Release date: December 20, 1935
- Running time: 54 minutes
- Country: United States
- Language: English

Trail of Terror is a 1935 American Western film directed by Robert N. Bradbury and starring Bob Steele, Beth Marion and Forrest Taylor. It was made for release for Supreme Pictures and was produced by A. W. Hackel.

== Cast ==
- Bob Steele as Jim Wilson - aka Spike Manning
- Beth Marion as Judy Baxter
- Forrest Taylor as Blake
- Charles King as Hashknife
- Frank Lyman Jr. as Kent Baxter
- Charles K. French as Sheriff Baxter
- Lloyd Ingraham as Warden
- Richard Cramer as Muggs
- Nancy Deshon as June O'Day
