= Danger Trails =

1935 film

- Directed by: Robert F. Hill
- Written by: Robert F. Hill; Guinn 'Big Boy' Williams
- Produced by: Arthur Alexander; Max Alexander; Peter E. Kassler
- Starring: Guinn 'Big Boy' Williams; John Elliott; Hal Taliaferro
- Cinematography: William Hyer
- Edited by: Holbrook N. Todd
- Production company: Beacon Productions
- Distributed by: First Division Pictures
- Release date: August 3, 1935
- Running time: 62 minutes
- Country: United States
- Language: English

Danger Trails is a 1935 American western film directed by Robert F. Hill and starring Guinn 'Big Boy' Williams, John Elliott and Hal Taliaferro. It was made by the independent Beacon Productions.

== Plot ==
A man returns from being educated in the East to discover that his father has been killed. He sets out to avenge it with the help of his three outlaw brothers.

== Cast ==
- Guinn 'Big Boy' Williams as Bob Wilson
- Marjorie Gordon as Ruth Hopkins
- John Elliott as George Wilson - aka Pecos
- Hal Taliaferro as Desolation Wilson
- Edmund Cobb as Hank Wilson
- Ace Cain as Dead Pan Wilson
- Steve Clark as Marshal Hopkins

== Bibliography ==
- Fetrow, Alan G. . Sound films, 1927-1939: a United States Filmography. McFarland, 1992.
- Pitts, Michael R. Western Movies: A Guide to 5,105 Feature Films. McFarland, 2012.
