= The Fugitive Sheriff =

1936 film by Spencer Gordon Bennet

- Directed by: Spencer Gordon Bennet
- Written by: Nate Gatzert
- Produced by: Larry Darmour
- Starring: Ken Maynard; Beth Marion; Walter Miller
- Cinematography: James S. Brown Jr.
- Edited by: Dwight Caldwell
- Production company: Columbia Pictures
- Distributed by: Columbia Pictures
- Release date: October 20, 1936
- Running time: 58 minutes
- Country: United States
- Language: English

The Fugitive Sheriff is a 1936 American Western film directed by Spencer Gordon Bennet and starring Ken Maynard, Beth Marion and Walter Miller.

== Cast ==
- Ken Maynard as Ken Marshall
- Beth Marion as June Roberts
- Walter Miller as Flamer Willis
- Hal Price as Louder Lucas
- John Elliott as Judge Roberts
- Arthur Millett as John
- Virginia True Boardman as Mrs. Roberts
- Frank Ball as Prospector
- Edmund Cobb as Wally

== Bibliography ==
- Pitts, Michael R. Western Movies: A Guide to 5,105 Feature Films. McFarland, 2012.
