= Skull and Crown =

1935 film

- Lobby card
- Directed by: Elmer Clifton
- Written by: James Oliver Curwood (story); Bennett Cohen (screenplay) and Carl Krusada (screenplay)
- Produced by: Bernard B. Ray (producer); Harry S. Webb (associate producer)
- Starring: See below
- Cinematography: Pliny Goodfriend
- Edited by: Frederick Bain
- Production company: Reliable Pictures
- Release date: 1935
- Running time: 56 minutes
- Country: United States
- Language: English

Skull and Crown is a 1935 American Western film directed by Elmer Clifton. It was the final film of Molly O'Day.

== Plot ==
In his cabin, Bob Franklin plans a reunion with his sister, Barbara. His dog, Rinty comes in, with flowers in his mouth and hands them to his owner.

After they both look at a picture of Barbara, Bob lets Dad Miller borrow his car and Rinty hops in. When Dad Miller and Rinty find Barbara, Rinty, himself hands a note to her from her brother, who is on the hunt for the murderous bandit, El Zorro.

When Barbara drives the car to her brother's cabin and she and Rinty go inside, Zorro sneaks in. Rinty tries to stop Zorro, but, it was too late. Zorro shot and killed Barbara.

When Bob finds out about his sister's death, he gets really upset.

Rinty goes on hunt to find Zorro and bring him to justice. Meanwhile, at the Pinecone Lodge, King has a conversation with two men.

Near the end of the plot, Rinty finds Bob, tied to a chair by Zorro. He chews the ropes and sets Bob free. When they find Zorro, who reveals to be King, Rinty, himself fights with the bandit. King, alias El Zorro, gets arrested.

At the end of the plot, Bob and Ann Norton watch inside the cabin, as Rinty stands on a nearby rocky terrain.

== Cast ==
- Rin Tin Tin Jr. as Rinty
- Regis Toomey as Bob Franklin posing as Rocky Morgan
- Jack Mulhall as Border Patrolman Ed
- Molly O'Day as Ann Norton
- Jack Mower as King / El Zorro
- Lois January as Barbara Franklin
- James Murray as Henchman Matt Brent
- John Elliott as John Norton
- Tom London as Henchman Jennings
- Milburn Morante as Dad Miller

== Production ==
The serial was filmed partly on location in Big Bear. The Big Bear footage was shot over the course of a week in October, 1934.
