= Beth Marion =

American actress

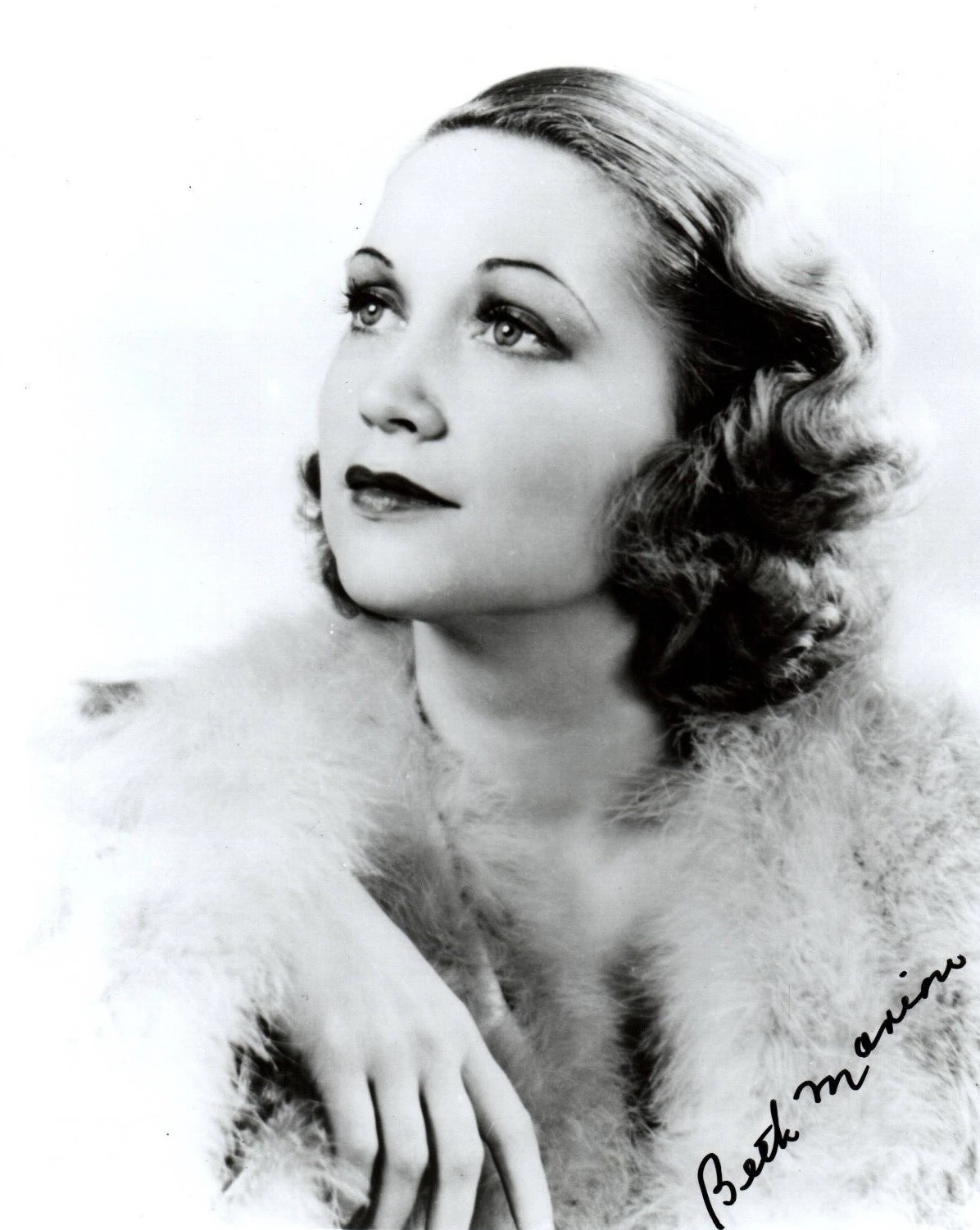
- Autographed photo
- Born: Betty Goettsche; July 12, 1912; Clinton, Iowa, US
- Died: February 18, 2003 (aged 90); Jacksonville, Oregon, US
- Education: Northwestern University
- Occupation: Film actress
- Years active: 1935–1955
- Spouse(s): Cliff Lyons (1938-1955) (divorced) - 2 children Julian Koch (1956-2003) (her death)

Beth Marion (born Betty Goettsche; July 11, 1912 – February 18, 2003) was an American B-movie actress of the 1930s, starring in westerns, her career spanning only about five years, mostly in 1936.

== Early years ==
Born in Clinton, Iowa, Marion was the daughter of actor George Paul Goettsche (who went by the name George Paul) and Marion Stuart Paul. Her parents had their own stock theater troupe, the George Paul Company, and Marion traveled with them until she was three years old. When her parents divorced, she was raised by her grandparents in Clinton while her mother worked in Chicago and eventually remarried. Marion's elementary and secondary schooling occurred in Clinton. She attended Northwestern University, where she sang in a trio with two other young women.

== Career ==
Marion acted in stock theater before entering films. She began her film career in 1935. her films often saw her playing alongside Buck Jones, Johnny Mack Brown, Bob Steele, Jack Luden, and George Houston. In 1935, she played Gail Winters in Between Men, and Judy Baxter in Trail of Terror. In 1936, Marion played Peggy Wyman in Silver Spurs, Mary Mortimer in Avenging Waters, starred in The Fugitive Sheriff with Ken Maynard, and played the role of Marion Henry in Everyman's Law. She also starred as Betty Rose Hayden in Rip Roarin' Buckaroo, Jeanne Moore in The Phantom of the Range, which also starred Tom Tyler and Sammy Cohen, and billed as Betty Lloyd she starred in Wild Horse Roundup with Kermit Maynard, and that same year she starred in Fugitive Sheriff with Ken Maynard.

In 1938, Marion appeared in Phantom Gold and in Frontier Scout. In 1955, she made an uncredited cameo appearance as a "woman with feather," in Ain't Misbehavin'.

== Personal life ==
In 1938, Marion married stuntman Cliff Lyons, and retired from acting to raise a family. The couple had two sons, but divorced in the 1950s. She later married Julian Koch, a building contractor, with whom she would remain for the rest of her life, moving to and residing in Oregon.

== Death ==
Marion died of a stroke at age 90 on February 18, 2003, in Jacksonville, Oregon.
