= Hidden Valley (film) =

1932 film

- Directed by: Robert N. Bradbury
- Written by: Wellyn Totman
- Produced by: Trem Carr; W. Ray Johnston
- Starring: Bob Steele; Gertrude Messinger; Francis McDonald
- Cinematography: Archie Stout
- Edited by: Carl Pierson
- Production company: Trem Carr Pictures
- Distributed by: Monogram Pictures
- Release date: October 10, 1932
- Running time: 57 minutes
- Country: United States
- Language: English

Hidden Valley is a 1932 American Western film directed by Robert N. Bradbury and starring Bob Steele, Gertrude Messinger and Francis McDonald. The first Goodyear Blimp to make an appearance in a feature film, the NC-8A Volunteer plays a role.

== Plot ==
In New Mexico Bob Harding is assisting a professor in search of an ancient civilization, when his companion is shot and killed and the map he is carrying stolen by a gang looking for treasure. Harding is arrested and tried for murder, but manages to escape.

Fighting to prove his innocence, both Bob and the real murderers enter the hidden valley that is the gateway to the civilisation.

== Cast ==
- Bob Steele as Bob Harding
- Gertrude Messinger as Joyce Lanners
- Francis McDonald as Frank Gavin
- Ray Hallor as Jimmie Lanners
- John Elliott as Judge
- Arthur Millett as Sheriff Dave Bristow
- V.L. Barnes as McCord - Prospector
- George 'Gabby' Hayes as Gavin Henchman - Dark Hat
- Joe De La Cruz as Gomez - Gavin Henchman
- Dick Dickinson as Gavin Henchman - White Hat
- Earl Dwire as Prosecuting Attorney
- Jack Evans as Deputy on Desert
- Herman Hack as Indian Medicine Man / Posse Rider
- William McCall as Deputy Bill
- Artie Ortego as an Indian Guide

== Bibliography ==
- Pitts, Michael R. Western Movies: A Guide to 5,105 Feature Films. McFarland, 2012.
