= Call of the West (film) =

1930 western film

- Directed by: Albert Ray
- Written by: Colin Clements; Florence Ryerson
- Produced by: Harry Cohn
- Starring: Dorothy Revier; Matt Moore; Tom O'Brien
- Cinematography: Benjamin H. Kline
- Edited by: Ray Snyder
- Production company: Columbia Pictures
- Distributed by: Columbia Pictures
- Release date: May 10, 1930
- Running time: 65 minutes
- Country: United States
- Language: English

Call of the West is a 1930 American pre-Code Western film directed by Albert Ray and starring Dorothy Revier, Matt Moore and Tom O'Brien.

== Plot ==
Nightclub performer Violet La Tour collapses during a show in Sagebrush, Texas, and is subsequently cared for at the ranch of Lon Dixon. As they spend time together, they develop feelings for each other and eventually get married. However, when Lon leaves to join a posse hunting for rustlers, Violet feels abandoned and decides to return to New York.

Back in the city, Violet is courted by her agent, Maurice Kane, but her heart remains with Lon. When Lon unexpectedly arrives in New York to reclaim her, Violet reaffirms her love for him, solidifying their bond once again.

== Cast ==
- Dorothy Revier as Violet La Tour
- Matt Moore as Lon Dixon
- Kathrin Clare Ward as Ma Dixon
- Tom O'Brien as Bull Clarkson
- Alan Roscoe as Maurice Kane
- Victor Potel as Trig Peters
- Nick De Ruiz as Frijoles
- Joe De La Cruz as Mexicali
- Blanche Rose as Mrs. Burns
- Gertrude Bennett as Kit
- Connie La Mont as Doll
- Buff Jones as Red
- Bud Osborne as Rustler

== Bibliography ==
- Pitts, Michael R. Western Movies: A Guide to 5,105 Feature Films. McFarland, 2012. ISBN 978-1-4766-0090-1
