= Phantom Gold (1938 film) =

1938 film

- Directed by: Joseph Levering
- Written by: Nate Gatzert
- Produced by: Larry Darmour
- Starring: Jack Luden; Beth Marion; Slim Whitaker
- Cinematography: James S. Brown Jr.
- Edited by: Dwight Caldwell
- Music by: Lee Zahler
- Production company: Larry Darmour Productions
- Distributed by: Columbia Pictures
- Release date: August 31, 1938
- Running time: 56 minutes
- Country: United States
- Language: English

Phantom Gold is a 1938 American Western film directed by Joseph Levering and starring Jack Luden, Beth Marion and Slim Whitaker.

== Cast ==
- Jack Luden as Breezy
- Beth Marion as Mary Davis
- Barry Downing as Buddy Wright
- Slim Whitaker as Rattler
- Hal Taliaferro as Dan
- Art Davis as Happy
- Jimmy Robinson as Pancake
- Jack Ingram as Henchman Pete
- Buzz Barton as Bart
- Marin Sais as Mag Smith
- Forrest Taylor as Henry Wright

== Bibliography ==
- Pitts, Michael R. Western Movies: A Guide to 5,105 Feature Films. McFarland, 2012.
