= Barbara Sheldon =

American actress

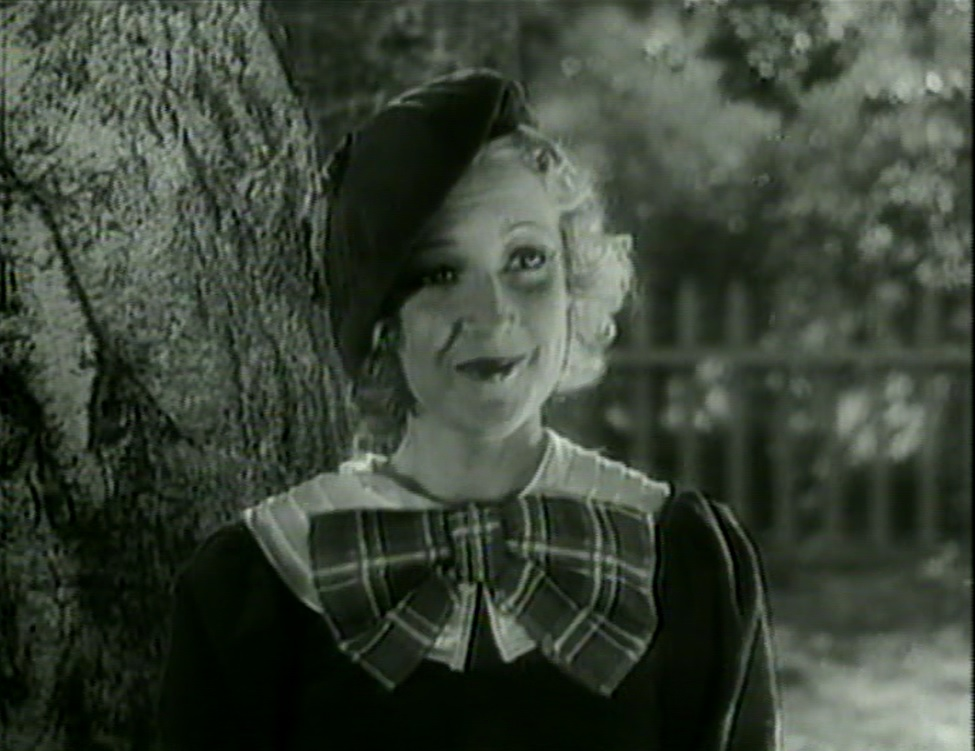
- Sheldon in The Lucky Texan
- Born: November 24, 1912; New Orleans, Louisiana, U.S.
- Died: October 19, 2007 (aged 94)
- Occupation: Actor
- Years active: 1933–1934

Barbara Sheldon (November 24, 1912 – October 19, 2007) was an American film actress of the early 1930s.

== Career ==
She started her film career in 1933 in Stolen by Gypsies or Beer and Bicycles, and starred in two other films that same year. Her best known role was when she starred opposite John Wayne in the 1934 film The Lucky Texan. She was able to land the role due to her excellent horsemanship. It would be her last film. With no other roles coming her way, she retired from acting.

Her newspaper biography for ''The Lucky Texan'' says she was born in New Orleans, where she also learned to ride, and had hopes of becoming a jockey. She later moved to Hartford, Connecticut where she performed with Jimmy Thatcher's theater troupe.

She died at the age of 94 on October 19, 2007.

== Filmography ==
- Stolen by Gypsies or Beer and Bicycles (1933)
- Fits in a Fiddle (1933)
- Flying Down to Rio (1933) (uncredited)
- The Lucky Texan (1934)
