= The Lucky Texan =

1934 film

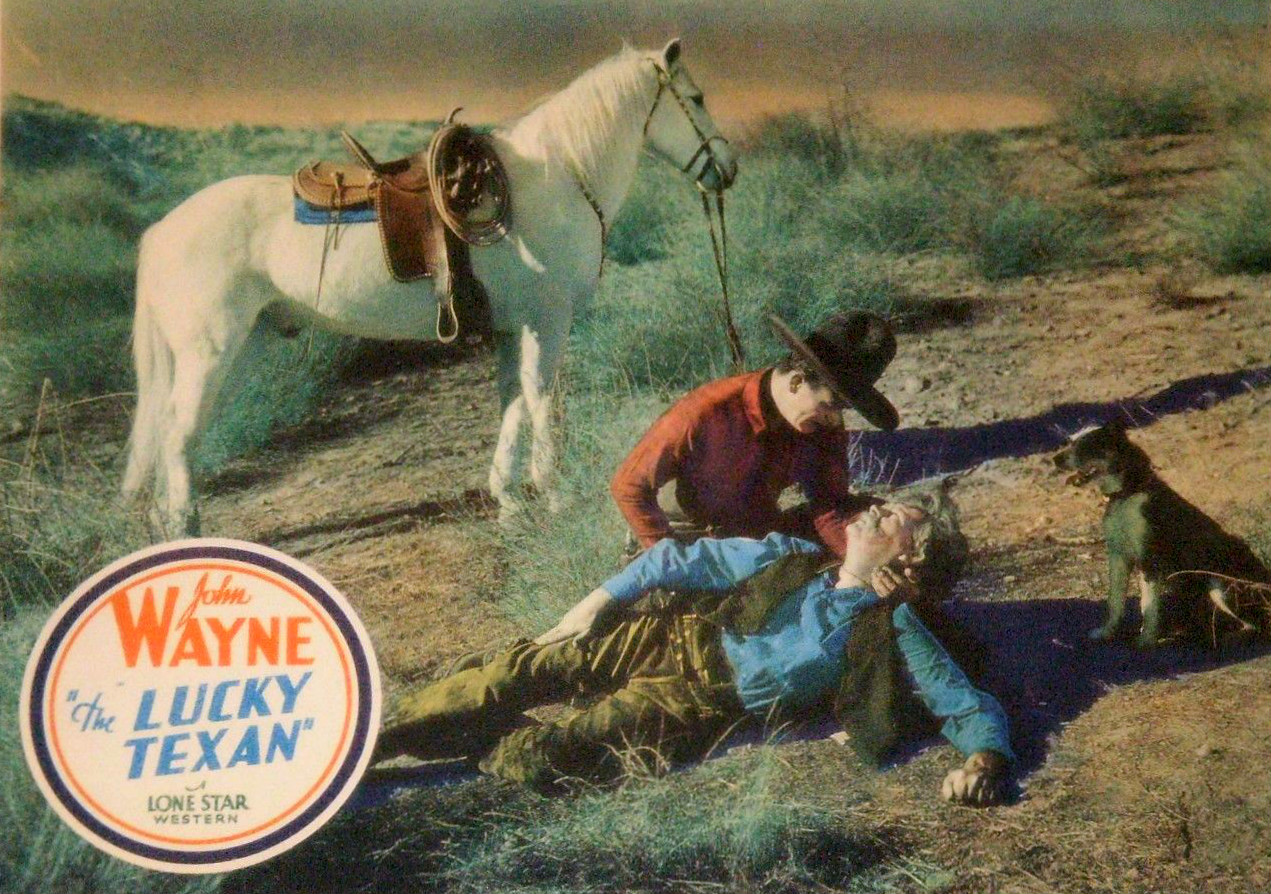
- Lobby card
- Directed by: Robert N. Bradbury
- Written by: Robert N. Bradbury
- Produced by: Paul Malvern
- Starring: John Wayne; Barbara Sheldon; George Hayes; Lloyd Whitlock; Yakima Canutt
- Cinematography: Archie Stout
- Edited by: Carl Pierson
- Distributed by: Monogram Pictures Corporation
- Release date: January 22, 1934
- Running time: 55 minutes
- Country: United States
- Language: English

The Lucky Texan

The Lucky Texan is a 1934 American Lonestar Films B-movie Western film featuring John Wayne, Barbara Sheldon, Gabby Hayes, and the legendary stuntman and actor Yakima Canutt. It was written and directed by Robert N. Bradbury. It also contains a rare (perhaps unique) appearance by "Gabby" Hayes without a beard and in drag.

The script's original working title was Gold Strike River, and the film was years later released in a colorized version on home video under that title.

The plot concerns Wayne finding gold and making the mistake of trusting the local assayer.

WNBC-TV has used a continuous loop of this from the transmitter site during testing or as emergency filler when the feed from the station has been cut off.

== Plot ==
Jerry visits his uncle Grandy after finishing college and they decide to look after the ranch. Grandy informs Jerry of the arrival of his grand daughter Betty and they both look forward to her joining them. One day while fixing a horse's hoof they find gold embedded in the hoof. They go to the creek and strike it gold. They bring the gold to the local assayer Mr. Harris who along with his associate Mr. Cole has been stealing Grandy's cattle. They plot to deprive Grandy of his ranch.

Everyone wants to know where Grandy and Jerry are finding their gold but they cannot trace them. One day when Grandy is at the assayer selling his mined gold the assayer cheats him into a signing away his ranch - making him think Grandy is just signing a receipt. Then a few days later they track Grandy down, finding him alone and attempt to kill him. Grandy however is knocked off his horse, suffers a head wound and falls unconscious. Mr. Harris and Mr. Cole then double back to the ranch.

Meanwhile, Grandy's dog and mule find Jerry, he is prompted to find Grandy and they decide to keep his survival a secret. As they are talking, Mr. Harris and Mr. Cole arrive at the ranch and claim to own it.

Jerry goes to town on some legal business when Mr. Harris and Mr. Cole have him arrested for suspicion of murdering Grandy. Jerry is then held for a court summons. When Betty comes to visit him in jail, Jerry tells her to bring Grandy to court in disguise.

The next day Grandy shows up in court and identifies the crooked assayers as attempted murderers. The two jump out of the court house window and escape. Jerry, Grandy and the Sheriff pursue the duo. Jerry captures Cole and Grandy captures Mr. Harris. The movie ends with Betty and Jerry getting married.

== Cast ==
- John Wayne as Jerry Mason
- Barbara Sheldon as Betty Benson
- Lloyd Whitlock as Harris
- George "Gabby" Hayes as Jake "Grandy" Benson
- Yakima Canutt as Joe Cole
- Eddie Parker as Al Miller, the sheriff's son
- Gordon De Main as Williams, the banker
- Earl Dwire as Sheriff Miller

== See also ==
- John Wayne filmography
