= Death Rides the Range =

1939 film

- Theatrical release poster
- Directed by: Sam Newfield
- Written by: Oliver Drake (story) (uncredited); William Lively (screenplay)
- Produced by: Arthur Alexander; Max Alexander
- Starring: See below
- Cinematography: Arthur Reed
- Edited by: Holbrook N. Todd
- Music by: Lew Porter
- Production company: Colony Pictures
- Release date: 1939
- Running time: 58 minutes
- Country: United States
- Language: English

Death Rides the Range is a 1939 American Western film directed by Sam Newfield. It was a Colony Pictures film.

== Plot ==
A group of international scientists are after helium used for airships of a foreign power. FBI Special Agent Ken Baxter, "from nowhere and going the same place" and his sidekicks Pancho and Panhandle stop them.

== Cast ==
- Ken Maynard as Ken Baxter
- Fay McKenzie as Letty Morgan
- Ralph Peters as Panhandle
- Julian Rivero as Pancho
- Charles King as Joe Larkin
- John Elliott as Hiram Crabtree
- Willy Castello as Dr. Flotow
- Sven Hugo Borg as Baron Strakoff
- Michael Vallon as Dr. Wahl
- Julian Madison as Jim Morgan
- Kenneth Rhodes as Slim
- Tarzan as Tarzan, Ken's Horse

== Soundtrack ==
- Kenneth Rhodes - "Get Along My Pal" (Written by Colin MacDonald)
