= Joe De La Cruz (actor) =

Mexican-American actor (1892–1961)

- Born: March 19, 1892; Sonora, Mexico
- Died: December 14, 1961 (aged 69); Los Angeles, California, USA
- Occupation: Actor

Joe De La Cruz was a Mexican-American character actor who worked in Hollywood from the late 1910s through the early 1940s. He often played villains.

== Selected filmography ==
- Under Fiesta Stars (1941)
- Adventures of Captain Marvel (1941)
- North West Mounted Police (1940)
- The Tulsa Kid (1940)
- South of the Border (1939)
- Frontiers of '49 (1939)
- Panamint's Bad Man (1938)
- The Fighting Devil Dogs (1938)
- The Vigilantes Are Coming (1936)
- Unconquered Bandit (1935)
- Four Frightened People (1934)
- Law and Lawless (1932)
- The Forty-Niners (1932)
- Trailing the Killer (1932)
- Hidden Valley (1932)
- The Hurricane Horseman (1931)
- Rogue of the Rio Grande (1930)
- A Devil with Women (1930)
- Call of the West (1930)
- Hell's Heroes (1929)
- Western Yesterdays (1924)
- The Santa Fe Trail (1923)
- The Bearcat (1922)
- The Night Riders (1920)
