= Avenging Waters =

1936 film

- Theatrical release poster
- Directed by: Spencer Gordon Bennet
- Written by: Nate Gatzert
- Produced by: Larry Darmour
- Starring: Ken Maynard; Beth Marion; Ward Bond; John Elliott
- Cinematography: James S. Brown Jr.
- Edited by: Dwight Caldwell
- Production company: Larry Darmour Productions
- Distributed by: Columbia Pictures
- Release date: May 8, 1936
- Running time: 56 minutes
- Country: United States
- Language: English

Avenging Waters is a 1936 American Western film directed by Spencer Gordon Bennet and starring Ken Maynard, Beth Marion, Ward Bond and John Elliott. It was written by Nate Gatzert.

== Plot ==
Charles Mortimer buys cattle from Ken Morley and builds a fence to keep them in. His neighbour, Slater, is angered by Mortimer's actions because he wants access to the land. By way of revenge, he builds a dam cutting off Mortimer's water supply. Morley confronts Slater, and Slater captures and imprisons him in a shack. The dam is subsequently destroyed by lightning, and the shack holding Morley is in the path of the oncoming wall of water. Aided by his horse and a stout rope, Morley is able to get the bars off the shack window and escape the shack, riding toward Mortimer's place just ahead of the water. Mortimer and his henchman hear the water coming and flee the ranch on horseback, riding double. But they've left behind another prisoner, the girl. Morley is just in time to scoop her up in his arms and ride up a nearby hillock to safety, as the water, having already destroyed his shack-prison, rushes over top of the Mortimer ranch. They get married, and Mortimer and his man are never heard from again.

== Cast ==
- Ken Maynard as Ken Morley
- Beth Marion as Mary Mortimer
- Ward Bond as Marve Slater
- John Elliott as Charles Mortimer
- Zella Russell as Aunt Eloise Smythe
- Hal Taliaferro as Slivers
- The Stafford Sisters as comic singers (uncredited)
