= Dodge City Trail (film) =

1936 film by Charles C. Coleman

- Directed by: Charles C. Coleman
- Starring: Charles Starrett; Donald Grayson; Marion Weldon
- Cinematography: George Meehan
- Edited by: Richard Fantl
- Production company: Columbia Pictures
- Distributed by: Columbia Pictures
- Release date: December 12, 1936
- Running time: 56 minutes
- Country: United States
- Language: English

Dodge City Trail is a 1936 American Western film directed by Charles C. Coleman. It stars Charles Starrett, Donald Grayson, and Marion Weldon.

== Cast ==
- Charles Starrett as Steve Braddock
- Donald Grayson as Slim Grayson
- Marion Weldon as Marian Phillips
- Russell Hicks as Kenyon Phillips
- Si Jenks as Rawhide
- Al Bridge as Dawson
- Art Mix as Blackie
- Ernie Adams as Dillon
- Lew Meehan as Joe
- Hank Bell as Red
