= Robert F. Hill =

Canadian film director and screenwriter

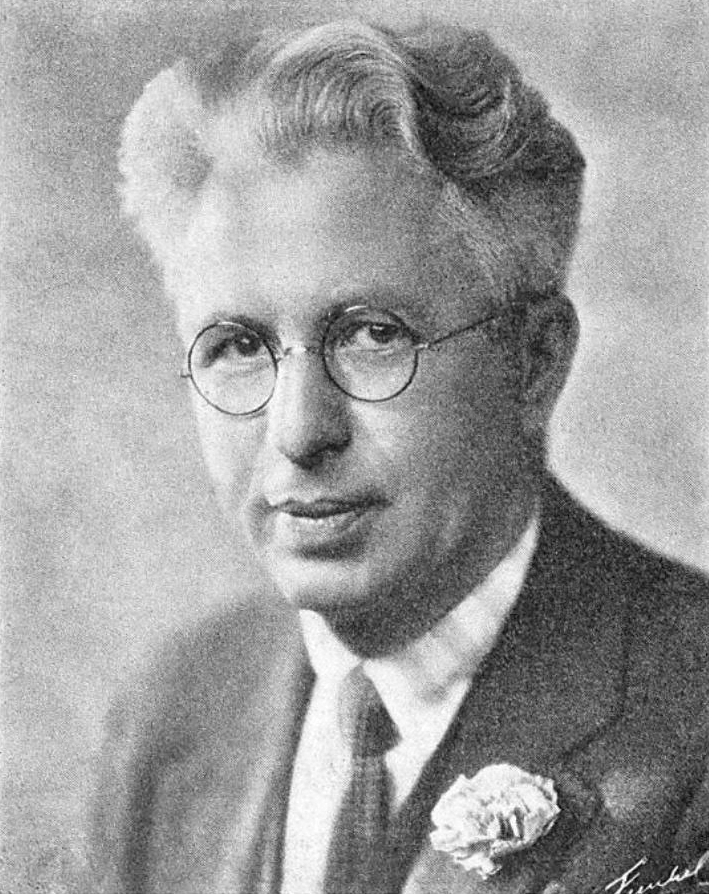
- Born: April 14, 1886; Port Rowan, Ontario, Canada
- Died: March 18, 1966 (aged 79); Los Angeles, California, U.S.
- Other names: Robert Allen; Jimmy Hawkey; Rock Hawkey; Rock Hawley; Bob F. Hill; Bob Hill; Robert Hill; Robt. F. Hill; Bob Stillman
- Occupations: Actor, director, screenwriter
- Years active: 1915–1966

Robert F. Hill (April 14, 1886 – March 18, 1966) was a Canadian-American film director, screenwriter, and actor.

== Career ==
Bob Hill began his screen career in 1915 at Universal Pictures. In those early days, members of film crews were sometimes called upon to do double duty, and young actor Hill also showed a talent for writing and directing. Universal had several popular series of short subjects, and Hill contributed to several. He became an action specialist, working in Westerns, outdoor adventures, and serials.

Like other established silent-film directors Christy Cabanne, William Beaudine, Elmer Clifton, Lambert Hillyer, and Harry Fraser, Hill was given fewer major assignments in talking pictures. Although Hill began the sound era with Universal, he soon was forced to freelance for independent producers like Sol Lesser, Max and Arthur Alexander, and Sam Katzman. Sometimes the producers' budgets were so very low that Hill was challenged to make his films look presentable. His 1935 serial Queen of the Jungle was largely composed of silent footage filmed in 1922 for The Jungle Goddess; Hill shot new "jungle" scenes on an indoor soundstage to tie the silent material together. Likewise, Hill's 1937 serial Shadow of Chinatown, starring Bela Lugosi, suffered from Sam Katzman's typically cheap production mountings, but Hill (under the pseudonym Rock Hawkey) fashioned a serviceable screenplay that kept the various perils within the budget.

Hill became one of Katzman's standbys, sometimes directing Olympic athlete and action star Herman Brix. Hill's last film for Katzman was East Side Kids (1940), launching a popular knockoff of the Dead End Kids. Hill returned to direct major-studio work only once; he co-directed Universal's 1938 serial Flash Gordon's Trip to Mars.

Hill often played cameo roles in films he directed – not out of vanity, but because he was handy if an actor was suddenly needed. In the 1940s Hill gave up the feverish pace of low-budget filmmaking and returned to acting full-time. Now white-haired and bespectacled, he played doctors, ministers, judges, and professional men.

He retired from the industry in 1950, and died in Los Angeles on March 18, 1966 at the age of 79.

== Selected filmography ==
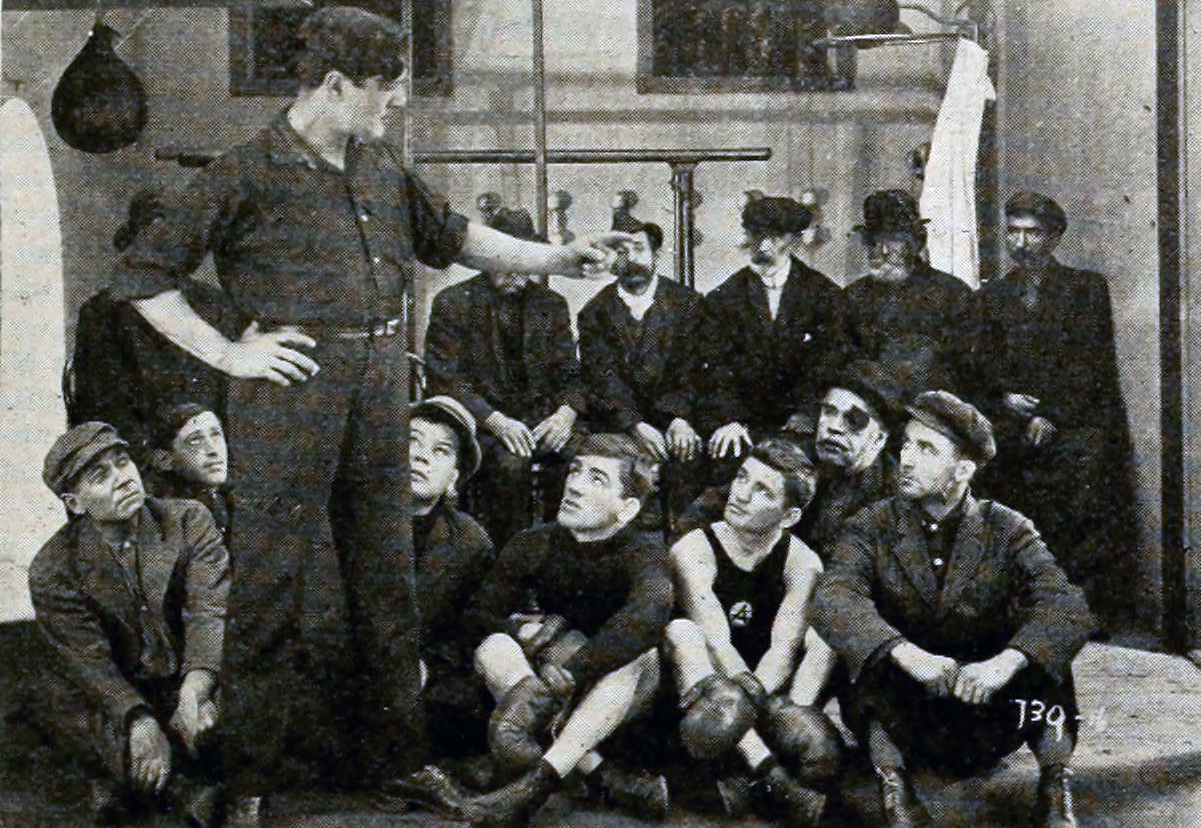
Temptation and the Man (1916)

Year	Film	Role	Notes
1915	Destiny's Trump Card	-	Story
1919	The Great Radium Mystery	-	Director
1919	Almost a Husband	-	Story
1919	Jubilo	-	Story
1919	Full of Pep	-	Story
1920	The Flaming Disc	-	Director
1920	Water, Water, Everywhere	-	Story
1921	The Adventures of Tarzan	-	Director, writer
1922	The Adventures of Robinson Crusoe	-	Director
1923	Around the World in Eighteen Days	-	Director
1923	The Social Buccaneer	-	Director
1923	The Phantom Fortune	-	Director
1925	Idaho	-	Director
1925	Wild West	-	Director
1926	The Bar-C Mystery	-	Director
1927	The Return of the Riddle Rider	-	Director
1927	Blake of Scotland Yard	-	Director, writer
1927	The Cat and the Canary	-	Adaptation
1928	Life's Mockery	-	Director
1928	Haunted Island	-	Director
1928	A Million for Love	-	Director
1931	Heroes of the Flames	-	Director
1931	Sundown Trail	-	Director
1932	Love Bound	Ship passenger	Director
1932	The Last Frontier	-	Writer
1933	Tarzan the Fearless	-	Director
1934	A Demon for Trouble	-	Director
1934	Frontier Days	-	Director
1934	Cowboy Holiday	Mr. Hopkins, Ruth's Father	Director, writer
1935	Queen of the Jungle	-	Director
1935	Danger Trails	-	Director
1936	Prison Shadows	-	Director
1936	Rip Roarin' Buckaroo	-	Director
1936	The Phantom of the Range	Auctioneer Robert	Director
1936	Idaho Kid	-	Director
1936	Shadow of Chinatown	Serial and/or Feature film	Director
1937	Cheyenne Rides Again	Townsman	Director
1938	Flash Gordon's Trip to Mars	-	Director
1939	Overland Mail		Director
1941	Flying Wild	Mr. Woodward	
1943	Keep 'Em Slugging	Mr. Woodward	Credited as Bob Hill
1943	Wild Horse Rustlers	Judge	
1943	Wolves of the Range	Judge Brandon	
1943	Calling Dr. Death	Judge	Uncredited
1944	Men on Her Mind	Undetermined role	Uncredited
