= Forrest Taylor =

American actor (1883–1965)

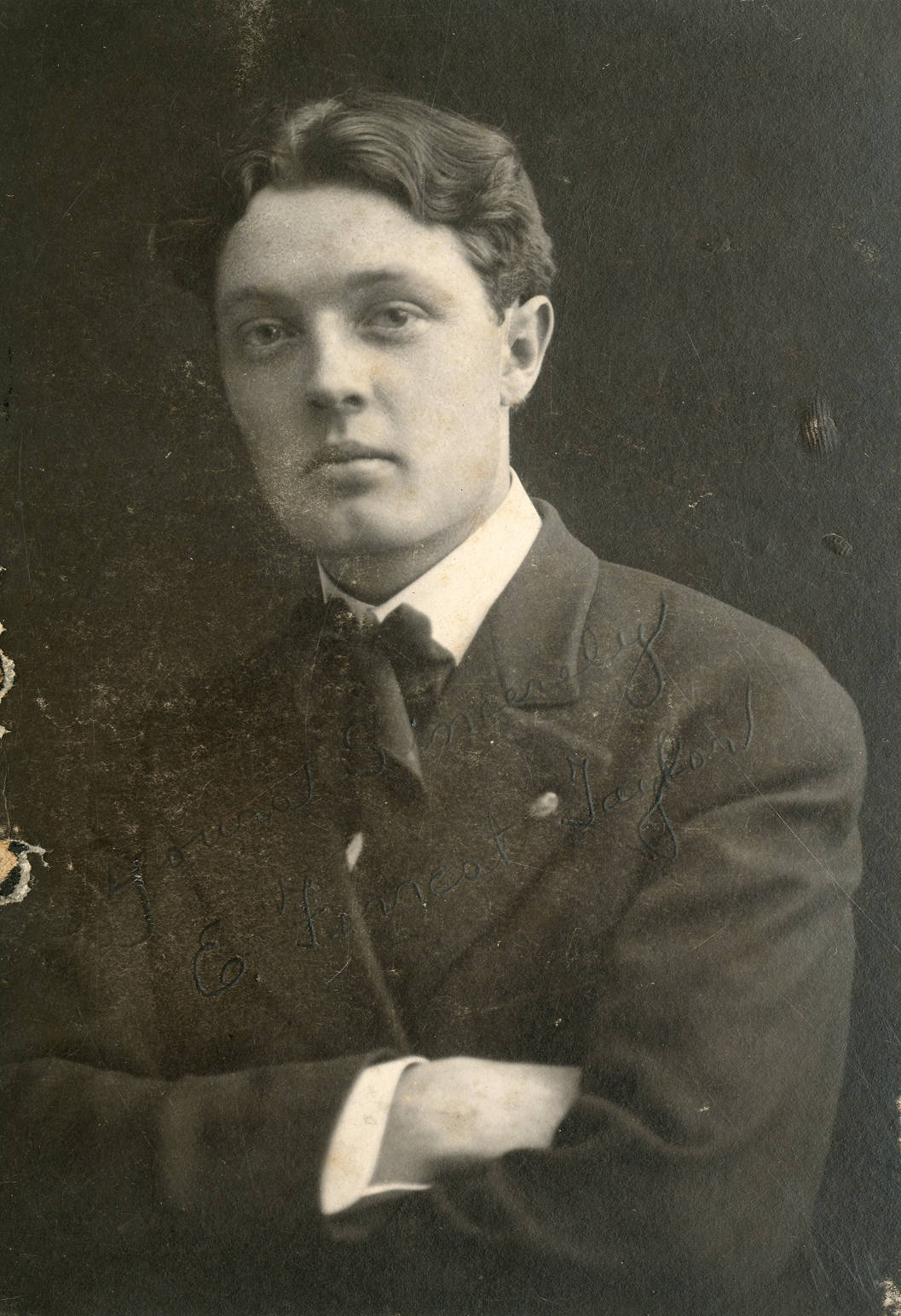
- Taylor in 1911
- Born: Edwin Forrest Taylor; December 29, 1883; Bloomington, Illinois
- Died: February 19, 1965 (aged 81); Garden Grove, California
- Occupation: Actor
- Years active: 1915–1963
- Spouse: Ada Daniels (? - ?)
- Children: 1 son 1 daughter
- Parent(s): Mr. and Mrs. Chris Taylor

Edwin Forrest Taylor (December 29, 1883 – February 19, 1965) was an American character actor whose artistic career spanned six different decades, from silents through talkies to the advent of color films.

== Early years ==
Taylor was born in Bloomington, Illinois. His father managed the Dreamland Theatre in Kewanee, Illinois, and a news item in 1916 reported, "Manager Chris Taylor of Dreamland at Kewanee features his son, E. Forrest Taylor, in Western pictures every Monday."

== Career ==
=== Stage ===
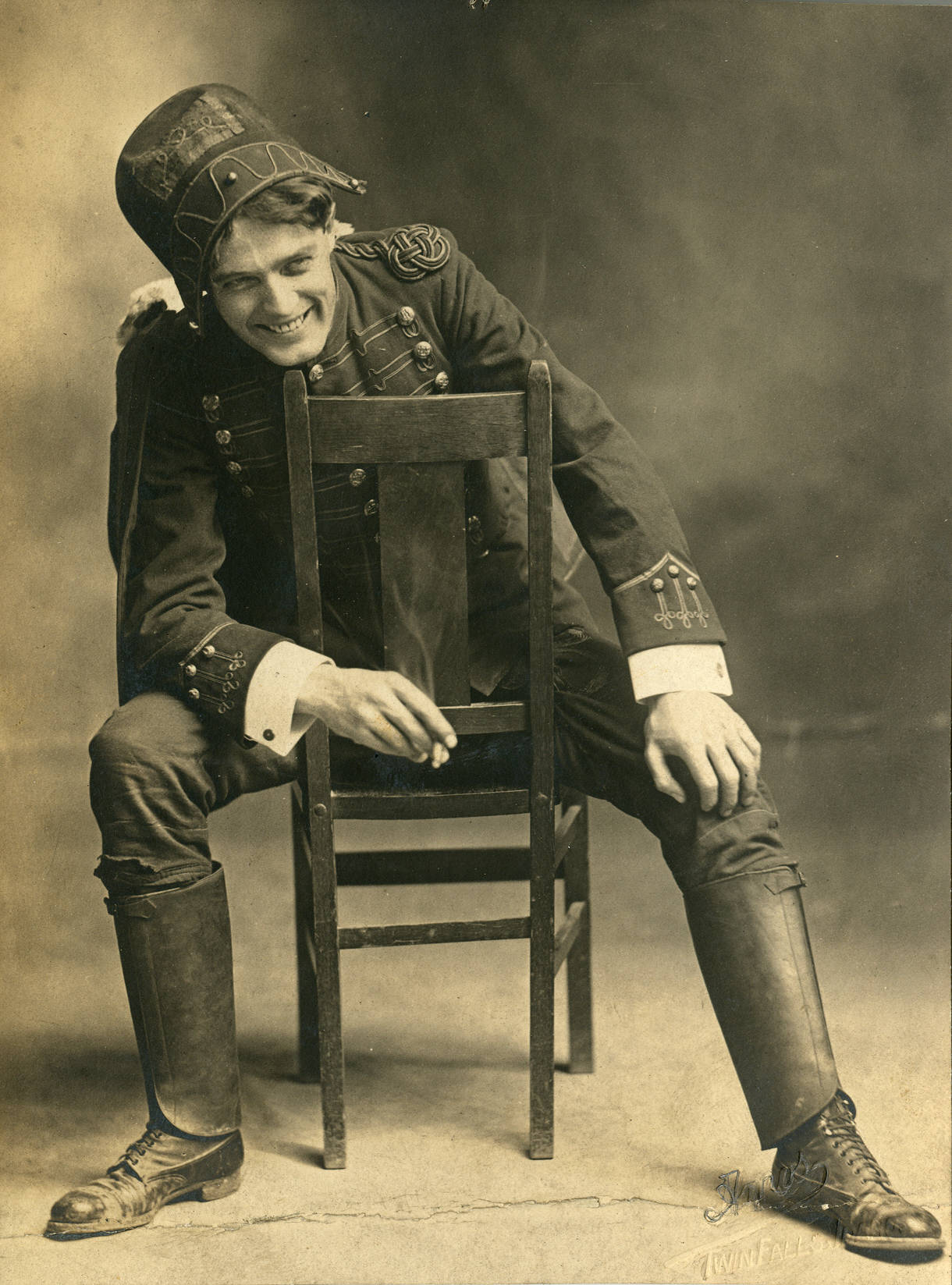
E. Forrest Taylor in 1911

Taylor was a veteran of the stage by the time he started appearing as a silent lead in both short and feature-length films. His talents extended beyond acting to include management. The Richfield Reaper, in a January 23, 1908, article, wrote about Taylor's efforts with the Empire Amusement Company, saying, "Mr. Taylor certainly deserves success as when he took hold of the company it was badly disorganized and in debt, but he has brought order out of the chaos and is now in good shape ..."

A newspaper article published in The Arizona Republic on October 13, 1922, described Taylor and Anne Berryman as "two of the best known players in the western portion of the country." At that time, Taylor headed his own troupe after having spent nine months with the Majestic Theatre Players in Los Angeles.

Taylor's Broadway credits include Open House (1947) and We, the People (1932).

=== Film ===
Taylor essayed prime roles in the films The Terror of Twin Mountains (1915), Sunset Country (1915), April (1916), True Nobility (1916) and The Abandonment (1916), before joining the army during World War I. He would not return to films until 1926, appearing in A Poor Girl's Romance.

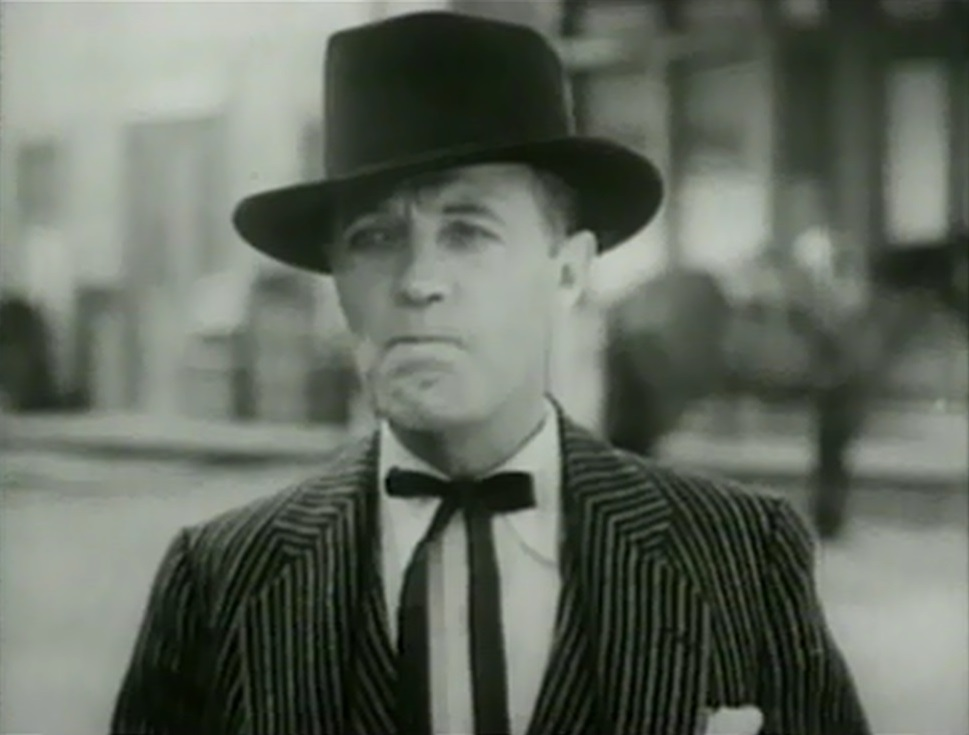
Riders of Destiny in 1933

During the 1930s, Taylor became entrenched as a supporting player in B-westerns and several cliffhanger serials, often playing either the action or brains heavy roles. As he grew older and grayer, Taylor migrated to nice guy roles, such as the father of the heroine, a lawman, or a scientist.

Taylor is identified in about 400 films, including 325 sound era films and of those, 201 are westerns and 36 are chapterplays, according to the Internet Movie Database. As well, his credits at Republic Pictures number about 75 for the period 1937-1953 (most all of these are B-westerns and serials).

His last film was Bitter Creek (1954).

=== Television ===
After the westerns and serials faded Taylor migrated to television work. From 1952 through 1954, he costarred as Grandpa Fisher on the religious TV series This is the Life. In 1960 Taylor appeared as the Minister on the TV western Cheyenne in the episode titled "The Long Rope." He retired in 1963 after filming an episode of Ripcord.

== Personal life ==
Taylor was married to actress Ada Daniels, and the two appeared together in stage productions. They had a son and a daughter.

== Death ==
Taylor died of natural causes on February 19, 1965, in Garden Grove, California, at the age of 81.

== Filmography ==
=== Films ===
- The Abandonment (1916) (film debut)
- The Social Pirates (1916)
- No Man's Gold (1926)
- Reno (1930)
- The Death Kiss (1932)
- Turn Back the Clock (1933)
- One Man's Journey (1933)
- Broadway to Hollywood (1933)
- Riders of Destiny (1933)
- The Mysterious Mr. Wong (1934)
- The Gilded Lily (1935)
- Shadow of Doubt (1935)
- Mississippi (1935)
- Trail of Terror (1935)
- The Widow from Monte Carlo (1935)
- Charlie Chan at the Race Track (1936)
- Reefer Madness (1936)
- Prison Shadows (1936) as George Miller
- Men of the Plains (1936)
- Where Trails Divide (1937)
- Riders of the Dawn (1937)
- Phantom Gold (1938)
- Heroes of the Hills (1938)
- Gun Packer (1938)
- Frontier Town (1938)
- Meet Dr. Christian (1939)
- Young Tom Edison (1940)
- The Golden Trail (1940)
- The Sagebrush Family Trails West (1940)
- Boys of the City (1940)
- That Gang of Mine (1940)
- Trailing Double Trouble (1940)
- Billy the Kid's Gun Justice (1940)
- Wild Horse Range (1940)
- The Lone Rider Rides On (1941)
- Flying Wild (1941)
- Wrangler's Roost (1941)
- The Singing Hill (1941)
- Underground Rustlers (1941)
- Reap the Wild Wind (1942)
- The Spoilers (1942)
- In Old California (1942)
- Bullets for Bandits (1942)
- Arizona Stage Coach (1942)
- Trail Riders (1942)
- Hangmen Also Die! (1943)
- Corregidor (1943)
- Air Raid Wardens (1943)
- The Kansan (1943)
- Land of Hunted Men (1943)
- Bullets and Saddles (1943)
- Lady in the Death House (1944)
- Wilson (1944)
- Sundown Valley (1944)
- Can't Help Singing (1944)
- Rockin' in the Rockies (1945)
- Bewitched (1945)
- Strange Impersonation (1946)
- Lady Luck (1946)
- Renegade Girl (1946)
- Trail Street (1947)
- The Sea of Grass (1947)
- Unconquered (1947)
- Yankee Fakir (1947)
- Shadow Valley (1947)
- Albuquerque (1948)
- Return of the Bad Men (1948)
- Four Faces West (1948)
- The Golden Eye (1948)
- South of St. Louis (1949)
- Death Valley Gunfighter (1949)
- The Gal Who Took the West (1949)
- The Pecos Pistol (1949)
- Montana (1950)
- Johnny One-Eye (1950)
- Winchester '73 (1950)
- Close to My Heart (1951)
- Lone Star (1952)
- Rancho Notorious (1952)
- Ma and Pa Kettle at the Fair (1952)
- Flaming Feather (1952)
- The Story of Will Rogers (1952)
- Untamed Frontier (1952)
- Gunsmoke (1953) - Cal (uncredited)
- Iron Mountain Trail (1953) - Sam Sawyer
- The Marshal's Daughter (1953) - Uncle Jed (uncredited)
- Calamity Jane (1953) - Mcpherson - Minister (uncredited)
- The Boy from Oklahoma (1954) - Doctor (uncredited)
- Rails Into Laramie (1954) - Hank (uncredited)
- Dawn at Socorro (1954) - Jebb Hayes
- Footsteps in the Night (1957) - Shaw, Sunset Vista Manager (uncredited)
- Man of a Thousand Faces (1957) - Miracle Man (uncredited)
- The FBI Story (1959) - Wedding Minister (final film, uncredited)

=== Serials ===
- The Fighting Devil Dogs (1938)
- Dick Tracy Returns (1938)
- The Phantom Creeps (1939)
- The Lone Ranger Rides Again (1939)
- The Oregon Trail (1939)
- Terry and the Pirates (1940)
- Deadwood Dick (1940)
- The Green Archer (1940)
- The Spider Returns (1941, Serial)
- The Iron Claw (1941)
- King of the Texas Rangers (1941)
- Sea Raiders (1941)
- Dick Tracy vs. Crime Inc. (1941)
- Perils of the Royal Mounted (1942)
- Perils of Nyoka (1942)
- King of the Mounties (1942)
- The Valley of Vanishing Men (1942)
- Black Arrow (1944)
- The Desert Hawk (1944)
- Haunted Harbor (1944)
- Zorro's Black Whip (1944)
- Manhunt of Mystery Island (1945)
- The Crimson Ghost (1946)
- The Black Widow (1947)
- Superman (1948) - Leeds [Chs. 3-4]
- Tex Granger (1948)
- Bruce Gentry (1949)
- The Lost Planet (1953) - Prof. Edmund Dorn

== Television appearances ==
- The Cisco Kid (1950-1953) - Red Bell/Sheriff/Reverend Calvin Whitacre/Rev. William Smiley/Norman Slade, Cattle Inspector/Nugget City Sheriff/John Warren, Railroad President/Replaced by Leary/ Sheriff/Hale, Durado Banker
- The Adventures of Wild Bill Hickok (1952) - Old Ira Beecher
- The Roy Rogers Show (1952-1955) - Joe Salem /Al Houston/Beaver Gramps Jones aka Gramps/Ned Virges/Sheriff/Doc Seavers
- Annie Oakley (1954) - Ed Willis/Dr. Thomas Moody
- Lassie (1955-1961) - Dr. Spencer/Judge Amos Porter
- Four Star Playhouse (1955) - Dr. Washburn
- Medic (1955) - Dr. Marvin
- Waterfront (1955) - Si Walker
- My Friend Flicka (1956) - Saginaw/Judge Spencer
- Official Detective (1957) - Hunter
- The Life and Legend of Wyatt Earp (1956-1957) - Todd/Col. Fentress
- Doc Martin (1957) - Doc Martin
- The Lineup (1958) - Jake Duncan
- Dick Powell's Zane Grey Theater (1958) - Dr. Caslin
- The Restless Gun (1958) - Doc
- Father Knows Best (1959) - Painter
- The Dennis O'Keefe Show (1959) - Julius Valentine
- Man Without a Gun (1959) - Doc Brannon
- Overland Trail (1960) - Doctor
- Tales of Wells Fargo (1959-1960) - Pop Kyle/Mr. Monroe
- Cheyenne (1960-1961) - Minister/Doctor
- Maverick (1960) - Proprietor
- Wanted: Dead or Alive (1960) - Dr. Russell (uncredited)
- M Squad (1960) - Pop Larsen (uncredited)
- Lawman (1960) - Sheriff Dawson
- Bonanza (1960–1962) - John/Rancher
- The Law and Mr. Jones (1962) - Foreman
- Ripcord (1963) - Martin Seims
