= Terry and the Pirates (serial) =

1940 film by James W. Horne

- Directed by: James W. Horne
- Screenplay by: Mark Layton; George Morgan; Joseph Levering
- Based on: (based on the comic strip by) Terry and the Pirates created by Milton Caniff
- Produced by: Larry Darmour
- Starring: William Tracy; Granville Owen; Joyce Bryant
- Cinematography: James S. Brown Jr.
- Edited by: Dwight Caldwell; Earl Turner
- Music by: Lee Zahler
- Production company: Columbia Pictures
- Distributed by: Columbia Pictures
- Release date: May 5, 1940
- Running time: 300 minutes (15 episodes)
- Country: United States
- Language: English

Terry and the Pirates (1940) is the 10th film serial released by Columbia. It is based on the comic strip Terry and the Pirates created by Milton Caniff. In his biography, Meanwhile..., Caniff stated that he hated the serial for changing so much of his comic strip, and that "I saw the first chapter and walked out screaming".

== Plot ==
Young explorer Terry Lee and his grown-up sidekick, Pat Ryan, arrive in the Asian jungles in search of Terry's father, Dr. Herbert Lee. The elder Lee is an archaeologist, and the leader of a scientific expedition seeking evidence of a lost civilization. Soon, Terry discovers that his father has been kidnapped by an armed pirate gang known as the Leopard Men. The gang is led by the evil Master Fang, a local warlord who controls half of the natives and holds the white settlers in fear. Fang is seeking the riches hidden beneath the Sacred Temple of Mara. Terry meets the Dragon Lady, who is determined that her kingdom shall not be invaded. Attacked by Fang, his henchman Stanton, and the Leopard Men, Terry and Pat try valiantly to locate the missing Dr. Lee, uncover the secrets of the lost civilization, and recover the hidden treasure of Mara. After joining forces with Connie, Normandie, and the Dragon Lady, the heroes have myriad varied adventures in the inhospitable environment.

== Cast ==
- William Tracy as Terry Lee
- Jeff York as Pat Ryan (credited as Granville Owen)
- Joyce Bryant as Normandie Drake
- Allen Jung as Connie-aka George Webster Confucious
- Victor DeCamp as Big Stoop (as Victor De Camp)
- Sheila Darcy as The Dragon Lady
- Dick Curtis as Master Fang
- John Paul Jones as Dr. Herbert Lee (as J. Paul Jones)
- Forrest Taylor as Allen Drake
- Jack Ingram as Stanton

== Chapter titles ==
1. Into the Great Unknown
2. The Fang Strikes
3. The Mountain of Death
4. The Dragon Queen Threatens
5. At the Mercy of the Mob
6. The Scroll of Wealth
7. Angry Waters
8. The Tomb of Peril
9. Jungle Hurricane
10. Too Many Enemies
11. Walls of Doom
12. No Escape
13. The Fatal Mistake
14. Pyre of Death
15. The Secret of the Temple

== See also ==
- List of American films of 1940
- List of film serials by year
- List of film serials by studio

Preceded by The Shadow (1940)	Columbia Serial; Terry and the Pirates (1940)	Succeeded by Deadwood Dick (1940)
