= The Rangers Step In =

1937 film by Spencer Gordon Bennet

- Theatrical release poster
- Directed by: Spencer Gordon Bennet
- Screenplay by: Nate Gatzert
- Story by: Joseph Levering; Jesse Duffy
- Produced by: Larry Darmour
- Starring: Robert Allen; Eleanor Stewart; John Merton; Wally Wales; Jack Ingram; Jack Rockwell
- Cinematography: James S. Brown Jr.
- Edited by: Dwight Caldwell
- Production company: Columbia Pictures
- Distributed by: Columbia Pictures
- Release date: August 8, 1937
- Running time: 58 minutes
- Country: United States
- Language: English

The Rangers Step In is a 1937 American Western film directed by Spencer Gordon Bennet and written by Nate Gatzert. The film stars Robert Allen, Eleanor Stewart, John Merton, Wally Wales, Jack Ingram and Jack Rockwell. The film was released on August 8, 1937, by Columbia Pictures.

== Cast ==
- Robert Allen as Bob Allen
- Eleanor Stewart as Terry Warren
- John Merton as Martin
- Wally Wales as Breck Warren
- Jack Ingram as Fred
- Jack Rockwell as Marshal
- Jay Wilsey as Ranger Capt. Thomas
- Lafe McKee as Jed Warren
