= Reckless Ranger =

1937 film by Spencer Gordon Bennet

- Theatrical release poster
- Directed by: Spencer Gordon Bennet
- Screenplay by: Nate Gatzert
- Story by: Joseph Levering; Jesse Duffy
- Produced by: Larry Darmour
- Starring: Robert Allen; Louise Small; Mary MacLaren; Harry Woods; Jack Perrin; Buddy Cox
- Cinematography: Bert Longenecker
- Edited by: Dwight Caldwell
- Production company: Larry Darmour Productions
- Distributed by: Columbia Pictures
- Release date: May 30, 1937
- Running time: 56 minutes
- Country: United States
- Language: English

Reckless Ranger is a 1937 American Western film directed by Spencer Gordon Bennet and written by Nate Gatzert. The film stars Robert Allen, Louise Small, Mary MacLaren, Harry Woods, Jack Perrin and Buddy Cox. The film was released on May 30, 1937, by Columbia Pictures.

== Cast ==
- Robert Allen as Jim Allen / Bob Allen
- Louise Small as Mildred Newton
- Mary MacLaren as Mary Allen
- Harry Woods as Barlowe
- Jack Perrin as Chet Newton
- Buddy Cox as Jimmie Allen
- Jack Rockwell as Mort
- Slim Whitaker as Steve
- Roger Williams as Snager
