= Ellery Queen, Master Detective =

- Theatrical release poster
- Directed by: Kurt Neumann
- Screenplay by: Eric Taylor
- Story by: Ellery Queen
- Produced by: Larry Darmour
- Starring: Ralph Bellamy; Margaret Lindsay; Charley Grapewin; James Burke; Michael Whalen; Marsha Hunt
- Cinematography: James S. Brown Jr.
- Edited by: Dwight Caldwell
- Music by: Lee Zahler
- Production company: Larry Darmour Productions
- Distributed by: Columbia Pictures
- Release date: November 30, 1940
- Running time: 58 minutes
- Country: United States
- Language: English

Ellery Queen, Master Detective is a 1940 American mystery film directed by Kurt Neumann and written by Eric Taylor. The film stars Ralph Bellamy, Margaret Lindsay, Charley Grapewin, James Burke, Michael Whalen and Marsha Hunt. The film was released on November 30, 1940, by Columbia Pictures.

== Plot ==
John Braun, healthy and athletic model for his fitness enterprise, gets fatally ill and on the next day changes his will, leaving everything to his company. John locks himself up in his study, but Nikki goes to talk with him. She waits in the anteroom, but finds herself locked in and when they finally manage to open the door, they find Braun sitting at his desk, stabbed, and both the will and the murder weapon missing.

== Cast ==
- Ralph Bellamy as Ellery Queen
- Margaret Lindsay as Nikki Porter
- Charley Grapewin as Inspector Queen
- James Burke as Sergeant Velie
- Michael Whalen as Dr. James Rogers
- Marsha Hunt as Barbara Braun
- Fred Niblo as John Braun
- Charles Lane as Dr. Prouty
- Ann Shoemaker as Lydia Braun
- Marion Martin as Cornelia
- Douglas Fowley as Rocky Taylor
- Morgan Wallace as Zachary
- Byron Foulger as Amos
- Katherine DeMille as Valerie Norris
