= A Close Call for Ellery Queen =

1942 film by James P. Hogan

- Theatrical release poster
- Directed by: James P. Hogan
- Screenplay by: Eric Taylor; Gertrude Purcell
- Based on: The Dragon's Teeth: A Problem in Deduction by Ellery Queen
- Produced by: Larry Darmour
- Starring: William Gargan; Margaret Lindsay; Charley Grapewin; Ralph Morgan; Kay Linaker; Edward Norris; James Burke
- Cinematography: James S. Brown Jr.
- Edited by: Dwight Caldwell
- Music by: Lee Zahler
- Production company: Larry Darmour Productions
- Distributed by: Columbia Pictures
- Release date: January 29, 1942
- Running time: 65 minutes
- Country: United States
- Language: English

A Close Call for Ellery Queen is a 1942 American mystery film directed by James P. Hogan and written by Eric Taylor and Gertrude Purcell. It is based on the 1939 novel The Dragon's Teeth: A Problem in Deduction by Ellery Queen. The film stars William Gargan, Margaret Lindsay, Charley Grapewin, Ralph Morgan, Kay Linaker, Edward Norris and James Burke. The film was released on January 29, 1942, by Columbia Pictures.

== Cast ==
- William Gargan as Ellery Queen
- Margaret Lindsay as Nikki Porter
- Charley Grapewin as Inspector Queen
- Ralph Morgan as Alan Rogers
- Kay Linaker as Margo Rogers
- Edward Norris as Stewart Cole
- James Burke as Sergeant Velle
- Addison Richards as Lester Young
- Charles Judels as Corday
- Andrew Tombes as Bates
- Claire Du Brey as Deborah
- Micheline Cheirel as Marie Dubois
- Ben Welden as Watchman
- Milton Parsons as Butler
