= Reckless Roads =

1935 American drama film

- Directed by: Burt P. Lynwood
- Written by: Betty Burbridge; L.S. Heifetz; H.A. Carlisle
- Produced by: Larry Darmour
- Starring: Judith Allen; Regis Toomey; Lloyd Hughes
- Cinematography: James S. Brown Jr.
- Edited by: Dwight Caldwell
- Music by: Lee Zahler
- Production company: Larry Darmour Productions
- Distributed by: Majestic Pictures
- Release date: July 30, 1935
- Running time: 60 minutes
- Country: United States
- Language: English

Reckless Roads is a 1935 American drama film directed by Burt P. Lynwood and starring Judith Allen, Regis Toomey and Lloyd Hughes.

== Cast ==
- Judith Allen as Edith Adams
- Regis Toomey as Speed Demming
- Lloyd Hughes as Fred Truslow
- Ben Alexander as Wade Adams
- Louise Carter as Mrs. Adams
- Gilbert Emery as Amos Truslow
- Matthew Betz
- Dorothea Wolbert
- Kit Guard
- Jock Hutton

== Reception ==
Variety gave a negative review of the film, citing "a bad writing job, feeble dialog, sloppy direction and acting." They wrote that "Regis Toomey manages to make something of his reporter role and Judith Allen struggles hard enough with her inane lines."

== Bibliography ==
- Palmer, Scott. British Film Actors' Credits, 1895-1987. McFarland, 1988.
