= James S. Brown Jr. =

American cinematographer (1892–1949)

- Born: March 16, 1892; Montclair, New Jersey, U.S.
- Died: June 1, 1949 (aged 57); Los Angeles, California, U.S.
- Occupation: Cinematographer
- Years active: 1924–1949

James S. Brown Jr. (March 16, 1892 – June 1, 1949) was an American cinematographer. He was a prolific worker with around 150 credits during his career spent generally with lower-budget outfits such as Columbia Pictures, Mayfair Pictures and Monogram Pictures.

== Career ==
Brown is listed in the 1937–38 International Motion Picture Almanac as a cameraman, with 1936 credits including Shadows of the Orient for Empire Pictures, and Heroes of the Range, The Fugitive Sheriff and North of Nome for Columbia Pictures, followed by Trouble in Morocco (1937). One database biography describes him as a prolific, long-time Columbia cinematographer who began his career with Edison in the 1910s

At Columbia in the early 1940s, Brown photographed several of the studio's serials, including Captain Midnight (1942) and the first of the studio's two Batman serials (1943) He also shot Columbia's Ellery Queen mystery series, including Ellery Queen, Master Detective (1940), Ellery Queen's Penthouse Mystery and Ellery Queen and the Murder Ring (both 1941), and A Close Call for Ellery Queen and A Desperate Chance for Ellery Queen (both 1942).

== Filmography ==
- Some Pun'kins (1925)
- The College Boob (1926)
- Fangs of Justice (1926)
- Flying High (1926)
- The Winning Wallop (1926)
- Stop, Look and Listen (1926)
- Daniel Boone Thru the Wilderness (1926)
- With Davy Crockett at the Fall of the Alamo (1926)
- Sitting Bull at the Spirit Lake Massacre (1927)
- Avenging Fangs (1927)
- Spuds (1927)
- One Chance in a Million (1927)
- The Down Grade (1927)
- Catch-As-Catch-Can (1927)
- The Snarl of Hate (1927)
- The Mystery Train (1931)
- Sea Devils (1931)
- Defenders of the Law (1931)
- Air Eagles (1931)
- Klondike (1932)
- The Vanishing Frontier (1932)
- The Big Bluff (1933)
- Her Forgotten Past (1933)
- Cheating Blondes (1933)
- The Big Bluff (1933)
- Secret Sinners (1933)
- What's Your Racket? (1934)
- Badge of Honor (1934)
- The Fighting Rookie (1934)
- Night Alarm (1934)
- Dancing Man (1934)
- She Had to Choose (1934)
- The Scarlet Letter (1934)
- Back Page (1934)
- Arizona Bad Man (1935)
- Shadows of the Orient (1935)
- Manhattan Butterfly (1935)
- Calling All Cars (1935)
- Reckless Roads (1935)
- Get That Man (1935)
- Murder by Television (1935)
- Western Frontier (1935)
- Avenging Waters (1936)
- North of Nome (1936)
- Heroes of the Range (1936)
- Rio Grande Ranger (1936)
- The Unknown Ranger (1936)
- The Fugitive Sheriff (1936)
- The Rangers Step In (1937)
- Under Suspicion (1937)
- Law of the Ranger (1937)
- Trouble in Morocco (1937)
- Ranger Courage (1937)
- Rich Relations (1937)
- Outlaws of the Orient (1937)
- Roaring Timber (1937)
- Trapped by G-Men (1937)
- Stagecoach Days (1938)
- Crime Takes a Holiday (1938)
- Reformatory (1938)
- Rolling Caravans (1938)
- In Early Arizona (1938)
- Flight Into Nowhere (1938)
- The Strange Case of Dr. Meade (1938)
- Making the Headlines (1938)
- Phantom Gold (1938)
- Crashing Through Danger (1938)
- Pioneer Trail (1938)
- Frontiers of '49 (1939)
- Fugitive at Large (1939)
- Lone Star Pioneers (1939)
- Hidden Power (1939)
- Whispering Enemies (1939)
- Trapped in the Sky (1939)
- The Law Comes to Texas (1939)
- Ellery Queen, Master Detective (1940)
- The Great Plane Robbery (1940)
- Fugitive from a Prison Camp (1940)
- Deadwood Dick (1940)
- The Shadow (1940)
- Passport to Alcatraz (1940)
- Outside the Three-Mile Limit (1940)
- The Green Archer (1940)
- Terry and the Pirates (1940)
- The Spider Returns (1941)
- Holt of the Secret Service (1941)
- Ellery Queen and the Murder Ring (1941)
- Ellery Queen and the Perfect Crime (1941)
- Ellery Queen's Penthouse Mystery (1941)
- The Great Swindle (1941)
- The Iron Claw (1941)
- White Eagle (1941)
- The Valley of Vanishing Men (1942)
- A Close Call for Ellery Queen (1942)
- Enemy Agents Meet Ellery Queen (1942)
- Captain Midnight (1942)
- Perils of the Royal Mounted (1942)
- The Secret Code (1942)
- A Desperate Chance for Ellery Queen (1942)
- Land of Hunted Men (1943)
- Crime Doctor (1943)
- Harvest Melody (1943)
- Batman (1943)
- The Phantom (1943)
- No Place for a Lady (1943)
- The Crime Doctor's Strangest Case (1943)
- Shadows in the Night (1944)
- The Desert Hawk (1944)
- The Whistler (1944)
- The Man Who Walked Alone (1945)
- The Great Flamarion (1945)
- The Phantom of 42nd Street (1945)
- Crime, Inc. (1945)
- The Kid Sister (1945)
- The Missing Corpse (1945)
- Dangerous Intruder (1945)
- Shadows on the Range (1946)
- Devil Bat's Daughter (1946)
- The Trap (1946)
- Ginger (1946)
- Trail to Mexico (1946)
- Strangler of the Swamp (1946)
- Mr. Hex (1946)
- Renegade Girl (1946)
- Killer at Large (1947)
- Dragnet (1947)
- The Prairie (1947)
- Hard Boiled Mahoney (1947)
- The Gas House Kids in Hollywood (1947)
- Ridin' Down the Trail (1947)
- The Hat Box Mystery (1947)
- Stage to Mesa City (1947)
- Frontier Revenge (1948)
- Deadline (1948)
- Tornado Range (1948)
- The Counterfeiters (1948)
- Zamba (1949)

== Bibliography ==
- Blottner, Gene. Columbia Pictures Movie Series, 1926-1955: The Harry Cohn Years. McFarland, 2011.
- Darby, William. Masters of Lens and Light: A Checklist of Major Cinematographers and Their Feature Films. Scarecrow Press, 1991.
