= Western Frontier (film) =

1935 film by Albert Herman

- Theatrical release poster
- Directed by: Albert Herman
- Screenplay by: Nate Gatzert
- Story by: Ken Maynard
- Produced by: Larry Darmour
- Starring: Ken Maynard; Lucile Browne; Nora Lane; Robert 'Buzz' Henry; Frank Yaconelli; Otis Harlan
- Cinematography: James S. Brown Jr. Herbert Kirkpatrick
- Edited by: Dwight Caldwell
- Production company: Columbia Pictures
- Distributed by: Columbia Pictures
- Release date: August 7, 1935
- Running time: 59 minutes
- Country: United States
- Language: English

Western Frontier is a 1935 American Western film directed by Albert Herman and written by Nate Gatzert. The film stars Ken Maynard, Lucile Browne, Nora Lane, Robert 'Buzz' Henry, Frank Yaconelli and Otis Harlan. The film was released on August 7, 1935, by Columbia Pictures.

== Cast ==
- Ken Maynard as Ken Masters
- Lucile Browne as Mary Harper
- Nora Lane as Gail Masters / Goldie
- Robert 'Buzz' Henry as Pee Wee Harper
- Frank Yaconelli as Hawhaw
- Otis Harlan as Cookie
- Harold Goodwin as Morgan
- Frank Hagney as Link
- Gordon Griffith as Steve
- James A. Marcus as Marshal Bat Mannington
- William Gould as Jed
