= Law of the Ranger =

1937 film by Spencer Gordon Bennet

- Theatrical release poster
- Directed by: Spencer Gordon Bennet
- Screenplay by: Nate Gatzert
- Story by: Jesse Duffy; Joseph Levering
- Produced by: Larry Darmour
- Starring: Robert Allen; Elaine Shepard; John Merton; Wally Wales; Lafe McKee; Tom London
- Cinematography: James S. Brown Jr.
- Edited by: Dwight Caldwell
- Production company: Larry Darmour Productions
- Distributed by: Columbia Pictures
- Release date: May 11, 1937
- Running time: 58 minutes
- Country: United States
- Language: English

Law of the Ranger is a 1937 American Western film directed by Spencer Gordon Bennet and written by Nate Gatzert. The film stars Robert Allen, Elaine Shepard, John Merton, Wally Wales, Lafe McKee and Tom London. The film was released on May 11, 1937, by Columbia Pictures.

== Cast ==
- Robert Allen as Bob Allen
- Elaine Shepard as Evelyn Polk
- John Merton as Bill Nash
- Wally Wales as Wally Hood
- Lafe McKee as Mr. Polk
- Tom London as Pete
- Slim Whitaker as Steve
- Ernie Adams as Zeke
- Lane Chandler as Cal Williams
