= Hidden Power =

- Directed by: Lewis D. Collins
- Written by: Charles Bennett; Gordon Rigby
- Produced by: Larry Darmour
- Starring: Jack Holt; Gertrude Michael; Dickie Moore
- Cinematography: James S. Brown Jr.
- Edited by: Dwight Caldwell
- Music by: Lee Zahler
- Production company: Larry Darmour Productions
- Distributed by: Columbia Pictures
- Release date: September 7, 1939
- Running time: 60 minutes
- Country: United States
- Language: English

Hidden Power is a 1939 American drama film directed by Lewis D. Collins and starring Jack Holt, Gertrude Michael, Dickie Moore, and William B. Davidson.

== Cast ==
- Jack Holt as Dr. Garfield
- Gertrude Michael as Virginia Garfield
- Dickie Moore as Stevie Garfield
- William B. Davidson as Foster
- Henry Kolker as Weston
- Helen Brown as Mrs. Morley
- Marilyn Knowlden as Imogene
- Harry Hayden as Downey
- Regis Toomey as Mayton
- Holmes Herbert as Dr. Morley
- Christian Rub as Doctor
