= The Law Comes to Texas =

1939 film by Joseph Levering

- Directed by: Joseph Levering
- Screenplay by: Nate Gatzert
- Produced by: Larry Darmour
- Starring: Wild Bill Elliott; Veda Ann Borg; Bud Osborne; Slim Whitaker; Leon Beaumon; Paul Everton
- Cinematography: James S. Brown Jr.
- Edited by: Dwight Caldwell
- Music by: Lee Zahler
- Production company: Larry Darmour Productions
- Distributed by: Columbia Pictures
- Release date: April 16, 1939
- Running time: 61 minutes
- Country: United States
- Language: English

The Law Comes to Texas is a 1939 American Western film directed by Joseph Levering and written by Nate Gatzert. The film stars Wild Bill Elliott, Veda Ann Borg, Bud Osborne, Slim Whitaker, Leon Beaumon and Paul Everton. The film was released on April 16, 1939, by Columbia Pictures.

== Plot ==
The Governor of Texas sends attorney John Haynes to investigate a gang of outlaws using a law that prevents sheriffs from acting outside their county to escape after each raid. John disguises himself as an outlaw and joins the gang and has a plan to take them down.

== Cast ==
- Wild Bill Elliott as John Haynes
- Veda Ann Borg as Dora Lewis
- Bud Osborne as Judge Jim Dean
- Slim Whitaker as Barney Dalton
- Leon Beaumon as Jeff
- Paul Everton as Governor
- Charles King as Kaintuck
