= A Desperate Chance for Ellery Queen =

1942 film by James P. Hogan

- Theatrical release poster
- Directed by: James P. Hogan
- Screenplay by: Eric Taylor
- Based on: A Good Samaritan by Ellery Queen
- Produced by: Larry Darmour
- Starring: William Gargan; Margaret Lindsay; Charley Grapewin; John Litel; Lilian Bond; James Burke
- Cinematography: James S. Brown Jr.
- Edited by: Dwight Caldwell
- Music by: Lee Zahler
- Production company: Larry Darmour Productions
- Distributed by: Columbia Pictures
- Release date: May 7, 1942
- Running time: 70 minutes
- Country: United States
- Language: English

A Desperate Chance for Ellery Queen is a 1942 American mystery film directed by James P. Hogan and written by Eric Taylor. It is based on the 1940 play A Good Samaritan by Ellery Queen. The film stars William Gargan, Margaret Lindsay, Charley Grapewin, John Litel, Lilian Bond and James Burke. The film was released on May 7, 1942, by Columbia Pictures.

== Plot ==
While on a business trip to California, Ellery and Nikki get involved with a man who was presumed dead, but is now suspected in embezzlement, money laundering, and murder. They manage to keep one step ahead of both the crooks and the law.

== Cast ==
- William Gargan as Ellery Queen
- Margaret Lindsay as Nikki Porter
- Charley Grapewin as Inspector Queen
- John Litel as Norman Hadley
- Lilian Bond as Adele Belden
- James Burke as Sergeant Velie
- Jack La Rue as Tommy Gould
- Morgan Conway as Ray Stafford
- Noel Madison as George Belden
- Frank M. Thomas as Capt. H.T. Daley
- Charlotte Wynters as Mrs. Irene Evington Hadley
