= Crime Takes a Holiday =

1938 film directed by Lewis D. Collins

- Theatrical release poster
- Directed by: Lewis D. Collins
- Screenplay by: Jefferson Parker; Henry Altimus; Charles Logue
- Story by: Henry Altimus
- Produced by: Larry Darmour
- Starring: Jack Holt; Marcia Ralston; Russell Hopton; Douglass Dumbrille; Arthur Hohl; Thomas E. Jackson; John Wray
- Cinematography: James S. Brown Jr.
- Edited by: Dwight Caldwell
- Production company: Larry Darmour Productions
- Distributed by: Columbia Pictures
- Release date: October 5, 1938
- Running time: 59 minutes
- Country: United States
- Language: English

Crime Takes a Holiday is a 1938 American crime film directed by Lewis D. Collins and written by Jefferson Parker, Henry Altimus and Charles Logue. The film stars Jack Holt, Marcia Ralston, Russell Hopton, Douglass Dumbrille, Arthur Hohl, Thomas E. Jackson and John Wray. The film was released on October 5, 1938, by Columbia Pictures.

== Plot ==
A policeman is murdered and District Attorney Walter Forbes gets an ex-con to take the blame in order for the real culprit to be more at ease. Forbes calls the real killer, but wires to conversation to broadcast over the radio.

== Cast ==
- Jack Holt as Walter Forbes
- Marcia Ralston as Margaret 'Peggy' Stone
- Russell Hopton as Jerry Clayton
- Douglass Dumbrille as J.J. Grant
- Arthur Hohl as Joe Whitehead
- Thomas E. Jackson as Brennan
- John Wray as Howell
- William Pawley as Spike
- Paul Fix as Louie
- Harry Woods as Stoddard
- Joseph Crehan as Gov. Bill Allen
