= Rolling Caravans =

1938 film by Joseph Levering

- Theatrical release poster
- Directed by: Joseph Levering
- Screenplay by: Nate Gatzert
- Produced by: Larry Darmour
- Starring: Jack Luden; Eleanor Stewart; Harry Woods; Lafe McKee; Buzz Barton; Slim Whitaker
- Cinematography: James S. Brown Jr.
- Edited by: Dwight Caldwell
- Production company: Columbia Pictures
- Distributed by: Columbia Pictures
- Release date: March 7, 1938
- Running time: 55 minutes
- Country: United States
- Language: English

Rolling Caravans is a 1938 American Western film directed by Joseph Levering and written by Nate Gatzert. The film stars Jack Luden, Eleanor Stewart, Harry Woods, Lafe McKee, Buzz Barton and Slim Whitaker. The film was released on March 7, 1938, by Columbia Pictures.

== Cast ==
- Jack Luden as Breezy
- Eleanor Stewart as Alice Rankin
- Harry Woods as Thad Dalton
- Lafe McKee as Henry Rankin
- Buzz Barton as Jim Rankin
- Slim Whitaker as Boots
- Bud Osborne as Groucher
- Cactus Mack as Happy
- Tuffy as Tuffy
