= In Early Arizona =

1938 film by Joseph Levering

- Theatrical release poster
- Directed by: Joseph Levering
- Screenplay by: Nate Gatzert
- Produced by: Larry Darmour
- Starring: Wild Bill Elliott; Dorothy Gulliver; Harry Woods; Jack Ingram; Franklyn Farnum; Frank Ellis
- Cinematography: James S. Brown Jr.
- Edited by: Dwight Caldwell
- Production company: Larry Darmour Productions
- Distributed by: Columbia Pictures
- Release date: November 2, 1938
- Running time: 53 minutes
- Country: United States
- Language: English

In Early Arizona is a 1938 American Western film directed by Joseph Levering and written by Nate Gatzert. The film stars Wild Bill Elliott, Dorothy Gulliver, Harry Woods, Jack Ingram, Franklyn Farnum and Frank Ellis. The film was released on November 2, 1938, by Columbia Pictures.

== Plot ==
Marshal Jeff sends his friend Whit Gordon to help Tombstone, a city where Bull and his gang rule with help of the Sheriff and the Judge.

== Cast ==
- Wild Bill Elliott as Whit Gordon
- Dorothy Gulliver as Alice Weldon
- Harry Woods as Bull
- Jack Ingram as Marshal Jeff Bowers
- Franklyn Farnum as Spike
- Frank Ellis as Ben
- Art Davis as Art
- Charles King as Kaintuck
- Ed Cassidy as Tom Weldon
- Slim Whitaker as Sheriff E.W. Wilson
