= Shadows of the Orient =

- Directed by: Burt P. Lynwood
- Written by: Louis E. Heifetz (story); Charles F. Royal (adaptation and screenplay)
- Produced by: Larry Darmour (producer)
- Starring: See below
- Cinematography: James S. Brown Jr.
- Edited by: Dwight Caldwell
- Distributed by: Majestic Pictures; Monogram Pictures
- Release date: July 6, 1935
- Running time: 69 minutes
- Country: United States
- Language: English

Shadows of the Orient is a 1935 American crime drama film directed by Burt P. Lynwood.

== Plot ==
Law enforcement officers try to track down the head of a smuggling ring operating out of the 'shadows' of Chinatown.

== Cast ==
- Esther Ralston as Viola Avery
- Regis Toomey as Inspector Bob Baxter
- J. Farrell MacDonald as Inspector Sullivan
- Oscar Apfel as Judge Avery
- Sidney Blackmer as King Moss
- Eddie Fetherston as James 'Flash' Dawson
- Kit Guard as Spud Nolan
- James B. Leong as Ching Chu

== Critical reception ==
Lionel Collier, writing for the British magazine, Picturegoer, gave the film a one-star review and described it as, "An ingenious quick-action melodrama which does not pretend to any plausibility but keeps going at a hectic pace with aerial thrills, romance and villainy."
