= Lawless Riders =

1935 film by Spencer Gordon Bennet

- Theatrical release poster
- Directed by: Spencer Gordon Bennet
- Screenplay by: Nate Gatzert
- Produced by: Larry Darmour
- Starring: Ken Maynard; Geneva Mitchell; Harry Woods; Frank Yaconelli; Wally Wales; Slim Whitaker
- Cinematography: Herbert Kirkpatrick
- Edited by: Dwight Caldwell
- Production company: Larry Darmour Productions
- Distributed by: Columbia Pictures
- Release date: December 6, 1935
- Running time: 58 minutes
- Country: United States
- Language: English

Lawless Riders is a 1935 American Western film directed by Spencer Gordon Bennet and written by Nate Gatzert. The film stars Ken Maynard, Geneva Mitchell, Harry Woods, Frank Yaconelli, Wally Wales and Slim Whitaker. The film was released on December 6, 1935, by Columbia Pictures.

== Cast ==
- Ken Maynard as Ken Manley
- Geneva Mitchell as Edith Adams
- Harry Woods as Bart
- Frank Yaconelli as Pedro
- Wally Wales as Carl
- Slim Whitaker as Prod
- Frank Ellis as Twister
- Jack Rockwell as Sheriff
