= Outside the Three-Mile Limit =

- Theatrical release poster
- Directed by: Lewis D. Collins
- Screenplay by: Albert DeMond
- Story by: Albert DeMond; Eric Taylor
- Produced by: Larry Darmour
- Starring: Jack Holt; Harry Carey; Sig Ruman; Eduardo Ciannelli; Donald Briggs; Irene Ware
- Cinematography: James S. Brown Jr.
- Edited by: Dwight Caldwell
- Production company: Larry Darmour Productions
- Distributed by: Columbia Pictures
- Release date: March 7, 1940
- Running time: 64 minutes
- Country: United States
- Language: English

Outside the Three-Mile Limit is a 1940 American crime film directed by Lewis D. Collins and written by Albert DeMond. The film stars Jack Holt, Harry Carey, Sig Ruman, Eduardo Ciannelli, Donald Briggs and Irene Ware. The film was released on March 7, 1940, by Columbia Pictures.

== Cast ==
- Jack Holt as Conway
- Harry Carey as Captain Bailey
- Sig Ruman as Van Cleve
- Eduardo Ciannelli as Dave Reeves
- Donald Briggs as Jimmy Rothaker
- Irene Ware as Dorothy Kenney
- Dick Purcell as Melvin Pierce
- Ben Welden as Lefty Shores
- Paul Fix as Bill Swanson
- George J. Lewis as Ed Morrow
