= Deadwood Dick (serial) =

1940 film by James W. Horne

- Theatrical release poster
- Directed by: James W. Horne
- Screenplay by: Wyndham Gittens; Morgan Cox (as Morgan B. Cox); George H. Plympton (as George Plympton); John Cutting
- Produced by: Larry Darmour
- Starring: Don Douglas; Lorna Gray
- Cinematography: James S. Brown Jr.
- Edited by: Dwight Caldwell; Earl Turner
- Production company: Columbia Pictures
- Distributed by: Columbia Pictures
- Release date: July 19, 1940
- Running time: 285 minutes (15 episodes)
- Country: United States
- Language: English

Deadwood Dick is a 1940 American Western Serial film directed by James W. Horne and starring Don Douglas and Lorna Gray. The character of Deadwood Dick is for the most part another version of "Zorro". Characters also include Wild Bill Hickok and Calamity Jane.

== Plot ==
Deadwood Dick, a masked and mysterious hero, is in reality Dick Stanley, editor of the Dakota Pioneer Press and a leading member of Statehood For Dakota. He is on the trail of a masked villain known as the Skull, who leads a violent, renegade band infamous for its violence against the Deadwood residents' wishes for a statehood status. Our hero soon discovers that the Skull terrorizes the town to prevent statehood from being achieved in order to build his own empire in the vast territory. However, Dick suspects that one of his fellow committeemen might be responsible for the string of criminal acts. It takes him 15 episodes and about 40 choreographed slugfests to finally uncover the truth and defeat the Skull.

== Cast ==
- Don Douglas as Dick Stanley - aka Deadwood Dick (credited as Don Douglas)
- Lorna Gray as Anne Butler
- Harry Harvey as Dave Miller
- Marin Sais as Calamity Jane
- Lane Chandler as Wild Bill Hickok [Ch.1]
- Jack Ingram as Buzz Ricketts - Chief Henchman
- Charles King as Tex - Henchman [Chs. 1-4, 6-9]
- Ed Cassidy as Tennison Drew - Committeeman
- Robert Fiske as Ashton - Committeeman
- Lee Shumway as Bentley - Committeeman

== Chapter titles ==
1. A Wild West Empire
2. Who is the Skull?
3. Pirates of the Plains
4. The Skull Baits a Trap
5. Win, Lose or Draw
6. Buried Alive
7. The Chariot of Doom
8. The Secret of Number Ten
9. The Fatal Warning
10. Framed for Murder
11. The Bucket of Death
12. A Race Against Time
13. The Arsenal of Revolt
14. Holding the Fort
15. The Deadwood Express

== See also ==
- List of American films of 1940
