= Rio Grande Ranger =

1936 film by Spencer Gordon Bennet

- Directed by: Spencer Gordon Bennet
- Written by: Jacques Jaccard; Celia Jaccard; Nate Gatzert
- Produced by: Larry Darmour
- Starring: Robert Allen; Iris Meredith; Paul Sutton
- Cinematography: James S. Brown Jr.
- Edited by: Dwight Caldwell
- Music by: Lee Zahler
- Production company: Columbia Pictures
- Distributed by: Columbia Pictures
- Release date: December 11, 1936
- Running time: 54 minutes
- Country: United States
- Language: English

Rio Grande Ranger is a 1936 American Western film directed by Spencer Gordon Bennet and starring Robert Allen, Iris Meredith and Paul Sutton.

== Cast ==
- Robert Allen as Bob Allen aka 'Smoke'
- Iris Meredith as Sandra Cullen
- Paul Sutton as Jim Sayres
- Hal Taliaferro as Ranger Hal Garrick
- Robert 'Buzz' Henry as Buzzy Cullen
- John Elliott as John Cullen
- Tom London as Henchman Sneed
- Slim Whitaker as Henchman Jack
- Jack Rockwell as Ranger Captain Winkler
