= Making the Headlines =

1938 film by Lewis D. Collins

- Directed by: Lewis D. Collins
- Screenplay by: Jefferson Parker; Harold J. Green
- Story by: Harold J. Green
- Produced by: Larry Darmour
- Starring: Jack Holt
- Cinematography: James S. Brown Jr.
- Edited by: Dwight Caldwell
- Color process: Black and white
- Production company: Larry Darmour Productions
- Distributed by: Columbia Pictures
- Release date: April 1, 1938
- Running time: 66 minutes
- Country: United States
- Language: English

Making the Headlines is a 1938 American crime film directed by Lewis D. Collins and starring Jack Holt.

== Cast ==
- Jack Holt as Lt. Lewis Nagel
- Beverly Roberts as Jeane Sanford
- Craig Reynolds as Steve Withers
- Marjorie Gateson as Muffin Wilder
- Dorothy Appleby as Claire Sanford
- Gilbert Emery as Edmund Sanford
- Tom Kennedy as Sgt. Handley
- Corbet Morris as Ronald Sanford
- Sheila Bromley as Grace Sanford
- John Wray as Herbert Sanford

== See also ==
- List of American films of 1938
