= Holt of the Secret Service =

1941 film by James W. Horne

- Directed by: James W. Horne
- Screenplay by: Basil Dickey; George H. Plympton (as George Plympton); Wyndham Gittens
- Produced by: Larry Darmour
- Starring: Jack Holt; Evelyn Brent; Tristram Coffin; C. Montague Shaw
- Narrated by: Knox Manning
- Cinematography: James S. Brown Jr.
- Edited by: Dwight Caldwell; Earl Turner
- Music by: Lee Zahler
- Production company: Columbia Pictures
- Distributed by: Columbia Pictures
- Release date: November 21, 1941
- Running time: 278 minutes (15 episodes)
- Country: United States
- Language: English

Holt of the Secret Service, Part 1: Chaotic Creek

Holt of the Secret Service (1941) was the 16th serial released by Columbia Pictures.

== Plot ==
A murderous gang of counterfeiters has kidnapped John Severn (played by Ray Parsons), the U.S. government's best engraver. He is forced to engrave a set of counterfeit plates, to print phony money that is virtually undetectable from genuine currency. The United States Secret Service sends its toughest agent, Jack Holt (played by himself), and his partner Kay Drew (Evelyn Brent), after the gang. Holt poses as escaped tough guy Nick Farrell (misspelled "Farrel" in the cast listing but spelled correctly in the story synopses). Masquerading as the bickering, tough-talking Mr. and Mrs. Farrell, Holt and Drew manage to infiltrate the ruthless gang of thugs. Holt locates Severn and instructs him to keep working but as slowly as possible, to give Holt time to find the head of the crime ring. Holt takes the set of counterfeit plates in hand, and much of the action has Holt keeping the plates away from the crooks. The scenes shift from the gang's hideout in a lost canyon to a gambling ship on the high seas, to a small island country where the gang hopes to escape U.S. extradition.

The head of the ring is gambler Lucky Arnold (John Ward), who takes precautions to escape detection. He hides behind the facade of one of his loyal henchmen, Quist (Ted Adams), to shield himself from the Secret Service, and lets another one of his men, Ed Valden (Tristram Coffin), do most of his dirty work. The island nation has its own self-appointed dictator (Stanley Blystone), who is also trying to rub out our hero. During the 15 episodes, Holt endures numerous brushes with death, emerging from all of them virtually unscathed. Holt is so tough that, when he faces a firing squad and is asked if he wants a blindfold, he murmurs, "Forget it. This is the only thing in life I haven't seen!"

== Cast ==
- Jack Holt as Jack Holt / Nick Farrell
- Evelyn Brent as Kay Drew, Agent R49
- C. Montague Shaw as Chief John W. Malloy (as Montague Shaw)
- Tristram Coffin as Ed Valden [Chs. 1-10]
- John Ward as Lucky Arnold
- Ted Adams as Quist
- Joe McGuinn as "Crimp" Evans
- Edward Hearn as Agent Jim Layton
- Ray Parsons as John Severn, engraver [Chs. 1-4]
- Jack Cheatham as Agent Frank [Chs. 3–5, 8–9, 15]

== Chapter titles ==
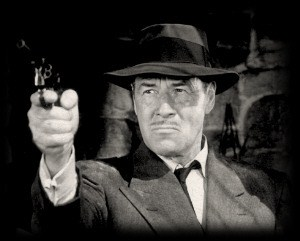
Jack Holt in scene from the serial

1. Chaotic Creek
2. Ramparts of Revenge
3. Illicit Wealth
4. Menaced by Fate
5. Exits to Terror
6. Deadly Doom
7. Out of the Past
8. Escape to Peril
9. Sealed in Silence
10. Named to Die
11. Ominous Warnings
12. The Stolen Signal
13. Prison of Jeopardy
14. Afire Afloat
15. Yielded Hostage

== Production ==
Jack Holt, Columbia's star of longest standing, had argued with studio head Harry Cohn. Cohn demoted him from working in feature films to this lowbrow serial adventure. Actually, it wasn't so much of a demotion because he was still working with the same feature-film crew, under producer Larry Darmour. Holt had misgivings about working in a serial, but was convinced by co-star Evelyn Brent to see it through. She knew that Darmour was making the serial for an adult audience, by making it thrilling and logical but never impossible. Darmour was also careful to cast the film with character actors who were not familiar from Darmour's serials.

== Reception ==
Columbia marketed this as a special attraction. The studio dispatched sales executive M. J. Weisfeldt to tour Columbia exchanges across America with sample chapters of Holt of the Secret Service, to stimulate interest among exhibitors in each region. Trade journal The Exhibitor screened the first two chapters and called this serial "a good one from the standpoints of suspense, action, and production. There's literally something doing every minute of the first two chapters. This lacks the topical interest of some recent serials, employing a conventional cops-and-robbers theme." Motion Picture Daily also reviewed the opening installments: "This is a story which is likely to have considerable appeal both to adults and children, as it is chockfull of action right through." Variety was surprised by the casting of Evelyn Brent, "who in no sense of the imagination could pass as the type one would want to protect, or would have to worry about taking care of herself. Formula demands that the girl be demure, and Miss Brent hardly qualifies for that classification."

Holt of the Secret Service turned out to be exceptionally successful in theaters, with the Jack Holt name attracting fans of action and adventure. By the time it was released, Holt had left the studio behind and there were no sequels.

After the serial's copyright lapsed in 1969, Holt of the Secret Service became one of the very few Columbia cliffhangers available for modern appraisal. Authors and critics marveled at the film's breakneck pace and hectic, six-against-one fight scenes as staged by former comedy director James W. Horne. Thus Holt of the Secret Service became the poster child for Columbia serials until the advent of home video, when more of the Columbia serials went into circulation.

== Sources ==
- Cinefania.com
- eMoviePoster.com
