= Lone Star Pioneers =

1939 film by Joseph Levering

- Later release poster by Astor Pictures
- Directed by: Joseph Levering
- Screenplay by: Nate Gatzert
- Produced by: Larry Darmour
- Starring: Wild Bill Elliott; Dorothy Gulliver; Lee Shumway; Slim Whitaker; Charles King; Jack Ingram
- Cinematography: James S. Brown Jr.
- Edited by: Dwight Caldwell
- Production company: Larry Darmour Productions
- Distributed by: Columbia Pictures
- Release date: March 16, 1939
- Running time: 54 minutes
- Country: United States
- Language: English

Lone Star Pioneers is a 1939 American Western film directed by Joseph Levering and written by Nate Gatzert. The film stars Wild Bill Elliott, Dorothy Gulliver, Lee Shumway, Slim Whitaker, Charles King and Jack Ingram. The film was released on March 16, 1939, by Columbia Pictures.

== Cast ==
- Wild Bill Elliott as Pat Barrett
- Dorothy Gulliver as Virginia Crittenden
- Lee Shumway as Bill Ruphy
- Slim Whitaker as Buck Bally
- Charles King as Pike
- Jack Ingram as John Coe
- Harry Harvey Sr. as Eph Brown
- Buzz Barton as Chuck
- Frank LaRue as Joe Cribben
