= The Shadow (serial) =

1940 film by James W. Horne

- Directed by: James W. Horne
- Screenplay by: Joseph F. Poland (as Joseph Poland); Ned Dandy; Joseph O'Donnell
- Based on: Walter B. Gibson (based upon stories in "The Shadow" magazine by)
- Produced by: Larry Darmour
- Starring: Victor Jory; Veda Ann Borg; Robert Fiske
- Cinematography: James S. Brown Jr.
- Edited by: Dwight Caldwell
- Music by: Lee Zahler
- Production company: Columbia Pictures
- Distributed by: Columbia Pictures
- Release date: January 5, 1940
- Running time: 285 minutes (15 episodes)
- Country: United States
- Language: English

The Shadow (1940) was the ninth serial released by Columbia Pictures. It was based upon the classic radio series and pulp magazine superhero character of the same name.

== Plot ==
The Shadow battles a villain known as The Black Tiger, who has the power to make himself invisible and is attempting domination of major financial and business concerns.

Victor Jory's Shadow is faithful to the radio character, especially the radio show's signature: the sinister chuckle of the invisible Shadow as he confronts the villain or his henchmen. Columbia, however, relied on fistfights, chases, and headlong action in its serials, and disliked the prospect of a 15-chapter adventure where the audience would not see much of the heroics, because the leading character was supposed to be invisible. By basing the serial more on the pulp fiction version and turning the mysterious Shadow into a flesh-and-blood figure, plainly visible wearing a black hat and black cloak, Columbia patterned the serial after its wildly successful serial, The Spider's Web (1938), itself based on a masked hero of pulp fiction. The Spider was the respectable Richard Wentworth, who terrorized the underworld as the mysterious Spider and infiltrated gangland under a third identity, small-time crook Blinky McQuade. Columbia copied the triple-role format for The Shadow, with the stalwart Lamont Cranston baffling criminals as The Shadow wearing a similar disguise and moving among them as their Asian confederate Lin Chang.

Chapter titles

The serial is split into fifteen episodes._{Source:}

1. The Doomed City
2. The Shadow Attacks
3. The Shadow's Peril
4. In the Tiger's Lair
5. Danger Above
6. The Shadow's Trap
7. Where Horror Waits
8. The Shadow Rides the Rails
9. The Devil in White
10. The Underground Trap
11. Chinatown Night
12. Murder by Remote Control
13. Wheels of Death
14. The Sealed Room
15. The Shadow's Net Closes

== Cast ==
- Victor Jory as Lamont Cranston - aka 'The Shadow'
- Veda Ann Borg as Margo Lane
- Roger Moore as Harry Vincent
- Robert Fiske as Stanford Marshall - aka 'The Black Tiger'
- J. Paul Jones as Mr. Turner
- Jack Ingram as Flint
- Chuck Hamilton as Roberts - Henchman
- Edward Peil Sr. as Inspector Joe Cardona
- Frank LaRue as Commissioner Ralph Weston
- Harry Tenbrook (uncredited) as Adams

== Release ==
=== Theatrical ===
The Shadow was released on 1 June 1940, Veda Ann Borg's 25th birthday.

=== Home media ===
In 1997, Columbia TriStar Home Video released the serial on VHS. In 2015, Mill Creek Entertainment released the serial on DVD under license from Sony Pictures Home Entertainment.

=== Critical reception ===
Opinion on the serial, especially as an adaptation on the pulp magazine source material, is mixed. Harmon and Glut are critical of the serial. Filming The Shadow in brightly lit environments undermines the mystery and menace of the character. The quality of the plotting is also brought into question for its lack of imagination and the fact that the hero appears to survive cliffhanger endings and other threats for no reason other than that he is the serial's masked hero. On the other hand, Cline praises the serial. The mystery of the pulp magazine was preserved by both the hero and villain being masked. This lent an ambiguity from the point of view of the other characters that also pervaded the source material, so "for the audience the result was perfectly compatible and a pure delight".

== See also ==
- List of film serials by year
- List of film serials by studio

Preceded by Overland with Kit Carson (1939)	Columbia Serial; The Shadow (1940)	Succeeded by Terry and the Pirates (1940)
