= Trouble in Morocco =

1937 film by Ernest B. Schoedsack

- Film poster
- Directed by: Ernest B. Schoedsack
- Screenplay by: Paul Franklin
- Story by: J.D. Newsom
- Produced by: Larry Darmour
- Starring: Jack Holt
- Cinematography: James S. Brown Jr.
- Edited by: Dwight Caldwell
- Production company: Larry Darmour Productions
- Distributed by: Columbia Pictures
- Release date: March 9, 1937
- Running time: 62 minutes
- Country: United States
- Language: English

Trouble in Morocco is a 1937 American adventure war film directed by Ernest B. Schoedsack and starring Jack Holt.

== Cast ==
- Jack Holt as Paul Cluett
- Mae Clarke as Linda Lawrence
- Paul Hurst as Tiger Malone
- C. Henry Gordon as Captain Nardant
- Harold Huber as Palmo
- Oscar Apfel as DeRouget
- Bradley Page as Branenok
- Victor Varconi as Kamaroff

== Plot ==
A newspaperman, Paul Cluett (Jack Holt), gets rival reporter Linda Lawrence (Mae Clark) to admit she is investigating a story in Morocco about illegal gun smuggling.
