= Ranger Courage =

1937 film by Spencer Gordon Bennet

- Directed by: Spencer Gordon Bennet
- Written by: Nate Gatzert
- Produced by: Larry Darmour
- Starring: Robert Allen
- Cinematography: James S. Brown Jr.
- Edited by: Dwight Caldwell
- Production company: Larry Darmour Productions
- Distributed by: Columbia Pictures
- Release date: January 10, 1937 (US)
- Running time: 58 minutes
- Country: United States
- Language: English

Ranger Courage is a 1937 American Western film directed by Spencer Gordon Bennet, the film stars Robert Allen, Martha Tibbetts, and Walter Miller.

== Cast ==
- Robert Allen as himself
- Martha Tibbetts as Alice
- Walter Miller as Bull
- Buzz Henry as Buzzy (credited as Buzzy Henry)
- Bud Osborne as Steve
- Robert Kortman as Toady (credited as Bob Kortman)
- Harry Strang as Snaky Joe
- William Gould as Harper (credited as Bill Gould)
- Horace Murphy
- Al Taylor
- Tex Palmer
