= Flight Into Nowhere =

1938 film directed by Lewis D. Collins

- Film poster in Spanish
- Directed by: Lewis D. Collins
- Screenplay by: Jefferson Parker; Gordon Rigby
- Story by: William Bloom; Clarence Jay Schneider
- Produced by: Larry Darmour
- Starring: Jack Holt; Jacqueline Wells; Dick Purcell
- Cinematography: James S. Brown Jr.
- Edited by: Dwight Caldwell
- Production company: Larry Darmour Productions
- Distributed by: Columbia Pictures
- Release date: April 18, 1938 (US)
- Running time: 65 minutes
- Country: United States
- Language: English

Flight Into Nowhere is a 1938 American adventure film directed by Lewis D. Collins, and produced by Larry Darmour for Columbia Pictures. The film stars Jack Holt, Jacqueline Wells and Dick Purcell. In the low-budget action film, the locale of South America jungles provides an exciting venue for "flyboy" Jack Holt, who is trying to establish a new route for an American airline. (Note: Reviewer Hal Erickson noted, "For a man who was reportedly deathly afraid of flying, Jack Holt certainly made more than his share of aviation pictures.")

== Plot ==
Headstrong pilot Bill Kellogg (Dick Purcell), despite landing safely, flew his airliner into a storm, and is fired. When, his boss at Trans Continental Airways, Jim Horne (Jack Holt), finds out Bill has secretly wed Joan Hammond (Jacqueline Wells), the daughter of the airline's owner, he relents and allows Bill to keep his job.

Fellow pilot, Ike Matthews (James Burke), is assigned to a proving flight over the western coast of the South American jungle to photograph potential landing fields. Bill is jealous of the publicity that the first flight will achieve and steals the aircraft to do the job himself. Flying in the same irresponsible way that made him dangerous, Bill pushes on, even when he is radioed that there is insufficient fuel on board.

In running out of gas, Bill chooses to crash-land near an Indian village. Only an Indian woman, L-ana (Karen Sorrell) helps Bill, as the villagers refuse to help him get back to civilization. Bill tries but is unable to get the radio working to send out an emergency message. Jim and Ike fly over the South American jungle, but a storm prevents them from spotting the village. They continue on to Rio Vista where the pilots meet Joan and for her sake, Jim organizes a rescue mission.

Led by natives, the rescuers finds a village holding Dr. Butler (Robert Fiske) captive. After a fierce battle, the doctor is freed but meanwhile, Bill, despondent over his fate, has taken on the native ways by marrying L-ana. Jim's expedition finally locates the tribe, but when he sees Bill's new life and native marriage, the two men cannot reconcile what has happened.

Knowing he is now able to get back home, Bill leaves without L-ana, but her brother (Fritz Leiber) is enraged at this affront, and kills him. After returning to Rio Vista, Jim tells Joan that Bill died in the accident, sacrificing himself to avoid landing in a field full of women and children. Bill is able to allow Joan to accept that her husband still loved her and died courageously.

== Cast ==
- Jack Holt as Jim Horne
- Jacqueline Wells as Joan Hammond
- Dick Purcell as Bill Kellogg
- James Burke as Ike Matthews
- Karen Sorrell as L-ana
- Fritz Leiber as Ti-ana
- Howard Hickman as Howard Hammond
- Robert Fiske as Dr. Butler
- Hector Sarno as Vincente
- Agostino Borgato as Cannibal

== Production ==
Principal photography on Flight Into Nowhere, took place from January 20 to February 8, 1938, at the United Airport, Burbank (Los Angeles).

The aircraft used in Flight Into Nowhere were:

- Douglas DC-3A-197 c/n 1929, NC16090
- Northrop Gamma 2D2 c/n 12, NC2111
- Lockheed Model 12A Super Electra c/n 1220, NC17376
- Douglas O-38B
- Ryan STA c/n 128, NC16039
- Fairchild 24C-8C c/n 2689, NC15346
- Boeing 247D c/n 1682, NC13301
- Beechcraft Model 17 Staggerwing NC1440
- Lockheed Vega c/n 11, NC7044

== Reception ==
Aviation film historian James H. Farmer in Celluloid Wings: The Impact of Movies on Aviation (1984) described Flight Into Nowhere as "fast-paced formula fare".
