= North of Nome (1936 film) =

1936 film by William Nigh

- Directed by: William Nigh
- Written by: Houston Branch; Albert DeMond
- Produced by: Larry Darmour
- Starring: Jack Holt; Evelyn Venable; Guinn 'Big Boy' Williams
- Cinematography: James S. Brown Jr.
- Edited by: Dwight Caldwell
- Music by: Lee Zahler
- Production company: Larry Darmour Productions
- Distributed by: Columbia Pictures
- Release date: November 14, 1936
- Running time: 60 minutes
- Country: United States
- Language: English

North of Nome is a 1936 American drama film directed by William Nigh and starring Jack Holt, Evelyn Venable and Guinn 'Big Boy' Williams.

== Cast ==
- Jack Holt as John Raglan
- Evelyn Venable as Camilla Bridle
- Guinn 'Big Boy' Williams as Haage
- John Miljan as Dawson
- Roger Imhof as Judge Bridle
- Dorothy Appleby as Ruby
- Paul Hurst as Carlson
- Frank McGlynn Sr. as U. S. Marshal
- Robert Gleckler as Bruno
- Ben Hendricks Jr. as Grail
- George Cleveland as Ship Captain
- Miki Morita as Sato
- Chief Blackhawk as Eskimo Hunter

== Bibliography ==
- Hardy, Phil, The Encyclopedia of Western Movies. Octopus, 1983.
