= Whispering Enemies =

1939 film

- Directed by: Lewis D. Collins
- Written by: Gordon Rigby; Tom Kilpatrick; John Rawlins; Harold Tarshis
- Produced by: Larry Darmour
- Starring: Jack Holt; Dolores Costello; Addison Richards
- Cinematography: James S. Brown Jr.
- Edited by: Dwight Caldwell
- Music by: Lee Zahler
- Production company: Larry Darmour Productions
- Distributed by: Columbia Pictures
- Release date: March 24, 1939
- Running time: 62 minutes
- Country: United States
- Language: English

Whispering Enemies is a 1939 American drama film directed by Lewis D. Collins and starring Jack Holt, Dolores Costello and Addison Richards.

== Cast ==
- Jack Holt as Stephen Brewster
- Dolores Costello as Laura Crandall
- Addison Richards as Red Barrett
- Joseph Crehan as George Harley
- Donald Briggs as Fred Bowman
- Paul Everton as Prison Warden
- Pert Kelton as Virginia Daniels

== Bibliography ==
- Darby, William. Masters of Lens and Light: A Checklist of Major Cinematographers and Their Feature Films. Scarecrow Press, 1991.
