= Fugitive from a Prison Camp =

- Theatrical film poster
- Directed by: Lewis D. Collins
- Written by: Albert DeMond; Stanley Roberts
- Produced by: Larry Darmour
- Starring: Jack Holt; Marian Marsh; Robert Barrat
- Cinematography: James S. Brown Jr.
- Edited by: Dwight Caldwell
- Music by: Lee Zahler
- Production company: Larry Darmour Productions
- Distributed by: Columbia Pictures
- Release date: October 5, 1940
- Running time: 59 minutes
- Country: United States
- Language: English

Fugitive from a Prison Camp is a 1940 American thriller film directed by Lewis D. Collins and starring Jack Holt, Marian Marsh and Robert Barrat.

== Plot ==
After an innocent man is picked up following a police raid, a sheriff tries to demonstrate his belief that first offenders should be given a chance.

== Cast ==
- Jack Holt as Sheriff Lawson
- Marian Marsh as Ann Baldwin
- Robert Barrat as Chester Russell
- Phillip Terry as Bill Harding
- Dennis Moore as Slugger Martin
- Jack La Rue as Red Nelson
- George Offerman Jr. as Ted Baldwin
- Frankie Burke as Sobby Taylor
- Donald Haines as Burly Bascomb
- Alan Baldwin as Jerome Davis
- Frank LaRue as Robert O'Brien
- Ernest Morrison as Chuckles
