= Her Father Said No =

1927 film

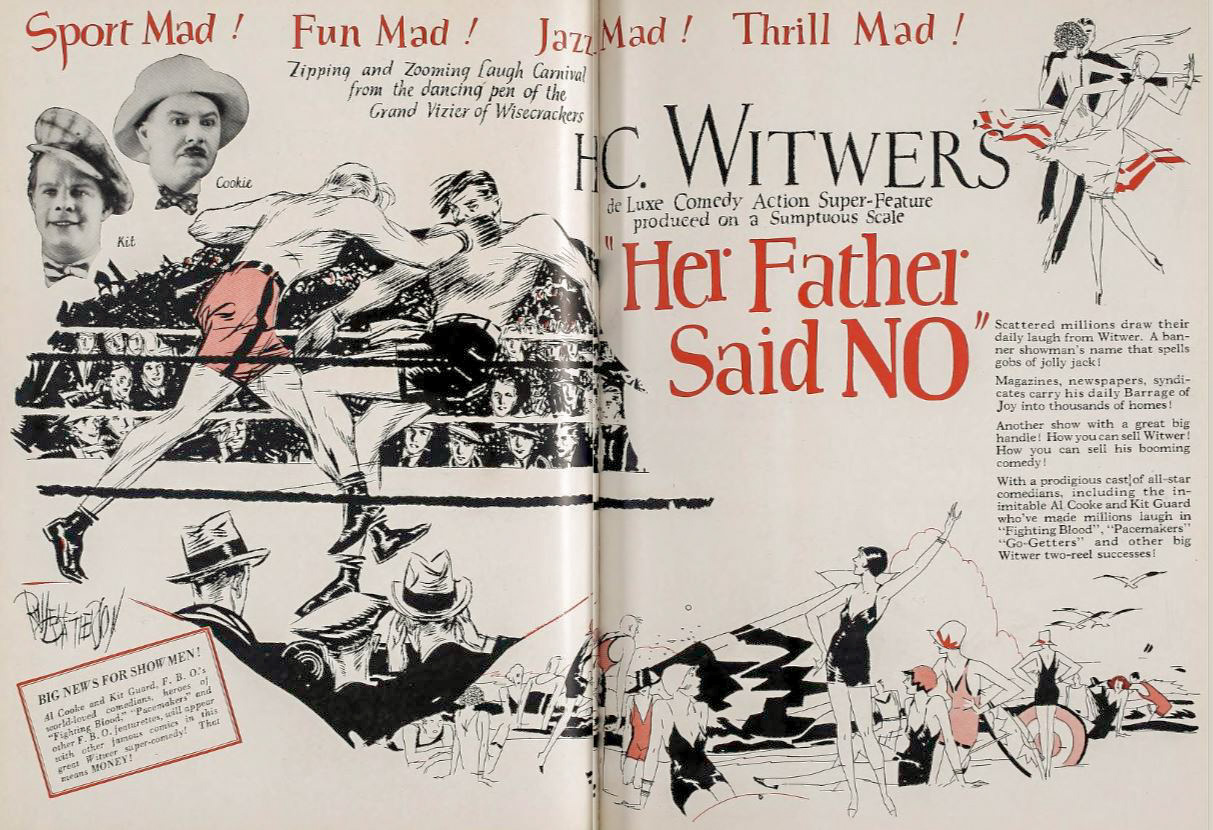
- Advertisement
- Directed by: Jack McKeown
- Screenplay by: Al Boasberg
- Story by: H. C. Witwer
- Starring: Mary Brian; Danny O'Shea; Al Cooke; Kit Guard; John Steppling; Frankie Darro
- Cinematography: H. Lyman Broening
- Production company: Robertson-Cole Pictures Corporation
- Distributed by: Film Booking Offices of America
- Release date: January 2, 1927
- Running time: 77 minutes
- Country: United States
- Language: Silent (English intertitles)

Scenes from the film

Her Father Said No is a 1927 American silent comedy film directed by Jack McKeown and written by Al Boasberg. The film stars Mary Brian, Danny O'Shea, Al Cooke, Kit Guard, John Steppling, and Frankie Darro. The film was released on January 2, 1927, by Film Booking Offices of America.

== Cast ==
- Mary Brian as Charlotte Hamilton
- Danny O'Shea as Danny Martin
- Al Cooke as Al Conklin
- Kit Guard as Kit Goodwin
- John Steppling as John Hamilton
- Frankie Darro as Matt Doe
- Gene Stone as Herbert Penrod
- Betty Caldwell as Betty Francis

== Preservation ==
With no prints of Her Father Said No located in any film archives, it is a lost film.
