= Charles F. Royal =

American screenwriter

- Born: January 27, 1880; Monmouth, Oregon, United States
- Died: July 26, 1955 (aged 75); San Diego, California, United States
- Other name: Charles Francis Royal
- Occupation: Screenwriter
- Years active: 1931–1951

Charles F. Royal (1880–1955) was an American screenwriter active primarily in the 1930 and 1940s. He worked on a number of western films for studios such as Columbia and Republic Pictures.

== Selected filmography ==
- The Hawk (1931)
- The Courageous Avenger (1935)
- The New Adventures of Tarzan (1935)
- Shadows of the Orient (1935)
- Between Men (1935)
- The Fire Trap (1935)
- Western Courage (1935)
- Valley of the Lawless (1936)
- Tundra (1936)
- Outlaws of the Orient (1937)
- Lightnin' Crandall (1937)
- Guns in the Dark (1937)
- Ridin' the Lone Trail (1937)
- The Colorado Kid (1937)
- The Old Barn Dance (1938)
- Rio Grande (1938)
- The Colorado Trail (1938)
- Gangs of New York (1938)
- Trouble in Sundown (1939)
- Outpost of the Mounties (1939)
- Texas Stampede (1939)
- The Taming of the West (1939)
- The Man from Tumbleweeds (1940)
- Lone Star Raiders (1940)
- North from the Lone Star (1941)
- A Tornado in the Saddle (1942)
- Dark Mountain (1944)
- Arctic Fury (1949)

== Bibliography ==
- Pitts, Michael R. Poverty Row Studios, 1929–1940: An Illustrated History of 55 Independent Film Companies, with a Filmography for Each. McFarland & Company, 2005.
