= Heir to Trouble =

1935 film by Spencer Gordon Bennet

- Theatrical release poster
- Directed by: Spencer Gordon Bennet
- Screenplay by: Nate Gatzert
- Story by: Ken Maynard
- Produced by: Larry Darmour
- Starring: Ken Maynard; Joan Perry; Harry Woods; Martin Faust; Harry Bowen; Wally Wales
- Cinematography: Herbert Kirkpatrick
- Edited by: Dwight Caldwell
- Production company: Larry Darmour Productions
- Distributed by: Columbia Pictures
- Release date: December 17, 1935
- Running time: 59 minutes
- Country: United States
- Language: English

Heir to Trouble is a 1935 American Western film directed by Spencer Gordon Bennet and written by Nate Gatzert. The film stars Ken Maynard, Joan Perry, Harry Woods, Martin Faust, Harry Bowen and Wally Wales. The film was released on December 17, 1935, by Columbia Pictures.

== Cast ==
- Ken Maynard as Ken Armstrong
- Joan Perry as Jane Parker
- Harry Woods as Honest John Motley
- Martin Faust as Ike Davis
- Harry Bowen as Hank Carter
- Wally Wales as 'Spurs' Hawkins
- Dorothea Wolbert as Tillie Tilks
- Fern Emmett as Amanda Witherspoon
- Pat O'Malley as Bill Dwyer
