= The Strange Case of Dr. Meade =

1938 film by Lewis D. Collins

- Directed by: Lewis D. Collins
- Written by: Carlton Sand; Gordon Rigby
- Produced by: Larry Darmour
- Starring: Jack Holt
- Cinematography: James S. Brown Jr.
- Edited by: Dwight Caldwell
- Production company: Larry Darmour Productions
- Distributed by: Columbia Pictures
- Release date: December 15, 1938
- Running time: 60 minutes
- Country: United States
- Language: English

The Strange Case of Dr. Meade is a 1938 American adventure film directed by Lewis D. Collins and starring Jack Holt, Beverly Roberts and Noah Beery Jr.

== Cast ==
- Jack Holt as Dr. Meade
- Beverly Roberts as Bonnie
- Noah Beery Jr. as Mart
- John Qualen as Stoner
- Paul Everton as Dr. Hazard
- Charles Middleton as Lacey
- Helen Jerome Eddy as Mrs. Lacey
- Arthur Aylesworth as Reuben
- Barbara Pepper as Mattie
- Victor Potel as Steve
- Harry Woods as Harper
- Claire Du Brey as Mrs. Thurber
- George Cleveland as Thurber
- Jay Ward as Rufe
- Hollis Jewell as Thad

== Bibliography ==
- Darby, William. Masters of Lens and Light: A Checklist of Major Cinematographers and Their Feature Films. Scarecrow Press, 1991.
