= Heroes of the Range =

1936 film by Spencer Gordon Bennet

- Directed by: Spencer Gordon Bennet
- Written by: Nate Gatzert
- Produced by: Larry Darmour
- Starring: Ken Maynard; June Gale; Harry Woods
- Cinematography: James S. Brown Jr.
- Edited by: Dwight Caldwell
- Production company: Larry Darmour Productions
- Distributed by: Columbia Pictures
- Release date: August 18, 1936
- Running time: 56 minutes
- Country: United States
- Language: English

Heroes of the Range is a 1936 American Western film directed by Spencer Gordon Bennet and starring Ken Maynard, June Gale and Harry Woods.

== Cast ==
- Ken Maynard as Ken Smith
- June Gale as Joan Peters
- Harry Woods as Bull Lamton
- Harry Ernest as Johnny Peters
- Bob Kortman as Slick
- Bud McClure as Lem
- Tom London as Bud
- Bud Osborne as Jake
- Frank Hagney as Lightning Smith
- Jack Rockwell as Sheriff

== Bibliography ==
- Jeremy Agnew. The Creation of the Cowboy Hero: Fiction, Film and Fact. McFarland, 2014.
