= Sea Devils (1931 film) =

1931 film

- Directed by: Joseph Levering
- Written by: Scott Littleton
- Produced by: Larry Darmour
- Starring: Molly O'Day; Edmund Burns; Walter Long
- Cinematography: James S. Brown Jr.
- Edited by: Dwight Caldwell
- Production company: Larry Darmour Productions
- Distributed by: Continental Talking Pictures
- Release date: January 15, 1931
- Running time: 58 minutes
- Country: United States
- Language: English

Sea Devils is a 1931 American pre-Code drama film directed by Joseph Levering and starring Molly O'Day, Edmund Burns and Walter Long.

== Cast ==
- Molly O'Day as Ann McCall
- Edmund Burns as Richard Charters
- Walter Long a Johnson the First Mate
- Paul Panzer as Steve the Radio Operator
- Henry Otto as Governor
- Jules Cowles as Attorney

== Bibliography ==
- Darby, William. Masters of Lens and Light: A Checklist of Major Cinematographers and Their Feature Films. Scarecrow Press, 1991.
