= Headin' for the Rio Grande =

- Theatrical release poster
- Directed by: Robert North Bradbury
- Screenplay by: Robert Emmett Tansey
- Story by: Lindsley Parsons
- Produced by: Lindsley Parsons
- Starring: Tex Ritter; Eleanor Stewart; Syd Saylor; Warner Richmond; Charles King; Earl Dwire; Forrest Taylor; William Desmond; Snub Pollard
- Cinematography: Gus Peterson
- Edited by: Fred Bain
- Music by: Frank Sanucci
- Production companies: Boots and Saddles Pictures
- Distributed by: Grand National Films Inc.
- Release date: December 20, 1936
- Running time: 60 minutes
- Country: United States
- Language: English

Headin' for the Rio Grande is a 1936 American Western film directed by Robert North Bradbury and written by Robert Emmett Tansey. The film stars Tex Ritter, Eleanor Stewart, Syd Saylor, Warner Richmond, Charles King, Earl Dwire, Forrest Taylor, William Desmond and Snub Pollard. The film was released on December 20, 1936, by Grand National Films Inc.

== Cast ==
- Tex Ritter as Tex Saunders
- Eleanor Stewart as Laura Hart
- Syd Saylor as Chili
- Warner Richmond as Ike Travis
- Charles King as Tick
- Earl Dwire as Rand
- Forrest Taylor as Sheriff Ed Saunders
- William Desmond as Mr. Mack
- Snub Pollard as Cookie
- Charles K. French as Pop Hart
- Budd Buster as Senator Black
- Bud Osborne as Cactus
- Jack C. Smith as Harper
