= Stagecoach Days =

1938 film by Joseph Levering

- Theatrical release poster
- Directed by: Joseph Levering
- Screenplay by: Nate Gatzert
- Produced by: Larry Darmour
- Starring: Jack Luden; Eleanor Stewart; Harry Woods; Wally Wales; Lafe McKee; Jack Ingram
- Cinematography: James S. Brown Jr.
- Edited by: Dwight Caldwell
- Production company: Columbia Pictures
- Distributed by: Columbia Pictures
- Release date: June 20, 1938
- Running time: 56 minutes
- Country: United States
- Language: English

Stagecoach Days is a 1938 American Western film directed by Joseph Levering and written by Nate Gatzert. The film stars Jack Luden, Eleanor Stewart, Harry Woods, Wally Wales, Lafe McKee and Jack Ingram. The film was released on June 20, 1938, by Columbia Pictures.

== Cast ==
- Jack Luden as Breezy Larkin
- Eleanor Stewart as Mary Larkin
- Harry Woods as Moose Ringo
- Wally Wales as Milt Dodds
- Lafe McKee as Tom Larkin
- Jack Ingram as Virg
- Slim Whitaker as Butch Flint
- Tuffy as Tuffy
