= Nate Gatzert =

American screenwriter

- Born: December 15, 1890; Chicago, Illinois, United States
- Died: September 1, 1959 (aged 68); Los Angeles, California, United States
- Occupation: Writer
- Years active: 1929–1939 (film)

Nate Gatzert (1890–1959) was an American screenwriter. He worked on the screenplays of a number of westerns for Columbia Pictures and Universal Pictures during the 1930s.

== Selected filmography ==
- The Royal Rider (1929)
- Strawberry Roan (1933)
- The Fiddlin' Buckaroo (1933)
- The Trail Drive (1933)
- Honor of the Range (1934)
- Smoking Guns (1934)
- Wheels of Destiny (1934)
- Rustlers of Red Dog (1935)
- Heir to Trouble (1935)
- The Roaring West (1935)
- Western Frontier (1935)
- Lawless Riders (1935)
- Western Courage (1935)
- Rio Grande Ranger (1936)
- The Cattle Thief (1936)
- Avenging Waters (1936)
- Heroes of the Range (1936)
- The Unknown Ranger (1936)
- The Fugitive Sheriff (1936)
- The Rangers Step In (1937)
- Reckless Ranger (1937)
- Law of the Ranger (1937)
- Ranger Courage (1937)
- Pioneer Trail (1938)
- Stagecoach Days (1938)
- In Early Arizona (1938)
- Rolling Caravans (1938)
- Phantom Gold (1938)
- Frontiers of '49 (1939)
- Lone Star Pioneers (1939)
- The Law Comes to Texas (1939)

== Bibliography ==
- Scott Allen Nollen. Three Bad Men: John Ford, John Wayne, Ward Bond. McFarland, 2013.
