= What Price Decency =

1933 film directed by Arthur Gregor

- Directed by: Arthur Gregor
- Written by: Arthur Gregor (play)
- Produced by: Larry Darmour; Phil Goldstone
- Starring: Dorothy Burgess; Alan Hale; Walter Byron
- Cinematography: Chester A. Lyons
- Edited by: Otis Garrett
- Production company: Equitable Pictures
- Distributed by: Majestic Pictures
- Release date: March 7, 1933
- Running time: 67 minutes
- Country: United States
- Language: English

What Price Decency is a 1933 American drama film directed by Arthur Gregor and starring Dorothy Burgess, Alan Hale and Walter Byron. The director adapted the story from one his own plays. It is now considered a lost film.

== Cast ==
- Dorothy Burgess as Norma
- Alan Hale as Klaus van Leyden
- Walter Byron as Tom O'Neil
- Henry Durant as Matizzi
- Val Duran as Pimo

== Bibliography ==
- Goble, Alan. The Complete Index to Literary Sources in Film. Walter de Gruyter, 1999.
