= Warner Richmond =

American actor

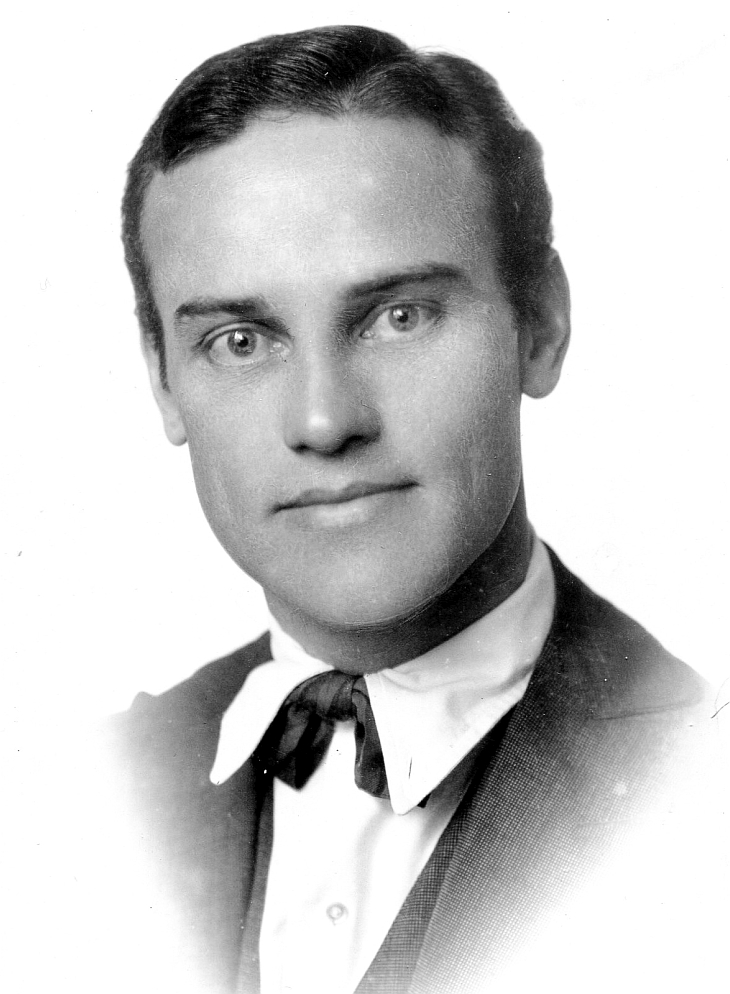
- Richmond c. 1915
- Born: Werner Paul Raetzmann; January 11, 1886; Racine, Wisconsin, U.S.
- Died: June 19, 1948 (aged 62); Los Angeles, California, U.S.
- Resting place: Chapel of the Pines Crematory
- Occupation: Actor
- Years active: 1912–1946
- Spouse: Felice Striker Rose (m. 1918–1948)
- Children: 1

Warner Richmond (born Werner Paul Otto Raetzmann; January 11, 1886 – June 19, 1948) was an American stage and film actor. He began his career as a stock theatre actor and appeared in films in both the silent film and sound eras. His career spanned four decades. He is possibly best recalled for appearances in Westerns in his later career in sound films. Between 1912 and 1946, he appeared in more than 140 films.

== Early life ==
Warner Richmond was born in Racine, Wisconsin, as Werner Paul Otto Raetzmann, one of seven children born to Wilhelm ("William") Raetzmann and Emilie ("Amelia") Licht. Richmond's father was a German immigrant from Hanover who worked as a printer in Reedsburg. His mother was Wisconsin-born and raised, and of German immigrant parents. Growing up in rural Wisconsin, he became an expert horseman, and this skill would later earn him roles in western movies. As a young man, he moved to Chicago and lived with his brother Ewald and worked as traveling salesman of musical merchandise while pursuing a career as a stage actor.

== Career ==
By the early 1910s, Richmond was working steadily as a travelling stage actor in stock theater. Richmond's only known credited Broadway stage role was in a 1913 production of the Augustus Thomas play Indian Summer, alongside Creighton Hale.

Richmond's first credited film appearance was as the character Dick in the 1912 Ralph Ince directed dramatic short The Godmother for Vitagraph Studios in New York City. By 1917 he was a working consistently as an actor at Solax Studios in Fort Lee, New Jersey. His first appearance in a Western genre film was as the character Dr. Newberry in House Peters' 1915 The Great Divide. When the film industry later relocated to southern California, Richmond and his family also moved and settled in the Los Angeles neighborhood of Toluca Lake. Richmond, who was not a contracted actor, made films with nearly all major film studios and by the late 1910s and early 1920s played both leading and second lead roles in crime dramas, romantic dramas, serials and Westerns. His career as an actor spanned over four decades and he appeared in prominent roles in Westerns, often playing a villain, particularly later in his career during the sound era.

In 1940, while filming the Albert Herman directed Tex Ritter Western Rainbow Over the Range in Prescott, Arizona, Richmond fell from his horse and suffered a fractured skull which left the left side of his face paralyzed and diminished vision in his left eye. Richmond was hospitalized for eight months following the accident and spent the following two years resting at home and massaging and pinching his face until his reflexes were restored. In 1944, he returned to films.

== Personal life and death ==
Richmond married actress Felice Striker Rose on October 31, 1918. They had a son, Warner Richmond Jr. in 1921.

In the late 1940s, Richmond retired to the Motion Picture Country Home where he died on June 19, 1948, of coronary thrombosis, aged 62. He was cremated at the Chapel of the Pines Crematory in Los Angeles.

== Selected filmography ==
- The Godmother (1912) - Dick - The Second Boy
- Springtime (1914) - Crawley
- Lady Audley's Secret (1915) - Sir Michael Audley
- The Great Divide (1915) - Dr. Newberry
- Betty of Greystone (1916)
- Her Maternal Right (1916)
- Manhattan Madness (1916) - Jack Osborne
- Fifty-Fifty (1916) - Dandy
- The Sporting Life (1918) - Joe Lee
- Woman (1918) - Civil War Officer
- A Romance of the Air (1918) - Minor Role
- Brown of Harvard (1918) - Claxton Madden
- The Gray Towers Mystery (1919) - Jean Bautiste
- My Lady's Garter (1919) - Meredith
- A Woman's Business (1920) - Brookes
- The Mountain Woman (1921) - Bud Sellers
- The Heart of Maryland (1921) - Tom Boone
- Tol'able David (1921) - Allen Kinemon
- Jan of the Big Snows (1922) - Jan Allaire
- Isle of Doubt (1922) - Gerry Patten
- The Challenge (1922) - Ralph Westley
- The Man from Glengarry (1922) - Ronald MacDonald
- Luck (1923) - Pollard
- Mark of the Beast (1923) - Donald Duncan
- The Speed Spook (1924) - Jud Skerrit
- Daughters of the Night (1924) - Lawyer Kilmaster
- Fear-Bound (1925) - Ed Tumble
- The Crowded Hour (1925) - Operator
- The Making of O'Malley (1925) - Danny the Dude
- The Pace That Thrills (1925) - Jack Van Loren
- The Wives of the Prophet (1926) - Ben Blake
- Good and Naughty (1926) - Bad News Smith
- The Fire Brigade (1926) - Jim O'Neil
- Finger Prints (1927) - Andy 'Annie Laurie' Norton
- Slide, Kelly, Slide (1927) - Cliff Macklin
- White Flannels (1927) - Ed
- Irish Hearts (1927) - Emmett
- The Heart of Maryland (1927) - Capt. Fulton Thorpe
- Chicago (1927) - Asst. District Attorney
- Hearts of Men (1928) - William Starke
- The Crowd (1928) - Mr. Sims - John's Father (uncredited)
- You Can't Beat the Law (1928) - Bowery Blackie
- Stop That Man! (1928) - Jim O'Brien
- Shadows of the Night (1928) - Feagan
- The Apache (1928) - Gaston Laroux
- The Voice of the Storm (1929) - Dobbs
- Stark Mad (1929) - First Mate
- The Redeeming Sin (1929) - Lupine
- Strange Cargo (1929) - Neil Stoker
- Little Mother (1929, Short) - Father
- Big News (1929) - Phelps - District Attorney's Man
- Men Without Women (1930) - Lt. Cmdr. Briddwell
- Strictly Modern (1930) - Judge Bartlett
- Billy the Kid (1930) - Bob Ballinger
- Remote Control (1930) - Max
- Quick Millions (1931) - 'Nails' Markey
- Huckleberry Finn (1931) - Pap Finn
- Stung (1931) - Racketeer
- The Woman from Monte Carlo (1932) - Fourdylis
- The Beast of the City (1932) - Tom
- Scarface (1932) - Cesca's Dance Partner (uncredited)
- Night Court (1932) - Ed - Frame-Up Man (uncredited)
- Strangers of the Evening (1932) - Dr. Joseph Chandler
- Hell's Highway (1932) - 'Pop-Eye' Jackson
- Fast Workers (1933) - Feets Wilson
- King of the Jungle (1933) - Gus (uncredited)
- Corruption (1933) - Regan
- The Man Who Dared (1933) - Neighborhood Hood (uncredited)
- Life in the Raw (1933) - Harvey (H.B.) Lamson
- Mama Loves Papa (1933) - The Radical
- Police Call (1933) - Sammy
- This Day and Age (1933) - Defense Attorney
- The Lost Jungle (1934) - Sharkey
- The Scarlet Empress (1934) - Castle Guard (uncredited)
- Gift of Gab (1934) - Cop (uncredited)
- Happy Landing (1934) - Powell
- Fugitive Lady (1934) - Saunders (uncredited)
- The Band Plays On (1934) - Lumberjack (uncredited)
- Under Pressure (1935) - Weasel
- The Phantom Empire (1935) - Rab
- Mississippi (1935) - Man at Bar Who Pulls a Gun (uncredited)
- Straight from the Heart (1935) - Cop (uncredited)
- Smokey Smith (1935) - Kent
- The Headline Woman (1935) - Henchman Bradley
- So Red the Rose (1935) - Confederate Sergeant
- Chinatown Squad (1935) - Detective (uncredited)
- Rainbow's End (1935) - Thomas Stark
- The Last Days of Pompeii (1935) - Captain of the Guard (uncredited)
- The New Frontier (1935) - Ace Holmes
- Remember Last Night? (1935) - Policeman (uncredited)
- The Fighting Marines (1935, Serial) - Metcalf - Henchman
- The Courageous Avenger (1935) - Gorman
- The Singing Vagabond (1935) - Buck LaCrosse
- Heart of the West (1936) - Johnson
- Hearts in Bondage (1936) - Bucko (uncredited)
- Wolves of the Sea (1936) - Snoden
- Below the Deadline (1936) - Diamond Dutch
- Missing Girls (1936) - Ray Hanson
- In His Steps (1936) - Gavin
- White Legion (1936) - Burke
- Song of the Gringo (1936) - Henchman Cherokee
- Headin' for the Rio Grande (1936) - Ike Travis
- Trail of Vengeance (1937) - Link Carson
- The Gold Racket (1937) - Doc Johnson
- A Lawman Is Born (1937) - Kane Briscoe
- The 13th Man (1937) - George Crandall
- Doomed at Sundown (1937) - Jim Hatfield
- Riders of the Dawn (1937) - Jim Danti
- Stars Over Arizona (1937) - Ace Carter
- Where Trails Divide (1937) - Mississippi Blackie Wilson
- Federal Bullets (1937) - Henchman Burke
- Wallaby Jim of the Islands (1937) - Karl Haage, Richter Henchman
- Child Bride (1938) - Jake Bolby
- The Secret of Treasure Island (1938, Serial) - Capt. Tom Stanton, alias Capt. Tom Faxton [Ch.1]
- Flash Gordon's Trip to Mars (1938, Serial) - Zandar
- Six Shootin' Sheriff (1938) - Ace Kendal
- The Singing Cowgirl (1938) - Henchman Garrick
- Prairie Moon (1938) - Mullins
- Wild Horse Canyon (1938) - Travers
- Water Rustlers (1939) - Wiley
- Trigger Smith (1939) - Gallop
- The Oregon Trail (1939, Serial) - General Sherman [Ch.1] (uncredited)
- Fighting Mad (1939) - Henchman Trigger
- Rhythm of the Rio Grande (1940) - Buck
- Pals of the Silver Sage (1940) - Sheriff
- The Golden Trail (1940) - Henchman Chris
- Rainbow Over the Range (1940) - Gene Griffin
- Outlaw Trail (1944) - Judd Hansen
- Colorado Serenade (1946) - Dad Dillon
- Wild West (1946) - Judge Templeton
