= Larry Darmour =

American film producer

- Born: Lawrence J. Darmour; January 8, 1895; Flushing, New York, United States
- Died: March 17, 1942 (aged 47); Los Angeles, California, United States
- Occupation: Producer
- Years active: 1916-1942

Lawrence J. Darmour (January 8, 1895 – March 17, 1942) was an American film producer who founded Larry Darmour Productions in 1926, which was part of Hollywood's low-budget production community.

== Career ==
Darmour was born in Flushing, Queens, New York. After completing his education at Princeton University, he entered the motion picture industry as a film inspector for the Gaumont company. Within the year he was a newsreel cameraman, offering his footage to both the Gaumont and the Mutual weekly newsreels. He enlisted in the U. S. Army during World War I and served in the Signal Corps as a cameraman. He had the distinction of being the first American soldier on the battlefield at Chateau-Thierry; he had been taking a stroll along the front the night before the Allied forces were scheduled to attack. He awoke to find himself in the middle of a barrage, the only soldier on the field.

After the war he resumed his work in newsreels. He joined Lewis J. Selznick's company as editor of its newsreel, and was promoted to vice president of Selznick's distributing arm.

== Producer ==
In 1925 Darmour organized Standard Cinema Corporation, best known today for releasing short comedies produced by Joe Rock and starring Stan Laurel. The following year, Darmour opened his own studio at 5823 Santa Monica Boulevard in Los Angeles.

In September 1927 he produced the first of the Mickey McGuire series of short subjects, based on the Fontaine Fox comic strip and starring a young Mickey Rooney. The series ran for seven years, encompassing some 60 two-reel comedies between 1927 and 1934. They were released through Joseph P. Kennedy's FBO, and then FBO's successor RKO Radio Pictures. Rooney's popularity prompted Darmour to expand his line of comedy shorts, including the Toots and Casper series with Thelma Hill and Bud Duncan, and star vehicles for Karl Dane and George K. Arthur, Alberta Vaughn, Louise Fazenda, and others.

== Majestic Pictures ==
Entering the feature-film market in 1931, Darmour founded Majestic Pictures, with himself as company president. The company's first feature was Sea Devils (1931), starring Molly O'Day. Majestic began producing a stream of dramas and thrillers for small neighborhood theaters. Darmour gave these films higher production values than the usual independent features, with expensive-looking sets (often rented from larger studios) and big-name casts familiar from major motion pictures. Majestic's most famous feature is probably The Vampire Bat (1933), a horror thriller starring Lionel Atwill, Fay Wray, Melvyn Douglas, Dwight Frye, and George E. Stone. Majestic ceased operations in 1935 when film executive Herbert J. Yates consolidated several smaller studios into the new Republic Pictures. Larry Darmour withdrew from Republic and arranged to release his films through Columbia Pictures.

== Columbia Pictures ==
Darmour produced dozens of action and western features for Columbia. In 1937 he took over Columbia's popular Jack Holt series, and signed Ken Maynard for a series of westerns. He also produced Columbia's "Ranger" westerns with Bob Allen and a companion series of westerns with Bill Elliott. Darmour's name does not appear on his Columbia productions – this was company policy at Columbia, where staff producers like Jack Fier often worked without screen credit.

In 1940 Darmour was entrusted with production of Columbia's serials. Darmour, already very busy with feature films, placed serial veteran and comedy director James W. Horne in complete charge of the serial unit. Horne freely indulged his sense of humor in such serials as The Green Archer, Terry and the Pirates, and Holt of the Secret Service (Holt's last film for Darmour, and only serial). Horne's serials combine action and adventure with tongue-in-cheek comedy.

Darmour was also assigned Columbia's Ellery Queen series of detective-mystery features, which he produced through 1942.

== Illness and death ==
Darmour underwent an abdominal operation in late 1941 and never recovered; he died three months later. His production units became the responsibility of Columbia staff producer Rudolph C. Flothow. The Majestic physical plant, known informally as "the Darmour studio", continued to operate as the Larry Darmour Studio after his death, and closed its doors in 1949.

== Filmography ==
In addition to numerous shorts and serials, Darmour produced the following feature films:

- Sea Devils (1931)
- Defenders of the Law (1931)
- Air Eagles (1931)
- The Vanishing Frontier (1932)
- The Crusader (1932)
- The Unwritten Law (1932)
- Manhattan Tower (1932)
- Law and Lawless (1932)
- Outlaw Justice (1932)
- Via Pony Express (1933)
- Gun Law (1933)
- The Vampire Bat (1933)
- Trouble Busters (1933)
- What Price Decency (1933)
- The World Gone Mad (1933)
- Cheating Blondes (1933)
- Sing Sinner Sing (1933)
- Curtain at Eight (1933)
- Gigolettes of Paris (1933)
- The Sin of Nora Moran (1933)
- Unknown Blonde (1934)
- The Scarlet Letter (1934)
- She Had to Choose (1934)
- Night Alarm (1934)
- The Fire Trap (1935)
- The Awakening of Jim Burke (1935)
- The Perfect Clue (1935)
- Shadows of the Orient (1935)
- Reckless Roads (1935)
- Western Frontier (1935)
- Heir to Trouble (1935)
- Motive for Revenge (1935)
- Western Courage (1935)
- Lawless Riders (1935)
- Mutiny Ahead (1935)
- Heroes of the Range (1936)
- Avenging Waters (1936)
- Ranger Courage (1936)
- The Cattle Thief (1936)
- North of Nome (1936)
- The Fugitive Sheriff (1936)
- Rio Grande Ranger (1936)
- The Unknown Ranger (1936)
- Trouble in Morocco (1937)
- Law of the Ranger (1937)
- Reckless Ranger (1937)
- Roaring Timber (1937)
- The Rangers Step In (1937)
- Outlaws of the Orient (1937)
- Under Suspicion (1937)
- Trapped by G-Men (1937)
- Rolling Caravans (1938)
- Making the Headlines (1938)
- Phantom Gold (1938)
- Crime Takes a Holiday (1938)
- The Strange Case of Dr. Meade (1938)
- Pioneer Trail (1938)
- Flight into Nowhere (1938)
- Stagecoach Days (1938)
- Reformatory (1938)
- In Early Arizona (1938)
- Frontiers of '49 (1939)
- Whispering Enemies (1939)
- The Law Comes to Texas (1939)
- Hidden Power (1939)
- Lone Star Pioneers (1939)
- Fugitive at Large (1939)
- Trapped in the Sky (1939)
- Passport to Alcatraz (1940)
- The Great Plane Robbery (1940)
- Outside the Three-Mile Limit (released outside the United States as Mutiny on the Seas) (1940)
- Ellery Queen, Master Detective (1940)
- Fugitive from a Prison Camp (1940)
- The Great Swindle (1941)
- Ellery Queen's Penthouse Mystery (1941)
- Ellery Queen and the Perfect Crime (1941)
- Ellery Queen and the Murder Ring (1941)
- A Close Call for Ellery Queen (1942)
- A Desperate Chance for Ellery Queen (1942)
