= The Great Swindle (1941 film) =

American mystery film by Lewis D. Collins

- Directed by: Lewis D. Collins
- Written by: Albert DeMond; Eric Taylor
- Produced by: Larry Darmour
- Starring: Jack Holt; Jonathan Hale; Henry Kolker; Marjorie Reynolds; Sidney Blackmer
- Cinematography: James S. Brown Jr.
- Edited by: Dwight Caldwell
- Music by: Lee Zahler
- Production company: Larry Darmour Productions
- Distributed by: Columbia Pictures
- Release date: April 10, 1941
- Running time: 58 minutes
- Country: United States
- Language: English

The Great Swindle is a 1941 American mystery film directed by Lewis D. Collins and starring Jack Holt, Jonathan Hale and Henry Kolker. It was produced by Larry Darmour for distribution by Columbia Pictures.

== Synopsis ==
An insurance investigator is assigned to find out about a warehouse burnt down by a gang of arsonists.

== Cast ==
- Jack Holt as Jack Regan
- Jonathan Hale as Swann
- Henry Kolker as Stewart Cordell
- Marjorie Reynolds as Margaret Swann
- Don Douglas as Bill Farrow
- Boyd Irwin as Thomas Marshall
- Sidney Blackmer as Dave Lennox
- Douglas Fowley as Rocky Andrews
- Tom Kennedy as Capper Smith

== Bibliography ==
- Darby, William. Masters of Lens and Light: A Checklist of Major Cinematographers and Their Feature Films. Scarecrow Press, 1991.
- Fetrow, Alan G. Feature Films, 1940-1949: a United States Filmography. McFarland, 1994.
