= Western Courage (1935 film) =

1935 film

- Directed by: Spencer Gordon Bennet
- Written by: Nate Gatzert; Charles F. Royal
- Produced by: Larry Darmour
- Starring: Ken Maynard; Geneva Mitchell; Charles K. French
- Cinematography: Herbert Kirkpatrick
- Edited by: Dwight Caldwell
- Music by: Lee Zahler
- Production company: Larry Darmour Productions
- Distributed by: Columbia Pictures
- Release date: October 29, 1935
- Running time: 61 minutes
- Country: United States
- Language: English

Western Courage is a 1935 American Western film directed by Spencer Gordon Bennet and starring Ken Maynard, Geneva Mitchell and Charles K. French.

== Cast ==
- Ken Maynard as Ken Baxter
- Geneva Mitchell as Gloria Hanley
- Charles K. French as Henry Hanley
- Betty Blythe as Mrs. Hanley
- Cornelius Keefe as Eric Simpson
- Ward Bond as Lacrosse
- E.H. Calvert as Colonel Austin
- Renee Whitney as Eric's Girl Friend
- Hal Taliaferro as Slim

== Bibliography ==
- Pitts, Michael R. Western Movies: A Guide to 5,105 Feature Films. McFarland, 2012.
