= The Unknown Ranger =

1936 film by Spencer Gordon Bennet

- Directed by: Spencer Gordon Bennet
- Written by: Nate Gatzert
- Produced by: Larry Darmour
- Starring: Bob Allen; Martha Tibbetts; Walter Miller
- Cinematography: James S. Brown Jr.
- Edited by: Dwight Caldwell
- Production companies: Columbia Pictures; Larry Darmour Productions
- Release date: October 30, 1936 (US)
- Running time: 59 minutes
- Country: United States
- Language: English

The Unknown Ranger is a 1936 American Western film directed by Spencer Gordon Bennet and starring Bob Allen, Martha Tibbetts, and Walter Miller. It was released on October 30, 1936.

== Cast ==
- Bob Allen as himself
- Martha Tibbetts as Alice
- Walter Miller as Bull
- Buzz Henry as Buzzy (credited as Buzzy Henry)
- Bud Osborne as Steve
- Robert Kortman as Toady (credited as Bob Kortman)
- Harry Strang as Snaky Joe
- William Gould as Harper (credited as Bill Gould)
- Horace Murphy
- Al Taylor
