= Pioneer Trail (film) =

1938 film directed by Joseph Levering

- Directed by: Joseph Levering
- Written by: Nate Gatzert
- Produced by: Larry Darmour
- Starring: Jack Luden; Joan Barclay; Slim Whitaker
- Cinematography: James S. Brown Jr.
- Edited by: Dwight Caldwell
- Production company: Larry Darmour Productions
- Distributed by: Columbia Pictures
- Release date: July 15, 1938
- Running time: 59 minutes
- Country: United States
- Language: English

Pioneer Trail is a 1938 American Western film directed by Joseph Levering and starring Jack Luden, Joan Barclay and Slim Whitaker.

== Cast ==
- Jack Luden as Breezy
- Joan Barclay as Alice Waite
- Slim Whitaker as Curley
- Leon Beaumon as Henchman Joe
- Hal Taliaferro as Henchman Smokey
- Marin Sais as Belle
- Eva McKenzie as Ma Allen
- Hal Price as Baron Waite
- Dick Botiller as Pedro
- Tom London as Sam Harden

== Bibliography ==
- Pitts, Michael R. Western Movies: A Guide to 5,105 Feature Films. McFarland, 2012.
