= Rainbow Over the Range =

- Theatrical release poster
- Directed by: Albert Herman
- Screenplay by: Robert Emmett Tansey; Roger Merton
- Story by: Roland Lynch
- Produced by: Edward Finney
- Starring: Tex Ritter; Slim Andrews; Dorothy Fay; Gene Alsace; Warner Richmond; James Pierce
- Cinematography: Marcel Le Picard
- Edited by: Fred Bain
- Production company: Monogram Pictures
- Distributed by: Monogram Pictures
- Release date: July 29, 1940
- Running time: 60 minutes
- Country: United States
- Language: English

Rainbow Over the Range is a 1940 American Western film directed by Albert Herman and written by Robert Emmett Tansey and Roger Merton. The film stars Tex Ritter, Slim Andrews, Dorothy Fay, Gene Alsace, Warner Richmond and James Pierce. The film was released on July 29, 1940, by Monogram Pictures.

== Plot ==
A gang of horse thieves have killed the sheriff and his deputy and have stolen all the horses that Jeff Manners needs to fulfill his contract with the U. S. Cavalry, then U.S. Marshal Tex Reed and his pal, Slim Chance, arrive in town. Tex then beats gang member Bart Griffin in a fight, Rader and Griffin decide to get Tex out of the way. They frame Jeff, but he joins forces with Tex in time to stop another horse raid in which Slim is injured.

== Cast ==
- Tex Ritter as Tex Reed
- Slim Andrews as Slim Chance
- Dorothy Fay as Mary Manners
- Gene Alsace as Bart
- Warner Richmond as Gene Griffin
- James Pierce as Jim Rader
- Chuck Morrison as Buck Reding
- Dennis Moore as Jeff Manners
- Charles Wilcox as Musician
- Ted Bronson as Musician
- Garland Edmundson as Musician
- Zoebra McLain Jackson as Singer
- Pinkie Jackson as Musician
