= Outlaws of the Orient =

1937 film by Ernest B. Schoedsack

- Film poster
- Directed by: Ernest B. Schoedsack
- Written by: Ralph Graves (story); Charles F. Royal; Paul Franklin
- Produced by: Larry Darmour
- Starring: Jack Holt
- Cinematography: James S. Brown Jr.
- Distributed by: Columbia Pictures
- Release date: August 20, 1937
- Running time: 61 minutes
- Country: United States
- Language: English

Outlaws of the Orient is a 1937 American adventure film directed by Ernest B. Schoedsack.

== Plot ==
Johnny Eaton, trouble-shooter for an American oil company drilling in China, leaves his bride-to-be to head for the Orient and straighten out problems at the inland concession site his company controls. Chet Eaton, Johnny's brother and in charge of the China operation, is drinking too much, and a local Tartar bandit, Ho-Fing, is raiding and sabotaging the operation after being bribed by a rival company. Johnny bribes him, too, but Ho-Fing is a what-have-you-done-for-me-lately guy and doesn't stay bribed. Johnny decides that hand grenades speak louder than money and have a longer-lasting effect on Oriental bandits.

== Cast ==
- Jack Holt as Chet Eaton
- Mae Clarke as Joan Manning
- Harold Huber as Gen. Ho-Fang
- Ray Walker as Lucky Phelps
- James Bush as Johnny Eaton
- Joseph Crehan as Snyder
- Beatrice Roberts as Alice
