= The Big Bluff (1933 American film) =

1933 film

- Directed by: Reginald Denny
- Written by: Reginald Denny; Faith Thomas
- Produced by: George W. Weeks
- Starring: Reginald Denny; Claudia Dell; Donald Keith
- Cinematography: James S. Brown Jr.
- Edited by: Byron Robinson
- Music by: Lee Zahler
- Production company: Tower Productions
- Distributed by: Capitol Film Exchange
- Release date: October 11, 1933
- Running time: 60 minutes
- Country: United States
- Language: English

The Big Bluff is a 1933 American comedy film directed by Reginald Denny and starring Denny, Claudia Dell and Donald Keith. It was produced by George W. Weeks and the independent Tower Productions. The film's sets were designed by the art director Paul Palmentola.

== Plot ==
An actor from a touring theatrical troupe is hired to impersonate an English lord by a small town social climber in order to impress their rival acquaintance who has thrown a party for a British aristocrat. Confusion arises when other members of the theatrical company join in the impersonation. It ultimately emerges that the other aristocrat is a fake, while the actor really is secretly a peer.

== Cast ==
- Reginald Denny
- Claudia Dell
- Donald Keith
- Jed Prouty
- Cyril Chadwick
- Phil Tead
- Alden Gay
- Rhea Mitchell
- Lucille Ward
- Ethel Wales
- Eric Wilton
- Ben Hall

== Bibliography ==
- Fetrow, Alan G. Sound films, 1927-1939: a United States Filmography. McFarland, 1992.
- Pitts, Michael R. Poverty Row Studios, 1929–1940: An Illustrated History of 55 Independent Film Companies, with a Filmography for Each. McFarland & Company, 2005.
