= Where Trails Divide =

1937 film

- Directed by: Robert N. Bradbury
- Written by: Robert Emmett Tansey
- Produced by: Robert N. Bradbury
- Starring: Tom Keene; Warner Richmond; Eleanor Stewart
- Cinematography: Bert Longenecker
- Edited by: Howard Dillinger
- Music by: Frank Sanucci
- Production company: Monogram Pictures
- Distributed by: Monogram Pictures
- Release date: October 13, 1937
- Running time: 60 minutes
- Country: United States
- Language: English

Where Trails Divide is a 1937 American Western film directed by Robert N. Bradbury and starring Tom Keene, Warner Richmond and Eleanor Stewart.

== Plot ==
Tom Allen (Tom Keene), a young lawyer employed by an express company, arrives in the rough frontier town of Rawhide intending to open a law office. He is actually operating undercover to investigate a persistent gang of outlaws who have been robbing express shipments and terrorizing the area. Upon his arrival, circumstances quickly change: instead of practicing law, Tom becomes the town sheriff. He sets out to confront the outlaw gang led by the ruthless Mississippi Blackie Wilson (Warner Richmond), a tough and cunning bandit boss.

A personal stake complicates Tom's mission—he hopes and fears that his estranged younger brother Billy (Dave Sharpe) is not involved with Wilson's gang. This brother-against-brother tension adds emotional weight to the story as Tom pursues justice while trying to determine Billy's true allegiance. With the help of allies in the community, the sheriff uncovers the gang's operations, faces ambushes and gunfights, and works to bring Wilson and his men to justice.

== Cast ==
- Tom Keene as Tom Allen
- Warner Richmond as Mississippi Blackie Wilson
- Eleanor Stewart as Nora Hart
- Lorraine Randall as Bess Lane
- David Sharpe as Billy Allen
- Hal Price as Happy Days
- James Sheridan as Henchman Spade
- Richard Cramer as Ike Jones
- Jim Mason as Henchman Red
- Forrest Taylor as Councilman Gray
- Charles K. French as Deacon Evans
- Steve Clark as Henchman Wheezer
- Murdock MacQuarrie as Town Councilman
- Victor Adamson as Stagecoach Guard

== Bibliography ==
- James Robert Parish & Michael R. Pitts. Film directors: a guide to their American films. Scarecrow Press, 1974.
