= She Had to Choose =

1934 film by Ralph Ceder

- film still with Isabel Jewell and Regis Toomey
- Directed by: Ralph Ceder
- Written by: Houston Branch (writer); Izola Forrester (story); Mann Page (story)
- Produced by: Larry Darmour (executive producer), Majestic Pictures
- Starring: Buster Crabbe; Isabel Jewell; Sally Blane
- Cinematography: James S. Brown Jr.
- Edited by: Charles Harris
- Distributed by: Majestic Pictures
- Release date: October 1, 1934
- Running time: 65 minutes
- Country: United States
- Language: English

She Had to Choose is a 1934 American romantic comedy crime drama film directed by Ralph Ceder and starring Buster Crabbe, Isabel Jewell and Sally Blane. Distributed by Majestic Pictures, it is set in California during The Depression.

== Plot ==
Sally Bates (Isabel Jewell) leaves Texas, headed for Hollywood, in the 1930s. She is tempted to take a job as a mechanic, with Pop (Arthur Stone), on the highway, but presses on in to town.

She's going to sleep in her old "Tin Lizzie". But after she saves Bill's neck (Buster Crabbe) with her old six-shooter during a botched hold-up, Bill takes her home to live with his mom (Maidel Turner), and gives her a job at his drive-in restaurant.

Sally's friendly and easy going manner is very popular with the customers, but Bill gets jealous when Jack (Regis Toomey), the reckless younger brother of his well-to-do girlfriend Clara (Sally Blane), starts paying Sally attention, following her around in his roadster.

Sally is so humiliated when Clara rips off the dress Jack gave her, at a nightclub, she ends up at his hotel room, married to Jack, after an ill-conceived night of drinking.

Bill arrives in the morning to confront the drunken Jack and take Sally home, but Jack trips and smashes his head, killing himself. Bill is under investigation for murder of the wealthy socialite.

Buster Crabbe and Sally Blane

== Cast ==
- Buster Crabbe as Bill Cutler
- Isabel Jewell as Sally Bates
- Sally Blane as Clara Berry
- Regis Toomey as Jack Berry
- Maidel Turner as Mrs. Cutler
- Fuzzy Knight as Wally
- Arthur Stone as Pop
- Edward Gargan as Higgins
- Huntley Gordon as Attorney
- Wallis Clark as District Attorney
- Kenneth Howell as Announcer
- Eddie Fetherston as Hold-Up Man
- Max Wagner as Hold-Up Man
