= Robert 'Buzz' Henry =

American actor and stuntman (1931–1971)

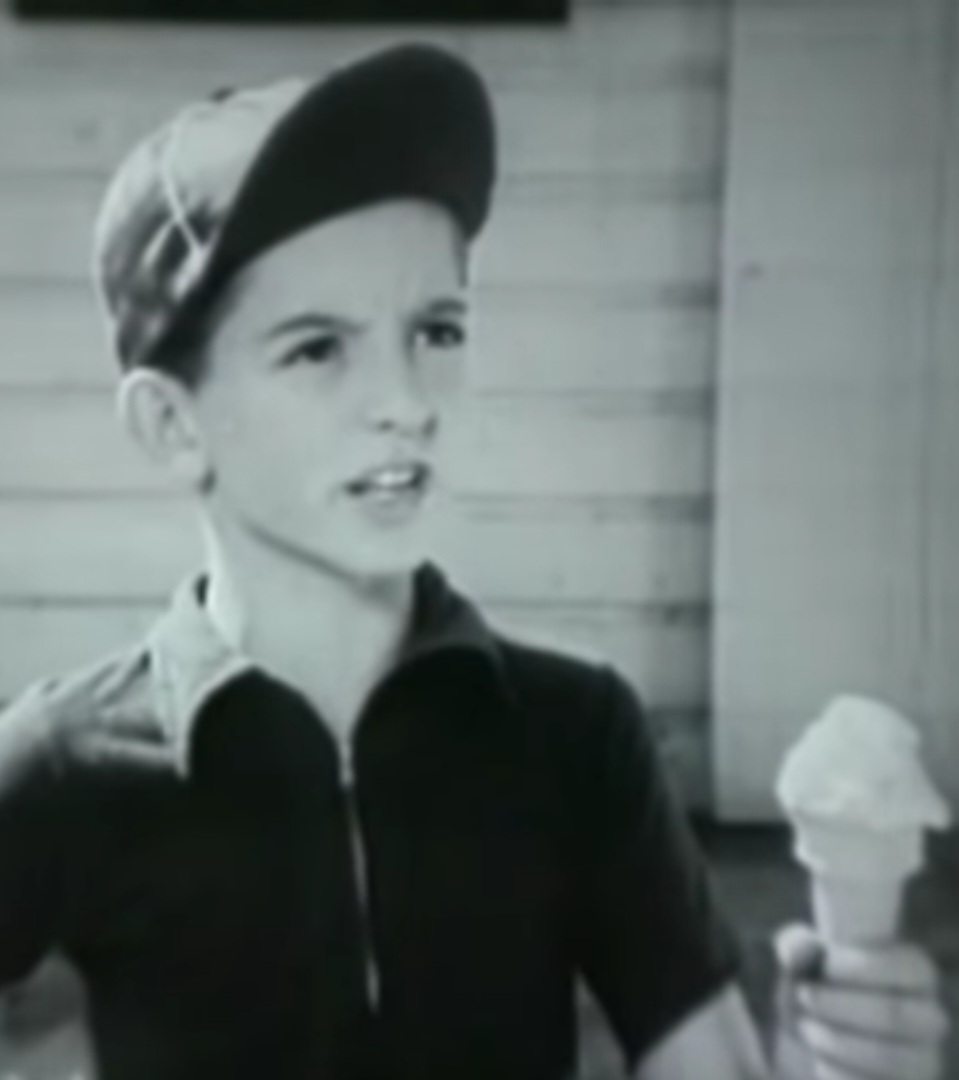
- Henry in Mr. Celebrity (1941)
- Born: Robert Dee Henry; September 4, 1931; Colorado, U.S.
- Died: September 30, 1971 (aged 40); Los Angeles, California, U.S.
- Occupations: Actor, stuntman
- Years active: 1933–1971

Robert Dee Henry (September 4, 1931 – September 30, 1971) was an American actor and stuntman. He starred in the 1946 serial film Hop Harrigan, in which he played Jackie Nolan.

== Life and career ==
Henry was born in Colorado, where his mother ran an equestrian facility and taught him to ride. He began his career in 1933 as a child actor in the film Little Women. He acted in Hollywood, California under the stage name Buzzy Henry. Henry also took part in rodeos and performed in vaudeville. He starred and co-starred in films such as Danny Boy, Ranger Courage, Calling Wild Bill Elliott, Western Frontier, Hop Harrigan, The Unknown Ranger, Buzzy and the Phantom Pinto, Trail to Gunsight, Law of the Canyon, Rio Grande Ranger, Mr. Celebrity, The Great Mike, Wild Beauty, Son of the Guardsman and Buzzy Rides the Range.

Henry doubled for the actor James Coburn in the films Our Man Flint and In Like Flint. He also doubled for Glenn Ford and Frank Sinatra. Henry also guest-starred in television programs including Mission: Impossible, State Trooper, Branded, The Adventures of Ozzie and Harriet, Tales of Wells Fargo, The Adventures of Wild Bill Hickok, Northwest Passage, Annie Oakley, Death Valley Days and Mannix.

== Death ==
In September 1971 Henry died in a motorcycle accident, losing control of his motorcycle while drag racing in Griffith Park and colliding with a car, injuring four teenagers.
