= Night Alarm =

- Directed by: Spencer Gordon Bennet
- Written by: Earle Snell (screenplay); Jack Stanley (story)
- Produced by: Larry Darmour
- Cinematography: James S. Brown Jr.
- Edited by: Dwight Caldwell
- Distributed by: Majestic Pictures
- Release date: December 11, 1934
- Running time: 64 minutes
- Country: United States
- Language: English

Night Alarm is a 1934 American drama film directed by Spencer Gordon Bennet and starring Bruce Cabot as a down-on-his-luck reporter, Hal Ashby, who tries to make a name for himself by investigating a series of bizarre arson attacks. The film, which was a hit in movie theatres at the time, is now widely available in the public domain.

== Plot summary ==
A reporter eager to move on from the dull gardening beat gets the opportunity to investigate a string of arson fires troubling the city. He believes the fires are tied into a web of political corruption involving a wealthy businessman, the mayor and the police chief. Complications ensue when the girl assigned to help him turns out to be the businessman's daughter.

== Cast ==
- Bruce Cabot as Hal Ashby
- Judith Allen as Helen Smith, posing as Mrs. Van Dusen
- H.B. Warner as Henry B. Smith
- Sam Hardy as Editor Stephen Caldwell
- Harry Holman as Mayor Wilson
- John Bleifer as Dr. Alexander Dexter
- Tom Hanlon as Vincent Van Dusen
- Betty Blythe as Elizabeth Van Dusen
- Fuzzy Knight as Dinner Club Comedian
