= Frontiers of '49 =

1939 film

- Later release poster by Astor Pictures
- Directed by: Joseph Levering
- Written by: Nate Gatzert
- Produced by: Larry Darmour
- Starring: Wild Bill Elliott; Luana Alcañiz; Charles King
- Cinematography: James S. Brown Jr.
- Edited by: Dwight Caldwell
- Music by: Lee Zahler
- Production company: Larry Darmour Productions
- Distributed by: Columbia Pictures; Astor Pictures (reissue)
- Release date: January 19, 1939
- Running time: 54 minutes
- Country: United States
- Language: English

Frontiers of '49 is a 1939 American Western film directed by Joseph Levering and starring Wild Bill Elliott, Luana Alcañiz and Charles King.

== Cast ==
- Wild Bill Elliott as Major John Freeman
- Luana Alcañiz as Dolores de Cervantes
- Charles King as Howard Brunton
- Hal Taliaferro as Kit
- Slim Whitaker as Deputy Sheriff Brad
- Octavio Giraud as Don Miguel Cervantes
- Carlos Villarías as Padre
- Joe De La Cruz as Ramon Romero
- Jack Walters as Pete Martin - Auctioneer
- Al Ferguson as Red - Henchman
- Buzz Barton as Auctioneer's Assistant
- Kit Guard as Bert - Brunton's Clerk
- Jack Ingram as Captain Beatty
- Bud Osborne as Judge Scott
- Lee Shumway as Bidding Rancher

== Bibliography ==
- Blottner, Gene. Wild Bill Elliott: A Complete Filmography. McFarland, 2011.
