= Eleanor Stewart =

American film actress (1913-2007)

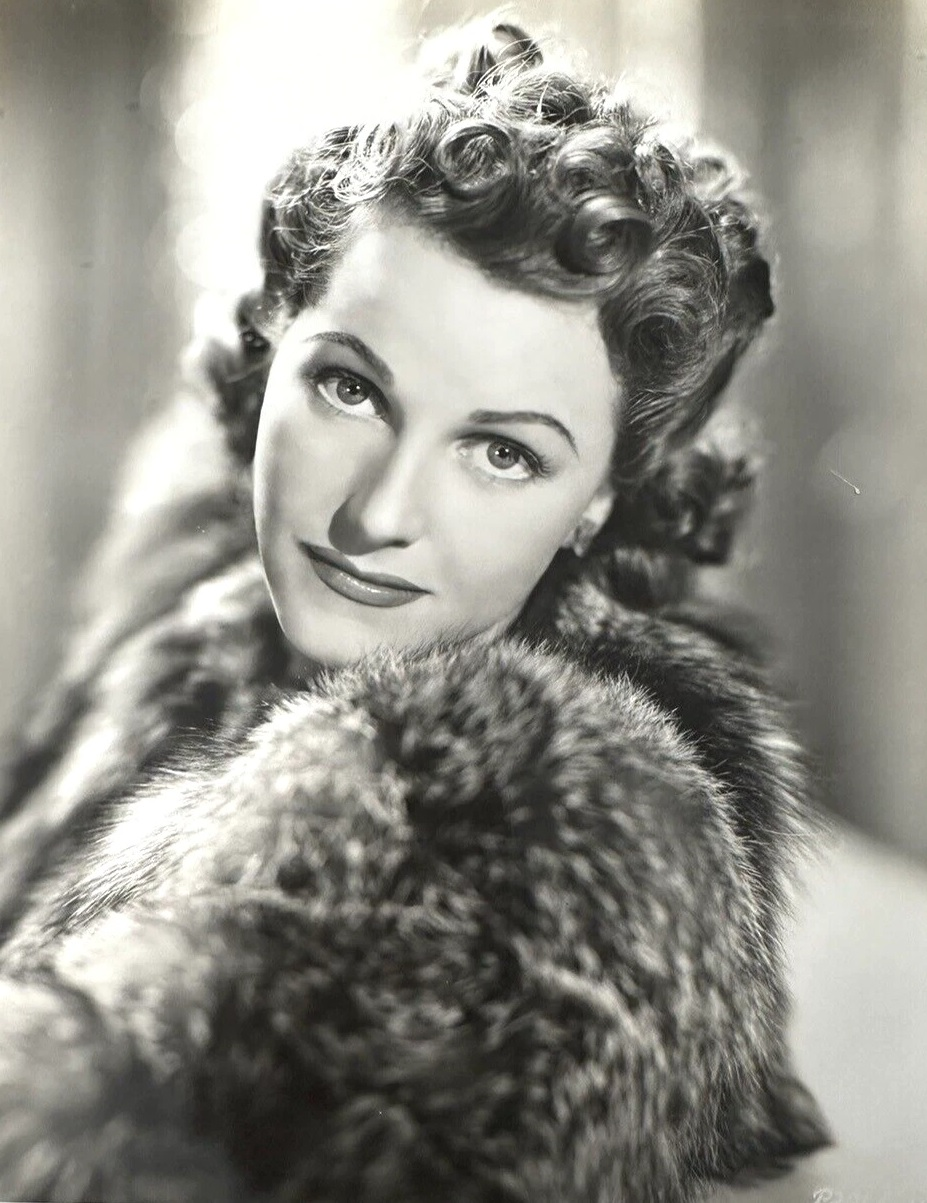
- Stewart in 1941
- Born: February 2, 1913; Chicago, Illinois, U.S.
- Died: July 4, 2007 (aged 94); Rancho Bernardo, California, U.S.
- Occupations: Film, voice actress
- Years active: 1930s – 1940s
- Spouse(s): Les Paterson (1944-?); Maurice Greiner (1991-2007) (her death)
- Children: 1

Eleanor Stewart (February 2, 1913 – July 4, 2007), was an American film actress of the 1930s and 1940s, appearing mostly in Western films.

== Biography ==
Born in Chicago, Stewart attended Northwestern University. She worked as a model, and after winning a talent contest she moved to Hollywood in the mid-1930s. Initially on contract with MGM, she eventually worked freelance for various studios, starring often as the heroine opposite Bob Steele, Tex Ritter, Jack Randall, Bob Custer, Ken Maynard and Tom Keene, among others. She is probably best known for her role in the serial The Fighting Devil Dogs, which was released throughout 1938. During the 1940s she did three Hopalong Cassidy films.

During World War II, she was a Gray Lady volunteer at the Veterans Administration Hospital in Los Angeles.

She was also a voice actor and a writer. She was the author of A Fair Vision, a book about the Pilgrims. Her career spanned a total of thirty six films.

Retiring from film in the 1940s, her last role of the era was in the 1944 Hopalong Cassidy film Mystery Man. She had no acting roles until 1979, when she played a small role in the film The Orphan.

== Personal life ==
Twice married, she had one child, a daughter, Karen Peterson, from her first marriage to MGM publicity man Les Peterson. Her second marriage was to Maurice Greiner, from 1991 until her death.

== Partial filmography ==
- The Gun Ranger (1936)
- Headin' for the Rio Grande (1936)
- Red Lights Ahead (1936)
- Headline Crasher (1936)
- Where Trails Divide (1937)
- Arizona Days (1937)
- Range Defenders (1937)
- The Rangers Step In (1937)
- Santa Fe Rides (1937)
- Trapped by G-Men (1937)
- The Fighting Devil Dogs (1938, serial)
- The Mexicali Kid (1938)
- The Painted Trail (1938)
- Rolling Caravans (1938)
- Stagecoach Days (1938)
- Flaming Lead (1939)
- Waterloo Bridge (1940)
- Pirates on Horseback (1941)
- Riders of the Timberline (1941)
- Men of San Quentin (1942)
- Silver Queen (1942)
- Mystery Man (1944)

== Death ==
On July 4, 2007, Stewart died in Rancho Bernardo, California, from complications of Alzheimer's disease, at the age of 94.
