= Defenders of the Law =

1931 film

- Directed by: Joseph Levering
- Written by: Hampton Del Ruth; Louis E. Heifetz
- Produced by: Larry Darmour; W. Ray Johnston
- Starring: Catherine Dale Owen; John Holland; Robert Gleckler
- Cinematography: James S. Brown Jr.
- Edited by: Dwight Caldwell
- Music by: Lee Zahler
- Production company: Larry Darmour Productions
- Distributed by: Continental Talking Pictures
- Release date: May 24, 1931
- Running time: 64 minutes
- Country: United States
- Language: English

Defenders of the Law is a 1931 American pre-Code crime film directed by Joseph Levering and starring Catherine Dale Owen, John Holland and Robert Gleckler.

== Plot ==
A cop goes undercover to infiltrate a gang with strong political connections.

== Cast ==
- Catherine Dale Owen as Alice Randall
- John Holland as Police Captain Bill Houston
- Robert Gleckler as Joe Velet aka Phil Terry
- Edmund Breese as Police Commander Randall
- Mae Busch as Mae Ward - Undercover Policewoman
- Paul Panzer as Taroni - Gang Leader
- Kit Guard as Kit - Velet's Chief Henchman
- Joseph W. Girard as The Police Chief
- Philo McCullough as Detecteive Tom Muldoon
- Al Cooke as Cookie - the Photographer
- Nick Thompson as Velet Henchman

== Bibliography ==
- Michael R. Pitts. Poverty Row Studios, 1929–1940: An Illustrated History of 55 Independent Film Companies, with a Filmography for Each. McFarland & Company, 2005.
