= Majestic Pictures =

American film production and distribution company active during the 1930s

Majestic Pictures was an American film production and distribution company active during the 1930s. Under the control of Larry Darmour, the company specialized in low-budget productions and was one of the more stable Poverty Row outfits during the period. It also gained a reputation for producing higher quality films than was common amongst similar studios, possibly due to a business arrangement the company had with the major studio MGM.

== History ==
The first film released by Majestic was the 1930 drama Today. In 1935, along with other studios such as Monogram and Chesterfield, Majestic was absorbed into Republic Pictures. The larger combine led by Herbert Yates aimed to dominate the low-budget field. Darmour grew unhappy with the arrangement and soon departed to resume producing in his own right.

== Filmography ==
- Today (1930)
- The Crusader (1932)
- Law and Lawless (1932)
- The Phantom Express (1932)
- Hearts of Humanity (1932)
- The Unwritten Law (1932)
- Gold (1932)
- Outlaw Justice (1932)
- The Crusader (1932)
- The Vampire Bat (1933)
- The World Gone Mad (1933)
- The Sin of Nora Moran (1933)
- Curtain at Eight (1933)
- Sing Sinner Sing (1933)
- Via Pony Express (1933)
- Cheating Blondes (1933)
- Gigolettes of Paris (1933)
- Trouble Busters (1933)
- Gun Law (1933)
- What Price Decency (1933)
- High Gear (1933)
- She Had to Choose (1934)
- Cheaters (1934)
- Night Alarm (1934)
- The Fighting Trooper (1934)
- Enlighten Thy Daughter (1934)
- Riding Speed (1934)
- Unknown Blonde (1934)
- The Scarlet Letter (1934)
- Fighting Lady (1935)
- Convention Girl (1935)
- What Price Crime (1935)
- Dizzy Dames (1935)
- Shadows of the Orient (1935)
- Reckless Roads (1935)
- Motive for Revenge (1935)
- Mutiny Ahead (1935)
- The Perfect Clue (1935)

== Bibliography ==
- Balio Tino. Grand Design: Hollywood as a Modern Business Entertprise 1930-1939. University of California Press, 1995.
- Pitts, Michael R. Poverty Row Studios, 1929–1940: An Illustrated History of 55 Independent Film Companies, with a Filmography for Each. McFarland & Company, 2005.
