= William Gould (actor) =

American actor

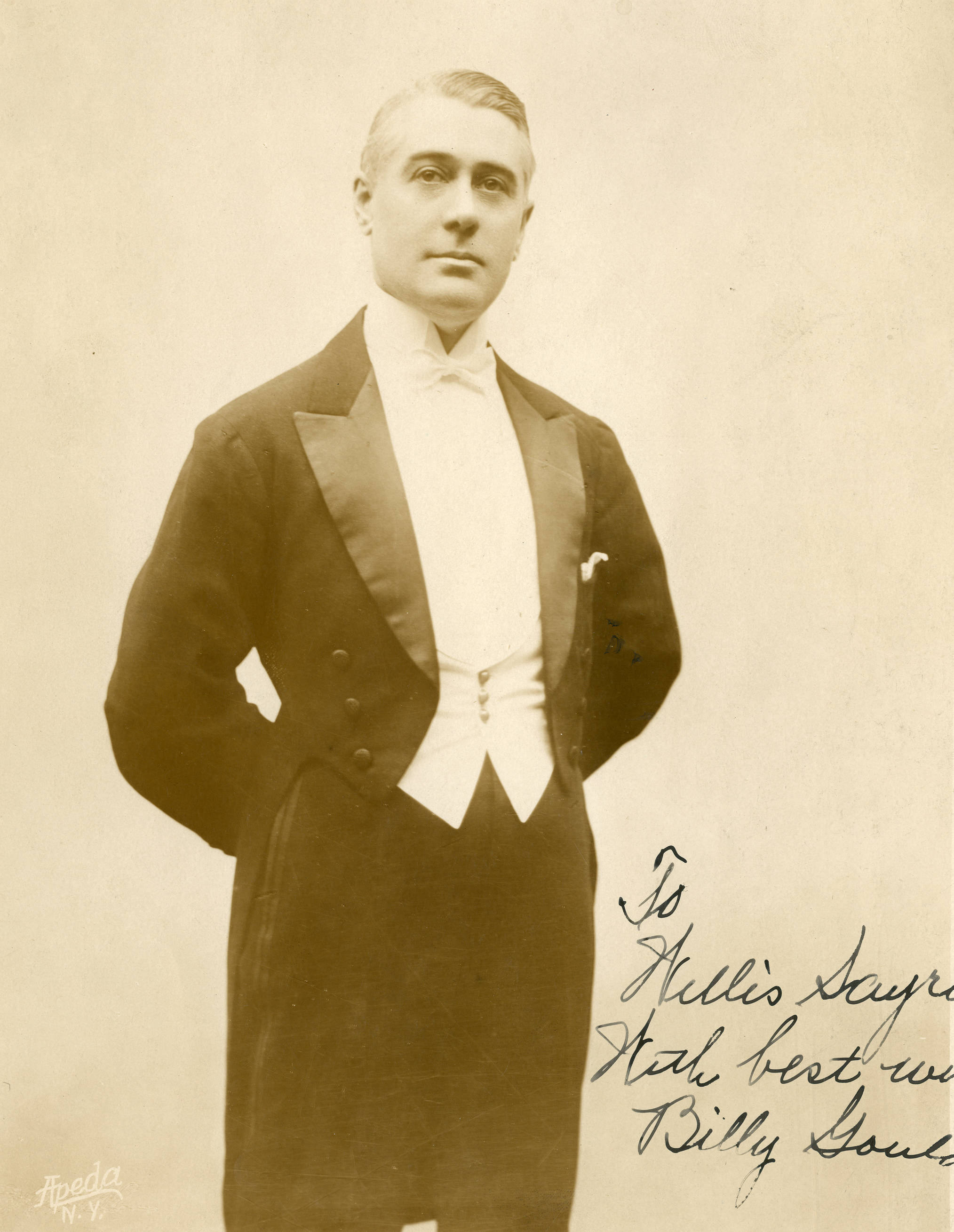
- Gould in 1911
- Born: May 2, 1886; Ontario, Canada
- Died: May 15, 1969 (aged 83); Long Beach, California, U.S.
- Occupation: Actor
- Years active: 1922-1953

William Gould (May 2, 1886 – May 15, 1969) was a Canadian-American film actor. He appeared in more than 240 films during his career. In films, Gould portrayed Jed Scott, a leader of homesteaders, in the serial The Lone Ranger Rides Again (1939) and Air Marshal Kragg in the serial Buck Rogers (1939).

== Selected filmography ==
- Saved by Radio (1922) - Spike Jones
- Back Fire (1922) - Steve Rollins
- Beasts of Paradise (1923)
- Flirting with Love (1924) - John Williams
- The Desert Outlaw (1924)
- Pride of Sunshine Alley (1924)
- The Red Lily (1924) - Arresting Detective (uncredited)
- The Riddle Rider (1924) - Jack Archer
- The Sunrise Trail (1931) - Joe - Card Player (uncredited)
- Heroes of the Flames (1931) - John Madison
- The Phantom (1931) - Dr. Weldon
- The Crowd Roars (1932) - Track Doctor (uncredited)
- Uptown New York (1932) - Police Desk Sergeant (uncredited)
- The Lost Special (1932, Serial) - Steele [Ch. 1] (uncredited)
- Phantom Thunderbolt (1933) - Red Matthews
- The Trail Drive (1933) - Honest John
- Gun Justice (1933) - Jones
- The Richest Girl in the World (1934) (uncredited)
- Loser's End (1935)
- Swifty (1935)
- Desert Guns (1936)
- Chatterbox (1936)
- Shakedown (1936)
- Ranger Courage (1936)
- The Unknown Ranger (1936)
- Desert Justice (1936)
- Wild Horse Rodeo (1937) - Harkley
- Hoosier Schoolboy (1937) - John Matthew, Sr.
- Prescription for Romance (1937)
- The Purple Vigilantes (1938)
- The Gladiator (1938) (uncredited)
- Mr. Wong, Detective (1938)
- The Lone Ranger Rides Again (1939)
- Buck Rogers (1939)
- Nancy Drew and the Hidden Staircase (1939)
- Dr. Christian Meets the Women (1940)
- Lightning Strikes West (1940)
- Nobody's Children (1940)
- No Greater Sin (1941)
- The Man Who Lost Himself (1941)
- Never Give a Sucker an Even Break (1941) (uncredited)
- Saboteur (1942) - Stranger on Sidewalk (uncredited)
- Tramp, Tramp, Tramp (1942)
- Saddle Leather Law (1944)
- Messenger of Peace (1947)
- Lady at Midnight (1948)
- Guns of the Timberland (1960) - Dr. Evans (uncredited)
- Wakakute warukute sugoi koitsura (1962) - O. H. Smith

== Television ==
- Appeared in a 1950 TV episode of The Lone Ranger entitled "Buried Treasure (1950)
