= Roaring Timber =

1937 film by Phil Rosen

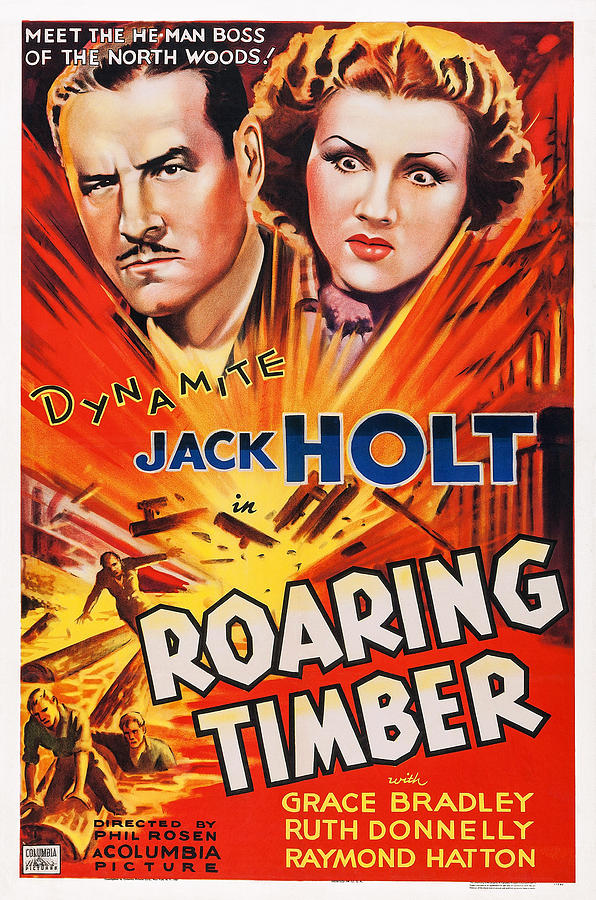
- Poster for the film
- Directed by: Phil Rosen
- Screenplay by: Paul Franklin; Robert James Cosgriff
- Story by: Robert James Cosgriff
- Produced by: Rudolph Flothow
- Starring: Jack Holt
- Cinematography: James S. Brown Jr.
- Edited by: Dwight Caldwell
- Production company: Larry Darmour Productions
- Distributed by: Columbia Pictures
- Release date: July 4, 1937 (US)
- Running time: 65 minutes
- Country: United States
- Language: English

Roaring Timber is a 1937 American adventure film directed by Phil Rosen and starring Jack Holt.

== Cast ==
- Jack Holt as Jim Sherwood
- Grace Bradley as Kay MacKinley
- Ruth Donnelly as Aunt Mary
- Raymond Hatton as Tennessee
- Willard Robertson as Harrigan
- J. Farrell MacDonald as Andrew MacKinley
- Charles Wilson as Sam Garvin
- Ernest Wood as Slim Bagnell
- Philip Ahn as Ah Sing, also known as Crooner
- Fred Kohler Jr. as Curley
