= Gordon Rigby =

American screenwriter

- Born: August 7, 1897; Los Angeles, United States
- Died: July 11, 1975 (aged 77); Los Angeles
- Occupation: Screenwriter
- Years active: 1921-1948

Gordon Rigby (August 7, 1897 – July 11, 1975) was an American screenwriter. He wrote for more than 40 films between 1921 and 1948. He was born and died in Los Angeles.

== Partial filmography ==
- What Love Will Do (1921)
- Hearts Aflame (1923)
- Dark Stairways (1924)
- Adventure (1925)
- The Blue Eagle (1926)
- Black Paradise (1926)
- The Family Upstairs (1926)
- Honesty – The Best Policy (1926)
- Rustling for Cupid (1926)
- Whispering Wires (1926)
- The Frontiersman (1927)
- Nevada (1927)
- The Grain of Dust (1928)
- The Toilers (1928)
- Tiger Rose (1929)
- The Woman I Love (1929)
- Mammy (1930)
- Under a Texas Moon (1930)
- Song of the Flame (1930)
- Happy Landing (1934)
- The Wrong Road (1937)
- Flight into Nowhere (1938)
- The Strange Case of Dr. Meade (1938)
- Reformatory (1938)
- Whispering Enemies (1939)
- Trapped in the Sky (1939)
- Sing, Dance, Plenty Hot (1948)
