= Kit Guard =

Danish-American actor (1894–1961)

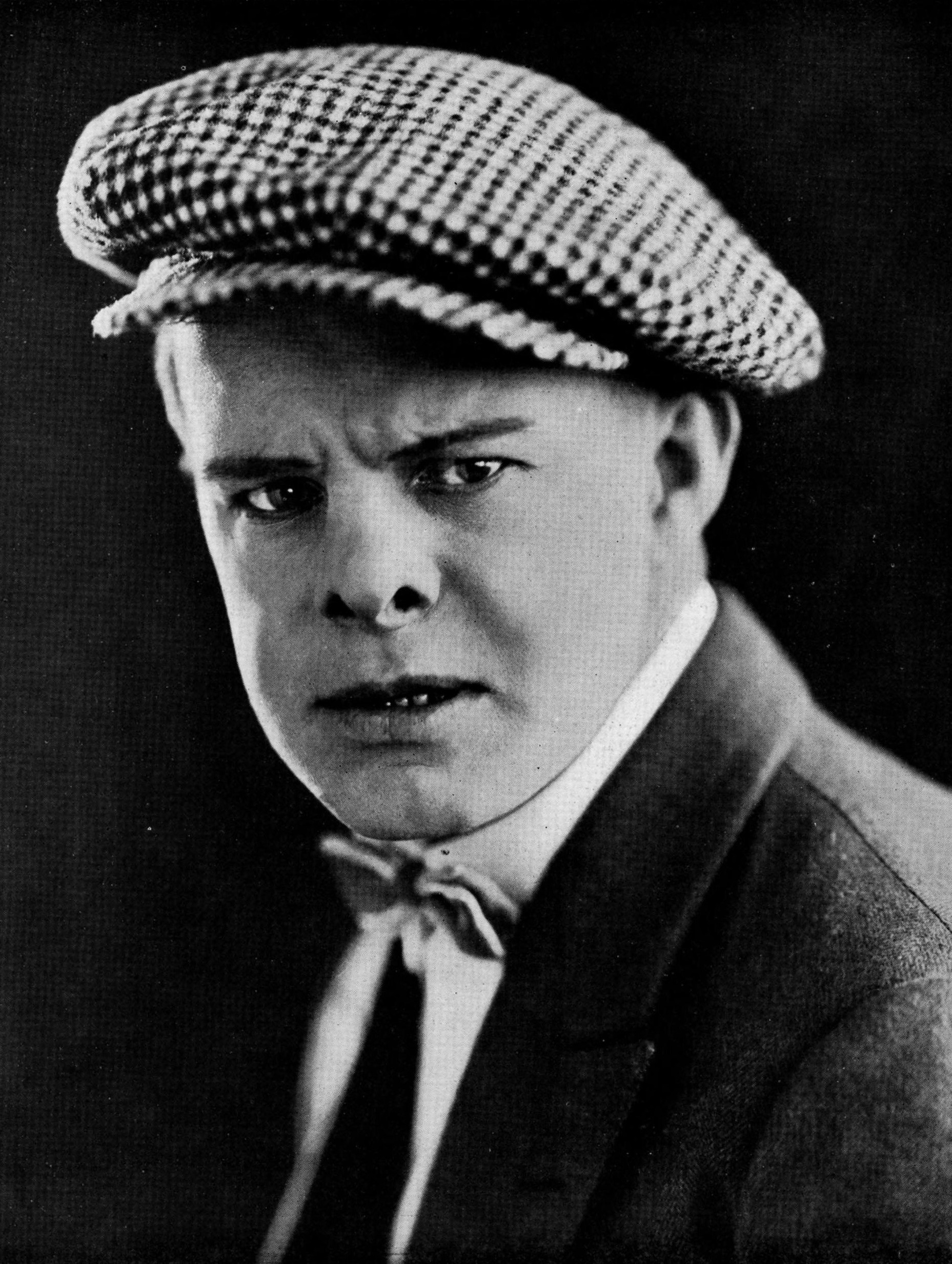
- Kit Guard, pictured in 1923
- Born: Christen Klitgaard; May 5, 1894; Hals, Denmark
- Died: July 18, 1961 (aged 67); Woodland Hills, Los Angeles, California, U.S.
- Occupation: Actor
- Years active: 1923–1957

Kit Guard (born Christen Klitgaard May 5, 1894 - July 18, 1961) was a Danish-American actor whose career started in the 1920s.

In the sound era, Guard would often be cast in supporting roles as “a small-time hood.”

== Biography ==
Guard left his birthplace of Hals, Denmark, around the turn of the 20th century, one of five brothers to do so. He moved to San Francisco, and in 1913 he became assistant stage manager and actor at the Alcazar Theatre there. He later acted on stage at the Wigwam Theatre in San Francisco. During World War I, he entertained troops overseas in France and England and later served in the Rainbow Division of the U. S. Army.

Guard made his sound film debut with The Racketeer (1929), in the role of a small-time criminal, a social type he would often play. He was a prolific performer, appearing in over 400 films. He appeared with Al Cooke as a comic duo in a number of films from 1923 to 1927 and briefly reuniting in 1931 to co-star in the low-budget Defenders of the Law with Mae Busch.

Most of his 30 feature films in which he appeared were decidedly low-budget, poverty row projects. However, Guard had a few small roles in higher profile movies, such as Frank Capra’s It Happened One Night (1935) as a bus passenger and You Can't Take It With You (1938) as prison inmate, though neither role was credited. Kit Guard’s final role was in Paramount Picture’s The Joker Is Wild (1957), in which he plays a doorman.

Guard died of cancer at the Picture Country House and Hospital in Woodland Hills on July 18, 1961, aged 67.

== Selected filmography ==
- The Patent Leather Pug (1925)
- Her Father Said No (1927)
- Two Fisted Justice (1931)
- The Final Edition (1932)
- The Last Man (1932)
- Her Forgotten Past (1933)
- Before Midnight (1933)
- Rip Roaring Riley (1935)
- Paroled from the Big House (1938)
- Frontiers of '49 (1939)
