= Trapped by G-Men =

1937 film by Lewis D. Collins

- Directed by: Lewis D. Collins
- Written by: Tom Kilpatrick
- Starring: Jack Holt; Wynne Gibson; C. Henry Gordon
- Production company: Columbia Pictures
- Release date: 1937
- Running time: 65 minutes
- Country: United States
- Language: English

Trapped by G-Men is a 1937 American crime film directed by Lewis D. Collins and starring Jack Holt, Wynne Gibson, and C. Henry Gordon.

== Cast ==
- Jack Holt as Martin Galloway
- Wynne Gibson as Alice Segar
- C. Henry Gordon as Kilgour
- Jack La Rue as Fred Drake
- Edward Brophy as Lefty
- William Pawley as Harry Grady
- Arthur Hohl as Blackie
- Robert Emmett O'Connor as Agent Jim
- William Bakewell as Dick Withers
- Eleanor Stewart as Nancy Higbee
