= Robert Allen (actor) =

American actor (1906–1998)

- Robert Allen in 1938
- Born: Irvine E. Theodore Baehr; March 28, 1906; Mount Vernon, New York, U.S.
- Died: October 9, 1998 (aged 92); Oyster Bay, New York, U.S.
- Resting place: Locust Valley Cemetery, Locust Valley, New York, U.S.
- Occupation: Actor
- Years active: 1919–1986
- Spouses: Frances Cookman (m. 1964) Evelyn Peirce (m. 1934; died 1960)
- Children: 2, including Ted Baehr

Robert Allen (born Irvine E. Theodore Baehr, March 28, 1906 – October 9, 1998) was an American actor in both feature films and B-movie westerns between 1935 and 1944.

== Biography ==
Allen's first notable role was the male lead in Love Me Forever (1935), for which he won a Box Office Award.

After the departure of cowboy star Ken Maynard, Allen was plugged into producer Larry Darmour's formulaic Ranger pictures. Along with sidekick Wally Wales (played by Hal Taliaferro), he redefined the role, starring in six films for director Spencer Gordon Bennet in that 1937. The star was billed as Bob Allen. However, the great success of Wild Bill Elliott in Columbia's 1938 serial The Adventures of Wild Bill Hickok prompted Columbia to drop Bob Allen and replace him with Elliott.

Allen continued to work in pictures as Robert Allen or Robert "Tex" Allen. He had acted on Broadway in the original productions of Show Boat and Kiss Them for Me. In 1956, he appeared in the original production of Auntie Mame. He appeared in other Broadway plays, in touring productions, soap operas, documentaries and commercials. He became a real estate broker in 1964 and returned to the stage from time to time, including an appearance as J.B. Biggley in the 1972 Equity Library Theatre revival of How to Succeed in Business Without Really Trying.

== Family ==
Allen was married twice; the first was to movie actress Evelyn Peirce until her death in 1960. They had two children. Their son, Ted Baehr (born 1946) is a prominent Christian minister and media critic. They also had a daughter, Katherine Meyer.

Allen died on October 9, 1998, age 92, of complications from cancer in Oyster Bay, New York. He was survived by his son and daughter, seven grandchildren and eight great-grandchildren.

== Partial filmography ==
- The Reckless Hour (1931)
- Saturday's Millions (1933)
- Menace (1934)
- Jealousy (1934)
- The Black Room Mystery (1935)
- Law Beyond the Range (1935)
- Death Flies East (1935)
- Guard That Girl (1935)
- I'll Love You Always (1935)
- Fighting Shadows (1935)
- Air Hawks (1935)
- The Revenge Rider (1935)
- Crime and Punishment (1935)
- White Lies (1935)
- Party Wire (1935)
- Love Me Forever (1935)
- I'm a Father (1935)
- The Life of Lafayette (1936)
- Lady of Secrets (1936)
- Craig's Wife (1936)
- The Unknown Ranger (1936)
- Pride of the Marines (1936)
- The Awful Truth (1937)
- Law of the Ranger (1937)
- Let's Get Married (1937)
- The Big Broadcast of 1938 (1937)
- Penitentiary (1938)
- Keep Smiling (1938)
- Everybody's Baby (1938)
- Up the River (1938)
- Meet the Girls (1938)
- Fighting Thoroughbreds (1939)
- Winter Carnival (1939)
- Winner Take All (1939)
- The Web (1947)
- Terror in the City (1964)
- Naked Evil (1966)
- Hells Angels on Wheels (1967)
- Dirtymouth (1970)
- Raiders of the Living Dead (1986)
