= Joseph Levering =

American actor

- Born: July 20, 1874; Columbus, Indiana, United States
- Died: August 27, 1943 (aged 69); Kansas City, Missouri, United States
- Occupations: Actor, writer, director
- Years active: 1911–1940 (film)

Joseph Levering (1874–1943) was an American actor, screenwriter and film director. He was married to the actress Marian Swayne.

== Selected filmography ==
=== Director ===
- The Little American (1917)
- Little Miss Fortune (1917)
- The Little Samaritan (1917)
- The Road Between (1917)
- His Temporary Wife (1920)
- Determination (1922)
- Flesh and Spirit (1922)
- The Tie That Binds (1923)
- Who's Cheating? (1924)
- Lilies of the Streets (1925)
- Unrestrained Youth (1925)
- Defenders of the Law (1931)
- Sea Devils (1931)
- Cheating Blondes (1933)
- Rolling Caravans (1938)
- Stagecoach Days (1938)
- Pioneer Trail (1938)
- In Early Arizona (1938)
- Phantom Gold (1938)
- The Law Comes to Texas (1939)
- Frontiers of '49 (1939)
- Lone Star Pioneers (1939)

=== Actor ===
- Brennan of the Moor (1913)
- Shadows of the Moulin Rouge (1913)
- The Temptations of Satan (1914)

=== Writer ===
- Riders of the Frontier (1939)

== Bibliography ==
- Michael R. Pitts. Poverty Row Studios, 1929–1940: An Illustrated History of 55 Independent Film Companies, with a Filmography for Each. McFarland & Company, 2005.
