= Lee Zahler =

American composer

- Born: August 14, 1893; New York City
- Died: February 21, 1947 (aged 53); Hollywood, California
- Spouse: Rose Rosenberg Zahler
- Children: 1

Lee Zahler (born Leo Zahler, August 14, 1893 – February 21, 1947) was an American composer and musical director of films, starting in the 1920s and well into the 1940s.

== Career ==
Songwriter and orchestrator Zahler provided both the musical score and an original theme song for the first talking serial, The King of the Kongo, produced by Mascot Pictures in 1929. Zahler was then hired by independent producer Larry Darmour as musical director for the Darmour studio. Beginning in 1936 Darmour began releasing his productions through Columbia Pictures, and Zahler remained with Darmour until Darmour's death in 1942.

Columbia retained Lee Zahler's services, and he continued to compose music for Columbia serials. Zahler's agitato scores for Holt of the Secret Service (1941) and Batman (1943) are perhaps most familiar to serial fans. The only Columbia serial of the 1940s that didn't involve Lee Zahler was Brenda Starr, Reporter (1945); it was produced by Sam Katzman at the Monogram Pictures plant, with the music conducted by Monogram's musical director Edward J. Kay.

In 1944 Lee Zahler became a musical director for the PRC studio, where he furnished the music for 26 feature films through 1946. Then he became head of the music department for independent producer Edward Finney; Zahler scored Finney's feature Queen of the Amazons (1946). Lee Zahler died on February 21, 1947; his last film was the Columbia serial Jack Armstrong (1947).

== Personal life ==
Lee Zahler's life took a devastating turn in 1940 when his 14-year-old son Gordon was seriously injured in a high-school-gymnastics accident. Gordon broke his neck and became paralyzed from the neck down, and his father was determined to pay any and all medical expenses. This forced the Zahler family into debt and ultimately cost the elder Zahler his marriage.

After Lee Zahler's death, Gordon Zahler turned the family finances around by repurposing his father's music for the new field of television. Over many years, Lee Zahler had accumulated a library of hundreds of musical themes, with appropriate music for any occasion. This library passed to Gordon, whose Zahler Music Library profitably sold stock music for TV productions including The Adventures of Wild Bill Hickok, Cavalcade of America, Private Secretary, Your Funny, Funny Films, The New 3 Stooges, and Underdog. As late as 1975 Lee Zahler was still getting screen credit (for the Al Adamson western tribute Blazing Stewardesses).

== Selected filmography ==
- King of the Kongo (1929)
- Dark Skies (1929)
- Air Eagles (1931)
- Defenders of the Law (1931)
- Love Bound (1932)
- Behind Jury Doors (1932)
- The Man from Arizona (1932)
- Cannonball Express (1932)
- Dance Girl Dance (1933)
- The Flaming Signal (1933)
- The Big Bluff (1933)
- Revenge at Monte Carlo (1933)
- Secret Sinners (1933)
- The Woman Who Dared (1933)
- Cheating Blondes (1933)
- Her Splendid Folly (1933)
- The Fugitive (1933)
- The Trail Beyond (1934)
- Frontier Days (1934)
- Ticket to a Crime (1934)
- When Lightning Strikes (1934)
- The Perfect Clue (1935)
- Adventurous Knights (1935)
- The Man from Guntown (1935)
- Western Courage (1935)
- Mutiny Ahead (1935)
- Skybound (1935)
- The Last of the Clintons (1935)
- Circus Shadows (1935)
- Everyman's Law (1936)
- Rio Grande Ranger (1936)
- Idaho Kid (1936)
- The Speed Reporter (1936)
- The Lion's Den (1936)
- The Fugitive Sheriff (1936)
- Desert Justice (1936)
- Under Suspicion (1937)
- Heroes of the Alamo (1937)
- Reformatory (1938)
- The Strange Case of Dr. Meade (1938)
- Whispering Enemies (1939)
- Frontiers of '49 (1939)
- Passport to Alcatraz (1940)
- Fugitive from a Prison Camp (1940)
- The Great Swindle (1941)
- Girls' Town (1942)
- The Underdog (1943)
- I Accuse My Parents (1944)
- The Lady Confesses (1945)
- The Monster and the Ape (1945)
- Outlaws of the Plains (1946)
- Jack Armstrong (1947, last film)
