= Dwight Caldwell =

American film editor

- Born: February 2, 1902; Columbus, Ohio, United States
- Died: November 25, 1981 (aged 79); Los Angeles, California, United States
- Occupation: Editor
- Years active: 1931–1962 (film & TV)

Dwight Caldwell (1902–1981) was an American film editor. He worked on more than a hundred productions, including several serials, mainly at Majestic Pictures and Columbia Pictures.

== Selected filmography ==
- Sea Devils (1931)
- The Mystery Train (1931)
- Defenders of the Law (1931)
- Air Eagles (1931)
- Cheating Blondes (1933)
- Night Alarm (1934)
- Shadows of the Orient (1935)
- Motive for Revenge (1935)
- The Perfect Clue (1935)
- Mutiny Ahead (1935)
- Reckless Roads (1935)
- Western Courage (1935)
- The Cattle Thief (1936)
- North of Nome (1936)
- Rio Grande Ranger (1936)
- Heroes of the Range (1936)
- Ranger Courage (1936)
- The Unknown Ranger (1936)
- The Fugitive Sheriff (1936)
- Roaring Timber (1937)
- Under Suspicion (1937)
- Reformatory (1938)
- Phantom Gold (1938)
- Pioneer Trail (1938)
- Hidden Power (1939)
- Frontiers of '49 (1939)
- Fugitive at Large (1939)
- Fugitive from a Prison Camp (1940)
- Passport to Alcatraz (1940)
- The Great Swindle (1941)
- The Crime Doctor's Strangest Case (1943)
- Shadows in the Night (1944)
- The Crime Doctor's Courage (1945)
- Crime Doctor's Warning (1945)
- Voice of the Whistler (1945)
- Just Before Dawn (1946)
- Mysterious Intruder (1946)
- Crime Doctor's Man Hunt (1946)
- The Secret of the Whistler (1946)
- The Crime Doctor's Gamble (1947)
- The Millerson Case (1947)
- The Thirteenth Hour (1947)
- Key Witness (1947)
- The Return of the Whistler (1948)
- Trapped by Boston Blackie (1948)
- Top Gun (1955)
- The Three Outlaws (1956)
- Frontier Gambler (1956)

== Bibliography ==
- Michael R. Pitts. Poverty Row Studios, 1929–1940: An Illustrated History of 55 Independent Film Companies, with a Filmography for Each. McFarland & Company, 2005.
