= List of American films of 1931 =

American films released in 1931

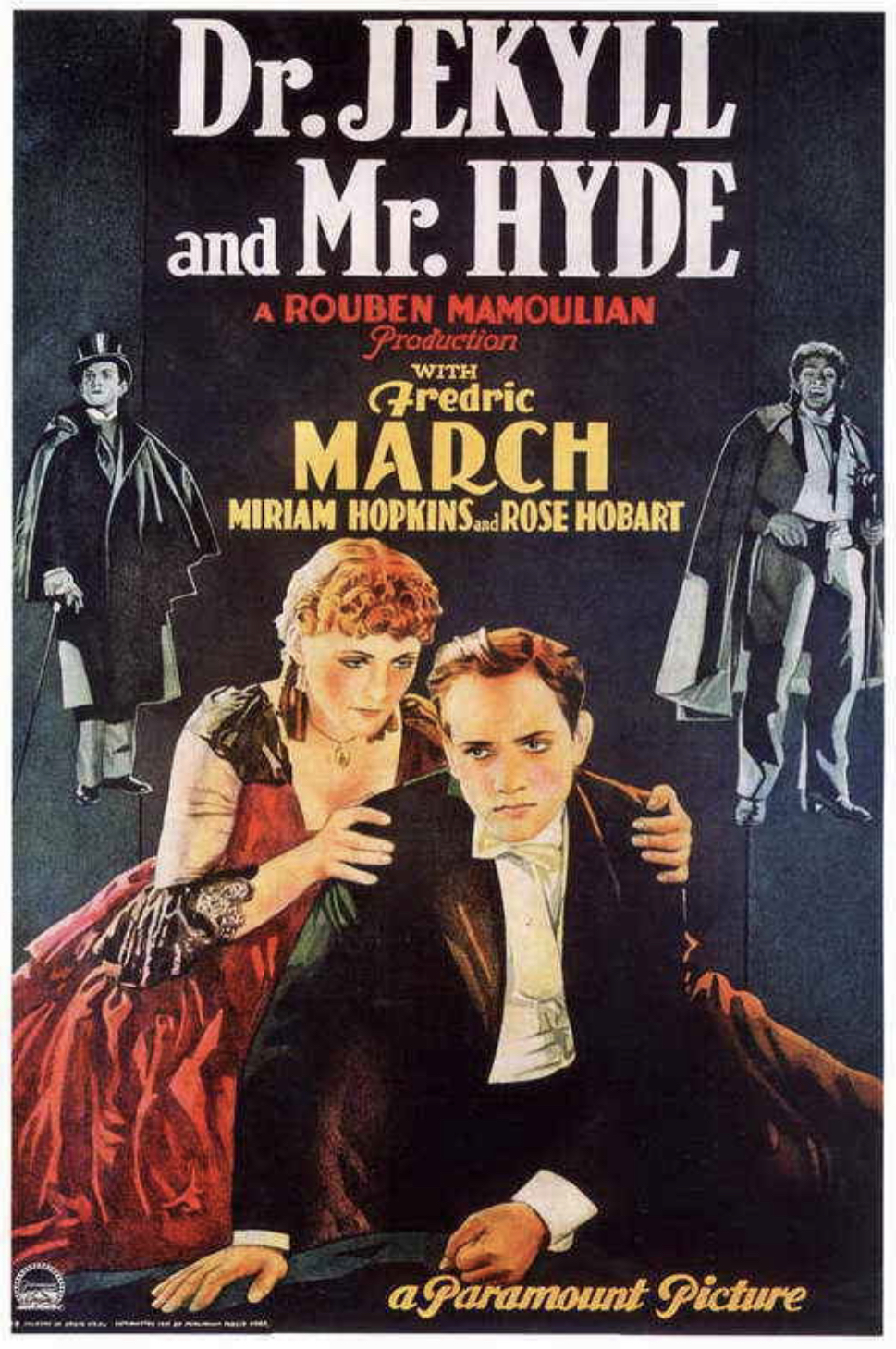
Dr. Jekyll and Mr. Hyde starring Fredric March.

More than 500 American feature films were released in 1931. All had at least a synchronized musical score.
Cimarron won Best Picture at the Academy Awards.

== A–B ==
Title	Director	Cast	Genre	Notes
The Age for Love	Frank Lloyd	Billie Dove, Edward Everett Horton, Lois Wilson	Comedy	United Artists
Air Eagles	Phil Whitman	Lloyd Hughes, Norman Kerry, Shirley Grey	Adventure	Independent
Air Police	Stuart Paton	Kenneth Harlan, Josephine Dunn, Richard Cramer	Crime	Independent
Alexander Hamilton	John G. Adolfi	George Arliss, Doris Kenyon, Montagu Love	Drama	Warner Bros.
Alias the Bad Man	Phil Rosen	Ken Maynard, Virginia Brown Faire, Frank Mayo	Western	Tiffany
Alice in Wonderland	Bud Pollard	Ruth Gilbert, Leslie King, Ralph Hertz	Fantasy	Independent
Aloha	Albert S. Rogell	Ben Lyon, Raquel Torres, Thelma Todd	Drama	Tiffany
Always Goodbye	Kenneth MacKenna, William Cameron Menzies	Elissa Landi, Paul Cavanagh, Lewis Stone	Drama	Fox Film
Ambassador Bill	Sam Taylor	Will Rogers, Marguerite Churchill, Greta Nissen	Comedy	Fox Film
An American Tragedy	Josef von Sternberg	Sylvia Sidney, Phillips Holmes, Frances Dee	Drama	Paramount
Annabelle's Affairs	Alfred L. Werker	Victor McLaglen, Jeanette MacDonald, Roland Young	Comedy	Fox Film
Anybody's Blonde	Frank R. Strayer	Dorothy Revier, Reed Howes, Edna Murphy	Mystery	Independent
Are These Our Children?	Wesley Ruggles	Eric Linden, Rochelle Hudson, Ben Alexander	Drama	RKO
Are You There?	Hamilton MacFadden	Beatrice Lillie, John Garrick, Olga Baclanova	Comedy	Fox Film
Arizona	George B. Seitz	Laura La Plante, John Wayne, June Clyde	Drama	Columbia
Arizona Terror	Phil Rosen	Ken Maynard, Lina Basquette, Hooper Atchley	Western	Tiffany
Arrowsmith	John Ford	Ronald Colman, Helen Hayes, Myrna Loy	Drama	United Artists
The Avenger	Roy William Neill	Buck Jones, Dorothy Revier, Otto Hoffman	Western	Columbia
Bachelor Apartment	Lowell Sherman	Irene Dunne, Lowell Sherman, Mae Murray	Comedy	RKO
The Bachelor Father	Robert Z. Leonard	Marion Davies, Ralph Forbes, C. Aubrey Smith	Comedy	MGM
Bad Company	Tay Garnett	Helen Twelvetrees, Ricardo Cortez, John Garrick	Crime	RKO
Bad Girl	Frank Borzage	Sally Eilers, James Dunn, Minna Gombell	Drama	Fox Film
Bad Sister	Hobart Henley	Conrad Nagel, Bette Davis, Humphrey Bogart	Drama	Universal
The Bargain	Robert Milton	Evalyn Knapp, Lewis Stone, Doris Kenyon	Drama	Warner Bros.
Beau Ideal	Herbert Brenon	Ralph Forbes, Loretta Young, Irene Rich	Adventure	RKO
Behind Office Doors	Melville W. Brown	Mary Astor, Ricardo Cortez, Catherine Dale Owen	Drama	RKO
The Beloved Bachelor	Lloyd Corrigan	Paul Lukas, Dorothy Jordan, Vivienne Osborne	Drama	Paramount
Beyond Victory	John S. Robertson	Bill Boyd, James Gleason, Marion Shilling	War	RKO
Big Business Girl	William A. Seiter	Loretta Young, Frank Albertson, Ricardo Cortez	Romance	Warner Bros.
The Big Gamble	Fred Niblo	William Boyd, James Gleason, June MacCloy	Drama	RKO
The Big Shot	Ralph Murphy	Eddie Quillan, Maureen O'Sullivan, Mary Nolan	Comedy	RKO
The Black Camel	Hamilton MacFadden	Warner Oland, Sally Eilers, Bela Lugosi	Drama, Crime	Fox Film
Blonde Crazy	Roy Del Ruth	James Cagney, Joan Blondell, Ray Milland	Comedy	Warner Bros.
Body and Soul	Alfred Santell	Charles Farrell, Elissa Landi, Humphrey Bogart	Action	Fox Film
Border Law	Louis King	Buck Jones, Jim Mason, Lupita Tovar	Western	Columbia
Born to Love	Paul L. Stein	Joel McCrea, Constance Bennett, Paul Cavanagh	Drama	RKO
Bought	Archie Mayo	Constance Bennett, Ben Lyon, Ray Milland	Drama	Warner Bros.
Branded	D. Ross Lederman	Buck Jones, Wallace MacDonald, Philo McCullough	Western	Columbia
Branded Men	Phil Rosen	Ken Maynard, June Clyde, Irving Bacon	Western	Tiffany
The Brat	John Ford	Sally O'Neil, Alan Dinehart, Virginia Cherrill	Comedy	Fox Film
Broadminded	Mervyn LeRoy	Joe E. Brown, Marjorie White, Bela Lugosi	Comedy	Warner Bros.

== C-D ==
Title	Director	Cast	Genre	Notes
Captain Applejack	Hobart Henley	Mary Brian, John Halliday, Claud Allister	Drama	Warner Bros.
Caught	Edward Sloman	Richard Arlen, Louise Dresser, Frances Dee	Western	Paramount
Caught Cheating	Frank R. Strayer	George Sidney, Charles Murray, Dorothy Christy	Comedy	Tiffany
Caught Plastered	William A. Seiter	Bert Wheeler, Robert Woolsey, Dorothy Lee	Comedy	RKO
Cavalier of the West	John P. McCarthy	Harry Carey, Carmen Laroux, Kane Richmond	Western	Independent
The Champ	King Vidor	Wallace Beery, Jackie Cooper, Irene Rich	Drama	MGM
Chances	Allan Dwan	Douglas Fairbanks Jr., Rose Hobart, Anthony Bushell	War	Warner Bros.
Charlie Chan Carries On	Hamilton MacFadden	Warner Oland, John Garrick, Marguerite Churchill	Mystery	Fox Film
The Cheat	George Abbott	Tallulah Bankhead, Harvey Stephens, Irving Pichel	Drama	Paramount
The Cheyenne Cyclone	Armand Schaefer	Lane Chandler, Marie Quillan, Frankie Darro	Western	Independent
Children of Dreams	Alan Crosland	Tom Patricola, Marion Byron, Charles Winninger	Musical	Warner Bros.
Chinatown After Dark	Stuart Paton	Carmel Myers, Rex Lease, Barbara Kent	Crime, Drama	Independent
Cimarron	Wesley Ruggles	Irene Dunne, Richard Dix, Estelle Taylor	Drama, Western	RKO
The Cisco Kid	Irving Cummings	Warner Baxter, Edmund Lowe, Conchita Montenegro	Western	Fox Film
City Lights	Charles Chaplin	Charles Chaplin, Virginia Cherrill, Florence Lee	Comedy, Drama	United Artists
City Streets	Rouben Mamoulian	Gary Cooper, Sylvia Sidney, Paul Lukas	Drama, Crime	Paramount
Clearing the Range	Otto Brower	Hoot Gibson, Sally Eilers, Hooper Atchley	Western	Independent
Command Performance	Walter Lang	Neil Hamilton, Una Merkel, Helen Ware	Drama	Tiffany
The Common Law	Paul L. Stein	Constance Bennett, Joel McCrea, Hedda Hopper	Drama	RKO
Compromised	John G. Adolfi	Rose Hobart, Ben Lyon, Claude Gillingwater	Drama	Warner Bros.
Confessions of a Co-Ed	Dudley Murphy	Phillips Holmes, Sylvia Sidney, Claudia Dell	Drama	Paramount
A Connecticut Yankee	David Butler	Will Rogers, Maureen O'Sullivan, Myrna Loy	Comedy	Fox Film
The Conquering Horde	Edward Sloman	Richard Arlen, Fay Wray, Claude Gillingwater	Western	Paramount
Consolation Marriage	Paul Sloane	Irene Dunne, Pat O'Brien, Myrna Loy	Drama	RKO
Convicted	Christy Cabanne	Aileen Pringle, Jameson Thomas, Dorothy Christy	Mystery	Independent
Corsair	Roland West	Chester Morris, Thelma Todd, Fred Kohler	Crime	United Artists
Cracked Nuts	Edward F. Cline	Bert Wheeler, Dorothy Lee, Robert Woolsey	Comedy	RKO
The Criminal Code	Howard Hawks	Walter Huston, Constance Cummings, Boris Karloff	Crime; Drama	Columbia
The Cuban Love Song	W. S. Van Dyke	Lupe Vélez, Lawrence Tibbett, Jimmy Durante	Musical	MGM
Daddy Long Legs	Alfred Santell	Janet Gaynor, Warner Baxter, Una Merkel	Comedy	Fox Film
Damaged Love	Irvin Willat	June Collyer, Charles Starrett, Betty Garde	Drama	Independent
Dance, Fools, Dance	Harry Beaumont	Joan Crawford, Lester Vail, Clark Gable	Crime	MGM
Dancing Dynamite	Noel M. Smith	Richard Talmadge, Blanche Mehaffey, Robert Ellis	Crime	Independent
A Dangerous Affair	Edward Sedgwick	Jack Holt, Ralph Graves, Sally Blane	Mystery	Columbia
Daughter of the Dragon	Lloyd Corrigan	Anna May Wong, Warner Oland, Sessue Hayakawa	Drama	Paramount
Daybreak	Jacques Feyder	Ramon Novarro, Helen Chandler, Jean Hersholt	Drama	MGM
The Deadline	Lambert Hillyer	Buck Jones, Robert Ellis, G. Raymond Nye	Western	Columbia
The Deceiver	Louis King	Lloyd Hughes, Dorothy Sebastian, Natalie Moorhead	Mystery	Columbia
Defenders of the Law	Joseph Levering	Catherine Dale Owen, Edmund Breese, Mae Busch	Crime	Independent
Delicious	David Butler	Janet Gaynor, Charles Farrell, Virginia Cherrill	Musical	Fox Film
Desert Vengeance	Louis King	Buck Jones, Barbara Bedford, Douglas Gilmore	Western	Columbia
The Devil Plays	Richard Thorpe	Jameson Thomas, Dorothy Christy, Lillian Rich	Mystery	Chesterfield
Devotion	Robert Milton	Ann Harding, Leslie Howard, Robert Williams	Romance	RKO
Dirigible	Frank Capra	Jack Holt, Fay Wray, Ralph Graves	Adventure	Columbia
Dishonored	Josef von Sternberg	Marlene Dietrich, Victor McLaglen, Warner Oland	Drama, War	Paramount
Doctors' Wives	Frank Borzage	Warner Baxter, Joan Bennett, Victor Varconi	Drama	Fox Film
Don't Bet on Women	William K. Howard	Jeanette MacDonald, Edmund Lowe, Roland Young	Comedy	Fox Film
Dr. Jekyll and Mr. Hyde	Rouben Mamoulian	Fredric March, Miriam Hopkins, Rose Hobart	Drama, Horror	Paramount
Dracula	Tod Browning	Bela Lugosi, Helen Chandler, David Manners	Horror	Universal
Dragnet Patrol	Frank R. Strayer	Glenn Tryon, Vera Reynolds, Marjorie Beebe	Drama	Independent
The Drums of Jeopardy	George B. Seitz	Warner Oland, June Collyer, Hale Hamilton	Drama, Thriller	Tiffany
Dude Ranch	Frank Tuttle	Jack Oakie, Stuart Erwin, Eugene Pallette	Comedy	Paramount
Dugan of the Badlands	Robert N. Bradbury	Bill Cody, Blanche Mehaffey, Ethan Laidlaw	Western	Monogram

== E-F ==
Title	Director	Cast	Genre	Notes
The Easiest Way	Jack Conway	Constance Bennett, Adolphe Menjou, Clark Gable	Drama	MGM
East Lynne	Frank Lloyd	Ann Harding, Clive Brook, Conrad Nagel	Drama	Fox Film
East of Borneo	George Melford	Rose Hobart, Charles Bickford, Lupita Tovar	Adventure	Universal
Enemies of the Law	Lawrence C. Windom	Mary Nolan, Johnnie Walker, Lou Tellegen	Crime	Independent
Everything's Rosie	Clyde Bruckman	Robert Woolsey, Anita Louise, John Darrow	Comedy	RKO
Ex-Bad Boy	Vin Moore	Robert Armstrong, Jean Arthur	Comedy	Universal
Expensive Women	Hobart Henley	Dolores Costello, H. B. Warner	Drama	Warner Bros.
Fair Warning	Alfred L. Werker	George O'Brien, George Brent, Louise Huntington	Western	Fox Film
The False Madonna	Stuart Walker	Kay Francis, Conway Tearle, William Boyd	Drama	Paramount
Fanny Foley Herself	Melville W. Brown	Edna May Oliver, Helen Chandler, Rochelle Hudson	Comedy drama	RKO
Father's Son	William Beaudine	Leon Janney, Irene Rich, Lewis Stone	Drama	Warner Bros.
Fifty Fathoms Deep	Roy William Neill	Jack Holt, Richard Cromwell	Adventure	Columbia
Fifty Million Frenchmen	Lloyd Bacon	Ole Olsen, Chic Johnson, William Gaxton	Musical comedy	Warner Bros.
Fighting Caravans	Otto Brower, David Burton	Gary Cooper, Lili Damita, Ernest Torrence	Western	Paramount
The Fighting Marshal	D. Ross Lederman	Tim McCoy	Western	Columbia
The Fighting Sheriff	Louis King	Buck Jones, Lillian Worth	Western	Columbia
The Finger Points	John Francis Dillon	Richard Barthelmess, Fay Wray, Clark Gable	Drama, Crime	Warner Bros.
Finn and Hattie	Norman Taurog	Leon Errol, ZaSu Pitts	Comedy	Paramount
First Aid	Stuart Paton	Grant Withers, Marjorie Beebe	Crime	Independent
Five and Ten	Robert Z. Leonard	Marion Davies, Leslie Howard, Irene Rich	Drama	MGM
Five Star Final	Mervyn LeRoy	Edward G. Robinson, H. B. Warner, Marian Marsh	Drama	Warner Bros.
The Flood	James Tinling	Eleanor Boardman, Monte Blue	Drama	Columbia
Flying High	Charles Reisner	Bert Lahr, Kathryn Crawford, Charlotte Greenwood	Comedy	MGM
Forbidden Adventure	Norman Taurog	Mitzi Green, Edna May Oliver	Comedy	Paramount
Forgotten Women	Richard Thorpe	Marion Shilling, Beryl Mercer, Edna Murphy	Drama	Monogram
Frankenstein	James Whale	Boris Karloff, Frederick Kerr, Mae Clarke	Horror, Science fiction	Universal
A Free Soul	Clarence Brown	Norma Shearer, Lionel Barrymore, Clark Gable	Drama	MGM
Freighters of Destiny	Fred Allen	Tom Keene, Barbara Kent	Western	RKO
Friends and Lovers	Victor Schertzinger	Lili Damita, Adolphe Menjou, Laurence Olivier	Drama	RKO
The Front Page	Lewis Milestone	Pat O'Brien, Adolphe Menjou, Edward Everett Horton	Comedy	United Artists; Remake of 1974 film

== G-H ==
Title	Director	Cast	Genre	Notes
Galloping Thru	Lloyd Nosler	Tom Tyler, Betty Mack, Alan Bridge	Western	Monogram
The Gang Buster	A. Edward Sutherland	Jack Oakie, Jean Arthur, William Boyd	Comedy	Paramount
The Gay Diplomat	Richard Boleslawski	Ivan Lebedeff, Genevieve Tobin	Spy drama	RKO
Gentleman's Fate	Mervyn LeRoy	John Gilbert, Louis Wolheim, Leila Hyams	Drama	MGM
The Girl Habit	Edward F. Cline	Charlie Ruggles, Tamara Geva, Margaret Dumont	Comedy	Paramount
Girl of the Rio	Herbert Brenon	Dolores del Río, Norman Foster, Boris Karloff	Comedy	RKO
Girls About Town	George Cukor	Kay Francis, Lilyan Tashman, Joel McCrea	Comedy	Paramount
Girls Demand Excitement	Seymour Felix	Virginia Cherrill, John Wayne	Comedy	Fox Film
God's Country and the Man	John P. McCarthy	Tom Tyler, Betty Mack	Western	Independent
God's Gift to Women	Michael Curtiz	Frank Fay, Laura La Plante, Joan Blondell	Musical comedy	Warner Bros.
Gold Dust Gertie	Lloyd Bacon	Winnie Lightner, Ole Olsen, Chic Johnson	Musical comedy	Warner Bros.
Goldie	Benjamin Stoloff	Spencer Tracy, Jean Harlow	Comedy	Fox Film
The Good Bad Girl	Roy William Neill	Mae Clarke, James Hall, Marie Prevost	Drama	Columbia
Good Sport	Kenneth MacKenna	Linda Watkins, John Boles, Greta Nissen	Comedy	Fox Film
Graft	Christy Cabanne	Regis Toomey, Boris Karloff, Dorothy Revier	Drama, Thriller	Universal
The Great Lover	Harry Beaumont	Adolphe Menjou, Irene Dunne, Neil Hamilton	Drama	MGM
The Great Meadow	Charles Brabin	Johnny Mack Brown, Eleanor Boardman, Anita Louise	Adventure	MGM
Grief Street	Richard Thorpe	Barbara Kent, John Holland, Dorothy Christy	Romantic crime/mystery	Chesterfield
The Guardsman	Sidney Franklin	Alfred Lunt, Lynn Fontanne, Roland Young	Comedy drama	MGM
The Guilty Generation	Rowland V. Lee	Leo Carrillo, Constance Cummings, Robert Young	Drama	Columbia
Guilty Hands	W. S. Van Dyke	Lionel Barrymore, Kay Francis, Polly Moran	Drama, Crime	MGM
Gun Smoke	Edward Sloman	Richard Arlen, Mary Brian, William Boyd	Western	Paramount
Hard Hombre	Otto Brower	Hoot Gibson, Lina Basquette	Western	Independent
The Hawk	Jacques Jaccard	Norman Kerry, Nina Quartero, Frank Mayo	Western	Independent
Heartbreak	Alfred L. Werker	Charles Farrell, Madge Evans, Paul Cavanagh	War	Fox Film
Heaven on Earth	Russell Mack	Lew Ayres, Anita Louise	Drama	Universal
Hell-Bent for Frisco	Stuart Paton	Charles Delaney, Vera Reynolds, Carroll Nye	Action	Independent
Hell Bound	Walter Lang	Leo Carrillo, Lloyd Hughes, Lola Lane	Crime	Tiffany
Hell Divers	George W. Hill	Wallace Beery, Clark Gable, Conrad Nagel	Drama, Adventure	MGM
Her Majesty, Love	William Dieterle	Marilyn Miller, Ben Lyon	Musical	Warner Bros.
High Stakes	Lowell Sherman	Mae Murray, Karen Morley	Comedy drama	RKO
His Woman	Edward Sloman	Gary Cooper, Claudette Colbert	Romance	Paramount
A Holy Terror	Irving Cummings	George O'Brien, Sally Eilers, Humphrey Bogart	Western	Fox Film
The Homicide Squad	George Melford	Leo Carrillo, Mary Brian, Noah Beery	Crime	Universal
Honeymoon Lane	William James Craft	June Collyer, Raymond Hatton	Comedy	Paramount
Honor Among Lovers	Dorothy Arzner	Claudette Colbert, Fredric March, Ginger Rogers	Drama	Paramount
Honor of the Family	Lloyd Bacon	Bebe Daniels, Warren William, Alan Mowbray	Drama	Warner Bros.
The Hot Heiress	Clarence G. Badger	Ben Lyon, Ona Munson, Walter Pidgeon	Comedy	Warner Bros.
A House Divided	William Wyler	Walter Huston, Helen Chandler	Drama	Universal
Huckleberry Finn	Norman Taurog	Jackie Coogan, Junior Durkin	Comedy	Paramount
Husband's Holiday	Robert Milton	Clive Brook, Vivienne Osborne, Charles Ruggles	Drama	Paramount
Hush Money	Sidney Lanfield	Joan Bennett, Myrna Loy, George Raft	Comedy	Fox Film

== I-J ==
Title	Director	Cast	Genre	Notes
I Like Your Nerve	William C. McGann	Douglas Fairbanks Jr., Loretta Young, Claud Allister	Romantic comedy	Warner Bros.
I Take This Woman	Marion Gering	Gary Cooper, Carole Lombard, Helen Ware	Romance	Paramount
Illicit	Archie Mayo	Barbara Stanwyck, James Rennie, Ricardo Cortez	Drama	Warner Bros.
In Line of Duty	Bert Glennon	Sue Carol, Noah Beery	Western	Monogram
In Old Cheyenne	Stuart Paton	Rex Lease, Dorothy Gulliver	Western	Independent
Indiscreet	Leo McCarey	Gloria Swanson, Ben Lyon, Monroe Owsley	Drama, Musical	United Artists
Inspiration	Clarence Brown	Greta Garbo, Robert Montgomery, Lewis Stone	Drama	MGM
Iron Man	Tod Browning	Lew Ayres, Robert Armstrong, Jean Harlow	Film noir	Universal; Remade in 1951
Is There Justice?	Stuart Paton	Rex Lease, Henry B. Walthall, Blanche Mehaffey	Crime	Independent
It Pays to Advertise	Frank Tuttle	Norman Foster, Carole Lombard	Comedy	Paramount
It's a Wise Child	Robert Z. Leonard	Marion Davies, Sidney Blackmer, James Gleason	Comedy	MGM
June Moon	A. Edward Sutherland	Frances Dee, June MacCloy, Wynne Gibson	Comedy	Paramount
Just a Gigolo	Jack Conway	William Haines, Irene Purcell, Ray Milland	Comedy	MGM

== K-L ==
Title	Director	Cast	Genre	Notes
Kept Husbands	Lloyd Bacon	Dorothy Mackaill, Joel McCrea, Clara Kimball Young	Drama	RKO
Kick In	Richard Wallace	Clara Bow, Regis Toomey, Wynne Gibson	Crime	Paramount
Kiki	Sam Taylor	Mary Pickford, Reginald Denny, Margaret Livingston	Romantic comedy	United Artists
Kiss Me Again	William A. Seiter	Edward Everett Horton, June Collyer, Walter Pidgeon	Comedy	Warner Bros.
L'aviateur	William A. Seiter	Douglas Fairbanks Jr., Jeanne Helbling	Comedy	
Ladies' Man	Lothar Mendes	William Powell, Carole Lombard, Kay Francis	Drama	Paramount
Ladies of the Big House	Marion Gering	Sylvia Sidney, Gene Raymond, Wynne Gibson	Drama	Paramount
The Lady from Nowhere	Richard Thorpe	Alice Day, John Holland, Barbara Bedford	Crime	Chesterfield
The Lady Refuses	George Archainbaud	Betty Compson, John Darrow, Margaret Livingston	Drama	RKO
The Lady Who Dared	William Beaudine	Billie Dove, Conway Tearle, Sidney Blackmer	Drama	Warner Bros.
Land of Wanted Men	Harry L. Fraser	Bill Cody, Sheila Bromley, Gibson Gowland	Western	Monogram
Lasca of the Rio Grande	Edward Laemmle	Leo Carrillo, Dorothy Burgess	Western	Universal
The Last Flight	William Dieterle	Richard Barthelmess, David Manners, Helen Chandler	Drama	Warner Bros.
The Last Parade	Erle C. Kenton	Jack Holt, Tom Moore, Constance Cummings	Crime	Columbia
The Last Ride	Duke Worne	Dorothy Revier, Virginia Brown Faire	Crime	Universal
Laugh and Get Rich	Gregory La Cava	Hugh Herbert, Edna May Oliver, Dorothy Lee	Comedy	RKO
Laughing Sinners	Harry Beaumont	Joan Crawford, Neil Hamilton, Clark Gable	Drama	MGM
The Law of the Sea	Otto Brower	William Farnum, Sally Blane	Drama	Monogram
The Law of the Tong	Lewis D. Collins	Phyllis Barrington, John Harron	Crime	Independent
The Lawless Woman	Richard Thorpe	Vera Reynolds, Carroll Nye	Crime	Chesterfield
The Lawyer's Secret	Louis J. Gasnier	Richard Arlen, Jean Arthur, Clive Brook	Drama	Paramount
Left Over Ladies	Erle C. Kenton	Claudia Dell, Marjorie Rambeau, Dorothy Revier	Drama	Tiffany
The Lightning Flyer	William Nigh	James Hall, Dorothy Sebastian	Action	Columbia
The Lion and the Lamb	George B. Seitz	Walter Byron, Carmel Myers, Montagu Love	Comedy thriller	Columbia
Little Caesar	Mervyn LeRoy	Edward G. Robinson, Douglas Fairbanks Jr., Glenda Farrell	Drama, Crime	Warner Bros.
Local Boy Makes Good	Mervyn LeRoy	Joe E. Brown, Dorothy Lee	Comedy	Warner Bros.
Lonely Wives	Russell Mack	Edward Everett Horton, Laura La Plante, Esther Ralston	Comedy	RKO
Lover Come Back	Erle C. Kenton	Constance Cummings, Jack Mulhall, Jameson Thomas	Drama	Columbia Pictures

== M-N ==
Title	Director	Cast	Genre	Notes
The Mad Genius	Michael Curtiz	John Barrymore, Marian Marsh, Boris Karloff	Drama, Thriller	Warner Bros.
The Mad Parade	William Beaudine	Evelyn Brent, Irene Rich, Louise Fazenda	War drama	Paramount
The Magnificent Lie	Berthold Viertel	Ruth Chatterton, Ralph Bellamy, Stuart Erwin	Drama	Paramount
Maid to Order	Elmer Clifton	Julian Eltinge, Betty Boyd, George E. Stone	Comedy	Independent
Maker of Men	Edward Sedgwick	Jack Holt, Joan Marsh, John Wayne	Drama	Columbia
The Maltese Falcon	Roy Del Ruth	Ricardo Cortez, Bebe Daniels, Una Merkel	Drama	Warner Bros.
The Man from Death Valley	Lloyd Nosler	Tom Tyler, Betty Mack, Gino Corrado	Western	Monogram
The Man in Possession	Sam Wood	Robert Montgomery, Charlotte Greenwood, Irene Purcell	Comedy	MGM
Man of the World	Richard Wallace	William Powell, Carole Lombard, Wynne Gibson	Romance	Paramount
The Man Who Came Back	Raoul Walsh	Janet Gaynor, Charles Farrell, Kenneth MacKenna	Drama	Fox Film
Manhattan Parade	Lloyd Bacon	Charles Butterworth, Winnie Lightner, Dickie Moore	Comedy	Warner Bros.
Many a Slip	Vin Moore	Joan Bennett, Lew Ayres, Slim Summerville	Comedy	Universal
Mata Hari	George Fitzmaurice	Greta Garbo, Ramón Novarro, Lionel Barrymore	Drama	MGM
Meet the Wife	Leslie Pearce	Laura La Plante, Lew Cody, Joan Marsh	Comedy	Columbia
Men Call It Love	Edgar Selwyn	Adolphe Menjou, Leila Hyams, Norman Foster	Drama	MGM
Men in Her Life	William Beaudine	Lois Moran, Charles Bickford, Victor Varconi	Drama	Columbia
Men of Chance	George Archainbaud	Ricardo Cortez, Mary Astor, Ralph Ince	Drama, Crime	RKO
Men of the Sky	Alfred E. Green	Irene Delroy, Bramwell Fletcher, Jack Whiting	Musical	Warner Bros.
Men on Call	John G. Blystone	Edmund Lowe, Mae Clarke	Drama	Fox Film
Merely Mary Ann	Henry King	Janet Gaynor, Charles Farrell, Beryl Mercer	Romantic comedy	Fox Film
Millie	John Francis Dillon	Helen Twelvetrees, Lilyan Tashman	Drama	RKO
The Millionaire	John G. Adolfi	George Arliss, James Cagney, Noah Beery	Comedy, Drama	Warner Bros.
The Miracle Woman	Frank Capra	Barbara Stanwyck, David Manners, Sam Hardy	Drama	Columbia
Misbehaving Ladies	William Beaudine	Lila Lee, Ben Lyon, Louise Fazenda	Comedy	Warner Bros.
Monkey Business	Norman Z. McLeod	Groucho Marx, Harpo Marx, Chico Marx	Comedy	Paramount
The Montana Kid	Harry L. Fraser	Bill Cody, Doris Hill	Western	Monogram
Morals for Women	Mort Blumenstock	Bessie Love, Conway Tearle	Drama	Tiffany
Mother and Son	John P. McCarthy	Clara Kimball Young, John Elliott	Drama	Monogram
Mounted Fury	Stuart Paton	John Bowers, Blanche Mehaffey	Western	Independent
Mr. Lemon of Orange	John G. Blystone	El Brendel, Fifi D'Orsay	Comedy	Fox Film
Murder at Midnight	Frank R. Strayer	Alice White, Aileen Pringle	Mystery	Tiffany
Murder by the Clock	Edward Sloman	William Boyd, Lilyan Tashman, Regis Toomey	Mystery	Paramount
My Past	Roy Del Ruth	Bebe Daniels, Lewis Stone, Ben Lyon	Drama	Warner Bros.
My Sin	George Abbott	Tallulah Bankhead, Fredric March	Drama	Paramount
The Mystery Train	Phil Whitman	Hedda Hopper, Marceline Day, Nick Stuart	Mystery	Independent
The Naughty Flirt	Edward F. Cline	Alice White, Paul Page, Myrna Loy	Comedy	Warner Bros.
Near the Trail's End	Wallace Fox	Bob Steele, Marion Shockley	Western	Tiffany
Neck and Neck	Richard Thorpe	Glenn Tryon, Vera Reynolds, Walter Brennan	Drama	Independent
The Nevada Buckaroo	John P. McCarthy	Bob Steele, Ed Brady	Western	Tiffany
Never the Twain Shall Meet	W. S. Van Dyke	Leslie Howard, Conchita Montenegro, Karen Morley	Drama	MGM
New Adventures of Get Rich Quick Wallingford	Sam Wood	William Haines, Jimmy Durante	Comedy	MGM
Nice Women	Edwin H. Knopf	Sidney Fox, Frances Dee, Alan Mowbray	Romance	Universal
The Night Angel	Edmund Goulding	Nancy Carroll, Fredric March	Drama	Paramount
Night Beat	George B. Seitz	Jack Mulhall, Patsy Ruth Miller, Walter McGrail	Crime	Independent
Night Life in Reno	Raymond Cannon	Virginia Valli, Jameson Thomas, Dorothy Christy	Crime	Independent
Night Nurse	William A. Wellman	Barbara Stanwyck, Joan Blondell, Ben Lyon	Drama	Warner Bros.
No Limit	Frank Tuttle	Clara Bow, Norman Foster, Stuart Erwin	Comedy	Paramount
Not Exactly Gentlemen	Benjamin Stoloff	Victor McLaglen, Fay Wray, Lew Cody	Western	Fox Film

== O-P ==
Title	Director	Cast	Genre	Notes
Oklahoma Jim	Harry L. Fraser	Bill Cody, Marion Burns, William Desmond	Western	Monogram
Once a Lady	Guthrie McClintic	Ruth Chatterton, Ivor Novello, Jill Esmond	Drama	Paramount
Once a Sinner	Guthrie McClintic	Dorothy Mackaill, Joel McCrea, John Halliday	Romance	Fox Film
One Heavenly Night	George Fitzmaurice	Evelyn Laye, John Boles, Leon Errol	Comedy	United Artists
The One Way Trail	Ray Taylor	Tim McCoy, Doris Hill, Carroll Nye	Western	Columbia
Other Men's Women	William A. Wellman	Grant Withers, Regis Toomey, Mary Astor	Drama	Warner Bros.
Over the Hill	Henry King	Mae Marsh, James Dunn	Drama	Fox Film
The Pagan Lady	John Francis Dillon	Evelyn Brent, Conrad Nagel, Roland Young	Drama	Columbia
The Painted Desert	Howard Higgin	William Boyd, Helen Twelvetrees, Clark Gable	Western	RKO
Palmy Days	A. Edward Sutherland	Eddie Cantor, Charlotte Greenwood, Barbara Weeks	Musical comedy	United Artists
Pardon Us	James Parrott	Stan Laurel, Oliver Hardy	Comedy	MGM
Parlor, Bedroom and Bath	Edward Sedgwick	Buster Keaton, Charlotte Greenwood, Reginald Denny	Comedy	MGM
Partners of the Trail	Wallace Fox	Tom Tyler, Betty Mack	Western	Monogram
Party Husband	Clarence G. Badger	Dorothy Mackaill, James Rennie, Dorothy Peterson	Comedy	Warner Bros.
Peach O'Reno	William A. Seiter	Bert Wheeler, Robert Woolsey, Dorothy Lee	Comedy	RKO
Penrod and Sam	William Beaudine	Leon Janney, Frank Coghlan	Comedy	Warner Bros.
Personal Maid	Monta Bell, Lothar Mendes	Nancy Carroll, Pat O'Brien	Drama	Paramount
The Phantom	Alan James	Guinn Williams, Tom O'Brien	Horror	Independent
The Phantom of Paris	John S. Robertson	John Gilbert, Leila Hyams, Jean Hersholt	Drama	MGM
Platinum Blonde	Frank Capra	Loretta Young, Jean Harlow, Robert Williams	Comedy	Columbia
Pleasure	Otto Brower	Conway Tearle, Carmel Myers, Frances Dade	Drama	Independent
The Pocatello Kid	Phil Rosen	Ken Maynard, Marceline Day	Western	Tiffany
Politics	Charles Reisner	Marie Dressler, Polly Moran, Roscoe Ates	Romantic comedy	MGM
Possessed	Clarence Brown	Joan Crawford, Clark Gable, Wallace Ford	Drama	MGM
The Primrose Path	William A. O'Connor	Helen Foster, Dorothy Granger, Lane Chandler	Drama	Independent
Private Lives	Sidney Franklin	Norma Shearer, Robert Montgomery, Reginald Denny	Comedy, Drama	MGM
A Private Scandal	Charles Hutchison	Marian Nixon, Lloyd Hughes, Theodore von Eltz	Crime	Independent
The Prodigal	Harry A. Pollard	Lawrence Tibbett, Esther Ralston, Roland Young	Romance	MGM
The Public Defender	J. Walter Ruben	Richard Dix, Shirley Grey	Crime	RKO
The Public Enemy	William A. Wellman	James Cagney, Jean Harlow, Edward Woods	Drama, Crime	Warner Bros.

== Q-R ==
Title	Director	Cast	Genre	Notes
Quick Millions	Rowland Brown	Spencer Tracy, Sally Eilers, George Raft	Crime drama	Fox Film
The Rainbow Trail	David Howard	George O'Brien, Cecilia Parker, Minna Gombell	Western	Fox Film
The Range Feud	D. Ross Lederman	Buck Jones, John Wayne, Susan Fleming	Western	Columbia
Range Law	Phil Rosen	Ken Maynard, Frances Dade, Frank Mayo	Western	Tiffany
Rebound	Edward H. Griffith	Robert Ames, Ina Claire, Myrna Loy	Drama	RKO
The Reckless Hour	John Francis Dillon	Dorothy Mackaill, Conrad Nagel, Joan Blondell	Drama	Warner Bros.
Reckless Living	Cyril Gardner	Ricardo Cortez, Mae Clarke, Norman Foster	Drama	Universal
Reducing	Charles Reisner	Marie Dressler, Polly Moran, Anita Page	Comedy	MGM
Resurrection	Edwin Carewe	Lupe Vélez, John Boles	Drama	Universal
Rich Man's Folly	John Cromwell	Frances Dee, George Bancroft	Drama	Paramount
Rider of the Plains	John P. McCarthy	Tom Tyler, Lilian Bond	Western	Independent
Riders of the Purple Sage	Hamilton MacFadden	George O'Brien, Marguerite Churchill	Western	Fox Film
Riders of the Rio	Robert Emmett Tansey	Lane Chandler, Sheldon Lewis, Ben Corbett	Western	Independent
The Ridin' Fool	John P. McCarthy	Bob Steele, Frances Morris, Florence Turner	Western	Tiffany
The Right of Way	Frank Lloyd	Conrad Nagel, Loretta Young	Drama	Warner Bros.
The Road to Reno	Richard Wallace	Lilyan Tashman, Charles Rogers, Peggy Shannon	Comedy, Drama	Paramount
The Road to Singapore	Alfred E. Green	William Powell, Doris Kenyon, Louis Calhern	Romance	Warner Bros.
The Royal Bed	Lowell Sherman	Mary Astor, Anthony Bushell	Comedy	RKO
The Ruling Voice	Rowland V. Lee	Walter Huston, Loretta Young, Dudley Digges	Crime drama	Warner Bros.
The Runaround	William James Craft	Mary Brian, Marie Prevost	Comedy	RKO

== S ==
Title	Director	Cast	Genre	Notes
Safe in Hell	William A. Wellman	Dorothy Mackaill, Donald Cook, Ralf Harolde	Thriller	Warner Bros.
Salvation Nell	James Cruze	Ralph Graves, Helen Chandler, Sally O'Neil	Drama	Tiffany
Scandal Sheet	John Cromwell	George Bancroft, Kay Francis, Clive Brook	Drama	Paramount
Sea Devils	Joseph Levering	Molly O'Day, Edmund Burns, Paul Panzer	Drama	Independent
The Sea Ghost	William Nigh	Alan Hale, Laura La Plante, Claud Allister	Drama	Independent
Seas Beneath	John Ford	George O'Brien, Mona Maris, Warren Hymer	Adventure	Fox Film
The Secret Call	Stuart Walker	Peggy Shannon, Richard Arlen, William B. Davidson	Drama	Paramount
Secret Menace	Richard C. Kahn	Glenn Tryon, Virginia Brown Faire	Action	Independent
Secret Service	J. Walter Ruben	Richard Dix, Shirley Grey	War	RKO
The Secret Six	George W. Hill	Wallace Beery, Jean Harlow, Lewis Stone	Crime	MGM
The Secret Witness	Thornton Freeland	Una Merkel, ZaSu Pitts	Mystery	Columbia
Secrets of a Secretary	George Abbott	Claudette Colbert, Herbert Marshall	Drama	Paramount
Seed	John M. Stahl	John Boles, Lois Wilson, Genevieve Tobin	Drama	Universal
Shanghaied Love	George B. Seitz	Richard Cromwell, Sally Blane	Drama	Columbia
The She-Wolf	James Flood	May Robson, Lawrence Gray	Drama	Universal
Shipmates	Harry A. Pollard	Robert Montgomery, Dorothy Jordan	Comedy	MGM
Ships of Hate	John P. McCarthy	Lloyd Hughes, Dorothy Sebastian	Adventure	Monogram
Shotgun Pass	J. P. McGowan	Tim McCoy, Virginia Lee Corbin	Western	Columbia
Side Show	Roy Del Ruth	Winnie Lightner, Charles Butterworth	Musical comedy	Warner Bros.
Sidewalks of New York	Zion Meyers, Jules White	Buster Keaton, Anita Page, Cliff Edwards	Comedy	MGM
Silence	Louis J. Gasnier	Clive Brook, Peggy Shannon	Crime	Paramount
The Sin of Madelon Claudet	Edgar Selwyn	Helen Hayes, Lewis Stone, Neil Hamilton	Drama	MGM
The Sin Ship	Louis Wolheim	Mary Astor, Louis Wolheim, Ian Keith	Drama	RKO
The Single Sin	William Nigh	Kay Johnson, Bert Lytell, Holmes Herbert	Drama	Tiffany
Sit Tight	Lloyd Bacon	Winnie Lightner, Joe E. Brown, Claudia Dell	Musical comedy	Warner Bros.
Six Cylinder Love	Thornton Freeland	Spencer Tracy, Edward Everett Horton	Comedy	Fox Film
Skippy	Norman Taurog	Jackie Cooper, Mitzi Green, Jackie Searl	Comedy, Drama	Paramount
Skyline	Sam Taylor	Thomas Meighan, Maureen O'Sullivan, Myrna Loy	Drama	Fox Film
Sky Raiders	Christy Cabanne	Lloyd Hughes, Marceline Day	Adventure	Columbia
The Sky Spider	Richard Thorpe	Glenn Tryon, Beryl Mercer, Blanche Mehaffey	Adventure	Independent
Smart Money	Alfred E. Green	Edward G. Robinson, James Cagney, Margaret Livingston	Drama, Crime	Warner Bros.
Smart Woman	Gregory La Cava	Mary Astor, Robert Ames	Comedy drama	RKO
The Smiling Lieutenant	Ernst Lubitsch	Maurice Chevalier, Claudette Colbert, Miriam Hopkins	Musical comedy	Paramount
Sob Sister	Alfred Santell	James Dunn, Linda Watkins	Romance	Fox Film
Son of India	Jacques Feyder	Ramón Novarro, Madge Evans	Romance	MGM
Sooky	Norman Taurog	Jackie Cooper, Robert Coogan, Jackie Searl	Adventure	Paramount
Soul of the Slums	Frank R. Strayer	William Collier Jr., Blanche Mehaffey	Drama	Independent
The Spider	William Cameron Menzies	Edmund Lowe, Lois Moran	Mystery	Fox Film
The Spirit of Notre Dame	Russell Mack	Lew Ayres, Sally Blane, William Bakewell	Drama, Sports	Universal
Sporting Blood	Charles Brabin	Clark Gable, Madge Evans, Ernest Torrence	Sports	MGM
Sporting Chance	Albert Herman	William Collier Jr., Claudia Dell, James Hall	Action	Independent
The Spy	Berthold Viertel	Kay Johnson, Neil Hamilton	Drama	Fox Film
The Squaw Man	Cecil B. DeMille	Warner Baxter, Lupe Vélez, Eleanor Boardman	Drama	MGM
The Star Witness	William A. Wellman	Walter Huston, Frances Starr	Crime drama	Warner Bros.
Stepping Out	Charles Reisner	Charlotte Greenwood, Leila Hyams, Reginald Denny	Comedy	MGM
Stolen Heaven	George Abbott	Nancy Carroll, Phillips Holmes, Louis Calhern	Drama	Paramount
The Stolen Jools	William C. McGann	Wallace Beery, Buster Keaton, Norma Shearer	Comedy	Paramount
Strangers May Kiss	George Fitzmaurice	Norma Shearer, Robert Montgomery, Neil Hamilton	Drama	MGM
Street Scene	King Vidor	Sylvia Sidney, Estelle Taylor, Beulah Bondi	Drama	United Artists
Strictly Dishonorable	John M. Stahl	Paul Lukas, Sidney Fox, Lewis Stone	Comedy	Universal
The Struggle	D. W. Griffith	Hal Skelly, Zita Johann	Drama	United Artists
Subway Express	Fred C. Newmeyer	Jack Holt, Aileen Pringle	Mystery	Columbia
Suicide Fleet	Albert S. Rogell	William Boyd, James Gleason, Ginger Rogers	War	RKO
Sundown Trail	Robert F. Hill	Tom Keene, Marion Shilling	Western	RKO
The Sunrise Trail	John P. McCarthy	Bob Steele, Blanche Mehaffey	Western	Tiffany
Surrender	William K. Howard	Warner Baxter, Leila Hyams, Ralph Bellamy	War	Fox Film
Susan Lenox (Her Fall and Rise)	Robert Z. Leonard	Clark Gable, Greta Garbo, Jean Hersholt	Drama	MGM
Svengali	Archie Mayo	John Barrymore, Marian Marsh, Donald Crisp	Drama	Warner Bros.
Swanee River	Raymond Cannon	Grant Withers, Thelma Todd, Philo McCullough	Musical	Independent
Sweepstakes	Albert S. Rogell	James Gleason, Marian Nixon	Comedy	RKO

== T ==
Title	Director	Cast	Genre	Notes
Tabu	F. W. Murnau	Matahi, Anne Chevalier	Drama	Paramount
A Tailor Made Man	Sam Wood	William Haines, Dorothy Jordan	Comedy	MGM
Tarnished Lady	George Cukor	Tallulah Bankhead, Clive Brook	Drama	Paramount
Ten Cents a Dance	Lionel Barrymore	Barbara Stanwyck, Ricardo Cortez	Romance drama	Columbia
Ten Nights in a Barroom	William A. O'Connor	William Farnum, Tom Santschi, Phyllis Barrington	Drama	Independent
The Texas Ranger	D. Ross Lederman	Buck Jones, Carmelita Geraghty	Western	Columbia
Their Mad Moment	Chandler Sprague	Dorothy Mackaill, Warner Baxter	Comedy	Fox Film
This Modern Age	Nick Grinde	Joan Crawford, Neil Hamilton, Pauline Frederick	Drama	MGM
Three Girls Lost	Sidney Lanfield	Loretta Young, John Wayne	Drama	Fox Film
Three Who Loved	George Archainbaud	Betty Compson, Conrad Nagel	Drama	RKO
The Tip-Off	Albert S. Rogell	Eddie Quillan, Ginger Rogers, Robert Armstrong	Comedy	RKO
Tonight or Never	Mervyn LeRoy	Gloria Swanson, Constance Cummings	Comedy	United Artists
Too Many Cooks	William A. Seiter	Bert Wheeler, Dorothy Lee	Romantic comedy	RKO
Too Young to Marry	Mervyn LeRoy	Loretta Young, Grant Withers	Comedy	Warner Bros.
Touchdown	Norman Z. McLeod	Richard Arlen, Peggy Shannon	Sports	Paramount
Trader Horn	W. S. Van Dyke	Harry Carey, Edwina Booth, C. Aubrey Smith	Drama, Adventure	MGM
Transatlantic	William K. Howard	Edmund Lowe, Myrna Loy, John Halliday	Drama	Fox Film
Transgression	Herbert Brenon	Kay Francis, Paul Cavanagh, Ricardo Cortez	Drama	RKO
Trapped	Bruce M. Mitchell	Nick Stuart, Priscilla Dean, Nina Quartero	Crime	Independent
Traveling Husbands	Paul Sloane	Evelyn Brent, Constance Cummings	Drama	RKO
24 Hours	Marion Gering	Kay Francis, Miriam Hopkins, Regis Toomey	Drama	Paramount
Two Fisted Justice	George Arthur Durlam	Tom Tyler, Barbara Weeks	Western	Monogram
The Two Gun Man	Phil Rosen	Ken Maynard, Lucille Powers	Western	Tiffany

== U-Z ==
Title	Director	Cast	Genre	Notes
Under Eighteen	Archie Mayo	Marian Marsh, Anita Page, Warren William	Drama	Warner Bros.
Under Suspicion	A. F. Ericsson	Lois Moran, J. Harold Murray, George Brent	Drama	Fox Film
Unfaithful	John Cromwell	Ruth Chatterton, Paul Lukas, Juliette Compton	Drama	Paramount
The Unholy Garden	George Fitzmaurice	Ronald Colman, Fay Wray, Estelle Taylor	Drama	United Artists
Up for Murder	Monta Bell	Lew Ayres, Genevieve Tobin, Frank McHugh	Drama	Universal
Up Pops the Devil	A. Edward Sutherland	Richard "Skeets" Gallagher, Carole Lombard, Stuart Erwin	Comedy	Paramount
The Vice Squad	John Cromwell	Kay Francis, Paul Lukas, Judith Wood	Drama, Crime	Paramount
The Viking	George Melford	Louise Huntington, Charles Starrett, Robert Bartlett	Adventure	Independent
The Virtuous Husband	Vin Moore	Betty Compson, Elliott Nugent, Jean Arthur	Comedy	Universal
Waterloo Bridge	James Whale	Mae Clarke, Bette Davis, Frederick Kerr	Drama, War	Universal; Remake of 1940 film
Way Back Home	William A. Seiter	Phillips Lord, Bette Davis, Frank Albertson	Comedy, Drama	RKO
West of Broadway	Harry Beaumont	John Gilbert, Lois Moran, Madge Evans	Drama	MGM
White Renegade	Jack Irwin	Tom Santschi, Blanche Mehaffey, Philo McCullough	Western	Independent
White Shoulders	Melville W. Brown	Mary Astor, Jack Holt, Ricardo Cortez	Comedy drama	RKO
Wicked	Allan Dwan	Elissa Landi, Victor McLaglen, Una Merkel	Drama	Fox Film
Wild Horse	Richard Thorpe	Hoot Gibson, Alberta Vaughn	Western	Independent
Woman Hungry	Clarence G. Badger	Sidney Blackmer, Lila Lee	Western	Warner Bros.
The Woman Between	Victor Schertzinger	Lili Damita, Lester Vail	Drama	RKO
A Woman of Experience	Harry Joe Brown	Helen Twelvetrees, William Bakewell, Lew Cody	War drama	RKO
Women Go on Forever	Walter Lang	Clara Kimball Young, Marian Nixon	Drama	Tiffany
Women Love Once	Edward Goodman	Paul Lukas, Eleanor Boardman, Juliette Compton	Drama	Paramount
Women of All Nations	Raoul Walsh	Victor McLaglen, Edmund Lowe, Greta Nissen	Comedy	Fox Film
Women Men Marry	Charles Hutchison	Natalie Moorhead, Sally Blane, Randolph Scott	Drama	Independent
Working Girls	Dorothy Arzner	Judith Wood, Dorothy Hall, Paul Lukas	Drama	Paramount
X Marks the Spot	Erle C. Kenton	Sally Blane, Lew Cody, Fred Kohler	Drama, Crime	Tiffany
Yankee Don	Noel M. Smith	Richard Talmadge, Lupita Tovar	Western	Independent
The Yellow Ticket	Raoul Walsh	Lionel Barrymore, Laurence Olivier, Elissa Landi	Drama	Fox Film
Young as You Feel	Frank Borzage	Will Rogers, Fifi D'Orsay, Lucien Littlefield	Comedy	Fox Film
Young Donovan's Kid	Fred Niblo	Richard Dix, Marion Shilling, Jackie Cooper	Drama	RKO
Young Sinners	John G. Blystone	Thomas Meighan, Dorothy Jordan	Drama	Fox Film

== Documentaries ==
Title	Director	Cast	Genre	Notes
Around the World in 80 Minutes with Douglas Fairbanks	Douglas Fairbanks	Douglas Fairbanks	Documentary	United Artists

== Multiple-language versions ==
Title	Director	Cast	Genre	Notes
El código penal	Phil Rosen	Barry Norton, Maria Alba	Prison drama	Spanish language
Demon of the Sea	Michael Curtiz	William Dieterle, Lissy Arna, Anton Pointner	Drama	Warner Bros. German-language. Lost film
El Impostor	Lewis Seiler	Juan Torena, Blanca Castejon	Drama	Spanish language
Eran Trece	David Howard	Juan Torena, Ana Maria Custodio	Comedy. Mystery	Spanish language
La ley del harem	Lewis Seiler	José Mojica, Carmen Larrabeiti	Drama	Spanish language
Mi ultimo amor	Lewis Seiler	José Mojica, Ana Maria Custodio	Romance	Spanish language

== See also ==
- 1931 in the United States
