= Gordon De Main =

American actor (1886–1954)

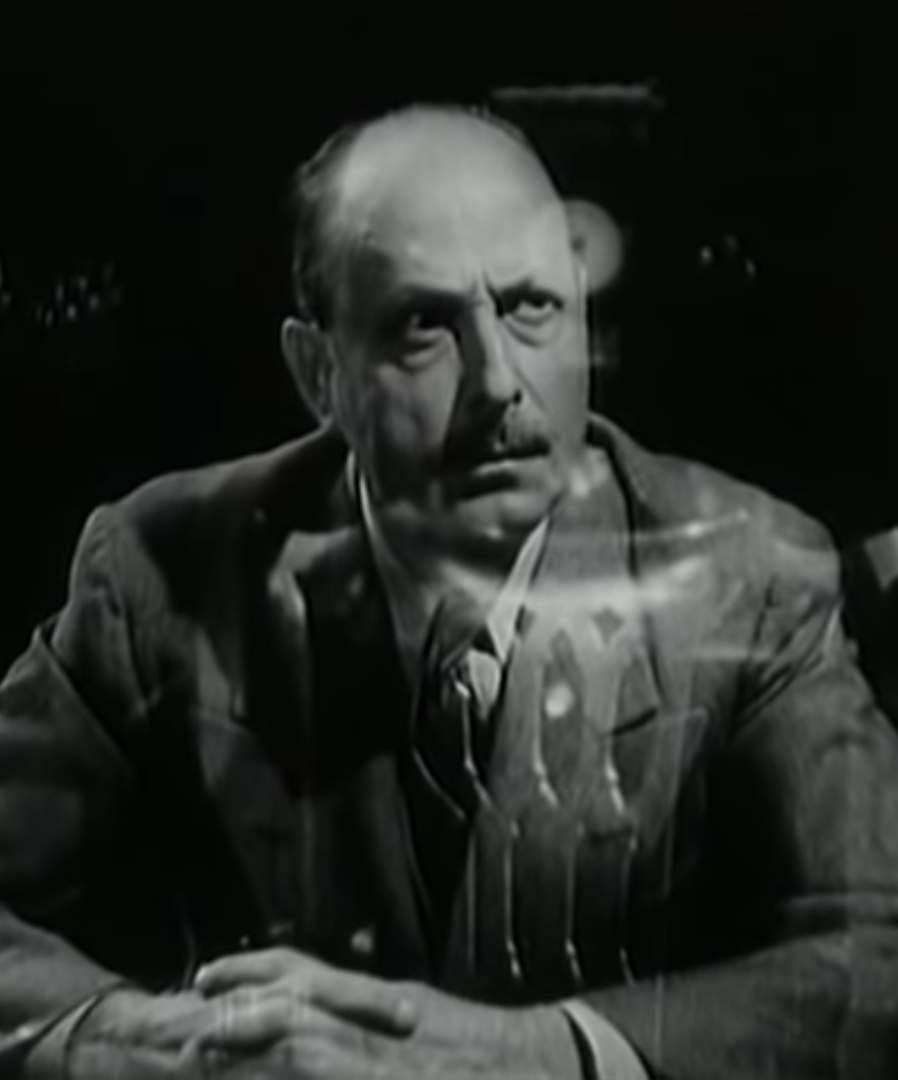
- Main in The Mad Monster (1942)
- Born: Floyd Wood; September 28, 1886; Washington, Iowa, U.S.
- Died: March 5, 1954 (aged 67); Los Angeles County, California, U.S.
- Other names: Gordon De Maine; Gordon Wood(s); G. D. Wood(s); G. A. Wood(s); Bud Wood; J. D. Wood
- Occupation: Actor
- Years active: 1914–1946

Gordon De Main (born Floyd Wood; September 28, 1886 – March 5, 1954) was an American film actor. He was leading man for the New York–based Excelsior company in the early 1910s, and was later a supporting actor in many films, particularly Westerns.

Born in Washington, Iowa, he was variously credited as Gordon De Maine / DeMain / DeMaine, Gordon Wood(s), G. D. Wood(s), G. A. Wood(s), Bud Wood or J. D. Wood. He died March 5, 1954, in Los Angeles County, California.

== Selected filmography ==
- The Toll of Mammon (1914) – Dr. John Wright
- The Path Forbidden (1914) – Curtis Holmes
- When Fate Leads Trump (1914) – Gordon
- In the Shadow (1915) – Tom Ward
- The Lawbreakers (1915, Short) – Judge Parker
- The Hen's Duckling (1915, Short) – Philip Charleroi, Vivienne's Father
- The Reward (1915, Short) – John Barrick
- The Game of Thrills (1915) – Graves
- The Jewelled Dagger of Fate (1915, Short) – Travers
- Why Leave Home? (1929) –Roy
- Prince Gabby (1929, Short)
- The Marriage Playground (1929) – Mr. Delafield
- Street of Chance (1930) – Gambler (uncredited)
- Young Eagles (1930) – Major Lewis
- Men Are Like That (1930) – Rogers the Insurance Man (uncredited)
- Pardon My Gun (1930) – Rancher (uncredited)
- Headin' North (1930) – Foreman Red
- God's Country and the Man (1931) – Slick (uncredited)
- Rider of the Plains (1931) – Sheriff John Evans
- Up for Murder (1931) –Prosecuting Attorney (uncredited)
- The Ridin' Fool (1931) – Sheriff John Andrews
- The Lawyer's Secret (1931) – Detective (uncredited)
- Ships of Hate (1931) – Ship's First Mate
- A Son of the Plains (1931) – Sheriff Matt Woods
- Mother and Son (1931) – Joe Connors
- The Montana Kid (1931) – Marshal Jack Moore
- Near the Trail's End (1931) – Gus – Bartender (uncredited)
- The Nevada Buckaroo (1931) – Governor (uncredited)
- Oklahoma Jim (1931) – The Croupier (uncredited)
- Two Fisted Justice (1931) – Marshal Houston
- Cavalier of the West (1931) – Doctor (uncredited)
- Forgotten Women (1931) – Walrus
- Galloping Thru (1931) – Cliff Warren
- Mata Hari (1931) – Ambassador's Aide (uncredited)
- Vultures of the Law (1931)
- South of Santa Fe (1932) – Granger
- Single-Handed Sanders (1932) – Judge Parker
- Spirit of the West (1932) – Bob March (uncredited)
- Love Bound (1932) – Flynn, Private Detective (uncredited)
- The Wet Parade (1932) – Eye Specialist (uncredited)
- The Arm of the Law (1932) – Coroner
- State's Attorney (1932) – Lawn Party Guest (uncredited)
- Beauty Parlor (1932) – Arresting Detective (uncredited)
- Honor of the Mounted (1932) – Corporal McCarty
- What Price Hollywood? (1932) – The 'Yes' Man (uncredited)
- The Washington Masquerade (1932) – Locker Room Host (uncredited)
- Skyscraper Souls (1932) – Banker (uncredited)
- Broadway to Cheyenne (1932) – Rancher
- No Living Witness (1932) – Eddie Schrabe
- The Western Code (1932) – Sheriff Fred Purdy
- Cowboy Counsellor (1932) – State's Attorney – Replaced by Ted Lorch
- The Heart Punch (1932) – Defense Attorney Benton
- The Forty-Niners (1932) – Jed Hawkins
- The Devil Horse (1932) – Rancher (uncredited)
- Behind Jury Doors (1932) – Dr. Emil Lanfield
- Lucky Larrigan (1932) – Sheriff Jim
- Crashin' Broadway (1932) – Sheriff (uncredited)
- Wyoming (1932) - Judge Parker
- Beyond the Border (1932)
- Parachute Jumper (1933) – Narcotics Squad (uncredited)
- Grand Slam (1933) – Kibitzer (uncredited)
- The Intruder (1933) – Doctor (uncredited)
- High Gear (1933) – Maj. Edwards – Military Academy Commandant (uncredited)
- Alimony Madness (1933) – Doctor (uncredited)
- The Dude Bandit (1933) – Dad Mason
- The Three Musketeers (1933, Serial) – Colonel Duval
- Found Alive (1933) – Attorney
- The Whispering Shadow (1933, Serial) – Detective [Chs. 1, 5-8] (uncredited)
- Song of the Eagle (1933) – Restaurant Owner (uncredited)
- Cheating Blondes (1933) – Policeman (uncredited)
- Lilly Turner (1933) – Doctor (uncredited)
- The Return of Casey Jones (1933) – Ike MacFarland
- The Silk Express (1933) – Mill Owner in Association (uncredited)
- The Fighting Texans (1933) – Julian Nash
- Strange People (1933) – First Detective (uncredited)
- The Fugitive (1933) – Nicholson
- Rainbow Ranch (1933) – Sheriff
- The Devil's Mate (1933) – Butler
- The Big Chance (1933) – Ed Miller (uncredited)
- Her Forgotten Past (1933) – Malone (uncredited)
- Neighbors' Wives (1933) – Minor Role (uncredited)
- The Wolf Dog (1933) – Murphy
- Goodbye Love (1933) – Divorce Detective (uncredited)
- Mr. Skitch (1933) – Roulette Table Staff (uncredited)
- The Lucky Texan (1934) – Banker Williams
- Palooka (1934) – Photographers' Official (uncredited)
- Beggars in Ermine (1934) – Police Captain (uncredited)
- Wonder Bar (1934) – Second Detective (uncredited)
- Mystery Liner (1934) – Cmdr. Bryson (uncredited)
- Looking for Trouble (1934) – Sergeant Murphy (uncredited)
- Fighting to Live (1934) – Al – Jury Foreman (uncredited)
- Now I'll Tell (1934) – Fight Announcer (uncredited)
- Burn 'Em Up Barnes (1934, Serial) – Tom - Car Owner [Ch. 1] (uncredited)
- Chained (1934) – S.S. Official (uncredited)
- Gambling House Proprietor (uncredited)
- Million Dollar Ransom (1934) – Gambling House Proprietor (uncredited)
- Super Stupid (1934, Short)
- Port of Lost Dreams (1934) – First Dock Detective (uncredited)
- We Live Again (1934) – Jury Foreman (uncredited)
- Fighting Trooper (1934) – Bartender (uncredited)
- The Firebird (1934) – Policeman (uncredited)
- In Old Santa Fe (1934) – Bill – Tracy Henchman (uncredited)
- The Lawless Frontier (1934) – Deputy Miller
- The Gay Bride (1934) – Police Sergeant (uncredited)
- The Best Man Wins (1935) – Salvage Boss (uncredited)
- The Cactus Kid (1935) – Jake – Bartender (uncredited)
- Helldorado (1935) – Assayer (uncredited)
- Behind the Evidence (1935) – Captain Graham
- The Whole Town's Talking (1935) – Minor Role (uncredited)
- Red Lights Ahead (1936) – Detective (uncredited)
- Espionage (1937) – Kronsky Aide (uncredited)
- The Painted Stallion (1937, Serial) – The Governor [Chs. 7-12]
- The Last Train from Madrid (1937) – Gonzalez (uncredited)
- A Fight to the Finish (1937) – District Attorney (uncredited)
- Western Gold (1937) – Secretary Stanton (uncredited)
- Murder in Greenwich Village (1937) – Captain Bates (uncredited)
- Submarine D-1 (1937) – Officer (uncredited)
- Second Chorus (1940) – Elevator Passenger (uncredited)
- Adventure in Washington (1941) – Senator Day (uncredited)
- Time Out for Rhythm (1941) – Theatrical Producer (uncredited)
- Hold Back the Dawn (1941) – Immigration Guard (uncredited)
- Honky Tonk (1941) – Party Guest (uncredited)
- International Lady (1941) – Denby
- Henry Aldrich for President (1941) – Police Chief (uncredited)
- Appointment for Love (1941) – Jason (uncredited)
- Riot Squad (1941) – Plainclothesman (uncredited)
- West of Tombstone (1942) – Wilfred Barnet
- Call Out the Marines (1942) – Wise Money Man (uncredited)
- The Mad Monster (1942) – Professor Fitzgerald
- This Gun for Hire (1942) – Superintendent (uncredited)
- Thundering Hoofs (1942) – Dave Underwood
- Across the Pacific (1942) – Dock Official (uncredited)
- King of the Stallions (1942) – Pop Clark
- Overland to Deadwood (1942) – George Bullock
- I Married a Witch (1942) – Man with Masterson on Radio (uncredited)
- Falling Stones (1942)
- Lady Bodyguard (1943) – Director (uncredited)
- Chatterbox (1943) – Production Assistant (uncredited) (final film role)
