= The Sunrise Trail =

1931 film

- Directed by: John P. McCarthy
- Written by: Wellyn Totman
- Produced by: Trem Carr
- Cinematography: Archie Stout
- Distributed by: Tiffany Productions, Inc.
- Release date: February 7, 1931 (US)
- Running time: 63 minutes
- Country: United States
- Language: English

The Sunrise Trail is a 1931 American Western film directed by John P. McCarthy and written by Wellyn Totman. Produced by Trem Carr, the film was released on 7 February 1931 by Tiffany Productions, Inc.

== Plot ==
Tex, working undercover for the sheriff to expose a gang of cattle rustlers, crosses the Mexican border and ends up at a tavern called Sadie's Place. There he becomes friends with Kansas, an outlaw and with Goldie, a fugitive from justice with whom he falls in love. Tex discovers that the murder committed by Goldie was ruled justifiable homicide but cannot tell her or he will blow his cover. Goldie helps Tex enter the gang but discovers Rand knows he is an undercover agent. After she warns Tex, he convinces her to leave Mexico under the pretense of fleeing further north to Canada. After he gives his information to the sheriff, Tex kills Rand in a shoot-out while Kansas is fatally shot by the posse. Kansas forgives Tex as he dies, and Tex and Goldie decide to get married.

== Cast ==
- Bob Steele as Tex
- Blanche Mehaffey as Goldie
- Jack Clifford as Kansas
- Germaine de Neel as French Sadie
- Eddie Dunn as Rand
- Fred Burns as the sheriff

== See also ==
- Bob Steele filmography
- List of American films of 1931
