= Headin' North (1930 film) =

1930 film directed by John P. McCarthy

- Directed by: John P. McCarthy
- Written by: John P. McCarthy
- Produced by: Trem Carr
- Edited by: Fred Allen
- Production company: Trem Carr Productions
- Distributed by: Tiffany Productions
- Release date: November 1, 1930
- Running time: 57 minutes
- Country: United States
- Language: English

Headin' North is a 1930 American pre-Code Western film written and directed by John P. McCarthy.

== Cast ==
- Bob Steele as Jim Curtis
- Barbara Luddy as Mary Jackson
- Perry Murdock as "Snicker" Kimball
- Walter Shumway as Arnold/Stanton
- Eddie Dunn as the announcer
- Fred Burns as U. S. marshal
- Gordon De Main as Foreman
- Harry Allen
- Gunnis Davis as Smith & Smith
- S. S. Simon as the palace owner
- Jim Welsh as the Old Actor
- Jack Henderson as Drunk
