= Lucky Larrigan =

1932 film

- Theatrical release poster
- Directed by: John P. McCarthy
- Screenplay by: John P. McCarthy; Wellyn Totman
- Produced by: Trem Carr
- Starring: Rex Bell; Helen Foster; Stanley Blystone; Julian Rivero; John Elliott; Gordon De Main
- Cinematography: Archie Stout
- Edited by: Carl Pierson
- Production company: Monogram Pictures
- Distributed by: Monogram Pictures
- Release date: December 1, 1932
- Running time: 62 minutes
- Country: United States
- Language: English

Lucky Larrigan is a 1932 American Western film directed by John P. McCarthy and written by McCarthy and Wellyn Totman. The film stars Rex Bell, Helen Foster, Stanley Blystone, Julian Rivero, John Elliott and Gordon De Main. The film was released on December 1, 1932, by Monogram Pictures.

== Cast ==
- Rex Bell as Craig Larrigan
- Helen Foster as Virginia Bailey
- Stanley Blystone as Kirk Warren
- Julian Rivero as Pedro
- John Elliott as J. C. Bailey
- Gordon De Main as Sheriff Jim
- Wilfred Lucas as John Larrigan
- George Chesebro as Mike
