= God's Country and the Man =

God's Country and the Man may refer to:

- God's Country and the Man (1937 film), an American Western film
- God's Country and the Man (1931 film), an American Western film
