= Making a Man =

1922 film by Joseph Henabery

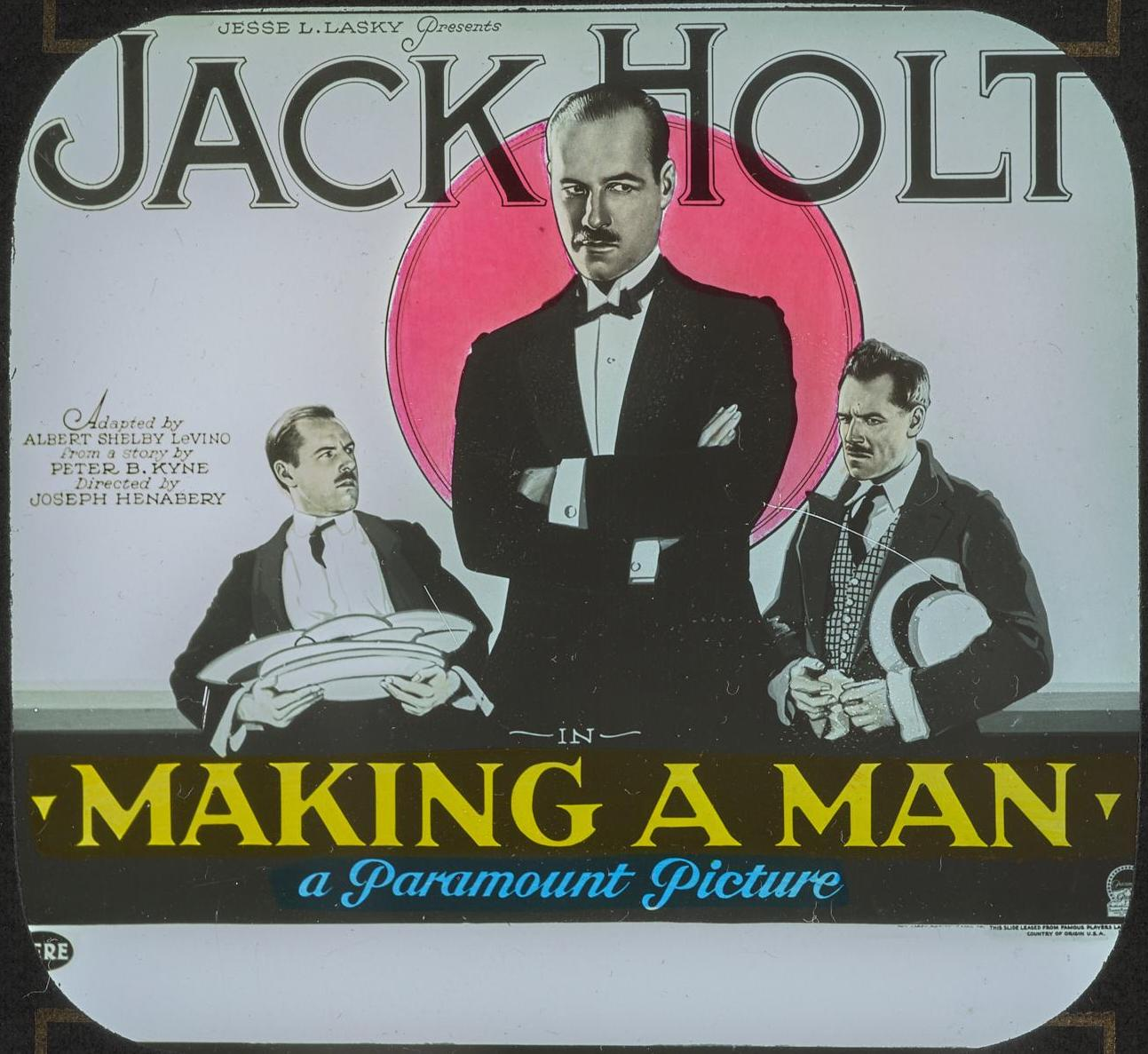
- Lantern slide
- Directed by: Joseph Henabery
- Written by: Albert S. Le Vino (scenario)
- Based on: "Humanizing Mr. Winsby" by Peter B. Kyne
- Produced by: Adolph Zukor; Jesse L. Lasky
- Starring: Jack Holt
- Cinematography: Faxon M. Dean
- Distributed by: Paramount Pictures
- Release date: December 17, 1922
- Running time: 6 reels
- Country: United States
- Language: Silent (English intertitles)

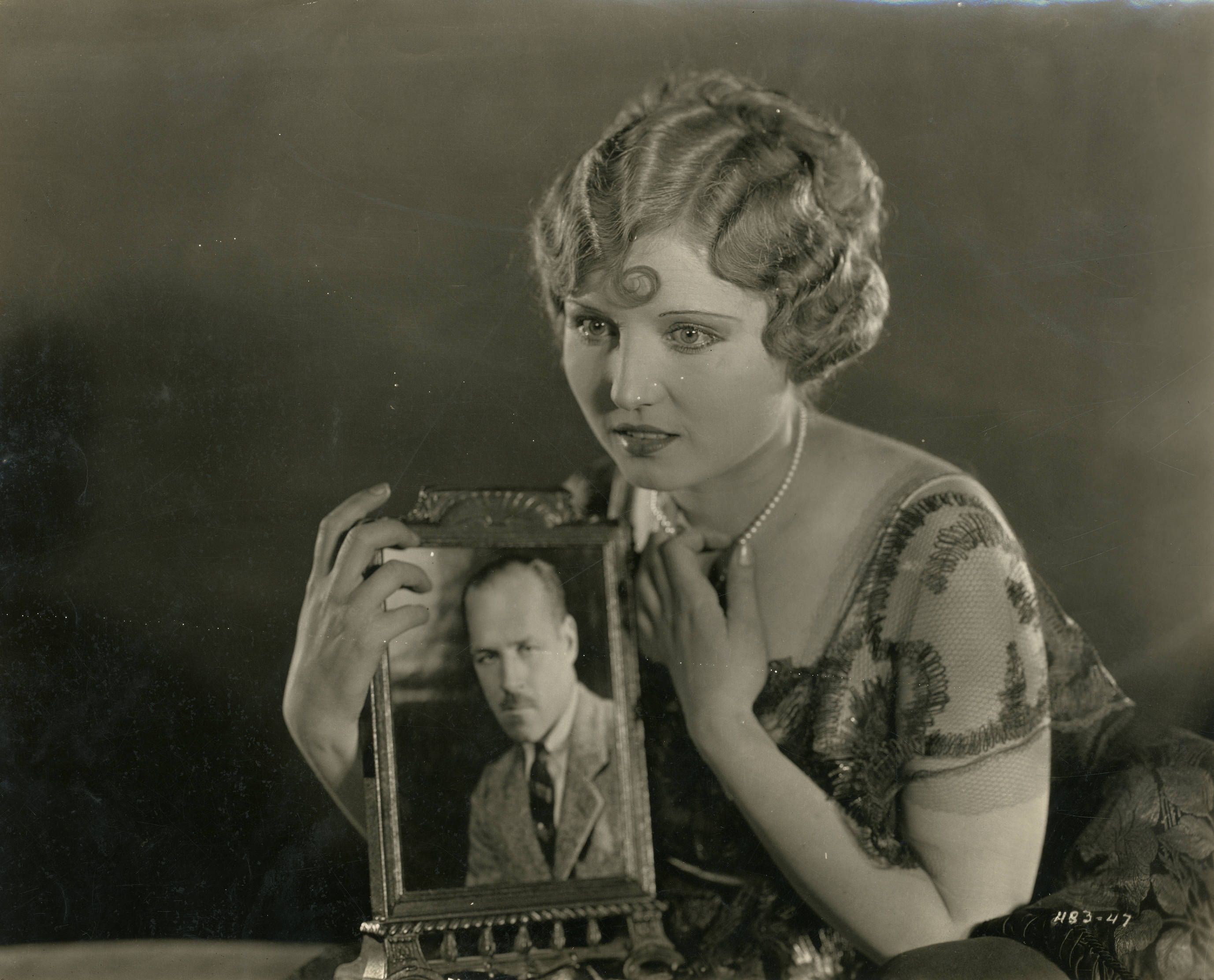
Eva Novak in the film

Making a Man is a 1922 American silent drama film produced by Adolph Zukor and Jesse L. Lasky, distributed by Paramount Pictures, and directed by Joseph Henabery. Starring Jack Holt, the film is based on the Peter B. Kyne story "Humanizing Mr. Winsby".

== Plot ==
As described in a film magazine, small town millionaire and snob Horace Winsby finds himself in love with his neighbor's daughter Patricia Owens, who has just returned from finishing school. He boasts of his wealth and takes it for granted that she will marry him, but instead she refuses him and says that no woman would marry him. Horace feels highly insulted and, in a rage, he forecloses on all the mortgages he holds. The farmers join forces and go to his office and demand additional time to pay. Horace is threatened and his bank manager advises him to leave town at once until the matter blows over. He goes to New York City and stays at an expensive hotel. During his stay, some crooks steal his wallet. Returning to the hotel, he is presented with the week's account but is unable to pay. He tries to wire for money but the hotel refuses him credit for the message, and he is put out into the street. In the park a bum named Shorty acquaints him with the ways of those down and out. He gets a job as a waiter and is there discovered by Patricia and her father Jim during their visit to New York City. Patricia realizes that he has become a man and accepts his marriage proposal this time.

== Cast ==
- Jack Holt as Horace Winsby
- J. P. Lockney as Jim Owens
- Eva Novak as Patricia Owens
- Bert Woodruff as Henry Cattermole
- Frank Nelson as Shorty
- Robert Dudley as Bailey

== Preservation status ==
Making a Man is now considered to be a lost film.
