= The Lovelorn =

1927 film

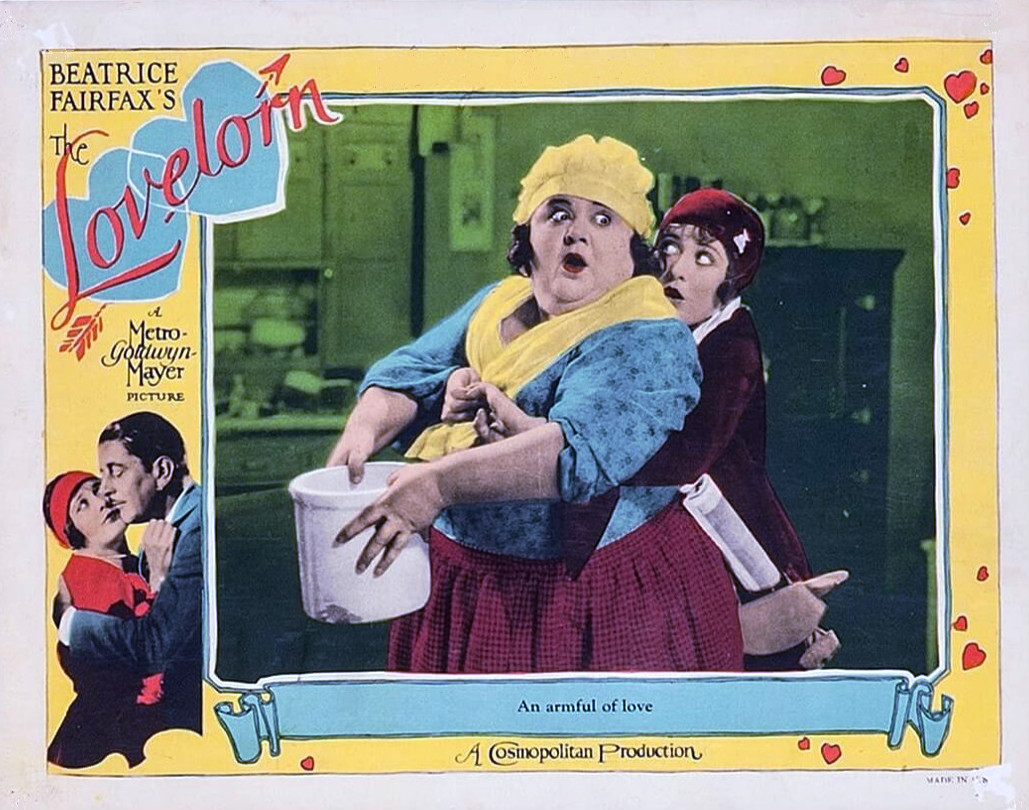
- Lobby card
- Directed by: John P. McCarthy
- Screenplay by: Frederic Hatton; Bradley King
- Story by: Beatrice Fairfax
- Starring: Sally O'Neil; Molly O'Day; Larry Kent; James Murray; Charles Delaney
- Cinematography: Henry Sharp
- Edited by: John English
- Production company: Cosmopolitan Productions
- Distributed by: Metro-Goldwyn-Mayer
- Release date: December 17, 1927
- Running time: 70 minutes
- Country: United States
- Language: Silent (English intertitles)

The Lovelorn is a 1927 American silent drama film directed by John P. McCarthy and written by Frederic Hatton and Bradley King. The film stars Sally O'Neil, Molly O'Day, Larry Kent, James Murray, and Charles Delaney. The film was released on December 17, 1927, by Metro-Goldwyn-Mayer.

== Cast ==
- Sally O'Neil as Georgie Hastings
- Molly O'Day as Ann Hastings
- Larry Kent as Bill Warren
- James Murray as Charlie
- Charles Delaney as Jimmy
- George Cooper as Joe Sprotte
- Allan Forrest as Ernest Brooks
- Dorothy Cumming as Beatrice Fairfax
- Isabelle Noonan as Young girl (uncredited)
