= Diamond Handcuffs =

1928 film

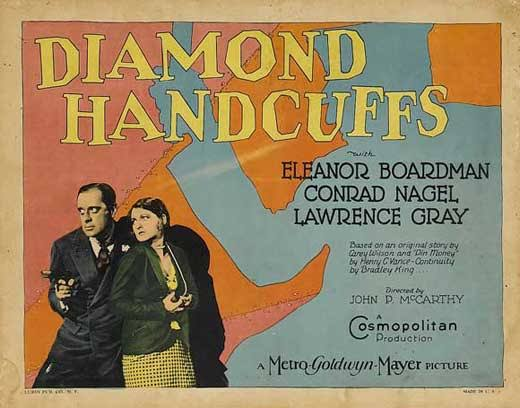
- Directed by: John P. McCarthy
- Screenplay by: Joseph Farnham; Willis Goldbeck; Bradley King
- Story by: Henry C. Vance; Carey Wilson
- Starring: Eleanor Boardman; Lawrence Gray; Sam Hardy; Gwen Lee; Lena Malena
- Cinematography: Henry Sharp
- Edited by: Sam Zimbalist
- Production company: Cosmopolitan Productions
- Distributed by: Metro-Goldwyn-Mayer
- Release date: May 5, 1928
- Running time: 70 minutes
- Country: United States
- Language: English

Diamond Handcuffs is a 1928 American drama silent film directed by John P. McCarthy and written by Joseph Farnham, Willis Goldbeck and Bradley King. The film stars Eleanor Boardman, Lawrence Gray, Sam Hardy, Gwen Lee and Lena Malena. The film was released on May 5, 1928, by Metro-Goldwyn-Mayer.

== Cast ==
- Eleanor Boardman as Tillie
- Lawrence Gray as Larry
- Sam Hardy as Spike
- Gwen Lee as Cecile
- Lena Malena as Musa
- Conrad Nagel as John
- John Roche as Jerry Fontaine
- Charles Stevens as Niambo
