= The Deceiver (film) =

1931 film

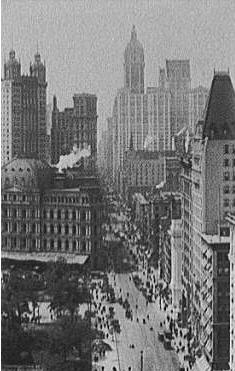
- Broadway
- Directed by: Louis King
- Written by: Jack Cunningham (script); Abem Finkel and Bella Muni (original short story)
- Starring: Lloyd Hughes; Dorothy Sebastian; Ian Keith
- Cinematography: Joseph Walker
- Edited by: Gene Havlick
- Distributed by: Columbia Pictures
- Release date: November 21, 1931
- Running time: 66 minutes
- Country: United States
- Language: English

The Deceiver is a 1931 American pre-Code mystery film directed by Louis King. It was written by Jack Cunningham, based on a short story called "It Might Have Happened" by Bella Muni and Abem Finkel. The film stars Lloyd Hughes, Ian Keith and Dorothy Sebastian. John Wayne makes a minor appearance as a stand-in playing Ian Keith's corpse. It featured songs and tap dance numbers in an act billed as "Hot Harlem". The film premiered on November 21, 1931. Despite it being considered a lost film, it was announced that the only copy is in the Library of Congress.

== Plot ==
Broadway matinee idol, Shakespearean actor Reginald Thorpe, is found dead in his dressing room on the eve of his departure for Hollywood. Thorpe's understudy, Tony Hill, is suspected, particularly in light of his skill with knives. Thorpe, however, was a lady's man who seems to have been involved in blackmailing one of his lovers.

== Cast ==
- Lloyd Hughes as Tony Hill
- Dorothy Sebastian as Ina Fontanne
- Ian Keith as Reginald Thorpe
- Natalie Moorhead as Mrs. Lawton
- Richard Tucker as Mr. Lawton
- George Byron as Speedy
- Greta Granstedt as Celia Adams
- Murray Kinnell as Breckinridge
- DeWitt Jennings as Inspector Dunn
- Al Ernest Garcia as Payne
- Harvey Clark as Nat Phillips
- Sidney Bracey as Barney
- Frank Holliday as Thomas
- Colin Campbell as Dr. Schulz
- Nick Copeland as Stage manager
- John Wayne as Reginald Thorpe as a corpse

== See also ==
- List of American films of 1931
