= The Return of Casey Jones =

1933 film by John P. McCarthy

- Directed by: John P. McCarthy
- Produced by: I. E. Chadwik
- Starring: Charles Starrett; Ruth Hall
- Production company: Monogram Pictures
- Distributed by: Monogram Pictures
- Release date: May 25, 1933
- Running time: 67 minutes
- Country: United States
- Language: English

The Return of Casey Jones is a 1933 American Pre-Code action adventure film directed by John P. McCarthy, written by Harry L. Fraser and starring Charles Starrett and Ruth Hall. The film is based on the story of the same name by John Johns, published in the April 1933 issue of Railroad Stories magazine (reprinted in 2019 by Bold Venture Press in their Railroad Stories reprint collection). The film was a Monogram Pictures Corporation production.

== Plot ==
A young boy named Jimmy is devastated after learning of the death of famed train engineer Casey Jones with whom he was good friends. In the following years, he grows up to be a train engineer, too. One morning, as Jimmy is piloting his train the brakes lose their air pressure, and the train roars along unable to be slowed or stopped. Jimmy tells the mechanic to fix it, but knowing that there is a sharp curve coming up soon and that the train will go off the tracks the mechanic jumps off the train instead. Jimmy then grabs a wrench and climbs out onto the side of the engine to try to fix it himself, but while stretching to reach the loose hose connection he is jostled and falls off the train just moments before it goes off the tracks at the curve. Unfortunately, gossip around town is that Jimmy jumped off his train two and a half miles before the curve, which was untrue, and he is branded a coward. Worse, he did not let other trains know, and as a result he is let go as engineer. The fact that Jimmy did not sign up and volunteer for army duty, as many other boys did at the time, also rankled many and added heavily to the idea that he was a coward. Actually, he had planned to sign up, but his mother had a heart attack and the doctor told him if he did his mother would likely have another heart attack and it would be fatal this time. One of Jimmy's closest coworkers, who trusts him implicitly and doesn't believe the gossip, convinces the railroad to rehire him, though they will not make him an engineer again. The best they offer is a position as fireman on the train engineered by his friend (who humbly denies to Jimmy that he had anything to do with getting him back in).

One dark night as their train is roaring along it loses its air pressure the same way Jimmy's had before. The engineer stoically – or more likely in shock – stands mute at the controls prepared to go all the way with the train, but Jimmy grabs a wrench and climbs out onto the engine to fix it. He succeeds and then carries the limp engineer off the train. After that he is re-branded as a hero and offered his old position as engineer again.

== Cast ==
- Charles Starrett – Jim Martin
- Ruth Hall – Nona Winters
- George "Gabby" Hayes – Timothy Shine
- Robert Elliott – Casey Jones
- Margaret Seddon – Mrs. Mary Martin
- Jackie Searl – Jimmy Martin as a Boy
- George Walsh – Wild Bill Bronson
- Gordon De Main – Ike MacFarland
