= Eddie Dunn (actor) =

American actor (1896–1951)

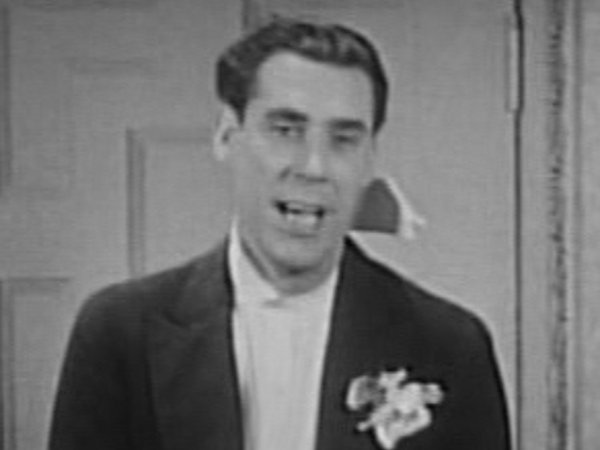
- Eddie Dunn in Introducing Harry Langdon in 1929.
- Born: Edward Frank Dunn; March 31, 1896; New York City, U.S.
- Died: May 5, 1951 (aged 55); Los Angeles, California, U.S.
- Occupation: Actor
- Years active: 1915–1951

Edward Frank Dunn (March 31, 1896 – May 5, 1951) was an American actor best known for his roles in comedy films, supporting many comedians such as Charley Chase (with whom he co-directed several short films), Charlie Chaplin, W. C. Fields and Laurel and Hardy.

As a high school student in Waco, Texas, Dunn began performing with some fellow students on a local radio station.

He broke into films with the Vitagraph studio in 1915, working with the studio's star comedians Mr. and Mrs. Sidney Drew and Larry Semon. By 1927 he was working with stop-motion animator Charley Bowers at Educational Pictures, as a supporting player in Bowers's live-action comedies.

In 1929 his career took a decided turn for the better when he signed with the Hal Roach studio. He became a member of the Roach stock company, appearing prominently in short subjects and featurettes starring Laurel and Hardy, Thelma Todd, and Charley Chase. Dunn and Chase worked so closely that Dunn was allowed to co-direct six Chase shorts.

The affable Eddie Dunn was an all-purpose talent: he could play butlers, bandleaders, radio announcers, cab drivers, waiters, soldiers, and sailors. He was often cast as an authority figure opposite the Roach comedians—a policeman or detective—which led to more work in feature films. He began freelancing at various studios in 1933, playing character roles in hundreds of feature films. He had recurring featured roles in RKO's Mexican Spitfire series (as a sneaky advertising executive) and in The Falcon series (as a plainclothes detective). Today's audiences may know him as a storm trooper confronting Charlie Chaplin in The Great Dictator (1940), an unfortunate chauffeur trying to repair a car in the W.C. Fields feature The Bank Dick (1940), the policeman arresting Laurel and Hardy in Nothing but Trouble, or the bartender in Mighty Joe Young.

Like many movie character players, Dunn also worked in radio and later in television. Dunn hosted the radio quiz show True or False and was the announcer on The Jack Berch Show. This led to other TV assignments as a master of ceremonies in the very early days of the medium: Spin the Picture, Leave It to the Girls and Face to Face. He appeared in a 1950 episode of the TV series, The Lone Ranger, "Man Without a Gun".

Eddie Dunn worked steadily in motion pictures and broadcasting until his death in 1951.

== Selected filmography ==
- The Vanishing Vault (1915, Short)
- The Shop Girl (1916) - Floorwalker
- My Own United States (1918) - Gen. Wilkinson
- The Moonshine Trail (1919) - Eddie Cassidy
- Dawn (1919) - John McGuire
- The Blood Barrier (1920) - Eddie Brown
- The Sorrows of Satan (1926) - Marriage Clerk (uncredited)
- The Road to Ruin (1928) - Strip Poker Player
- The Fleet's In (1928) - Al Pearce
- The Saturday Night Kid (1929) - Jim (uncredited)
- The Hoose-Gow (1929, Short) - Prisoner (uncredited)
- True to the Navy (1930) - Albert
- The Land of Missing Men (1930) - Sheriff Bower
- Headin' North (1930) - Palace Master of Ceremonies
- Another Fine Mess (1930, Short) - Meadows (uncredited)
- The Gang Buster (1931) - Cab Driver (uncredited)
- Finn and Hattie (1931) - N. Y. Taxi Driver
- The Sunrise Trail (1931) - Rand Kennedy
- June Moon (1931) - Joe McCloskey
- Riders of the North (1931) - Tim 'Mac' McGuire
- Pardon Us (1931) - Insurgent Convict (uncredited)
- South of Santa Fe (1932) - Lankey
- What Price Hollywood? (1932) - Doorman at Grauman's Theater (uncredited)
- Million Dollar Legs (1932) - Coachman / Guard (uncredited)
- Me and My Pal (1933, Short) - Cab driver (uncredited)
- Private Detective 62 (1933) - Doorman (uncredited)
- The Midnight Patrol (1933, Short) - Police Sergeant (uncredited)
- Voice in the Night (1934) - Henchman (uncredited)
- Let Freedom Ring (1939)
- The Bank Dick (1940)
- The Great Dictator (1940)
- Hello, Frisco, Hello (1943)
- The Falcon in Danger (1943) - Det. Grimes
- San Diego, I Love You (1944)
- Nothing but Trouble (1944)
- Curley (1947)
- Call Northside 777 (1948)
- The Big Punch (1948)
- The Checkered Coat (1948)
- I Shot Jesse James (1949)
- Buckaroo Sheriff of Texas (1951)
