= The Western Code =

1932 film

The Texas Code
- Directed by: John P. McCarthy
- Written by: Milton Krims
- Starring: Tim McCoy; Nora Lane; Mischa Auer
- Distributed by: Columbia Pictures
- Release date: September 16, 1932
- Running time: 58 minutes
- Country: United States
- Language: English

The Western Code is a 1932 American Western film directed by John P. McCarthy and starring Tim McCoy, Nora Lane, and Mischa Auer.

The film contains the first known instance of the phrase "This town ain't big enough for the both of us" in popular media.

== Cast ==
- Tim McCoy as Tim Barrett
- Nora Lane as Polly Lewis
- Mischa Auer as Chapman
- Dwight Frye as Dick Lewis
- Wheeler Oakman as Nick Grindell
- Matthew Betz as Warden
- Gordon De Main as Sheriff Fred Purdy
- Jack Kirk as Deputy Chuck
- Bud Osborne as Dutch Miller
