= The Ridin' Fool =

1931 film

- Directed by: John P. McCarthy
- Written by: Wellyn Totman
- Produced by: Trem Carr
- Cinematography: Archie Stout
- Edited by: Charles Hunt
- Distributed by: Tiffany Productions, Inc.
- Release date: May 25, 1931 (US)
- Running time: 58 or 64 minutes
- Country: United States
- Language: English

The Ridin' Fool is a 1931 American pre-Code Western film directed by John P. McCarthy and written by Wellyn Totman. Produced by Trem Carr, the film was released on May 25, 1931 by Tiffany Productions, Inc.

== Plot ==
Although innocent, gambler Boston Harry is scheduled to be hanged by vigilantes for the murder of Jim Beckworth. Boston's friend, cowboy Steve Kendall, rescues him, even though they are both in love with Juanita, a half-Mexican woman, who transfers her allegiance to whoever has the most money, leading to a dispute between the two.

== Cast ==
- Bob Steele as Steve Kendall
- Frances Morris as Sally Warren
- Florence Turner as Ma Warren
- Ted Adams as Boston Harry
- Alan Bridge as Nikkos
- Eddie Fetherston as Bud Warren
- Jack Henderson as Col. Butterfield
- Gordon De Main as Sheriff Anderson
- Josephine Velez as Juanita
- Fern Emmett as Miss Scully
