= Trailing North =

1933 film directed by John P. McCarthy

- Directed by: John P. McCarthy
- Written by: John Morgan; Harry Jones
- Cinematography: Faxon Dean
- Edited by: Carl Pierson
- Production company: Monogram Pictures
- Distributed by: Monogram Pictures
- Release date: 1933
- Running time: 57 minutes
- Country: United States
- Language: English

Trailing North is a 1933 pre-Code American western drama film directed by John P. McCarthy. It was released in 1933 in the US by Monogram Pictures.

== Cast ==
- Bob Steele as Lee Evans
- Doris Hill as Mitzi
- Arthur Rankin as Lucky
- George Hayes as "Flash" Ryan
- Norman Fensier as Chief
- Fred Burns as Jim Powers
- Frances Morris as the girl at the 1st Outpost

== See also ==
- Bob Steele filmography
