= Crashin' Broadway =

1933 film directed by John P. McCarthy

- Theatrical release poster
- Directed by: John P. McCarthy
- Written by: Wellyn Totman
- Produced by: Trem Carr; Paul Malvern
- Cinematography: Faxon M. Dean
- Edited by: Carl Pierson
- Production company: Monogram Pictures
- Distributed by: Monogram Pictures
- Release date: June 1, 1933
- Running time: 59 minutes
- Country: United States
- Language: English

Crashin' Broadway (also known as Crashing Broadway) is a 1933 American Western film directed by John P. McCarthy and written by Wellyn Totman.

== Cast ==
- Rex Bell as Tad Wallace
- Doris Hill as Sally Sunshine
- Harry Bowen as Fred Storm
- George Hayes as J. Talbot Thorndyke
- Charles King as Gus Jeffries
- Henry Roquemore as Levi
- Lewis Sargent as John Griswold
- Vera Calbert as Mrs. Pinkham
- George Morrell as Ernie Tupper
- Perry Murdock as Eddie Tupper
