= Faxon M. Dean =

American cinematographer

- Born: Faxon Martin Dean; May 26, 1890; Guyton, Georgia, U.S.
- Died: May 25, 1965 (aged 74); Sunnyvale, California, U.S.
- Occupation: Cinematographer

Faxon M. Dean (1890-1965) was an American cinematographer who worked in Hollywood primarily during the silent era. He worked on many of director Charles Maigne's films, and was Mary Miles Minter's personal cameraman for a time.

== Biography ==
Faxon was born in Guyton, Georgia, on May 26, 1890. His parents were Herbert Dean and Amelia Warmsley. He married Margaret Hurley, and the pair had two children together. He got his professional career as a newspaper photographer before trying his hand as a cinematographer in 1911. He was an early member of the American Society of Cinematographers.

== Selected filmography ==
- The Marcellini Millions (1917)
- A Roadside Impresario (1917)
- The Cook of Canyon Camp (1917)
- Lost in Transit (1917)
- The Countess Charming (1917)
- The Clever Mrs. Carfax (1917)
- Jules of the Strong Heart (1918)
- Rimrock Jones (1918)
- The Invisible Bond (1919)
- The Copperhead (1920)
- The Fighting Chance (1920)
- A Cumberland Romance (1920)
- Frontier of the Stars (1921)
- All Souls' Eve (1921)
- The Little Clown (1921)
- Don't Call Me Little Girl (1921)
- Moonlight and Honeysuckle (1921)
- Her Winning Way (1921)
- The Call of the North (1921)
- Her Own Money (1922)
- North of the Rio Grande (1922)
- While Satan Sleeps (1922)
- The Man Unconquerable (1922)
- The Cowboy and the Lady (1922)
- Making a Man (1922)
- The Tiger's Claw (1923)
- Sixty Cents an Hour (1923)
- A Gentleman of Leisure (1923)
- Stephen Steps Out (1923)
- The Stranger (1924)
- The Guilty One (1924)
- Tongues of Flame (1924)
- Coming Through (1925)
- Every Man's Wife (1925)
- Lord Jim (1925)
- Braveheart (1925)
- The Sporting Lover (1926)
- The False Alarm (1926)
- Fools of Fashion (1926)
- Baby Mine (1928)
- The Tragedy of Youth (1928)
- Their Hour (1928)
- The Olympic Hero (1928)
- Romance of a Rogue (1928)
- The Look Out Girl (1928)
- Jazzland (1928)
- The Tragedy of Youth (1928)
- Fast Life (1929)
- Little Johnny Jones (1929)
- The Nevada Buckaroo (1931)
- Texas Pioneers (1932)
- Crashin' Broadway (1932)
- Breed of the Border (1933)
- Diamond Trail (1933)
- Trailing North (1933)
- The Gallant Fool (1933)
- One Year Later (1933)
