= The Devil's Masterpiece =

1927 film directed by John P. McCarthy

- Directed by: John P. McCarthy
- Written by: Mason Harbringer
- Produced by: Sanford F. Arnold
- Starring: Virginia Brown Faire; Gordon Brinkley; Fred Kohler
- Cinematography: H. Lyman Broening
- Distributed by: Goodwill Distributing
- Release date: 1927
- Running time: 59 minutes
- Country: United States
- Languages: Silent; English intertitles

The Devil's Masterpiece is a 1927 American silent melodrama film directed by John P. McCarthy from a story by Mason Harbringer.

== Cast ==
- Virginia Brown Faire
- Gordon Brinkley
- Fred Kohler as Reckless Jim Regan

== Release ==
The film was released in the United Kingdom in October 1926, and in the United States in 1927.
