= Marked Trails =

1944 film by John P. McCarthy

- Directed by: John P. McCarthy
- Screenplay by: John P. McCarthy (story); Victor Hammond
- Produced by: William Strohbach (supervising producer)
- Starring: Hoot Gibson; Bob Steele
- Cinematography: Harry Neumann
- Edited by: John C. Fuller
- Music by: Frank Sanucci
- Distributed by: Monogram Pictures
- Release date: July 29, 1944
- Running time: 58 minutes
- Country: United States
- Language: English

Marked Trails is a 1944 American Western film directed by John P. McCarthy.

== Plot ==
Bob Stevens (Bob Steele) is a young man living in the old west who wants to get out and see the world before he has to settle down and live responsibly. His uncle Harry (Steve Clark), a deputy marshal of the town of Tracy, wants Bob to take up that line of work, which Bob initially refuses. But then Harry recognizes wanted gang members Jack Slade (Mauritz Hugo) and Mary Conway, alias Blanche (Veda Ann Borg), and is murdered by them as he tries to order them out of town. Seeking justice, Bob then joins the U.S. Marshals after all, along with his friend, Parkford (Hoot Gibson). Arriving in Tracy, Bob poses as a trouble-making criminal in order to be recruited to join Slade's gang, which Hoot separately comes to town in the guise of a "dude," a more cultured speech-maker in the name of law and order. In the end, the criminals are discovered and defeated in a shootout.

This plot summary appeared in The Motion Picture Herald:

Hoot and Bob meet a young couple who, although masquerading as respectable citizens, are in reality the leaders of a notorious gang. There have been several stagecoach robberies near the town, as well as killings and miscellaneous gunplay. Hoot and Bob set out to clean up the place, and in the course of events foil another stagecoach robbery and unmask the gang leaders.

== Cast ==
- Hoot Gibson as Hoot Parkford
- Bob Steele as Bob Stevens
- Veda Ann Borg as Blanche / Mary Conway
- Ralph Lewis as Henchman Jed
- Mauritz Hugo as Jim Slade
- Charles Stevens as Henchman Denver
- Bud Osborne as Sheriff Jim
- Lynton Brent as Henchman Tex
- George Morrell as Whippletree, Livery man
- Allen D. Sewall as Hank Bradley
