= The Nevada Buckaroo =

1931 film

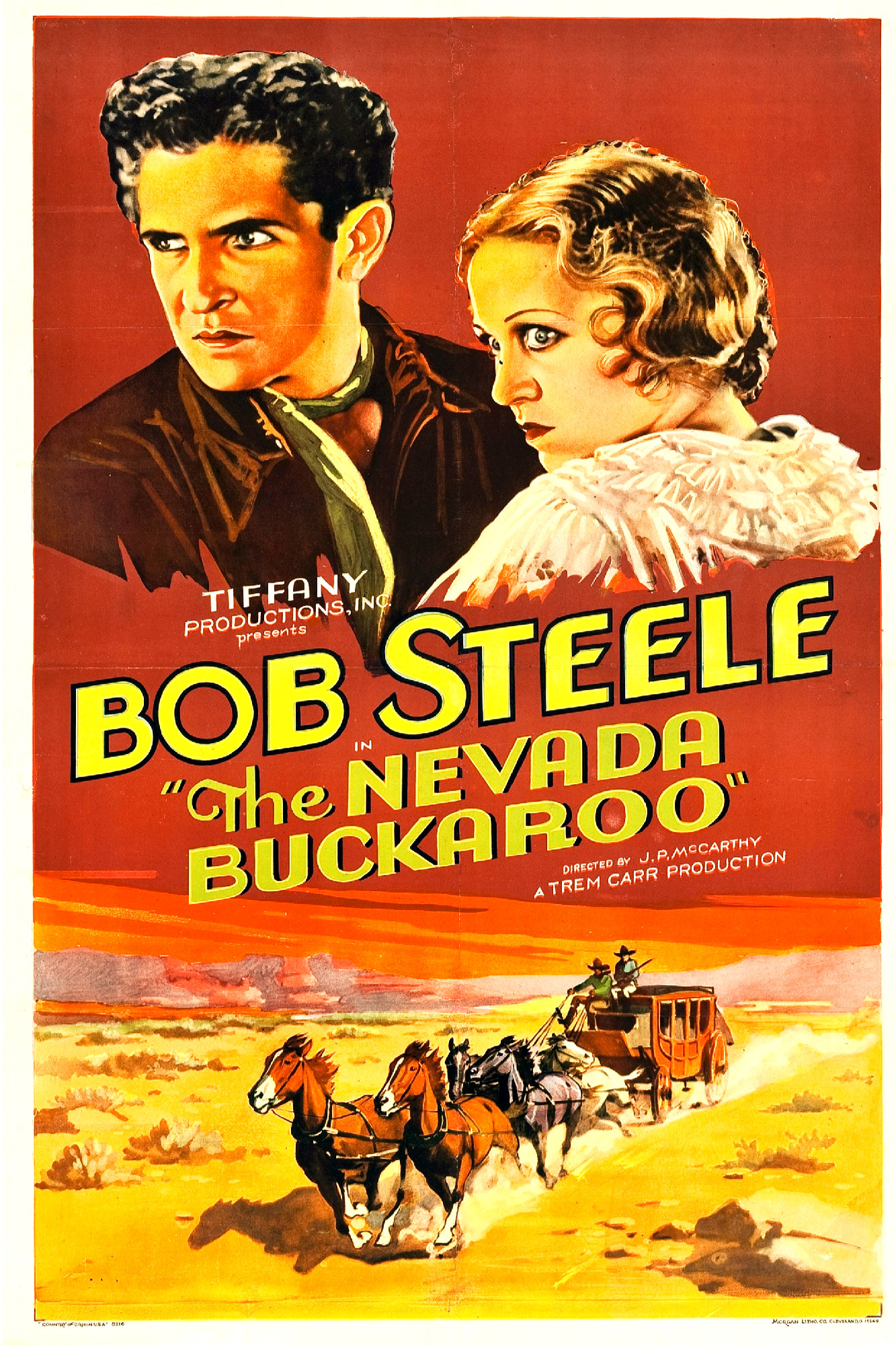
- Film poster
- Directed by: John P. McCarthy
- Written by: Wellyn Totman (story and scenario)
- Produced by: Trem Carr (producer)
- Starring: See below
- Cinematography: Faxon M. Dean
- Edited by: Leonard Wheeler
- Distributed by: Tiffany Pictures
- Release date: September 27, 1931
- Running time: 59 minutes
- Country: United States
- Language: English

The Nevada Buckaroo is a 1931 American Western film directed by John P. McCarthy.

== Cast ==
- Bob Steele as Buck Hurley, known as The Nevada Kid
- Dorothy Dix as JoAnn
- Ed Brady as Henchman Slade
- George "Gabby" Hayes as Cherokee Williams
- Glen Cavender as Sheriff Hank
- Billy Engle as The stutterer
- Artie Ortego as Alex the stage driver
- Rico Suave as the Token Mexican

== See also ==
- Bob Steele filmography
