= Fred Burns (actor) =

American actor

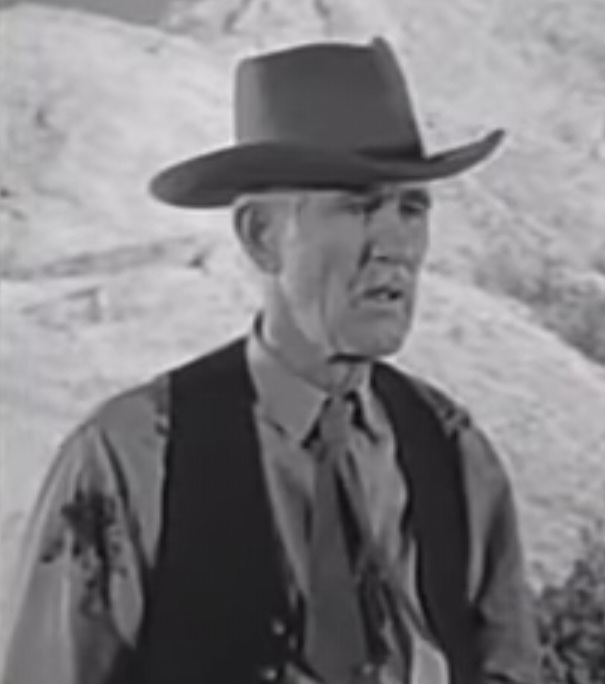
- Burns in Sunset on the Desert (1942)
- Born: April 24, 1878; Fort Keogh, Montana, U.S.
- Died: July 18, 1955 (aged 77); Los Angeles, California, U.S.
- Occupation: Film actor
- Years active: 1912–1948

Fred Burns (April 24, 1878 – July 18, 1955) was an American actor who mainly appeared in Western films. He appeared in over 265 films before his death in 1955.

== Biography ==
Fred Burns was born on April 24, 1878, in Fort Keogh, Montana. For six years, he was in charge of Buffalo Bill Cody's ranch near Cheyenne, Wyoming. He "broke" wild mustangs for Buffalo Bill's Wild West Show. He traveled with Buffalo Bill's Wild West show, and later with the 101 Ranch Wild West Show. Burns was a roping champion for five years in the early 1900s.

By 1916, he had moved to Hollywood to work in movies full-time. He appeared in 23 movies between 1921 and 1930, and 91 movies during the sound era. He also was in charge of the stock at Fine Arts Studios.

Burns died in Los Angeles, California, on July 18, 1955, at age 77.

== Partial filmography ==
- During the Round-Up (1913) as the Foreman
- An Indian's Loyalty (1913) as the Ranch Hand
- Jordan Is a Hard Road (1915)
- Sold for Marriage (1916)
- The Good Bad-Man (1916) as the Sheriff
- The Hero of the Hour (1917)
- The Fighting Trail (1917)
- Sunlight's Last Raid (1917)
- Bound in Morocco (1918)
- Ruth of the Rockies (1920)
- Shadows of Conscience (1921)
- Cyclone Jones (1923)
- Breed of the Border (1924)
- Wild West (1925)
- Speed Wild (1925)
- The Unknown Cavalier (1926)
- The Outlaw Express (1926)
- Wild to Go (1926)
- The Windjammer (1926)
- Set Free (1927)
- The Galloping Gobs (1927)
- Tide of Empire (1929)
- Queen of the Northwoods (1929)
- Border Romance (1929)
- Points West (1929)
- The Mounted Stranger (1930)
- Men Without Law (1930)
- The Utah Kid (1930)
- Breed of the West (1930)
- Branded (1931)
- Freighters of Destiny (1931)
- The Texas Tornado (1932)
- Trailing North (1933)
- The Dude Bandit (1933)
- War of the Range (1933)
- Lawless Range (1935)
- The Law of 45's (1935)
- Oh, Susanna! (1936)
- Springtime in the Rockies (1937)
- Trailin' Trouble (1937)
- Call of the Rockies (1938)
- Days of Jesse James (1939)
- Thundering Frontier (1940)
- Colorado (1940)
- Carolina Moon (1940)
- Man from Cheyenne (1942)
- Sons of the Pioneers (1942)
- Silver River (1948)
