= The Lawyer's Secret =

1931 film

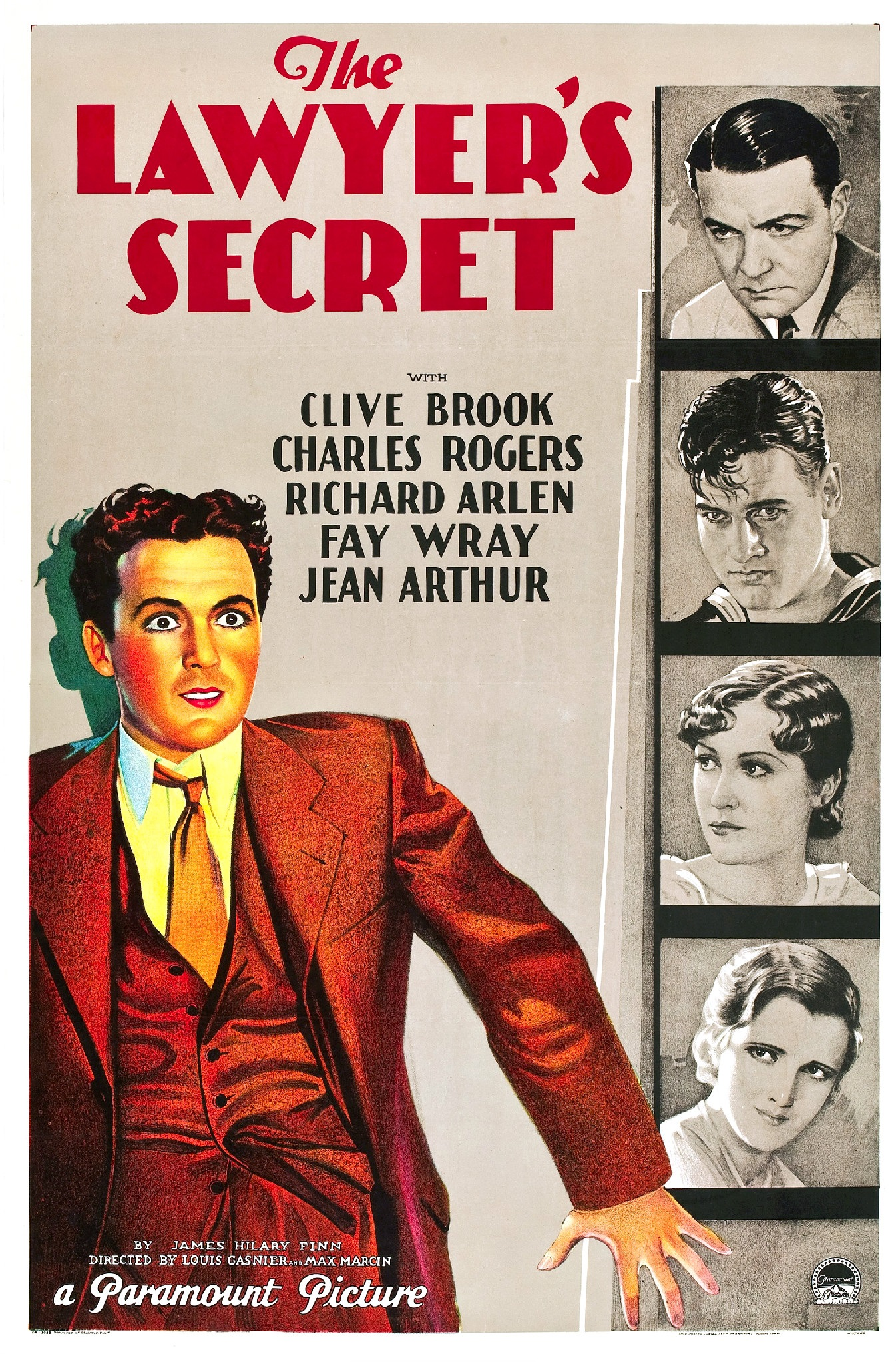
- Theatrical release poster
- Directed by: Louis J. Gasnier; Max Marcin
- Screenplay by: Lloyd Corrigan; James Hilary Finn; Max Marcin
- Produced by: Adolph Zukor
- Starring: Clive Brook; Charles "Buddy" Rogers; Richard Arlen; Fay Wray; Jean Arthur; Francis McDonald; Harold Goodwin
- Cinematography: Arthur L. Todd
- Music by: Jay Gorney
- Production company: Paramount Pictures
- Distributed by: Paramount Pictures
- Release date: June 6, 1931
- Running time: 70 minutes
- Country: United States
- Language: English

The Lawyer's Secret is a 1931 American pre-Code crime film directed by Louis J. Gasnier and Max Marcin and written by Lloyd Corrigan, James Hilary Finn, and Max Marcin. The film stars Clive Brook, Charles "Buddy" Rogers, Richard Arlen, Fay Wray, Jean Arthur, Francis McDonald, and Harold Goodwin. The film was released on June 6, 1931, by Paramount Pictures.

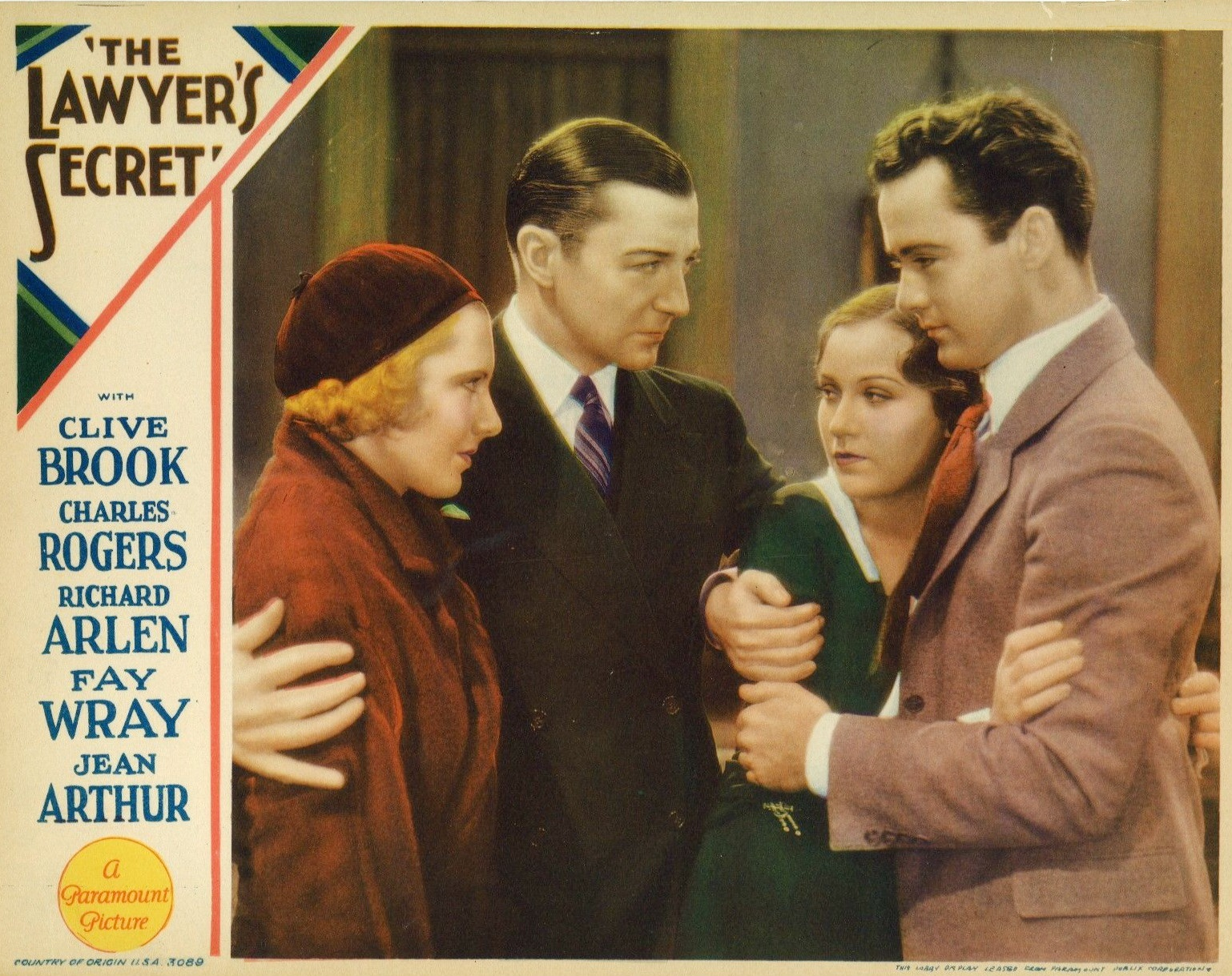
Lobby card with Jean Arthur, Clive Brook, Fay Wray and Charles "Buddy" Rogers

== Cast ==
- Clive Brook as Drake Norris
- Charles "Buddy" Rogers as Laurie Roberts
- Richard Arlen as Joe Hart
- Fay Wray as Kay Roberts
- Jean Arthur as Beatrice Stevens
- Francis McDonald as The Weasel
- Harold Goodwin as 'Madame X'
- Syd Saylor as Red
- Lawrence LaMarr as Tom
- Sheila Bromley as Madge - Madame X's Girlfriend (uncredited)
- G. Pat Collins as Motorcycle Officer (uncredited)
- Gordon De Main as Detective (uncredited)
- Claire Dodd as Party Guest (uncredited)
- Robert Homans as Chief of Police (uncredited)
- Payne B. Johnson as Baby (uncredited)
- Edward LeSaint as Prison Warden (uncredited)
- Wilbur Mack as Frank - District Attorney (uncredited)
- Guy Oliver as Police Turnkey (uncredited)
- Bob Perry as Baldy (uncredited)
- Hal Price as Detective (uncredited)
- Willard Robertson as Police Desk Sergeant (uncredited)
