= John P. McCarthy =

American film director and screenwriter (1884–1962)

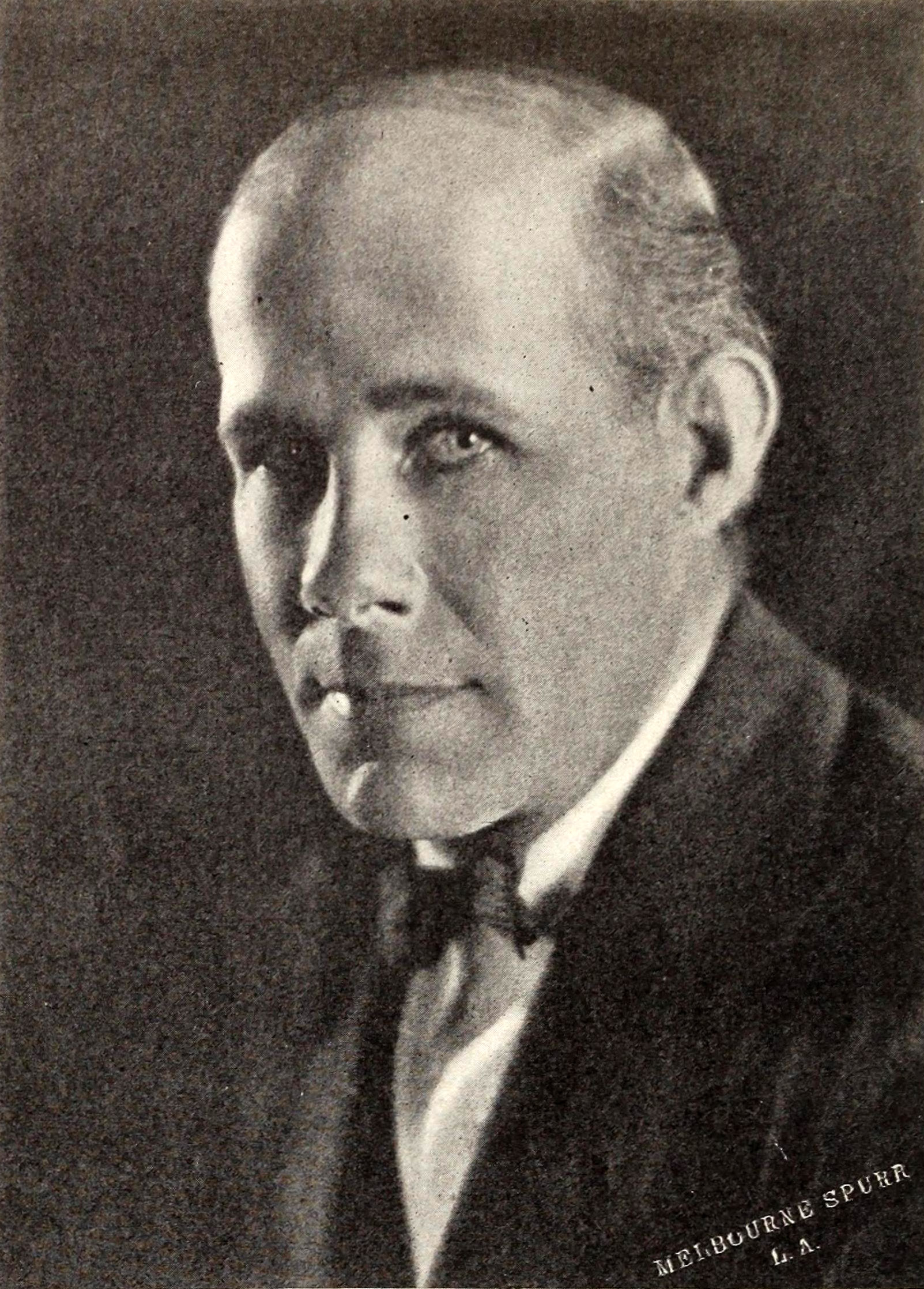
- Born: March 17, 1884; San Francisco, California, U.S.
- Died: September 4, 1962 (aged 78); Pasadena, California, U.S.
- Occupations: Director, screenwriter
- Years active: 1920–1945
- Family: Mary Eunice McCarthy (sister); Francis Joseph McCarty; Henry McCarty (brothers)

John P. McCarthy (March 17, 1884 – September 4, 1962), also known as J.P. McCarthy or simply as John McCarthy, was an American director and screenwriter of the 1920s through 1945. He began in the film industry in front of the camera, as an actor in silent films and film shorts during the 1910s, before moving behind the camera in 1920. He usually directed his own screenplays. Although he directed the occasional drama or comedy, his specialty was the Western, which make up 28 of his 38 filmography entries.

== Life and career ==
John P. McCarthy was born on Saint Patrick's Day 1884 in San Francisco, California to John Henry and Catherine Lynch McCarty. He later changed his last name from "McCarty" to "McCarthy".

His brother, Francis Joseph McCarty, developed an early radiotelephone system, before dying in a 1906 accident. John P. McCarthy continued promotion, but was unsuccessful in marketing this invention, and entered the film industry in 1914. His first part was a small role in the film short The Wireless Voice, which also featured his radio equipment. Over the next four years he appeared in eight films, all but one a short. His one feature was in a small part of a prison guard in the 1916 D. W. Griffith classic, Intolerance.

McCarthy moved behind the camera in 1920, writing, producing and directing Out of the Dust, starring Russell Simpson. He wrote eighteen scripts during his 25-year career, all but four of which he directed himself. McCarthy directed a total of 38 films, 12 of which were silent. His notable silent films include The Lovelorn (1927), and Diamond Handcuffs (1928). Some of his notable sound films include: Oklahoma Cyclone (1930), one of the first "singing cowboy films; The Law of 45's, the forerunner to the Republic Pictures western series The Three Mesquiteers; and 1936's Song of the Gringo, the film debut of Tex Ritter.

His most prolific year was 1931, when he directed eight films, two of which he also wrote: Cavalier of the West and God's Country and the Man. He took a hiatus from the film industry in the early 1940s, before returning in 1944. His final directorial credit was part of The Cisco Kid series, 1945's The Cisco Kid Returns. In 1946 McCarthy wrote the story for the Western, Under Arizona Skies, directed by Lambert Hillyer, which was his final film credit.

== Filmography ==
(Per AFI database)

- The Wireless Voice (1914 – Short) as J.P. McCarthy – actor
- Who Shot Bud Walton? (1914 – Short) as J.P. McCarthy – actor
- The Availing Prayer (1914 – Short) as J.P. McCarthy – actor
- For His Pal (1915 – Short) as J.P. McCarthy – actor
- The Little Orphans (1915 – Short) as J.P. McCarthy – actor
- Jerry's Double Header (1916 – Short) – actor
- Intolerance (1916) as J.P. McCarthy – actor
- The Flying Target (1917 – Short) as J.P. McCarthy – actor
- Out of the Dust (1920) – writer, director, producer
- Shadows of Conscience (1921) – writer, director
- Brand of Cowardice (1925) – writer, director
- Hurricane Hal (1925) – writer
- Pals (1925) – director
- The Border Whirlwind (1926) – director
- Vanishing Hoofs (1926) – director
- His Foreign Wife (1927) – writer, director
- Becky (1927) – director
- The Devil's Masterpiece (1927) – director
- The Lovelorn (1927) – director
- Diamond Handcuffs (1928) – director
- The Eternal Woman (1929) – director
- Headin' North (1930) as J. P. McCarthy – writer, director
- The Land of Missing Men (1930) as J. P. McCarthy – writer, director
- Oklahoma Cyclone (1930) as J. P. McCarthy – writer, director
- Cavalier of the West (1931) – writer, director
- Mother and Son (1931) – director
- Sunrise Trail (1931) credited as J. P. McCarthy – director
- God's Country and the Man (1931) as J. P. McCarthy – writer, director
- Nevada Buckaroo (1931) – director
- Rider of the Plains (1931) as J. P. McCarthy – director
- Ships of Hate (1931) as J. P. McCarthy – director
- The Ridin' Fool (1931) as J. P. McCarthy – director
- Beyond the Rockies (1932) – writer
- The Forty-Niners (1932) – director
- The Western Code (1932) as J. P. McCarthy – director
- Lucky Larrigan (1932) – writer, director
- The Fighting Champ (1932) – director
- The Return of Casey Jones (1933) as J. P. McCarthy – writer, director
- The Gallant Fool (1933) – writer
- Crashin' Broadway (1933) – director
- Trailing North (1933) – director
- The Law of 45's (1935) – director
- Lawless Border (1935) as J. P. McCarthy – director
- Song of the Gringo (1936) as John McCarthy – writer, director
- The Lion Man (1936) as John McCarthy – director
- Conspiracy (1939) as John McCarthy – writer
- Marked Trails (1944) as J. P. McCarthy – writer, director
- Raiders of the Border (1944) – director
- The Cisco Kid Returns (1945) – director
- Under Arizona Skies (1946) – writer
