= Rider of the Plains =

1931 film

- Directed by: John P. McCarthy
- Written by: Wellyn Totman
- Produced by: Trem Carr; W. Ray Johnston
- Starring: Tom Tyler; Lilian Bond; Al Bridge
- Cinematography: Archie Stout
- Edited by: Charles J. Hunt
- Production company: Trem Carr Pictures
- Distributed by: Syndicate Pictures
- Release date: May 3, 1931
- Running time: 57 minutes
- Country: United States
- Language: English

Rider of the Plains is a 1931 American Western film directed by John P. McCarthy and starring Tom Tyler, Lilian Bond and Al Bridge.

== Plot ==
A reformed outlaw adopts an orphan, Silent Sandy. When some citizens of the town discover Saunders's background, they contrive a scheme to take Sandy away by implicating Saunders in a robbery. Sandy gives a false witness account to protect Saunders, and the real perpetrators are caught.

== Cast ==
- Tom Tyler as Blackie Saunders
- Lilian Bond as Betty Harper
- Al Bridge as Deputy Bill Gaines
- Ted Adams as Parson Jim Wallace
- Gordon De Main as Sheriff John Evans
- Andy Shuford as Silent Sandy
- Slim Whitaker as Deputy Castro
- Fern Emmett as Miss Whipple

== Bibliography ==
- Michael R. Pitts. Poverty Row Studios, 1929–1940: An Illustrated History of 55 Independent Film Companies, with a Filmography for Each. McFarland & Company, 2005.
