= Ships of Hate =

1931 film

- Directed by: John P. McCarthy
- Written by: Wellyn Totman
- Produced by: Trem Carr
- Starring: Lloyd Hughes; Dorothy Sebastian; Charles Middleton
- Cinematography: Archie Stout
- Edited by: John S. Harrington
- Production company: Trem Carr Pictures
- Distributed by: Monogram Pictures
- Release date: June 15, 1931
- Running time: 65 minutes
- Country: United States
- Language: English

Ships of Hate is a 1931 American pre-Code drama film directed by John P. McCarthy and starring Lloyd Hughes, Dorothy Sebastian and Charles Middleton.

== Plot ==
A fierce rivalry is raged over a dancer by a captain of a ship and one of the men who has been shanghaied to serve aboard it.

== Cast ==
- Lloyd Hughes as Bart Wallace
- Dorothy Sebastian as Grace Walsh
- Charles Middleton as Captain Lash
- Lloyd Whitlock as Norman Walsh
- Ted Adams as The Professor
- Constantine Romanoff as Hans
- Gordon De Main as Ship's First Mate
- Jean Mason as Peg

== Bibliography ==
- Dooley, Roger. From Scarface to Scarlett: American Films in the 1930s. Harcourt Brace Jovanovich, 1984.
- Okuda, Ted. The Monogram Checklist: The Films of Monogram Pictures Corporation, 1931-1952. McFarland, 1987.
