= The Law of the 45's =

1935 film

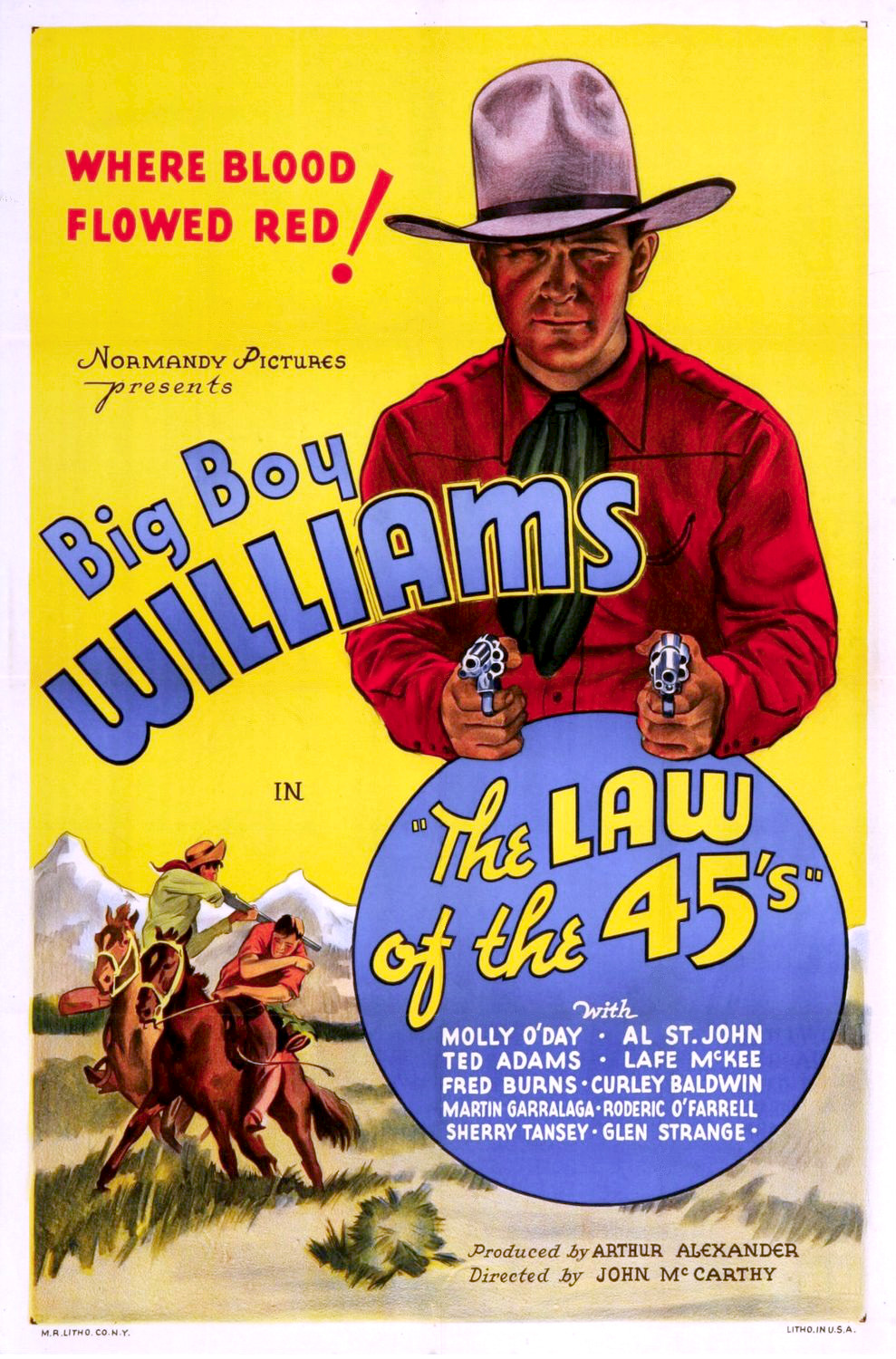
- Film poster
- Directed by: John P. McCarthy
- Written by: William Colt MacDonald (novel); Robert Emmett Tansey (screenplay)
- Produced by: Arthur Alexander (producer); Max Alexander (associate producer)
- Cinematography: Robert E. Cline
- Edited by: Holbrook N. Todd
- Production company: Normandy Pictures
- Distributed by: First Division Pictures
- Release date: December 1, 1935
- Running time: 57 minutes
- Country: United States
- Language: English

The Law of the 45's (also known as The Mysterious Mr. Sheffield in the UK) is a 1935 American Western film directed by John P. McCarthy. The screenplay was based on the 1933 novel of the same name by William Colt MacDonald. It was the first film to be made of MacDonald's characters The Three Mesquiteers, that later became a film series at Republic Pictures. Though only two of the characters, Tucson and Stoney, appeared in this film, Williams would appear as the missing member "Lullaby" Joslyn in Powdersmoke Range shot in the same year for RKO.

Previously the Alexander brothers Arthur Alexander and Max Alexander had released a series of Westerns starring Guinn Williams under their Beacon Pictures company. Law of the 45s was made by Max's Normandy Pictures.

== Plot ==
Tucson Smith and Stoney Martin are driving a herd of cattle to sell when they come into saving Charlie Hayden from a gang of killers. Tucson and Stoney sell their cattle to Hayden and agree to work for him, both as range hands and to stop the gang of killers hired from Mexico. Tucson explains that there are two laws: the regular law; and, when the regular law is nowhere to be found, the law of 45's.

== Cast ==
- Guinn 'Big Boy' Williams as Tucson "Two-Gun" Smith
- Molly O'Day as Joan Hayden
- Al St. John as Stoney Martin
- Ted Adams as Gordon Rontell
- Lafe McKee as Charlie Hayden (Joan's Father)
- Fred Burns as Sheriff Tom
- Curley Baldwin as Deputy Bill
- Martin Garralaga as Joe Sanchez (Rontell's Gunman)
- Broderick O'Farrell as Sir Henry Sheffield
- James Sheridan as Henchman Toral
- Glenn Strange as Monte (Hayden Wrangler)
