= Cavalier of the West =

1931 film

- Theatrical poster
- Directed by: John P. McCarthy
- Written by: John P. McCarthy
- Produced by: George M. Merrick (associate)
- Cinematography: Harry Neumann; Frank Keeson
- Edited by: James Morley
- Distributed by: State Rights; Weiss Bros. Artclass Pictures Corp.
- Release date: November 15, 1931
- Running time: 65 minutes
- Country: United States
- Language: English

Cavalier of the West is a 1931 American Western film written and directed by John P. McCarthy. Distributed by State Rights, Weiss Bros. and Artclass Pictures Corp., the film was released in the US on November 15, 1931, and marked the acting debut of five-year old Elena Verdugo, in an uncredited appearance.

== Plot ==
Captain John Allister of the United States Cavalry discovers Deputy Sheriff "Red" Greeley and four companions in the act of attacking a group of Indians. Through a ruse, John proves that their accusation that the Indians were rustling horses was merely an excuse to steal the gold that the Indians were transporting to El Rio.

== Cast ==
- Harry Carey as Captain John Allister
- Carmen Laroux as Dolores Fernandez
- Kane Richmond as Lieutenant Wilbur Allister
- Christine Montt as Chiquita
- Geo. F. Hayes as Sheriff Bill Ryan
- Ted Adams as Lee Burgess
- Maston Williams as Deputy "Red" Greeley
- Paul Panzer as Don Fernandez
- P. Narcha as White Feather
- Ben Corbett as Sergeant Regan
