= Mother and Son (1931 film) =

1931 film

- Directed by: John P. McCarthy; Paul Malvern
- Written by: Wellyn Totman
- Produced by: Trem Carr
- Starring: Clara Kimball Young
- Cinematography: Archie Stout
- Edited by: Len Wheeler
- Production company: Trem Carr Pictures
- Distributed by: Monogram Pictures
- Release date: August 1, 1931
- Running time: 60 minutes
- Country: USA
- Language: English

Mother and Son is a 1931 talking pre-Code film directed by John P. McCarthy and starring screen veteran Clara Kimball Young. It was distributed by Monogram Pictures.

== Cast ==
- Clara Kimball Young - Faro Lil Payton
- Bruce Warren - Jeff Payton
- John Elliot - Mr. Winfield
- Mildred Golden - Maureen Winfield
- Gordon De Main - Joe Connors (*as G. D. Wood
- Ernest Hilliard - Jameson
- Si Jenks - Faro Dealer (*as Steamboat Simon Curran)
- Thomas A. Curran - A Broker
- Cheyenne Mussellman - A Barber
