= Up for Murder =

1931 film

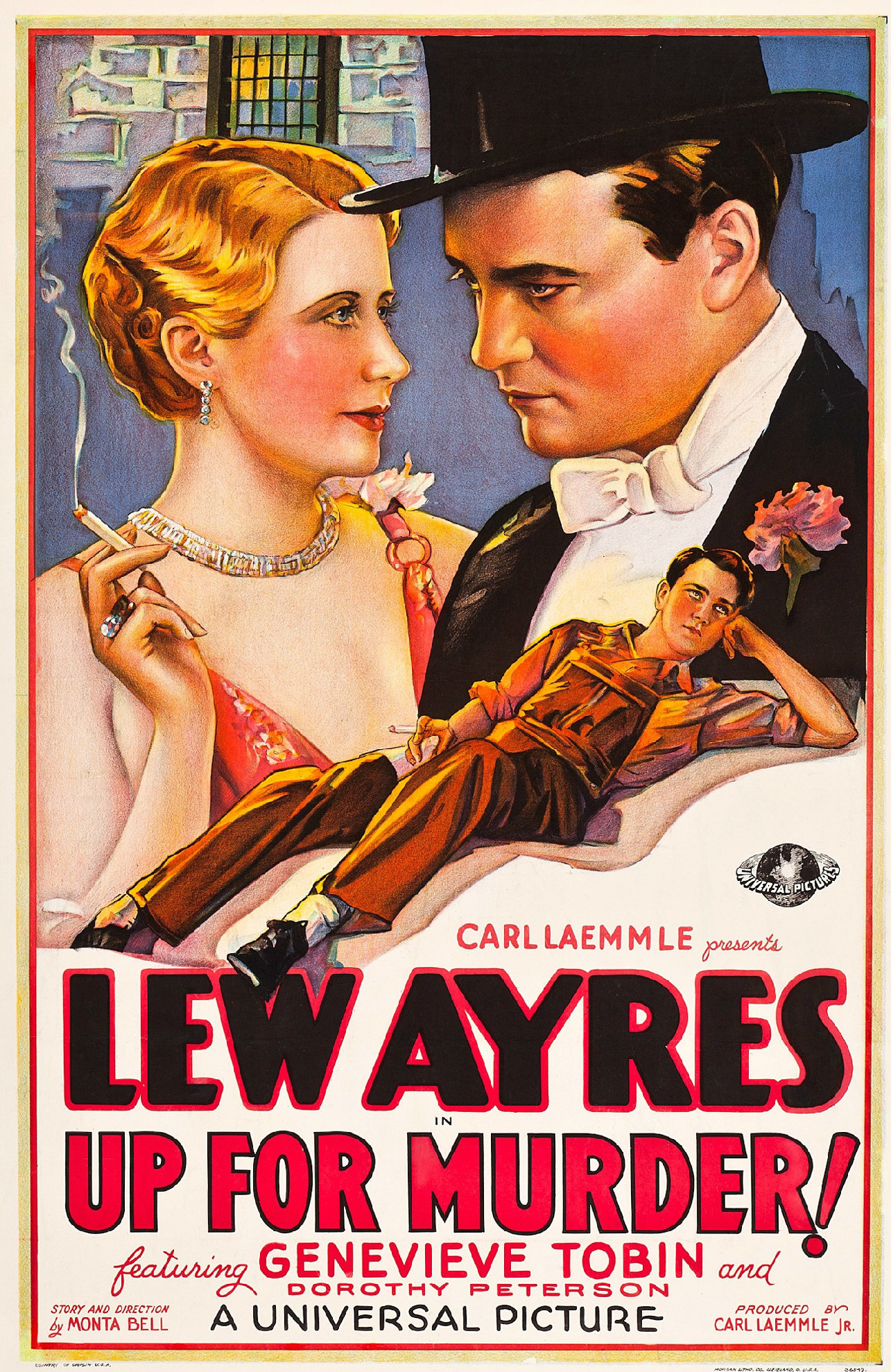
- Theatrical release poster
- Directed by: Monta Bell
- Screenplay by: Monta Bell
- Produced by: Monta Bell; Carl Laemmle, Jr.
- Starring: Lew Ayres; Genevieve Tobin; Purnell Pratt; Richard Tucker; Frank McHugh; Frederick Burt
- Cinematography: Karl Freund
- Edited by: Ted J. Kent
- Music by: Jack Foley; Heinz Roemheld
- Production company: Universal Pictures
- Distributed by: Universal Pictures
- Release date: May 27, 1931
- Running time: 68 minutes
- Country: United States
- Language: English

Up for Murder is a 1931 American pre-Code drama film written and directed by Monta Bell and starring Lew Ayres, Genevieve Tobin, Purnell Pratt, Richard Tucker, Frank McHugh and Frederick Burt. It was released on May 27, 1931, by Universal Pictures.

== Plot ==
Bob Marshall gets a promotion at a newspaper thanks to his reporter pal Collins, who owed him a favor. Marshall is assigned to be society columnist Myra Deane's escort to a ball. He falls for Myra and buys her a bracelet from his meager savings.

Arriving uninvited at her luxurious apartment, Bob is shocked to discover Myra is romantically involved with William Winter, a married man who is also their boss. Bob slugs him during a quarrel. Winter's skull hits a table and he dies, but Myra lies, insisting Winter is merely unconscious, hoping to avoid a scandal. She moves the body once Bob leaves.

Bob reads about Winter's death in the paper and turns himself in to the law as the culprit. He is convicted of murder and sentenced to be executed before Myra comes forward with the truth. Bob later receives a package with the bracelet inside, along with Myra's invitation to return it to her in person.

== Cast ==
- Lew Ayres as Robert Marshall
- Genevieve Tobin as Myra Deane
- Purnell Pratt as William Winter
- Richard Tucker as Cyril Herk
- Frank McHugh as Collins
- Frederick Burt as City Editor
- Dorothy Peterson as Mrs. Marshall
