= God's Country and the Man (1931 film) =

1931 film directed by John P. McCarthy

- Directed by: John P. McCarthy
- Written by: John P. McCarthy; Wellyn Totman; Alan Bridge
- Produced by: Trem Carr
- Cinematography: Archie Stout
- Edited by: Charles Hunt
- Production company: Trem Carr Productions
- Distributed by: State Rights; Syndicate Pictures
- Release date: May 1, 1931
- Running time: 61 or 67 minutes
- Country: United States
- Language: English

God's Country and the Man is a 1931 American Western pre-Code film directed by John P. McCarthy and written by McCarthy, Wellyn Totman and Alan Bridge. Distributed by State Rights and Syndicate Pictures, the film was released in the US on May 1, 1931.

== Cast ==
- Tom Tyler as Tex
- Betty Mack as Rose
- Alan Bridge as Livermore
- Ted Adams as Romero
- George Hayes as Stingeree Kelly
- Julian Rivero as General Pedro Gomez
