= Wellyn Totman =

American screenwriter

Edward Llewellyn Totman, known professionally as Wellyn Totman (August 3, 1903 - October 6, 1977) was a film and television screenwriter in Hollywood. His work includes original stories and adaptations, such as the Mascot Pictures movie serial The Miracle Rider starring Tom Mix. He also wrote several Republic Pictures films. He was born and raised in Duluth, Minnesota.

He was named after his father and grandfather. He attended Washburn Elementary School and Duluth Central High School. His writing career began in high school where he wrote a play, wrote reviews for the newspaper, and did event booking and promotion.

Totman was arrested for drunk driving and belligerence in 1937 and his writing productivity declined in the 1940s.

== Work ==
Totman's work includes:

- Stories for episodes of The Miracle Rider (1935) including Episode 1 The Vanishing Indian, Episode 2 The Firebird Strikes, Episode 3 The Flying Knife, Episode 4 A Race with Death, Episode 5 Double-Barrelled, Episode 8 Guerrilla Warfare, Episode 9 The Silver Band, Episode 6 Thundering Hoofs, Episode 15 Justice Rides the Plains, Episode 7 The Dragnet, Episode 14 Between Two Fires, Episode 13 The Secret of X-94, Episode 12 Danger Rides with Death, and Episode 11 A Traitor Dies
- Fighting Thoroughbreds (1939) screenplay
- The Girl from Mandalay (1936) screenplay
- Streamline Express (1936) original story
- Happy Go Lucky (1936) original story
- One Frightened Night (1935) screenplay
- Confidential (1935) screenplay
- Carnival Lady (1933)
- The Man from Arizona (1932)
- Hidden Valley (1932) script
- Galloping Thru (1931)
- Ghost City (1932)
- Young Blood (1932)
- Forgotten Women (1931)
- Rider of the Plains (1931)
- Ships of Hate (1931)
- Mother and Son (1931) story and adaptation
- The Eternal Woman (1929) script and original story
- The Albany Night Boat (1928) original story
- Domestic Meddlers (1928) original story
