= Singapore (1947 film) =

1947 film by John Brahm

- Theatrical release poster
- Directed by: John Brahm
- Screenplay by: Seton I. Miller; Robert Thoeren
- Story by: Seton I. Miller
- Produced by: Jerry Bresler
- Starring: Fred MacMurray; Ava Gardner; Roland Culver
- Cinematography: Maury Gertsman
- Edited by: William Hornbeck
- Music by: Daniele Amfitheatrof
- Color process: Black and white
- Production company: Universal International Pictures
- Distributed by: Universal Pictures
- Release date: August 13, 1947
- Running time: 79 minutes
- Country: United States
- Language: English

Singapore is a 1947 American film noir crime romance film starring Fred MacMurray, Ava Gardner, and Roland Culver. Directed by John Brahm, the film was remade as Istanbul (1957) with the location moved to Turkey, and Errol Flynn and Cornell Borchers in the starring roles.

== Plot ==
Pearl smuggler Matt Gordon finds romance with Linda Grahame just before the start of World War II. He proposes to her, and she accepts. However, when the Japanese attack Singapore, the church where she is waiting to marry him is bombed; Gordon searches frantically in the wreckage, but cannot find her. He is forced to sail away on his schooner.

With the end of the war, Gordon returns after five years, and is met by Deputy Commissioner Hewitt, who is convinced he has returned for a hidden cache of pearls. So are Gordon's old criminal associates, Mr. Mauribus and his underling Sascha Barda. Mauribus offers to buy the pearls, but Gordon denies he has any.

Then, to his shock, Gordon sees Linda, but she does not remember him or anything prior to waking up in a hospital during the war. Now known as Ann, she spent years in a prison camp together with plantation owner Michael Van Leyden, then married him. Gordon tries to help her remember her past, but to no avail. She does, however, go to see Linda's pre-war servant, Ming Ling. Ming Ling recognizes her, but Linda's memories are still blocked.

Giving up, Gordon retrieves the pearls from his old hotel room, and hides them in the luggage of the current occupants, American tourists Mr. and Mrs. Bellows. Hewitt questions and searches him after seeing him exit the room, but discovers nothing. However, he informs Gordon that Ann Van Leyden is missing.

Gordon goes to Mauribus. He deceives Mauribus and Sascha into believing that Linda double-crossed him and has the pearls. They take him, at gunpoint, to her. He pulls out a gun taped to his ankle, and dispatches the two crooks. In the excitement, Ann is knocked unconscious. Gordon takes her back to her husband.

The blow restores Ann's memories. She is willing to resume her life with Michael, but he confesses he knew all about her past. With her happiness in mind, he drives her to the airport. When they arrive, not only is Gordon's luggage thoroughly searched, but so are the bags of the Bellows. Giving up, he tells Hewitt where the pearls are. Hewitt lets him board the aircraft, which takes off just before Linda arrives. Spotting her, Hewitt has the aircraft return, and Ann runs out onto the tarmac to meet it.

== Cast ==
- Fred MacMurray as Matt Gordon
- Ava Gardner as Linda
- Roland Culver as Michael Van Leyden
- Richard Haydn as Deputy Hewitt
- Spring Byington as Mrs. Bellows
- Thomas Gomez as Mr. Mauribus
- Porter Hall as Mr. Bellows
- George Lloyd as Sascha Barda
- Maylia as Ming Ling
- Holmes Herbert as Rev. Barnes
- Edith Evanson as Mrs. Barnes
- Frederick Worlock as Cadum
- Lal Chand Mehra as Mr. Hussein
- Curt Conway as Pepe (as Kurt Conway)
- Dimples Cooper (Elizabeth Cooper) as Native woman (uncredited)

== Production ==
Principal photography on Singapore took place from February 26 to late April 1947, primarily in and around Palmdale, California.

== Reception ==
=== Critical response ===
The New York Times film critic Bosley Crowther was merciless in his review, "Ava Gardner is sultry and empty-headed as the script demands. Mr. MacMurray doesn't ever appear to have his heart in what he is doing, and Spring Byington and Porter Hall as the tourists from the Midwest conduct themselves in the time-honored fashion that is supposed to denote slightly-addled American transients. 'Singapore' is a pretty poor excuse for an entertainment, even as minor league jewel-smuggling fare."

Film historian Leonard Maltin, however, considered the film, "... (an) alluring drama [with characters] loosely modeled after those in Casablanca".

Film critic Dennis Schwartz was also more positive in his later review. He wrote, "John Brahm (The Lodger/Hangover Square/The Locket) directs with flair an exotic thriller inspired by Casablanca. It was remade in 1957 as Istanbul with Errol Flynn ... There's a Casablanca-like ending at the airport, with the chief inspector showing he has a heart and that true love between the adventurers can't be denied no matter what. The thriller had fine production values, terrific atmosphere, and Ava and MacMurray were in great form."
