= The Cowboy Kid =

1928 film

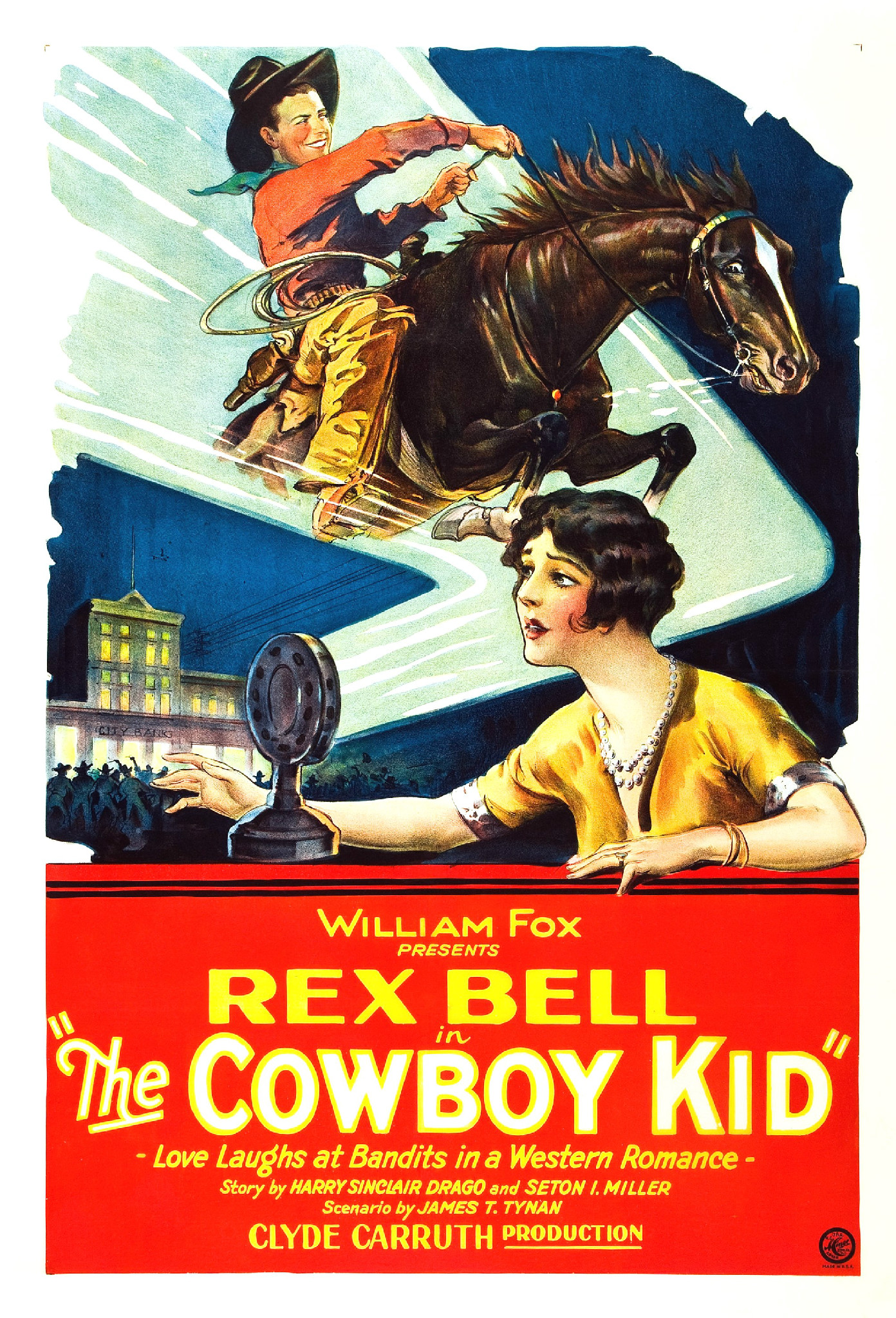
- Theatrical release poster
- Directed by: Clyde Carruth
- Screenplay by: James J. Tynan
- Story by: Harry Sinclair Drago; Seton I. Miller
- Starring: Rex Bell; Mary Jane Temple; Brooks Benedict; Alice Belcher; Joseph De Grasse; Syd Crossley
- Cinematography: Sol Halprin
- Edited by: Milton Carruth
- Production company: Fox Film Corporation
- Distributed by: Fox Film Corporation
- Release date: July 15, 1928
- Running time: 50 minutes
- Country: United States
- Languages: Silent; English intertitles

The Cowboy Kid is a 1928 American silent Western film directed by Clyde Carruth and written by James J. Tynan. The film stars Rex Bell, Mary Jane Temple, Brooks Benedict, Alice Belcher, Joseph De Grasse and Syd Crossley. The film was released on July 15, 1928, by Fox Film Corporation.

== Cast ==
- Rex Bell as Jim Barrett
- Mary Jane Temple as Janet Grover
- Brooks Benedict as Trig Morgan
- Alice Belcher as Lilly Langton
- Joseph De Grasse as John Grover
- Syd Crossley as Sheriff
- Billy Bletcher as Deputy Sheriff

== Preservation ==
With no holdings located in archives, The Cowboy Kid is considered a lost film.
