= Seton I. Miller =

American screenwriter (1902–1974)

- Born: Seton Ingersoll Miller; May 3, 1902; Chehalis, Washington, U.S.
- Died: March 29, 1974 (aged 71); Woodland Hills, Los Angeles, U.S.
- Other names: Hap (nickname)
- Education: Yale University
- Occupations: Screenwriter & Producer
- Spouse(s): Bonita J. Miller (div. 1940) Ann Evers (m. 1946)
- Children: 3

Seton Ingersoll Miller (May 3, 1902 – March 29, 1974) was an American screenwriter and producer. During his career, he worked with film directors such as Howard Hawks and Michael Curtiz. Miller received two Oscar nominations and won once for Best Screenplay for the 1941 fantasy romantic comedy film, Here Comes Mr. Jordan, along with Sidney Buchman.

== Early life ==
Seton Miller was born and raised in Chehalis, Washington. His father, Harry John, was a successful lumberman and a state legislator, and his mother was a prominent member of the local community. He attended Yale University and was part of the college orchestra and crew. A few of his movies were screened locally in his hometown, including 1932's Scarface at the Peacock Theater and his 1933 movie, The Eagle and the Hawk, was honored with a first-run showing at the St. Helens Theater in downtown Chehalis.

== Career ==
=== Early writing and Fox Films ===
A Yale graduate, Miller began writing stories for silent films in the late 1920s. He worked on Brown of Harvard in technical direction and as a member of the cast. He signed a three-year contract at Fox Film Corporation in 1927 where his credits included the films, Paid to Love, Two Girls Wanted, High School Hero, and Wolf Fangs. He also started early work with Howard Hawks on the productions, Fazil and Cradle Snatchers.

=== A Girl in Every Port and Howard Hawks ===
Miller's first big hit was the 1928 film, A Girl in Every Port, directed by Howard Hawks, a crucial film in Hawks' career. He was reunited with Hawks later that year for Fazil then did two Rex Bell 1928 Westerns, The Cowboy Kid and Girl-Shy Cowboy. In 1929, Miller wrote Hawks' first sound film, The Air Circus then did The Far Call for Allan Dwan that same year, following it up in 1930 with The Lone Star Ranger and a comedy, Harmony at Home, then left Fox.

Miller joined Hawks at First National and in 1930 did The Dawn Patrol, working with another team on Today that same year. In 1931 he started work on three movies with Hawks, The Criminal Code at Columbia, and in 1932, both Scarface, and The Crowd Roars. His final works at Fox Films include The Last Mile then adapted the comedy play Once in a Lifetime, both completed in 1932.

=== Paramount ===
At Paramount, Miller wrote Hot Saturday (1932) and in 1933, the horror film, Murders in the Zoo, the Hawks movie The Eagle and the Hawk, and Gambling Ship (1933). During the year he went to Columbia for Master of Men. In 1934, he worked on Come On Marines! for Henry Hathaway, then went back to Fox for Murder in Trinidad, Marie Galante and Charlie Chan's Courage.

He worked on The Farrell Case for James Cagney and Jack Holt but it was not made.

=== Warner Bros ===
For Warner Bros., Miller wrote The St. Louis Kid (1934) for James Cagney. In 1935, after working on Murder on a Honeymoon for RKO, Warner Bros. asked him to return to work on further Cagney films: G Men, and Frisco Kid. He wrote a sequel to G Men, G Women that was not made.

Miller continued to write for other studios and in 1936, wrote It Happened in New York for Universal and in 1937, Two in the Dark for RKO and for Republic, The Leathernecks Have Landed.

Miller went back to Warner Bros. in 1937 to do Bullets or Ballots for Edward G. Robinson and Humphrey Bogart. He stayed at the studio to work on Marked Woman, San Quentin, Back in Circulation, and Kid Galahad. He wrote Kit Carson for Wayne Morris but it as not made.

In 1938, Miller worked on the Errol Flynn vehicle, The Adventures of Robin Hood, which was a big success. He was put on another Flynn film, a remake of The Dawn Patrol. Miller wrote Valley of the Giants that year and following in 1939, two productions with John Garfield, Dust Be My Destiny and Castle on the Hudson.

He officially left Warners in July 1939 after four years. but did another Flynn swashbuckler, The Sea Hawk in 1940. He also wrote a Western for Flynn, Tombstone but it was not made.

=== Post-Warners ===
At Universal he adapted I James Lewis but it does not appear to have been made. At Columbia he cowrote Here Comes Mr. Jordan (1941), which won him an Oscar, following it up with a Universal production, This Woman is Mine (1942). Warners' Secret Enemies (1942) was based on his story.

=== 20th Century Fox ===
Miller went to Fox, where in 1942 he worked on My Gal Sal and The Black Swan. Working briefly for Columbia, he adapted the play Heart of City for Merle Oberon but it was not made.

=== Paramount: Turning Producer ===
In 1942, Miller signed a contract with Paramount to write and produce. He started with Ministry of Fear (1944), directed by Fritz Lang. He was assigned The Griswold Story but it was not made. Miller also produced The Bride Wore Boots (1946).

He had written a script of Two Years Before the Mast for Edward Small in 1939. The project was bought by Paramount, and Miller also produced. It was directed by John Farrow and he and Miller made two more films together, California (1947), and Calcutta (filmed 1945, released 1947). In May 1946 it was reported he had asked for and received a release from his Paramount contract.

=== Warners & Universal ===
Miller sold his script for Singapore to Universal in 1947. It was later remade as Istanbul (1957). In August 1947, he signed with Warner Bros to write and produce. He was to start with Colt 45 starring Wayne Morris. It was not made. Instead he wrote and produced Fighter Squadron (1948).

=== 1950s independent writer and studio works ===
In the 1950s, Miller wrote either independently or for various studios. In 1950, Miller wrote The Man Who Cheated Himself, originally known as The Gun, and associate produced The Sound of Fury. Early in that year he formed a company with Irvin Rubin.

He wrote and produced Queen for a Day (1951) at United Artists and wrote an adaptation of Island in the Sky but is not credited on the final film. Miller wrote The Mississippi Gambler (1953) and in 1954, the Bengal Brigade for Universal and The Shanghai Story for Republic.

In 1955, he sold a Western script, The Staked Plains to Henry Fonda. He wrote scripts for a Dennis O'Keefe TV series Hart of Honolulu. He wrote The Willie Gordon Story for Ray Milland in 1957, meant to be shot in England but it was not made. That same year, he sold a story Pete's Dragon for the Disney company to make as a vehicle for Kevin Corcoran. The eventual film was not made for another two decades.

Miller was credited on the remake of The Last Mile (1959). He closed out the decade by writing Death Valley Days and creating a series, Rogue for Hire.

=== Later career ===
His later credits span into the 1970s, including Knife for the Ladies (1974) and an unpublished story of his was filmed as Pete's Dragon (1977).

== Awards and nominations ==
Miller was nominated with Fred Niblo Jr. for their 1931 screen adaptation of Martin Flavin's play The Criminal Code. He and Sidney Buchman won the Academy Award for Best Writing, Screenplay in 1941 for Here Comes Mr. Jordan.

== Personal life ==
Miller married Bonita and had two children, Keith and Bonita, but he and his wife divorced in 1940. She demanded $2,000 a month in alimony claiming Miller abused her verbally and physically. He remarried in 1946, to actress Ann Evers and had another child, a daughter, Catherine, who became an actor.

== Partial filmography ==
As writer, unless otherwise specified.

- Paid to Love (1927)
- Two Girls Wanted (1927)
- The High School Hero (1927)
- Wolf Fangs (1927)
- A Girl in Every Port (1928)
- Fazil (1928)
- The Cowboy Kid (1928)
- Girl-Shy Cowboy (1928)
- The Air Circus (1928)
- The Far Call (1929)
- The Lone Star Ranger (1930)
- Harmony at Home (1930)
- The Dawn Patrol (1930)
- Today (1930)
- The Criminal Code (1931)
- Scarface (1932)
- The Crowd Roars (1932)
- The Last Mile (1932)
- Once in a Lifetime (1932)
- Hot Saturday (1932)
- Murders in the Zoo (1933)
- Criminel (1933)
- The Eagle and the Hawk (1933)
- Gambling Ship (1933)
- Master of Men (1933)
- Come On, Marines! (1934)
- Murder in Trinidad (1934)
- Marie Galante (1934) (uncredited)
- A Perfect Weekend (1934)
- Charlie Chan's Courage (1934)
- The St. Louis Kid (1934)
- Murder on a Honeymoon (1935)
- G Men (1935)
- Frisco Kid (1935)
- It Happened in New York (1935)
- Two in the Dark (1936)
- The Marines Have Landed (1936)
- Bullets or Ballots (1936)
- Marked Woman (1937) (uncredited)
- San Quentin (1937) (uncredited)
- Back in Circulation (1937) (uncredited)
- The Great O'Malley (1937) (uncredited)
- Kid Galahad (1937)
- Penitentiary (1938)
- The Adventures of Robin Hood (1938)
- The Dawn Patrol (1938)
- Valley of the Giants (1938)
- Dust Be My Destiny (1939) (uncredited)
- Years Without Days a.k.a. Castle on the Hudson (1940)
- The Sea Hawk (1940)
- Here Comes Mr. Jordan (1941)
- This Woman Is Mine (1941)
- Secret Enemies (1942) (based on his story "Mr Farrell")
- My Gal Sal (1942)
- The Black Swan (1942)
- Trial by Trigger (1944) (short, uncredited)
- Ministry of Fear (1944) – also associate producer
- Two Years Before the Mast (1946) – also associate producer
- The Bride Wore Boots (1946) (producer only)
- California (1947) (uncredited, also produced)
- Calcutta (1947) (also produced)
- Singapore (1947)
- Fighter Squadron (1948) (also produced)
- Convicted (1950)
- The Man Who Cheated Himself (1950)
- Try and Get Me! (1950) – associate producer only
- Queen for a Day (1951) – also associate producer
- The Mississippi Gambler (1953)
- Bengal Brigade (1954)
- The Shanghai Story (1954)
- Istanbul (1957)
- The Last Mile (1959), a remake of the 1932 film
- Rogue for Hire (1960) (TV series) – creator, writer of pilot, producer
- Death Valley Days (1963) – episode "Diamond Jim Brady"
- Knife for the Ladies (1974)
- Pete's Dragon (1977) (story)
