= The Deadly Dreams =

1951 film

- Directed by: Paul Martin
- Written by: Gustav Kampendonk
- Produced by: Werner Fischer; Georg Mohr
- Starring: Rudolf Forster; Will Quadflieg; Cornell Borchers
- Cinematography: Fritz Arno Wagner
- Edited by: Rosemarie Weinert
- Music by: Hans-Otto Borgmann
- Production company: Pontus Film
- Distributed by: National Film
- Release date: 10 January 1951
- Running time: 81 minutes
- Country: West Germany
- Language: German

The Deadly Dreams (German: Die tödlichen Träume) is a 1951 West German fantasy drama film directed by Paul Martin and starring Rudolf Forster, Will Quadflieg and Cornell Borchers. The film is based on several stories by the romantic era writer E. T. A. Hoffmann. It was shot at the Wiesbaden Studios and on location around Bamberg in Bavaria. It was entered into the 1951 Cannes Film Festival.

== Cast ==
- Rudolf Forster as Opitz / E.T.A. Hoffmann / Gefreiter
- Will Quadflieg as Winter / Barravas / Florestan
- Cornell Borchers as Angelika / Inez / Lisette / Maria
- Walter Franck as Alexis / Don d'Alvarez / Cardillac
- Harald Paulsen as Magier / Rodriguez / Olivier

== Bibliography ==
- Karl, Lars & Skopal, Pavel. Cinema in Service of the State: Perspectives on Film Culture in the GDR and Czechoslovakia, 1945–1960. Berghahn Books, 2015.
