= Olive Stokes Mix =

American actress

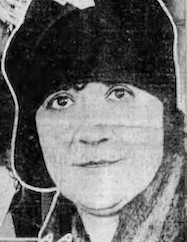
- Olive Stokes Mix, from a 1928 newspaper
- Born: Olive Stokes; April 10, 1887; Indian Territory (present day Dewey, Oklahoma), United States
- Died: November 1, 1972 (aged 85); Los Angeles, California, US
- Spouse: Tom Mix (m. 1909; div. 1917)
- Children: Ruth Mix

Olive Stokes Mix (April 10, 1887 – November 1, 1972) was an American actress.

== Early life ==
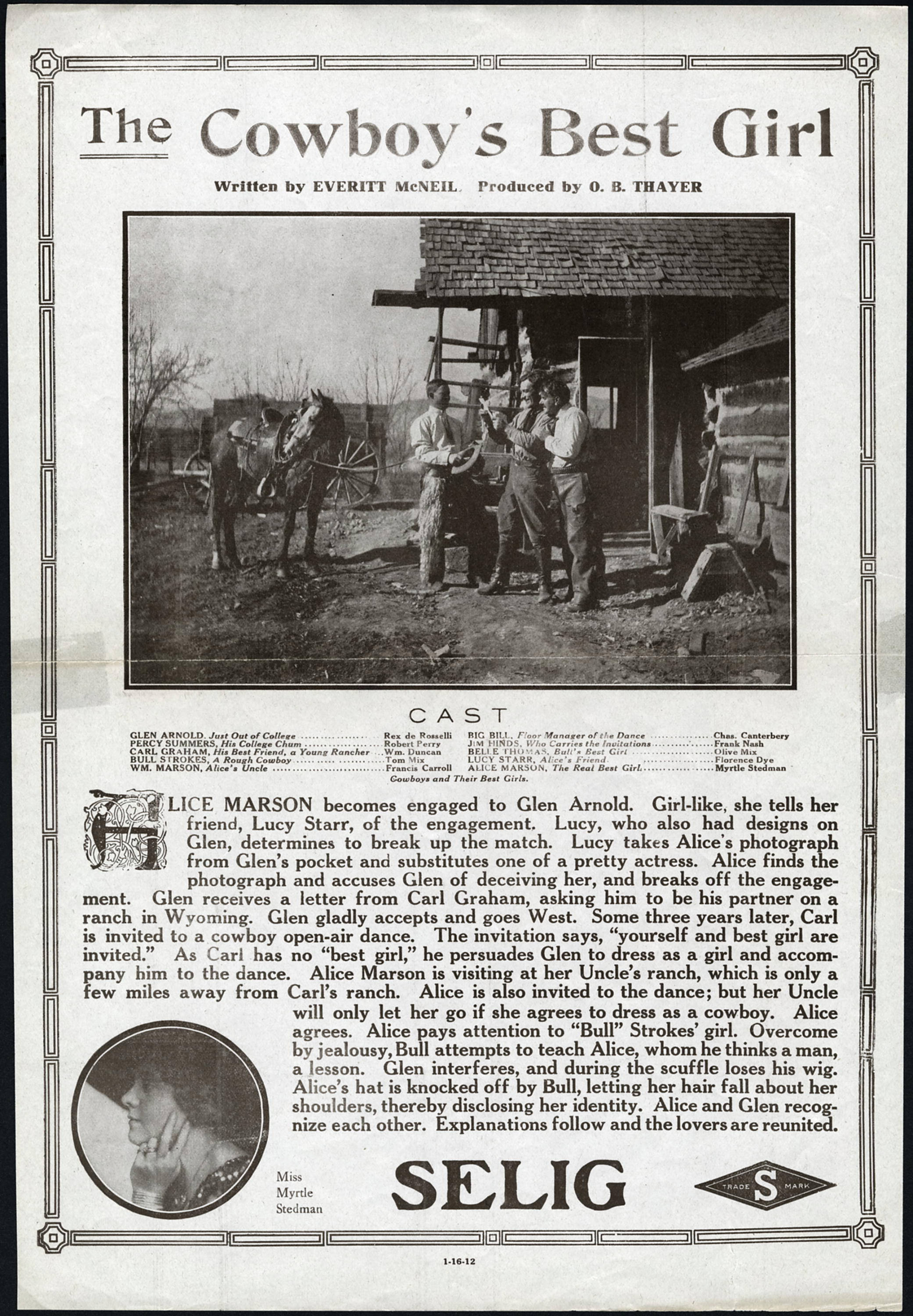
Release flier for The Cowboy's Best Girl (1912), with Olive Mix in the cast

Olive M. Stokes was born in Indian Territory, the daughter of James Henry Stokes (1861–1904) and Georgia Ann Russell (1868–1939), later known as Georgia Brown. Her parents ran a ranch near Dewey, Oklahoma. Her mother was a Cherokee Nation citizen, Olive Stokes was enrolled on the Dawes Rolls as 1/8th "Cherokee by blood", and her father is listed as an "intermarried white" whose enrollment was refused because his marriage took place prior to November 1, 1875. She graduated from Ward-Belmont College in 1907.

== Career ==
As a young woman, Olive Stokes helped run her family's ranch and her mother's boarding house for oil workers. Mix's screen credits were mostly in Western short films, and included roles in Dad's Girls (1911), Told in Colorado (1911), Why the Sheriff Is a Bachelor (1911), A Cowboy's Best Girl (1912), The Scapegoat (1912), The Diamond S Ranch (1912), Saved from the Vigilantes (1913), and The Single Code (1917).

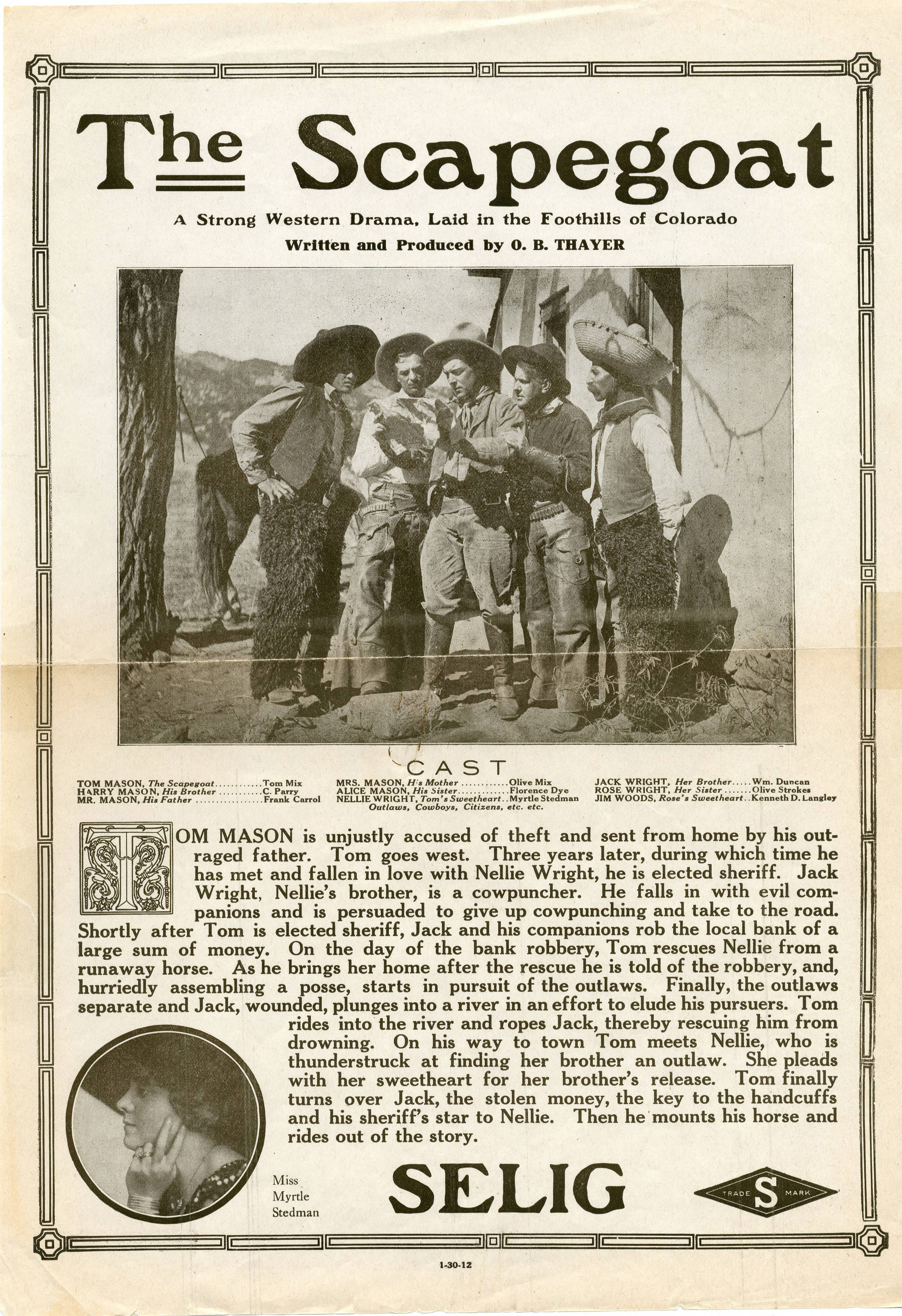
Release flier for The Scapegoat (1922), with Olive Mix in the cast

In her later years, Mix wrote The Fabulous Tom Mix (1957), a biography of her late ex-husband. and invested in oil wells and mines, including a uranium mine in Utah. In 1962 she was interviewed in the CBC Radio program The Unreal West.

== Personal life ==
Olive Stokes married western film star Tom Mix in 1909; she was his third wife (or second, by his count). They divorced in 1917. They had a daughter, Ruth Mix (1912–1977), who also acted in Westerns. Olive Stokes Mix died in 1972, aged 85 years, in Los Angeles. Her grandson Hick Hill was an actor in 1960 Westerns.
