= Frisco Kid =

1935 film by Lloyd Bacon

- Directed by: Lloyd Bacon
- Written by: Warren Duff; Seton I. Miller
- Produced by: Samuel Bischoff
- Starring: James Cagney; Margaret Lindsay; Ricardo Cortez; Lili Damita
- Cinematography: Sol Polito
- Edited by: Owen Marks
- Music by: Bernhard Kaun
- Production company: Warner Bros. Pictures
- Distributed by: Warner Bros. Pictures
- Release date: November 30, 1935
- Running time: 80 min
- Language: English

Frisco Kid is a 1935 drama film starring James Cagney and directed by Lloyd Bacon. Set in San Francisco in the 1850s, it traces the rise and fall (and possible redemption) of a sailor who achieves wealth and success on San Francisco's Barbary Coast but is spurned by the woman he loves (Margaret Lindsay). The supporting cast also features Ricardo Cortez, Lili Damita, and Barton MacLane. Writing for Turner Classic Movies, Richard Harland Smith observes: "While hewing closely to the crime-shouldn't-pay maxims of the newly minted Production Code, the violence is often disarmingly brutal, with a double hanging late in the film being as disturbing as it is coyly elliptical."

== Plot ==
In San Francisco in the 1850s, a city where gold fever has left shipowners short-handed, Bat Morgan, a sailor come ashore, is robbed and nearly shanghaied aboard another ship. Managing to escape, he sticks around town to pay back those responsible and then to take a cut in the action in the vice district. He organized the various gambling houses (and other forms of vice implied but, for Code reasons, not explicitly shown) into a consolidated enterprise in alliance with a corrupt city boss, Jim Daley, and thereby comes into conflict with a crusading newspaper run by Jean Barrat, the daughter of the recently murdered publisher, and idealistic editor Charles Ford.

Loyal to his friends, even when they are on the other side, Bat Morgan protects the editor when Jim Daley orders him eliminated. He also falls in love with Jean, but his way of life and lack of faith in any morality beyond looking out for number one make a permanent relationship all but impossible. When his best friend, Solly Green, takes a bullet for him, Bat mourns him, but when Jean points to Solly as an example of people helping others, he observes that Solly would be alive today if he hadn't met Bat.

Riled at a judge's snub, he determines to bring his Barbary Coast crowd to the opening night at the Opera House, which the Judge has opened as an alternative place of amusement to the gambling dens. A gambler, Paul Morra, shoulders his way into the judge's box and murders him on a flimsy excuse. The resulting outrage provokes a public outcry, and when Morra is arrested and jailed, a lynch mob gathers, crying for his blood. Bat arranges Morra's release, not so much because he likes him as because he owes him a debt of gratitude for starting him on his upward rise.

Soon after, Ford is murdered by Jim Daley in a bar-room fight. Jean blames Bat, holding him responsible for all the evil done by those who work with him. A vigilance movement sets out to clean up the town, rounding up Morra and Daley and hanging them both. When the lowlife of the Barbary Coast determine to take revenge by wrecking the press and burning the city, Bat Morgan convinces them to do otherwise. Trying to keep them from fighting back as the vigilantes come to destroy the Coast, he is shot in the back by one of the underworld thugs and is captured by the vigilantes. Jean saves him from hanging and he is permitted to go free, on her parole.

== Cast ==
- James Cagney as Bat Morgan
- Margaret Lindsay as Jean Barrat
- Ricardo Cortez as Paul Morra
- Lili Damita as Belle Morra
- Donald Woods as Charles Ford
- Barton MacLane as Spider Burke
- George E. Stone as Solly Green
- Joe King as James Daley
- Addison Richards as Coleman
- Robert McWade as Judge Crawford
- Joseph Crehan as McClanahan
- Robert Strange as Graber
- Joe Sawyer as Slugs Crippen
- Fred Kohler as Shanghai Duck
- John Wray as The Weasel
- John Elliott as Doctor (uncredited)
- Charles Middleton as Speaker (uncredited)
