= Master of Men (film) =

1933 American drama film

- Directed by: Lambert Hillyer
- Written by: Chester Erskine; Eugene Solow; Seton I. Miller; Edward E. Paramore Jr.
- Starring: Jack Holt; Fay Wray; Walter Connolly
- Cinematography: Joseph H. August
- Edited by: Gene Havlick
- Production company: Columbia Pictures
- Distributed by: Columbia Pictures
- Release date: November 28, 1933
- Running time: 65 minutes
- Country: United States
- Language: English

Master of Men is a 1933 American pre-Code drama film directed by Lambert Hillyer and starring Jack Holt, Fay Wray and Walter Connolly. It was produced and distributed by Columbia Pictures.

== Plot ==
An aspirational steel mill worker fights his way up to become a Wall Street financier. His wife disapproves of his stock market schemes, and when he loses large amounts of money they go to live in the country.

== Cast ==
- Jack Holt as Buck Garrett
- Fay Wray as Kay Walling
- Walter Connolly as Sam Parker
- Berton Churchill as Mr. Walling
- Theodore von Eltz as Grenaker

== Bibliography ==
- Roy Kinnard & Tony Crnkovich. The Films of Fay Wray. McFarland, 2015.
