= It Happened in New York =

1935 film by Alan Crosland

- Directed by: Alan Crosland
- Written by: Ward Morehouse (play); Jean Dalrymple (play); Seton I. Miller; Rian James
- Produced by: Edmund Grainger
- Starring: Gertrude Michael; Heather Angel; Lyle Talbot
- Cinematography: George Robinson
- Edited by: Murray Seldeen
- Music by: Oliver Wallace
- Production company: Universal Pictures
- Distributed by: Universal Pictures
- Release date: March 18, 1935
- Running time: 75 minutes
- Country: United States
- Language: English

It Happened in New York is a 1935 American musical comedy film directed by Alan Crosland and starring Gertrude Michael, Heather Angel and Lyle Talbot. It is based on the play Bagdad on the Hudson by Ward Morehouse and Jean Dalrymple. The plot concerns a New York taxi driver hired as a bodyguard to a film star with a manager who pursues publicity stunts for her.

The film's sets were designed by the art director Charles D. Hall.

== Cast ==
- Gertrude Michael as Vania Nardi
- Heather Angel as Chris Edwards
- Lyle Talbot as Charley Barnes
- Hugh O'Connell as Greg Haywood
- Adrienne D'Ambricourt as Fleurette
- Rafael Storm as The Phony Prince
- Robert Gleckler as Venetti
- Wallis Clark as Joe Blake
- Phil Tead as Radio Announcer
- Bess Stafford as Landlady
- Dick Elliott as Publicity Man
- Huntley Gordon as Hotel manager
- Guy Usher as New York Policeman
- King Baggot as Policeman
- Phyllis Ludwig as Actress

== Bibliography ==
- Monaco, James. The Encyclopedia of Film. Perigee Books, 1991.
