= The Girl-Shy Cowboy =

1928 film

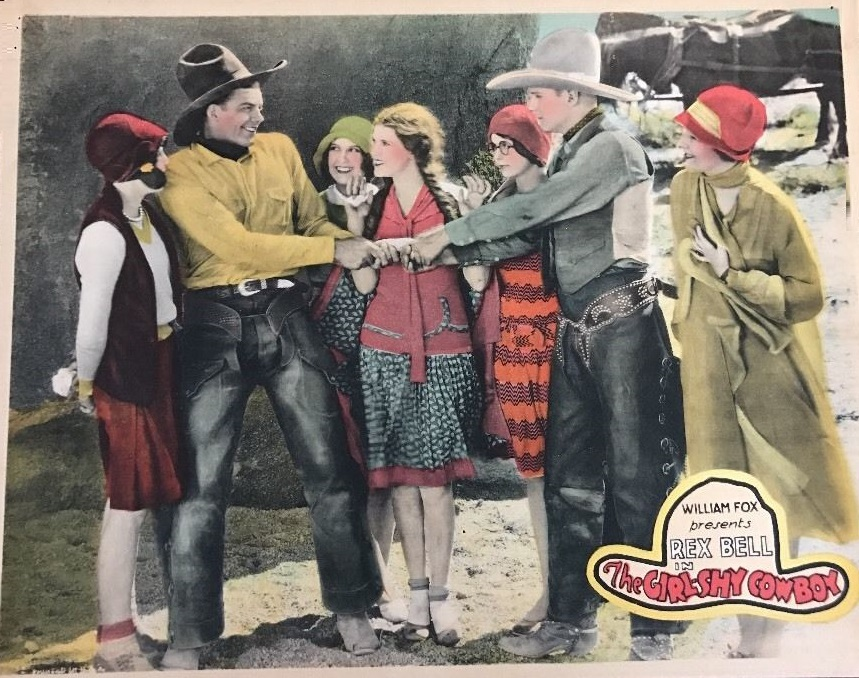
- Directed by: R.L. Hough
- Screenplay by: Seton I. Miller; James J. Tynan; Garrett Graham
- Cinematography: Sol Halperin
- Edited by: J. Logan Pearson
- Release date: August 12, 1928
- Running time: 5 reels
- Country: United States
- Language: Silent (English intertitles)

The Girl-Shy Cowboy is a 1928 American silent Western film starring Rex Bell and directed by R.L. Hough. It was based on a story by Seton I. Miller.

== Cast ==
- Rex Bell as Joe Benson
- George Meeker as Harry Lasser
- Patsy O'Leary as Alice Weldon
- Donald Stuart as Red Harden
