= Fighting Pioneers =

- Theatrical release poster
- Directed by: Harry L. Fraser
- Screenplay by: Harry L. Fraser; Charles E. Roberts
- Produced by: Alfred T. Mannon
- Starring: Rex Bell; Ruth Mix; Buzz Barton; Stanley Blystone; Earl Dwire; Chuck Morrison
- Cinematography: Robert E. Cline
- Edited by: J. Logan Pearson
- Production companies: Resolute Productions, Inc.
- Distributed by: Resolute Pictures Corp.
- Release date: May 21, 1935
- Running time: 54 minutes
- Country: United States
- Language: English

Fighting Pioneers is a 1935 American Western film directed by Harry L. Fraser and written by Harry L. Fraser and Charles E. Roberts. The film stars Rex Bell, Ruth Mix, Buzz Barton, Stanley Blystone, Earl Dwire and Chuck Morrison. The film was released on May 21, 1935, by Resolute Pictures Corp.

== Cast ==
- Rex Bell as Lieutenant Bentley
- Ruth Mix as Wa-No-Na
- Buzz Barton as Splinters
- Stanley Blystone as Hadley
- Earl Dwire as Sergeant Luke
- Chuck Morrison as Sergeant O'Shaughnessy
- John Elliott as Major Dent
- Roger Williams as Captain Burton
- Chief Thundercloud as Eagle Feathers
- Chief Standing Bear as Chief Black Hawk
- Guate Mozin as Crazy Horse
