= The Tonto Kid =

1935 film

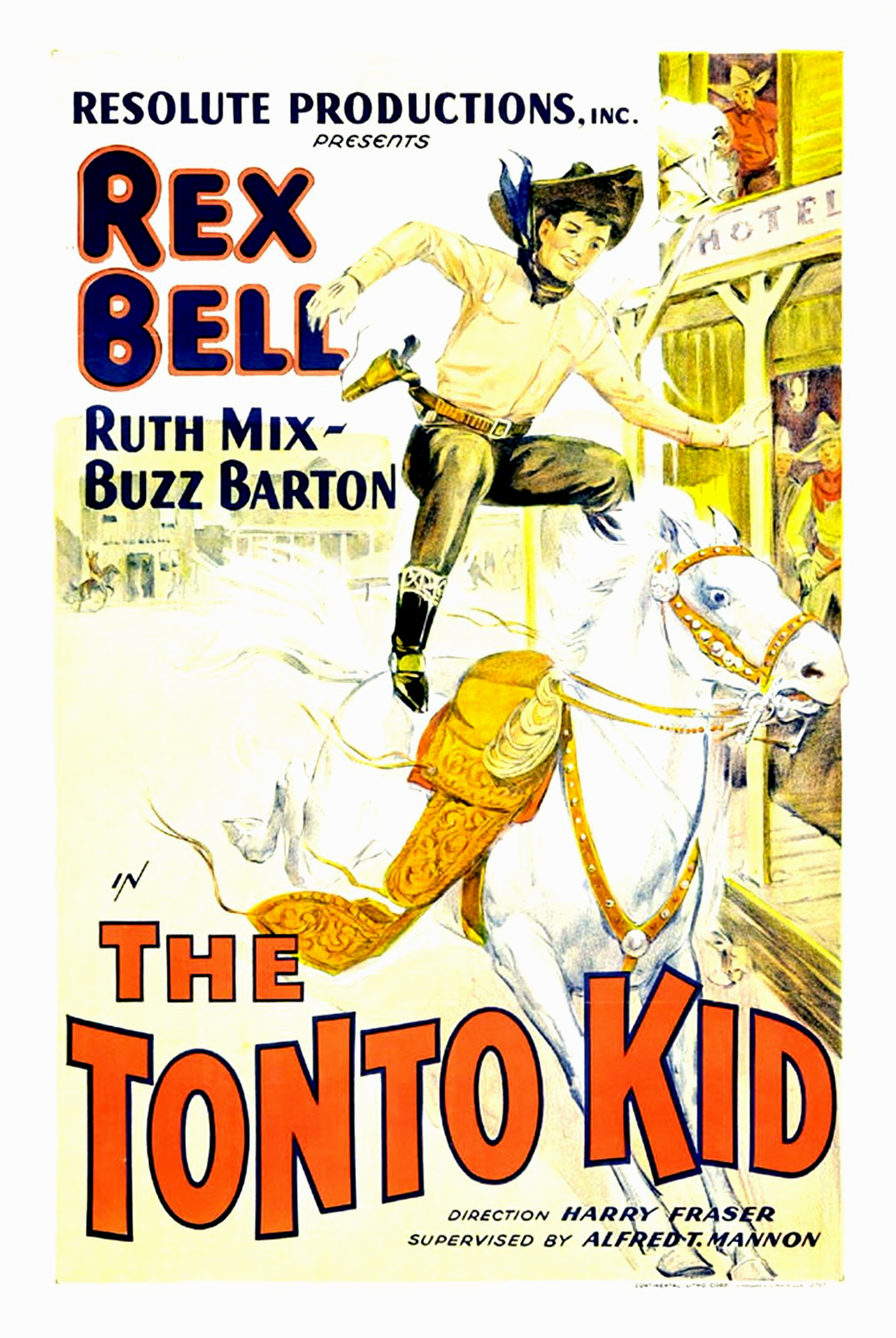
- Theatrical release poster
- Directed by: Harry L. Fraser
- Written by: Christopher Booth (novel The Daughter of Diamond D); Harry L. Fraser (screenplay)
- Produced by: Alfred T. Mannon (producer)
- Starring: See below
- Cinematography: Robert E. Cline; James Diamond
- Edited by: Holbrook N. Todd
- Release date: 1935
- Running time: 61 minutes
- Country: United States
- Language: English

The Tonto Kid is a 1935 American Western film directed by Harry L. Fraser.

== Cast ==
- Rex Bell as "Skeets" Slawson aka The Tonto Kid
- Ruth Mix as Nancy Cahill
- Buzz Barton as Wesley Fritch
- Theodore Lorch as Lawyer Sam Creech
- Joseph W. Girard as Rance Cartwright
- Barbara Roberts as Edna May Cartwright
- Jack Rockwell as Deputy Sheriff Hack Baker
- Murdock MacQuarrie as "Pop" Slawson
- Bert Lindley as Tom Quillan - Diamond D Foreman
- Jane Keckley as Mrs. Fritch, Wesley's Mother
- Stella Adams as Edna May's Landlady
