= The Riding Avenger =

1936 film directed by Harry S. Webb

- Directed by: Harry S. Webb
- Written by: Walton West; Norman Houston
- Produced by: Walter Futter
- Starring: Hoot Gibson; Ruth Mix; June Gale
- Cinematography: Paul Ivano
- Edited by: Carl Himm
- Production company: Diversion Pictures
- Distributed by: Diversion Pictures; Grand National Pictures
- Release date: June 15, 1936
- Running time: 58 minutes
- Country: United States
- Language: English

The Riding Avenger is a 1936 American Western film directed by Harry L. Fraser and starring Hoot Gibson, Ruth Mix and June Gale. Originally made by Diversion Pictures, it was picked up for distribution by Grand National Pictures.

== Cast ==
- Hoot Gibson as Buck Bonne - aka The Morning Glory Kid
- Ruth Mix as Chita Ringer
- Buzz Barton as Tony
- June Gale as Jessie McCoy
- Stanley Blystone as Mort Ringer
- Ed Cassidy as Marshal Tom
- Roger Williams as Jud Castro - Henchman
- Francis Walker as Welch - McCoy's Foreman
- Slim Whitaker as Slim - Jailbird
- Budd Buster as Bud - Jailbird

== Bibliography ==
- James Robert Parish & Michael R. Pitts. Film directors: a guide to their American films. Scarecrow Press, 1974.
