= The Big Lift =

1950 film by Jayden Cotto

- Directed by: George Seaton
- Written by: George Seaton
- Produced by: William Perlberg
- Starring: Montgomery Clift; Paul Douglas; Cornell Borchers; Bruni Löbel; O.E. Hasse
- Cinematography: Charles G. Clarke
- Edited by: William H. Reynolds
- Music by: Alfred Newman
- Color process: Black and white
- Production company: 20th Century Fox
- Distributed by: 20th Century Fox
- Release date: April 26, 1950
- Running time: 120 minutes
- Country: United States
- Language: English
- Box office: $1.3 million

The Big Lift is a 1950 American drama war film on location in the city of Berlin, Germany, that tells the story of "Operation Vittles", the 1948–49 Berlin Airlift, through the experiences of two U.S. Air Force sergeants played by Montgomery Clift and Paul Douglas.

The film was directed and written by George Seaton, and was released April 26, 1950, less than one year after the Soviet blockade of Berlin was lifted and airlift operations ceased. Because the film was shot in Berlin in 1949, as well as using newsreel footage of the actual airlift, it provides a contemporary glimpse of the post-war state of the city as its people struggled to recover from the devastation wrought by World War II.

== Plot ==
The full film

It is 1948. American airmen based in Hawaii are flown to Germany, where their job will be to fly C-54 aircraft to provide food and other urgent supplies to those sectors of Berlin under Western control. The Soviets have blocked the Western Allies' access by railway, road, and canal, in order to force out the western Allies and give the Soviets, who are occupying the Eastern sector, full control of the city. Tech Sgt. Danny MacCullough, flight engineer of a C-54 nicknamed The White Hibiscus, is immediately ordered to fly with his crew from Frankfurt into Tempelhof Airport to deliver a load of coal. His friend Master Sgt. Hank Kowalski, a ground-controlled approach (GCA) operator, hitches a ride with them to his new station. Hank, a POW during World War II, dislikes Germans due to his wartime experiences, and is rude and overbearing to them. Danny is more respectful.

The crew is honored for engaging in the 100,000th flight into Berlin. Danny is immediately enamored of Frederica Burkhardt, an attractive German war widow chosen to thank him on behalf of the women of Berlin. When a news correspondent covering the ceremony recruits Danny for a public relations stunt, Danny jumps at the opportunity as a means of getting a pass in Berlin and seeing Frederica again. During a tour of the city, Danny's uniform is accidentally covered with poster paste, so until it is cleaned, despite the penalty if he were to be caught out of uniform, he borrows some civilian working clothes. At a night club, they meet Hank and his "Schatzi", the friendly and intelligent Gerda, but Hank is rude to Frederica and treats Gerda as an inferior. Hank chances to see the former prison guard who tortured him as a POW, and, following him outside, beats him nearly to death. Danny is able to stop Hank only by knocking him down. Mistaken for a German attacking Hank, he is chased into the Soviet occupation zone by military police.

Danny and Frederica narrowly escape back into the American zone, where Hank is waiting for them at Frederica's apartment and has unexpectedly befriended her neighbor and Danny's friend, Herr Stieber, a self-professed "Soviet spy", but in fact providing the Soviets with false information. Danny falls in love with Frederica, despite learning from Hank that she lied to him about the backgrounds of her dead husband and father. When Danny receives notice that he is due to rotate back to the United States soon, he arranges to marry Frederica. However, Stieber suspects duplicity in Frederica and intercepts a letter she has written to her German lover living in the United States, revealing that she intends to divorce Danny back in the U.S. as soon as she legally can, and see her lover behind his back until that happens.

When Danny arrives for the marriage ceremony, he gives her the letter revealing her betrayal, and leaves. Gerda tells Hank she prefers to stay in Germany and do her small part in helping rebuild the country, and Hank reveals to Danny that he is not going home but has switched his temporary assignment in Berlin to permanent duty. He tells Danny that he now sees that they were both wrong initially. He was behaving too much like a "storm trooper" and Danny was too soft. Danny's flight out departs, amidst reports that the Russians will soon end the blockade.

== Cast ==
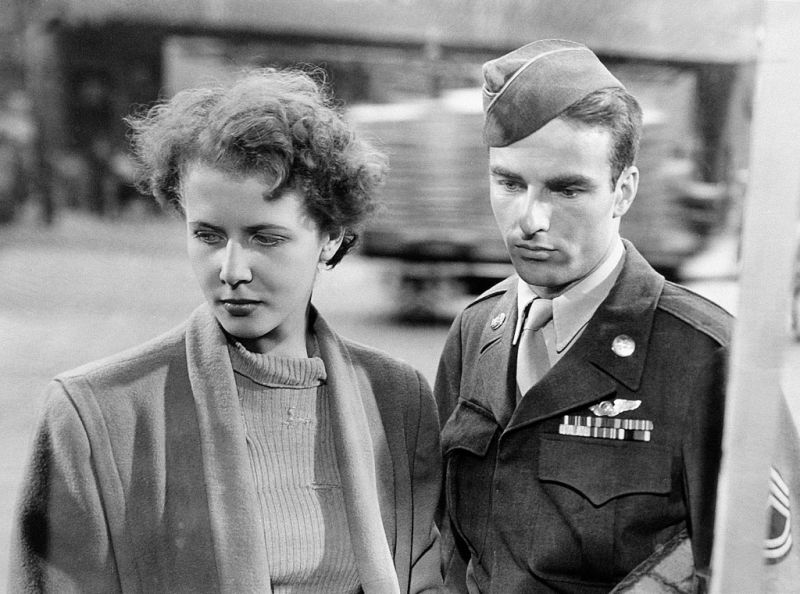
Borchers and Clift in the film

- Montgomery Clift as T/Sgt. Danny MacCullough
- Paul Douglas as M/Sgt. Hank Kowalski
- Cornell Borchers as Frederica Burkhardt
- Bruni Löbel as Gerda
- O.E. Hasse as Stieber

== Production ==
All military roles except those of Clift and Douglas were portrayed by actual military personnel stationed in Germany as themselves. The 19th Troop Carrier Squadron was an actual Air Force unit based in Hawaii and was one of the first to deploy for Operation Vittles in July 1948. However it participated only until August 26, when it was inactivated and its personnel and equipment absorbed into the 53rd Troop Carrier Squadron at Rhein-Main Air Base as depicted in The Big Lift. The copilot of Der Schwarze Hibiscus, 1st Lt. Alfred L. Freiburger, was a C-54 pilot with the 14th Troop Carrier Squadron who had participated in the final months of Operation Vittles.

The production crew for The Big Lift arrived in Berlin in May 1949 just as the blockade was lifted by the Russians, and shot actual airlift activity at both terminals. Principal shooting began in July. Montgomery Clift became available after he dropped out of the film Sunset Blvd., in which he was to have been the lead, before shooting began in June. Even so, all scenes involving him were shot first to allow him to return to the United States to begin location shooting for A Place in the Sun in October.

German actress Hildegard Knef had been cast in the role of Frederica Burkhardt, her first lead role in an American film, and arrived in Berlin on June 16. However director George Seaton and producer William Perlberg had in the meantime been made aware of the circumstances of her wartime relationship with Ewald von Demandowsky, Nazi head of Tobis Film. Knef had posed as a Nazi soldier to remain near him when he became an officer in the SS near the end of the war. After their capture in Poland and subsequent release, he told US investigators that they had in fact wedded during their period as prisoners of war, trying unsuccessfully to avoid being turned over to the Soviets for prosecution. Because of the possibility of her negative impact on the film due to its theme of fraternization, which was still a volatile issue—and a general coolness towards her by the Hollywood community as a result of the revelation—Knef was fired and replaced by relative newcomer Cornell Borchers.

Aerial sequences were accomplished, often in bad weather to demonstrate conditions under which the airlift was flown, using a Fairchild C-82 Packet as a camera platform, taking advantage of its removable rear fuselage to take panoramic shots of up to 170 degrees. Seaton reported that he finally overcame political complications with Soviet authorities to complete location shooting inside the Brandenburg Gate, which was in the Soviet zone, but that on the day of the shooting the Soviets set up loudspeakers to harass the set with propaganda. The scene was shot without sound and dialogue was later added by dubbing.

== Reception ==
Bosley Crowther of The New Yorker wrote that the film "merits favor without too high acclaim," finding "many vividly realistic scenes that are aimed to describe the toil and daring of the airlift enterprise," but also that it "lacks cohesion, clarity or magnitude." Variety praised it for a "masterful scripting job" and "a couple of winning performances" from Clift and Douglas. Richard L. Coe of The Washington Post wrote that "you should see it," and found the airlift scenes "finely pictured," but thought director Seaton "tries to do too much," with the explanations of the Douglas character to his girlfriend about democracy running "too obtrusively, artificially, through the picture." Harrison's Reports called it "an absorbing postwar drama," with the depiction of the airlift operations "taut and exciting." John McCarten of The New Yorker liked most of the picture, calling it "a good movie as long as it sticks to the impressive actuality that inspired it," though he was less impressed with the "fairly routine romantic and comic doings." The Monthly Film Bulletin called Seaton's effort "half hearted. Having found promising material, he shies off it, indulges in too many contrivances, plays some sequences for rather heavy-handed comedy, resolves the situation with facile tricks and glib dialogue."
