= Richard H. Kline =

American cinematographer (1926–2018)

- Born: Richard Howard Kline; November 15, 1926; Los Angeles, California, U.S.
- Died: August 7, 2018 (aged 91); Los Angeles, California, U.S.
- Education: Sorbonne University
- Occupation: Cinematographer
- Years active: 1943-1997
- Father: Benjamin H. Kline
- Relatives: Sol Halperin, Phil Rosen (uncles)
- Honours: American Society of Cinematographers Lifetime Achievement Award

Richard Howard Kline, ASC (November 15, 1926 - August 7, 2018) was an American cinematographer. He was a second-generation filmmaker, being the son of cinematographer Benjamin H. Kline and the nephew of ASC co-founder Phil Rosen and cinematographer Sol Halperin. He was twice Oscar nominated, for Camelot (1967) and King Kong (1976).

Other notable films he shot included The Boston Strangler (1968), The Andromeda Strain (1971), The Mechanic (1972), Soylent Green (1973), Mandingo (1975), The Fury (1978), Star Trek: The Motion Picture (1979), Body Heat (1981), and Howard the Duck (1986). He often worked with directors Richard Fleischer and Michael Winner.

== Early life ==
Kline was born in Los Angeles, California in 1926; his father was cinematographer Benjamin H. Kline, and his uncles were cinematographers Sol Halperin and Phil Rosen, the latter being a co-founder of the American Society of Cinematographers.

After Kline graduated from high school in 1943 at the age of 16, his father got him a job as a slate boy working for Columbia Pictures the same year, and one of the films he worked on as a slate boy was Cover Girl. He originally had aspiration of being a lawyer.

A year later, in 1944, Kline joined the U.S. Navy, serving from 1944 to 1946. He initially worked at the Naval Photographic Science Laboratory. By the time he had joined the Navy, he was already a first assistant cameraman. Kline was shipped out to the Pacific Theatre about the USS Los Angeles, where he would film battles out on the ocean.

Kline left the Navy in 1946, and went to Paris in 1948 to study art history at the Sorbonne, after he could not find a job in Hollywood.

== Career ==
After graduating from Sorbonne with a degree in Fine Art and Fine History, he married and returned to Hollywood, and returned to Columbia in 1951, working first as a camera assistant, and then a camera operator.

With the help of Sol Halperin, Kline began working as a cinematographer in 1963, and in 1967, he became a member of the American Society of Cinematographers. Kline worked extensively with director Richard Fleischer, and was nominated for the Academy Award for Best Cinematography on two occasions. Much of his work was in the realm of genre cinema, and he collaborated with directors like Fleischer, Michael Winner, Robert Wise, and Brian De Palma. Kline also worked alongside other cinematographers such as Charles Lawton Jr., Burnett Guffey, James Wong Howe, and Philip H. Lathrop.

He was nominated for an Academy Award for his work on Camelot in 1967, and for another Oscar for his work on King Kong in 1976, and was the recipient of the 20th annual ASC Lifetime Achievement Award in 2006.

== Death ==
A lifelong resident of Los Angeles, Kline died from natural causes at his home in Brentwood, at the age of 91, on August 7, 2018, the 51st anniversary of when he joined the A.S.C.

== Filmography ==
=== Film ===
Year	Title	Director	Notes
1966	Chamber of Horrors	Hy Averback	
1967	Camelot	Joshua Logan	
1968	Hang 'Em High	Ted Post	with Leonard J. South
1968	The Boston Strangler	Richard Fleischer	
1969	A Dream of Kings	Daniel Mann	
1969	Gaily, Gaily	Norman Jewison	
1970	The Moonshine War	Richard Quine	
1971	The Andromeda Strain	Robert Wise	
1971	Kotch	Jack Lemmon	
1972	Hammersmith Is Out	Peter Ustinov	
1972	When the Legends Die	Stuart Millar	
1972	The Mechanic	Michael Winner	with Robert Paynter
1972	Black Gunn	Robert Hartford-Davis	
1973	Soylent Green	Richard Fleischer	
1973	The Harrad Experiment	Ted Post	
1973	Battle for the Planet of the Apes	J. Lee Thompson	
1973	The Don Is Dead	Richard Fleischer	
1974	The Terminal Man	Mike Hodges	
1974	Mr. Majestyk	Richard Fleischer	
1975	Mandingo	Richard Fleischer	
1975	I Wonder Who's Killing Her Now?	Steven Hilliard Stern	
1976	Won Ton Ton, the Dog Who Saved Hollywood	Michael Winner	
1976	King Kong	John Guillermin	
1978	The Fury	Brian De Palma	
1978	Who'll Stop the Rain	Karel Reisz	
1979	Tilt	Rudy Durand	
1979	Star Trek: The Motion Picture	Robert Wise	
1980	Touched by Love	Gus Trikonis	
1980	The Competition	Joel Oliansky	
1981	Body Heat	Lawrence Kasdan	
1981	Lovespell	Tom Donovan	
1982	Death Wish II	Michael Winner	with Thomas Del Ruth
1983	Man, Woman and Child	Dick Richards	
1983	Deal of the Century	William Friedkin	
1983	Breathless	Jim McBride	
1984	Hard to Hold	Larry Peerce	
1984	All of Me	Carl Reiner	
1985	The Man with One Red Shoe	Stan Dragoti	
1986	Howard the Duck	Willard Huyck	
1986	Touch and Go	Robert Mandel	
1988	My Stepmother Is an Alien	Richard Benjamin	
1990	Downtown	Richard Benjamin	
1991	Double Impact	Sheldon Lettich	
1997	Meet Wally Sparks	Peter Baldwin	

=== Television ===
Year	Title	Notes
1960	Shotgun Slade	1 episode
1963	Mr. Novak	14 episode
1965	Honey West	3 episodes
1966	T.H.E. Cat	1 episode
1966	Twelve O'Clock High	1 episode
1966	The Monkees	Pilot episode
1975	Kate McShane	1 episode
1982	Coming Out of the Ice	TV movie
1996	Home Song	TV movie

== Awards and nominations ==
Award	Year	Category	Work	Result	Ref.
Academy Award	1968	Best Cinematography	Camelot	Nominated	
Academy Award	1977	Best Cinematography	King Kong	Nominated	
American Society of Cinematographers Award	2006	Lifetime Achievement Award	—N/a	Won	
