= Istanbul (film) =

1957 film by Joseph Pevney

- Film poster by Reynold Brown
- Directed by: Joseph Pevney
- Written by: Barbara Gray; Richard Alan Simmons
- Screenplay by: Seton I. Miller
- Story by: Seton I. Miller
- Produced by: Albert J. Cohen
- Starring: Errol Flynn; Cornell Borchers
- Cinematography: William H. Daniels
- Edited by: Sherman Todd
- Music by: Irving Gertz (uncredited)
- Color process: Technicolor
- Production company: Universal Pictures
- Distributed by: Universal Pictures
- Release date: January 23, 1957 (New York City)
- Running time: 84 minutes
- Country: United States
- Language: English
- Box office: 943,679 admissions (France)

Istanbul is a 1957 American CinemaScope film noir crime film directed by Joseph Pevney, and starring Errol Flynn and Cornell Borchers. It is a remake of the film Singapore, with the location of the action moved to Turkey. The plot involves an American pilot who becomes mixed up with various criminal activities in Istanbul.

== Plot ==
For the first time in five years, pilot Jim Brennan (Errol Flynn) flies to Istanbul, Turkey, but is immediately brought to the office of customs Inspector R. P. Nural (John Bentley) who suspects him of diamond smuggling. Jim goes to the hotel where he stayed previously, but his old room has American couple Charlie (Leif Erickson) and Marge Boyle (Peggy Knudsen) staying there.

At the café, Jim sits at his regular table and recalls the last time he was there, sharing a drink with German tourist Stephanie Bauer (Cornell Borchers), a beauty with whom he falls in love. She knows he has to fly for a living, and encourages him to accept a quick job flying businessmen to Cairo. On his return, an old friend, merchant Aziz Rakim (Vladimir Sokoloff) offers Jim a bracelet to give to Stephanie but a hidden compartment contains diamonds, which Jim stashes in his ceiling fan.

When he proposes to Stephanie, he also gives her the bracelet. She accepts his proposal, but back at his room, the couple encounter Paul Renkov (Werner Klemperer) who is looking for the diamonds. The next night, Paul follows Jim and with several henchmen, beats him up. Mr. Darius (Martin Benson), their leader, demands the diamonds. The police find Jim, and at headquarters, Nural tells him that Aziz was murdered likely due to his role in a shipment of stolen diamonds smuggled in a bracelet. Jim denies involvement in the theft and later asks Stephanie to come with him that night to Paris.

At her hotel room, Darius' men accost Stephanie and steal the bracelet. Jim finds Nural in his room, and reveals that he has impounded his aircraft and plans to keep him in custody until Jim leaves the country. Knowing he cannot retrieve the diamonds, Jim and Nural go to Stephanie's hotel, but the building is in flames. Jim tries to save his fiancée, but the blaze forces him to retreat.

Years later, Renkov finds Jim and tells him Darius wants to get his diamonds. Jim knows the married couple in his old room are in danger, and goes to the hotel, but is amazed to see Stephanie there. Claiming to be Karen Fielding, she leaves with her husband, Douglas Fielding (Torin Thatcher), the man who had saved her five years ago when her hotel had caught on fire. She had lost all of her earlier memories and does not recognize Jim.

Jim tries to press Stephanie about her past, but her husband asks him to leave them in peace. Later, clutching the bracelet Jim gave her, she secretly visits him at the café, trying to remember what he meant to her once. Jim attempts to retrieve the diamonds but is nearly caught by the inspector. He slips them into one of the Boyle's suitcases. Leaving the room he allows himself to be captured by Renkov and taken to an abandoned warehouse where Darius has already kidnapped Stephanie. Convincing Darius that she is the real thief, Jim slyly sets the warehouse ablaze.

Grabbing Stephanie who has gone into shock, he takes her back to her husband but the next morning as he prepares to fly out of Istanbul, Stephanie suddenly awakes and calls out Jim's name. Rushing to the airport, they see that Jim is caught with the diamonds although Nural decides to let him leave the country. As the aircraft takes off, her husband sees Stephanie's reaction and with the inspector's help, Jim is ordered to come back to Istanbul as someone wants to reunite with him.

== Cast ==
- Errol Flynn as James Brennan
- Cornell Borchers as Stephanie Bauer / Karen Fielding
- John Bentley as Inspector Nural
- Torin Thatcher as Douglas Fielding
- Leif Erickson as Charlie Boyle
- Peggy Knudsen as Marge Boyle
- Martin Benson as Mr. Darius
- Nat "King" Cole as Danny Rice
- Werner Klemperer as Paul Renkov
- Vladimir Sokoloff as Aziz Rakim
- Jan Arvan as Kazim
- Nico Minardos as Ali
- Ted Hecht as Lt. Sarac
- David Bond as Dr. Sarica
- Roland Varno as Mr. Florian
- Hillevi Rombin as Air Hostess

== Production ==
The film was a remake of Singapore based on a script by Seton I. Miller. Universal considered Jeff Chandler to play "Jim Brennan" and Robert Middleton to play "Mr. Darius." Eventually, Errol Flynn was cast.

It was the first film Flynn had made in Hollywood since Against All Flags (1952), also at Universal. It had been a difficult few years for Flynn, incurring tax trouble with the IRS and debts due to his attempt at making The Story of William Tell

Flynn was paid a reported £150,000 for the film, taking a flat salary instead of a percentage. All the money Flynn earned went to the payment of his debts.

Flynn signed his contract on February 15, 1956, and filming began the following week. Some scenes were shot on location in Istanbul, Turkey.

Flynn later wrote "I thought the film was to be made in Turkey, but it turned out I must go back to Hollywood In the States, people who saw me again on the screen said I looked dissipated. Great! I was tired of being called beautiful, as they had called me when I was younger."

Cornell Borchers was already attached to the film when Flynn signed on. It was the second of two films Borchers made for Universal, the first being Never Say Goobye; Universal were very big on hiring stars with international reputations at the time.)

Istanbul marked Peggy Knudsen's last film appearance.

=== Lawsuit ===
Kim Inc., which had the rights for a 1954 film called Istanbul starring Virginia Bruce, brought a suit against Universal claiming $450,000 in damages and an injunction stopping use of the name Istanbul. This was dismissed.

== Soundtrack ==
- When I Fall in Love

Music and lyrics by Victor Young and Edward Heyman
Sung by Nat 'King' Cole

- I Was a Little Too Lonely (and You Were a Little Too Late)

Music and lyrics by Jay Livingston and Ray Evans
Sung by Nat 'King' Cole

- Let's Love Again

Written by Milton Rosen and Everett Carter

- Venita

Written by Henry Mancini and Frederick Herbert

- Hi Ya Sailor

Written by Milton Rosen and Everett Carter

- Slightly Sentimental

Written by Milton Rosen and Everett Carter

- Theme song from Foxfire (1955)

Music by Henry Mancini
Lyrics by Jeff Chandler

== Reception ==
=== Critical ===
Bosley Crowther in his review for The New York Times, described Istanbul, as basically mediocre. "There is nothing to distinguish this production. The color is good and the CinemaScope inserts of the city by the Golden Horn are nice."

The Los Angeles Times called it "a moderately interesting drama of intrigue."

Film historian Leonard Maltin considered the film did not have many redeeming elements. "Sole bright spot: Cole singing "When I Fall in Love". Remake of Singapore.

Filmink magazine said "the script is full of echoes of Casablanca – it’s set in an exotic city, is about a shady hero who is (surprise) deep down a goodie and has a long-lost love, a black pianist friend and a friendly rivalry with the local chief of police – but they only serve to remind the viewer of what a better movie that was."

== See also ==
- List of American films of 1957
