= Too Much Beef =

- Theatrical release lobby card
- Directed by: Robert F. Hill
- Screenplay by: Robert F. Hill
- Story by: William Colt MacDonald
- Produced by: Arthur Alexander; Max Alexander
- Starring: Rex Bell; Constance Bergen; Forrest Taylor; Lloyd Ingraham; Marjorie O'Connell; Vincent Dennis
- Cinematography: Harry Forbes
- Edited by: Charles Henkel Jr.
- Production companies: M & A Alexander Productions
- Distributed by: Grand National Films
- Release date: June 6, 1936
- Running time: 60 minutes
- Country: United States
- Language: English

Too Much Beef is a 1936 American Western film written and directed by Robert F. Hill and starring Rex Bell, Constance Bergen, Forrest Taylor, Lloyd Ingraham, Marjorie O'Connell and Vincent Dennis. The film was released on June 6, 1936, by Grand National Films Inc.

Someone is adding beef to Rocky Brown's herds, changing the brands. He's accused of rustling.

== Cast ==
- Rex Bell as Johnny Argyle / Tucson Smith
- Constance Bergen as Ruth Brown
- Forrest Taylor as Hugh Stanford / Rocky Brown
- Lloyd Ingraham as Dynamite Murray
- Marjorie O'Connell as Sheila Murray
- Vincent Dennis as Senator Rogge
- George Ball as Tracy Paine
- Jimmy Aubrey as Shorty Rawlins
- John Cowell as George Thompson
- Fred Burns as Judge
- Steve Clark as Prosecutor
- Horace Murphy as Sheriff
