= Dewey, Oklahoma =

- City
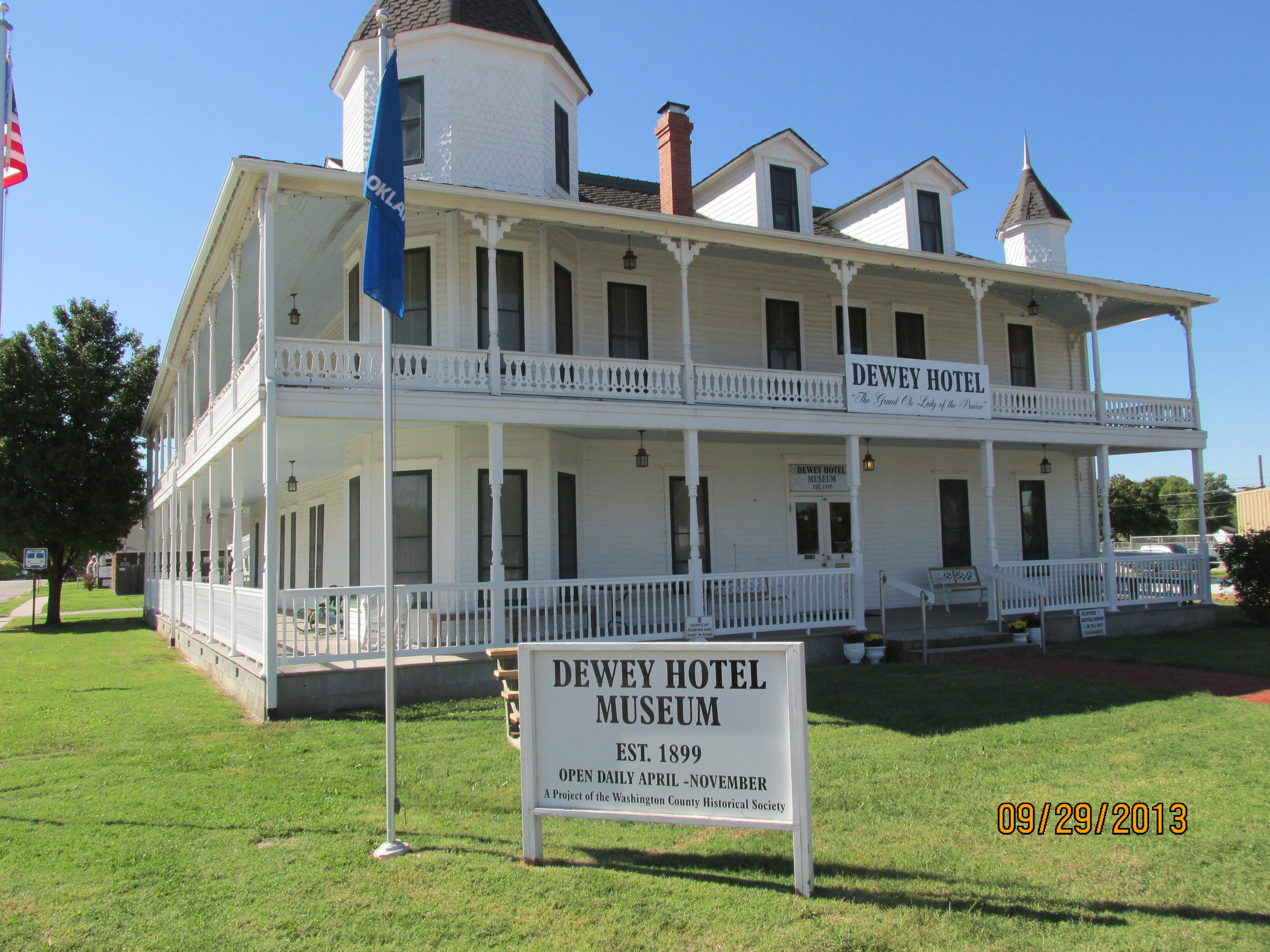
- Dewey Hotel, constructed 1899-1900, now a museum.
- Motto: "City of Vision"
- Location of Dewey in Oklahoma
- Coordinates: 36°47′25″N 95°56′01″W
- Country: United States
- State: Oklahoma
- County: Washington

Area
  - Total: 2.69 sq mi (6.98 km^{2})
  - Land: 2.69 sq mi (6.98 km^{2})
  - Water: 0 sq mi (0.00 km^{2})
- Elevation: 692 ft (211 m)

Population (2020)
  - Total: 3,372
  - Density: 1,251.2/sq mi (483.09/km^{2})
- Time zone: UTC-6 (Central (CST))
  - Summer (DST): UTC-5 (CDT)
- ZIP codes: 74006, 74029
- Area codes: 539/918
- FIPS code: 40-20550
- GNIS feature ID: 2410333
- Website: City of Dewey

Dewey is a city in Washington County, Oklahoma, United States. As of the 2020 census, Dewey had a population of 3,372. It is located near the north side of Bartlesville.

== History ==
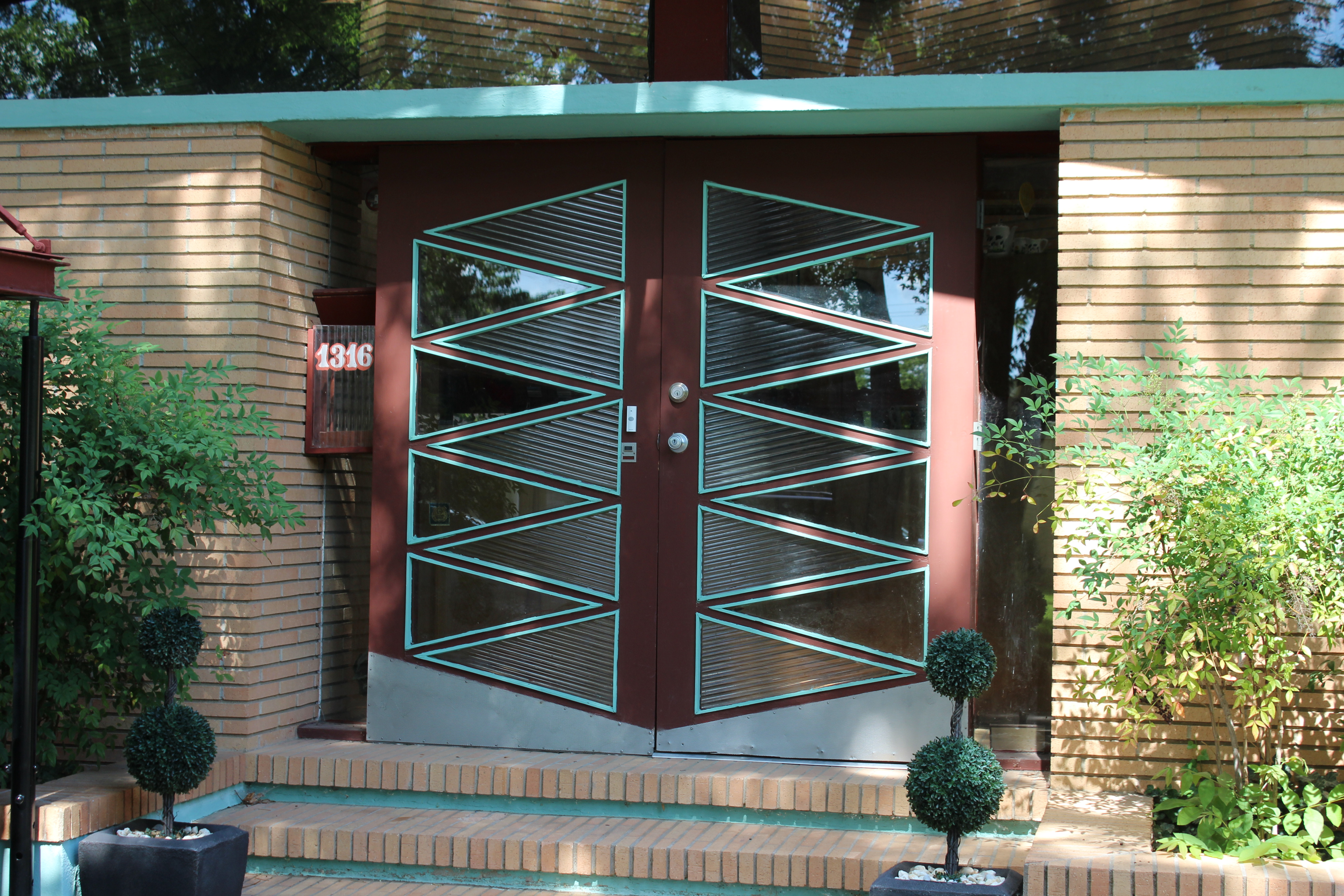
Entry of Bruce Goff-designed & NRHP-listed C.A. Comer House in Dewey

In 1899, Jacob Bartles moved his grist mill and trading post three miles north from Bartlesville to property he owned along the Atchison, Topeka and Santa Fe Railroad. He built the Dewey Hotel in the following year. The town was named for Admiral George Dewey. The first newspaper in town, the Dewey Eagle, began publication in 1900, and the Missouri, Kansas and Texas Railroad came to Dewey in 1903. The community was incorporated December 8, 1905.

== Geography ==
According to the United States Census Bureau, the city has a total area of 2.5 square miles (6.5 km^{2}), all land.

== Demographics ==
Historical population
| Census | Pop. | Note | %± |
|---|---|---|---|
| 1910 | 1,344 | | — |
| 1920 | 2,302 | | 71.3% |
| 1930 | 2,095 | | −9.0% |
| 1940 | 2,114 | | 0.9% |
| 1950 | 2,513 | | 18.9% |
| 1960 | 3,994 | | 58.9% |
| 1970 | 3,958 | | −0.9% |
| 1980 | 3,545 | | −10.4% |
| 1990 | 3,326 | | −6.2% |
| 2000 | 3,179 | | −4.4% |
| 2010 | 3,432 | | 8.0% |
| 2020 | 3,372 | | −1.7% |
U.S. Decennial Census

=== 2020 census ===
As of the 2020 census, Dewey had a population of 3,372, and the median age was 40.0 years; 26.1% of residents were under the age of 18, and 18.8% were 65 years of age or older. For every 100 females there were 90.2 males, and for every 100 females age 18 and over there were 85.3 males age 18 and over.

94.2% of residents lived in urban areas, while 5.8% lived in rural areas.

There were 1,336 households in Dewey, of which 34.1% had children under the age of 18 living in them. Of all households, 40.8% were married-couple households, 18.5% were households with a male householder and no spouse or partner present, and 33.6% were households with a female householder and no spouse or partner present.

About 30.3% of all households were made up of individuals, 15.6% had someone living alone who was 65 years of age or older, and there were 1,525 housing units, of which 12.4% were vacant. Among occupied housing units, 67.7% were owner-occupied and 32.3% were renter-occupied; the homeowner vacancy rate was 1.4% and the rental vacancy rate was 10.8%.

Racial composition as of the 2020 census
| Race | Percent |
|---|---|
| White | 69.2% |
| Black or African American | 1.8% |
| American Indian and Alaska Native | 12.8% |
| Asian | 0.1% |
| Native Hawaiian and Other Pacific Islander | <0.1% |
| Some other race | 2.4% |
| Two or more races | 13.7% |
| Hispanic or Latino (of any race) | 5.5% |

=== 2000 census ===
As of the 2000 census, there were 3,179 people, 1,298 households, and 869 families residing in the city. The population density was 1,252.2 inhabitants per square mile (483.5/km^{2}). There were 1,457 housing units at an average density of 573.9 per square mile (221.6/km^{2}). The racial makeup of the city was 78.64% White, 2.17% African American, 11.01% Native American, 0.06% Asian, 1.67% from other races, and 6.45% from two or more races. Hispanic or Latino of any race were 3.30% of the population.

There were 1,298 households, out of which 30.6% had children under the age of 18 living with them, 49.4% were married couples living together, 13.3% had a female householder with no husband present, and 33.0% were non-families. 30.0% of all households were made up of individuals, and 15.5% had someone living alone who was 65 years of age or older. The average household size was 2.37 and the average family size was 2.91.

In the city, the population was spread out, with 25.5% under the age of 18, 7.4% from 18 to 24, 25.6% from 25 to 44, 21.7% from 45 to 64, and 19.8% who were 65 years of age or older. The median age was 39 years. For every 100 females, there were 87.2 males. For every 100 females age 18 and over, there were 82.5 males.

The median income for a household in the city was $27,225, and the median income for a family was $35,844. Males had a median income of $28,309 versus $20,052 for females. The per capita income for the city was $15,429. About 13.4% of families and 16.5% of the population were below the poverty line, including 24.1% of those under age 18 and 11.9% of those age 65 or over.

== Transportation ==
Intercity bus service to the city is provided by Jefferson Lines.

== NRHP sites ==
The following sites in Dewey are listed on the National Register of Historic Places

- Dewey Hotel
- C.A. Comer House

The Tom Mix Museum, dedicated to the movie actor Tom Mix, is also located in Dewey.

== Notable people ==
- Jack Hartman, College basketball coach
- Fred Jordan, former State of Oklahoma representative from 2006 to 2014
- Olive Stokes Mix, actress
- Ruth Mix, actress
- Ted Austin Sprague, Hollywood actor, dancer, Choreographer, etc. (b.1939-d.2024)
