= Oasis (1955 film) =

French / German adventure film by Yves Allégret

- Directed by: Yves Allégret
- Written by: Joseph Kessel; Ben Barzman; Georges Kessel
- Produced by: Gerd Oswald; Luggi Waldleitner
- Starring: Michèle Morgan; Cornell Borchers
- Cinematography: Roger Hubert
- Edited by: Claude Nicole
- Music by: Paul Misraki
- Production companies: Criterion Productions; Roxy Film
- Distributed by: 20th Century Fox (USA)
- Release dates: 20 April 1955 (France); 17 April 1957 (USA)
- Running time: 104 minutes
- Countries: France; West Germany
- Language: French

Oasis (German: Oase) is a 1955 French-West German adventure film directed by Yves Allégret and starring Michèle Morgan, Cornell Borchers, Carl Raddatz and Pierre Brasseur. It was based on the 1933 novel The Commander by John Knittel. The screenplay was written by Joseph Kessel, Ben Barzman, and Georges Kessel. It was the first German-American co-production since World War II, with distribution via 20th Century Fox. It was shot at the Bavaria Studios in Munich and on location in Marseille as well as in Marrakesh, Casablanca, Agadir and Guelmim in French Morocco.

== Synopsis ==
It tells the story of two female smugglers and an inexperienced gold smuggler.

== Principal cast ==
- Michèle Morgan as Francoise Lignières
- Cornell Borchers as Karin Salstroem
- Pierre Brasseur as Antoine Vallin (In the French version)
- Carl Raddatz as Antoine Vallin (In the German version)
- Grégoire Aslan as Pérez

== Reception ==
The film did not perform well at the box office.
