= Maxie (1954 film) =

- Directed by: Eduard von Borsody
- Written by: Karl Leiter; Maria von der Osten-Sacken; Eduard von Borsody
- Produced by: Karl F. Sommer
- Starring: Willy Fritsch; Cornell Borchers; Fita Benkhoff
- Cinematography: Otto Baecker
- Music by: Carl de Groof
- Production company: Ring-Film
- Release date: 14 October 1954
- Running time: 94 minutes
- Country: Austria
- Language: German

Maxie is a 1954 Austrian comedy drama film directed by Eduard von Borsody, and starring Willy Fritsch, Cornell Borchers, and Fita Benkhoff. The film's sets were designed by the art director Julius von Borsody.

== Cast ==
- Willy Fritsch as Direktor Walter Rhomberg
- Cornell Borchers as Nora, seine Frau
- Fita Benkhoff as Irene, beider Freundin
- Paul Henckels as Schuster Timm
- Hubert von Meyerinck as Felix, Diener
- Sabine Eggerth as Maxi
- Viktor Braun
- Anita Coletta
- Peter Feldt as Anton
- Wolfgang Hebenstreit
- Melanie Horeschowsky as Frau Timm
- Karl Hruschka
- Michael Janisch
- Editha Jarno
- Josef Krastel
- Heli Lichten
- Karl Skraup as Herr Lorenz
- Loni von Friedl
- Olga von Togni
- Herbert Winopal

== Bibliography ==
- Bock, Hans-Michael & Bergfelder, Tim. The Concise CineGraph. Encyclopedia of German Cinema. Berghahn Books, 2009.
