= Harry M. Leonard =

- Born: June 22, 1900; Scranton, Pennsylvania, USA
- Died: December 17, 1985 (aged 85); Los Angeles County, California, USA
- Other names: H.M. Leonard; Harry Leonard
- Occupation: sound mixer
- Years active: 1930-1968

Harry M. Leonard (June 22, 1900 – December 17, 1985) was an American sound mixer who had just under 300 film credits, including films such as The Day the Earth Stood Still and Laura.

He was nominated at the 18th Academy Awards for Best Special Effects, for the film Captain Eddie. His nomination was shared with Fred Sersen, Roger Heman Sr. and Sol Halperin.

He created the "pew" sound effect used to indicate silenced gunfire for the film Blue, White and Perfect by modifying a stock ricochet sound recorded in 1939 for the fox sound archive.
