= Wild West Romance =

1928 film

- Directed by: R.L. Hough
- Screenplay by: Jack Cunningham; Delos Sutherland
- Story by: John Stone
- Starring: Rex Bell; Caryl Lincoln; Neil Neely; Billy Butts; Jack Walters; Fred Parker
- Cinematography: Sol Halperin
- Edited by: J. Logan Pearson; Barney Wolf
- Production company: Fox Film Corporation
- Distributed by: Fox Film Corporation
- Release date: June 10, 1928
- Running time: 55 minutes
- Country: United States
- Languages: Silent; English intertitles

Wild West Romance is a 1928 American silent Western film directed by R.L. Hough, and written by Jack Cunningham and Delos Sutherland. The film stars Rex Bell, Caryl Lincoln, Neil Neely, Billy Butts, Jack Walters, and Fred Parker. The film was released on June 10, 1928, by Fox Film Corporation. A print of Wild West Romance exists in the Czech Film Archive.

== Plot ==
A ne'er-do-well cowboy named Phil (Rex Bell) defeats a bandit and wins the love of a minister's daughter (Caryl Lincoln).

== Cast ==
- Rex Bell as Phil O'Malley
- Caryl Lincoln as Ruth Thorndyke
- Neil Neely as Brake Martin
- Billy Butts as The Kid
- Jack Walters as Sheriff
- Fred Parker as Beef Strickland
- Al Baffert as Blacksmith
- George C. Pearce as Rev. William Thorndyke
- Ellen Woonston as Mrs. Breez
