= The Scapegoat (1912 film) =

1912 film

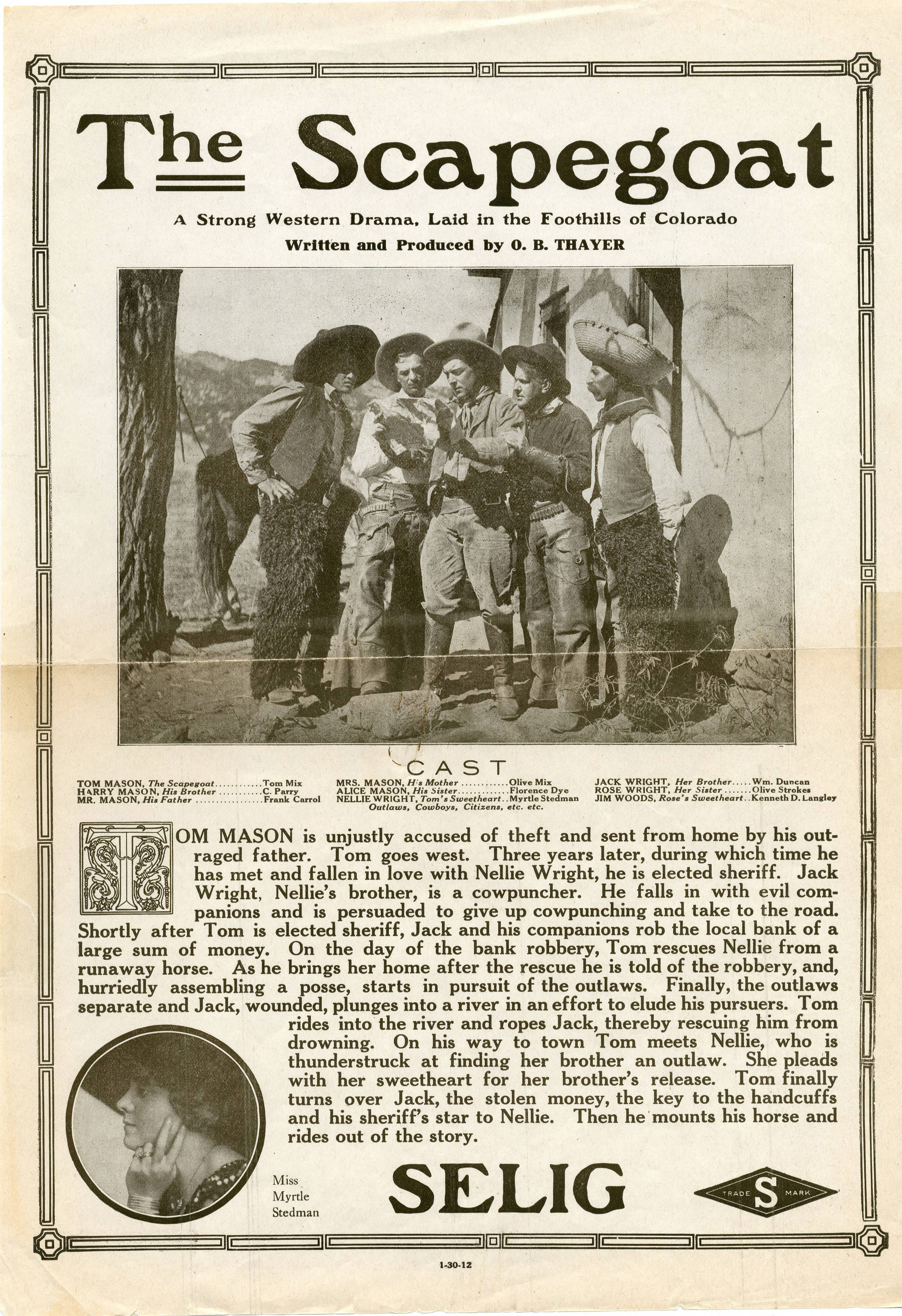
- Directed by: Otis B. Thayer
- Written by: Otis B. Thayer
- Produced by: William Selig
- Starring: Tom Mix; Myrtle Stedman; William Duncan
- Distributed by: Selig Polyscope Company
- Release date: January 30, 1912
- Running time: 10 min
- Country: United States
- Languages: Silent; English intertitles

The Scapegoat is a 1912 American short silent Western film directed by Otis B. Thayer and starring Tom Mix.

== Cast ==
- Tom Mix as Tom Mason, the Scapegoat
- Myrtle Stedman as Nellie Wright, Tom's sweetheart
- William Duncan as Jack Wright, Nellie's brother
- Olive Mix as Mrs Mason, Tom's mother
- Frank Carroll as Mr Mason, Tom's father
- Florence Dye as Alice Mason, Tom's sister
- C. Parry as Harry Mason, Tom's brother
- Olive Strokes as Rose Wright, Nellie's sister
- Kenneth D. Langley as Jim Woods, Rose's sweetheart

== Plot ==
After being wrongly accused of theft and ordered out of the family home by his irate father, Tom Mason goes west and settles in Colorado. He falls in love with Nellie and is later elected town sheriff. Nellie's brother Jack is a cowboy who gets involved with the wrong people and takes part in a bank robbery. Tom and Nellie are out of town and Nellie's horse bolts. Tom stops the horse and saves her life. On returning to town, Tom learns of the robbery and forms a posse. The outlaws split and Jack tries to swim across a river to evade his pursuers. He gets into difficulty and Tom ropes him to pull him out of the water. Nellie is astounded that her brother is a bank robber and pleads with Tom to release him. Tom reluctantly agrees but hands in his badge with the stolen money and rides away.
