= Saddle Aces =

- Theatrical release poster
- Directed by: Harry L. Fraser
- Screenplay by: Harry L. Fraser
- Based on: Deuces Wild by Jay J. Kaley
- Produced by: Alfred T. Mannon
- Starring: Rex Bell; Ruth Mix; Buzz Barton; Stanley Blystone; Earl Dwire; John Elliott
- Cinematography: Robert E. Cline
- Edited by: J. Logan Pearson
- Production companies: Resolute Productions, Inc.
- Distributed by: Resolute Pictures Corp.
- Release date: June 2, 1935
- Running time: 56 minutes
- Country: United States
- Language: English

Saddle Aces is a 1935 American Western film written and directed by Harry L. Fraser. The film stars Rex Bell, Ruth Mix, Buzz Barton, Stanley Blystone, Earl Dwire and John Elliott. The film was released on June 2, 1935, by Resolute Pictures Corp.

== Cast ==
- Rex Bell as Steve Brandt
- Ruth Mix as Jane Langton
- Buzz Barton as Montana Nick Sabot
- Stanley Blystone as Pete Sutton
- Earl Dwire as Sloan / El Canejo
- John Elliott as The Judge
- Roger Williams as Bill
- Chuck Morrison as Deputy Sheriff
- Chief Thundercloud as Canejo Rider Jose
- Mary MacLaren as Mrs. Sabot
