= Rogue for Hire =

TV series

Rogue for Hire is a 1960 TV series created by Seton I. Miller starring Neville Brand.

== Cast ==
- Neville Brand
- Jerome Thor
