= Custer's Last Stand (serial) =

Custer's Last Strand
- Theatrical release poster
- Directed by: Elmer Clifton
- Screenplay by: George Arthur Durlam; Eddie Granemann; William Lively
- Story by: George Arthur Durlam; Eddie Granemann; William Lively
- Produced by: Louis Weiss
- Starring: Rex Lease; Lona Andre; William Farnum; Ruth Mix; Jack Mulhall
- Cinematography: Bert Longenecker
- Edited by: George M. Merrick; Holbrook N. Todd
- Music by: Hal Chasnoff
- Distributed by: Stage & Screen Productions
- Release dates: January 2, 1936; April 3, 1936 (film)
- Running time: 15 chapters (328 min); 84 min (film)
- Country: United States
- Language: English

Custer's Last Stand is a 1936 American film serial based on the historical Custer's Last Stand at the Little Bighorn River. It was directed by Elmer Clifton, and starred Rex Lease, William Farnum and Jack Mulhall. It was produced by the Poverty Row studio Stage & Screen Productions, which went bust shortly afterwards as a victim of the Great Depression. This serial stars many famous and popular B-Western actors as well as silent serial star Helen Gibson playing Calamity Jane, Frank McGlynn Jr. as General Custer, and Allen Greer as Wild Bill Hickok.

In April of the same year, the serial was edited into an 84-minute feature film, which was released under the same name.

== Plot overview ==
The serial follows multiple plot threads, but centers on a "medicine arrow" taken from the local Indian tribe in a battle with white settlers. On the arrow is writing that points the way to a secret gold mine. A corrupt Indian agent (William Farnum) and his co-conspirators seek to recover the arrow in order to find the gold, and are willing to kill to do so.

The film depicts several historical characters, but in a purely fictitious setting. Cline (1984) writes that "the story ramble[s] through a series of loosely connected plots and subplots" leading up to the Battle of Little Big Horn.

== Cast ==
- Rex Lease as Kit Cardigan and his father John C. Cardigan
- Lona Andre as Belle Meade
- William Farnum as James Fitzpatrick
- Ruth Mix as Elizabeth Custer
- Jack Mulhall as Lieutenant Cook
- Nancy Caswell as Barbara Trent
- George Chesebro as Lieutenant Frank Roberts
- Dorothy Gulliver as Red Fawn
- Frank McGlynn Jr. as General George A. Custer
- Helen Gibson as Calamity Jane
- Josef Swickard as Major Henry Trent, MD
- Chief Thundercloud as Young Wolf
- Allen Greer as Wild Bill Hickok
- High Eagle as Crazy Horse
- Howling Wolf as Sitting Bull

=== Stunts ===
- Yakima Canutt
- Ken Cooper
- Carl Mathews
- Mabel Strickland (riding double)
- Wally West

== Reception ==
Custer's Last Stand was well received by action fans, regardless of its historical inaccuracies.

== Chapter titles ==
The chapters of the serial are titled as follows:

1. Perils of the Plains
2. Thundering Hoofs [sic]
3. Fires of Vengeance
4. The Ghost Dancers
5. Trapped
6. Human Wolves
7. Demons of Disaster
8. White Treachery
9. Circle of Death
10. Flaming Arrow
11. Warpath
12. Firing Squad
13. Red Panthers
14. Custer's Last Ride
15. The Last Stand

== See also ==
- Battle of the Little Bighorn, commonly known as "Custer's last stand"
- List of film serials by year
- List of film serials by studio
