= Ruth Mix =

American actress

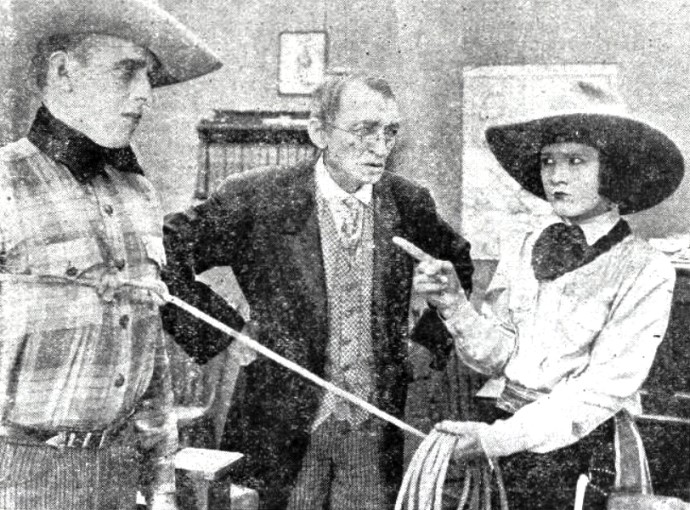
- Mix at right in still from That Girl Oklahoma (1926)
- Born: July 13, 1912; Dewey, Oklahoma, U.S.
- Died: September 21, 1977 (aged 65); Corpus Christi, Texas, U.S.
- Occupation: Film actress
- Spouses: Douglas Gilmore (m. 1930; ann. 1932) Harry Knight (m. 1935, divorced) John A. Guthrie (m. 1938, divorced) Howard Cragg (m. 1939; died 1942) William Hickman Hill (died 1976)
- Children: 3
- Parents: Tom Mix (father); Olive Stokes Mix (mother)

Nadine Ruth Mix or Ruth Jane Mix (July 13, 1912 – September 21, 1977) was an American actress.

== Early years ==
Mix was born in Dewey, Oklahoma, to Tom and Olive Stokes Mix. She had a half-sister, Thomasina Mix.

After they divorced, when Mix was 15, her mother asked a Los Angeles court to order that the girl's allowance be increased from $50 per month to $1,500 per month. The judge denied the request until someone was appointed guardian of her estate and said she would have to become a "boarding pupil" rather than a "day school pupil". By January 1929, her monthly allowance had been increased to $225, but her spending led a judge to chastise her when a debt-collection agency attached an allowance check after she ran up a $1,000 hotel bill in New York. The judge admonished her to "try to be more modest about her ways of living." The monthly allocation ended via another court ruling in 1930 after she married.

== Career ==
Mix started her acting career following in her father's footsteps. In the mid-1920s she starred in several silent films. She made a total of twelve westerns, particularly The Tonto Kid, Fighting Pioneers, Saddle Aces and Gunfire, all made in 1935. In 1936 she starred in three cliffhanger serials, The Black Coin, The Amazing Exploits of the Clutching Hand, and Custer's Last Stand. She played the female lead in a few B-westerns, starring alongside Wally Walls and Hoot Gibson.

Mix retired from acting, becoming a roping artist and trick rider for her father's circus and wild west show. In 1929, she performed in vaudeville, performing "in a novelty offering including singing and dancing" and heading a Rodeo Revue show. The Rodeo Revue had a cast of 35, featuring comedian Jed Dooley and including Toby Tobias and his orchestra and an eight-woman ballet group in addition to Mix and her horse, Lindy.

Her father's show went bankrupt by the end of the 1930s, during the Great Depression. In 1939, she was part of the Wild West Show at the New York World's Fair, and in 1941 she, along with Howard Cragg and B. H. Jones, headed a rodeo show that appeared at fairs.

== Personal life ==
On June 9, 1930, Mix married actor Douglas Gilmore in Yuma, Arizona. They separated in July 1931, with Mix planning to go to court to seek an annulment. The annulment was granted in July 1932, to become effective automatically 90 days later. Mix and Harry Knight, a "champion Canadian bronco buster" eloped to Reno, Nevada, and were married on June 5, 1935.

== Death ==
On September 21, 1977, Mix died in Corpus Christi, Texas, aged 65. Her name then was Ruth Hill, and she had lived in Corpus Christi since 1954.

== Filmography ==
| Year | Title | Role | Notes |
|---|---|---|---|
| 1926 | That Girl Oklahoma | | |
| 1926 | Tex | | |
| 1927 | The Little Boss | | |
| 1928 | Four Sons | Johann's Girl | uncredited |
| 1931 | Red Fork Range | Ruth Farell | |
| 1934 | The Tonto Kid | Nancy Cahill | |
| 1934 | Gunfire | Mary Vance | |
| 1935 | Fighting Pioneers | Wa-No-Na | |
| 1935 | Saddle Aces | Jane Langton | |
| 1936 | Custer's Last Stand | Elizabeth Custer | serial |
| 1936 | The Clutching Hand | Shirley McMillan | serial |
| 1936 | The Riding Avenger | Chita Ringer | |
| 1936 | The Black Coin | Dorothy Dale | |
