= Here Comes Mr. Jordan =

1941 film by Alexander Hall

- Theatrical release poster
- Directed by: Alexander Hall
- Screenplay by: Sidney Buchman; Seton I. Miller
- Based on: Heaven Can Wait; 1938 play by Harry Segall
- Produced by: Everett Riskin
- Starring: Robert Montgomery; Claude Rains; Evelyn Keyes; James Gleason; Edward Everett Horton; Rita Johnson; John Emery
- Cinematography: Joseph Walker
- Edited by: Viola Lawrence
- Music by: Friedrich Hollaender
- Production company: Columbia Pictures
- Distributed by: Columbia Pictures
- Release date: August 7, 1941
- Running time: 94 minutes
- Country: United States
- Language: English

Here Comes Mr. Jordan is a 1941 American fantasy romantic comedy film directed by Alexander Hall, in which a boxer, mistakenly taken to Heaven before his time, is given a second chance back on Earth. It stars Robert Montgomery, Claude Rains, Evelyn Keyes, James Gleason, Edward Everett Horton, Rita Johnson, and John Emery.

The film screenplay, based on Harry Segall's 1938 play Heaven Can Wait (originally titled It Was Like This), was written by Sidney Buchman and Seton I. Miller. The working titles for the film were Heaven Can Wait and Mr. Jordan Comes to Town.

Horton and Gleason reprised their roles in the film's sequel Down to Earth (1947), while Roland Culver took on the role of Mr. Jordan. Warren Beatty later remade the film in 1978 as Heaven Can Wait. The 2001 film Down to Earth, starring Chris Rock, is also based on the play. The 1943 film Heaven Can Wait, itself also a Best Picture Oscar nominee, has no connection to the source material for Here Comes Mr. Jordan.

== Plot ==
On May 11, 1941, boxer and amateur pilot Joe Pendleton, affectionately known as "the Flying Pug", flies his small aircraft to his next fight in New York City but crashes when a control cable severs. His soul is retrieved by 7013, an officious angel who assumed that Joe could not have survived. Joe's manager, Max "Pop" Corkle, has his body cremated. In the afterlife, the records show his death was a mistake; he was supposed to live for 50 more years. The angel's superior Mr. Jordan confirms this, but without his body, Joe will have to take over a newly dead corpse. Jordan explains that a body is just something that is worn like an overcoat; inside, Joe will still be himself. Joe insists that it be someone in good physical shape because he wants to continue his boxing career.

After Joe turns down several "candidates", Jordan takes him to see the body of a crooked but extremely wealthy banker and investor named Bruce Farnsworth, who has just been drugged and drowned in a bathtub by his wife Julia and his secretary Tony Abbott. Joe is reluctant to take over a life so unlike his previous one, but when he sees the murderous pair mockingly berating Bette Logan, whose father's name has been misused by Farnsworth to sell worthless securities, he changes his mind and agrees to take over Farnsworth's body. (Note: The audience continues to see Montgomery as Pendleton, but everyone in the film, including his wife and secretary (who are astonished to see that the murder was not successful after all), see and hear Farnsworth.)

As Farnsworth, Joe repays all the investors and has Bette's father exonerated. He sends for Corkle and convinces him that he is Joe (by playing his saxophone just as badly as he did in his previous incarnation). With Farnsworth's money to smooth the way, Corkle trains him and arranges a bout to decide who will next fight the current heavyweight champion, but Jordan returns to warn Joe that while he is destined to be the champion, it cannot happen that way. Joe has just enough time to tell Bette, with whom he has fallen in love, that if a stranger (especially if he is a boxer) approaches her, to give him a chance. Then he is shot by Tony. While Joe returns to a ghostly existence, Farnsworth's body is hidden, with everyone believing Farnsworth has simply disappeared. Corkle hires a private investigator to find him.

Accompanied by Jordan, Joe goes to retrieve the lucky saxophone he left on Farnsworth's piano and finds the police conducting a group interrogation. Talking to himself, Corkle wanders into the room looking for Joe or Jordan. Corkle has explained about Joe, Mr. Jordan and the body-switching to the police detective who thinks he is mentally ill. Joe manages to nudge Corkle into turning on the radio to listen to the championship fight and hears that Murdock has collapsed from a slight grazing punch. Jordan reveals that the boxer was shot by gamblers because he refused to throw the fight. Joe takes over Murdock's body and wins the title. Back at the mansion, Corkle hears one of the radio announcers mention a saxophone hanging at ringside and seeing the saxophone gone from the room, realizes Joe has assumed Murdock's body.

Corkle races down to the dressing room. There Joe passes along information from Jordan that Farnsworth's body is in a refrigerator in the basement of the mansion. Corkle tells the detective, who promptly has Julia and Tony arrested. As Murdock, Joe fires his old crooked manager and hires Corkle. Jordan reveals to Joe that this is his destiny; he can be Murdock and live his life.

Healing the gunshot wound and at the same time removing Joe's memory of his past life, Jordan hangs around for a bit longer until Bette arrives. She wanted to see Corkle but runs into Murdock instead. The pair feel they have met before. The two go off together while Jordan smiles and says "So long, champ."

== Cast ==
- Robert Montgomery as Joe Pendleton
- Evelyn Keyes as Bette Logan
- Claude Rains as Mr. Jordan
- Rita Johnson as Julia Farnsworth
- Edward Everett Horton as Messenger 7013
- James Gleason as Max "Pop" Corkle
- John Emery as Tony Abbott
- Donald MacBride as Insp. Williams
- Don Costello as Lefty
- Halliwell Hobbes as Sisk
- Benny Rubin as "Bugsy" (the handler)
- Lloyd Bridges as Mr. Sloan, the co-pilot
- Eddie Bruce as reporter
- John Ince as bill collector
- Bert Young as taxi driver
- Warren Ashe as Charlie
- Ken Christy as plainclothesman
- Chester Conklin as newsboy
- Joseph Crehan as Doctor
- Mary Currier as Secretary
- Edmund Elton as elderly man
- Tom Hanlon as announcer
- Bobby Larson as "Chips"
- Heinie Conklin as reporter (uncredited)

== Production ==
Mr. Jordan arranges transport of souls on an aircraft in Heaven. (Note: The studio mock-up of the heavenly aircraft resembled contemporary designs.)

Columbia Pictures president Harry Cohn was persuaded to try a somewhat "risky" project in Here Comes Mr. Jordan, despite his well-founded policy of building on past successful ventures, rather than financing more adventurous films. An original 1938 stage play, Heaven Can Wait by Harry Segall, was adapted to form the basis of the film. Broadway producer Jed Harris had planned to produce the play on the New York stage, until Columbia purchased the rights as a vehicle for Cary Grant. While it was still in pre-production, Montgomery was borrowed from Metro-Goldwyn-Mayer to star in the film. (Note: Robert Montgomery was initially disappointed in MGM releasing him to star in a film for one of the "Poverty Row" studios.)

Principal photography began on April 21, 1941, and ran until June 5 of that year. Location shooting took place at Providencia Ranch, California, and on Universal City sound stages.

== Reception ==
=== Critical response ===
Upon Here Comes Mr. Jordan's world premiere at Radio City Music Hall, film critic Theodore Strauss of The New York Times noted, "Columbia has assembled its brightest people for a delightful and totally disarming joke at heaven's expense." He further described the film as "gay, witty, tender and not a little wise. It is also one of the choicest comic fantasies of the year."

Variety called Montgomery's acting "a highlight in a group of excellent performances" and praised Hall's direction for "expert handling of characters and wringing utmost interest out of every scene."

Harrison's Reports wrote, "Here is a picture that is praiseworthy from many angles; for one thing, the theme is novel and the plot developments ingenious; for another, the production values are good, and the acting and direction are of a high standard."

The review in The Film Daily opined, "Producer Everett Riskin, noted for his successes in the field of comedy, had no cinch with this property which might easily have backfired with an inexperienced hand at the helm. But Riskin's talent and knowledge has placed this finished product very near the peak of perfection in film making." Here Comes Mr. Jordan placed fifth on the year-end poll of 548 critics nationwide at The Film Daily, naming it one of the best films of 1941.

Russell Maloney of The New Yorker called the film "one of the brightest comedies of the year ... Mr. Rains' acting is the kind that makes the word 'ham' a word of endearment, and I mean that for a compliment."

The film's premise of a protagonist receiving a second chance through the intervention of angels inspired other films throughout the ensuing decade, including I Married an Angel (1942), A Guy Named Joe (1943), and Angels in the Outfield (1951).

Film critic Leonard Maltin noted that Here Comes Mr. Jordan was an "Excellent fantasy-comedy of prizefighter Montgomery accidentally sent to heaven before his time, forced to occupy a new body on earth. Hollywood moviemaking at its best, with first-rate cast and performances."

On the review aggregator website Rotten Tomatoes, 100% of 21 critics' reviews are positive, with an average rating of 7.5/10.

=== Accolades ===
Harry Segall won the Academy Award for Best Story, while Sidney Buchman and Seton I. Miller won for Best Screenplay. Nominations included: Best Picture, Montgomery for Best Actor in a Leading Role, Hall for Best Director, Gleason for Best Actor in a Supporting Role and Joseph Walker for Best Cinematography, Black-and-White.

Here Comes Mr. Jordan was preserved by the UCLA Film and Television Archive with the cooperation of Columbia Pictures and the Library of Congress.

=== Home media ===
Here Comes Mr. Jordan was originally going to be released on VHS and Betamax in November 1979 as one of Columbia Pictures Home Entertainment's launch titles, but because of the financial success of Midnight Express, the release was cancelled and Midnight Express took Here Comes Mr. Jordan's place in the launch lineup. Due to this, Columbia did not release the film on home video until 1982.

On June 14, 2016, The Criterion Collection released a fully restored version of the film on DVD and Blu-ray.

== Remakes ==
On January 26, 1942, Claude Rains, Evelyn Keyes, and James Gleason reprised their roles in a Lux Radio Theatre broadcast with Cary Grant, the original choice for the lead role, co-starring. A made-for-television adaptation was aired as an episode of The DuPont Show of the Month as "Heaven Can Wait" in 1960 starring Tony Franciosa as Joe Pendleton and Robert Morley as Mr. Jordan. Here Comes Mr. Jordan was remade as Heaven Can Wait (1978), starring Warren Beatty, Buck Henry, and Julie Christie. Ice Angel, a 2000 film for Fox Family starring Nicolle Tom and Tara Lipinski remade it with the "twist" that it was an adult male hockey player who was forced to take over the body of a teenaged female figure skater. Down to Earth (2001), sharing the title with the sequel to Here Comes Mr. Jordan, starred Chris Rock. An Indian Hindi remake of Here Comes Mr. Jordan titled Jhuk Gaya Aasman was released in 1968. The Punjabi film Mar Gaye Oye Loko is also inspired by Here Comes Mr. Jordan. A pornographic remake, Debbie Does Dallas ... Again (which reimagines the person taken too soon as the lead character from Debbie Does Dallas), was released in 2007.

== In other media ==
In Road to Morocco (1942), one of Bob Hope's characters, the deceased Aunt Lucy, comes to him in a dream but then cuts it short, saying "Here comes Mr. Jordan", a homage to the film of the same name.

== See also ==
- List of boxing films
- List of films about angels
- List of films with a 100% rating on Rotten Tomatoes
