= The Leathernecks Have Landed =

1936 film by Howard Bretherton

- Theatrical release poster
- Directed by: Howard Bretherton
- Screenplay by: Seton I. Miller
- Story by: Wellyn Totman; James Gruen
- Produced by: Ken Goldsmith
- Starring: Lew Ayres; Isabel Jewell; James Ellison; James Burke; J. Carrol Naish; Clay Clement
- Cinematography: Jack A. Marta; Ernest Miller
- Edited by: Robert Jahns
- Music by: Arthur Kay
- Production company: Republic Pictures
- Distributed by: Republic Pictures
- Release date: February 17, 1936
- Running time: 67 minutes
- Country: United States
- Language: English

The Leathernecks Have Landed is a 1936 American adventure film directed by Howard Bretherton and written by Seton I. Miller. The film stars Lew Ayres, Isabel Jewell, James Ellison, James Burke, J. Carrol Naish and Clay Clement. It was released on February 17, 1936 by Republic Pictures.

== Cast ==
- Lew Ayres as Woodruff "Woody" Davis
- Isabel Jewell as Brooklyn
- James Ellison as Mac MacDonald
- James Burke as Corrigan
- J. Carrol Naish as Irenov
- Clay Clement as Capt. Halstead
- Maynard Holmes as Pvt. "Tubby" Waters
- Ward Bond as Tex
- Paul Porcasi as Enrico "Rico" Venetzi
- Claude King as British Agent in Shanghai
- Christian Rub as Schooner Captain
- Joe Sawyer as Sgt. Regan
- Henry Mowbray as British Army Major
- John Webb Dillon as Marine Captain
- Lal Chand Mehra as Sam
