= Fighting Texans =

1933 film

- Theatrical release poster
- Directed by: Armand Schaefer
- Screenplay by: Wellyn Totman
- Produced by: Paul Malvern
- Starring: Rex Bell; Luana Walters; Betty Mack; Yakima Canutt; Wally Wales; George "Gabby" Hayes
- Cinematography: Archie Stout
- Edited by: Carl Pierson
- Production company: Monogram Pictures
- Distributed by: Monogram Pictures
- Release date: June 15, 1933
- Running time: 60 minutes
- Country: United States
- Language: English

Fighting Texans is a 1933 American Western film directed by Armand Schaefer and written by Wellyn Totman. The film stars Rex Bell, Luana Walters, Betty Mack, Yakima Canutt, Wally Wales and George "Gabby" Hayes. The film was released on June 15, 1933, by Monogram Pictures.

== Cast ==
- Rex Bell as Randy Graves
- Luana Walters as Joanne Carver
- Betty Mack as Rita Walsh
- Yakima Canutt as Hank
- Wally Wales as Pete
- George "Gabby" Hayes as Pop Martin
- Alan Bridge as Gus Durkin
- Gordon De Main as Julian Nash
- Lafe McKee as Sheriff Carver
- George Nash as Albert
