= Sol Halperin =

- Born: February 16, 1902; Newark, New Jersey, USA
- Died: May 4, 1977 (aged 75); Beverly Hills, Los Angeles, California, USA
- Other name: Sol Halprin
- Occupations: Special effects artist and cinematographer
- Years active: 1928–1959
- Family: Richard H. Kline (nephew) (born 1926)

Sol Halperin (February 16, 1902 – May 4, 1977) was an American special effects artist as well as a cinematographer. He was nominated at the 18th Academy Awards for Best Special Effects, for the film Captain Eddie. His nomination was shared with Fred Sersen, Roger Heman Sr. and Harry M. Leonard.

His nephew is Academy Award nominee Richard H. Kline.

== Selected filmography ==
=== Special effects ===
- Stanley and Livingstone (1939)
- Fallen Angel (1945)
- Leave Her to Heaven (1945)
- Captain Eddie (1945)
- Johnny Comes Flying Home (1946)
- Centennial Summer (1946)

=== As a cinematographer ===
- Wild West Romance (1928)
- Girl-Shy Cowboy (1928)
- Taking a Chance (1928) (as Sol Halprin)
- Married in Hollywood (1929)
- Double Cross Roads (1930)
- The Robe (1953); co-developed the CinemaScope process with Gordon Laube and Earl Ira Sponable
