= Rex Bell =

American actor and politician (1903–1962)

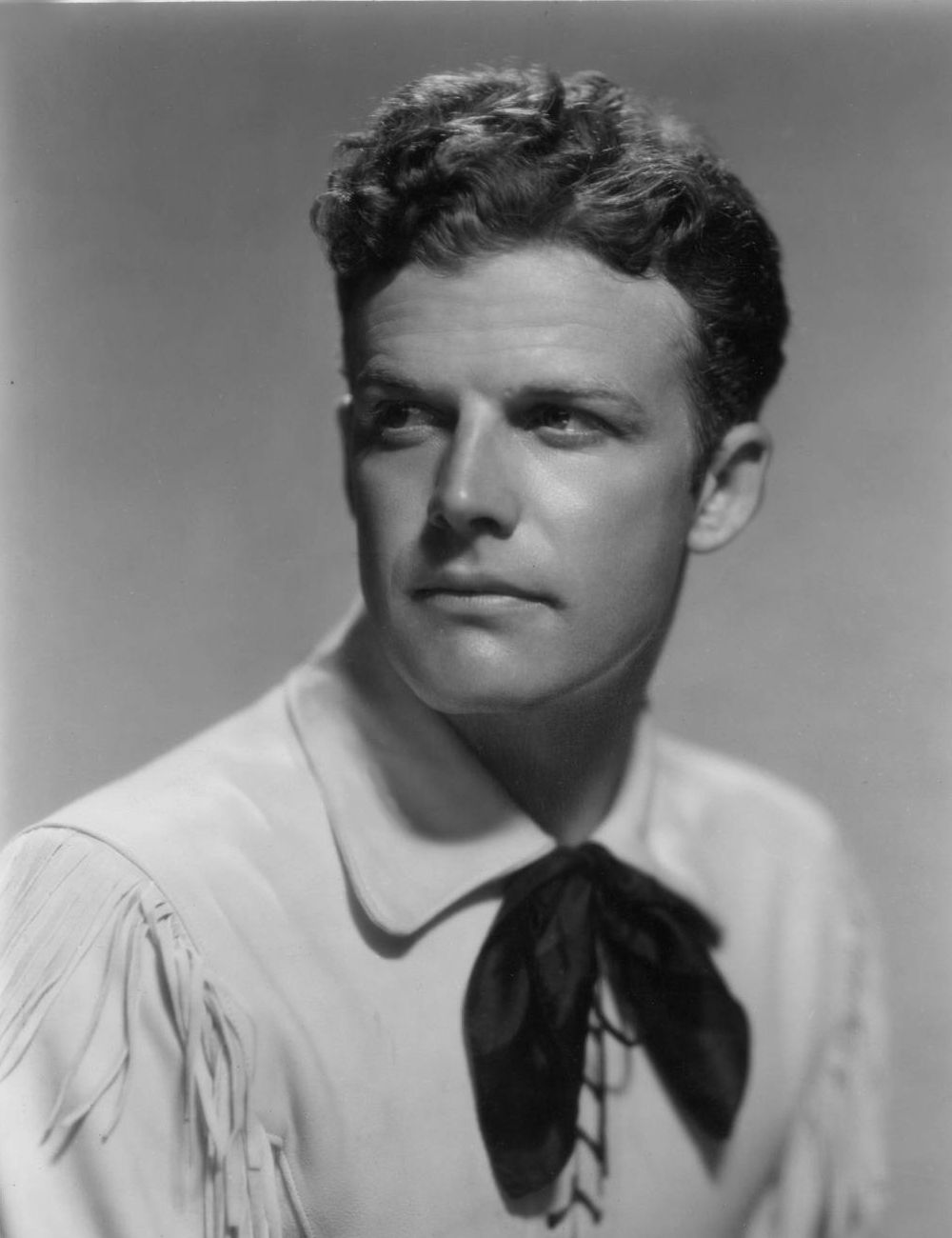
- Rex Bell in 1931

21st Lieutenant Governor of Nevada
- In office January 1, 1955 – July 4, 1962
- Governor: Charles H. Russell; Grant Sawyer
- Preceded by: Clifford A. Jones
- Succeeded by: Maude Frazier

Personal details
- Born: George Francis Beldam; October 16, 1903 Chicago, Illinois, U.S.
- Died: July 4, 1962 (aged 58) Las Vegas, Nevada, U.S.
- Party: Republican
- Spouse: Clara Bow (m. 1931)
- Children: 2
- Profession: Actor, politician

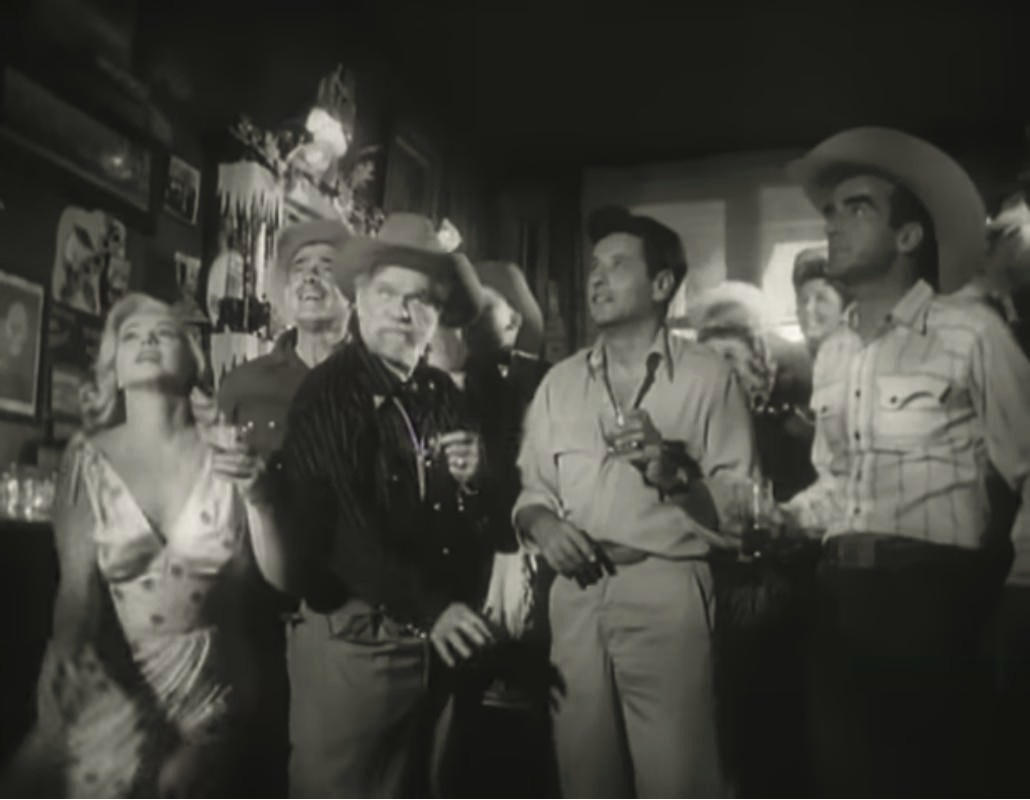
Marilyn Monroe, Clark Gable, Rex Bell, Eli Wallach, and Montgomery Clift in The Misfits (1961)

Rex Bell (born George Francis Beldam; October 16, 1903 – July 4, 1962) was an American actor and politician. He was known for his roles in Westerns, and at one time was considered a successor to Tom Mix. He married actress Clara Bow in 1931.

Bell later became involved in politics with the Nevada Republican Party and was the 21st lieutenant governor of Nevada from 1955 until his death in 1962. He was the second Lieutenant Governor to die in office after Henry C. Davis and as of 2025, he is the most recent to have died in office.

== Early years ==
Bell was born George Francis Beldam in Chicago, Illinois on October 16, 1903.

== Film career ==
Bell made his film debut in Wild West Romance in 1928, and went on to act in a number of films, mostly Westerns, in which he had the lead role. Fox Film executives were reported to be grooming Bell to be a successor to Tom Mix. He left the movie industry in 1936, although he had generally small roles in a few later films.

In 1931, Bell and his wife, actress Clara Bow, founded the Walking Box Ranch, at Searchlight, Nevada.

His final film appearance was an uncredited but very prominent role as a loquacious old cowboy in a bar and attending a rodeo in John Huston's The Misfits (1961) starring Clark Gable and Marilyn Monroe, which was shot in Nevada

== Political career ==
In 1944, Bell ran for the United States House of Representatives on the Republican ticket against Democrat Berkeley Bunker. The Nevada State Journal commented on November 1: "He has made friends where ever he appeared, but consensus is that the time is too short to overcome a handicap of not being so well known as his opponent". The election was held November 7, and Bell got 19,096 votes while Bunker received 36,648.

Bell was the leader of the Nevada Republican Party and in 1948 was an alternate to the Republican National Convention. He was also active in the Nevada Chamber of Commerce and Boy Scouts.

The ties Bell forged during those years helped him win the Lieutenant Governor's office in 1954. That election year, Charles H. Russell, the incumbent Republican governor, also won. In 1958, Democrat Grant Sawyer unseated Russell, but Bell won re-election as Lieutenant Governor (Bell and his Nevada state political position are mentioned in John D. MacDonald's 1960 novel The Only Girl in the Game). Bell died after giving a campaign speech on July 4, 1962, while running for governor, still in office, of a heart attack at the Thunderbird in Las Vegas.

== Other activities ==
=== Television ===
Bell was host of the program Cowboys and Injuns in 1950. It began on a station in Los Angeles and went on to be broadcast on ABC. The show focused on legends that were derived from folklore of cowboys and Native Americans in the United States.

=== Business ===
Bell operated Rexco Incorporated, which manufactured and distributed novelty gift items. He and his brother also had two clothing stores in Nevada.

== Personal life ==
Bell married actress Clara Bow in 1931. They had two sons, Tony Beldam, who changed his name to Rex Anthony Bell Jr., and George Beldam Jr. Rex Bell Jr. appeared in two Western films—Stage to Thunder Rock (1964), in the role of "Shotgun Rex", and Young Fury (1965), and later served as district attorney of Clark County from 1987 to 1995.

=== Death ===
Bell died of a heart attack on July 4, 1962, a few hours after attending a political rally and picnic in Las Vegas.

The Rex Bell Elementary School in Las Vegas was named in honor of Bell.

== Filmography ==
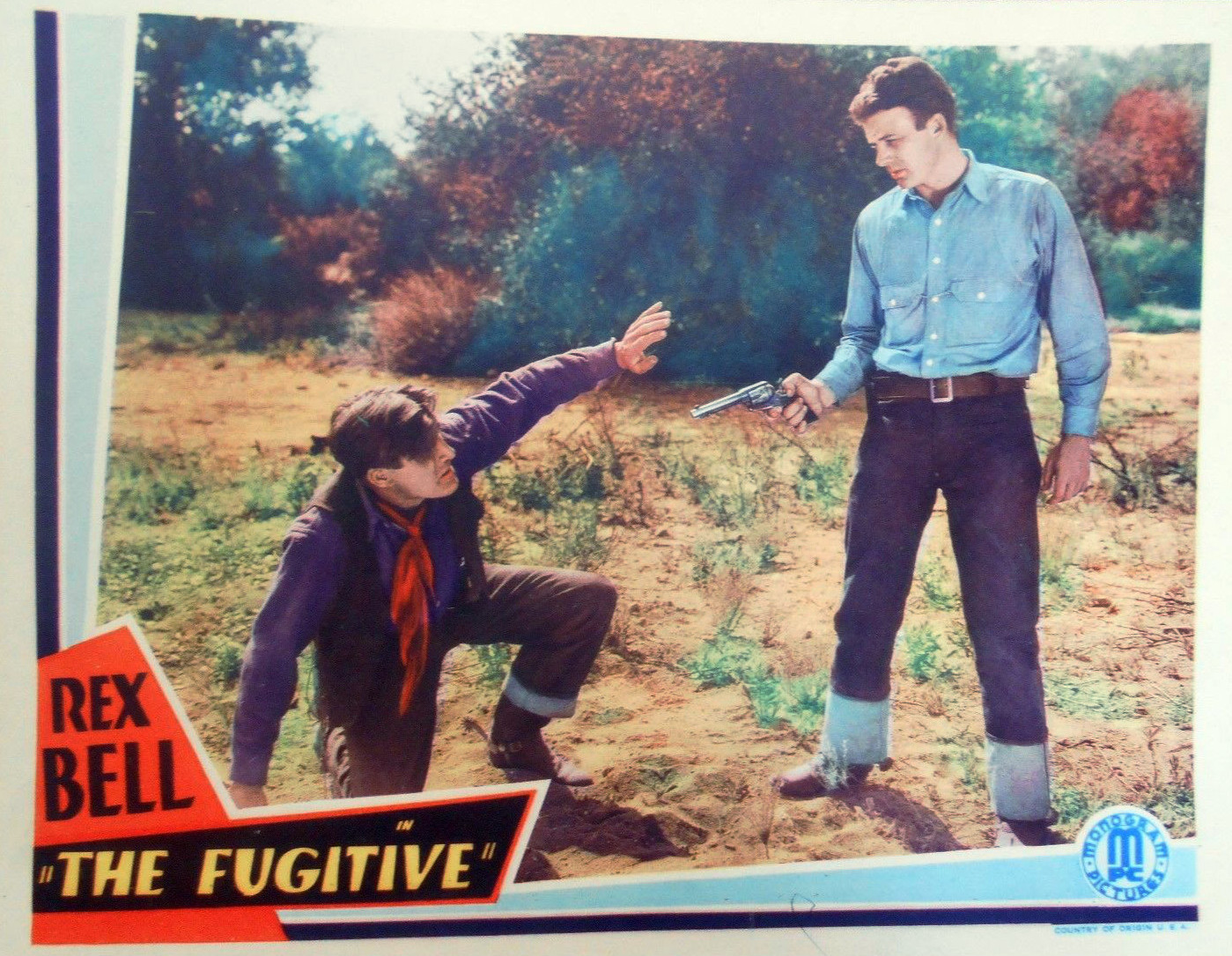
Lobby card with Bell in The Fugitive (1933)

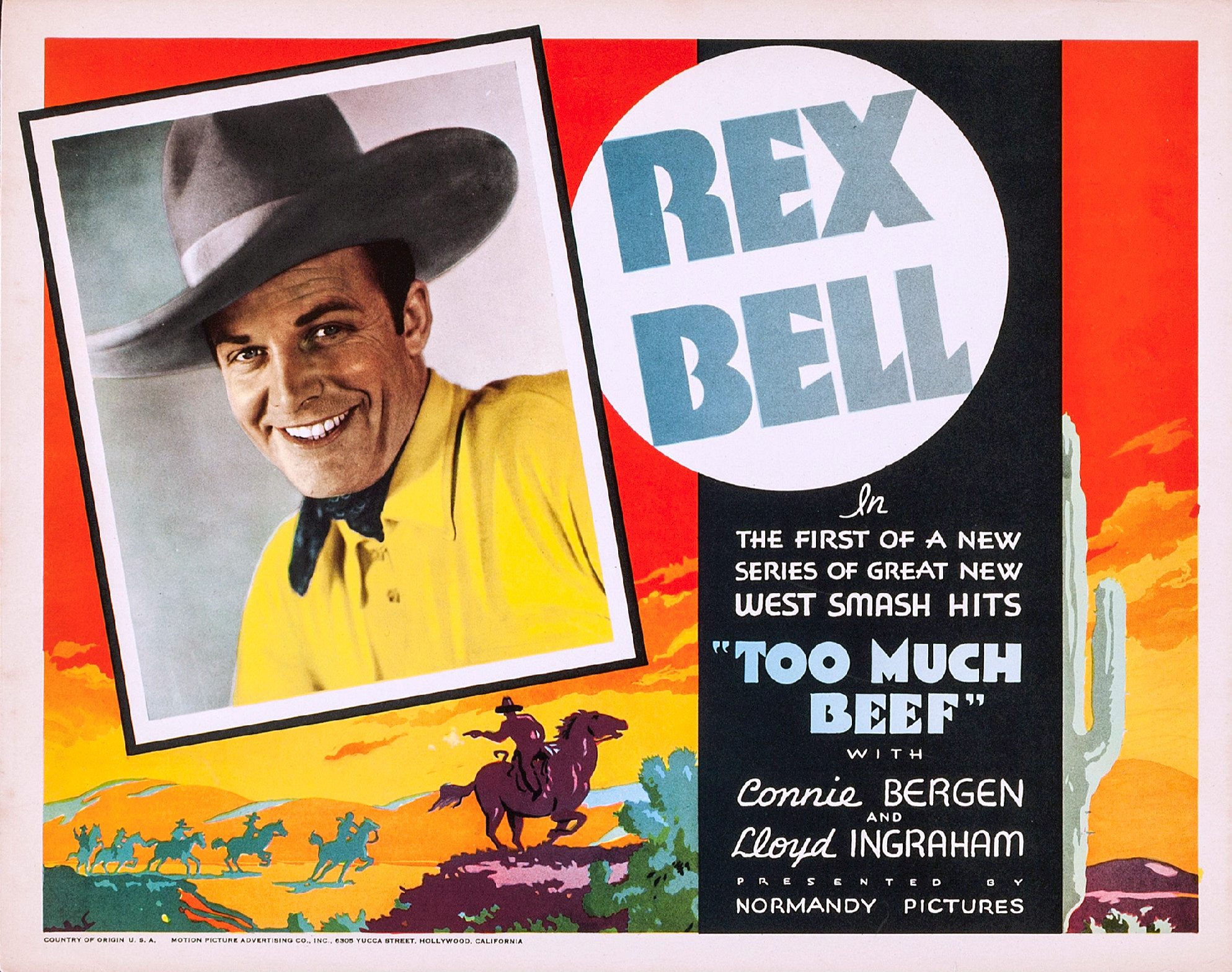
Lobby card with Bell in Too Much Beef, 1936

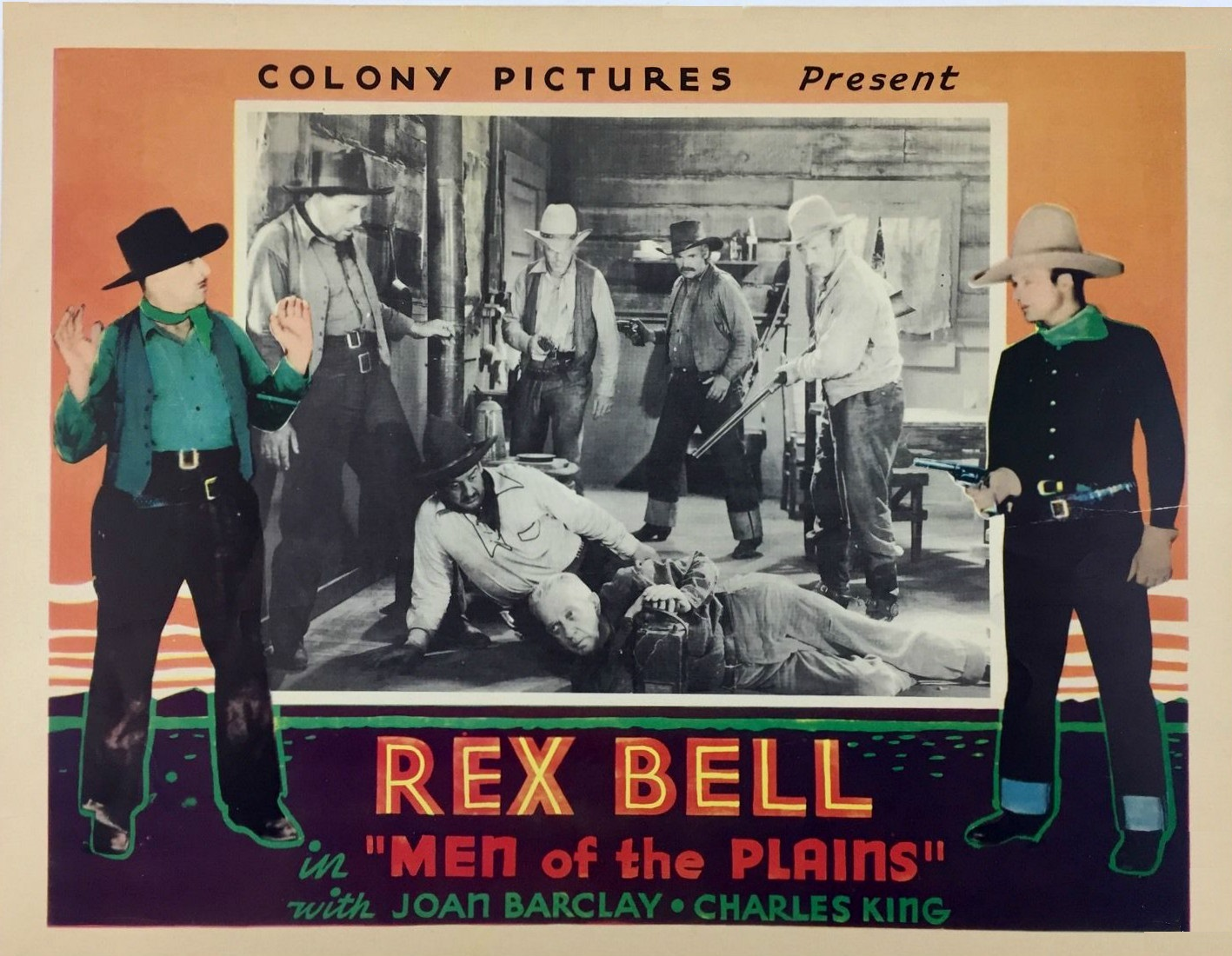
Lobby card with Bell in Men of the Plains (1936)

Year	Title	Role	Notes
1928	Wild West Romance	Phil O'Malley	
1928	The Cowboy Kid	Jim Barrett	
1928	Girl-Shy Cowboy	Joe Benson	
1928	Taking a Chance	Joe Courtney	
1929	Joy Street	Eddie	
1929	Pleasure Crazed	Peters (chauffeur)	
1929	Salute	Cadet	Uncredited
1929	Happy Days	Rex Bell	
1929	They Had to See Paris	Clark McCurdy	
1930	Harmony at Home	Dick Grant	
1930	Courage	Lynn Willard	
1930	True to the Navy	Eddie	
1930	Lightnin'	Larry - Betty's Husband	
1931	Battling with Buffalo Bill	Dave Archer	Serial
1931	Forgotten Women	Jimmy Burke	
1931	Law of the Sea	Cole Andrews	
1932	The Arm of the Law	Robin Dale	
1932	Broadway to Cheyenne	Breezy Kildare	
1932	The Man from Arizona	Kent Rogers	
1932	Lucky Larrigan	Craig Larrigan - posing as Tex aka Lucky	
1932	Crashin' Broadway	Tad Wallace	
1933	Diamond Trail	Speed Morgan - posing as Frisco Eddie	
1933	Fighting Texans	Randy Graves	
1933	The Fugitive	Joe Kean	
1933	Rainbow Ranch	Ed Randall	
1933	Hollywood on Parade No. A-8	Himself	Short
1934	The Tonto Kid	Skeets Slawson aka The Tonto Kid	
1934	Gunfire	Jerry Dunbar	
1935	Fighting Pioneers	Lieutenant Bentley	
1935	Border Vengeance	Announced Rodeo Guest Star	Uncredited
1935	Saddle Aces	Steve Brandt	
1936	Too Much Beef	Johnny Argyle alias Tucson Smith	
1936	West of Nevada	Jim Carden, posing as Jim Lloyd	
1936	Men of the Plains	Jim Dean - aka Tom Porter	
1936	Idaho Kid	Todd Hollister aka Idaho	
1936	Law and Lead	Jimmy Sawyer	
1936	Stormy Trails	Tom Storm	
1942	Tombstone, the Town Too Tough to Die	Virgil Earp	
1942	Dawn on the Great Divide	Jack Carson	
1952	Lone Star	Minor Role	Uncredited
1952	Sky Full of Moon	Himself	Uncredited
1961	The Misfits	Old Cowboy	Uncredited, (final film role)

Political offices
Preceded by Clifford A. Jones	Lieutenant Governor of Nevada; 1955 – 1962	Succeeded by Maude Frazier
