= Cornell Borchers =

German actress (1925–2014)

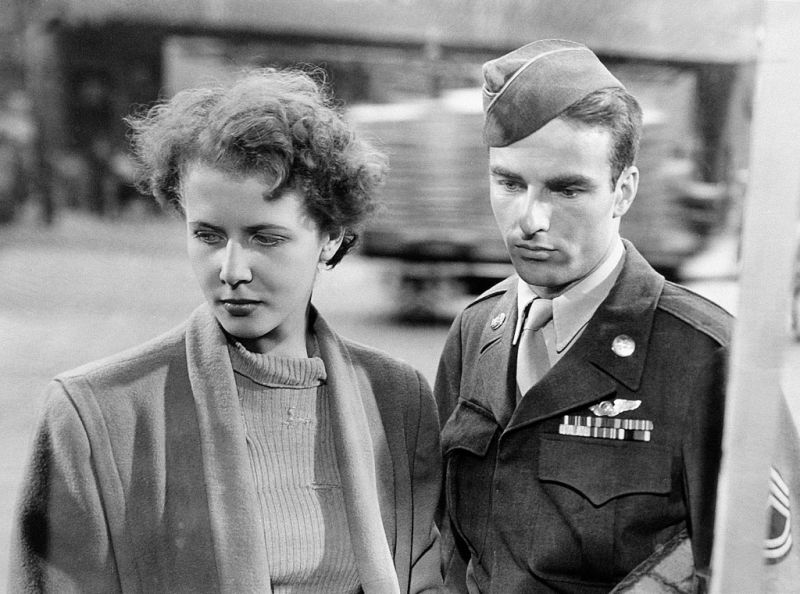
- Cornell Borchers and Montgomery Clift in The Big Lift
- Born: Gerlind Cornelia Borchers; 16 March 1925; Šilutė, Lithuania
- Died: 12 May 2014 (aged 89); Bavaria, Germany
- Occupation: Actress
- Years active: 1949–1959
- Spouses: Bruce Cunningham (19??–19??); Anton Schelkopf (19??–????; divorced)
- Children: Julia Borchers-Schelkopf (b. 1962)

Cornell Borchers (16 March 1925 – 12 May 2014) was a Lithuanian-German actress and singer, active in the late 1940s and 1950s. She is best remembered for her roles opposite Montgomery Clift in The Big Lift (1950) and Errol Flynn and Nat King Cole in Istanbul (1957). She was said to resemble Ingrid Bergman in mid-1950s reviews.

== Biography ==
Borchers was born in Šilutė (German: Heydekrug), Klaipėda Region (German: Memelland), Lithuania in a German either Prussian Lithuanian or Memellander family. She appeared on the cover of East German magazine Neue Filmwelt of 1949, Volume 3, Issue 4. She won a BAFTA Film Award in the category of Best Foreign Actress in 1955 for the movie The Divided Heart (1954). She retired from acting at age 34 to raise her daughter.

She was married twice, first to Bruce Cunningham and then to Dr. Anton Schelkopf, a psychologist, physician and film producer, whom she first met when she starred in his films School for Marriage (1954) and Rot ist die Liebe (1957), by whom she had one daughter, Julia Borchers-Schelkopf, born in Munich, on 15 October 1962. She afterwards lived in Bavaria, Germany and died there in 2014.

== Filmography ==
- Anonymous Letters (1949) as Cornelia
- Martina (1949) as Irene
- Unknown Sender (1950) as Dr. Elisabeth Markert
- 0 Uhr 15 Zimmer 9 (1950) as Maria Mertens
- The Big Lift (1950) as Frederica Burkhardt (also performer: "Vielleicht" and "In einem kleinen Café in Hernals")
- The Lie (1950) as Ellen
- The Deadly Dreams (1951) as Angelika/Inez/Lisette/Maria
- Immortal Light (1951) as Michèle Printemps
- Das Ewige Spiel (1951) as Marie Campenhausen
- Dark Eyes (1951) as Helene Samboni
- Adventure in Vienna (1952) as Karin Manelli
- House of Life (1952) as Dr. Elisabeth Keller
- School for Marriage (1954) as Regine
- Maxie (1954) as Nora
- The Divided Heart (1954) as Inga
- Oasis (1955) as Karine Salstroem
- The Dark Wave (1956) as Herself
- Never Say Goodbye (1956) as Lisa Gosting (also performer: "For the First Time")
- Rot ist die Liebe (1957) as Rosemarie
- Istanbul (1957) as Stephanie Bauer / Karen Fielding
- Flood Tide (1958) as Anne Gordon
- Arzt ohne Gewissen (1959) as Harriet Owen
