= List of American films of 1929 =

American films released in 1929

Hot Stuff starring Alice White.

More than 562 American feature films were released in 1929. The Broadway Melody won the Academy Award for Outstanding Picture at the 2nd Academy Awards, presented on April 3, 1930.

== A–C ==
Title	Director	Cast	Genre	Studio
Acquitted	Frank R. Strayer	Lloyd Hughes, Margaret Livingston	Criminal melodrama	Columbia
After the Fog	Leander De Cordova	Mary Philbin, Edmund Burns, Carmelita Geraghty	Drama	Independent
The Air Legion	Bert Glennon	Antonio Moreno, Ben Lyon	Melodrama	FBO
Alibi	Roland West	Chester Morris, Mae Busch	Crime drama	United Artists
All at Sea	Alfred Goulding	Karl Dane, George K. Arthur	Dramedy	MGM
All Faces West	Raymond K. Johnson	Ben Lyon, Marie Prevost, Anders Randolf	Western	Independent
Applause	Rouben Mamoulian	Helen Morgan, Joan Peers	Musical	Paramount
Anne Against the World	Duke Worne	Shirley Mason, Jack Mower	Drama	Trem Carr Productions
The Argyle Case	Howard Bretherton	Thomas Meighan, H. B. Warner, Lila Lee	Crime	Warner Bros.
The Aviator	Roy Del Ruth	Edward Everett Horton, Patsy Ruth Miller	Crime dramedy	Warner Bros.
The Awful Truth	Marshall Neilan	Ina Claire, Henry Daniell	Comedy	Pathé Exchange/Columbia
The Bachelor Girl	Richard Thorpe	William Collier Jr., Jacqueline Logan	Drama	Columbia
The Bachelor's Club	Noel M. Smith	Richard Talmadge, Barbara Worth, Edna Murphy	Comedy	Independent
Bad Men's Money	J.P. McGowan	Yakima Canutt, Peggy Montgomery, John Lowell	Western	Independent
Barnum Was Right	Del Lord	Glenn Tryon, Merna Kennedy, Otis Harlan	Dramedy	Universal
Behind Closed Doors	Roy William Neill	Virginia Valli, Gaston Glass	Mystery melodrama	Columbia
Behind That Curtain	Irving Cummings	Warner Baxter, Lois Moran	Mystery melodrama	Fox Film
Below the Deadline	J. P. McGowan	Frank Leigh, Barbara Worth	Crime	Chesterfield
Berth Marks	Lewis R. Foster	Stan Laurel, Oliver Hardy, Paulette Goddard	Comedy	MGM
Betrayal	Lewis Milestone	Emil Jannings, Esther Ralston, Gary Cooper	Drama	Paramount
Big Business	James W. Horne, Leo McCarey	Stan Laurel, Oliver Hardy	Comedy	MGM
The Big Diamond Robbery	Eugene Forde	Tom Mix, Kathryn McGuire	Western	FBO
Big Time	Kenneth Hawks	Lee Tracy, Mae Clarke	Drama	Fox Film
Black Hills	Norman Dawn	Katherine Dawn, George Fisher, George Chandler	Drama	Independent
Black Magic	George B. Seitz	Josephine Dunn, Earle Foxe	Drama	Fox Film
The Black Watch	John Ford	Victor McLaglen, Myrna Loy	Adventure/Crime/Drama	Fox Film
Blue Skies	Alfred L. Werker	Freddie Burke Frederick, Ethel Wales	Romantic drama	Fox Film
The Body Punch	Leigh Jason	Jack Dougherty, Virginia Brown Faire	Drama	Universal
Border Romance	Richard Thorpe	Armida, Don Terry, Marjorie Kane	Romantic western	Tiffany
Born to the Saddle	Joseph Levigard	Ted Wells, Duane Thompson	Western	Universal
Bride of the Desert	Duke Worne	Alice Calhoun, LeRoy Mason	Western	Trem Carr Productions
The Bridge of San Luis Rey	Charles Brabin	Lili Damita, Ernest Torrence	Historical	MGM
Broadway	Pál Fejös	Glenn Tryon, Evelyn Brent	Crime melodrama	Universal
Broadway Babies	Mervyn LeRoy	Alice White, Marion Byron	Musical drama	First National
Broadway Fever	Edward F. Cline	Sally O'Neil, Roland Drew, Corliss Palmer	Comedy	Tiffany
The Broadway Hoofer	George Archainbaud	Marie Saxon, Jack Egan	Melodrama	Columbia
The Broadway Melody	Harry Beaumont	Charles King, Anita Page, Bessie Love	Musical comedy	MGM
Broadway Scandals	George Archainbaud	Sally O'Neil, Carmel Myers	Musical	Columbia
Bulldog Drummond	F. Richard Jones	Ronald Colman, Claud Allister, Lawrence Grant, Montagu Love	Melodrama	United Artists
The California Mail	Albert S. Rogell	Ken Maynard, Dorothy Dwan	Drama	First National
Campus Knights	Albert H. Kelley	Raymond McKee, Shirley Palmer	Comedy	Chesterfield
The Canary Murder Case	Malcolm St. Clair	William Powell, Louise Brooks, Jean Arthur	Drama	Paramount
Captain Lash	John G. Blystone	Victor McLaglen, Claire Windsor	Adventure	Fox Film
Careers	John Francis Dillon	Billie Dove, Thelma Todd	Comedy	First National
The Careless Age	John Griffith Wray	Douglas Fairbanks Jr., Carmel Myers	Drama	First National
The Carnival Man	George Abbott	Walter Huston	Drama	Paramount. Short film.
The Case of Lena Smith	Josef von Sternberg	Esther Ralston, James Hall	Drama	Paramount
The Charlatan	George Melford	Holmes Herbert, Margaret Livingston	Melodrama	Universal
Chasing Through Europe	David Butler, Alfred L. Werker	Sue Carol, Nick Stuart	Melodrama	Fox Film
Cheyenne	Albert S. Rogell	Ken Maynard, Gladys McConnell	Western	First National
Children of the Ritz	John Francis Dillon	Dorothy Mackaill, Jack Mulhall	Dramedy	Warner Bros.
Chinatown Nights	William A. Wellman	Wallace Beery, Florence Vidor, Warner Oland	Melodrama	Paramount
Christina	William K. Howard	Janet Gaynor, Charles Morton	Drama	Fox Film
Circumstantial Evidence	Wilfred Noy	Cornelius Keefe, Helen Foster	Melodrama	Chesterfield
Clear the Decks	Joseph Henabery	Reginald Denny, Olive Hasbrouck	Drama	Universal
Close Harmony	John Cromwell, A. Edward Sutherland	Charles "Buddy" Rogers, Nancy Carroll	Musical dramedy	Paramount
The Cocoanuts	Robert Florey, Joseph Santley	Marx Brothers, Mary Eaton	Musical comedy	Paramount
The Cohens and the Kellys in Atlantic City	William James Craft	George Sidney, Vera Gordon	Comedy	Universal
The College Coquette	George Archainbaud	Ruth Taylor, William Collier Jr.	Melodrama	Columbia
College Love	Nat Ross	George J. Lewis, Dorothy Gulliver	Dramedy	Universal
Come Across	Ray Taylor	Lina Basquette, Reed Howes	Crime	Universal
Come and Get It	Wallace Fox	Bob Steele, Marin Sais	Action	FBO
Coquette	Sam Taylor	Mary Pickford, Johnny Mack Brown, Matt Moore	Melodrama	Pickford Corporation
The Cock-Eyed World	Raoul Walsh	Victor McLaglen, Edmund Lowe, Lili Damita	Musical dramedy	Fox Film
Condemned	Wesley Ruggles	Ronald Colman, Ann Harding, Dudley Digges	Drama	United Artists
Courtin' Wildcats	Jerome Storm	Hoot Gibson, Harry Todd	Western	Universal
The Cowboy and the Outlaw	J.P. McGowan	Bob Steele, Edna Aslin, Bud Osborne	Western	Independent
'Neath Western Skies	J. P. McGowan	Tom Tyler, Lotus Thompson, Hank Bell	Western	J.P. McGowan Productions

== D–F ==
Title	Director	Cast	Genre	Notes
Dance Hall	Melville W. Brown	Olive Borden, Arthur Lake	Musical	RKO
The Dance of Life	John Cromwell, A. Edward Sutherland	Hal Skelly, Nancy Carroll, Dorothy Revier	Adventure/Melodrama	Paramount. Technicolor sequences
Dangerous Curves	Lothar Mendes	Clara Bow, Richard Arlen, Kay Francis	Romantic comedy	Paramount
A Dangerous Woman	Rowland V. Lee, Gerald Grove	Olga Baclanova, Clive Brook	Melodrama	Paramount
Dark Skies	Harry S. Webb	Shirley Mason, Wallace MacDonald, Josef Swickard	Drama	Independent
Dark Streets	Frank Lloyd	Jack Mulhall, Lila Lee	Melodrama	First National
Daughters of Desire	Burton L. King	Irene Rich, Richard Tucker	Drama	Independent
The Delightful Rogue	Lynn Shores, Leslie Pearce	Rod La Rocque, Rita La Roy	Romantic melodrama	RKO
Desert Nights	William Nigh	John Gilbert, Ernest Torrence	Melodrama	MGM
The Desert Rider	Nick Grinde	Tim McCoy, Raquel Torres	Western	MGM
The Desert Song	Roy del Ruth	John Boles, Louise Fazenda, Myrna Loy	Musical	Warner Bros.
Devil-May-Care	Sidney Franklin	Ramón Novarro, Dorothy Jordan	Musical	MGM
The Devil's Apple Tree	Elmer Clifton	Dorothy Sebastian, Larry Kent	Melodrama	Tiffany
Disraeli	Alfred E. Green	George Arliss, Joan Bennett	Drama	Warner Bros.
The Divine Lady	Frank Lloyd	Corinne Griffith, Victor Varconi	Historical	First National
The Donovan Affair	Frank Capra	Jack Holt, Dorothy Revier	Mystery dramedy	Columbia
Drag	Frank Lloyd	Richard Barthelmess, Alice Day	Drama	First National
The Drake Case	Edward Laemmle	Gladys Brockwell, Robert Frazer	Thriller	Universal
The Drifter	Robert De Lacey	Tom Mix, Dorothy Dwan	Western	FBO
Dynamite	Cecil B. DeMille	Conrad Nagel, Kay Johnson	Melodrama	MGM
Eternal Love	Ernst Lubitsch	John Barrymore, Camilla Horn	Romance	Feature Productions
The Eternal Woman	John P. McCarthy	Olive Borden, Ralph Graves, Ruth Clifford	Drama	Columbia
Evangeline	Edwin Carewe	Dolores del Río, Roland Drew	Romantic drama	United Artists
Evidence	John G. Adolfi	Pauline Frederick, Conway Tearle	Crime	Warner Bros.
The Exalted Flapper	James Tinling	Sue Carol, Irene Rich	Romantic comedy	Fox Film
Eyes of the Underworld	Leigh Jason	Bill Cody, Sally Blane	Crime	Universal
The Faker	Phil Rosen	Jacqueline Logan, Charles Delaney, Warner Oland	Drama	Columbia
The Fall of Eve	Frank R. Strayer	Patsy Ruth Miller, Ford Sterling	Comedy	Columbia
Fancy Baggage	John G. Adolfi	Audrey Ferris, Myrna Loy	Drama	Warner Bros.
The Far Call	Allan Dwan	Charles Morton, Leila Hyams, Warner Baxter	Melodrama	Fox Film. Lost film
Fashions in Love	Victor Schertzinger	Adolphe Menjou, Fay Compton	Romantic comedy	Paramount
Fast Company	A. Edward Sutherland	Evelyn Brent, Jack Oakie	Sport romantic comedy	Paramount
Fast Life	John Francis Dillon	Douglas Fairbanks Jr., Loretta Young	Melodrama	First National
Flight	Frank Capra	Jack Holt, Lila Lee	Adventure	Columbia
The Flying Fleet	George W. Hill	Ramon Navarro, Ralph Graves, Anita Page	Romantic crime drama	MGM
The Flying Marine	Albert S. Rogell	Ben Lyon, Shirley Mason	Action	Columbia
The Flying Fool	Tay Garnett	William Boyd, Marie Prevost	Melodrama	Pathé Exchange
Footlights and Fools	William A. Seiter	Colleen Moore, Raymond Hackett, Fredric March	Musical comedy	Warner Bros.
The Forward Pass	Edward F. Cline	Douglas Fairbanks Jr., Loretta Young	Drama	First National
The Four Feathers	Merian C. Cooper	Richard Arlen, Fay Wray, Clive Brook	Adventure/Crime/War	Paramount
Fox Movietone Follies of 1929	David Butler	Sue Carol, Dixie Lee	Musical dramedy	Fox Film
From Headquarters	Howard Bretherton	Monte Blue, Gladys Brockwell	Drama	Warner Bros.
Frozen Justice	Allan Dwan	Lenore Ulric, Robert Frazer, Louis Wolheim	Adventure	Fox Film
Frozen River	F. Harmon Weight	Rin Tin Tin, Davey Lee	Melodrama	Warner Bros.
Fugitives	William Beaudine	Madge Bellamy, Don Terry	Drama	Fox Film

== G–I ==
Title	Director	Cast	Genre	Notes
The Gamblers	Michael Curtiz	H. B. Warner, Lois Wilson	Drama	Warner Bros.
The Ghost Talks	Lewis Seiler	Helen Twelvetrees, Charles Eaton	Dramedy	Fox Film
The Girl from Havana	Benjamin Stoloff	Lola Lane, Paul Page	Crime	Fox Film
The Girl from Woolworth's	William Beaudine	Alice White, Gladden James	Romance	First National
The Girl in the Glass Cage	Ralph Dawson	Loretta Young, Carroll Nye	Melodrama/Thriller	First National
The Girl in the Show	Edgar Selwyn	Bessie Love, Raymond Hackett	Comedy	Metro-Goldwyn-Mayer
Girl on the Barge	Edward Sloman	Jean Hersholt, Sally O'Neil	Drama	Universal
Girl Overboard	Wesley Ruggles	Mary Philbin, Fred Mackaye	Romantic drama	Universal
The Girl Who Wouldn't Wait	Leon Abrams	Margaret Livingston, William Scott, Gertrude Short	Drama	Independent
Girls Gone Wild	Lewis Seiler	Sue Carol, Nick Stuart	Melodrama	Fox Film
Glad Rag Doll	Michael Curtiz	Dolores Costello, Ralph Graves	Comedy	Warner Bros.
Glorifying the American Girl	Millard Webb	Mary Eaton, Dan Healy	Musical	Paramount
Gold Diggers of Broadway	Roy Del Ruth	Nancy Welford, Conway Tearle	Musical comedy	Warner Bros.
The Great Divide	Reginald Barker	Dorothy Mackaill, Myrna Loy	Western	First National
The Great Gabbo	James Cruze	Erich von Stroheim, Betty Compson	Musical	Sono Art
The Great Power	Joe Rock	Minna Gombell, Herschel Mayall	Drama	Bristolphone
The Greyhound Limited	Howard Bretherton	Monte Blue, Edna Murphy	Melodrama	Warner Bros.
Grit Wins	Joseph Levigard	Ted Wells, Kathleen Collins	Western	Universal
Gun Law	Robert De Lacey	Tom Tyler, Barney Furey	Western	FBO
Half Marriage	William J. Cowen	Olive Borden, Morgan Farley	Drama	RKO
Hallelujah!	King Vidor	Daniel L. Haynes, Nina Mae McKinney	Drama	MGM
Handcuffed	Duke Worne	Virginia Brown Faire, Dean Jagger	Mystery	Rayart
Happy Days	Benjamin Stoloff	Marjorie White, Stuart Erwin, Janet Gaynor	Musical	Fox Film
Hard to Get	William Beaudine	Dorothy Mackaill, Charles Delaney	Comedy	Warner Bros.
Hardboiled Rose	F. Harmon Weight	Myrna Loy, William Collier Jr.	Drama	Warner Bros.
The Harvest of Hate	Henry MacRae	Jack Perrin, Helen Foster	Western	Universal
Headin' Westward	J.P. McGowan	Bob Custer, Mary Mayberry, John Lowell	Western	Independent
Hearts in Dixie	Paul H. Sloan	Clarence Muse, Stepin Fetchit	Musical dramedy	Fox Film
Hearts in Exile	Michael Curtiz	Dolores Costello, Grant Withers	Romance	Warner Bros.
Her Private Life	Alexander Korda	Billie Dove, Walter Pidgeon	Drama	Warner Bros.
The Heroic Lover	Noel Mason Smith	Leonard St. Leo, Barbara Bedford	Comedy	Richard Talmadge Productions
His Captive Woman	George Fitzmaurice	Milton Sills, Dorothy Mackaill	First National	
His First Command	Gregory La Cava	William Boyd, Dorothy Sebastian	Romantic dramedy	Pathé Exchange. Technicolor sequences
His Glorious Night	Lionel Barrymore	John Gilbert, Catherine Dale Owen	Romance	MGM
His Lucky Day	Edward F. Cline	Reginald Denny, Lorayne Du Val	Comedy	Universal
Hold Your Man	Emmett J. Flynn	Laura La Plante, Eugene Borden	Dramedy	Universal
The Hole in the Wall	Robert Florey	Claudette Colbert, Edward G. Robinson	Mystery melodrama	Paramount
The Hollywood Revue of 1929	Charles Reisner	Conrad Nagel, Jack Benny	Musical	MGM
Honky Tonk	Lloyd Bacon	Sophie Tucker, Lila Lee	Musical	Warner Bros.
Hot for Paris	Raoul Walsh	Victor McLaglen, Fifi D'Orsay	Musical comedy	Fox Film
Hot Stuff	Mervyn LeRoy	Alice White, Louise Fazenda	Comedy	First National
The Hottentot	Roy Del Ruth	Edward Everett Horton, Patsy Ruth Miller	Dramedy	Warner Bros.
House of Horror	Benjamin Christensen	Louise Fazenda, Thelma Todd	Mystery comedy	Warner Bros.
Idaho Red	Robert De Lacey	Tom Tyler, Patricia Caron	Western	FBO
The Idle Rich	William C. deMille	Conrad Nagel, Bessie Love, Leila Hyams	Comedy	Metro-Goldwyn-Mayer
Illusion of Love		John Ho, Florence Lee	Drama	
Innocents of Paris	Richard Wallace	Maurice Chevalier, Sylvia Beecher	Musical comedy	Paramount
In Old Arizona	Irving Cummings	Warner Baxter, Edmund Lowe	Western dramedy	Fox Film
In Old California	Burton L. King	Tom Keene, Helen Ferguson, Henry B. Walthall	Western	Independent
In the Headlines	John G. Adolfi	Grant Withers, Marian Nixon	Drama	Warner Bros.
The Iron Mask	Allan Dwan	Douglas Fairbanks, Belle Bennett	Romantic adventure	United Artists
Is Everybody Happy?	Archie Mayo	Ted Lewis, Alice Day	Musical	Warner Bros.
The Isle of Lost Ships	Irvin Willat	Jason Robards, Virginia Valli	Melodrama/Thriller	First National
It Can Be Done	Fred C. Newmeyer	Glenn Tryon, Sue Carol	Comedy	Universal

== J–L ==
Title	Director	Cast	Genre	Notes
The Jazz Age	Lynn Shores	Douglas Fairbanks Jr., Marceline Day	Melodrama	FBO
Jazz Heaven	Melville W. Brown	Sally O'Neil, Johnny Mack Brown	Dramedy	RKO
Joy Street	Raymond Cannon	Lois Moran, Rex Bell	Melodrama	Fox Film
Just Off Broadway	Frank O'Connor	Donald Keith, Ann Christy	Drama	Chesterfield
The Kid's Clever	William James Craft	Glenn Tryon, Kathryn Crawford	Comedy	Universal
Kid Gloves	Ray Enright	Conrad Nagel, Lois Wilson	Drama	Warner Bros.
King of the Herd	Frank Mattison	Raymond McKee, Nola Luxford	Western	Frank S. Mattison Productions
King of the Rodeo	Henry MacRae	Hoot Gibson, Kathryn Crawford	Western	Universal
The Kiss	Jacques Feyder	Greta Garbo, Conrad Nagel	Romantic drama	MGM
The Lady Lies	Hobart Henley	Walter Huston, Claudette Colbert	Drama	Paramount
Lady of the Pavements	D. W. Griffith	Lupe Vélez, William Boyd	Romantic drama	Art Cinema
The Lariat Kid	B. Reeves Eason	Hoot Gibson, Ann Christy	Western	Universal
The Last of Mrs. Cheyney	Sidney Franklin	Norma Shearer, Basil Rathbone	Dramedy	MGM
The Last Warning	Paul Leni	Laura La Plante, Montagu Love	Mystery	Universal
The Lawless Legion	Harry Joe Brown	Ken Maynard, Nora Lane	Western	First National
Law of the Plains	J. P. McGowan	Tom Tyler, Natalie Joyce	Western	J. P. McGowan Productions
The Letter	Jean de Limur	Jeanne Eagels, Reginald Owen	Drama	Paramount
Little Johnny Jones	Mervyn LeRoy	Alice Day, Edward Buzzell	Sport dramedy	Warner Bros.
The Locked Door	George Fitzmaurice	Rod LaRocque, Barbara Stanwyck, William "Stage" Boyd	Melodrama	Feature Productions
The Lone Wolf's Daughter	Albert S. Rogell	Bert Lytell, Gertrude Olmstead	Melodrama	Columbia
The Long Long Trail	Arthur Rosson	Hoot Gibson, Sally Eilers	Western	Universal
The Lost Zeppelin	Edward Sloman	Conway Tearle, Virginia Valli	Adventure	Tiffany
Love and the Devil	Alexander Korda	Milton Sills, María Corda	Melodrama	First National
Love at First Sight	Edgar Lewis	Norman Foster, Doris Rankin	Musical comedy	Chesterfield
The Love Doctor	Melville W. Brown	Richard Dix, June Collyer	Comedy	Paramount
Love, Live and Laugh	William K. Howard	George Jessel, Lila Lee, John Loder	War drama	Fox Film
The Love Parade	Ernst Lubitsch	Maurice Chevalier, Jeanette MacDonald	Musical	Paramount
The Love Racket	William A. Seiter	Dorothy Mackaill, Sidney Blackmer	Crime drama	First National
The Love Trap	William Wyler	Laura La Plante, Neil Hamilton	Romantic comedy	Universal
Lucky Boy	Norman Taurog	George Jessel, Gwen Lee	Musical dramedy	Tiffany
Lucky in Love	Kenneth Webb	Morton Downey, Betty Lawford, Colin Keith-Johnston	Musical	Pathe Exchange
Lucky Star	Frank Borzage	Janet Gaynor, Charles Farrell	Melodrama	Fox Film

== M–O ==
Title	Director	Cast	Genre	Notes
Madame X	Lionel Barrymore	Ruth Chatterton, Lewis Stone	Drama	MGM
Madonna of Avenue A	Michael Curtiz	Dolores Costello, Grant Withers, Louise Dresser	Melodrama	Warner Bros.
Making the Grade	Alfred E. Green	Lois Moran, Edmund Lowe	Dramedy	Fox Film
The Man I Love	William A. Wellman	Richard Arlen, Mary Brian, Olga Baclanova	Drama	Paramount Famous Lasky
The Man and the Moment	George Fitzmaurice	Billie Dove, Rod La Rocque	Dramedy	First National-Pathé
Man, Woman and Wife	Edward Laemmle	Norman Kerry, Pauline Starke, Marian Nixon	Drama	Universal
Marianne	Robert Z. Leonard	Marion Davies, Lawrence Gray, Cliff Edwards	Drama	Cosmopolitan
Marquis Preferred	Frank Tuttle	Adolphe Menjou, Nora Lane	Comedy	Paramount Famous Lasky
Married in Hollywood	Marcel Silver	J. Harold Murray, Norma Terris	Romantic drama	Fox Film
Masked Emotions	Kenneth Hawks	George O'Brien, Nora Lane	Adventure	Fox Film
Masquerade	Russell Birdwell	Alan Birmingham, Leila Hyams	Melodrama	Fox Film
Melody Lane	Robert F. Hill	Eddie Leonard, Josephine Dunn	Musical melodrama	Universal
Mexicali Rose	Erle C. Kenton	Barbara Stanwyck, Sam Hardy	Romance	Columbia
Midstream	James Flood	Ricardo Cortez, Claire Windsor, Montagu Love	Drama	Tiffany
The Mighty	John Cromwell	George Bancroft, Esther Ralston, Warner Oland	Melodrama	Paramount Famous Lasky
The Million Dollar Collar	D. Ross Lederman	Rin Tin Tin, Evelyn Peirce	Melodrama	Warner Bros.
The Mississippi Gambler	Reginald Barker	Joseph Schildkraut, Joan Bennett	Romance	Universal
Mister Antonio	James Flood	Leo Carrillo, Virginia Valli	Drama	Tiffany
Molly and Me	Albert Ray	Belle Bennett, Joe E. Brown, Alberta Vaughn	Comedy	Tiffany
Modern Love	Arch Heath	Kathryn Crawford, Jean Hersholt	Dramedy	Universal
A Most Immoral Lady	John Griffith Wray	Leatrice Joy, Walter Pidgeon	Drama	Warner Bros.
My Lady's Past	Albert Ray	Belle Bennett, Joe E. Brown, Alma Bennett	Drama	Tiffany
The Mysterious Dr. Fu Manchu	Rowland V. Lee	Warner Oland, Jean Arthur	Drama/Thriller	Paramount Famous Lasky
The Mysterious Island	Lucien Hubbard	Lionel Barrymore, Jacqueline Gadsden	Adventure/Sci-fi	MGM
Navy Blues	Clarence Brown	William Haines, Anita Page	Dramedy	MGM
New Orleans	Reginald Barker	Ricardo Cortez, William Collier Jr., Alma Bennett	Melodrama	Tiffany
New Year's Eve	Henry Lehrman	Mary Astor, Charles Morton	Drama	Fox Film
New York Nights	Lewis Milestone	Norma Talmadge, Gilbert Roland	Crime	United Artists
Night Parade	Malcolm St. Clair	Aileen Pringle, Hugh Trevor, Dorothy Gulliver	Sport melodrama	RKO
Nix on Dames	Donald Gallaher	Mae Clarke, Robert Ames	Dramedy	Fox Film
No Defense	Lloyd Bacon	Monte Blue, May McAvoy	Romance	Warner Bros.
Noisy Neighbors	Charles Reisner	Eddie Quillan, Alberta Vaughn, Jane Keckley	Comedy	Pathe Exchange
Not Quite Decent	Irving Cummings	Louise Dresser, June Collyer	Melodrama	Fox Film
Oh, Yeah!	Tay Garnett	Robert Armstrong, James Gleason, Zasu Pitts	Action	Pathe Exchange
The Oklahoma Kid	J.P. McGowan	Bob Custer, Henry Roquemore	Western	Independent
One Hysterical Night	William James Craft	Reginald Denny, Nora Lane	Romantic comedy	Universal
One Splendid Hour	Cliff Wheeler	Viola Dana, George Periolat, Jack Richardson	Drama	Independent
One Stolen Night	Scott R. Dunlap	Betty Bronson, William Collier	Adventure	Warner Bros.
The One Woman Idea	Berthold Viertel	Rod La Rocque, Marceline Day	Romance	Fox Film
On with the Show!	Alan Crosland	Joe E. Brown, Betty Compson	Musical comedy	Warner Bros.
Our Modern Maidens	Jack Conway	Joan Crawford, Douglas Fairbanks Jr.	Drama	MGM
Outlawed	Eugene Forde	Tom Mix, Sally Blane	Western	FBO
Overland Bound	Leo D. Maloney	Allene Ray, Jack Perrin, Lydia Knott	Western	Rayart

== P–S ==
Title	Director	Cast	Genre	Notes
The Pagan	W. S. Van Dyke	Ramon Novarro, Renee Adoree, Donald Crisp	Romantic melodrama	MGM
The Painted Angel	Millard Webb	Billie Dove, Edmund Lowe	Melodrama	First National
Painted Faces	Albert S. Rogell	Joe E. Brown, Helen Foster, Barton Hepburn	Mystery	Tiffany
Paris	Clarence G. Badger	Irene Bordoni, Jack Buchanan	Musical comedy	First National
Paris Bound	Edward H. Griffith	Ann Harding, Fredric March	Romance	Pathé Exchange
The Peacock Fan	Phil Rosen	Lucien Prival, Dorothy Dwan	Mystery/Thriller	Chesterfield
The Phantom in the House	Phil Rosen	Ricardo Cortez, Nancy Welford	Crime	Trem Carr Productions
Pleasure Crazed	Donald Gallaher, Charles Klein	Marguerite Churchill, Kenneth MacKenna, Dorothy Burgess	Melodrama	Fox Film
Plunging Hoofs	Henry MacRae	Jack Perrin, Barbara Worth	Western	Universal
Pointed Heels	A. Edward Sutherland	William Powell, Fay Wray	Musical dramedy	Paramount Famous Lasky
Points West	Arthur Rosson	Hoot Gibson, Alberta Vaughn	Western	Universal
Port of Dreams	Wesley Ruggles	Mary Philbin, Otis Harlan	Drama	Universal
The Pride of Pawnee	Robert De Lacey	Tom Tyler, Ethlyne Clair	Western	FBO
Prisoners	William A. Seiter	Corinne Griffith, Ian Keith	Drama	Walter Morosco
Protection	Benjamin Stoloff	Dorothy Burgess, Paul Page	Drama	Fox Film
Queen Kelly	Erich von Stroheim	Gloria Swanson, Walter Byron	Romance	United Artists
Queen of the Night Clubs	Bryan Foy	Texas Guinan, Lila Lee	Musical	Warner Bros.
The Quitter	Joseph Henabery	Ben Lyon, Dorothy Revier	Drama	Columbia
The Rainbow	Reginald Barker	Dorothy Sebastian, Lawrence Gray	Western	Tiffany
The Rainbow Man	Fred Newmeyer	Eddie Dowling, Frankie Darro	Musical dramedy	Sono Art
The Redeeming Sin	Howard Bretherton	Dolores Costello, Conrad Nagel	Romance	Warner Bros.
Redskin	Victor Schertzinger	Richard Dix, Jane Novak	Western	Paramount Famous Lasky
Red Hot Rhythm	Leo McCarey	Alan Hale, Kathryn Crawford	Musical comedy	Pathé Exchange
Red Hot Speed	Joseph Henabery	Reginald Denny, Alice Day	Comedy	Universal
The Red Sword	Robert G. Vignola	William Collier Jr., Marian Nixon, Carmel Myers	Drama	FBO
The Rescue	Herbert Brenon	Ronald Colman, Lili Damita	Adventure/Romance	United Artists
The Ridin' Demon	Ray Taylor	Ted Wells, Kathleen Collins	Western	Universal
Rio Rita	Luther Reed	Bebe Daniels, Bert Wheeler, Robert Woolsey	Musical	RKO
The River	Frank Borzage	Charles Farrell, Mary Duncan	Drama	Fox Film
Romance of the Rio Grande	Alfred Santell	Warner Baxter, Mona Maris	Western	Fox Film
The Royal Rider	Harry Joe Brown	Ken Maynard, Olive Hasbrouck	Western	First National
The Sacred Flame	Archie Mayo	Pauline Frederick, Conrad Nagel, Lila Lee	Romance	Warner Bros.
Sally	John Francis Dillon	Marilyn Miller, Alexander Gray	Musical comedy	First National
Salute	John Ford	George O'Brien, Helen Chandler	Sports	Fox Film
The Sap	Archie Mayo	Edward Everett Horton, Alan Hale	Comedy	Warner Bros.
Saturday's Children	Gregory La Cava	Corinne Griffith, Grant Withers	Romantic comedy	Walter Morosco Productions
The Saturday Night Kid	A. Edward Sutherland	Clara Bow, Jean Arthur	Romantic comedy	Paramount Famous Lasky
Say It with Songs	Lloyd Bacon	Al Jolson, Davey Lee	Musical	Warner Bros.
Scandal	Wesley Ruggles	Laura La Plante, John Boles	Drama	Universal
Scarlet Seas	John Francis Dillon	Richard Barthelmess, Betty Compson, Loretta Young	Romantic drama	First National
Señor Americano	Harry Joe Brown	Ken Maynard, Kathryn Crawford	Western	Universal
Seven Faces	Berthold Viertel	Paul Muni, Marguerite Churchill	Romantic drama	Fox Film
Seven Footprints to Satan	Benjamin Christensen	Thelma Todd, Creighton Hale	Drama	First National
The Shakedown	William Wyler	James Murray, Barbara Kent	Melodrama	Universal
Shanghai Lady	John S. Robertson	Mary Nolan, James Murray	Drama	Universal
Shanghai Rose	Scott Pembroke	Irene Rich, William Conklin, Ruth Hiatt	Crime	Rayart
The Shannons of Broadway	Emmett J. Flynn	James Gleason, Lucile Gleason, Mary Philbin	Comedy	Universal
She Goes to War	Henry King	Eleanor Boardman, John Holland	Drama	Inspiration
Show Boat	Harry A. Pollard	Laura La Plante, Joseph Schildkraut	Romance	Universal
The Show of Shows	John G. Adolfi	John Barrymore, Loretta Young, Richard Barthelmess	Musical revue	Warner Bros.
Side Street	Malcolm St. Clair	Owen Moore, Emma Dunn	Crime drama	RKO
Silent Sentinel	Alan James	Gareth Hughes, Josephine Hill	Crime melodrama	Chesterfield
Silks and Saddles	Robert F. Hill	Richard Walling, Marian Nixon	Sports	Universal
The Sin Sister	Charles Klein	Nancy Carroll, Josephine Dunn	Action/Adventure/Drama	Fox Film
Sin Town	J. Gordon Cooper, William K. Howard	Elinor Fair, Ivan Lebedeff	Western	Pathé Exchange
A Single Man	Harry Beaumont	Lew Cody, Marceline Day	Comedy	MGM
The Single Standard	John S. Robertson	Greta Garbo, Nils Asther, Johnny Mack Brown	Romantic drama	MGM
The Skeleton Dance	Walt Disney		Animated short	Walt Disney
Skin Deep	Ray Enright	Monte Blue, Davey Lee, Betty Compson	Drama	Warner Bros.
Skinner Steps Out	William James Craft	Glenn Tryon, Merna Kennedy	Comedy	Universal
The Sky Hawk	John G. Blystone	John Garrick, Helen Chandler	Crime/Romance/War	Fox Film
The Sky Skidder	Bruce Mitchell	Al Wilson, Helen Foster	Action	Universal
Slim Fingers	Joseph Levigard	Bill Cody, Duane Thompson	Mystery	Universal
Smilin' Guns	Henry MacRae	Hoot Gibson, Blanche Mehaffey	Western	Universal
Smiling Irish Eyes	William A. Seiter	Colleen Moore, James Hall	Dramedy	First National
The Smiling Terror	Joseph Levigard	Ted Wells, Derelys Perdue	Western	Universal
Smoke Bellew	Scott R. Dunlap	Conway Tearle, Barbara Bedford	Adventure	Independent
So Long Letty	Lloyd Bacon	Charlotte Greenwood, Claude Gillingwater	Musical comedy	Warner Bros.
Some Mother's Boy	Duke Worne	Mary Carr, Jason Robards Sr., Jobyna Ralston	Drama	Rayart
A Song of Kentucky	Lewis Seiler	Lois Moran, Joseph Wagstaff	Romance	Fox Film
Song of Love	Erle C. Kenton	Belle Baker, Ralph Graves	Musical	Columbia
The Sophomore	Leo McCarey	Eddie Quillan, Sally O'Neil, Jeanette Loff	Comedy	Pathe Exchange
South Sea Rose	Allan Dwan	Lenore Ulric, Charles Bickford	Romantic dramedy	Fox Film
Speakeasy	Benjamin Stoloff	Lola Lane, Paul Page	Sports romantic melodrama	Fox Film
Spite Marriage	Edward Sedgwick, Buster Keaton	Buster Keaton, Dorothy Sebastian	Romantic comedy	MGM. Silent
The Squall	Alexander Korda	Richard Tucker, Alice Joyce	Melodrama	Warner Bros.
Square Shoulders	E. Mason Hopper	Frank Coghlan Jr., Louis Wolheim, Anita Louise	Drama	Pathe Exchange
St. Louis Blues	Dudley Murphy	Bessie Smith	Musical	RKO. Short film
Stark Mad	Lloyd Bacon	H. B. Warner, Louise Fazenda, Jacqueline Logan	Crime	Warner Bros.
Stolen Kisses	Ray Enright	May McAvoy, Hallam Cooley	Comedy	Warner Bros.
Strange Cargo	Arthur Gregor	Lee Patrick, George Barraud	Mystery/Melodrama/Thriller	Pathé Exchange
Street Girl	Wesley Ruggles	Betty Compson, John Harron	Romantic comedy	RKO
Strong Boy	John Ford	Victor McLaglen, Leatrice Joy	Criminal dramedy	Fox Film
Sunny Side Up	David Butler	Janet Gaynor, Marjorie White	Romantic musical dramedy	Fox Film. Technicolor sequences
Syncopation	Bert Glennon	Barbara Bennett, Bobby Watson	RKO	
Synthetic Sin	William A. Seiter	Colleen Moore, Antonio Moreno	Dramedy	Warner Bros.
The Studio Murder Mystery	Frank Tuttle	Neil Hamilton, Doris Hill		

== T–Z ==
Title	Director	Cast	Genre	Notes
The Talk of Hollywood	Mark Sandrich	Nat Carr, Fay Marbe	Musical comedy	Sono Art
The Taming of the Shrew	Sam Taylor	Mary Pickford, Douglas Fairbanks	Comedy	United Artists
Tanned Legs	Marshall Neilan	Arthur Lake, June Clyde, Dorothy Revier	Musical comedy/Melodrama	RKO
They Had to See Paris	Frank Borzage	Will Rogers, Marguerite Churchill, Fifi D'Orsay	Comedy	Fox Film
The Thirteenth Chair	Tod Browning	Conrad Nagel, Leila Hyams	Mystery melodrama	MGM
This Is Heaven	Alfred Santell	Vilma Bánky, James Hall	Romantic dramedy	United Artists
This Thing Called Love	Paul L. Stein	Edmund Lowe, Constance Bennett	Romantic drama	Pathé Exchange
Three Live Ghosts	Thornton Freeland	Joan Bennett, Robert Montgomery, Claud Allister	War comedy	United Artists
The Three Outcasts	Clifford Smith	Yakima Canutt, Pete Morrison, Gertrude Short	Western	Independent
Thru Different Eyes	John G. Blystone	Mary Duncan, Edmund Lowe, Warner Baxter	Melodrama	Fox Film
Thunder	William Nigh	Lon Chaney, Phyllis Haver	Melodrama	MGM
Thunderbolt	Josef von Sternberg	George Bancroft, Fay Wray, Richard Arlen	Melodrama	Paramount Famous Lasky
Tide of Empire	Allan Dwan	Renee Adoree, Tom Keene	Western	MGM
Tiger Rose	George Fitzmaurice	Monte Blue, Lupe Vélez	Adventure	Warner Bros.
The Time, the Place and the Girl	Howard Bretherton	Grant Withers, Betty Compson	Musical dramedy	Warner Bros.
Times Square	Joseph Boyle	Alice Day, Arthur Lubin, Emile Chautard	Drama	Independent
The Tip Off	Leigh Jason	Bill Cody, Duane Thompson	Crime	Universal
Tonight at Twelve	Harry A. Pollard	Madge Bellamy, Robert Ellis	Drama	Universal
Trent's Last Case	Howard Hawks	Raymond Griffith, Marceline Day	Thriller	Fox Film
The Trespasser	Edmund Goulding	Gloria Swanson, Robert Ames	Drama	United Artists
True Heaven	James Tinling	George O'Brien, Lois Moran	War drama	Fox Film
Twin Beds	Alfred Santell	Jack Mulhall, Patsy Ruth Miller	Comedy	First National
Two Men and a Maid	George Archainbaud	William Collier Jr., Alma Bennett	Drama	Tiffany
Two Sisters	Scott Pembroke	Viola Dana, Rex Lease, Claire Du Brey	Action, Adventure, Crime	Trem Carr Productions
Two Weeks Off	William Beaudine	Dorothy Mackaill, Gertrude Astor	Comedy	First National
Under the Southern Cross	Lew Collins	Patiti Warbrick, Witarina Mitchell	Documentary	Universal. Co-production with New Zealand
Unmasked	Edgar Lewis	Robert Warwick, Milton Krims, Sam Ash	Mystery	Independent
Untamed Justice	Harry S. Webb	Virginia Brown Faire, Gaston Glass, David Torrence	Action	Independent
The Vagabond Lover	Neil Marshall	Rudy Vallée, Sally Blane, Marie Dressler	Dramedy	RKO
The Valiant	William K. Howard	Paul Muni, Marguerite Churchill	Melodrama	Fox Film
The Veiled Woman	Emmett J. Flynn	Lia Torá, Walter McGrail	Drama	Fox Film
The Very Idea	Richard Rosson	Frank Craven, Hugh Trevor, Sally Blane	Comedy	RKO
The Virginian	Victor Fleming	Gary Cooper, Walter Huston	Western	Paramount Famous Lasky
The Wagon Master	Harry Joe Brown	Ken Maynard, Edith Roberts	Western	Ken Maynard Productions
Wall Street	Roy William Neill	Ralph Ince, Aileen Pringle	Melodrama	Columbia
Weary River	Frank Lloyd	Richard Barthelmess, Betty Compson	Romantic drama	First National
Wedding Rings	William Beaudine	H. B. Warner, Lois Wilson	Drama	First National
Welcome Danger	Clyde Bruckman, Malcolm St. Clair	Harold Lloyd	Dramedy	Harold Lloyd Corporation. Lloyd's first talkie
When Dreams Come True	Duke Worne	Helene Costello, Rex Lease, Claire McDowell	Drama	Rayart
Where East is East	Tod Browning	Lon Chaney, Lupe Vélez	Melodrama	MGM
Whispering Winds	James Flood	Patsy Ruth Miller, Malcolm McGregor, Eve Southern	Melodrama	Tiffany
The White Outlaw	Robert J. Horner	Art Acord, Bill Patton, Lew Meehan	Western	Independent
Why Be Good?	William A. Seiter	Colleen Moore, Neil Hamilton	Comedy	First National
Why Leave Home?	Raymond Cannon	Sue Carol, Nick Stuart	Musical dramedy	Fox Film
Wild Orchids	Sidney Franklin	Greta Garbo, Lewis Stone, Nils Asther	Romantic drama	MGM
The Winged Horseman	B. Reeves Eason	Hoot Gibson, Ruth Elder	Western	Universal
The Wolf of Wall Street	Rowland V. Lee	George Bancroft, Olga Baclanova, Nancy Carroll	Melodrama	Paramount Famous Lasky
Wolf Song	Victor Fleming	Gary Cooper, Lupe Vélez	Western	Paramount Famous Lasky
Wolves of the City	Leigh Jason	Bill Cody, Sally Blane	Crime	Universal
The Woman from Hell	A. F. Erickson	Mary Astor, Robert Armstrong	Melodrama	Fox Film
The Woman I Love	George Melford	Margaret Morris, Robert Frazer, Leota Lorraine	Drama	FBO
Woman to Woman	Victor Saville	Betty Compson, George Barraud	Romance	Tiffany
Woman Trap	William A. Wellman	Hal Skelly, Chester Morris, Evelyn Brent	Melodrama	Paramount Famous Lasky
Wonder of Women	Clarence Brown	Lewis Stone, Leila Hyams	Drama	MGM
Words and Music	James Tinling	Lois Moran, Helen Twelvetrees	Musical	Fox Film
Wyoming Tornado	J.P. McGowan	Art Acord, Peggy Montgomery, John Lowell	Western	Independent
Young Nowheres	Frank Lloyd	Richard Barthelmess, Marian Nixon	Romantic drama	First National
The Younger Generation	Frank Capra	Jean Hersholt, Lina Basquette, Ricardo Cortez	Drama	Columbia

== See also ==
- 1929 in American television
- 1929 in the United States
