= Texas Pioneers =

1932 film

- Theatrical release poster
- Directed by: Harry L. Fraser
- Screenplay by: Harry L. Fraser
- Produced by: Trem Carr
- Starring: Bill Cody; Andy Shuford; LeRoy Mason; Sheila Bromley; John Elliott; Harry Allen
- Cinematography: Faxon M. Dean
- Edited by: J. Logan Pearson
- Production company: Monogram Pictures
- Distributed by: Monogram Pictures
- Release date: June 18, 1932
- Running time: 58 minutes
- Country: United States
- Language: English

Texas Pioneers is a 1932 American Western film written and directed by Harry L. Fraser. The film stars Bill Cody, Andy Shuford, LeRoy Mason, Sheila Bromley, John Elliott and Harry Allen. The film was released on June 18, 1932, by Monogram Pictures.

== Cast ==
- Bill Cody as Captain Bill Clyde
- Andy Shuford as Andy Thomas
- LeRoy Mason as Mark Collins
- Sheila Bromley as Nancy Thomas
- John Elliott as Colonel Thomas
- Harry Allen as Sergeant McCarey
- Chief Standing Bear as Chief Standing Bear
- Iron Eyes Cody as Little Eagle
- Ann Ross as Indian Girl
