= Under Texas Skies =

Under Texas Skies may refer to:

- Under Texas Skies (1930 film), an American film directed by J.P. McGowan
- Under Texas Skies (1940 film), an American film directed by George Sherman
