= Hap Depew =

American cinematographer

- Born: March 30, 1887; Brushton, New York, United States
- Died: April 11, 1940 (aged 53); Los Angeles, California, United States
- Occupation: Cinematographer
- Years active: 1921-1936 (film)

Hap Depew (1887–1940) was an American cinematographer. He shot silent films for Trem Carr at Rayart Pictures during the 1920s. During the 1930s, he worked on several Our Gang short films.

== Selected filmography ==
- Cold Steel (1921)
- Stormy Seas (1923)
- Million Dollar Mystery (1927)
- Gun-Hand Garrison (1927)
- Modern Daughters (1927)
- Duty's Reward (1927)
- On the Stroke of Twelve (1927)
- The Branded Man (1928)
- The Black Pearl (1928)
- The Law and the Man (1928)
- The Devil's Tower (1928)
- Lightnin' Shot (1928)
- The Divine Sinner (1928)
- Ships of the Night (1928)
- A Gentleman Preferred (1928)
- Sisters of Eve (1928)
- Mystery Valley (1928)
- Gypsy of the North (1928)
- Isle of Lost Men (1928)
- The Man from Headquarters (1928)
- Should a Girl Marry? (1928)
- Silent Trail (1928)
- West of Santa Fe (1928)
- The Cowboy and the Outlaw (1929)
- Two Sisters (1929)
- The Devil's Chaplain (1929)
- Bride of the Desert (1929)
- Handcuffed (1929)
- The Man from Nevada (1929)
- Shanghai Rose (1929)
- When Dreams Come True (1929)
- Some Mother's Boy (1929)
- The Oklahoma Kid (1929)
- Breezy Bill (1930)
- Call of the Desert (1930)
- The Canyon of Missing Men (1930)
- Oklahoma Cyclone (1930)
- Near the Rainbow's End (1930)
- The Devil's Brother (1933)

== Bibliography ==
- Scott Allen Nollen. Boris Karloff: A Critical Account of His Screen, Stage, Radio, Television, and Recording Work. McFarland, 1991.
- Charles Stumpf. ZaSu Pitts: The Life and Career. McFarland, 2010.
