= The Diamond Master =

1929 film

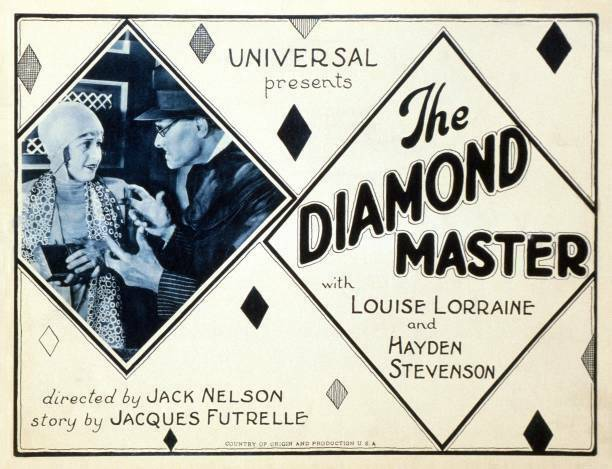
- Directed by: Jack Nelson
- Written by: Jacques Futrelle
- Starring: Hayden Stevenson; Louise Lorraine
- Distributed by: Universal Pictures
- Release date: February 3, 1929
- Running time: 10 episodes
- Country: United States
- Language: Silent with English intertitles

The Diamond Master is a 1929 film serial directed by Jack Nelson. The film is considered to be lost. It is based on a story by Jacques Futrelle who was one of the 1,500 victims in the Titanic disaster in 1912. The story was filmed earlier as a silent movie called ''The Diamond Queen'' in 1921.

== Cast ==
- Hayden Stevenson as Mark Van Cortland Wynne
- Louise Lorraine as Doris Killner
- Al Hart as Randolph Latham
- Monte Montague as Van's Manservant
- Louis Stern as John Killner
- Walter Maly

== Chapter titles ==
1. The Secret of the Night
2. The Diamond of Death
3. The Tunnel of Terror
4. Trapped
5. The Diamond Machine
6. The Wolf Pack
7. The Death Trap
8. Into the Flames
9. The Last Stand
10. The Reckoning

== See also ==
- List of American films of 1929
- List of film serials
- List of film serials by studio
