= William Lord Wright =

American film producer

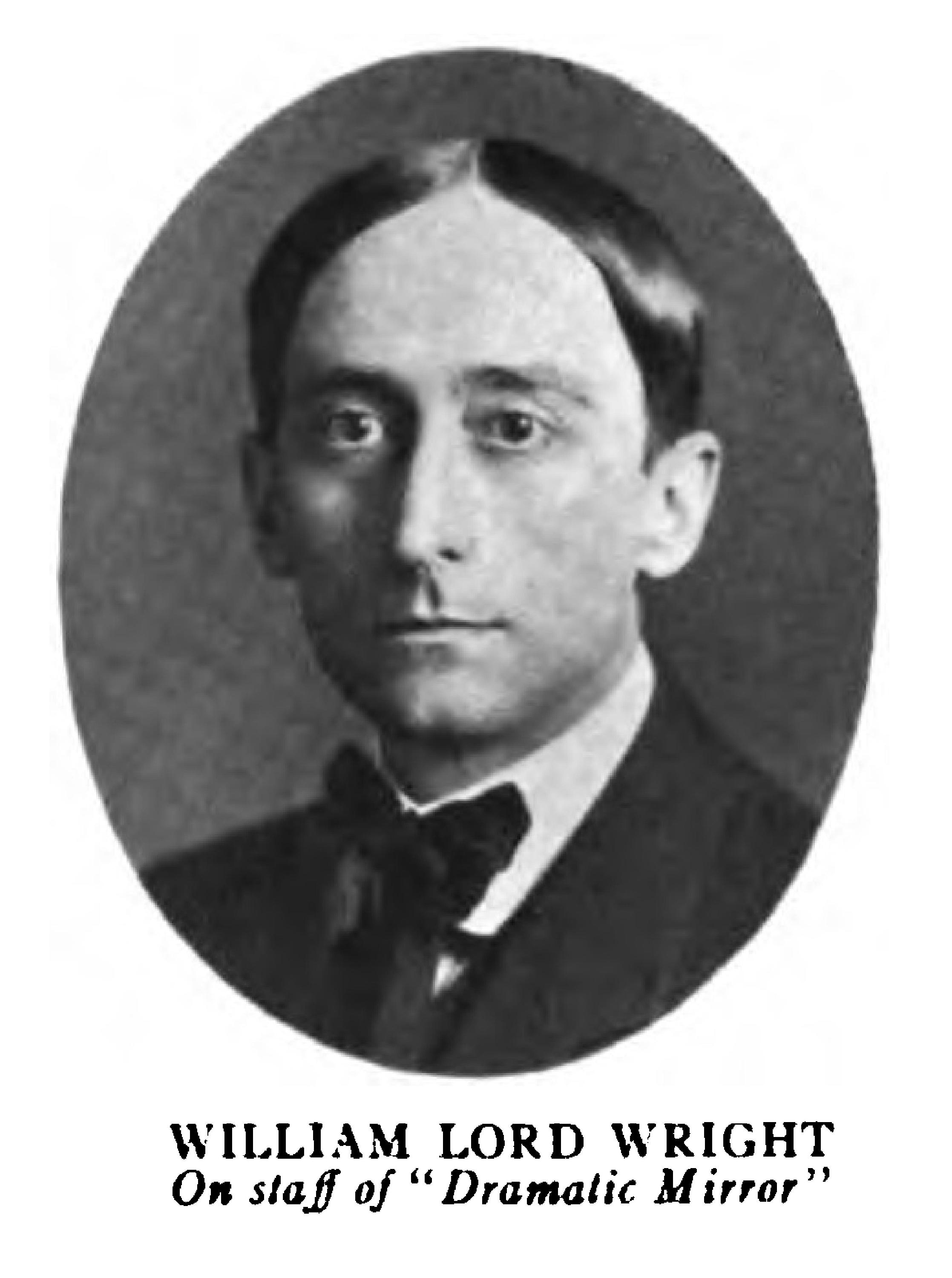
- Wright in 1914
- Born: November 14, 1879; Bellefontaine, Ohio, U.S.
- Died: April 21, 1947 (aged 67); Hollywood, California, U.S.
- Resting place: Hollywood Forever Cemetery
- Occupations: Screenwriter, film producer
- Spouse: Sarah Wright

William Lord Wright (November 14, 1879 Bellefontaine, Ohio – April 21, 1947 Hollywood, California) was an American screenwriter and film producer.

Wright was a newspaper reporter in his hometown of Bellefontaine, Ohio, before going to Hollywood in 1917 where he wrote film scripts for Selig Studios for many years. He then went to work for Pathé Exchange as chief story editor. Later he went to work for Universal Studios as head of the scenario department.

He wrote the book Photoplay Writing (1922), published by Falk Publishing Co., New York which was used by the New York Institute of Photography.

Wright died in Hollywood, California, on April 21, 1947. He was survived by Sarah Wright of 1741½ N. Van Ness Avenue, Hollywood, California. He was buried at Hollywood Park Cemetery on April 24, 1947.

== Filmography ==
Writer

- 'Twixt Loyalty and Love (1910)
- The Landing of the Hose Reel (1915) (short) scenario
- The Run on Percy (1915) (short)
- Ace of Spades (1925) (15 episodes)
- The Great Circus Mystery (1925)
- Perils of the Wild (1925)
- Fighting with Buffalo Bill (1926) (serial)
- Blake of Scotland Yard
- The Vanishing Rider (1928) (serial)
- Plunging Hoofs (1929)
- Hoofbeats of Vengeance (1929)
- The Harvest of Hate (1929)

Producer

- The White Horseman (1921) (serial)
- The Price of Fear (1928) Supervisor
- The Border Wildcat (1929) Supervisor
- Grit Wins (1929) Supervisor
- The Ridin' Demon (1929) Supervisor
- The Smiling Terror (1929) Supervisor
- Tarzan the Tiger (1929) (serial) Supervisor
- The Tip Off (1929)
- Wolves of the City (1929) Supervisor
- The Indians Are Coming (1930) (serial) Supervisor
