= Eyes of the Underworld =

Eyes of the Underworld may refer to:

- Eyes of the Underworld (1942 film), an American film noir crime film
- Eyes of the Underworld (1929 film), an American crime film
