= The Montana Kid =

1931 film

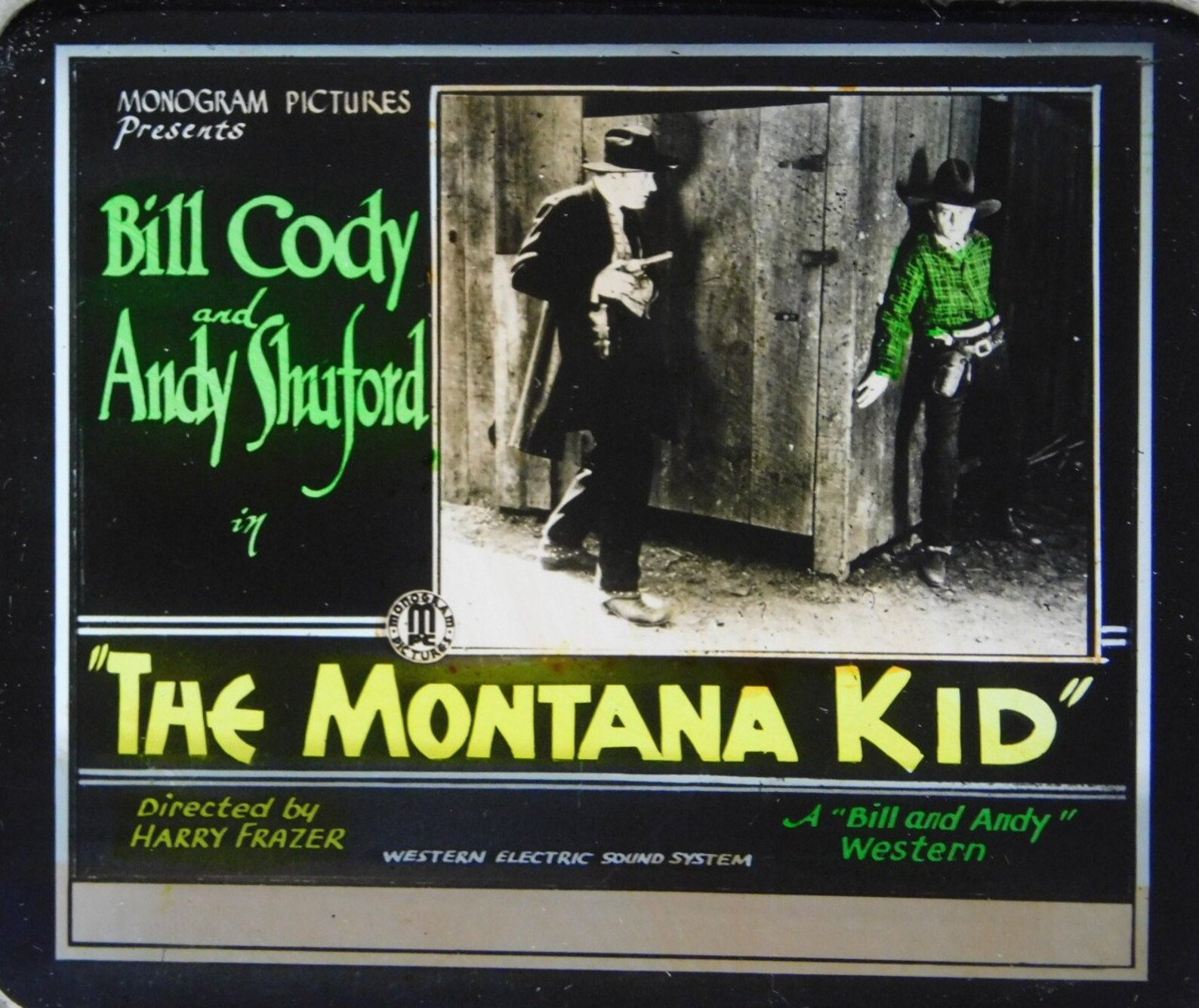
- Lantern slide
- Directed by: Harry L. Fraser
- Written by: Harry L. Fraser (story); George Arthur Durlam (screenplay)
- Produced by: Trem Carr
- Starring: See below
- Cinematography: Archie Stout
- Edited by: Leonard Wheeler
- Production company: Trem Carr Pictures
- Distributed by: Monogram Pictures
- Release date: August 10, 1931
- Running time: 60 minutes
- Country: United States
- Language: English

The Montana Kid is a 1931 pre-Code American Western film directed by Harry L. Fraser starring the team of Bill Cody and Andy Shuford.

== Plot ==
Minutes before he is to meet his young son Andy, the drunken Mr. Burke is cheated in gambling and is tricked into signing his ranch over when he thinks he is signing an I.O.U to saloon gambler Chuck Larson. Larson goads Burke into a fight where he kills him. Burke's friend Bill Denton takes custody of Andy, and when the two are evicted of their property Bill vows a just revenge.

== Cast ==
- Bill Cody as Bill Denton
- Andy Shuford as Andy Burke
- Doris Hill as Molly Moore
- William L. Thorne as Chuck Larson
- John Elliott as Burke
- Gordon De Main as Marshal Jack Moore
- Paul Panzer as Henchman Gabby

== See also ==
- Gunless
