= The Galloping Cowboy =

1926 film

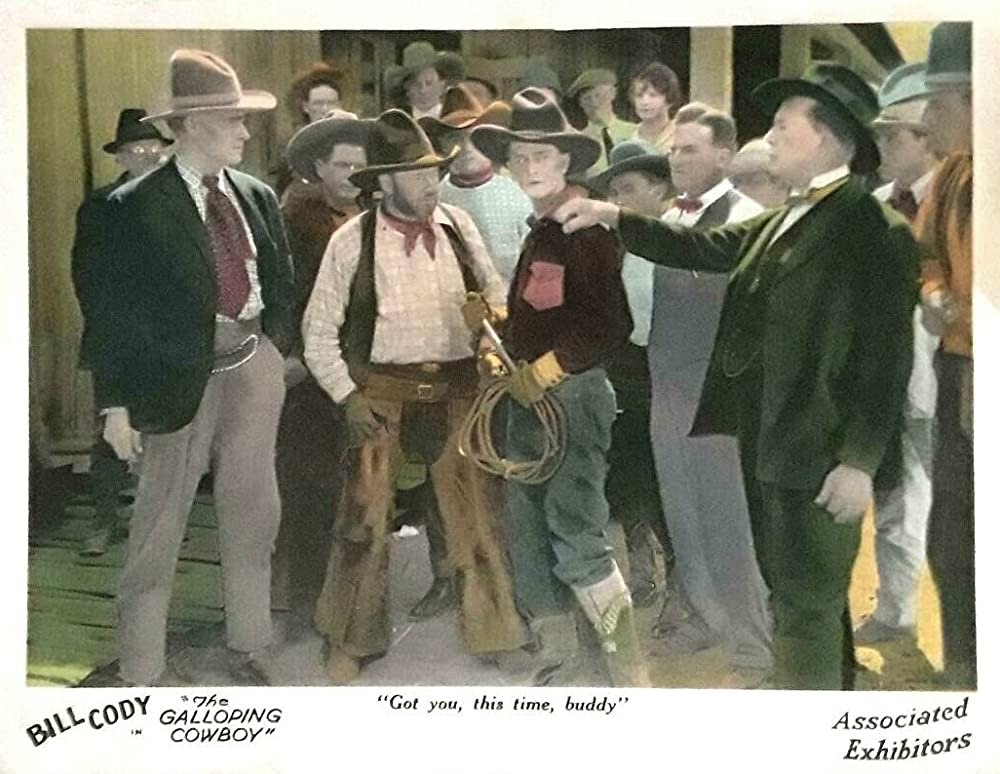
- Directed by: William James Craft
- Written by: Adele Buffington
- Produced by: Pat Powers
- Starring: Bill Cody; Edmund Cobb
- Production company: Western Star Productions
- Distributed by: Associated Exhibitors
- Release date: May 16, 1926
- Running time: 50 minutes
- Country: United States
- Languages: Silent; English intertitles

The Galloping Cowboy is a 1926 American silent Western film directed by William James Craft and starring Bill Cody and Edmund Cobb.

== Cast ==
- Bill Cody as Bill Crane
- Alex Hart as Pete Perry (Bill's Uncle)
- Edmund Cobb as Jack Perry
- Barney Gilmore as Prof. Pinkleby
- Florence Ulrich as Mary Pinkleby
- Richard Cummings as Sheriff
- David Dunbar as Pedro
- Janet Gaynor as Extra

== Preservation ==
With no holdings located in archives, The Galloping Cowboy is considered a lost film.

== Bibliography ==
- Darby, William. Masters of Lens and Light: A Checklist of Major Cinematographers and Their Feature Films. Scarecrow Press, 1991.
