= Law of the North =

1932 film

- Directed by: Harry L. Fraser
- Written by: Harry L. Fraser
- Produced by: Trem Carr
- Starring: Bill Cody; Andy Shuford; Nadine Dore
- Cinematography: Wilfrid M. Cline; Archie Stout
- Edited by: J. Logan Pearson
- Production company: Trem Carr Pictures
- Distributed by: Monogram Pictures
- Release date: May 30, 1932
- Running time: 55 minutes
- Country: United States
- Language: English

Law of the North is a 1932 American Western film directed by Harry L. Fraser and starring Bill Cody, Andy Shuford and Nadine Dore. It was the penultimate Monogram Pictures eight-film Western film series "the Bill and Andy series", with Bill Cody co-starring with child actor Andy Shuford.

== Plot ==
Bill Roberts is presumed to have murdered a man when he is found near the body and flees from his pursuers. He surrenders but finds that Judge Hanley is very keen to have him hung as soon as possible. The body of the supposedly murdered man vanishes with the judge finding himself pursued by the "Law of the North".

== Cast ==
- Bill Cody as Bill Roberts
- Andy Shuford as Andy
- Nadine Dore as Laura
- William L. Thorne as Judge Hanley
- Al St. John as Jailbird
- Heinie Conklin as Jailbird
- Gilbert Pratt as Sheriff
- Jack Carlyle as Jack

== Bibliography ==
- Pitts, Michael R. Western Movies: A Guide to 5,105 Feature Films. McFarland, 2012.
