= The Border Menace =

- Directed by: Jack Nelson
- Written by: Robert J. Horner
- Produced by: Robert J. Horner; Nathan Hirsh
- Starring: Bill Cody; George Chesebro; Jimmy Aubrey
- Cinematography: Frank Bender
- Edited by: Jimmy Aubrey
- Production company: Aywon Film Corporation
- Release date: April 1, 1934
- Running time: 53 minutes
- Country: United States
- Language: English

The Border Menace is a 1934 American Western film directed by Jack Nelson and starring Bill Cody, Miriam Rice, George Chesebro and Jimmy Aubrey who also edited the film. It was produced by an independent Poverty Row outfit Aywon Film Corporation for release as a second feature. Location shooting took place at the Walker Ranch in Newhall, California.

== Plot ==
A Ranger goes undercover as a cattle rustler, but the man he was in prison with to get his information breaks out and vows vengeance.

== Cast ==
- Bill Cody as Ranger Bill "The Shadow" Williams
- Miriam Rice as Helen Millette
- George Chesebro as Chuck Adams
- Jimmy Aubrey as Polecat Pete
- Ben Corbett as Dragon Morris
- Frank Clark as Banker Harris
- James Donnelly as Old Man Millette

== Bibliography ==
- Pitts, Michael R. Poverty Row Studios, 1929–1940. McFarland & Company, 2005.
