= The Body Punch =

1929 film

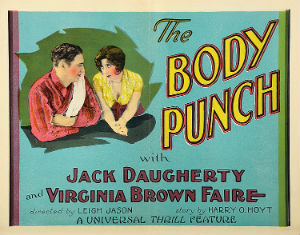
- Lobby card
- Directed by: Leigh Jason
- Screenplay by: Harry O. Hoyt; Clarence Marks; Gardner Bradford
- Story by: Harry O. Hoyt
- Starring: Jack Dougherty; Virginia Brown Faire; George Kotsonaros; Wilbur Mack; Monte Montague; Arthur Millett
- Cinematography: Joseph Brotherton
- Edited by: Frank Atkinson
- Production company: Universal Pictures
- Distributed by: Universal Pictures
- Release date: July 14, 1929
- Running time: 55 minutes
- Country: United States
- Language: Silent (English intertitles)

The Body Punch is a 1929 American silent comedy film directed by Leigh Jason and written by Harry O. Hoyt, Clarence Marks, and Gardner Bradford. The film stars Jack Dougherty, Virginia Brown Faire, George Kotsonaros, Wilbur Mack, Monte Montague, and Arthur Millett. The film was released on July 14, 1929, by Universal Pictures.

== Cast ==
- Jack Dougherty as Jack Townsend
- Virginia Brown Faire as Natalie Sutherland
- George Kotsonaros as Paul Steinert
- Wilbur Mack as Peyson Turner
- Monte Montague as Manager
- Arthur Millett as Detective

== Preservation ==
With no prints of The Body Punch located in any film archives, it is a lost film.
