= Sam Polo =

American actor

- Born: 7 November 1872; California, U.S.
- Died: 3 October 1966 (aged 93); Woodland Hills, Los Angeles, California, U.S.
- Resting place: Inglewood Park Cemetery
- Occupation(s): Make up artist, Actor
- Years active: 1910s-1950s

Sam Polo (November 7, 1872 – October 3, 1966) was an American make up artist and actor of the silent movies era known for The Lion's Claws (1918), The Great Circus Mystery (1925) and A Man from Nowhere (1920). He was the brother of Eddie Polo.

He died in Woodland Hills, Los Angeles, California, and is buried at Inglewood Park Cemetery, Los Angeles, California.

== Partial filmography ==
- The Lion's Claws (1918)
- The Midnight Man (1919)
- A Man from Nowhere (1920)
- The Bearcat (1922)
- The Great Circus Mystery (1925)
- The Fighting Ranger (1925)
