= Bill Cody (actor) =

American actor

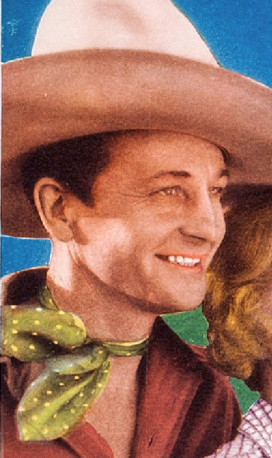
- Cody in Frontier Days (1934)
- Born: William Joseph Cody, Sr. January 5, 1891; St. Paul, Minnesota, U.S.
- Died: January 24, 1948 (aged 57); Santa Monica, California, U.S.
- Occupation: Film actor

Páll Valtýr Pálsson (January 5, 1891 – January 24, 1948), better known as Bill Cody Sr., was a Hollywood B-Western actor of the 1920s, 1930s, and 1940s, and father to Bill Cody Jr.

Cody began his acting career in the early days of film and just happened to have the same name as "Buffalo" Bill Cody, although he was not a relation. Cody's name was what initially drew producers to him; however, he soon proved to be a charismatic performer in his own right.

== Biography ==
Born to Icelandic parents, in Winnipeg, Canada, the son of Páll Valtýr Eiríksson from Víðvíkurströnd and Björg Jónsdóttir from Reykjarströnd, Cody was said to have attended Saint Thomas Military Academy, and later St. Johns University. Immediately out of college, he joined the Metropolitan Stock Company, touring the U.S. and Canada. This eventually led him to Hollywood. In 1922, he began working as a stuntman.

== Acting Career in Silent Films ==
Jesse Goldburg, liking Cody, signed him to an eight series film deal for the 1924–25 season. Golburg's company, Independent Pictures, although known for being made for as little money as possible, had gained a good reputation for having good casting and locations for their films. The first of the series starring Cody was Dangerous Days, directed by J.P. McGowan. That was followed by The Fighting Sheriff, with the rest of the series out over the next six months.

Following the Independent Pictures series, Cody starred in two films for Associated Exhibitors, The Galloping Cowboy and King of the Saddle, both released in 1926. That same year he starred in Arizona Whirlwind released through Pathé. In 1927 he starred in Born to Battle, which gave him an opportunity to exhibit his horse riding skills and to use a bull whip on screen, and two more Bill Cody Productions boasting stories supposedly concocted by Cody himself: Gold from Weepah and Laddie Be Good. Agile and pleasant in appearance, Cody ended his silent film career by starring in a group of action pictures released by Universal which temporarily removed him from the western milieu: The Price of Fear, Wolves of the City, The Tip Off, Slim Fingers and Eyes of the Underworld.

His first talking feature was Under Texas Skies, starring Bob Custer, in 1930. Many former silent film stars failed to be accepted by the public with the advent of sound pictures, and many could not make a successful transition. However, Cody's pace never lessened, and he was in demand immediately following his first "talky", despite his well-known difficulty with the memorization of dialogue.

== Monogram Pictures ==
Monogram Pictures signed Cody to an eight-film Western series, co-starring with child actor Andy Shuford, which was called "the Bill and Andy series". The first Monogram Cody film to be released was Dugan of the Badlands, directed by Robert Bradbury. Harry Fraser replaced Bradbury as director of The Montana Kid, Oklahoma Jim (a somber story in which Cody, as a gambler, becomes involved in an Indian uprising), Mason of the Mounted (featuring Cody as a Mountie and Shuford as a runaway youngster), the atmospheric Ghost City, Land of Wanted Men, Law of the North and Texas Pioneers. The films were well-received, but Monogram opted not to continue the series.

Cody did not film anything in 1933, instead working for a traveling Wild West show as its star attraction. He returned in 1934, starring in The Border Menace, an extremely low-budgeted film released by Aywon Pictures, which received terrible reviews. Aywon followed that with Border Guns and Western Racketeers, which did somewhat better. Cody then worked for a time in the Downie Bros. Circus, replacing Jack Hoxie as the star attraction.

== Ray Kirkwood Productions ==
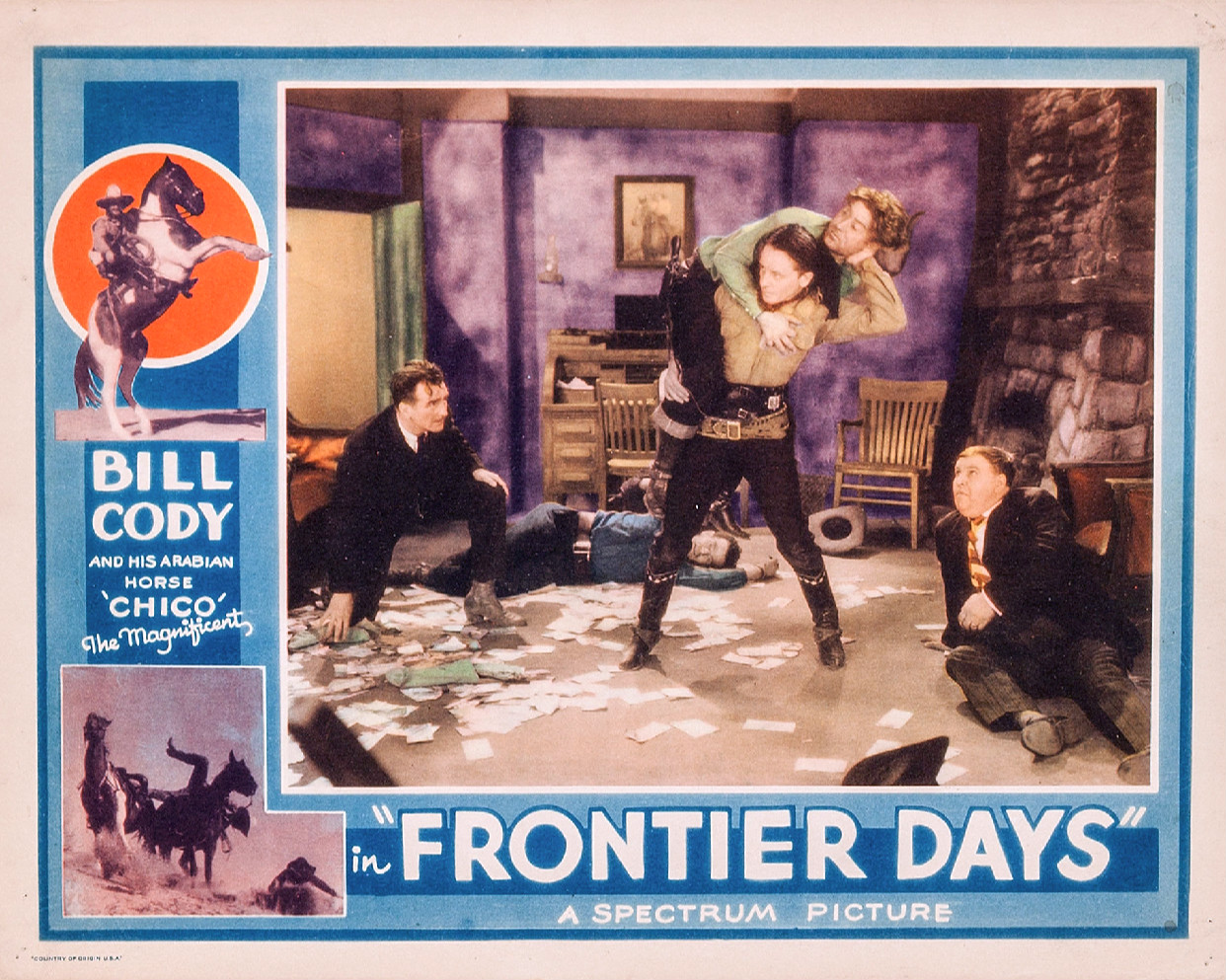
Frontier Days lobby card

Late in 1934, producer Ray Kirkwood signed Cody to a contract, to make a series of cowboy thrillers for release through Spectrum Pictures. Kirkwood, a native of Pennsylvania who had once been a production manager for Thomas Ince and later a film distributor in South America, turned producer with the release of Frontier Days, a lively and entertaining feature which opened to exceptionally good reviews. Cody and his pinto, Chico, were joined by leading lady Ada Ince, silent film veterans Franklyn Farnum and William Desmond, one-time leading man Wheeler Oakman, and Cody's 9-year-old son, billed simply as Billy, Jr.

As the first father-and-son team starring together in B-Westerns, both Cody Sr. and Billy showed considerable promise in the first film of the series. It was followed by Six Gun Justice, The Cyclone Ranger (a tale of mistaken identity from the pen of prolific western writer Oliver Drake), The Texas Rambler (another Oliver Drake screenplay, this one with a strong element of mystery), and The Vanishing Riders (in which Cody and his son masquerade as ghosts to demoralize a gang of despicable, superstitious rustlers).

The Codys went on tour with a wild west show and circus. When they returned to Hollywood, Kirkwood – experiencing a financial squeeze – replaced writer Drake with his own wife, Zarah Tazil, who wrote the remaining screenplays for the series. Director J. P. McCarthy succeeded in getting from Cody one of his best performances in The Lawless Border, featuring Molly O'Day as leading lady. Blazing Justice and Outlaws of the Range concluded the Spectrum series on a pleasant but less ambitious note.

Cody was the star attraction with the Downie Brothers Circus when it opened its 1935 season in Macon, Georgia, to a capacity house. "With all equipment resplendent in new red paint the show opened with the Cavalcade of Splendor. Bill Cody was then introduced by Harry Mack," Downie's press agent. Cody was replacing Jack Hoxie, who had headlined the 1933–34 season.

In May 1935, Billboard reported that Cody and "the new seal act were going over big." In August, two of Cody's sons joined him from their school vacations, and one report said that Cody was at work on a circus film, which was to be one of eight he made for Spectrum Pictures. The September 28, 1935, Billboard reported that Cody "closed several weeks ago" but does not give a date or reason for his leaving.

Prior to joining Downie, Cody was a feature on the Miller Brothers' 101 Ranch show in 1929 and the Bostock Wild Animal Circus in 1934, the year he starred in The Border Menace, called by some "the worst B-Western ever made."

== The Reckless Buckaroo ==
Ray Kirkwood's widow recalled in later years that Kirkwood was very fond of Cody. He planned another series of eight features, co-starring Cody Sr. and Cody Jr. for the 1936–37 season, and this was announced in the trade papers. With finances strained, the first film – scripted by Tazil and titled The Reckless Buckaroo — went into production. During production, Kirkwood's backer, Monarch Laboratories, removed him as producer and ordered him to leave the set, placing director Harry Fraser in charge. By March 1, 1936, Fraser had finished the picture, but Kirkwood was unable to secure financing for any additional films in the proposed series. The Cody series concluded abruptly, and Kirkwood left Hollywood. Released in 1937 by Crescent Pictures, this proved to be Cody's final starring role.

== Later years ==
Cody's career slowed for a time, and his roles became less, but he still had success throughout his lifetime. Oliver Drake wrote the part of "Sheriff Warren" for him in the RKO film The Fighting Gringo, starring George O'Brien in 1939, and that same year he played a small role in what has been called John Wayne's breakout role, Stagecoach, directed by the legendary John Ford. He is said to have had bit roles in two cliffhangers, G-Men vs the Black Dragon and The Masked Marvel, both in 1943, and in Joan of Arc, released in 1948.

Cody died at age 57 in 1948, at St. Joseph's Hospital in Santa Monica, California. A funeral mass was celebrated at Blessed Sacrament Church in Hollywood, and Cody was survived by his wife, Victoria Regina, and his sons, Bill Jr. and Henry.

== Partial filmography ==
- Blood and Steel (1925)
- Riders of Mystery (1925)
- The Ridin' Streak (1925)
- King of the Saddle (1926)
- The Galloping Cowboy (1926)
- Gold from Weepah (1927)
- The Arizona Whirlwind (1927)
- Laddie Be Good (1928)
- The Price of Fear (1928)
- Wolves of the City (1929)
- Slim Fingers (1929)
- The Tip Off (1929)
- Eyes of the Underworld (1929)
- Under Texas Skies (1930)
- Dugan of the Badlands (1931)
- The Montana Kid (1931)
- Land of Wanted Men (1931)
- Oklahoma Jim (1931)
- Mason of the Mounted (1932)
- Ghost City (1932)
- Law of the North (1932)
- Texas Pioneers (1932)
- Frontier Days (1934)
- Western Racketeers (1934)
- The Reckless Buckaroo (1935)
- The Texas Rambler (1935)
- The Vanishing Riders (1935)
- Lawless Border (1935)
- The Cyclone Ranger (1935)
- Blazing Justice (1936)
- Outlaws of the Range (1936)
- The Fighting Gringo (1939)
