= Blake of Scotland Yard (1927 serial) =

1927 film

- Film poster
- Directed by: Robert F. Hill
- Written by: Robert F. Hill; William Lord Wright
- Starring: Hayden Stevenson; Gloria Grey; Grace Cunard
- Distributed by: Universal Pictures
- Release date: August 15, 1927
- Country: United States
- Language: Silent (English intertitles)

Blake of Scotland Yard is a 1927 American silent action film serial directed and co-written by Robert F. Hill. It starred Hayden Stevenson, Gloria Grey, Grace Cunard, and Monte Montague, plus an uncredited appearance by Walter Brennan. It was followed by a sequel, 1929's The Ace of Scotland Yard. Hill directed a remake in 1937.

== Cast ==
- Hayden Stevenson as Angus Blake
- Gloria Grey as Lady Diana Beresford
- Grace Cunard as Lady in White
- Herbert Prior as Lord Blanton
- Monte Montague as Jarvis
- Wilbur Mack as Albert Drexel
- Al Hart as The Spider (credited as Albert Hart)
- Walter Brennan as Henchman (uncredited)
- George Burton as Henchman (uncredited)
- Jack Kennedy as Henchman (uncredited)

== Chapter titles ==
1. The Castle of Fear
2. The Spider's Web
3. The Vanishing Heiress
4. The Room Without a Door
5. Shots in the Dark
6. Ambushed
7. The Fatal Drink
8. Into the Web
9. The Baited Trap
10. The Lady in White
11. The Closing Web
12. The Final Reckoning

== See also ==
- List of film serials
- List of film serials by studio
