= Land of Wanted Men =

1931 film

- Directed by: Harry L. Fraser
- Written by: Harry L. Fraser
- Produced by: Trem Carr
- Starring: Bill Cody; Sheila Bromley; Gibson Gowland
- Cinematography: Archie Stout
- Edited by: Leonard Wheeler
- Production company: Trem Carr Pictures
- Distributed by: Monogram Pictures
- Release date: October 30, 1931
- Running time: 62 minutes
- Country: United States
- Language: English

Land of Wanted Men is a 1931 American Western film directed by Harry L. Fraser and starring Bill Cody, Sheila Bromley and Gibson Gowland.

== Cast ==
- Bill Cody as Silent Saunders
- Andy Shuford as Mickey
- Sheila Bromley as Cynthia
- Gibson Gowland as Terry
- Jack Richardson as Thorpe
- Frank Lackteen as Lonie
- James A. Marcus as Judge

== Bibliography ==
- Pitts, Michael R. Western Movies: A Guide to 5,105 Feature Films. McFarland, 2012.
