= That Girl from Paris =

1936 film by Leigh Jason

- French poster
- Directed by: Leigh Jason
- Screenplay by: Jane Murfin; Joseph Fields
- Based on: Viennese Charmer; 1928 story in Young's Magazine by W. Carey Wonderly
- Produced by: Pandro S. Berman
- Starring: Lily Pons; Jack Oakie; Gene Raymond
- Cinematography: J. Roy Hunt
- Edited by: William Morgan
- Music by: Nathaniel Shilkret
- Production company: RKO Radio Pictures
- Distributed by: RKO Radio Pictures
- Release date: December 31, 1936 (New York City)
- Running time: 104 minutes
- Country: United States
- Language: English
- Budget: $534,000
- Box office: $1 million

That Girl from Paris is a 1936 American musical comedy film directed by Leigh Jason and starring Lily Pons, Jack Oakie, and Gene Raymond. The film made a profit of $101,000. John O. Aalberg was nominated for an Academy Award in the category Sound Recording.

== Plot ==
Nikki Martin, a Parisian opera star, takes off in search of adventure and true-love leaving her arranged husband to be at the altar. While hitchhiking, Nikki meets handsome American musician, Windy McLean and his band, the McLean Wildcats. Windy immediately spites her, but Nikki falls in love with him and follows him to New York by stowing away on the ship his on. The steward finds her hiding in Windy and the Wildcats room. She is locked up by authorities and Windy and the band are fired. When the ship reaches New York, Nikki escapes off the ship and finds out the Wildcats apartment. They demand her to leave, fearing being implicated but she refuses. Clair, Windy girlfriend shows up with Hammacher, and offers the band a low paying job at a roadhouse in another city. Anxious to depart, they accept. Nikki becomes the bands singer. Clair becomes jealous and reports her to the authorities, causing the band to flee again.

== Cast ==
- Lily Pons as Nicole 'Nikki' Martin
- Jack Oakie as Whammo Lonsdale
- Gene Raymond as Windy McLean
- Herman Bing as 'Hammy' Hammacher
- Mischa Auer as Butch
- Lucille Ball as Claire 'Clair' Williams
- Frank Jenks as Laughing Boy Frank
- Alec Craig as Justice of the Peace

== Critical reception ==
In their March, 1937 edition, Modern Screen gave the film a three-star review mainly on the basis of the performances and commented, "As a comedienne the diminutive star (Lily Pons) comes through in a big way, though responsibility for most of the laughs rests on the shoulders of Jack Oakie. Gene Raymond provides the heart interest and shares blonde honors with Lucille Ball, who is comely and capable in a minor role. Frank Jenks provides some excellent comedy, while Mischa Auer swipes every scene, as usual, when he comes within camera range." The reviewer was less impressed by the storyline and described it as "rather feeble" and concluded that overall "the picture falls short of the mark in several instances."
