= The Price of Fear (1928 film) =

1928 film

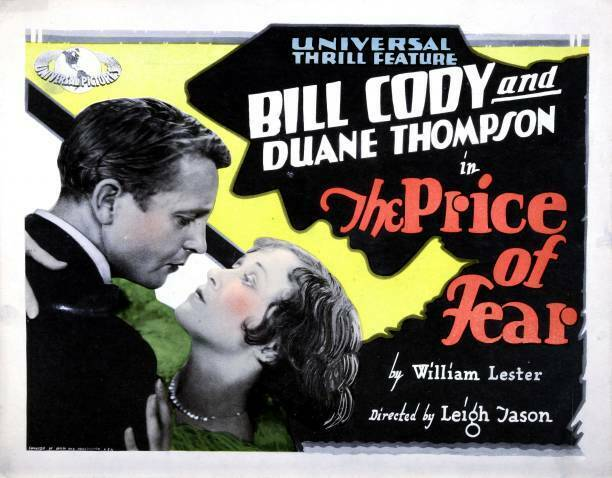
- Theatrical release poster
- Directed by: Leigh Jason
- Written by: William Berke; Carl Krusada
- Produced by: William Lord Wright
- Starring: Bill Cody; Duane Thompson; Tom London
- Cinematography: Charles J. Stumar
- Edited by: Harry Marker
- Production company: Universal Pictures
- Distributed by: Universal Pictures
- Release date: October 28, 1928
- Running time: 50 minutes
- Country: United States
- Languages: Silent; English intertitles

The Price of Fear is a 1928 American silent Western film directed by Leigh Jason and starring Bill Cody, Duane Thompson and Tom London.

== Cast ==
- Bill Cody as Grant Somers
- Duane Thompson as Mary Franklin
- Tom London as 'Flash' Hardy
- Grace Cunard as Satin Sadie
- Monte Montague as Monte
- Ole M. Ness as Michael Shane
- Jack Raymond as Toad Magee

== Bibliography ==
- Munden, Kenneth White. The American Film Institute Catalog of Motion Pictures Produced in the United States, Part 1. University of California Press, 1997.
