= The Texas Rambler =

- Theatrical release poster
- Directed by: Robert F. Hill
- Screenplay by: Oliver Drake
- Produced by: Ray Kirkwood
- Starring: Bill Cody; Marie Burton; Earle Hodgins; Stuart James; Mildred Rogers; Budd Buster
- Cinematography: William Hyer
- Edited by: Holbrook N. Todd
- Production company: Ray Kirkwood Productions
- Distributed by: Spectrum Pictures
- Release date: May 15, 1935
- Running time: 59 minutes
- Country: United States
- Language: English

The Texas Rambler is a 1935 American Western film directed by Robert F. Hill and written by Oliver Drake. The film stars Bill Cody, Marie Burton, Earle Hodgins, Stuart James, Mildred Rogers and Budd Buster. The film was released on May 15, 1935, by Spectrum Pictures.

== Cast ==
- Bill Cody as Tom 'The Rambler' Manning
- Marie Burton as Billie Conroy
- Earle Hodgins as Flash Carson
- Stuart James as Larry Morrison
- Mildred Rogers as Rosa
- Budd Buster as Seth Higgins
- Roger Williams as Butch
- Ace Cain as Pete
- Buck Morgan as Mike
- Allen Greer as Sheriff
