= Slim Fingers =

1929 film

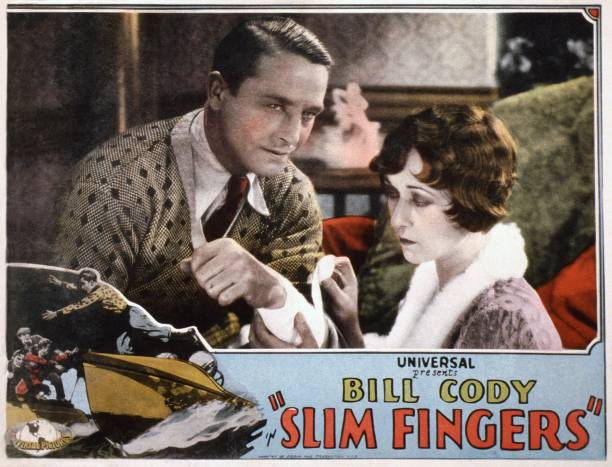
- Theatrical release poster
- Directed by: Joseph Levigard
- Screenplay by: William Berke; Carl Krusada
- Starring: Bill Cody; Duane Thompson; Wilbur Mack; Monte Montague; Arthur Morrison; Charles King
- Cinematography: Charles J. Stumar
- Edited by: Harry Marker
- Production company: Universal Pictures
- Distributed by: Universal Pictures
- Release date: March 24, 1929
- Running time: 50 minutes
- Country: United States
- Language: English

Slim Fingers is a 1929 American crime film directed by Joseph Levigard and written by William Berke and Carl Krusada. The film stars Bill Cody, Duane Thompson, Wilbur Mack, Monte Montague, Arthur Morrison and Charles King. The film was released on March 24, 1929, by Universal Pictures.

== Cast ==
- Bill Cody as Al Wellsley
- Duane Thompson as Kate
- Wilbur Mack as Dan Donovan
- Monte Montague as Valet
- Arthur Morrison as Riley
- Charles King as Morgan
