= The Carnival Man =

1929 film

- Directed by: George Abbott
- Starring: Walter Huston; Ninetta Sunderland
- Production company: Paramount Pictures
- Release date: January 31, 1929 (United States)
- Running time: 15 minutes
- Country: United States
- Language: English

The Carnival Man is a 1929 American sound short drama film, directed by George Abbott and starring Walter Huston.

The film is fifteen minutes long and it is the first film appearance of Huston, the father of actor and director John Huston and grandfather of actress Anjelica Huston. The female lead was Ninetta (Nan) Sunderland, who would marry Walter Huston in 1931. It was filmed Paramount Studios and Kaufman Astoria Studios, both in New York City.

It is unknown whether the film survives.

== Cast ==
- Walter Huston
- Ninetta Sunderland (credited as Nan Sunderland)

== See also ==
- 1929 in film
- List of American films of 1929
