= The Great Circus Mystery =

1925 film

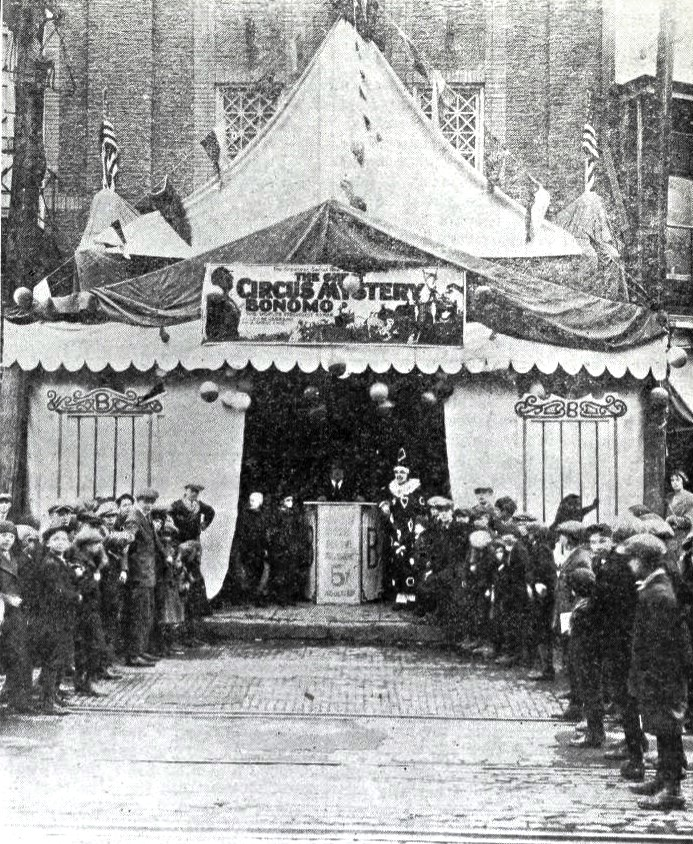
- Entrance to Bijou Theatre in Trenton, New Jersey, decorated for showing the serial
- Directed by: Jay Marchant
- Written by: Isadore Bernstein; George Morgan; William Lord Wright
- Starring: Joe Bonomo; Louise Lorraine
- Distributed by: Universal Pictures
- Release date: March 9, 1925
- Running time: 15 episodes
- Country: United States
- Language: Silent (English intertitles)

The Great Circus Mystery is a 1925 American adventure film serial directed by Jay Marchant.

== Cast ==
- Joe Bonomo as Welles 'Red' Landow
- Louise Lorraine as Trixie Tremaine
- Robert Graves as Adams (credited as Robert J. Graves)
- Robert Seiter as Darrell
- Carmen Phillips as Natchi
- Slim Cole as Mystery Man
- Sam Polo
- Albert Prisco
- Monte Montague
- Jack A. Goodrich
- Floyd Criswell
- Eduardo Martini
- Charles Murphy (credited as Carlo De Bernardi)
- Cecil Woodworth
- Tul Loraine
- Carlotta
- Charles Magetti
- Tony Brock
- Morgan Brown
- Buck Russ
- Frank Coghlan Jr. (credited as Junior Coghlan)

== Chapter titles ==
1. Pact of Peril
2. A Cry for Help
3. A Race with Death
4. The Plunge of Peril
5. The Ladder of Life
6. A Leap for Liberty
7. Harvest of Hate
8. Fires of Fate
9. Cycle of Fear
10. The Leopard Queen
11. The Sacred Ruby
12. Dive of Destiny
13. A Leap for Liberty
14. Buried Treasure
15. The Leopard Strikes

== See also ==
- List of film serials
- List of film serials by studio
- List of lost films
