= Ghost City (film) =

1932 film

- Directed by: Harry L. Fraser
- Written by: Harry L. Fraser; Wellyn Totman; George Arthur Durlam
- Produced by: Trem Carr; W. Ray Johnston
- Starring: Bill Cody; Andy Shuford; Helen Foster
- Cinematography: Archie Stout
- Edited by: J. Logan Pearson
- Production company: Trem Carr Pictures
- Distributed by: Monogram Pictures
- Release date: January 2, 1932
- Running time: 60 minutes
- Country: United States
- Language: English

Ghost City is a 1932 American western film directed by Harry L. Fraser and starring Bill Cody, Andy Shuford and Helen Foster. It was distributed by Monogram Pictures which specialized in low-budget second features, many of them westerns.

== Cast ==
- Bill Cody as Bill Temple
- Andy Shuford as Andy Blane
- Helen Foster as Laura Martin
- Walter Miller as Jim P. Blane
- Thomas A. Curran as Piano Player
- Kate Campbell as Ruby Blane
- Charles King as Buck
- Walter Shumway as Henchman
- Jack Carlyle as Henchman
- Si Jenks as Whiskey Pete

== Bibliography ==
- Pitts, Michael R. Western Movies: A Guide to 5,105 Feature Films. McFarland, 2012.
