= Western Racketeers =

1934 film

- Directed by: Robert J. Horner
- Written by: James P. Hogan
- Produced by: Nathan Hirsh
- Starring: Bill Cody; Edna Aslin; Hal Taliaferro
- Cinematography: Brydon Baker; Frank Bender
- Edited by: Henry Adams
- Production company: Aywon Film Corporation
- Distributed by: Spectrum Pictures
- Release date: April 2, 1934
- Running time: 55 minutes
- Country: United States
- Language: English

Western Racketeers is a 1934 American western film directed by Robert J. Horner and starring Bill Cody, Edna Aslin and Hal Taliaferro It was an independent film produced on Poverty Row.

== Plot ==
In the San Bernardino Mountains, cattlemen form a vigilante group to protect themselves from a gang who are murdering ranchers who won't pay their protection racket.

== Cast ==
- Bill Cody as Bill Bowers
- Edna Aslin as Molly Spellman
- Hal Taliaferro as Sheriff Rawlings
- George Chesebro as Fargo Roberts
- Richard Cramer as The Coroner
- Bud Osborne as Blackie - Henchman
- Frank Clark as Steve Harding / Tiny Harding
- Tom Dwaine as Mullins
- Ben Corbett as Mike
- Robert Sands as Sam Spellman
- Billy Franey as The Informer
- Gilbert Holmes as Breed Morgan
- Blackjack Ward as Henchman
- Wally West as Cowhand
- Gene Alsace as Cowhand
- Budd Buster as Cowhand

== Bibliography ==
- Pitts, Michael R. Poverty Row Studios, 1929–1940. McFarland & Company, 2005.
