= Mason of the Mounted =

1932 film

- Directed by: Harry L. Fraser
- Written by: Harry L. Fraser (story and scenario)
- Produced by: Trem Carr (producer)
- Cinematography: Archie Stout
- Edited by: J. Logan Pearson
- Production company: Trem Carr Pictures
- Distributed by: Monogram Pictures
- Release date: 1932
- Running time: 58 minutes
- Country: United States
- Language: English

Mason of the Mounted is a 1932 American pre-Code Western film directed by Harry L. Fraser. It was the fourth Monogram Pictures eight-film Western film series "the Bill and Andy series" with Bill Cody co-starring with child actor Andy Shuford.

== Plot ==
North-West Mounted Police Constable Bill Mason and two other Mounties are chasing a murderer who shoots and wounds one of them. When the murderer has entered the United States, Bill Mason goes undercover to get his man and bring him back to Canada for justice. He finds that the murderer, now calling himself Calhoun is leading a group of rustlers. Without knowing his true identity, the locals have Mason elected as the head of a vigilante committee to stop the rustling.

== Cast ==
- Bill Cody as Bill Mason
- Andy Shuford as Andy Kirby, Luke's Nephew
- Nancy Drexel as Marion Kirby
- LeRoy Mason as Calhoun
- Jack Carlyle as Luke Kirby, Marion's Father
- James A. Marcus as Marshal
- Art Smith as R.N.W.M.P, Officer
