= William L. Thorne =

American actor

- Born: October 14, 1878; Fresno, California
- Died: March 10, 1948 (aged 69); Fresno, California
- Occupation: Actor
- Years active: 1926–1939

William L. Thorne (October 14, 1878 in Fresno, California – March 10, 1948 in Fresno, California) was an American film actor.

On Broadway, Thorne appeared in The Tavern (1921) and Big Boy (1925).

== Partial filmography ==
- The Kick Off (1926)
- Thunderbolt (1929) - Police Inspector
- The Drake Case (1929) - Captain Condon
- Peacock Alley (1930) - Dugan
- Abraham Lincoln (1930) - Tom Lincoln (as W. L. Thorne)
- The Lash (1930) - Landlord of the Bella Union Cantina (uncredited)
- Fighting Thru (1930) - Ace Brady
- Finger Prints (1931, Serial) - Joe Burke
- The She-Wolf (1931) - detective Burke
- The Montana Kid (1931) - Chuck Larson
- Danger Island (1931, Serial) - Bull Black
- The Rainbow Trail (1932) - King Dyer
- Vanishing Men (1932) - Bat Morrison
- Law of the North (1932) - Judge Hanley
- Clancy of the Mounted (1933) - Black MacDougal
- Pirate Treasure (1934) - Drake
- The Whole Town's Talking (1935) - Policeman (uncredited)
- Night Life of the Gods (1935) - Detective (uncredited)
- The Roaring West (1935) - Marco Brett
- Nevada (1935) - Poker player
- Paradise Express (1937) - Farmer at meeting (uncredited)
- The Gold Racket (1937) - McKenzie
- Bank Alarm (1937) - Police Inspector J.C. Macy
- Love Takes Flight (1937) - Bill Parker Sr.
- The Man Who Dared (1939) - Fire Chief (uncredited)
- The Forgotten Woman (1939) - Policeman (uncredited)
- The Man from Sundown (1939) - Sam Cooper (uncredited) (final film role)
