= The Fighting Gringo (1939 film) =

1939 film by David Howard

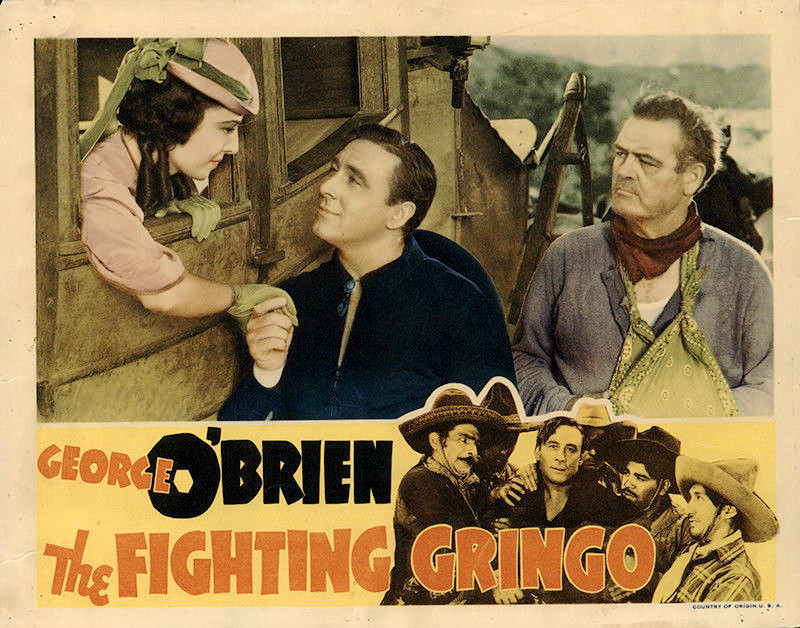
- Directed by: David Howard
- Written by: Oliver Drake
- Produced by: Bert Gilroy
- Starring: George O'Brien; Lupita Tovar
- Cinematography: Harry J. Wild
- Edited by: Frederic Knudtson
- Music by: Roy Webb
- Distributed by: RKO Pictures
- Release date: August 8, 1939
- Running time: 59 min
- Country: United States
- Language: English

The Fighting Gringo is a 1939 Western film directed by David Howard and featuring George O'Brien, Lupita Tovar and William Royle. The picture was produced under the RKO Pictures banner. Ben Johnson had a small uncredited early role as a Mexican barfly and did some work as a stuntman.

A copy is held at the Library of Congress.

== Cast ==
- George O'Brien as Wade Barton
- Lupita Tovar as Anita 'Nita' del Campo
- Lucio Villegas as Don Aliso del Campo
- William Royle as Ben Wallace
- Glenn Strange as Rance Potter
- Slim Whitaker as Monty Bates (as Slim Whittaker)
- LeRoy Mason as John Courtney
- Mary Field as Sandra Courtney
- Martin Garralaga as Pedro, ranch foreman
- Dick Botiller as Jose, del Campo Vaquero
- Bill Cody as Sheriff Fred Warren (as Bill Cody Sr.)
- Cactus Mack as Utah Jones
- Chris-Pin Martin as Felipe, barber
- Ben Johnson as Mexican barfly (uncredited)
- Sid Jordan as Buck, stage driver (uncredited)
- Forrest Taylor as Foreman of coroner's jury (uncredited)

== See also ==
- The Fighting Gringo (1917 film)
