= King of the Rodeo (film) =

1929 film

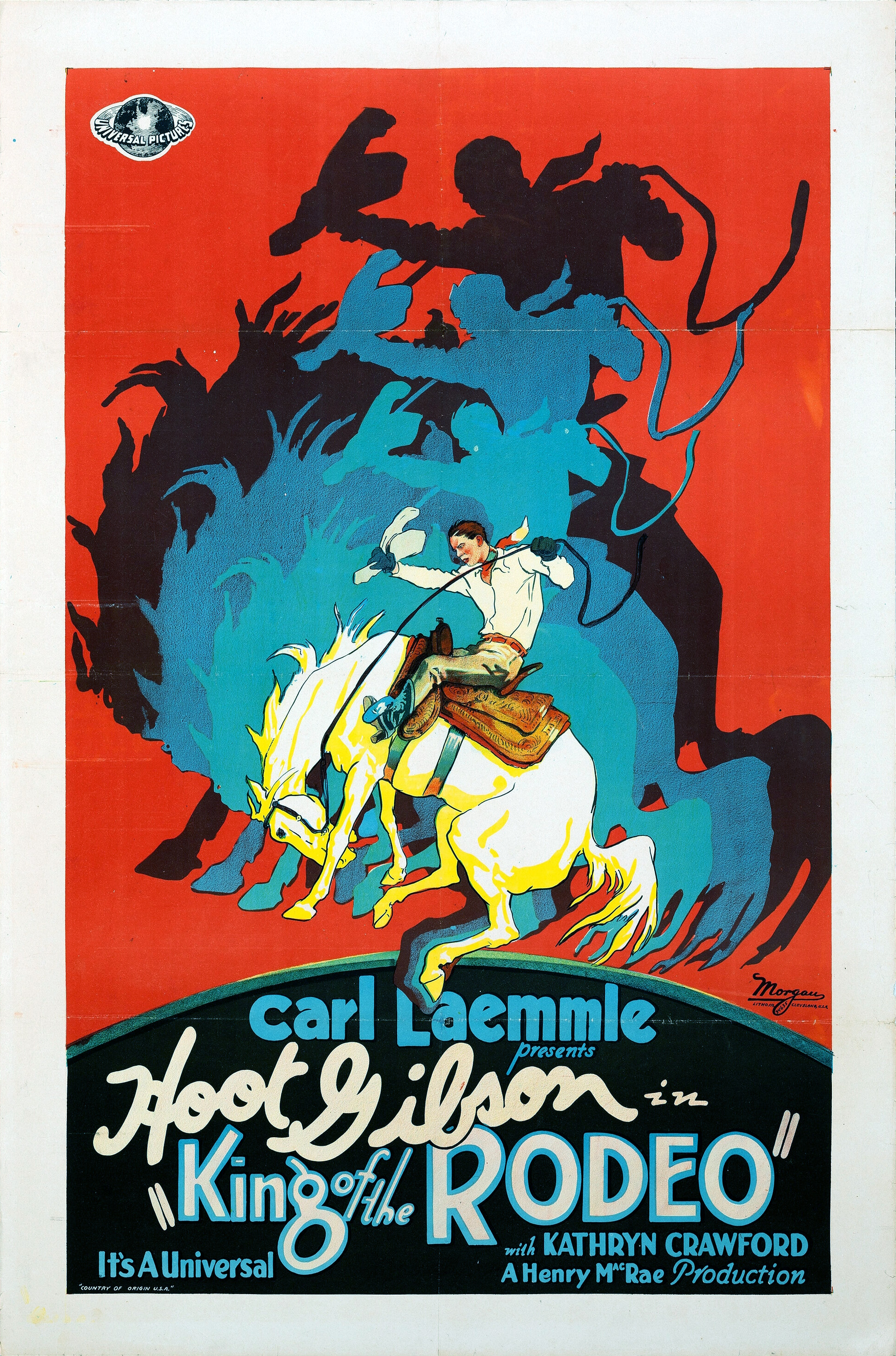
- Theatrical one-sheet release poster
- Directed by: Henry MacRae
- Written by: George Morgan (writer); Harold Tarshis (titles)
- Story by: Bertha Muzzy Sinclair (as B.M. Bower)
- Produced by: Hoot Gibson
- Starring: Hoot Gibson
- Cinematography: Harry Neuman
- Production company: Universal Pictures
- Distributed by: Universal Pictures
- Release date: January 6, 1929
- Running time: 6 reels
- Country: United States
- Language: Silent (English intertitles)

King of the Rodeo is a 1929 American silent Western film directed by Henry MacRae and produced by and starring Hoot Gibson. It was distributed through Universal Pictures.

== Plot ==
Gibson here plays Montana Kid, son of the lead character in Chip of the Flying U (1926).

== Cast ==
- Hoot Gibson as Montana Kid
- Kathryn Crawford as Dulcie Harlan
- Slim Summerville as Slim
- Charles K. French as Chip Sr.
- Monte Montague as Weasel
- Joseph W. Girard as Harlan
- Jack Knapp as Shorty
- Harry Todd as J. G.
- Bodil Rosing as Mother

== Preservation status ==
A print has been preserved at the Library of Congress Packard Campus for Audio-Visual Conservation.
