= Under Texas Skies (1930 film) =

Film directed by J.P. McGowan

- Directed by: J. P. McGowan
- Written by: George Arthur Durlam
- Produced by: George Arthur Durlam (producer)
- Starring: See below
- Cinematography: Otto Himm
- Edited by: Arthur A. Brooks
- Production company: G.A. Durlam Productions
- Distributed by: Syndicate Pictures
- Release date: 1930
- Running time: 57 minutes 51 minutes (DVD)
- Country: United States
- Language: English

Under Texas Skies is a 1930 American Western film directed by J.P. McGowan.

== Cast ==
- Bob Custer as Bob Bainbridge - Posing as Rankin
- Natalie Kingston as Joan Prescott
- Bill Cody as Army Captain Jack Hartford
- Tom London as The Boss / Captain Hartford
- Lane Chandler as "Singer" Martin (Secret Service agent)
- Bob Roper as Dummy (the mute brute)
- William McCall as Deputy Marshal Walsh
- Joe Smith Marba as Sheriff H. Moody

== Plot ==
Joan Prescott has a contract to sell her horses to Captain Hartford for the U.S. Army. The man she knows as Hartford is actually an impostor who has arranged for the horses to be stolen, with the theft blamed on Tom Rankin. Rankin eventually recovers the horses and reveals that he is the real Hartford.

== Production ==
In addition to McGowan as director, W. Ray Johnson was the producer. Arthur A. Brooks was the editor, Otto Himm was the cinematographer, and G. A. Durlam was the screenwriter.
