= Wolves of the City =

1929 film

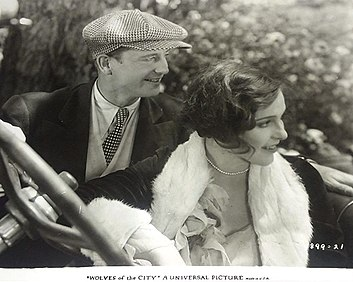
- Directed by: Leigh Jason
- Screenplay by: Carl Krusada; Vin Moore
- Story by: Carl Krusada; Vin Moore
- Starring: Bill Cody; Sally Blane; Al Ferguson; Monte Montague; Louise Carver; Charles Clary
- Cinematography: Charles J. Stumar
- Edited by: Harry Marker
- Production company: Universal Pictures
- Distributed by: Universal Pictures
- Release date: February 24, 1929
- Running time: 50 minutes
- Country: United States
- Language: English

Wolves of the City is a 1929 American crime film directed by Leigh Jason and written by Carl Krusada and Vin Moore. The film stars Bill Cody, Sally Blane, Al Ferguson, Monte Montague, Louise Carver and Charles Clary. The film was released on February 24, 1929, by Universal Pictures.

== Cast ==
- Bill Cody as Jack Flynn
- Sally Blane as Helen Marsh
- Al Ferguson as Mike
- Monte Montague as Roscoe Jones
- Louise Carver as Mother Machin
- Charles Clary as Frank Marsh
