= Shanghai Rose (film) =

1929 film

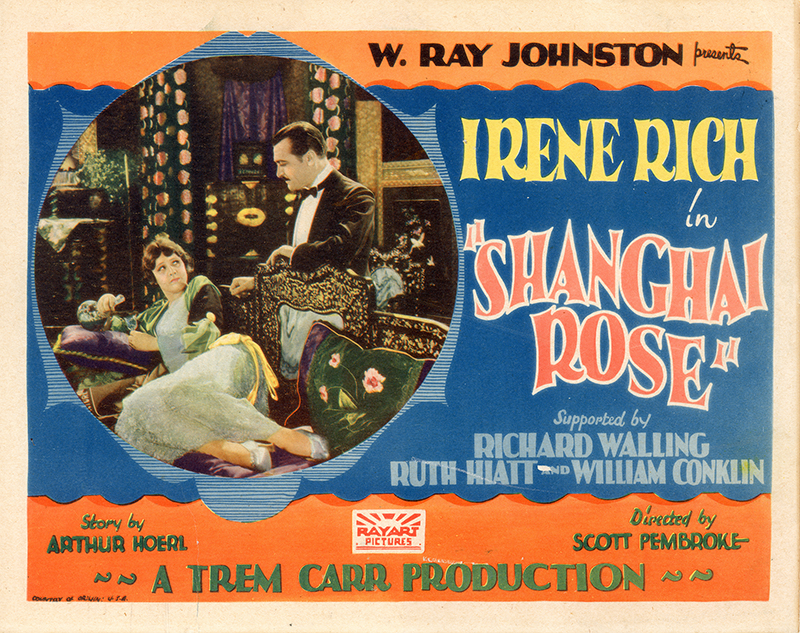
- Directed by: Scott Pembroke
- Written by: Arthur Hoerl
- Produced by: Trem Carr
- Starring: Irene Rich; William Conklin; Ruth Hiatt
- Cinematography: Hap Depew
- Edited by: J.S. Harrington
- Production company: Trem Carr Pictures
- Distributed by: Rayart Pictures
- Release date: February 1929
- Country: United States
- Languages: Silent; English intertitles

Shanghai Rose is a lost 1929 American silent action film directed by Scott Pembroke and starring Irene Rich, William Conklin and Ruth Hiatt.

== Cast ==
- Irene Rich as Shanghai Rose
- William Conklin as Henry West
- Richard Walling as Gregor West
- Ruth Hiatt as Diane Avery
- Tony Merlo as Ivan Kahn
- Syd Saylor as Xavier Doolittle
- Robert Dudley as Reformer
- De Sacia Mooers as Mrs. Doolittle

== Bibliography ==
- Bell, Geoffrey. The Golden Gate and the Silver Screen. Associated University Presse, 1984.
