= Plunging Hoofs =

1929 film

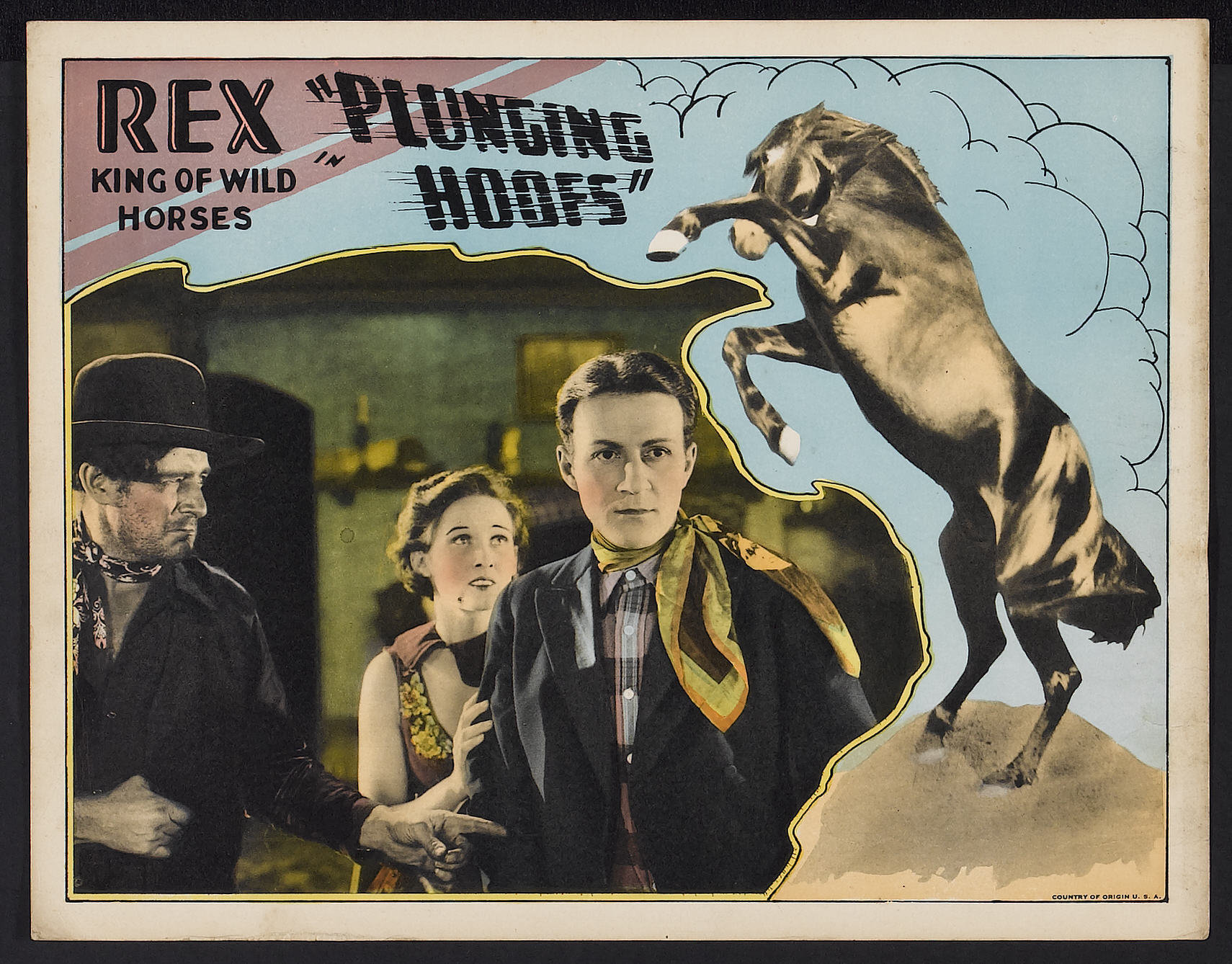
- Directed by: Henry MacRae
- Screenplay by: George Morgan; Gardner Bradford
- Story by: Basil Dickey; William Lord Wright
- Starring: Starlight the Horse; Rex the Wonder Horse; Jack Perrin; Barbara Worth; J. P. McGowan; David Dunbar
- Cinematography: George Robinson
- Edited by: Tom Malloy
- Production company: Universal Pictures
- Distributed by: Universal Pictures
- Release date: April 10, 1929
- Running time: 50 minutes
- Country: United States
- Languages: Silent; English intertitles

Plunging Hoofs is a 1929 American silent Western film directed by Henry MacRae and written by George Morgan and Gardner Bradford. The film stars Starlight the Horse, Rex the Wonder Horse, Jack Perrin, Barbara Worth, J. P. McGowan and David Dunbar. The film was released on April 10, 1929, by Universal Pictures.

== Cast ==
- Starlight the Horse as Starlight
- Rex the Wonder Horse as Rex
- Jack Perrin as Parson Jed Campbell
- Barbara Worth as Nanette
- J. P. McGowan as Jim Wales
- David Dunbar as 'Squint' Jones
