= Some Mother's Boy =

1929 silent film

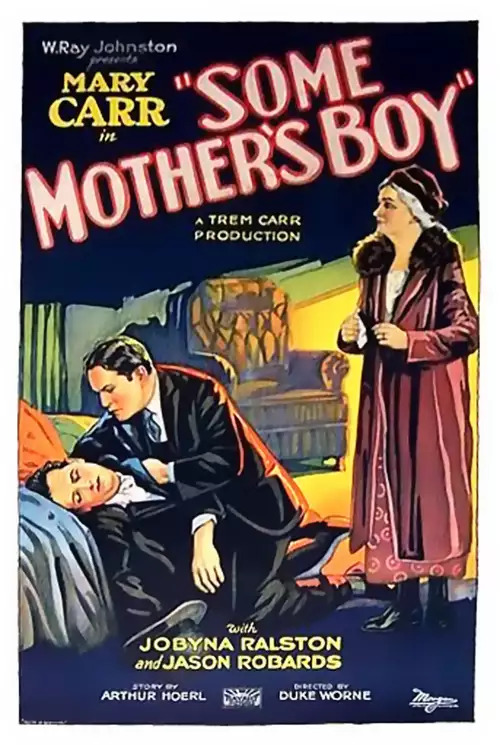
- Directed by: Duke Worne
- Written by: Arthur Hoerl; Bennett Cohen
- Produced by: Trem Carr
- Starring: Mary Carr; Jason Robards Sr. Jobyna Ralston
- Cinematography: Hap Depew
- Edited by: John S. Harrington
- Production company: Trem Carr Pictures
- Distributed by: Rayart Pictures
- Release date: February 15, 1929
- Running time: 60 minutes
- Country: United States
- Languages: Silent; English intertitles

Some Mother's Boy is a 1929 American silent drama film directed by Duke Worne and starring Mary Carr, Jason Robards Sr. and Jobyna Ralston.

== Synopsis ==
When two young tearaways are fleeing from the scene of a crime one is shot and the other escapes. He makes his way to the home of his companion's mother, who recognizes him as the son she has been separated from for fifteen years.

== Cast ==
- Mary Carr as The Mother
- Jason Robards Sr. as The Boy
- Jobyna Ralston as The Girl
- M.A. Dickinson as The Son
- Henry A. Barrows as The Salesman

== Bibliography ==
- Munden, Kenneth White. The American Film Institute Catalog of Motion Pictures Produced in the United States, Part 1. University of California Press, 1997.
