= The Drake Case =

1929 film

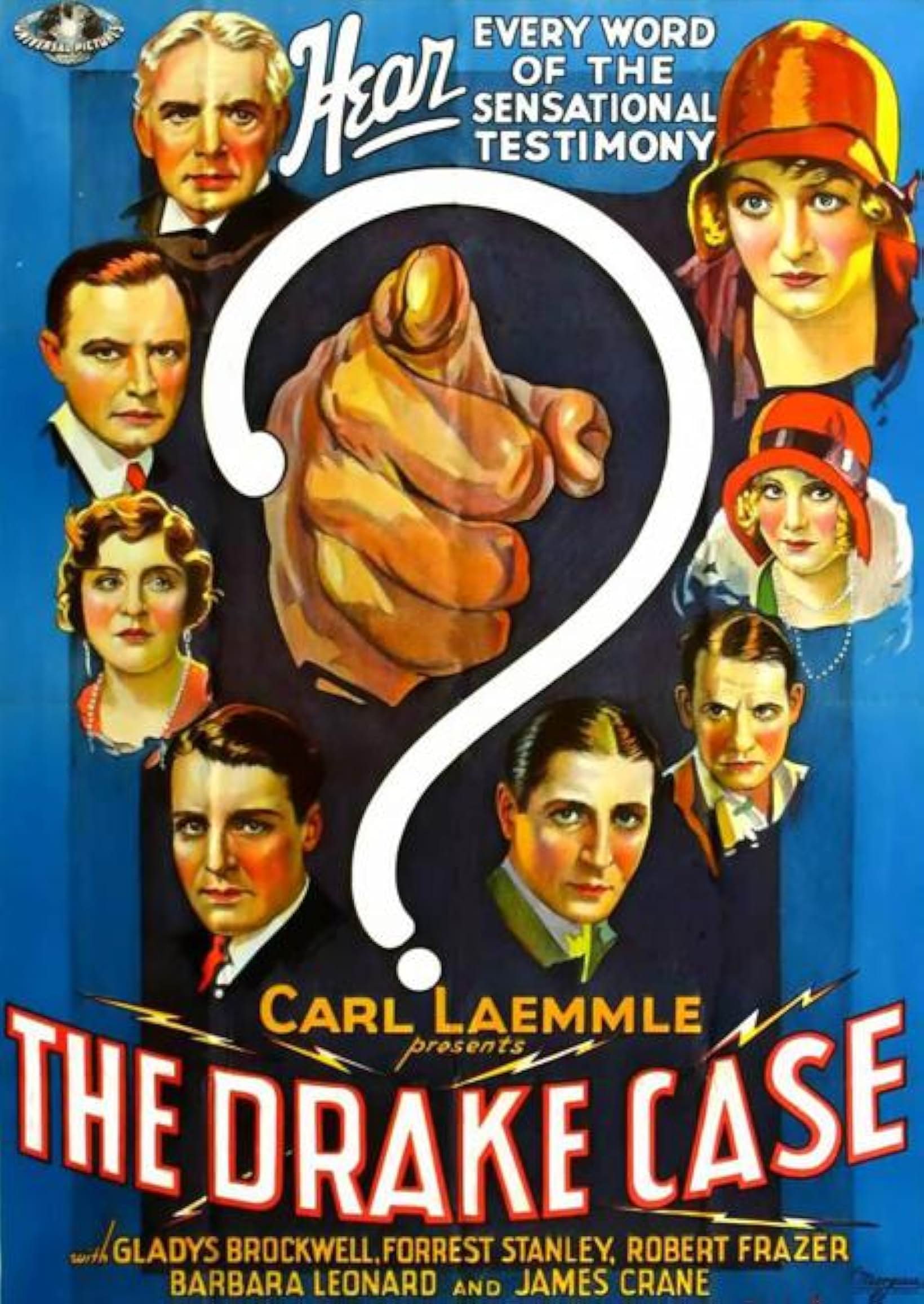
- Theatrical release poster
- Directed by: Edward Laemmle
- Screenplay by: J.G. Hawks; Charles Logue; Dudley Early
- Produced by: Edward Laemmle
- Starring: Gladys Brockwell; Forrest Stanley; Robert Frazer; Doris Lloyd
- Cinematography: Jerome Ash
- Edited by: Ted J. Kent
- Production company: Universal Pictures
- Distributed by: Universal Pictures
- Release date: September 1, 1929
- Running time: 74 minutes
- Country: United States
- Language: English

The Drake Case is a 1929 American pre-Code mystery film directed by Edward Laemmle and written by J.G. Hawks, Charles Logue and Dudley Early. The film stars Gladys Brockwell, Forrest Stanley, Robert Frazer, and Doris Lloyd. The film was released on September 1, 1929, by Universal Pictures.

== Cast ==
- Gladys Brockwell as Lulu Marks
- Forrest Stanley as District Attorney
- Robert Frazer as Roger Lane
- James Crane as Hugo Jepson
- Barbara Leonard as Mrs. Drake
- Doris Lloyd as Georgia
- William L. Thorne as Captain Condon
- Guy Edward Hearn as Edmonds
- Tom Dugan as Bill

== See also ==
- List of early sound feature films (1926–1929)
