= When Dreams Come True (1929 film) =

1929 silent film

- Argentine poster
- Directed by: Duke Worne
- Written by: Arthur Hoerl
- Produced by: Trem Carr
- Starring: Helene Costello; Rex Lease; Claire McDowell
- Cinematography: Hap Depew
- Edited by: John S. Harrington
- Production company: Trem Carr Pictures
- Distributed by: Rayart Pictures
- Release date: January 15, 1929
- Running time: 75 minutes
- Country: United States
- Languages: Silent; English intertitles

When Dreams Come True is a 1929 American silent drama film directed by Duke Worne and starring Helene Costello, Rex Lease and Claire McDowell.

== Synopsis ==
Ben Shelby, a blacksmith, is in love with Caroline Swayne but her wealthy father rejects the marriage. When he is found murdered shortly afterwards, suspicion falls on Shelby. However he is able to prove that he innocent, and identify the real culprit who killed Swayne to prevent his horse running in a major race.

== Cast ==
- Helene Costello as Caroline Swayne
- Rex Lease as Ben Shelby
- Claire McDowell as Martha Shelby
- Danny Hoy as Jack Boyle
- Ernest Hilliard as Jim Leeson
- Buddy Brown as Billy Shelby
- George Periolat as Robert Swayne
- Emmett King as Judge Clayburn

== Bibliography ==
- Munden, Kenneth White. The American Film Institute Catalog of Motion Pictures Produced in the United States, Part 1. University of California Press, 1997.
