= Eyes of the Underworld (1929 film) =

1929 film

- Directed by: Leigh Jason; Ray Taylor
- Screenplay by: Leigh Jason; Carl Krusada
- Story by: Leigh Jason; Carl Krusada
- Starring: Bill Cody; Sally Blane; Arthur Lubin; Harry Tenbrook; Charles Clary; Monte Montague
- Cinematography: Alan Jones; Frank Redman
- Production company: Universal Pictures
- Distributed by: Universal Pictures
- Release date: April 28, 1929
- Running time: 78 minutes
- Country: United States
- Language: English

Eyes of the Underworld is a 1929 American crime film directed by Leigh Jason and Ray Taylor and written by Leigh Jason and Carl Krusada. The film stars Bill Cody, Sally Blane, Arthur Lubin, Harry Tenbrook, Charles Clary and Monte Montague. The film was released on April 28, 1929, by Universal Pictures.

== Cast ==
- Bill Cody as Pat Doran
- Sally Blane as Florence Hueston
- Arthur Lubin as Gang Leader
- Harry Tenbrook as Gimpy Johnson
- Charles Clary as John Hueston
- Monte Montague as Gardener
