= Bride of the Desert =

1929 film

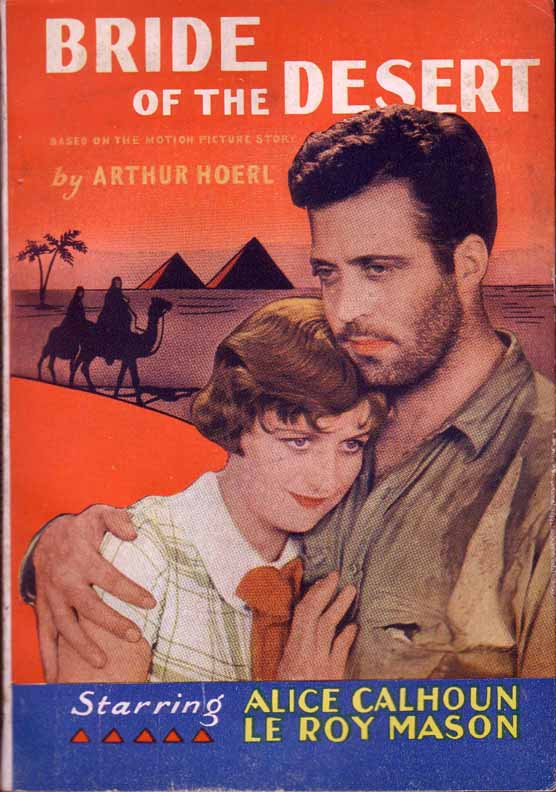
- Cover of the novelization of the film.
- Directed by: Duke Worne
- Written by: Arthur Hoerl
- Produced by: Trem Carr
- Starring: Alice Calhoun; LeRoy Mason; Ethan Laidlaw
- Cinematography: Hap Depew
- Edited by: John S. Harrington
- Production company: Trem Carr Pictures
- Distributed by: Rayart Pictures
- Release date: September 4, 1929
- Running time: 57 minutes
- Country: United States
- Language: English

Bride of the Desert is a 1929 American Partial Talkie Western film directed by Duke Worne and starring Alice Calhoun, LeRoy Mason and Ethan Laidlaw.

== Cast ==
- Alice Calhoun as Joanna Benton
- LeRoy Mason as Fugitive
- Ethan Laidlaw as Tom Benton
- Lum Chan as Wang
- Walter Ackerman as Solomon Murphy
- Horace B. Carpenter as Sheriff
