= Leigh Jason =

American film director

- Born: July 26, 1904; New York, New York, United States
- Died: February 19, 1979 (aged 74); Woodland Hills, Los Angeles, United States
- Occupations: Film director, screenwriter
- Years active: 1925–1962

Leigh Jason (July 26, 1904 – February 19, 1979) was an American film director and screenwriter. He was born in New York, New York, and died in Woodland Hills, Los Angeles.

He married Ruth Harriet Louise in 1927 at Temple B'nai B'rith, with William Wyler as his best man. Louise was the first woman photographer active in Hollywood, and ran Metro-Goldwyn-Mayer's portrait studio from 1925 to 1930. They had a son, Leigh Jr., who died of leukemia when he was five years old, and Louise died in 1940, along with their second son, in complications from childbirth.

== Filmography ==
- The Price of Fear (1928)
- Wolves of the City (1929)
- Eyes of the Underworld (1929)
- The Tip Off (1929)
- The Body Punch (1929)
- Humanettes (1930)
- High Gear (1933)
- A Preferred List (1933)
- Bubbling Over (1934)
- The Knife of the Party (1934)
- Apples to You! (1934)
- Roamin' Vandals (1934)
- Nifty Nurses (1934)
- How to Break 90 at Croquet (1935)
- The Spirit of 1976 (1935)
- Hail, Brother (1935)
- Metropolitan Nocturne (1935)
- Love on a Bet (1936)
- The Bride Walks Out (1936)
- That Girl from Paris (1936)
- New Faces of 1937 (1937)
- Wise Girl (1937)
- The Mad Miss Manton (1938)
- The Flying Irishman (1939)
- Career (1939)
- Model Wife (1941)
- Three Girls About Town (1941)
- Lady for a Night (1942)
- Dangerous Blondes (1943)
- Nine Girls (1944)
- Carolina Blues (1944)
- Meet Me on Broadway (1946)
- Lost Honeymoon (1947)
- Out of the Blue (1947)
- Man from Texas (1948)
- Okinawa (1952)
- The Go-Getter (1956)
- The Choppers (1961)
- The Festival Girls (1961)
