= Handcuffed =

1929 film

- Directed by: Duke Worne
- Written by: Arthur Hoerl
- Produced by: Trem Carr; W. Ray Johnston
- Starring: Virginia Brown Faire; Wheeler Oakman; Dean Jagger
- Cinematography: Hap Depew
- Edited by: John S. Harrington
- Production company: Trem Carr Pictures
- Distributed by: Rayart Pictures
- Release date: August 8, 1929
- Running time: 60 minutes
- Country: United States
- Languages: Silent; English intertitles

Handcuffed is a 1929 American silent mystery film directed by Duke Worne and starring Virginia Brown Faire, Wheeler Oakman and Dean Jagger.

== Synopsis ==
Gerald Morely's father is ruined in a stock fraud and commits suicide. When shortly afterwards the man who perpetrated it is murdered, the evidence is framed so that Gerald appears guilty.

== Cast ==
- Virginia Brown Faire as Gloria Randall
- Wheeler Oakman as Tom Bennett
- Dean Jagger as Gerald Morely
- James Harrison as Billy Hatton
- Broderick O'Farrell as John Randall
- George Chesebro as Detective
