= The Tip Off =

1929 film

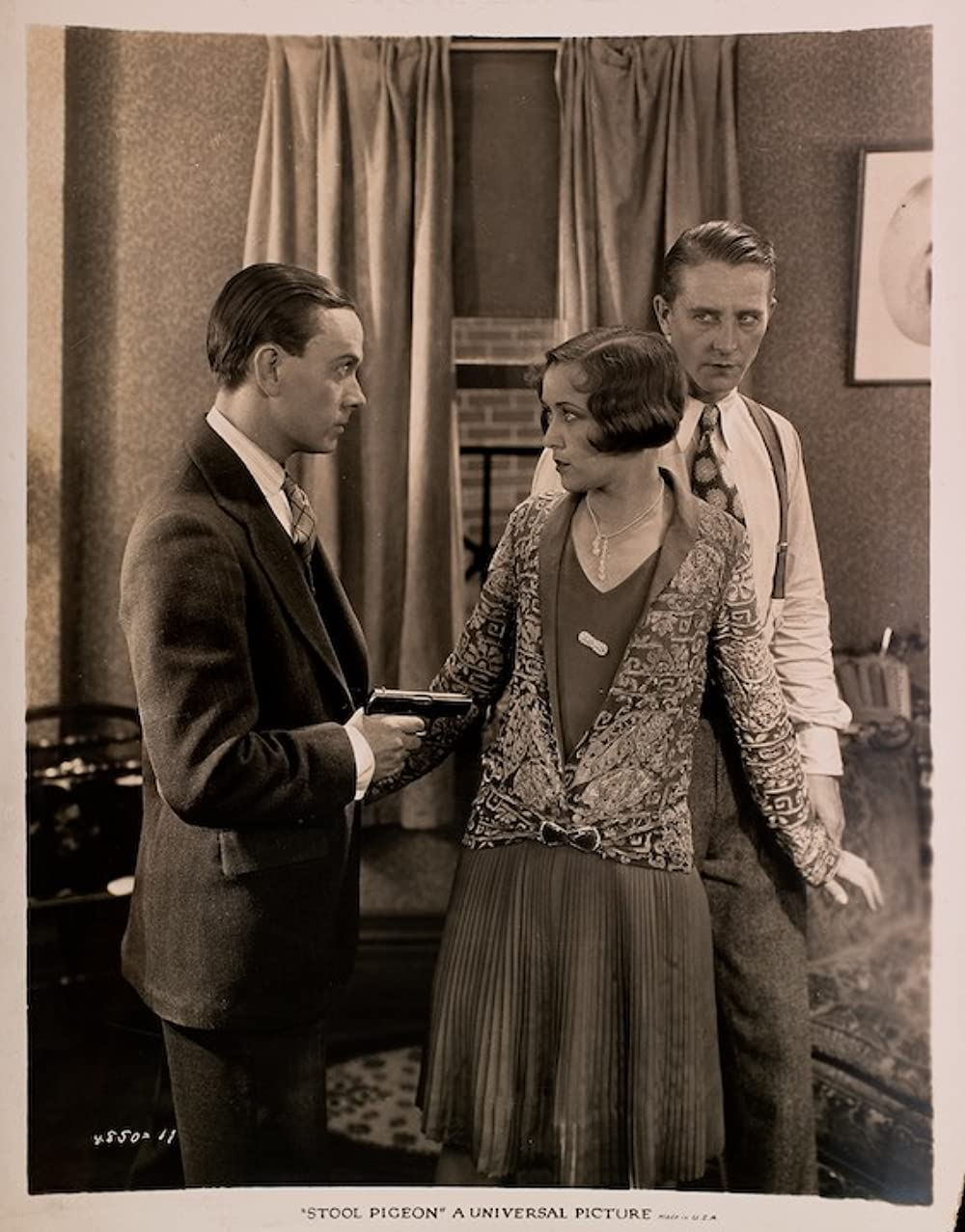
- Directed by: Leigh Jason
- Written by: Basil Dickey; Carl Krusada
- Produced by: William Lord Wright
- Starring: Bill Cody; George Hackathorne; Duane Thompson
- Cinematography: Charles J. Stumar
- Edited by: Frank Atkinson
- Production company: Universal Pictures
- Distributed by: Universal Pictures
- Release date: April 1, 1929
- Running time: 55 minutes
- Country: United States
- Languages: Silent; English intertitles

The Tip Off (also written as The Tip-Off) is a lost 1929 American silent crime drama film directed by Leigh Jason and starring Bill Cody, George Hackathorne and Duane Thompson. It was shot at Universal Studios, just as the company was producing its last silents amidst the conversion to sound. It was originally registered under the working title The Stool Pigeon, but this was changed possibly due to the similarity to Columbia's Stool Pigeon. In Britain it was released under the alternative title Underworld Love.

== Synopsis ==
Riley, a crook is on the run from the law with his associated Jimmy Lamar. They shelter with Riley's girlfriend Annie, a fortune teller. She falls for Lamar, who is planning to go straight. Once he discovers this Riley pressures Lamar into a new job, intending to frame him up. However, Annie foresees this in her crystal ball and warns Lamar.

== Cast ==
- Bill Cody as Jimmy Lamar
- George Hackathorne as 'Shrimp' Riley
- Duane Thompson as Crystal Annie
- L.J. O'Connor as Capt. McHugh
- Jack Singleton as Confidence Man
- Robert Bolder as Duke
- Monte Montague as Negro
- Walter Shumway as Stock Salesman

== Preservation ==
With no holdings located in archives, The Tip Off is considered a lost film.

== Bibliography ==
- Munden, Kenneth White. The American Film Institute Catalog of Motion Pictures Produced in the United States, Part 1. University of California Press, 1997.
