= Trem Carr =

American film producer

- Born: Tremlet C. Carr; November 6, 1891; Trenton, Illinois, U.S.
- Died: August 18, 1946 (age 54); San Diego, California, U.S.
- Occupation: Producer
- Years active: 1926–1946

Tremlet C. Carr (November 6, 1891– August 18, 1946) was an American film producer, closely associated with the low-budget filmmaking of Poverty Row. In 1931 he co-founded Monogram Pictures, which developed into one of the leading specialist producers of B pictures in Hollywood.

In 1935, the company was merged into the newly created Republic Pictures, but a year later, Carr broke away and reestablished Monogram as an independent company. Following his death in 1946, Monogram changed its name to Allied Artists and began producing films made on higher budgets.

Arthur Lubin called him a "charming gentleman" who was offered the chance to be head of MGM but turned it down as "he was a man who liked to play golf, who lived way out in the valley, and had horses. He did not want to work too hard."

== Biography ==
Carr was born in Trenton, Illinois, and attended the University of Illinois. He worked for a construction firm in St. Louis. He moved into the film industry, making a series of short comic features with Al St. John. He and W. Ray Johnston formed Rayart Productions, and Carr worked for him for seven years as vice president. From 1925 to 1930, he was vice president in charge of Syndicate Pictures. From 1928 to 1929, his Trem Carr Productions made 15 films.

In 1931, he helped form Monogram Pictures, becoming vice president in charge of production. (W. Ray Johnston was president.) In 1934, he was elected president of the Independent Motion Pictures Producers Association. In April 1935, Carr and Johnston reorganised Monogram as Republic Pictures. Carr became vice president of Republic Pictures. Carr eventually sold out his interests and produced a series of movies at Universal. Most of his films were "outdoor action pictures." In 1938, he rejoined the board of Monogram.

In 1940, he rejoined Monogram and stayed there until his death. He died of a heart attack while on holiday at the US Grant Hotel in San Diego. He was survived by a wife and a daughter. On Carr's death, Steve Broidy took over as executive in charge of production at Monogram.

== Selected filmography ==
- The Dixie Flyer (1926)
- The Smoke Eaters (1926)
- The Show Girl (1927)
- The Midnight Watch (1927)
- Gun-Hand Garrison (1927)
- Modern Daughters (1927)
- On the Stroke of Twelve (1927)
- Million Dollar Mystery (1927)
- The Divine Sinner (1928)
- Sweet Sixteen (1928)
- The Devil's Tower (1928)
- Trailin' Back (1928)
- The Black Pearl (1928)
- Trail Riders (1928)
- The Painted Trail (1928)
- Mystery Valley (1928)
- Sisters of Eve (1928)
- Should a Girl Marry? (1928)
- The Man from Headquarters (1928)
- The Law and the Man (1928)
- Bride of the Desert (1929)
- Handcuffed (1929)
- The Phantom in the House (1929)
- The Devil's Chaplain (1929)
- Shanghai Rose (1929)
- Some Mother's Boy (1929)
- When Dreams Come True (1929)
- Oklahoma Cyclone (1930)
- Near the Rainbow's End (1930)
- The Rampant Age (1930)
- Second Honeymoon (1930)
- The Nevada Buckaroo (1931)
- Land of Wanted Men (1931)
- Ships of Hate (1931)
- Mother and Son (1931)
- The Montana Kid (1931)
- A Son of the Plains (1931)
- Partners of the Trail (1931)
- In Line of Duty (1931)
- Two Fisted Justice (1931)
- Rider of the Plains (1931)
- Forgotten Women (1931)
- Law of the West (1932)
- Broadway to Cheyenne (1932)
- The Man from Arizona (1932)
- Honor of the Mounted (1932)
- The County Fair (1932)
- Mason of the Mounted (1932)
- Ghost City (1932)
- Single-Handed Sanders (1932)
- Guilty or Not Guilty (1932)
- South of Santa Fe (1932)
- The Arm of the Law (1932)
- Law of the North (1932)
- Son of Oklahoma (1932)
- Hidden Valley (1932)
- Young Blood (1932)
- Breed of the Border (1933)
- He Couldn't Take It (1933)
- Black Beauty (1933)
- The Gallant Fool (1933)
- Galloping Romeo (1933)
- Diamond Trail (1933)
- Broken Dreams (1933)
- West of Singapore (1933)
- The Fugitive (1933)
- The Phantom Broadcast (1933)
- The Avenger (1933)
- Sagebrush Trail (1933)
- Sensation Hunters (1933)
- Manhattan Love Song (1934)
- Flirting with Danger (1934)
- Happy Landing (1934)
- Two Sinners (1935)
- Cappy Ricks Returns (1935)
- Forbidden Heaven (1935)
- Cheers of the Crowd (1935)
- The New Frontier (1935)
- Lawless Range (1935)
- The Keeper of the Bees (1935)
- Make a Million (1935)
- The Mystery Man (1935)
- The Lawless Nineties (1936)
- The Oregon Trail (1936)
- Sea Spoilers (1936)
- Conflict (1936)
- King of the Pecos (1936)
- California Straight Ahead! (1937)
- I Cover the War (1937)
- Idol of the Crowds (1937)
- Adventure's End (1937)
- The 13th Man (1937)
- Atlantic Flight (1937)
- Air Devils (1938)
- Midnight Intruder (1938)
- Prison Break (1938)
- The Singing Outlaw (1938)
- Prairie Justice (1938)
- The Phantom Stage (1939)
- Women in Bondage (1943)
- Lady, Let's Dance (1944)
- Hot Rhythm (1944)
- Partners of the Trail (1944)
- Range Law (1944)
- Allotment Wives / Woman in the Case (1945)
- Divorce (1945)
- Adventures of Kitty O'Day (1945)
- Swing Parade of 1946 (1946)

== Bibliography ==
- Michael R. Pitts. Poverty Row Studios, 1929–1940: An Illustrated History of 55 Independent Film Companies, with a Filmography for Each. McFarland & Company, 2005.
