= Monte Montague =

American actor (1891–1959)

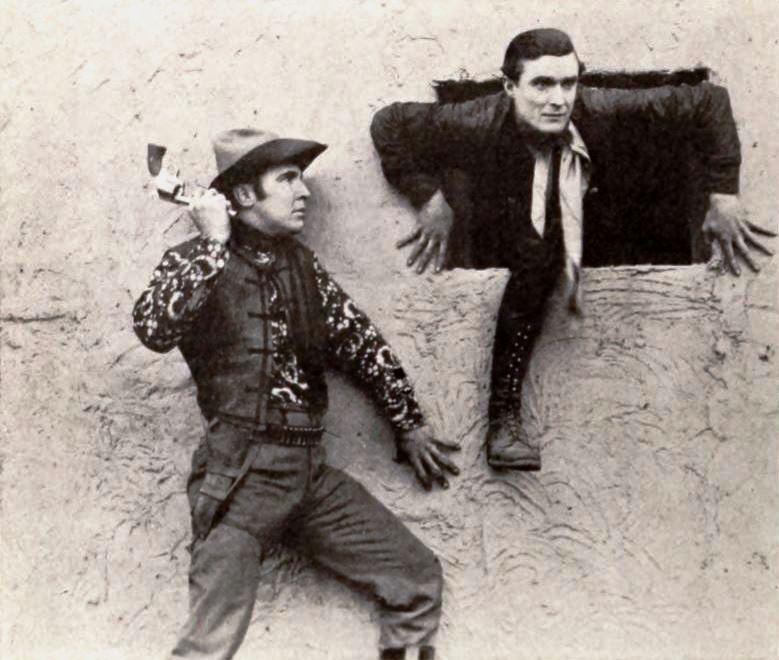
- Montague (left) with Ray Gallagher in 1921 Western short
- Born: Walter Harry Montague; April 23, 1891; Somerset, Kentucky, US
- Died: April 6, 1959 (aged 67); Burbank, California, US
- Occupations: Actor, stunt performer, clown
- Years active: 1901-1954
- Spouse(s): Mary Margaret Basolo (m. 1923)
- Children: Mary Louise Montague (aka Baby Montague)

Walter Harry "Monte" Montague (April 23, 1891 – April 6, 1959) was an American film actor and stuntman. He appeared in more than 190 films between 1920 and 1954.

== Early life ==
Born in Somerset, Kentucky and raised in Cincinnati, Ohio, Montague was one of four children born to Nannie Davis and Oliver H. Montague.

A circus tumbler at age seven, Montague was eventually recognized as among "filmdom's most noted circus clowns", as well as "one of the best screen comedians in the profession." The years preceding his 1920 screen debut featured stints with Ringling Brothers, Hagenbech and Wallace, Barnum and Bailey, Al G. Barnes, Sells Floto, and Cooper and Lentz.

== Personal life and death ==
On February 13, 1923, Montague married Mary Margaret Basolo. They had one child, Mary Louise Montague, who worked briefly as a child actress in films during the 1920s, appearing at least once—billed alternately as "Baby Montague" or "Monte Mongtague Jr."—alongside her father, in 1927's The Rambling Ranger.

Montague died in 1959 at age 67, in Burbank, California, survived by his wife, his mother, his daughter, and all three siblings.

== Partial filmography ==
- Elmo the Fearless (1920)
- The Flaming Disc (1920)
- A Western Demon (1922)
- The Three Buckaroos (1922)
- Peaceful Peters (1922)
- The Great Circus Mystery (1925)
- Ace of Spades (1925)
- The Scarlet Streak (1925)
- The Radio Detective (1926)
- The Mystery Club (1926)
- The Wild Horse Stampede (1926)
- Hey! Hey! Cowboy (1927)
- Range Courage (1927)
- Rough and Ready (1927)
- Blake of Scotland Yard (1927)
- The Noose (1928)
- Clearing the Trail (1928)
- The Price of Fear (1928)
- The Danger Rider (1928)
- King of the Rodeo (1929)
- The Diamond Master (1929)
- The Tip Off (1929)
- The Ace of Scotland Yard (1929)
- Courtin' Wildcats (1929)
- Trigger Tricks (1930)
- The Lonesome Trail (1930)
- The Spell of the Circus (1931)
- The Hawk (1931)
- Finger Prints (1931)
- Heroes of the Flames (1931)
- Quick Trigger Lee (1931)
- Trapped (1931)
- The Shadow of the Eagle (1932)
- Texas Cyclone (1932)
- Impatient Maiden (1932)
- The Vanishing Shadow (1934)
- The Red Rider (1934)
- Rocky Rhodes (1934)
- Song of the Saddle (1936)
- Treachery Rides the Range (1936)
- Tarzan Escapes (1936)
- Guns of the Pecos (1937)
- Riders of the Black Hills (1938)
- Pals of the Saddle (1938)
- The Renegade Ranger (1938)
- Code of the Streets (1939)
- Racketeers of the Range (1939)
- Allegheny Uprising (1939)
- Arizona Legion (1939)
- The Rookie Cop (1939)
- Wagon Train (1940)
- Young Bill Hickok (1940)
- The Apache Kid (1941)
- Man from Cheyenne (1942)
- The Cyclone Kid (1942)
- The Phantom Plainsmen (1942)
- Thundering Hoofs (1942)
- Rustlers (1949)
- The Pecos Pistol (1949)
- The Last Musketeer (1952)
- Calamity Jane (1953)
