= Fools for Luck =

1928 film

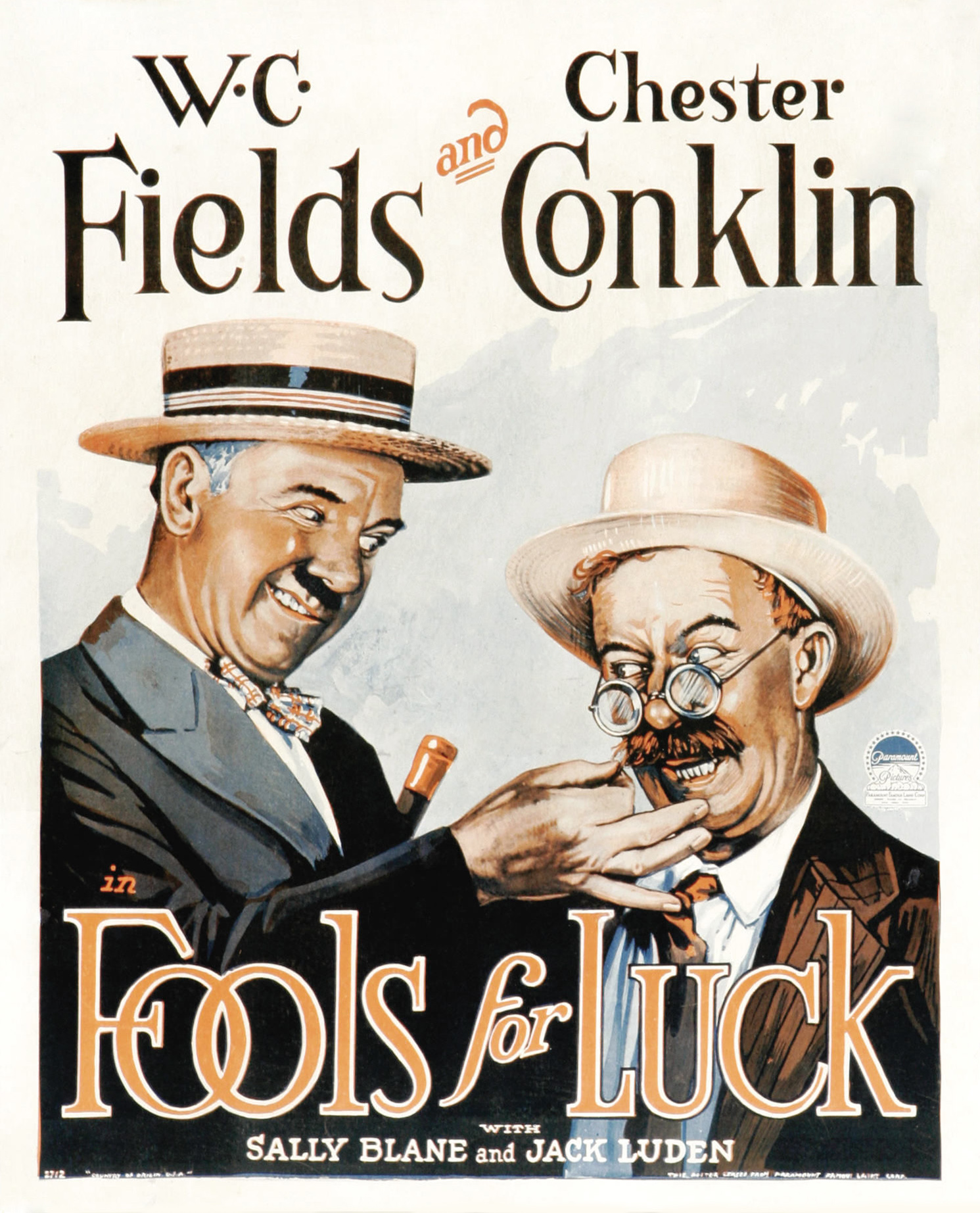
- Theatrical release poster
- Directed by: Charles Reisner
- Screenplay by: Harry Fried; George Marion Jr. Sam Mintz; J. Walter Ruben
- Produced by: Jesse L. Lasky; Adolph Zukor
- Starring: W. C. Fields; Chester Conklin; Sally Blane; Jack Luden; Mary Alden; Arthur Housman; Robert Dudley
- Cinematography: William Marshall
- Edited by: George Nichols Jr.
- Production company: Famous Players–Lasky Corporation
- Distributed by: Paramount Pictures
- Release date: June 11, 1928
- Running time: 59 minutes
- Country: United States
- Language: Silent (English intertitles)

Fools for Luck is a 1928 American silent comedy film directed by Charles Reisner and written by Harry Fried, George Marion Jr., Sam Mintz, and J. Walter Ruben. The film stars W. C. Fields, Chester Conklin, Sally Blane, Jack Luden, Mary Alden, Arthur Housman, and Robert Dudley. The film was released on June 11, 1928, by Paramount Pictures.

A previous Essanay version starred actor Taylor Holmes in 1917.

This is W. C. Fields last silent film.

== Plot ==
Richard Whitehead, a cunning opportunist, strategically adopts a bumpkin persona upon arriving in Huntersville, where Sam Hunter holds influence. Whitehead initially unsettles Hunter by challenging him in a pool match, a subtle prelude to his larger scheme—selling dubious oil field stocks. To add credibility, he recruits Ray Caldwell, a well-meaning but gullible member of a respected local family, whose connection to Hunter's daughter, Louise, further entangles Hunter in the plot.

Hunter, however, refuses to be outmaneuvered. While publicly endorsing the stock, he secretly acquires the legitimate deed to the land and initiates a rumor that oil has been discovered. This calculated move lures Whitehead into repurchasing his own fraudulent stock, believing he is regaining control of a valuable asset. The situation escalates when oil is genuinely struck, turning what seemed like an elaborate con into a high-stakes reversal of fortune. In the end, Whitehead, who manipulated others for profit, finds himself bested by Hunter's own cunning maneuver, highlighting a clever game of deception, power, and unexpected justice.

== Cast ==
- W. C. Fields as Richard Whitehead
- Chester Conklin as Samuel Hunter
- Sally Blane as Louise Hunter
- Jack Luden as Ray Caldwell
- Mary Alden as Mrs. Hunter
- Arthur Housman as Charles Grogan
- Robert Dudley as Jim Simpson
- Martha Mattox as Mrs. Simpson
