= Red Hot Rhythm =

1929 film

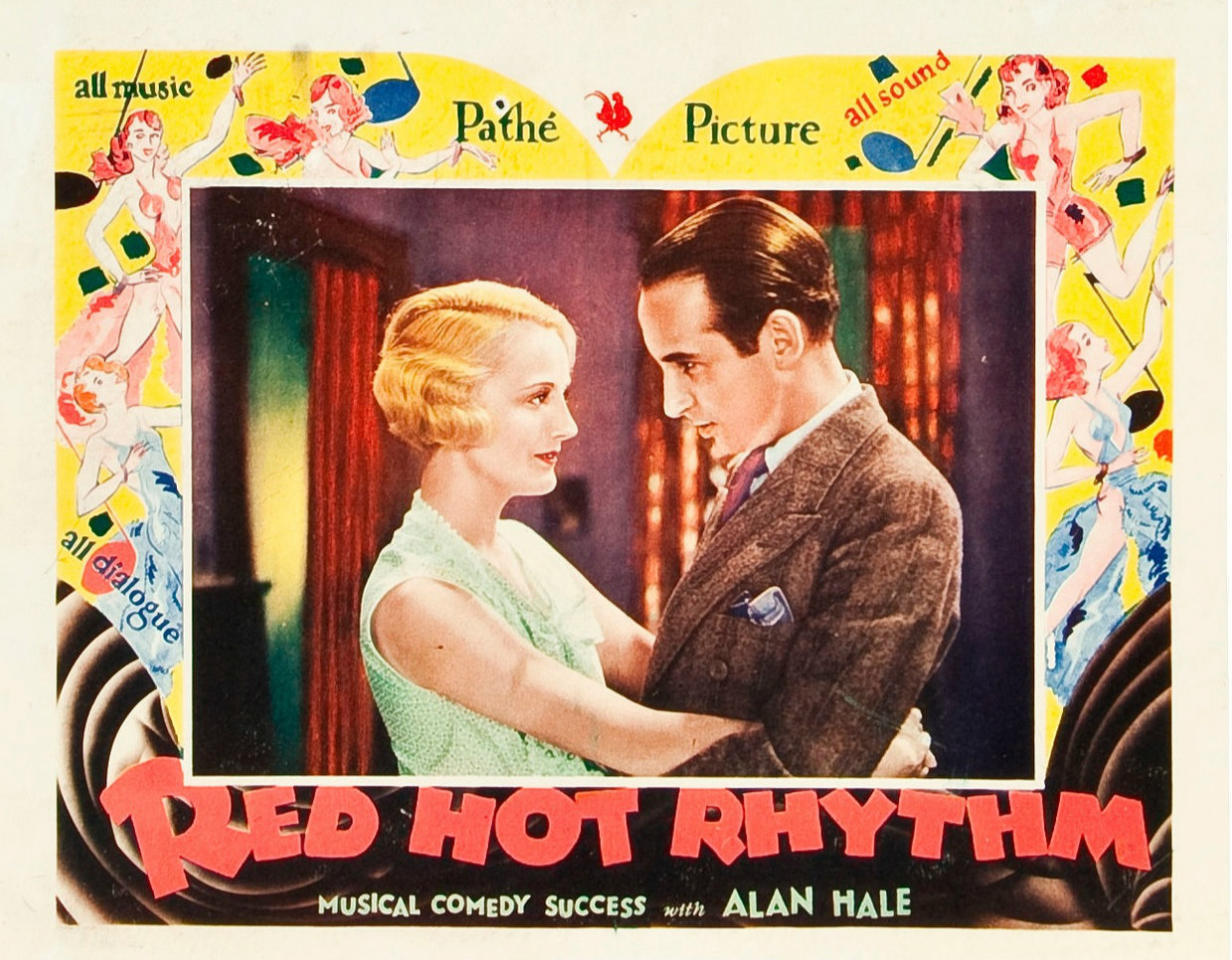
- Lobby card
- Directed by: Leo McCarey
- Produced by: William Conselman; Joseph P. Kennedy
- Starring: Alan Hale Sr. Kathryn Crawford; Walter O'Keefe; Josephine Dunn
- Cinematography: John J. Mescall
- Music by: Josiah Zuro (uncredited)
- Distributed by: Pathé Exchange
- Release date: November 23, 1929
- Running time: 75 minutes
- Country: United States
- Language: English

Red Hot Rhythm (1929) is an American pre-Code early sound musical film directed by Leo McCarey, and starring Alan Hale Sr., Kathryn Crawford, Walter O'Keefe, and Josephine Dunn.

As originally released by Pathé Exchange, the film featured sequences in Multicolor. However the whole film was considered a lost film, except one number in color, the title song that survives.

== Cast ==
- Alan Hale Sr. as Walter
- Kathryn Crawford as Mary
- Walter O'Keefe as Sam
- Josephine Dunn as Claire
- Anita Garvin as Mable
- Ilka Chase as Mrs. Fioretta
- Ernest Hilliard as Eddie Graham
- Harry Bowen as Whiffle
- James Clemens as Singe (credited as Jimmy Clemons)

== Music ==
The film featured six songs ("Red Hot Rhythm," "Out Of The Past," "At Last I'm In Love," "My Idea Of Heaven," "When You're A Part Of Me" and "The Night That Elmer Died") which were all composed by Walter O'Keefe and Robert Emmett Dolan.

== See also ==
- List of early color feature films

== Bibliography ==
The American Film Institute Desk Reference: The Complete Guide to Everything You Need to Know about the Movies
