= Josephine Dunn =

American actress (1906–1983)

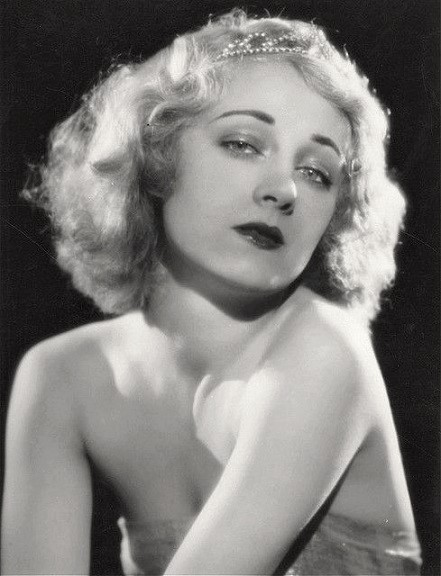
- Dunn in 1930
- Born: Mary Josephine Dunn; May 1, 1906; New York City, U.S.
- Died: February 3, 1983 (aged 76); Thousand Oaks, California, U.S.
- Occupation: Actress
- Years active: 1920–1938
- Spouses: William P. Cameron (m. 1925; div. 1928) Clyde Greathouse (m. 1931; div. 1931) Eugene J. Lewis (m. 1933; div. 1935) Carroll Case (m. 1935; died 1978)

Mary Josephine Dunn (May 1, 1906 – February 3, 1983) was an American stage and film actress of the 1920s and 1930s.

== Early years ==
Dunn was born in New York City and educated at Holy Cross convent school.

== Career ==
At age 14 and a 5 ft 5 in (1.65 m) tall blonde, Dunn started out as a member of the chorus at the Winter Garden Theatre. Her first appearance was in the chorus of "Good Morning Dearie." Rather than return to school she continued in her Broadway career, appearing in almost 20 productions including the Ziegfeld Follies, Between Two Worlds (1934), Take a Chance (1932), Pickwick (1927), Dear Sir (1924), and ending her Broadway run with "Kid Boots."

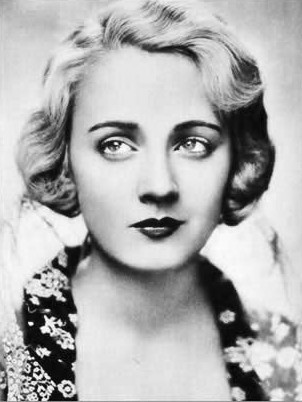
Photoplay, 1930

Dunn visited the Paramount studio with a friend and attended the Paramount Pictures School in 1926 after being discovered there. Her first film role was in Fascinating Youth (1926), which was cast with the school's graduating class. She went on to have the lead roles in Love's Greatest Mistake (1927) and Fireman, Save My Child (1927).

After nine months of inactivity in film, Dunn signed a long-term contract with Metro-Goldwyn-Mayer.

She starred in 23 silent films, and in 1929 she was one of 13 girls named as "WAMPAS Baby Stars", which that year included actress Jean Arthur. In 1930 she made a successful transition, unlike many silent stars, to sound films. In 1930 she starred in Safety in Numbers (1930) alongside Carole Lombard and Kathryn Crawford. She starred in sixteen films through 1932.

== Personal life ==
Dunn married four times. In 1925, she married William P. Cameron in Elkton, Maryland. He was a contracting engineer. They were divorced in 1928. She married Clyde Greathouse, an official of an oil company, in Los Angeles on January 10, 1931, and they were divorced on October 26, 1931. On January 6, 1933, in Great Neck, New York, she married Eugene J. Lewis, whom she divorced in 1935 to marry Carroll Case, whose father Frank Case owned the Algonquin Hotel in New York City, which housed the now famous Algonquin Round Table.

She retired from acting in 1938 and remained with Case until his death in 1978.

== Death ==
Dunn died of cancer on February 3, 1983, in Thousand Oaks, California, aged 76.

== Partial filmography ==
- Fascinating Youth (1926)
- It's the Old Army Game (1926)
- The Sorrows of Satan (1926)
- Love's Greatest Mistake (1927)
- Fireman, Save My Child (1927)
- With Love and Hisses (1927)
- Swim Girl, Swim (1927)
- She's a Sheik (1927)
- Get Your Man (1927)
- Excess Baggage (1928)
- The Singing Fool (1928)
- We Americans (1928)
- A Million for Love (1928)
- All At Sea (1929)
- Sin Sister (1929)
- China Bound (1929)
- A Man's Man (1929)
- Black Magic (1929)
- Melody Lane (1929)
- Our Modern Maidens (1929)
- Red Hot Rhythm (1929)
- Big Time (1929)
- Safety in Numbers (1930)
- Madonna of the Streets (1930)
- Second Honeymoon (1930)
- Two Kinds of Women (1932)
- Murder at Dawn (1932)
- Forbidden Company (1932)
- Between Fighting Men (1932)
- One Hour With You (1932)
- Big City Blues (1932) as Jackie DeVoe (uncredited)
- The Fighting Gentleman (1932)
- Murder in the Library (1933)
