= Jack Luden =

American film and television actor

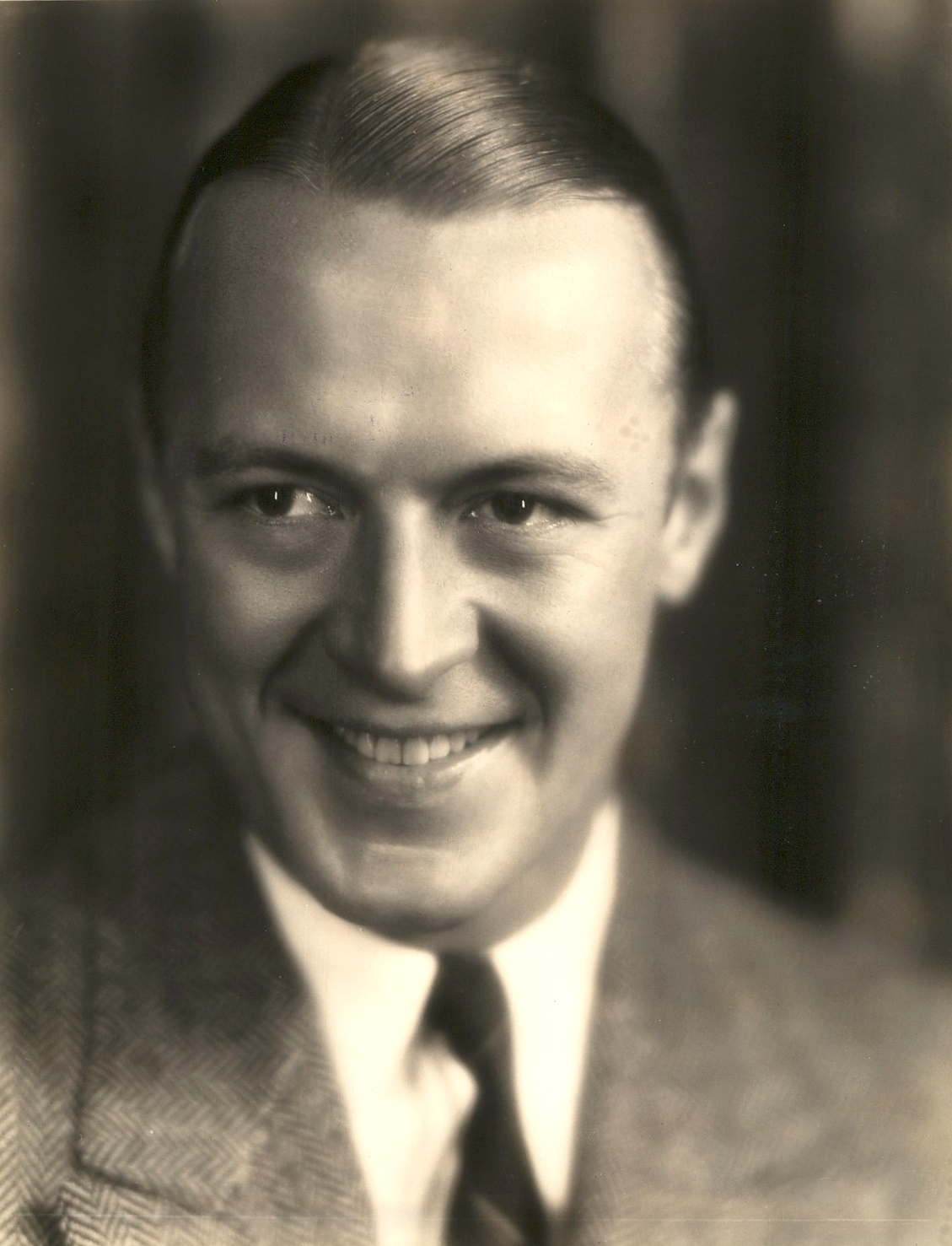
- Luden c. 1929
- Born: Jacob Benson Luden; February 8, 1902
- Died: February 15, 1951 (aged 49); San Quentin, California, U.S.
- Education: New York Military Academy
- Occupation: Film actor
- Relatives: William H. Luden (uncle)

Jacob Benson Luden (February 8, 1902 – February 15, 1951) was an American film actor.

== Early life ==
The son of Jacob and Anna Luden, he grew up in Reading, Pennsylvania. His uncle was confectioner William H. Luden, who developed the menthol cough drop. His passion as a young man had been athletics. While studying at the New York Military Academy, he had participated in trials for the 1920 Summer Olympics. During the trials, he broke his leg, preventing him from pursuing an athletic career.

== Film career ==
In 1925, Luden joined the Paramount Pictures School, a newly established acting school founded by the Famous Players–Lasky Corporation. There were 17 other members of the school when it opened, including Charles "Buddy" Rogers and Thelma Todd. The work of the school's students was highlighted in the 1926 film Fascinating Youth. In October 1926, the number of students at the school was reduced to six; Luden was one of the actors who remained.

After his time at the school, Luden had an initially successful career. After appearing in a number of FBO Pictures Corporation short films, he played major roles in a series of silent feature films produced by Paramount Pictures. This included appearing as the lead actor in the 1927 Western Shootin' Irons.

Within a year, his career began to decline, and he was relegated to smaller supporting roles. His speech impediment made him a less desirable choice when Paramount increasingly produced sound films. His roles included Young Eagles (1930).

In the late 1930s, Luden appeared in a series of low-budget Westerns produced by Columbia Pictures. These were commercially unsuccessful, and Luden's acting career ended.

== Later life ==
In 1950, he was convicted for issuing checks with insufficient funds and for possessing heroin, and imprisoned in San Quentin State Prison in San Quentin, California. He died there the following year, at the age of 49.

== Partial filmography ==
- It's the Old Army Game (1926)
- The Jade Cup (1926)
- The Last Outlaw (1927)
- Tell It to Sweeney (1927)
- Aflame in the Sky (1927)
- Two Flaming Youths (1927)
- Shootin' Irons (1927)
- Under the Tonto Rim (1928)
- Partners in Crime (1928)
- Fools for Luck (1928)
- Forgotten Faces (1928)
- The Woman from Moscow (1928)
- Sins of the Fathers (1928)
- The Wild Party (1929)
- Innocents of Paris (1929)
- Why Bring That Up? (1929)
- Young Eagles (1930)
- Suicide Squad (1935)
- Rolling Caravans (1938)
- Pioneer Trail (1938)
- Phantom Gold (1938)
- Susannah of the Mounties (1939)
- Bordertown Trail (1944)
