= A Man's Man =

A Man's Man may refer to:

- A Man's Man (1918 film)
- A Man's Man (1929 film)
