= Ricardo Montalbán Theatre =

Theatre in Hollywood, opened 1927

Coordinates: 34°6′1.1″N 118°19′36.7″W

Montalbán Theatre
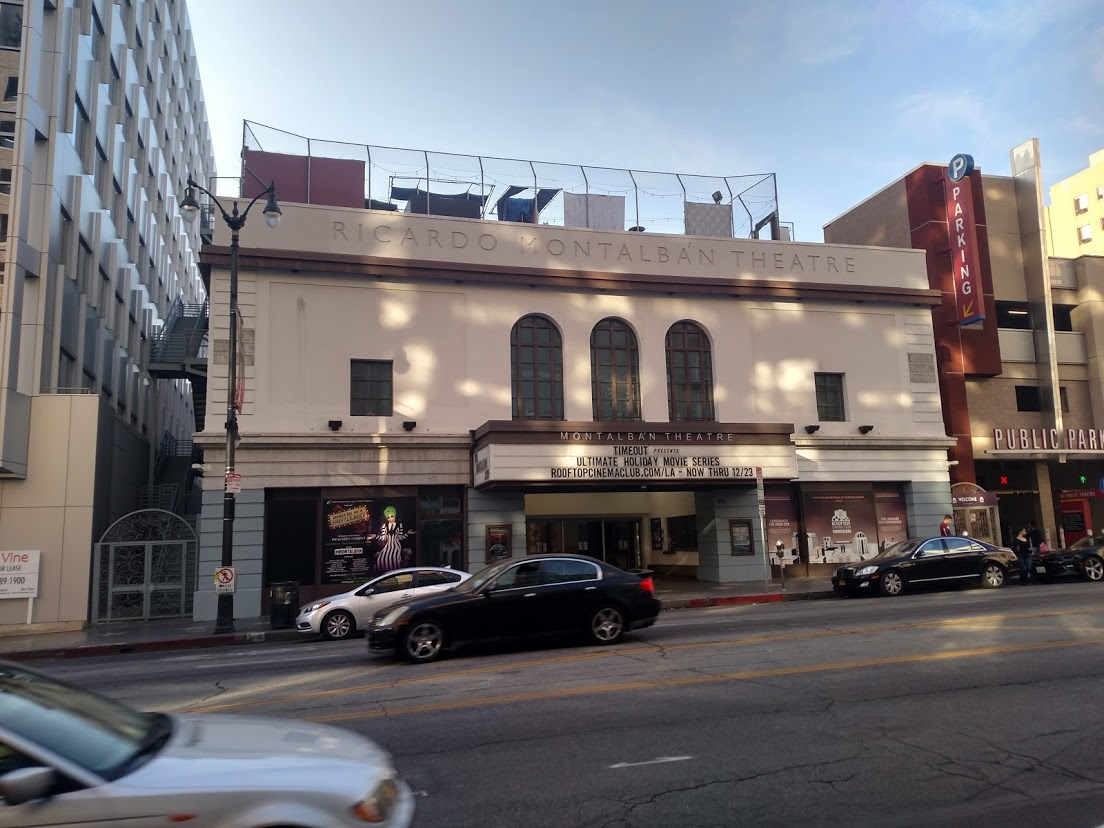
- Interactive map of Montalbán Theatre
- Full name: Ricardo Montalbán Theatre
- Former names: Wilkes Vine Street Theatre (1927); Vine Street Theatre (1927–31); Mirror Theatre (1931–33); Studio Theatre (1933–36); CBS Radio Playhouse (1936–54); Huntington Hartford Theatre (1954–64); Doolittle Theatre (1974–2004)
- Address: 1615 Vine St. Los Angeles, California 90028-8802
- Location: Hollywood, California
- Capacity: 962

Construction
- Opened: January 19, 1927
- Architects: Myron Hunt; H.C. Chambers
- Builder: The Wilkes Brothers

Website
- Venue Website

Ricardo Montalbán Theatre, usually referred to as The Montalbán, formerly known as the Wilkes' Vine Street Theatre, Mirror Theatre, Studio Theatre, CBS Radio Playhouse, Huntington Hartford Theatre, and Doolittle Theatre, is a theater in the Hollywood section of Los Angeles.

== History ==
The theatre is located near the intersection of Hollywood and Vine, on Vine Street between Hollywood Boulevard and Sunset Boulevard, at the site of the former Robert Northam / Jacob Stern estate. The Beaux-Arts building was designed by architects Myron Hunt and H.C. Chambers and constructed in 1926–27. Seating 1,200 at the time, it was the first Broadway-style legitimate theater venue in Los Angeles.

It opened January 19, 1927, under the name Wilkes' Vine Street Theatre. The first production was Patrick Kearney's adaption of Dreiser's An American Tragedy, which had opened on Broadway in 1926. Other productions mounted at the theatre included Philadelphia.

In March 1931, the theater was converted to a movie theater, under the name Mirror Theatre, part of a chain run by Howard Hughes and Harold B. Franklin. That company soon fell apart, and by the mid 1930s, the theatre was operating under the name Studio Theatre.

CBS bought the theatre in 1936 and converted it to a live performance radio auditorium and radio studio for local affiliate KNX, under the name CBS Radio Playhouse. CBS's Lux Radio Theatre moved there from New York that year (because of this, some sources give the theatre's name as Lux Radio Playhouse). This popular anthology show featured radio adaptations of stage plays and film scripts performed by well-known actors in front of a live audience; Cecil B. DeMille was for many years its producer and host. The theatre was also the home of the Al Jolson show from 1936 to 1939 .

A&P heir and arts patron Huntington Hartford bought the theatre from CBS in 1953, modernized it with design by Helen Conway, and re-opened it with 970 seats as the first legitimate theatre venue in Los Angeles in many years, under the name Huntington Hartford Theatre. The premiere production of the Hartford was What Every Woman Knows starring Helen Hayes. Hartford ran the theater successfully for ten years, with high-profile productions featuring the biggest stars of the era.

After ten years, Hartford lost interest in patronizing the arts in Los Angeles, and in 1964, the theatre was sold to James Doolittle, operator of the Greek Theatre (who outbid Cary Grant), and was later renamed the Doolittle Theatre. Doolittle ran the theatre successfully for 20 years, after which it was acquired by UCLA.

In 1999, the Nosotros Foundation bought the theatre, which had been closed and fallen somewhat into disrepair. In May 2004, the venue re-opened as the Ricardo Montalbán Theatre. One goal of the new theater was specifically to promote Latino stage productions.

Although the foundation encountered some financial difficulties, and struggled to fully renovate the theatre to achieve and maintain profitability, the theatre has successfully remained open. Film festivals, art galleries, and other programs are hosted, and there are rooftop film screenings in the spring and summer. The theater does not stage its own productions, and instead serves as a rental venue for traveling productions.

Productions staged at The Montalbán have included Zorro in Hell (2007), An Evening Without Monty Python (2009), the enra show PROXIMA (2016), and the first live show by the band The New Basement Tapes with Johnny Depp and Haim.

In 2009, the venue entered an agreement with Nike, Inc. for various concessions: a mini Nike retail store in the back of the orchestra section, Nike logos at the mezzanine level and lobby, a retail display case in front of the theater's main entrance, and rental to Nike for promotional film screenings during which the theatre would operate under the name Nike Sportswear at the Montalbán. This occasioned some criticism. An officer of the Nosotros theater company described the situation as "a mixed bag. Artists aren't happy about it but, at the same time, Nike is helping the theater to pay its bills".

== In film ==
The theatre plays a prominent role, identified as the Huntington Hartford, in the 1963 film The Yellow Canary. Singer Pat Boone portrays a pop star, and performs numerous songs during two concerts held there.

The exterior and adjacent parking lot featured as the "Burlesque Lounge" theatre in the 2010 film Burlesque with Cher and Christina Aguilera.
