= Fascinating =

Fascination may refer to:

== Film and television ==
- Fascinating Youth, a 1926 comedy film directed by Sam Wood.

== Music ==
- Fascinating Rhythm, a 1924 song by George Gershwin
- Fascinating (song), a 1989 single for Carol Kenyon
