= Kathryn Crawford =

American actress (1908–1980)

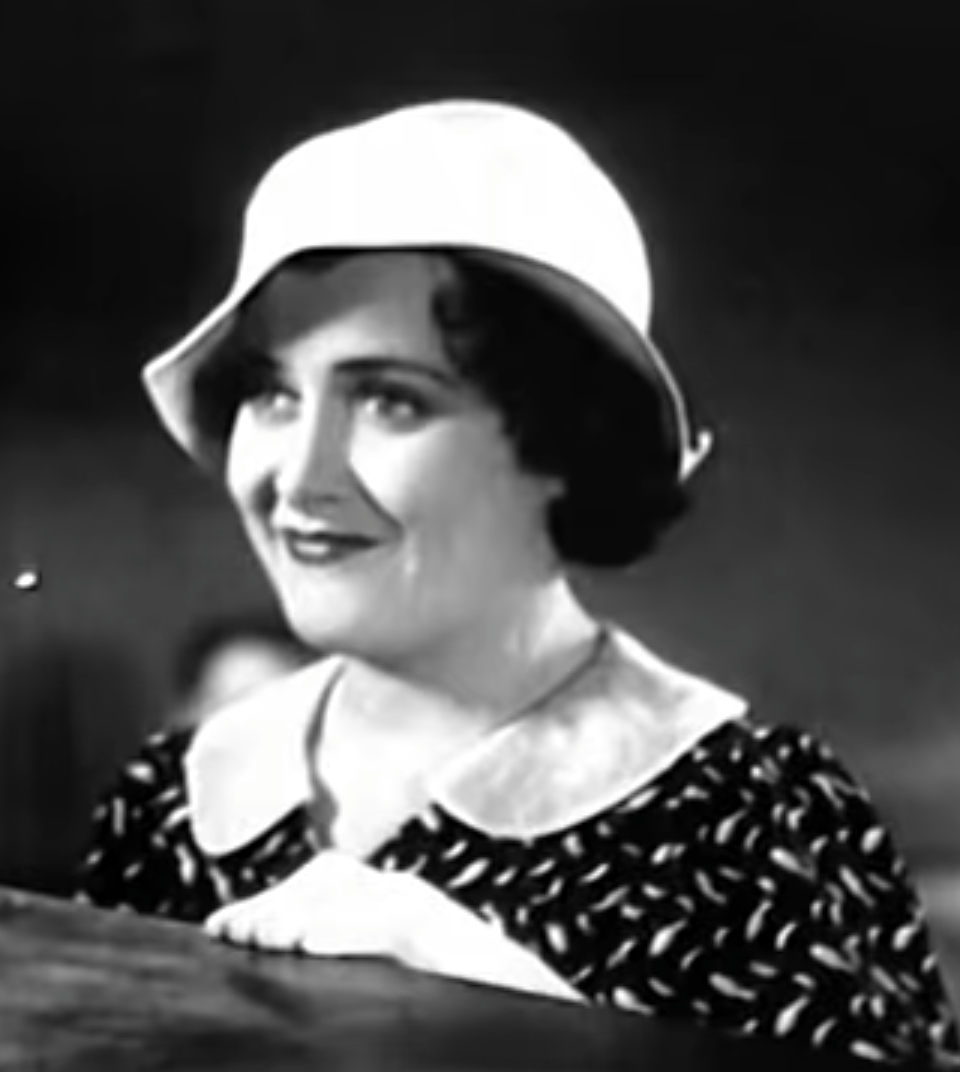
- Crawford in Skyway (1933)
- Born: Kathryn Moran; October 5, 1908; Wellsboro, Pennsylvania, U.S.
- Died: December 7, 1980 (aged 72); Pasadena, California, U.S.
- Occupation: Actress
- Years active: 1928–1941
- Spouses: Max Rogers (m. 1926; ann. 1926) James Edgar Jr. (m. 1934; div. 1936) Ralph M. Parsons (m. 1970; died 1974)

Kathryn Crawford (nee Moran; October 5, 1908 – December 7, 1980) was an American film and theatre actress of the 1920s and 1930s. She was also known as Katherine Crawford and Kitty Moran.

== Early years ==
Born in Wellsboro, Pennsylvania, Crawford was the daughter of Michael and Ann Scott (Rusling) Moran. Her father worked in a glass factory. Her parents divorced when Crawford was 5 years old, and she did not see her mother again for nearly four decades.

Soon after Crawford's mother fell ill, her father moved the family to Los Angeles. She didn't get along with her stepmother, and at the age of 15, Crawford eloped with her sister's boyfriend to get out of the house. After a year and a half of marriage, the two separated. Her mother, who later remarried and was working as a hotel maid, searched 12 years for her daughters and found them after she saw Kathryn in a movie magazine in 1929.

Crawford first ventured into singing when she joined the choir at St. Stephen's Episcopal Church of Huntington Park while she was a high school student. The choir director gave her vocal lessons to improve her singing.

== Career ==
Crawford worked as a shop assistant for some time but was determined to make use of her singing voice and decided to pursue musical comedy. Her first acting opportunity came in Lillian Albertson's production of The Love Call. She began performing in summer stock jobs across the Pacific Coast until she got her big break as the ingenue in the play Hit the Deck. The play was successful, and she attracted the attention of director Wesley Ruggles, who gave her a screen test that won her a contract with Universal Pictures.

Crawford starred in her first film in 1929 when she appeared opposite Hoot Gibson in King of the Rodeo. She starred in seven films that year, and in 1930, she appeared in another six films, including Safety in Numbers (1930) alongside Carole Lombard and up and coming actress and "WAMPAS Baby Star" Josephine Dunn.

Her only starring role on Broadway was in the Cole Porter musical The New Yorkers in which she was the original singer of "Love for Sale". The song was controversial because it was "sung from the perspective of a Prohibition-era prostitute." Ted Gioia wrote in the book The Jazz Standards: A Guide to the Repertoire, "audience outrage subsided after the Broadway production shifted the setting of the song to Harlem, in front of the Cotton Club, and assigned the number to African-American vocalist Elisabeth Welch instead of Kathryn Crawford, a white singer." However, by 1931 her career had cooled. She starred in only one film that year and three from 1932 to 1933, only one of which was a lead role.

Crawford's final acting part came in 1941 when she was credited under the name "Katherine Crawford" in City of Missing Girls, and which starred H. B. Warner and John Archer. She retired from acting after that film, and moved to Pasadena, California.

== Personal life ==
Crawford's initial marriage, when she eloped, was to Max Rogers, a student at UCLA. They were married by a justice of the peace in Riverside and continued their high school and college educations. Crawford later said "He didn't trust me, and I didn't trust him." Crawford had the marriage annulled when she was 18.

On November 10, 1934, she married James Edgar, Jr., in Detroit, Michigan, and retired from the screen. They divorced (with much publicity) on June 16, 1936.

On December 28, 1970, in Los Angeles, Crawford married Ralph M. Parsons, the engineering construction magnate, with whom she remained married until his death in 1974.

In her later years, Crawford was an interior decorator for 40 years. Her clients included Barron Hilton (at Hilton's Jay Paley House), Douglas MacArthur, Herbert Hoover, and Mary Pickford's Pickfair estate.

Civic activities in which Crawford was active included Friends of Harvey Mudd College, Los Angeles Music Center, the Blue Ribbon 400, the Society for Preservation of Variety Arts, the Los Angeles County Museum, and the Society of American Interior Designers.

== Death ==
Crawford died of cancer at the Las Encinas Hospital in Pasadena, California on December 7, 1980. She was aged 72.

== Newspaper reports ==
- St Joseph Gazette: 12-year search for girls ends, June 3, 1929
- Los Angeles Times: Actress' Mother in Court Today, February 2, 1931.
