= Love's Greatest Mistake =

1927 film by A. Edward Sutherland

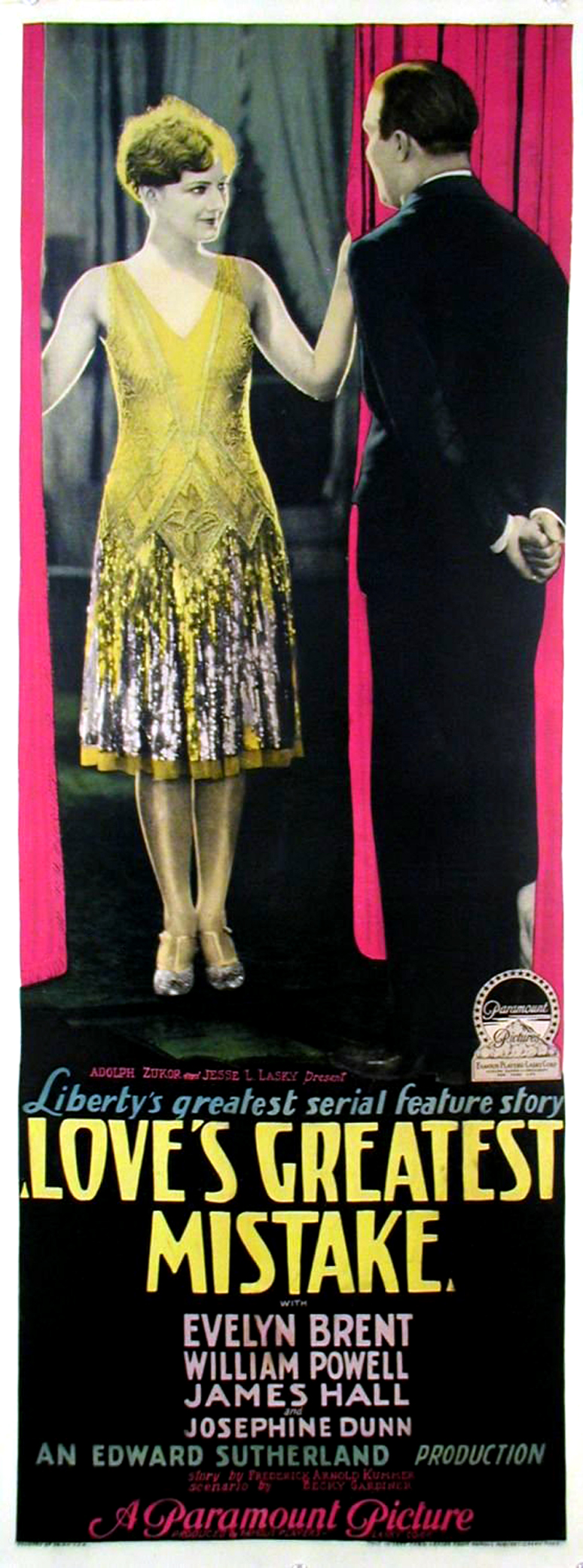
- Film poster
- Directed by: A. Edward Sutherland
- Written by: Becky Gardiner
- Story by: Frederic Arnold Kummer
- Produced by: William LeBaron
- Starring: Evelyn Brent
- Cinematography: Leo Tover
- Distributed by: Paramount Pictures
- Release date: February 20, 1927
- Running time: 60 minutes
- Country: United States
- Language: Silent (English intertitles)

Love's Greatest Mistake is a 1927 American silent drama film directed by A. Edward Sutherland and starring Evelyn Brent. The film is now lost.

== Plot ==
Honey McNeil comes to New York expecting to have a rather dull time under her sister's chaperonage. But when she walks in on her sister clasped in the arms of a man who isn't her husband, Honey complacently adopts the new standard, and plays around with the rich banker she has met on the train, to the distress of her poorer, but more sincere sweetheart, who naturally mistrusts the really innocent friendship. This is Love's greatest mistake—lack of faith.

The banker writes more or less incriminating letters, which Don Kendall seeks to obtain from Honey for blackmail purposes, but Honey has successfully hidden them. She saves the letters, though she goes to the hospital as a result of her encounter with Don.

Foiled of his prey, Don gives out a story to a tabloid and then arranges to elope with the sister. Honey, coming home to the empty flat, out of step with a sweetheart who clumsily offers to marry her “in spite of all,” turns to the banker, but changes her mind just in time and marries the right man.

== Cast ==
- Evelyn Brent as Jane
- William Powell as Don Kendall
- James Hall as Harvey Gibbs
- Josephine Dunn as Honey McNeil
- Frank Morgan as William Ogden
- Iris Gray as Sara Foote
- Betty Byrne as Lovey Gibbs
