= Skyway (film) =

1933 film by Lewis D. Collins

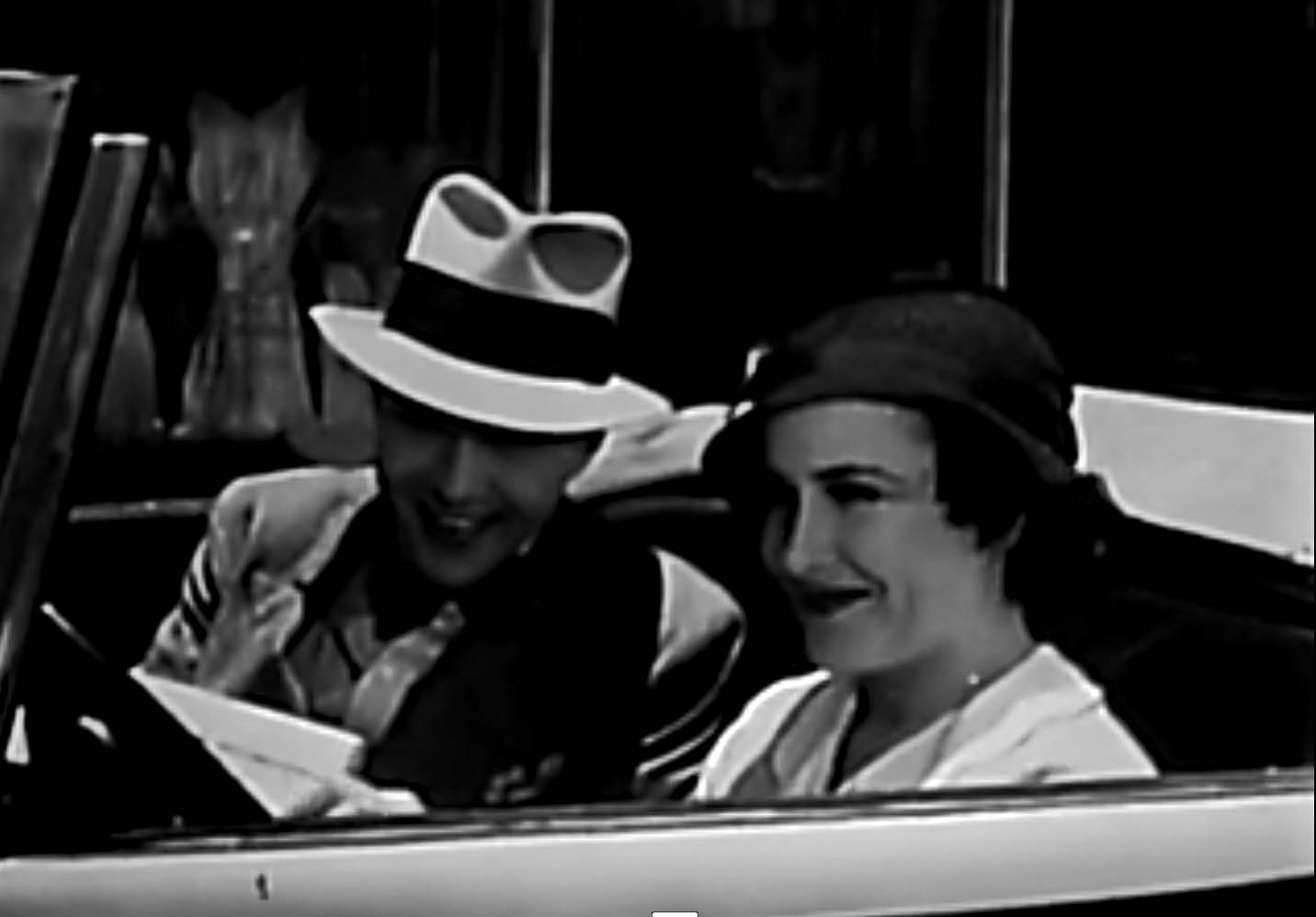
- Ray Walker and Kathryn Crawford in Skyway (1931)
- Directed by: Lewis D. Collins
- Written by: Albert DeMond (screenplay); Paul B. Franklin (story)
- Produced by: William T. Lackey (producer)
- Cinematography: Charles Edgar Schoenbaum
- Edited by: Carl Pierson
- Release date: August 30, 1933
- Running time: 70 minutes
- Country: United States
- Language: English

Skyway is a 1933 American Pre-Code romantic comedy film directed by Lewis D. Collins.

== Plot ==
Pilot "Flash" Norris is always getting into trouble with his fists, and his quick temper. His girl, Lila, tries to get him to simmer down; and, convinces her father to give him a job in his bank. When the bank won’t invest in his old friend, George Taylor’s airline, Flash quits the bank.

But, when money goes missing, from the bank, it’s up to Flash to prove his innocence, recover the money, and catch up with the bank’s Vice President Baker and his girlfriend Mazie, before their ship takes them to a jurisdiction, without an extradition treaty. Lila doesn’t give up hope, waiting for Flash, and her ship to come in.

== Cast ==
- Ray Walker as Robert "Flash" Norris
- Kathryn Crawford as Lila Beaumont
- Arthur Vinton as John Hamilton
- Claude Gillingwater as John Beaumont
- Lucien Littlefield as Webster
- Tom Dugan as Tug
- Jed Prouty as Calvin Baker
- Alice Lake as Mazie
- George "Gabby" Hayes as George Taylor
- Edmund Cobb as Pilot Fredericks
