= Fast Company (1929 film) =

1929 film by A. Edward Sutherland

- Directed by: A. Edward Sutherland
- Written by: Walton Butterfield; Patrick Kearney; Joseph L. Mankiewicz; Florence Ryerson
- Based on: Elmer The Great; 1928 play by George M. Cohan; Ring Lardner
- Starring: Jack Oakie; Evelyn Brent
- Cinematography: Edward Cronjager
- Edited by: Jane Loring
- Distributed by: Paramount Pictures
- Release date: September 14, 1929
- Running time: 70 minutes
- Country: United States
- Language: English

Fast Company is a 1929 American Pre-Code sports comedy film directed by A. Edward Sutherland and starring Jack Oakie and Evelyn Brent. It is based upon the 1928 play Elmer the Great by George M. Cohan and Ring Lardner. According to the Internet Movie Database, the UCLA Film & Television Archive has reels 1, 2, and 3 of this film, with reel 4 having disintegrated in 1990.

== Plot ==
Egomaniacal baseball slugger Elmer Kane is not only good, he enjoys telling everybody how good he is. A professional scout, Bert Wade, takes an interest in Elmer, who in turn takes an interest in Evelyn Corey, an attractive actress.

Wade cons the ballplayer into thinking the actress is falling for him, which inspires a home run from Elmer to win the big game.

== Cast ==
- Evelyn Brent as Evelyn Corey
- Jack Oakie as Elmer Kane
- Richard 'Skeets' Gallagher as Bert Wade
- Sam Hardy as Dave Walker
- Arthur Housman as Barney Barlow
- Gwen Lee as Rosie La Clerq
- Chester Conklin as C. of C. President
- E. H. Calvert as Platt
- Eugenie Besserer as Mrs. Kane
- Bert Rome as Hank Gordon

== Music ==
The film features a theme song entitled "You Want Lovin' (But I Want Love)" which was composed by Sam Coslow, Larry Spier and Jack Osterman. Also featured on the soundtrack is a song entitled "I Want A Good Time Bad" which was composed by Sam Coslow. During the party sequence in the film, Sam Coslow plays both of the songs on the piano and sings them while being accompanied by the Paramount orchestra offscreen.

== See also ==
- List of baseball films
- List of partially lost films
- List of early sound feature films (1926–1929)
