= Tell It to Sweeney =

1927 film

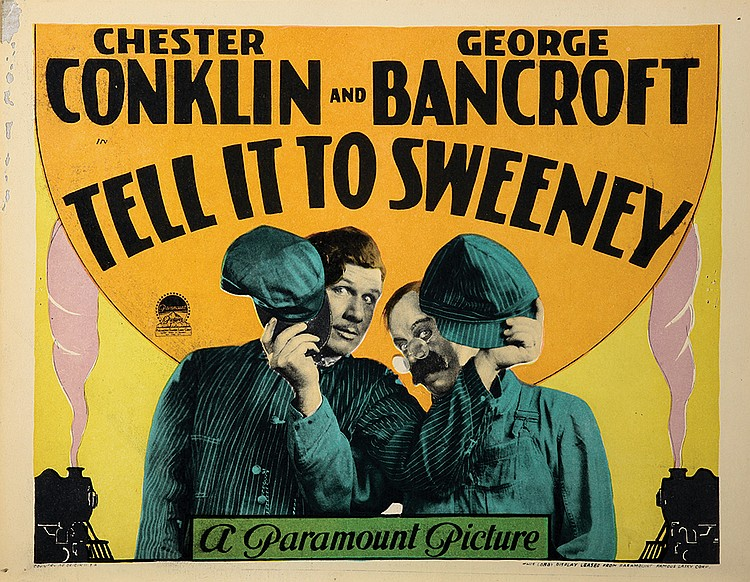
- Lobby card
- Directed by: Gregory La Cava
- Screenplay by: Kerry Clarke; George Marion Jr.
- Story by: Percy Heath; Monte Brice
- Produced by: Gregory La Cava; Jesse L. Lasky; Adolph Zukor; B. P. Schulberg
- Starring: Chester Conklin; George Bancroft; Jack Luden; Doris Hill
- Cinematography: H. Kinley Martin
- Production company: Famous Players–Lasky Corporation
- Distributed by: Paramount Pictures
- Release date: September 24, 1927
- Running time: 60 minutes
- Country: United States
- Language: Silent (English intertitles)

Tell It to Sweeney is a 1927 American silent comedy film directed by Gregory La Cava and written by Monte Brice, Kerry Clarke, George Marion Jr., and Percy Heath. The film stars Chester Conklin, George Bancroft, Jack Luden, Doris Hill, Frank Bond, and William H. Tooker. The film was released on September 24, 1927, by Paramount Pictures.

== Cast ==
- Chester Conklin as Luke Beamish
- George Bancroft as Cannonball Casey
- Jack Luden as Jack Sweeney
- Doris Hill as Doris Beamish
- Frank Bond as Supt. Dugan
- William H. Tooker as Old Man Sweeney

== Preservation ==
A print of Tell It to Sweeney is in the Gosfilmofond collection in Moscow.
