= It's the Old Army Game =

1926 film by A. Edward Sutherland

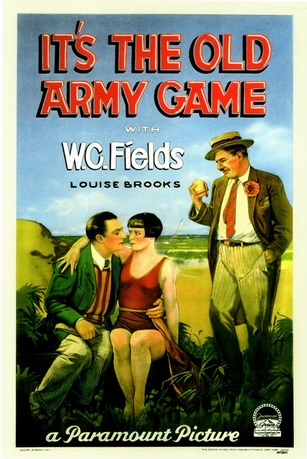
- Film poster
- Directed by: Eddie Sutherland
- Written by: Thomas J. Geraghty (scenario); J. Clarkson Miller (scenario)
- Story by: Joseph P. McEvoy; William LeBaron
- Based on: The Comic Supplement by Joseph P. McEvoy
- Produced by: Adolph Zukor; Jesse L. Lasky; William LeBaron (associate producer)
- Starring: W. C. Fields; Louise Brooks
- Cinematography: Alvin Wyckoff
- Edited by: Thomas J. Geraghty
- Production company: Famous Players–Lasky
- Distributed by: Paramount Pictures
- Release date: May 24, 1926 (US)
- Running time: 1 hour, 17 minutes
- Country: United States
- Language: Silent (English intertitles)

It's the Old Army Game (full film)

It's the Old Army Game is a 1926 American silent comedy film starring W. C. Fields and Louise Brooks. The film was directed by Eddie Sutherland and co-stars Sutherland's aunt, the stage actress Blanche Ring in one of her few silent film appearances. The film is based on the revue The Comic Supplement by Joseph P. McEvoy and Fields, and included several skits from Fields' stage plays. The "army game" in the title is in reference to a shell game, a confidence trick which Fields’ character observes being played. "It's the old army game," he says, sagely.

Large sections of the film, including the "picnic" and "sleeping on the porch" scenes, were incorporated into Fields' classic talkie film It's a Gift (1934).

== Plot ==
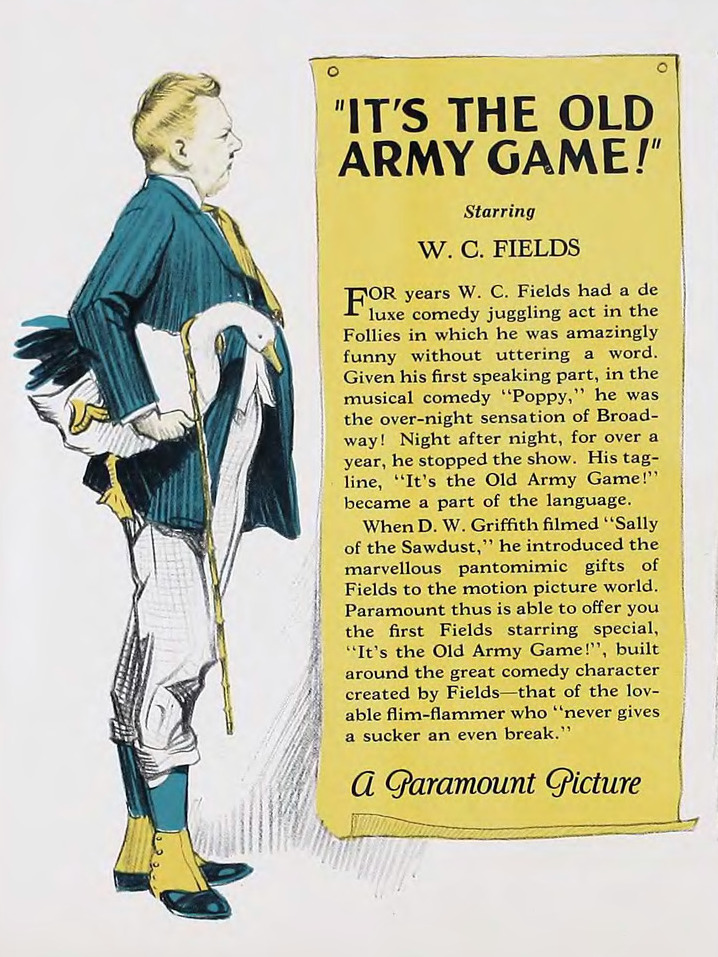
It's the Old Army Game 1925 advertisement

Elmer Prettywillie is a small town druggist/general store owner whose customers are eccentric at best and rude and demanding at worst. They include a man who wants "a nice, clean two-cent stamp" from the center of a massive sheet of them.

Prettywillie' sole joy is his pretty clerk, but not her homely maiden aunt, who has an unrequited crush on him. Attempting to sleep on an outdoor back porch, Prettywillie is disturbed by a series of noisy peddlers, including a surly ice man who insists Prettywillie heft his own heavy, rapidly melting block of ice. A neighbor then insists Prettywillie watch her bratty baby; whom Prettywillie cheerfully attempts to smother to stop its crying. The baby eventually gets hold of a large mallet and knows exactly what to do with it. Prettywillie ends up destroying the back porch when he accidentally discharges a shotgun.

Later, Prettywillie and family stage a picnic on the front lawn of a private estate, and order the owner of the house to clean up their unholy, paper-strewn mess.

Real estate hustler William Parker arrives in town and becomes smitten with Marshall. Marshall talks Prettywillie into letting Parker sell real estate out of the store. When New York City police arrive and take Parker away in connection with a previous "bad deal", Prettywillie is left to face the wrath of the investors.

Prettywillie makes a quick trip to New York City, hoping to locate Parker. Not used to city traffic, he drives the wrong way on a one-way street and has various parts of his car sheared off. He hires a mule to pull the car. The mule refuses to budge. Prettywillie tries to give the mule a hot foot, and only succeeds in burning up what's left of the car.

Returning home in defeat, Prettywillie gives himself up at the police station, but he learns a developer has re-bought the lots at a high price, enriching the town and making him a hero. When the maiden aunt arrives, Prettywillie locks her in a cell and makes a hasty retreat. Meanwhile, Parker and Marshall have eloped on a train.

== Cast ==
- W. C. Fields as Elmer Prettywillie
- Louise Brooks as Marilyn Marshall
- Blanche Ring as Tessie Overholt
- William Gaxton as William Parker
- Mary Foy as Sarah Pancoast
- Mickey Bennett as Mickey
- Josephine Dunn as Society Bather
- Jack Luden as Society Bather
- George Currie as Artist
- Elise Cavanna as Nearsighted woman (uncredited)
- John Merton as Fireman (uncredited)
- Rose Elliott (uncredited)

== Production ==
The film was shot mainly at Paramount's Astoria Studios facility in Astoria, Queens, and in Manhattan, and is preserved complete in the Library of Congress. A few outdoor scenes were filmed in Ocala, Florida, and Palm Beach, Florida. Behind schedule at the time, the picnic sequence was shot on the lawn of El Mirasol, a Palm Beach mansion owned by Wall Street investment banker Edward T. Stotesbury.

On April 13, 1926, while shooting a scene at Steinway Gardens at the edge of Flushing Bay, New York City, in which a Ford automobile driven by Fields was to go through a papier-mâché "breakaway" wall parallel to an embankment and then turn up the road, the automobile instead went through the wall and down the embankment to the shore of the bay. While no one was seriously injured, Fields and passengers Blanche Ring, Mary Foy, and Mickey Bennett received minor bruises.

A 2018 DVD release, 75 minutes long, contains a newly written organ music score played by noted silent film restorist Ben Model.
