= Elise Cavanna =

American actress and dancer (1902–1963)

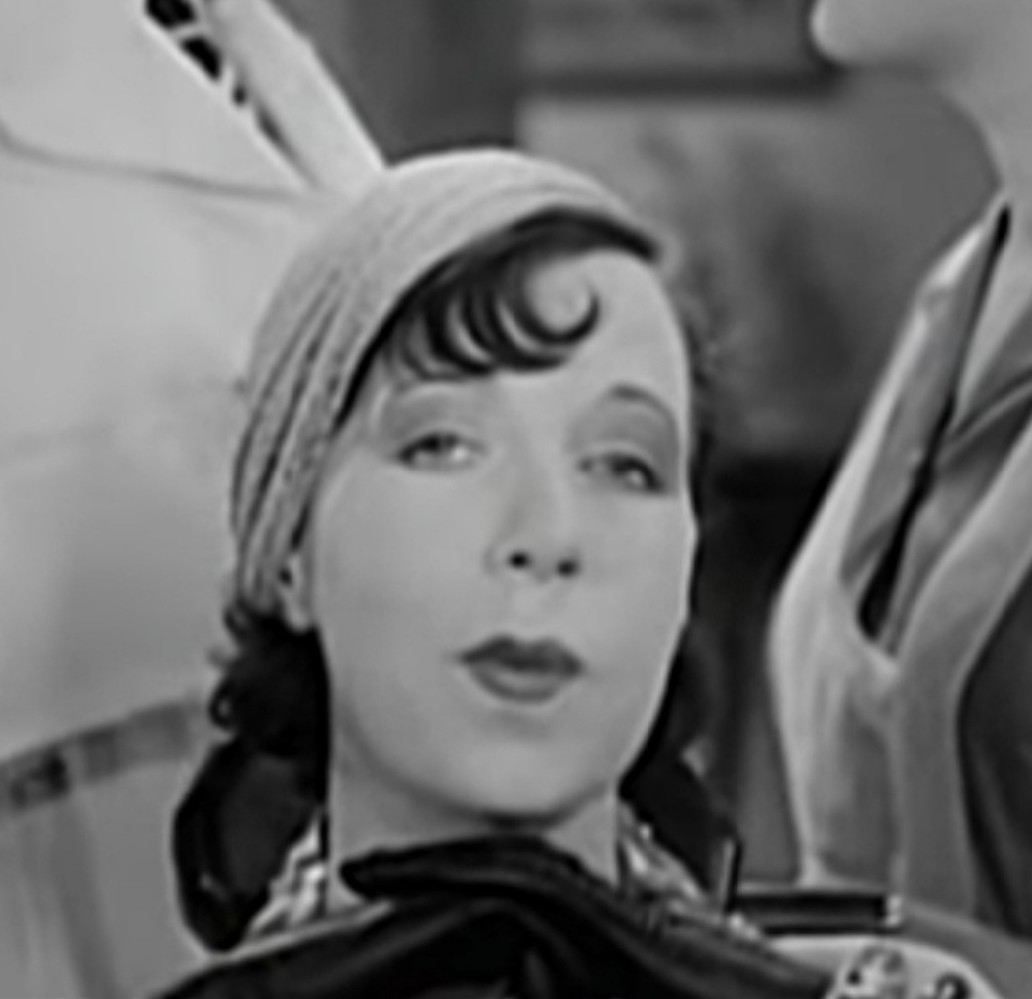
- Cavanna in The Dentist (1932)
- Born: Elise Alyse Seeds; January 30, 1902; Philadelphia, Pennsylvania, U.S.
- Died: May 12, 1963 (aged 61); Hollywood, California, U.S.
- Resting place: Forest Lawn Memorial Park, Glendale, California
- Other names: Elise Armitage; Elise Welton
- Occupations: Actress; comedian; dancer; artist
- Years active: 1926–1945
- Spouses: Merle Armitage (m. 1932, divorced) James Welton (divorced)

Elise Alyse Cavanna (born Elise Alyse Seeds; January 30, 1902 – May 12, 1963) was an American film actress, stage comedian, dancer, and fine artist. She went by the following names: Elise Seeds, Alyse Seeds, Elise Armitage, Elise Cavanna, and Elise Welton.

== Stage and film career ==
She was born Elise Alyse Seeds in Germantown, Philadelphia, to Sally D. Burk and Thomas M. Seeds. She attended the Pennsylvania Academy and studied dancing with Isadora Duncan in Berlin, Germany. Cavanna was 6 feet tall and very svelte. She gave dance recitals in New York City, but grew dissatisfied and instead became a dancer in the Ziegfeld Follies.

Cavanna was a comedian with Joe Weber and Lew Fields before she entered motion pictures in 1926. Her first film was Love 'Em and Leave 'Em (1926) with Louise Brooks and Evelyn Brent. Next she performed as an "early morning customer" with Brooks and W.C. Fields in It's the Old Army Game (1926). She worked with Fields in four other of his films, most notably The Dentist, where her scenes as a writhing victim of the brutal dentist (Fields) were deemed so risque that they were edited out for television broadcast decades later. Her on-screen interplay with Fields was compared by film historian William K. Everson to that between Groucho Marx and Margaret Dumont. Cavanna remained in films until the late 1930s, compiling more than twenty screen credits.

In 1932, while living in Los Angeles, she met and married Merle Armitage (1893–1975), a writer, book designer, musician, and WPA administrator. She became more interested in visual art and art social circles after her marriage.

== Art ==
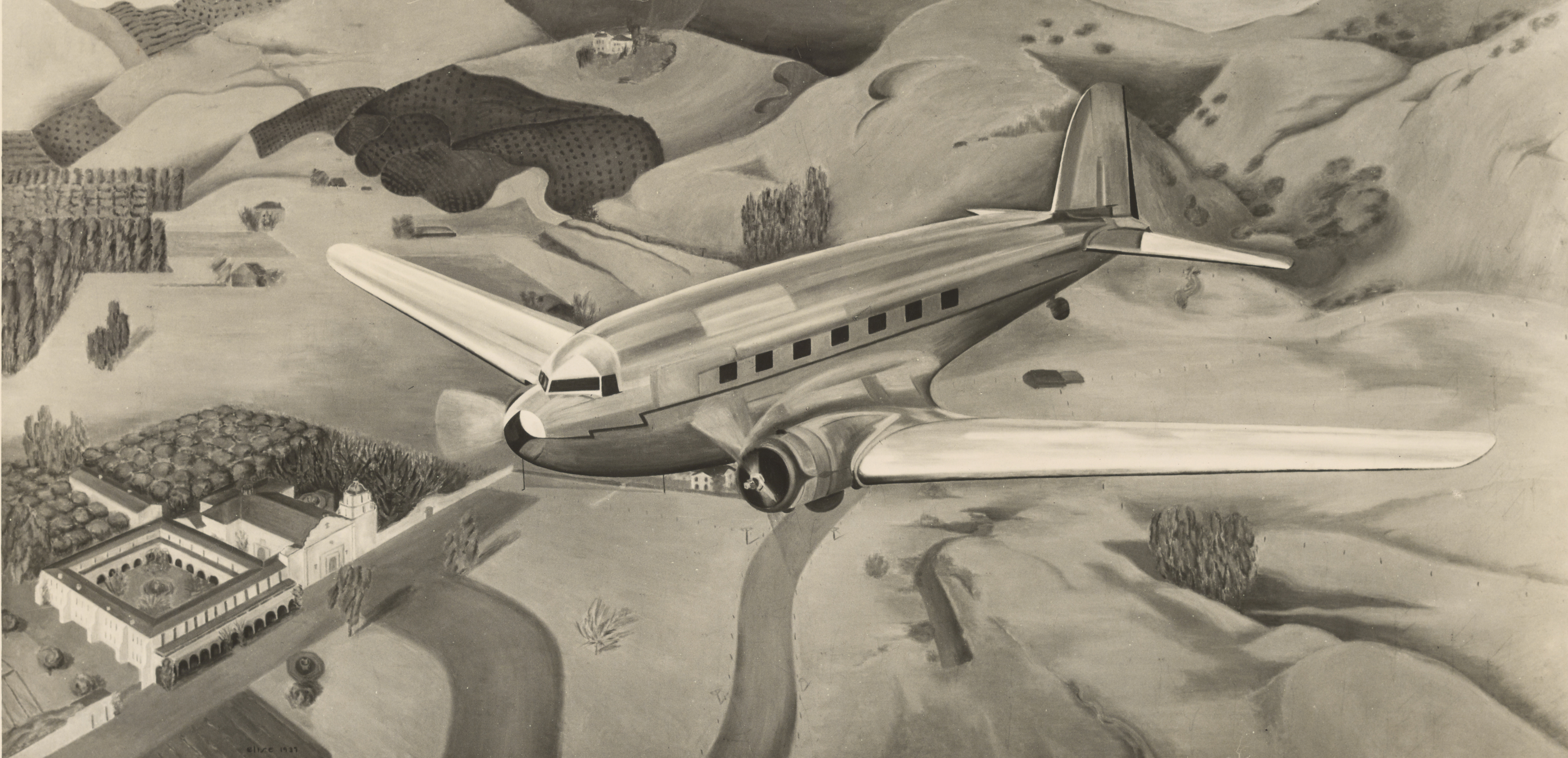
Air Mail (1937), mural for the post office in Oceanside, California

In September 1933, Cavanna presented six abstract lithographs at a showing at Stendhals in Los Angeles, California. A newspaper review commented on the "cool precision of her lines and spots of tone." The art was best appreciated through the "mind's eye" rather than the eye itself. Cavanna's art was shown in October 1949 as part of the contemporary section in the California Centennials Exhibition of Art at the Los Angeles County Museum, Exposition Park. Oils, water colors, and prints from 20th-century artists were presented along with a historical section, which assembled early art. It displayed life in California from 1800 through 1870.

In 1937, Cavanna completed the 16′ x 6′ oil-on-canvas painting Air Mail for the Oceanside, California, post office. The painting depicts a realistic but stylized airplane flying over a landscape that looks similar to California.

The Los Angeles Art Association exhibited Cavanna's work in a 1954 showing at 2425 Wilshire Boulevard. The four artists whose work was shown were known collectively as Functionists West. They were Stephen Longstreet, Helen Lundeberg, Cavanna, and Lorser Feitelson. By then the former actress signed her name simply, Elise. Cavanna and Feitelson presented only nonobjective paintings, though each worked in representational modes. Both artists were similar in "using only flat-colored, near geometrical forms", which either opposed or complemented each other. Cavanna was one of the first nonobjective painters in southern California. Each one of her pictures was brightly colored, filled with energy, and could be viewed as a separate portion of a frieze. Feitelson and Lundeberg wrote a manifesto in 1934, describing their art as post-surrealism. Their desire was to use art to communicate the connection between the conceptual and the perceptual.

== Later years and death ==
In 1961 Cavanna and her husband James Welton co-authored the book Gourmet Cookery for a Low Fat Diet, which contains 200 recipes for making fatless meals.

Elise Cavanna Welton, at age 61, died of cancer in Hollywood, California, on May 12, 1963. Her gravesite is located at Forest Lawn Memorial Park in Glendale, California.

== Filmography ==
| Year | Title | Role | Notes |
|---|---|---|---|
| 1926 | Love 'Em and Leave 'Em | Miss Gimple | |
| 1926 | It's the Old Army Game | Near-sighted woman | Uncredited |
| 1931 | A Melon-Drama | | Alternative title: Broadway Headliners: A Melon-Drama |
| 1932 | The Dentist | Patient (Miss Mason) | |
| 1933 | Infernal Machine | Bit Role | Uncredited |
| 1933 | The Pharmacist | Mrs. Dilweg | Alternative title: The Druggist |
| 1933 | The Big Fibber | | |
| 1933 | The Barber Shop | Mrs. O'Hare | |
| 1933 | Beauty for Sale | Hat Saleslady | Uncredited |
| 1933 | Static | Radio Store Customer | Uncredited |
| 1933 | Day of Reckoning | Gertie | Uncredited |
| 1934 | Hips, Hips, Hooray! | Miss Pilot, Radio Announcer | Uncredited |
| 1934 | You're Telling Me! | Sarah Smith, female gossip | Uncredited |
| 1934 | Have a Heart | Genevieve, the Pianist | Uncredited |
| 1935 | Times Square Lady | Hosiery Saleslady | Uncredited |
| 1935 | Air Hawks | First Nurse | Uncredited |
| 1935 | I Dream Too Much | Darcy's Secretary | Uncredited |
| 1936 | Old Hutch | Travel Agency Clerk | Uncredited |
| 1938 | Everybody Sing | Colvin's Music Teacher | Uncredited |
| 1938 | Having Wonderful Time | Office Supervisor | Uncredited |
| 1938 | Three Loves Has Nancy | Third Woman on Autograph Line | Uncredited |
| 1939 | Naughty But Nice | Pansey, Hardwick Maid | Uncredited |
| 1946 | Ziegfeld Follies | Tall Woman | Uncredited |
