= Patrick Kearney (playwright) =

American playwright (1893–1933)

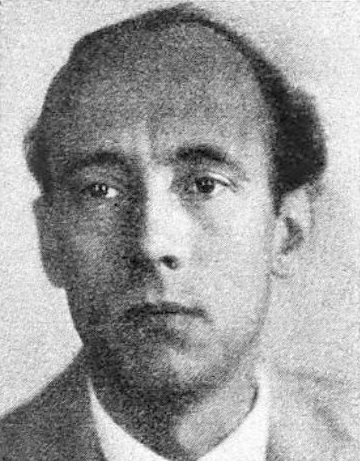
- Born: October 9, 1893; Columbus, Ohio, United States
- Died: March 28, 1933 (aged 39); New York City, New York, United States
- Occupations: Playwright, actor
- Spouse: Elizabeth
- Children: Monica and Deirdre
- Parent: Alfred Kearney

Patrick Kearney (October 9, 1893 – March 28, 1933) was an American playwright.

== Biography ==
Patrick Kearney was born in Columbus, Ohio on October 9, 1893. He started in the theatre as an actor. His first Broadway play as a playwright was the comedy A Man's Man which was moderately successful, opening on October 12, 1925, and running into January of the next year, with 120 performances. It was made into a 1929 silent film of the same name, now lost.

Theodore Dreiser and Horace Liveright chose Kearney to write the stage adaption of Dreiser's novel An American Tragedy, and Kearney did so. The play (of the same title), featuring Morgan Farley and Miriam Hopkins, had a successful run on Broadway at the Longacre Theatre in the 1926–1927 season. In 1927, the play initiated Los Angeles's legitimate theatre scene as the premier production of Wilkes' Vine Street Theatre (now the Ricardo Montalbán Theatre). An American Tragedy had a Broadway revival in 1931 at the Waldorf Theatre.

Kearney's play of An American Tragedy was adapted (not by Kearney) into the 1951 film A Place in the Sun starring Elizabeth Taylor and Montgomery Clift, according to a screen credit acknowledging the play as a source. Elizabeth Coons and Deirdre Kearney Rose, Patrick Kearney's widow and daughter, filed a 1959 lawsuit against Paramount Pictures requesting an injunction restraining the distribution of the film. Paramount countered that, the onscreen credit notwithstanding, the film was based solely on Dreiser's novel. (The disposition of the lawsuit is not available, but it's noteworthy that the papers of the film's director, George Stevens, housed at the Margaret Herrick Library, contain both a copy of Kearney's play and a document comparing the dramatic elements of the novel, the play, and several screenplay adaptations by various writers during the preparation of the film.) The film won the 1951 Academy Award for Best Adapted Screenplay.

Kearney's next Broadway play was also an adaption, Elmer Gantry. It opened at the Playhouse Theatre in 1928 starring Edward Pawley and was not a success. His next Broadway production was the original comedy Old Man Murphy which he wrote with Harry Wagstaff Gribble. It played at the Royale, then the Fulton, then after a hiatus at the Hudson; it ran for 112 performances and was later adapted into the 1935 film His Family Tree. Kearney's final Broadway play was also an original comedy, A Regular Guy, which opened off-season at the Hudson, and which he also directed. It flopped.

Kearney also did some film screenwriting, working (with other writers) on the films Darkened Rooms, Fast Company (1929), and Doomed Battalion (1932).

== Personal life ==
Kearney's father was Alfred Kearney. He had two daughters, Monica and Deirdre. Kearney's wife was named Elizabeth (later Elizabeth Coons after her remarriage to businessman Sheldon Coons, who raised Dierdre). Despondent over the failure of his later plays and the consequent financial losses, Kearney killed himself in his rooming house by inhaling gas through a tube in New York on March 28, 1933, at the age of 39. His body was found by a policeman who had been called to the home by the owner after she detected an unpleasant odor emanating from the room. The owner stated that Kearney had lost approximately $250,000 over the last two years. Kearney's friends also said he had been despondent due to the loss of investments and the fact that two recent plays had failed to find producers on Broadway.

Kearney's sister, Elizabeth Kearney Coakley, met Theodore Dreiser at Kearney's funeral and became his secretary, protégé, and friend, and worked with Dreiser on adapting some of his short stories to the screen.
