= Safety in Numbers (1930 film) =

1930 film by Victor Schertzinger

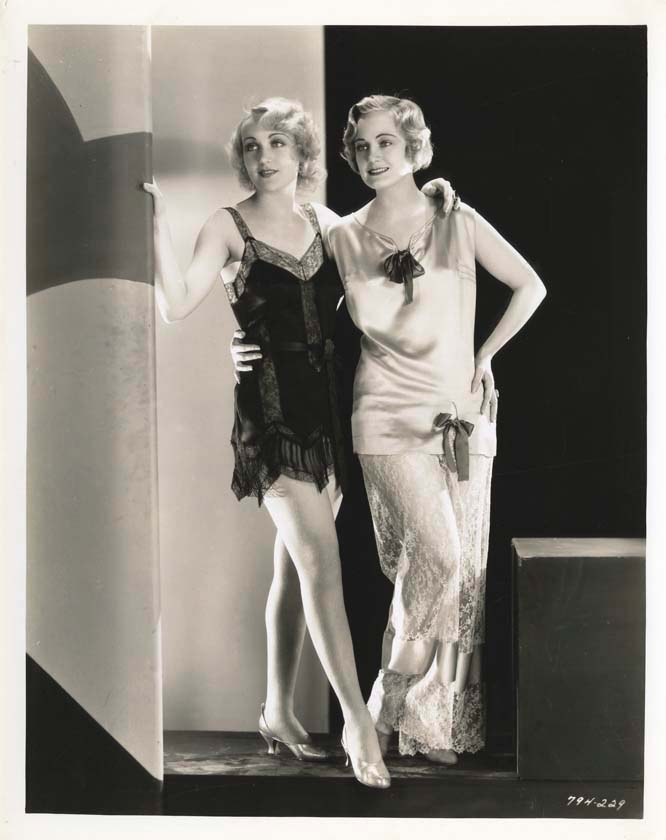
- Still with Carole Lombard and Josephine Dunn
- Directed by: Victor Schertzinger
- Written by: George Marion Jr. Percy Heath
- Story by: Marion Dix
- Starring: Charles "Buddy" Rogers; Kathryn Crawford; Josephine Dunn; Carole Lombard
- Cinematography: Henry W. Gerrard
- Music by: Richard A. Whiting; George Marion Jr.
- Production company: Paramount Pictures
- Release date: May 30, 1930
- Running time: 60 minutes
- Country: United States
- Language: English

Safety in Numbers is a 1930 American pre-Code musical comedy film. Directed by Victor Schertzinger, it stars Charles "Buddy" Rogers, and features Kathryn Crawford, Josephine Dunn, and Carole Lombard (in an early role).

== Plot ==
Safety in Numbers (1930)

William Reynolds is set to inherit $350 million on his next birthday, but his uncle says he must learn the ways of the world beforehand. His uncle hires three "Follies girls" to guide William around New York.

== Cast ==
- Charles "Buddy" Rogers as William Butler Reynolds
- Kathryn Crawford as Jacqueline
- Josephine Dunn as Maxine
- Carole Lombard as Pauline
- Roscoe Karns as Bertram Shapiro
- Richard Tucker as F. Carstair Reynolds
- Francis McDonald as Phil Kemptom
- Raoul Paoli as Jules
- Virginia Bruce as Alma McGregor
- Geneva Mitchell as Cleo Carewe
- Louise Beavers as Messalina
- Lawrence Grant as Commander Brinker (uncredited)
- Tom London as Motorist (uncredited)
- Russ Powell as Doorman (uncredited)
- Charles Sullivan as Taxicab Driver (uncredited)

== Reception ==
The reviewer for the Motion Picture Herald wrote, "Here's that rare combination of intelligent direction, brilliant dialogue, and rich humor. The result is a picture that is entertainment plus." Mordaunt Hall of The New York Times was less enthusiastic, but praised the musical numbers.
