= Parsons Corporation =

American technology-focused engineering firm

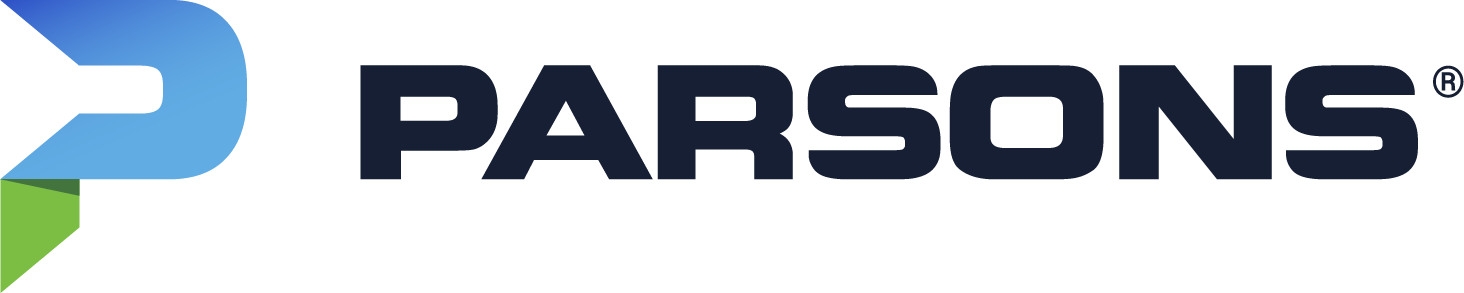

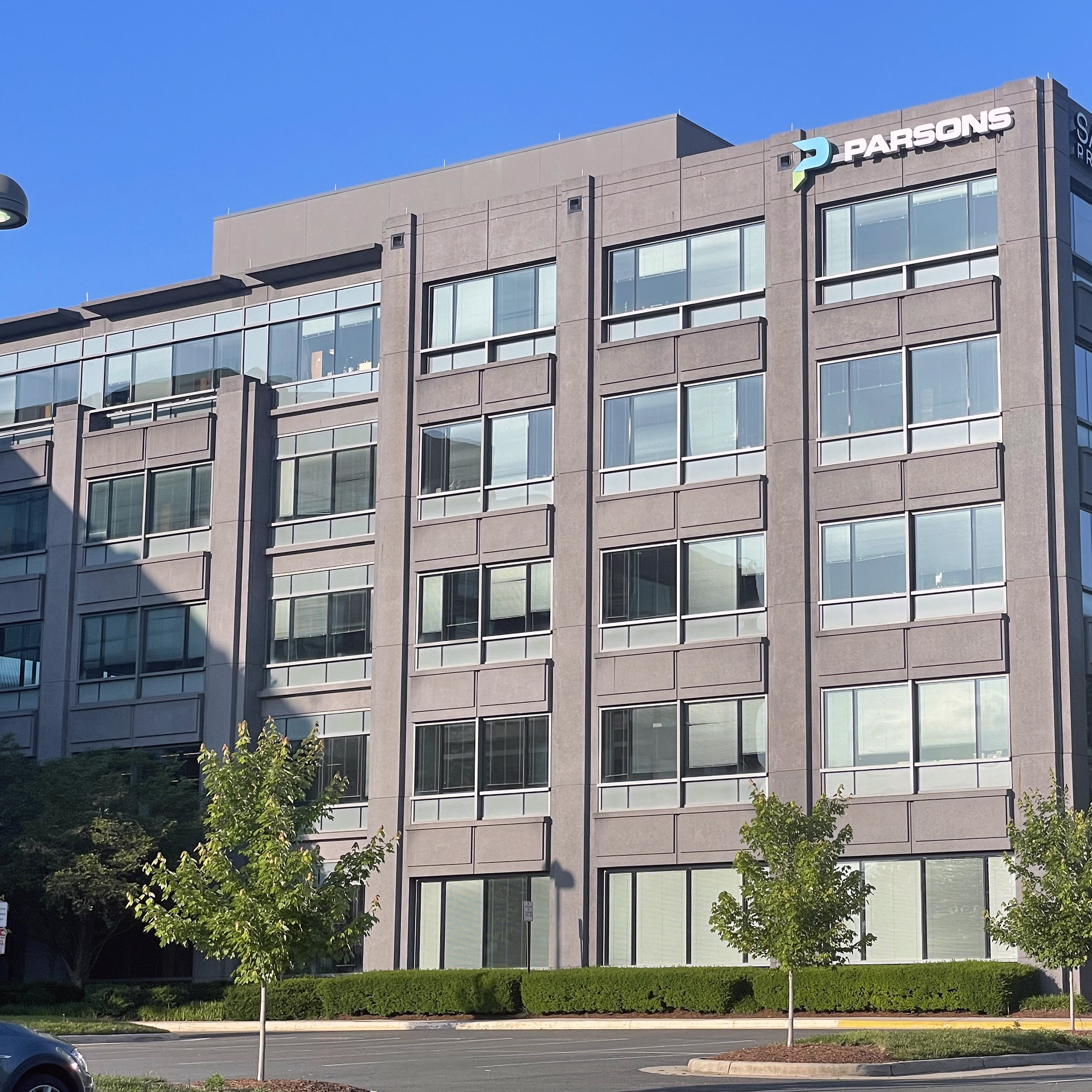
- Parsons headquarters in Chantilly, Virginia
- Type: Public
- Traded as: NYSE: PSN; S&P 400 component
- Industry: Security; Defense; Intelligence; Technology; Critical Infrastructure
- Founded: 1944; 82 years ago in California, United States (as Ralph M. Parsons Company)
- Founder: Ralph M. Parsons
- Headquarters: Chantilly, Virginia, U.S.
- Area served: Worldwide
- Key people: Carey Smith (CEO, chair and president)
- Revenue: ▼US$6.4 billion (2025)
- Operating income: ▼US$418 million (2025)
- Net income: ▲US$241.1 million (2025)
- Total assets: ▲US$5.77 billion (2025)
- Total equity: ▲US$2.77 billion (2025)
- Number of employees: 21,000 (2025)
- Website: parsons.com

Parsons Corporation is an American multinational technology-focused defense, intelligence, and infrastructure engineering firm. Founded in 1944, Parsons is headquartered in Chantilly, Virginia, and serves both government and private sector organizations in more than 30 countries.

Parsons became a public company after its initial public offering (IPO) in 2019. It was included in the Fortune 1000 in 2020 and added to the S&P 400 in 2024. As of late 2025, Parsons employs over 21,000 professionals worldwide.

== History ==
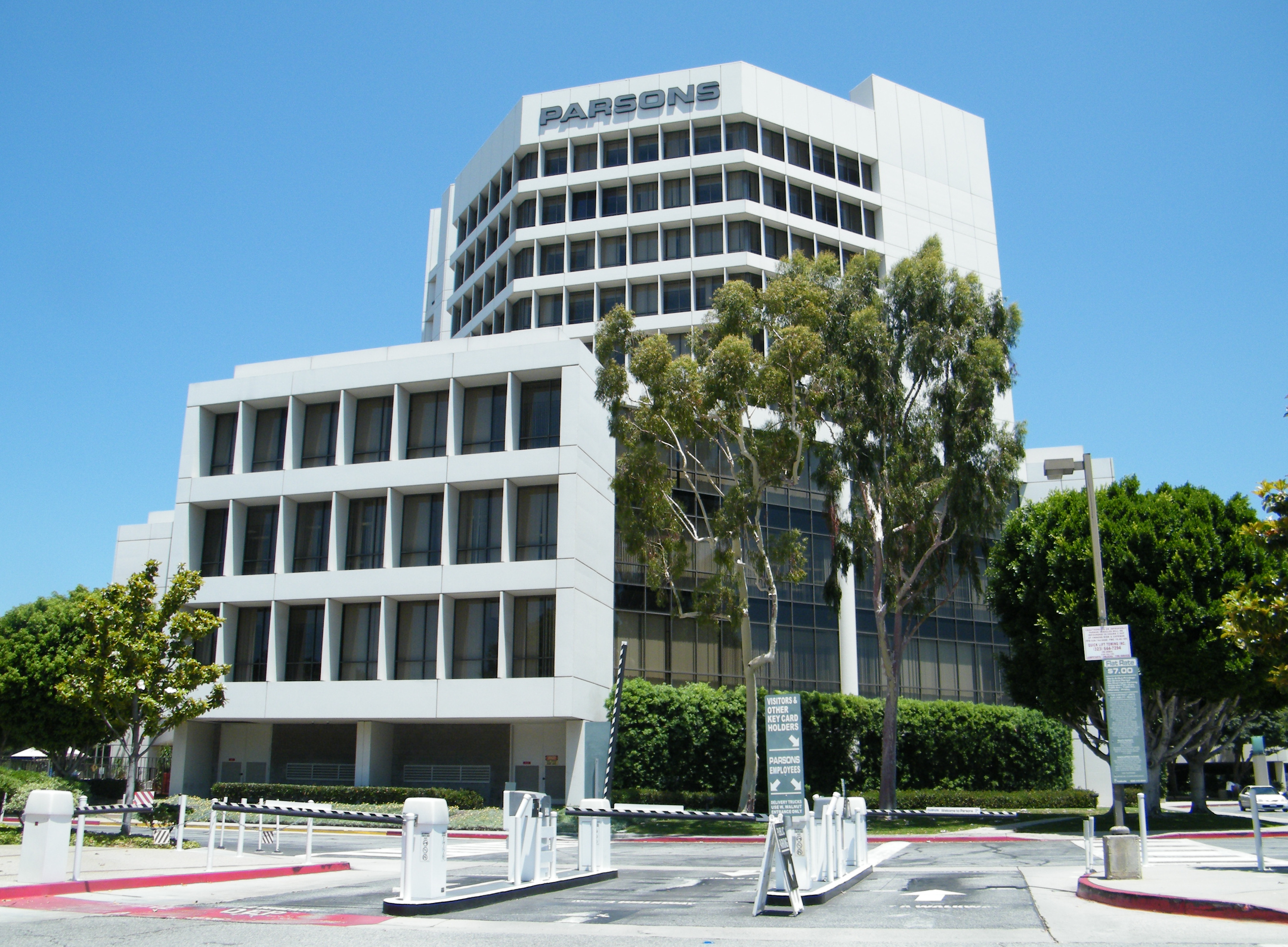
Former Parsons headquarters in Pasadena, California

Parsons was founded by Ralph M. Parsons in 1944. Emerging at the end of World War II, Parsons' location in Los Angeles, proximity to organizations such as the Naval Air and Missile Test Center, Air Force Western Development Division (WDD) and Space and Missile Systems Organization (SAMSO), and partnership with Aerojet Engineering, enabled it acquire early developmental projects including electronics, instrumentation, ground checkout systems design, and engineering for aircraft, missiles and rocket facilities.

In the early 1950s, Parsons efforts in oil and petrochemical process plants came into focus with design/build efforts supporting both Shell and Gulf Oil in Texas. Parsons delivered systems that would also recover sulfur products for later use in industrial processes. Facilities came on line in 1952.

In 1961, Parsons founded the Ralph M. Parsons Foundation. The foundation became entirely independent from the company in 1974. Also in 1974, Parsons opened the first part of its headquarters in Pasadena.

In 1985, Parsons finalized an Employee Stock Ownership Program (ESOP), allocating shares in proportion to employees’ salaries. The ESOP program continues today.

Parsons interest in bridge projects grew through the 1980s, 1990s, and 2000s leveraging credentials enabled by acquisition of firms including DeLeuw, Cather, and Company in 1977 and Steinman, Boynton, Gronquist and Birdsall (SBGB) in 1988. These acquisitions brought experience and pedigree for design and/or refurbishment of iconic bridge structures including the Mackinac Bridge (Steinman, 1957), Tagus River Bridge, and Brooklyn Bridge. Parsons continues to provide inspection, maintenance, and upgrades for these bridges to this day. The company has also secured numerous design, design-build, and/or construction management jobs delivering new bridges such as the Tacoma Narrows Bridge (2007), John James Audubon Bridge, Windsor-Detroit (Gordie Howe) Bridge, and the Don Welge Memorial Bridge.

In April 1996, Parsons CEO at the time, Leonard Pieroni, was killed in a U.S. Air Force plane crash in the Balkans along with U.S. Commerce Secretary Ron Brown.

In October 2004, Parsons sold its hydrocarbons focused business, Parsons E&C Inc, to Australian firm Worley.

In 2012, Parsons developed the logistics strategy for movement of the Space Shuttle Endeavour from Los Angeles International Airport to the California Science Center near downtown. The effort was completed at no cost to NASA or the science center and was delivered by a team of local consultants that contributed expertise and resources for the effort. The activity brought to a close Parsons support for the Space Shuttle program; efforts that began in 1970 when NASA hired Parsons to perform an independent evaluation of facilities options for the Space Transportation System.

In late February 2019, Parsons announced the move of its headquarters from Pasadena, California to Centreville, Virginia.

On May 8, 2019, Parsons executed an Initial Public Offering of approximately $500 million on the New York Stock Exchange under the symbol PSN. When the transaction was conducted, Parsons returned to public status after leaving 35 years before to become a private, employed-owned company.

On September 1, 2023, Parsons announced the move of its headquarters to Chantilly, VA.

Discussing the company's business outlook in February 2024, CEO Carey Smith stated that the company believes it will continue to see strong demand for its solutions, including cyber, electronic warfare, signals collection, space, missile defense and critical Infrastructure protection given world-wide geopolitical outlook.

In 2025, Parsons Corporation pledged a $2.5 million donation to Donald Trump's demolition of the East Wing of the White House and construction of a White House State Ballroom. The New York Times reported on this donation, noting that the donation came at the same that the Parsons Corporation was jockeying for Trump administration contracts valued for more than $1 trillion.

=== Controversies ===
==== Healthcare centers in Iraq ====
In March 2004, Parsons was awarded a contract for a $243 million project to build 150 healthcare centers in Iraq. By March 2006, $186 million had been spent, with six centers complete and accepted by the U.S. Army Corps of Engineers (USACE), 135 centers partly complete, and one reassigned to another contractor. USACE progressively terminated the contract from September 2005 to March 2006, eventually requiring Parsons to complete a total of 20 centers, with the others to be completed by other contractors. The estimated cost for the completion of the other 121 centers was $36 million. Parsons and USACE disputed the degree to which the final 20 centers were completed. A report by the Special Inspector General for Iraq Reconstruction cited problems, including "high turnover among government personnel ... directions ... given without agreement from the contractor ... program managers' responsiveness to contractor communications, cost and time reporting, administration and quality assurance".

==== CBOSS positive train control system ====
In November 2011, Parsons was awarded a $138 million contract by the Peninsula Corridor Joint Powers Board (PCJPB), operators of Caltrain system in Northern California. The contract was to design and install communications-based overlay signal system positive train control (CBOSS PTC) as part of the Caltrain Modernization Program. While physical installation had commenced by September 2013, the project missed its 2015 completion deadline. Caltrain contracted a third party review to assess the project; it found program execution issues caused by both parties. By February 2017, although much of the system had been installed (but not fully tested), Caltrain terminated its contract with Parsons for failure to perform, and announced potential litigation. Caltrain then contracted Wabtec to complete the PTC system. Parsons maintained the contract was wrongly terminated and that the delay was beyond its control. Parsons and PCJPB filed lawsuits against each other seeking damages. During early stages of litigation, Parsons and PCJPB agreed that non-performance by subcontractor Alstom substantially caused the delays. With an agreement by Parsons to waive claims against PCJPB and PCJPB agreeing to assign all rights to recovery over to Parsons, they jointly sued Alstom for damages in September 2021. Judgment was reached in September 2024, with Alstom ordered to pay Parsons damages and interest of $135 million for breach of contract. Alstom has appealed the ruling. Wabtec completed the CBOSS PTC installation, employing 80% of the systems delivered by Parsons on the prior contract.

== Project timeline ==
1940s

Less than two months after Parsons was founded, they were hired to provide turnkey engineering, management, and oil well drilling services to the great divide in Colorado, United States.

In 1948, Parsons began work to develop naval missile facilities at Point Mugu Missile facility. Also in 1948, the Atomic Energy Commission created the Idaho National Engineering Laboratory reactor so that it could conduct advanced nuclear experiments with civilian and military reactors. Parsons designed all facilities for test and support operations—including the largest cast-in-place concrete arch ever poured, a span of 3,000 feet.

1950s

In 1952, the U.S. Army awarded Parsons a multi-year design and construction contract role for numerous laboratory and test facilities at the Redstone Arsenal in Huntsville, Alabama.

In January 1953, Parsons began work on the construction of Turkey's first oil refinery near Batman, Turkey.

Between 1957 and 1960, Parsons designed Port Arguello Launch Complex 1 under contract to the U.S. Navy to support the launch of MIDAS and SAMOS programs using Atlas missiles. The facility was renamed Launch Complex 3 when the Air Force assumed control of the base from the Navy.

In 1958, Parsons began fabrication of electronics and instrumentation including miss-distance indicators for the Pershing Medium Range Ballistic Missile. In June 1959, Parsons was awarded a contract for Titan ICBM facility design to be constructed near Moses Lake Washington.

1960s

In 1961, Parsons designed the installation plans for each of the 1,000 Minuteman intercontinental ballistic missiles, which were used by the U.S. Air Force during the Cold War. In 1964, Ralph M. Parsons managed the design of the U.S. Treasury Philadelphia Mint expansion. Parsons created all construction and equipment specifications, oversaw construction, and prepared operations and maintenance manuals.

In 1962, Parsons commenced design efforts as civil architect-engineer for the Titan III Integrate, Transfer, and Launch (ITL) launch complex at Cape Canaveral Air Force Station. Upon completion, the complex became known as Launch Complex 40 and Launch Complex 41. Features of the ITL design included the Vertical Integration Building (VIB) and Solid Rocket Motor Assembly Building (SMAB). The complex supported its first launch in June 1965.

In February 1963, Parsons was contracted to design the Apollo Spacecraft Propulsion System Development Facility at White Sands New Mexico. In 1964, Parsons created a technical and economic blueprint for the North American Water and Power Alliance (NAWAPA), specifically in the United States, Canada and Mexico. The plan outlined concepts to build an integrated system of dams, channels, tunnels, reservoirs, hydroelectric plants, and pumping stations. The plan ultimately did not move forward due to environmental concerns and cost. In 1966, Parsons has served as general engineering consultant for the DC Washington Metro in Washington, D.C., which is a $11 billion, 103-mile rapid transit rail system connecting Washington, D.C., to its many suburbs.

In 1968, Parsons designed and constructed the entire Honolulu Airport in Honolulu, Hawaii (which is now referred to as the Daniel K. Inouye International Airport), including a 12,000-foot runway on an offshore reef to minimize noise in Honolulu. The runway is still used today. In 1968, Parsons began work to upgrade the Federal Aviation Administration (FAA) by providing plans, specifications, and standards to upgrade air traffic controls in 19 facilities. Today, Parsons provides 24/7/365 technical support services in all nine FAA regions and two specialized FAA centers. Again in 2001, Parsons was the prime contractor to implement modernization plans for the national airspace system.

1970s

In 1970, Parsons was hired by BP and ExxonMobil to perform engineering studies in Alaska to determine if the company could overcome the technical and logistical engineering challenges in Arctic oil production. In 1971, Parsons and Union Oil Co. of California demonstrated an improved sulfur recovery process at Union's Los Angeles pilot refinery plant. Based on the proven capacity to extract over 99% of the sulfur contained in the waste gases, the company was contracted to construct a full scale plant to harvest sulfur for industrial uses and reduce pollution.

Following arctic oil production study, Parsons was hired in 1974 as managing contractor for all oil and gas facilities for BP and Exxon's east side portion of Prudhoe Bay, Alaska. Also in 1974, Parsons provided modernization and construction program services for the new construction on more than 100 major U.S. postal installations. Parsons continues to provide services for the USPS today.

In 1975, Parsons was selected to transform Yanbu, Red Sea in Saudi Arabia into a thriving, modern port complex. The company provided the master plan, design, and construction management services for this self-contained industrial city of more that 100,000 people that produces oil, gas, and petrochemical products used worldwide. Continuing work in the middle east, Parsons won a contract to design, engineer, and manage the construction of multiple facilities for ARAMCO's Saudi Arabian gas program.

In October 1976, the Federal Railroad Administration awarded Parsons, as part of a joint venture, the Northeast Corridor Improvement Program contract, which was to provide a 456-mile, high-speed rail service between Boston, New York, and Washington, D.C. In 1977, Parsons completed a 4-year design-build turnkey program to build the Jeddah Airport in Saudi Arabia (also known as the King Abdulaziz International Airport).

In 1978, Parsons developed facilities criteria for assembly, testing, and system support of the U.S. Air Force's MX missile system at Vandenberg Space Force Base. In addition, as a subcontractor to Martin Marietta, Parsons supported development of the Space Shuttle ground system at Vandenberg. Parsons support to the ground infrastructure development effort continued into the mid-1980s.

1980s

In 1980, Los Angeles selected a Parsons joint venture to provide the Hyperion Wastewater Treatment Plant with program management, advanced planning, conceptual/detailed design, construction management, and startup services on all of their solids- and gas-handling expansion projects. In 1981, Parsons won a contract for the Petromin-Shell petrochemical design-build project, the company's largest petrochemical project ever, valued at $1.5 billion.

In 1985, the Los Angeles Metropolitan Transportation Authority hired a Parsons joint venture to provide commuter rail services and construction management of what would become the MTA's Red Line. Also in 1985, the U.S. Army Corps of Engineers selected Parsons to furnish design, systems integration, engineering, and procurement for the eight chemical weapons incineration plants throughout the continental United States. In 1986, Parsons designed, engineered, and managed construction of the Red Dog mine air and sea ports along with the entire complex.

In 1987, Parsons engineered, designed and delivered the Titan solid booster rocket test stand at Edwards Air Force Base in California. The test stand facility was originally designed by Parsons in the early 1960s to support Saturn V engine testing. Parsons rebuilt the facility again after a 1991 test failure of a Titan IV SRMU motor that caused significant facility damage.

In 1988, Parsons was hired to expand the Dulles (IAD) and Ronald Reagan (DCA) airports. Parsons also continued to oversee rehabilitation of the Brooklyn Bridge that had been started by bridge firm Steinman, Boynton, Gronquist, and Birdsall which had been acquired by Parsons that year.

1990s

In 1992, the Port of Los Angeles selected Parsons to design the Pier 300 $60 million dry bulk terminal for international commodities such as coal and petroleum coke. Also in 1992, Parsons provided engineering cleanup services to the Department of Energy for its uranium enrichment facilities in Ohio. The project was worth $125 million. In 1993, The Southern Nevada Water Authority selected Parsons as PM/CM for their $2 billion capital improvement program to increase water capacity for the Las Vegas Valley. The company continues to provide program and construction management services to SNWA most recently being awarded $150M contract in July 2023.

In 1995, Parsons designed, engineered and managed infrastructure elements of the National Ignition Facility's (NIF) construction. This facility houses the world's most powerful laser. Additionally in 1995, Parsons paid the U.S. $3.2 million to settle fraud claims, the settlement comes from allegations that Parsons knowingly overbilled the government on two Air Force contracts.

In 1996, Parsons was awarded a contract by the USAID to reconstruct Bosnia-Herzegovina, in the Balkans, after the war. In 1997, Parsons began the structural rehabilitation and catenary designs that incorporated electrifying the railroad tracks of the Tagus River Bridge (also known as the 25 de Abril Bridge) in Lisbon, Portugal. The company continues to support bridge improvements and maintenance.

In 1998, Parsons was hired by the U.S. Navy to manage UXO removal in Hawaii. The unexploded ordinances had accumulated in the island of Kaho`olawe. In 1999, Parsons completed the design for the New Baiyun Airport (now called the Guangzhou Baiyun International Airport) in Guangzhou, China. Also in 1999, Parsons was selected to design the Woodrow Wilson Bridge.

2000s

On September 19, 2002, Parsons was awarded a contract to design, build commission and operate the Savannah River Salt Waste Processing Facility (SWPF) in South Carolina by the department of energy. In 2020, the company completed all steps to begin the treatment of radioactive waste at the facility.

On October 8, 2002, Parsons proceeded on the Tacoma Narrows Bridge, a design-build project, originally scheduled to be constructed in 55 months. The bridge was completed and opened in 2007.

In June 2003, a joint-venture team led by Bechtel National, Inc. and Parsons Corporation was selected to destroy chemical weapons at the Bluegrass Army Depot in Kentucky. The final munition was destroyed in July 2023.

In 2004, Parsons served as project manager to cleanup and restore Onondaga Lake in New York.

The same year, a $29.5 million contract was given to both Parsons and Gilbert Southern/Massman Construction to redo a portion of the Escambia Bay Bridge near Pensacola, FL after Hurricane Ivan made landfall and knocked off 58 spans of the original bridge and misaligned 66 other spans. Traffic destined for the bridge was rerouted onto US 90 (exit 17 on I-10) for 2 months while construction was taking place, which caused severe traffic jams. The westbound bridge opened to traffic on October 4, six days ahead of schedule, while the eastbound lanes opened to traffic on November 20, 66 days after Ivan made landfall and 27 days ahead of schedule. Both contractors received $1.5 million in bonuses for the early completion.

In March 2004, Parsons was awarded a contract for a $243 million project to build 150 healthcare centers in Iraq. This contract generated controversy when the US Army Corps of Engineers terminated it, alleging Parsons' failure to perform and reassigning much of the remaining work to other contractors.

In 2005, a Parsons led joint venture constructed the north terminal of the Miami International Airport. The same joint venture (Parsons-Odebrecht) was awarded another contract for the airport to improve the baggage handling system.

In 2006, in a joint-venture, Parsons provided the design review and program/construction supervision for the construction of the Dubai Metro.

2010s

In 2010, Parsons, in a joint-venture, completed the $575 million, LEED-silver-certified Tom Bradley International Terminal Improvements and Baggage Screening Systems Project at Los Angeles International Airport. Parsons was the construction manager for this project. Parsons was also a part of the terminals update in 2006. The company also played a role in post 9/11 Pentagon rebuilding efforts, providing program and construction management services.

In 2011, in a joint-venture, Parsons completed construction on the John James Audubon Bridge in Louisiana. The John James Audubon Bridge is the longest cable-stayed bridge in the Western Hemisphere and is also the first Design-Build project undertaken by the Louisiana Department of Transportation and Development. On November 8, 2012, the bridge was awarded the Design-Build Institute of America (DBIA) 2012 Design Excellence Award.

In 2013, Parsons designed and managed construction for the earthworks, roads and water and wastewater in Saadiyat Island, Abu Dhabi, UAE.

In October 2014, Parsons was awarded a contract by Tecon Investments to oversee major elements of the Dubai Design District (D3).

In April 2016, Parsons received a construction management contract from the Architect of the Capitol to support the restoration, maintenance and renovation of federal structures on the Capitol campus.

In 2016, construction was completed for the World Trade Center Port Authority Trans-Hudson Transportation Hub (PATH). Parsons was responsible for the infrastructure group design of the project, as well as supervising the civil, geo-technical and environmental design of the project. It also oversees the installation of the project's communication and safety systems.

On June 12, 2017, Parsons accepted the award for the Operational Efficiency Project of the Year from the California Transportation Foundation (CTF) for their Intelligent Transportation System work on the I-80 Smart Corridor Project.

In 2017, Parsons worked with Abu Dhabi Airports Company as program manager for the Abu Dhabi International Airport expansion.

In April 2018, Leidos selected Parsons for the lead construction role to revitalize the US Antarctic research base at McMurdo Sound, Antarctica in support of the National Science Foundation US Antarctic Program. In December 2019, it was announced that Parsons and Leidos Holdings Inc. had earned spots on a $4 billion contract to support the cleanup of a former nuclear weapons site in southern Washington state.

2020s

In May 2020, Parsons was awarded the $61 million owner's engineer contract supporting construction of the new Windsor-Detroit (Gordie Howe) Bridge In September of the same year, Parsons was awarded the Recovery of Airbase Denied by Ordnance (RADBO) contract by the Air Force. The contract calls for production and delivery of armored vehicles equipped to clear mines or unexploded ordnance from airfields using three-kilowatt ZEUS laser weapon.

In December 2020, Parsons was awarded a four-year, $37 million competitively awarded contract by Naval Facilities Engineering Command Southwest (NAVFAC SW) to support rebuilding efforts at Naval Air Weapons Station China Lake.

In May 2021, Parsons secured a contract with $185 million ceiling to deliver Integrated Solutions for Situational Awareness (ISSA) for Space Systems Command In July, Parsons was awarded a seven-year contract from the Missile Defense Agency to continue work on the TEAMs Next contract to support the development of defense systems.

In June 2022, the Defense Health Agency awarded Parsons a spot on a potential $10 billion multi-award contract for military medical research and development support.

In 2023, Parsons was confirmed as the delivery partner for The Line at NEOM, a 170 km linear city being built in Saudi Arabia.

On July 7, 2023, U.S. officials announced that the final munition in the nation's obsolete stockpile of chemical weapons at the Blue Grass Chemical Agent Plant has been safely destroyed by Bechtel National, Inc. and Parsons. The team used neutralization and explosive destruction to eliminate the munition.

In March 2024, the National Nuclear Security Administration awarded a contract to Parsons Government Services and SeaTech Global Security Solutions to counter the smuggling of nuclear technology on a global basis. The contract has a combined award value of up to $1 billion. Also in March, the National Oceanic and Atmospheric Administration Office of Space Commerce selected Parsons Corporation to develop key elements of its civil space traffic coordination system called the Traffic Coordination System for Space, or TraCSS. The systems integration contract has a period of performance of 2-years and a potential value of $27 million.

In April 2024, Parsons secured a position on a $464 million contract with the United States Army Environmental Command (USAEC) for services involving hazardous waste, including perfluoroalkyl and polyfluoroalkyl substances (PFAS).

In June 2025, Parsons announced a partnership with IBM in pursuit of opportunities stemming from the Federal Aviation Administration's plans to update and modernize the United States air traffic control system.

Also in June 2025, Parsons was named #1 Program Management Firm by Engineering News-Record (ENR)'s annual list of Top 50 Program Management Firms.

In February 2026, Parsons ran a two-year project led by Honda in collaboration with i-Probe Inc. and the University of Cincinnati. Over the duration of the project, Honda test vehicles with vision and LiDAR sensors covered approximately 3,000 miles in central and southeastern Ohio. These tests were conducted in urban and rural areas, during variable weather conditions, and at different times of day.

On February 6, 2026, The US Army got a high-tech boost against rogue drones along the southern border with DroneArmor, a next-gen counter-unmanned aerial system (C-UAS) platform developed by Parsons Corporation.

On February 17, 2026, the Department of Homeland Security announced that Parsons will oversee and manage the completion of Mexico-United States border wall construction. In a February 10, 2026 interview on The Dan Bongino Show, then-Secretary Kristi Noem stated that DHS is on track to complete border wall construction by January 2028.

On February 17, 2026, The Pima County Sheriff's Department requested Parsons support to assist with the search for Nancy Guthrie. Parsons deployed BlueFly®, a Bluetooth and Wi-Fi sensor intended for search and rescue operations in challenging environments. The technology has been used on a variety of air and ground vehicles, and on foot in austere terrain. It provides first responders with a heat map to identify signals within a search area. BlueFly® was used on Feb. 3 during the Pima County Sheriff's Department Search and Rescue helicopter search over the Guthrie neighborhood. The technology was subsequently used for additional search operations by helicopter, ground vehicles, and on foot.

On February 18, 2026, Sealing Technologies, a Parsons Corporation company, announced that it received an Intent to Award notification from the United States Cyber Command (USCYBERCOM) for a sole-source contract to begin production on the company's Joint Cyber Hunt Kit (JCHK) solution. The three-year period of performance contract is new work for the company with an anticipated ceiling value of up to $500 million.

== Management ==
Carey Smith serves as chairwoman, President, and CEO of Parsons. Matt Oflios serves as the CFO. Parsons operates in two business segments: Federal Solutions and Critical Infrastructure. Additionally the company performs international work especially in the Middle East in countries such as Saudi Arabia.

The board of directors consists of 11 members. As of March 2023, members include:

- Carey Smith: Chairwoman, President, And Chief Executive Officer
- George Ball, Former Chief Financial Officer Of Parsons Corporation
- Mark K. Holdsworth, Founder And Managing Partner Of The Holdsworth Group
- Steven F. Leer, Former Executive Chairman Of The Board Of Directors Of Arch Coal, Inc.
- Ellen Lord, Former Under Secretary Of Defense For Acquisition And Sustainment For The U.S. Department Of Defense
- Letitia A. Long, Former Director Of The National Geospatial-Intelligence Agency (NGA)
- Darren W. McDew, General USAF (ret), Retired U.S. Air Force General
- Harry T. McMahon, Former Executive Vice Chairman Of Bank of America Merrill Lynch
- M. Christian Mitchell, Former National Managing Partner Of Deloitte
- Suzanne M. “Zan” Vautrinot, Major General USAF (ret), President Of Kilovolt Consulting, Inc.
- David C. Wajsgras, Former President Of The Intelligence, Information And Services (IIS) Business (Raytheon)

== Acquisitions ==
Companies acquired by Parsons listed by date of acquisition (incomplete list). Information is current as of Jan 2026.

- 1944, Ralph M. Parsons Company formed
- Jun 1961, Anaconda-Jurden Associates, Inc.
- Jun 1966, Vitro Engineering
- Jun 1971, Dillingham Engineering Pty. Ltd.
- Sep 1977, S.I.P., Inc.
- Oct 1977, DeLeuw, Cather and Company
- May 1981, Engineering Science, Inc.
- Mar 1985, C.T. Main Corporation
- 1988, Steinman, Boynton, Gronquist & Birdsall
- Mar 1995, Gilbert-Commonwealth, Inc.
- May 2005, Alaris Group
- Jun 2006, 3D/International
- Mar 2009, McMunn Associates
- Nov 2011, Sparta, Inc
- Apr 2014, Delcan, Inc.
- May 2014, Secure Mission Solutions
- Nov 2017, Williams Electric
- May 2018, Polaris Alpha
- Jan 2019, OG Systems
- Jul 2019, QRC Technologies
- Oct 2020, Braxton Science & Technology Group
- Jun 2021, Blackhorse Solutions
- Jul 2021, Echo Ridge LLC
- Jun 2022, Xator Corporation
- Apr 2023, IPKeys Power Partners and IPKeys Cyber Partners
- Aug 2023, Sealing Technologies, Inc.
- Jul 2024, BlackSignal Technologies, Inc.
- Oct 2024, BCC Engineering, Inc.
- Feb 2025, TRS Group, Inc.
- Jul 2025, Chesapeake Technology International Corp.
- Oct 2025, Applied Sciences Consulting, Inc.
- Jan 2026, Altamira Technologies.
