= Shootin' Irons =

1927 film

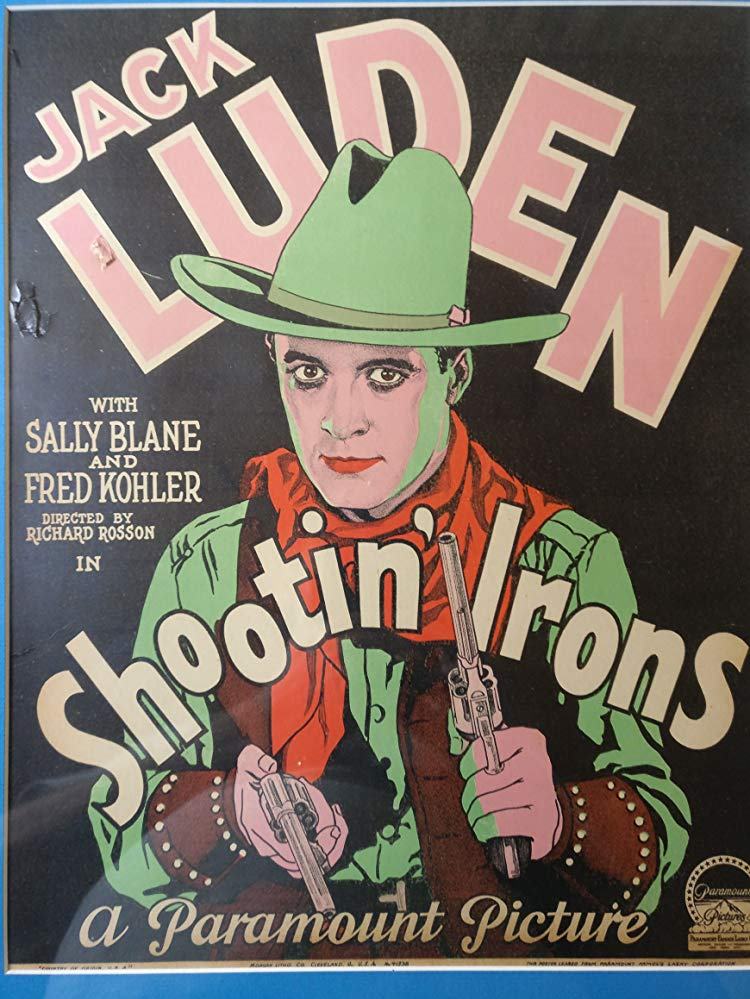
- Directed by: Richard Rosson
- Written by: Richard Allen Gates; Sam Mintz; J. Walter Ruben
- Produced by: B.P. Schulberg
- Starring: Jack Luden; Sally Blane; Fred Kohler
- Cinematography: Henry W. Gerrard
- Production company: Paramount Pictures
- Distributed by: Paramount Pictures
- Release date: October 8, 1927
- Running time: 60 minutes
- Country: United States
- Languages: Silent; English intertitles

Shootin' Irons is a 1927 American silent Western film directed by Richard Rosson and starring Jack Luden, Sally Blane and Fred Kohler.

== Cast ==
- Jack Luden as Pan Smith
- Sally Blane as Lucy Blake
- Fred Kohler as Dick Hardman
- Richard Carlyle as Jim Blake
- Loyal Underwood as Blinky
- Guy Oliver as Judge Mathews
- Scott McKee as Cook
- Arthur Millett as Sheriff

== Production ==
Shootin' Irons was filmed partially on location at Lone Pine, California.

== Bibliography ==
- Munden, Kenneth White. The American Film Institute Catalog of Motion Pictures Produced in the United States, Part 1. University of California Press, 1997.
