= Love 'Em and Leave 'Em (film) =

1926 film

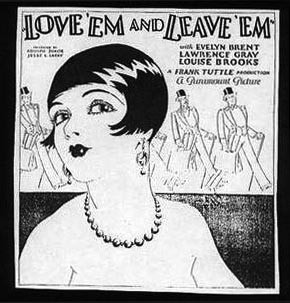
- Poster of the film
- Directed by: Frank Tuttle
- Written by: George Abbott (play); Townsend Martin; John V. A. Weaver
- Produced by: William LeBaron
- Starring: Evelyn Brent
- Cinematography: George Webber
- Edited by: Julian Johnson
- Distributed by: Paramount Pictures
- Release date: September 5, 1926
- Running time: 76 minutes
- Country: United States
- Language: Silent (English intertitles)

Love 'Em and Leave 'Em is a 1926 silent American comedy drama film directed by Frank Tuttle and starring Evelyn Brent. According to the website SilentEra, a 16 mm film print of this film exists. Many foreign and domestic archive holdings.

== Plot ==
Love 'Em and Leave 'Em (1926)

Mame has been caring for her sister Janie since their mother died. While Mame is the responsible one at home, Janie stays out late having fun. Bill, who lives down the hall, is sweet on Mame.

All three work at a department store, where Janie has been made treasurer of the employee league. Lem, a scoundrel in the apartment building, recommends a bet that Janie cannot resist, and she uses some of the league dance money to place her wager. Mame's creative ideas have mistakenly been credited to Bill and he is given a chance to be a window dresser at the store. When Mame leaves on vacation, Bill and Janie try window dressing together, with disastrous results: Janie seduces Bill.

Meanwhile, Mame returns early to find Bill kissing her sister. To top it off, Janie's gambling has left her eighty dollars short. Lem convinces her to bet the last of the league money to cover her losses. Surprisingly, the horse comes in, but Lem lies about placing the bet for her. Janie allows the blame for the missing money to fall on Mame. Although she doesn't deserve it, Mame comes to Janie's rescue by stealing the money back from Lem. When Lem steals it back, the two begin an unusual male-female fight with Mame coming out on top. Even though the money is returned, both Bill and Mame are fired. But all is still right with the world as the couple make up in a display window.

== Cast ==
- Evelyn Brent as Mame Walsh
- Lawrence Gray as Bill Billingsley
- Louise Brooks as Janie Walsh
- Osgood Perkins as Lem Woodruff
- Jack Egan as Cartwright
- Marcia Harris as Miss Streeter
- Edward Garvey as Mr. Whinfer
- Vera Sisson as Mrs. Whinfer
- Joseph McClunn as August Whinfer
- Arthur Donaldson as Mr. McGonigle
- Elise Cavanna as Miss Gimple
- Dorothy Mathews as Minnie
