= The Jade Cup =

1926 film

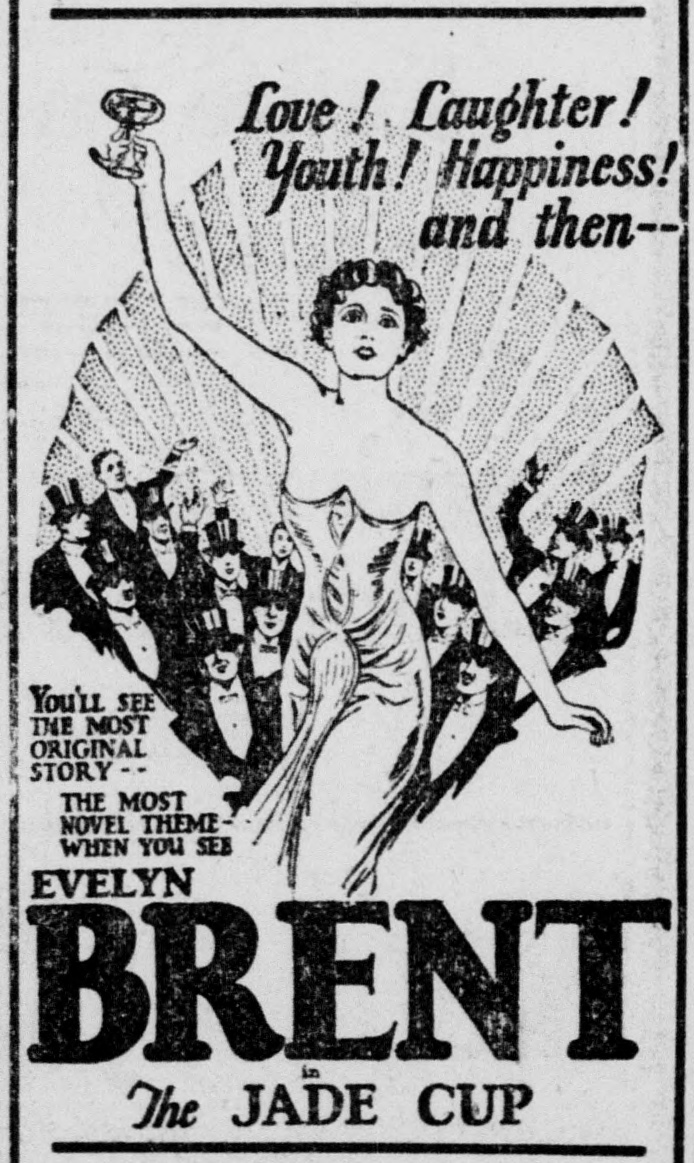
- Newspaper advertisement
- Directed by: Frank Hall Crane
- Written by: Ewart Adamson; Chester Withey
- Starring: Evelyn Brent; Jack Luden; Eugene Borden
- Cinematography: Roy H. Klaffki
- Production company: Gothic Productions
- Distributed by: Film Booking Offices of America; Ideal Films (UK)
- Release date: May 30, 1926
- Running time: 50 minutes
- Country: United States
- Languages: Silent; English intertitles

The Jade Cup is a 1926 American silent mystery film directed by Frank Hall Crane and starring Evelyn Brent, Jack Luden and Eugene Borden.

== Cast ==
- Evelyn Brent as Peggy Allen
- Jack Luden as Billy Crossan
- Eugene Borden as Milano
- George Cowl as Anoine Gerhardt
- Charles Delaney as 'Dice' Morey
- Violet Palmer as Poppy

== Bibliography ==
- Munden, Kenneth White. The American Film Institute Catalog of Motion Pictures Produced in the United States, Part 1. University of California Press, 1997.
