= Second Honeymoon (1930 film) =

1930 film directed by Phil Rosen

- Directed by: Phil Rosen
- Written by: Harry O. Hoyt
- Based on: the novel, The Second Honeymoon by Ruby Mildred Ayres
- Produced by: Trem Carr
- Starring: Josephine Dunn; Edward Earle; Ernest Hilliard
- Cinematography: Herbert Kirkpatrick
- Edited by: Charles Hunt
- Production company: Continental Talking Pictures
- Release date: September 1930 (US)
- Running time: 60 minutes
- Country: United States
- Language: English

Second Honeymoon is a 1930 American silent (with sound sequences) comedy-drama film, directed by Phil Rosen. It stars Josephine Dunn, Edward Earle, and Ernest Hilliard, and was released in September 1930. The film survives.

== Cast ==
- Josephine Dunn as Mary Huntley
- Edward Earle as Jim Huntley
- Ernest Hilliard as Major Ashbrook
- Bernice Elliott as Edith
- Fern Emmett as the maid
- Harry Allen as the sheriff
- Henry Roquemore as the deputy
