= A Man's Man (1929 film) =

1929 film directed by James Cruze

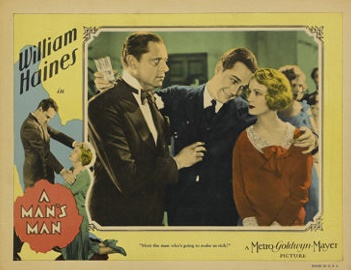
- Lobby card for the film
- Directed by: James Cruze
- Written by: Forrest Halsey
- Based on: A Man's Man by Patrick Kearney
- Produced by: Metro Goldwyn Mayer
- Starring: William Haines
- Cinematography: Merritt B. Gerstad
- Edited by: George Hively
- Distributed by: Metro-Goldwyn-Mayer
- Release date: May 25, 1929
- Running time: 80 minutes
- Country: United States
- Languages: Sound (Synchronized); English intertitles

A Man's Man is a 1929 American synchronized sound comedy film produced and distributed by Metro-Goldwyn-Mayer and directed by James Cruze. While the film has no audible dialog, it was released with a synchronized musical score with sound effects using both the sound-on-disc and sound-on-film process. The film starred William Haines and Josephine Dunn. It was based on a Broadway play, A Man's Man by Patrick Kearney. Greta Garbo and John Gilbert notably appear in a cameo. The film is believed to be lost, although the Vitaphone type sound discs exist and are currently held at the UCLA Film & Television Archive.

== Cast ==
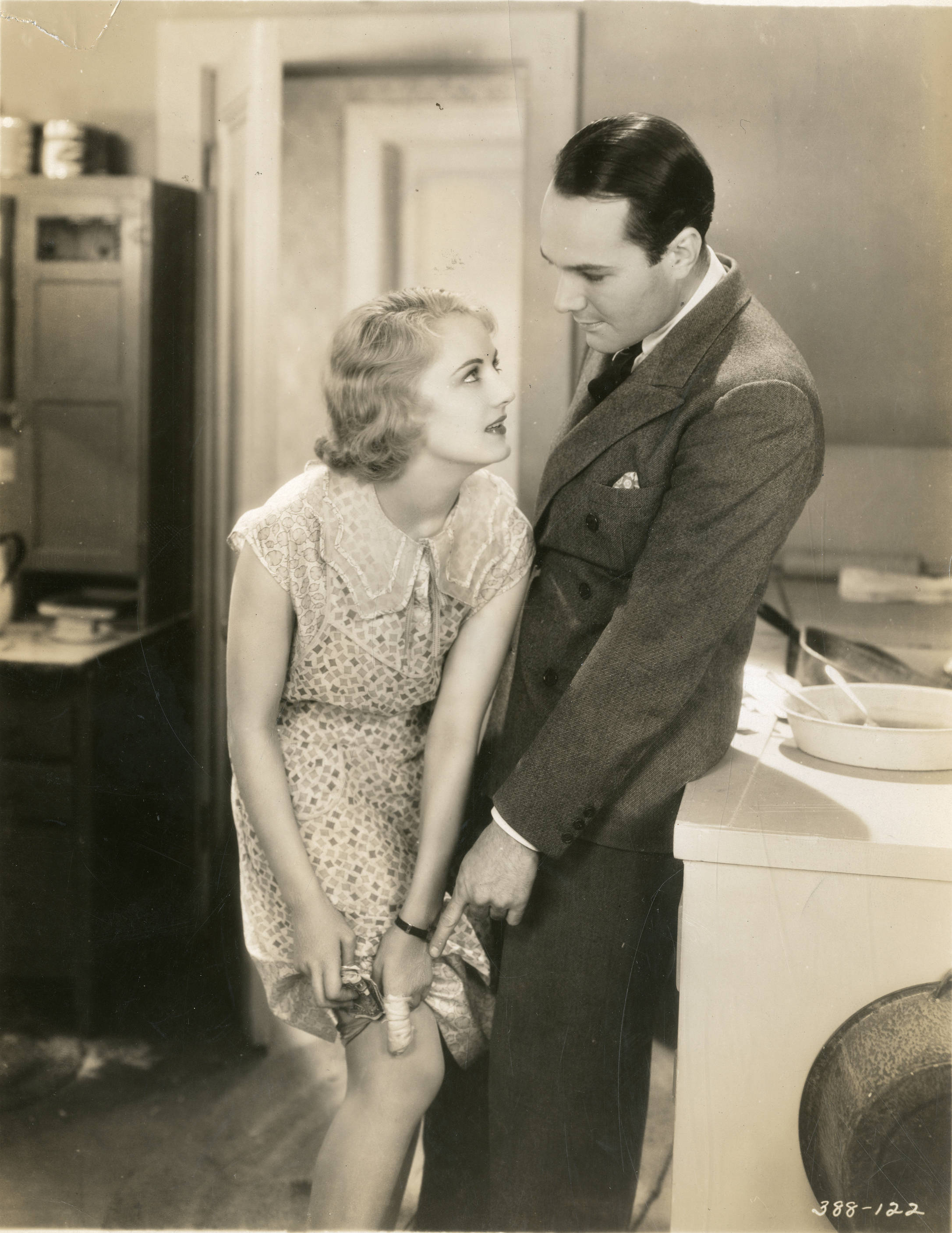
Josephine Dunn and William Haines in A Man's Man

- William Haines as Mel
- Josephine Dunn as Peggy
- Sam Hardy as Charlie
- Mae Busch as Violet
- John Gilbert as Himself
- Greta Garbo as Herself
- Gloria Davenport as Annie
- Delmer Daves (uncredited)
- Fred Niblo (uncredited)

== Music ==
The film featured a theme song entitled "My Heart Is Bluer Than Your Eyes, Cherie" which was written by Al Bryan and Monte Wilhite.

== Preservation ==
With no copies of A Man's Man located in any film archives, it is a lost film.

== See also ==
- List of early sound feature films (1926–1929)
