= Sam Mintz =

American screenwriter

- Born: July 12, 1897; Minsk, Russian Empire
- Died: September 13, 1957 (aged 60); Oakland, California, U.S.
- Occupation: Screenwriter
- Years active: 1925-1948

Sam Mintz (Belarusian: Сэм Мінц; July 12, 1897 – September 13, 1957) was an American screenwriter from Russia during the Russian Empire period, who was nominated in the category of Best Adapted Screenplay at the 4th Academy Awards. He was nominated alongside Joseph L. Mankiewicz. They were nominated for Skippy.

He wrote nearly 40 screenplays during his career.

== Selected filmography ==
- Shootin' Irons (1927)
- Daring Daughters (1933)
- A Glimpse of Paradise (1934)
- Chatterbox (1936)
