= Ralph M. Parsons =

American businessperson

Ralph Monroe Parsons (22 June 1896 – 20 December 1974) was an American engineer and businessman. He was the founder of the Parsons Corporation.

== Biography ==
Born in 1896 in Springs, Long Island, Parsons was interested in engineering from an early age.

At age 13, he opened a garage and machine shop in Amagansett, Long Island, with his older brother. He studied steam and machine design at Pratt Institute, and graduated in 1916. He enlisted in the US Navy as a machinist's mate, with intentions to get training and experience in aeronautical engineering, and was discharged in 1921 as a lieutenant (j.g.). After that he took a job as a civilian aeronautical engineer for the Navy, till the mid-1920s when he left to specialize in oil refinery engineering.

During World War II, Parsons formed a partnership with Stephen D. Bechtel (later his chief rival) and John A. McCone (later head of the Central Intelligence Agency). In 1944, he founded Ralph M. Parsons Company. The company managed the construction of petroleum refineries, chemical plants, mines, metallurgical facilities, missile and space vehicle launching facilities and nuclear plants.

Parsons remained chairman and chief executive officer of the company until his death. He died aged 78 in December 1974 in San Marino, California. The Ralph M. Parsons Foundation is named after him.
