= Enra =

Japanese performing arts company

enra
Performing Arts Company
- Founded: March 1, 2012
- Based: Tokyo, Japan
- Collaborators: 花房伸行 (Nobuyuki Hanabusa, Video Artist / Director)、金子ノブアキ (Nobuaki Kaneko, Musician / Actor)、→Pia-no-jaC← (Musical Group)
- Members: 加世田剛 (Tsuyoshi Kaseda)、横山真希 (Maki Yokoyama)、汰椿 (Tachun)、石出一敬 (Kazunori Ishide)、森本天子 (Takako Morimoto)、野中葵 (Aoi Nonaka)
- Former Members: 和多谷沙耶 (Saya Watatani)、望月ゆうさく (Yusaku Mochizuki)
- Website: http://enra.jp/

Japanese performing arts company enra (stylized in lowercase Latin letters.) combines video art with live performance, synchronizing human body motion with computer graphics. Established March 1, 2012, as of 2019 enra is a collective centered around six performers: Tsuyoshi Kaseda, Maki Yokoyama, Tachun, Kazunori Ishide, Takako Morimoto, and Aoi Nonaka.

== Tradition and origin ==
The Tokyo-based performing arts and production company seeks to create the ultimate union between motion graphics and live performance. The intent is to synchronize on-screen images with dance and other forms of live expression. Made up of eight individual performers, enra incorporates martial arts (especially wushu), rhythmic gymnastics, ballet, animation dance, juggling (especially with the diabolo), and club dance into its performances.

Performances by enra consist of a synchronized fusion of motion graphics (video art) and live performance (contemporary dance in a variety of genres) in front of a screen. The group regularly performs all over the world, and has received high praise not only in its native Japan, but also in Europe, North America, East and Southeast Asia, and the Middle East.

In Japan, enra performed as a guest of the prime minister of Japan at the official welcoming dinner for the International Olympic Committee (IOC) during its evaluation of the 2020 Tokyo Olympics plan, an event that also served to commemorate the 50-year anniversary of the 1964 Tokyo Olympics.

FILMS, an homage to movies, was performed by enra to open the award ceremony at the 68th Festival de Cannes, where the group also walked the red carpet.

In March 2016, enra kicked off its 2016 Japan tour with a public performance at Kitazawa Town Hall in Shimokitazawa, Tokyo.

enra walked the red carpet a second time at the Lunas del Auditorio ceremony at the National Auditorium in Mexico City in October 2016, where they performed as a special guest.

== Name origin ==
According to the Mainichi Shimbun, "The group's name is derived from the smoke-like shape-shifting Japanese yōkai spirit, Enenra".

== Performance history ==
=== 2012 ===
- Japan: Short Shorts Film Festival & Asia 2012 Award Ceremony
- Japan: Kiryu Film Festival 2012 Opening Act
- Japan: Momoiro Clover Z X’mas Eve Live
- Japan: Information & Media 10th Anniversary, Doshisha Women's College of Liberal Arts
- Japan: IOC Evaluation Commission Visit - Prime Minister's Tokyo 2020 Dinner

=== 2013 ===
- Hong Kong: Citibank ULTIMA Card Presentation
- Indonesia: NET. Mediatama Indonesia Launch Event
- Romania: Summer Well Music Festival 2013, Bucharest
- Japan: Honda Fit & Fit Hybrid Unveiling
- Japan: Mori Art Museum 10th Anniversary Gala Dinner
- Japan: Sharp AQUOS XL10 Web Commercial
- China: Gust performance of Primitive at Hermès Forum

=== 2014 ===
- Japan: Patek Philippe 175th Anniversary Event
- Japan: Bioderma Japan Anniversary Party
- Qatar: Japanese Projection solo performance in Doha
- France: CB 30th Anniversary - Le Petit Palais, Paris
- France: Performance at Opéra Comique, Paris
- Germany: Zeiss AG ZEISS Forum
- Spain: TV appearance on El Hormiguero
- Singapore: Samarpana 2014: The Asian Festival of Classical Dance
- Japan: At →PJ←WONDERLAND~ with →Pia-no-jaC← in Zepp Tokyo
- Czech Republic: Volkswagen Passat 8 Event
- Japan: Primitive performed in Tokyo
- China: Primitive performed in Hong Kong
- Singapore: Morgan Stanley Gala Dinner
- SK-II Web Commercial

=== 2015 ===
- USA: 16th Contemporary Dance Showcase: Japan and East Asia
- USA: 31st Space Symposium
- China: Hewlett-Packard Event
- Turkey: Gala Modern at the Istanbul Museum of Modern Art
- Switzerland: IWC Gala Dinner
- Costa Rica: TEDxPuraVida
- Bahrain: Corporate Event
- USA: Appearance on America’s Got Talent
- France: Oponening act for the 68th Festival de Cannes award ceremony
- Singapore: Primitive solo performance at Flipside 2015 Esplanade
- Switzerland: Red Cross Ball – Gala Dinner, Geneva
- Taiwan: Solo performance at Taiwan National Theater
- Romania: Orange 4U performance
- Japan: Lexus 10th Anniversary Event
- USA tour 2015
  - Birmingham, Alabama
  - Memphis, Tennessee
  - Durango, Colorado
  - Detroit, Michigan
  - Knoxville, Tennessee
- Portugal: Solo performance at Centro Cultural de Belém, Lisbon

=== 2016 ===
- India: Opening act for a corporate event in Mumbai
- Japan: Google Brandcast Tokyo
- Italy: Opening act for a corporate event at Pala Alpitour
- UAE: YPO EDGE conference opening act in Dubai
- Australia: Guest performance at a corporate event
- Kuwait: Opening act for Porsche 911 launch event
- Japan: Performance with Nobuaki Kaneko of Rize in Tokyo
- Argentina: Coca-Cola rebranding event in Buenos Aires
- Singapore: Michelin Guide 2016 Award Ceremony & Gala Dinner
- Japan: Planet performance in Achimura, Nagano
- Portugal: Guest performance at European Inventor Award Ceremony in Lisbon
- Japan: Newton performance at 21st Century Museum of Contemporary Art, Kanazawa
- Germany: Corporate event in Berlin
- United States: Future of StoryTelling summit in New York City
- Mexico: Lunas del Auditorio guest performance
- Japan: PROXIMA Tour 2016
  - Tokyo
  - Toyama
  - Sendai
  - Sapporo
  - Niigata
  - Okayama
  - Hyogo
  - Kurume (Fukuoka)
  - Nagano
  - Osaka
- United States: PROXIMA North America Tour 2016
  - Newport News, VA
  - Muncie, IN
  - Skokie, IL (Chicago)
  - Los Angeles, CA
- Taiwan: PROXIMA at the Taichung Arts Festival
- Mexico: PROXIMA North America Tour 2016: PROXIMA in Mexico City
- UAE: ADIPEC Awards Gala Dinner in Abu Dhabi
- Japan: Hublot All Black Night Event
- Japan: BiG-i Art Festival

=== 2017 ===
- Japan: PARALLEL WORLD at Akasaka Blitz with →Pia-no-jaC← in Tokyo
- Japan: Performance at International Luxury Travel Market
- Japan: Performance at Audi Event
- Macau: Performance at Sands Macau
- UAE: Private event
- Kuwait: Kuwait K-IT Day
- Australia: Corporate event
- USA: Palm Springs Art Museum Gala: Embracing the Abstract
- USA: PROXIMA at Harris Center in Folsom, CA
- France: Pyramides d'Argent de la Fédération des Promoteurs, Marseille
- USA: Solo performance at Dollywood
- Japan: Show at Toin Gakuen
- Japan: Event in Miyazaki
- Mexico: PROXIMA at Teatro de la Ciudad Esperanza Iris, Mexico City
- Mexico: PROXIMA at Forum Cultural Guanajuato, León, Guanajuato
- Japan: Dassault Systèmes 3DEXPERIENCEFORUM
- Thailand: J Series Festival

=== 2018 ===
- South Korea: 4IR Performing Arts Conference
- Spain: Corporate event in Castellón
- China: China International Youth Arts Festival
- UAE: Performances at ADIPEC, Abu Dhabi
- China: VOYAGER in Shanghai
- Thailand: Japan Expo
- Japan: Dealer event for Honda Canada
- Japan: GHOST premiere in Sapporo
- Japan: pleiades in Achi Mura

=== 2019 ===
- UAE: Performance at WFES, Abu Dhabi
- Egypt: Performance at EGYPS, Cairo
- Singapore: Corporate event
- Japan, Taiwan, India: Sands Macao Roadshow Event
- Switzerland: Performances at Numerik Games Festival
- Russia: Corporate event in Ekaterinburg
- Hong Kong: JNA Awards 2019 Ceremony and Gala Dinner
- Oman: Marriott International Event
- Japan: Winter Night Tour in Achi Mura
