= Paramount Pictures School =

Short-lived acting school from 1925 to 1928

The Paramount Pictures School was a short-lived acting school established in 1925 by the Famous Players–Lasky Corporation (FPLC). Sixteen students studied at the school, including Charles "Buddy" Rogers and Thelma Todd. A film showcasing the work of the students was released in 1926 as Fascinating Youth. Located at the FPLC studios in the Long Island City neighborhood of New York City, the school was an effort to improve the recruiting of acting talent for films.

Students were selected via tests across the United States, with the country divided into 30 districts. Ages of participants ranged from 18 to 30 for males and 16 to 25 for females. Those who survived initial elimination received screen tests. Applicants who had the best screen tests were interviewed by film producer Jesse L. Lasky,

Applying and testing cost prospective students nothing except their expenses for getting to the testing sites. Students who were chosen for the school paid $500 per term for tuition and $25 per week for living expenses for the 22-week term, making the total cost for a term $1,075.

Students who successfully completed the program were promised a chance for a one-year contract with FPLC, with a four-year option and a personal letter of reference from Lasky along with film clips and still photographs.

By April 1928, the school had ceased to exist, with few of its graduates achieving success in films. In a column in the April 8, 1928, edition of the Brooklyn Daily Eagle, Martin Dickstein blamed the school's demise on two factors: "The sole requirement demanded of the candidates was that they photograph becomingly", and the faculty "forgot to teach the handsome ninnies how to act!"
