= Fascinating Youth =

1926 film by Sam Wood

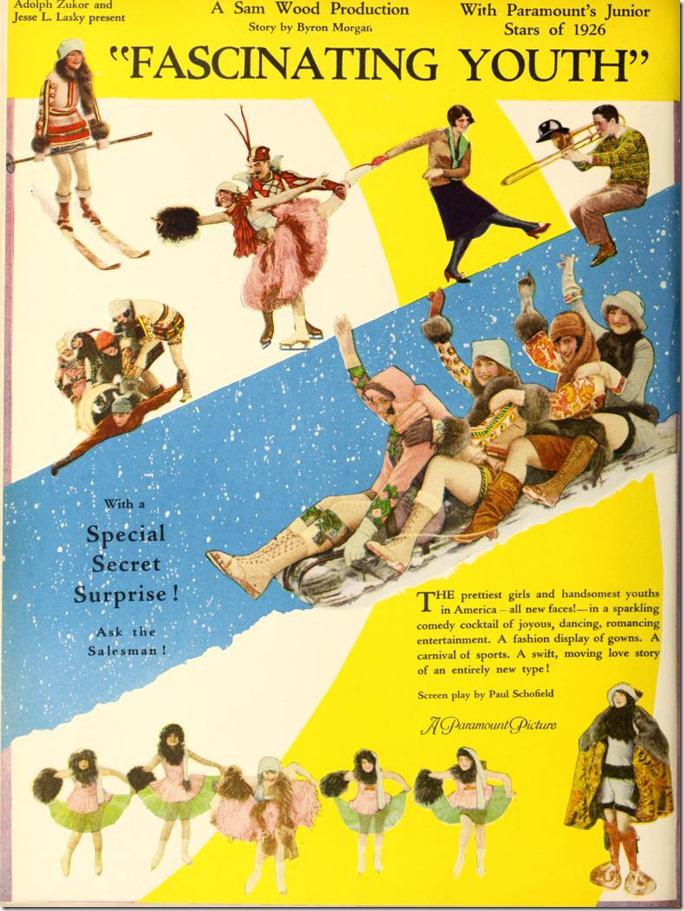
- Directed by: Sam Wood
- Written by: Paul Schofield (scenario)
- Story by: Byron Morgan
- Produced by: Adolph Zukor; Jesse L. Lasky
- Starring: Charles "Buddy" Rogers; Thelma Todd
- Cinematography: Leo Tover
- Distributed by: Paramount Pictures (as Famous Players–Lasky Corporation)
- Release dates: March 17, 1926 (Premiere); August 23, 1926 (U.S.)
- Running time: 70 minutes
- Country: United States
- Language: Silent (English intertitles)

Fascinating Youth is a 1926 American silent romantic comedy film directed by Sam Wood. It starred Charles "Buddy" Rogers (in his feature debut), along with Thelma Todd and Josephine Dunn in supporting roles. Many well-known personalities made guest appearances in the film, judging a beauty contest in one scene, and Clara Bow makes a cameo appearance in her second film for Paramount Pictures.

== Cast ==
- Charles "Buddy" Rogers as Teddy Ward
- Ivy Harris as Jeanne King
- Jack Luden as Ross Page
- Walter Goss as Randy Furness
- Claude Buchanan as Bobby Stearns
- Mona Palma as Dotty Sinclair
- Thelma Todd as Lorraine Lane
- Josephine Dunn as Loris Lane
- Thelda Kenvin as Betty Kent
- Jeanne Morgan as Mae Oliver
- Dorothy Nourse as Mary Arnold
- Irving Hartley as Johnnie
- Gregory Blackton as Frederick Maine
- Robert Andrews as Duke Slade
- Charles Brokaw as Gregory
- Iris Gray as Sally Lee
- Ralph Lewis as John Ward
- Joseph Burke as Ward's Secretary
- James Bradbury Sr. as The Professor
- Harry Sweet as The Sheriff
- William Black as Deputy Sheriff
- Richard Dix as himself
- Adolphe Menjou as himself
- Clara Bow as herself
- Lois Wilson as herself
- Percy Marmont as himself
- Chester Conklin as himself
- Thomas Meighan as himself
- Lila Lee as herself
- Lewis Milestone as himself
- Malcolm St. Clair as himself

== Preservation ==
With no prints of Fascinating Youth located in any film archives, it is a lost film, with only the trailer surviving.
