= The Crimson Canyon =

1928 film

- Directed by: Ray Taylor
- Screenplay by: Hugh Nagrom; Carl Krusada
- Story by: Hugh Nagrom
- Starring: Ted Wells; Lotus Thompson; Wilbur Mack; Buck Connors; George Atkinson
- Cinematography: Joseph Brotherton
- Edited by: Gene Havlick
- Production company: Universal Pictures
- Distributed by: Universal Pictures
- Release date: October 14, 1928
- Running time: 60 minutes
- Country: United States
- Languages: Silent; English intertitles

The Crimson Canyon is a 1928 American silent Western film directed by Ray Taylor and written by Hugh Nagrom and Carl Krusada. The film stars Ted Wells, Lotus Thompson, Wilbur Mack, Buck Connors and George Atkinson. The film was released on October 14, 1928, by Universal Pictures.

== Cast ==
- Ted Wells as Phil 'Six Gun' Lang
- Lotus Thompson as Daisy Lanning
- Wilbur Mack as Sam Slade
- Buck Connors as 'Dad' Packard
- George Atkinson as Abner Slade
