= Grit Wins =

1929 film

- Directed by: Joseph Levigard
- Screenplay by: George H. Plympton; Carl Krusada
- Starring: Ted Wells; Kathleen Collins; Al Ferguson; Buck Connors; Nelson McDowell; Buck Moulton
- Cinematography: William S. Adams
- Edited by: Gene Havlick
- Production company: Universal Pictures
- Distributed by: Universal Pictures
- Release date: January 27, 1929
- Running time: 50 minutes
- Country: United States
- Language: Silent

Grit Wins is a 1929 American silent Western film directed by Joseph Levigard and written by George H. Plympton and Carl Krusada. The film stars Ted Wells, Kathleen Collins, Al Ferguson, Buck Connors, Nelson McDowell and Buck Moulton. The film was released on January 27, 1929, by Universal Pictures.

== Cast ==
- Ted Wells as Jack Deering
- Kathleen Collins as Nan Pickens
- Al Ferguson as Logan
- Buck Connors as Ted Pickens
- Nelson McDowell as John Deering
- Buck Moulton as Jake
