= The Golden Fleece (film) =

1918 film

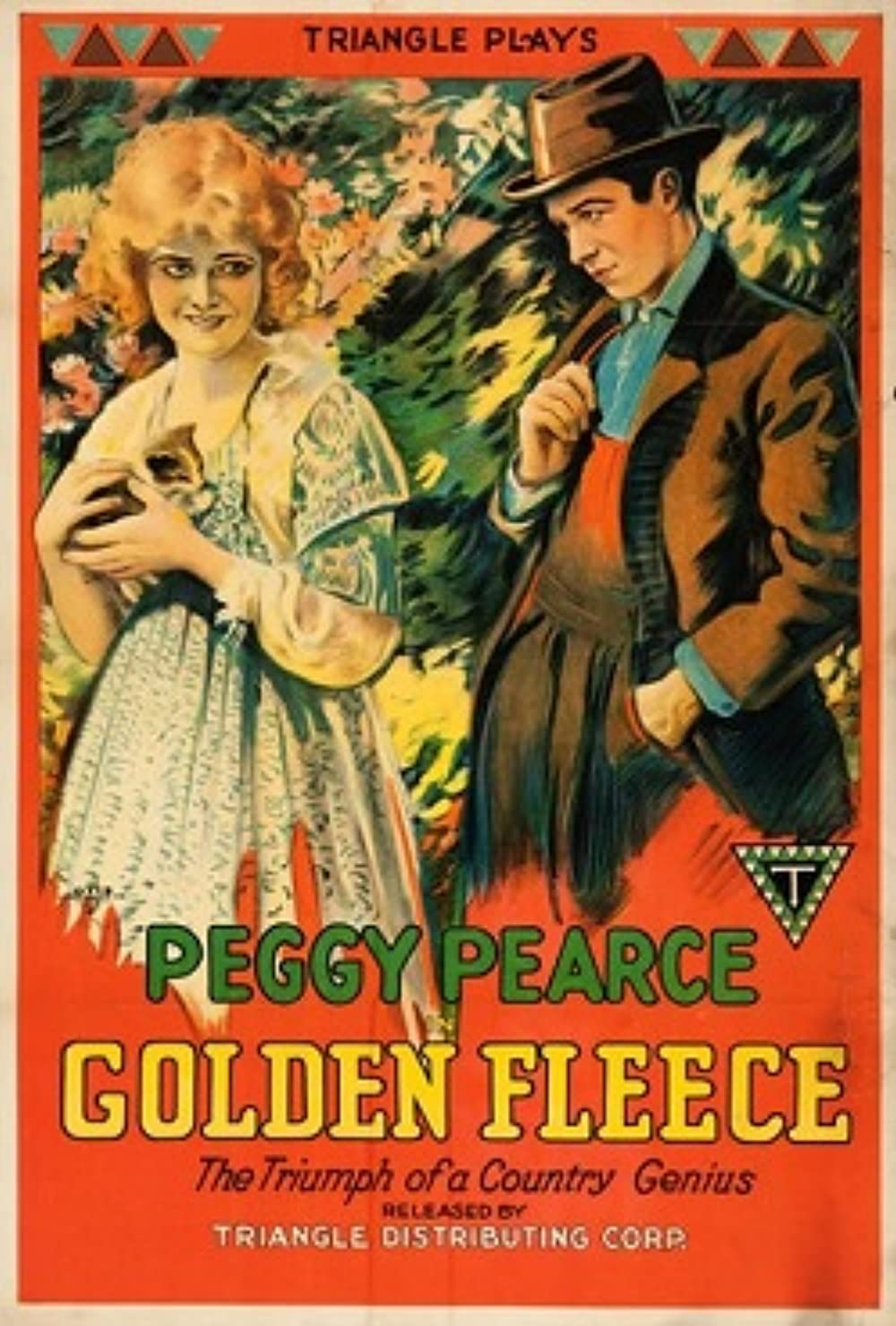
- Directed by: Gilbert P. Hamilton
- Written by: Frederick Irving Anderson; George Elwood Jenks
- Starring: Joseph Bennett; Peggy Pearce; Jack Curtis
- Cinematography: Gilbert Warrenton
- Production company: Triangle Film Corporation
- Distributed by: Triangle Distributing
- Release date: July 28, 1918
- Running time: 50 minutes
- Country: United States
- Languages: Silent; English intertitles

The Golden Fleece is a 1918 American silent comedy drama film directed by Gilbert P. Hamilton and starring Joseph Bennett, Peggy Pearce and Jack Curtis.

== Cast ==
- Joseph Bennett as Jason
- Peggy Pearce as Rose
- Jack Curtis as Bainge
- Harvey Clark as Regelman
- Graham Pettie as Hiram

== Censorship ==
Before The Golden Fleece could be exhibited in Kansas, the Kansas Board of Review required the removal of all scenes where a woman is smoking.

== Bibliography ==
- Connelly, Robert B. The Silents: Silent Feature Films, 1910-36, Volume 40, Issue 2. December Press, 1998.
- Munden, Kenneth White. The American Film Institute Catalog of Motion Pictures Produced in the United States, Part 1. University of California Press, 1997.
