= Walter Shumway =

American actor

- Born: October 26, 1884; Cleveland, Ohio, United States
- Died: January 13, 1965 (aged 80); Los Angeles, California, United States
- Occupation: Actor
- Years active: 1918–1950 (film)

Walter Shumway (October 26, 1884 – January 13, 1965) was an American film actor. A character actor he appeared in a variety of supporting roles in films and serials between 1918 and 1950. He was married to the actress Corra Beach.

== Selected filmography ==
- Wine (1924)
- Pretty Ladies (1925)
- Return of Grey Wolf (1926)
- Hi-Jacking Rustlers (1926)
- Catch-As-Catch-Can (1927)
- The Pinto Kid (1928)
- The Apache Raider (1928)
- The Mystery Rider (1928)
- The Yellow Cameo (1928)
- Greased Lightning (1928)
- The Tip Off (1929)
- Headin' North (1930)
- The Spell of the Circus (1931)
- The Night Rider (1932)
- Outlaw Justice (1932)
- Ghost City (1932)
- Fighting Shadows (1935)
- What Becomes of the Children? (1936)
- Whirlwind Horseman (1938)
- Six-Gun Rhythm (1939)
- The Showdown (1940)
- Wrangler's Roost (1941)
- Double Cross (1941)
- Girls of the Big House (1945)

== Bibliography ==
- Agrasánchez, Rogelio . Guillermo Calles: A Biography of the Actor and Mexican Cinema Pioneer. McFarland, 2010.
- Rainey, Buck. Serials and Series: A World Filmography, 1912-1956. McFarland, 2015.
