= The Night Horsemen =

1921 film

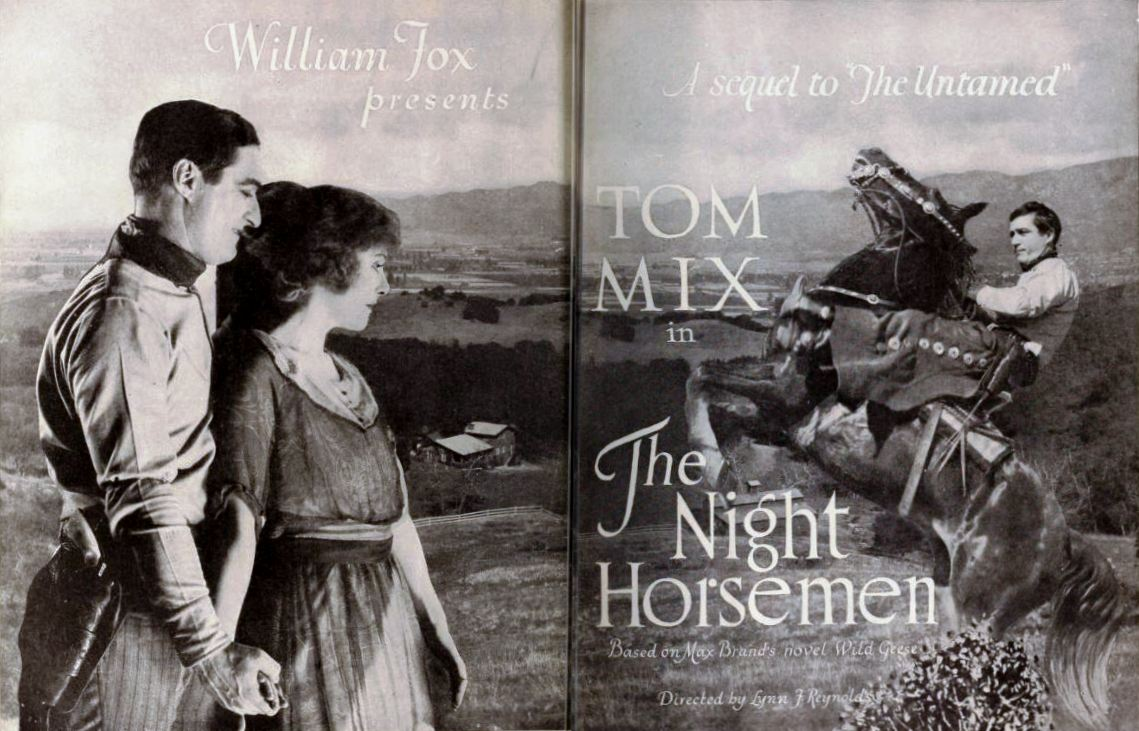
- Advertisement
- Directed by: Lynn Reynolds
- Written by: Lynn F. Reynolds
- Based on: Wild Geese by Max Brand
- Produced by: William Fox
- Starring: Tom Mix
- Cinematography: Benjamin H. Kline (credited as Ben Kline)
- Distributed by: Fox Films
- Release date: September 1921
- Running time: 5 reels
- Country: United States
- Languages: Silent; English intertitles

The Night Horsemen is a surviving 1921 American silent Western film directed by Lynn Reynolds and starring Tom Mix. It was produced by William Fox and released by Fox Film Corporation. It was advertised as a sequel to the film The Untamed (1920), but the only actor reprising their role was Mix.

A print is preserved in the George Eastman Museum Motion Picture Collection.

== Cast ==
- Tom Mix as Whistling Dan
- May Hopkins as Kate Cumberland
- Harry Lonsdale as Old Joe Cumberland
- Joseph Bennett as Dr. Byrne
- Sid Jordan as Buck Daniels
- Bert Sprotte as Mac Strann
- Cap Anderson as Jerry Strann
- Lon Poff as Haw Haw
- Charles K. French as Marshal
