= Lon Poff =

American actor (1870–1952)

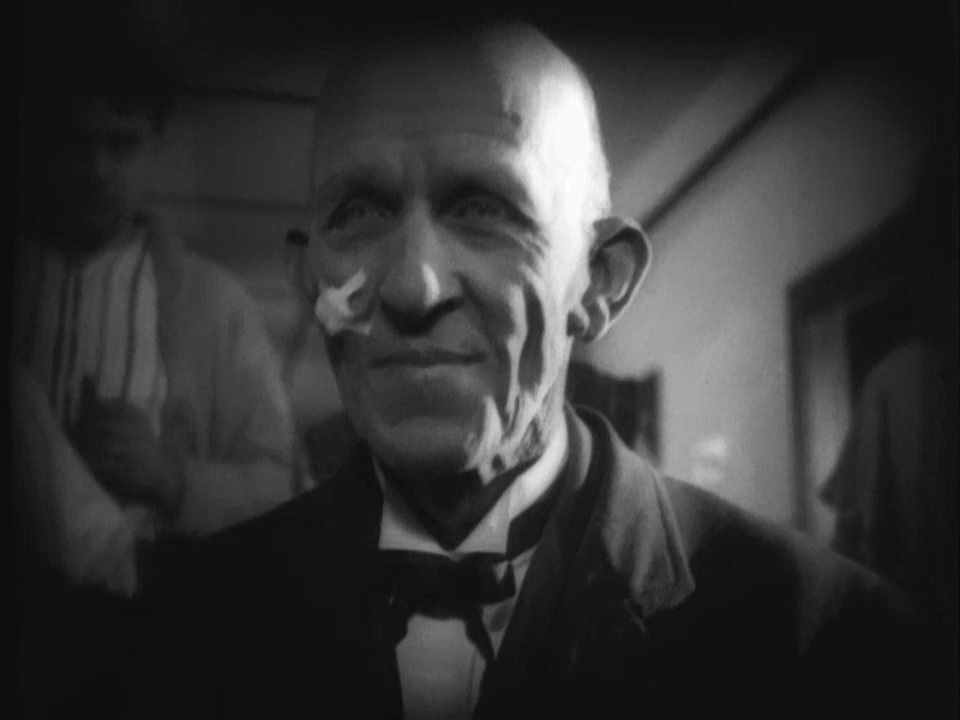
- Poff in Greed (1924)
- Born: February 8, 1870; Bedford, Indiana, US
- Died: August 8, 1952 (aged 82); Los Angeles, California, US
- Years active: 1917–1951

Alonzo M. "Lon" Poff (February 8, 1870 – August 8, 1952) was an American film actor who appeared in almost 100 films between 1917 and 1951.

Born in Bedford, Indiana, he was the son of Mrs. Mary E. Poff, and he had a sister, Grace Poff. He died in Los Angeles, California. His grave is located in Glendale's Forest Lawn Memorial Park Cemetery.

== Selected filmography ==
- '49-'17 (1917) - Bald-Headed Wrangler (uncredited)
- The Scarlet Car (1917) - Constable (uncredited)
- The Grand Passion (1918) - Villager (uncredited)
- The Light of Western Stars (1918) - Monta Price
- The Shepherd of the Hills (1919) - Jim Lane
- The Last Straw (1920) - Rev. Beal
- Bonnie May (1920)
- Sand! (1920) - Jim Kirkwood (uncredited)
- Square Shooter (1920) - Sandy
- The Man Who Dared (1920) - Long John
- The Old Swimmin' Hole (1921) - Professor Payne - Schoolmaster
- Big Town Ideas (1921) - Deputy
- The Three Musketeers (1921) - Father Joseph
- The Night Horsemen (1921) - Haw Haw
- Turn to the Right (1922) - Townsman (uncredited)
- Tracked to Earth (1922) - Meeniee Wade
- The Prisoner of Zenda (1922) - Archbishop (uncredited)
- The Village Blacksmith (1922) - Gideon Crane
- Peg o' My Heart (1922) - Priest (uncredited)
- Brass Commandments (1923) - Slim Lally
- Suzanna (1923) - Álvarez
- The Girl I Loved (1923) - Minister (circuit rider)
- Souls for Sale (1923) - Tall Actor in Casting Office (uncredited)
- Main Street (1923) - Chet Dashaway
- The Man Who Won (1923) - Sandy Joyce
- The Untameable (1923) - Bit Role (uncredited)
- The Virginian (1923) - Shorty's Chum (uncredited)
- The Man from Wyoming (1924) - Jim McWilliams
- Excitement (1924) - Roger Cove
- Dante's Inferno (1924) - The Secretary (uncredited)
- Darwin Was Right (1924) - Egbert Swift
- Greed (1924) - Lottery Agent (uncredited)
- A Fool and His Money (1925) - Citizen
- A Thief in Paradise (1925) - Jardine's Secretary
- The Million Dollar Handicap (1925) - Milkman
- Isn't Life Terrible? (1925, Short) - Mr. Jolly
- The Merry Widow (1925) - Sadoja's Lackey (uncredited)
- Without Mercy (1925) - Madame Gordon's 1st Henchman (uncredited)
- Mantrap (1926) - Minister (uncredited)
- Marriage License? (1926) - Footman
- Bardelys the Magnificent (1926) - Prison Friar (uncredited)
- Long Fliv the King (1926)
- The Silent Rider (1927) - Bit Part (uncredited)
- The Tender Hour (1927) - Party Guest
- The First Auto (1927) - D. P. Graves (uncredited)
- Silver Valley (1927) - 'Slim' Snitzer
- The Valley of the Giants (1927) - Bookkeeper (uncredited)
- Two Lovers (1928) - Minor Role (uncredited)
- The Man Who Laughs (1928) - (uncredited)
- Wheel of Chance (1928) - Russian (uncredited)
- Greased Lightning (1928) - Beauty Jones
- The Viking (1928) - Friar Slain by Vikings (uncredited)
- Two Tars (1928, Short) - Motorist
- The Faker (1929) - Hadiran's Aid
- The Iron Mask (1929) - Father Joseph
- Courtin' Wildcats (1929) - Professor
- The Lone Star Ranger (1930) - Townsman (uncredited)
- The Bad One (1930) - (uncredited)
- The Laurel-Hardy Murder Case (1930, Short) - Old Relative (uncredited)
- Noche de duendes (1930) - Anciano (uncredited)
- Tom Sawyer (1930) - Judge Thatcher
- Behind Office Doors (1931) - Mr. Burden (uncredited)
- I Take This Woman (1931) - Marriage License Clerk (uncredited)
- Caught (1931) - Clem
- Way Back Home (1931) - Constable (uncredited)
- Ambassador Bill (1931) - Armored Car Chauffeur (uncredited)
- Stepping Sisters (1932) - The Depression (uncredited)
- The Expert (1932) - Morgue Attendant (uncredited)
- Whistlin' Dan (1932) - Jud Beal - Banker (uncredited)
- So Big (1932) - Deacon (uncredited)
- Midnight Warning (1932) - Welsh (uncredited)
- Mystery of the Wax Museum (1933) - Tall Thin Henchman (uncredited)
- Hello, Everybody! (1933) - Constable
- Diplomaniacs (1933) - Bald Adoop Indian (uncredited)
- Tillie and Gus (1933) - Juror (uncredited)
- Girl Without a Room (1933) - Undertaker (uncredited)
- Kid Millions (1934) - Recorder (uncredited)
- The Mighty Barnum (1934) - Grocer in Montage (uncredited)
- I'll Love You Always (1935) - (uncredited)
- Party Wire (1935) - Townsman (uncredited)
- We're in the Money (1935) - Member of the Jury (uncredited)
- She Couldn't Take It (1935) - Judge (uncredited)
- The Rainmakers (1935) - Townsman (uncredited)
- Flash Gordon (1936, Serial) - High Priest #1 (uncredited)
- The Witness Chair (1936) - Juror (uncredited)
- Let's Sing Again (1936) - (uncredited)
- Bullets or Ballots (1936) - Grand Jury Member (uncredited)
- The White Angel (1936) - Minor Role (uncredited)
- Come and Get It (1936) - Lumberjack (uncredited)
- You Only Live Once (1937) - Halsey (uncredited)
- The Toast of New York (1937) - Mountaineer (uncredited)
- The Texans (1938) - Moody Citizen (uncredited)
- The Adventures of Tom Sawyer (1938) - Bit (uncredited)
- The Great Victor Herbert (1939) - Grouchy Man (uncredited)
- The House of the Seven Gables (1940) - Juror (uncredited)
- Murder in the Air (1940) - Morgue Attendant (uncredited)
- Back in the Saddle (1941) - George C. Joy (uncredited)
- Marry the Boss's Daughter (1941) - Thorndike Beamish (uncredited)
- Sullivan's Travels (1941) - Convict Watching Movie in Church (uncredited)
- I Married an Angel (1942) - Mr. Dodder (uncredited)
- Mrs. Wiggs of the Cabbage Patch (1942) - Cabbage Patch Character (uncredited)
- This Land Is Mine (1943) - Old Man (uncredited)
- The More the Merrier (1943) - Sleeper (uncredited)
- The Great John L. (1945) - Health Restaurateur (uncredited)
- The Desert Horseman (1946) - Café Patron (uncredited)
- Joan of Arc (1948) - Guillaume Colles (uncredited)
- Madame Bovary (1949) - Guest (uncredited)
- Father's Little Dividend (1951) - Old Man on Porch (uncredited)
