= The Phantom Cowboy (1935 film) =

1935 film

- Directed by: Robert J. Horner
- Written by: Carl Krusada
- Produced by: Nathan Hirsh
- Starring: Ted Wells; George Chesebro; Jimmy Aubrey
- Cinematography: Frank Bender
- Edited by: Sam Hasbold; Clark Russell
- Production company: Aywon Films
- Distributed by: Aywon Films
- Release date: April 1935
- Running time: 55 minutes
- Country: United States
- Language: English

The Phantom Cowboy is a 1935 American Western film directed by Robert J. Horner and starring Ted Wells, George Chesebro and Jimmy Aubrey.

== Plot ==
The Phantom Cowboy holds up a stage, when one man pulls his gun, the Phantom Cowboy shoots him, spooking the four horses pulling the stage with a girl still inside. The runaway stage passes Bill Collins and his sidekick, "Ptomaine Pete". Pete says, "That looks like a runaway," Bill replies, "That is a runaway." Bill is able to jump from his horse to one of the horses pulling the stage and meets Ruth Rogers, who is on her way, with her brother Jack to Kansas City to teach school there.

Bill and Pete need a bath and upon entering some water, the Phantom Cowboy swipes their duds and horses, leaving them with only their boots and underwear. Bill tells Pete, "We're going to have to start hoofing-it." When they see a buckboard approaching, they get behind some bushes and holler at the lady driver, "Hey, lady, can you give us a lift into town?" She says, "Sure, hop on the back." When they approach in their BVD's she says, "Oh no," and drives off with them chasing behind. They finally see a cabin and can smell bacon. The stranger offers them a handout if they set the table.

The stranger with the bacon turns out to be the Phantom, Jim Russell, an exact double for Bill, with a $1,000.00 price on his head, dead or alive. Russell, an honest prospector by trade, has been watched and trailed by a gang of killing claim jumpers for weeks. Russell fears Buck Houston the most, the pirate of the El Dorado Saloon. Russell confides in Bill and Pete, offering to pay them well to spend four days and nights circulating gathering information in Canyon City.

== Cast ==
- Ted Wells as Bill Collins / Jim Russell (The Phantom Rider)
- Doris Brook as Ruth Rogers
- George Chesebro as Buck Houston
- Jimmy Aubrey as Ptomaine Pete
- Richard Cramer as Hank Morgan
- Lew Meehan as Crooked Foreman Mason
- Frank Clark as Sheriff
- James Sheridan as Jack Rogers
- Rosamond Wagman as Rancher's Daughter
