= The Ridin' Demon =

1929 film by Ray Taylor

- Theatrical release poster
- Directed by: Ray Taylor
- Written by: Basil Dickey
- Produced by: William Lord Wright
- Starring: Ted Wells; Kathleen Collins; Lucy Beaumont
- Cinematography: Joseph Brotherton
- Edited by: Gene Havlick
- Production company: Universal Pictures
- Distributed by: Universal Pictures
- Release date: August 18, 1929
- Running time: 5 reels
- Country: United States
- Language: Silent (English intertitles)

The Ridin' Demon is a lost American 1929 Western film directed by Ray Taylor and starring Ted Wells and Kathleen Collins. It was written by Basil Dickey, and was produced and distributed by Universal Pictures.

== Plot ==
The entry for the film at the Library of Congress Motion Picture Copyright Descriptions collection reads:

Pat Riordan, long absent from home and known as The Ridin' Demon, sauntered into the saloon in Gunsight. Sitting in on a card game, he was caught cheating. A fight ensued but Pat,although slightly wounded, managed to escape. Stopping at a secluded stream to bathe his wound, he encountered a charming girl having a refreshing dip. Marie Devon quickly retreated but when she discovered the stranger was wounded, came to his assistance.

Meanwhile Dan Riordan, Pat's twin brother, riding toward town, ran into the sheriff and learned he was looking for a man who greatly resembled Dan. Realizing they were trailing his ne'er-do-well brother, Dan rode anxiously on. Suddenly he came upon Pat and Marie. Explanations were in order for Marie, who was Dan’s sweetheart, had never heard of Pat. Between them they managed to get Pat home,where his devoted and unsuspecting mother was awaiting a long promised visit from him.

News came to the sheriff of Pat's whereabouts and after nightfall he came after him. Dan, wishing to protect his brother, exchanged clothes with him and lead the sheriff a merry chase while Marie rode at top speed and showed Pat a shortcut to the border.Success crowned their efforts and Marie and Dan were able to preserve the illusions of a loving mother.

== Cast ==
- Ted Wells as Dan/Pat Riordan
- Kathleen Collins as Marie
- Lucy Beaumont as Mrs. Riordan
- Otto Bibber as Sheriff

== Reception ==
The Film Daily wrote: "This is all right for the kids and the rabid western fans, who may be concerned only with feats of horsemanship, but the picture will need help on the program to get it over. Wells is good in the dual role, although the double exposure shots are not so convincing. .. Direction: fairly good."

Billboard criticized the lack of a story and slow action, calling it "worthy only as a grind's last resort".

Kine Weekly wrote: "A slight but pleasant story incorporated with action and skilled riding affords a useful 'Western' for popular halls. ... Ted Wells, scarcely equal perhaps to getting the most out of a dual role, is successful as the manly cowboy. Kathleen Collins is an attractive heroine, while Lucy Beaumont makes a sympathetic screen mother. Considering the slightness of the plot, it has been convincingly presented."

== Preservation status ==
According to the Library of Congress, the film is lost.
