= Straight Shootin' =

1927 film

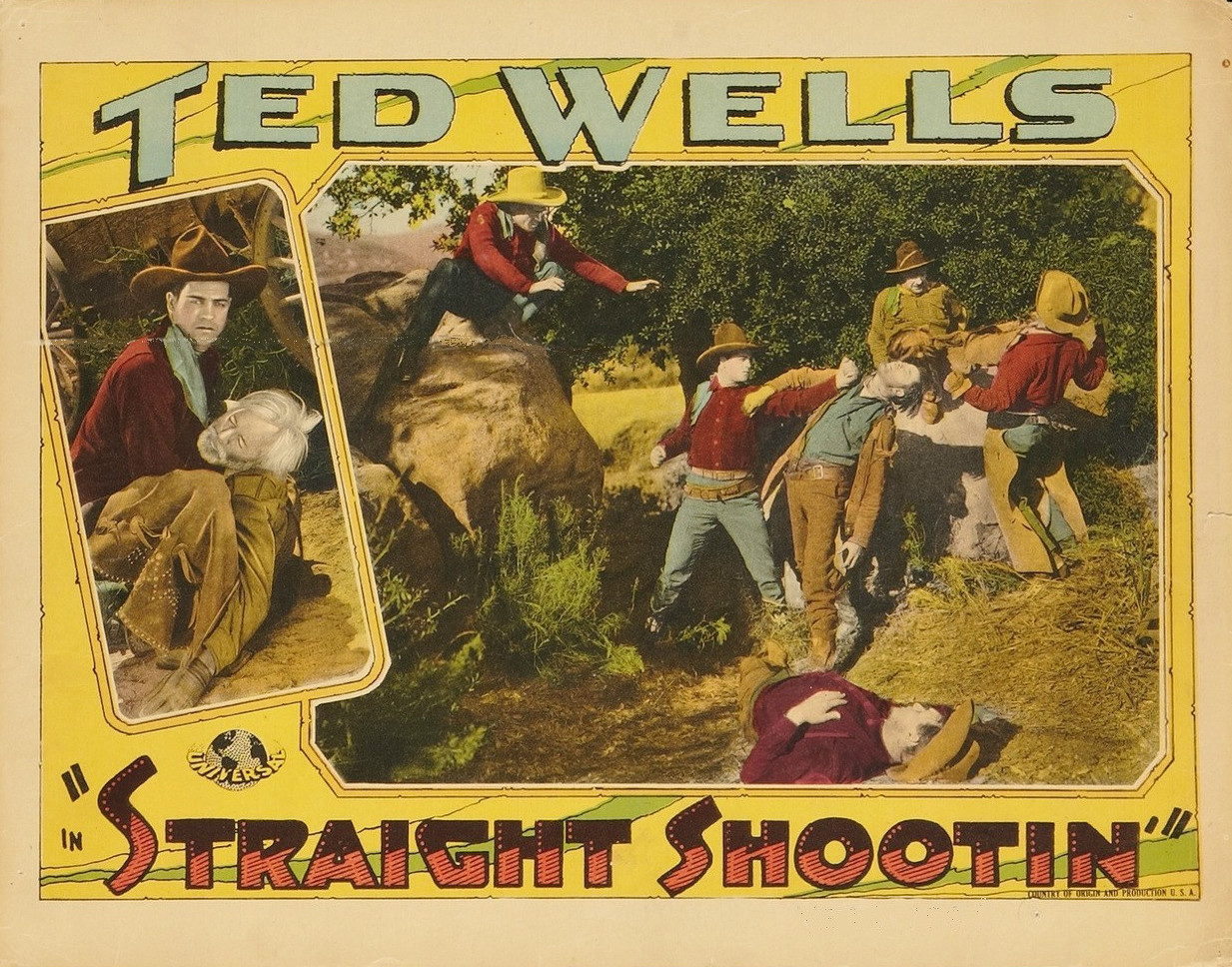
- Straight Shootin'
- Directed by: William Wyler
- Written by: William Berke (as William Lester); Gardner Bradford (titles)
- Produced by: Carl Laemmle
- Starring: Ted Wells, Lillian Gilmore
- Cinematography: Milton Bridenbecker
- Distributed by: Universal Pictures
- Release date: April 1, 1927
- Country: United States
- Languages: Silent; English intertitles

Straight Shootin' is a 1927 American silent Western film directed by William Wyler. It is a silent five-reel Western released by Universal Pictures as part of their Blue Streak Series.

== Cast ==
- Ted Wells as Jack Roberts
- Garry O'Dell as Malpai Joe
- Buck Connors as John Hale
- Lillian Gilmore as Bess Hale
- Joseph Bennett as Tom Hale
- Wilbur Mack as 'Black' Brody
- Al Ferguson as Sheriff
