= David S. Garber =

American art director

- Born: October 9, 1898; Floyd Knobs, Indiana, United States
- Died: March 30, 1984 (aged 85); Los Angeles, California, United States
- Occupation: Art Director
- Years active: 1926–1957 (film)

David S. Garber (1898–1984) was an American art director. He designed the sets for more than sixty film productions between 1926 and 1957, a large number of them westerns.

== Selected filmography ==
- Fighting with Buffalo Bill (1926)
- The Denver Dude (1927)
- Desert Dust (1927)
- The Fighting Three (1927)
- Hard Fists (1927)
- Thunder Riders (1928)
- The Mounted Stranger (1930)
- 70,000 Witnesses (1932)
- I Love That Man (1933)
- Private Scandal (1934)
- Gift of Gab (1934)
- Here Comes the Groom (1934)
- Nevada (1935)
- Rocky Mountain Mystery (1935)
- Desert Gold (1936)
- Drift Fence (1936)
- The Halliday Brand (1957)

== Bibliography ==
- Roy Kinnard & Tony Crnkovich. The Films of Fay Wray. McFarland, 2015.
