= Parks Jones =

American silent film actor

- Born: James Parks Jones; August 22, 1890; Cincinnati, Ohio, USA
- Died: January 11, 1950 (aged 59); Los Angeles, California, USA
- Occupation: Actor
- Years active: 1915-1929
- Spouse: Myrtle Gonzalez (m. 1910; div. 1914)
- Children: 1

James Parks Jones (1890 – January 11, 1950) was an actor in many silent films in the United States. His roles included many leading and supporting roles over more than a decade.

He was born in Cincinnati.

Jones married Myrtle Gonzalez, a Latin American actress, in 1910. They had one son together, James Parks Jones, Jr. (c. 1911–1970), before divorcing.

== Filmography ==
- The Arab (1915 film) (1915)
- Young Romance (1915 film) (1915)
- The Trail of the Lonesome Pine (1916)
- Alien Souls (1916)
- The Lonesome Chap (1917)
- The Evil Eye (1917)
- Such a Little Pirate (1918)
- Sandy (1918 film) (1918)
- The Whispering Chorus (1918)
- Till I Come Back to You (1918)
- Old Wives for New (1918)
- A Dog's Life (1918), a Charlie Chaplin film
- Shoulder Arms (1918)
- The Intrusion of Isabel (1919)
- Sunnside (1919), a Chaplin film
- Deliverance (1919)
- The Black Gate (1919)
- Faith (1920)
- Perils of Paul or the Duchess at Bay, also known as Paul's Peril, (1920)
- The Little Shepherd of Kingdom Come (1920)
- The Old Nest (1921)
- Hawk of the Hills (1927), a serial
- Salvation Jane (film) (1927)
