= The Last Rebel (1918 film) =

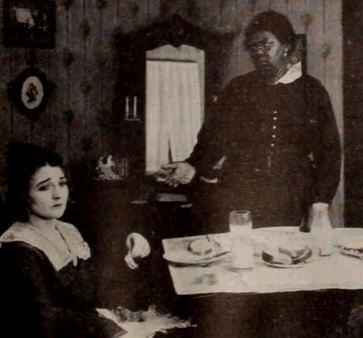
- Still showing Belle Bennett and Lucretia Harris
- Directed by: Gilbert P. Hamilton
- Written by: George Elwood Jenks (scenario)
- Based on: a story by Hapsburg Liebe
- Starring: Belle Bennett; Lillian Langdon
- Cinematography: Jack MacKenzie
- Distributed by: Triangle Distributing
- Release date: June 9, 1918
- Running time: 5 reels
- Country: USA
- Language: Silent..English titles

The Last Rebel is a film from 1918. It stars Belle Bennett, Joe King and Walt Whitman. The film was directed by Gilbert P. Hamilton from a screenplay by George Elwood Jenks. It is a Triangle Film Corporation production. The plot is set during the American Civil War era and features lovers divided by the war. It is a five-reel picture and is considered lost. It was released June 8, 1918. The film stars Belle Bennett and Walt Whitman. Lillian Langdon, Joe Bennett, and Lucretia Harris were also part of the cast.

== Cast ==
- Belle Bennett as Cora Batesford/Floribel Batesford
- Walt Whitman as Colonel Batesford
- Lillian Langdon - Mrs. Batesford
- Joseph Bennett as Jack Batesford
- Joe King as Harry Apperson/Lucky Jim Apperson
- Jack Curtis as Pensinger Gale
- Lucretia Harris as Mammy Lulu
- Anna Dodge as Landlady

== See also ==
- List of films and television shows about the American Civil War
