= The Mounted Stranger =

1930 film

- Directed by: Arthur Rosson
- Screenplay by: Arthur Rosson
- Produced by: Hoot Gibson
- Starring: Hoot Gibson; Buddy Hunter; Milton Brown; Fred Burns; Jim Corey; Francis Ford
- Cinematography: Harry Neumann
- Edited by: Gilmore Walker
- Production company: Universal Pictures
- Distributed by: Universal Pictures
- Release date: February 8, 1930
- Running time: 66 minutes
- Country: United States
- Language: English

The Mounted Stranger is a 1930 American pre-Code Western film. It was a remake of The Ridin' Kid from Powder River (1924), which was an adaptation of Henry Herbert Knibbs' novel of the same name.

== Plot ==
Pete Ainslee locates Steve Gary, who killed Ainslee's father when Ainslee was a child and a witness to the murder. The adult Ainslee wounds Gary in a gunfight, but he becomes the hunted one after Gary recovers.

== Cast ==
- Hoot Gibson as Pete Ainslee aka The Ridin' Kid
- Buddy Hunter as Pete as a boy
- Milton Brown as 'Pop' Ainslee
- Fred Burns as Steve Gary
- Jim Corey as 'White-Eye'
- Francis Ford as 'Spider' Coy
- Walter Patterson as Spider's lookout
- Francelia Billington as Mrs. Coy
- Louise Lorraine as Bonita Coy

== Production ==
The Mounted Stranger was written and directed by Arthur Rosson. It was released on February 8, 1930, by Universal Pictures. Harry Neumann was the cinematographer, and Gibson was the producer. Henry H. Knibbs was the author, and Gilmore Walker was the editor. The film's sets were designed by art director David S. Garber.
