= Ted Wells (actor) =

American actor and stuntman (1899–1948)

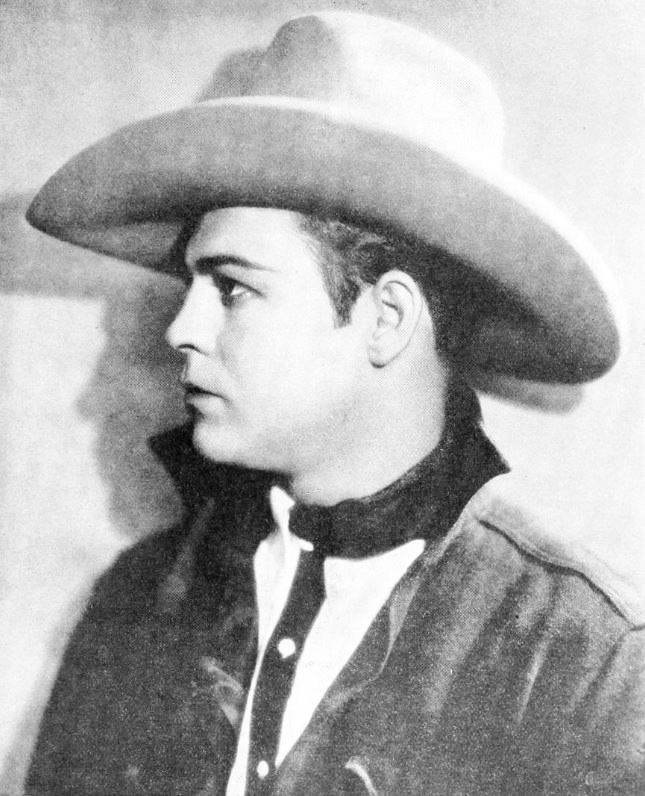
- From a 1927 magazine
- Born: July 11, 1899; Midland, Texas, United States
- Died: June 7, 1948 (aged 48); Wickenburg, Arizona, United States
- Occupation: Actor
- Years active: 1925–1945 (film)

Ted Wells (1899–1948) was an American actor and stuntman active mainly in westerns.

== Selected filmography ==
- Fangs of Fate (1925)
- Desert Dust (1927)
- Straight Shootin' (1927)
- Across the Plains (1928)
- Thunder Riders (1928)
- Beauty and Bullets (1928)
- Grit Wins (1928)
- Cheyenne Trails (1928)
- Greased Lightning (1928)
- The Crimson Canyon (1928)
- The Smiling Terror (1929)
- The Ridin' Demon (1929)
- Born to the Saddle (1929)
- The Phantom Cowboy (1935)
- West of Carson City (1940)
- Tucson Raiders (1944)

== Bibliography ==
- Michael R. Pitts. Poverty Row Studios, 1929–1940: An Illustrated History of 55 Independent Film Companies, with a Filmography for Each. McFarland & Company, 2005.
