= Desert Gold (1936 film) =

1936 film

- Film poster
- Directed by: James P. Hogan
- Written by: Zane Grey (novel); Stuart Anthony (screenplay) and Robert Yost (screenplay)
- Produced by: Harold Hurley (producer); William T. Lackey (associate producer)
- Starring: See below
- Cinematography: George T. Clemens
- Edited by: Chandler House
- Distributed by: Paramount Pictures
- Release date: March 27, 1936
- Running time: 58 minutes
- Country: United States
- Language: English

Desert Gold, later reissued as Desert Storm, is a 1936 American Western film directed by James P. Hogan, starring Buster Crabbe and Marsha Hunt, based on the 1913 Zane Grey novel of the same name and released by Paramount Pictures. The film's sets were designed by David S. Garber, overseen by Hans Dreier.

== Cast ==
- Buster Crabbe as Chief Moya
- Robert Cummings as Fordyce "Ford" Mortimer
- Marsha Hunt as Judith "Judy" Belding
- Tom Keene as Randolph Gale
- Leif Erickson as Glenn Kasedon
- Monte Blue as Chetley "Chet" Kasedon
- Raymond Hatton as Doc Belding
- Walter Miller as Henchman Hank Ladd
- Frank Mayo as Henchman Bert Lash

== Reception ==
The Los Angeles Times said "it is all well done."

== Censorship ==
Before Desert Gold could be exhibited in Kansas, the Kansas Board of Review required the shortening of a whipping scene and the eliminations of closeups where an Indian is tied to a post.
