= Elope If You Must =

1922 film

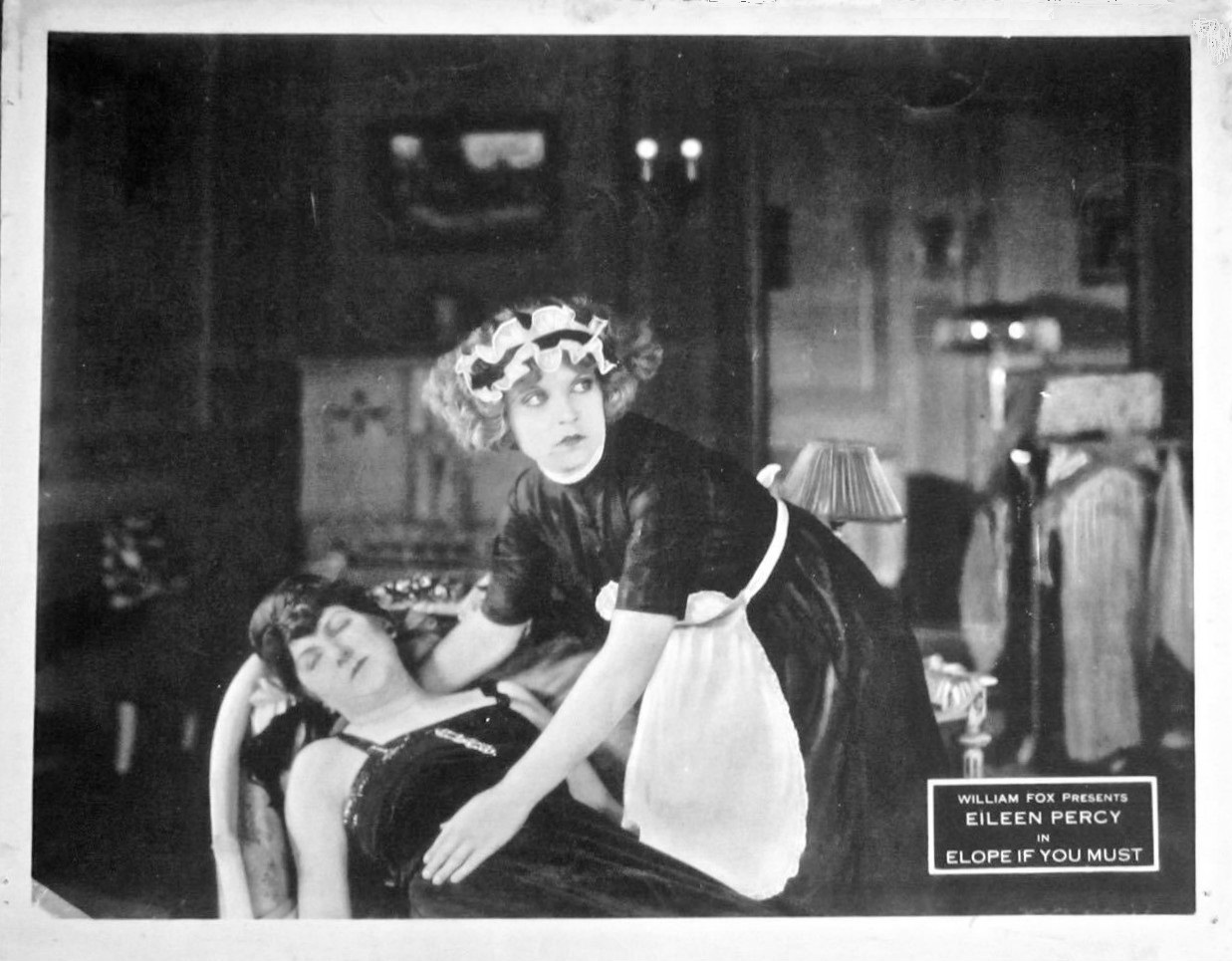
- Lobby card
- Directed by: C.R. Wallace
- Screenplay by: Joseph F. Poland
- Based on: Elope If You Must by E. J. Rath
- Starring: Eileen Percy; A. Edward Sutherland; Joseph Bennett; Mildred Davenport; Mary Huntress; Harvey Clark
- Cinematography: Otto Brautigan
- Production company: Fox Film Corporation
- Distributed by: Fox Film Corporation
- Release date: April 2, 1922
- Running time: 50 minutes
- Country: United States
- Language: English

Elope If You Must is a 1922 American comedy film directed by C.R. Wallace and written by Joseph F. Poland. The film stars Eileen Percy, A. Edward Sutherland, Joseph Bennett, Mildred Davenport, Mary Huntress and Harvey Clark. The film was released on April 2, 1922, by Fox Film Corporation.

== Cast ==
- Eileen Percy as Nancy Moore
- A. Edward Sutherland as Jazz Hennessy
- Joseph Bennett as Willie Weems
- Mildred Davenport as Elizabeth Magruder
- Mary Huntress as Mrs. Magruder
- Harvey Clark as Mr. Magruder
- Larry Steers as Warren Holt
