= The Halliday Brand =

1957 film

- Theatrical poster
- Directed by: Joseph H. Lewis
- Written by: George W. George; George F. Slavin
- Produced by: Robert Eggenweiler; Collier Young
- Starring: Joseph Cotten
- Cinematography: Ray Rennahan
- Edited by: Michael Luciano; Stuart O'Brien
- Distributed by: United Artists
- Release date: January 1957
- Running time: 79 minutes
- Country: United States
- Language: English

The Halliday Brand is a 1957 American Western film directed by Joseph H. Lewis and starring Joseph Cotten. The film's sets were designed by the art director David S. Garber. It was shot partly at the Corriganville Movie Ranch.

== Plot ==
Clay Halliday meets up with his estranged brother Daniel to tell him that their father, Big Dan, is dying and that Clay is engaged to Aleta Burris. Daniel is surprised to hear that their father would give his blessing to the engagement. When they return to the ranch, there are obvious sparks between Daniel and Aleta.

Before he enters his father's room, Daniel has a flashback remembering the time before they became estranged. His father is a lawman. He finds out that his daughter, Martha, is in love with Jivaro Burris (Aleta's brother), a half-breed who works on the Halliday ranch. Big Dan orders Jivaro off the ranch. When a rider is attacked and killed, Jivaro is also attacked as he happened to be riding in the vicinity. Big Dan arrests Jivaro and puts him in jail.

Big Dan leaves with a posse to hunt down the rest of the suspected attackers despite a plea from Daniel to, leaving his son Clay as the only deputy to guard Jivaro despite an angry mob outside the jail. Daniel and Clay try to help Jivaro escape but the mob enters and he is lynched.

Daniel leaves the ranch vowing never to return and goes to Aleta's home to say goodbye. Her father, Chad Burris, overhears Daniel and Aleta saying that they should not tell him about Big Dan's role in the lynching. Big Dan and Clay go to the Burris ranch. A face-off between Big Dan and Mr. Burris occurs with Big Dan killing Burris.

After the funeral for both Burris men, Daniel again leaves. Martha brings Aleta to the Halliday ranch to recover from an illness following the burials. Clay begins to fall in love with Aleta.

Several unusual events happen to the Halliday ranch, all caused by Daniel, including a stampede of Halliday's cattle. Big Dan forms a posse to hunt for Daniel, who he knows is behind the stampede. Big Dan finds a noose hanging inside his house, sets fire to a barn, and writes a threatening note about getting rid of Big Dan as a lawman. Daniel who is hiding in the shadows when the barn burns meets up with Aleta and they embrace for the first time. Aleta tells him that Daniel is becoming like his father.

The townsfolk ask Big Dan to hand in his badge, but he refuses. Daniel confronts his father and they brawl with Daniel coming out on top.

We learn that six months have passed. Daniel flashes forward and enters Big Dan's room where he tells him he is glad that things have changed-that he has given approval for Clay to marry Aleta (a half-breed). Big Dan tells him he lied to get him to come back and draws a gun on Daniel threatening to kill him. Martha comes in and takes away the gun. Daniel, Martha, Clay, and Aleta all leave the room in disgust. Big Dan crawls out of bed to get his gun and staggers out to shoot Daniel. Daniel stands up to him and challenges him to shoot him. Big Dan relents and does not shoot saying that Daniel is too much like him. He dies in Daniel's arms.

== Cast ==
- Joseph Cotten as Daniel Halliday
- Viveca Lindfors as Aleta Burris
- Betsy Blair as Martha Halliday
- Ward Bond as Big Dan Halliday
- Bill Williams as Clay Halliday
- Jay C. Flippen as Chad Burris
- Christopher Dark as Jivaro Burris
- Jeanette Nolan as Nante
- Peter Ortiz as Manuel

== See also ==
- List of American films of 1957
