= The Black Gate (film) =

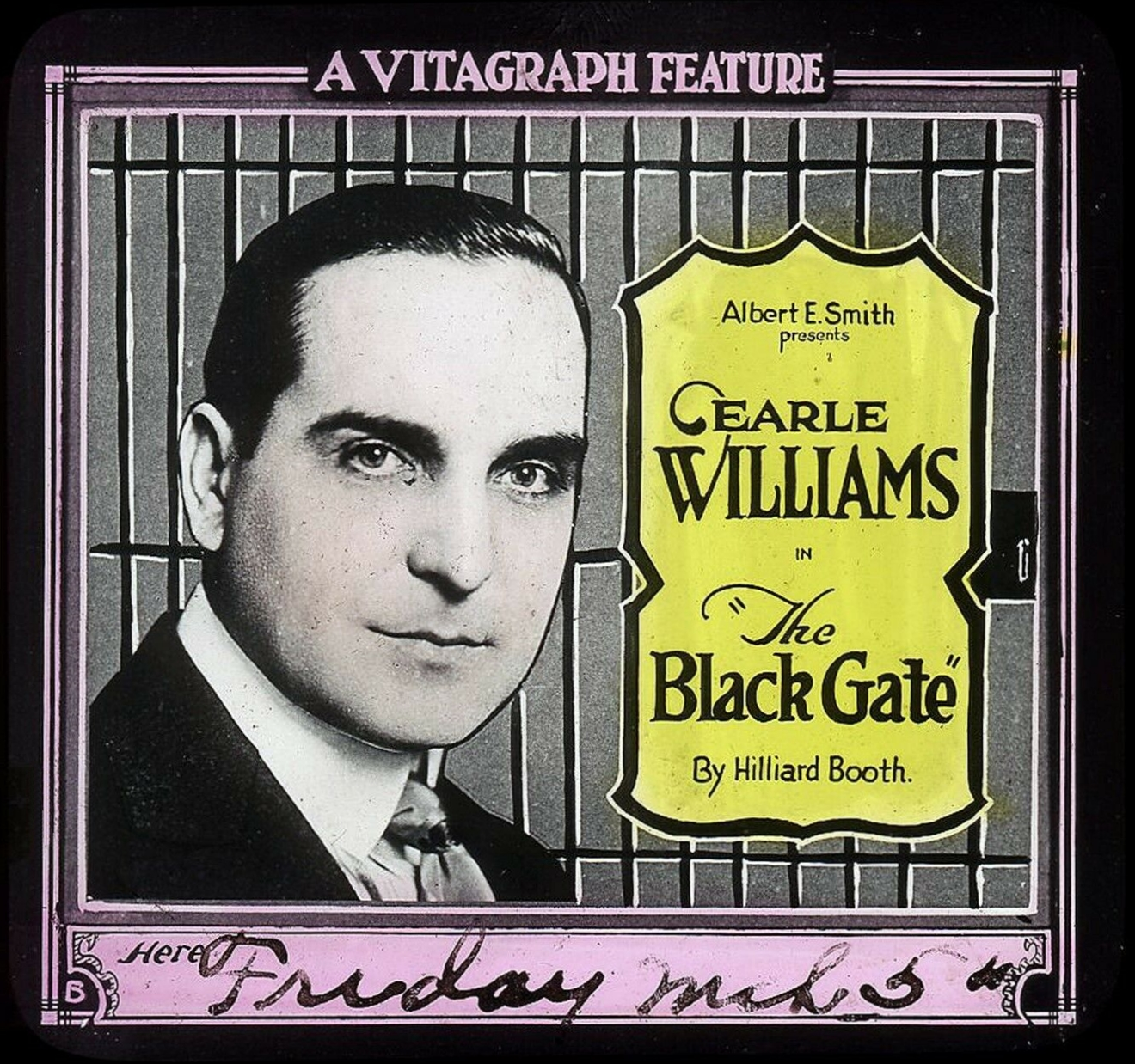
- Lantern slide
- Directed by: Theodore Marston
- Written by: Lucien Hubbard
- Story by: Hilliard Booth
- Starring: Earle Williams; Ruth Clifford; Harry Spingler; J. Parks Jones; Clarissa Selwynne
- Production company: Vitagraph Company of America
- Distributed by: Vitagraph Company of America
- Release date: November 1919
- Running time: 5 reels
- Country: United States
- Languages: Silent film (English intertitles)

The Black Gate is a 1919 American silent mystery film directed by Theodore Marston and starring Earle Williams, Ruth Clifford, Harry Spingler, J. Parks Jones, and Clarissa Selwynne. The film was released by Vitagraph Company of America in November 1919.

== Cast ==
- Earle Williams as Shaler Spencer
- Ruth Clifford as Vera Hampton
- Harry Spingler as Wade DeForrest
- J. Parks Jones as Rod Spencer (as Park Jones)
- Clarissa Selwynne as Mrs. DeForrest (as Clarissa Selwyn)
- Brinsley Shaw as Norton
- J. Barney Sherry as Bowen

== Preservation ==
The film is now considered lost.
