= Tucson Raiders =

1944 film by Spencer Gordon Bennet

- Directed by: Spencer Gordon Bennet
- Written by: Joseph O'Donnell (original story), Anthony Coldeway (screenplay), Fred Harman (comic strip)
- Produced by: Edward J. White
- Starring: Wild Bill Elliott
- Cinematography: Reggie Lanning
- Edited by: Harry Keller
- Music by: Joseph Dubin, Mort Glickman, Paul Van Loan
- Distributed by: Republic Pictures
- Release date: 1944
- Running time: 70 minutes (original run time)
- Country: United States
- Language: English

Tucson Raiders is a 1944 American Western film directed by Spencer Gordon Bennet and starring Wild Bill Elliott in the role of Red Ryder. It was the first of twenty-three Red Ryder feature films that would be produced by Republic Pictures. The picture was shot on the studio’s back lot along with outdoor locations at Iverson Ranch, 1 Iverson Lane, Chatsworth, Los Angeles.

== Plot ==
Tucson Raiders is set in 1895’s Painted Valley, Colorado. Wild Bill Elliott, makes his first appearance as Red Ryder and Robert Blake’s first as Little Beaver, Red discovers that he has been framed for murder. His little Indian pal, Little Beaver, manages to foil the corrupt Sheriff Kirk’s (Ed Cassidy) plan to kill Red as he escapes from jail. Hannah Rogers (Ruth Lee) in the pay of Governor York (Stanley Andrews), a dishonest politician, tries to trick Red in escaping jail. However, her scheme fails and Red Ryder shoots his way out. He manages to intercept a payroll robbery but finds that Little Beaver has been captured by the outlaws. The "red headed" cowboy exposes Hannah’s plot, saves Little Beaver and brings an end to Governor York’s gang.

== Cast ==
- Wild Bill Elliott as Red Ryder
- Robert Blake as Little Beaver
- Alice Fleming as The Duchess (Red's Aunt)
- George "Gabby" Hayes as Gabby Hopkins
- Ruth Lee as Hannah Rogers
- Peggy Stewart as Beth Rogers
- LeRoy Mason as Jeff Stark
- Stanley Andrews as Governor York
- John Whitney as Tom Hamilton
- Bud Geary as Deputy One Eye
- Karl Hackett as Reverend George Allen
- Tom Steele as Deputy Logan
- Marshall Reed as Deputy
- Tom Chatterton as Judge James Wayne
- Ed Cassidy as Sheriff Kirk (as Edward Cassidy)
- Foxy Callahan as Stagecoach Guard (uncredited)
- Tommy Coats as Saloon Henchman (uncredited)
- Kenne Duncan as Henchman (voice) (uncredited)
- Fred Graham as Henchman (uncredited)
- Neal Hart as Barfly (uncredited)
- Edward Howard as Deputy Logan (uncredited)
- Jack Kirk as Brawler (voice) (uncredited)
- Bert LeBaron as Rancher (uncredited)
- Tom London as Matthews (voice) (uncredited)
- Frank McCarroll as Henchman (uncredited)
- Post Park as Sam - 1st Stagecoach driver (uncredited)
- Frank Pershing as Townsman (uncredited)
- Charles Sullivan as Bartender (uncredited)
- Ken Terrell as Saloon Henchman (uncredited)
- Ted Wells as Barfly (uncredited)
- Bud Wolfe as Henchman (uncredited)

== Production ==
Tucson Raiders was based on Fred Harman’s comic strip, Red Ryder. It was the first of Republic's Red Ryder feature series and the first to star Wild Bill Elliott as Red Ryder and Robert Blake as Little Beaver. When Eliott was promoted up to the more adult features and replaced by Alan Lane, Blake continued on in the role for the remaining 22 films.

=== Stunts ===
- Yakima Canutt
- Tom Steele
- Bud Geary
- Fred Graham
- Foxy Callahan
- Tommy Coats
- Bert LeBaron
- Carey Loftin
- Frank McCarrol
- Ken Terrel
- Ted Wells
- Joe Yrigoyen
