= Nobody's Fool (1921 film) =

1921 film

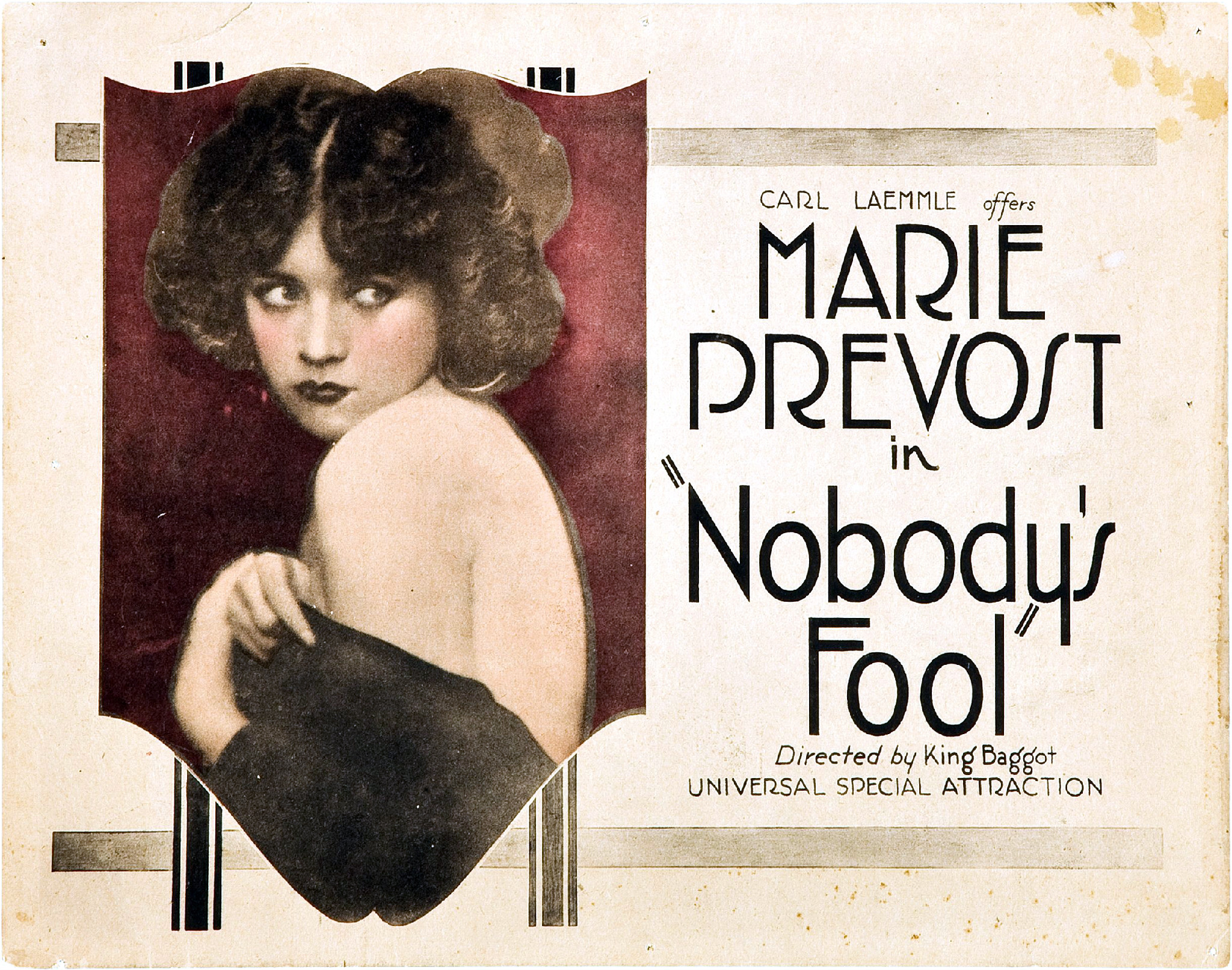
- Directed by: King Baggot
- Written by: Roy Clements; Doris Schroeder
- Starring: Marie Prevost; Helen Harris; Vernon Snively
- Cinematography: Bert Glennon
- Production company: Universal Pictures
- Distributed by: Universal Pictures
- Release date: October 31, 1921
- Country: United States
- Languages: Silent; English intertitles

Nobody's Fool is a 1921 American silent comedy film written and directed by King Baggot and starring Marie Prevost, Helen Harris and Vernon Snively.

== Cast ==
- Marie Prevost as Polly Gordon
- Helen Harris as Mary Hardy
- Vernon Snively as Vincent DePuyster
- R. Henry Guy as Dr. Hardy
- Percy Challenger as Joshua Alger
- Harry Myers as Artemis Alger
- George Kuwa as Ah Gone
- Lucretia Harris as Melinda
- Lydia Yeamans Titus as Housekeeper

== Bibliography ==
- Munden, Kenneth White. The American Film Institute Catalog of Motion Pictures Produced in the United States, Part 1. University of California Press, 1997.
