= Carl Krusada =

Austrian-born American screenwriter

- Born: August 15, 1879; Vienna, Austro-Hungarian Empire
- Died: January 25, 1951 (aged 71); Los Angeles, California, United States
- Other name: Val Cleveland
- Occupation: Screenwriter
- Years active: 1919–1940 (film)

Carl Krusada (1879–1951) was an Austrian-born American screenwriter. He began his career in the silent era, sometimes using the name Val Cleveland. During the 1930s he worked prolifically writing screenplays for B Westerns produced by a variety of Poverty Row companies.

== Selected filmography ==
- The Scoffer (1920)
- White Eagle (1922)
- The Timber Queen (1922)
- Solomon in Society (1922)
- The Truth About Wives (1923)
- Winning a Woman (1925)
- Ridin' Thunder (1925)
- Lorraine of the Lions (1925)
- King of the Saddle (1926)
- The Valley of Bravery (1926)
- The Trail of the Tiger (1927)
- The Arizona Whirlwind (1927)
- The Golden Stallion (1927)
- Heroes of the Wild (1927)
- Three Miles Up (1927)
- Won in the Clouds (1928)
- The Price of Fear (1928)
- The Vanishing Rider (1928)
- How to Handle Women (1928)
- Beauty and Bullets (1928)
- The Gate Crasher (1928)
- The Crimson Canyon (1928)
- Thunder Riders (1928)
- The Sky Skidder (1929)
- The Phantom of the North (1929)
- Grit Wins (1929)
- Eyes of the Underworld (1929)
- Wolves of the City (1929)
- The Smiling Terror (1929)
- Born to the Saddle (1929)
- Beyond the Rio Grande (1930)
- The Phantom of the Desert (1930)
- Slim Fingers (1929)
- Firebrand Jordan (1930)
- Westward Bound (1930)
- Lariats and Six-Shooters (1931)
- 45 Calibre Echo (1932)
- Dance Hall Hostess (1933)
- Ridin' Thru (1934)
- Mystery Ranch (1934)
- Terror of the Plains (1934)
- Fighting Hero (1934)
- Unconquered Bandit (1935)
- The Cactus Kid (1935)
- Silent Valley (1935)
- Texas Jack (1935)
- The Silver Bullet (1935)
- The Laramie Kid (1935)
- North of Arizona (1935)
- Wolf Riders (1935)
- The Live Wire (1935)
- The Phantom Cowboy (1935)
- Loser's End (1935)
- Born to Battle (1935)
- Coyote Trails (1935)
- Skull and Crown (1935)
- Rio Rattler (1935)
- Fast Bullets (1936)
- Santa Fe Bound (1936)
- Fangs of the Wild (1939)
- Law of the Wolf (1939)
- El Diablo Rides (1939)
- Feud of the Range (1939)
- Riders of the Sage (1939)
- The Pal from Texas (1939)
- Pinto Canyon (1940)
- Wild Horse Valley (1940)
- Wild Horse Range (1940)
- Land of the Six Guns (1940)
- The Kid from Santa Fe (1940)
- Riders from Nowhere (1940)
- Broken Strings (1940)

== Bibliography ==
- Munden, Kenneth White. The American Film Institute Catalog of Motion Pictures Produced in the United States, Part 1. University of California Press, 1997.
- Zmuda, Michael. The Five Sedgwicks: Pioneer Entertainers of Vaudeville, Film and Television. McFarland, 2015.
