= A Kentucky Cinderella =

1917 American drama film directed by Rupert Julian

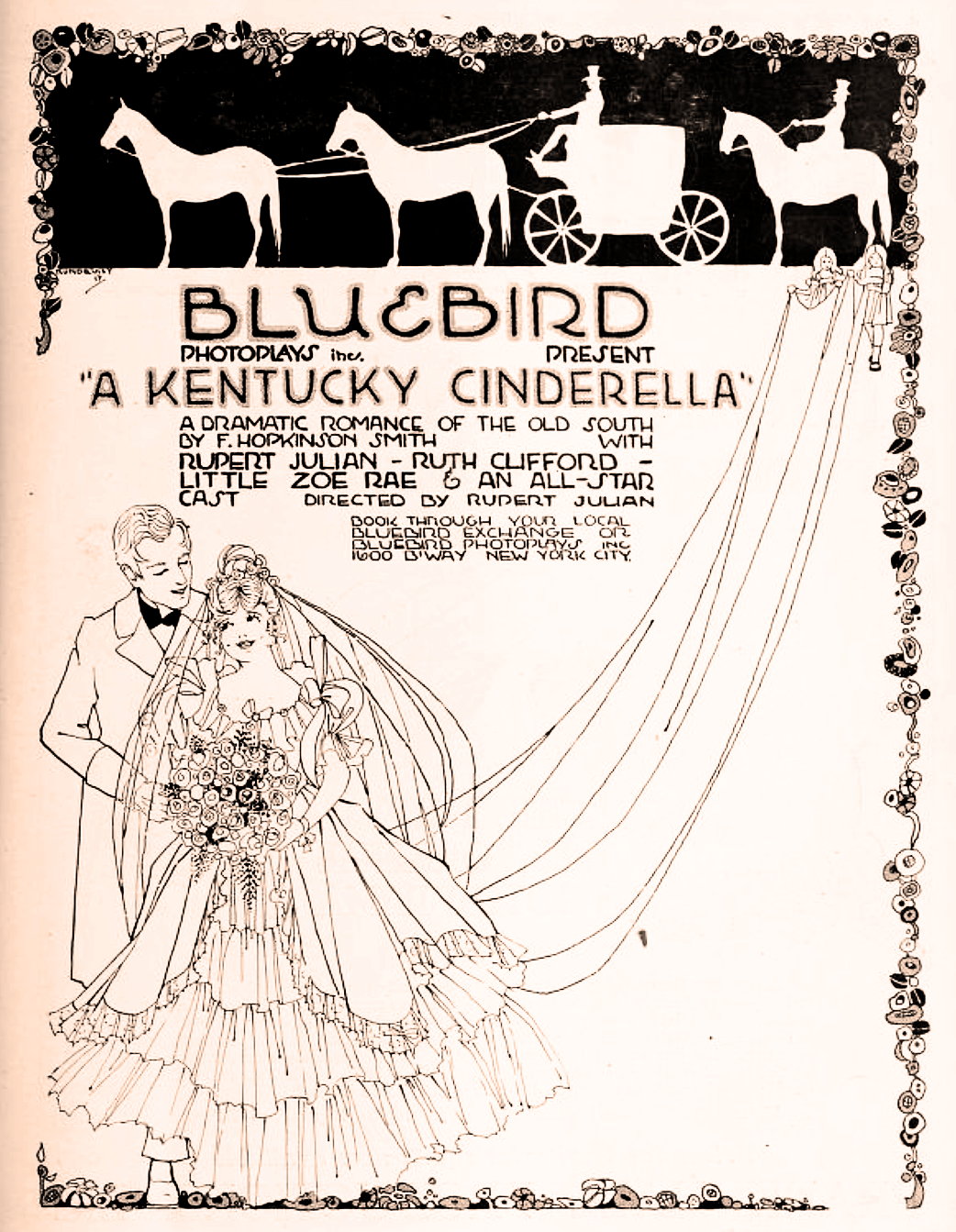
- Moving Picture World Ad
- Directed by: Rupert Julian
- Written by: Francis Hopkinson Smith Story; Elliott J. Clawson scenario
- Produced by: Bluebird Photoplays
- Starring: Ruth Clifford
- Cinematography: Stephen Rounds
- Distributed by: Universal Studios
- Release date: June 25, 1917
- Running time: 5 reels
- Country: United States
- Languages: Silent film English intertitles

A Kentucky Cinderella is a 1917 American silent drama directed by Rupert Julian and featured Rupert Julian and Ruth Clifford, and a cast including child actress Zoe Rae. It was released June 25, 1917 by Bluebird Photoplays, a subsidiary of Universal Studios.

The film was based on an 1898 short story by Francis Hopkinson Smith. The short story first appeared in the Ladies' Home Journal in late 1898. The story was also included in Smith's 1899 short story collection The Other Fellow. The 1921 film Desperate Youth is also based on the same short story.

== Plot ==
This story takes place in the pre-civil war south. When Ed Long (played by Eddie Polo) and his brother Frank (played by Frank Lanning) try to claim-jump a California gold mine owned by "Kentuck" Windfield Gordon (played by Harry Carter) and his partner John Silverwood (played by Rupert Julian). "Kentuck" is killed defending his claim. His daughter Nannie (played by Ruth Clifford) is now an orphan. Silverwood decides to send her to an uncle, Henry Gordon (also played by Harry Carter), living in Kentucky.

After arriving in Kentucky, she finds out uncle Henry has remarried and the new Mrs. Gordon (played by Elsie Jane Wilson) mistreats her when she believes Nannie is competing with her own daughter Rachel (played by Myrtle Reeves). Nannie is asked to leave the house. Aunt Chlorindy (played by Lucretia Harris), the mammy who help raise Nannie when she was a child, helps her find a new home. The new abode is owned by a rich widow Mrs. Morgan (played by Aurora Pratt). While living with Mrs. Morgan she meets Tom Boling, a rich bachelor (played by Emory Johnson). Tom stops pursuing Rachel, starts courting Nannie, they fall in love and decide to get married. During their wedding, Silverwood shows up and announces the California mine has struck the motherlode.

== Cast ==
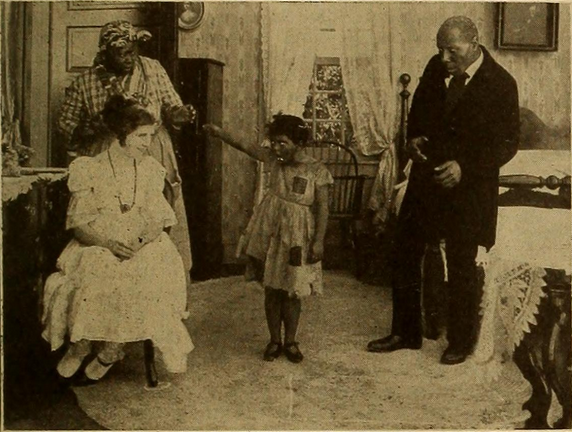
| Actor | Role |
|---|---|
| Rupert Julian | John Silverwood |
| Ruth Clifford | Nannie |
| Emory Johnson | Tom Boling |
| Harry Carter | 'Kentuck' Windfield Gordon and Uncle Henry |
| Eddie Polo | Ed Long |
| Frank Lanning | Frank Long |
| Gretchen Lederer | Miss Morgan |
| Elsie Jane Wilson | Henry's Wife |
| Zoe Rae | Zoe |
| Aurora Pratt | Mrs. Morgan |
| Lucretia Harris | Aunt Chlorindy |
| Myrtle Reeves | Rachel |

== Preservation status ==
According to the Library of Congress website, an incomplete copy of this film survives at the EYE Film Institute Netherlands.

== Bibliography ==
- Gevinson, A.; American Film Institute (1997). Within Our Gates: Ethnicity in American Feature Films, 1911-1960. American Film Institute Catalog. University of California Press. ISBN 978-0-520-20964-0.
