= Thunder Riders (film) =

1928 film

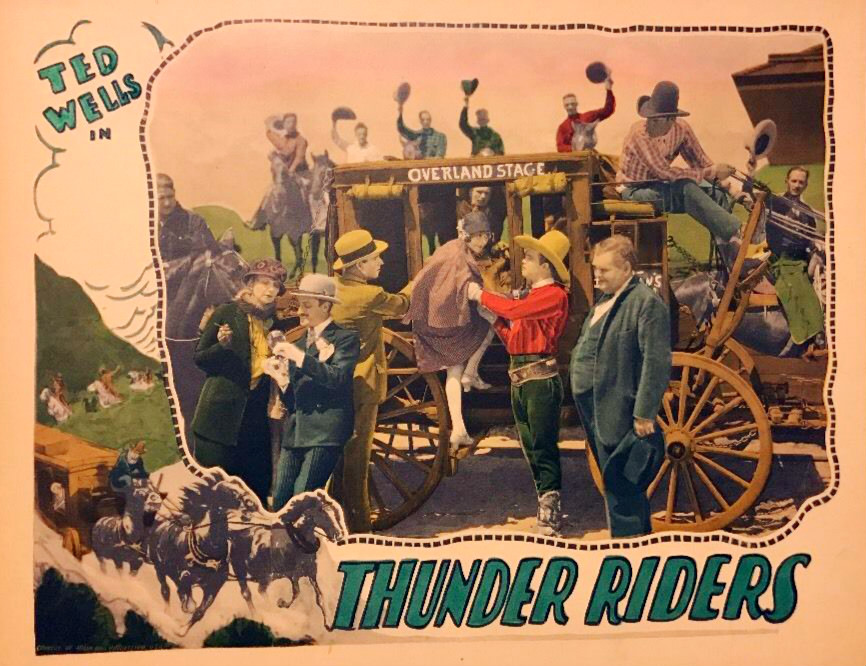
- Lobby card
- Directed by: William Wyler
- Written by: Basil Dickey; Carl Krusada; Gardner Bradford
- Produced by: Carl Laemmle
- Starring: Ted Wells; Charlotte Stevens; William Steele
- Cinematography: Milton Bridenbecker
- Edited by: Harry Marker
- Production company: Universal Pictures
- Distributed by: Universal Pictures
- Release date: August 13, 1928
- Running time: 50 minutes
- Country: United States
- Language: Silent (English intertitles)

Thunder Riders is a 1928 American silent Western film directed by William Wyler and starring Ted Wells, Charlotte Stevens, and William Steele. The film's sets were designed by the art director David S. Garber.

== Plot ==
As described in a film magazine, Betty Barton comes West to claim the ranch and fortune left her by her father, "Pap Streak Barton." Her inheritance has been left in trust with her father's old friend Duncan, who determines to try out the mettle of the young woman he has never seen. Duncan and his son, Jack, plan a reception and entertainment for the Barton party calculated to measure up with an Easterner's ideas of the wild and woolly West. When Betty arrives with her aunt Cythia Straight and Lem Dawson, who aspires to marry her, they are met by a stage coach and a retinue of cowboys. The trip to the ranch is interrupted by an Indian attack, planned by the Duncans, which frightens the Aunt and Percival but delights Betty. During a masqued ball given at the Duncan Ranch for the Bartons, Jack plans to arrive as a bandit and kidnap Betty. Ranch foreman Lon Seeright hears of this and tips off Dawson. When Jack goes to don his bandit's togs he is seized and bound by Dawson's gang and Dawson plays bandit. He makes off with Betty to a cabin in the hills, where he has arranged for a hasty marriage. Not until Jack comes to and frees himself does his father realize that Dawson has tricked them. They pursue Dawson and reach the cabin just in time to save Betty from marriage with Dawson, whom the Sheriff has identified as an escaped convict. Since a wedding is all arranged for Betty and Jack, they decide that there is no time like the present.

== Cast ==
- Ted Wells as Jack Duncan
- Charlotte Stevens as Betty Barton
- William Steele as Lem Dawson
- William J. Dyer as Lon Seeright
- Leo White as Prof. Wilfred Winkle
- Julia Griffith as Cythia Straight
- Bob Burns as Sheriff
- Gilbert Holmes as Rider
- Richard L'Estrange as Rider

== Production ==
Thunder Riders was partially filmed on location at Lone Pine, California.

== Preservation ==
A print of Thunder Riders is listed as being held in the collection of La Cineteca Del Friuli.

== Bibliography ==
- Langman, Larry. A Guide to Silent Westerns. Greenwood Publishing Group, 1992.
