= Joseph Bennett (actor) =

American film actor

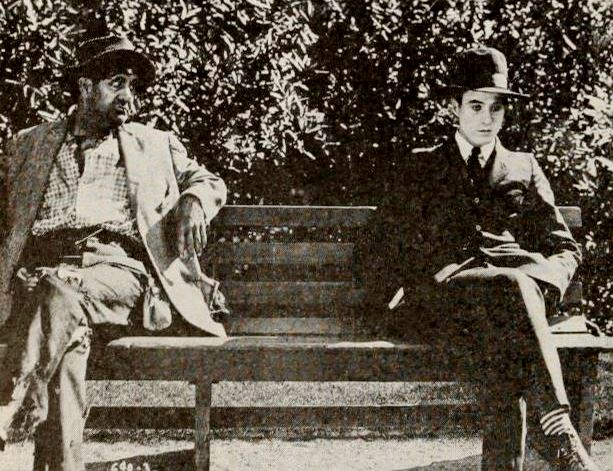
- Bennett (right) in The Golden Fleece (1918)
- Born: August 28, 1894; Los Angeles, California, United States
- Died: December 3, 1931 (aged 37); Hollywood, California, United States
- Other name: Joe Bennett
- Occupation: Actor
- Years active: 1917–1929

Joseph Bennett (1894–1931) was an American film actor of the silent era. He played a mixture of lead and supporting roles for a variety of studios. He was often credited as Joe Bennett.

== Selected filmography ==
- Indiscreet Corinne (1917)
- Limousine Life (1918)
- The Golden Fleece (1918)
- Faith Endurin' (1918)
- The Love Brokers (1918)
- The Last Rebel (1918)
- Marked Cards (1918)
- The Grey Parasol (1918)
- Crown Jewels (1918)
- Man's Desire (1919)
- The Feud (1919)
- The Terror (1920)
- The Gamesters (1920)
- Youth's Desire (1920)
- Their Mutual Child (1920)
- A Daughter of the Law (1921)
- The Home Stretch (1921)
- The Night Horsemen (1921)
- Love Never Dies (1921)
- Elope If You Must (1922)
- Flashing Spurs (1924)
- Trigger Fingers (1924)
- Barbara Frietchie (1924)
- Breed of the Border (1924)
- The Sign of the Claw (1926)
- The Man in the Shadow (1926)
- God's Great Wilderness (1927)
- Men of Daring (1927)
- Three Miles Up (1927)
- Straight Shootin' (1927)
- Somewhere in Sonora (1927)
- Wolf's Trail (1927)
- The Shepherd of the Hills (1928)
- Vultures of the Sea (1928)
- Won in the Clouds (1928)
- The Girl Who Wouldn't Wait (1929)
- The Lariat Kid (1929)
- After the Fog (1929)

== Bibliography ==
- Langman, Larry. American Film Cycles: The Silent Era. Greenwood Publishing, 1998.
- Taves, Brian. P.G. Wodehouse and Hollywood: Screenwriting, Satires and Adaptations. McFarland, 2006.
