= Born to the Saddle (1929 film) =

1929 film

- Directed by: Joseph Levigard
- Screenplay by: George H. Plympton; George Mitchell; Carl Krusada
- Story by: George H. Plympton; George Mitchell
- Starring: Ted Wells; Duane Thompson; Leo White; Byron Douglas; Merrill McCormick; Nelson McDowell
- Cinematography: William S. Adams
- Edited by: Ted J. Kent
- Production company: Universal Pictures
- Distributed by: Universal Pictures
- Release date: March 10, 1929
- Running time: 50 minutes
- Country: United States
- Languages: Silent; English intertitles

Born to the Saddle is a 1929 American silent Western film directed by Joseph Levigard and written by George H. Plympton, George Mitchell and Carl Krusada. The film stars Ted Wells, Duane Thompson, Leo White, Byron Douglas, Merrill McCormick and Nelson McDowell. The film was released on March 10, 1929, by Universal Pictures.

== Cast ==
- Ted Wells as Ted Dorgan
- Duane Thompson as Helen Pearson
- Leo White as Clyde Montmorency Wilpenny
- Byron Douglas as John Pearson
- Merrill McCormick as Amos Judd
- Nelson McDowell as Pop Healy

== Preservation ==
With no holdings located in archives, Born to the Saddle is considered a lost film.
