= Silver Valley (film) =

1927 film

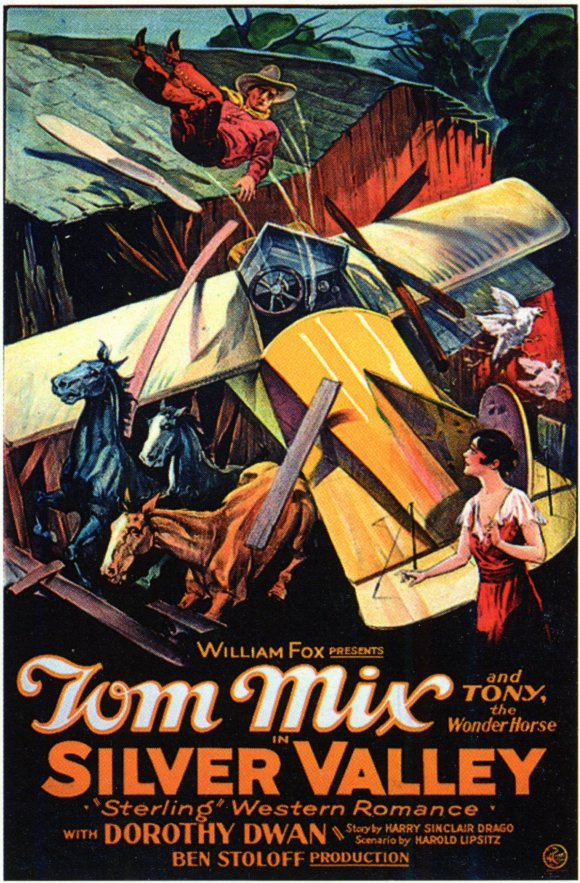
- Theatrical release poster
- Directed by: Benjamin Stoloff
- Screenplay by: Harold B. Lipsitz; Malcolm Stuart Boylan
- Story by: Harry Sinclair Drago
- Starring: Tom Mix; Dorothy Dwan; Philo McCullough; Jocky Hoefli; Tom Kennedy; Lon Poff
- Cinematography: Daniel B. Clark
- Production company: Fox Film Corporation
- Distributed by: Fox Film Corporation
- Release date: October 2, 1927
- Running time: 50 minutes
- Country: United States
- Languages: Silent; English intertitles

Silver Valley is a 1927 American silent Western film directed by Benjamin Stoloff and written by Harold B. Lipsitz and Malcolm Stuart Boylan. The film stars Tom Mix, Dorothy Dwan, Philo McCullough, Jocky Hoefli, Tom Kennedy, and Lon Poff. The film was released on October 2, 1927, by Fox Film Corporation.

== Cast ==
- Tom Mix as Tom Tracey
- Tony the Horse as Tom's Horse
- Dorothy Dwan as Sheila Blaine
- Philo McCullough as 'Black Jack' Lundy
- Jocky Hoefli as The Silent Kid
- Tom Kennedy as 'Hayfever' Hawkins
- Lon Poff as 'Slim' Snitzer
- Harry Dunkinson as Mike McCool
- Clark Comstock as 'Wash' Taylor
