= What Becomes of the Children? (1936 film) =

1936 film

- Directed by: Walter Shumway
- Written by: Corra Beach (novel and adaption)
- Produced by: Roland C. Kennell (associate producer); Anthony Z. Landi (associate producer)
- Starring: See below
- Edited by: Holbrook N. Todd
- Music by: Lee Zahler
- Distributed by: Puritan Pictures
- Release date: December 5, 1936
- Running time: 65 minutes
- Country: United States
- Language: English

What Becomes of the Children? is a 1936 American drama film directed by Walter Shumway.

== Cast ==
- Joan Marsh as Marion Worthington
- Robert Frazer as John Worthington
- Natalie Moorhead as Edith Worthington
- Glen Boles as Fred Worthington
- Claudia Dell as Gayle Adams
- Niles Welch as Thomas Scott
- Barbara Pepper as Elsie
- Larry Kent as Roy Daniels
- Sonny Bupp as Little Freddy Worthington
- Anne Bennett as Little Marion Worthington
- John Elliott as Doctor
- Wilson Benge as Bates
- Margaret Bloodgood as Landlady
- Richard Cramer as Detective
- Mary MacLaren as Gertrude
- Franklyn Farnum as Shelby
- Joseph W. Girard as Detective Chief
