= Lillian Gilmore =

American actress (1909–1982)

- Born: 6 August 1909; New York City
- Died: May 4, 1982 (aged 72); Los Angeles
- Occupation: Actor
- Years active: 1926–1935
- Notable work: The Mojave Kid, Straight Shootin', The Phantom Flyer, Unconquered Bandit, Wolf Riders

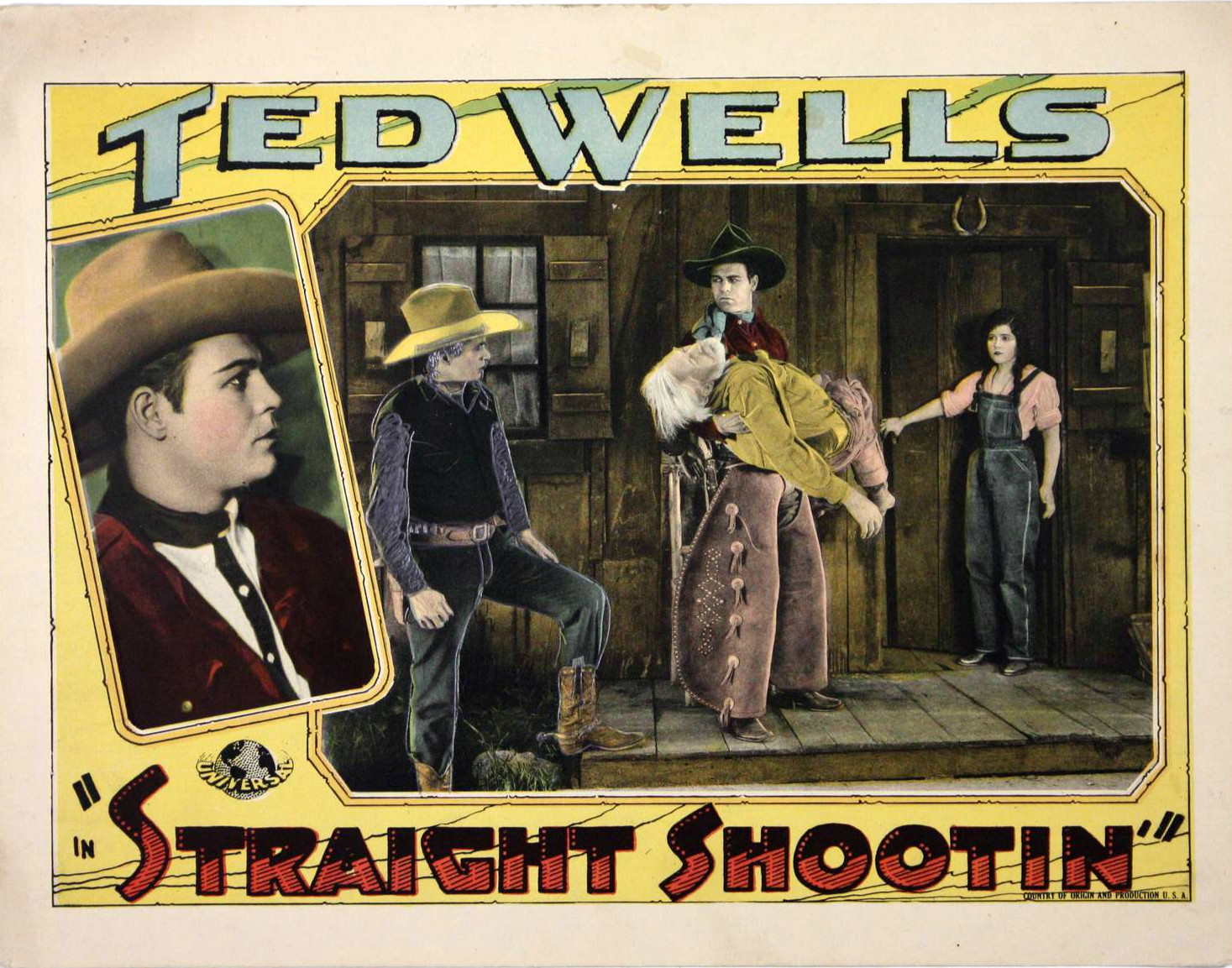
Lobby card for Straight Shootin' (1927), with Gilmore

Lillian Gilmore' (August 6, 1909, New York City – May 4, 1982, Los Angeles) was an American actress of film and stage. She was in five feature films, and five two-reel films.

== Life and career ==
Lillian Gilmore was born on August 6, 1909, in New York City. She was the daughter of character actor and comedian, Barney Gilmore (1865–1949). Her acting career began at age 15 on the stage as "Freda", in Lightnin' (1923), with her father acting as the "Judge". She started film acting in 1926.

Gilmore was featured in an advertisement for Princess Pat's cosmetic powder in 1928, in Woman's Home Companion. Gilmore was cast as the female lead "Zitla" in the Mayan-themed musical theater production of The Drums of Sacrifice, (1935) at the Greek Theater in Griffith Park, Los Angeles.

== Filmography ==
- Home Sweet Home (1926)
- The Mojave Kid (1927) as Thelma Vaddez
- Straight Shootin' (1927) as Bess Hale
- The Fighting Texan (1927), short film
- The Death's Head (1928), short film
- A Romeo of the Range (1928), short film
- The Boundary Battle (1928), short film
- Buckskin Days (1928), short film
- The Phantom Flyer (1928) as Mary Crandall
- The Forest Ranger (1928), episode 3, Universal Pictures television series
- Rawhide Mail (1934) as Nora Hastings
- Unconquered Bandit (1935) as Helen Cleyburn
- Wolf Riders (1935) as Mary Clark
