= Lucretia Harris =

American actress

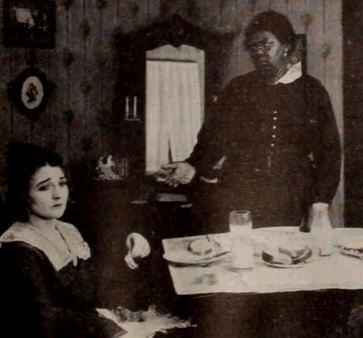
Still showing Belle Bennett and Lucretia Harris in The Last Rebel (1918)

Lucretia Harris, also known as Lucretia Williams and Lucretia B. H. Rogers, (1873 or 1874 - July 27, 1923) was an actress in the United States. An African American, she had supporting roles during the silent film era. She featured in The Adventures and Emotions of Edgar Pomeroy series of comedy shorts from 1920 until 1921.

Her roles included portraying a mammy in multiple films, a cook, and a maid in the Edgar series.

She was from Alabama. She is buried in the Angelus-Rosedale Cemetery in Los Angeles.

== Filmography ==
- A Kentucky Cinderella (1917) as Aunt Chlorindy
- The Captain of His Soul (1918)
- The Last Rebel (1918 film)
- Creaking Stairs (1919)
- The Feud (1919 film) as Nancy
- The Intrusion of Isabel (1919) as Mammy Johnson
- Edgar and the Teacher's Pet (1920)*short
- Edgar's Hamlet (1920)*short
- Edgar's Jonah Day (1920)*short
- Edgar Takes the Cake (1920)*short
- Edgar's Sunday Courtship (1920)*short
- Edgar Camps Out (1920)*short
- Edgar's Little Saw (1920)*short
- Edgar, the Explorer (1920)*short
- Edgar's Country Cousin (1921)*short
- Edgar's Feast Day (1921)*short
- Desperate Youth (1921)
- Edgar, the Detective (1921) *short
- Nobody's Fool (1921 film) as Melinda
- The Forgotten Law (1922) as Mammy Cely
- Human Hearts (1922) as Carolina
