= Unconquered Bandit =

1935 film directed by Harry S. Webb

- Directed by: Harry S. Webb
- Written by: Carl Krusada; Lewie C. Borden; Rose Gordon
- Produced by: Bernard B. Ray; Harry S. Webb
- Starring: Tom Tyler; Lillian Gilmore; Slim Whitaker
- Cinematography: J. Henry Kruse
- Edited by: Fred Bain
- Production company: Reliable Pictures
- Distributed by: Reliable Pictures
- Release date: January 8, 1935
- Running time: 59 minutes
- Country: United States
- Language: English

Unconquered Bandit is a 1935 American Western film directed by Harry S. Webb and starring Tom Tyler, Lillian Gilmore and Slim Whitaker. The film is a remake of Dynamite Ranch (1932),

== Cast ==
- Tom Tyler as Tom Morgan
- Lillian Gilmore as Helen Cleyburn
- Slim Whitaker as Jose Porfirio aka The Night Hawk
- William Gould as Frank Cleyburn
- John Elliott as Mr. Morgan, Tom's Father
- Earl Dwire as Pedro Gonzales
- Joe De La Cruz as Gasparo De Gama
- George Chesebro as Cleyburn Henchman Dick
- Lew Meehan as Cleyburn Henchman
- Richard Alexander as Night Hawk Henchman Pat
- George Hazel as Night Hawk Henchman Alonzo

== Bibliography ==
- Pitts, Michael R. Poverty Row Studios, 1929–1940: An Illustrated History of 55 Independent Film Companies, with a Filmography for Each. McFarland & Company, 2005.
