= The Feud (1919 film) =

1919 film

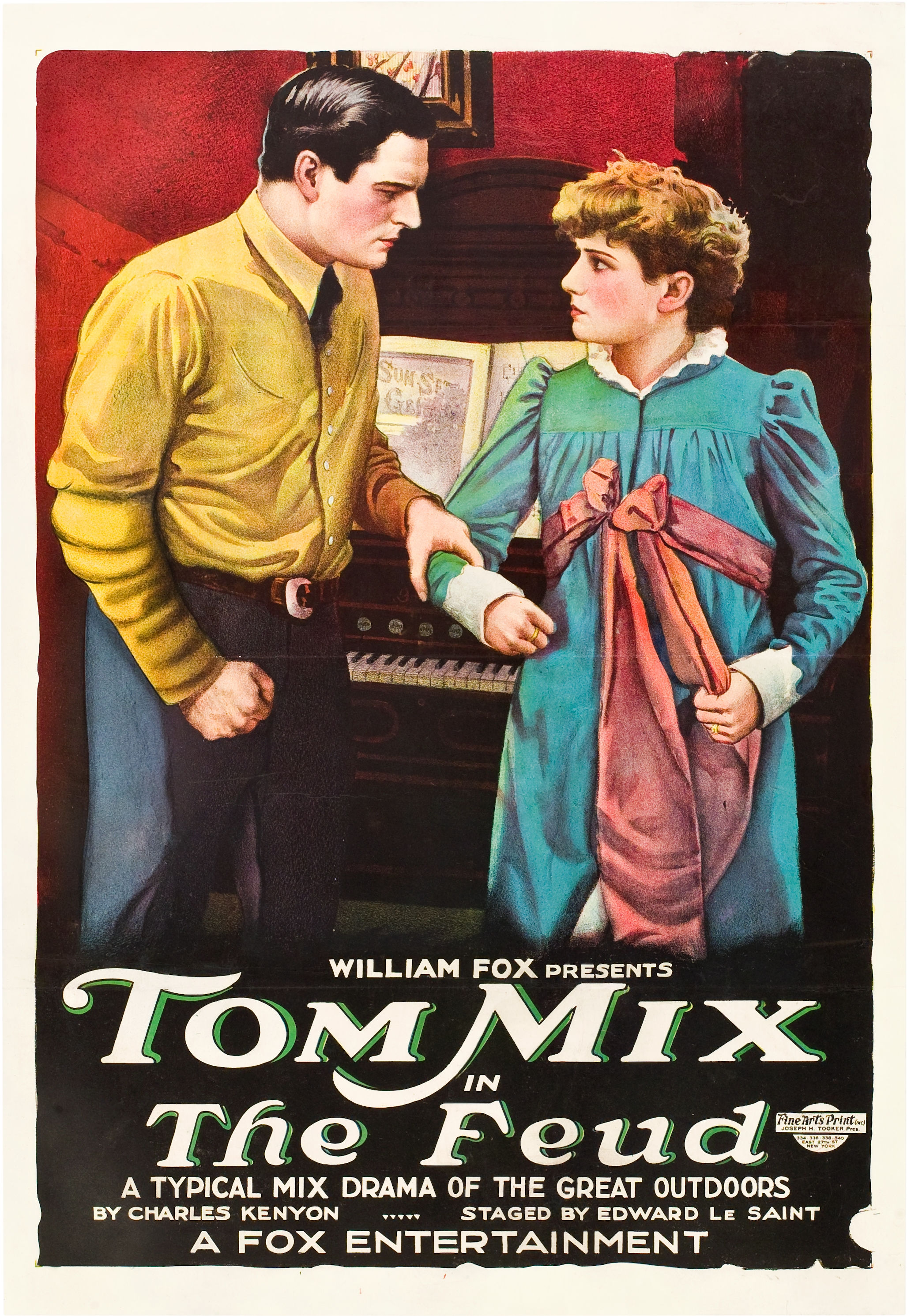
- Lobby poster
- Directed by: Edward LeSaint
- Written by: Charles Kenyon
- Produced by: William Fox
- Starring: Tom Mix; Eva Novak
- Cinematography: Dev Jennings (fr); John Leezer; Irving Rosenberg
- Distributed by: Fox Film Corporation
- Release date: December 7, 1919
- Running time: 5-6 reels
- Country: United States
- Language: Silent (English intertitles)

The Feud is a lost 1919 American silent drama film directed by Edward LeSaint and starring Tom Mix. It was produced and distributed by the Fox Film Corporation.

== Cast ==
- Tom Mix as Jere Lynch/John Smith
- Eva Novak as Betty Summers/Betty Brown
- Claire McDowell as Mary Lynch
- J. Arthur Mackley as William Lynch
- John Cossar as Horace Summers
- Mollie McConnell as Mrs. Summers
- Lloyd Bacon as Ben Summers
- Joseph Bennett as Cal Brown
- Jean Calhoun as Ray Saunders
- Frank Thorne as Bob Lynch
- Guy Eakins as Dan Lynch
- Sid Jordan as Bill Brady
- Nelson McDowell as McFadden
- Lucretia Harris as Nancy, The Negro Mammy

uncredited

- Buck Jones

== See also ==
- 1937 Fox vault fire
