= Gift of Gab (film) =

1934 film

- Directed by: Karl Freund
- Screenplay by: Rian James
- Adaptation by: Lou Breslow
- Story by: Philip G. Epstein; Jerry Wald
- Produced by: Rian James; Carl Laemmle Jr.
- Starring: Edmund Lowe; Gloria Stuart
- Cinematography: George Robinson; Harold Wenstrom
- Edited by: Ray Curtiss
- Distributed by: Universal Pictures
- Release date: September 1, 1934
- Running time: 70 minutes
- Country: United States
- Language: English

Gift of Gab is a 1934 black-and-white film released by Universal Pictures. Edmund Lowe stars as a man with the "Gift of Gab"—he can sell anyone anything. The film costars Ruth Etting, Ethel Waters, Victor Moore, and Gloria Stuart, and features Boris Karloff and Béla Lugosi. The film's sets were designed by the art director David Garber.

== Plot ==
A fast talking grifter and his stooge, after failing in selling a patented ink remover, inadvertently find themselves pushed into the radio broadcasting business. What follows is a series of blackouts behind the scenes of a radio studio.

== Cast ==
- Edmund Lowe – Phillip "Gift of Gab" Gabney
- Gloria Stuart – Barbara Kelton
- Ruth Etting – Ruth
- Phil Baker – absent-minded doctor
- Ethel Waters – Ethel
- Alice White – Margot
- Alexander Woollcott – cameo appearance
- Victor Moore – Colonel Trivers
- Hugh O'Connell – Patsy
- Helen Vinson – nurse
- Gene Austin – radio artist
- Thomas Hanlon – radio announcer
- Henry Armetta – janitor
- Sterling Holloway - Sound Effects Man
- Andy Devine – McDougal, the waiter
- Wini Shaw – cabaret singer
- Boris Karloff – cameo appearance
- Béla Lugosi – cameo appearance
- Roger Pryor as himself

== Production ==
Ruth Etting sings "Talking to Myself" and "Tomorrow, Who Cares?"

Originally the Three Stooges were signed to appear in the film, but they had just signed with Columbia Pictures for Woman Haters, the first of their short subjects, so three look-alike actors replaced them in Gift of Gab.

== See also ==
- List of American films of 1934
