= Outlawed (1921 film) =

1921 film

- Directed by: Alan James
- Written by: Alan James
- Starring: Carlyn Wagner; Bill Patton; Buck Connors
- Cinematography: George Barney
- Production company: Sylvanite Productions
- Distributed by: Pioneer Pictures
- Release date: May 1921 (US)
- Running time: 5 reels
- Country: United States
- Languages: Silent; English intertitles

Outlawed is a 1921 American silent Western film written and directed by Alan James. The film stars Carlyn Wagner, Bill Patton, and Buck Connors.

== Cast ==
- Carlyn Wagner as Barbara Benton
- Bill Patton as Bob Fleming
- Buck Connors as Bud Knowles
- Joe Rickson as Tom Benton
- Lee Pate as John Cortwright
- Pop Kennard as Howard Gordon
- Steve Clemento as Frank Kayner
- George Sowards as Dick May
- Edmund Burns as Sophy Robbin
