= Return of Grey Wolf =

1926 film

- Directed by: Jacques Rollens
- Written by: Jay Arr
- Produced by: William Steiner
- Starring: Leader, the Dog
- Cinematography: Angelo Giovannelli
- Edited by: Hugh B. Gunter
- Distributed by: Ambassador Pictures
- Release date: 1926
- Running time: 5 reels
- Country: United States
- Language: Silent film (English intertitles)

Return of Grey Wolf is a 1926 silent film action adventure produced by William Steiner and released by an independent company, Ambassador. It stars a dog named 'Leader' and can be found on DVD from Grapevine Video.

== Cast ==
- Leader the Dog - Grey Wolf (aka Long Tail)
- James Pierce - Louis LaRue
- Helen Lynch - Jean St. Claire
- Walter Shumway - Gaston Pacot
- Edward Coxen - Charles Hendrickson, Owner of Trading Post
- Lionel Belmore - Jacques St. Claire
- Whitehorse - Abe Hawkins
