= Six-Gun Rhythm =

1939 film

- Directed by: Sam Newfield
- Written by: Ted Richmond (original story); Fred Myton (screenplay)
- Produced by: Norman Haskall (associate producer); Sam Newfield (producer)
- Starring: See below
- Cinematography: Arthur Reed
- Edited by: Robert O. Crandall
- Music by: Johnny Lange; Lew Porter
- Distributed by: Grand National Pictures
- Release date: February 17, 1939
- Running time: 57 minutes
- Country: United States
- Language: English

Six-Gun Rhythm is a 1939 American Western film directed by Sam Newfield.

== Cast ==
- Tex Fletcher as Tex Fletcher
- Joan Barclay as Jean Harper
- Ralph Peters as Spud Donovan
- Reed Howes as Jim Davis
- Malcolm 'Bud' McTaggart as Don Harper
- Ted Adams as Sheriff Joe
- Walter Shumway as Henchman Bart
- Kit Guard as Henchman Pat
- Carl Mathews as Henchman Jake
- Art Davis as Henchman Mike
- Robert Frazer as Lem Baker
- Jack McHugh as Teammate Butch
- James Sheridan as Henchman Slim

== Soundtrack ==
- Tex Fletcher - "There's a Cabin in the Valley" (Written by Johnny Lange and Lew Porter)
- Tex Fletcher - "When I Get Back on the Range" (Written by Johnny Lange and Lew Porter)
- Tex Fletcher - "They Won't Stretch My Neck if I Know It" (Written by Johnny Lange and Lew Porter)
- "Serenade to a Lovely Senorita" (Johnny Lange and Lew Porter)
- Tex Fletcher - "Git Along Little Doggies" (Traditional)
- Tex Fletcher - "Lonesome Cowboy" (Written by Johnny Lange and Lew Porter)
