= Desert Dust =

1927 film

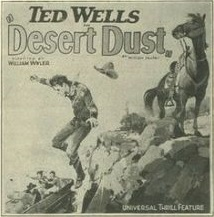
- Directed by: William Wyler
- Written by: William Berke; Gardner Bradford
- Produced by: Carl Laemmle
- Starring: Ted Wells; Lotus Thompson; Bruce Gordon
- Cinematography: Milton Bridenbecker
- Production company: Universal Pictures
- Distributed by: Universal Pictures
- Release date: December 18, 1927
- Running time: 50 minutes
- Country: United States
- Languages: Silent; English intertitles

Desert Dust is a 1927 American silent Western film directed by William Wyler and starring Ted Wells, Lotus Thompson and Bruce Gordon.

The film's sets were designed by the art director David S. Garber.

== Cast ==
- Ted Wells as Frank Fortune
- Lotus Thompson as Helen Marsden
- Bruce Gordon as 'Butch' Rorke
- Jimmy Phillips as The Rat
- Slim Cole as The Parson
- George Ovey as Shorty Benton
- Richard L'Estrange as Slim Donovan

== Preservation ==
With no holdings located in archives, Desert Dust is considered a lost film.
