= Gene Havlick =

American film editor

- Born: Eugene Charles Havlicek; March 16, 1894; Enid, Oklahoma, U.S.
- Died: May 11, 1959 (aged 65); Los Angeles, California, U.S.
- Occupation: Film editor
- Years active: 1928–1958

Gene Havlick (March 16, 1894 in Enid, Oklahoma, USA – May 11, 1959 in Los Angeles, California) was an American film editor.

He was nominated for three Academy Awards, winning one. He worked on over 100 films during his 30-year career.

== Early life ==
Eugene Charles Havlicek was born in Enid, Oklahoma to Frank Havlicek and Agnes Petricka, of Czech descent. His parents married in Heidelberg, Minnesota. Frank was a cabinet-maker, and later, an undertaker. By 1900, the family went by "Havlick".

== Filmography ==
- The Crimson Canyon (1928)
- Beauty and Bullets (1928)
- Grit Wins (1929)
- The Border Wildcat (1929)
- The Fall of Eve (1929)
- The Smiling Terror (1929)
- The Ridin' Demon (1929)
- The College Coquette (1929)
- Song of Love (1929)
- A Royal Romance (1930)
- Sisters (1930)
- Brothers (1930)
- Madonna of the Streets (1930)
- The Last Parade (1931)
- The Sky Raiders (1931)
- Lover Come Back (1931)
- Fifty Fathoms Deep (1931)
- A Dangerous Affair (1931)
- The Deceiver (1931)
- The Menace (1932)
- Shopworn (1932)
- Attorney for the Defense (1932)
- Hollywood Speaks (1932)
- War Correspondent (1932)
- The Last Man (1932)
- Vanity Street (1932)
- The Woman I Stole (1933)
- Lady for a Day (1933)
- Master of Men (1933)
- It Happened One Night (1934)
- Twentieth Century (1934)
- Blind Date (1934)
- Broadway Bill (1934)
- Eight Bells (1935)
- Unknown Woman (1935)
- She Couldn't Take It (1935)
- If You Could Only Cook (1935)
- Mr. Deeds Goes to Town (1936)
- Lost Horizon (1937)
- A Dangerous Adventure (1937)
- It's All Yours (1937)
- Start Cheering (1938)
- Extortion (1938)
- Law of the Plains (1938)
- You Can't Take It With You (1938)
- Blondie (1938)
- My Son Is a Criminal (1939)
- Blondie Meets the Boss (1939)
- Missing Daughters (1939)
- Mr. Smith Goes to Washington (1939)
- His Girl Friday (1940)
- Blondie on a Budget (1940)
- Blondie Has Servant Trouble (1940)
- Angels Over Broadway (1940)
- Blondie Goes Latin (1941)
- She Knew All the Answers (1941)
- Our Wife (1941)
- Go West, Young Lady (1941)
- Shut My Big Mouth (1942)
- The Wife Takes a Flyer (1942)
- Counter-Espionage (1942)
- The Desperadoes (1943)
- Destroyer (1943)
- Once Upon a Time (1944)
- Kansas City Kitty (1944)
- The Unwritten Code (1944)
- Youth on Trial (1945)
- A Thousand and One Nights (1945)
- Snafu (1945)
- The Gentleman Misbehaves (1946)
- The Walls Came Tumbling Down (1946)
- Sing While You Dance (1946)
- Dead Reckoning (1947)
- It Had to Be You (1947)
- Relentless (1948)
- The Return of October (1948)
- Shockproof (1949)
- Rusty Saves a Life (1949)
- Lust for Gold (1949)
- The Reckless Moment (1949)
- Fortunes of Captain Blood (1950)
- Rogues of Sherwood Forest (1950)
- Between Midnight and Dawn (1950)
- Santa Fe (1951)
- Dick Turpin's Ride (1951)
- The Son of Dr. Jekyll (1951)
- My Six Convicts (1952)
- Captain Pirate (1952)
- Hangman's Knot (1952)
- Voodoo Tiger (1952)
- Serpent of the Nile (1953)
- The Last Posse (1953)
- Valley of Head Hunters (1953)
- The Stranger Wore a Gun (1953)
- Killer Ape (1953)
- The Iron Glove (1954)
- The Saracen Blade (1954)
- Jungle Man-Eaters (1954)
- Three Hours to Kill (1954)
- Ten Wanted Men (1955)
- New Orleans Uncensored (1955)
- A Lawless Street (1955)
- Inside Detroit (1956)
- 7th Cavalry (1956)
- Domino Kid (1957)
- Screaming Mimi (1958)

== Academy Awards ==
All 3 are in the category of Best Film Editing.

- 10th Academy Awards-Nominated for Lost Horizon. Nomination shared with Gene Milford. Won.
- 11th Academy Awards-Nominated for You Can't Take It With You. Lost to The Adventures of Robin Hood.
- 12th Academy Awards-Nominated for Mr. Smith Goes to Washington, nomination shared with Al Clark. Lost to Gone with the Wind.
