= The Smiling Terror =

1929 film

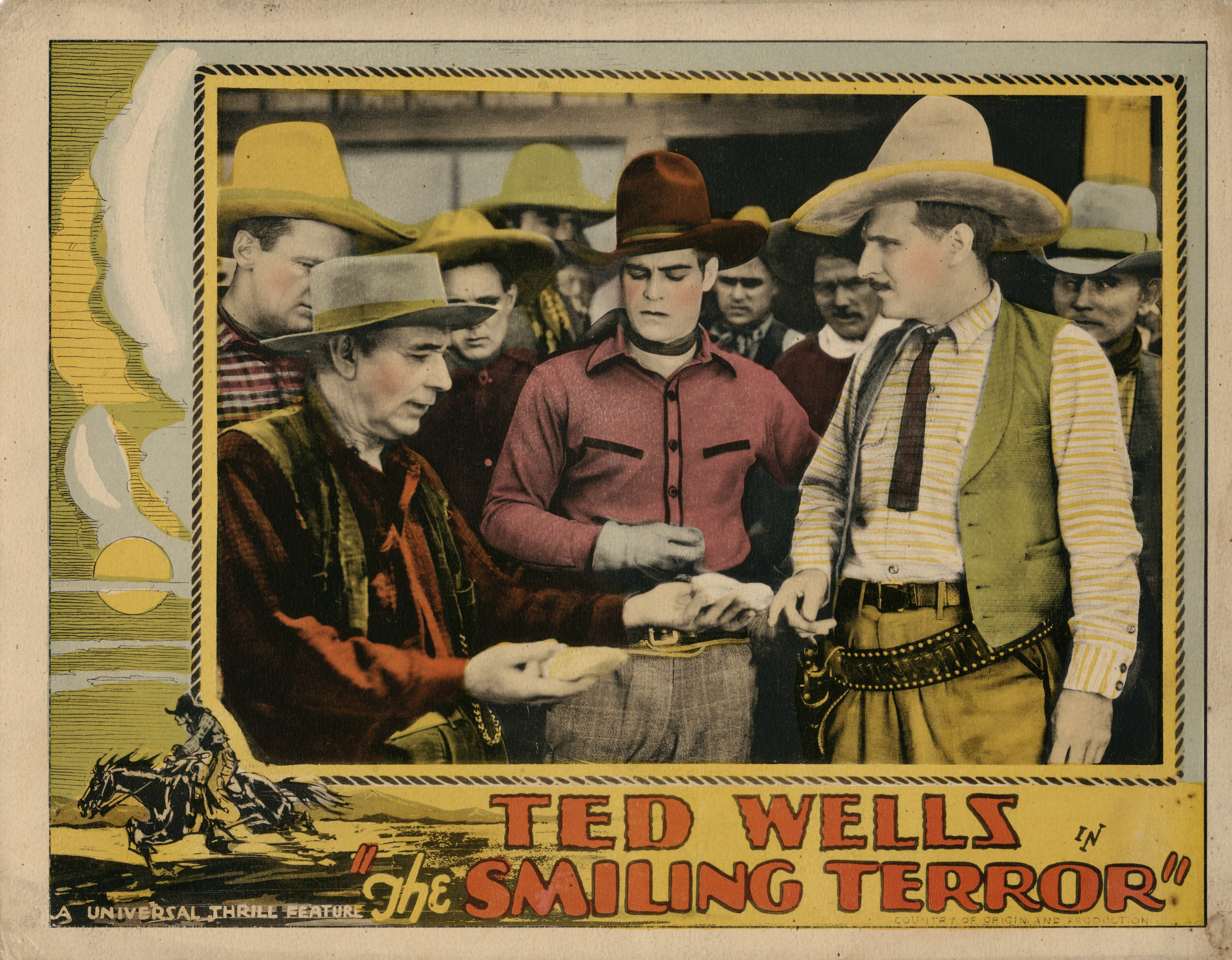
- Lobby card
- Directed by: Joseph Levigard
- Screenplay by: George H. Plympton; Carl Krusada
- Story by: William Berke
- Starring: Ted Wells; Derelys Perdue; Al Ferguson; Bud Osborne
- Cinematography: William S. Adams
- Edited by: Gene Havlick
- Production company: Universal Pictures
- Distributed by: Universal Pictures
- Release date: June 30, 1929
- Running time: 50 minutes
- Country: United States
- Languages: Silent; English intertitles

The Smiling Terror is a 1929 American silent Western film directed by Joseph Levigard and written by George H. Plympton and Carl Krusada. The film stars Ted Wells, Derelys Perdue, Al Ferguson and Bud Osborne. The film was released on June 30, 1929, by Universal Pictures.

== Cast ==
- Ted Wells as Ted Wayne
- Derelys Perdue as Mabel
- Al Ferguson as Hank Sims
- Bud Osborne as Ned

== Preservation ==
With no holdings located in archives, The Smiling Terror is considered a lost film.
