= Beauty and Bullets =

1928 film

- Directed by: Ray Taylor
- Screenplay by: George H. Plympton; Carl Krusada
- Story by: Carl Krusada; Vin Moore
- Starring: Ted Wells; Duane Thompson; Jack Kenny; Wilbur Mack
- Cinematography: Joseph Brotherton
- Edited by: Gene Havlick
- Production company: Universal Pictures
- Distributed by: Universal Pictures
- Release date: December 16, 1928
- Running time: 50 minutes
- Country: United States
- Languages: Silent; English intertitles

Beauty and Bullets is a 1928 American silent Western film directed by Ray Taylor and written by George H. Plympton and Carl Krusada. The film stars Ted Wells, Duane Thompson, Jack Kenny and Wilbur Mack. The film was released on December 16, 1928, by Universal Pictures.

== Plot ==
Joe Kemp and his gang attempt a robbery on the express company's payroll, only to be thwarted by Bill Allen. Bill recognizes one of the bandits as Frank Crawford, the brother of his sweetheart, Mary Crawford. After breaking up the robbery attempt, Bill attempts to take the payroll home with him for safekeeping, but Kemp's gang jumps him and makes off with the money. Bill eventually brings the gang to justice and asks to have Frank remanded into his custody.

== Cast ==
- Ted Wells as Bill Allen
- Duane Thompson as Mary Crawford
- Jack Kenny as Joe Kemp
- Wilbur Mack as Frank Crawford

== Production ==
The film was partially shot on location in Newhall, Santa Clarita, California.
