= Wolf Riders =

1935 film directed by Harry S. Webb

- Directed by: Harry S. Webb
- Written by: Carl Krusada; Rose Gordon; Lewie C. Borden
- Produced by: Bernard B. Ray; Harry S. Webb
- Starring: Jack Perrin; Lillian Gilmore; Lafe McKee
- Narrated by: Fred Bain
- Cinematography: J. Henry Kruse
- Edited by: William Austin
- Production company: Reliable Pictures
- Distributed by: Reliable Pictures
- Release date: February 2, 1935
- Running time: 56 minutes
- Country: United States
- Language: English

Wolf Riders is a 1935 American Western film directed by Harry S. Webb and starring Jack Perrin, Lillian Gilmore and Lafe McKee.

== Cast ==
- Jack Perrin as Jack Jennings
- Lillian Gilmore as Mary Clark
- Lafe McKee as John Clark - Indian Agent
- Nancy Deshon as Peggy Packard
- William Gould as Butch Weldon
- George Chesebro as Al Pierce
- Earl Dwire as Red Wolf

== Bibliography ==
- Pitts, Michael R. Poverty Row Studios, 1929–1940: An Illustrated History of 55 Independent Film Companies, with a Filmography for Each. McFarland & Company, 2005.
