= Tracked to Earth =

1922 film

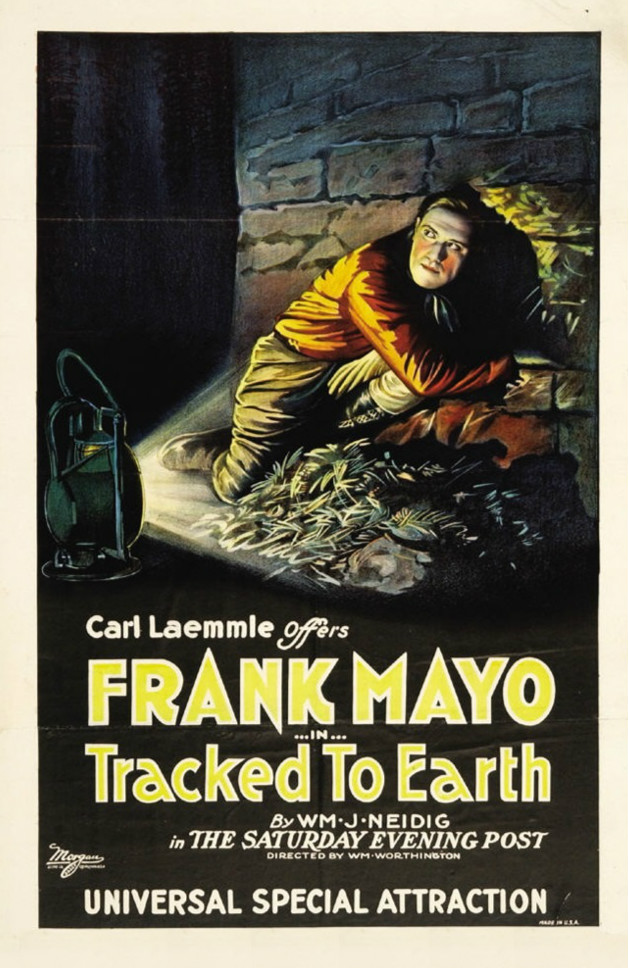
- Theatrical release poster
- Directed by: William Worthington
- Screenplay by: Wallace C. Clifton
- Based on: Tracked to Earth by William J. Neidig
- Starring: Frank Mayo; Virginia Valli; Harold Goodwin; Duke R. Lee; Buck Connors; Arthur Millett
- Cinematography: Leland Lancaster
- Production company: Universal Film Manufacturing Company
- Distributed by: Universal Film Manufacturing Company
- Release date: March 6, 1922
- Running time: 50 minutes
- Country: United States
- Languages: Silent; English intertitles

Tracked to Earth is a 1922 American silent Western film directed by William Worthington and written by Wallace C. Clifton. The film stars Frank Mayo, Virginia Valli, Harold Goodwin, Duke R. Lee, Buck Connors, and Arthur Millett. The film was released on March 6, 1922, by Universal Film Manufacturing Company.

== Cast ==
- Frank Mayo as Charles Cranner
- Virginia Valli as Anna Jones
- Harold Goodwin as Dick Jones
- Duke R. Lee as Stub Lou Tate
- Buck Connors as Shorty Fuller
- Arthur Millett as 'Big Bill' Angus
- Lon Poff as Meenie Wade
- Percy Challenger as Zed White
