= The Night Rider (film) =

1932 film

- Theatrical poster
- Directed by: Fred C. Newmeyer; William Nigh
- Written by: Harry L. Fraser (story and scenario)
- Produced by: George M. Merrick (associate producer); Alfred T. Mannon (associate producer) (uncredited); Louis Weiss (producer) (uncredited)
- Cinematography: James Diamond
- Edited by: Holbrook N. Todd
- Production company: Supreme Feature Films
- Distributed by: Weiss Brothers Artclass Pictures
- Release date: August 22, 1932
- Running time: 72 minutes
- Country: United States
- Language: English

The Night Rider is a 1932 American Pre-Code Western film directed by Fred C. Newmeyer and William Nigh.

== Cast ==
- Harry Carey as John Brown posing as Jim Blake
- Elinor Fair as Barbara Rogers
- George "Gabby" Hayes as Altoonie
- Julian Rivero as Manuel Alonzo Valdez
- J. Carlton Wetherby as Dan Rogers
- Nadja as Tula, a Saloon Dancer
- Tom London as Jeff Barton
- Walter Shumway as Sheriff Lynn Ricker
- Bob Kortman as Steve
- Cliff Lyons as Bert Logan
