= Greased Lightning (1928 film) =

1928 film

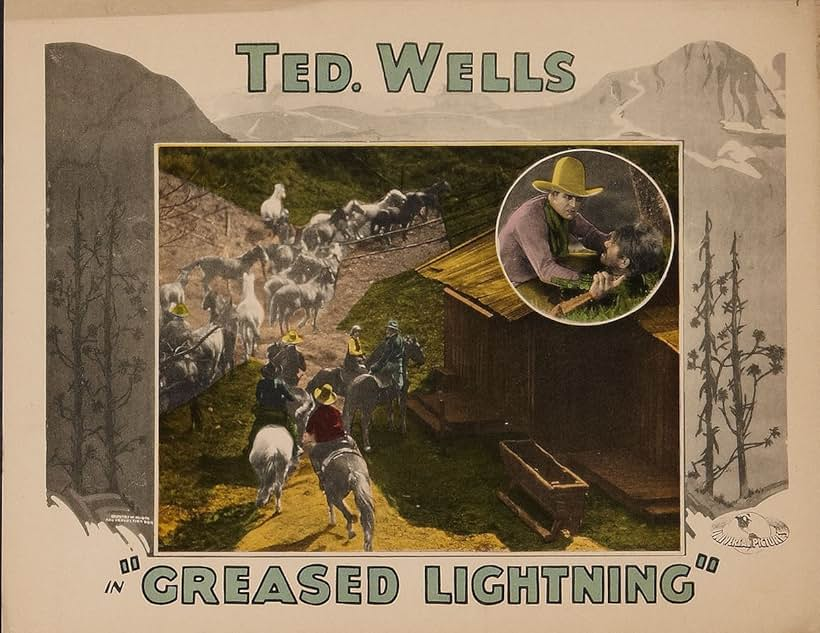
- Directed by: Ray Taylor
- Screenplay by: William Berke; Gardner Bradford
- Story by: William Berke
- Produced by: Carl Laemmle
- Starring: Ted Wells; Betty Caldwell; Walter Shumway; Lon Poff; George Dunning; Myrtis Crinley
- Cinematography: Milton Bridenbecker
- Edited by: Ben Pivar
- Production company: Universal Pictures
- Distributed by: Universal Pictures
- Release date: July 29, 1928
- Running time: 50 minutes
- Country: United States
- Languages: Silent; English intertitles

Greased Lightning is a 1928 American silent Western film directed by Ray Taylor and written by William Berke and Gardner Bradford. The film stars Ted Wells, Betty Caldwell, Walter Shumway, Lon Poff, George Dunning and Myrtis Crinley. The film was released on July 29, 1928, by Universal Pictures.

== Plot summary ==
Diana Standish inherits her grandfather's cattle ranch, but Dick Merrihew, as he wants the ranch for himself, will not leave her alone.

Diana is kidnapped by Dick, along with hero Johnny Parker's horse. Johnny sets out on his own to reclaim his livestock and rescue Diana. He defeats Dick and wins Diana's love.

== Cast ==
- Ted Wells as Johnny Parker
- Betty Caldwell as Diana Standish
- Walter Shumway as Dick Merrihew
- Lon Poff as Beauty Jones
- George Dunning as Mickey Murphy
- Myrtis Crinley as Annie Murphy
- Victor Allen as Jack Crane

== Reception ==
Photoplay gave the film a negative review, writing that it was "A DULL horse opera with the standardized formula."

== Preservation ==
With no holdings located in archives, Greased Lightning is considered a lost film.
