= The Intrusion of Isabel =

1919 film directed by Lloyd Ingraham

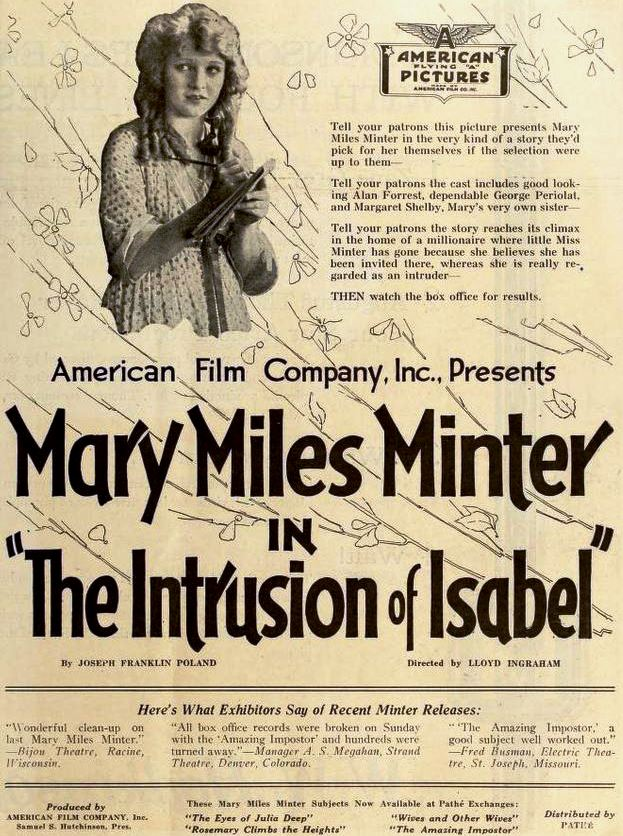
- Directed by: Lloyd Ingraham
- Written by: Joseph F. Poland
- Starring: Mary Miles Minter; J. Parks Jones; Allan Forrest; Lucretia Harris
- Production company: American Film Company
- Distributed by: Pathé Exchange
- Release date: April 13, 1919
- Running time: 5 reels
- Country: United States
- Language: Silent (English intertitles)

The Intrusion of Isabel is a 1919 American silent comedy film directed by Lloyd Ingraham and starring Mary Miles Minter, J. Parks Jones, Allan Forrest, and Lucretia Harris. As with many of Minter's features, it is thought to be a lost film.

== Plot ==
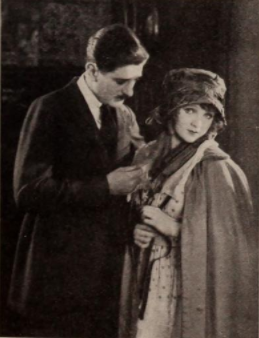
Mary Miles Minter and Allan Forrest in "The Intrusion of Isabel" (1919)

As described in various film magazine reviews, Isabel Trevor and her brother Bert, left penniless after the death of their father, sell their Southern home and move to New York, along with their servant Mammy Johnson. Bert finds work as a valet to Jack Craig, but as he does not want his sister to know that he is working as a servant, he tells Isabel that he and Craig are equal partners in a business.

One day, Bert steals a roll of money from Craig and flees to Montana without telling Isabel, leaving her with no way of paying her rent. Still under the impression that Bert and Craig are business partners, Isabel, along with Mammy, moves into "Bert's half" of Craig's house. Amused and enchanted by the girl, Craig permits her to stay. When Craig's sister Marian arrives for a visit, she is also taken with Isabel and seeks to arrange a marriage between the pair. Her plans are thwarted however, when a young woman named Lois Randall arrives with a marriage license, which she claims that Craig signed at a drunken supper.

Meanwhile, Bert has made good in outdoor work, and returns to New York, seeking his sister and also intending to return the money that he stole from Craig. At the same time he arrives at the Craig residence, it transpires that Lois is in fact a criminal known as "Matrimony Mary" who seeks to extort money from men by the use of fraudulent marriage licenses. With this situation cleared up, and the debt between the prospective brothers-in-law settled, Isabel and Craig are free to wed.

== Cast ==
- Mary Miles Minter as Isabel Trevor
- J. Parks Jones as Bert Trevor
- Lucretia Harris as Mammy Johnson
- Allan Forrest as Jack Craig
- Margaret Shelby as Lois Randall
- George Periolat as Henry Whitney
- Mary Land as Marian Whitney
- Carl Stockdale as James Harris

== Bibliography ==
- Donald W. McCaffrey & Christopher P. Jacobs. Guide to the Silent Years of American Cinema. Greenwood Publishing, 1999. ISBN 0-313-30345-2
