= Faith (1920 film) =

1920 film by Howard M. Mitchell

- Directed by: Howard M. Mitchell
- Written by: Joseph Anthony Roach (story)
- Screenplay by: Joseph Anthony Roach
- Starring: Peggy Hyland; J. Parks Jones; Guy Edward Hearn; Winter Hall
- Production company: Fox Film Corporation
- Distributed by: Fox Film Corporation
- Release date: February 1920
- Running time: 5 reels
- Country: United States
- Languages: Silent film (English intertitles)

Faith is a 1920 American silent romantic drama film directed by Howard M. Mitchell and starring Peggy Hyland, J. Parks Jones, Guy Edward Hearn, and Winter Hall. The film was released by Fox Film Corporation in February 1920.

== Cast ==
- Peggy Hyland as Peggy Laughlin
- J. Parks Jones as David Harden
- Guy Edward Hearn as Dr. George Kyle
- Winter Hall as Adam Harden
- Edwin B. Tilton as Sir Kent MacGregor
- Milla Davenport as Meg Harper
- Fred Herzog as Sandy Burns

== Preservation ==
It is unknown whether the film survives as no copies have been located, likely lost.
