= The Mojave Kid =

1927 film

- Directed by: Robert N. Bradbury
- Written by: Oliver Drake
- Produced by: Joseph P. Kennedy
- Starring: Bob Steele; Lillian Gilmore; Buck Connors
- Cinematography: E.M. MacManigal
- Production company: Robertson-Cole Pictures Corporation
- Distributed by: Film Booking Offices of America
- Release date: September 25, 1927
- Running time: 50 minutes
- Country: United States
- Languages: Silent; English intertitles

The Mojave Kid is a 1927 American silent Western film directed by Robert N. Bradbury and starring Bob Steele, Lillian Gilmore and Buck Connors.

The film had been considered lost by the Library of Congress, but as of 2021 it has been removed from the list.

== Cast ==
- Bob Steele as Bob Saunders
- Lillian Gilmore as Thelma Vaddez
- Buck Connors as Silent
- Bob Fleming as Big Olaf
- Jay Morley as Bull Dugan
- Theodore Henderson as Panamint Pete
- Nat Mills as Zeke Hatch

== Production ==
This was the first of a series of silent Westerns produced by Film Booking Offices of America (FBO) starring Bob Steele. Having been previously billed under the name Robert Bradbury Jr., this was his first picture under his new screen name. The film was directed by Steele's father, Robert North Bradbury.

Steele was injured during a fight scene, fracturing two vertebrae and cracking two ribs, and stayed at the French Hospital while healing.

== Bibliography ==
- Munden, Kenneth White (1997). The American Film Institute Catalog of Motion Pictures Produced in the United States, Part 1. University of California Press.
- Rainey, Buck (2004). The Strong, Silent Type: Over 100 Screen Cowboys, 1903-1930. McFarland. ISBN 978-0-7864-1286-0.
