= Wilbur Mack =

American actor (1873–1964)

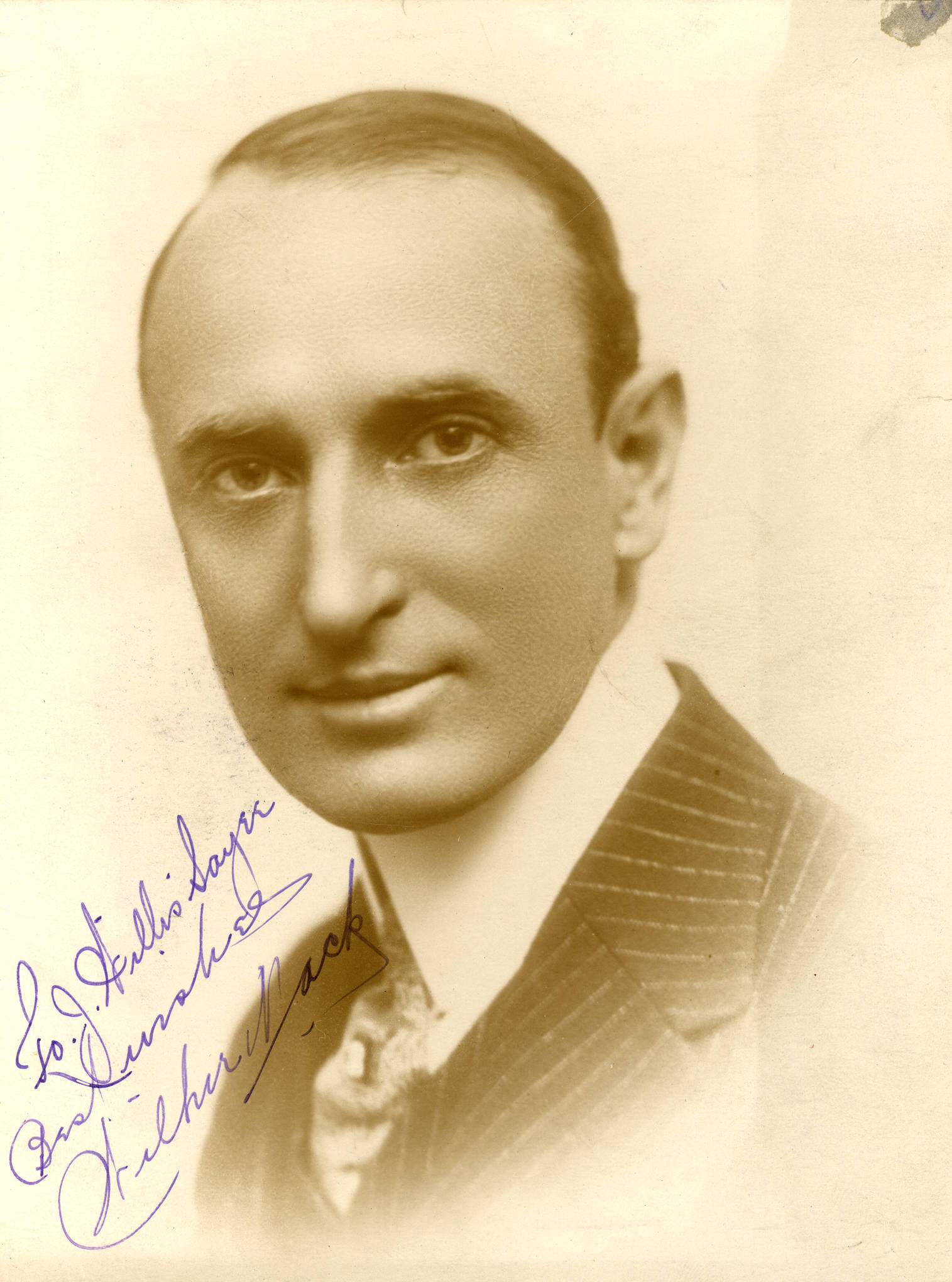
- Mack in 1914
- Born: George Frear Runyon; July 29, 1873; Binghamton, New York City, U.S.
- Died: March 13, 1964 (aged 90); Hollywood, California, U.S.
- Resting place: Forest Lawn Memorial Park, Hollywood Hills
- Occupation: Actor
- Years active: 1899–1962
- Spouse(s): Nella Walker (m. 1910; div. 19??); Gertrude Purdy

Wilbur Mack (born George Frear Runyon, July 29, 1873 – March 13, 1964) was an American film actor and early vaudeville performer from the 1920s through the 1960s. His film acting career began during the silent film era.

== Biography ==
Mack was born and raised in Binghamton, New York, and began acting professionally when he joined a repertory theatre when he was 16. He found success performing vaudeville with second wife Nella Walker ("Mack and Walker"). The couple divorced not far into the marriage and Walker subsequently found success as a supporting actress in the "talkies." Mack, meantime, found a new partner: Gertrude Purdy, with whom he reprised his popular husband and wife vaudeville routine (this time headlined "Mack and Purdy"). In addition to performing, Mack wrote dialogue for skits and words and music for songs in their vaudeville shows.

In 1925 Mack entered into a film acting career. His first film appearance was Gold and Grit. With wife Gertrude, he also wrote and performed in a Vitaphone romantic comedy pantomime An Everyday Occurrence (1928).

Mack made a smooth transition to talking films, but despite racking up an impressive number of appearances had less success finding lead or even featured roles. In 1930 he made thirteen films; from 1931 through 1933 he appeared in twenty-four; and from 1934 until 1939, he was cast fifty-five times. However, forty-five of those appearances were uncredited. His most notable credited role during that period was the 1936 crime drama The Crime Patrol, alongside Ray Walker.

Mack's career in subsequent decades was similar to his career up until that point, with moviegoers seeing him play mostly uncredited roles. Of the seventy-six film appearances he made from 1940 to 1949, only seven were credited. He would continue to appear in both films and television throughout the 1950s and into 1962, with his last being an uncredited part in the 1962 movie Who's Got the Action? starring Dean Martin, Lana Turner, Eddie Albert, and Walter Matthau.

Mack was living in Hollywood when he died on March 13, 1964. His remains are interred at Forest Lawn Memorial Park in Hollywood Hills.

== Selected filmography ==
- Gold and Grit (1925) - Jack Crawford
- The Hidden Way (1926) - Sid Atkins
- Straight Shootin' (1927) - 'Black' Brody
- Beauty and Bullets (1928)
- The Avenging Shadow (1928)
- The Body Punch (1929) - Peyson Turner
- Sweethearts on Parade (1930)
- Scarlet Pages (1930) - Mr. Henry Mason
- Paid (1930) - Mr. Irwin (uncredited)
- The Lawyer's Secret (1931) - Frank - District Attorney (uncredited)
- Annabelle's Affairs (1931) - Vance, assistant hotel manager
- Advice to the Lovelorn (1933) - Reporter
- Million Dollar Baby (1934)
- The Crime Patrol (1936) - Vic Santell
- That Gang of Mine (1940) - Nick Buffalo
- The Fatal Hour (1940) - Police Medical Examiner (uncredited)
- Detective Kitty O'Day (1944) - Coroner (uncredited)
- The Frozen Ghost (1945) - Man in Audience (uncredited)
- Stage Struck (1948) - Prof. Corella
- Ma and Pa Kettle (1949) - Diner on Train (uncredited)
- Scared Stiff (1953) - Ship Passenger
- Who's Got the Action? (1962) - Groom / Octogenarian (uncredited)
- The Manchurian Candidate (1962) - Delegate (uncredited)
