= Buck Connors =

American actor (1880–1947)

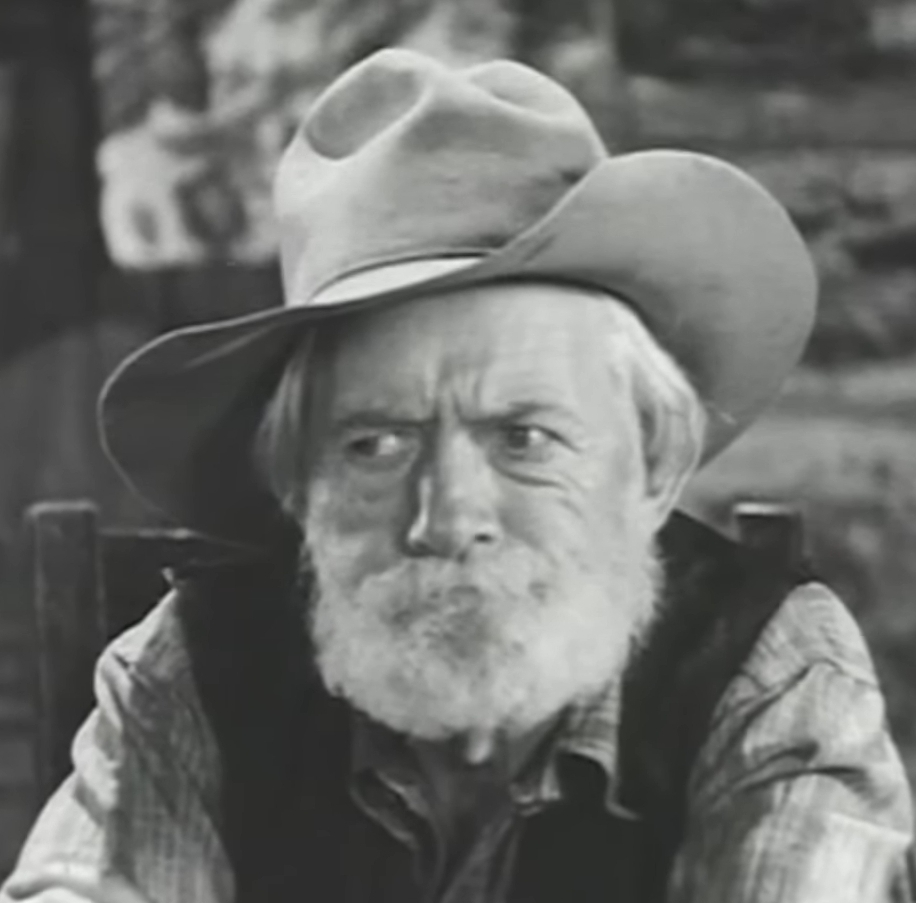
- Born: November 22, 1880; Streator, LaSalle County, Illinois, US
- Died: February 4, 1947 (aged 66); Quartzsite, Arizona, US
- Occupation: Actor
- Years active: 1912–1941

Buck Connors (November 22, 1880 – February 4, 1947) was an American actor. He appeared in more than 80 films between 1912 and 1941. He is the son of William L Conner and Leah Bowen. He was born in Streator, LaSalle County, Illinois, and died in Quartzsite, Arizona, and is buried in Hi Jolly Cemetery in Quartzsite.

== Selected filmography ==
- The Phantom Riders (1918)
- The Black Horse Bandit (1919)
- The $1,000,000 Reward (1920)
- Action (1921)
- Outlawed (1921)
- The Duke of Chimney Butte (1921)
- In the Days of Buffalo Bill (1922)
- Tracked to Earth (1922)
- The Social Buccaneer (1923)
- Fighting Fury (1924)
- The Back Trail (1924)
- Ridin' Thunder (1925)
- Hidden Loot (1925)
- The Radio Detective (1926)
- The Ridin' Rascal (1926)
- The Yellow Back (1926)
- The Fighting Three (1927)
- The Broncho Buster (1927)
- The Mojave Kid (1927)
- Straight Shootin' (1927)
- Jaws of Steel (1927)
- The Phantom Flyer (1928)
- The Fearless Rider (1928)
- Hell's Heroes (1930)
- The Lone Rider (1930)
- Headin' for Trouble (1931)
- Trails of Danger (1931)
- Desert Vengeance (1931)
- Between Fighting Men (1932)
- Alias John Law (1935)
- West of the Santa Fe (1938)
