= Charles R. Rogers filmography =

Charles R. Rogers, also known as Chas. R. Rogers, was an American film producer whose career lasted from 1924 through 1957. Through most of his career he operated as an independent film producer, although he did have stints at both RKO and Universal, including head of production at UA.

== Filmography ==
(as per AFI's database)

Year	Title	Role	Production Co.	Distribution Co.
1924	A Cafe in Cairo	Producer	Hunt Stromberg Productions	Producers Distributing Corp.
1924	The Legend of Hollywood	Producer	Charles R. Rogers Productions	Producers Distributing Corp.
1924	The Siren of Seville	Producer	Hunt Stromberg Productions	Producers Distributing Corp.
1925	The Crimson Runner	Producer	Hunt Stromberg Productions	Producers Distributing Corp.
1925	On the Threshold	Producer	Renaud Hoffman Productions	Producers Distributing Corp.
1926	The Frontier Trail	Producer	Charles R. Rogers Productions	Pathé Exchange
1926	Driftin' Thru	Producer	Charles R. Rogers Productions	Pathé Exchange
1926	Satan Town	Producer	Charles R. Rogers Productions	Pathé Exchange
1926	Señor Daredevil	Producer	Charles R. Rogers Productions	First National Pictures
1926	The Seventh Bandit	Producer	Charles R. Rogers Productions	Pathé Exchange
1926	The Unknown Cavalier	Producer	Charles R. Rogers Productions	First National Pictures
1926	The Unknown Soldier	Producer	Charles R. Rogers Productions	Producers Distributing Corp.
1927	The Devil's Saddle	Producer	Charles R. Rogers Productions	First National Pictures
1927	The Overland Stage	Producer	Charles R. Rogers Productions	First National Pictures
1927	The Red Raiders	Producer	Charles R. Rogers Productions	First National Pictures
1927	Gun Gospel	Producer	Charles R. Rogers Productions	First National Pictures
1927	The Land Beyond the Law	Producer	Charles R. Rogers Productions	First National Pictures
1927	Man Crazy	Producer	Charles R. Rogers Productions	First National Pictures
1927	Smile, Brother, Smile	Producer	Charles R. Rogers Productions	First National Pictures
1927	Somewhere in Sonora	Producer	Charles R. Rogers Productions	First National Pictures
1927	The Sunset Derby	Producer	First National Pictures	First National Pictures
1928	The Border Patrol	Producer	Charles R. Rogers Productions	Pathé Exchange
1928	Burning Bridges	Producer	Charles R. Rogers Productions	Pathé Exchange
1928	The Canyon of Adventure	Producer	Charles R. Rogers Productions	First National Pictures
1928	The Code of the Scarlet	Producer	Charles R. Rogers Productions	First National Pictures
1928	The Glorious Trail	Producer	Charles R. Rogers Productions	First National Pictures
1928	Ladies' Night in a Turkish Bath	Producer	Asher-Small-Rogers	First National Pictures
1928	Lady Be Good	Producer	First National Pictures	First National Pictures
1928	The Phantom City	Producer	Charles R. Rogers Productions	First National Pictures
1928	The Shepherd of the Hills	Producer	First National Pictures	First National Pictures
1928	The Upland Rider	Producer	First National Pictures	First National Pictures
1928	The Wagon Show	Producer	First National Pictures	First National Pictures
1929	The California Mail	Producer	First National Pictures	First National Pictures
1929	Cheyenne	Producer	First National Pictures	First National Pictures
1929	The Lawless Legion	Producer	First National Pictures	First National Pictures
1929	The Royal Rider	Producer	First National Pictures	First National Pictures
1931	Bad Company	Producer	RKO Pathé Pictures	RKO Pathé Pictures
1931	Devotion	Producer	RKO Pathé Pictures	RKO Pathé Pictures
1931	Millie	Producer	RKO Radio Pictures	Charles R. Rogers Productions
1931	Rebound	Producer	RKO Pathé Pictures	RKO Pathé Pictures
1931	Suicide Fleet	Producer	RKO Pathé Pictures	RKO Pathé Pictures
1931	Sweepstakes	Producer	RKO Pathé Pictures	RKO Pathé Pictures
1931	The Tip-Off	Producer	RKO Pathé Pictures	RKO Pathé Pictures
1931	A Woman of Experience	Producer	RKO Pathé Pictures	RKO Pathé Pictures
1932	70,000 Witnesses	Producer	Paramount Pictures	Charles R. Rogers Productions
1932	Carnival Boat	Producer	RKO Pathé Pictures	RKO Pathé Pictures
1932	Lady with a Past	Producer	RKO Pathé Pictures	RKO Pathé Pictures
1932	Madison Sq. Garden	Producer	Paramount Pictures	Charles R. Rogers Productions
1932	Panama Flo	Producer	RKO Pathé Pictures	RKO Radio Pictures
1932	Prestige	Producer	RKO Pathé Pictures	RKO Pathé Pictures
1933	The Billion Dollar Scandal	Producer	Paramount Pictures	Charles R. Rogers Productions
1933	Girl Without a Room	Producer	Paramount Pictures	Charles R. Rogers Productions
1934	Eight Girls in a Boat	Producer	Paramount Pictures	Charles R. Rogers Productions
1934	No More Women	Producer	Paramount Pictures	Charles R. Rogers Productions
1935	McFadden's Flats	Producer	Paramount Productions	Paramount Productions
1935	Hold 'Em Yale	Producer	Paramount Productions	Paramount Productions
1935	The Virginia Judge	Producer	Paramount Productions	Paramount Productions
1936	My Man Godfrey	Producer	Universal Productions	Universal Productions
1936	Two in a Crowd	Producer	Universal Productions	Universal Productions
1936	Three Smart Girls	Producer	Universal Productions	Universal Productions
1936	The Magnificent Brute	Producer	Universal Productions	Universal Productions
1936	The Girl on the Front Page	Producer	Universal Productions	Universal Productions
1936	Mysterious Crossing	Producer	Universal Productions	Universal Productions
1936	Flying Hostess	Producer	Universal Productions	Universal Productions
1936	Love Letters of a Star	Producer	Universal Productions	Universal Productions
1936	The Luckiest Girl in the World	Producer	Universal Productions	Universal Productions
1937	Top of the Town	Producer	Universal Productions	Universal Productions
1937	The Road Back	Producer	Universal Productions	Universal Productions
1937	One Hundred Men and a Girl	Producer	Universal Productions	Universal Productions
1937	Four Days' Wonder	Producer	Universal Productions	Universal Productions
1937	We Have Our Moments	Producer	Universal Productions	Universal Productions
1937	When Love Is Young	Producer	Universal Productions	Universal Productions
1937	Wings over Honolulu	Producer	Universal Productions	Universal Productions
1937	As Good As Married	Producer	Universal Productions	Universal Productions
1939	The Star Maker	Producer	Paramount Pictures	Paramount Pictures
1939	Our Neighbors – The Carters	Producer	Paramount Pictures	Paramount Pictures
1941	Adventure in Washington	Producer	Charles R. Rogers Productions	Columbia Pictures
1941	She Knew All the Answers	Producer	Charles R. Rogers Productions	Columbia Pictures
1943	The Powers Girl	Producer	Charles R. Rogers Productions	United Artists
1944	Song of the Open Road	Producer	Charles R. Rogers Productions	United Artists
1945	Delightfully Dangerous	Producer	Charles R. Rogers Productions	United Artists
1946	Angel on My Shoulder	Producer	Premier Productions	United Artists
1947	The Fabulous Dorseys	Producer	Embassy Productions	United Artists
