= James Bradbury =

Jim or James Bradbury may refer to:

- James W. Bradbury (1802–1901), United States Senator from Maine
- James Bradbury Sr. (1857–1940), American character actor in D. W. Griffith's Abraham Lincoln (1930 film)
- James Bradbury Jr. (1894–1936), American actor, son of above
- Jim Bradbury (1937–2023), British military historian

== See also ==
- James Bradberry (born 1993), American football cornerback for New York Giants
