= Joyce Arleen =

American actress (1931–2023)

- Born: Joyce Arleen Novotny; May 20, 1931; Hackensack, New Jersey, U.S.
- Died: February 17, 2023 (aged 91); Bakersfield, California, U.S.
- Other names: Arleen Joyce; Mary Thomas
- Occupation: Actress
- Years active: 1939–1942
- Known for: Child actress in Kings Row and The Gay Sisters

Joyce Arleen (born Joyce Arleen Novotny; May 20, 1931 – February 17, 2023), also credited as Arleen Joyce and Mary Thomas, was an American actress.

== Early life ==
Born in Hackensack, New Jersey on May 20, 1931, Arleen was a native of Garfield. Her parents were Joseph and Mary Novotny. Her sister was Dorothy Joyce, who would appear in The Blue Bird (1940) and Please Don't Eat the Daisies (1960).

== Career ==
In 1939, Arleen signed with Charles R. Rogers for a seven-year option for the Paramount film The Star Maker. That same year, Arleen, going by the name Mary Thomas, appeared in Our Neighbors – The Carters. A Variety review commented that her performance was "excellent throughout, especially capable in scenes in which she decides to be adopted by the rich city friends", and The Hollywood Reporter wrote that she was "superb".

Arleen appeared as Mary in the 1940 film The Great McGinty.

In 1942, Arleen portrayed the young Cassandra Tower in the Warner Bros. film Kings Row. A Variety review noted she gave the best performance of the film's child actors. Arleen also appeared as the main character during childhood in The Gay Sisters to a positive review by The Hollywood Reporter, and in Mrs. Wiggs of the Cabbage Patch.

== Personal life and death ==
Arleen married Alvin Baldock and they had one daughter.

On February 17, 2023, Arleen died in Bakersfield, California.

== Selected filmography ==
- The Star Maker (1939)
- Our Neighbors – The Carters (1939)
- The Great McGinty (1940)
- Kings Row (1942)
- The Gay Sisters (1942)
- Wake Island (1942)
- Mrs. Wiggs of the Cabbage Patch (1942)
