= Parade of the West =

1930 film

- Directed by: Harry Joe Brown
- Screenplay by: Bennett Cohen; Leslie Mason
- Story by: Bennett Cohen
- Produced by: Ken Maynard
- Starring: Ken Maynard; Gladys McConnell; Otis Harlan; Jack Hanlon; Frank Rice; Fred Burns
- Cinematography: Ted D. McCord
- Edited by: Fred Allen
- Production company: Ken Maynard Productions Inc.
- Distributed by: Universal Pictures
- Release date: January 19, 1930
- Running time: 66 minutes
- Country: United States
- Languages: Sound film (Part-Talkie); English Intertitles

Parade of the West is a 1930 American pre-Code Western part-talkie sound film directed by Harry Joe Brown and written by Bennett Cohen and Leslie Mason. While the film has a few talking sequences, the majority of the film featured a synchronized musical score with sound effects. The film stars Ken Maynard, Gladys McConnell, Otis Harlan, Jack Hanlon, Frank Rice and Fred Burns. The film was released on January 19, 1930, by Universal Pictures.

== Cast ==
- Ken Maynard as Bud Rand
- Gladys McConnell as Mary Owens
- Otis Harlan as Professor Clayton
- Jack Hanlon as Billy Rand
- Frank Rice as Snuffy
- Fred Burns as Copeland
- Bobby Dunn as Shorty
- Stanley Blystone as Dude
- Frank Yaconelli as Sicily Joe
- Blue Washington as Sambo
