= The Poor Nut =

1927 film

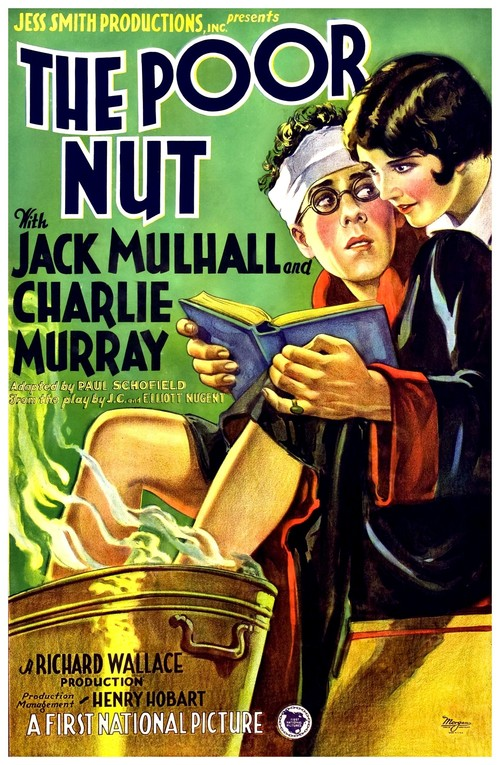
- Theatrical release poster
- Directed by: Richard Wallace
- Screenplay by: Paul Schofield
- Based on: The Poor Nut; 1925 play by: J. C. Nugent; Elliott Nugent
- Starring: Jack Mulhall; Charles Murray; Jean Arthur; Jane Winton; Glenn Tryon; Cornelius Keefe
- Cinematography: David Kesson
- Production company: Jess Smith Productions
- Distributed by: First National Pictures
- Release date: August 7, 1927
- Running time: 70 minutes
- Country: United States
- Language: Silent (English intertitles)

The Poor Nut is a 1927 American silent comedy film directed by Richard Wallace and written by Paul Schofield. It is based on the 1925 play The Poor Nut by J. C. Nugent and Elliott Nugent. The film stars Jack Mulhall, Charles Murray, Jean Arthur, Jane Winton, Glenn Tryon and Cornelius Keefe. The film was released on August 7, 1927, by First National Pictures.

== Preservation ==
Restored by UCLA Film & Television Archive with funding provided by The AFI/NEA Preservation Grants Program.

== Cast ==
- Jack Mulhall as John 'Jack' Miller
- Charles Murray as Doc Murphy
- Jean Arthur as Margie Blake
- Jane Winton as Julia Winters
- Glenn Tryon as Magpie Welch
- Cornelius Keefe as Wallie Pierce
- Maurice Ryan as Hub Smith
- Henry Vibart as Professor Demming
- Bruce Gordon as Coach Jackson
- William Courtright as Colonel Small
- Paul Kelly as Spike Hoyt
