= The Gay Sisters =

1942 film by Irving Rapper

- Theatrical release poster
- Directed by: Irving Rapper
- Screenplay by: Lenore J. Coffee
- Based on: The Gay Sisters; 1942 novel by Stephen Longstreet
- Produced by: Henry Blanke; Hal B. Wallis; (executive producer)
- Starring: Barbara Stanwyck; George Brent; Geraldine Fitzgerald; Donald Crisp; Gig Young; Nancy Coleman
- Cinematography: Sol Polito
- Edited by: Warren Low
- Music by: Max Steiner
- Distributed by: Warner Bros. Pictures
- Release date: August 1, 1942
- Running time: 110 minutes
- Country: United States
- Language: English
- Budget: $779,000
- Box office: $1.5 million (US rentals); $2,585,000 (worldwide)

The Gay Sisters is a 1942 American romantic drama film directed by Irving Rapper, and starring Barbara Stanwyck, George Brent, Geraldine Fitzgerald, Donald Crisp, Gig Young (who adopted his character's name as his screen name) and Nancy Coleman. The Warner Bros. motion picture was based on a 1942 novel of the same name by Stephen Longstreet.

== Plot ==
Immensely wealthy sisters Fiona, Evelyn, and Susie Gaylord, are orphaned as young children when first their mother goes down with the Lusitania and then their father, Major Penn Gaylord, is killed in France in World War I. Before Penn left for France, he told Fiona, the eldest, that the Gaylords never sell land they acquire.

However, their half billion dollar Gilded Age inheritance is held up in probate for decades, right up to 1941; Fiona complains that they have practically grown up in court. Though they have an opulent Fifth Avenue mansion, the sisters have had to borrow money to live very modestly. A French charity claims that Penn made a later will, leaving 10% of the Gaylord estate to it. Though the sisters are now willing to give up the 10% just to be done with the litigation and inherit what's left of the family trust, their real antagonist is maverick real estate developer Charles Barclay, who wants their mansion, and the choice land on which it sits, so that he can tear it down to erect his vanity project, Barclay Square. Fiona is determined not to give in.

Some years back middle sister Evelyn married an English nobleman, who is fighting in the RAF in World War II. Youngest sibling Susie is in love with nonconformist Modernist painter Gig Young, despite being married herself. Susie only stayed with her husband for a few hours, but he refuses to grant her an annulment, seeking to extort a fortune which she does not have. When the man-hungry Evelyn returns from England to join her sisters in a united front in court, she becomes immediately attracted to Gig and tries to steal him away.

In 1941, Fiona fires the longtime Gaylord lawyer, Hershell Gibbon, when he appears to be too sympathetic to Charles, and hires reserved Ralph Pedloch as his replacement. Through Gibbon's conniving it is revealed that Fiona and Charles have a prior history together. Six years earlier, an aunt died and left Fiona $100,000, to be disbursed upon her marriage. Fiona decided to go through with a sham union to a cousin in Vermont, but ran into the virile and charismatic Charles, then a road construction crew foreman, while en route, and found him both much more attractive and immediately available for her scheme. Within hours, she manipulated the lovestruck dupe into proposing. On their wedding night, she pretended to faint. While he went to fetch a restorative, she packed up, leaving a letter with $25,000, her wedding ring and an explanation of her sham. However, he returned before she could scram, and insists on consummating the marriage then and there. Fiona later gave birth to a boy, Austin, and had him raised by a trusted nurse.

When the nurse died, Fiona brought the then six-year-old to live with her, passing him off as a waif she has chosen to look after. Unexpectedly, she finds herself becoming very fond of the child, who warms to her in turn. She believes that Charles knows nothing of Austin, but he is tipped off by a frustrated Susie, who seeks to force Fiona to sell the family estate to him, which will give her the money to get her divorce and pitch a desperate effort to outflank Eveylyn. Charles puts detectives to work and establishes the child's parentage in court.

When Susie tries to commit suicide after it appears that she has lost Gig, Fiona finally realizes the toll her stubbornness is exacting on her family. She sells the mansion and its land to Charles, who still intends to build his monument to himself; in a Solomonic gesture she declares she does not wish to divide the child's loyalty in half and grants him sole custody of Austin. In the end, Gig loses his lust for the ruthless Evelyn, whom he insists return to England and live up to her noble responsibilities. He chooses to stay with the kind and caring Susie.

Charles tells Fiona that he still loves her. Fiona embraces and kisses him, the two finally united man and wife.

== Cast ==
- Barbara Stanwyck as Fiona Gaylord
- George Brent as Charles Barclay
- Geraldine Fitzgerald as Lady Evelyn Gaylord Burton
- Donald Crisp as Ralph Pedloch
- Byron E. Barr as Gig Young
- Nancy Coleman as Susanna "Susie" Gaylord Allen
- Gene Lockhart as Mr. Herschell Gibbon
- Larry Simms as Austin, aka "Butch"
- Donald Woods as Penn Sutherland Gaylord
- Grant Mitchell as Gilbert Wheeler
- William T. Orr as Dick Tone
- Anne Revere as Miss Ida Orner
- Helene Thimig as Saskia, the Gaylord maid
- George Lessey as Judge Barrows
- Charles Waldron as Mr. Van Rennseler (as Charles D. Waldron)
- Frank Reicher as Dr. Thomas Bigelow
- David Clyde as Benson, Penn's servant
- Mary Field as Farmer's Granddaughter / Organist
- Mary Thomas as Fiona Gaylord as a girl of eight

== Box office ==
According to Warner Bros. records, the film earned $1,728,000 domestically and $857,000 foreign.
