= The Man from Headquarters =

1928 film

- The full film
- Directed by: Duke Worne
- Written by: Arthur Hoerl; George Bronson Howard (novel)
- Produced by: Trem Carr
- Starring: Cornelius Keefe; Edith Roberts; Charles West
- Cinematography: Hap Depew
- Edited by: J.S. Harrington
- Production company: Trem Carr Pictures
- Distributed by: Rayart Pictures
- Release date: August 1928
- Running time: 60 minutes
- Country: United States
- Language: English intertitles

The Man from Headquarters is a 1928 American mystery film directed by Duke Worne and starring Cornelius Keefe, Edith Roberts and Charles West.

== Cast ==
- Cornelius Keefe as Yorke Norray
- Edith Roberts as Countess Jalna
- Charles West as No. 1
- Lloyd Whitlock as No. 2
- Ludwig Lowry as No. 3
- Wilbert Emile as No. 4
- Dave Harlow as No. 5
- Fred Hueston as Duke Albert
- Joseph P. Mack as Wilkinson

== Bibliography ==
- John T. Weaver. Twenty Years of Silents, 1908-1928. Scarecrow Press, 1971.
