= Cheyenne (1929 film) =

1929 film directed by Albert S. Rogell

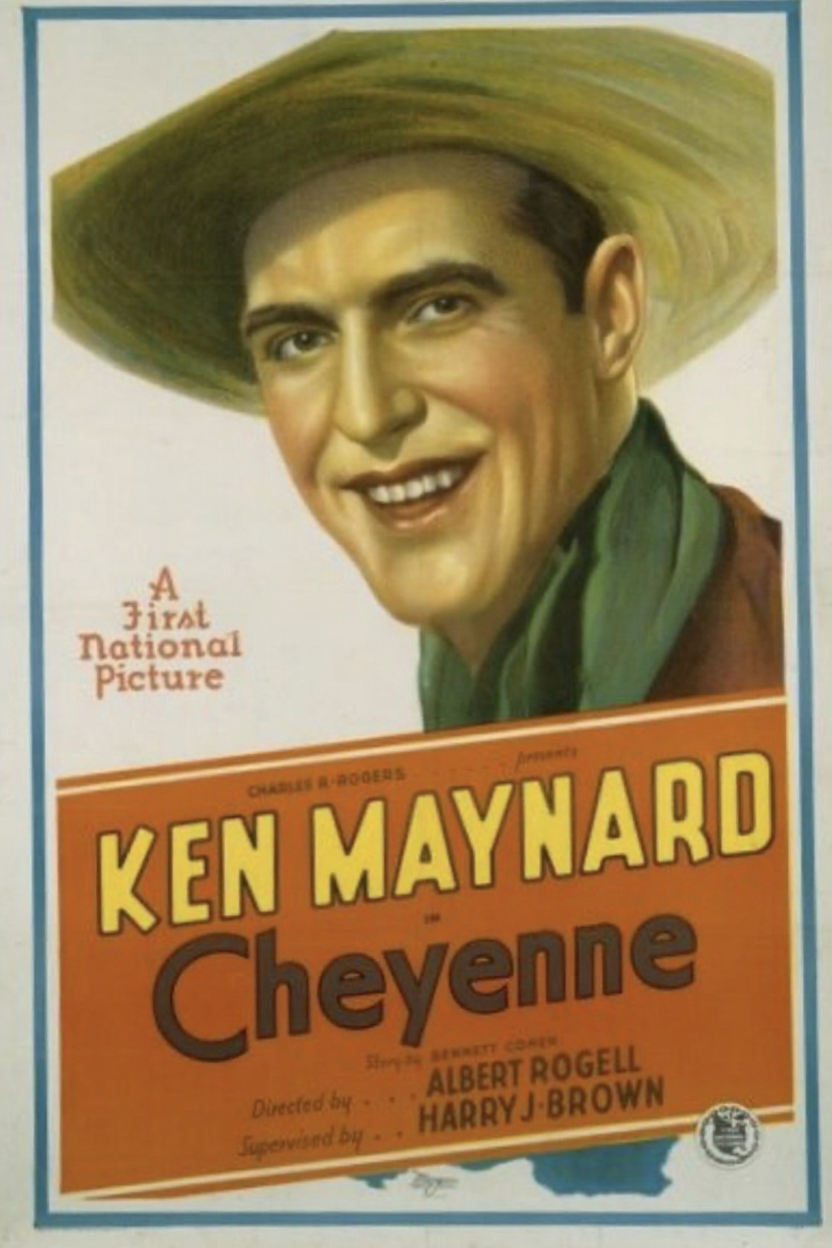
- Theatrical release poster
- Directed by: Albert S. Rogell
- Screenplay by: Bennett Cohen; Marion Jackson; Don Ryan
- Story by: Bennett Cohen
- Produced by: Charles R. Rogers
- Starring: Ken Maynard; Gladys McConnell; James Bradbury Jr. Billy Franey; Slim Whitaker
- Cinematography: Frank B. Good
- Edited by: Fred Allen
- Production company: First National Pictures
- Distributed by: Warner Bros. Pictures
- Release date: February 3, 1929
- Running time: 65 minutes
- Country: United States
- Languages: Sound (Synchronized); English intertitles

Cheyenne is a lost 1929 American Synchronized sound Western film directed by Albert S. Rogell and written by Bennett Cohen, Marion Jackson and Don Ryan. While the film has no audible dialog, it was released with a synchronized musical score with sound effects using the Vitaphone sound-on-disc sound process. The film stars Ken Maynard, Gladys McConnell, James Bradbury Jr., Billy Franey and Slim Whitaker. The film was released by Warner Bros. Pictures on February 3, 1929.

== Plot ==
After winning the Harper rodeo by a large margin, Cal Roberts dreams of heading to Cheyenne to compete for the state championship. He rides for Klaxton, but among his congratulators is Violet Wentworth, a courageous young woman who has been racing her father's horses to earn prize money to pay off a pressing debt. Cal promises Violet that he will ride for her at the upcoming Cheyenne rodeo.

Klaxton, overhearing this, schemes to prevent Cal from riding for a rival. He orders his stableman Dune to forge Cal's signature on a contract binding him to ride under Klaxton's colors at Cheyenne. Believing the contract is genuine, Cal thinks he is obligated to Klaxton.

Despite this, Cal and Violet remain close friends, with a promise of romance growing between them. Violet lacks the funds for the Cheyenne trip, and Klaxton refuses to pay Cal his prize money until after the rodeo, suspecting Cal will lend it to Violet. Determined to help, Cal and his friend Hap break into Klaxton's safe and take the prize money, which Cal passes to Violet through an intermediary.

Dune, remorseful over his forgery, warns Cal, but Klaxton's men kidnap Dune in a Ford car. Cal pursues on horseback (his trusty Tarzan), stopping every Ford he encounters in Cheyenne. The chase escalates into a riot involving police reserves. Mistaken for a wild outlaw, Cal is jailed.

Klaxton calls to admit the forgery, tears up the contract, and Cal is freed from obligations to both Klaxton and Violet.

Ahead of Cal's sentence is a man declared insane and sent to the psychopathic ward. Cal feigns insanity to be placed there, swaps places with the man, and seizes control of the ambulance. He drives straight to the rodeo grounds.

At the rodeo, Cal rides for Violet and wins the race, then escapes the pursuing police and leaps into Violet's coach during the next race, which he also wins. This victory secures Violet the prize money she desperately needs.

The police, trapped inside the coach, get an unexpected wild ride, while the judge who sentenced Cal watches from the stands and applauds his daring.

All misunderstandings are cleared up to everyone's satisfaction except Klaxton's, and Cal wins both the state rodeo championship and Violet's hand.

== Cast ==
- Ken Maynard as Cal Roberts
- Gladys McConnell as Violet Wentworth
- James Bradbury Jr. as Slim
- Billy Franey as Judge Boggs
- Slim Whitaker as Klaxton

== See also ==
- List of early sound feature films (1926–1929)
