= Classmates (1924 film) =

1924 film by John S. Robertson

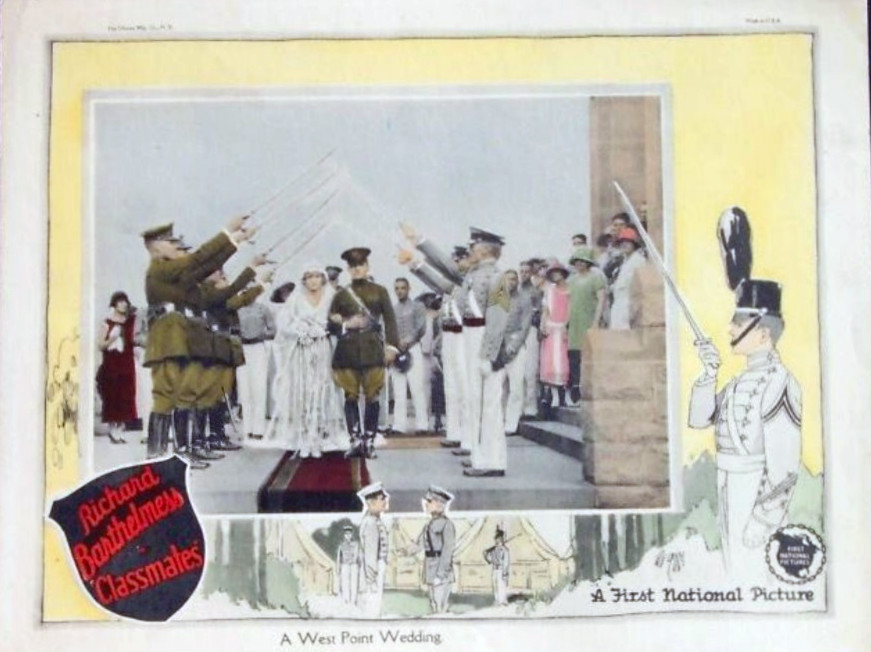
- Lobby card
- Directed by: John S. Robertson
- Written by: Josephine Lovett (scenario); H. E. R. Studios (intertitles)
- Based on: Classmates by William C. deMille and Margaret Turnbull
- Produced by: Inspiration Pictures
- Starring: Richard Barthelmess; Madge Evans
- Cinematography: Roy Overbaugh; John F. Seitz
- Edited by: William Hamilton
- Distributed by: Associated First National
- Release date: November 23, 1924
- Running time: 7 reels; 6,992 feet
- Country: United States
- Language: Silent (English intertitles)

Classmates is a 1924 American silent drama film starring Richard Barthelmess, produced by his company Inspiration Pictures, and distributed by Associated First National Pictures. The film was directed by John S. Robertson and starred Richard Barthelmess and a still teenaged Madge Evans. The film is based on a popular 1907 play by William C. deMille and Margaret Turnbull.

The play was previously filmed in 1908 and 1914.

== Plot ==
As described in a review in a film magazine, Duncan Irving, Jr. (Barthelmess), son of the village postmaster in a small Carolina town, is admitted to West Point. He is in love with Sylvia Randolph (Evans), whose family are wealthy snobs, and her cousin, Bert (Sheffield), openly insults Duncan. When Duncan is in the graduation class, Bert comes to West Point and resents being ordered about by the upper classmen, especially Duncan, who he considers his social inferior. Finally, he insults Duncan, who strikes him. Feigning blindness, he finally leaves the academy and goes on an expedition in the jungles of South America after giving Sylvia an erroneous account of the fight. Duncan, who has become an engineer, meets Sylvia, who refuses to listen to his explanation and tells him she is engaged to Bert. Word comes that Bert and his companion were lost in the jungle and probably died. To clear himself, Duncan and his pals go to try and rescue Bert. They meet all kinds of hardships, including the desertion of their guides, but are finally rescued by one of the chaps left behind with the supplies. In the meantime, they have found Bert, still unrepentant. All return to the States and when Bert tells the real truth, Duncan is reinstated and when he gets his commission he marries Sylvia at West Point.

== Cast ==
- Richard Barthelmess as Duncan Irving Jr
- Charlotte Walker as Mrs. Stafford
- Madge Evans as Sylvia, her niece
- Reginald Sheffield as Bert Stafford, her son
- Beach Cooke as Bubby Dumble
- Antrim Short as Jones
- Herbert Corthell as Drummer
- James Bradbury Jr as 'Silent' Clay
- Henry Balding Lewis as Major Lane
- Richard Harlan as A Halfbreed
- Claude Brooke as Duncan Irving Sr
- Chief Tony Tommy as Indian Guide
- Jack Oakie in a bit part (uncredited)

== Release ==
Classmates was released simultaneously in 125 cities across the United States in November 1924. This was notably different from most films at the time, which were released gradually from larger to smaller markets over the course of months. Classmates was a pace maker in the industry to move toward simultaneous distribution.

== Preservation ==
With no copies of Classmates located in any film archives, it is a lost film.
