= Linda Ware =

American actress

Linda Ware (born Beverly Jane Stillwagon, May 25, 1925 – September, 1975) was an American singer and actress who worked in radio, films, and concerts.

== Biography ==
Ware, born Beverly Jane Stillwagon on May 25, 1925, in Tarentum, Pennsylvania, was the daughter of George Stillwagon, but she spent several years in a Steubenville, Ohio, orphanage, following her mother's death. In time, her uncle and aunt took her into their home and provided music lessons for her. In 1938, they moved to Hollywood in hopes of finding an opportunity for her in the film industry.

When she was 12, she was offered a contract to appear in films. That offer led to a court case in which her aunt sought permission to control Ware's career, while her father objected to the proposal. Although Stillwagon denied having abandoned his daughter when she was 4 years old, the court ruled in the aunt's favor after Ware testified that her father "never so much as bought me an ice cream cone."

After those legal problems were resolved, Ware was designated to appear in the film The Star Maker.

In April 1939, Ware's father filed suit in Detroit asking for custody of his daughter. His suit claimed that he had neither known about nor consented to Ware's moving to Hollywood.

At age 15 Ware was a regular member of the cast of the radio program It Happened in Hollywood. An article in Radio Life magazine commented, "She teams effectively with John Conte on duets."

== Select filmography ==
- The Star Maker (1939)
- Paper Bullets (1941)
- Gangs, Inc (1941)
