= Smilin' Guns =

1929 film

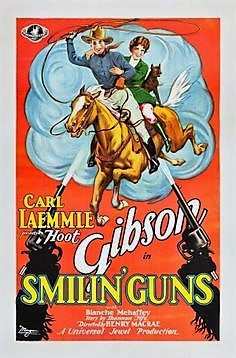
- Film poster
- Directed by: Henry MacRae
- Screenplay by: George Morgan
- Titles by: Harold Tarshis
- Based on: Smilin' Guns magazine story by Shannon Fife
- Produced by: Carl Laemmle Jr.
- Starring: Hoot Gibson
- Cinematography: Harry Neumann
- Edited by: Gilmore Walker
- Production company: Universal Pictures
- Distributed by: Universal Pictures
- Release date: March 31, 1929
- Running time: 60 minutes
- Country: United States
- Languages: Silent; English intertitles

Smilin' Guns is a 1929 American silent Western film, directed by Henry MacRae and starring Hoot Gibson.

== Plot ==
Cowboy Jack "Dirty Neck" Purvin travels to San Francisco to learn how to become a refined gentleman to impress Helen van Smythe. Upon his return from San Francisco, Purvin is forced to shed his training to save van Smythe from the grasp of a count, and her mother from a jewel thief.

== Cast ==
- Hoot Gibson as Jack Purvin
- Blanche Mehaffey as Helen van Smythe
- Virginia Pearson as Mrs. van Smythe
- Robert Graves as Durkin
- Leo White as Count Barett
- Walter Brennan as Ranch Foreman
- Jack Wise as Professor
- James Bradbury Jr. as Barber
- Dad Gibson as Stationmaster (credited as Walter "Dad" Gibson)

== Preservation status ==
- A print exists at the Library of Congress.
