= The Glorious Trail =

1928 film directed by Albert S. Rogell

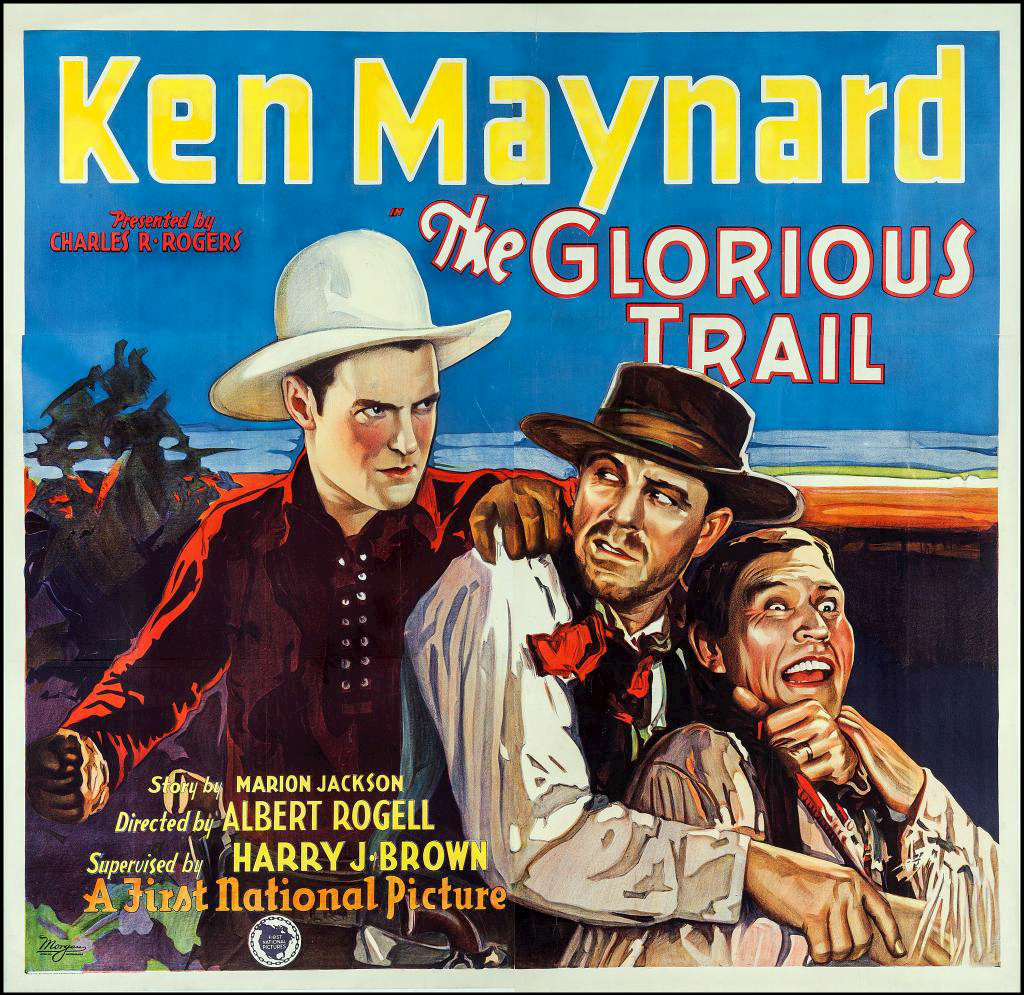
- Theatrical release poster
- Directed by: Albert S. Rogell
- Written by: Marion Jackson; Don Ryan
- Produced by: Harry Joe Brown; Charles R. Rogers
- Starring: Ken Maynard; Gladys McConnell; Frank Hagney
- Cinematography: Frank B. Good
- Edited by: Fred Allen
- Production company: Charles R. Rogers Productions
- Distributed by: First National Pictures
- Release date: October 28, 1928
- Running time: 65 minutes
- Country: United States
- Languages: Silent; English intertitles

The Glorious Trail is a 1928 American silent Western film directed by Albert S. Rogell and starring Ken Maynard, Gladys McConnell and Frank Hagney.

== Plot ==
As the frontiers of the American West push ever farther outward, a wire-laying crew works through hostile territory to connect the nation by telegraph.

A team of telegraph wire-layers is ambushed and killed by Indians. One worker, Jones, attempts to send a desperate warning to the nearest fort that a white man is behind the Indian aggression, but is mortally wounded before he can finish. The call is received by Pat O’Leary, a tough, resourceful scout and soldier stationed nearby who sets out to locate the man behind the attack.

Behind the violence is Gus Lynch, a ruthless frontiersman who manipulates High Wolf, the powerful Indian leader, to attack all men associated with the telegraph line. Lynch aims to halt the telegraph's progress and seize control of the territory for himself.

Lynch’s partner, Horse-Collar Keller, arrives with his niece Alice Harper; both are unaware of Lynch’s treachery. As their wagon nears the site of the massacre, Alice leaps down to comfort the dying Jones. With his final breath, Jones gives her a bundle of documents and a photograph of Pat O’Leary, urging her to find him and deliver them.

Back at the camp, Lynch reveals his plan to marry Alice. To escape this unwanted advance, Alice lies that she’s already engaged to O’Leary and presents Jones’s photograph as proof. Just then, Pat arrives, and Alice rushes to embrace him in front of Lynch to maintain the ruse, confusing O'Leary.

O’Leary secretly reinforces a telegraph supply wagon train by hiding armed men inside barrels in anticipation of an attack. Overhearing that Lynch and High Wolf plan an ambush, Alice stows away on the train to inform O'Leary. O’Leary alters the route but the convoy is still attacked in the open plains. Amid the chaos of battle, the wagon containing Alice breaks free, and her team of horses runs wild. O’Leary races on horseback and captures the runaway team, saving Alice. Lynch, enraged, pressures High Wolf into organizing a final, all-out assault on the telegraph camp.

That night, Alice gives O’Leary Jones's documents and reveals the truth about her false engagement. Pat proposes they make it a real one—and she happily agrees. The day the telegraph lines are completed, settlers and soldiers gather to hear the first message from the East. But just as the message comes through, the Indians begin their assault on the camp.

Outnumbered and low on ammunition, O’Leary performs a daring ride to a point farther down the line, where he taps into the wire and sends an urgent plea for help to a nearby fort. Reinforcements arrive just in time to save the camp.

Realizing he has been used and betrayed by Lynch, High Wolf kills him and ends the bloodshed. With the telegraph secured, Pat O’Leary rides into a new frontier.

== Cast ==
- Ken Maynard as Pat O'Leary
- Gladys McConnell as Alice Harper
- Frank Hagney as Gus Lynch
- James Bradbury Jr. as Bill Keller
- Billy Franey as Jimmy Bacon
- Chief Yowlachie as High Wolf
- Les Bates as Telegrapher

== Production ==
Exterior scenes for The Glorious Trail were shot on location at Cheyenne, Wyoming.
