= Gladys McConnell =

American actress and aviator (1905–1979)

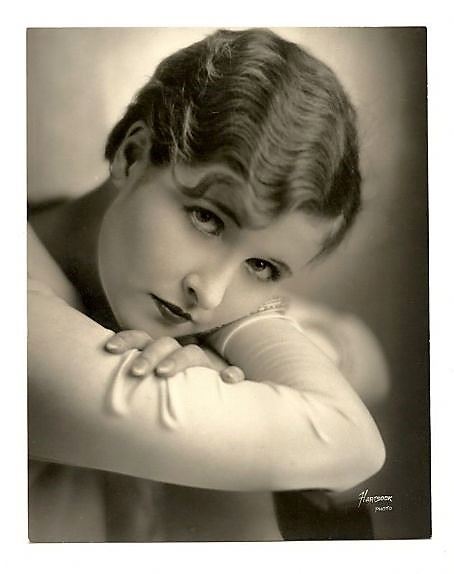
- McConnell, ca. 1926
- Born: October 22, 1905; Oklahoma City, Indian Territory (present-day Oklahoma), U.S.
- Died: March 4, 1979 (aged 73); Newbern, Tennessee, U.S.
- Other name: Gladys Morrow
- Occupation: Actress
- Years active: 1926–1930
- Spouses: Arthur Q. Hagerman (m. 1926; div. 1929) A. Ronald Button (m. 1931)
- Children: 1

Gladys McConnell (October 22, 1905 (Note: Some sources list her date of birth as October 22, 1906.) – March 4, 1979) was an American film actress and aviator.

== Early life ==
Gladys McConnell was born in Oklahoma City, Indian Territory (now Oklahoma) but spent much of her youth in Salt Lake City. She was the daughter of insurance executive William Marshall McConnell and his wife, Harriet (née Sharp), and she had an older sister named Hazel. McConnell attended Hollywood High School and Hollywood School for Girls in addition to schools in Spokane, Washington, and Hood River, Oregon.

McConnell's interest in acting emerged when she accompanied her sister on a visit to Universal Pictures, where Hazel was to have a screen test. Citing her skill with horses, McConnell went to the casting director's office to ask for an opportunity to appear in Westerns, and she eventually gained the kinds of roles that she sought.

== Actress ==
McConnell began acting in two-reel comedies and Westerns for Universal in 1924. Her film career lasted about four years from the late silent to early sound era. She sometimes used the professional name Gladys Morrow. One of her first parts came in The Devil Horse (1926). The film featured Rex the Wonder Horse, a stallion featured in at least 15 films. She starred with Harry Langdon in Three's A Crowd (1927) and in The Chaser (1928), as Langdon's talkative wife. She broke ties with the Fox Film Company over differences over her roles, choosing to freelance instead. She also made serials for Pathé Exchange.

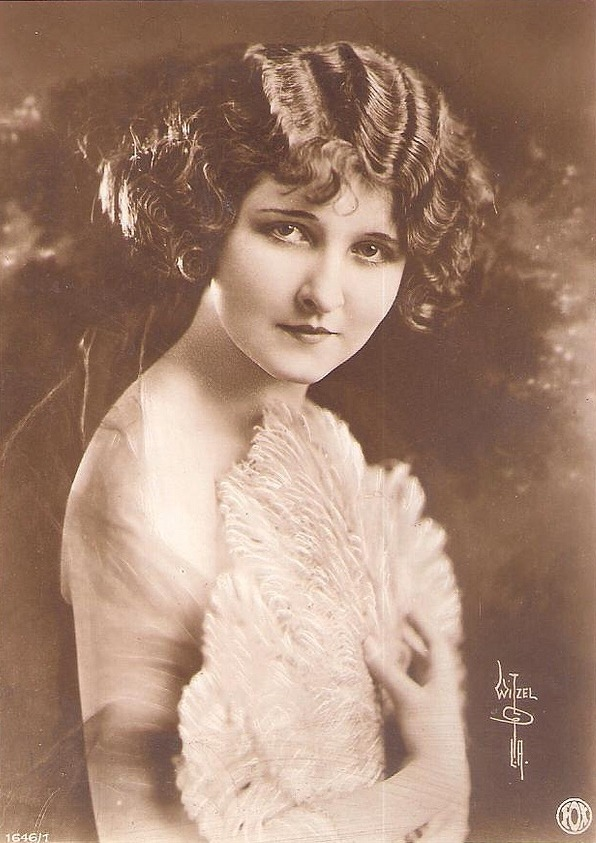
McConnell, c. 1927

She was a WAMPAS Baby Star of 1927. WAMPAS was a Hollywood promotional campaign that selected thirteen "baby stars" (slang at the time for starlets) as most likely to gain success. Others in the 1927 group included Iris Stuart, Natalie Kingston, Sally Phipps, and Rita Carewe.

In 1930, McConnell and actor Hugh Allan participated in legal action against film producer Eska Wilson. Their complaint alleged that Wilson had them go to Honolulu to work in a film but then abandoned them there. A complaint filed by the Los Angeles prosecutor accused Wilson of two counts of violation of California's labor laws. The actors also testified that Wilson failed to pay them four weeks' salary.

== Marriage ==
McConnell married Arthur Q. Hagerman in 1926; they divorced in August 1929. In September 1931, she married Hollywood attorney, A. Ronald Button, at the Mission Inn in Riverside, California. William Jennings Bryan Jr., a friend of the bridegroom, was best man at the wedding. McConnell was attended by her sister, Mrs. Harold O. Wright. They had a daughter, Mary Barbara Button.

== Aviator ==
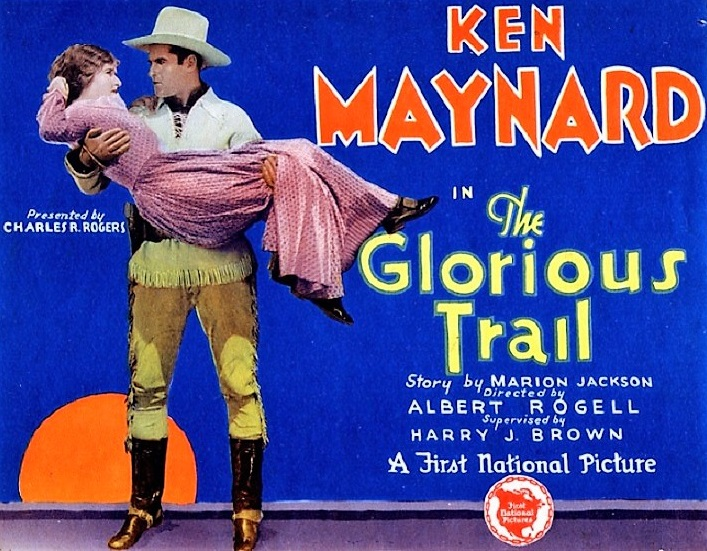
Gladys McConnell in The Glorious Trail (1928).

A 1920 US Federal Census shows her at about age 15 residing in Portland, Oregon with her mother, father, and older sister Hazel. About 1924, McConnell became an aviator who began flying in Portland. Aside from Ruth Elder, she logged more air hours than any woman in the film colony. She was once hostess on a Maddux Airlines passenger plane for an aerial breakfast party. McConnell also flew to various location settings to make films with actors like Harry Langdon and Ken Maynard.

== Death ==
Gladys McConnell died in Fullerton, California in 1979, aged 73.

== Partial filmography ==
- A Trip to Chinatown (1926)
- The Midnight Kiss (1926)
- The Devil Horse (1926)
- The Flying Horseman (1926)
- Marriage (1927)
- Riding to Fame (1927)
- Three's a Crowd (1927)
- The Tiger's Shadow (1928)
- The Perfect Crime (1928)
- The Bullet Mark (1928)
- The Chaser (1928)
- The Code of the Scarlet (1928)
- The Glorious Trail (1928)
- Cheyenne (1929)
- The Fire Detective (1929)
- Parade of the West (1930)

== Sources ==
- Los Angeles Times, New Baby Stars Stud Film Firmament, January 7, 1927, Page A1.
- Los Angeles Times, Three Crowd?, Not In Roomy New Roadster, September 11, 1927, Page G11.
- Los Angeles Times, Film Actress Marries Lawyer, September 4, 1931, Page 13.
- Lowell, Massachusetts The Sun, Go To Hollywood High School If You Would Be A Screen Star, March 3, 1927, Page 26.
- Modesto, California News-Herald, Film Actress, February 19, 1926, Page 2.
- Syracuse Herald, Gladys McConnell Granted Divorce, August 8, 1929, Page 10.
- Woodland, California Daily Democrat, Hollywood Close Ups, October 5, 1928, Page 11.
