= The Tiger's Shadow =

1928 film

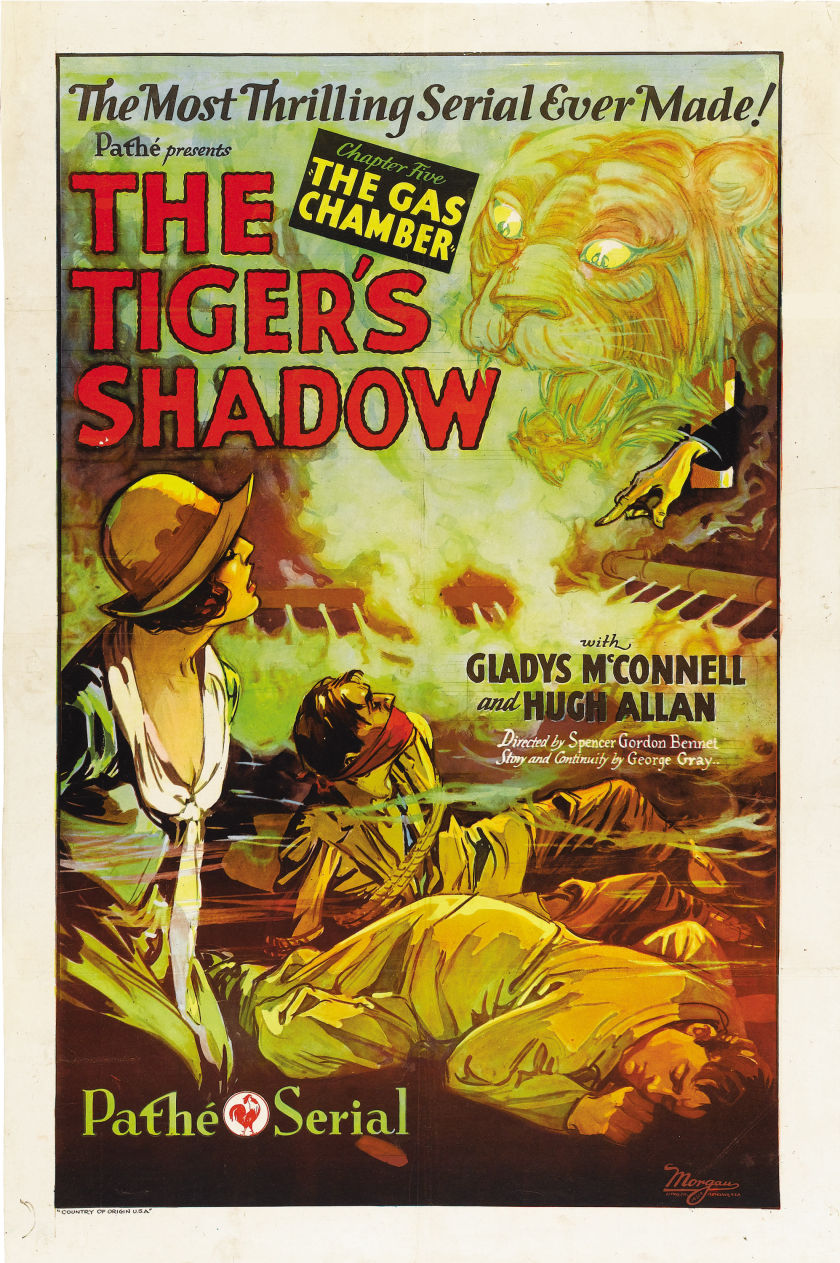
- Film poster
- Directed by: Spencer Gordon Bennet
- Written by: George Arthur Gray
- Starring: Gladys McConnell; Hugh Allan
- Distributed by: Pathé Exchange
- Release date: December 23, 1928
- Running time: 10 episodes
- Country: United States
- Languages: Silent; English intertitles

The Tiger's Shadow is a 1928 American drama film serial directed by Spencer Gordon Bennet.

== Cast ==
- Gladys McConnell as Jane Barstow
- Hugh Allan as Larry Trent
- Frank Lackteen as Dr. Sandro
- Edward Cecil as Slayton
- Harry Semels as Hawks
- Broderick O'Farrell as Amos Crain
- Henry Hebert as Andre Blane
- Paul Weigel as Martin Meeker
- F.F. Guenste as Briggs, the Butler
- John Webb Dillion as Ladd, the Gardener
- Floyd Ames as Marks
- Bruce Gordon as Bennie
- Jean Porter as Flora
- Richard Cramer as RoughHouse Rowan
- George Kern as Boss Collins
- Blackie Whiteford as McCord

== See also ==
- List of film serials
- List of film serials by studio
