= Three's a Crowd (1927 film) =

1927 film

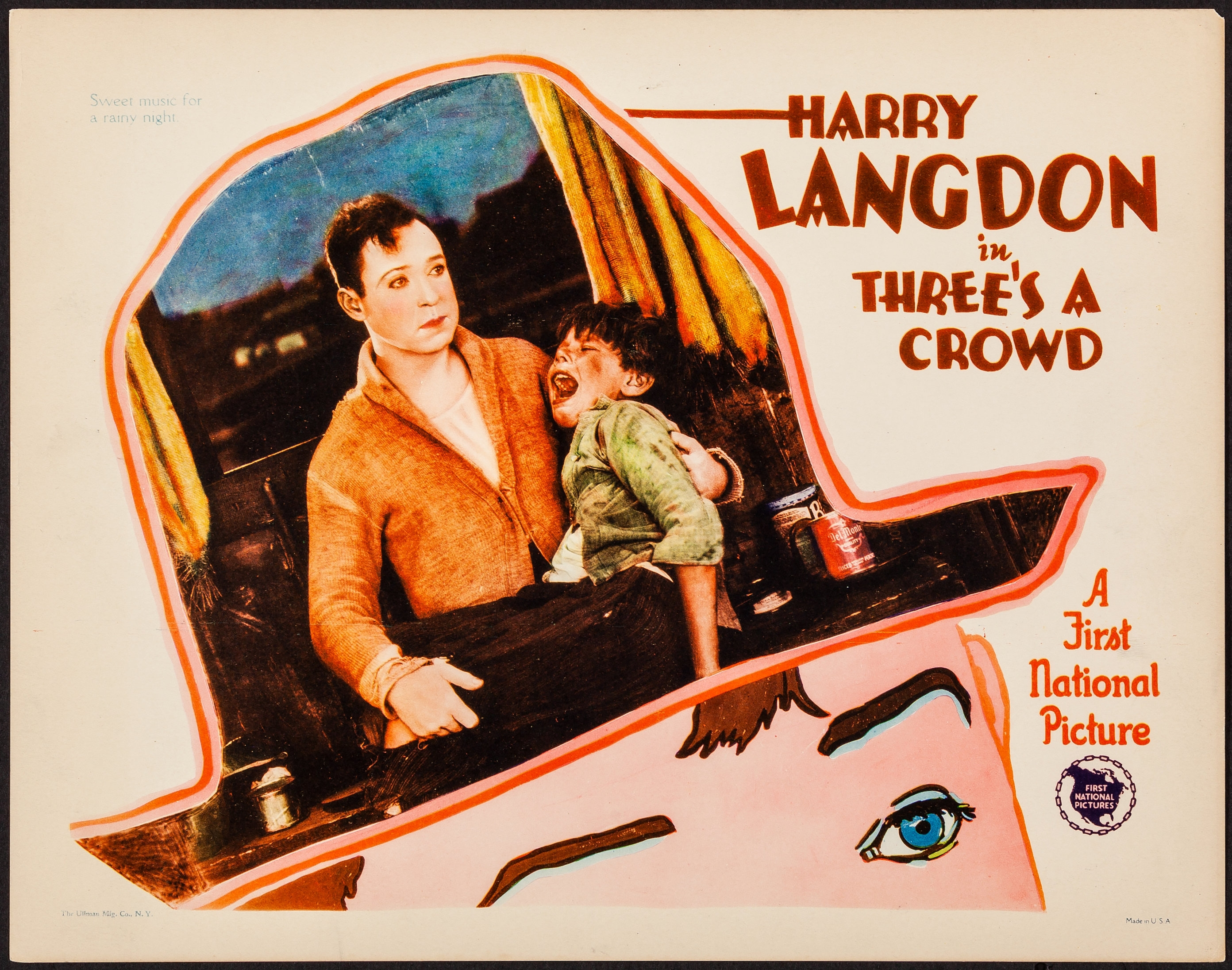
- Lobby card for the film
- Directed by: Harry Langdon
- Screenplay by: James Langdon; Robert Eddy
- Story by: Arthur Ripley
- Starring: Harry Langdon; Gladys McConnell; Cornelius Keefe; Arthur Thalasso
- Cinematography: Elgin Lessley; Frank Evans
- Edited by: Alfred DeGaetano
- Production company: Harry Langdon Corporation
- Distributed by: First National Pictures
- Release date: August 28, 1927
- Running time: 60 minutes
- Country: United States
- Language: Silent (English intertitles)

Three's a Crowd is a 1927 American silent comedy film directed by Harry Langdon and written by James Langdon and Robert Eddy. The film stars Harry Langdon, Gladys McConnell, Cornelius Keefe, and Arthur Thalasso. The film was released on August 28, 1927, by First National Pictures.

== Plot ==
The film.

Harry, a mover's boy, watches his boss play proudly with his son, then retrieves a rag doll from the garbage.

Gladys, exasperated by her husband's intemperance, leaves him. Harry finds her slumped on the snowy ground and comes to her aid by hosting her in his modest attic. Then he realizes that the woman is about to give birth to a child, and immediately summons an army of midwives and doctors, who, after the birth, congratulate him, believing him to be the father.

Harry sees his desire for family magically fulfilled, and busily takes care of the woman and the child. A palmist assures him that the child's father will never come looking for his wife and baby.

The father, now repentant, instead, goes to look for them and finds them, looking out, on a stormy night, at the window of the attic. Gladys, however, has grown fond of Harry, and, in the boxing match organized between the two men, she encourages and supports him, because she wants to stay with him, together with the child.

But this is only Harry's dream. In reality, the husband and wife make peace, and, deeply grateful to Harry, greet him with a handshake (the palm of which Harry then looks at dejectedly) and leave with their son.

That same night, when the elements have subsided, Harry leaves the house, and - after seeing the lost rag doll abandoned along the street - goes to the fortune teller's window brandishing a brick. Then he renounces the useless revenge, and drops the brick.But the discarded brick releases a gigantic telephone cable drum that destroys the fortune teller's shop.

== Cast ==
- Harry Langdon as Harry
- Gladys McConnell as Gladys
- Cornelius Keefe as The Husband
- Arthur Thalasso as Harry's Boss
- George Dunning as The Boss's Little Boy

== Production ==
Originally Frank Capra, who had directed Langdon's previous feature Long Pants, was set to direct the film, but was fired by Langdon. Capra's animosity toward Langdon resulted in him sending film exhibitors a letter criticizing Langdon as "a temperamental egoist". Following Capra's firing, Langdon took over as the director. This would be his first directorial effort, and the first film of his three picture deal with First National Pictures. Sets for the film included "one indoor set and a couple phony exterior sets". More film was shot than was ultimately used including scenes depicting "Gladys's life before meeting Harry" as well as a different ending that destroyed the fortune-teller's place. After test audiences reacted poorly, Langdon shot the ending that the film uses. Ultimately the film would be a box office failure.
