= Satan and the Woman =

1928 film directed by Burton L. King

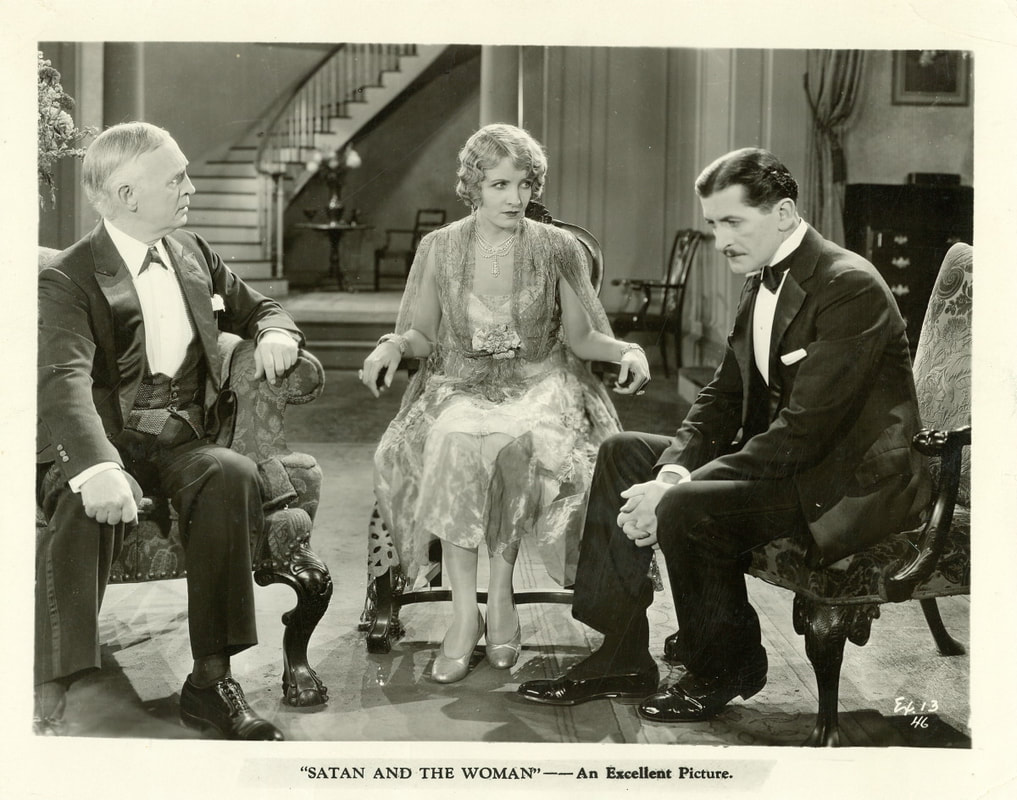
- Directed by: Burton L. King
- Written by: Mary Lanier Magruder (story); Harry Chandlee; Adrian Johnson
- Produced by: Harry Chandlee; Samuel Zierler
- Starring: Claire Windsor; Cornelius Keefe; Vera Lewis
- Cinematography: Arthur Reeves
- Production company: Excellent Pictures
- Distributed by: Excellent Pictures
- Release date: January 20, 1928
- Running time: 64 minutes
- Country: United States
- Languages: Silent; English intertitles

Satan and the Woman is a 1928 American silent drama film directed by Burton L. King and starring Claire Windsor, Cornelius Keefe and Vera Lewis. The film was adapted for the screen by Adrian Johnson and Harry Chandlee based on a short story titled "Courage" by Mary Lanier Magruder, which originally appeared in Young's Magazine.

== Cast ==
- Claire Windsor as Judith Matheny
- Cornelius Keefe as Edward Daingerfield
- Vera Lewis as Mrs. Leone Daingerfield
- Thomas Holding as Ellison Colby
- James T. Mack as Dallam Colby
- Edith Murgatroyd as Hetty Folinsbee
- Madge Johnston as Clementine Atwood
- Sybil Grove as One of The Three Graces
- Lucy Donahue as One of The Three Graces
- Blanche Rose as One of The Three Graces

== Preservation ==
Satan and the Woman is currently presumed lost. In February of 2021, the film was cited by the National Film Preservation Board on their Lost U.S. Silent Feature Films list.

== Bibliography ==
- Munden, Kenneth White. The American Film Institute Catalog of Motion Pictures Produced in the United States, Part 1. University of California Press, 1997.
