= Thundergod (film) =

1928 film

- Directed by: Charles J. Hunt
- Written by: James Oliver Curwood (story); Arthur Hoerl
- Produced by: Morris R. Schlank
- Starring: Cornelius Keefe; Lila Lee; Walter Long
- Cinematography: Robert E. Cline
- Edited by: William Holmes
- Production company: Morris R. Schlank Productions
- Distributed by: Anchor Film Distributors
- Release date: June 15, 1928
- Running time: 50 minutes
- Country: United States
- Languages: Silent; English intertitles

Thundergod is a 1928 American silent drama film directed by Charles J. Hunt and starring Cornelius Keefe, Lila Lee and Walter Long. An independent production, it is based on a short story by James Oliver Curwood.

== Plot ==
After his girlfriend leaves him, a city man goes to work in a lumber camp owned by a woman whose rivals are trying to put her out of business.

== Cast ==
- Cornelius Keefe as Roland Hale
- Lila Lee as Enid Bryant
- Walter Long as Bruce Drossler
- Helen Lynch as Alyce
- Ray Hallor as Ollie Sanderson
- Jules Cowles as Clinky

== Bibliography ==
- Munden, Kenneth White. The American Film Institute Catalog of Motion Pictures Produced in the United States, Part 1. University of California Press, 1997.
