= Cornelius Keefe =

American actor

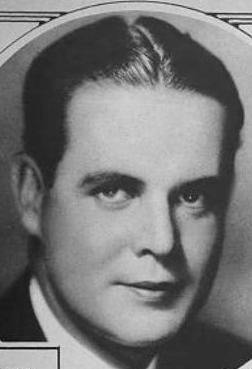
- Born: July 13, 1900; Boston, Massachusetts; United States
- Died: December 11, 1972 (aged 72)
- Occupation: Actor
- Years active: 1924–1958 (film & TV)

Cornelius Keefe (July 13, 1900 – December 11, 1972) was an American film actor.

Keefe was born in Boston. He attended Brookline High School and Newton High School.

== Career ==
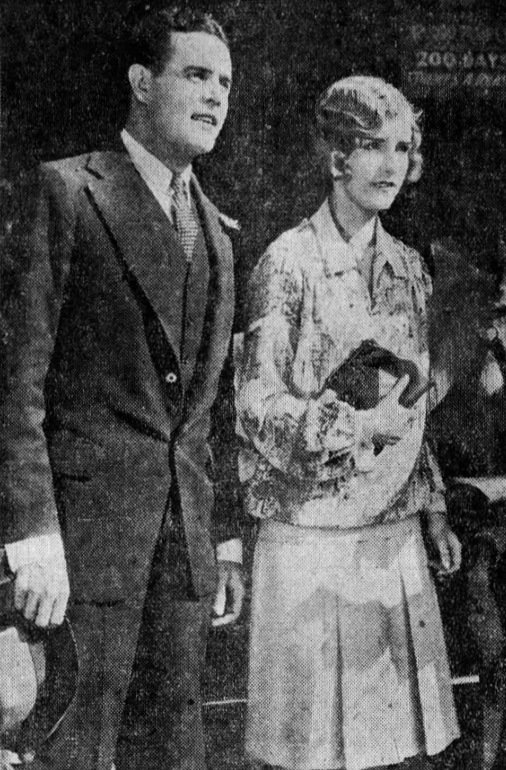
Keefe (left) and Diane Ellis in the 1927 production of Hook and Ladder No. 9

Keefe played in The Poor Nut on stage and was the only member of that cast to appear in the film adaptation. After playing romantic leads in silent films, by 1941 Keefe had changed to "a new career as a character actor". He also acted on radio.

== In popular culture ==
Keefe was the focus of the Homer Hoopee comc strip on February 24, 1940. One of the female characters sought to get her husband to pay more attention to her by going out with Keefe, her old schoolmate who had become a film star.

== Selected filmography ==
- A Society Scandal (1924)
- Those Who Judge (1924)
- Lend Me Your Husband (1924)
- The Law and the Lady (1924)
- The Unguarded Hour (1925)
- The Nut Job (1927)
- Three's a Crowd (1927)
- Satan and the Woman (1928)
- The Man from Headquarters (1928)
- Hearts of Men (1928)
- Thundergod (1928)
- The Cohens and the Kellys in Atlantic City (1929)
- Disorderly Conduct (1932)
- Mystery Liner (1934)
- Thunder in the Night (1934)
- Death from a Distance (1935)
- Western Courage (1935)
- Hong Kong Nights (1935)
- Telephone Operator (1937)
- My Old Kentucky Home (1938)

== Bibliography ==
- Pitts, Michael R. Western Movies: A Guide to 5,105 Feature Films. McFarland, 2012.
