= The Chaser (1928 film) =

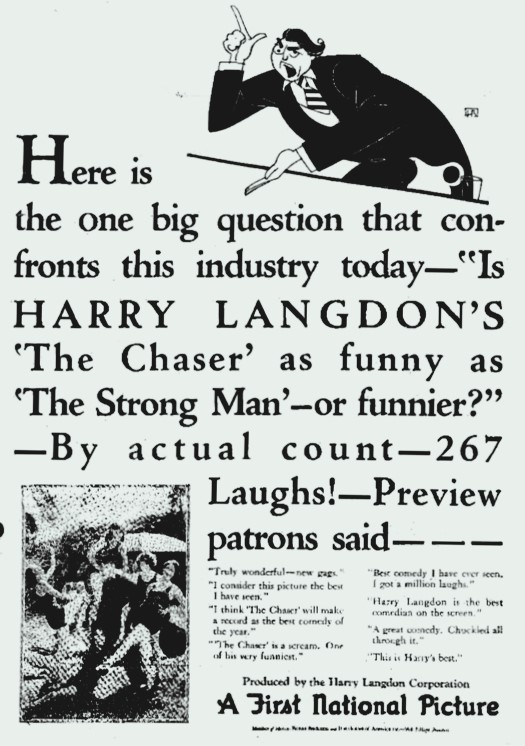
- Advertisement for the film
- Directed by: Harry Langdon
- Screenplay by: Clarence Hennecke; Robert Eddy; Harry McCoy
- Story by: Arthur Ripley
- Starring: Gladys McConnell; Harry Langdon; Helen Hayward
- Cinematography: Frank Evans; Elgin Lessley
- Edited by: Alfred DeGaetano
- Production company: Harry Langdon Corporation
- Distributed by: First National Pictures
- Release date: January 28, 1928
- Running time: 6 reels
- Country: United States
- Language: Silent (English intertitles)

The Chaser is a 1928 comedy film directed by Harry Langdon. It was distributed by First National Pictures.

== Plot ==
Although a Dragon Lady Mother-In-Law may have something to do with it, Harry is judged to be an inattentive husband and his wife sues him for divorce on grounds of cruelty---although she does draw the line at allowing the Mother In Law to shoot him. The judge pronounces an unusual sentence--Harry and his wife will "exchange roles" for 30 days, including wearing each other's clothing. All of their delivery men apparently suffer from poor eyesight,as they unanimously flirt with the "female" Harry.

Harry finally decides to commit suicide and leaves a suicide note that ends with "Don't trust The Iceman". But he drinks castor oil instead of poison and runs away. The wife finds all the "tools of death" in the kitchen and assumes the worst---but Harry has actually slept the night away in the hen house. A muscular friend insists Harry join him for golf----but the temperamental buddy, caught in a sand trap, ends up destroying his clubs on the first hole. Then they discover a campout of bathing beauties. Harry discovers his gaudy Lodge Uniform makes him a sex symbol. After reducing two women to insensibilty, he is banished from the camp as a satyr.

A runaway car has Harry sliding down an impossibly steep hill---and he is catapulted into his own kitchen;landing in the flour barrel. The wife and Mother-In-law arrive to see "Harry's Ghost". The Mother In law flees in terror. But wife and husband sense the absurdity of the situation and embrace.

== Cast ==
- Gladys McConnell as Wife
- Harry Langdon as Husband
- Helen Hayward as Mother
- Bud Jamison as Buddy
- Charles Thurston as Judge
- Frank Brownlee as Repo man

== Reception ==
A contemporary review in the New York Daily News praised the film's casting and claimed that it was not boring. A review in The Plain Dealer was more negative, calling it "average" and "mildly entertaining".
