= A Woman of Experience =

1931 film

- Theatrical poster
- Directed by: Harry Joe Brown
- Screenplay by: John Farrow; Ralph Murphy (add. dialogue)
- Based on: The Registered Woman play by John Farrow
- Produced by: Charles R. Rogers
- Starring: Helen Twelvetrees; William Bakewell; Lew Cody
- Cinematography: Hal Mohr
- Edited by: Fred Allen
- Music by: Arthur Lange
- Production company: RKO Pathé Pictures
- Distributed by: RKO Pathé Pictures
- Release dates: July 8, 1931 (New York City); August 7, 1931 (U.S.)
- Running time: 76 minutes
- Country: United States
- Language: English

A Woman of Experience is a 1931 American pre-Code drama film directed by Harry Joe Brown and starring Helen Twelvetrees, William Bakewell and Lew Cody, based on the play The Registered Woman by John Farrow. During World War I, a woman is rejected for volunteer work because of her dubious reputation, but that same reputation gets her recruited as a spy for Austria.

== Plot ==
In 1914 Vienna, Elsa Elsbergen volunteers for nursing, but her lies hiding her sordid past are discovered and she is turned down. However, Captain Muller believes her patriotism and background are perfect for the Austrian Department of Intelligence. His superior, Major Schmidt, wants her to become very friendly with Captain Otto von Lichstein, who is known to be spying for the enemy. Elsa is disappointed at the use that Schmidt wants to make of her, but accepts the assignment. At a party, she catches von Lichstein's eye and agrees to meet him the next night.

On her way home, she is nearly run down by a horse-drawn cab. Its passenger, Sub-Leutnant Count Karl Runyi of the Royal Navy, is very apologetic and insists on seeing her home. They become strongly attracted to each other, and see each other every night. Schmidt reprimands Elsa, but she refuses to give Karl up and turn her attention to von Lichstein.

Karl had been frustrated at being assigned to an admiral's staff, far from the fighting, but when the opportunity he had been hoping for finally becomes available, he chooses not to volunteer for a dangerous assignment—running a blockade with three submarines—because of Elsa. She, however, persuades him to change his mind, telling him that he would come to hate her if he did not seize his chance at glory. She sends him a letter, which he reads after sailing; in it, she lies and tells him that she has found someone else.

She then becomes von Lichstein's girlfriend. He later has her entertain naval officer Heinrich. The drunk young man is soon boasting to von Lichstein about the exploits of the three submarines, and in particular their secret return route under the very noses of the enemy. Von Lichstein decides that this would be a fitting culmination of his espionage career and prepares to deliver the information personally. Elsa secretly telephones Schmidt to come immediately and holds von Lichstein at gunpoint. However, he splashes his drink in her face, and they struggle for the gun. It goes off, seriously wounding Elsa. Schmidt and his men arrive, so von Lichstein commits suicide.

Karl returns safely and is lauded as a national hero. Then, despite everything, he goes to see Elsa. She admits that there was no other man, and they become engaged. However, Countess Runyi, Karl's mother, knows about Elsa's past. When Elsa refuses to break the engagement, the Countess informs her that she will tell Karl. Katie, Elsa's loyal maid, then reveals Elsa's heroism to the Countess. Although moved, the Countess's mind is set. However, Elsa reveals that, as a result of her wound, she has only six months to live. She marries Karl.

== Cast ==
- Helen Twelvetrees as Elsa Elsbergen
- William Bakewell as Count Karl Runyi
- Lew Cody as Captain Otto von Lichstein
- H. B. Warner as Major Hugh Schmidt
- ZaSu Pitts as Katie
- C. Henry Gordon as Captain Muller
- Nance O'Neil as Countess Runyi
- George Fawcett as A General
- Franklin Pangborn as Hans
- Edward Earle as Captain Kurt von Hausen
- Ashley Buck as Heinrich
- G. Pat Collins as Submarine Captain Franz
- Harvey Clark as Coachman (as Harvey Clarke)

== The Registered Woman ==
The film was based on a play by John Farrow The Registered Woman.

== Reception ==
On its initial 1931 release, The New York Times commented that the film "takes no exception from the tradition of Viennese legends of battle" with characters, setting, music, and plot all typical of films set in wartime Vienna, and that the audience responded to it like "an old friend". Critic Paul Mavis later wrote that the film had "a good performance by Twelvetrees doing what people wanted a female spy to do in 1931." The film was overshadowed by another, similarly themed 1931 release, director Josef von Sternberg's Dishonored starring Marlene Dietrich.
