= The Code of the Scarlet =

1928 film

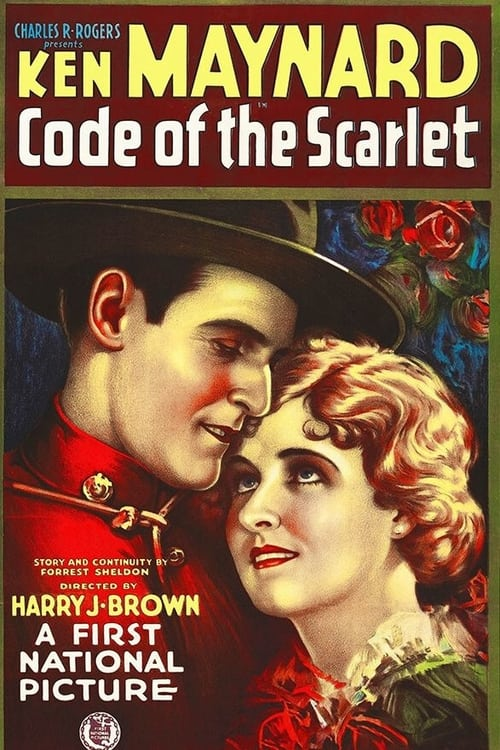
- Directed by: Harry Joe Brown
- Written by: Bennett Cohen; Forrest Sheldon; Ford Beebe
- Produced by: Charles R. Rogers
- Starring: Ken Maynard; Gladys McConnell; Ed Brady
- Cinematography: Ted D. McCord
- Edited by: Fred Allen
- Production company: Charles R. Rogers Productions
- Distributed by: First National Pictures
- Release date: July 1, 1928
- Running time: 57 minutes
- Country: United States
- Languages: Silent; English intertitles

The Code of the Scarlet is a 1928 American silent Western film directed by Harry Joe Brown and starring Ken Maynard, Gladys McConnell and Ed Brady. The title is also sometimes written as just Code of the Scarlet. A northern, it was distributed by First National Pictures.

== Synopsis ==
Mountie Bruce Kenton is on the trial of a fugitive, who unknown to him is the brother of the woman he loves.

== Cast ==
- Ken Maynard as Bruce Kenton
- Gladys McConnell as Helen Morgan
- Ed Brady as Paddy Halloran
- J.P. McGowan as Blake
- Dot Farley as Widow Malone
- Sheldon Lewis as Bartender
- Hal Salter as Comic
- Joe Rickson as Pete
- Robert Walker as Frank Morgan
- Joseph W. Girard as RCMP Inspector
- Nelson McDowell as Fur Trapper
- Lafe McKee as Fur Trapper
- Slim Whitaker as Henchman

== Preservation ==
The Code Of The Scarlet is currently presumed lost. In February of 2021, the film was cited by the National Film Preservation Board on their Lost U.S. Silent Feature Films list.

== Bibliography ==
- Munden, Kenneth White. The American Film Institute Catalog of Motion Pictures Produced in the United States, Part 1. University of California Press, 1997.
