= Paper Bullets =

1941 film by Phil Rosen

- Directed by: Phil Rosen
- Written by: Martin Mooney
- Story by: Martin Mooney
- Produced by: Maurice King (as "Maurice Kozinsky") executive George R. Batcheller associate Frank King (as "Franklyn Kozinsky")
- Starring: Joan Woodbury; Jack La Rue; Linda Ware
- Cinematography: Arthur Martinelli
- Edited by: Martin G. Cohn
- Music by: Johnny Lange; Lew Porter
- Production company: King Brothers Productions
- Distributed by: Producers Releasing Corporation
- Release date: June 13, 1941
- Running time: 72 minutes
- Country: United States
- Language: English
- Budget: $19,000 or $23,000
- Box office: $200,000

Paper Bullets is a 1941 American crime thriller film directed by Phil Rosen and starring Joan Woodbury, Jack La Rue and Linda Ware. It was the first film produced by the King Brothers, launching their career.

The film was re-released by Eagle-Lion Films in 1948 as Gangs, Inc. giving top billing to Alan Ladd, who has a supporting role.

== Plot ==
A young girl, Rita Adams, asks her former gangster father why people call him a snitch. He is then gunned down in front of her. She is sent to an orphanage, where her best friends are Mickey Roma and Bob Elliott.

Rita grows up to be a struggling single girl who lives with her best friend, singer Donna, and who has a drunken boyfriend, Harold De Witt, the son of a rich, powerful man, Clarence. Rita loses her job in a factory when she cannot get bonded. Bob, who is now an aerospace engineer, offers to try to get her work.

When Harold drives Rita home at night, he kills a pedestrian in a hit-and-run while Rita is in the car. Acting on the advice of his father's lawyer, Bruce King, he gets Rita to claim responsibility for the accident, saying that he will be disinherited otherwise and that she will only get probation. She gets sentenced to one to five years in prison.

Rita gets out of prison and her friend from the orphanage, Mickey, who now works in organised crime, explains how Harold betrayed her. Rita takes to crime, robbing gullible men.

Clarence De Witt wants the police to crack down on organised crime and leads a reform ticket.

Jimmy Kelly is a policeman undercover in the gang as Bill Dugan. Kelly/Dugan collects protection money for racketeer Kurt Parrish, who complains that receipts are down because of DeWitt's reform efforts.

Mickey, meanwhile, asks Rita to return the letters in Harold's file which prove his guilt, but she has her plan for revenge and buys radio time to speak out against DeWitt's hypocrisy. This wins her a meeting with Parrish and mobster Lou Wood, and after Rita negotiates a place for herself in the syndicate, she then visits DeWitt with photocopies of the letters. Spurning DeWitt's offer of money, Rita forces him to use his political influence for the syndicate's benefit, prompting Jimmy to observe that Parrish is using votes, or "paper bullets", to take control.

When Mickey learns that the real Dugan is in prison, Jimmy is abducted by Parrish's men, and the ensuing pursuit by the police ends in an accident. Joe persuades the newspapers to print the false information that Jimmy was killed in the crash, which devastates Donna, who has fallen in love with him.

Rita then quits the syndicate to marry Bob, but immediately after the wedding she is arrested and indicted along with Parrish, Wood and DeWitt. During the trial, the courtroom spectators are shocked when Jimmy takes the stand, and all four defendants are convicted. As Bob comforts Rita and promises to wait for her, children play at the playground she built as a monument to the innocence of youth.

== Cast ==
- Joan Woodbury as Rita Adams
- Jack La Rue as Mickey Roman
- Linda Ware as Donna Andrews
- John Archer as Bob Elliott
- Vince Barnett as Scribbler, a petty forger
- Alan Ladd as Jimmy Kelly aka Bill Dugan
- Gavin Gordon as Kurt Parrish
- Phillip Trent as Harold DeWitt
- William Halligan as Police Chief Flynn
- George Pembroke as Clarence DeWitt
- Selmer Jackson as District Attorney
- Kenneth Harlan as Jim Adams
- Bryant Washburn as Attorney Bruce King
- Stephen Chase as Detective Joe Kent
- Robert Strange as Lou Wood
- Alex Callam as Joe Fagan
- Harry Depp as Johnny Mason

== Production ==
The Kozinsky Brothers were businessmen who wanted to get into slot machines. They needed films for the machines and had a bad experience sourcing films from Cecil B. De Mille which prompted them to get into film production. They had a story written by Martin Mooney about two orphans who grew up in a life of crime. They formed KB Productions and made a verbal deal with Producers Releasing Corporation where they got $19,500 and 50% of the profits.

The film was shot at Talisman Studios. It had its production budget doubled.

The Kozinsky Brothers knew Jack LaRue from the racetrack (they owned some horses) and liked his performance in A Farewell to Arms; he was cast in the lead. They spoke with Rochelle Hudson about the female lead but did not like it when she arrived at a meeting with her husband and two agents as "it reminded them of De Mille". They ended up casting the more easy-going Joan Woodbury.

The film took six days to shoot. When it was done Monogram offered the brothers $50,000 plus 50% of the profits to have it, as there was only a verbal agreement with PRC. However the Kozinskys went with PRC because "our word is as good as our bond."

== Soundtrack ==
- "I Know, I Know" (by Vic Knight, Johnny Lange and Lew Porter) – sung by Linda Ware
- "Blue Is the Day" (by Maurice Kozinsky, Johnny Lange and Lew Porter) – sung by Linda Ware

== Reception ==
The movie was highly regarded and was the first film distributed by the Producers Releasing Corporation into Loew's Circuit. It launched their careers as film producers.

Jimmy Fidler wrote that the film "proves a buck's worth of entertainment can be made for a dime – by a guy who knows how."

Distribution rights later transferred to Eagle-Lion Films who re-released the film as Gangs Inc. The King brothers sued Eagle for breach of contract asking for revenue.
