= The Drop Kick =

1927 film

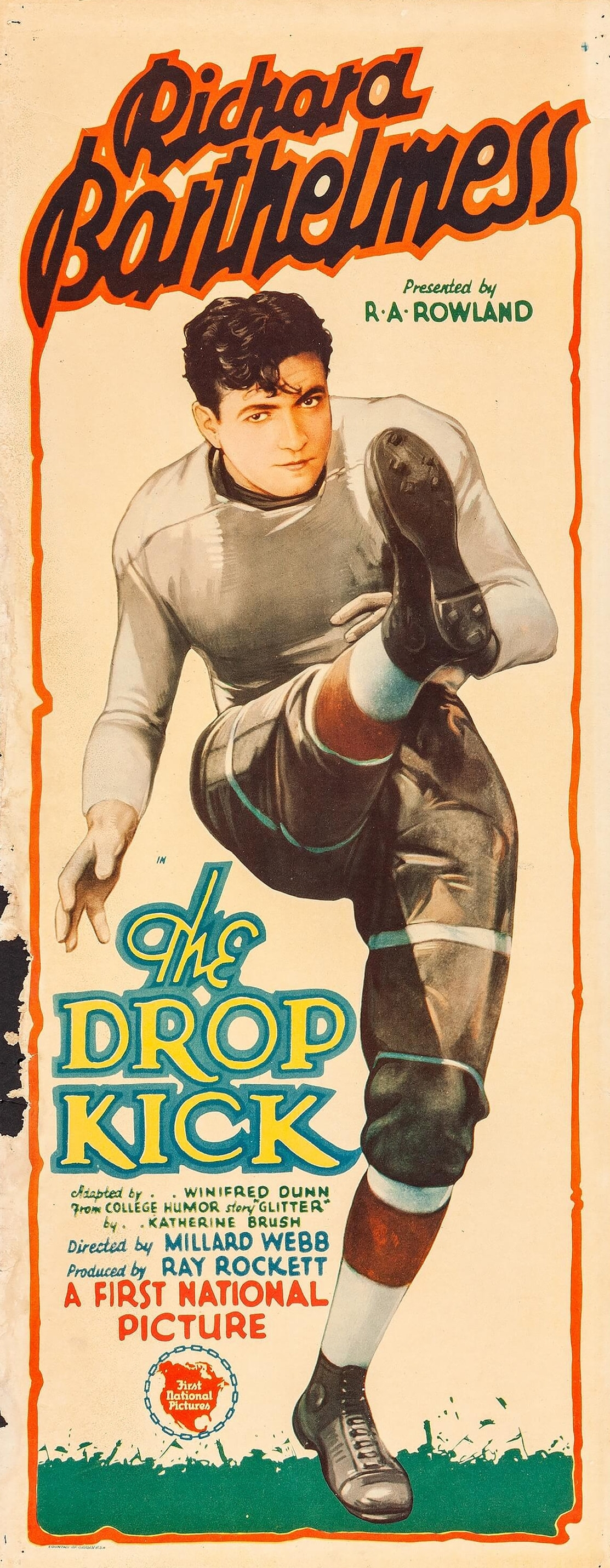
- Theatrical release three-sheet poster
- Directed by: Millard Webb
- Written by: Winifred Dunn (scenario)
- Screenplay by: Dwinelle Benthall (titles); Rufus McCosh (titles)
- Based on: Glitter by Katherine Brush
- Produced by: Richard A. Rowland; Ray Rockett
- Starring: Richard Barthelmess; Hedda Hopper; Dorothy Revier; Barbara Kent
- Cinematography: Arthur Edeson; Alvin Knechtel
- Production company: First National Pictures
- Distributed by: First National Pictures
- Release date: September 25, 1927
- Running time: 62 minutes
- Country: United States
- Language: Silent (English intertitles)

The Drop Kick (1927)

The Drop Kick (also known as Glitter in the UK) is a 1927 American silent film directed by Millard Webb, adapted from the novel Glitter (1925) by Katherine Brush, about a college football player (Richard Barthelmess). It was one of the early films of John Wayne who was only aged 20 in the film. He too played a college footballer.

== Plot ==
The film opens on a shot of a party, then focuses in on a couple. A title card introduces the man as Jack Hamill, "... an all around athlete -- his 'approach' sure -- his 'stroke' swift, and his 'service' - perfect." Jack tells his date, Molly, that he must return home to pack, as he must leave for "the old College" the next morning. A title card introduces Molly as "a popular partner" and she tells Jack 9pm is too early to go home, and she's used to "staying out till a respectable hour!" Molly begans to rant, her back to Jack. Jack grabs her hand, tries to interrupt her, but eventually gives up, and passes her hand to a passerby without Molly noticing and leaves the party.

Jack returns home where his mother (his "best pal" as well) is hosting two women, Miss Graves and Miss Cecily, who the butler tells Jack have arrived unexpectedly for the weekend. Jack tries to hide behind the butler and go up to his room, but his mother spots him and tells him to join the party. A title card says "In Cecily's dreams of romance, Jack was always the hero." Sure enough she stares at him besotted as he enters the room. Jack asks what became of the little girl with curls he used to pull, and Miss Graves tells Jack that Cecily has "quite grown up" and that Cecily would be accompanying Jack's mother to the Shoreham-Central football game. Jack's mother tells Cecily that if she treats him nice, he might invite her to Thanksgiving Prom. Jack tells his mom it's late and he really must go to bed.

The next day opens on the first day of school at Shoreham College. We see Psi Upsilon fraternity members moving in for the semester, and a title card tells us that facing fraternity row was "the pride of the Campus - the Honeymoon Cottage of their popular coach, Brad Hathaway. We see Brad, and a title card tells us that while he "found it easy to settle down" he was "finding it harder to settle up." Brad sits at a desk looking at a bill with worry. It is from a shop in San Francisco, and is for 1 evening wrap and 1 evening gown, totaling $700. He brings the bill to his wife, Eunice, who is fixing her hair. A title card tells us "Eunice liked being the only bride on the Campus - but shed didn't intend to let it cramp her style." When Brad confronts Eunice with the bill, she yells at him for always talking about money, and says that as she returned the diamond jewelry she ought to be entitled to new clothes.

Jack and his roommate "Bones" Barton pull up to Brad's house. Bones asks Jack if it's really Brad he's come to see, or if he wants to see his "old sweetie" Eunice. Brad punches Bones playfully, then honks for Brad to come out. Brad rushes out and shakes hands gleefully with Jack. Eunice comes out, runs up to Jack, and kisses him on the lips. Brad chastises her, saying that Brad is his best friend and Eunice is now his wife. Eunice brushes it off, asking "what's a husband between friends?" Pemberton, the assistant coach, is introduced as a man who "resented any popularity - except his own." He looks on from across the street and says "Look at the College Widow, putting on her old vamp act! Poor Brad!"

With classes beginning, all new footballers are told to report to the practice field at 4pm. The scene opens showing the boys hustle out of the locker room. Dean Carson is introduced as a former full-back and most popular faculty member. Carson tells Brad that with a good season, and the money on hand from last year, the new club house is "a certainty." Pemberton calls for Brad, telling him the men are ready for practice. The team does drills on the practice field. Jack impresses the team and coach with his drop kick through the goal posts. Some of the boys poor water on the assistant coach.

A title card transitions us forward to Thanksgiving. Jack is said to have made new football history, and his "proud mother and a thrilled Cecily" come to town to stay at the Shoreham Inn for the Thanksgiving holidays. The two women sit and anxiously watch a clock. Cecily worries that Jack has forgotten that he is going to take her to prom. His mother reassures her, then there's a knock at the door. Brad enters, greets his mother, then moves over to greet Cecily. A moment later, when Cecily's walked out of earshot, he tells his mother "you can never accuse me of not being the dutiful, obliging son." The couple leaves for the prom and Jack kisses his mother goodbye.

A large school dance party spills out of the gymnasium. Jack and Cecily dance, and Jack sees Eunice dancing with another man. Eunice notices the couple and looks dismayed, before her partner leads her out onto the dance floor.

Meanwhile, in the Dean's office, Brad sits before the dean and an auditor. The dean tells Brad that according to the auditor, his books are ten thousand dollars short. Brad insists there must be some mistake, and the dean assures him that he's sure there is, but they have to get it straightened out right away. The dean tells brad he must make his report by the end of the week, and to get his accounts together and they'll go over them the next day. Brad assures him he'll have them ready.

Back on the dance floor, Jack invites a man over to sit with Cecily, then walks off. The man he'd just left with her tells Cecily he already has this dance, and he must go, leaving Cecily alone. Jack and Eunice begin to dance and kiss, angering Cecily. Ben asks Eunice where Brad is and why he isn't there. She tells him that Brad got an mysterious phone call after lunch and left her "in the lurch," so she had "Dear old Pem" bring her to the dance. A man approaches Cecily, and asks to dance. She declines, but he insists and pulls her up off the bench, into his arms, and onto the dance floor. Jack sees the two dancing and how clearly uncomfortable Cecily is as the man tries to kiss her. Cecily storms off and Jack follows her into a clearing in the trees away from the dance.

Jack finds her alone, sitting in the grass and crying. He sits beside her, and she tells him "I shouldn't have come - I don't know how to be like these other girls. I just can't kiss and pet the way the boys expect me to." Jack assures her that she's prettier than all of them. She looks unsure, but Jack says he'd never thought about it until he saw her dancing "with that chump ... then [he] wanted to choke him." Cecily looks pleased, and the scene fades to a title card saying that "during the next few days, Jack spent most of his time finding out just how different Cecily was."

Jack, his mother, and Cecily all sit in a room, Jack and Cecily on the couch talking and holding hands. Jack look sat the clock and says he must go, as tomorrow's the big game and he must be in bed at ten. Cecily offers no fight, smiles and bids him farewell. She tells him that she knows he's going to win, and all her thoughts are with her. Jack hints to his mother that she should go to bed, then asks Cecily if she could kiss him, just once. They share a passionate kiss, and Cecily says she doesn't mind it, with Jack it's different. Jack says that everything in the world is different since he found her. Jack gives her his fraternity pin, asking if she knows what that means, as no other girl has ever worn it. They kiss again and say a slow goodbye as they shut the door.

A title card transitions us to another scene, telling us that Brad is frantic and sick with dread and shame before "the rising tide of disaster." His eyes go wide and he begins to breathe heavily as he examines a paper. The dean comes to his door, and asks Brad "where's that statement he promised" and asks what it means. The dean is angry. Eunice is seen listening through the door as Brad says "Can't you understand? The money's gone, I stole it!" The dean asks if Brad knows what he's saying, and that even if he were to return the money it would mean dismissal and disgrace. The dean leaves, and Eunice comes out from her room. With hands on hips, she asks him a question and he responds (there are no dialogue cards for what they say), then she looks up at him indignantly and says "So -- I've married a common thief!" Brad holds her and pleads with her (again no dialogue for what he says) before Eunice says that he can't drag her down with him, to get out of the house, and that she never wants to see him again. She runs to her room and locks the door on Brad. When he leaves, she comes out to watch him go from the window.

Jack walks out and sits on a nearby stump. Eunice smiles, and wanders over to pick up the phone. She calls Jack and asks him to come over. He tells her he can't, but Eunice says that something terrible has happened and that "they" need him. Brad hangs up the phone, and Eunice goes to apply fresh makeup. Jack arrives, and Eunice pretends to have been sobbing in bed. When Jack approaches her to ask if she is all right, she tells him that Brad has been neglecting her and that she's so depressed she could die. Jack says he's sure Brad wouldn't do that. Brad returns, sits at the desk with the phone, and begins to write a note. Eunice pulls jack close and tries to kiss him. Jack refuses, separates her, and tells her off. Brad finishes his note and writes Jack's name on the envelope. Brad then pulls a gun out of a drawer. Back in the bedroom, Jack says he'll leave and speak with Brad, but Eunice begs him not to leave her alone and begins kissing him. Outside, Brad shoots himself. Eunice and Jack pull apart and look in the direction of the sound. Frat members playing poker turn around at the noise from the fraternity house. Jack is the first to find Brad's body, and the others arrive shortly. Eunice looks horrified and runs away. A man asks Jack if he was present when this happened, and Jack says he was with Eunice. Eunice returns to the phone but before making a call finds Brad's note to Jack. She opens it and it says:

"Dear Jack, I can't face the boys. I took the money they trusted me with and spent it. This may be a coward's way out but it seems the only way. You'll forgive me because you love me and" (the note continues on a second page) "I know that you love Eunice. Save her from any scandal. Don't let her suffer for this, Jack. Goodbye, Brad."

Jack returns to the house, where Eunice answers the door. She invites him in but he refuses. She says that if he won't come in, then they must talk in the garden, as it's important. Under a gazebo, Jack asks why she sent for him. She asks if Jack knows why Brad shot himself. Jack says no, and Eunice says it's because Brad saw them together in the bedroom and hands him only the second page of Brad's note. Jack reads the note, then dismayed leans against the wall of the gazebo and puts his face in his arms. Eunice fakes tears and asks what will become of her, as all the boys know Jack was at the house that night, and that people will talk. Jack looks at her, then looks at the ground at the spot where Brad's body had fallen and pictures him there. He thinks about Brad's last request in the letter and tells Eunice, "I'll marry you - I guess Brad meant it that way - " Eunice moves to kiss Jack, but he rebuffs her and walks away. Alone, Jack breaks down and lies on the ground.

The next day, Jack's mother is ready to leave, but Cecily is sitting down at a table and crying. When his mother asks Cecily why she isn't ready for the game, Cecily shows her a note from Jack that simply says "Cecily - please forget me - and forgive me if you can. Jack." Jack's mother looks perplexed and says that she knows he wouldn't do anything like this, and that she must go find out what is wrong. Cecily seems to beg the mother not to get involved, but she insists and leaves. At the frat house, Jack's mother speaks with Pem, who says that Jack told him he planned to marry Eunice, and seemed concerned about a letter he was reading. The second page of Brad's letter is on the desk, and Jack's mom reads it. She notices the staple mark and tells Pem to make sure Cecily makes it to the game and she'll meet them there.

At her cottage, Eunice fusses over her outfit, clearly trying to make herself look like a sad but very stylish and attractive widow. She feigns tears when Jack's mom arrives at the door. She introduces herself and Eunice invites her in. Jack's mom tells Eunice that she's so sorry for her, and that Jack has explained everything, and mentions her husband's letter. Eunice looks shocked. Jack's mom produces the letter from her purse, and asks Eunice how much she wants for the other half of the letter. Eunice objects, but Jack's mom tells her that she doesn't intend to let her ruin Jack's life, and that before she allows Eunice to marry him, she'll cut Jack off without a penny. Jack's mom goes to the desk to write a check. Eunice stands over her, and doesn't realize that Jack's mother can see her in the mirror, and sees that her fake tears have stopped. Eunice quickly resumes her act as the scene fade.

A title card transitions us to the Shoreham-Central game, saying that the game has brought a record crowd for the season. Thousands swarm the stadium., the band marches on the field, and finally the players run out of the tunnel to a standing ovation from the crowd. The captains shake hands with each other and the coin flip officiant. Jack's mom and Cecily are in the stands. The game kicks off, and on the first kick off there is a fumble and a turnover. After a turnover on downs, Jack receives the ball and leads a huddle. He breaks through the line and makes a good run, but trips, fumbles, and turns over the ball. In a later play, Jack is the last defender before an oncoming runner, but suddenly he pictures the runner as Brad, freezes, and lets the opponent run past for a touchdown. His teammates chastise him and Cecily looks on sadly. Central College's team kicks for the extra point and at half time the game is 7-0. Later a Shoreham player successfully runs a touchdown, and Jack prepares to kick the extra point. His hands shake, and he misses the extra point, leading to the crowd booing and chanting for his dismissal. The coaches call in a substitute player for Jack. Jack argues but takes his helmet off and leaves the field. Shoreham struggles brutally, and near the end of the last quarter it is still 7-6. Shoreham recovers the ball on a fumble and Jack wrings his hands nervously. He begs to be put in to get the last 3 points they need to win. Pem is unsure but Jack begs for another chance, assuring him he can do it. With two minutes left in the game, Jack subs back in. He drives the ball within field goal range with some highly impressive plays. The crowd chants his name. With one minute left, Jack prepares a drop kick field goal try from forty yards. The crowd stands. Jack receives the ball, and successfully kicks the field goal, winning the game.

The crowd explodes in celebration. The dean finds Jack's mother in the crowd and shakes her hand. She says something to him and hands him the note out of her purse. He reads it, then shakes her hand again, telling her that he'll make sure the boys understand. She leads Cecily out of the stadium by her hand. Later at the hotel, Jack's mom kisses him and tells him she's proud of him, and asks if he's heard that Eunice is leaving for a long visit to Europe. She show shim the first page of the letter, and he breaks down in relief. He kisses his mother and runs to greet Cecily by the pond. He takes her hands in his and kisses her as the movie fades to the end card.

== Cast ==
- Richard Barthelmess as Jack Hamill
- Barbara Kent as Cecily Graves
- Dorothy Revier as Mrs. Hathaway
- Eugene Strong as Brad Hathaway
- Alberta Vaughn as Molly
- Brooks Benedict as Ed Pemberton
- Hedda Hopper as Mrs. Hamill
- Mayme Kelso as Mrs. Graves
- George C. Pearce as The Dean
- John Wayne as USC Football Player
- James Bradbury Jr. as The Rival to Hamill

== Preservation ==
A mute silent print was transferred onto 16 mm film by Associated Artists Productions in the 1950s and in 1960s by United Artists Television. Prints of the film are preserved at the Library of Congress and the Wisconsin Center for Film and Theater Research, Madison.

== See also ==
- List of American football films
