= The Flying Horseman =

1926 film

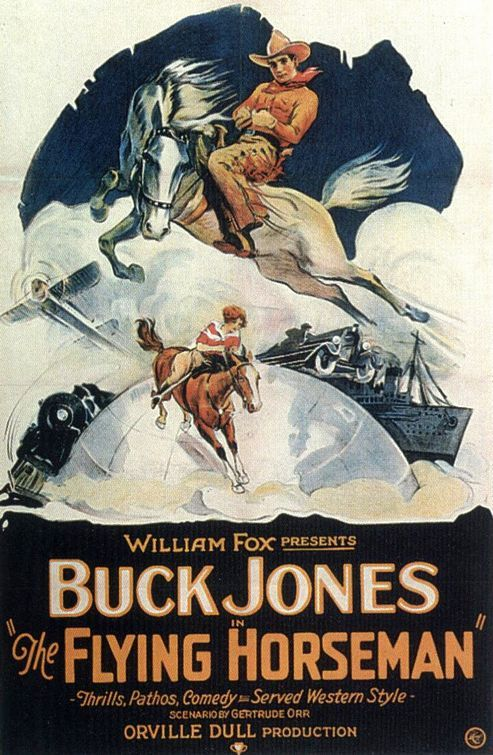
- Theatrical release poster
- Directed by: Orville O. Dull
- Screenplay by: Gertrude Orr
- Based on: Dark Rosaleen by Max Brand
- Starring: Buck Jones; Gladys McConnell; Bruce Covington; Walter Percival; Hank Mann; Harvey Clark
- Cinematography: Joseph August
- Production company: Fox Film Corporation
- Distributed by: Fox Film Corporation
- Release date: September 5, 1926
- Running time: 50 minutes
- Country: United States
- Languages: Silent; English intertitles

The Flying Horseman is a 1926 American silent Western film directed by Orville O. Dull and written by Gertrude Orr. The film stars Buck Jones, Gladys McConnell, Bruce Covington, Walter Percival, Hank Mann, and Harvey Clark. The film was released on September 5, 1926, by Fox Film Corporation.

== Cast ==
- Buck Jones as Mark Winton
- Gladys McConnell as June Savary
- Bruce Covington as Col. Savary
- Walter Percival as Bert Ridley
- Hank Mann as Newton Carey
- Harvey Clark as Happy Joe
- Vester Pegg as Henchman
- Joe Rickson as Henchman
- Silver as Silver Dollar
