= Our Neighbors – The Carters =

1939 film by Ralph Murphy

- Directed by: Ralph Murphy
- Screenplay by: S.K. Lauren
- Story by: Renaud Hoffman
- Produced by: Charles R. Rogers
- Starring: Fay Bainter; Frank Craven; Edmund Lowe; Genevieve Tobin; Mary Thomas; Mildred Coles
- Cinematography: George Barnes
- Edited by: William Shea
- Music by: Victor Young
- Production company: Paramount Pictures
- Distributed by: Paramount Pictures
- Release date: November 24, 1939
- Running time: 85 minutes
- Country: United States
- Language: English

Our Neighbors – The Carters is a 1939 American comedy film directed by Ralph Murphy and written by S.K. Lauren. The film stars Fay Bainter, Frank Craven, Edmund Lowe, Genevieve Tobin, Mary Thomas and Mildred Coles. The film was released on November 24, 1939, by Paramount Pictures.

== Cast ==
- Fay Bainter as Ellen Carter
- Frank Craven as Doc Carter
- Edmund Lowe as Bill Hastings
- Genevieve Tobin as Gloria Hastings
- Mary Thomas as Mattie Carter
- Mildred Coles as Gloria Carter
- Scotty Beckett as Dickie Carter
- Benny Bartlett as Junior Carter
- Donald Brenon as Paul Carter
- Nana Bryant as Louise Wilcox
- Thurston Hall as Mr. Guilfoyle
- Granville Bates as Joseph Laurence
- Edward McWade as Pop Hagen
- Norman Phillips Jr. as Henry Laurence
- Richard Clayton as Peter Bush
- Frank Reicher as Dr. Proser
