= Fred Allen (film editor) =

American film editor and film director

- Born: December 16, 1896; Petaluma, California, United States
- Died: May 22, 1955 (aged 58)
- Occupations: Film editor Film director Writer

Fred S. Allen (December 16, 1896 – May 22, 1955) was an American film editor, and occasional director and writer.

Born in Petaluma, California, Allen was active from 1921 through 1955, and is credited with editing over 100 movies. In silent films, he worked with Mack Sennett and Thomas H. Ince, and appears to be most active at Republic Pictures and RKO Radio Pictures. His seven directorial credits are all Westerns.

== Selected filmography ==
- Shadows of Conscience (1921)
- Bulldog Courage (1922)
- Brand of Cowardice (1925)
- The Glorious Trail (1928)
- The Code of the Scarlet (1928)
- Cheyenne (1929)
- Señor Americano (1929)
- Pardon My Gun (1930)
- Oklahoma Cyclone (1930)
- A Woman of Experience (1931)
- Freighters of Destiny (1931) – producer and director
- Ride Him, Cowboy (1932)
- Beyond the Rockies (1932)
- Charlie Chan in Reno (1939)
- Secrets of Scotland Yard (1944)
- Scotland Yard Investigator (1945)
- Gangs of the Waterfront (1945)
- Calendar Girl (1947)
- T-Men (1947)
- Love from a Stranger (1947)
- The Vicious Years (1950)
- Gold Raiders (1951)
- I Dream of Jeanie (1952)
- City That Never Sleeps (1953)
- Champ for a Day (1953)
- The Atomic Kid (1954)
- Make Haste to Live (1954)
- Hell's Half Acre (1954)
- The Eternal Sea (1955)
