= James Bradbury Jr. =

American actor (1894-1936)

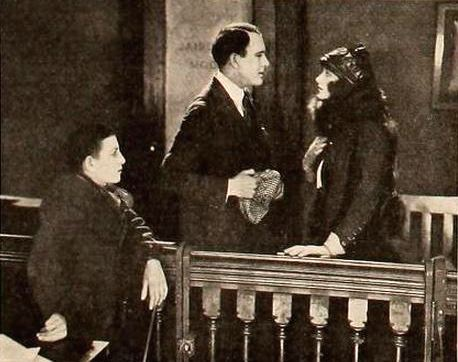
- James Bradbury Jr. (left) in Deadline at Eleven (1920)
- Born: James Horatio Bradbury Jr. October 5, 1894; New York City, U.S.
- Died: June 21, 1936 (aged 41); Los Angeles, California, United States

James Horatio Bradbury Jr. (October 5, 1894 – June 21, 1936) was an American character actor in supporting roles on stage and in films of the 1920s and 1930s.

== Biography ==
The son of veteran character actor James Horatio Bradbury (1857–1940) and former actress Ruth Drake Torbett, New York-born Bradbury Jr. began his career on stage as a child in Madame Butterfly. In 1919, following his military service in World War I, he arrived in Hollywood. Notable roles included Richard Barthelmess' romantic rival in both Classmates (1924) and The Drop Kick (1927), as well as appearances in numerous budget westerns such as Cheyenne (1929), Smilin' Guns (1929) and The Cisco Kid (1931).

Bradbury also co-authored, with Edward Poland, one of his own stage vehicles, a well-received vaudeville playlet entitled "Psycho Bill", which debuted in June 1921 at Proctor's 23rd Street Theatre in Manhattan. By no later than December of that year, James Bradbury Sr. had joined the cast, portraying the father of Bradbury Jr.'s protagonist. The two also collaborated on at least one other vaudeville sketch, "Solitaire," in 1928, written by Bradley Jr. and staged by his father.

Although Bradbury was featured in the Mascot serial The Shadow of the Eagle (1932) his roles trended towards the smaller and uncredited, as in Warner Brothers' Night Nurse (1931) and Paramount's Dancers in the Dark (1932), and even in what promised to be a high profile appearance in one of his last films, as the "third vampire" opposite Bela Lugosi in Tod Browning's Mark of the Vampire (1935), ended up on the cutting room floor.

== Personal life and death ==
Bradbury never married; indeed, apart from casual film acquaintances such as Viola Dana and Philo McCullough (cited in a July 1927 news item dubbing Bradbury "an enthusiastic swimmer" and frequenter of "various beach clubs [and] seaside homes"), one of the few individuals with whom he was reported to have a personal relationship—apart from family of origin—was actor Robert Armstrong, described in that same 1927 story as "an old friend and stage associate from the east [to whom Bradbury] has been extending hospitality lately in various other directions." Not quite two months later, it was reported by Oakland Tribune that the two were on the verge of being paired by an undisclosed "big studio" as a comedy team in a series of upcoming films, a project which evidently never got beyond the planning stage. The following month, the Los Angeles Evening Citizen News reported that Armstrong was one of ten guests attending a birthday party Bradbury Jr. had given for his father.

On June 21, 1936, after having concluded that the "buddy" to whom he had recently entrusted over two hundred fifty dollars for the purpose of purchasing travelers checks had simply absconded with the funds, Bradford made an attempt to kill himself by turning on the gas in his room on West 11th Street in Los Angeles. Eventually growing impatient, he lit a match, setting off a gas explosion, thus turning himself, as reported by the Los Angeles Daily News, "into a human torch." Within two hours of his arrival at Georgia Street Receiving Hospital, Bradbury had died, at age 41.

== Partial filmography ==
- Bits of Life (1921)
- Classmates (1924)
- Fear-Bound (1925)
- Exclusive Rights (1926)
- Kentucky Handicap (1926)
- The Little Giant (1926)
- The Wreck (1927)
- Babe Comes Home (1927)
- Hidden Aces (1927)
- The Drop Kick (1927)
- She's a Sheik (1927)
- Hellship Bronson (1928)
- Flying Romeos (1928)
- The Glorious Trail (1928)
- Code of the Air (1928)
- Cheyenne (1929)
- Smilin' Guns (1929)
- Alibi (1929) (uncredited)
- The Great Meadow (1931) (uncredited)
- The Cisco Kid (1931)
- Monkey Business (1931) (uncredited)
- Soul of the Slums (1931)
- Gorilla Ship (1932)
- The Shadow of the Eagle (1932) Mascot serial
- Between Fighting Men (1932)
- Song of the Eagle (1933)
- Mark of the Vampire (1935) (uncredited)
