= The Star Maker (1939 film) =

1939 film by Roy Del Ruth

- Theatrical release poster
- Directed by: Roy Del Ruth
- Written by: Frank Butler; Don Hartman; Arthur Caesar
- Story by: Arthur Caesar; William A. Pierce
- Produced by: Charles R. Rogers
- Starring: Bing Crosby; Louise Campbell; Linda Ware; Ned Sparks; Laura Hope Crews; Janet Waldo; Walter Damrosch
- Cinematography: Karl Struss
- Edited by: Alma Macrorie
- Music by: Alfred Newman
- Production company: Paramount Pictures
- Distributed by: Paramount Pictures
- Release date: August 25, 1939
- Running time: 94 minutes
- Country: United States
- Language: English

The Star Maker is a 1939 American musical film directed by Roy Del Ruth, written by Frank Butler, Don Hartman and Arthur Caesar, and starring Bing Crosby, Louise Campbell, Linda Ware, Ned Sparks, Laura Hope Crews, Janet Waldo and Walter Damrosch. Filming started in Hollywood on April 17, 1939 and was finished in June. The film was released on August 25, 1939, by Paramount Pictures, and had its New York premiere on August 30, 1939. It was the only film in which Crosby played a happily married man.

== Plot ==
Loosely based on the life of vaudevillian Gus Edwards, the film follows the career of aspiring song writer Larry Earl (Crosby) who gives up his job as a night clerk and marries Mary (Louise Campbell). He is anxious to get his songs published and buys a piano which they can ill afford. He sees children performing in the street and has an idea to develop and produce their talent on stage. Initially he cannot obtain any bookings but Mary persuades an agent to give her husband a chance. The one night try-out is a success and he forms "Larry Earl Kiddie Productions" which in due course has 14 productions running in various towns. Larry Earl opens a Broadway musical called School Days, the crowning point of his career, but halfway through the first performance it is closed down by the Children's Welfare Society as they will not allow children under 12 years of age to work past 10 p.m. All of Earl's productions have to be closed down too. Earl had developed the career of Jane Gray (Linda Ware) and he transfers her contract to Walter Damrosch and she performs for him at Carnegie Hall. Later Earl realizes that he can still use children on radio and the film closes with him singing with a children's chorus on a radio show.

== Cast ==
- Bing Crosby as Larry Earl
- Louise Campbell as Mary
- Linda Ware as Jane Gray
- Ned Sparks as 'Speed' King
- Laura Hope Crews as Carlotta Salvini
- Janet Waldo as Stella
- Walter Damrosch as Walter Damrosch
- Thurston Hall as Mr. Proctor
- Clara Blandick as Miss Esther Jones
- Oscar O'Shea as Mr. Flannigan
- John Gallaudet as Duke
- Ben Welden as Joe Gimlick
- Emory Parnell as Mr. Olson
- Dorothy Vaughan as Mrs. Riley
- Bodil Rosing as Mrs. Swanson
- Paul Stanton as Mr. Coyle
- Morgan Wallace as Lou Morris
- Richard Denning as Assistant Dance Director
- Joseph Crehan as Old Gentleman
- Ethel Griffies as Voice Teacher
- Frank Faylen as First Reporter
- Billy Gilbert as Steel Worker
- Grace Hayle as Rural Mother
- Johnnie Morris as Newsboy
- Selmer Jackson as Doctor
- Sig Arno as Ballet Master
- Ralph Faulkner as Fencing Master
- Earl Dwire as Mac, the Accountant
- Harry C. Bradley as Conductor
- Wally Maher as Reporter
- George Eldredge as Reporter
- Stanley Price as Reporter
- George Guhl as Piano Mover
- Jimmie Dundee as Second Piano Mover
- Max Wagner as Third Piano Mover
- Ralph Sanford as Uniformed Doorman
- A.S. 'Pop' Byron as Stage Doorman
- Allen Fox as Photographer
- Fritzi Brunette as Cutie's Mother
- Edwin Stanley as Gerry Member
- Ottola Nesmith as Elderly Lady
- Jack Pennick as Prizefighter
- George C. Pearce as Gerry Society Member
- Doro Merande as Gerry Society Woman
- Frances Raymond as Gerry Society Woman
- Kenneth Wilson as Ken
- Billy Simms as Spike
- Donald Brenon as Judge
- Patti McCarty as Patsy
- John Andrews as Andy
- Danny Daniels as Blackie
- Don Hulbert as Duck
- Gloria Atherton as Curly
- Darryl Hickman as Boots
- Dorothy Babb as Dottie
- Dante DiPaolo as Turkey
- Tommy Batten as Bats
- Mary Ellen Bergren as Ivories
- Gene Collins as Dummy
- Eugene Eberle as Whitey
- Dolores Dianne as Rusty
- Joe Geil as Red
- Richard Humphries as Chicago
- Jackie McGee as Lucky
- Joyce Arleen as Toots
- Roland Dupree as Frenchy
- Marilyn Marlin as Ginger
- Patsy Parsons as Cookie
- Jean Ruth as Butch
- Leon Tyler as Big Ears
- Howard Smiley as Skipper
- Marilyn McKay as Cutie
- Dena Penn as Penny

== Soundtrack ==
- "Jimmy Valentine" (Edward Madden / Gus Edwards) sung by Bing Crosby.
- "A Man and His Dream" (James V. Monaco. Johnny Burke) sung by Bing Crosby.
- "If I Was a Millionaire" (Will D. Cobb / Gus Edwards) sung by Bing Crosby and children.
- "Go Fly a Kite" (James V. Monaco / Johnny Burke) sung by Bing Crosby and children.
- "I Wonder Who's Kissing Her Now" sung by Bing Crosby.
- "Sunbonnet Sue" (Will D. Cobb / Gus Edwards) sung by children
- "In My Merry Oldsmobile" sung by Bing Crosby and children.
- "Darktown Strutters' Ball" sung by Linda Ware
- "An Apple for the Teacher" sung by Linda Ware, Bing Crosby and children.
- "School Days" sung by Linda Ware, Bing Crosby and children.
- "Waltz of the Flowers" sung by Linda Ware
- "Still the Bluebird Sings" (James V. Monaco / Johnny Burke) sung by Bing Crosby and children.

Bing Crosby recorded a number of the songs for Decca Records. "An Apple for the Teacher" (recorded with Connee Boswell) was a huge hit reaching the No. 2 position in the charts. "Go Fly a Kite" and "A Man and His Dream" also reached the top 10. Crosby's songs were also included in the Bing's Hollywood series.

== Reception ==
Frank S. Nugent of The New York Times was not impressed. "'The Star Maker,' the new Bing Crosby film at the Paramount, was inspired (to employ a euphemism) by the career of Gus Edwards, a show-minded Pied Piper who used to swing around the old vaudeville circuits followed by precocious little song and dance teams — the girls in sunbonnets, the boys in newsies' tatters — who grew up, or at least some of them did, to become Walter Winchell, George Jessel, Eddie Cantor and Mervyn LeRoy...There isn't much more to the picture. Mr. Crosby sings in his usual lullaby manner and hasn't many good lines to play with. Ned Sparks sneaks away with a comic scene or two as the child-hating press agent who has to tell bedtime stories and spins a grim whopper about the mean old wolf who gobbled up the little kiddies... But it is all, if Mr. Edwards will pardon us, too much like a Gus Edwards revue and far too much of that."

Variety was far more positive. "Film is first-class entertainment, a lively combination of the conventional backstage story, which is played for comedy angles, and filmusical technique, that is up to best standards...Audiences will quickly and cheerfully respond to the gayety [sic] which pervades the film. ... It's the Gus Edwards repertoire of pop tunes which gives the film zest and the feeling that yesterday is worth remembering. 'School Days' is recreated in an elaborate production number, including an interpolation when Crosby, speaking directly from the screen to the film audience, invites and obtains a spirited if somewhat vocally uncertain choral participation."
