= Driftin' Thru =

1926 film

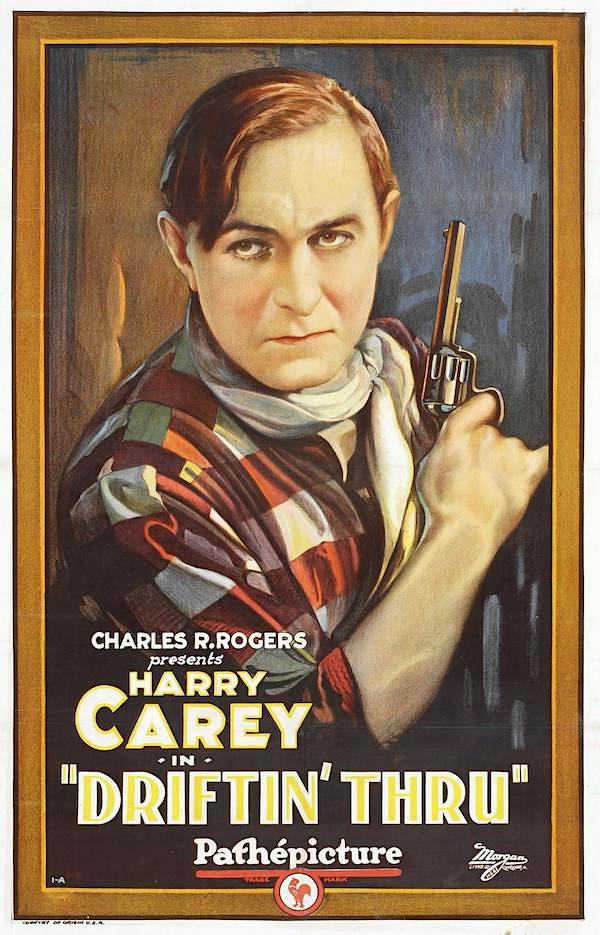
- Theatrical release poster
- Directed by: Scott R. Dunlap
- Written by: Basil Dickey; Harvey Gates; Harry Haven
- Starring: Harry Carey
- Cinematography: Sol Polito
- Distributed by: Pathé Exchange
- Release date: February 21, 1926
- Running time: 50 min.
- Country: United States
- Language: Silent (English intertitles)

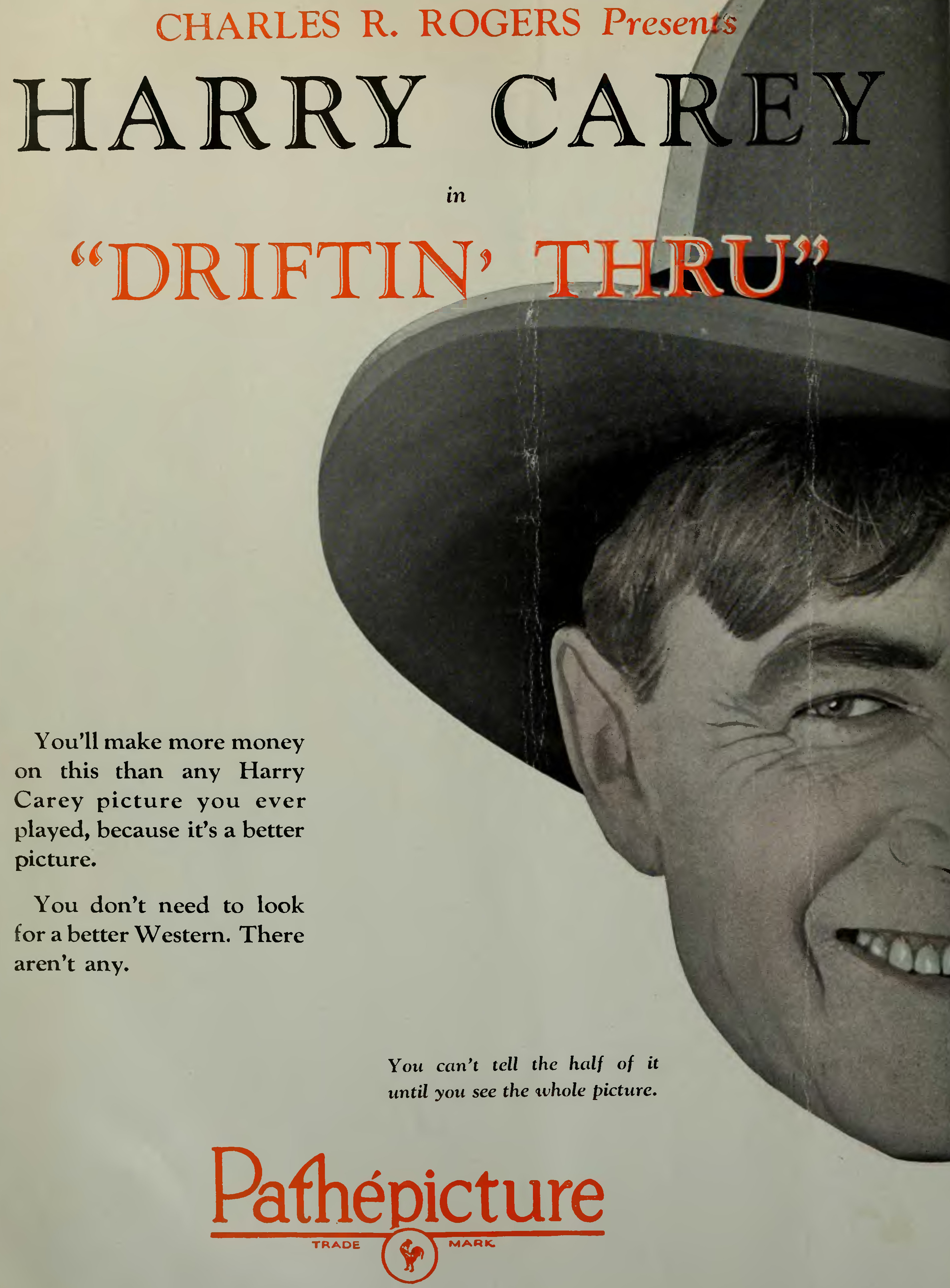
Driftin' Thru ad in The Film Daily, 1926

Driftin' Thru is a 1926 American silent Western film starring Harry Carey.

== Plot ==
As described in a film magazine review, Daniel Brown, a drifter, attempts to go to the aid of Stella, the wife of gambling den's owner Bull Dunn, finds himself framed with a murder charge when the wife shoots a gambler. Dan makes his escape with his donkey named Kentuck and boards a train where he is aided by a young woman who hides him in a Pullman stateroom. It turns out that the woman owns a ranch. Dan finds refuge with prospector Joshua Reynolds, who tells him that there is gold on the ranch property of the woman. Dan foils the scheme of the ranch foreman and Stella to rob the woman of her real property. The young woman then proves Dan innocent of the murder charge and marries him.

== Cast ==
- Harry Carey as Daniel Brown
- Stanton Heck as Bull Dunn
- Ruth King as Stella Dunn
- G. Raymond Nye as Joe Walters
- Joseph W. Girard as Sheriff (as Joseph Girard)
- Harriet Hammond as The Girl
- Bert Woodruff as Joshua Reynolds

== See also ==
- List of American films of 1926
- Harry Carey filmography
