= Charles R. Rogers =

American film producer

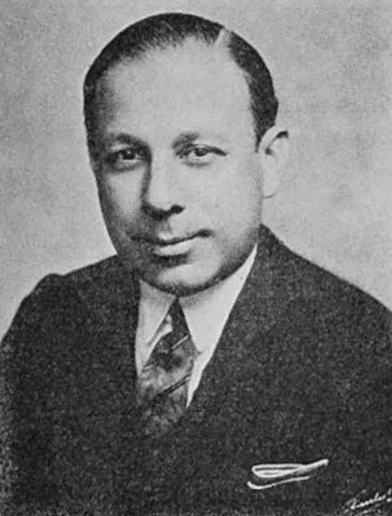
- Born: July 15, 1892; New York City, New York, United States
- Died: March 29, 1957 (aged 64); Hollywood, California, United States
- Occupation: Producer
- Years active: 1924–1947

Charles R. Rogers (July 15, 1892 – March 29, 1957), was an American film producer whose career spanned both the silent and sound film eras. Rogers began his career on the 1924 silent film, A Cafe in Cairo, produced by the short-lived Hunt Stromberg Productions. After Stromberg ceased productions in 1925, Rogers would found his own independent company, Charles R. Rogers Productions. He would also produce for major studios such as RKO Radio Pictures, Universal, and United Artists. The pinnacle of his career would be from 1936 to 1938 when he was chosen as the vice-president in charge of production for Universal Pictures. He died as the result of injuries sustained in a car accident in 1957.

== Personal life ==
Rogers was born in New York City on July 15, 1892, he had six siblings: three brothers and three sisters. He went to high school in Boston, before beginning in the film industry in Buffalo, New York, running the Star Theatre. He was married on June 17, 1913. In February 1957 Rogers was in a serious car accident in California. He remained in the hospital until March 29, when he would die due to his injuries.

== Career ==
In the early 1920s, he was a partner in the Burr-Rogers Producing Corporation, along with C.C. Burr. Rogers was in charge of handling the distribution of the pictures produced by Burr at his Glendale, Queens studio. In early 1924 he left the company to join Hunt Stromberg's independent film production company in 1924, after which the company changed its name to Burr Pictures, Inc. When Stromberg left to join the fledgling MGM Studios in 1925, Rogers would form his own eponymously named independent studio. His first film would be the successful western, Driftin' Thru, starring Harry Carey and released in early 1926. He would produce a series of four westerns starring Carey, which would be released through Pathé Exchange. The success of these films would lead to a deal to produce four independent films per year to be released through First National Pictures, starring Ken Maynard, and written by Marion Jackson.

=== First National, RKO and Paramount ===
Rogers deal with First National expired in 1929, after which he signed an agreement with RKO. When there was a management shake-up at the studio in the beginning of 1931, Rogers was named head of production for the studio in January of that year. His tenure at RKO would not last long, his last picture with that studio being 1932's Carnival Boat, which was released in March. It would not be long before he had signed a deal with Paramount Pictures to provide them with independent films through his own company. The first of those released would be 70,000 Witnesses in September 1932. While at the studio, his production unit would be housed in the historic Mary Pickford bungalow, which would be slated for demolition after his departure. He would make sixteen films for Paramount over the next four years, the last of which was released in September 1935, and was titled The Virginia Judge.

=== Universal years ===
In January 1935, rumors began to circulate that Carl Laemmle, the president of Universal, was considering offers for the sale of the studio. Apparently, these were nothing new. However, by the end of February, the rumors were still persisting, despite vehement denials by Laemmle; Warner Bros. also issued a denial that they were interested in buying the studio. Just two weeks later it was being reported that a sale of the studio had been consummated, however, once again Laemmle issued strident denials. By June it was confirmed that there had been several offers made, but they were declined due to Laemmle's insistence that key personnel at the studio be guaranteed to remain in their positions. In July 1935 it was reported that Rogers was acting as an intermediary on Warner Bros.' behalf in an attempt to purchase Universal. Although Laemmle acknowledged the offer, the latest of five such, Rogers denied that he was in any way involved, although it was reported that Rogers was promised a major position at the acquired studio if the negotiations were successful. On November 2 it was reported that Rogers, in conjunction with Standard Capital, had reached an agreement with Laemmle to provide financing for the studio, which included a three-month option to purchase Universal. As part of the deal, Laemmle received assurances that key personnel would be kept, as long as they had a proven track record. Rogers would be head of the new studio, but he could not assume that mantle immediately, since his commitment to Paramount still had two more films remaining on it. After a 6-week extension was granted on the option at the end of January, and control passed to Standard Capital on March 14, with Rogers being put in charge of production.

Shortly taking over control of the studio, Rogers announced that the unit system would remain in place, and that he was going to schedule 36 films for production during the 1936–37 production season; there would also be another eight western films starring Buck Jones, making a total of 44 films slated. The fourteen films still remaining on the Universal schedule for the 1935–36 season would also be completed as planned. This was almost a 33% increase over the prior year's production for the studio. In May Rogers was elected to Universal's board of directors. Roger's first production for Universal was 1936's My Man Godfrey, starring William Powell and Carole Lombard, which premiered on September 6, 1936, and was received quite favorably. The success of Godfrey, as well as several management decisions made by Rogers, led to Universal deciding to expand its 1937–38 production schedule to 52 features, including six westerns. Another accomplishment of Roger's during his tenure at Universal was the signing of teenage singer/actress Deanna Durbin. Her pictures, which usually did quite well at the box office, helped keep Universal profitable during the final years of 1930s.

In 1936 Rogers was named as a co-defendant in a lawsuit alleging copyright infringement. The case involved the 1933 film, Girl Without a Room, which Rogers produced for Paramount. The story had been sold to Paramount by Jack Lait, who, the suit alleged, was shown the story in 1929, and then subsequently submitted it as his own work. In January 1937, a judge dismissed the case against all the co-defendants, except for Lait. Also in January 1937 Rogers went on the record, condemning the Hollywood practice of pigeonholing films into "A" or "B" categories, based solely on their budgets. The following month, February, Rogers was elected as a vice-president of the Association of Motion Picture Producers, succeeding Joseph Schenck.

Despite his success at changing the failing studio around, rumors began to circulate in early 1937 that Rogers might be replaced at Universal. In May 1937 Universal's chairman, J. Cheever Cowdin, denied any such move was being contemplated, and praised Rogers for the way he had reorganized the film company. In September the Universal Board of Directors issued a resolution in support of the studio's management, including Rogers. November 1937 brought the revelation that Rogers had been attempting to secure additional financing for the studio. This was accomplished by replacing studio president Robert H. Cochrane with Nate J. Blumberg, who had been vice-president in charge of RKO theater operations. As part of the management shake-up, Rogers remained in charge of production. With Blumberg's arrival in January 1938, things began to change at the studio. During the course of meetings during the spring, Rogers began to feel his control over the production end of the studio was being undermined. In May, he requested a special meeting of the board of directors to discuss his authority over the production process. As a result of that meeting, Rogers was relieved of his duties as a Universal executive, approximately two years after assuming the position.

=== Post-Universal years ===
After his departure from Universal, Rogers and his wife took an extended vacation. Upon his return he began producing independent films again, his first being a biopic on the life of Gus Edwards. Titled The Star Maker, it stars Bing Crosby, and was produced for Paramount in 1939. He would produce only one other film during the next two years, 1939's Our Neighbors – The Carters, also for Paramount. In December 1939, Rogers was signed by Columbia to produce three pictures a year each of the next three years. However, terminated the contract in 1941, after having produced only two films for the studio. In September 1941 it was announced that he would co-produce the Broadway musical comedy, The Lady Comes Across. The play, starring Mischa Auer and Gower Champion, opened on January 9, 1942, at the 44th Street Theatre; however, it closed on January 11, after only three performances.

In December 1941 it was announced that Rogers had entered into a deal with United Artists, who would distribute his independent films. From 1943 through 1947 he would produce a film per year for the studio, including 1946's classic Angel on My Shoulder starring Paul Muni, Anne Baxter and Claude Rains. In 1944 Rogers signed a long-term agreement with United Artists to produce a further six films for the studio. In January 1945 Rogers announced that his productions for UA would increase from one to four films per year, with a budget of $5.25M for the four. However, he continued to produce at one film annually in 1946–47. After the release of The Fabulous Dorseys in 1947, starring Tommy and Jimmy Dorsey, Rogers was away from production for three years. In 1950 it was announced that he was returning to producing, with the film, The Son of Dr. Jekyll, which he was producing for Columbia. The film was released in October 1951, but the film did not include any producer credit. In 1957, Rogers produced a six-episode series of fifteen-minute shorts for television, entitled Men, Women and Clothes.
