= List of Tiffany Pictures films =

This is a list of films produced or distributed by the American studio Tiffany Pictures between 1922 and 1933. Tiffany was one of the dominant independent companies during the early studio era, and its releases were popular with audiences.

== 1920s ==
Title	Release date	Director	Notes
Peacock Alley	January 23, 1922	Robert Z. Leonard	Incomplete; Distributed by Metro Pictures
Fascination	April 10, 1922	Robert Z. Leonard	Lost Film; Distributed by Metro Pictures
Broadway Rose	September 25, 1922	Robert Z. Leonard	Extant; Distributed by Metro Pictures
The French Doll	September 3, 1923	Robert Z. Leonard	Extant; Distributed by Metro Pictures
Fashion Row	December 3, 1923	Robert Z. Leonard	Lost Film; Distributed by Metro Pictures
Jazzmania	February 12, 1923	Robert Z. Leonard	Extant; Distributed by Metro Pictures
Mademoiselle Midnight	April 14, 1924	Robert Z. Leonard	Extant; Distributed by Metro Pictures
Circe, the Enchantress	October 6, 1924	Robert Z. Leonard	Extant; Distributed by Metro-Goldwyn-Mayer
The Sporting Chance	June 21, 1925	Oscar Apfel	Lost Film
Souls for Sables	September 14, 1925	James C. McKay	Extant
Borrowed Finery	November 1, 1925	Oscar Apfel	Extant
Morals for Men	November 16, 1925	Bernard H. Hyman	Extant
Pleasures of the Rich	February 1, 1926	Louis J. Gasnier	Trailer Extant
Out of the Storm	April 10, 1926	Louis J. Gasnier	Lost Film
Morganson's Finish	May 5, 1926	Fred Windemere	Extant
The Lodge in the Wilderness	July 11, 1926	Henry McCarty	Extant
Lost at Sea	September 1, 1926	Louis J. Gasnier	Lost Film
Fools of Fashion	October 1, 1926	James C. McKay	Extant
College Days	October 15, 1926	Richard Thorpe	Extant
That Model from Paris	October 15, 1926	Louis J. Gasnier	Extant
Josselyn's Wife	November 15, 1926	Richard Thorpe	Incomplete
Sin Cargo	November 15, 1926	Louis J. Gasnier	Lost Film
Redheads Preferred	December 1, 1926	Allen Dale	Incomplete
The First Night	January 1, 1927	Richard Thorpe	Lost Film
One Hour of Love	January 15, 1927	Robert Florey	Extant
Husband Hunters	January 15, 1927	John G. Adolfi	Extant
Cheaters	February 1, 1927	Oscar Apfel	Lost Film
The Broken Gate	February 15, 1927	James C. McKay	Lost Film
The Princess from Hoboken	March 1, 1927	Allen Dale	Extant
The Enchanted Island	March 15, 1927	William G. Crosby	Lost Film
Backstage	April 1, 1927	Phil Goldstone	Extant
The Beauty Shoppers	April 15, 1927	Louis J. Gasnier	Extant
Snowbound	May 1, 1927	Phil Goldstone	Extant
The Tired Business Man	June 30, 1927	Allen Dale	Lost Film
Lightning	July 15, 1927	James C. McKay	Lost Film
The Girl from Gay Paree	September 15, 1927	Phil Goldstone	Extant
Women's Wares	October 1, 1927	Arthur Gregor	Extant
Once and Forever	October 15, 1927	Phil Goldstone	Incomplete; One Reel Missing
Night Life	November 11, 1927	George Archainbaud	Lost Film
Wild Geese	November 15, 1927	Phil Goldstone	Lost Film
The Haunted Ship	December 1, 1927	Forrest Sheldon	Lost Film
Streets of Shanghai	December 15, 1927	Louis J. Gasnier	Lost Film
A Woman Against the World	January 1, 1928	George Archainbaud	Lost Film
Clothes Make the Woman	January 4, 1928	Tom Terriss	Extant
The Devil's Skipper	February 1, 1928	John G. Adolfi	Extant
Nameless Men	February 12, 1928	Christy Cabanne	Lost Film
The Man in Hobbles	February 20, 1928	George Archainbaud	Extant
Their Hour	March 1, 1928	Alfred Raboch	Lost Film
The Tragedy of Youth	March 1, 1928	George Archainbaud	Lost Film
Bachelor's Paradise	March 15, 1928	George Archainbaud	Lost Film
The House of Scandal	April 1, 1928	King Baggot	Lost Film
The Scarlet Dove	April 15, 1928	Arthur Gregor	Extant
Ladies of the Night Club	May 15, 1928	George Archainbaud	Lost Film
Stormy Waters	June 1, 1928	Edgar Lewis	Lost Film
Green Grass Widows	June 10, 1928	Alfred Raboch	Extant
Prowlers of the Sea	June 20, 1928	John G. Adolfi	Extant
Lingerie	July 1, 1928	George Melford	Extant
Beautiful But Dumb	July 1, 1928	Elmer Clifton	Lost Film
The Grain of Dust	July 10, 1928	George Archainbaud	Lost Film
The Albany Night Boat	July 20, 1928	Alfred Raboch	Lost Film
Domestic Meddlers	August 15, 1928	James Flood	Lost Film
The Toilers	October 1, 1928	Reginald Barker	Synchronized; First Sound Tiffany Film; Extant
The Naughty Duchess	October 10, 1928	Tom Terriss	Lost Film
The Power of Silence	October 20, 1928	Wallace Worsley	Extant
The Cavalier	November 1, 1928	Irvin Willat	Synchronized; Extant
Marriage by Contract	November 9, 1928	James Flood	Part-Talkie; First Tiffany Film With Dialogue; Extant
The Floating College	November 10, 1928	George Crone	Lost Film
The Gun Runner	November 20, 1928	Edgar Lewis	Lost Film
Tropical Nights	December 10, 1928	Elmer Clifton	Extant
George Washington Cohen	December 20, 1928	George Archainbaud	Extant
Broadway Fever	January 1, 1929	Edward F. Cline	Incomplete
The Rainbow	February 1, 1929	Reginald Barker	Synchronized; Extant
Lucky Boy	February 2, 1929	Norman Taurog	Part-Talkie; Extant
The Spirit of Youth	February 15, 1929	Walter Lang	Extant
The Devil's Apple Tree	February 20, 1929	Elmer Clifton	Lost Film
Molly and Me	March 1, 1929	Albert Ray	Part-Talkie; Incomplete: Reel 7 Lost
My Lady's Past	April 1, 1929	Albert Ray	Part-Talkie; Extant
The Voice Within	April 15, 1929	George Archainbaud	Part-Talkie; Lost Film
Border Romance	May 25, 1929	Richard Thorpe	All-Talkie; First All-Talking Tiffany Film; Extant
New Orleans	June 2, 1929	Reginald Barker	Part-Talkie; Extant
Two Men and a Maid	June 10, 1929	George Archainbaud	Part-Talkie; Lost Film
Midstream	July 29, 1929	James Flood	Part-Talkie; Extant
The Wrecker	August 17, 1929	Géza von Bolváry	Part-Talkie; Co-produced with Gainsborough Pictures; Extant
Whispering Winds	September 5, 1929	James Flood	Part-Talkie; Lost Film
Mister Antonio	October 15, 1929	James Flood	All-Talkie; Extant
Woman to Woman	November 1, 1929	Victor Saville	All-Talkie; Co-produced with Gainsborough Pictures; Extant
Painted Faces	November 20, 1929	Albert S. Rogell	All-Talkie; Extant
The Lost Zeppelin	December 20, 1929	Edward Sloman	All-Talkie; Extant

== 1930s ==
All Films Are "All-Talking" From This Point

Title	Release date	Director	Notes
Party Girl	January 1, 1930	Victor Halperin	
Peacock Alley	January 10, 1930	Marcel de Sano	Technicolor Sequences
Troopers Three	February 23, 1930	Norman Taurog	Incomplete Silent Version Extant
Mamba	March 10, 1930	Albert S. Rogell	All Technicolor
High Treason	March 13, 1930	Albert S. Rogell	Co-produced with Gaumont Company
The Swellhead	March 20, 1930	James Flood	
Journey's End	April 14, 1930	James Whale	Co-produced with Gainsborough Pictures
Sunny Skies	May 18, 1930	Norman Taurog	
Near the Rainbow's End	June 10, 1930	J. P. McGowan	
Hot Curves	June 15, 1930	Norman Taurog	
The Medicine Man	June 15, 1930	Scott Pembroke	
Kathleen Mavourneen	June 20, 1930	Albert Ray	
Paradise Island	July 15, 1930	Bert Glennon	
Oklahoma Cyclone	August 8, 1930	John P. McCarthy	
The Thoroughbred	August 10, 1930	Richard Thorpe	
Wings of Adventure	August 10, 1930	Richard Thorpe	
Borrowed Wives	August 20, 1930	Frank R. Strayer	
Under Montana Skies	September 10, 1930	Richard Thorpe	
Near the Trail's End	September 20, 1930	Wallace Fox	
The Love Trader	September 25, 1930	Joseph Henabery	
Extravagance	October 10, 1930	Phil Rosen	
The Land of Missing Men	October 15, 1930	John P. McCarthy	
Just Like Heaven	October 22, 1930	Roy William Neill	
Headin' North	November 1, 1930	John P. McCarthy	
The Utah Kid	November 7, 1930	Richard Thorpe	
The Third Alarm	November 17, 1930	Emory Johnson	
She Got What She Wanted	December 18, 1930	James Cruze	Lost Film
Fighting Thru	December 25, 1930	William Nigh	
Command Performance	January 19, 1931	Walter Lang	
Caught Cheating	January 31, 1931	Frank R. Strayer	
The Sunrise Trail	February 7, 1931	John P. McCarthy	
The Single Sin	February 23, 1931	William Nigh	
The Drums of Jeopardy	March 2, 1931	George B. Seitz	
Aloha	April 15, 1931	Albert S. Rogell	
Hell Bound	May 1, 1931	Walter Lang	
Two Gun Man	May 15, 1931	Phil Rosen	
The Ridin' Fool	May 31, 1931	John P. McCarthy	
Salvation Nell	July 1, 1931	James Cruze	
Alias the Bad Man	July 15, 1931	Phil Rosen	
Women Go on Forever	August 15, 1931	Walter Lang	
Murder at Midnight	September 1, 1931	Frank R. Strayer	
Arizona Terror	September 13, 1931	Phil Rosen	
The Nevada Buckaroo	September 27, 1931	John P. McCarthy	
Near the Trail's End	September 30, 1931	Wallace Fox	
Branded Men	October 1, 1931	Phil Rosen	
Left Over Ladies	October 1, 1931	Erle C. Kenton	
Range Law	October 11, 1931	Phil Rosen	
Morals for Women	October 25, 1931	Mort Blumenstock	
The Pocatello Kid	December 6, 1931	Phil Rosen	
X Marks the Spot	December 13, 1931	Erle C. Kenton	
Sunset Trail	February 7, 1932	B. Reeves Eason	
Texas Gun Fighter	February 14, 1932	Phil Rosen	
Hell Fire Austin	March 3, 1932	Forrest Sheldon	
Hotel Continental	March 7, 1932	Christy Cabanne	
Whistlin' Dan	March 20, 1932	Phil Rosen	
Lena Rivers	March 28, 1932	Phil Rosen	
Strangers of the Evening	May 15, 1932	H. Bruce Humberstone	
The Man Called Back	July 15, 1932	Robert Florey	
The Death Kiss	December 5, 1932	Edwin L. Marin	

== See also ==
- List of Chesterfield Pictures films
- List of Monogram Pictures films
- List of Producers Releasing Corporation films
- List of Republic Pictures films

== Bibliography ==
- Michael R. Pitts. Poverty Row Studios, 1929-1940: An Illustrated History of 55 Independent Film Companies, with a Filmography for Each. McFarland & Company, 2005.
