= The Wagon Master =

1929 film

- Directed by: Harry Joe Brown
- Screenplay by: Marion Jackson and Leslie Mason
- Produced by: Ken Maynard Productions Inc.
- Starring: Ken Maynard
- Cinematography: Ted D. McCord
- Edited by: Fred Allen
- Production company: Universal Pictures
- Release date: September 8, 1929
- Running time: 70 minutes
- Country: United States
- Languages: Sound (Part-Talkie); English Intertitles

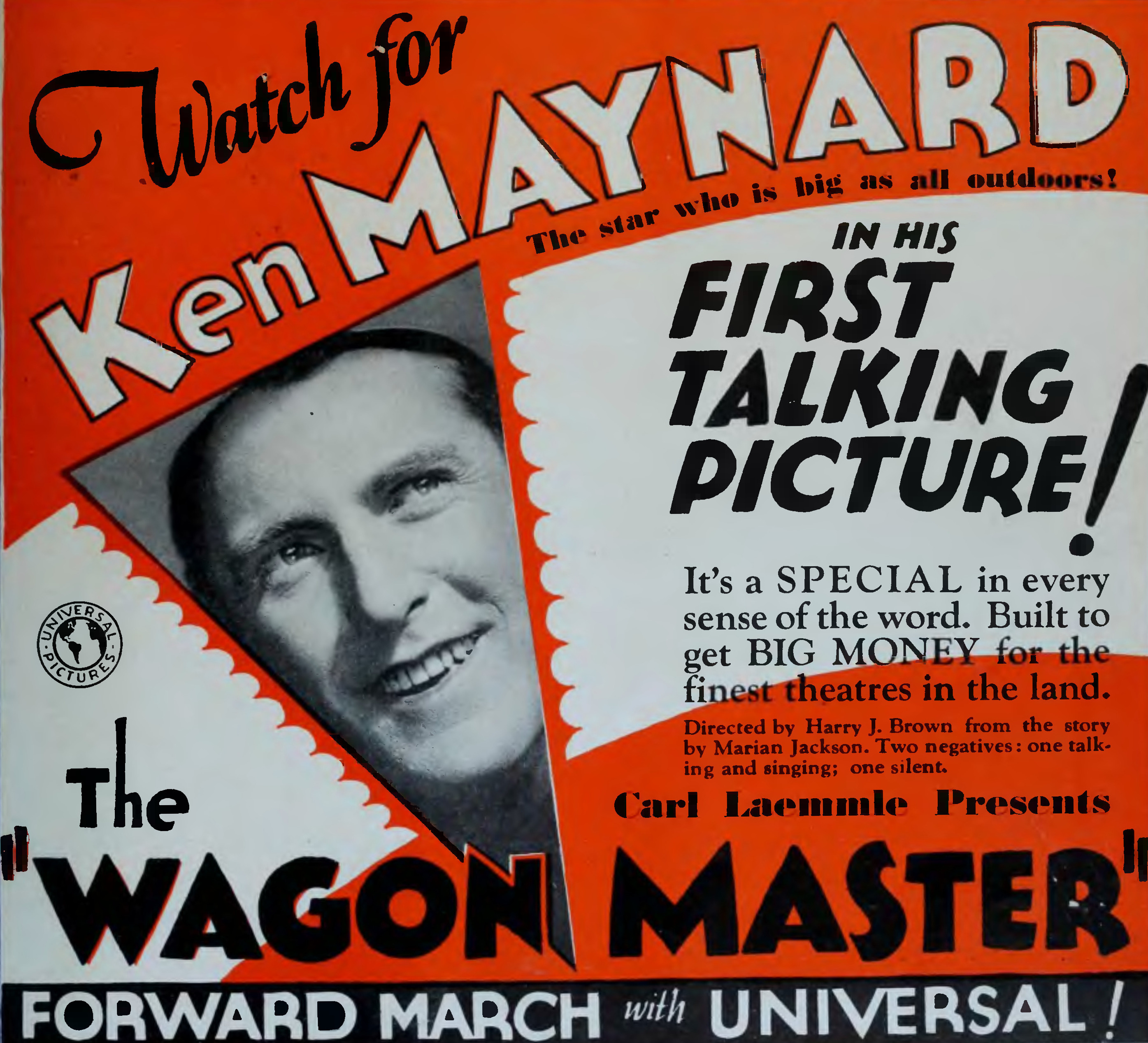
The Wagon Master ad in The Film Daily, 1929

The Wagon Master is a 1929 American sound part-talkie Western sound film starring Ken Maynard, directed by Harry Joe Brown, and written by Marion Jackson and Leslie Mason. In addition to sequences with audible dialogue or talking sequences, the film features a synchronized musical score and sound effects along with English intertitles. The soundtrack was recorded using the Western Electric sound-on-film system. The film was edited by Fred Allen and the cinematographer was Ted D. McCord. Maynard's character in the film was referred to as "the Rambler." There is a whip fight in this kinetic film. Maynard is believed to have been the first onscreen "Singing Cowboy" in this movie, succeeded by John Wayne as "Singin' Sandy" Saunders in Riders of Destiny (1933) and Gene Autry after Wayne eventually declined to flourish a dubbed singing voice in future endeavors; Autry "auditioned" for the mantle in the 1934 film In Old Santa Fe, starring Maynard.

== Cast ==
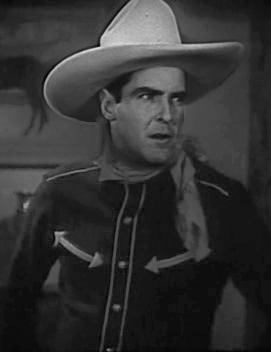
Ken Maynard

- Ken Maynard as The Rambler
- Edith Roberts as Sue Smith
- Tom Santschi as Jake Lynch
- Jack Hanlon as Billie Hollister
- Al Ferguson as Jacques Frazelle
- Bobby Dunn as Buckeye Pete
- Frank Rice as Grasshoper Jim

== See also ==
- List of early sound feature films (1926–1929)
