= The Fiddlin' Buckaroo =

1933 film

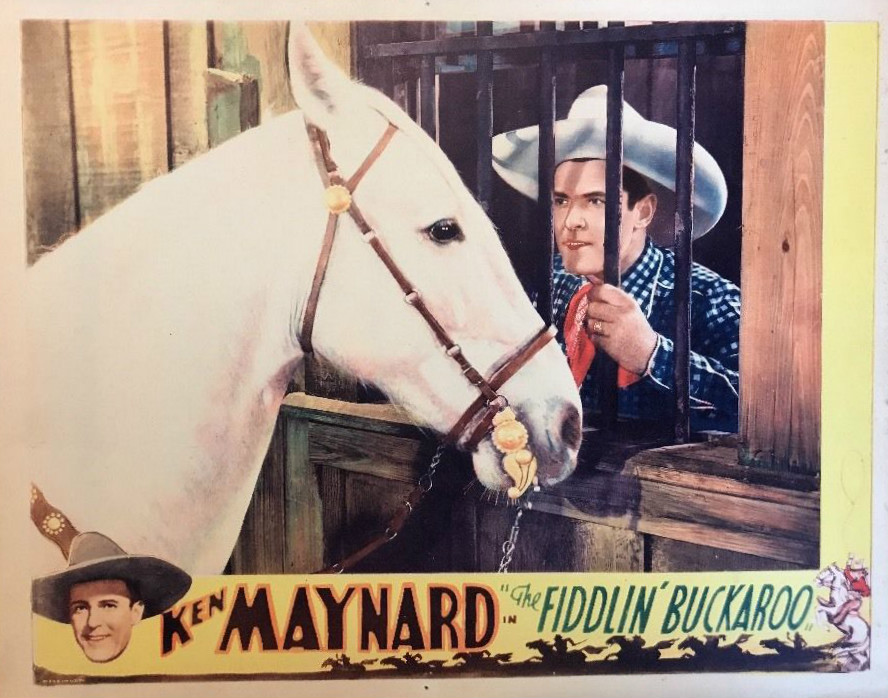
- Theatrical release poster
- Directed by: Ken Maynard
- Screenplay by: Nate Gatzert
- Story by: Nate Gatzert
- Produced by: Ken Maynard; Irving Starr
- Starring: Ken Maynard; Gloria Shea; Fred Kohler; Frank Rice; Jack Rockwell; Joseph W. Girard
- Cinematography: Ted D. McCord
- Edited by: Charles Harris
- Production company: Universal Pictures
- Distributed by: Universal Pictures
- Release date: July 20, 1933
- Running time: 65 minutes
- Country: United States
- Language: English

The Fiddlin' Buckaroo is a 1933 American Western film directed by Ken Maynard and written by Nate Gatzert. The film stars Ken Maynard, Gloria Shea, Fred Kohler, Frank Rice, Jack Rockwell and Joseph W. Girard. The film was released on July 20, 1933, by Universal Pictures.

== Cast ==
- Ken Maynard as Fiddlin'
- Gloria Shea as Ann Kerriman
- Fred Kohler as Wolf Morgan
- Frank Rice as Banty
- Jack Rockwell as Sheriff
- Joseph W. Girard as Kerriman
- Billy Franey as Postmaster Dan
- Slim Whitaker as Henchman Swede
- Jack Mower as Ranch hand Buck
- Robert McKenzie as Jerry
- George Sowards as Deputy George
- Len Sowards as Deputy
- Tarzan as Tarzan
