= Mountain Justice (1930 film) =

1930 film

- Directed by: Harry Joe Brown
- Screenplay by: Bennett Cohen; Leslie Mason
- Story by: Bennett Cohen
- Produced by: Ken Maynard
- Starring: Ken Maynard; Otis Harlan; Kathryn Crawford; Paul Hurst; Les Bates; Richard Carlyle
- Cinematography: Ted D. McCord
- Edited by: Fred Allen
- Production company: Ken Maynard Productions Inc.
- Distributed by: Universal Pictures
- Release date: May 4, 1930
- Running time: 74 minutes
- Country: United States
- Language: English

Mountain Justice is a 1930 American pre-Code Western film directed by Harry Joe Brown and written by Bennett Cohen and Leslie Mason. The film stars Ken Maynard, Otis Harlan, Kathryn Crawford, Paul Hurst, Les Bates and Richard Carlyle. The film was released on May 4, 1930, by Universal Pictures.

== Cast ==
- Ken Maynard as Ken McTavish
- Otis Harlan as Jud McTavish
- Kathryn Crawford as Coral Harland
- Paul Hurst as Lem Harland
- Les Bates as Abner Harland
- Richard Carlyle as Judge Keats
- Gilbert Holmes as Rusty
- Len Nash as Band Leader
