= Gun Justice =

1933 film

- Theatrical release poster
- Directed by: Alan James
- Screenplay by: Robert Quigley
- Produced by: Ken Maynard
- Starring: Ken Maynard; Cecilia Parker; Hooper Atchley; Walter Miller; William Gould; Jack Rockwell
- Cinematography: Ted D. McCord
- Edited by: Charles Harris
- Production company: Universal Pictures
- Distributed by: Universal Pictures
- Release date: December 11, 1933
- Running time: 59 minutes
- Country: United States
- Language: English

Gun Justice is a 1933 American Western film directed by Alan James and written by Robert Quigley. The film stars Ken Maynard, Cecilia Parker, Hooper Atchley, Walter Miller, William Gould and Jack Rockwell. The film was released on December 11, 1933, by Universal Pictures.

== Cast ==
- Ken Maynard as Ken Lance
- Cecilia Parker as Ray Marsh
- Hooper Atchley as Sam Burkett
- Walter Miller as Chris Hogan
- William Gould as Jones
- Jack Rockwell as Hank Rivers
- Sheldon Lewis as Lawyer Hawkins
- Ed Brady as Denver
- Fred MacKaye as Ken Lance imposter
- William Dyer as Red Hogan
- Jack Richardson as Sheriff
- Edward Coxen as Jim Lance
- Lafe McKee as Postmaster
- Tarzan as Tarzan
