= Song of the Caballero =

1930 film

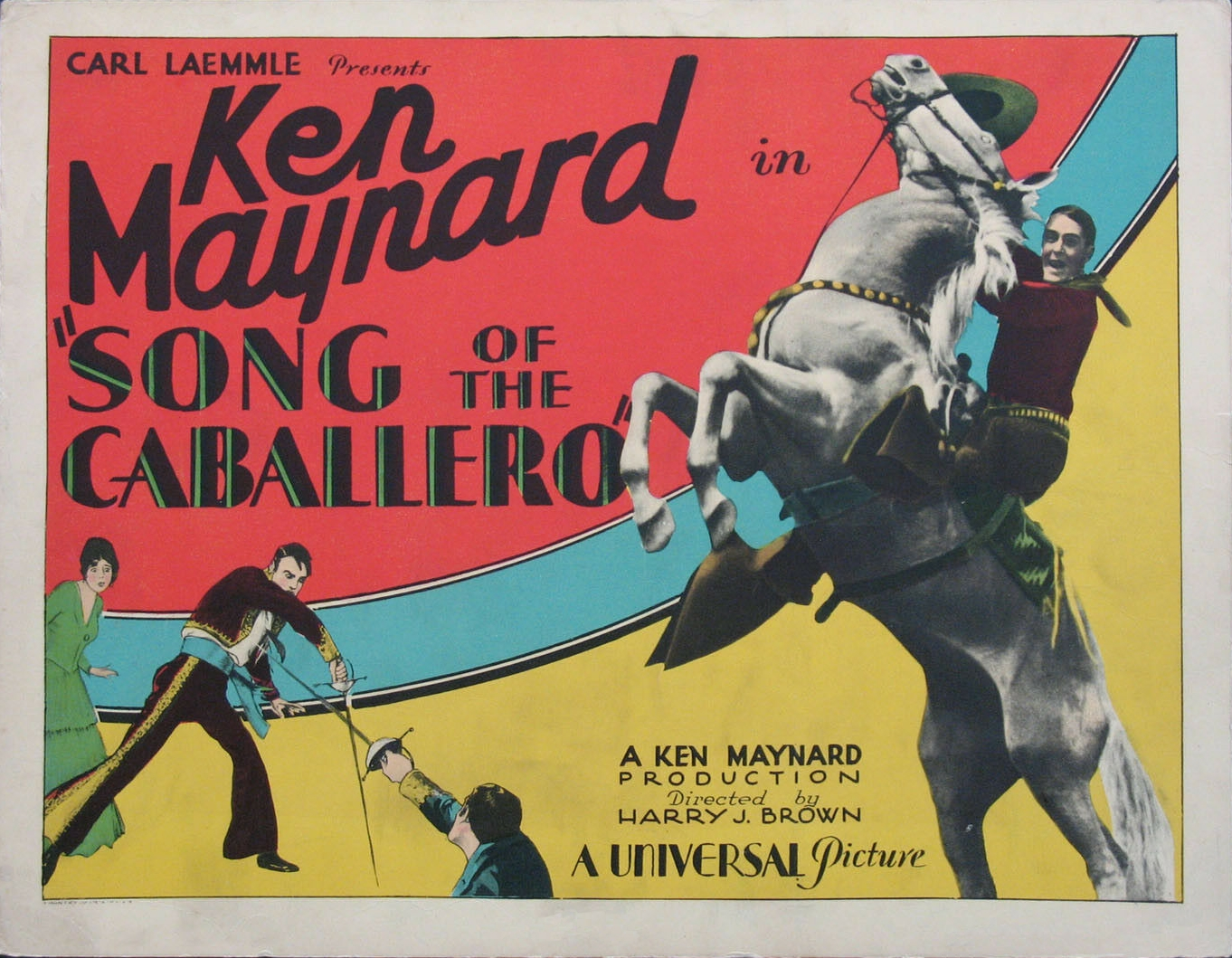
- Lobby card
- Directed by: Harry Joe Brown
- Screenplay by: Bennett Cohen; Leslie Mason
- Story by: Kenneth C. Beaton; Norman L. Sper
- Produced by: Ken Maynard
- Starring: Ken Maynard
- Cinematography: Ted D. McCord
- Edited by: Fred Allen
- Music by: Sam Perry
- Production company: Ken Maynard Productions Inc.
- Distributed by: Universal Pictures
- Release date: June 29, 1930
- Running time: 73 minutes
- Country: United States
- Language: English

Song of the Caballero is a 1930 pre-Code American Western film directed by Harry Joe Brown and written by Bennett Cohen and Leslie Mason. The film stars Ken Maynard. The film was released on June 29, 1930, by Universal Pictures.

== Plot ==
Maynard appears in the role of a drifter who comes home to revenge harm done to his mother. In the process he encounters 10 villains with swords. Maynard also sings in this film.

== Cast ==
- Ken Maynard as Juan Posing as El Lobo
- Doris Hill as Anita
- Francis Ford as Don Pedro Madero
- Gino Corrado as Don Jose Madero
- Evelyn Sherman as Doña Louisa
- Josef Swickard as Manuel
- Frank Rice as Andrea
- William Irving as Bernardo
- Joyzelle Joyner as Conchita
- Tarzan as Tarzan
