= The Trail Drive =

- Theatrical release poster
- Directed by: Alan James
- Screenplay by: Alan James; Nate Gatzert
- Produced by: Ken Maynard
- Starring: Ken Maynard; Cecilia Parker; William Gould; Frank Rice; Bob Kortman; Fern Emmett
- Cinematography: Ted McCord
- Edited by: Charles Harris
- Production company: Ken Maynard Productions Inc.
- Distributed by: Universal Pictures
- Release date: September 4, 1933
- Running time: 60 minutes
- Country: United States
- Language: English

The Trail Drive is a 1933 American Western film directed by Alan James and written by Alan James and Nate Gatzert. The film stars Ken Maynard, Cecilia Parker, William Gould, Frank Rice, Bob Kortman and Fern Emmett. The film was released on September 4, 1933, by Universal Pictures.

== Cast ==
- Ken Maynard as Ken Benton
- Cecilia Parker as Virginia
- William Gould as Honest John
- Frank Rice as Thirsty
- Bob Kortman as Blake
- Fern Emmett as Aunt Martha
- Jack Rockwell as The Marshal
- Lafe McKee as Jameson
