= Range Law =

Range Law may refer to:

- Range Law (1931 film), an American pre-Code Western film
- Range Law (1944 film), an American Western film
