= Alias – the Bad Man =

1931 film directed by Phil Rosen

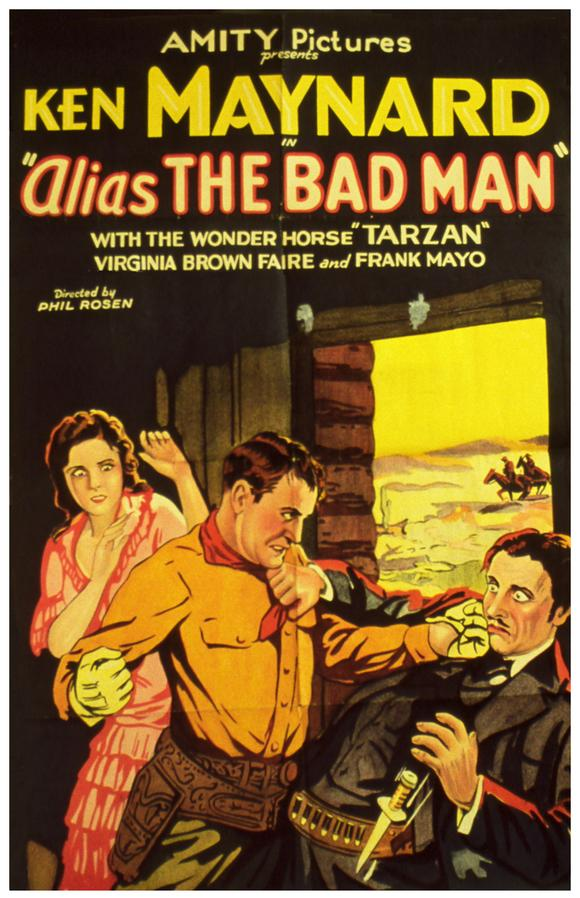
- Theatrical release poster
- Directed by: Phil Rosen
- Written by: Ford Bebee
- Produced by: Phil Goldstone
- Starring: Ken Maynard; Virginia Brown Faire; Frank Mayo
- Cinematography: Arthur Reed
- Edited by: Martin G. Cohn
- Production company: Tiffany Productions
- Release date: July 15, 1931 (US)
- Running time: 66 minutes
- Country: United States
- Language: English

Alias – the Bad Man, also known as Alias Bad Man, is a 1931 American pre-Code Western film, directed by Phil Rosen and starring Ken Maynard, Virginia Brown Faire, and Frank Mayo. It was released on July 15, 1931.

== Plot ==
Clem Neville and fellow rancher Warner are being plagued by a group of rustlers. He sends for his son, Ken, to come help him round up the criminals. However, when Ken arrives he finds out that his father and Warner have been killed. He does not reveal his identity to any of the townspeople, and Warner's daughter, Mary, suspects him of being one of the rustlers. As they verbally spar, Ken learns that Mary had known of a plan of Clem and her father to trap the rustlers. The only person she shared the information with was Rance Collins. He meets up with an old friend Ranger Simpson, known by the nickname of "Repeater", who he lets know what he is attempting to do.

Suspecting that Rance must be involved, Ken learns who some of his associates are. He follows one back to the gang's hideout, and after overhearing of their plans to finish rustling Warner's cattle, steps into the room and asks for a job. Collins is skeptical, but then Repeater shows up and, as set up before by him and Ken, arrests Ken for Clem's murder. Collins suspicions of Ken are alleviated, and he and some of his men ride after the two. They help Ken escape, during which Ken makes it appear as if Repeater has been killed. However, once back at the hideout, suspicions once again begin to arise. Finally, one of the rustlers returns to the hideout and recognizes Ken from Warner's ranch earlier that day. Surrounded by the gang, Ken's horse, Tarzan comes to his rescue and breaks a window allowing him to escape.

Collins henchmen take off after Ken, while Collins remains behind to continue planning their rustling activities. Ken eludes the gang and doubles back to the hideout. He delays Collins long enough for Repeater to arrive with the sheriff to arrest Collins. Afterwards, Mary apologizes to Ken for jumping to conclusions, and Ken decides to stay on in town and run his father's ranch.

== Cast ==
- Ken Maynard as Ken Neville
- Virginia Brown Faire as Mary Warner
- Frank Mayo as Rance Collins
- Charles King as Black
- Robert Homans as Mr. Warner
- Irving Bacon as Ranger Simpson
- Lafe McKee as Clem Neville

== Production ==
In early April it was announced that one of Maynard's upcoming pictures would be titled, The Bad Man. By the middle of the month, the film had become known as Alias The Bad Man, the third of a series of eight films Maynard was slated to do for Tiffany Productions. On April 18, it was reported that Maynard had wrapped on his prior film, Two Gun Man, and that production on Alias the Bad Man would begin in the near future. The picture began filming the week of May 16, with production complete by the first week in June. The film was released on July 15, 1931.

== Reception ==
The Film Daily gave the film a positive review, lauding the direction, story and cinematography. They also highlighted the acting work of Ken Maynard and Virginia Brown Faire. "The story is above the average western opus material, having an intelligent plot, with plenty of surprises and twists to keep the suspense always at a fever heat." Harrison's Reports said, "A good Western. The story is interesting and there is plenty of action and suspense. Some of the situations will hold the spectator breathless...."
