= The Pocatello Kid =

1931 film directed by Phil Rosen

- Directed by: Phil Rosen
- Screenplay by: Earle Snell
- Story by: W. Scott Darling
- Produced by: Phil Goldstone
- Starring: Ken Maynard
- Cinematography: Arthur Reed
- Edited by: S. Roy Luby
- Production company: Tiffany Productions
- Release date: December 6, 1931 (US)
- Running time: 61 minutes
- Country: United States
- Language: English

The Pocatello Kid is a 1931 pre-Code American Western film, directed by Phil Rosen. It stars Ken Maynard and was released on December 6, 1931.

== Plot ==
Outlaw Pete Larkin shoots his crooked sheriff during a card-game dispute, then disguises the dying body of the Pocatello Kid in the sheriff's clothes so the Kid will take his murdered brother's place as lawman. The Kid recovers from his wounds with no memory of what happened and is told he killed his own brother in self-defense. Mary, the sheriff's reluctant fiancée, softens toward him as he genuinely commits to cleaning up the range, while Larkin pressures him to keep covering for the gang's rustling. When the Kid uncovers the truth about his brother and the rustling, he rounds up Larkin's gang and earns a governor's pardon along with Mary.

== Cast ==
- Ken Maynard as the Pocatello Kid, a.k.a. Jim Bledsoe
- Marceline Day as Mary
- Richard Cramer as Pete Larkin
- Charles King as Trinidad
- Lew Meehan as Blaze
- Tarzan, the Wonder Horse as Pocatello's horse
