= Sons of the Saddle =

1930 film

- Theatrical release poster
- Directed by: Harry Joe Brown
- Screenplay by: Bennett Cohen; Leslie Mason
- Story by: Bennett Cohen
- Produced by: Ken Maynard
- Starring: Ken Maynard
- Cinematography: Ted D. McCord
- Edited by: Fred Allen
- Production company: Ken Maynard Productions Inc.
- Distributed by: Universal Pictures
- Release date: August 3, 1930
- Running time: 76 minutes
- Country: United States
- Language: English

Sons of the Saddle is a 1930 pre-Code American Western film directed by Harry Joe Brown, written by Bennett Cohen and Leslie Mason, and starring Ken Maynard. It was released on August 3, 1930, by Universal Pictures.

== Plot ==
Maynard portrays a ranch foreman who fights a gang of outlaws. He also sings several songs, including "Down the Home Trail with You", which "became a minor hit" as a recording.

== Cast ==
- Ken Maynard as Jim Brandon
- Doris Hill as Veronica 'Ronnie' Stavnow
- Joseph W. Girard as Martin Stavnow
- Carroll Nye as Harvey
- Francis Ford as 'Red' Slade
- Harry Todd as 'Pop' Higgins
- Tarzan as Tarzan

== Production ==
In addition to Brown as director and Cohen and Mason as screenwriters, Fred Allen was the editor, Ted D. McCord was the cinematographer, and Maynard was the producer.
