= Near the Trail's End =

1931 film

- Directed by: Wallace Fox
- Screenplay by: George Arthur Durlam
- Story by: Robert Quigley
- Produced by: Trem Carr
- Starring: Bob Steele; Marion Shockley; Jay Morley; Si Jenks; Hooper Atchley; Murdock MacQuarrie
- Cinematography: Archie Stout
- Edited by: Leonard Wheeler
- Production company: Tiffany Pictures
- Distributed by: Tiffany Pictures
- Release date: September 30, 1931
- Running time: 53 minutes
- Country: United States
- Language: English

Near the Trail's End is a 1931 American Western film directed by Wallace Fox and written by George Arthur Durlam. The film stars Bob Steele, Marion Shockley, Jay Morley, Si Jenks, Hooper Atchley and Murdock MacQuarrie. The film was released on September 30, 1931, by Tiffany Pictures.

== Cast ==
- Bob Steele as Marshal Johnny Day
- Marion Shockley as Jane Rankin
- Jay Morley as Red Thompson
- Si Jenks as Texas
- Hooper Atchley as Bart Morgan
- Murdock MacQuarrie as Dan Cather
- Henry Roquemore as Mayor 'Cash' Watkins
