= The Fighting Legion =

1930 film

- Theatrical release poster
- Directed by: Harry Joe Brown
- Screenplay by: Bennett Cohen; Leslie Mason
- Story by: Bennett Cohen
- Produced by: Ken Maynard
- Starring: Ken Maynard; Dorothy Dwan; Harry Todd; Frank Rice; Ernie Adams; Stanley Blystone
- Cinematography: Ted D. McCord
- Edited by: Fred Allen
- Production company: Ken Maynard Productions Inc.
- Distributed by: Universal Pictures
- Release date: April 6, 1930
- Running time: 74 minutes
- Country: United States
- Languages: Sound film (Part-Talkie); English Intertitles

The Fighting Legion is a 1930 American pre-Code part-talkie sound film Western film directed by Harry Joe Brown and written by Bennett Cohen and Leslie Mason. While the film has a few talking sequences, the majority of the film featured a synchronized musical score with sound effects. The film stars Ken Maynard, Dorothy Dwan, Harry Todd, Frank Rice, Ernie Adams, and Stanley Blystone. The film was released on April 6, 1930, by Universal Pictures.

== Plot ==
After being shot, dying Ranger Tom Dawson gives Dave Hayes his badge. When Dave Hayes arrives at Bowden to turn in the badge, he is mistaken as a Ranger. Suspicious of him, Blake and Bowle tries to put the shooting of Ranger Dawson on Dave Hayes. After fighting the gang led by Blake, Dave Hayes saves Molly and gets sworn in as a Texas Ranger.

== Cast ==
- Ken Maynard as Dave Hayes
- Dorothy Dwan as Molly Williams
- Harry Todd as Dad Williams
- Frank Rice as Cloudy Jones
- Ernie Adams as Jack Bowie
- Stanley Blystone as Burl Edwards
- J.C. Fowler as John Blake
- Robert Walker as Ranger Tom Dawson
- Les Bates as Red Hook
- Slim Whitaker as Fred Hook
- Bill Nestell as Ed Hook

== Production ==
The Fighting Legion was partially filmed on location at Lone Pine, California.
