= Ken Maynard =

American actor (1895–1973)

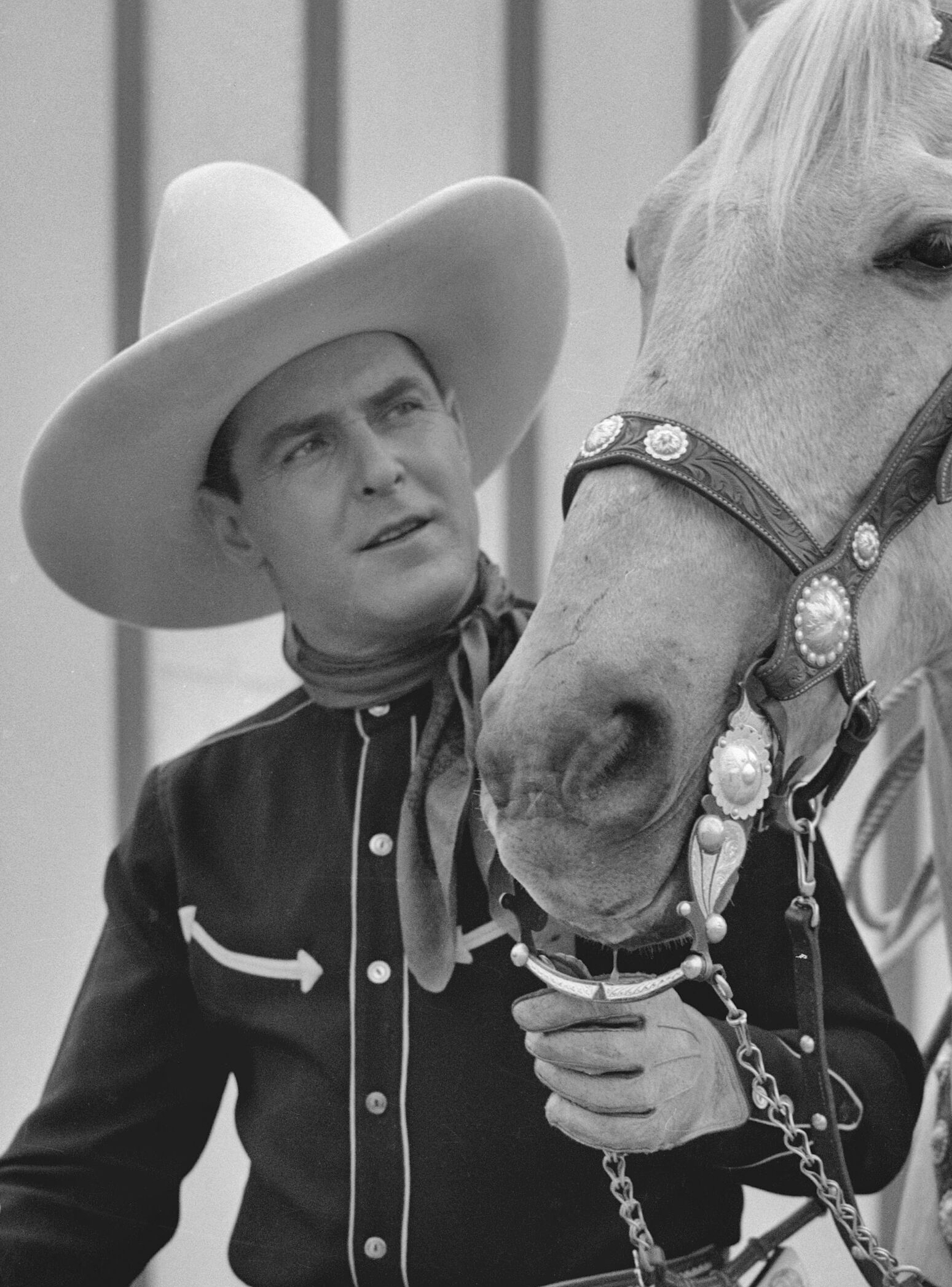
- Maynard with his horse Tarzan (1936)
- Born: Kenneth Olin Maynard; July 21, 1895; Vevay, Indiana, U.S.
- Died: March 23, 1973 (aged 77); Woodland Hills, Los Angeles, California, U.S.
- Resting place: Forest Lawn, Cypress, California, U.S.
- Occupations: Actor, producer
- Years active: 1923–1972
- Spouse(s): Mary Leeper Maynard (m. 1926–1939); Bertha Maynard (m. 1940–1968)
- Relatives: Kermit Maynard (brother)

Kenneth Olin Maynard (July 21, 1895 – March 23, 1973) was an American actor and producer. He was mostly active from the 1920s to the ‘40s and considered one of the biggest Western stars in Hollywood.

Maynard was also an occasional screenwriter and director. In 1960, he was honored with a star on the Hollywood Walk of Fame for his contributions to the film industry.

== Biography ==
Maynard was born in Vevay, Indiana, United States, one of five children, another of whom, his lookalike younger brother, Kermit, would also become an actor; most audience members assumed that Kermit was his brother's identical twin. Ken Maynard began working at carnivals and circuses, where he became an accomplished horseman. As a young man, he performed in rodeos and was a trick rider with Wild West Show.

Maynard served in the United States Army during World War I. After the war, Maynard returned to show business as a circus rider with Ringling Brothers. When the circus was playing in Los Angeles, California, actor Buck Jones encouraged Maynard to try working in the movies. Maynard soon had a contract with Fox Studios.

He first appeared in silent motion pictures in 1923 as a stuntman or supporting actor. In 1924, he began working in Western features, where his horsemanship and rugged good looks made him a cowboy star. Maynard's silent features showcased his daredevil riding, photographed fairly close so audiences could see that Maynard was doing his own stunts with his white stallion Tarzan. The action scenes were so spectacular that they were often reused in films of the 1930s, starring either Maynard himself, John Wayne, or Dick Foran. (Wayne, and later Foran, starred in Westerns for Warner Bros. and were costumed like Maynard to match the old footage.)

Maynard made a successful transition to talking pictures and became the movies' first singing cowboy in 1929 talkie hit from Universal picture The Wagon Master, where he sang both "The Cowboy's Lament" and "The Lone Star Trail". He recorded eight songs for Columbia Records. "The Cowboy's Lament" (Columbia 2310-D 149832 and "The Lone Star Trail" (Columbia 2310=D 149833) became the only issued records. Ken Maynard donated the eight one-sided pressings of his 4/14/1930 recording session with Columbia Records to the John Edwards Memorial Foundation.

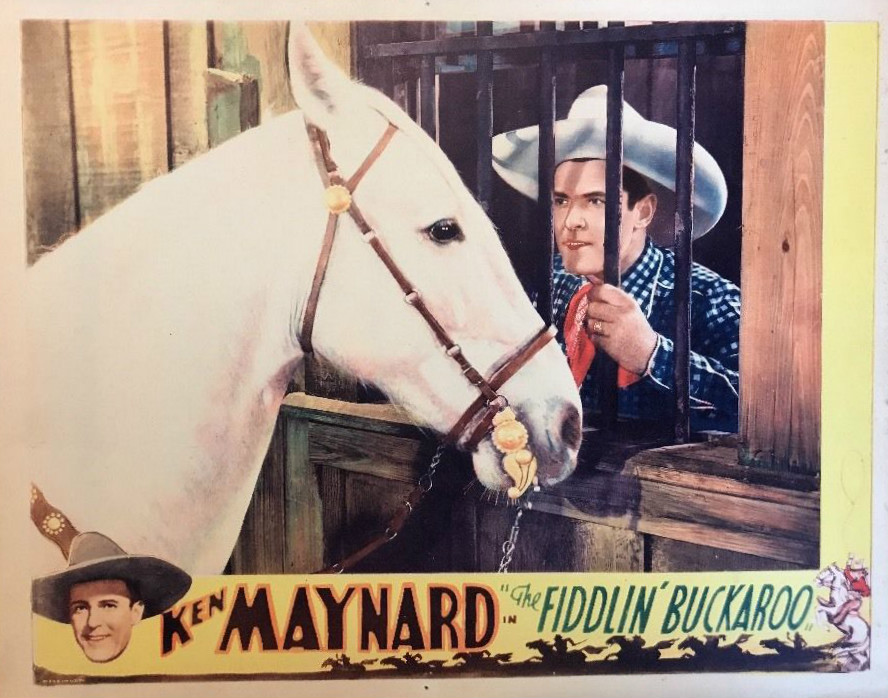
Maynard and Tarzan in The Fiddlin' Buckaroo, 1933

Maynard's first talkies were made for Universal Pictures. His reckless screen personality spilled over into his private life, with alcoholism and high living resulting in production delays and temper tantrums on the set. This made Maynard a problem employee, and he was released from Universal after one year. Other independent producers took a chance on the hotheaded star—among them Tiffany Productions and Sono Art-World Wide Pictures—before he returned to Universal in 1933. Maynard played several musical instruments, and was featured that year on the fiddle in The Fiddlin' Buckaroo, and on the banjo in The Trail Drive. Author James Horwitz has recounted the end of Maynard's tenure at Universal; when studio head Carl Laemmle asked Maynard why his latest production was such a very bad picture, the frustrated Maynard retorted, "Mr. Laemmle, I have made you eight very bad pictures," and walked out on Laemmle and Universal.

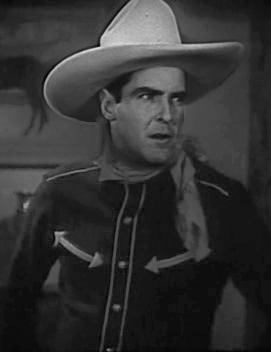
Maynard in In Old Santa Fe (1934)

In 1934, producer Nat Levine hired Ken Maynard for a serial, Mystery Mountain, and planned to make a series of Western features with Maynard, beginning with In Old Santa Fe. Maynard's unprofessionalism cost him the job; after In Old Santa Fe, Levine replaced Maynard with a singer in his supporting cast, Gene Autry. Maynard kept working in Hollywood, but in smaller productions, until 1940.

He returned to the screen in 1943 for low-budget Monogram Pictures in a new series called The Trail Blazers. He was teamed with fellow veteran stars Hoot Gibson and Bob Steele, and the trio offered action for the kids and nostalgia for their elders. soon, Maynard's raging temperament again cost him the job; he liked Gibson but did not like Steele, and he left the series after seven films. One final film, Harmony Trail, was made by independent producer Walt Mattox in 1944; just as one of Maynard's films had introduced cowboy star Gene Autry, this final Maynard film introduced the new singing cowboy Eddie Dean.

Maynard turned his back on the movies and made appearances at state fairs and rodeos. He owned a small circus operation featuring rodeo riders, but eventually lost it to creditors. His substantial wealth had vanished, and he lived a desolate life as an alcoholic in a rundown trailer. During these years, Maynard was supported by an unknown benefactor, long thought to be Gene Autry. More than 25 years after his last starring role, Maynard returned to the screen in two small roles in Bigfoot (1970) and The Marshal of Windy Hollow (filmed in 1972, but never released).

== Death ==
Maynard died of stomach cancer in 1973 at the Motion Picture Home in Woodland Hills, California. He was interred at Forest Lawn Cypress Cemetery, in Cypress, California. Maynard's funeral is described in detail in James Horwitz's book They Went Thataway.

For his contribution to the motion picture industry, Ken Maynard has a star on the Hollywood Walk of Fame at 6751 Hollywood Blvd.

== Filmography ==
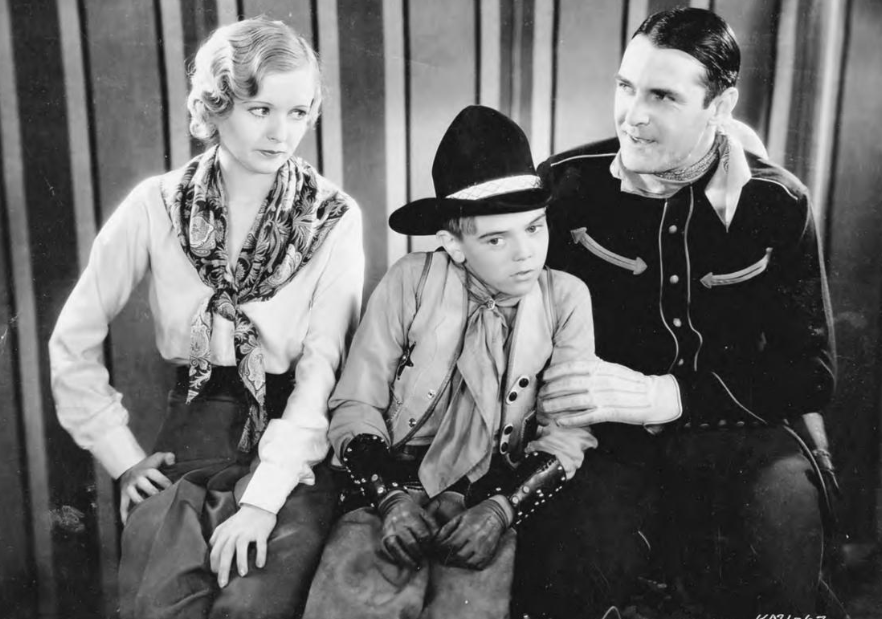
Maynard (right) with Lucille Browne and Bobby Nelson in King of the Arena, 1933

- Brass Commandments (1923) (uncredited)
- The Man Who Won (1923) as Conroy
- The Gunfighter (1923) (uncredited)
- Cameo Kirby (1923) (uncredited)
- Janice Meredith (1924) as Paul Revere
- $50,000 Reward (1924) as Tex Sherwood
- The Demon Rider (1925) as Billy Dennis
- North Star (1925) as Noel Blake
- Fighting Courage (1925) as Richard Kingsley
- Haunted Range (1926) as Terry Bladwin
- The Grey Vulture (1926) as Bart Miller / Sir Arthur
- Senor Daredevil (1926) as Don Luis O'Flaherty
- The Unknown Cavalier (1926) as Tom Drury
- The Overland Stage (1927) as Jack Jessop
- Somewhere in Sonora (1927) as Bob Bishop
- The Land Beyond the Law (1927) as Jerry Steele
- The Devil's Saddle (1927) as Harry Morrel
- The Red Raiders (1927) as Lt. John Scott
- Gun Gospel (1927) as Granger Hume
- The Wagon Show (1928) as Bob Mason
- The Canyon of Adventure (1928) as Steven Bancroft
- The Upland Rider (1928) as Dan Dailey
- The Code of the Scarlet (1928) as Bruce Kenton
- The Glorious Trail (1928) as Pat O'Leary
- The Phantom City (1928) as Tim Kelly
- Cheyenne (1929) as Cal Roberts
- The Lawless Legion (1929) as Cal Stanley
- The Royal Rider (1929) as Dick Scott
- The California Mail (1929) as Bob Scott
- The Wagon Master (1929) as The Rambler
- Senor Americano (1929) as Lieutenant Michael Banning
- Parade of the West (1930) as Bud Rand
- Lucky Larkin (1930) as 'Lucky' Larkin
- The Fighting Legion (1930) as Dave Hayes
- Mountain Justice (1930) as Ken McTavish
- Song of the Caballero (1930) as Juan posing as El Lobo
- Sons of the Saddle (1930) as Jim Brandon
- Fighting Thru; or, California in 1878 (1930) as Dan Barton
- Two Gun Man (1931) as Blackie Weld
- Alias – the Bad Man (1931) as Ranger Ken Neville
- Arizona Terror (1931) as The Arizonian
- Range Law (1931) as Hap Conners
- Branded Men (1931) as Rod Whitaker
- The Pocatello Kid (1931) as Sheriff Jim Bledsoe
- The Sunset Trail (1932) as Jim Brandon
- Texas Gun Fighter (1932) as Bill Dame
- Come On, Tarzan (1932) as Ken Benson
- Hell Fire Austin (1932) as Ken 'Hell Fire' Austin
- Whistlin' Dan (1932) as Whistlin' Dan Savage
- Dynamite Ranch (1932) as Blaze Howell
- False Faces (1932) as Himself - in Nightclub (uncredited)
- Between Fighting Men (1932) as Ken
- Tombstone Canyon (1932) as Ken
- Drum Taps (1933) as Ken Cartwright
- Phantom Thunderbolt (1933) as Thunderbolt Kid
- The Lone Avenger (1933) as Cal Weston
- King of the Arena (1933) as Captain Ken Keaton
- The Fiddlin' Buckaroo (1933) as Fiddlin'
- The Trail Drive (1933) as Ken Benton
- Strawberry Roan (1933) as Ken Masters
- Fargo Express (1933) as Ken Benton
- Gun Justice (1933) as Ken Lance
- Wheels of Destiny (1934) as Ken Manning
- Honor of the Range (1934) as Sheriff Ken Bellany
- Smoking Guns (1934) as Ken Masters
- In Old Santa Fe (1934) as Ken a.k.a. Kentucky
- Mystery Mountain (1934, Serial) as Ken Williams
- Western Frontier (1935) as Ken Masters
- Heir to Trouble (1935) as Ken Armstrong
- Western Courage (1935) as Ken Baxter
- Lawless Riders (1935) as Ken Manley
- Heroes of the Range (1936) as Ken Smith
- Avenging Waters (1936) as Ken Morley
- The Cattle Thief (1936) as Ken
- The Fugitive Sheriff (1936) as Ken Marshall
- Boots of Destiny (1937) as Ken Crawford
- Trailin' Trouble (1937) as John Friendly Fields / Blackie Burke
- Whirlwind Horseman (1938) as Ken Morton
- Six Shootin' Sheriff (1938) as Jim 'Trigger' Morton
- Flaming Lead (1939) as Ken Clark
- Death Rides the Range (1939) as Ken Baxter
- Phantom Rancher (1940) as Ken Mitchell
- Lightning Strikes West (1940) as Lightning Ken Morgan
- Wild Horse Stampede (1943) as U. S. Marshal Ken Maynard
- The Law Rides Again (1943) as U. S. Marshal Ken Maynard
- Blazing Guns (1943) as Marshal Ken Maynard
- Death Valley Rangers (1943) as Ken Maynard
- Westward Bound (1944) as Ken Maynard
- Arizona Whirlwind (1944) as Ken Maynard
- Harmony Trail (1944) as Ken Maynard
- Bigfoot (1970) as Mr. Bennett
- The Marshal of Windy Hollow (1972) as Texas Ranger (final film role)
