= Hell Fire Austin =

1932 film by Forrest Sheldon

Hell-Fire Austin
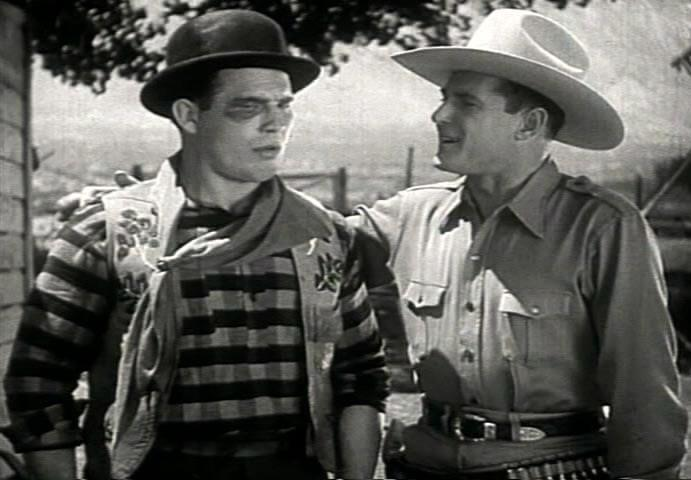
- Nat Pendleton and Ken Maynard in film
- Directed by: Forrest Sheldon
- Written by: Forrest Sheldon (story); Betty Burbridge (adaptation and continuity)
- Produced by: Phil Goldstone
- Cinematography: Ted D. McCord; Joe Novak
- Edited by: David Berg
- Distributed by: Tiffany Pictures
- Release date: March 3, 1932
- Running time: 70 minutes 65 minutes (DVD)
- Country: United States
- Language: English

Hell-Fire Austin is a 1932 American Pre-Code film directed by Forrest Sheldon.

== Plot ==
Expert horseman Austin and O'Brien are in prison when Brooks announces that she plans to run Tarzan (a champion horse) in an upcoming race. Rancher Edmonds attempts to thwart Brooks's plans by getting Austin released from prison to ride another horse to victory. After his release, Austin changes his plans and rides Tarzan in the race.

== Cast ==
- Ken Maynard as Ken "Hell-Fire" Austin
- Ivy Merton as Judy Brooks
- Nat Pendleton as Bouncer O'Brien
- Alan Roscoe as Mark Edmonds
- Jack Perrin as Curley
- Lafe McKee as Uncle Joe Brooks
- Charles Le Moyne as sheriff
- Tarzan, the Wonder Horse as Tarzan (Judy's horse)

== Soundtrack ==
- "My Buddy" (music by Walter Donaldson, lyrics by Gus Kahn), performed by Jack Kirk, Chuck Baldra and other soldiers
- "When the Bloom Is on the Sage (Round-Up Time in Texas)" (composed by Fred Howard and Nat Vincent), performed by Jack Kirk, Chuck Baldra and other riders
