= The Love Trader =

1930 film

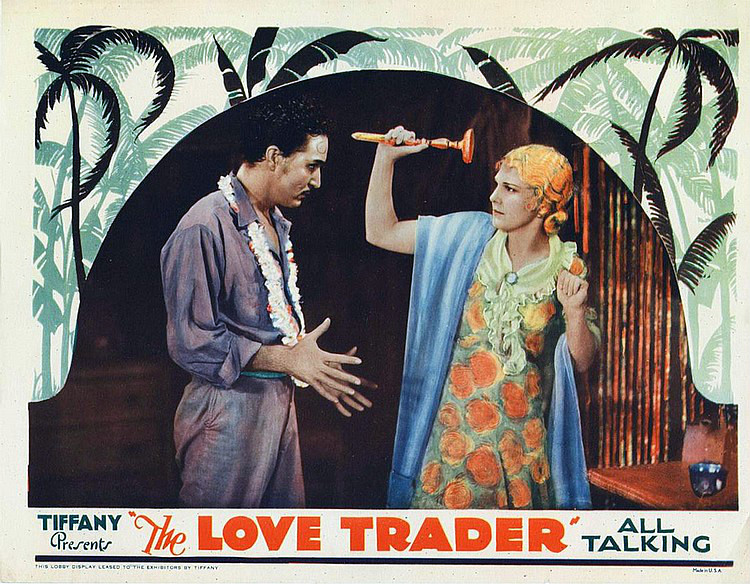
- Lobby card
- Directed by: Joseph Henabery
- Written by: Harold Shumate (story and screenplay)
- Produced by: Joseph Henabery; Harold Shumate
- Starring: Leatrice Joy; Henry B. Walthall; Noah Beery Sr.
- Cinematography: Pliny Goodfriend; Ernest Miller
- Production company: Pacific Pictures
- Distributed by: Tiffany Pictures
- Release date: September 25, 1930
- Running time: 6 reels
- Country: United States
- Language: English

The Love Trader is an early talkie pre-Code American romantic drama film preserved at the Library of Congress. It was directed by Joseph Henabery and starred silent greats Leatrice Joy, Henry B. Walthall, Barbara Bedford and Noah Beery. It was produced by an independent production company called Pacific Pictures and released through the Tiffany Pictures.

== Cast ==
- Leatrice Joy as Martha Adams
- Roland Drew as Tonia
- Henry B. Walthall as Captain Adams
- Barbara Bedford as Luane
- Noah Beery as Captain Morton
- Chester Conklin as Nelson
- Clarence Burton as John
- William Welsh as Benson
- Tom Mahoney as Sailor
- Jack Curtis as Sailor

== See also ==
- South Seas genre
