= The Grain of Dust =

1928 lost silent film

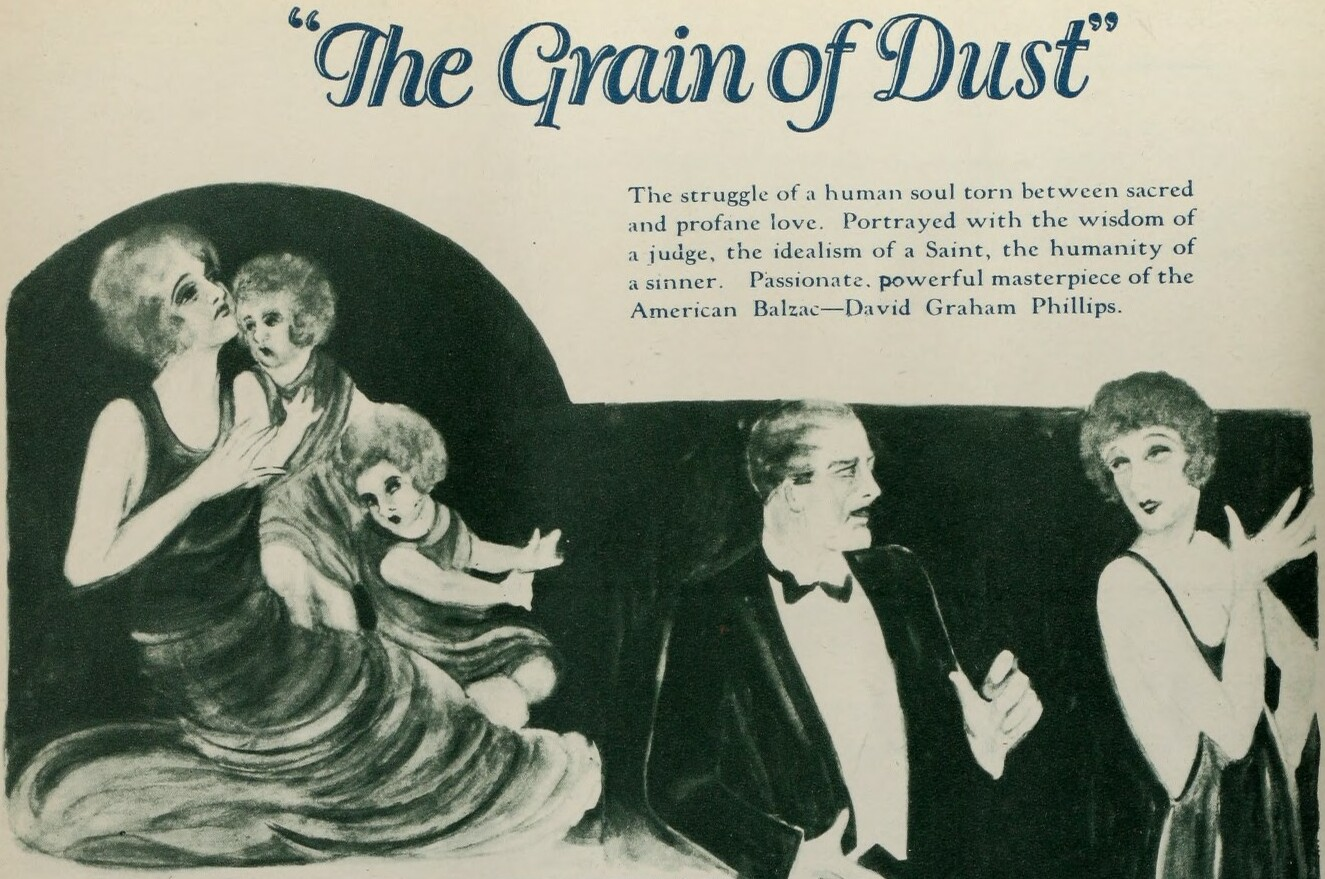
- Advertisement
- Directed by: George Archainbaud
- Written by: L. G. Rigby; Frances Hyland; Paul Perez
- Based on: The Grain of Dust by David Graham Phillips
- Produced by: John M. Stahl
- Cinematography: Ernest Miller
- Edited by: Robert Kern
- Distributed by: Tiffany-Stahl
- Release date: July 10, 1928
- Running time: 7 reels
- Country: United States
- Language: Silent (English intertitles)

The Grain of Dust is a 1928 silent drama film directed by George Archainbaud and starring Ricardo Cortez and Claire Windsor. It was produced by John M. Stahl and released through Tiffany Pictures.

== Cast ==
- Ricardo Cortez as Fred Norman
- Claire Windsor as Josephine Burroughs
- Alma Bennett as Dorothea Hallowell
- Richard Tucker as George
- John St. Polis as Mr. Burroughs
- Otto Hoffman as Head Clerk

== Censorship ==
When The Grain of Dust was released, many states and cities in the United States had censor boards that could require cuts or other eliminations before the film could be shown. The Kansas censor board ordered a cut of an intertitle with the caption, "Oh, God, how I've paid for it!"

== Preservation ==
With no prints of The Grain of Dust located in any film archives, it is a lost film.
