= Green Grass Widows =

1928 film

- Directed by: Alfred Raboch
- Written by: Wellyn Totman; Paul Perez (intertitles)
- Story by: Viola Brothers Shore
- Produced by: John M. Stahl
- Starring: Walter Hagen; Gertrude Olmstead; John Harron; Hedda Hopper
- Cinematography: Jackson Rose
- Edited by: Robert Kern
- Distributed by: Tiffany-Stahl
- Release date: June 10, 1928
- Running time: 60 minsutes
- Country: United States
- Languages: Silent; English intertitles

Green Grass Widows is a 1928 American silent comedy film directed by Alfred Raboch, and produced and released by Tiffany-Stahl Productions. The film was directed by the Alfred Raboch and starred golf player Walter Hagen. The film co-stars Hedda Hopper and Gertrude Olmstead.

== Cast ==
- Walter Hagen as himself
- Gertrude Olmstead as Betty Worthing
- John Harron as Del Roberts
- Hedda Hopper as Mrs. Worthing
- Lincoln Stedman as Fat
- Ray Hallor as Cliff

== Preservation status ==
Some sources have the film lost. However, a copy is said to be held at the British Film Institute.
