= In Old Santa Fe =

1934 film by David Howard, Joseph Kane

- Theatrical re-release poster featuring Autry
- Directed by: David Howard; Joseph Kane (uncredited)
- Screenplay by: Colbert Clark; James Gruen
- Story by: Wallace MacDonald; John Rathmell
- Produced by: Nat Levine (uncredited)
- Starring: Ken Maynard; Evalyn Knapp; George "Gabby" Hayes; Gene Autry (unbilled); Smiley Burnette (unbilled)
- Cinematography: Ernest Miller; William Nobles
- Edited by: Thomas Scott
- Music by: Harold Lewis
- Production company: Mascot Pictures
- Distributed by: Mascot Pictures
- Release date: November 15, 1934 (U.S.)
- Running time: 64 minutes
- Country: United States
- Language: English

In Old Santa Fe is a 1934 American Western film directed by David Howard, starring Ken Maynard, George "Gabby" Hayes and Evalyn Knapp and featuring the first screen appearance of Gene Autry, singing a bluegrass rendition of "Wyoming Waltz" accompanied by his own acoustic guitar with Smiley Burnette on accordion. Autry and Burnette were uncredited, but the scene served as a screen test for the duo for subsequent singing cowboy films, beginning with The Phantom Empire (1935), in which Autry had his first leading role.

Based on a story by Wallace MacDonald and John Rathmell, the film is about a cowboy who loses his horse in a rigged horse race and gets framed for the murder of a stagecoach driver. The film was shot on location in Kentucky and Keystone Studios in California.

== Plot ==
A cowboy named Kentucky Ken (Ken Maynard) and his sidekick, Cactus (George "Gabby" Hayes), meet a beautiful woman named Lila Miller (Evalyn Knapp) when her car accidentally goes off the road. Lila's father, Charlie Miller (H. B. Warner), owns the dude ranch where Ken and Cactus intend to enter their prize horse Tarzan in a gruelling canyon race. Two other men, Chandler and Tracy, have also arrived for the race. They are also plotting to blackmail Charlie, who has a secret criminal past, for half of his gold mine and ranch operation earnings. Chandler also hopes that his blackmail scheme will force Charlie into granting him permission to marry Lila, who is showing a definite interest in Ken. Charlie refuses to be bullied, however, and claims he was innocent of the crime Chandler is trying to blackmail him for.

Before the race, Chandler and Tracy trick the gambling-prone Cactus into a wager in which Tarzan will be the prize if Ken loses the race. To assure their victory, Tracy sets up a trip-wire on the course, which injures Tarzan and allows Tracy to win the race. After he discovers the broken wire and suspects foul play, Ken refuses to give up his horse to Chandler. Shamed by his foolish behavior, Cactus vows to identify the saboteur, whose boot prints he discovers in the ground near the wire.

Meanwhile, Tracy double-crosses Chandler by robbing the ranch stagecoach carrying a shipment of Charlie's gold. During the robbery, the driver is killed. Ken, who is trying to catch the bandits, is jailed for the crime after Tracy implicates him to the sheriff. With the help of Cactus and Tarzan, Ken escapes from jail and arrives at the ranch just as Chandler shoots Tracy. Again, Ken is suspected of the killing. After Cactus arrives with proof that Tracy's boots match the prints found on the racecourse, Ken tricks Chandler into a confession by claiming he possesses a damning note left by Tracy.

The sheriff reveals to Chandler that Charlie came to him about the blackmail attempt and that, unknown to Chandler, whose real name is Monte Korber, Charlie had been pardoned of the earlier crime years before. With his reputation at last clear, Ken is free to court Lila, who has always loved him.

== Cast ==
- Ken Maynard as Ken, alias Kentucky
- Evalyn Knapp as Lila Miller
- H. B. Warner as Charlie Miller
- Kenneth Thomson as Matt Korber, alias Mr. Chandler
- Wheeler Oakman as Tracy
- George "Gabby" Hayes as Cactus
- George Burton as henchman Red
- George Chesebro as henchman Nick
- Gene Autry as Gene, the guest singer (uncredited)
- Smiley Burnette as accordionist-singer (uncredited)
- Bob Nolan as singing voice of Ken (uncredited)
- Tarzan as Tarzan, Kentucky's horse

== Production ==
=== Casting ===
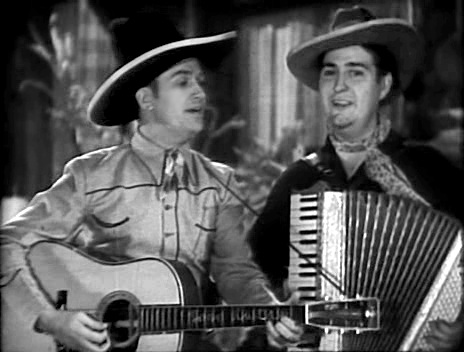
Gene Autry and Smiley Burnette in In Old Santa Fe

In Old Santa Fe was Ken Maynard's first film for Mascot Pictures. He was paid $10,000 per week for four weeks to shoot the serial film. He was the highest-paid Western actor in Hollywood at the time. For the first time, longtime character actor George Hayes developed a new "cranky but lovable" sidekick character that became very popular with audiences and led to his definitive sidekick role in John Wayne and Hopalong Cassidy Westerns and later, as Gabby Hayes, brought him "singing-cowboy immortality" in Gene Autry and Roy Rogers films. The film also features the first screen appearance of Gene Autry, singing a bluegrass rendition of "Wyoming Waltz" accompanied by Smiley Burnette on accordion. Both Autry and Burnette were unbilled, but the scene served as a screen test that would lead to many subsequent singing cowboy films. The film was later re-released with Gene Autry being given top billing in the redesigned film credits.

=== Principal photography ===
Filming began on September 17, 1934, at Mack Sennett's Keystone Studios in California, and the principal photography was concluded in late September 1934. The producer, Nat Levine, introduced a modern West setting for the film, a dude ranch where horses and roadsters shared the open spaces and the actors dressed in contemporary Western fashions. The traditional lawman hero was replaced by radio stars and touring entertainers who "happened to foil evildoers in their spare time, rode powerful, intelligent horses, and formed posses composed of guitarists, fiddlers, and harmony singers." This new modern approach to the Western became a hallmark of Gene Autry and Roy Rogers films made at Republic Pictures in the coming decade.

=== Filming locations ===
- Keystone Studios, 1712 Glendale Blvd., Silver Lake, Los Angeles, California, USA (studio)

=== Soundtrack ===
- "As Long As I've Got My Dog" (Harold Lewis, Bernie Grossman) by Ken Maynard (dubbed by Bob Nolan)
- "Someday in Wyoming" by Gene Autry
- "Mama Don't Like Music" (Gene Autry, Smiley Burnette) by Smiley Burnette
- "Down In Old Santa Fe" (Harold Lewis, Bernie Grossman) by Gene Autry and Smiley Burnette
- "Because You Didn't Get a Girl" by Ken Maynard (dubbed by Bob Nolan)
