= Paradise Island (film) =

1930 film

- Directed by: Bert Glennon
- Written by: M.B. Deering; Monte M. Katterjohn
- Starring: Kenneth Harlan; Marceline Day; Tom Santschi
- Cinematography: Max Dupont
- Edited by: Byron Robinson
- Music by: Al Short
- Production company: Tiffany Pictures
- Distributed by: Tiffany Pictures
- Release date: July 15, 1930
- Running time: 68 minutes
- Country: United States
- Language: English

Paradise Island is a 1930 American pre-Code adventure film directed by Bert Glennon and starring Kenneth Harlan, Marceline Day, and Tom Santschi.

== Plot ==
Ellen Bradford travels to the remote South Sea island of Tonga to marry her fiancé, only to discover that he has become a hopeless drunk and is no longer the man she believed him to be. As the only white woman on the island, she quickly attracts the attention of three very different men — including the dangerous and manipulative “Dutch Mike” Lutze, a local power broker feared by everyone.

Ellen soon learns that Lutze cannot be trusted, leaving her with only one potential ally: Jim Thorne, a rugged adventurer with a pirate’s instincts but a gentleman’s heart. Tension builds as Lutze and Thorne clash over control, pride, and Ellen’s future. Their rivalry culminates in a high‑stakes poker game where they gamble for a plantation, a fortune in pearls, and even Ellen herself — with Lutze secretly using a marked deck to cheat his way to victory.

Set against the exotic backdrop of the South Seas, Paradise Island blends romance, danger, and adventure as Ellen must navigate treachery, temptation, and the struggle between two powerful men vying for dominance.

== Cast ==
- Kenneth Harlan as Jim Thorne
- Marceline Day as Ellen Bradford
- Tom Santschi as Dutch Mike Lutze
- Paul Hurst as Beauty
- Betty Boyd as Poppi
- Victor Potel as Swede
- Gladden James as Roy Armstrong
- Will Stanton as Limey

== Bibliography ==
- Pitts, Michael R. Poverty Row Studios, 1929–1940: An Illustrated History of 55 Independent Film Companies, with a Filmography for Each. McFarland & Company, 2005.
