= The Sunset Trail (1932 film) =

1932 film by B. Reeves Eason

- Directed by: B. Reeves Eason
- Written by: Bennett Cohn
- Produced by: Phil Goldstone
- Starring: Ken Maynard; Ruth Hiatt
- Cinematography: Arthur Reed
- Production company: Tiffany Pictures
- Release date: January 7, 1932
- Running time: 62 minutes
- Country: United States
- Language: English

The Sunset Trail is a 1932 American Western film directed by B. Reeves Eason.

== Cast ==
- Ken Maynard as Jim Brandon
- Ruth Hiatt as Molly Mason
- Frank Rice as Taterbug
- Philo McCullough as Joe Weller, banker
- Buddy Hunter as Buddy
- Richard Alexander as One-Shot, henchman
