= Two Gun Man =

1931 film directed by Phil Rosen

- Directed by: Phil Rosen
- Screenplay by: Jack Natteford
- Story by: W. Scott Darling
- Produced by: Phil Goldstone
- Starring: Ken Maynard; Lucille Powers; Charles King
- Cinematography: Arthur Reed
- Edited by: Martin G. Cohn
- Production company: Tiffany Productions
- Release date: May 15, 1931 (US)
- Running time: 63 minutes
- Country: United States
- Language: English

Two Gun Man is a 1931 American pre-Code Western film directed by Phil Rosen and starring Ken Maynard, Lucille Powers, and Charles King. It was released on May 15, 1931, by Tiffany Productions and was later re-released by Amity Pictures.

== Plot ==
Carson City, Nevada, 1896: A large consolidate cattle company aims to bring in 40,000 head of cattle under the Federal government's open range program. This will wipe out the local ranchers. To speed up the demise of the locals, Tulliver, the head of the cattle conglomerate decides on a two-prong attack in the range war. First he hires gunslingers, called "Two Gun Men" based on the pair of revolvers they carry. The second plan is infiltrating a fifth column of his men who act as range hands for the locals, but do all they can to destroy their herds.

During a gunfight in the street, Tolliver sees two new arrivals, Blackie and Old Joe. Impressed by their behaviour under fire, Tolliver decides to hire Blackie as one of his Two Gun Men. Blackie says he will only work for him if he accepts his elderly mentor Joe. Tolliver laughs at Joe's age, Blackie replies what better recommendation is there for a two gun man than surviving into old age. Tolliver agrees to hire them.

When Blackie sees what Tolliver is up to, he changes his mind on signing up. After Joe leaves to eat, Blackie stays behind for dinner at the saloon and meets Kitty, an amusing bargirl and they strike up a relationship. As Tolliver is enraged that Blackie changed his mind about working for him, he gets angrier as he his sweet on Kitty. Tolliver belts Blackie with a sucker punch with brass knuckles and throws him out.

Old Joe comes back with his two guns that he holds the saloon at bay with where Blackie wants the chance to get even with Tolliver in a fair fight, where Tolliver comes out second best.

Blackie and Joe get hired by the local ranchers where they train them to be two gun men.

== Cast ==
- Ken Maynard as Blackie Weed
- Lucille Powers as Joan Markham
- Charles King as Thorne
- Nita Martan as Kitty
- Murdock MacQuarrie as Rancher Markham
- Lafe McKee as Joe Kearney
- Tarzan, the Wonder Horse as Tarzan
- Tom London as Tulliver
- Walter Perry as Riggs
- Will Stanton as Kettle Belly
