= The Cavalier (film) =

1928 film

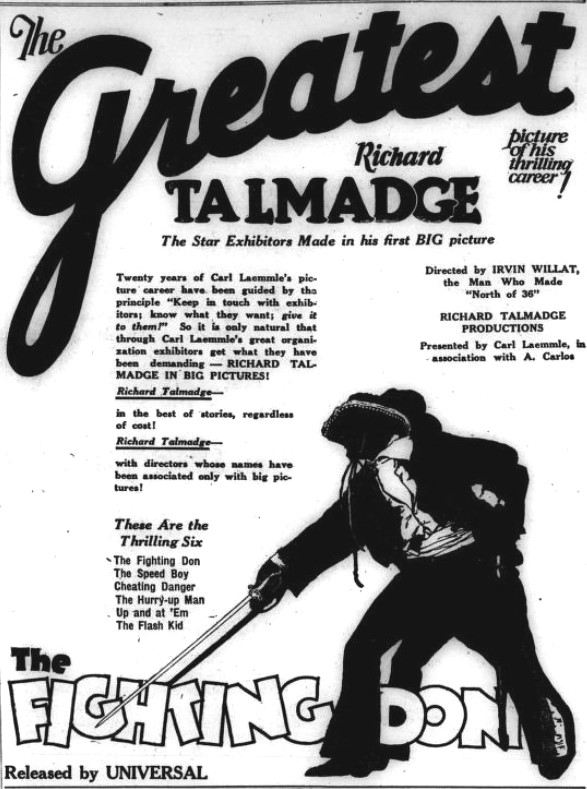
- 1926 advertisement using the alternative title The Fighting Don
- Directed by: Irvin Willat
- Written by: Victor Irvin (screenplay)
- Based on: The Cavalier by Max Brand
- Produced by: John M. Stahl
- Starring: Richard Talmadge; Barbara Bedford
- Cinematography: Harry Cooper; Jack Stevens
- Edited by: Doane Harrison
- Music by: Hugo Riesenfeld
- Distributed by: Tiffany Studios
- Release date: November 1, 1928
- Running time: 7 reels
- Country: United States
- Languages: Sound (Synchronized) (English Intertitles)

The Cavalier is a 1928 American synchronized sound Western film directed by Irvin Willat, distributed by Tiffany Studios, and starring Richard Talmadge and Barbara Bedford. While the film has no audible dialog, it was released with a synchronized musical score with sound effects using both the sound-on-disc and sound-on-film process.

== Plot ==
The story unfolds during the waning days of Spain's vast Western empire, where proud Spanish Dons maintain their control over distant colonies and native peoples. The grand and ruthless landowner Ramon Torreno (David Torrence), a man who rose from humble origins in Barcelona's wine shops, now wields immense power and wealth in the New World. His son, Carlos Torreno (David Mir), is eager to ascend the social ladder and marry into an aristocratic family from Aragon, a match intended to cement their status.

Lucia D’Arquista (Barbara Bedford), a proud and beautiful young woman from an impoverished noble family, is sent from Spain to marry Carlos. Though her family hopes to restore their lost wealth and influence through this alliance, Lucia herself is despondent and resistant, longing for freedom from this mercenary marriage.

Her aunt, who favors any match that brings money, pressures her to accept her duty. The local priest counsels Lucia to submit dutifully, emphasizing the restoration of her family's name and the sacrifices involved. Lucia, however, grows weary and homesick, confiding in Taki (Richard Talmadge), a trusted native sheepherder and guide who leads the bridal caravan through dangerous territory.

Opposing Ramon Torreno's tyranny is the enigmatic figure known only as El Caballero (“The Knight”), a heroic and mysterious protector who champions the oppressed Indians. Loved by the natives and feared by the wealthy landowners, El Caballero is the one man who dares to challenge Torreno's iron rule.

Though some suspect Taki might be connected to El Caballero, few know the truth — Taki himself is El Caballero, secretly donning the mask of the noble avenger. He rescues captive slaves and fights against the cruel overseers employed by Torreno, disrupting their plans to enlarge the Torreno hacienda in preparation for Carlos's wedding.

Pierre Gaston (Christian J. Frank), a sinister overseer with unclear origins — possibly French or Sicilian — acts as Ramon Torreno's devilish enforcer. He oversees the brutal labor of Indian slaves brought to work on the estate. When El Caballero frees some of these slaves, Gaston swears vengeance.

Despite Torreno's attempts to trap El Caballero — including bottling him up in a canyon with Sergeant Juan Dinero (Stuart Holmes) and a squadron of cavalry — El Caballero escapes repeatedly, outwitting his foes and protecting the helpless.

Taki is hired to guide the bridal caravan eastward through the cliffs of Capistrano toward the Torreno estate. Along the journey, Lucia expresses her dread and despair over the marriage. She pleads with Torreno to release her from the contract, but he insists on the union, believing that wealth and duty outweigh personal desire.

That night, Gaston and his bandits attempt to kidnap Lucia, hoping to hold her for ransom or worse. El Caballero intervenes in a dramatic duel, disarming and defeating Gaston, igniting chaos within the camp. Gaston, however, deceitfully claims El Caballero tried to kidnap Lucia himself, stirring suspicion.

Ramon Torreno, convinced that Taki has failed in his duty to guard Lucia, sentences him to death — ordering him to be set free unarmed and on foot, 500 paces ahead of a pack of ravenous dogs known as "Ramon Torreno’s Hounds of Hell."

Against all odds, Taki survives the attack by the dogs and disappears into the wilderness, unseen by his enemies. Meanwhile, the wedding day dawns, and the estate is prepared for the ceremony, but Lucia's heart is elsewhere.

On the morning of the wedding, Taki reappears, disguised but recognized. He is captured and brought before a firing squad, condemned to death as a traitor. Torreno hopes that the execution of El Caballero will break Lucia's spirit and force her compliance.

Yet Lucia remains calm and resolute, refusing to betray the man she loves. El Caballero escapes the dungeon by stealing the clothes of Sergeant Dinero, joining the wedding procession.

In a thrilling climax, Gaston grabs Lucia to prevent her escape, but El Caballero swoops in, rescuing her and sparking a desperate pursuit. They leap across a wide gorge to evade their pursuers; Gaston attempts the same feat but falls to his death.

Defeated and humiliated, the Torreno family withdraws.

In the film's closing moments, El Caballero reveals his true identity as Juan Francisco de Avendano, the "Fighting Don," who returns to Spain with Lucia as his bride — restoring her honor and securing a future free from tyranny.

== Cast ==
- Richard Talmadge as El Caballero / Taki
- Barbara Bedford as Lucia D'Arquista
- Nora Cecil as Lucia's Aunt
- David Torrence as Ramón Torreno
- David Mir as Carlos Torreno
- Stuart Holmes as Sergeant Juan Dinero
- Christian J. Frank as Pierre Gaston (credited as Christian Frank)
- Oliver Eckhardt as The Padre

== Music ==
The film featured a theme song entitled "My Cavalier” composed by Hugo Riesenfeld (music) and R. Meredith Willson (lyrics).

== Background/Production ==
Originally intended to be an all-sound film, the picture was shot silent and was distributed with a music and special effects soundtrack, with no dialogue, due to technical issues with the sound synchronization equipment.

== Preservation ==
Previously considered to be a lost film, the film exists in the Spanish archive Filmoteca de Catalunya, Barcelona. Another print survives at the BFI film archive.

== See also ==
- List of early sound feature films (1926–1929)
