= Snowbound (1927 film) =

1927 film

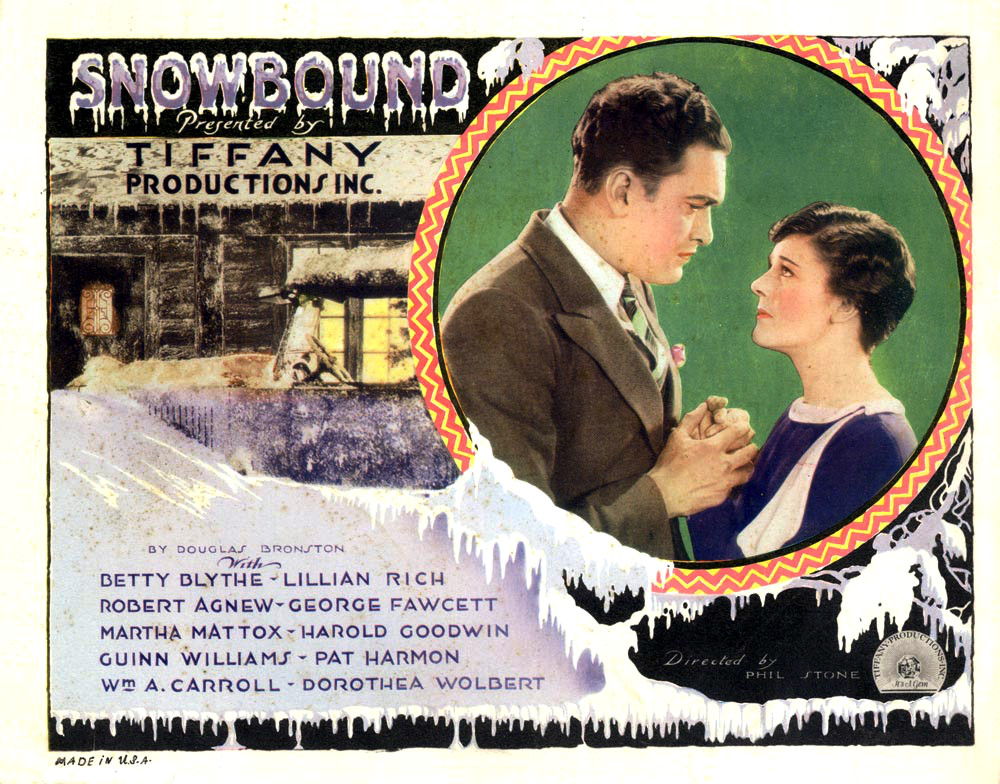
- Lobby card
- Directed by: Phil Goldstone
- Written by: Douglas Bronston (story, scenario)
- Produced by: Tiffany Pictures
- Starring: Betty Blythe; Robert Agnew
- Cinematography: Joseph Dubray; E. Fox Walker; Elwood Bredell
- Edited by: Leroy O. Lodwig
- Distributed by: Tiffany Pictures
- Release date: May 1, 1927
- Running time: 60 minutes
- Country: United States
- Language: Silent (English intertitles)

Snowbound is a 1927 American silent comedy film produced and released by Tiffany Pictures and directed by Phil Goldstone. It stars Robert Agnew, Betty Blythe and Harold Goodwin.

== Cast ==
- Betty Blythe as Julia Barry
- Lillian Rich as Alice Blake
- Robert Agnew as Robert Foley
- George Fawcett as Uncle Tim Foley
- Martha Mattox as Aunt Amelia Foley
- Harold Goodwin as Joe Baird
- Guinn "Big Boy" Williams as Bull Morgan (credited as Guinn Williams)
- Pat Harmon as Mr. Parker
- William A. Carroll as Judge Watkins
- Dorothea Wolbert as Maid

== Preservation ==
A copy of Snowbound is preserved at the Library of Congress.
