= Texas Gun Fighter =

1932 film by Phil Rosen

- Directed by: Phil Rosen
- Written by: Ben Cohen
- Produced by: Quadruple Film; Tiffany Pictures
- Starring: Ken Maynard
- Cinematography: Jackson Rose
- Edited by: Jerry Webb
- Distributed by: Tiffany Pictures
- Release date: February 14, 1932
- Running time: 63 minutes
- Country: United States

Texas Gun Fighter is a 1932 American Western film directed by Phil Rosen and starring Ken Maynard. It was produced and distributed by the soon-to-be-defunct Tiffany Pictures.

A print of the film is preserved in the Library of Congress.

== Plot ==
Bill Dane, known as the Texas gunfighter, quits an outlaw gang after a dispute with its leader, Drag Kells, and rides for Silver City with his crippled friend Benny. Along the way, they rescue Jane Adams, whose freight wagon is under attack, and earn the gratitude of her father, the local mining magnate, who arranges medical care for Benny. The townspeople, unaware of Bill's past, elect him sheriff, but Kells soon arrives and forces Bill to crack open the mining company safe. Bill turns the tables, recovers the bullion, and defeats the gang.

== Cast ==
- Ken Maynard as Bill Dane
- Sheila Mannors as Jane Adams
- Harry Woods as Mason
- Lloyd Ingraham as Banty
- James "Jim" Mason as Drag Kells
- Bob Fleming as Clayton
- Edgar Lewis as Frank Adams
- Frank Hall Crane
