= Lost at Sea (film) =

1926 film

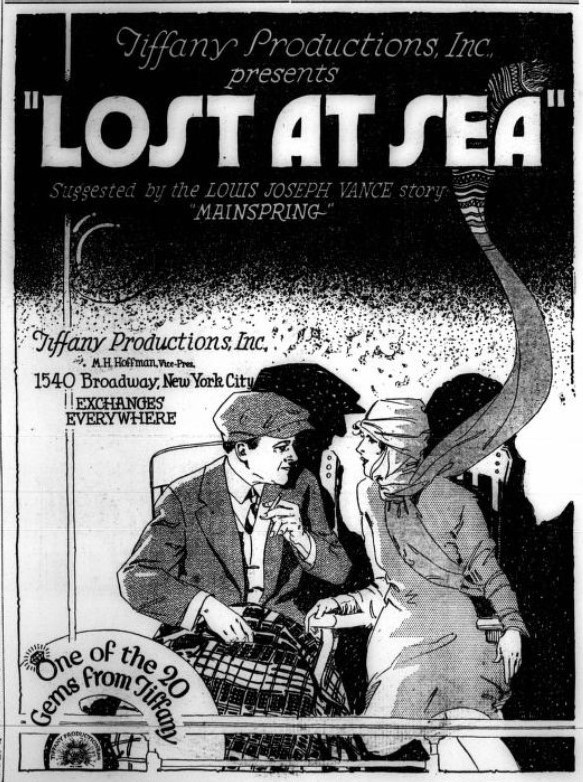
- Advertisement
- Directed by: Louis J. Gasnier
- Written by: Esther Shulkin
- Based on: the short story, "The Mainspring" by Louis Joseph Vance
- Produced by: Phil Goldstone
- Starring: Huntley Gordon; Lowell Sherman; Jane Novak
- Cinematography: Milton Moore; Mack Stengler
- Edited by: James C. McKay
- Distributed by: Tiffany Pictures; Shoninger(1928 re-release)
- Release date: September 1, 1926
- Running time: 70 minutes
- Country: United States
- Language: Silent (English intertitles)

Lost at Sea is a 1926 American silent drama film directed by Louis J. Gasnier and starring Lowell Sherman. It was produced and released by the Tiffany Productions.

== Cast ==
- Huntley Gordon as Richard Lane
- Lowell Sherman as Norman Travers
- Jane Novak as Natalie Travers
- Natalie Kingston as Nita Howard
- Billy Kent Schaefer as Bobby Travers
- Joan Standing as Olga
- Will Walling as Chief of Detectives (credited as William Walling)
- Neal Dodd as Reverend Atkinson (credited as Rev. Neal Dodd)

== Preservation ==
With no prints of Lost at Sea located in any film archives, it is a lost film.
