= Branded Men =

1931 film by Phil Rosen

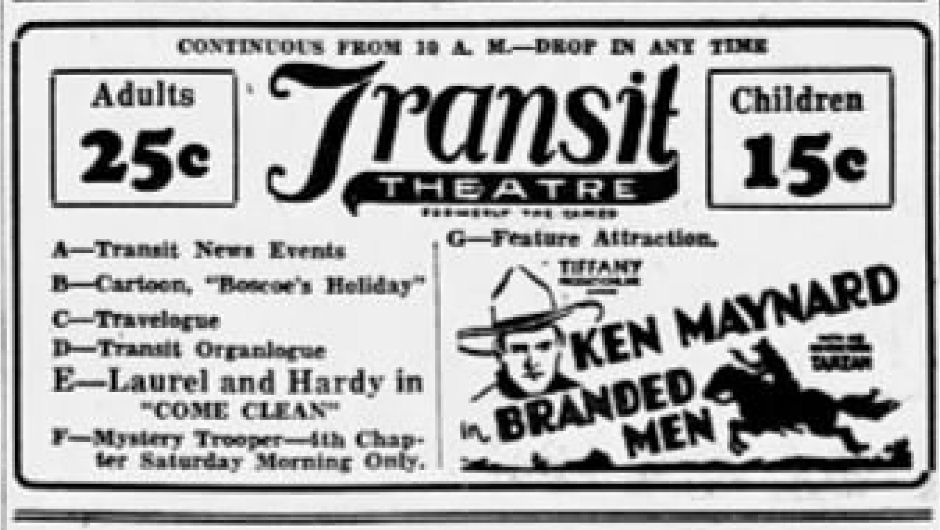
- Newspaper advertisement
- Directed by: Phil Rosen
- Written by: Earl Snell
- Produced by: Tiffany Pictures
- Starring: Ken Maynard
- Cinematography: Arthur Reed
- Edited by: Earl Turner
- Distributed by: Tiffany Pictures
- Release date: October 1, 1931
- Running time: 7 reels
- Country: United States
- Language: English

Branded Men is a 1931 American pre-Code Western comedy film directed by Phil Rosen and starring Ken Maynard. It was produced and distributed by Tiffany Pictures.

== Plot ==
After Rod Whitaker and his friends, Ramrod and Half-a-Rod, have their horses stolen by outlaws, they head to the nearest town, where Rod applies for the position of sheriff. Rod falls in love with Dale Winters and, out of his affection for her, promises to protect her brother Bud, a weak-willed young man.

The saloon owner, Ramsey, corrupts Bud as an act of revenge because Bud's father, Judge Winters, sentenced Ramsey's brother to a prison term that ended in his death. Ramsey forces Bud to repay a gambling debt by committing a robbery. Upon learning of Ramsey's plans, Rod and Ramrod stake out the bank where the robbery is set to take place. In the ensuing shootout, Ramrod is killed.

Distraught by the turn of events, Bud wants to confess, but Ramsey prevents him from doing so. Bud decides to defy him, but while waiting to speak with the sheriff, he sees a note that he realizes was sent to lure Rod and Dale into an ambush. Bud rides Rod's horse and is wounded in Rod's place during the attack. Bud survives and exposes Ramsey. Rod assures Bud that his personal sacrifice will lighten his punishment for the robbery, and the story concludes with Rod and Dale embracing.

== Cast ==
- Ken Maynard as Rod Whitaker
- Tarzan as Tarzan (Whitaker's horse)
- June Clyde as Dale Wilson
- Irving Bacon as Ramrod
- Billy Bletcher as Half-A-rod
- Charles King as Mace
- Hooper Atchley as Ramsey, aka Cunningham
- Donald Keith as Bud Wilson
- Gladden James as Sam (bookkeeper)
- Robert Homans as chairman
- Edmund Cobb as man giving directions
