= The Haunted Ship =

1927 film directed by Forrest Sheldon

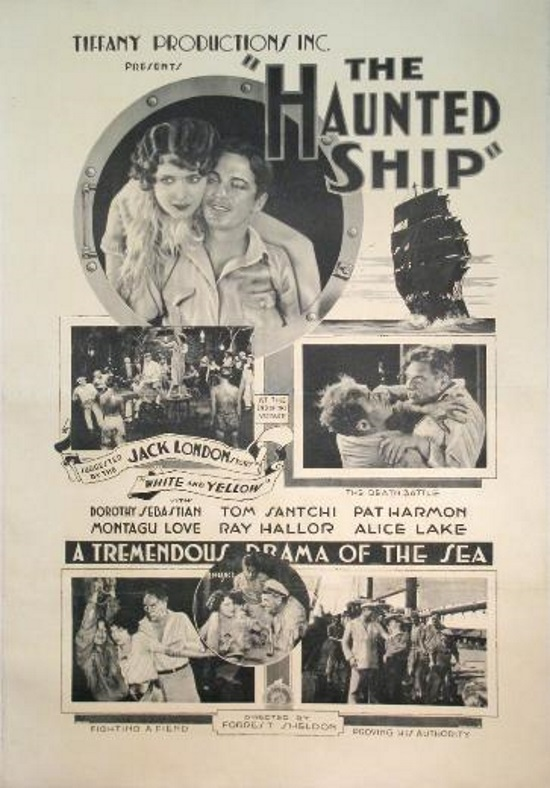
- Directed by: Forrest Sheldon
- Written by: Jack London (story); Harry Braxton; E. Morton Hough; Ben Ali Newman; Forrest Sheldon; Viola Brothers Shore
- Produced by: Roy Fitzroy; John M. Stahl
- Starring: Dorothy Sebastian; Montagu Love; Tom Santschi
- Cinematography: Paul Kerschner; J.O. Taylor
- Edited by: Leete Renick Brown
- Production company: Tiffany-Stahl Productions
- Distributed by: Tiffany Pictures
- Release date: December 1, 1927
- Running time: 50 minutes
- Country: United States
- Languages: Silent; English intertitles

The Haunted Ship is a 1927 American silent drama film directed by Forrest Sheldon and starring Dorothy Sebastian, Montagu Love, and Tom Santschi. It is based on a story White and Yellow by Jack London.

== Cast ==
- Dorothy Sebastian as Goldie Kane
- Montagu Love as Captain Simon Gant
- Tom Santschi as Glenister (first mate)
- Ray Hallor as Danny Gant
- Pat Harmon as Mate
- Alice Lake as Martha Gant
- Bud Duncan as Dinty
- Blue Washington as Mose
- Sôjin Kamiyama as Bombay Charlie
- Andrée Tourneur as Goldie's Companion

== Bibliography ==
- Munden, Kenneth White. The American Film Institute Catalog of Motion Pictures Produced in the United States, Part 1. University of California Press, 1997.
