= My Lady's Past =

1929 film

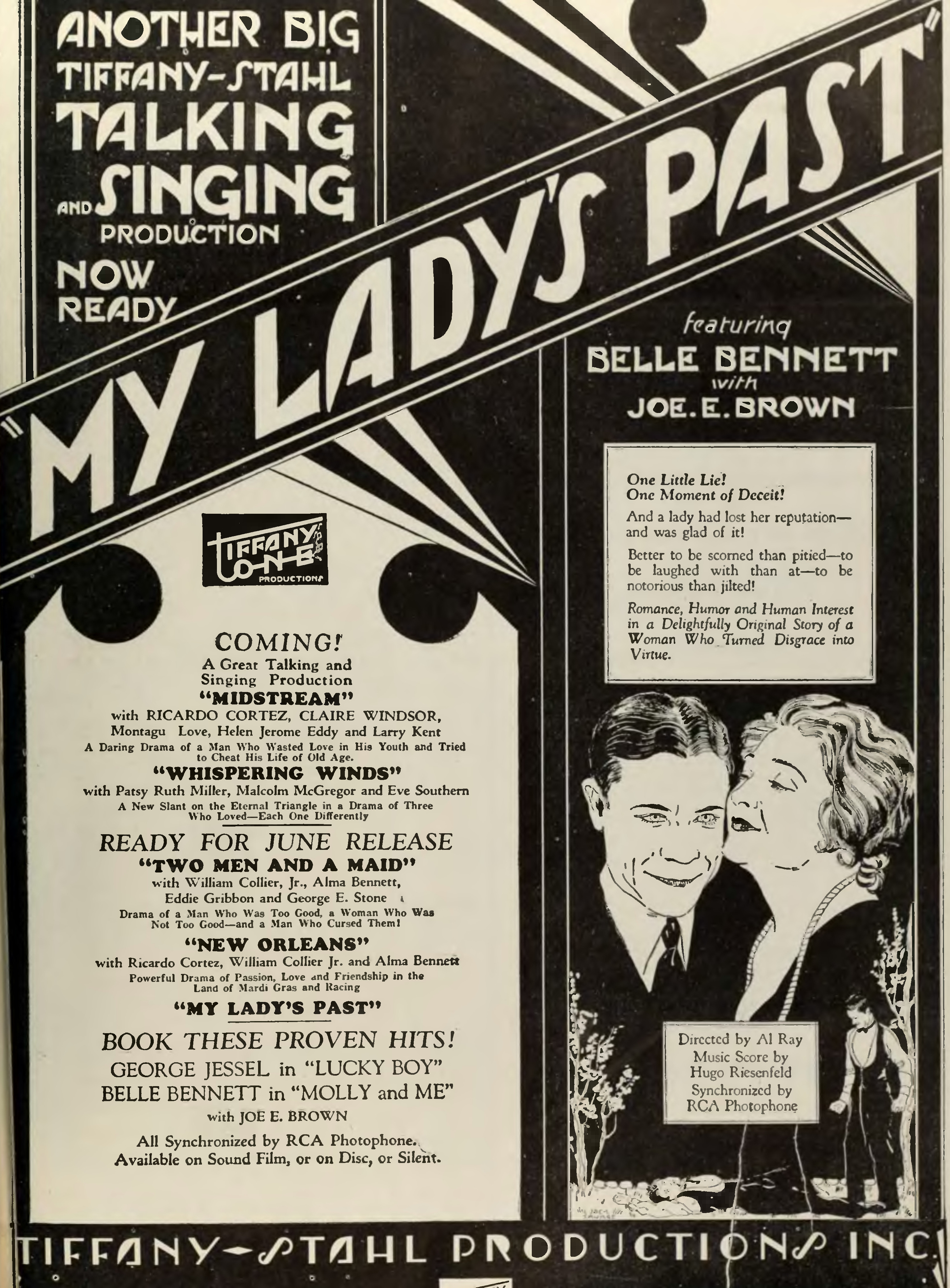
- Directed by: Albert Ray
- Written by: Fanny Hatton; Frederic Hatton; Frances Hyland
- Produced by: John M. Stahl
- Starring: Belle Bennett; Joe E. Brown; Alma Bennett
- Cinematography: Harry Jackson
- Edited by: George M. Merrick
- Music by: Hugo Riesenfeld
- Production company: Tiffany Pictures
- Distributed by: Tiffany Pictures
- Release date: April 1, 1929
- Running time: 9 reels
- Country: United States
- Languages: Sound (Part-Talkie); English Intertitles

My Lady's Past is a 1929 American sound part-talkie drama film directed by Albert Ray and starring Belle Bennett, Joe E. Brown and Alma Bennett. In addition to sequences with audible dialogue or talking sequences, the film features a synchronized musical score and sound effects along with English intertitles. The soundtrack was recorded using the Tiffany-Tone sound-on-film system using RCA Photophone equipment. After completing his first novel, a writer abandons his wife for his secretary. The film survives at BFI/National Film And Television Archive.

== Cast ==
- Belle Bennett as Mamie Reynolds
- Joe E. Brown as Sam Young
- Alma Bennett as Typist
- Russell Simpson as John Parker
- Joan Standing as Maid
- Billie Bennett as Gossip

== Music ==
The film features a theme song entitled "A Kiss To Remember" with lyrics by Al Bryan and music by Al Goering and Jack Pettis.

== See also ==
- List of early sound feature films (1926–1929)

== Bibliography ==
- Pitts, Michael R. Poverty Row Studios, 1929–1940: An Illustrated History of 55 Independent Film Companies, with a Filmography for Each. McFarland & Company, 2005.
