= Two Men and a Maid =

1929 film

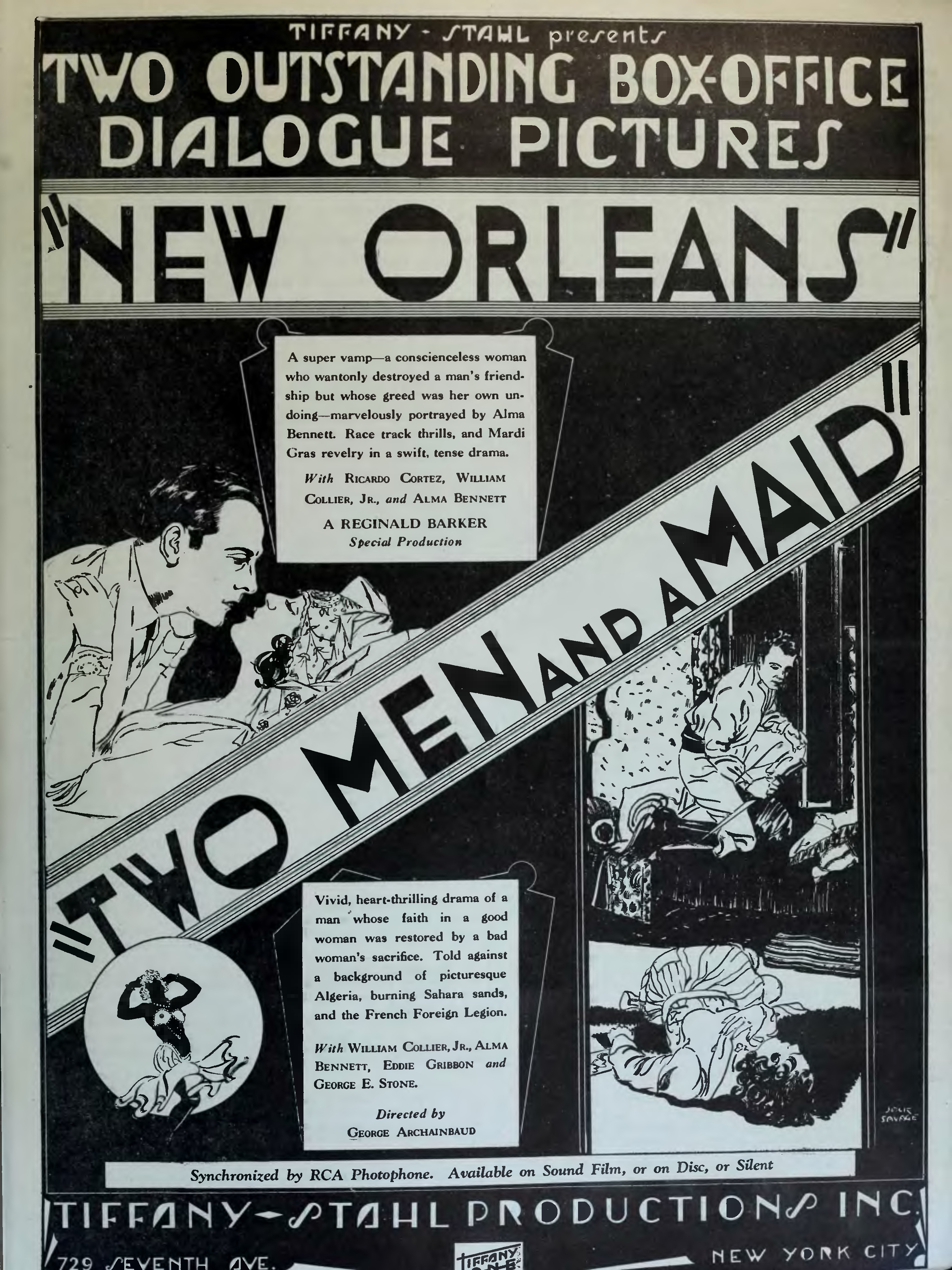
- 1929 advertisement in The Film Daily
- Directed by: George Archainbaud
- Written by: Fanny Hatton; Frederic Hatton; Frances Hyland; Jack Natteford
- Produced by: John M. Stahl
- Starring: William Collier Jr.; Alma Bennett; Eddie Gribbon
- Cinematography: Harry Jackson
- Edited by: Desmond O'Brien
- Music by: Hugo Riesenfeld
- Production company: Tiffany Pictures
- Distributed by: Tiffany Pictures
- Release date: June 10, 1929
- Running time: 73 minutes
- Country: United States
- Languages: Sound (Part-Talkie); English intertitles

Two Men and a Maid is a 1929 American sound part-talkie romantic drama film directed by George Archainbaud and starring William Collier Jr., Alma Bennett, and Eddie Gribbon. In addition to sequences with audible dialogue or talking sequences, the film features a synchronized musical score and sound effects along with English intertitles. The soundtrack was recorded using the Tiffany-Tone sound-on-film system using RCA Photophone equipment.

== Premise ==
Wrongly believing that his wife has another lover, a man enlists in the French Foreign Legion and goes out to serve in Algeria.

== Cast ==
- William Collier Jr. as Jim Oxford
- Alma Bennett as Rose
- Eddie Gribbon as Adjutant
- George E. Stone as Shorty
- Margaret Quimby as Margaret

== Music ==
The film features a theme song entitled "Love Will Find You" which was composed by Abel Baer and L. Wolfe Gilbert.

== See also ==
- List of early sound feature films (1926–1929)

== Bibliography ==
- Pitts, Michael R. Poverty Row Studios, 1929–1940: An Illustrated History of 55 Independent Film Companies, with a Filmography for Each. McFarland & Company, 2005.
