= New Orleans (1929 film) =

1929 film directed by Reginald Barker

- French poster
- Directed by: Reginald Barker
- Written by: Fanny Hatton; Frederic Hatton; Jack Natteford
- Produced by: John M. Stahl
- Starring: Ricardo Cortez; William Collier Jr.; Alma Bennett
- Cinematography: Harry Jackson
- Edited by: Robert Kern
- Music by: Hugo Riesenfeld
- Production company: Tiffany Pictures
- Distributed by: Tiffany Pictures
- Release date: June 2, 1929
- Running time: 68 minutes
- Country: United States
- Languages: Sound (Part-Talkie); English Intertitles

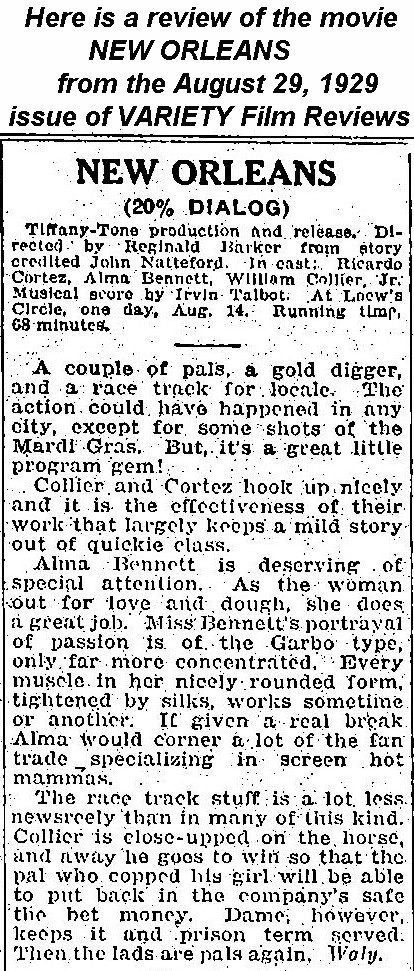

New Orleans is a lost 1929 American sound part-talkie drama film directed by Reginald Barker and starring Ricardo Cortez, William Collier Jr., Alma Bennett. In addition to sequences with audible dialogue or talking sequences, the film features a synchronized musical score and sound effects along with English intertitles. The soundtrack was recorded using the Tiffany-Tone sound-on-film system using RCA Photophone equipment. The film was produced and distributed by the independent Tiffany Pictures. The soundtrack is still in existence.

== Synopsis ==
Two friends, a jockey and a racetrack owner, fall out over a woman they both love.

== Cast ==
- Ricardo Cortez as Jim Morley
- William Collier Jr. as Billy Slade
- Alma Bennett as Marie Cartier

== Music ==
The film features a theme song entitled "Pals Forever" which was composed by Hugo Riesenfeld (music) and Ted Shapiro (lyrics).

== See also ==
- List of early sound feature films (1926–1929)

== Bibliography ==
- Pitts, Michael R. Poverty Row Studios, 1929–1940: An Illustrated History of 55 Independent Film Companies, with a Filmography for Each. McFarland & Company, 2005.
