= Nameless Men =

1928 film

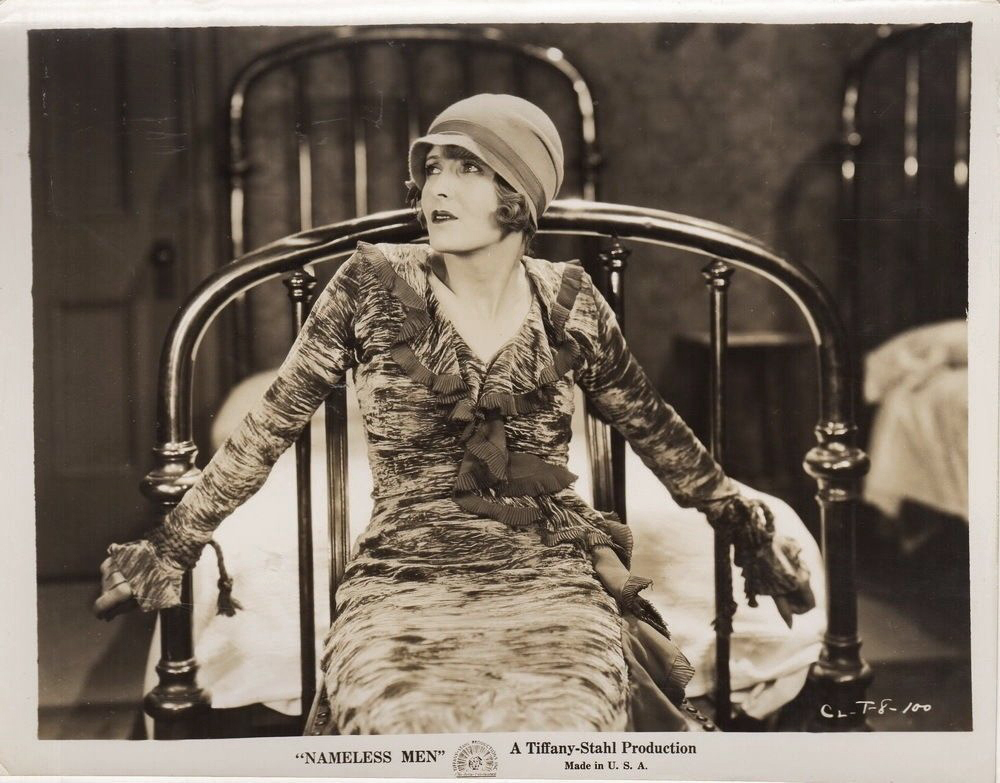
- Lobby card
- Directed by: Christy Cabanne
- Written by: Harry Braxton; Jack Natteford; Viola Brothers Shore
- Story by: E. Morton Hough
- Produced by: John M. Stahl
- Starring: Claire Windsor; Antonio Moreno; Eddie Gribbon
- Cinematography: Chester A. Lyons
- Edited by: Martin G. Cohn
- Production company: Tiffany Pictures
- Distributed by: Tiffany Pictures
- Release date: February 12, 1928
- Running time: 60 minutes
- Country: United States
- Language: Silent (English intertitles)

Nameless Men is a 1928 American silent drama film directed by Christy Cabanne and starring Claire Windsor, Antonio Moreno, and Eddie Gribbon.

== Cast ==
- Claire Windsor as Mary
- Antonio Moreno as Robert Strong
- Eddie Gribbon as Blackie
- Ray Hallor as Hughie
- Charles Clary as Mac
- Carolynne Snowden as Maid
- Sally Rand
- Stepin Fetchit

== Preservation ==
With no prints of Nameless Men located in any film archives, it is a lost film.

== Bibliography ==
- Monaco, James. The Encyclopedia of Film. Perigee Books, 1991.
