= Arizona Terror =

1931 film

- Directed by: Phil Rosen
- Written by: Jack Natteford
- Produced by: Phil Goldstone
- Starring: Ken Maynard; Lina Basquette; Hooper Atchley
- Cinematography: Arthur Reed
- Edited by: Martin G. Cohn
- Production company: Tiffany Productions
- Distributed by: Tiffany Productions
- Release date: September 13, 1931
- Running time: 65 minutes
- Country: United States
- Language: English

Arizona Terror is a 1931 American pre-Code Western film directed by Phil Rosen and starring Ken Maynard, Lina Basquette and Hooper Atchley.

== Plot ==
Businessman Cole Porter buys cattle from ranchers only to kill them later and recover the money that he paid them. His scheme begins to unravel when one rancher (The Arizonian) survives being wounded. Kay Moore finds The Arizonian and cares for him at her home until her father becomes the next victim. Moore suspects The Arizonian of being the culprit. He flees and joins Mexican outlaw Emilio Vasquez to capture Porter and reveal him as the true criminal.

== Cast ==
- Ken Maynard as The Arizonian
- Lina Basquette as Kay Moore
- Hooper Atchley as Captain Cole Porter
- Nina Quartero as Lola
- Michael Visaroff as Emilio Vasquez
- Murdock MacQuarrie as Joe Moore
- Charles King as Henchman Ike
- Tom London as Henchman Chuckawalla

== Production ==
In addition to Rosen as director, Phil Goldstone was the producer, and Jack Natteford was the writer. Arthur Reed was the photographer, Ralph M. DeLacy was the art director, and Martin G. Cohn was the film editor. Vasquez Rocks in California served as the location setting.

== Reception ==
Harrison's Reports described the film as "A fair Western" with "good horseback riding, plentiful fights, and fast action."

== Preservation ==
This film is preserved in the Library of Congress collection.
