= Women Go on Forever =

1931 film

- Directed by: Walter Lang
- Written by: Daniel Nathan Rubin
- Produced by: James Cruze; Samuel Zierler
- Starring: Clara Kimball Young
- Cinematography: Charles Schoenbaum
- Production company: James Cruze Productions
- Distributed by: Tiffany Studios
- Release date: August 15, 1931
- Running time: 64 minutes
- Country: United States
- Language: English

Women Go on Forever is a 1931 American pre-Code drama film directed by Walter Lang and starring Clara Kimball Young. It was written by Daniel Nathan Rubin, adapted from the 1927 play of the same name starring Mary Boland and James Cagney.

== Cast ==
- Clara Kimball Young as Daisy Bowman
- Marian Nixon as Betty
- Paul Page as Eddie
- Thomas E. Jackson as detective
- Yola d'Avril as Pearl
- Morgan Wallace as Jake
- Maurice Black as Pete
- Maurice Murphy as Tommy

== See also ==
- List of lost films
