= The Single Sin =

1931 film

- Directed by: William Nigh
- Written by: A. P. Younger; Frances Hyland
- Produced by: Phil Goldstone
- Starring: Kay Johnson; Bert Lytell; Paul Hurst
- Cinematography: Max Dupont
- Edited by: Charles Harris
- Production company: Tiffany Pictures
- Distributed by: Tiffany Pictures
- Release date: February 23, 1931
- Running time: 90 minutes
- Country: United States
- Language: English

The Single Sin is a 1931 American Pre-code drama film directed by William Nigh and starring Kay Johnson, Bert Lytell and Paul Hurst. It was produced and released by the Poverty Row company Tiffany Pictures.

== Plot ==
Struggling actress Kate Adams gets mixed up in a bootlegging racket, but is sent to jail for several months. Reforming herself she gets a job as the secretary of millionaire Roger Van Dorn, who eventually marries her. Her newfound respectability is threatened when her former partner in crime Frank Bowman is released from prison and gets a job as Van Dorn's chauffeur. He proceeds to blackmail Kate by threatening to reveal their former association.

== Cast ==
- Kay Johnson as Kate Adams
- Bert Lytell as Joe Strickland
- Paul Hurst as Slug
- Matthew Betz as Frank Bowman
- Holmes Herbert as Roger Van Dorn
- Geneva Mitchell as Marian
- Sandra Ravel as French maid
- Charles McNaughton as Butler
- Lillian Elliott as Cook
- Robert Emmett O'Connor as Detective

== Preservation status ==
- A print is held at the Library of Congress.
