= Molly and Me (1929 film) =

1929 film

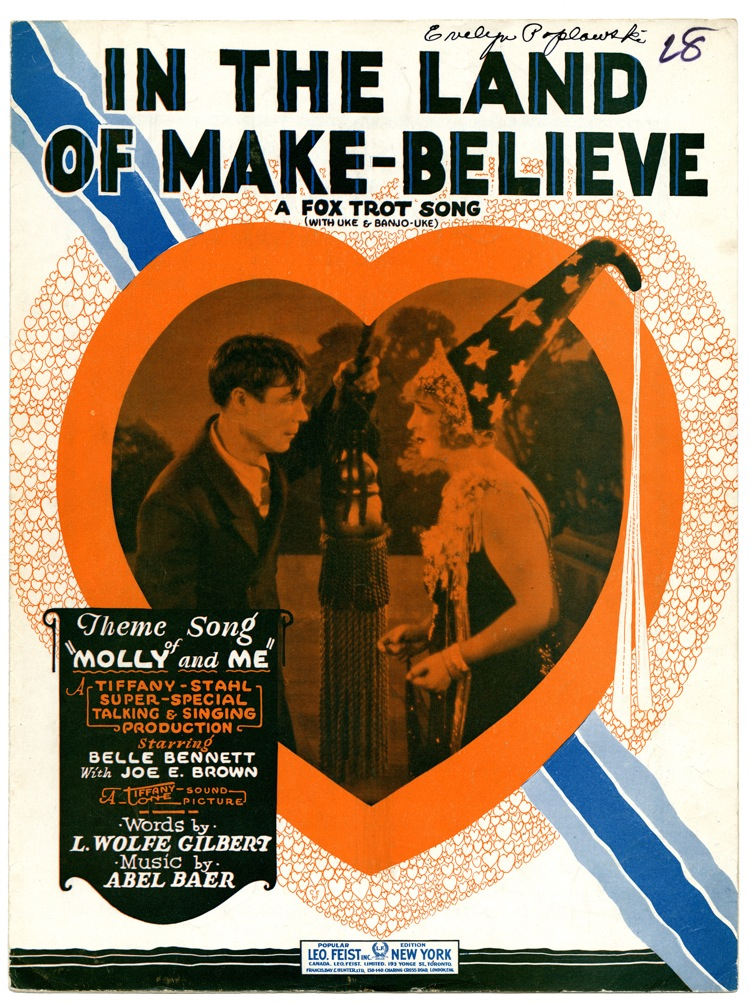
- Sheet music for the film's title song
- Directed by: Albert Ray
- Written by: Fanny Hatton; Frederic Hatton; Lois Leeson; Harry R. Durant
- Produced by: John M. Stahl
- Starring: Belle Bennett; Joe E. Brown; Alberta Vaughn
- Cinematography: Ernest Miller; Frank Zucker
- Edited by: Russell G. Shields
- Music by: Hugo Riesenfeld
- Production company: Tiffany Pictures
- Distributed by: Tiffany Pictures
- Release date: March 1, 1929
- Running time: 87 minutes
- Country: United States
- Languages: Sound (Part-Talkie); English intertitles

Molly and Me is a 1929 sound part-talkie American comedy film directed by Albert Ray. In addition to sequences with audible dialogue or talking sequences, the film features a synchronized musical score and sound effects along with English intertitles. The soundtrack was recorded using the Tiffany-Tone sound system. The film stars Belle Bennett, Joe E. Brown, and Alberta Vaughn. An incomplete copy of the film (missing one reel) survives at The Library of Congress.

== Cast ==
- Belle Bennett as Molly Wilson
- Joe E. Brown as Jim Wilson
- Alberta Vaughn as Peggy
- Charles Byer as Dan Kingsley

== Music ==
The film features a theme song entitled "In The Land Of Make Believe" which was composed by Abel Baer and L. Wolfe Gilbert.

== See also ==
- List of early sound feature films (1926–1929)

== Bibliography ==
- Pitts, Michael R. Poverty Row Studios, 1929–1940: An Illustrated History of 55 Independent Film Companies, with a Filmography for Each. McFarland & Company, 2005.
