= The Devil's Skipper =

1928 film by John G. Adolfi

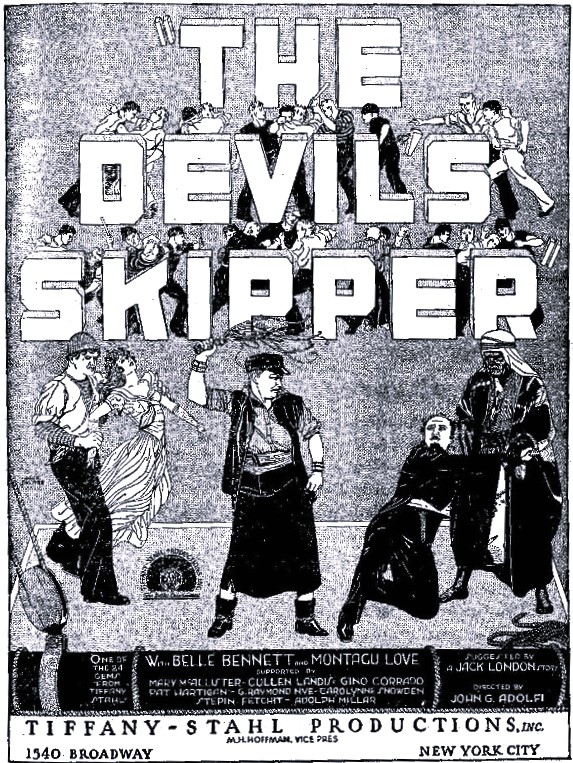
- Advertisement
- Directed by: John G. Adolfi
- Written by: Harry Braxton; Robert Dillon; Jack Natteford; Viola Brothers Shore
- Based on: "Demetrios Contos" by Jack London
- Produced by: John M. Stahl; Roy Fitzroy
- Starring: Belle Bennett; Montagu Love; Gino Corrado
- Cinematography: Ernest Miller
- Edited by: Desmond O'Brien
- Production company: Tiffany Pictures
- Distributed by: Tiffany Pictures
- Release date: February 1, 1928
- Running time: 60 minutes
- Country: United States
- Language: Silent (English intertitles)

The Devil's Skipper is a 1928 American silent drama film directed by John G. Adolfi and starring Belle Bennett, Montagu Love and Gino Corrado. It was based on a short story by Jack London.

== Cast ==
- Belle Bennett as The Devil Skipper
- Montagu Love as First Mate
- Gino Corrado as Philip La Farge
- Mary McAllister as Marie La Farge
- Cullen Landis as John Dubray
- G. Raymond Nye as Nick the Greek
- Pat Hartigan as Captain McKenna
- Adolph Milar as Mate Cornish
- Carolynne Snowden as Slave
- Stepin Fetchit as Slave's Husband

== Preservation ==
A print of The Devil's Skipper is in the collection of the Library of Congress.

== Bibliography ==
- Goble, Alan. The Complete Index to Literary Sources in Film. Walter de Gruyter, 1999.
