= The Naughty Duchess =

1928 film by Tom Terriss

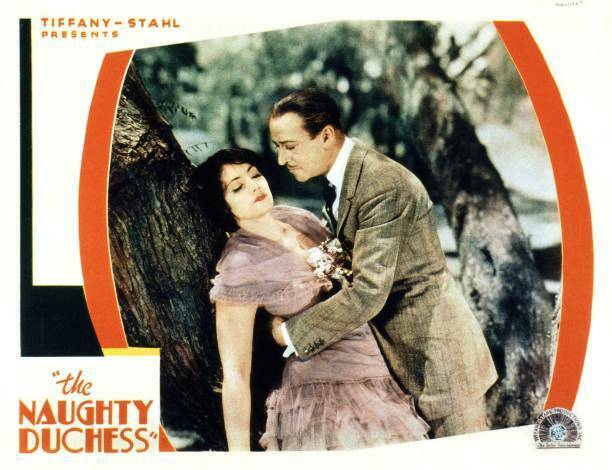
- Lobby card
- Directed by: Tom Terriss
- Based on: The Indiscretion of the Duchess; Being a Story Concerning Two Ladies, a Nobleman, and a Necklace by Anthony Hope Hawkins
- Starring: Duncan Renaldo, Eve Southern
- Cinematography: Ernest Miller, Chester A. Lyons
- Edited by: Leete Renick Brown
- Distributed by: Tiffany−Stahl Productions, Inc.
- Release date: 1928
- Running time: 60 minutes
- Country: United States
- Language: Silent (English intertitles)

The Naughty Duchess is a 1928 American silent romance film directed by Tom Terriss and written by Anthony Hope Hawkins based on his 1894 novel The Indiscretion of the Duchess: being a story concerning two ladies, a nobleman, and a necklace.

== Cast ==
- Eve Southern as Hortense
- H. B. Warner as Duke de St. Maclou
- Duncan Renaldo as Armand
- Maude Turner Gordon as Comtesse
- Gertrude Astor as Ninon
- Martha Mattox as Housekeeper
- Herbert Evans as Berensac
