= Domestic Meddlers =

1928 film

- Directed by: James Flood
- Written by: Fanny Hatton; Frederic Hatton; Wellyn Totman
- Produced by: John M. Stahl
- Starring: Claire Windsor; Lawrence Gray; Roy D'Arcy
- Cinematography: Ernest Miller
- Edited by: Byron Robinson
- Production company: Tiffany Pictures
- Distributed by: Tiffany Pictures
- Release date: August 15, 1928
- Country: United States
- Languages: Silent; English intertitles

Domestic Meddlers is a 1928 American silent comedy film directed by James Flood and starring Claire Windsor, Lawrence Gray and Roy D'Arcy.

== Cast ==
- Claire Windsor as Claire
- Lawrence Gray as Walter
- Roy D'Arcy as Lew
- Jed Prouty as Jonsey

== Bibliography ==
- Darby, William. Masters of Lens and Light: A Checklist of Major Cinematographers and Their Feature Films. Scarecrow Press, 1991.
