= Range Law (1931 film) =

1931 film by Phil Rosen

- Directed by: Phil Rosen
- Written by: Earle Snell
- Produced by: Tiffany Pictures
- Starring: Ken Maynard
- Cinematography: Arthur Reed
- Edited by: Earl Turner
- Distributed by: Tiffany Pictures
- Release date: October 11, 1931
- Running time: 63 minutes
- Country: United States
- Language: English

Range Law is a 1931 American pre-Code Western film directed by Phil Rosen and starring Ken Maynard. It was produced and distributed by Tiffany Pictures. A print is preserved in the Library of Congress collection.

== Plot ==
Imprisoned for a crime he did not commit, Connors escapes to try to find the culprit who framed him. He takes a job at a ranch whose owner is engaged to the actual villain. Connors is arrested by the sheriff but escapes again. He eventually is vindicated, and his relationship with Warren is restored.

== Cast ==
- Ken Maynard as Hap Connors
- Frances Dade as Ruth Warren
- Frank Mayo as Jim Blont
- Aileen Manning as Ruth's attendant
- Jack Rockwell as the sheriff
- Lafe McKee as Old Frisco
- Charles King as Bull Legal
- Tom London as henchman Cleve
- Tarzan as himself, Ken's horse
- Ralph Bucko as posse rider
- Roy Bucko as posse rider
- Bob Burns as townsman
- Robert Dudley as minister
- Bud McClure as posse rider
- Blackjack Ward as henchman Jack
