= Tiffany Pictures =

Defunct Hollywood motion picture studio

Tiffany Pictures (known as Tiffany-Stahl Productions from 1927 to 1930) was an American film studio in Hollywood, in operation from 1921 until 1932. It is considered a Poverty Row studio, whose films had lower budgets, lesser-known stars, and lower production values than major studios.

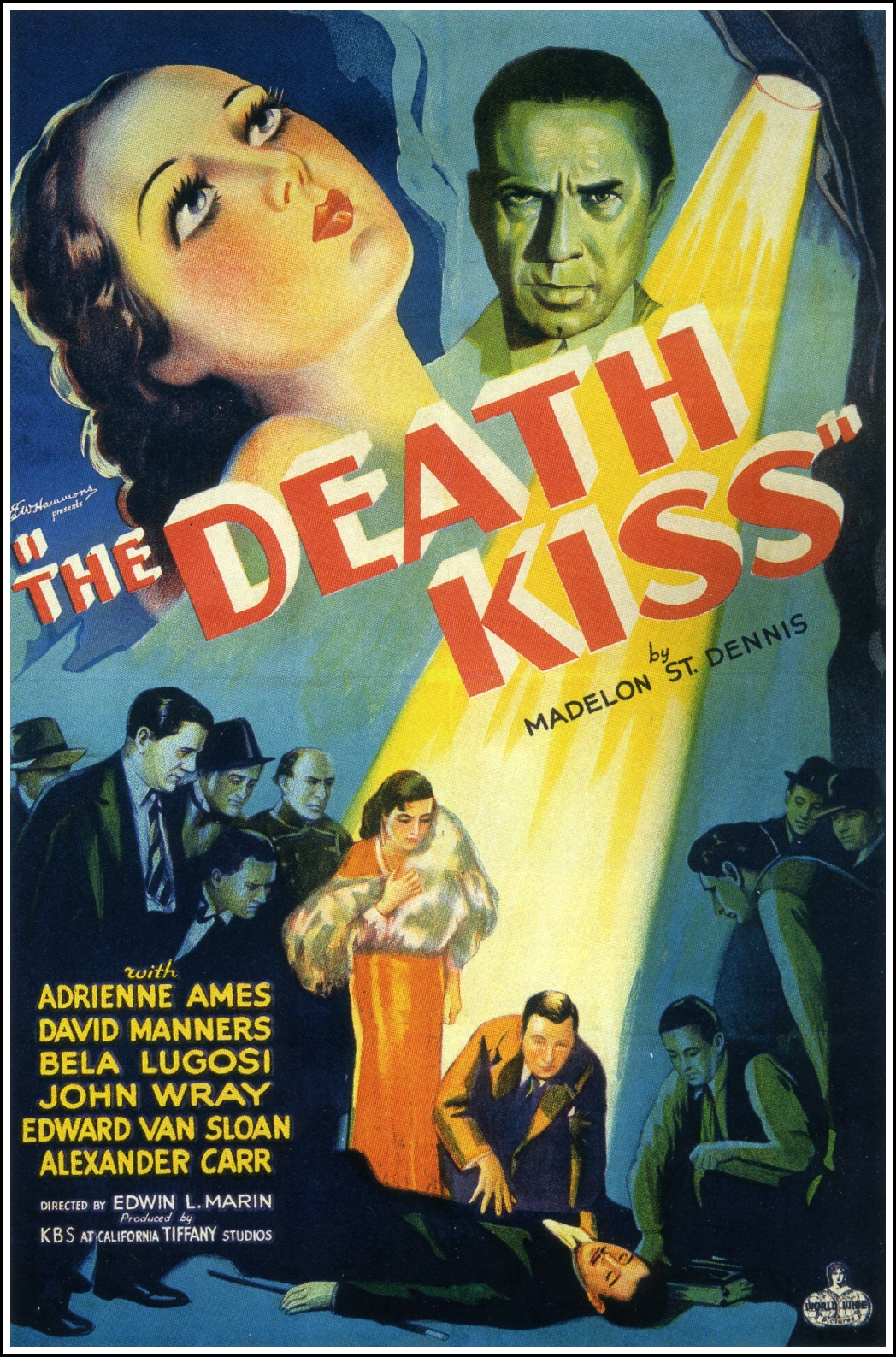
The Death Kiss (1932) produced by Tiffany Pictures, released by Sono Art-World Wide Pictures, and starring Bela Lugosi

== History ==
Tiffany Productions was a movie-making venture founded in 1921 by star Mae Murray; her then-husband, director Robert Z. Leonard; and Maurice H. Hoffman, who made eight films, all released through Metro-Goldwyn-Mayer. Murray and Leonard divorced in 1925.

Starting in 1925 with Souls for Sables, co-starring Claire Windsor and Eugene O'Brien, Tiffany released 70 features, both silent and sound, 20 of which were Westerns. At one point, Tiffany was booking its films into nearly 2,500 theatres.

To produce their films, Tiffany acquired the former Reliance-Majestic Studios lot at 4516 Sunset Boulevard, Los Angeles in 1927.

From 1927 to 1930, John M. Stahl was the director of Tiffany and renamed the company Tiffany-Stahl Productions. The head of Tiffany was Phil Goldstone, with his vice president Maurice H. Hoffman, who later was president of Liberty Films, which merged into Republic Pictures. Leonard A. Young, who ran the L.A. Young Spring and Wire Company, bought into Tiffany from Hoffman in 1929.

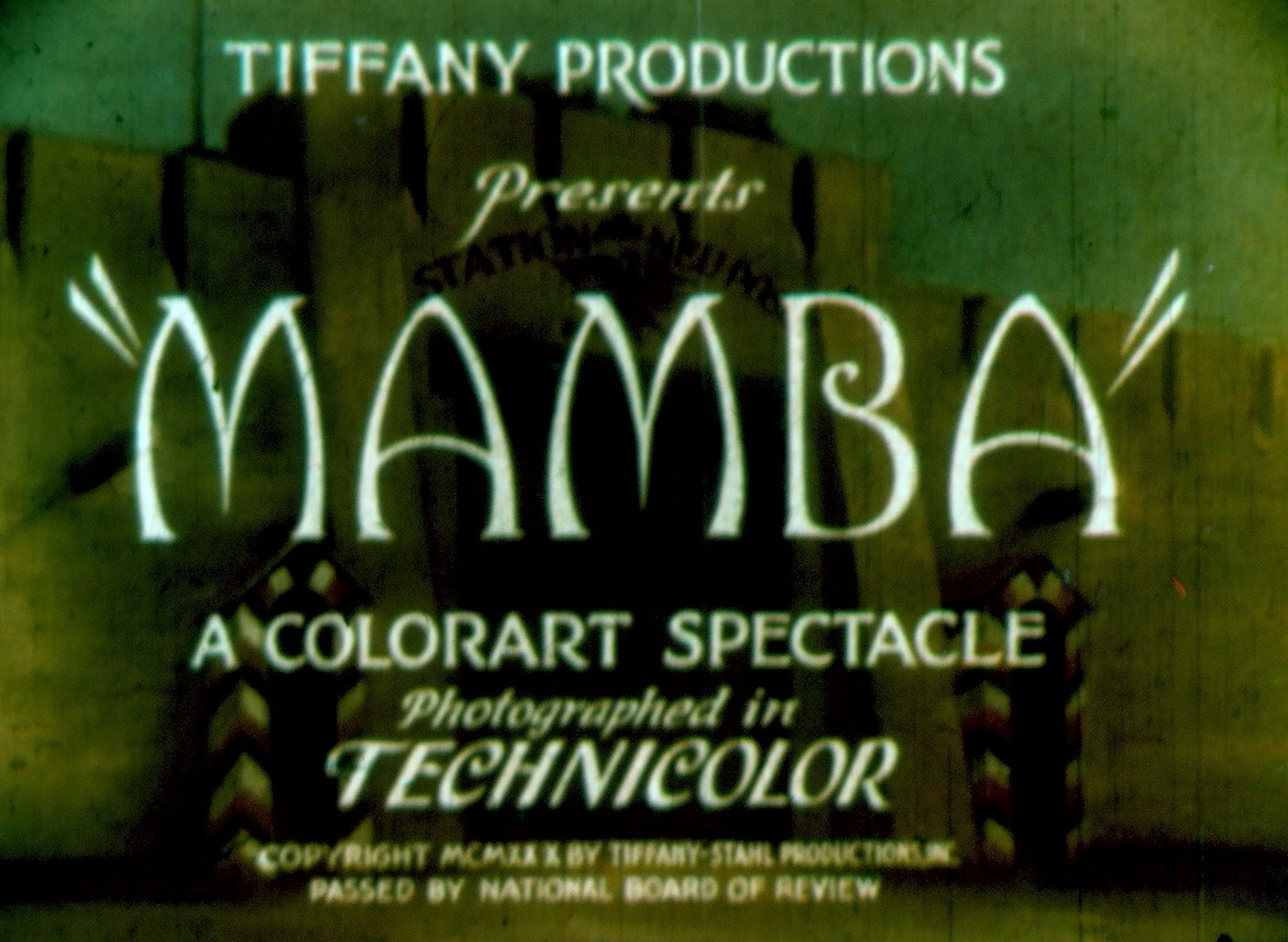
Title card for Mamba (1930)

Tiffany lacked a profitable distribution network. The company filed for bankruptcy in 1932. As a result, it was absorbed into the short-lived Sono Art company, which handled its remaining releases.

Copyrights on most (if not all) of Tiffany's films were not renewed, and the films are now in the public domain.

The studio complex was later bought by Columbia Pictures and given to Sam Katzman and Irving Briskin as a base of operations for their film units. Metro-Goldwyn-Mayer purchased Tiffany's nitrate original film negative library and burned the collection during the burning of Atlanta sequence in Gone with the Wind.

In January 2012, the Vitaphone Project announced that the U.S. premiere of a restored print of Mamba would be in March 2012 at Cinefest in Syracuse, New York.

== Partial list of Tiffany films ==
Some of Tiffany's later movies, such as The Death Kiss (1932), were released by Sono Art-World Wide Pictures. Among the films produced by Tiffany were:

- Peacock Alley (1922)
- Broadway Rose (1922)
- Fascination (1922)
- The French Doll (1923)
- Fashion Row (1923)
- Jazzmania (1923)
- Mademoiselle Midnight (1924)
- Circe, the Enchantress (1924)
- Borrowed Finery (1925)
- Morals for Men (1925)
- Fools of Fashion (1926)
- Lost at Sea (1926)
- Josselyn's Wife (1926)
- Pleasures of the Rich (1926)
- That Model from Paris (1926)
- College Days (1926)
- Out of the Storm (1926)
- Cheaters (1927)
- The Princess from Hoboken (1927)
- The Haunted Ship (1927)
- Snowbound (1927)
- Once and Forever (1927)
- Streets of Shanghai (1927)
- Husband Hunters (1927)
- The Cavalier (1928), starring Richard Talmadge
- A Woman Against the World (1928)
- Marriage by Contract (1928)
- Clothes Make the Woman (1928), starring Eve Southern (under the Tiffany-Stahl banner)
- The Grain of Dust (1928)
- The Scarlet Dove (1928)
- Nameless Men (1928)
- Tropical Nights (1928)
- Green Grass Widows (1928)
- Prowlers of the Sea (1928)
- The Albany Night Boat (1928)
- Their Hour (1928)
- The Naughty Duchess (1928)
- The Devil's Skipper (1928)
- Domestic Meddlers (1928)
- Border Romance (1929)
- Molly and Me (1929)
- Mister Antonio (1929)
- Broadway Fever (1929)
- Midstream (1929)
- New Orleans (1929)
- The Devil's Apple Tree (1929)
- Whispering Winds (1929)
- Two Men and a Maid (1929)
- The Rainbow (1929)
- Lucky Boy (1929)
- The Spirit of Youth (1929)
- My Lady's Past (1929)
- The Lost Zeppelin (1929), an early Antarctic disaster film
- Extravagance (1930), with June Collyer
- Journey's End (1930), the first film directed by James Whale
- Kathleen Mavourneen (1930)
- The Love Trader (1930)
- She Got What She Wanted (1930)
- The Swellhead (1930)
- Hot Curves (1930)
- Paradise Island (1930)
- Borrowed Wives (1930)
- Peacock Alley (1930)
- Troopers Three (1930)
- Party Girl (1930)
- Oklahoma Cyclone (1930)
- Sunny Skies (1930)
- The Third Alarm (1930)
- Mamba (1930), claimed to be the first full-Technicolor drama
- The Medicine Man (1930), starring Jack Benny
- Near the Rainbow's End (1930), with Bob Steele and Louise Lorraine
- Branded Men (1931)
- Caught Cheating (1931)
- Morals for Women (1931)
- Arizona Terror (1931)
- The Drums of Jeopardy (1931)
- Salvation Nell (1931), directed by James Cruze
- X Marks the Spot (1931), starring Lew Cody and Sally Blane
- Murder at Midnight (1931)
- Range Law (1931)
- The Single Sin (1931)
- The Nevada Buckaroo (1931)
- Women Go on Forever (1931)
- The Death Kiss (1932), starring Bela Lugosi, David Manners, and Edward Van Sloan, filmed on location at Tiffany Studios and one of the last films made at Tiffany
- Sunset Trail (1932)
- Lena Rivers (1932)
- Texas Gun Fighter (1932)
- Hell Fire Austin (1932)
- Strangers of the Evening (1932)
- The Man Called Back (1932)
- Hotel Continental (1932)
- A series of eight films featuring and produced by movie star Mae Murray
- Eight singing cowboy Westerns starring Bob Steele
- Ten Westerns starring Ken Maynard
- A series of short subjects called The Voice of Hollywood
- A series of short subject comedies featuring voices dubbed over chimps chewing bubble gum, produced by Jack White

They were sued by Tiffany & Co. for trademark infringement, as they used slogans such as "Another Gem from Tiffany".
