= Ted McCord (cinematographer) =

American cinematographer

Ted McCord, A.S.C.
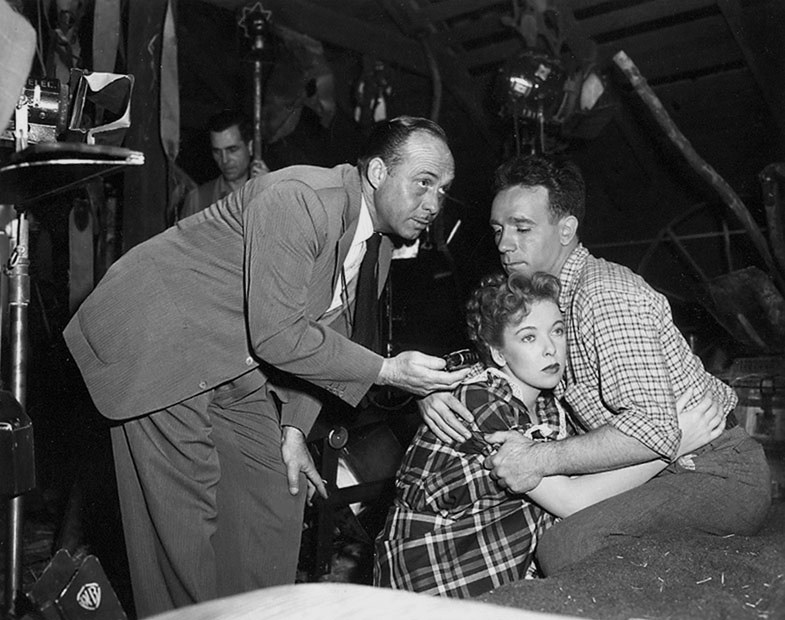
- McCord (left) filming Deep Valley, 1947
- Born: Thamer D. McCord; August 2, 1900; Sullivan County, Indiana, U.S.
- Died: January 19, 1976 (aged 75); Glendale, California, U.S.
- Occupation: Cinematographer
- Years active: 1921–1966

Ted McCord, A.S.C. (August 2, 1900 – January 19, 1976) was an American cinematographer.

== Biography ==
Born in Sullivan County, Indiana, McCord received three Academy Award nominations. The first two Johnny Belinda (1948) and Two for the Seesaw (1962) were for black-and white cinematography, and the third The Sound of Music (1965) was for color.

McCord died of cancer in Glendale, California at the age of 75. He is interred at Glendale's Forest Lawn Memorial Park.

== Selected filmography ==
Year	Film	Director
1921	Sacred and Profane Love	William D. Taylor
1930	The Fighting Legion	Harry Joe Brown
1930	Sons of the Saddle	Harry Joe Brown
1931	Freighters of Destiny	Fred Allen
1933	Somewhere in Sonora	Mack V. Wright
1936	Senor Jim	Jacques Jaccard
1943	Action in the North Atlantic	Lloyd Bacon
1947	Deep Valley	Jean Negulesco
1948	The Treasure of the Sierra Madre	John Huston
1948	Johnny Belinda	Jean Negulesco
1948	June Bride	Bretaigne Windust
1949	Flamingo Road	Michael Curtiz
1949	The Lady Takes a Sailor	Michael Curtiz
1950	Young Man with a Horn	Michael Curtiz
1950	The Damned Don't Cry	Vincent Sherman
1950	The Breaking Point	Michael Curtiz
1951	Goodbye, My Fancy	Vincent Sherman
1951	Force of Arms	Michael Curtiz
1951	I'll See You in My Dreams	Michael Curtiz
1956	East of Eden	Elia Kazan
1957	The Helen Morgan Story	Michael Curtiz
1958	The Proud Rebel	Michael Curtiz
1959	The Hanging Tree	Delmer Daves
1960	The Adventures of Huckleberry Finn	Michael Curtiz
1962	Two for the Seesaw	Robert Wise
1962	Smog	Franco Rossi
1965	The Sound of Music	Robert Wise
1966	A Fine Madness	Irvin Kershner

- Man From 1997 (1956 television anthology episode)

== Oscar nominations ==
- 1966: Best Cinematography, Color for The Sound of Music
- 1963: Best Cinematography, Black-and-White for Two for the Seesaw
- 1948: Best Cinematography, Black-and-White for Johnny Belinda
