= Peacock Alley =

Peacock Alley may refer to:

- Peacock Alley (1921 film), a black-and-white silent film
- Peacock Alley (1930 film), a black-and-white sound film
- Peacock Alley (connection), the connection between Waldorf and Astoria in The Waldorf-Astoria Hotel and the name of a restaurant there
- Peacock Alley (jazz club), one of St. Louis's most important jazz clubs in the 1950s
- Peacock Alley (restaurant), former Michelin-starred restaurant in Ireland
- Peacock Alley (room), a room in Windsor Hotel, Montreal
