= Jazzmania =

1923 film by Robert Zigler Leonard

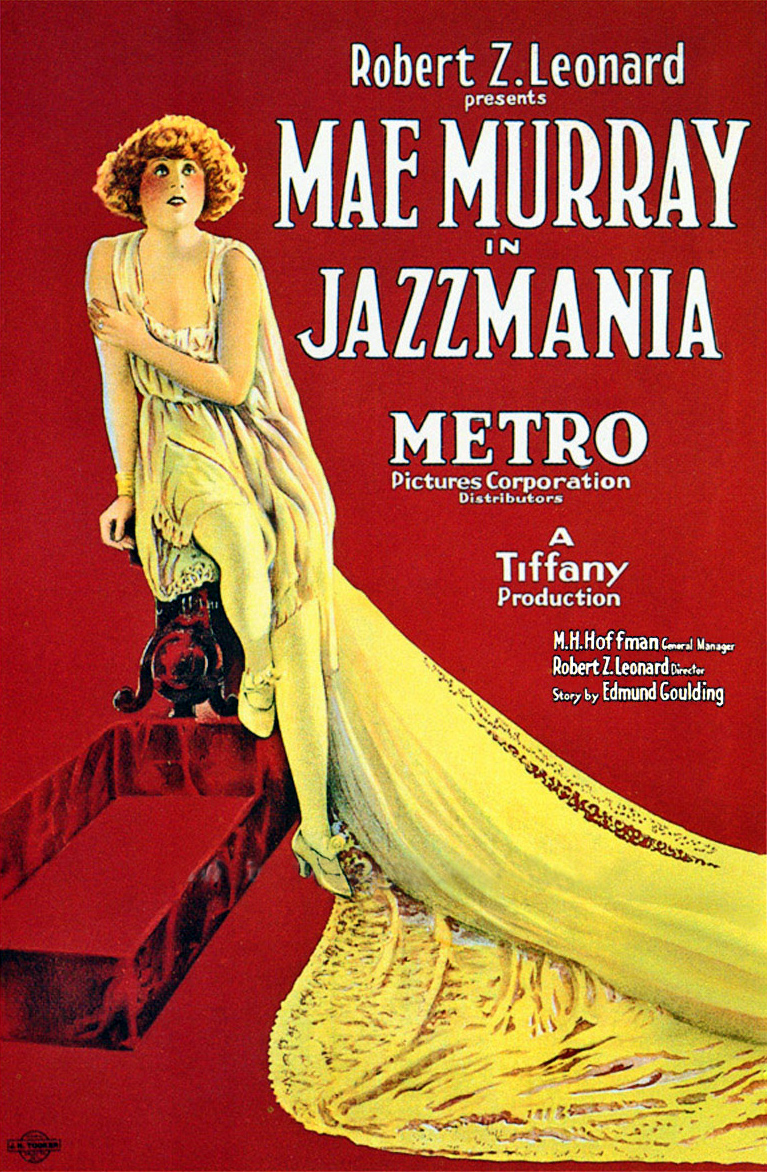
- Film poster
- Directed by: Robert Z. Leonard
- Written by: Alfred A. Cohn (titles)
- Screenplay by: Edmund Goulding
- Story by: Edmund Goulding
- Starring: Mae Murray; Rod La Rocque; Jean Hersholt; Lionel Belmore
- Cinematography: Oliver T. Marsh
- Production company: Tiffany Pictures
- Distributed by: Metro Pictures
- Release date: February 12, 1923
- Running time: 80 minutes
- Country: United States
- Language: Silent (English intertitles)

Jazzmania is a 1923 American silent drama film directed by Robert Z. Leonard and starring his then-wife Mae Murray. In keeping with Murray's previous films and a few of her succeeding films, the movie possesses some of the most provocative attire worn by an actress in film up to that time. As with Fascination, Edmund Goulding wrote the original screen story and screenplay.

== Cast ==
- Mae Murray as Ninon
- Rod La Rocque as Jerry Langdon
- Robert Frazer as Captain Valmar
- Edmund Burns as Sonny Daimler
- Jean Hersholt as Prince Otto of Como
- Lionel Belmore as Baron Bolo
- Edith Bostwick as Marline
- Wilfred Lucas as Julius Furman
- J. Herbert Frank as Colonel Kerr
- Carl Harbaugh as Ganova
- Harry Northrup as American Capitalist
- Tom Guise as General Muroff
- Harry Barrows as August Daimler

== Preservation ==
A print of Jazzmania is in the collection of the George Eastman Museum.
