= The Big Little Person =

1919 film by Robert Zigler Leonard

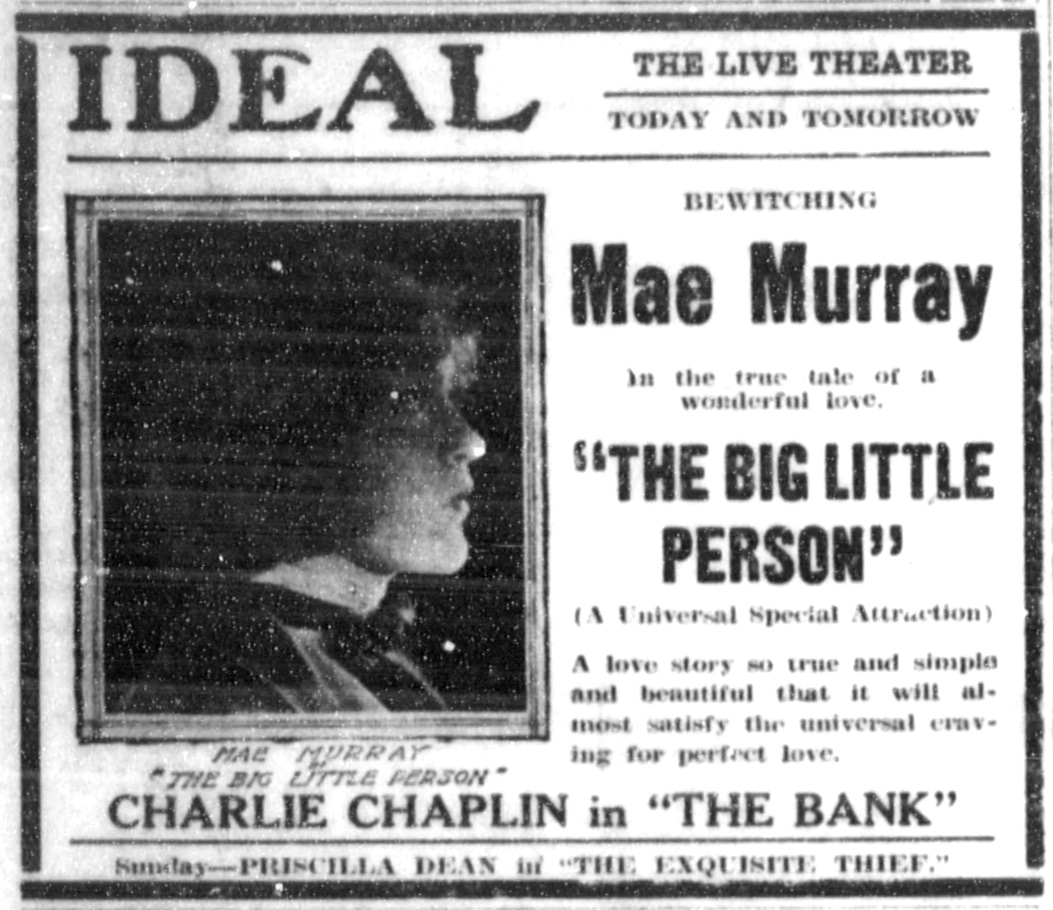
- Newspaper advertisement.
- Directed by: Robert Z. Leonard
- Written by: Bess Meredyth
- Based on: The Big Little Person by Rebecca Lane Hooper Eastman
- Produced by: Carl Laemmle
- Starring: Mae Murray; M. Rodolpho De Valentina
- Distributed by: Universal Pictures
- Release date: May 1919
- Running time: 6 reels
- Country: United States
- Languages: Silent film English intertitles

The Big Little Person is a lost 1919 American silent romantic drama film produced and distributed by Universal Pictures. Based on the novel of the same name by Rebecca Lane Hooper Eastman, the film was directed by Robert Z. Leonard and starred his then-wife and muse Mae Murray. Rudolph Valentino, who was credited as M. Rodolpho De Valentina, had a supporting role.

== Cast ==
- Mae Murray as Arathea Manning
- Clarissa Selwynne as Mrs. Manning
- M. Rodolpho De Valentina as Arthur Endicott
- Allan Sears as Gerald Staples
- Mrs. Bertram Grassby as Marion Beemis

== Preservation ==
With no holdings located in archives, The Big Little Person is considered a lost film.
