= The Bride's Awakening =

1918 film by Robert Zigler Leonard

- Directed by: Robert Z. Leonard
- Written by: F. McGrew Willis (scenario)
- Produced by: Carl Laemmle
- Starring: Mae Murray
- Cinematography: Fred LeRoy Granville
- Distributed by: Universal Film Manufacturing Company
- Release date: May 5, 1918
- Running time: 60 minutes
- Country: United States
- Language: Silent (English intertitles)

The Bride's Awakening is a 1918 American silent drama film released by Universal Pictures and produced by their Bluebird production unit. Robert Z. Leonard directed the film and his then-wife Mae Murray was the star. A print of the film is housed at the EYE Institute Nederlands.

== Plot ==
As described in a film magazine, believing he loves her, Elaine Bronson (Murray) at the death of her uncle marries Richard Earle (Cody). Before long, she discovers that he is more interested in her fortune, and so she accepts the attentions of Jimmy Newton (Dearholt). Richard has been having an affair with a married woman but tires of her, and comes to appreciate the beauty of his wife. However, she will have nothing to do with him. The other woman comes back to Richard and, when she finds out about his marriage, she kills him, leaving Elaine and Jimmy free to pursue their happiness.

== Cast ==
- Mae Murray as Elaine Bronson
- Lew Cody as Richard Earle
- Clarissa Selwynne as Lucille Bennett
- Harry Carter as George Bennett
- Joseph W. Girard as Frederick Bronson
- Ashton Dearholt as Jimmy Newton

== Reception ==
Like many American films of the time, The Bride's Awakening was subject to cuts by city and state film censorship boards. For example, the Chicago Board of Censors issued an Adults Only permit for the film. On a re-review, the Chicago board cut, in Reel 1, the entire incident of married woman in man's room and all intertitles pertinent to same, Reel 3, the two intertitles "We've had much wine — let's have some wild women" and "I'll go and call some up on the telephone", Reel 4, husband locking door of wife's room, two closeups of man's face as he comes towards his wife, all scenes of husband advancing towards wife and wife shrinking against wall of room, the intertitle "I always thought of you as a child", all except first struggle scene of couple, Reel 5, two intertitles "Dear boy — come to me" and "I sent for you tonight", and, Reel 6, woman shooting man.
