= The Sea Urchin (1913 film) =

1913 film

- Directed by: Edwin August
- Written by: Jeanie MacPherson
- Starring: Jeanie MacPherson; Lon Chaney
- Distributed by: Universal Film Manufacturing Company
- Release date: August 22, 1913
- Running time: 1 reel
- Country: United States
- Language: Silent with English intertitles

The Sea Urchin is a 1913 American silent short romantic drama film directed by Edwin August and starring Jeanie MacPherson and Lon Chaney. The film was the earliest known character role by Lon Chaney and the first screenplay by MacPherson. The story follows a hunchback fisherman who finds a young girl and raises her into womanhood with the intention of marrying her. The film was released on August 22, 1913, and was played across the United States. The film is presumed lost.

== Plot ==
A hunchback fisherman named Barnacle Bill finds a young girl tied to a mast, the sole survivor of a shipwreck, and raises her into womanhood with the intention of making her his wife. Ten years pass and the woman, out of gratitude, promises to marry him. The hunchback hires a handsome stranger named Bob. The boy and the girl fall in love, but the girl refuses to marry him. The hunchback sees the two embrace and threatens Bob with a knife.

The next day, the three go fishing in the boat and an argument breaks out. During the argument, the boat tips over and the girl is washed away. The hunchback and the boy search for her, until the boy becomes exhausted and collapses on the shore. The hunchback finds the girl on a rock and brings her ashore. When the two young people reunite, he sees how happy they are together and decides to walk out of their lives. (Note: Due to the lack of a detailed synopsis for the film in trade publications, several different sources give conflicting accounts of the plot. Michael Blake's book, The Films of Lon Chaney, does not cover the young girl having been initially saved by Barnacle Bill and the promise to marry him comes after almost drowning. Jon Mirsalis's website reflects a more detailed account which is in alignment with contemporary publications, that the hunchback fisherman rescues the child from the sea and raises her up with hope that he will take her as his wife. For this reason, Miralis's plot summary is used and not Michael Blake's.)

== Cast ==
- Jeanie MacPherson as The Girl
- Lon Chaney as Barnacle Bill / Barnacle Ben, (a hunchbacked fisherman)
- Robert Z. Leonard as The Boy / Bob

== Production ==
The film was a Powers Picture Plays directed by Edwin August and distributed by the Universal Film Manufacturing Company. The film's production number was 0101. The screen play was written by Jeanie MacPherson who also played the role of The Girl. Simon Louvish, author of Cecil B. DeMille: A Life in Art, states this uncredited screenplay was the first one to be authored by MacPherson. Louvish also refers to this film as a two-reeler. Lon Chaney and Robert Z. Leonard had previously worked together for the Ferris Hartman Troupe. Three years prior to the release of the film, the two were involved in the production of musical comedies for the Troupe. In 1918, Leonard would later direct his wife, Mae Murray, and Lon Chaney in Danger, Go Slow.

== Release and legacy ==
The film was released on August 22, 1913. The Moving Picture World said the film was a memorable offering that contained vivid scenes along a picturesque coast. In an advertisement in Rushville, Indiana the film as billed as the "story of a Hunchback's Love and Renunciation". The film was also advertised, perhaps alternatively or erroneously, as Sea Urchins. Advertisements for the film included theaters in Pennsylvania, Texas, Kansas, Louisiana, Indiana, Utah, and New York.

The film is important as the first known character role by Lon Chaney. Martin F. Norden, author of The Cinema of Isolation: A History of Physical Disability in the Movies, describes the plot as following the prevailing industry standards of disabled characters, where the figure "nobly" withdraws from the relationship after plotting revenge and then saving his beloved. (Note: Norden's work uses a version of the plot that is likely identical to the one Blake includes in The Films of Lon Chaney. Instead of raising the woman up with the intention to marry, the decision is thrust out and quickly discarded after what would be the second rescue by the hunchback fisherman. For this reason, this aspect of the analysis is not mentioned. The difference does not negatively impact or compromise Norden's analysis.) Norden cites a quote from Chaney, saying this film made Chaney realize that "the screen was more interesting than the stage". The film is now considered lost. It is unknown when the film was lost, but if it was in Universal's vaults it would have been deliberately destroyed along with the remaining copies of Universal's silent era films in 1948.
