= At First Sight (1917 film) =

1917 American film directed by Robert Zigler Leonard

- Directed by: Robert Z. Leonard
- Screenplay by: George Middleton
- Starring: Mae Murray; Sam Hardy; Jules Raucourt; Julia Bruns; William T. Carleton; Nellie Lindrith
- Cinematography: Charles Rosher
- Production company: Famous Players Film Company
- Distributed by: Paramount Pictures
- Release date: July 2, 1917
- Running time: 50 minutes
- Country: United States
- Language: Silent (English intertitles)

At First Sight is a lost 1917 American silent comedy film directed by Robert Z. Leonard and written by George Middleton. The film stars Mae Murray, Sam Hardy, Jules Raucourt, Julia Bruns, William T. Carleton, and Nellie Lindrith. The film was released on July 2, 1917, by Paramount Pictures.

== Cast ==
- Mae Murray as Justina
- Sam Hardy as Hartly Poole
- Jules Raucourt as Paul
- Julia Bruns as Nell
- William T. Carleton as Mr. Chaffin
- Nellie Lindrith as Mrs. chaffin
- William J. Butler as The Sheriff
- Eddie Sturgis as The Deputy
- Estar Banks
- Charles Ogle

== Preservation ==
With no holdings located in archives, At First Sight is considered a lost film.
