= Her Body in Bond =

1918 silent film

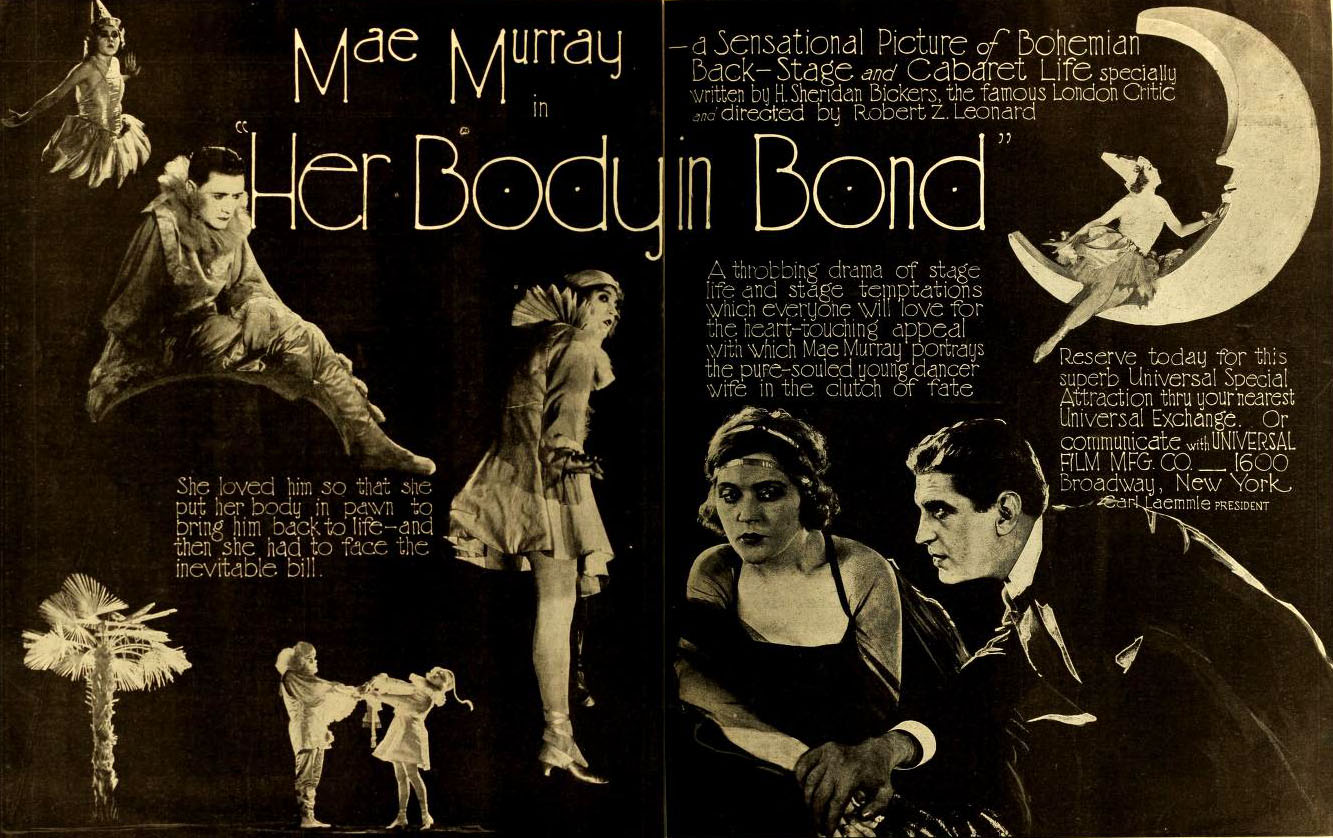
- Directed by: Robert Z. Leonard
- Written by: H. Sheridan Bickers
- Starring: Mae Murray; Kenneth Harlan; Alan Roscoe
- Cinematography: Fred LeRoy Granville
- Production company: Universal Pictures
- Distributed by: Universal Pictures
- Release date: June 16, 1918
- Running time: 60 minutes
- Country: United States
- Languages: Silent; English intertitles

Her Body in Bond is a lost 1918 American silent drama film directed by Robert Z. Leonard and starring Mae Murray, Kenneth Harlan and Alan Roscoe.

== Plot ==
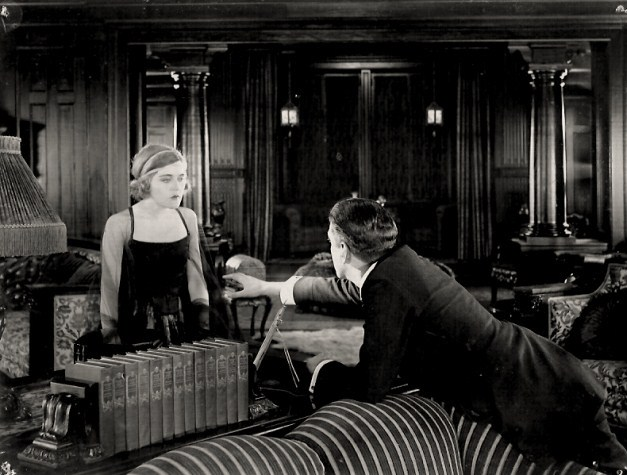
Mae Murray and Alan Roscoe in Her Body in Bond

Peggy and Joe Blondin are husband and wife who show their dancing number in New York cabarets. Sick of tuberculosis, however, Joe is forced to leave for the West for treatment, leaving his wife alone. Now she must also work to pay for her husband's care, with his demands for money ever increasing, so much so that the situation leads to despair. In reality, Joe's correspondence is intercepted by Harlan Quinn, a millionaire who has sights on Peggy: the man rewrites the letters by falsifying their contents. After one particularly alarming letter, Peggy accepts an appointment with Harlan who promises his financial help in return. But before the man manages to win the favors of the dancer, Joe arrives in New York, fully healed. The two men have a fight in which Peggy's stepfather, a drug addict who has been tricked by Harlan, intervenes and shoots the millionaire. The police shoot in turn, killing the old man.

== Cast ==
- Mae Murray as Peggy Blondin / Pierrette
- Kenneth Harlan as Joe Blondin / Pierrot
- Alan Roscoe as Harlan Quinn / Harlequin
- Joseph W. Girard as Benjamin Sleeth
- Paul Weigel as Emmett Gibson
- Maie B. Havey as Betty Coates

== Production ==
The film was produced by the Universal Film Manufacturing Company under the title 'The Eternal Columbine'. The title was changed to 'The Morals of an Actress' prior to release.

== Preservation ==
With no holdings located in archives, Her Body in Bond is considered a lost film.

== Bibliography ==
- Cooper C. Graham & Christoph Irmscher. Love and Loss in Hollywood: Florence Deshon, Max Eastman, and Charlie Chaplin. Indiana University Press, 2021.
