= Face Value (1918 film) =

1918 film by Robert Zigler Leonard

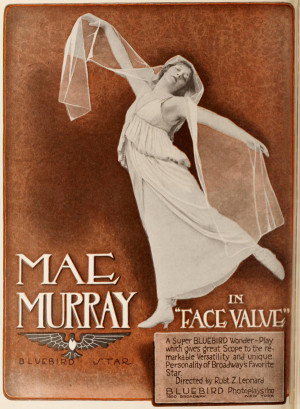
- Directed by: Robert Z. Leonard
- Written by: Mae Murray (story); Robert Z. Leonard; Fred Myton (scenario)
- Produced by: Bluebird Photoplays
- Starring: Mae Murray
- Cinematography: Alfred Gosden
- Distributed by: Universal Film Manufacturing Company
- Release date: January 19, 1918
- Running time: 5 reels
- Country: United States
- Language: Silent (English intertitles)

Face Value is a 1918 American silent drama film starring Mae Murray and directed by Robert Z. Leonard. It was released by Universal Film and produced by their second tier production unit Bluebird.

This film survives with a copy in the George Eastman Museum Motion Picture Collection.

== Plot ==
As described in a film magazine, Joan, a waif that was adopted by the keeper of a boarding house, runs away and becomes a cashier at a Childs Restaurant, but quits when the manager attempts to have sex with her. She meets Louie, with whom she was once friendly, and he forces her to steal for him. She is caught and sentenced to a state reformatory. En route she escapes from the train by jumping into a stream and swims ashore, where she is picked up by Bertram, the son of wealthy parents. He takes her home and she is permitted to stay there. Louie tries several times to get Joan under his power, but fails. Bertram marries Joan despite her past.

== Cast ==
- Mae Murray as Joan Darby
- Clarissa Selwynne as Mrs. Van Twiller
- Florence Carpenter as Margaret Van Twiller
- Wheeler Oakman as Bertram Van Twiller
- Casson Ferguson as Louis Maguire
- Mrs. Griffith as Mrs. Kelly

== Reception ==
Like many American films of the time, Face Value was subject to cuts by city and state film censorship boards. For example, the Chicago Board of Censors required a cut of the young woman coming from behind the post and fainting in a man's arms and the man stealing a pocketbook.
