= Broadway Rose (film) =

1922 film by Robert Zigler Leonard

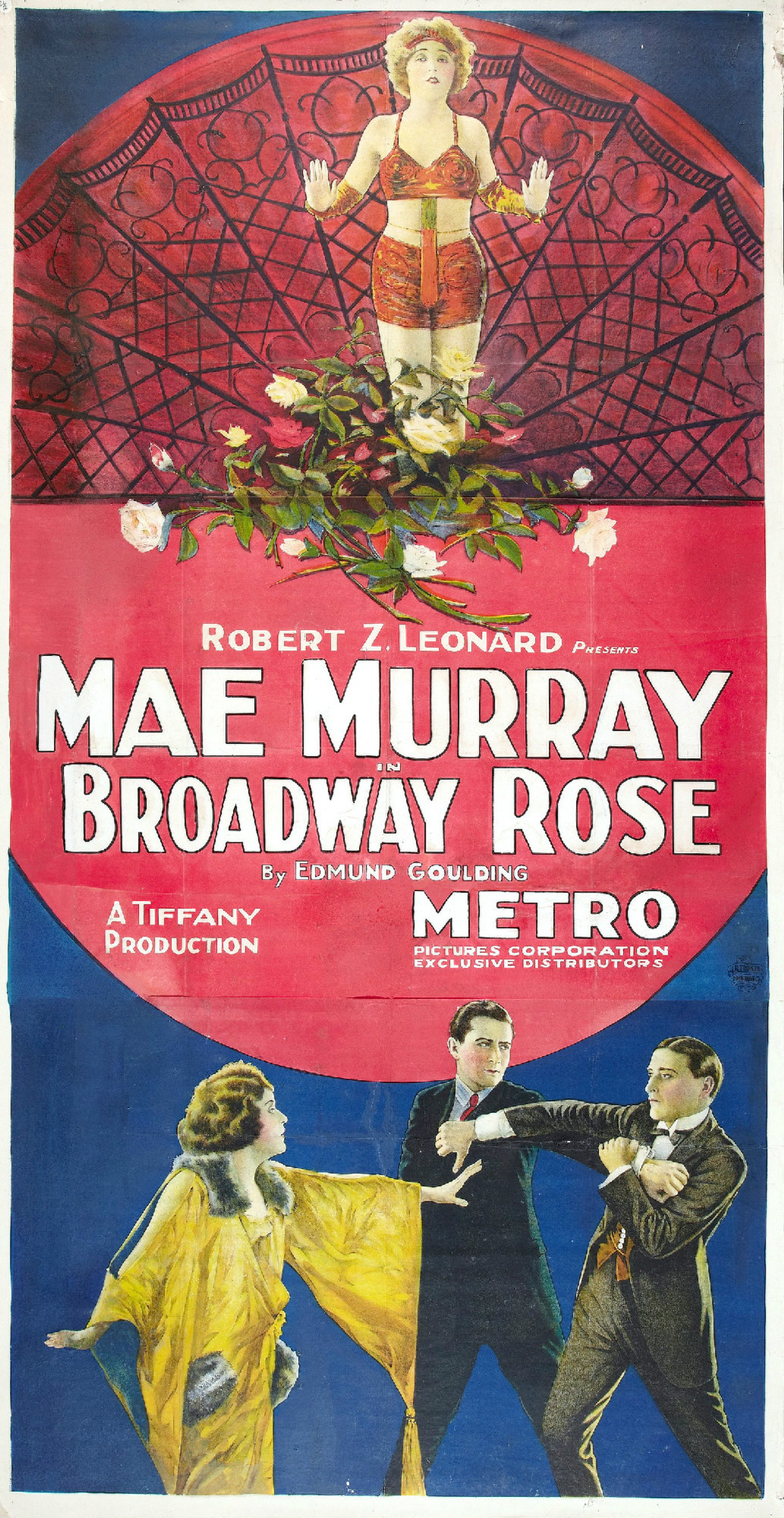
- Film poster
- Directed by: Robert Z. Leonard
- Screenplay by: Edmund Goulding
- Story by: Edmund Goulding
- Starring: Mae Murray; Monte Blue
- Cinematography: Oliver T. Marsh
- Production company: Tiffany Pictures
- Distributed by: Metro Pictures
- Release date: September 25, 1922
- Running time: 60 minutes
- Country: United States
- Language: Silent (English intertitles)

Broadway Rose is a 1922 American silent romantic drama film released by Metro Pictures and directed by Robert Z. Leonard. It stars Leonard's then-wife Mae Murray and Monte Blue. The film is based on an original story by Edmund Goulding written for star Murray, and was produced by Leonard's and Murray's production company Tiffany Pictures.

== Cast ==
- Mae Murray as Rosalie Lawrence
- Monte Blue as Tom Darcy
- Raymond Bloomer as Hugh Thompson
- Ward Crane as Reggie Whitley
- Alma Tell as Barbara Royce
- Charles Lane as Peter Thompson
- Maude Turner Gordon as Mrs. Peter Thompson
- Jane Jennings as Mrs. Lawrence
- Pauline Dempsey as Maid

== Censorship ==
Before Broadway Rose could be exhibited in Kansas, the Kansas Board of Review required the elimination of a scene where a woman is smoking.

== Preservation ==
Prints of Broadway Rose are maintained at the George Eastman Museum and Gosfilmofond in Moscow.
