= On Record (film) =

1917 film by Robert Zigler Leonard

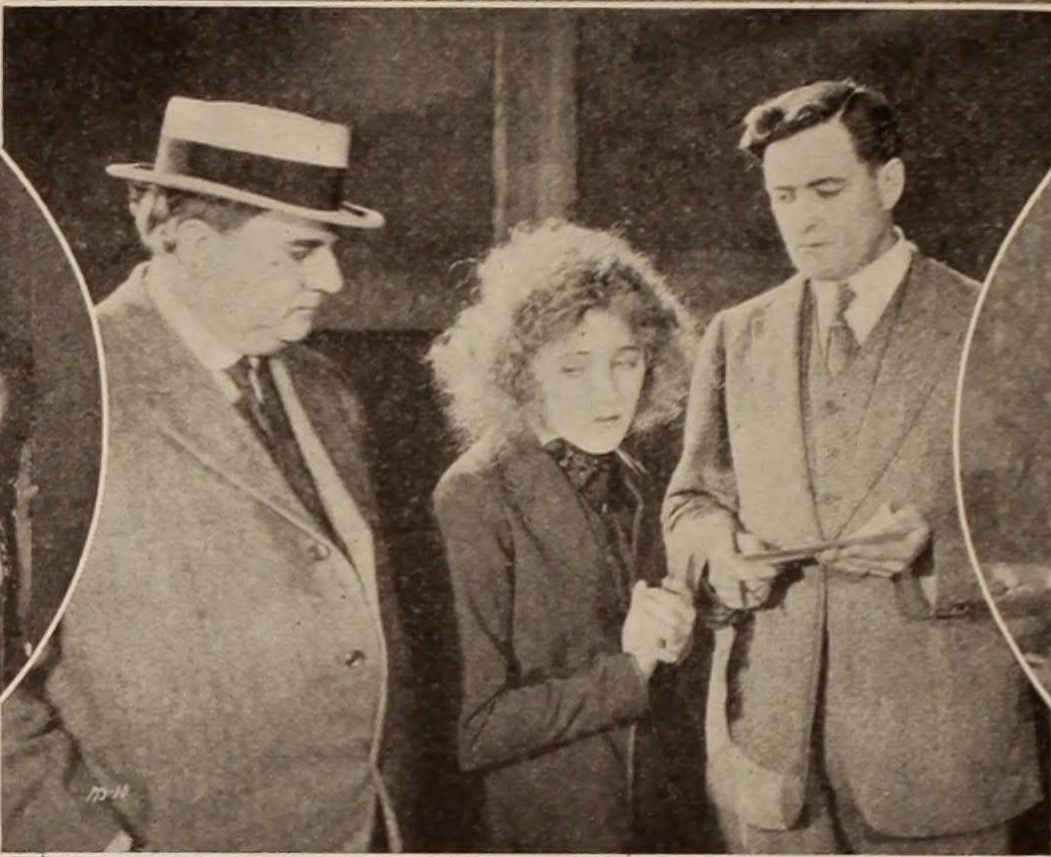
- Directed by: Robert Z. Leonard
- Written by: George D. Proctor (scenario)
- Story by: John B. Clymer; Paul West
- Produced by: Jesse Lasky
- Starring: Mae Murray
- Cinematography: Charles G. Rosher
- Distributed by: Paramount Pictures
- Release date: February 22, 1917
- Running time: 5 reels
- Country: United States
- Languages: Silent; English intertitles

On Record is a lost 1917 American silent crime drama film starring Mae Murray and directed by Murray's then-husband Robert Z. Leonard. Based on a story by John B. Clymer and Paul West, the film's scenario was written by George D. Proctor. On Record was produced by Jesse Lasky's production company, Jesse L. Lasky Feature Play Company and was distributed by Paramount Pictures.

== Cast ==
- Mae Murray - Helen Wayne
- Tom Forman - Rand Calder
- Henry A. Barrows - Martin Ingleton
- Charles Ogle - Frederick Manson
- Louis Morrison - Detective Dunn
- Bliss Chevalier - Mrs. Calder
- Gertrude Maitland - Mary Ingleton
- Lucien Littlefield (uncredited)
- Mrs. Lewis McCord (uncredited)
- Jane Wolfe (uncredited)

== Preservation ==
With no holdings listed in archives, On Record is considered a lost film.
