= Mae Murray =

Actress, dancer, film producer, screenwriter (1885–1965)

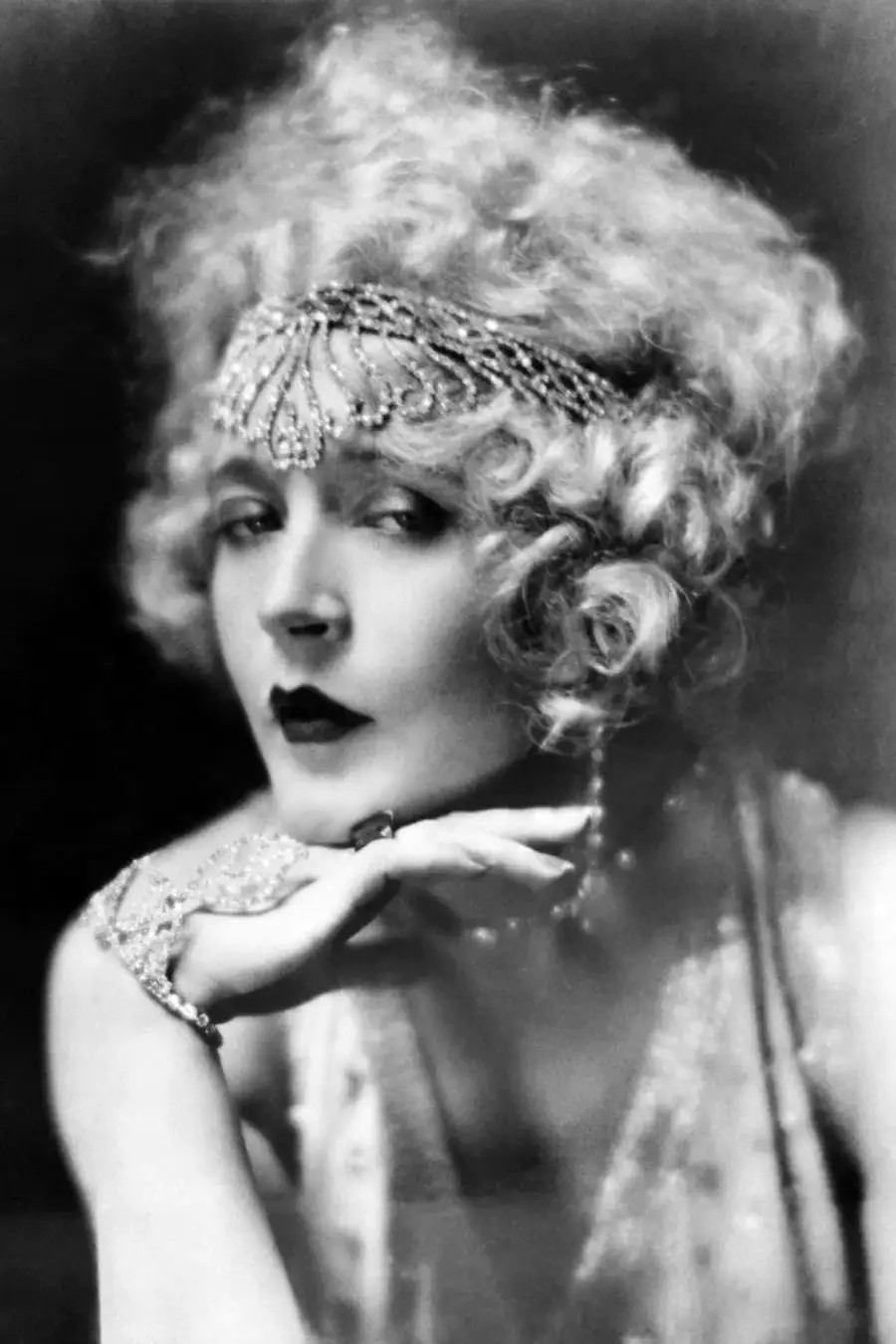
- Murray in 1925
- Born: Marie Adrienne Koenig; May 10, 1885; New York City, U.S.
- Died: March 23, 1965 (aged 79); Woodland Hills, Los Angeles, California, U.S.
- Resting place: Valhalla Memorial Park Cemetery
- Occupations: Actress; dancer; film producer; screenwriter
- Years active: 1906–1931
- Spouses: William M. Schwenker Jr. (m. 1908; div. 1910) Jay O'Brien (m. 1916; div. 1918) Robert Z. Leonard (m. 1918; div. 1925) David Mdivani (m. 1926; div. 1934)
- Children: 1

Mae Murray (born Marie Adrienne Koenig; May 10, 1885 – March 23, 1965) was an American actress, dancer, film producer, and screenwriter. Murray rose to fame during the silent film era and was known as "The Girl with the Bee-Stung Lips" and "The Gardenia of the Screen".

Marking her screen debut in To Have and to Hold (1916), Murray rose to prominence as a major film star and was one of Hollywood's leading actresses during the late 1910s and early 1920s.

== Early life ==
Murray was born in New York City, the second-oldest child of Joseph and Mary (née Miller) Koenig. Her maternal grandparents had emigrated from France while her paternal grandparents had emigrated from Germany. She had two brothers, William Robert and Howard Joseph.

The family eventually moved to an apartment on the Lower East Side of Manhattan. In May 1896, Murray's father, died from acute gastritis due to his alcoholism. To support the family, her mother took a job as a housekeeper for Harry Payne Whitney.

== Career ==
=== Stage ===
Murray began acting on the Broadway stage in 1906 with dancer Vernon Castle. In 1908, she joined the chorus line of the Ziegfeld Follies, moving to headliner by 1915. Murray became a star of the club circuit in both the United States and Europe, performing with Clifton Webb, Rudolph Valentino, and John Gilbert as some of her many dance partners.

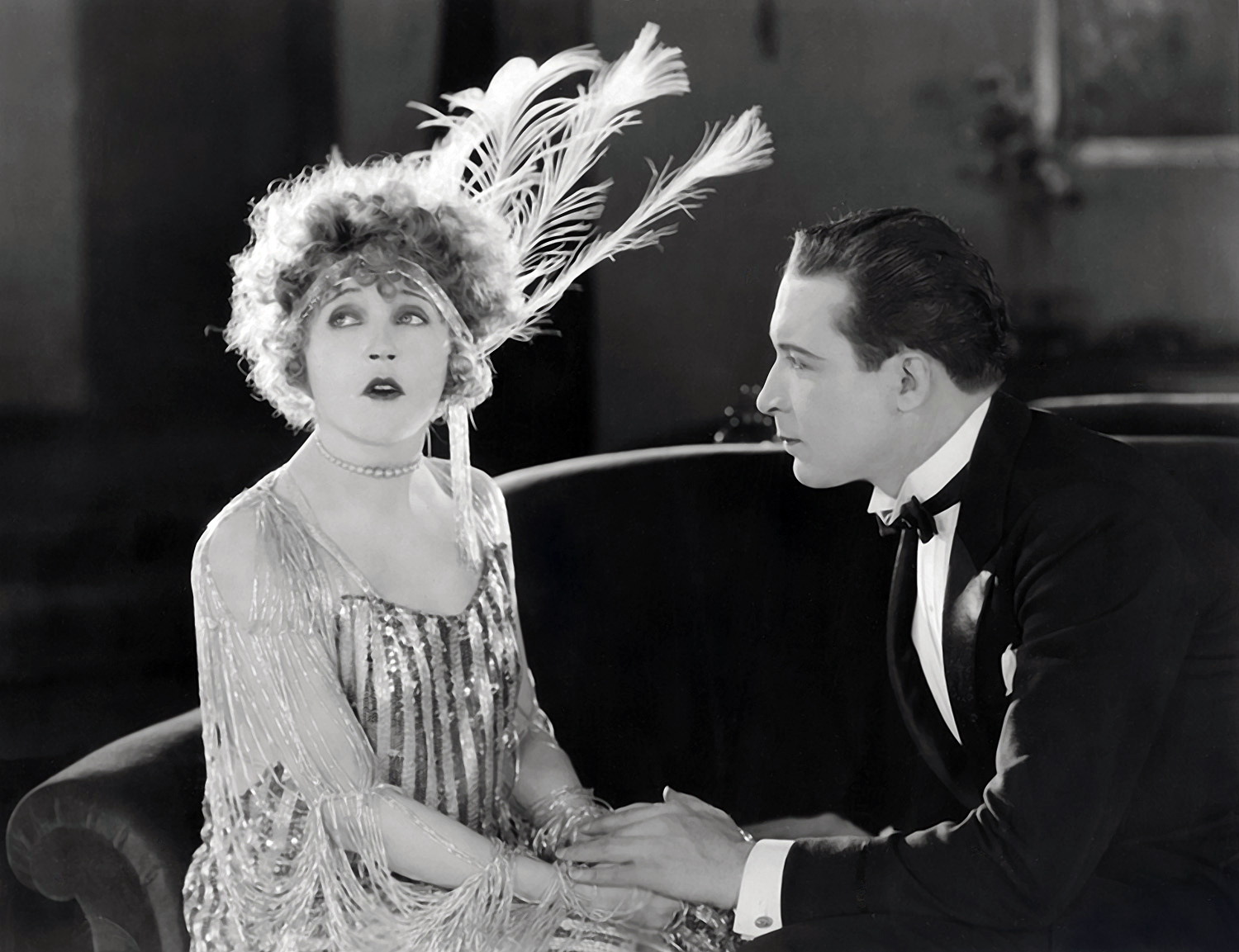
Murray and Monte Blue in Broadway Rose (1922)

=== Films ===
Murray made her motion picture debut in To Have and to Hold in 1916. She became a major star for Universal, starring with Rudolph Valentino in The Delicious Little Devil and Big Little Person in 1919. At the height of her popularity, Murray formed her own production company with Robert Z. Leonard. Critics were sometimes less than thrilled with her over-the-top costumes and exaggerated emoting, but her films were popular with movie-going audiences and financially successful.

In 1925, Murray, Leonard, and Stahl produced films at Tiffany Pictures, with Souls for Sables (1925), starring Claire Windsor and Eugene O'Brien, as the first film made by Tiffany. For a brief period of time, Murray wrote a weekly column for newspaper scion William Randolph Hearst.

At her career peak in the early 1920s, Murray, with other notable Hollywood personalities such as Cecil B. DeMille, Douglas Fairbanks, William S. Hart, Jesse L. Lasky, Harold Lloyd, Hal Roach, Donald Crisp, Conrad Nagel and Irving Thalberg, was a member of the board of trustees at the Motion Picture & Television Fund – a charitable organization that offers assistance and care to those in the motion picture and television industries without resources. Four decades later, Murray received aid from this organization.

In the early 1920s, Murray was painted by Hollywood portrait painter Theodore Lukits. This work titled Symphony in Jade and Gold (The Actress Mae Murray) (1922, private collection, northern California) depicted Murray nude, gazing in a mirror. It was exhibited at the Pacific Asia Museum in 1999 and two other venues as part of the exhibition Theodore Lukits, An American Orientalist.

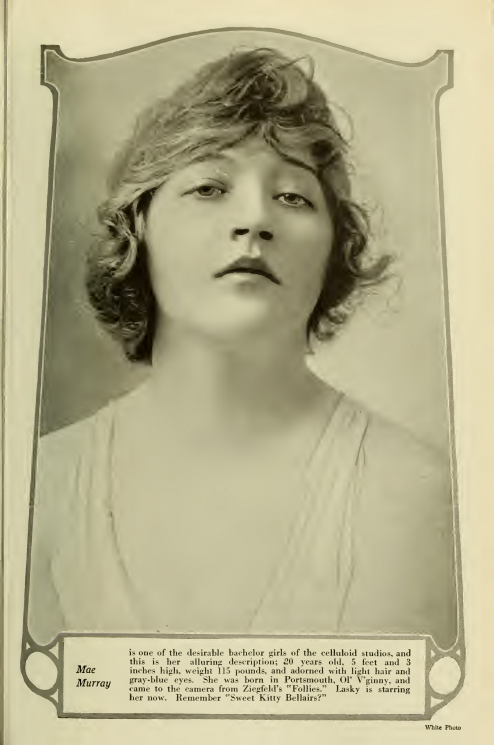
Murray featured in Photoplay magazine, 1916

=== Decline ===
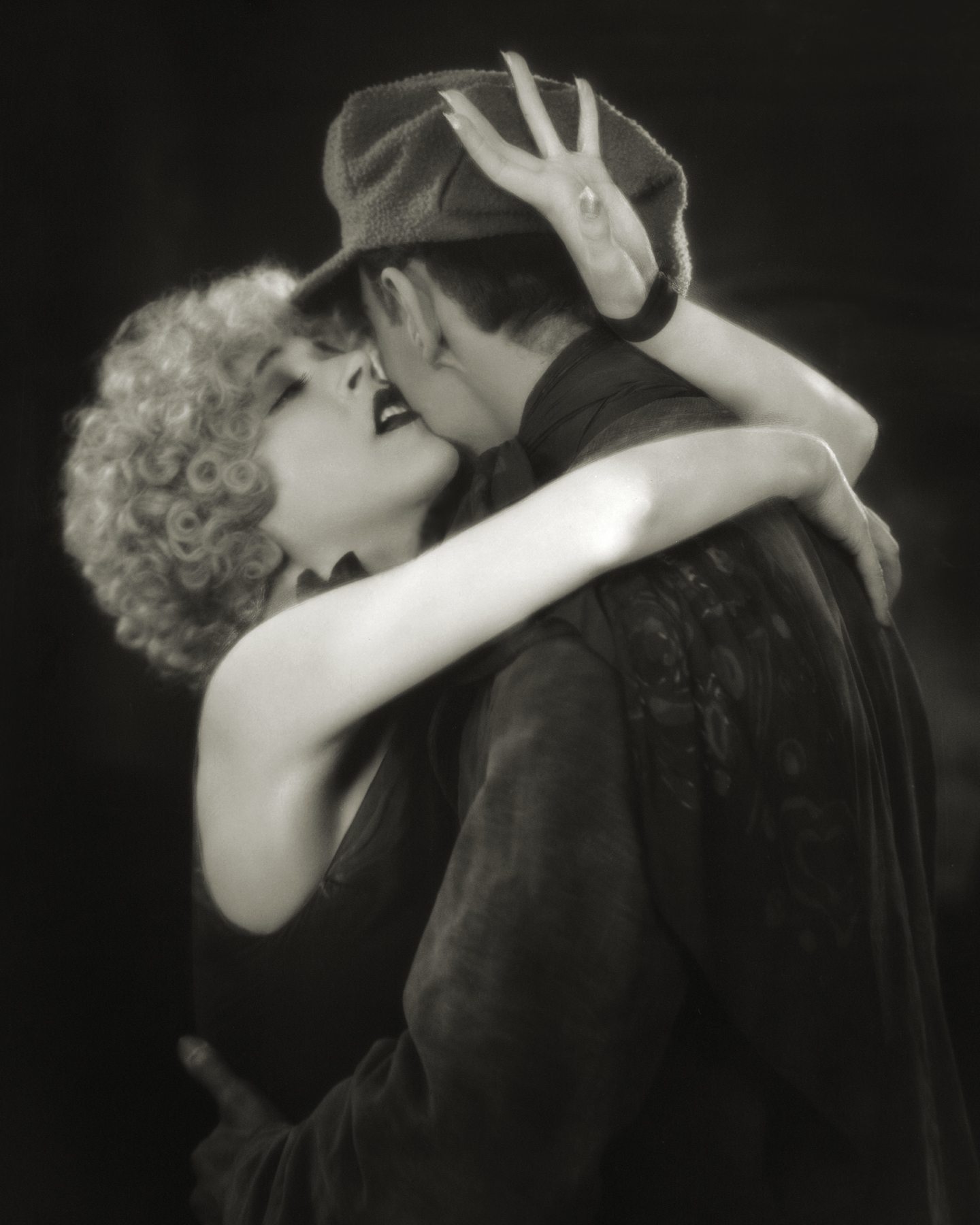
Murray in The Masked Bride (1925).

Murray appeared in the title role in the Erich von Stroheim-directed film The Merry Widow (1925), with John Gilbert. When silent films gave way to sound film, she debuted in the medium in Peacock Alley (1930), a remake of her earlier 1921 version Peacock Alley. In 1931, she was cast with Irene Dunne, Lowell Sherman, and fellow silent screen star Norman Kerry in Bachelor Apartment. The film was critically panned at the time of release, and Murray made only one more film: High Stakes (1931), also with Sherman.

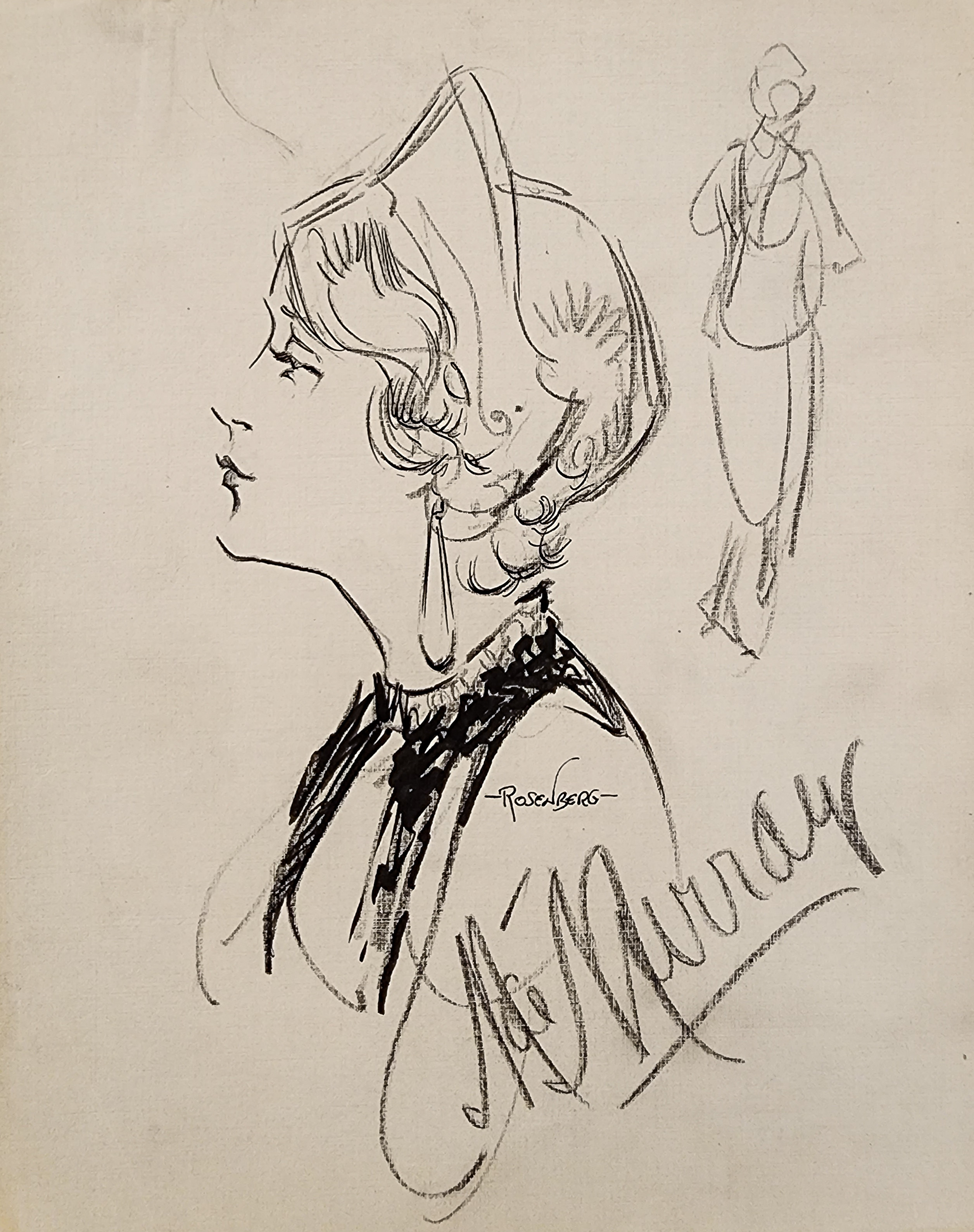
Signed drawing by Manuel Rosenberg 1927

A critical blow to her film career occurred after she married her fourth husband David Mdivani, a Georgian man of minor aristocratic roots, whose brothers Serge and Alexis married actress Pola Negri and the heiress Barbara Hutton respectively. The couple married on June 27, 1926, and Mdivani became her manager, suggesting that his new wife ought to leave MGM. Murray took her husband's advice and walked out of her contract with MGM, making a powerful foe of studio boss Louis B. Mayer. Later, she swallowed her pride and pleaded to return, but Mayer would not rehire her. In effect, Mayer's hostility meant that Murray was blacklisted from working for the Hollywood studios.

Meanwhile, in 1927, Murray was sued by her then-masseuse, the famous Hollywood fitness guru Sylvia of Hollywood, for the outstanding amount of $2,125; a humiliating and detailed court case followed.

== Later years ==
In the 1940s, Murray appeared regularly at Billy Rose's Diamond Horseshoe, a nightclub that specialized in a "Gay '90s" atmosphere, often presenting stars of the past for nostalgic value. Her appearances collected mixed reviews: her dancing (in particular the Merry Widow Waltz) was well received, but she was criticized for her youthful costumes and heavy makeup application, which were seen as attempts to conceal her age. In 1946 she taught ballroom dancing to teenagers at a dance studio in Los Angeles. It was located on Crenshaw Blvd., near 48th Street.

Murray's finances continued to collapse, and for most of her later life, she lived in poverty. She was the subject of the authorized biography The Self-Enchanted (1959), written by Jane Ardmore, that has been incorrectly called Murray's autobiography.

On the evening of February 19, 1964, 78-year-old Murray was found disoriented in St. Louis, thinking that she had completed a bus trip to New York City. Murray explained to a Salvation Army officer that she had become lost trying to find her hotel, which she had forgotten the name of. She also refused bus fare back to Los Angeles as she claimed to have a ticket for the remainder of the journey in her purse "if she could find it."

== Personal life ==
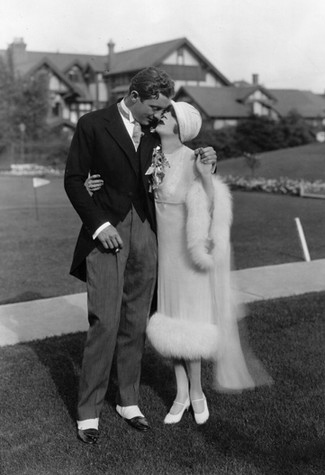
Murray with fourth husband David Mdivani in 1926

In September 1908, in Hoboken, New Jersey, while she was appearing in the Follies of 1908, Murray married William M. Schwenker Jr. (born 1885), the unemployed son of a brewery-supply dealer, who cut off his son's allowance upon news of the wedding; they divorced in 1910. On December 18, 1916, she married former dancer and future Olympic bobsled champion Jay O'Brien. He had been married to Irene Fenwick.

After divorcing O'Brien in 1918, Murray wed movie director Robert Z. Leonard on August 18, 1918; they divorced on May 26, 1925.

Murray married David Mdivani, her fourth husband, on June 27, 1926. They had one child, Koran David Mdivani (1926–2018), then divorced in 1933. Koran later was raised by Sara Elizabeth "Bess" Cunning of Averill Park, New York, who began taking care of him in 1936 when the child was recovering from a double mastoid operation (Cunning's brother Dr. David Cunning was the surgeon). When Murray attempted to regain custody of her son in 1939, Cunning and her other brothers, John, Ambrose, and Cortland, refused, according to The New York Times, at which time Murray and her former husband Mdivani entered a bitter custody dispute. It finally ended in 1940, with Murray being given legal custody of the child and the court's ordering Mdivani to pay $400 per month in support. However, Koran Mdivani continued to live with Bess Cunning, who adopted him in 1940 under the name Daniel Michael Cunning. Reportedly, Mdivani had managed to drain nearly all of Murray's money.

Murray campaigned for the reelection of President Herbert Hoover in 1932.

== Death ==
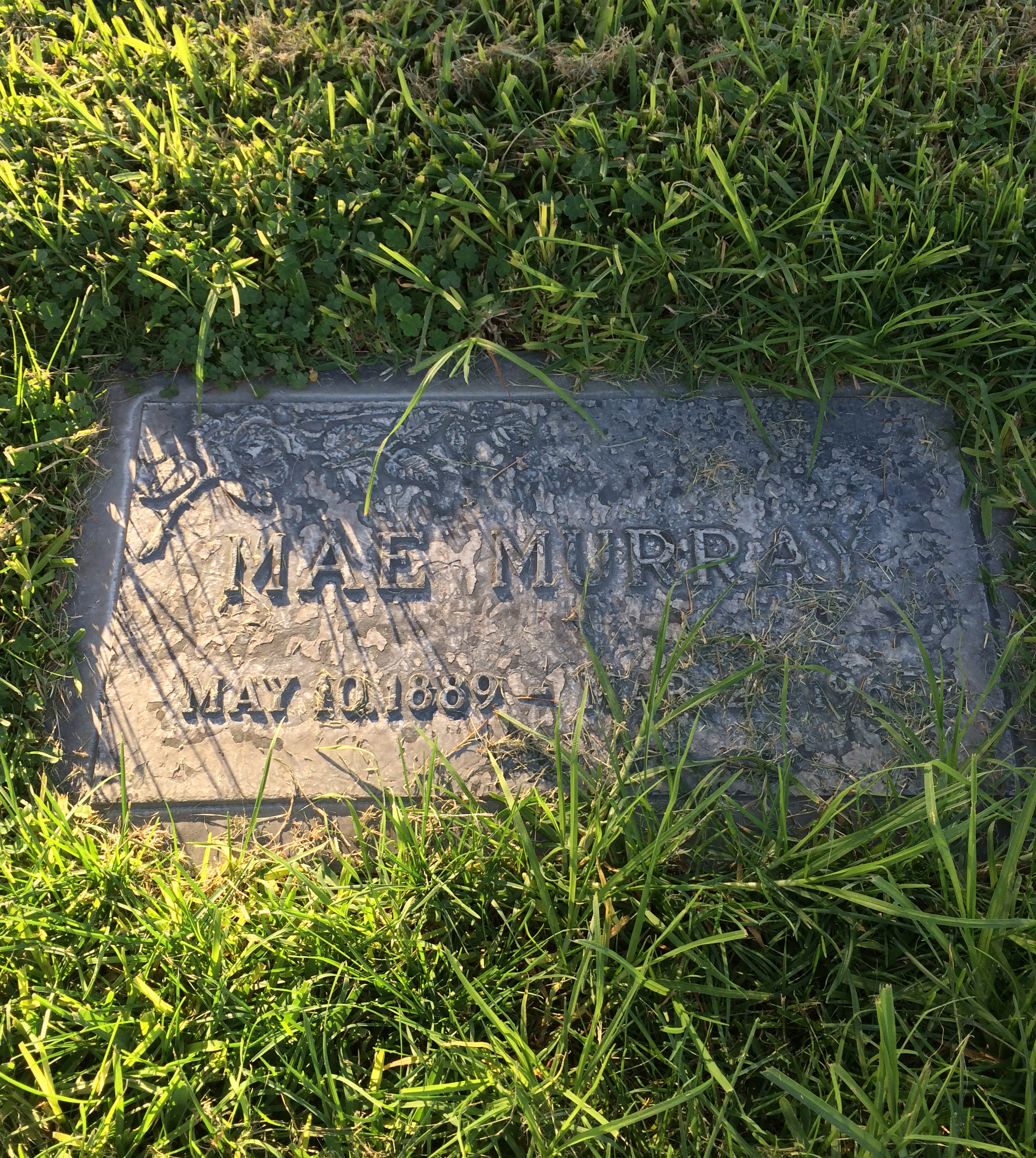
Grave of Mae Murray with the wrong year of birth, Valhalla Memorial Park

Many years later, Murray moved into the Motion Picture House in Woodland Hills, California, a retirement community for Hollywood professionals. She died there on March 23, 1965, at the age of 79. She is interred in Valhalla Memorial Park Cemetery in North Hollywood, California.

For her contribution to the motion picture industry, Mae Murray has a star on the Hollywood Walk of Fame at 6318 Hollywood Blvd. She was one of three actresses (Pola Negri and Theda Bara were the others) whose eyes were combined to form the Chicago International Film Festival's logo, a stark, black-and-white close-up of the composite eyes set as repeated frames in a strip of film.

== Filmography ==
Key
†	Denotes a lost or presumed lost film.

Year	Title	Role	Notes
1916	To Have and to Hold †	Lady Jocelyn	
1916	Sweet Kitty Bellairs †	Kitty Bellairs	
1916	The Dream Girl †	Meg Dugan	
1916	The Big Sister †	Betty Norton	
1916	The Plow Girl †	Margot	
1917	On Record †	Helen Wayne	
1917	A Mormon Maid	Dora	
1917	The Primrose Ring †	Margaret MacLean	
1917	At First Sight †	Justina	
1917	Princess Virtue	Lianne Demarest	
1917	Face Value	Joan Darby	Writer (story)
1918	The Bride's Awakening	Elaine Bronson	
1918	Her Body in Bond †	Peggy Blondin	Alternative title: The Heart of an Actress
1918	Modern Love †	Della Arnold	Writer (story)
1918	The Taming of Kaiser Bull †	Miss America	Short
1918	Danger, Go Slow †	Mugsy Mulane	Writer
1919	The Scarlet Shadow †	Elena Evans	
1919	The Twin Pawns	Daisy/Violet White	Alternative title: The Curse of Greed
1919	The Delicious Little Devil	Mary McGuire	
1919	What Am I Bid? †	Betty Yarnell	Alternative title: Girl For Sale
1919	The Big Little Person †	Arathea Manning	
1919	The A.B.C. of Love	Kate	
1920	On with the Dance †	Sonia	
1920	The Right to Love	Lady Falkland	
1920	Idols of Clay	Faith Merrill	
1921	The Gilded Lily	Lillian Drake	
1922	Peacock Alley †	Cleo of Paris	
1922	Fascination †	Dolores de Lisa	
1922	Broadway Rose	Rosalie Lawrence	
1923	Jazzmania	Ninon	
1923	The French Doll	Georgine Mazulier	
1923	Fashion Row †	Olga Farinova/Zita (her younger sister)	
1924	Mademoiselle Midnight	Renée de Gontran/Renée de Quiros	
1924	Circe, the Enchantress	Circe (mythical goddess)/Cecilie Brunne	Alternative title: Circe
1925	The Merry Widow	Sally O'Hara	
1925	The Masked Bride †	Gaby	
1926	Valencia †	Valencia	Alternative title: The Love Song
1927	Altars of Desire	Claire Sutherland	
1930	Peacock Alley	Claire Tree	
1931	Bachelor Apartment	Mrs. Agatha Carraway	Alternative title: Apartamento de Soltero
1931	High Stakes	Dolly Jordan Lennon	
