= A Mormon Maid =

1917 film by Robert Zigler Leonard

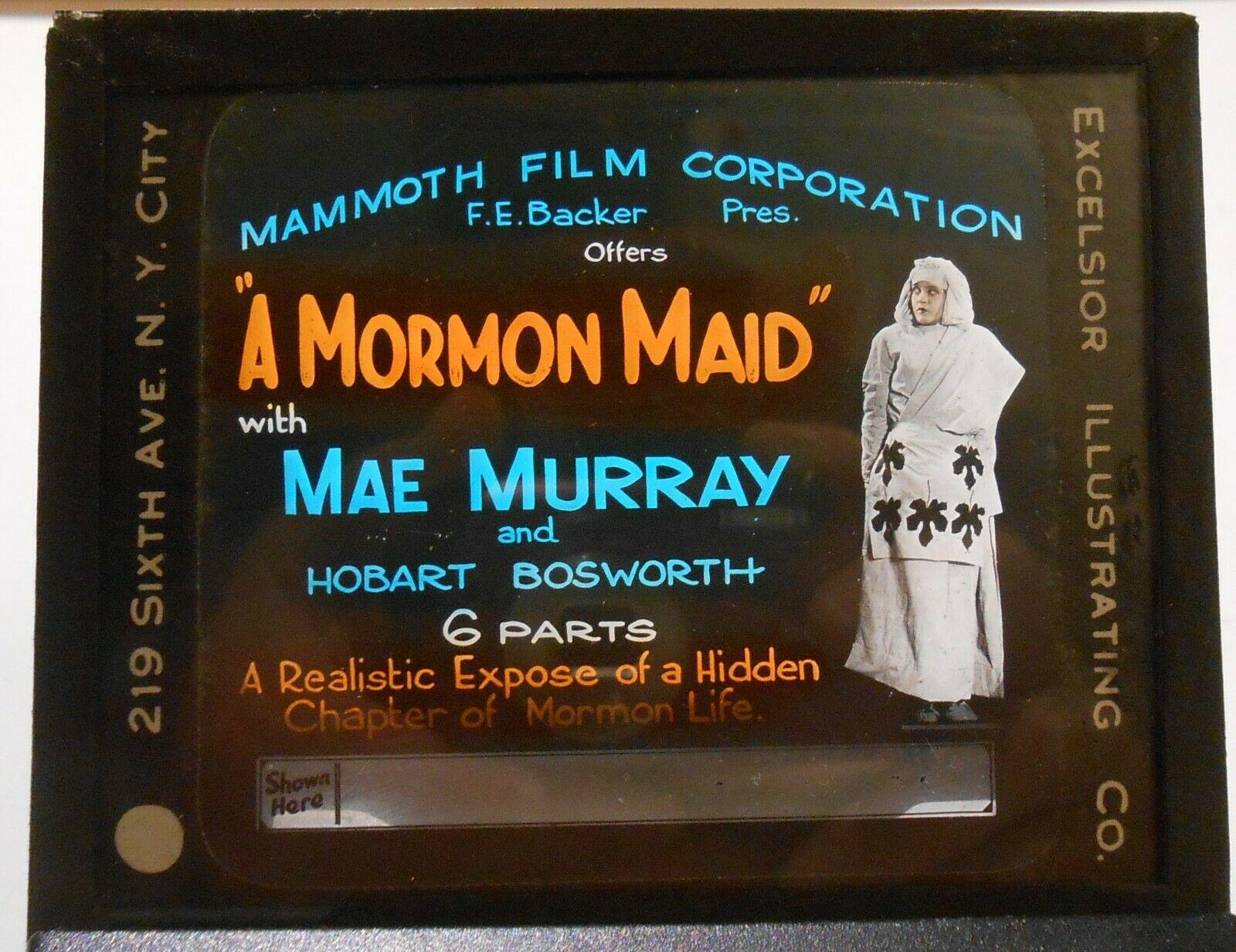
- Directed by: Robert Z. Leonard
- Screenplay by: Charles Sarver; Paul West
- Produced by: Jesse L. Lasky
- Starring: Mae Murray; Frank Borzage; Hobart Bosworth; Edythe Chapman; Noah Beery, Sr. Richard Henry Cummings
- Cinematography: Charles Rosher
- Production company: Jesse L. Lasky Feature Play Company
- Distributed by: Paramount Pictures
- Release date: April 22, 1917
- Running time: 68 minutes
- Country: United States
- Language: Silent (English intertitles)

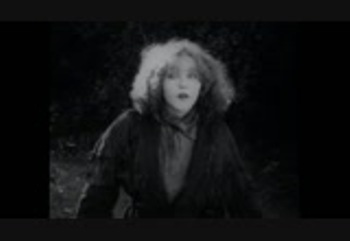
Mae Murray in the film

A Mormon Maid is a 1917 American silent drama film directed by Robert Z. Leonard and written by Charles Sarver and Paul West. While traveling westward with her family, Dora must face the proposal to become a Mormon elder's sixth wife. The film stars Mae Murray, Frank Borzage, Hobart Bosworth, Edythe Chapman, Noah Beery Sr., and Richard Henry Cummings. The film was released on April 22, 1917, by Paramount Pictures. The film survives complete.

== Plot ==
A Mormon Maid (1917)

Set in the 1840s during the Mormon migration westward, this film introduces a young woman named Dora and her family as they travel west. After being saved from an Indian attack by a Mormon community, the family joins their wagon train traveling to Utah. Throughout the film, Dora is pursued by two men, one a recent convert to the church and the other a scheming elder with multiple wives. Dora's mother ends up killing herself due to her revulsion towards polygamy, leaving Dora to consider her own future and the man she loves. The elder is a former apostle of the church and is determined to have Dora as his sixth wife. After refusing to marry him, Dora eventually ends up killing the old man as he tries to capture her for his own. To summarize, the plot of this film explores the implications of Dora's rejecting becoming a polygamist wife.

== Cast ==
- Mae Murray as Dora
- Frank Borzage as Tom Rigdon
- Hobart Bosworth as John Hogue
- Edythe Chapman as Nancy Hogue
- Noah Beery, Sr. as Darius Burr
- Richard Henry Cummings as Lion of the Lord

== Reception ==
Like many American films of the time, A Mormon Maid was subject to cuts by city and state film censorship boards. The Chicago Board of Censors cut two intertitles, "I am not a –" and "You have scoffed at our faith – now you will pay." Many towns received this film with open arms, understanding the film as an exposé on Mormonism and the religion's practices.
