= Peacock Alley (1930 film) =

1930 film

- Lobby card
- Directed by: Marcel de Sano
- Written by: Frances Hyland; Wells Root; Carey Wilson
- Story by: Carey Wilson
- Produced by: Robert Z. Leonard
- Starring: Mae Murray; George Barraud; Jason Robards, Sr. Richard Tucker; William L. Thorne; Phillips Smalley; E. H. Calvert; Arthur Hoyt; Billy Bevan
- Cinematography: Benjamin H. Kline; Harry Zech
- Edited by: Clarence Kolster
- Distributed by: Tiffany Pictures
- Release date: January 10, 1930
- Running time: 63 minutes
- Country: United States
- Language: English

Peacock Alley is a 1930 American pre-Code musical romantic drama film directed by Marcel de Sano, and starring Mae Murray and George Barraud. The film is a remake of the 1922 silent film of the same name in which Murray also stars. Aside from Murray being cast in the lead, the remake was largely different from the 1922 silent film. While Murray's character in the 1922 film was named Cleo, she was renamed Claire Tree in this film. George Barraud replaced Monte Blue as the male lead, who is now named Clayton Stoddard.

The film was shot in black-and-white except for a two-color Technicolor sequence in which Murray tangos and impersonates both a toreador and a bull. The film's sets were designed by the art director Hervey Libbert.

== Plot ==
The film takes place entirely in New York City, removing the Paris portion of the earlier film's plot. Rather than falling in love with a man who happens along her way, Claire is actively looking for a husband. Two possibilities present themselves: a Texan, who ultimately rejects Claire because he believes her to be immoral, and Stoddard, who agrees to marry her in the end.

== Cast ==
- Mae Murray as Claire Tree
- George Barraud as Stoddard Clayton
- Jason Robards, Sr. as Jim Bradbury (credited as Jason Robards)
- Richard Tucker as Martin Saunders
- W.L. Thorne as Dugan
- Phillips Smalley as Bonner
- Billy Bevan as Walter - Bell Captain
- E. H. Calvert as Paul
- Arthur Hoyt as Crosby

== Production ==
Produced by Tiffany Pictures, the film was lavishly produced with elaborate sets despite its low budget. Murray's silent films had been very successful and she and Bob Leonard had been founding members of Tiffany. However, by the time this remake was produced Murray's marriage to Leonard had come to an end as had the fortunes of Tiffany Pictures.

The film was intended to be a comeback vehicle for Murray as her career had declined after she was unofficially blacklisted by Louis B. Mayer after she walked out on her MGM contract in 1927. Unlike the silent version, the sound remake of Peacock Alley did not boost Murray's career and earned mostly unfavorable reviews. Photoplay called the film "a sorry affair" and Murray's performance "more affected and more bee-stung of mouth than ever. You'll laugh at the drama and weep over the comedy."

Murray alleged that Tiffany Pictures' crew had damaged her career by way of their technical incompetence displayed throughout the film. Because of this, she attempted to sue the company for $1,750,000, but was unsuccessful.

== Censorship ==
Before the film could be exhibited in Kansas, the Kansas Board of Review required the removal of the close-up curtain calls where the dancers' navels are showing.

== See also ==
- List of early color feature films
