= Mademoiselle Midnight =

1924 film by Robert Zigler Leonard

- Italian poster
- Directed by: Robert Z. Leonard
- Written by: Carl Harbaugh; John Russell
- Produced by: Robert Z. Leonard
- Starring: Mae Murray; Monte Blue
- Cinematography: Oliver T. Marsh
- Production company: Tiffany Productions
- Distributed by: Metro Pictures
- Release date: April 14, 1924
- Running time: 70 minutes
- Country: United States
- Language: Silent (English intertitles)

Mademoiselle Midnight is a 1924 American silent drama film starring Mae Murray and directed by Murray's then husband, Robert Z. Leonard. The film was written by Carl Harbaugh and John Russell. The film was the final release of Metro under the Tiffany Productions banner, owned by the couple. A complete print of the film survives.

The film depicts a love triangle between a Mexican heiress (granddaughter of a French exile), an American traveler, and a local outlaw.

== Plot ==
Renée (Mae Murray) is the heiress of a Mexican ranch, granddaughter of a woman known for her recklessness and frivolity at night. This first "Mademoiselle Midnight" is banished in the opening scene by Napoleon III at Eugénie de Montijo's insistence to Mexico. Renee is kept locked at the hacienda at night by her father to prevent her following in her grandmother's wayward footsteps. She falls in love with a visiting American (Monte Blue) but is also pursued by the craven outlaw Manuel Corrales. Miss Murray gets to do some of her trademark dancing, but this one isn't a comedy, despite comic relief provided by Johnny Arthur.

== Cast ==
- Mae Murray as Renée de Gontran/Renée de Quiros
- John St. Polis as Colonel de Gontran (Prologue)
- Paul Weigel as Napoleon III (Prologue)
- Earl Schenck as Emperor Maximilian (Prologue)
- Clarissa Selwynne as Empress Eugénie (Prologue)
- J. Farrell MacDonald as Duc de Moing (Prologue)
- Monte Blue as Owen Burke/Jerry Brent
- Robert McKim as João/Manuel Corrales
- Robert Edeson as Don Pedro de Quiros
- Nick De Ruiz as Don José de Quiros
- Nigel De Brulier as Dr. Sanchez
- Johnny Arthur as Carlos de Quiros
- Otis Harlan as Padre Francisco
- Mathilde Comont as The duenna
- Don Alvarado as Dancer at Fiesta (uncredited)
