= What Am I Bid? =

1919 film American film directed by Robert Z. Leonard

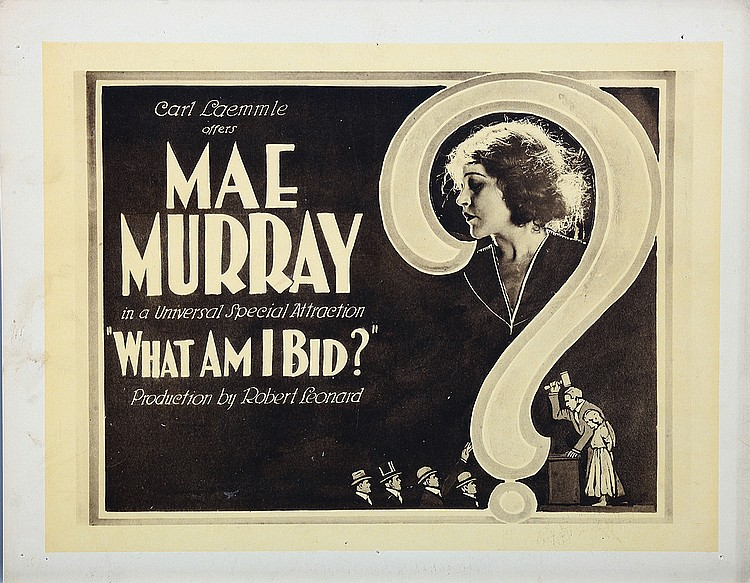
- Directed by: Robert Z. Leonard
- Written by: Harvey F. Thew; John B. Clymer
- Starring: Mae Murray; Ralph Graves; Willard Louis
- Cinematography: Allen G. Siegler
- Production company: Universal Pictures
- Distributed by: Universal Pictures
- Release date: April 14, 1919
- Country: United States
- Languages: Silent; English intertitles

What Am I Bid? is a lost 1919 American silent romance film directed by Robert Z. Leonard and starring Mae Murray, Ralph Graves and Willard Louis.

== Cast ==
- Mae Murray as Betty Yarnell
- Ralph Graves as Ralph McGibbon
- Willard Louis as Abner Grimp
- Dark Cloud as Dark Cloud
- John Cook as John Yarnell
- Gertrude Astor as Diana Newlands
- Joseph W. Girard as John McGibbon

== Preservation ==
With no holdings located in archives, What Am I Bid? is considered a lost film.

== Bibliography ==
- Michael G. Ankerich. Mae Murray: The Girl with the Bee-stung Lips. University Press of Kentucky, 2012.
