= The Plow Girl =

1916 film by Robert Zigler Leonard

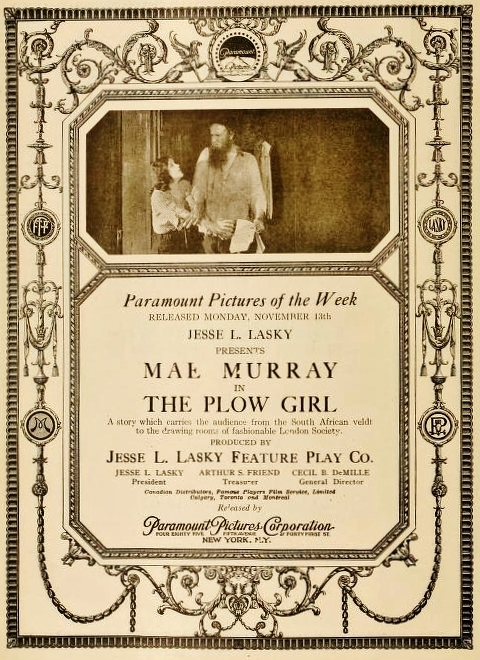
- Directed by: Robert Z. Leonard
- Screenplay by: Edward Morris; Charles Sarver; Harvey F. Thew
- Produced by: Jesse L. Lasky
- Starring: Mae Murray; Elliott Dexter; Charles K. Gerrard; Edythe Chapman; Horace B. Carpenter; William Elmer
- Cinematography: Charles Rosher
- Production company: Jesse L. Lasky Feature Play Company
- Distributed by: Paramount Pictures
- Release date: November 13, 1916
- Running time: 50 minutes
- Country: United States
- Language: English

The Plow Girl is a lost 1916 American drama silent film directed by Robert Z. Leonard and written by Edward Morris, Charles Sarver and Harvey F. Thew. The film stars Mae Murray, Elliott Dexter, Charles K. Gerrard, Edythe Chapman, Horace B. Carpenter and William Elmer. The film was released on November 13, 1916, by Paramount Pictures.

== Cast ==
- Mae Murray as Margot
- Elliott Dexter as John Stoddard
- Charles K. Gerrard as Lord Percy
- Edythe Chapman as Lady Brentwood
- Horace B. Carpenter as M. Pantani
- William Elmer as Kregler
- Lillian Leighton as Stoddard's Mother
- Jane Wolfe
- Theodore Roberts

== Preservation ==
With no holdings located in archives, The Plow Girl is considered a lost film.
