= Princess Virtue =

1917 film

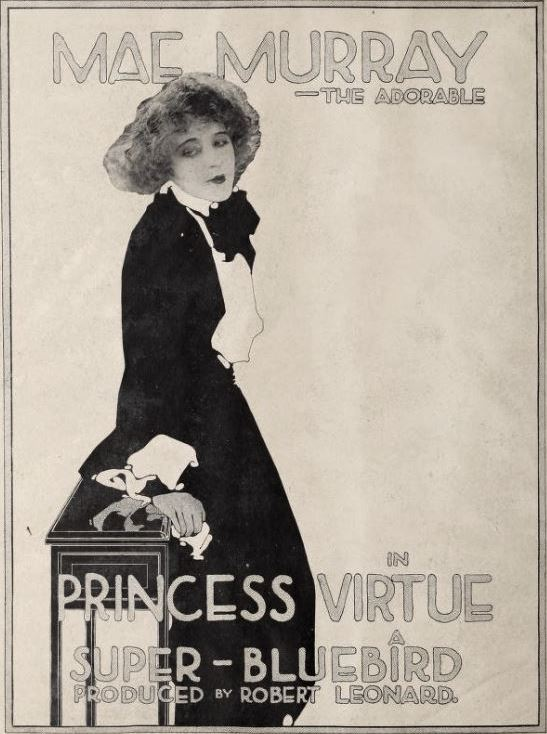
- Directed by: Robert Z. Leonard
- Written by: Louise Winter (novel); Fred Myton
- Starring: Mae Murray; Lule Warrenton; Wheeler Oakman
- Cinematography: Alfred Gosden
- Production company: Bluebird Photoplays
- Distributed by: Universal Pictures
- Release date: October 28, 1917
- Running time: 60 minutes
- Country: United States
- Languages: Silent; English intertitles

Princess Virtue is a 1917 American silent drama film directed by Robert Z. Leonard and starring Mae Murray, Lule Warrenton and Wheeler Oakman. An incomplete copy was found and kept in the Library of Congress. Prints and/or fragments were found in the Dawson Film Find in 1978.

== Cast ==
- Mae Murray as Lianne Demarest
- Lule Warrenton as Clare Demarest
- Wheeler Oakman as Basil Demarest
- Clarissa Selwynne as Countess Oudoff
- Gretchen Lederer as Mlle. Sari
- Harry von Meter as Count Oudoff
- Paul Nicholson as Baron Strensky
- Jean Hersholt as Emile Carre

== Production ==
The Hotel del Coronado's Tent City setting is featured in the film.

== Bibliography ==
- James Robert Parish & Michael R. Pitts. Film directors: a guide to their American films. Scarecrow Press, 1974.
