= Modern Love (1918 film) =

1918 silent film

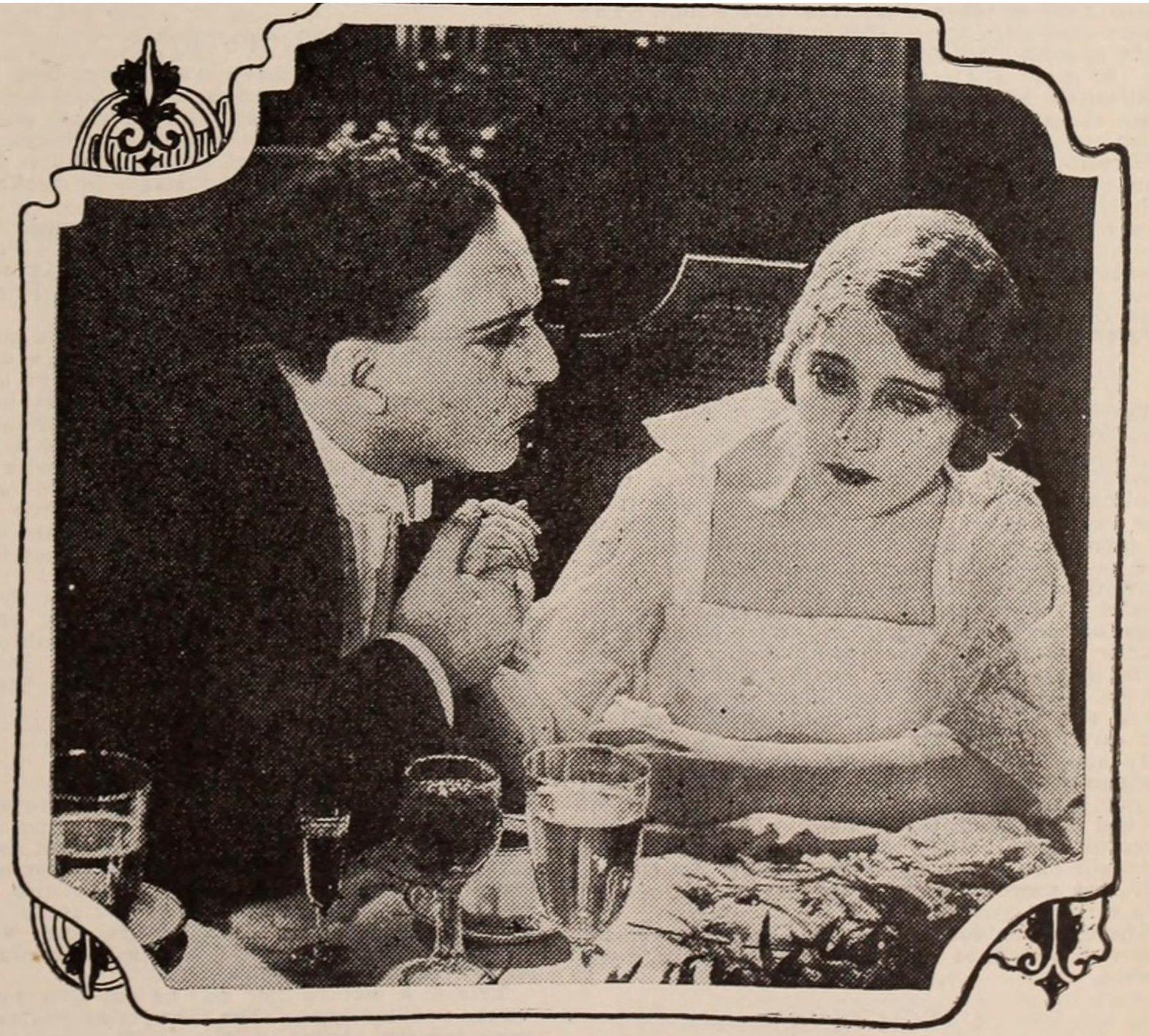
- Directed by: Robert Z. Leonard
- Written by: Mae Murray; Robert Z. Leonard; F. McGrew Willis
- Starring: Mae Murray; Philo McCullough; Arthur Shirley
- Cinematography: Allen G. Siegler
- Production company: Universal Pictures
- Distributed by: Universal Pictures
- Release date: September 14, 1918
- Running time: 60 minutes
- Country: United States
- Languages: Silent; English intertitles

Modern Love is a lost 1918 American silent drama film directed by Robert Z. Leonard and starring Mae Murray, Philo McCullough, and Arthur Shirley.

== Plot ==
The plot according to a film magazine, "Della Arnold, a recent recruit from a dramatic school, is out of a position, and she gets an opportunity to get another one through Mrs. Hall, who has played in the same company with her. But when she arrives at the theatre she finds that the leading man is Julian Lawrence, and without giving any explanation to her friend she refuses to accept the position and returns to New York.

In her apartment she meets Myrtle Harris, who invites her to a party in which George Addison, a wealthy idler, was present. He was attracted by her beauty. Della expresses a desire to leave the stage. Myrtle suggested that George Addison might secure a good position for her. Myrtle mentioned the fact to him. George recommends Della as a model to Wilbur Henderson, an artist. Henderson falls in love with Della and proposes. She accepts. At the club Henderson meets Lawrence, who is a close friend to him, and tells him he is about to marry Della. He laughs. This arouses Henderson's suspicions and he demands to know. Lawrence tells him a false story that they remained in a hotel registered as husband and wife.

Henderson returns home and asks Della if it is true. She denies it but he will not believe her. Angered, she dismisses him and tells him men such as he drive women to desperation.

Della asks Myrtle if there was room in their party that night for one more. Myrtle answers she will make one. Della dresses and gets there. Addison, who was present, is glad to see her, and in asking his friends to toast the bride to be she rises and begs them not to make such a toast as there will be no marriage. Myrtle nods the guests to retire, leaving George and Della alone. He asks her if it is true she is not to marry Henderson, and if so if she would consent to become his wife. She tells him that before she consents he must listen to the reason of the breaking of her marriage engagement. She then tells him how she and Lawrence, while on the road with a one-night stand company missed the train, and how they were compelled to remain in a hotel for the night, and how Lawrence, unknown to her, signed the hotel register for her as his wife, came up to her room and tried to attack her, and how she was saved by the hotel proprietor, who was aroused by her screams. Then all is happiness."

== Cast ==
- Mae Murray as Della Arnold
- Philo McCullough as Julian Lawrence
- Arthur Shirley as George Addison
- Claire Du Brey as Myrtle Harris
- George Chesebro as Wilbur Henderson
- Mrs. A.E. Wright as Mrs. Hall

== Reception ==
Variety's review was negative, stating that the cinematography was "lacking," the settings were "shabby," and the film was "very ordinary." Motion Picture News reviewer P.S. Harrison gave the film a positive review, saying "It will engage wholly your attention and, as the action keeps at a steady pace, will hold your interest to the end." He suggests that the scene where Della is attacked by Lawrence could be removed by the film exchange, "without injuring the continuity", if the patrons were "discriminating."

The Chicago Board of Censors required the elimination of several intertitles and scenes before the film could be exhibited in Chicago. The intertitles removed said "And we registered as man and wife.", "You don't deny it — then it is true?", "Tell me when? After we were married?", "I might have known what you were when Addison sent me to you.", and "That wife of yours is some pippin." The scenes removed were of Lawrence signing the hotel register, the struggle between Della and Lawrence, the scenes downstairs implying a struggle, and all scenes of the hotel staff breaking down the door and rescuing Della.

== Preservation ==
With no holdings located in archives, Modern Love is considered a lost film.

== Bibliography ==
- John T. Weaver. Twenty Years of Silents, 1908-1928. Scarecrow Press, 1971.
