= The Delicious Little Devil =

1919 film by Robert Zigler Leonard

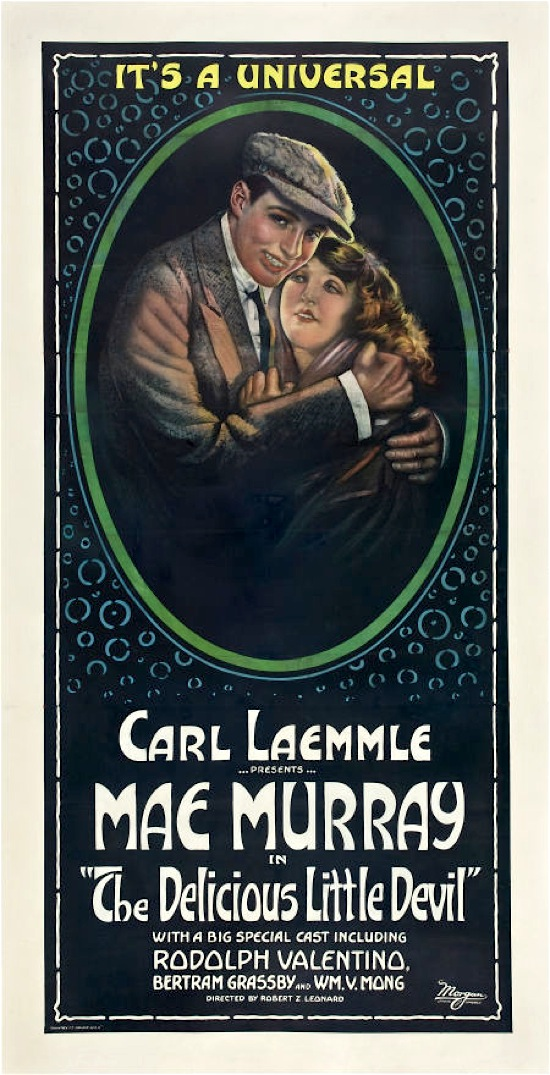
- Directed by: Robert Z. Leonard
- Written by: Harvey F. Thew (scenario)
- Story by: John B. Clymer; Harvey F. Thew
- Starring: Mae Murray; Rudolph Valentino; William V. Mong
- Cinematography: Allen G. Siegler
- Distributed by: Universal Film Manufacturing Company
- Release date: May 20, 1919
- Running time: 74 minutes
- Country: United States
- Languages: Silent; English intertitles

The Delicious Little Devil is a 1919 American silent comedy-drama film starring Mae Murray and Rudolph Valentino. A 35 mm print of the film is housed at the EYE Film Instituut Nederland, Nederlands Filmmuseum.

Full film

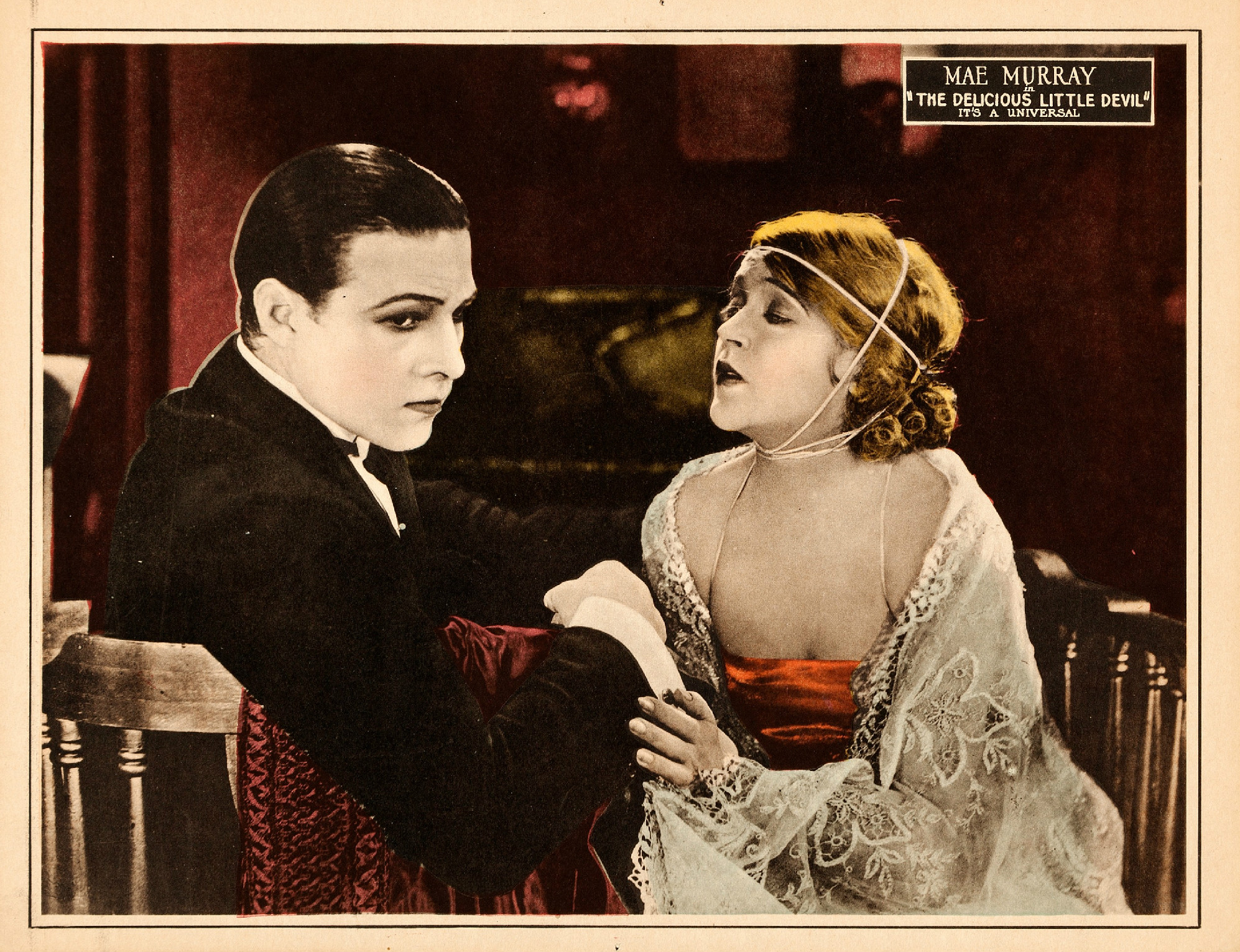
Lobby card

== Plot ==
Mary McGuire is a working-class young girl who lives in a New York tenement and supports her mother and her shiftless father and uncle.

Two items in the March 27, 1919 edition of The New York Star catch her attention. The first is a news item about the famous dancer Gloria du Moine going into hiding over a scandal involving her relationship with the Duke de Sauterne. (This was Murray in a thinly disguised portrayal obviously mimicking fellow real life dancer/star Gaby Deslys who had an affair with the King of Portugal before World War I). The second is a classified ad for the Peach Tree Inn, a nightspot that aims to be the "snappiest roadhouse this side of Monte Carlo." The Peach Tree's ad seeks a female hostess and dancer: "A Good Future For A Girl With A Past."

Mary applies for the job. To help cinch the deal, Mary tells Peach Tree manager Larry McKean that she's really Gloria du Moine. Larry asks her why she's dressed so shabbily. Mary replies that her servant absconded with all of her clothing, leaving her to wear the servant's clothes.

Mary—or rather, Gloria—gets the job, and the Peach Tree Inn promotes its grand opening night, featuring Gloria du Moine. In the audience for Gloria du Moine's Peach Tree opening night is Jimmy Calhoun, scion of the millionaire contractor Michael Calhoun. The young Calhoun meets Gloria and finds her enchanting. He tells his father he'd like to propose to her. Michael Calhoun arranges a small, private dinner party at the Peach Tree Inn in honor of Gloria. The elder Calhoun hopes that Gloria will make some sort of faux pas that will discourage his son from seeking her hand in marriage.

Meanwhile, the Duke de Sauterne has arrived in New York from Europe and noted the press announcements touting Gloria du Moine's performances at the Peach Tree Inn. The duke sets out to see her at the roadhouse, and his arrival coincides with Michael Calhoun's dinner party. The duke is escorted into Calhoun's private room. He gives no indication that Gloria du Moine is an imposter.

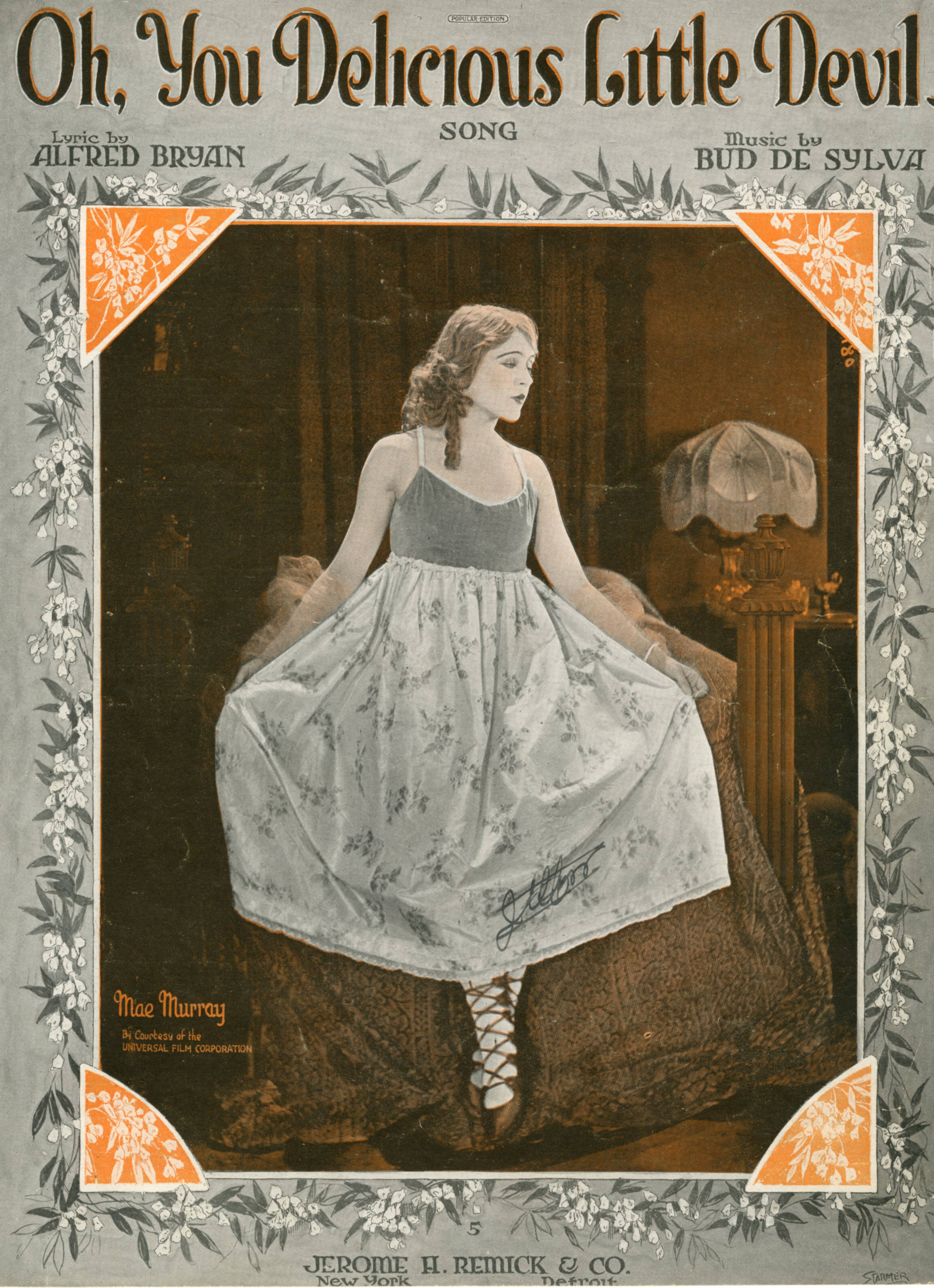
Sheet music cover - OH YOU DELICIOUS LITTLE DEVIL - SONG (1919)

At sunrise, the dinner party guests are still at the Peach Tree Inn, sleeping off the drinks they consumed during the evening. Gloria/Mary wakes up and hurries upstairs to her lavish private suite. The duke also wakes up and follows her, and Jimmy follows him. Jimmy and the duke get into a fight, and the duke sends Jimmy tumbling down the staircase.

Mary runs outside, gets into a car and heads for her family's tenement apartment in New York City. The duke and Jimmy follow her separately in their own cars. The duke arrives first, follows Mary up the stairs to the apartment and forces his way in. He grabs Mary and tries to kiss her. Jimmy arrives and engages the duke in another fight. A detective arrives and apprehends the duke for deportation to Europe on accusations of being a swindler. Jimmy's father arrives, notes Mary's humble surroundings and grants his blessing for Jimmy to marry her.

== Cast ==
- Mae Murray - Mary McGuire
- Richard Cummings - Uncle Barney
- Harry Rattenbury - Pat McGuire
- Edward Jobson - Michael Calhoun, Jimmy's father
- Rudolph Valentino - Jimmy Calhoun
- Burt Woodruff - Musk, Peach Tree Inn proprietor
- Martha Mattox - His Wife
- William V. Mong - Larry McKean, Peach Tree Inn manager
- Ivor McFadden - Percy, neighborhood butcher boy and Mary's friend
- Bertram Grassby - Duke de Sauterne
- Gertrude Astor - Woman with the talcum powder (uncredited)
- Alice Knowland - Undetermined Role (uncredited)
