= Circe, the Enchantress =

1924 film by Robert Zigler Leonard

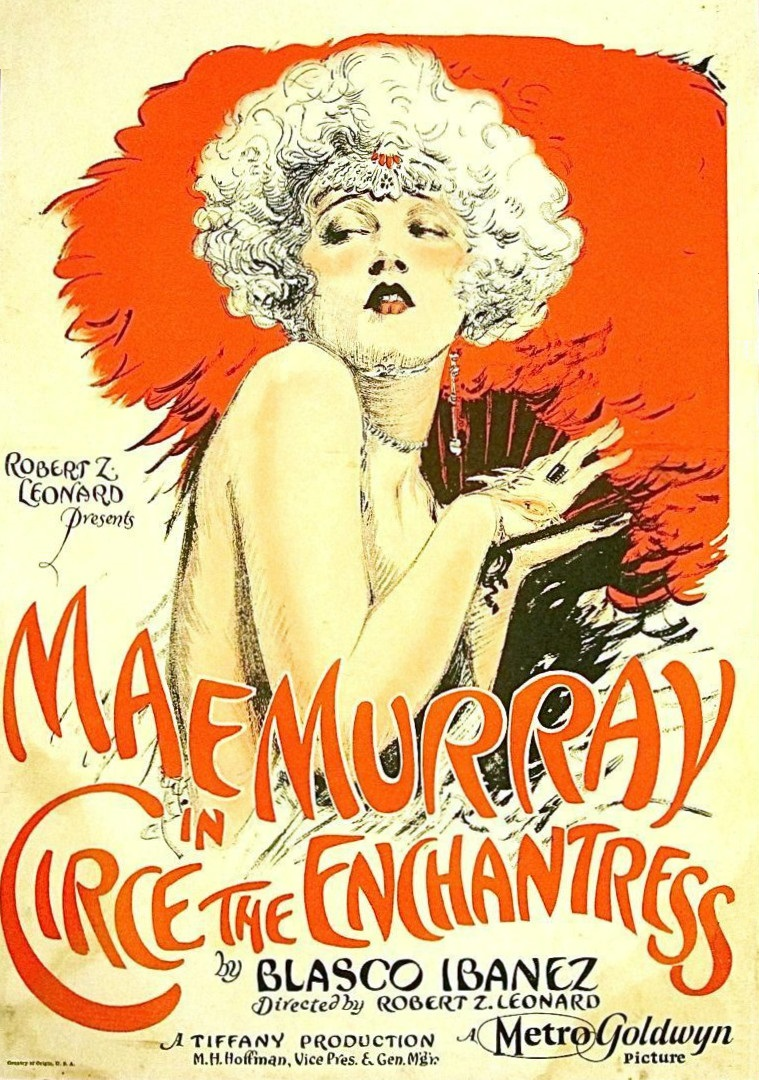
- lobby poster
- Directed by: Robert Z. Leonard
- Written by: Vicente Blasco Ibáñez; Douglas Doty (adaptation); Fanny Hatton (titles); Frederic Hatton (titles)
- Starring: Mae Murray; James Kirkwood, Sr.
- Cinematography: Oliver T. Marsh
- Production company: Tiffany Pictures
- Distributed by: Metro-Goldwyn
- Release date: October 6, 1924
- Running time: 74 minutes
- Country: United States
- Languages: Silent; English intertitles

Circe, the Enchantress is a 1924 American silent drama film directed by Robert Z. Leonard. The film starred Leonard's then-wife Mae Murray. This was their last collaboration, and they divorced soon after.

Considered to be a lost film for decades, a print of Circe, the Enchantress was found at a foreign film archive.

== Plot ==
Cecilie Brunner was once a good natured woman. After the death of her mother, she becomes a cynical vamp. She falls in love with surgeon Peter Van Martyn. Peter makes clear he does not approve her life style. This results in Cecilie even partying more. She ends up gambling her home away.

Realizing her life style isn't appropriate, Cecilie changes back into a sweet woman. However, she is paralyzed after being hit by a car, while saving a child. It is Peter who heals her.

== Cast ==
- Mae Murray - Circe (mythical goddess)/Cecilie Brunne
- James Kirkwood, Sr. - Dr. Peter Van Martyn
- Tom Ricketts - Archibald Crumm
- Charles K. Gerrard - Ballard 'Bal' Barrett
- William Haines - William Craig
- Lillian Langdon - Sister Agatha
- Gene Cameron - 'Madame' Ducelle (modiste)
