= Christmas Memories (film) =

1915 silent film

The Ruby Circle
- Directed by: Robert Z. Leonard
- Written by: Robert Z. Leonard
- Produced by: Robert Z. Leonard
- Starring: Robert Z. Leonard; Ella Hall; Marc B. Robbins
- Production company: Universal Pictures
- Distributed by: Universal Pictures
- Release date: December 21, 1915
- Running time: 62 minutes
- Country: United States
- Languages: Silent; English intertitles

Christmas Memories is a 1915 American silent drama film directed by Robert Z. Leonard and starring Leonard, Ella Hall and Marc B. Robbins.

== Cast ==
- Robert Z. Leonard as Robert Harding
- Ella Hall as Little Sunshine
- Marc B. Robbinsas Reverend Baker
- Kingsley Benedict as Beppo

== Bibliography ==
- Paul C. Spehr & Gunnar Lundquist. American Film Personnel and Company Credits, 1908-1920. McFarland, 1996.
