= Peacock Alley (1922 film) =

1922 film

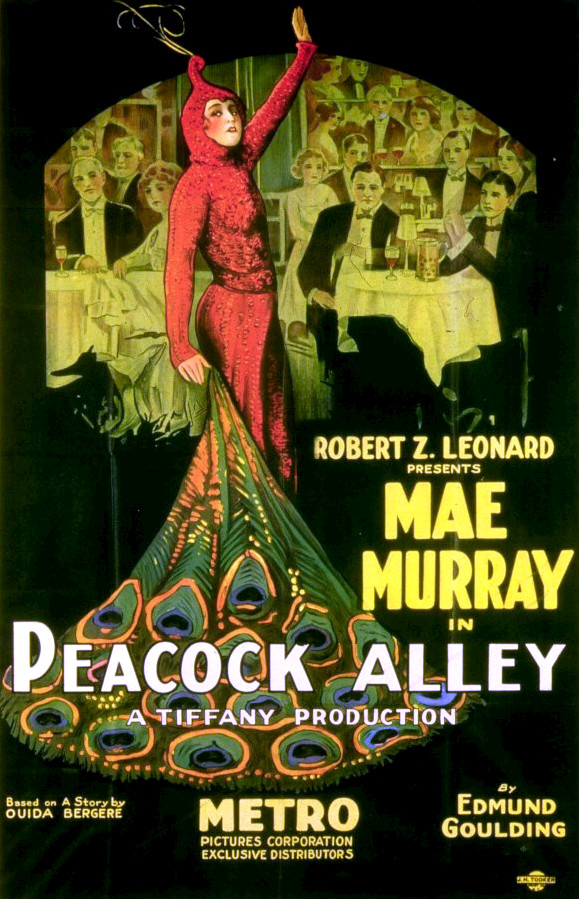
- Poster
- Directed by: Robert Z. Leonard
- Written by: Edmund Goulding; Fanny Hatton (titles); Frederic Hatton (titles)
- Story by: Ouida Bergère
- Produced by: Robert Z. Leonard
- Starring: Mae Murray; Monte Blue
- Cinematography: Oliver T. Marsh
- Production company: Tiffany Productions
- Distributed by: Metro Pictures
- Release date: January 23, 1922
- Running time: 80 minutes
- Country: United States
- Language: Silent (English intertitles)

Peacock Alley is a 1922 American silent drama film starring Monte Blue and Mae Murray. The film was directed by Murray's husband at the time, Robert Z. Leonard. Set design for the film was done by Charles Cadwallader. The film premiered on November 9, 1921 at the Hotel Commodore in New York City.

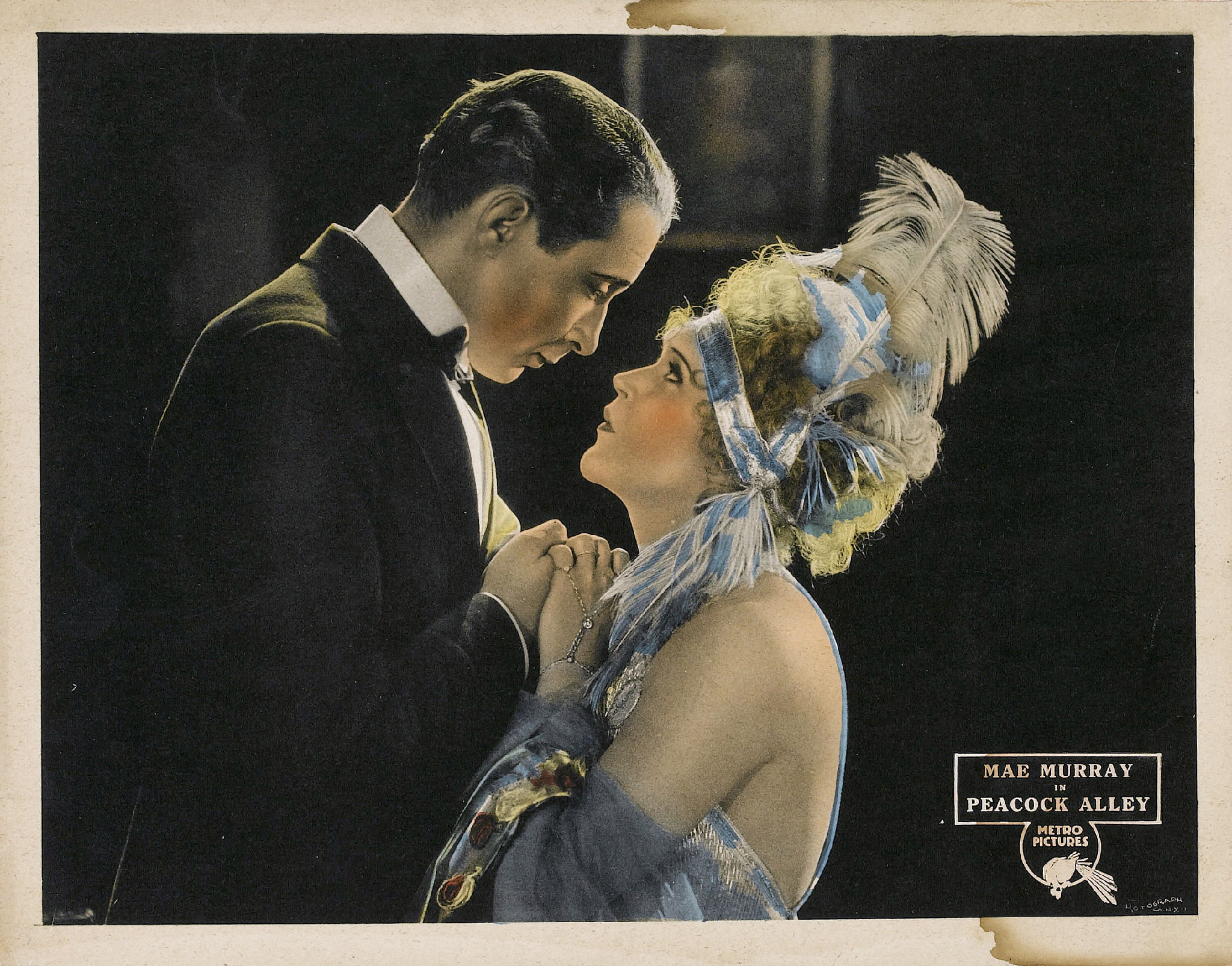
Lobby card

Louis Silvers and Ira Gershwin, writing under his early pen name "Arthur Francis," wrote a song for the film.

== Plot ==
As described in a film magazine, the board of directors for the main manufacturing company in the American village of Harmonville send young Elmer Harmon to Paris to obtain a contract with the French government. In Paris Elmer meets the dancer Cleo of Paris, who casts aside her rich, would-be sweethearts and falls in love with him. When his business affairs appear hopeless, she helps him secure his contract, and the couple are married and return to Harmonville. A gala is given in Elmer's honor for having saved the village's prosperity, and citizens are shocked by Cleo's Parisian fashion. Elmer sells his interests and the couple move to New York City. To give Cleo the luxuries to which she is accustomed, Elmer in a moment of weakness forges his uncle's name and is arrested. Endeavoring to get Elmer out of trouble, Cleo returns to the stage, but in so doing she breaks a promise made to her husband. Elmer is released from jail after promising his uncle to have nothing more to do with Cleo, but then immediately tries to look her up. He finds her in what appears to be a compromising but innocent situation and decides the bad things that have been said about Cleo are true. He returns to Harmonville and the heartbroken Cleo returns to France and seeks seclusion in Normandy. Three years later Elmer finds Cleo there along with her little son who is named for him. They have a reconciliation.

== Cast ==
- Mae Murray as Cleo of Paris
- Monte Blue as Elmer Harmon
- Edmund Lowe as Phil Garrison
- William J. Ferguson as Alex Smith (credited as W.J. Ferguson)
- Anders Randolf as Hugo Fenton (credited as Anders Randolph)
- William H. Tooker as Joseph Carleton (credited as William Tooker)
- Howard Lang as Abner Harmon
- William Frederic as Mayor of Harmontown
- M. Durant as Monsieur Dubois
- Jeffreys Lewis as Toto
- Napoleon the Dog as Napoleon

== Reception ==
The film was one of Murray's most successful films, and one of the biggest hits of 1922. The film was so successful it was the only silent film of Murray's that she remade as the "talkie" Peacock Alley, though major changes were made to the plot.

== Legal case ==
The character "Cleo of Paris" was a parody of Cléo de Mérode. Upon learning of the film and its portrayal of her as a courtesan, de Mérode was unhappy about the portrayal, stating, "I lead and have always led the quietest of lives, I do not seek any publicity, and I really do not wish to be given any against my will, especially that sort of publicity." She went on to attempt to sue the filmmakers for 100,000 francs in damages, alleging that the film injured her reputation and was defamatory. The case was unsuccessful.

== Preservation ==
With no prints of Peacock Alley located in any film archives, it is considered a lost film. In February 2021, the film was cited by the National Film Preservation Board on their Lost U.S. Silent Feature Films list.
