= Fascination (1922 film) =

1922 film

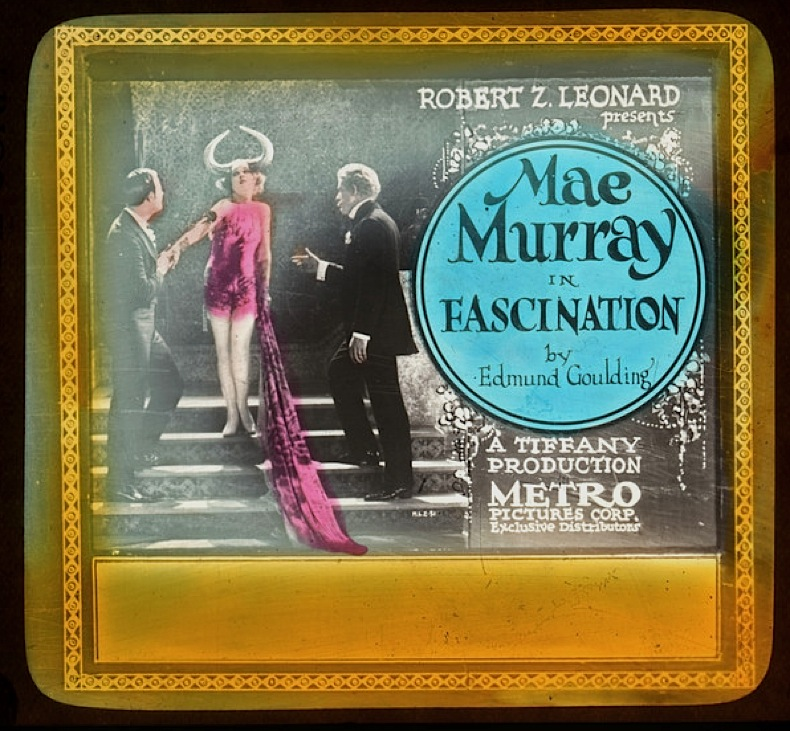
- Lantern slide for the film.
- Directed by: Robert Z. Leonard
- Screenplay by: Edmund Goulding
- Story by: Edmund Goulding
- Produced by: Robert Z. Leonard
- Starring: Mae Murray; Creighton Hale; Helen Ware
- Cinematography: Oliver T. Marsh
- Production company: Tiffany Pictures
- Distributed by: Metro Pictures
- Release date: April 10, 1922
- Running time: 80 minutes
- Country: United States
- Language: Silent (English intertitles)

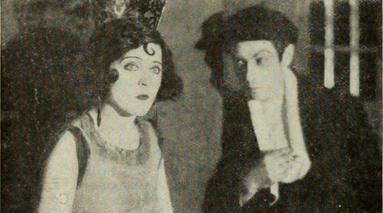
Still with Dolores (Murray) and her father (Hale).

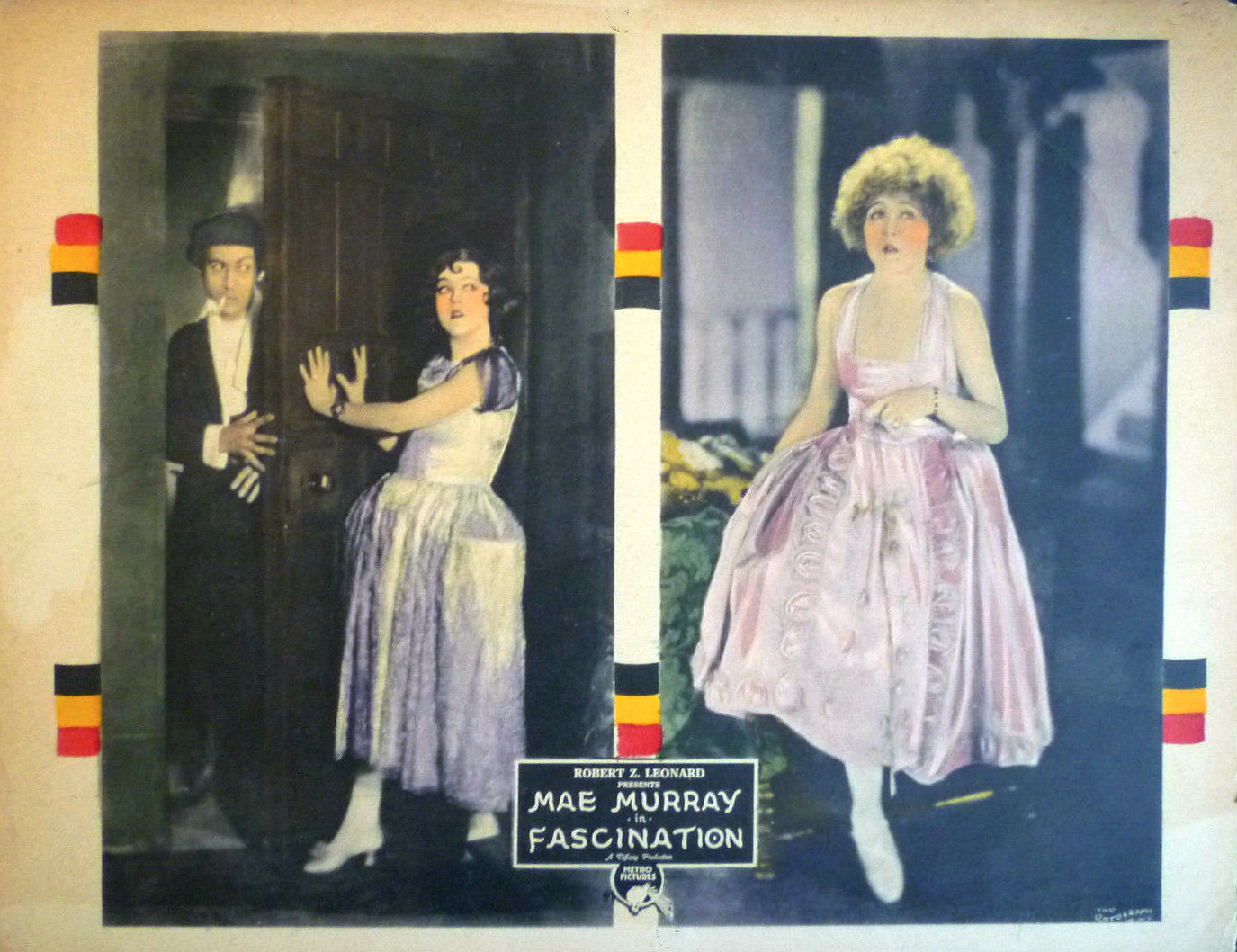
Fascination lobby card

Fascination is a 1922 American silent drama film directed by Robert Z. Leonard and starring his then wife Mae Murray. The film is based on an original story by Edmund Goulding who was soon to be a prolific film director.

The story capitalizes on Murray's continuing forays into outlandish costume dramas.

Louis Silvers composed a song for the film, for which Ira Gershwin, under his early pen name "Arthur Francis," and Schuyler Greene wrote the lyrics. The song is dedicated to Murray.

== Plot ==
As described in a film magazine, Dolores de Lisa (Murray), born of a Spanish father and American mother, combines the warm blood of the South with Yankee pep. To hold her in restraint, her aunt Marquesa (Fitzroy) takes her to Madrid. Dolores slips away from home on Easter day when the streets are filled with crowds going to the bullfight where, after obtaining a wig and costume, she occupies a box. She becomes fascinated with the toreador Carrita (Frazer), and the Count de Morera (Foote) offers to introduce her if she will agree to attend his ball. At the ball Dolores dances for the guests, and then joins a party at a cabaret where she meets the great Carrita. Her family meanwhile is searching the city for her, her father Eduardo de Lisa (Lane), her brother Carlos (Hale), and her sweetheart Ralph Kellogg (Coleman), having just arrived from the United States. Her father enters the cabaret and Parola (Ware), a faded cabaret singer, recognizes him and invites him to her room. Dolores follows them and hears Parola accuse Carlos of being the father of her son. As Carlos turns and starts down the stairs, Parola attempts to kill him with a heavy lamp but Dolores grabs it. Parola then turns on the daughter, but she is saved by the toreador. Parola tells Carrita that Carlos is his father and urges him to avenge her. Carrita leaves and before he can carry out his purpose, Parola admits that she lied and was only attempting to blackmail Carlos, which saves him from death at the hands of the toreador. Dolores arrives home bedraggled and completely cured of her desire for excitement, bullfights, and underworld cabarets. She happily sinks into her American sweetheart's arms.

== Cast ==
- Mae Murray as Dolores de Lisa
- Creighton Hale as Carlos de Lisa
- Charles Lane as Eduardo de Lisa
- Emily Fitzroy as Marquesa de Lisa
- Robert Frazer as Carrita
- Vincent Coleman as Ralph Kellogg
- Courtenay Foote as Count de Morera
- Helen Ware as Parola
- Frank Puglia as Nema

== Preservation ==
With no prints of Fascination located in any film archives, it is considered a lost film.
