= Robert Z. Leonard =

American film director (1889–1968)

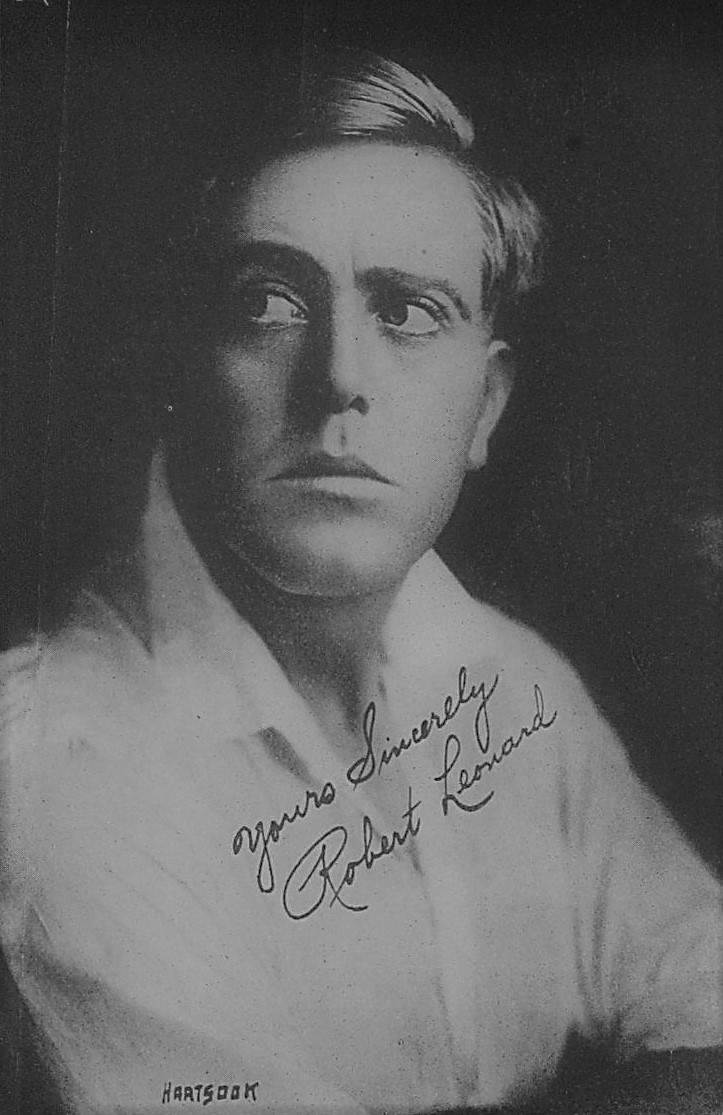
- Leonard in 1915
- Born: Robert Zigler Leonard; October 7, 1889; Chicago, Illinois, U.S.
- Died: August 27, 1968 (aged 78); Beverly Hills, California, U.S.
- Burial place: Forest Lawn Memorial Park, Glendale, California, U.S.
- Occupations: Director, producer, actor, screenwriter
- Years active: 1908–1957
- Spouses: Mae Murray (m. 1918; div. 1925) Gertrude Olmstead (m. 1926)

Robert Zigler Leonard (October 7, 1889 – August 27, 1968) was an American film director, actor, producer, and screenwriter.

== Biography ==
He was born in Chicago, Illinois. At one time, he was married to silent star Mae Murray with the two forming Tiffany Pictures to film eight motion pictures that were released by MGM.

He was nominated for the Academy Award for Best Director for The Divorcee and The Great Ziegfeld. Both were nominated for Best Picture, and the latter won. Known by his nickname Pop, Leonard was brought in late by MGM as a reliable director who could get its Pride and Prejudice (1940), starring Greer Garson and Laurence Olivier, onto the big screen. One of the more unusual credits in his filmography is the film noir thriller The Bribe (1949) with its sleazy settings, slippery characters, and steamy atmosphere.

Robert Leonard died in 1968 in Beverly Hills, California of an aneurysm. He is interred at Forest Lawn Memorial Park, Glendale, near his wife Gertrude Olmstead.

== Legacy ==
On February 8, 1960, Robert Leonard received a star on the Hollywood Walk of Fame for his contribution to the motion picture industry, at 6370 Hollywood Blvd.

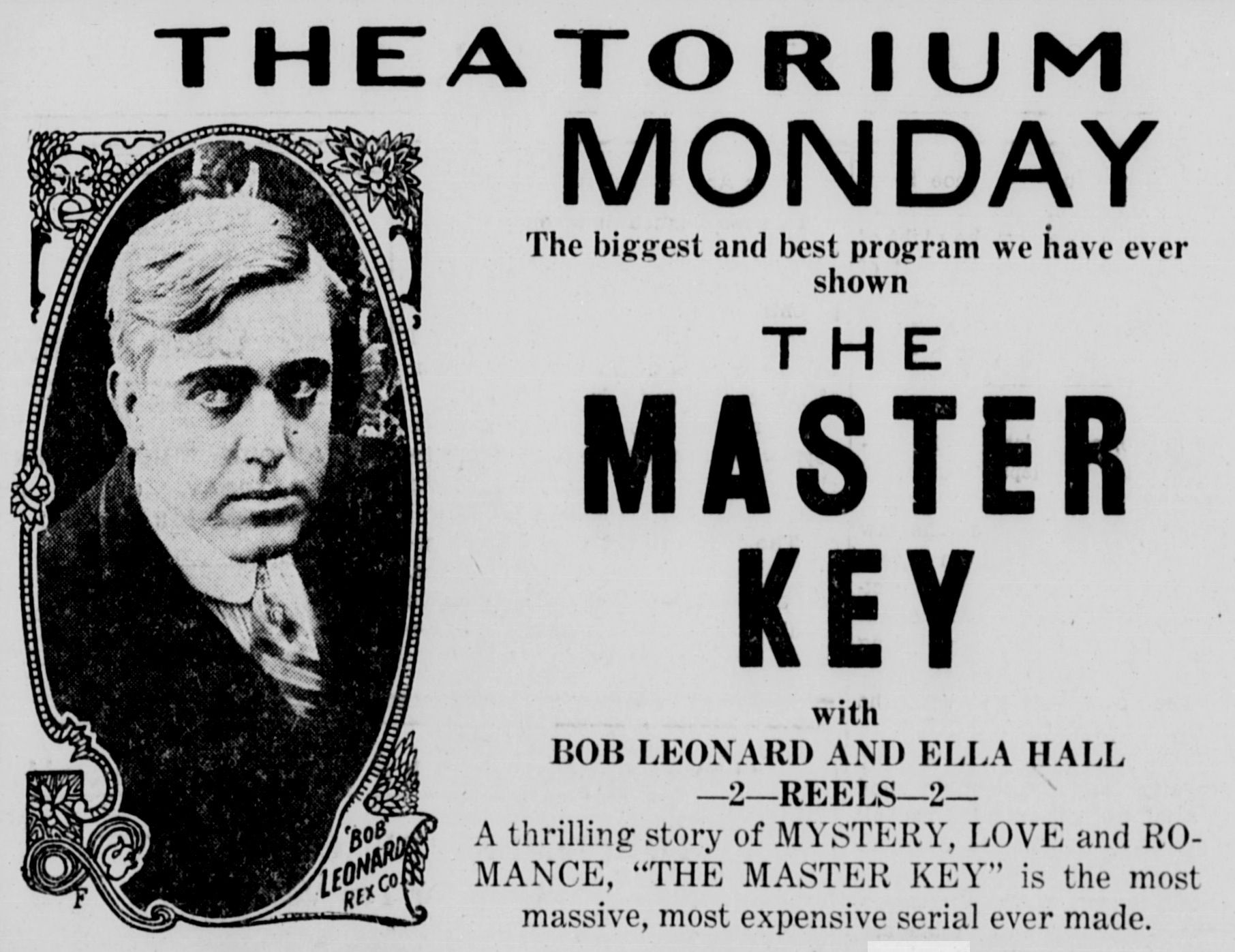
The Master Key [1914].

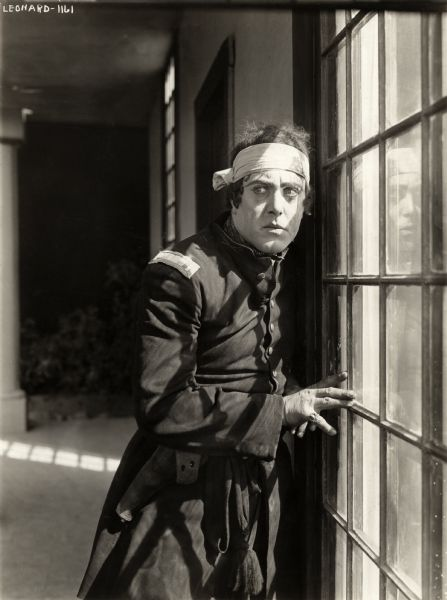
Robert Z. Leonard, costumed as a U.S. Army first lieutenant during the Civil War, pauses by a window in a scene still for the 1915 silent drama Betty's Dream Hero.

== Filmography ==
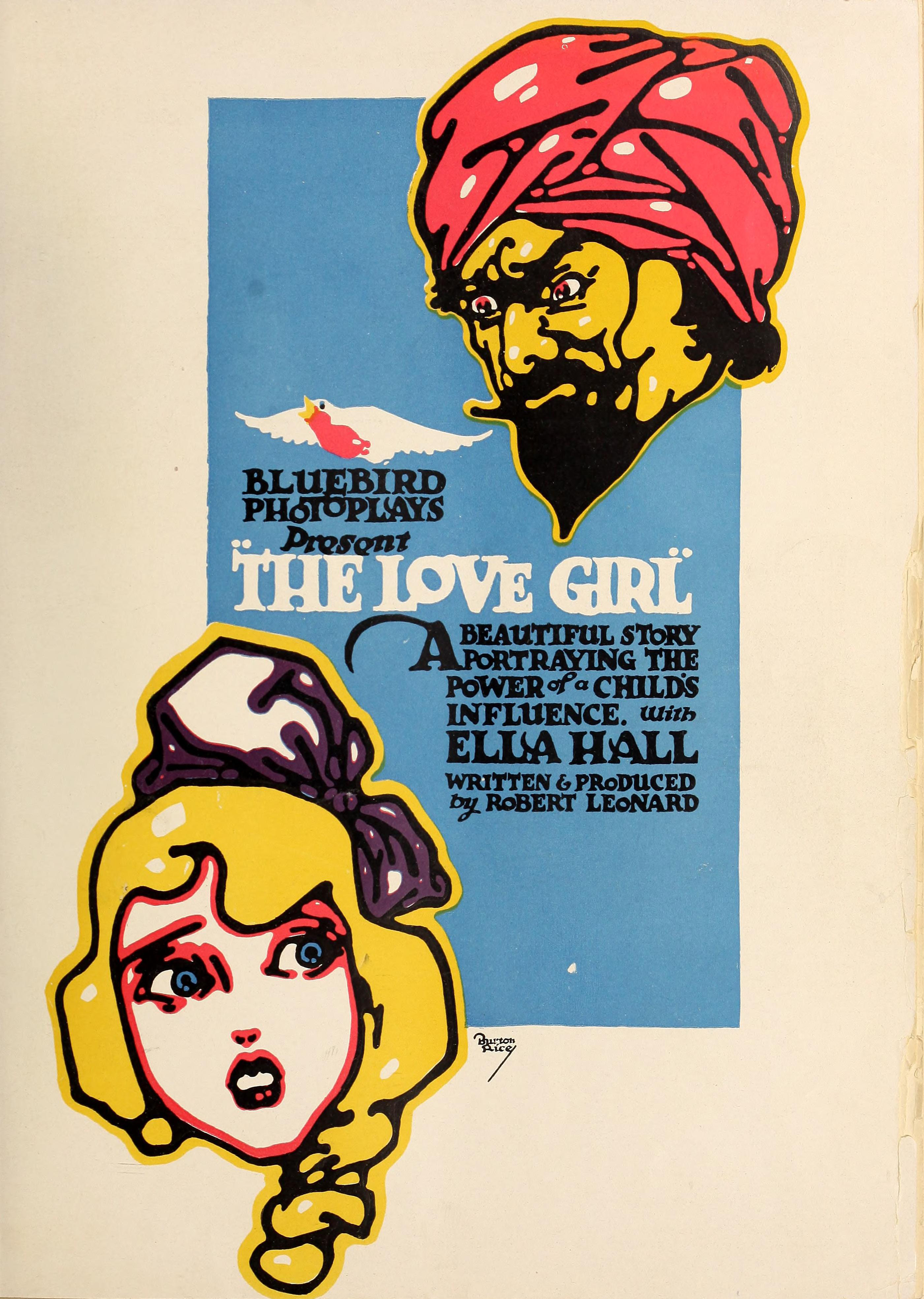
The Love Girl (1916)

=== Director ===
- Sally Scraggs, Housemaid (1913)
- The Ruby Circle (1914)
- The Master Key (1914)
- Christmas Memories (1915)
- Judge Not (1915)
- The Crippled Hand (1916)
- The Plow Girl (1916)
- The Love Girl (1916)
- Little Eve Edgarton (1916)
- The Eagle's Wings (1916)
- Secret Love (1916)
- On Record (1917)
- A Mormon Maid (1917)
- The Primrose Ring (1917)
- At First Sight (1917)
- Princess Virtue (1917)
- The Bride's Awakening (1918)
- Danger, Go Slow (1918)
- Her Body in Bond (1918)
- Face Value (1918)
- Modern Love (1918)
- Big Little Person (1919)
- The Miracle of Love (1919)
- The Scarlet Shadow (1919)
- The Delicious Little Devil (1919)
- The Way of a Woman (1919)
- What Am I Bid? (1919)
- Stronger Than Death (1920)
- April Folly (1920)
- The Restless Sex (1920)
- Heedless Moths (1921)
- The Gilded Lily (1921)
- Peacock Alley (1922)
- Fascination (1922)
- Broadway Rose (1922)
- Jazzmania (1923)
- The French Doll (1923)
- Fashion Row (1923)
- Love's Wilderness (1924)
- Mademoiselle Midnight (1924)
- Circe, the Enchantress (1924)
- Cheaper to Marry (1925)
- Time, the Comedian (1925)
- Bright Lights (1925)
- Dance Madness (1926)
- Mademoiselle Modiste (1926)
- The Waning Sex (1926)
- A Little Journey (1927)
- The Demi-Bride (1927)
- Adam and Evil (1927)
- Tea for Three (1927)
- The Cardboard Lover (1928)
- A Lady of Chance (1928)
- Baby Mine (1928)
- Marianne (1929, silent)
- Marianne (1929, musical)
- In Gay Madrid (1930)
- Let Us Be Gay (1930)
- The Divorcee (1930)
- The Bachelor Father (1931)
- Five and Ten (1931)
- It's a Wise Child (1931)
- Susan Lenox (Her Fall and Rise) (1931)
- The Son-Daughter (1932)
- Strange Interlude (1932)
- Dancing Lady (1933)
- When Ladies Meet (1933)
- Peg o' My Heart (1933)
- Outcast Lady (1934)
- After Office Hours (1935)
- Naughty Marietta (1935)
- Escapade (1935)
- A Tale of Two Cities (1935) (Uncredited fill-in director)
- The Great Ziegfeld (1936)
- Small Town Girl (1936)
- Piccadilly Jim (1936)
- The Firefly (1937)
- Maytime (1937)
- The Girl of the Golden West (1938)
- Broadway Serenade (1939)
- New Moon (1940)
- Pride and Prejudice (1940)
- Third Finger, Left Hand (1940)
- Ziegfeld Girl (1941)
- When Ladies Meet (1941)
- Stand by for Action (1942)
- We Were Dancing (1942)
- The Man from Down Under (1943)
- Marriage Is a Private Affair (1944)
- Week-End at the Waldorf (1945)
- The Secret Heart (1946)
- Cynthia (1947)
- B.F.'s Daughter (1948)
- In the Good Old Summertime (1949)
- The Bribe (1949)
- Duchess of Idaho (1950)
- Nancy Goes to Rio (1950)
- Grounds for Marriage (1951)
- Too Young to Kiss (1951)
- Everything I Have Is Yours (1952)
- The Clown (1953)
- The Great Diamond Robbery (1953)
- Her Twelve Men (1954)
- Beautiful But Dangerous (1955)
- The King's Thief (1955) (replaced Hugo Fregonese during filming)
- Kelly and Me (1957)

=== Actor ===
- The Sea Urchin (1913)
- Shon the Piper (1913)
- Sally Scraggs, Housemaid (1913)
- The Ruby Circle (1914)
- Christmas Memories (1915)
- The Crippled Hand (1916)
- Married Flirts (1924)
- Show People (1928)
- The Firefly (1937)
- Abbott and Costello in Hollywood (1945, cameo scene with Lucille Ball and Preston Foster)
