= Danger, Go Slow =

1918 film

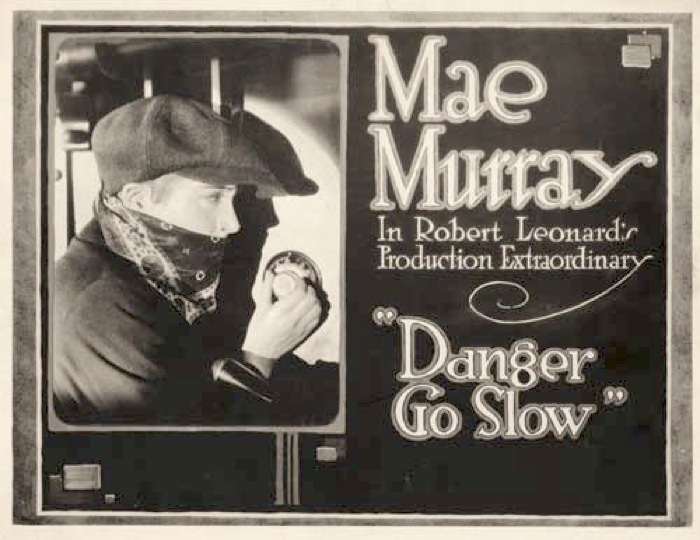
- Lobby card
- Directed by: Robert Z. Leonard
- Written by: Robert Z. Leonard; Mae Murray
- Produced by: Universal Special
- Starring: Mae Murray; Jack Mulhall; Lon Chaney
- Cinematography: Allen G. Siegler
- Distributed by: Universal Film Manufacturing Company
- Release date: December 16, 1918
- Running time: 6 reels (60 minutes)
- Country: United States
- Language: Silent (English intertitles)

Danger, Go Slow is a lost 1918 American silent comedy film directed by Robert Z. Leonard, and starring Mae Murray, Jack Mulhall and Lon Chaney. Robert Z. Leonard and Mae Murray co-wrote the screenplay together.

The film was in production from late March until late April 1918, but it was only released in December of that year. Chaney had a fairly small role in the film as an oil prospector. When he made this film, he was preparing to leave Universal over a salary dispute and he moved over to Paramount soon after to appear in their 1918 western film Riddle Gawne.

== Plot ==
Muggsy Mulane, a female crook who masquerades as a boy, jumps a freight train to the country after Jimmy the Eel, the leader of Muggsy's criminal gang, is arrested. Muggsy gets off at Cottonville and a railroad cop chases her away from the station. In the village of Cottonville, she sees a sign that says "Danger - Go Slow" and Muggsy takes it as an omen and decides to settle down in the small country town. Muggsy befriends a woman named Aunt Sarah, whom she later discovers is Jimmy's mother when she sees a photo of him on Sarah's desk. At first, Sarah thinks Muggsy is a boy, but Muggsy reveals her true gender to the friendly old woman.

When Muggsy learns that the greedy Judge Cotton, who holds the mortgage on Aunt Sarah's property, is planning to foreclose, she robs the judge's safe to get Sarah the money she needs, but Aunt Sarah makes her put it back. (The film's poster shows Muggsy, dressed as a boy, robbing the Judge's safe.)

Later, the judge tries to molest Muggsy and she threatens to expose his lecherous behavior to all of the townspeople if he doesn't let Aunt Sarah off the hook. The judge relents out of embarrassment, releasing Aunt Sarah from her financial obligations. Soon after, Muggsy sells a portion of Aunt Sarah's farm property to an oil prospector named Bud (Lon Chaney) for $10,000.00, far more than it is worth. Aunt Sarah uses part of the money to legally pay off her mortgage, since she wants to pay her debts in a proper fashion.

After a year has passed, Muggsy travels back to the big city and greets Jimmy the Eel as he is being released from prison. She convinces Jimmy to come back home to Cottonville and be reunited with his mother. Meanwhile, Bud convinces his oil company to pay Aunt Sarah an additional $40,000.00 for the remainder of her land, making Sarah a wealthy old woman. Muggsy and Jimmy get married and decide to settle down in Cottonville permanently.

== Cast ==
- Mae Murray as Mugsy Mulane
- Jack Mulhall as Jimmy, the Eel
- Lydia Knott as Aunt Sarah
- Joseph W. Girard as Judge Cotton
- Lon Chaney as Bud, an oil prospector
- Alfred Allen as Silent Jake (uncredited)
- Frank Brownlee as Bill (uncredited)
- Richard Cummings as the Sheriff (uncredited)
- Hoot Gibson as ?? (uncredited)
- Martha Mattox as Mrs. Pruddy (uncredited)
- Evelyn Selbie as Miss Witherspoon (uncredited)

== Reception ==
"Even with a pronounced lack of plausibility in the later incidents, the story may be put down as abundantly entertaining. It has humor and pathos and some excellent character work, and should have very general appeal." ---Moving Picture World

"Here is a feature that starts like a whale, but when it is about half finished takes a header into the briney and stays there...If the picture had held the pace that it hit during the first reel and a half, it would have either developed into an Alias Jimmy Valentine or a Turn to the Right... The photography should be given special mention. Some of the shots are particularly excellent." ---Variety

Motion Picture News gave the following advice to exhibitors on how to sell the picture: "Keep all of your advertising essentially human. People like to see pictures with real Americans in them and this takes you from the thieves of the big city to the purity of the best people of a country town. There is nothing sensational about the production, but you can give it a general appeal to every member of the family if you will get the spirit of it first, for it is a heart interesting story of environment, the influence of good associations. But don't say that. The minute that you spring such words as "regeneration" and "environment" on your patrons a lot of them conclude that it is some sort of a problem play and stay away." ---Motion Picture News

== Preservation ==
With no holdings located in archives, Danger, Go Slow is considered a lost film.
