= Clarissa Selwynne =

British actress (1886–1948)

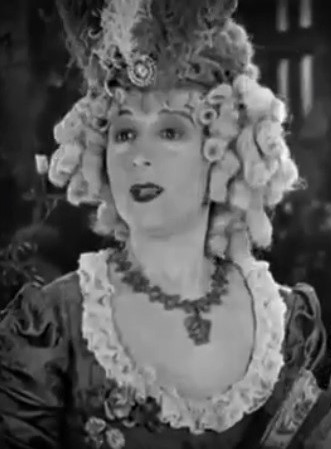
- Selwynne in Beau Brummel (1924)
- Born: 26 February 1886; London, England, UK
- Died: 13 June 1948 (aged 62); Los Angeles, California, U.S.
- Other name: Clarissa Schultz
- Occupation: Actress
- Years active: 1913–1937

Clarissa Selwynne (26 February 1886 – 13 June 1948) was a British stage and film actress. She settled in the United States, working in Hollywood where she appeared in around 100 films.

== Partial filmography ==
- Hearts in Exile (1915)
- The Master Hand (1915)
- The Masked Rider (1916)
- The Curse of Eve (1917)
- The Double Standard (1917)
- Princess Virtue (1917)
- The Wax Model (1917)
- Smashing Through (1918)
- The White Man's Law (1918)
- The Talk of the Town (1918)
- The Black Gate (1919)
- Bonnie, Bonnie Lassie (1919)
- Girls (1919)
- The Parisian Tigress (1919)
- The Scarlet Shadow (1919)
- Out of the Storm (1920)
- The Cup of Fury (1920)
- Society Secrets (1921)
- Queenie (1921)
- Straight from Paris (1921)
- The Lure of Jade (1921)
- Up and at 'Em (1922)
- You Can't Get Away with It (1923)
- The Brass Bottle (1923)
- Black Oxen (1923)
- Why Women Remarry (1923)
- One Glorious Night (1924)
- Secrets (1924)
- Beau Brummel (1924)
- Mademoiselle Midnight (1924)
- The Dangerous Flirt (1924)
- The Last Man on Earth (1924)
- We Moderns (1925)
- Broadway Lady (1925)
- Infatuation (1925)
- The Fate of a Flirt (1925)
- High Steppers (1926)
- Quarantined Rivals (1927)
- Naughty but Nice (1927)
- The Devil Dancer (1927)
- Jazz Mad (1928)
- The Heart of a Follies Girl (1928)
- Sinner's Parade (1928)
- My Man (1928)
- Confessions of a Wife (1928)
- Hard to Get (1929)
- The Isle of Lost Ships (1929)
- The Love Trap (1929)
- Lilies of the Field (1930)
- Slightly Married (1932)
- My Pal, the King (1932)
- Cynara (1932)
- Jane Eyre (1934)
- Melody of My Heart (1936)
- Everything Is Rhythm (1936)
- One Good Turn (1936)
- Sporting Love (1936)
- Everything in Life (1936)
- Call It a Day (1937)
- Women of Glamour (1937)

== Bibliography ==
- Lynn Kear and James King. Evelyn Brent: The Life and Films of Hollywood's Lady Crook. McFarland, 2009.
