= List of American films of 1933 =

American films released in 1933

More than 507 American feature films were released in 1933. Hollywood was dominated by the eight major studios Fox Film, MGM, Paramount, RKO, Warner Brothers, Columbia Pictures, Universal Pictures and United Artists. Cavalcade won Best Picture at the Academy Awards.

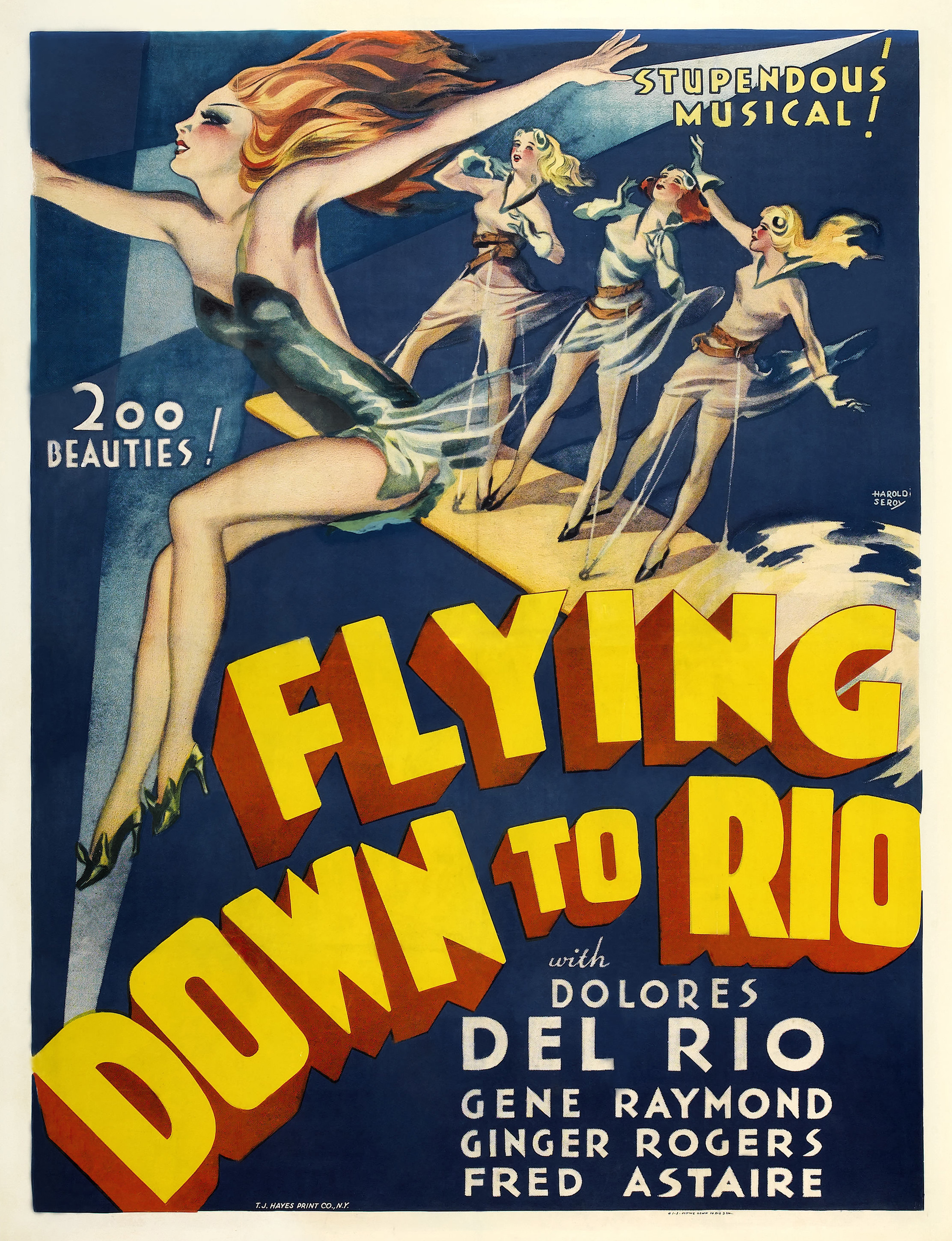
Flying Down to Rio directed by Thornton Freeland and featuring Dolores del Río, Ginger Rogers and Fred Astaire.

== A-B ==
Title	Director	Featured Cast	Genre	Note
42nd Street	Lloyd Bacon	Warner Baxter, Bebe Daniels, George Brent, Una Merkel, Ruby Keeler, Guy Kibbee, Ginger Rogers, Dick Powell, Ned Sparks, George E. Stone, Allen Jenkins	Musical	Warner Bros.
Above the Clouds	Roy William Neill	Robert Armstrong, Richard Cromwell, Dorothy Wilson	Drama	Columbia
Ace of Aces	J. Walter Ruben	Richard Dix, Elizabeth Allan, Ralph Bellamy	Drama, War	RKO
Adorable	William Dieterle	Janet Gaynor, Herbert Mundin, Sterling Holloway	Musical	Fox Film
Advice to the Lovelorn	Alfred L. Werker	Lee Tracy, Sally Blane, Paul Harvey, Sterling Holloway, C. Henry Gordon, Isabel Jewell	Drama	United Artists
After Tonight	George Archainbaud	Constance Bennett, Gilbert Roland	Spy	RKO
Aggie Appleby, Maker of Men	Mark Sandrich	Charles Farrell, Wynne Gibson, William Gargan, ZaSu Pitts, Betty Furness, Blanche Friderici	Comedy	RKO
Air Hostess	Albert S. Rogell	Evalyn Knapp, James Murray, Arthur Pierson	Drama	Columbia
Alice in Wonderland	Norman Z. McLeod	Charlotte Henry, Richard Arlen, Roscoe Ates, Gary Cooper, Leon Errol, Louise Fazenda, W. C. Fields, Richard "Skeets" Gallagher, Cary Grant, Raymond Hatton, Edward Everett Horton, Roscoe Karns, Baby LeRoy, Mae Marsh, Polly Moran, Jack Oakie, Edna May Oliver, May Robson, Charlie Ruggles, Alison Skipworth, Ned Sparks, Ford Sterling	Fantasy	Paramount
Alimony Madness	B. Reeves Eason	Helen Chandler, Leon Ames, Edward Earle	Drama	Independent
Ann Carver's Profession	Edward Buzzell	Fay Wray, Gene Raymond, Claire Dodd	Drama	Columbia
Ann Vickers	John Cromwell	Irene Dunne, Walter Huston	Drama	RKO
Another Language	Edward H. Griffith	Robert Montgomery, Helen Hayes, Louise Closser Hale	Romance	MGM
Arizona to Broadway	James Tinling	James Dunn, Joan Bennett, Herbert Mundin, Gene Malin	Crime	Fox Film
As the Devil Commands	Roy William Neill	Alan Dinehart, Mae Clarke, Neil Hamilton	Mystery	Columbia
The Avenger	Edwin L. Marin	Ralph Forbes, Adrienne Ames, Arthur Vinton	Drama, Crime	Monogram
Baby Face	Alfred E. Green	Barbara Stanwyck, George Brent	Drama	Warner Bros.
The Barbarian	Sam Wood	Ramon Novarro, Myrna Loy	Adventure	MGM
Beauty for Sale	Richard Boleslawski	Madge Evans, Alice Brady, Otto Kruger, Una Merkel	Drama	MGM
Bed of Roses	Gregory La Cava, Charles Kerr	Constance Bennett, Joel McCrea, Pert Kelton	Drama	RKO
A Bedtime Story	Norman Taurog	Maurice Chevalier, Helen Twelvetrees, Edward Everett Horton	Musical	Paramount
Before Dawn	Irving Pichel	Stuart Erwin, Dorothy Wilson, Warner Oland, Dudley Digges, Gertrude Hoffmann	Drama	RKO
Before Midnight	Lambert Hillyer	Ralph Bellamy, June Collyer, Claude Gillingwater	Mystery	Columbia
Before Morning	Arthur Hoerl	Leo Carrillo, Lora Baxter, Taylor Holmes	Drama	Independent
Below the Sea	Albert S. Rogell	Fay Wray, Ralph Bellamy	Drama	Columbia
Berkeley Square	Frank Lloyd	Leslie Howard, Heather Angel	Fantasy	Fox Film
Best of Enemies	Rian James	Buddy Rogers, Marian Nixon, Greta Nissen	Comedy	Fox Film
The Big Bluff	Reginald Denny	Reginald Denny, Claudia Dell, Donald Keith	Comedy	Independent
The Big Brain	George Archainbaud	Phillips Holmes, Fay Wray, George E. Stone	Drama	RKO
The Big Chance	Albert Herman	John Darrow, Mickey Rooney, Natalie Moorhead	Drama, Crime	Independent
The Big Cage	Kurt Neumann	Clyde Beatty, Anita Page, Mickey Rooney	Drama	Universal
Big Executive	Erle C. Kenton	Ricardo Cortez, Sharon Lynn, Richard Bennett	Drama	Paramount
Big Time or Bust	Sam Newfield	Regis Toomey, Gloria Shea, Walter Byron	Drama	Independent
The Billion Dollar Scandal	Harry Joe Brown	Robert Armstrong, Constance Cummings, Frank Morgan	Drama	Paramount
The Bitter Tea of General Yen	Frank Capra	Barbara Stanwyck, Nils Asther, Toshia Mori	Drama, War	Columbia
Black Beauty	Phil Rosen	Esther Ralston, Alexander Kirkland, Hale Hamilton	Drama	Monogram
Blind Adventure	Ernest B. Schoedsack	Robert Armstrong, Helen Mack, Roland Young	Mystery	RKO
Blondie Johnson	Ray Enright	Joan Blondell, Chester Morris, Allen Jenkins	Drama	Warner Bros.
Blood Money	Rowland Brown	George Bancroft, Judith Anderson, Frances Dee	Drama, Crime	United Artists
Bombshell	Victor Fleming	Jean Harlow, Lee Tracy, Franchot Tone	Comedy, Drama	MGM
Bondage	Alfred Santell	Dorothy Jordan, Alexander Kirkland, Merle Tottenham	Drama	Fox Film
The Bowery	Raoul Walsh	Wallace Beery, George Raft, Jackie Cooper, Fay Wray	Comedy, Drama	United Artists
Breed of the Border	Robert N. Bradbury	Bob Steele, Marion Byron, Ernie Adams	Western	Monogram
Brief Moment	David Burton	Carole Lombard, Gene Raymond, Donald Cook	Drama	Columbia
Broadway Bad	Sidney Lanfield	Joan Blondell, Ricardo Cortez, Ginger Rogers	Drama	Fox Film
Broadway Through a Keyhole	Lowell Sherman	Constance Cummings, Russ Columbo, Gregory Ratoff	Musical	United Artists
Broadway to Hollywood	Willard Mack	Alice Brady, Frank Morgan, Madge Evans	Musical	MGM
Broken Dreams	Robert G. Vignola	Randolph Scott, Martha Sleeper, Joseph Cawthorn	Drama	Monogram
Bureau of Missing Persons	Roy Del Ruth	Bette Davis, Pat O'Brien, Glenda Farrell	Drama	Warner Bros.
By Appointment Only	Frank R. Strayer	Aileen Pringle, Lew Cody, Sally O'Neil	Drama	Chesterfield

== C-D ==
Title	Director	Featured Cast	Genre	Note
The California Trail	Lambert Hillyer	Buck Jones, Helen Mack, Luis Alberni	Western	Columbia
By Candlelight	James Whale	Elissa Landi, Paul Lukas, Nils Asther	Comedy	Universal
Captured!	Roy Del Ruth	Leslie Howard, Douglas Fairbanks Jr., Margaret Lindsay	Drama, War	Warner Bros.
Carnival Lady	Howard Higgin	Boots Mallory, Allen Vincent, Gertrude Astor	Drama	Independent
Cavalcade	Frank Lloyd	Clive Brook, Diana Wynyard, Beryl Mercer	Drama, War	Fox Film
Central Airport	William A. Wellman	Richard Barthelmess, James Murray, Sally Eilers	Drama	Warner Bros.
Chance at Heaven	William A. Seiter	Ginger Rogers, Joel McCrea, Marian Nixon	Drama	RKO
Charlie Chan's Greatest Case	Hamilton MacFadden	Warner Oland, Heather Angel	Mystery	Fox Film
Cheating Blondes	Joseph Levering	Thelma Todd, Inez Courtney, Mae Busch	Mystery	Majestic
The Cheyenne Kid	Robert F. Hill	Tom Keene, Roscoe Ates, Otto Hoffman	Western	RKO
The Chief	Charles Reisner	Ed Wynn, Dorothy Mackaill, Charles Sale	Comedy	MGM
Child of Manhattan	Edward Buzzell	Nancy Carroll, John Boles, Buck Jones	Drama	Columbia
Christopher Bean	Sam Wood	Marie Dressler, Lionel Barrymore, Helen Mack	Comedy	MGM
Christopher Strong	Dorothy Arzner	Katharine Hepburn, Colin Clive, Helen Chandler	Drama	RKO
The Circus Queen Murder	Roy William Neill	Adolphe Menjou, Donald Cook, Greta Nissen	Mystery	Columbia
Clear All Wires!	George Hill	Lee Tracy, Benita Hume, Una Merkel	Comedy	MGM
Cocktail Hour	Roy Mack	Randolph Scott, Bebe Daniels, Sidney Blackmer	Drama, Romance	Columbia
The Cohens and Kellys in Trouble	George Stevens	Charles Murray, Andy Devine, Maureen O'Sullivan	Comedy	Universal
College Coach	William A. Wellman	Dick Powell, Ann Dvorak, Pat O'Brien	Drama	Warner Bros.
College Humor	Wesley Ruggles	Bing Crosby, Jack Oakie, Richard Arlen, Mary Carlisle	Musical comedy	Paramount
The Constant Woman	Victor Schertzinger	Conrad Nagel, Leila Hyams, Claire Windsor	Drama, Romance	Sono-Art
Convention City	Archie Mayo	Joan Blondell, Dick Powell, Mary Astor	Comedy	Warner Bros.
Corruption	Charles E. Roberts	Preston Foster, Tully Marshall, Evalyn Knapp	Crime	Independent
Counsellor at Law	William Wyler	John Barrymore, Bebe Daniels, Doris Kenyon	Drama	Universal
Cradle Song	Mitchell Leisen	Dorothea Wieck, Evelyn Venable, Guy Standing	Drama	Paramount
The Crime of the Century	William Beaudine	Jean Hersholt, Wynne Gibson, Frances Dee	Drama, Mystery	Paramount
Cross Fire	Otto Brower	Tom Keene, Betty Furness, Edgar Kennedy	Western	RKO
Curtain at Eight	E. Mason Hopper	C. Aubrey Smith, Dorothy Mackaill, Paul Cavanagh	Mystery	Majestic
Damaged Lives	Edgar G. Ulmer	Harry Myers, Marceline Day, Jason Robards Sr.	Drama	Columbia
Dance Girl Dance	Frank R. Strayer	Alan Dinehart, Evalyn Knapp, Edward Nugent	Musical	Chesterfield
Dance Hall Hostess	B. Reeves Eason	Helen Chandler, Jason Robards Sr., Alberta Vaughn	Drama	Independent
Dancing Lady	Robert Z. Leonard	Joan Crawford, Clark Gable, Fred Astaire	Comedy, Musical	MGM
Dangerous Crossroads	Lambert Hillyer	Jackie Searl, Charles Sale, Frank Albertson	Crime	Columbia
Dangerously Yours	Frank Tuttle	Warner Baxter, Miriam Jordan, Herbert Mundin	Comedy	Fox Film
Daring Daughters	Christy Cabanne	Marian Marsh, Kenneth Thomson, Bert Roach	Comedy, Drama	Independent
Day of Reckoning	Charles Brabin	Richard Dix, Una Merkel, Stuart Erwin	Drama	MGM
Deadwood Pass	J. P. McGowan	Tom Tyler, Lafe McKee, Slim Whitaker	Western	Independent
Deluge	Felix E. Feist	Peggy Shannon, Sidney Blackmer, Lois Wilson	Science fiction	RKO
Design for Living	Ernst Lubitsch	Fredric March, Gary Cooper, Miriam Hopkins	Comedy, Romance	Paramount
Destination Unknown	Tay Garnett	Pat O'Brien, Ralph Bellamy, Alan Hale	Drama	Universal
The Devil's Brother	Hal Roach	Stan Laurel, Oliver Hardy, Thelma Todd	Comedy	MGM
The Devil's in Love	William Dieterle	Loretta Young, Victor Jory, Vivienne Osborne	Drama, Romance	Fox Film
The Devil's Mate	Phil Rosen	Peggy Shannon, Preston Foster, Hobart Cavanaugh	Mystery	Monogram
Diamond Trail	Harry L. Fraser	Rex Bell, Frances Rich, Lloyd Whitlock	Western	Monogram
Dinner at Eight	George Cukor	John Barrymore, Wallace Beery, Jean Harlow	Comedy, Drama	MGM
Diplomaniacs	William A. Seiter	Bert Wheeler, Robert Woolsey, Marjorie White	Comedy	RKO
Disgraced!	Erle C. Kenton	Helen Twelvetrees, Bruce Cabot, Adrienne Ames	Mystery	Paramount
Doctor Bull	John Ford	Will Rogers, Marian Nixon, Berton Churchill	Comedy	Fox Film
Don't Bet on Love	Murray Roth	Lew Ayres, Ginger Rogers, Shirley Grey	Comedy	Universal
Double Harness	John Cromwell	Ann Harding, William Powell, Lilian Bond	Comedy drama	RKO
Drum Taps	J.P. McGowan	Ken Maynard, Charles Stevens, Junior Coghlan	Western	Sono-Art
Duck Soup	Leo McCarey	Groucho Marx, Harpo Marx, Chico Marx, Zeppo Marx, Margaret Dumont, Louis Calhern, Raquel Torres, Edgar Kennedy	Comedy	Paramount

== E-F ==
Title	Director	Featured Cast	Genre	Note
The Eagle and the Hawk	Stuart Walker	Fredric March, Cary Grant, Carole Lombard	Drama, War	Paramount
East of Fifth Avenue	Albert S. Rogell	Wallace Ford, Mary Carlisle, Walter Connolly	Drama	Columbia
Easy Millions	Fred C. Newmeyer	Richard 'Skeets' Gallagher, Dorothy Burgess	Comedy	Independent
The Eleventh Commandment	George Melford	Marian Marsh, Theodore von Eltz, Alan Hale	Drama	Allied Pictures
Elmer, the Great	Mervyn LeRoy	Joe E. Brown, Patricia Ellis, Frank McHugh	Comedy	Warner Bros.
Emergency Call	Edward L. Cahn	William Boyd, Wynne Gibson, Betty Furness	Drama	RKO
The Emperor Jones	Dudley Murphy	Paul Robeson, Frank H. Wilson, Dudley Digges	Drama	United Artists
Employees' Entrance	Roy Del Ruth	Loretta Young, Warren William, Wallace Ford	Drama	Warner Bros.
Eskimo	W. S. Van Dyke	Ray Mala, Lotus Long, Edward Hearn	Adventure	MGM
Ever in My Heart	Archie Mayo	Barbara Stanwyck, Otto Kruger, Ralph Bellamy	Drama	Warner Bros.
Ex-Lady	Robert Florey	Bette Davis, Gene Raymond, Claire Dodd	Comedy	Warner Bros.
Face in the Sky	Harry Lachman	Spencer Tracy, Marian Nixon, Stuart Erwin	Comedy, Musical	Fox Film
Fargo Express	Alan James	Ken Maynard, Helen Mack, Paul Fix	Western	Sono-Art
Fast Workers	Tod Browning	John Gilbert, Robert Armstrong, Mae Clarke	Drama	MGM
Female	Michael Curtiz	Ruth Chatterton, George Brent, Lois Wilson	Comedy, Drama	Warner Bros.
The Fiddlin' Buckaroo	Ken Maynard	Ken Maynard, Gloria Shea, Fred Kohler	Western	Universal
The Fighting Code	Lambert Hillyer	Buck Jones, Diane Sinclair, Ward Bond	Western	Columbia
The Fighting Parson	Harry L. Fraser	Hoot Gibson, Marceline Day, Stanley Blystone	Western	Allied Pictures
Fighting Texans	Armand Schaefer	Rex Bell, Luana Walters, Betty Mack	Western	Monogram
File 113	Chester M. Franklin	Lew Cody, Mary Nolan, Clara Kimball Young	Mystery	Allied Pictures
Flaming Gold	Ralph Ince	William Boyd, Pat O'Brien, Mae Clarke	Drama	RKO
Flying Devils	Russell Birdwell	Bruce Cabot, Arline Judge, Ralph Bellamy	Action	RKO
Flying Down to Rio	Thornton Freeland	Dolores del Río, Fred Astaire, Ginger Rogers	Musical	RKO
Fog	Albert S. Rogell	Mary Brian, Reginald Denny, Donald Cook	Mystery	Columbia
Footlight Parade	Lloyd Bacon	James Cagney, Joan Blondell, Ruby Keeler	Comedy, Musical	Warner Bros.
Forgotten	Richard Thorpe	Lee Kohlmar, June Clyde, William Collier Jr.	Drama	Chesterfield
Found Alive	Charles Hutchison	Barbara Bedford, Maurice Murphy, Robert Frazer	Drama	Independent
From Headquarters	William Dieterle	George Brent, Margaret Lindsay, Eugene Pallette	Mystery	Warner Bros.
From Hell to Heaven	Erle C. Kenton	Carole Lombard, Jack Oakie, Adrienne Ames	Drama	Paramount
The Fugitive	Harry L. Fraser	Rex Bell, Cecilia Parker, Bob Kortman	Western	Monogram
Fury of the Jungle	Roy William Neill	Donald Cook, Peggy Shannon, Dudley Digges	Adventure	Columbia

== G-H ==
Title	Director	Featured Cast	Genre	Note
Gabriel Over the White House	Gregory La Cava	Walter Huston, Franchot Tone, Karen Morley	Drama	MGM
The Gallant Fool	Robert N. Bradbury	Bob Steele, Arletta Duncan, Theodore Lorch	Western	Monogram
Galloping Romeo	Robert N. Bradbury	Bob Steele, Doris Hill, George "Gabby" Hayes	Western	Monogram
Gambling Ship	Max Marcin	Cary Grant, Jack La Rue, Benita Hume	Comedy, Drama	Paramount
Gigolettes of Paris	Alphonse Martell	Madge Bellamy, Gilbert Roland, Natalie Moorhead	Drama	Majestic
The Girl in 419	Alexander Hall	James Dunn, Gloria Stuart, David Manners	Drama	Paramount
Girl Missing	Robert Florey	Glenda Farrell, Mary Brian, Ben Lyon	Comedy	Warner Bros.
Girl Without a Room	Ralph Murphy	Charles Ruggles, Marguerite Churchill, Charles Farrell	Comedy	Paramount
Going Hollywood	Raoul Walsh	Bing Crosby, Marion Davies, Ned Sparks	Comedy, Musical	MGM
Gold Diggers of 1933	Mervyn LeRoy	Warren William, Ginger Rogers, Joan Blondell	Musical	Warner Bros.
Golden Harvest	Ralph Murphy	Richard Arlen, Genevieve Tobin, Chester Morris	Drama	Paramount
Goldie Gets Along	Malcolm St. Clair	Lili Damita, Charles Morton, Sam Hardy	Comedy	RKO
Goodbye Again	Michael Curtiz	Warren William, Joan Blondell, Genevieve Tobin	Comedy	Warner Bros.
Goodbye Love	H. Bruce Humberstone	Charles Ruggles, Verree Teasdale, Phyllis Barry	Comedy	RKO
Grand Slam	William Dieterle	Loretta Young, Paul Lukas, Frank McHugh	Comedy, Romance	Warner Bros.
The Great Jasper	J. Walter Ruben	Richard Dix, Edna May Oliver, Wera Engels	Drama	RKO
Gun Justice	Alan James	Ken Maynard, Cecilia Parker, Hooper Atchley	Western	Universal
Gun Law	Lewis D. Collins	Jack Hoxie, Betty Boyd, Mary Carr	Western	Majestic
Hallelujah, I'm a Bum	Lewis Milestone	Al Jolson, Madge Evans, Frank Morgan	Musical	United Artists
Hard to Handle	Mervyn LeRoy	James Cagney, Mary Brian, Allen Jenkins	Comedy	Warner Bros.
Havana Widows	Ray Enright	Joan Blondell, Glenda Farrell, Guy Kibbee	Comedy	Warner Bros.
He Couldn't Take It	William Nigh	Ray Walker, Virginia Cherrill, Dorothy Granger	Comedy	Monogram
Headline Shooter	Otto Brower	William Gargan, Frances Dee, Ralph Bellamy	Drama	RKO
Hell and High Water	Grover Jones	Richard Arlen, Guy Standing, Gertrude Hoffmann	Drama	Paramount
Hell Below	Jack Conway	Robert Montgomery, Walter Huston, Jimmy Durante	Drama, War	MGM
Hello, Everybody!	William A. Seiter	Kate Smith, Randolph Scott, Sally Blane	Musical	Paramount
Hello, Sister!	Erich von Stroheim	James Dunn, ZaSu Pitts, Minna Gombell	Drama	Fox Film
Her Bodyguard	William Beaudine	Edmund Lowe, Wynne Gibson, Edward Arnold	Comedy	Paramount
Her First Mate	William Wyler	Slim Summerville, ZaSu Pitts, Una Merkel	Comedy	Universal
Her Forgotten Past	Wesley Ford	Monte Blue, Barbara Kent, Henry B. Walthall	Mystery	Independent
Her Resale Value	B. Reeves Eason	June Clyde, Noel Francis, Crauford Kent	Drama	Independent
Her Splendid Folly	William A. O'Connor	Lilian Bond, Theodore von Eltz, Beryl Mercer	Comedy	Independent
Heroes for Sale	William A. Wellman	Richard Barthelmess, Aline MacMahon, Loretta Young	Drama	Warner Bros.
High Gear	Leigh Jason	James Murray, Joan Marsh, Theodore von Eltz	Adventure, Drama	Majestic
His Double Life	Arthur Hopkins	Roland Young, Lillian Gish, Montagu Love	Comedy, Drama	Paramount
His Private Secretary	Phil Whitman	John Wayne, Evalyn Knapp, Reginald Barlow	Comedy	Independent
Hold Me Tight	David Butler	James Dunn, Sally Eilers, June Clyde	Drama	Fox Film
Hold the Press	Phil Rosen	Tim McCoy, Shirley Grey, Wheeler Oakman	Crime	Columbia
Hold Your Man	Sam Wood	Clark Gable, Jean Harlow, Stuart Erwin	Comedy, Drama	MGM
Hoop-La	Frank Lloyd	Clara Bow, Preston Foster, Richard Cromwell	Drama	Fox Film
Horse Play	Edward Sedgwick	Slim Summerville, Andy Devine, Leila Hyams	Comedy	Universal
Hot Pepper	John G. Blystone	Lupe Vélez, Edmund Lowe, Victor McLaglen	Comedy	Fox
Hotel Variety	Raymond Cannon	Hal Skelly, Olive Borden, Sally Rand	Musical crime	Independent
The House on 56th Street	Robert Florey	Kay Francis, Ricardo Cortez, Margaret Lindsay	Drama	Warner Bros.
Humanity	John Francis Dillon	Ralph Morgan, Irene Ware, Alexander Kirkland	Drama	Fox Film

== I-J ==
Title	Director	Featured Cast	Genre	Note
I Am Suzanne	Rowland V. Lee	Lilian Harvey, Gene Raymond, Leslie Banks	Romance	Fox Film
I Cover the Waterfront	James Cruze	Claudette Colbert, Ben Lyon, Ernest Torrence	Drama	United Artists
I Have Lived	Richard Thorpe	Alan Dinehart, Anita Page, Gertrude Astor	Drama	Chesterfield
I Love That Man	Harry Joe Brown	Edmund Lowe, Nancy Carroll, Robert Armstrong	Drama	Paramount
I Loved a Woman	Alfred E. Green	Edward G. Robinson, Kay Francis, Genevieve Tobin	Drama	Warner Bros.
I Loved You Wednesday	Henry King; William Cameron Menzies	Warner Baxter, Elissa Landi, Miriam Jordan	Comedy	Fox Film
I'm No Angel	Wesley Ruggles	Mae West, Cary Grant, Edward Arnold	Comedy, Musical	Paramount
If I Were Free	Elliott Nugent	Irene Dunne, Clive Brook, Nils Asther	Drama	RKO
The Important Witness	Sam Newfield	Noel Francis, Dorothy Burgess, Noel Madison	Crime	Independent
In the Money	Frank Strayer	Richard "Skeets" Gallagher, Lois Wilson	Comedy	Chesterfield
Infernal Machine	Marcel Varnel	Chester Morris, Genevieve Tobin, Victor Jory	Thriller	Fox Film
International House	A. Edward Sutherland	W. C. Fields, Stuart Erwin, George Burns	Comedy	Paramount
The Intruder	Albert Ray	Lila Lee, Monte Blue, William B. Davidson	Mystery, Drama	Allied Pictures
The Invisible Man	James Whale	Claude Rains, Gloria Stuart, Henry Travers	Science fiction, Horror	Universal
The Iron Master	Chester M. Franklin	Reginald Denny, Lila Lee, Esther Howard	Drama	Independent
It's Great to Be Alive	Alfred L. Werker	Edna May Oliver, Gloria Stuart, Raul Roulien	Comedy	Fox Film
Jennie Gerhardt	Marion Gering	Sylvia Sidney, Mary Astor, Edward Arnold	Drama	Paramount
Jimmy and Sally	James Tinling	James Dunn, Claire Trevor, Harvey Stephens	Comedy	Fox Film
Jungle Bride	Albert H. Kelley	Anita Page, Charles Starrett, Kenneth Thomson	Drama, Adventure	Monogram
Justice Takes a Holiday	Spencer Gordon Bennet	H.B. Warner, John Ince, Huntley Gordon	Drama	Independent

== K-L ==
Title	Director	Featured Cast	Genre	Note
The Kennel Murder Case	Michael Curtiz	William Powell, Mary Astor, Eugene Pallette	Mystery	Warner Bros.
The Keyhole	Michael Curtiz	Kay Francis, George Brent, Glenda Farrell	Comedy drama	Warner Bros.
King for a Night	Kurt Neumann	Chester Morris, Helen Twelvetrees, Alice White	Crime	Universal
King Kong	Merian C. Cooper, Ernest B. Schoedsack	Fay Wray, Robert Armstrong, Bruce Cabot	Adventure horror	RKO
King of the Arena	Alan James	Ken Maynard, Lucile Browne, Bob Kortman	Western	Universal
King of the Jungle	Max Marcin	Buster Crabbe, Frances Dee, Irving Pichel	Adventure, Drama	Paramount
King of the Wild Horses	Earl Haley	William Janney, Dorothy Appleby, Wallace MacDonald	Western	Columbia
The King's Vacation	John G. Adolfi	George Arliss, Patricia Ellis, Dick Powell	Romance	Warner Bros.
The Kiss Before the Mirror	James Whale	Nancy Carroll, Frank Morgan, Paul Lukas	Mystery	Universal
Kiss of Araby	Phil Rosen	Maria Alba, Walter Byron, Claire Windsor	Adventure	Independent
Ladies Must Love	E. A. Dupont	June Knight, Neil Hamilton, Sally O'Neil	Comedy	Universal
Ladies They Talk About	William Keighley	Barbara Stanwyck, Preston Foster, Lyle Talbot	Prison drama	Warner Bros.
Lady for a Day	Frank Capra	Warren William, May Robson, Guy Kibbee	Comedy	Columbia
Lady Killer	Roy Del Ruth	James Cagney, Margaret Lindsay, Mae Clarke	Comedy, Crime	Warner Bros.
A Lady's Profession	Norman Z. McLeod	Alison Skipworth, Roland Young, Sari Maritza	Comedy	Paramount
The Last Trail	James Tinling	George O'Brien, Claire Trevor, El Brendel	Western	Fox Film
Laughing at Life	Ford Beebe	Victor McLaglen, Conchita Montenegro, Lois Wilson	Adventure	Mascot
Laughter in Hell	Edward L. Cahn	Pat O'Brien, Gloria Stuart, Merna Kennedy	Drama	Universal
Let's Fall in Love	David Burton	Edmund Lowe, Ann Sothern, Miriam Jordan	Romance	Columbia
Life in the Raw	Louis King	George O'Brien, Claire Trevor, Greta Nissen	Western	Fox Film
The Life of Jimmy Dolan	Archie Mayo	Douglas Fairbanks Jr., Loretta Young, Aline MacMahon	Drama	Warner Bros.
Lilly Turner	William A. Wellman	Ruth Chatterton, Frank McHugh, Robert Barrat	Drama	Warner Bros.
The Little Giant	Roy Del Ruth	Edward G. Robinson, Mary Astor, Russell Hopton	Comedy, Crime	Warner Bros.
Little Women	George Cukor	Katharine Hepburn, Joan Bennett, Paul Lukas	Drama	RKO
The Lone Avenger	Alan James	Ken Maynard, Niles Welch, Alan Bridge	Western	Sono-Art
Lone Cowboy	Paul Sloane	Jackie Cooper, Lila Lee, Addison Richards	Western	Paramount
Looking Forward	Clarence Brown	Lionel Barrymore, Lewis Stone, Benita Hume	Drama	MGM
Love, Honor, and Oh Baby!	Edward Buzzell	Slim Summerville, ZaSu Pitts, Verree Teasdale	Comedy	Universal
Love Is Dangerous	Richard Thorpe	John Warburton, Rochelle Hudson, Bradley Page	Comedy	Chesterfield
Lucky Devils	Ralph Ince	William Boyd, Dorothy Wilson, Bruce Cabot	Drama	RKO
Lucky Dog	Zion Myers	Charles Sale, Tom O'Brien, Harry Holman	Drama	Universal
Luxury Liner	Lothar Mendes	George Brent, Zita Johann, Alice White	Drama	Paramount

== M-N ==
Title	Director	Featured Cast	Genre	Note
The Mad Game	Irving Cummings	Spencer Tracy, Claire Trevor, J. Carrol Naish	Drama	Fox Film
Made on Broadway	Harry Beaumont	Robert Montgomery, Madge Evans, Sally Eilers	Comedy, Drama	MGM
Mama Loves Papa	Norman Z. McLeod	Charlie Ruggles, Mary Boland, Lilyan Tashman	Comedy	Paramount
The Man from Monterey	Mack V. Wright	John Wayne, Ruth Hall, Lafe McKee	Western	Warner Bros.
Man Hunt	Irving Cummings	Junior Durkin, Charlotte Henry, Dorothy Davenport	Mystery	RKO
Man of Action	George Melford	Tim McCoy, Caryl Lincoln, Wheeler Oakman	Western	Universal
A Man of Sentiment	Richard Thorpe	Marian Marsh, Owen Moore, Geneva Mitchell	Drama	Chesterfield
Man of the Forest	Henry Hathaway	Randolph Scott, Verna Hillie, Noah Beery	Western	Paramount
The Man Who Dared	Hamilton MacFadden	Preston Foster, Zita Johann, Joan Marsh	Drama	Fox Film
Man's Castle	Frank Borzage	Spencer Tracy, Loretta Young, Glenda Farrell	Drama, Romance	Columbia
Marriage on Approval	Howard Higgin	Barbara Kent, William Farnum, Phyllis Barry	Drama	Independent
Mary Stevens, M.D.	Lloyd Bacon	Kay Francis, Lyle Talbot, Glenda Farrell	Drama	Warner Bros.
The Masquerader	Richard Wallace	Ronald Colman, Elissa Landi, Juliette Compton	Drama	United Artists
Master of Men	Lambert Hillyer	Jack Holt, Fay Wray, Walter Connolly	Drama	Columbia
The Mayor of Hell	Archie Mayo	James Cagney, Allen Jenkins, Dudley Digges	Drama, Crime	Warner Bros.
Meet the Baron	Walter Lang	Jack Pearl, Jimmy Durante, Edna May Oliver	Comedy	MGM
Melody Cruise	Mark Sandrich	June Brewster, Shirley Chambers, Marjorie Gateson	Romantic comedy	RKO
Men Must Fight	Edgar Selwyn	Diana Wynyard, Lewis Stone, Phillips Holmes	Drama, War	MGM
Midnight Club	Alexander Hall	George Raft, Clive Brook, Alison Skipworth	Drama, Crime	Paramount
Midnight Mary	William A. Wellman	Loretta Young, Ricardo Cortez, Franchot Tone	Drama	MGM
Midshipman Jack	Christy Cabanne	Bruce Cabot, Betty Furness, Frank Albertson	Action	RKO
The Mind Reader	Roy Del Ruth	Warren William, Constance Cummings, Allen Jenkins	Drama	Warner Bros.
The Monkey's Paw	Ernest B. Schoedsack	Ivan F. Simpson, C. Aubrey Smith, Betty Lawford	Horror	RKO
Moonlight and Pretzels	Karl Freund	William Frawley, Mary Brian, Herbert Rawlinson	Drama	Universal
Morning Glory	Lowell Sherman	Katharine Hepburn, Douglas Fairbanks Jr., Adolphe Menjou	Drama	RKO
Mr. Broadway	Johnnie Walker	Ed Sullivan, Jack Benny, Ruth Etting	Comedy	Independent
Mr. Skitch	James Cruze	Will Rogers, Rochelle Hudson, Florence Desmond	Comedy	Fox Film
Murder on the Campus	Richard Thorpe	Shirley Grey, Charles Starrett, Ruth Hall	Mystery	Chestefield
Murders in the Zoo	A. Edward Sutherland	Charlie Ruggles, Lionel Atwill, Kathleen Burke	Horror	Paramount
My Lips Betray	John G. Blystone	Lilian Harvey, John Boles, Irene Browne	Musical comedy	Fox Film
My Weakness	David Butler	Lilian Harvey, Lew Ayres, Charles Butterworth	Musical	Fox Film
My Woman	Victor Schertzinger	Helen Twelvetrees, Victor Jory, Claire Dodd	Romance	Columbia
Myrt and Marge	Al Boasberg	Myrtle Vail, Donna Damerel, Ted Healy	Comedy	Universal
The Mysterious Rider	Fred Allen	Kent Taylor, Lona Andre, Berton Churchill	Western	Paramount
The Mystic Hour	Melville De Lay	Charles Hutchison, Lucille Powers, Montagu Love	Mystery	Independent
Mystery of the Wax Museum	Michael Curtiz	Lionel Atwill, Fay Wray, Glenda Farrell	Horror	Warner Bros.
Nagana	Ernst L. Frank	Tala Birell, Melvyn Douglas, Onslow Stevens	Drama	Universal
The Narrow Corner	Alfred E. Green	Douglas Fairbanks, Patricia Ellis, Ralph Bellamy	Drama	Warner Bros.
Neighbors' Wives	B. Reeves Eason	Dorothy Mackaill, Tom Moore, Vivien Oakland	Drama	Independent
Night Flight	Clarence Brown	Lionel Barrymore, John Barrymore, Clark Gable	Drama	MGM
Night of Terror	Benjamin Stoloff	Bela Lugosi, Sally Blane, Wallace Ford	Horror	Columbia
No Marriage Ties	J. Walter Ruben	Richard Dix, Elizabeth Allan, Doris Kenyon	Drama	RKO
No Other Woman	J. Walter Ruben	Irene Dunne, Charles Bickford, Gwili Andre	Romance	RKO
Notorious But Nice	Richard Thorpe	Marian Marsh, Betty Compson, Rochelle Hudson	Drama	Chesterfield
The Nuisance	Jack Conway	Lee Tracy, Madge Evans, Frank Morgan	Comedy	MGM

== O-P ==
Title	Director	Featured Cast	Genre	Note
Obey the Law	Benjamin Stoloff	Leo Carrillo, Lois Wilson, Dickie Moore	Crime	Columbia
Oliver Twist	William J. Cowen	Irving Pichel, Dickie Moore, Doris Lloyd	Drama	Monogram
Olsen's Big Moment	Malcolm St. Clair	El Brendel, Barbara Weeks, Susan Fleming	Comedy	Fox Film
On Your Guard	George Crone	Richard Talmadge, Dorothy Burgess, DeWitt Jennings	Crime	Independent
One Man's Journey	John S. Robertson	Lionel Barrymore, May Robson, Joel McCrea	Drama	RKO
One Sunday Afternoon	Stephen Roberts	Gary Cooper, Fay Wray, Neil Hamilton	Romantic comedy	Paramount
One Year Later	E. Mason Hopper	Mary Brian, Russell Hopton, DeWitt Jennings	Drama	Allied Pictures
Only Yesterday	John M. Stahl	Margaret Sullavan, John Boles, Billie Burke	Drama	Universal
Our Betters	George Cukor	Constance Bennett, Anita Louise, Gilbert Roland	Comedy	RKO
Out All Night	Sam Taylor	Slim Summerville, ZaSu Pitts, Shirley Grey	Comedy	Universal
Paddy the Next Best Thing	Harry Lachman	Janet Gaynor, Warner Baxter, Walter Connolly	Comedy	Fox Film
Parachute Jumper	Alfred E. Green	Bette Davis, Douglas Fairbanks Jr., Claire Dodd	Drama	Warner Bros.
Parole Girl	Edward F. Cline	Mae Clarke, Ralph Bellamy, Marie Prevost	Drama	Columbia
The Past of Mary Holmes	Harlan Thompson	Helen MacKellar, Eric Linden, Jean Arthur	Drama	RKO
Peg o' My Heart	Robert Z. Leonard	Marion Davies, Onslow Stevens, Juliette Compton	Romance	MGM
Penthouse	W. S. Van Dyke	Warner Baxter, Myrna Loy, Mae Clarke	Crime	MGM
The Phantom Broadcast	Phil Rosen	Ralph Forbes, Vivienne Osborne, Gail Patrick	Mystery	Monogram
Phantom Thunderbolt	Alan James	Ken Maynard, Frances Lee, William Gould	Western	Sono-Art
Pick-Up	Marion Gering	Sylvia Sidney, George Raft, Lilian Bond	Drama	Paramount
Picture Brides	Phil Rosen	Dorothy Mackaill, Regis Toomey, Alan Hale	Adventure	Allied Pictures
Picture Snatcher	Lloyd Bacon	James Cagney, Ralph Bellamy, Alice White	Drama	Warner Bros.
Pilgrimage	John Ford	Henrietta Crosman, Heather Angel, Norman Foster	Drama	Fox Film
Pleasure Cruise	Frank Tuttle	Genevieve Tobin, Roland Young, Ralph Forbes	Comedy	Fox Film
Police Call	Phil Whitman	Nick Stuart, Merna Kennedy, Roberta Gale	Crime	Independent
Police Car 17	Lambert Hillyer	Tim McCoy, Evalyn Knapp, Edwin Maxwell	Crime	Columbia
The Power and the Glory	William K. Howard	Spencer Tracy, Colleen Moore, Helen Vinson	Drama	Fox Film
Private Detective 62	Michael Curtiz	William Powell, Margaret Lindsay, Ruth Donnelly	Mystery	Warner Bros.
Private Jones	Russell Mack	Lee Tracy, Gloria Stuart, Donald Cook	Comedy	Universal
The Prizefighter and the Lady	W. S. Van Dyke	Myrna Loy, Walter Huston, Max Baer	Comedy	MGM
Professional Sweetheart	William A. Seiter	Ginger Rogers, Norman Foster, ZaSu Pitts	Romantic comedy	RKO
Queen Christina	Rouben Mamoulian	Greta Garbo, John Gilbert, Lewis Stone	Drama	MGM

== R-S ==
Title	Director	Featured Cast	Genre	Note
Racetrack	James Cruze	Leo Carrillo, Lee Moran, Kay Hammond	Sports drama	Independent
Rafter Romance	William A. Seiter	Ginger Rogers, Norman Foster, George Sidney	Romantic comedy	RKO
Ranger's Code	Robert N. Bradbury	Bob Steele, Doris Hill, George "Gabby" Hayes	Western	Monogram
Rainbow Over Broadway	Richard Thorpe	Joan Marsh, Frank Albertson, Lucien Littlefield	Musical	Chesterfield
Rainbow Ranch	Harry L. Fraser	Rex Bell, Cecilia Parker, Bob Kortman	Western	Monogram
Reform Girl	Sam Newfield	Noel Francis, Richard Gallagher, Dorothy Peterson	Drama	Independent
The Return of Casey Jones	John P. McCarthy	Charles Starrett, Ruth Hall, George Walsh	Action	Monogram
Reunion in Vienna	Sidney Franklin	John Barrymore, Diana Wynyard, Frank Morgan	Romance	MGM
Revenge at Monte Carlo	B. Reeves Eason	June Collyer, José Crespo, Dorothy Gulliver	Crime Drama	Independent
Riders of Destiny	Robert N. Bradbury	John Wayne, Cecilia Parker, Forrest Taylor	Western	Monogram
The Right to Romance	Alfred Santell	Ann Harding, Robert Young, Nils Asther	Drama	RKO
Riot Squad	Harry S. Webb	Madge Bellamy, Pat O'Malley, Addison Richards	Crime	Independent
Robbers' Roost	David Howard, Louis King	George O'Brien, Maureen O'Sullivan, Walter McGrail	Western	Fox
Roman Scandals	Frank Tuttle	Eddie Cantor, Ruth Etting, Gloria Stuart	Musical	United Artists
Rustlers' Roundup	Henry MacRae	Tom Mix, Diane Sinclair, Douglass Dumbrille	Western	Universal
Rusty Rides Alone	D. Ross Lederman	Tim McCoy, Barbara Weeks, Dorothy Burgess	Western	Columbia
Sagebrush Trail	Armand Schaefer	John Wayne, Lane Chandler, Yakima Canutt	Western	Monogram
Sailor Be Good	James Cruze	Jack Oakie, Vivienne Osborne, Gertrude Michael	Comedy	RKO
Sailor's Luck	Raoul Walsh	James Dunn, Sally Eilers, Victor Jory	Comedy	Fox Film
Saturday's Millions	Edward Sedgwick	Robert Young, Andy Devine, Leila Hyams	Drama	Universal
Scarlet River	Otto Brower	Tom Keene, Dorothy Wilson, Roscoe Ates	Western	RKO
Second Hand Wife	Hamilton MacFadden	Sally Eilers, Helen Vinson, Ralph Bellamy	Drama	Fox Film
The Secret of Madame Blanche	Charles Brabin	Irene Dunne, Lionel Atwill, Phillips Holmes	Drama	MGM
Secret of the Blue Room	Kurt Neumann	Lionel Atwill, Gloria Stuart, Paul Lukas	Horror	Universal
Secret Sinners	Wesley Ford	Jack Mulhall, Sue Carol, Cecilia Parker	Drama	Independent
Secrets	Frank Borzage	Mary Pickford, Leslie Howard, C. Aubrey Smith	Western drama	United Artists
Sensation Hunters	Charles Vidor	Arline Judge, Preston Foster, Marion Burns	Drama	Monogram
The Shadow Laughs	Arthur Hoerl	Hal Skelly, Rose Hobart, Harry T. Morey	Mystery	Independent
Shadows of Sing Sing	Phil Rosen	Mary Brian, Bruce Cabot, Grant Mitchell	Drama	Columbia
Shanghai Madness	John G. Blystone	Spencer Tracy, Fay Wray, Ralph Morgan	Drama	Fox Film
She Done Him Wrong	Lowell Sherman	Mae West, Cary Grant, Gilbert Roland	Romantic comedy	Paramount
She Had to Say Yes	Busby Berkeley	Loretta Young, Lyle Talbot, Winnie Lightner	Drama	Warner Bros.
Ship of Wanted Men	Lewis D. Collins	Dorothy Sebastian, Fred Kohler, Leon Ames	Drama	Independent
Should Ladies Behave	Harry Beaumont	Lionel Barrymore, Alice Brady, Conway Tearle	Comedy	MGM
A Shriek in the Night	Albert Ray	Ginger Rogers, Lyle Talbot, Arthur Hoyt	Mystery	Allied Pictures
Silent Men	D. Ross Lederman	Tim McCoy, J. Carrol Naish, Wheeler Oakman	Western	Columbia
The Silk Express	Ray Enright	Neil Hamilton, Sheila Terry, Arthur Byron	Drama	Warner Bros.
The Silver Cord	John Cromwell	Irene Dunne, Joel McCrea, Laura Hope Crews	Drama	RKO
The Sin of Nora Moran	Phil Goldstone	Zita Johann, John Miljan, Paul Cavanagh	Crime drama	Majestic
Sing Sinner Sing	Howard Christie	Paul Lukas, Leila Hyams, Ruth Donnelly	Drama	Majestic
Sitting Pretty	Harry Joe Brown	Jack Oakie, Ginger Rogers, Thelma Todd	Comedy	Paramount
Skyway	Lewis D. Collins	Ray Walker, Kathryn Crawford, Lucien Littlefield	Comedy	Monogram
Smoke Lightning	David Howard	George O'Brien, Nell O'Day, Frank Atkinson	Western	Fox Film
Smoky	Eugene Forde	Victor Jory, Irene Bentley, Frank Campeau	Western	Fox Film; 1946 film
So This Is Africa	Edward F. Cline	Bert Wheeler, Robert Woolsey, Raquel Torres	Comedy	Columbia
Soldiers of the Storm	D. Ross Lederman	Regis Toomey, Anita Page, Robert Ellis	Crime	Columbia
The Solitaire Man	Jack Conway	Herbert Marshall, Mary Boland, Elizabeth Allan	Drama	MGM
Somewhere in Sonora	Mack V. Wright	John Wayne, Henry B. Walthall, Shirley Palmer	Western	Warner Bros.
Son of a Sailor	Lloyd Bacon	Joe E. Brown, Jean Muir, Frank McHugh	Comedy	Warner Bros.
Son of the Border	Lloyd Nosler	Tom Keene, Julie Haydon, Edgar Kennedy	Western	RKO
Son of Kong	Ernest B. Schoedsack	Robert Armstrong, Helen Mack, Frank Reicher	Adventure	RKO
The Song of Songs	Rouben Mamoulian	Marlene Dietrich, Brian Aherne, Lionel Atwill	Romance	Paramount
Sons of the Desert	William A. Seiter	Stan Laurel, Oliver Hardy, Mae Busch	Comedy	MGM
Song of the Eagle	Ralph Murphy	Charles Bickford, Richard Arlen, Mary Brian	Drama	Paramount
The Sphinx	Phil Rosen	Lionel Atwill, Sheila Terry, Theodore Newton	Mystery	Monogram
Stage Mother	Charles Brabin	Alice Brady, Maureen O'Sullivan, Franchot Tone	Drama	MGM
State Fair	Henry King	Janet Gaynor, Will Rogers, Lew Ayres	Comedy drama	Fox Film
State Trooper	D. Ross Lederman	Regis Toomey, Evalyn Knapp, Barbara Weeks	Crime	Columbia
Storm at Daybreak	Richard Boleslawski	Kay Francis, Nils Asther, Walter Huston	Drama	MGM
The Story of Temple Drake	Stephen Roberts	Miriam Hopkins, Jack La Rue, William Gargan	Drama	Paramount
Straightaway	Otto Brower	Tim McCoy, Sue Carol, William Bakewell	Crime	Columbia
Strange People	Richard Thorpe	John Darrow, Gloria Shea, Hale Hamilton	Mystery	Chesterfield
The Stranger's Return	King Vidor	Miriam Hopkins, Lionel Barrymore, Franchot Tone	Drama	MGM
Strawberry Roan	Alan James	Ken Maynard, Ruth Hall, Harold Goodwin	Western	Universal
Strictly Personal	Ralph Murphy	Marjorie Rambeau, Dorothy Jordan, Louis Calhern	Comedy	Paramount
A Study in Scarlet	Edwin L. Marin	Reginald Owen, Anna May Wong, June Clyde	Horror	Sono-Art
Sunset Pass	Henry Hathaway	Randolph Scott, Tom Keene, Kathleen Burke	Western	Paramount
Supernatural	Victor Halperin	Carole Lombard, Alan Dinehart, Randolph Scott	Horror	Paramount
Sweepings	John Cromwell	Lionel Barrymore, Gloria Stuart, Eric Linden	Drama	RKO
The Sweetheart of Sigma Chi	Edwin L. Marin	Mary Carlisle, Buster Crabbe, Florence Lake	Comedy drama	Monogram

== T-U ==
Title	Director	Featured Cast	Genre	Note
Take a Chance	Monte Brice	James Dunn, June Knight, Lillian Roth	Comedy	Paramount
The Telegraph Trail	Tenny Wright	John Wayne, Frank McHugh, Marceline Day	Western	Warner Bros.
Terror Aboard	Paul Sloane	John Halliday, Shirley Grey, Charlie Ruggles	Mystery	Paramount
Terror Trail	Armand Schaefer	Tom Mix, Raymond Hatton, Naomi Judge	Western	Universal
This Day and Age	Cecil B. DeMille	Charles Bickford, Richard Cromwell, Judith Allen	Drama	Paramount
Three-Cornered Moon	Elliot Nugent	Claudette Colbert, Richard Arlen, Mary Boland	Comedy	Paramount Pictures
The Thrill Hunter	George B. Seitz	Buck Jones, Dorothy Revier, Eddie Kane	Comedy	Columbia
The Thundering Herd	Henry Hathaway	Randolph Scott, Judith Allen, Buster Crabbe	Western	Paramount
Tillie and Gus	Francis Martin	W. C. Fields, Alison Skipworth, Julie Bishop	Comedy	Paramount
To the Last Man	Henry Hathaway	Randolph Scott, Esther Ralston, Jack La Rue	Western	Paramount
Today We Live	Howard Hawks	Joan Crawford, Gary Cooper, Roland Young	Drama	MGM
Tomorrow at Seven	Ray Enright	Chester Morris, Vivienne Osborne, Frank McHugh	Crime comedy	RKO
Tonight Is Ours	Stuart Walker	Claudette Colbert, Fredric March, Paul Cavanagh	Romance	Paramount
Too Much Harmony	A. Edward Sutherland	Bing Crosby, Jack Oakie, Judith Allen	Musical comedy	Paramount
Topaze	Harry d'Abbadie d'Arrast	John Barrymore, Myrna Loy, Jobyna Howland	Drama	RKO
Torch Singer	Alexander Hall	Claudette Colbert, Ricardo Cortez, David Manners	Musical romance	Paramount
The Trail Drive	Alan James	Ken Maynard, Cecilia Parker, William Gould	Western	Universal
Trailing North	John P. McCarthy	Bob Steele, Doris Hill, Arthur Rankin	Western	Monogram
Treason	George B. Seitz	Buck Jones, Shirley Grey, Robert Ellis	Western	Columbia
Trick for Trick	Hamilton MacFadden	Ralph Morgan, Sally Blane, Victor Jory	Mystery	Fox Film
Trouble Busters	Lewis D. Collins	Jack Hoxie, Lane Chandler, Harry Todd	Western	Majestic
Tugboat Annie	Mervyn LeRoy	Marie Dressler, Wallace Beery, Maureen O'Sullivan	Romantic comedy	MGM
Turn Back the Clock	Edgar Selwyn	Lee Tracy, Mae Clarke, Otto Kruger	Drama	MGM
Twin Husbands	Frank R. Strayer	John Miljan, Shirley Grey, Hale Hamilton	Drama	Chesterfield
Under Secret Orders	Sam Newfield	Don Dillaway, Nina Quartero, Phyllis Barrington	Thriller	Independent
Under the Tonto Rim	Henry Hathaway	Stuart Erwin, Fred Kohler, Raymond Hatton	Western	Paramount
Unknown Valley	Lambert Hillyer	Buck Jones, Cecilia Parker, Ward Bond	Western	Columbia

== V-Z ==
Title	Director	Featured Cast	Genre	Note
The Vampire Bat	Frank R. Strayer	Fay Wray, Lionel Atwill, Melvyn Douglas	Horror	Majestic
Via Pony Express	Lewis D. Collins	Jack Hoxie, Lane Chandler, Marceline Day	Western	Majestic
Voltaire	John G. Adolfi	George Arliss, Doris Kenyon, Margaret Lindsay	Biography	Warner Bros.
Walls of Gold	Kenneth MacKenna	Sally Eilers, Norman Foster, Ralph Morgan	Drama	Fox Film
War of the Range	J.P. McGowan	Tom Tyler, Caryl Lincoln, Charles K. French	Western	Independent
The Warrior's Husband	Walter Lang	Elissa Landi, David Manners, Marjorie Rambeau	Comedy	Fox Film
The Way to Love	Norman Taurog	Maurice Chevalier, Ann Dvorak, Edward Everett Horton	Romantic comedy	Paramount
West of Singapore	Albert Ray	Betty Compson, Weldon Heyburn, Margaret Lindsay	Drama	Monogram
What! No Beer?	Edward Sedgwick	Buster Keaton, Jimmy Durante, Phyllis Barry	Comedy	MGM
What Price Decency	Arthur Gregor	Dorothy Burgess, Alan Hale, Walter Byron	Drama	Majestic
What Price Innocence?	Willard Mack	Jean Parker, Minna Gombell, Betty Grable	Drama	Columbia
When Ladies Meet	Harry Beaumont	Ann Harding, Myrna Loy, Robert Montgomery	Drama	MGM
When Strangers Marry	Clarence G. Badger	Jack Holt, Lilian Bond, Barbara Barondess	Drama	Columbia
The Whirlwind	D. Ross Lederman	Tim McCoy, Alice Dahl, Pat O'Malley	Western	Columbia
Whistling in the Dark	Elliott Nugent	Una Merkel, Edward Arnold, Ernest Truex	Mystery	MGM
The White Sister	Victor Fleming	Helen Hayes, Clark Gable, Lewis Stone	Drama	MGM
White Woman	Stuart Walker	Carole Lombard, Charles Laughton, Charles Bickford	Drama	Paramount
Wild Boys of the Road	William Wellman	Frankie Darro, Rochelle Hudson, Dorothy Coonan	Drama	Warner Bros.
Wine, Women and Song	Herbert Brenon	Lilyan Tashman, Lew Cody, Marjorie Reynolds	Drama	Monogram
The Woman Accused	Paul Sloane	Cary Grant, Nancy Carroll, Louis Calhern	Drama	Paramount
The Woman I Stole	Irving Cummings	Jack Holt, Fay Wray, Raquel Torres	Adventure	Columbia
The Woman Who Dared	Millard Webb	Claudia Dell, Monroe Owsley, Lola Lane	Drama	Independent
The Women in His Life	George B. Seitz	Otto Kruger, Una Merkel, Ben Lyon	Crime	MGM
The Working Man	John G. Adolfi	George Arliss, Bette Davis, Theodore Newton	Comedy	Warner Bros.
The World Changes	Mervyn LeRoy	Paul Muni, Aline MacMahon, Mary Astor	Drama	Warner Bros.
The World Gone Mad	Christy Cabanne	Pat O'Brien, Evelyn Brent, Neil Hamilton	Crime	Majestic
The Worst Woman in Paris?	Monta Bell	Benita Hume, Adolphe Menjou, Helen Chandler	Drama	Fox Film
The Wrecker	Albert S. Rogell	Jack Holt, Genevieve Tobin, George E. Stone	Action	Columbia
Zoo in Budapest	Rowland V. Lee	Loretta Young, Gene Raymond, Wally Albright	Drama	Fox Film

== Documentaries ==
Title	Director	Featured Cast	Genre	Note
India Speaks	Walter Futter	Narrated by Richard Halliburton	Documentary	RKO
This Is America	Gilbert Seldes and Frederic Ullman Jr.	Alois Havrilla (narrator)	Documentary	

== Serials ==
Title	Director	Featured Cast	Genre	Note
The Perils of Pauline	Ray Taylor	Evalyn Knapp, Sonny Ray	Cliffhanger	Universal Pictures

== Shorts ==
Title	Director	Featured Cast	Genre	Note
Dora's Dunking Doughnuts	Harry Edwards	Andy Clyde, Shirley Temple	Comedy	
Lot in Sodom	James Sibley Watson	Friedrich Haak		
The Midnight Patrol	Lloyd French	Stan Laurel, Oliver Hardy, Harry Bernard	Comedy	MGM
Narcotic	Dwain Esper	Harry Cording, Joan Dix	Drama	
Three Little Pigs	Burt Gillett	Pinto Colvig, Billy Bletcher	Animated	Walt Disney

== See also ==
- 1933 in the United States
