= Samuel Bischoff =

American film producer (1890–1975)

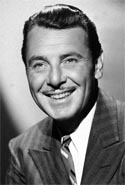
- Bischoff in the 1940s
- Born: August 11, 1890; Hartford, Connecticut, US
- Died: May 21, 1975 (aged 84); Hollywood, California, US
- Education: Boston University
- Occupation: Film producer
- Years active: 1922–1964

Samuel Bischoff (August 11, 1890 – May 21, 1975) was an American film producer who was responsible for more than 400 full-length films, two-reel comedies, and serials between 1922 and 1964.

== Life ==
Born to a Jewish family in Hartford, Connecticut, Bischoff graduated from Boston University, then headed for Hollywood, where he began his career in 1922 by producing comedy shorts including Stan Laurel's Mixed Nuts (1922).

He was the head of Samuel Bischoff Productions, a low-budget production company in the 1930s. He drew the attention of Columbia Pictures head Harry Cohn, who hired him to supervise the studio's feature film productions. In 1932, he moved to Warner Bros. and when Hal B. Wallis became production chief after Darryl F. Zanuck left in 1933, Bischoff and Henry Blanke were the main producers at the studio. He returned to Columbia in 1941.

He was also the President of Moroccan Pictures Inc. in 1948, producing the George Raft film Outpost in Morocco (1948). In 1950 he became production chief at RKO replacing Sid Rogell but did not stay long.

He rejoined Warners and by 1953, was one of only three producers left, along with Blanke and David Weisbart.

His last film was The Strangler (1964).

Bischoff died in 1975, in Hollywood, California, from general debilitation at the age of 84.

== Filmography ==
- Mixed Nuts (1922) (Short)
- Try and Get It (1924)
- Racing Luck (1924)
- The Live Agent (1925) (Short)
- Assorted Nuts (1925) (Short)
- Play Ball (II) (1925) (Short)
- Spooky Spooks (1925) (Short)
- Account of Monte Cristo (1925) (Short)
- Hollywouldn't (1925) (Short)
- Roomers Afloat (1925) (Short)
- Taming of the Shrewd (1925) (Short)
- Starvation Hunters (1925) (Short)
- Service (1925) (Short)
- Cured Hams (1925) (Short)
- Rain and Shine (1926) (Short)
- Last of the Mohegians (1926) (Short)
- Alibi's Forty Thieves (1926) (Short)
- Defective Detectives (1926) (Short)
- The Silent Flyer (1926)
- The Gypsy Romance (1926)
- Fangs of Justice (1926)
- Catch-As-Catch-Can (1927)
- When Danger Calls (1927)
- The Snarl of Hate (1927)
- Where Trails Begin (1927)
- The Girl from Rio (1927)
- Code of the Air (1928)
- Homicide Squad (1931)
- Graft (1931)
- Lasca of the Rio Grande (1931)
- X Marks the Spot (1931)
- Hotel Continental (1932)
- Lena Rivers (1932)
- Strangers of the Evening (1932)
- The Rich Are Always with Us (1932)
- The Dark Horse (1932)
- Dynamite Ranch (1932)
- The Last Mile (1932)
- Come On, Tarzan (1932)
- Between Fighting Men (1932)
- Three on a Match (1932)
- Tombstone Canyon (1932)
- Drum Taps (1933)
- Phantom Thunderbolt (1933)
- Fargo Express (1933)
- The Lone Avenger (1933)
- A Study in Scarlet (1933)
- Enemies of Society (1933)
- Deluge (1933)
- From Headquarters (1933)
- Fargo Express (1933)
- The Big Shakedown (1934)
- Bedside (1934)
- Heat Lightning (1934)
- Registered Nurse (1934)
- Return of the Terror (1934)
- Side Streets (1934)
- Friends of Mr. Sweeney (1934)
- I Sell Anything (1934)
- The St. Louis Kid (1934)
- Babbitt (1934)
- Murder in the Clouds (1934)
- Sweet Music (1935)
- A Night at the Ritz (1935)
- Traveling Saleslady (1935)
- Go Into Your Dance (1935)
- Going Highbrow (1935)
- Don't Bet on Blondes (1935)
- Broadway Gondolier (1935)
- The Irish in Us (1935)
- Little Big Shot (1935)
- Special Agent (1935)
- Stars Over Broadway (1935)
- Frisco Kid (1935)
- Front Page Woman (1935)
- Boulder Dam (1936)
- The Golden Arrow (1936)
- Public Enemy's Wife (1936)
- Earthworm Tractors (1936)
- China Clipper (1936)
- The Charge of the Light Brigade (1936)
- Sing Me a Love Song (1936)
- Ready, Willing and Able (1937)
- The Go Getter (1937)
- Kid Galahad (1937)
- Slim (1937)
- San Quentin (1937)
- Back in Circulation (1937)
- Hollywood Hotel (1937)
- Swing Your Lady (1938)
- Gold Is Where You Find It (1938)
- A Slight Case of Murder (1938)
- Gold Diggers in Paris (1938)
- Racket Busters (1938)
- Boy Meets Girl (1938)
- Hard to Get (1938)
- Angels with Dirty Faces (1938)
- The Oklahoma Kid (1939)
- You Can't Get Away with Murder (1939)
- The Kid from Kokomo (1939)
- Naughty But Nice (1939)
- The Roaring Twenties (1939)
- A Child Is Born (1939)
- Castle on the Hudson (1940)
- Three Cheers for the Irish (1940)
- Escape to Glory (1940)
- They Dare Not Love (1941)
- You'll Never Get Rich (1941)
- Texas (1941)
- Three Girls About Town (1941)
- Two Yanks in Trinidad (1942)
- A Night to Remember (1942)
- Appointment in Berlin (1943)
- Dangerous Blondes (1943)
- There's Something About a Soldier (1943)
- None Shall Escape (1944)
- Carolina Blues (1944)
- A Thousand and One Nights (1945)
- Mr. District Attorney (1947)
- The Corpse Came C.O.D. (1947)
- Intrigue (1947)
- Pitfall (1948)
- Outpost in Morocco (1949)
- Mrs. Mike (1949)
- Sealed Cargo (1951)
- Best of the Badmen (1951)
- Macao (1952)
- The Las Vegas Story (1952)
- The Half-Breed (1952)
- The System (1953)
- South Sea Woman (1953)
- The Bounty Hunter (1954)
- For the Defense (1954)
- A Bullet for Joey (1955)
- The Phenix City Story (1955)
- Celebrity Playhouse (TV Series - 1 Episode)
  - For the Defense (1955)
- Screaming Eagles (1956)
- Casey Jones (TV Series - 2 Episodes)
  - Girl in the Cab (1957)
  - Dangerous Hours (1958)
- Operation Eichmann (1961)
- King of the Roaring 20's: The Story of Arnold Rothstein (1961)
- The Strangler (1964)
