= Forrest Sheldon =

American film director and screenwriter

- Born: Forrest K. Sheldon; Trinidad, Colorado, U.S.
- Occupations: Actor, film director, screenwriter

Forrest K. Sheldon was an American actor, film director and screenwriter. He directed and wrote for over forty films from 1924 to 1940. Many of his films were westerns.

Sheldon was born in Trinidad, Colorado. He was educated in Los Angeles, California and began working at Kalem Company in 1914. He worked for various studios and worked on Ken Maynard films including Hell-Fire Austin. He also worked on Tom Keene and Buck Jones films.

== Filmography ==
- False Trails (1924), actor
- Makers of Men (1925), director
- Never Too Late (1925), director
- No Man's Law (1925), director
- The Knockout Kid (1925), writer
- The Snob Buster (1925), writer
- The Man from Oklahoma (1926), director
- The Grey Vulture (1926), director
- The Haunted Ship (1927), director
- Code of the Scarlet (1928), co-writer
- Law of the Rio Grande (1931), director
- Dynamite Ranch (1932), director
- Hell Fire Austin (1932), director
- Between Fighting Men (1932), director
- The Lone Trail (1932), director
- Hell-Fire Austin (1932)
- The Texas Ranger (1931), writer
- The Lone Rider (1930), co-wrote
- The Dawn Trail (1930), story
- Phantom Thunderbolt (1933), co-writer
- The Lone Avenger (1933), writer
- Wilderness Mail (1935), director
- Men of Action (1935), co-wrote screenplay
- Port of Hate (1939), story
- Texas Stampede (1939), co-writer
