= Sono Art-World Wide Pictures =

American film distributor and production company

- Company type: Film production
- Industry: Entertainment
- Founded: 1927; 99 years ago
- Founder: W. Ray Johnston
- Defunct: 1933; 93 years ago
- Fate: Merged with Allied Pictures
- Successor: Monogram Pictures

Sono Art-World Wide Pictures was an American film distribution and production company in operation from 1927 to 1933. Their first feature film was The Rainbow Man (1929), while one of their most prominent was The Great Gabbo (1929) starring Erich von Stroheim and directed by James Cruze for James Cruze Productions, Inc. One of the last films distributed by the company was A Study in Scarlet (1933) starring Reginald Owen as Sherlock Holmes.

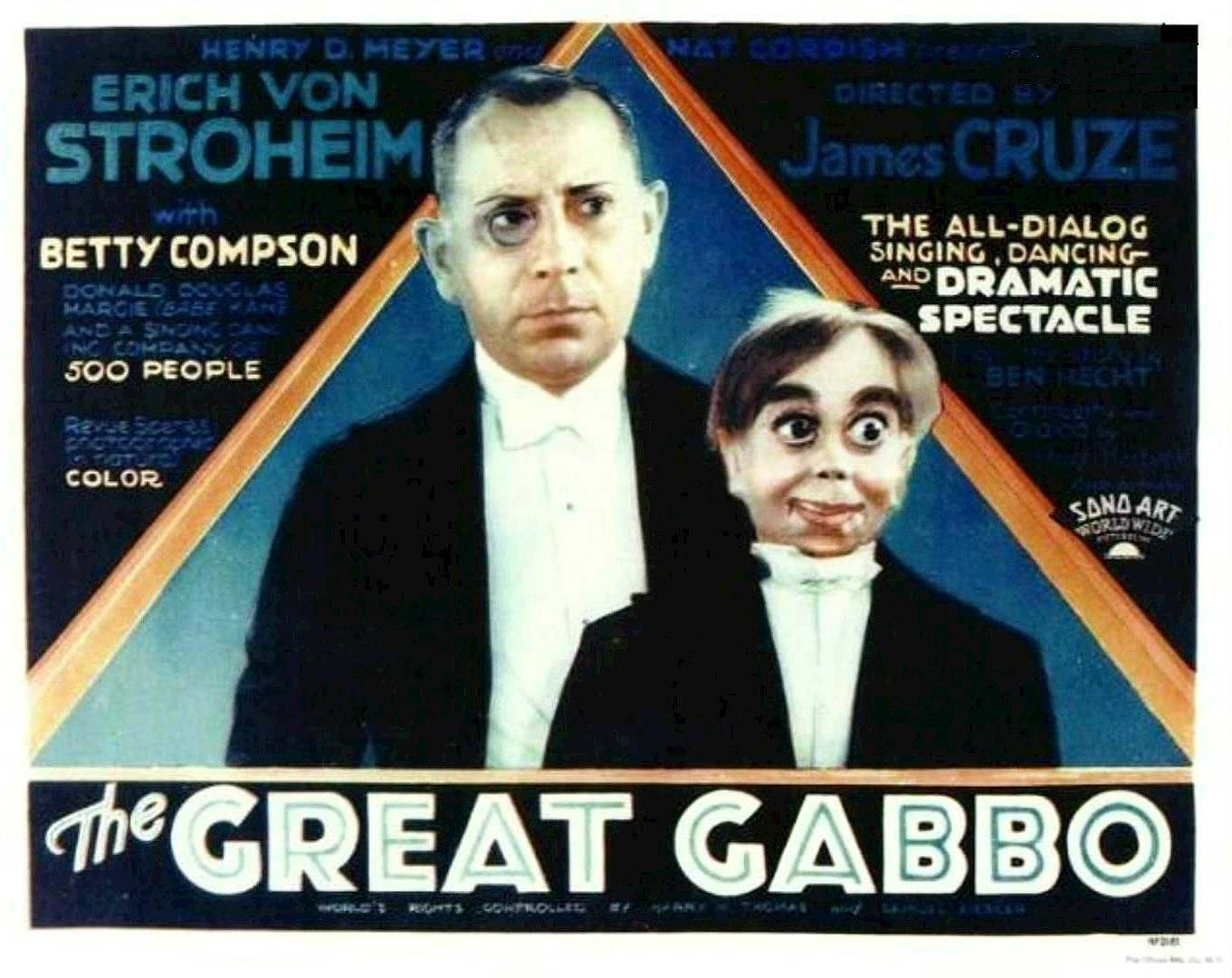
The Great Gabbo

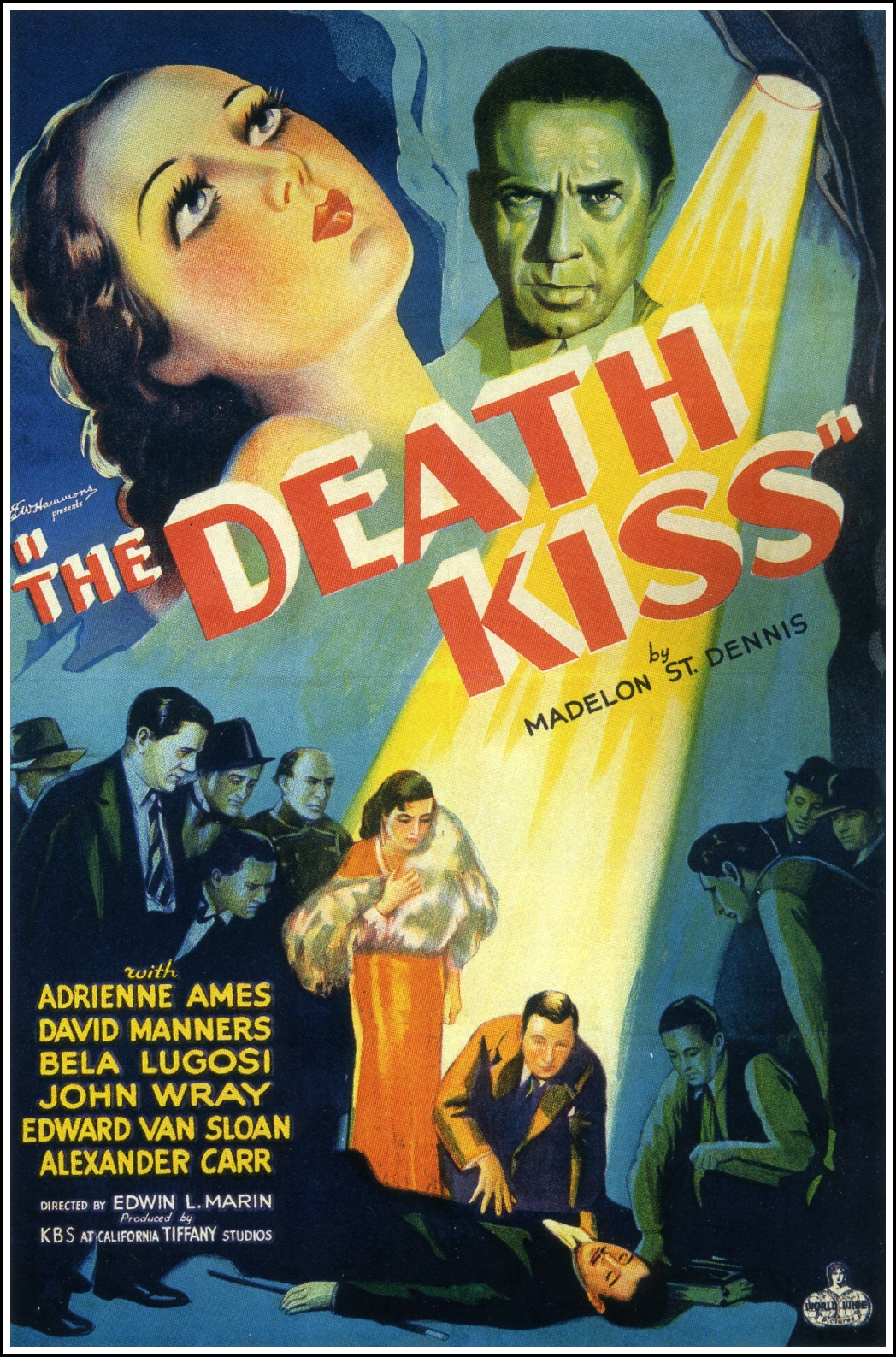
The Death Kiss (1932) produced by Tiffany Pictures and released by Sono Art-World Wide Pictures with Sono Art logo in lower right corner of poster

Sono Art was the original U.S. distributor for four Alfred Hitchcock-directed films, Downhill (1927), Easy Virtue (1928), The Manxman (1929), and Blackmail (1929), as well as the British Anna May Wong vehicle Piccadilly (1929).

== Merger ==
In 1932, Sono Art-World Wide acquired Tiffany Pictures.

In 1933, Sono-Art merged with Rayart Pictures to form Monogram Pictures. The original Monogram merged into Republic Pictures in 1935; all Sono Art-World Wide and original Monogram productions have fallen into the public domain.

== Filmography ==
- The Talk of Hollywood (1929)
- The Great Gabbo (1929)
- Blaze o' Glory (1929)
- The Rainbow Man (1929)
- Midnight Daddies (1929)
- Hello Sister (1930)
- What a Man (1930)
- Cock o' the Walk (1930)
- The Big Fight (1930)
- The Dude Wrangler (1930)
- Rogue of the Rio Grande (1930)
- Once a Gentleman (1930)
- Reno (1930)
- The Costello Case (1930)
- Damaged Love (1931)
- Swanee River (1931)
- Mounted Fury (1931)
- Murder at Midnight (1931)
- Air Police (1931)
- In Old Cheyenne (1931)
- First Aid (1931)
- Hell-Bent for Frisco (1931)
- Is There Justice? (1931)
- Neck and Neck (1931)
- Law of the West (1932)
- The Last Mile (1932)
- Texas Buddies (1932)
- Riders of the Desert (1932)
- Between Fighting Men (1932)
- Come On, Tarzan (1932)
- Those We Love (1932)
- The Crooked Circle (1932)
- Son of Oklahoma (1932)
- The Man from Hell's Edges (1932)
- Sunset Trail (1932)
- False Faces (1932)
- Breach of Promise (1932)
- Trailing the Killer (1932)
- South of Santa Fe (1932)
- Dynamite Ranch (1932)
- Tombstone Canyon (1932)
- The Man Called Back (1932)
- Those We Love (1932)
- The Death Kiss (1932)
- Uptown New York (1932)
- Cannonball Express (1932)
- Devil on Deck (1932)
- Hypnotized (1932)
- Racetrack (1933)
- Fargo Express (1933)
- Phantom Thunderbolt (1933)
- The Lone Avenger (1933)
- The Constant Woman (1933)
- Drum Taps (1933)
- A Study in Scarlet (1933)
