= Flora E. Douglas =

American film producer

- Born: September 25, 1895; Nebraska, United States
- Died: November 10, 1962 (aged 67); Fresno, California, United States
- Occupation: Producer
- Years active: 1929–1932 (film)

Flora E. Douglas (1895–1962) was an American film producer active in the American film industry in the early 1930s. She generally produced westerns or action films. She is also credited as F.E. Douglas.

== Selected filmography ==
- Untamed Justice (1929)
- Beyond the Rio Grande (1930)
- Firebrand Jordan (1930)
- The Phantom of the Desert (1930)
- Canyon Hawks (1930)
- Westward Bound (1930)
- Bar-L Ranch (1930)
- Law of the Rio Grande (1931)
- Hell's Valley (1931)
- Red Fork Range (1931)
- The Mystery Trooper (1931)
- Swanee River (1931)
- Air Police (1931)
- In Old Cheyenne (1931)
- The Lone Trail (1932)

== Bibliography ==
- Pitts, Michael R. Poverty Row Studios, 1929–1940: An Illustrated History of 55 Independent Film Companies, with a Filmography for Each. McFarland & Company, 2005.
