= Drum Taps =

Drum Taps may refer to:

- Drum-Taps, an 1865 collection of poetry by Walt Whitman
- Drum Taps (film), a 1933 film starring Ken Maynard and Dorothy Dix
- Drum Taps (horse), a Thoroughbred racehorse
