= In Old Cheyenne =

In Old Cheyenne may refer to:

- In Old Cheyenne (1931 film), an American film directed by Stuart Paton
- In Old Cheyenne (1941 film), an American film directed by Joseph Kane
