= Beyond the Rio Grande =

1930 film

- Directed by: Harry S. Webb
- Written by: Carl Krusada
- Produced by: Harry S. Webb; Flora E. Douglas
- Starring: Jack Perrin; Franklyn Farnum; Jay Wilsey
- Cinematography: William Nobles
- Edited by: Fred Bain
- Production company: Harry Webb Productions
- Distributed by: Big 4 Film Corporation
- Release date: April 12, 1930
- Running time: 50 minutes
- Country: United States
- Language: English

Beyond the Rio Grande is a 1930 American pre-Code western film directed by Harry S. Webb and starring Jack Perrin, Franklyn Farnum and Jay Wilsey.

== Cast ==
- Jack Perrin as Bert Allen
- Franklyn Farnum as Joe Kemp
- Charline Burt as Betty Burke
- Emma Tansey as Mrs. Burke
- Jay Wilsey as Bill
- Pete Morrison as Al Mooney
- Henry Roquemore as Sheriff
- Edmund Cobb as Dick
- Henry Taylor as Doctor
- Barney Beasley as Henchman
- Herman Hack as Henchman
- Artie Ortego as Vaquero
- Starlight the Horse as Starlight, Bert's Horse

== Bibliography ==
- Munden, Kenneth White. The American Film Institute Catalog of Motion Pictures Produced in the United States, Part 1. University of California Press, 1997.
- Pitts, Michael R. Poverty Row Studios, 1929–1940. McFarland & Company, 2005.
