= Two Gun Justice =

1938 film directed by Alan James

- Theatrical release poster
- Directed by: Alan James
- Written by: Fred Myton
- Produced by: Maurice Conn
- Starring: Tim McCoy; Betty Compson
- Cinematography: Jack Greenhalgh
- Edited by: Richard G. Wray
- Music by: Frank Sanucci
- Production company: Concord Productions
- Distributed by: Monogram Pictures
- Release date: April 30, 1938 (US)
- Running time: 57 minutes
- Country: United States
- Language: English

Two Gun Justice is a 1938 American Western film directed by Alan James from a screenplay by Fred Myton. The film stars Tim McCoy and Betty Compson.

== Cast ==
- Tim McCoy as Tim Carson
- Betty Compson as Kate
- Joan Barclay as Nancy Brown
- John Merton as Bart Kane
- Alan Bridge as Sheriff Tate
- Tony Paton as Blinky
- Allan Cavan as Tex
- Lane Chandler as Butch
- Harry Strang as Joe
- Olin Francis as Blacky
