= Law of the Rio Grande =

1931 film directed by Forrest Sheldon

- Directed by: Forrest Sheldon
- Written by: Betty Burbridge (story and scenario); Bennett Cohen (story and scenario)
- Produced by: F.E. Douglas; Harry S. Webb; George W. Weeks
- Starring: See below
- Cinematography: Herbert Kirkpatrick
- Edited by: Frederick Bain
- Release date: August 9, 1931
- Running time: 57 minutes
- Country: United States
- Language: English

Law of the Rio Grande is a 1931 American Western film directed by Forrest Sheldon.

== Plot ==
Former outlaw Jim Hardy (Bob Custer) finds it hard trying to go straight.

== Cast ==
- Bob Custer as Jim Hardy
- Betty Mack as Judy Lanning
- Carlton S. King as Colonel Lanning
- Nelson McDowell as Wolf Hardy
- Harry Todd as Cookie
- Edmund Cobb as The Blanco Kid
