= Hell's Valley =

1931 film

- Directed by: Alan James
- Written by: Alan James
- Produced by: F.E. Douglas; Harry S. Webb
- Starring: Hal Taliaferro; Virginia Brown Faire; Walter Miller
- Cinematography: William Nobles
- Edited by: Ethel Davey
- Production company: National Players
- Distributed by: Big 4 Film
- Release date: March 7, 1931
- Running time: 55 minutes
- Country: United States
- Language: English

Hell's Valley is a 1931 American pre-Code Western film directed by Alan James and starring Hal Taliaferro, Virginia Brown Faire and Walter Miller. It is a remake of When a Man Rides Alone (1919).

== Synopsis ==
A Captain in the Texas Rangers goes in pursuit of the notorious bandit gang of the Valdez brothers.

== Cast ==
- Hal Taliaferro as Wally, Texas Rangers Captain
- Virginia Brown Faire as Rosita Flores
- Walter Miller as Carlos Valdez
- Franklyn Farnum as Manuel Valdez
- Vivian Rich as Housekeeper
- Lafe McKee as Don Flores
- Jack Phipps as Jose Valdez
- Frank Lackteen as Henchman
- Bobby Dunn as Shorty, Texas Ranger

== Bibliography ==
- Michael R. Pitts. Poverty Row Studios, 1929–1940: An Illustrated History of 55 Independent Film Companies, with a Filmography for Each. McFarland & Company, 2005.
