= The Demon (1926 film) =

1926 American silent Western film

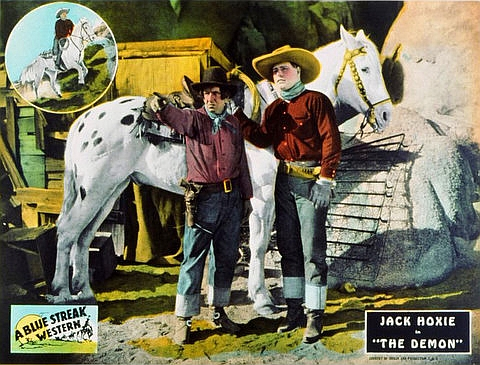
- Directed by: Clifford Smith
- Written by: Buckleigh Fritz Oxford; William C. Beal; Alan James
- Produced by: Carl Laemmle
- Starring: Jack Hoxie; Lola Todd; William Welsh
- Cinematography: William Nobles
- Production company: Universal Pictures
- Distributed by: Universal Pictures
- Release date: January 31, 1926
- Running time: 5 reels
- Country: United States
- Language: Silent (English intertitles)

The Demon is a 1926 American silent Western film directed by Clifford Smith and starring Jack Hoxie, Lola Todd, and William Welsh.

== Plot ==
As described in a film magazine review, raiders are burning the property of cattle ranchers. Dane Gordon, posing as an ex-convict, joins the gang and falls in love with Goldie Fleming, stenographer of Bat Jackson, the brains of the outfit. Dane leads a posse against the outlaws. A plot to blow up Dane and his men fails. The outlaws are rounded up. Bat is shot dead while Dane is stalking him. Dane finds Goldie is largely responsible for their success. She admits she loves Dane.

== Cast ==
- Jack Hoxie as Dane Gordon
- Lola Todd as Goldie Fleming
- William Welsh as Percival Wade
- Jere Austin as Bat Jackson
- Al J. Jennings as Dan Carroll
- George Grandee as The Secretary
- Harry Semels as Joseph Lomax

== Preservation ==
With no holdings located in archives, The Demon is considered a lost film.
