= Swanee River (1931 film) =

1931 film by Raymond Cannon

- Directed by: Raymond Cannon
- Written by: Arthur Hoerl; Barbara Chambers Woods
- Produced by: Harry S. Webb; Flora E. Douglas
- Starring: Grant Withers; Thelma Todd; Philo McCullough
- Cinematography: William Nobles
- Edited by: Fred Bain
- Production company: Sono Art-World Wide Pictures
- Distributed by: Sono Art-World Wide Pictures
- Release date: March 15, 1931
- Running time: 58 minutes
- Country: United States
- Language: English

Swanee River is a 1931 American musical drama film directed by Raymond Cannon and starring Grant Withers, Thelma Todd and Philo McCullough. It is now considered a lost film. There is also an unrelated 1939 film of the same title.

== Plot ==
An energy company plans to flood a Tennessee Valley in order to construct a new hydro power plant. Northern engineer Garry arrives in the area to oversee the project. He falls in love with Caroline, the adopted daughter of local landowner Colonel Bradford but makes an enemy of the Colonel's nephew Jack. Jack kills the Colonel during a dispute and tries to frame Garry. He then destroys a dam which leads to Caroline being trapped in a cave until she is rescued by Garry.

== Cast ==
- Grant Withers as Garry
- Thelma Todd as Caroline
- Philo McCullough as Jack Bradford
- Walter Miller as Morton
- Palmer Morrison as Colonel Bradford
- Robert Frazier as Esau
- The Russell Wooding's Jubilee Singers as Singers

== Bibliography ==
- Munden, Kenneth White. The American Film Institute Catalog of Motion Pictures Produced in the United States, Part 1. University of California Press, 1997.
- Pitts, Michael R. Poverty Row Studios, 1929–1940. McFarland & Company, 2005.
