= The Phantom of the Desert =

1930 film

- Lobby card
- Directed by: Harry S. Webb
- Written by: Carl Krusada
- Produced by: Harry S. Webb; Flora E. Douglas; W. Ray Johnston
- Starring: Jack Perrin; Eva Novak; Josef Swickard
- Cinematography: William Nobles
- Edited by: Fred Bain
- Production company: Metropolitan Pictures
- Distributed by: Syndicate Film Exchange
- Release date: November 1, 1930
- Running time: 58 minutes
- Country: United States
- Language: English

The Phantom of the Desert is a 1930 American pre-Code western film directed by Harry S. Webb and starring Jack Perrin, Eva Novak and Josef Swickard.

== Cast ==
- Jack Perrin as Jack Saunders
- Eva Novak as Mary Van Horn
- Josef Swickard as Colonel Van Horn
- Lila Eccles as Nora (the cook)
- Ben Corbett as Benny Mack
- Edward Earle as Dan Denton
- Robert Walker as Steve (henchman)
- Pete Morrison as Jim (henchman)
- Starlight the Horse as Phantom

== Bibliography ==
- Pitts, Michael R. Western Movies: A Guide to 5,105 Feature Films. McFarland, 2012.
