= In Old Cheyenne (1931 film) =

1931 film

- Directed by: Stuart Paton
- Screenplay by: Betty Burbridge
- Story by: Betty Burbridge
- Produced by: George W. Weeks, Flora E. Douglas
- Starring: Rex Lease, Dorothy Gulliver
- Cinematography: William Nobles
- Distributed by: Sono Art-World Wide Pictures
- Release date: May 25, 1931
- Running time: 62 minutes
- Country: United States
- Language: English

In Old Cheyenne is a 1931 Western film directed by Stuart Paton. It is a re-make of the 1930 film Phantom of the Desert.

== Plot ==
A team of horse rustling ranch foreman and ranch hands who blame a number of missing horses on a wild stallion that lives in the nearby hills. Someone is rustling the horses at the Sutter ranch and the Cheyenne Kid tries to find out who the outlaws really are.

== Cast ==
- Rex Lease as Jim
- Dorothy Gulliver as Helen Sutter
- Jay Hunt as Frank Sutter
- Harry Woods as Winslow
- Harry Todd as Ben
