= A Six Shootin' Romance =

1926 film

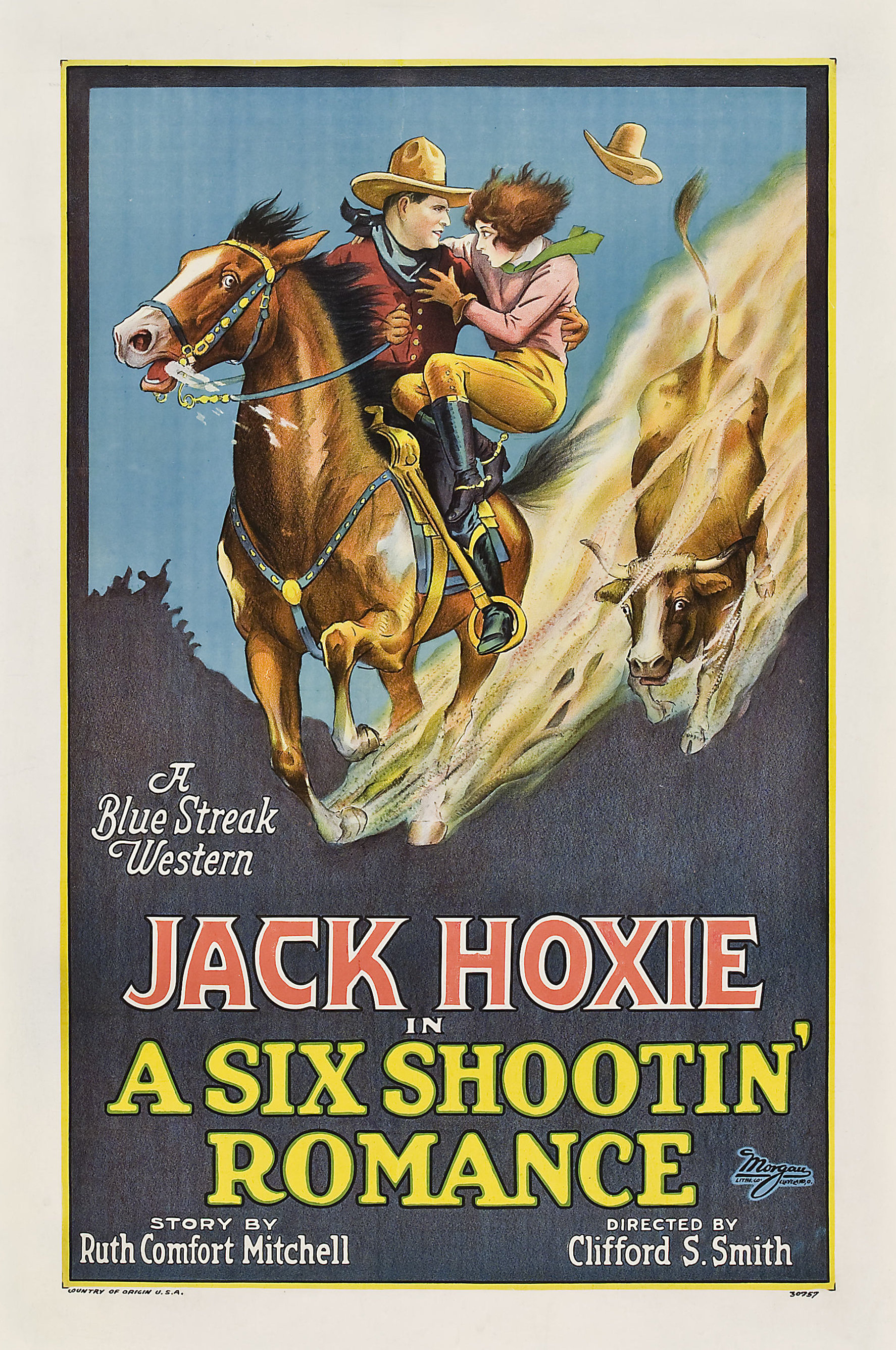
- Film poster
- Directed by: Clifford Smith
- Written by: Alan James; Ruth Comfort Mitchell
- Produced by: Orval Breese
- Starring: Jack Hoxie; Olive Hasbrouck; William Steele
- Cinematography: William Nobles
- Production company: Universal Pictures
- Distributed by: Universal Pictures
- Release date: March 7, 1926
- Running time: 53 minutes
- Country: United States
- Languages: Silent; English intertitles

A Six Shootin' Romance is a lost 1926 American silent Western film directed by Clifford Smith and starring Jack Hoxie, Olive Hasbrouck and William Steele.

== Plot ==
"Lightning" Jack is joint heir to a ranch with eastern society girl Donaldeen Travis.

Although neighboring rancher Currier King is already married, he is attracted to Donaldeen and begins to court her. When Donaldeen learns Currier is married, she spurns his advances. Angered, Currier abducts Donaldeen.

Jack rallies his men to rescue Donaldeen from Currier, and Donaldeen finds that she is in love with Jack.

== Cast ==
- Jack Hoxie as "Lightning" Jack
- Olive Hasbrouck as Donaldeen Travis
- William Steele as Currier King
- Carmen Phillips as Mrs. King
- Robert McKenzie as Ricketts
- Mattie Peters as Mammy
- Virginia Bradford as Muriel Travis

== Production ==
A Six Shootin' Romance was one of several silent films of the 1920s to be shot in the Alabama Hills.

This was Carmen Phillips's final screen performance.

== Preservation ==
With no holdings located in archives, A Six Shootin' Romance is considered a lost film.
