= Tombstone Canyon =

1932 film

- Directed by: Alan James
- Written by: Claude Rister (story); Earle Snell (adaptation)
- Produced by: Samuel Bischoff (producer); Burt Kelly (producer); William Saal (producer); Irving Starr (supervising producer)
- Starring: See below
- Cinematography: Ted D. McCord
- Edited by: David Berg
- Release date: December 25, 1932
- Running time: 62 minutes
- Country: United States
- Language: English

Tombstone Canyon is a 1932 American Western film directed by Alan James.

== Plot ==
The Phantom Killer is on the loose with Ken (Ken Maynard) on his trail. He in turn is chased by a lynch mob.

== Cast ==
- Ken Maynard as Ken
- Tarzan as Tarzan (Ken's horse)
- Cecilia Parker as Jenny Lee
- Sheldon Lewis as Matt Daley (The Phantom)
- Frank Brownlee as Alf Sykes
- Jack Clifford as Newt
- George Gerwing as Clem Sykes
- Lafe McKee as Colonel Lee
- Edward Peil Sr. as Sheriff (replaced by Bob Burns)

The film as released on DVD in 2009.
