= Those We Love =

1932 film

- Directed by: Robert Florey
- Written by: George Abbott (play); S.K. Lauren (play); F. Hugh Herbert (screenplay)
- Produced by: John Golden
- Starring: Mary Astor; Kenneth MacKenna
- Cinematography: Arthur Edeson
- Edited by: Rose Loewinger
- Distributed by: Sono Art-World Wide Pictures
- Release date: September 11, 1932
- Running time: 72 minutes
- Country: United States
- Language: English

Those We Love is a 1932 American pre-Code film directed by Robert Florey. It was adapted by F. Hugh Herbert from the play by George Abbott and S.K. Lauren. The film was independently produced and distributed.

== Plot ==
A young author marries the woman who bought the first copy of his book. Their happy married life is later threatened by another woman.

== Cast ==
- Mary Astor as May Ballard
- Kenneth MacKenna as Freddie Williston
- Lilyan Tashman as Valerie
- Hale Hamilton as Blake
- Earle Foxe as Bert Parker
- Forrester Harvey as Jake
- Virginia Sale as Bertha
- Pat O'Malley as Daley
- Harvey Clark as Mr. Hart
- Cecil Cunningham as Mrs. Henry Abbott
- Edwin Maxwell as Marshall
