= Untamed Justice =

1929 film

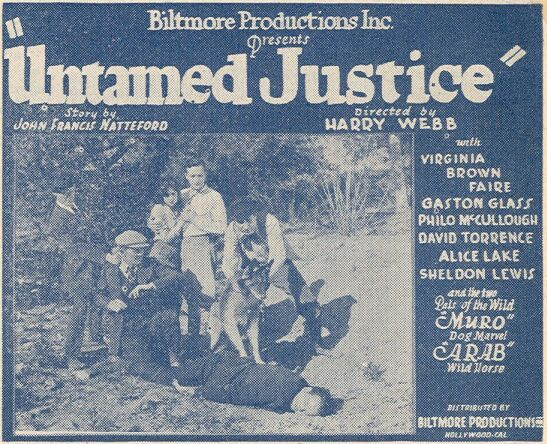
- Directed by: Harry S. Webb
- Written by: Jack Natteford
- Produced by: Flora E. Douglas; Harry S. Webb
- Starring: Virginia Brown Faire; Gaston Glass; David Torrence
- Cinematography: Arthur Reeves
- Edited by: Fred Bain
- Production company: Biltmore Productions
- Distributed by: Biltmore Productions
- Release date: January 22, 1929
- Running time: 50 minutes
- Country: United States
- Languages: Silent; English intertitles

Untamed Justice is a 1929 American silent action film directed by Harry S. Webb and starring Virginia Brown Faire, Gaston Glass and David Torrence.

== Cast ==
- Virginia Brown Faire as Louise Hill
- Gaston Glass as Norman Bard, Air Mail Pilot
- David Torrence as George Morrow, Investment Broker
- Philo McCullough as Herbert Winslow
- Alice Lake as Ann
- Tom London as Henchman Jim
- Sheldon Lewis as Sheriff
- Muro the Dog as Muro
- Arab the Horse as Arab

== Bibliography ==
- Connelly, Robert B. The Silents: Silent Feature Films, 1910-36, Volume 40, Issue 2. December Press, 1998.
- Munden, Kenneth White. The American Film Institute Catalog of Motion Pictures Produced in the United States, Part 1. University of California Press, 1997.
