= Firebrand Jordan =

1930 film

- Directed by: Alan James
- Written by: Carl Krusada
- Produced by: Harry S. Webb; Flora E. Douglas
- Starring: Lane Chandler; Sheldon Lewis; Yakima Canutt
- Cinematography: William Nobles
- Edited by: Fred Bain
- Production company: Harry Webb Productions
- Distributed by: Big 4 Film Corporation
- Release date: January 28, 1930
- Running time: 55 minutes
- Country: United States
- Language: English

Firebrand Jordan is a 1930 American pre-Code western film directed by Alan James and starring Lane Chandler, Sheldon Lewis and Yakima Canutt.

== Cast ==
- Lane Chandler as Firebrand Jordan
- Aline Goodwin as Joan Howe
- Yakima Canutt as Red Carson
- Sheldon Lewis as David Hampton
- Marguerite Ainslee as Peggy Howe
- Tom London as Ed Burns
- Lew Meehan as Spike
- Frank Yaconelli as Tony
- Alfred Hewston as Ah Sing
- Fred Harvey as Judd Howe
- Cliff Lyons as Pete
- Thomas G. Lingham as Henchman

== Bibliography ==
- Munden, Kenneth White. The American Film Institute Catalog of Motion Pictures Produced in the United States, Part 1. University of California Press, 1997.
- Pitts, Michael R. Poverty Row Studios, 1929–1940. McFarland & Company, 2005.
