= Red Fork Range =

1931 film

- Directed by: Alan James
- Written by: Henry Taylor; Alan James
- Produced by: Harry S. Webb; Flora E. Douglas
- Starring: Hal Taliaferro; Ruth Mix; Al Ferguson
- Cinematography: William Nobles
- Edited by: Ethel Davey
- Production company: National Players
- Distributed by: Big 4 Film
- Release date: January 12, 1931
- Running time: 59 minutes
- Country: United States
- Language: English

Red Fork Range is a 1931 American pre-Code Western film directed by Alan James and starring Hal Taliaferro, Ruth Mix and Al Ferguson.

== Main cast ==
- Hal Taliaferro as Wally Hamilton
- Ruth Mix as Ruth Farell
- Al Ferguson as Black Bard
- Cliff Lyons as 'Skeeter' Beldon
- Bud Osborne as 'Whip' Roden
- Lafe McKee as Charles Farell / Colonel Leading Wagon Train
- Will Armstrong as Sergeant O'Flaherty
- George Gerwing as Henchman Steve Alden
- Jim Corey as 'Apache' Joe
- Chief John Big Tree as Chief Barking Fox

== Plot ==
Hamilton wins a stagecoach race, overcomes a group of troublesome Indians, and rescues Farrel from outlaw Bard.

== Bibliography ==
- Michael R. Pitts. Poverty Row Studios, 1929–1940: An Illustrated History of 55 Independent Film Companies, with a Filmography for Each. McFarland & Company, 2005.
