= Rose Loewinger =

American film editor

- Born: April 4, 1902; Manhattan, New York, USA
- Died: September 14, 2000 (aged 98); Los Angeles, California, USA
- Occupation(s): Film editor, script supervisor

Rose Loewinger (sometimes credited as R.E. Loewinger) was an American film editor and script supervisor active from the 1920s through the 1950s.

== Biography ==
Rose was born in Manhattan to Jacob Loewinger and Julie Gutman. She got her start in Hollywood working as a secretary to Myron Stearns. After editing films for most of the 1920s and 1930s, in the 1940s and 1950s, she took her expertise and applied it to a new path as a script supervisor.

== Selected filmography (as editor) ==
- Assassin of Youth (1937)
- Goodbye Love (1933)
- Deluge (1933)
- The Big Brain (1933)
- Tomorrow at Seven (1933)
- A Study in Scarlet (1933 film) (1933)
- The Constant Woman (1933)
- Racetrack (1933)
- The Death Kiss (1932)
- Uptown New York (1932)
- False Faces (1932)
- Those We Love (1932)
- The Last Mile (1932)
- The Man Called Back (1932)
- Whistlin' Dan (1932)
- Hotel Continental (1932)
- Salvation Nell (1931)
- Behind Office Doors (1931)
- Beau Sabreur (1928)
- Two Flaming Youths (1927)
