= Air Police (film) =

1931 film

- Lobby card
- Directed by: Stuart Paton
- Written by: Arthur Hoerl (original story) Bennett Cohen (scenario) (story); Bennett Cohen (scenario, dialogue)
- Produced by: George W. Weeks; Flora E. Douglas
- Starring: Kenneth Harlan; Josephine Dunn; Richard Cramer; Charles Delaney
- Cinematography: William Nobles
- Edited by: Carl Himm
- Production company: George W. Weeks Productions (as Thrill-O-Drama)
- Distributed by: Sono Art-World Wide Pictures; William Steiner
- Release date: April 10, 1931
- Running time: 64 minutes
- Country: United States
- Language: English

Air Police is a 1931 aviation sound film about air police produced by George W. Weeks Productions (as Thrill-O-Drama). It was distributed by Sono Art-World Wide Pictures and William Steiner Productions. Air Police was directed by Stuart Paton and stars Kenneth Harlan, Josephine Dunn, Richard Cramer and Charles Delaney. (Note: The technological problems of filming with sound in an aviation environment would take a while to solve, with Air Police one of the first sound films to tackle the problems.)

== Plot ==
U.S. Army Air Corps buddies Lt. Jerry Doyle (Kenneth Harlan) and Lt. Andy Conroy (Charles Delaney) enlist in the U.S. Air Patrol. They are assigned to the mission of fighting alien-smuggling along the USA-Mexico border. When the pair are sent across the Mexican border disguised as smugglers to break up a gang, they both fall in love with Dolores (Josephine Dunn), the dancer in a Mexican cantina where the smugglers led by Pascal (Richard Cramer), hang out.

When Andy visits Dolores at the cantina, he is captured by the smugglers. One of the gang discover the aircraft that Jerry and Andy have hidden away and see the air patrol logo on its side. Andy escapes and takes off in his aircraft, followed by the smugglers. In the air battle that follows, Andy is shot down, but before he dies, he relays a message to Jerry.

Refusing help from his fellow air police, Jerry determines to avenge Andy's death. Suspecting that Dolores was helping Pascal, he flies across the border to confronts her at the cantina. While at the cantina, Jerry is captured by Pascal who ties up Jerry and places him in the cockpit of his own aircraft, but Dolores comes to help him escape.

Pascal follows in his aircraft using Dolores as a hostage. During the ensuing battle, Dolores parachutes to safety and Pascal is killed. After Jerry lands, Dolores explains that she had nothing to do with Andy's death, and she and Jerry are reconciled.

== Cast ==
- Kenneth Harlan as Lt. Jerry Doyle
- Josephine Dunn as Dolores
- Richard Cramer as Pascal
- Charles Delaney as Lt. Andy Conroy
- Arthur Thalasso as "Panama Joe"
- Tom London as "Spike", Joe's Henchman
- George Chesebro as "Curley", Joe's Henchman

== Production ==
Air Police was produced by George Weeks and his small company, "Thrill-O-Dramas" which claimed to provide films that would stand out from the first talking movies. Shot by a veteran of the silent films, Stuart Paton, Air Police should be considered one of the first independent productions of the era of "talking pictures".

Although the film was an aviation adventure film, nearly all the scenes were shot in studio sets and "... despite its title and its dramatic poster, aerial scenes are rare and unconvincing; the action takes place largely indoors, especially in a Mexican cabaret." Air Police featured two aircraft, with a Travel Air 3000 flown by the "Air Patrol" and the other, a Catron & Fisk CA 11.

== Reception ==
Aviation film historian James H. Farmer in Celluloid Wings: The Impact of Movies on Aviation (1984) characterized Air Police as a "youth-oriented aerial thriller", but also called it, "amateurish."

Film reviewer Hal Erickson had a positive review of Air Police, writing recently, "Sono Art-World Wide, an enterprising minor-league studio of the early talkie era, did its best to seek out subject matter that would guarantee a respectable box-office showing. Air Police has an alluring title and some first-class aerial photography, but otherwise is a standard cops-and-robbers caper.
