= Phantom Thunderbolt =

1933 film by Alan James

- Theatrical release poster
- Directed by: Alan James
- Written by: Forrest Sheldon (story) & Betty Burbridge (story) and Forrest Sheldon (continuity); Betty Burbridge (continuity); Alan James
- Produced by: Samuel Bischoff (producer); Burt Kelly (producer); William Saal (producer); Irving Starr
- Cinematography: Jackson Rose
- Edited by: David Berg
- Distributed by: Sono Art-World Wide Pictures
- Release date: March 5, 1933
- Running time: 63 minutes
- Country: United States
- Language: English

Phantom Thunderbolt is a 1933 American pre-Code Western film directed by Alan James.

== Cast ==
- Ken Maynard as Thunderbolt Kid
- Frances Lee as Judy Lane
- Frank Rice as Nevady
- William Gould as "Red" Matthews
- Bob Kortman as "One-Shot" Mallory
- Frank Beal as Tobias Oldham
- Wilfred Lucas as Mr. Eaton (railroad president)
