= Between Fighting Men =

1932 film directed by Forrest Sheldon

- Directed by: Forrest Sheldon
- Written by: Betty Burbridge; Forrest Sheldon
- Produced by: Samuel Bischoff; Burt Kelly; William Saal
- Starring: Ken Maynard; Ruth Hall; Josephine Dunn
- Cinematography: Ted D. McCord
- Edited by: David Berg
- Production company: K.B.S. Productions Inc.
- Distributed by: Sono Art-World Wide Pictures
- Release date: October 16, 1932
- Running time: 59 minutes
- Country: United States
- Language: English

Between Fighting Men is a 1932 American western film directed by Forrest Sheldon and starring Ken Maynard, Ruth Hall and Josephine Dunn. It was produced on Poverty Row as a second feature and distributed by Sono Art-World Wide Pictures.

== Plot ==
Ken Thompson tries to mediate the violence between the rival cowboys and shepherds, but things are made harder when the father of Judy is killed.

== Cast ==
- Ken Maynard as Ken Thompson
- Ruth Hall as Judy Winters
- Josephine Dunn as Goldie
- Wallace MacDonald as Wally Thompson
- Albert J. Smith as Butch Martin
- Walter Law as Dad Thompson
- James Bradbury Jr. as Higgie - Thompson Ranch Hand
- Jack Pratt as Sheriff Gorman
- Jack Curtis as Jack - Saloon Owner
- Jack Perrin as Pete - Martin Henchman
- Buck Connors as Dad Winters
- Edmund Cobb as Henchman
- Charles Brinley as Barfly
- Robert Walker as Man Who Reports Murder

== Bibliography ==
- Pitts, Michael R. Poverty Row Studios, 1929–1940: An Illustrated History of 55 Independent Film Companies, with a Filmography for Each. McFarland & Company, 2005.
- Tuska, Jon. The Vanishing Legion: A History of Mascot Pictures, 1927-1935. McFarland, 1999.
