= Westward Bound (1930 film) =

1930 film

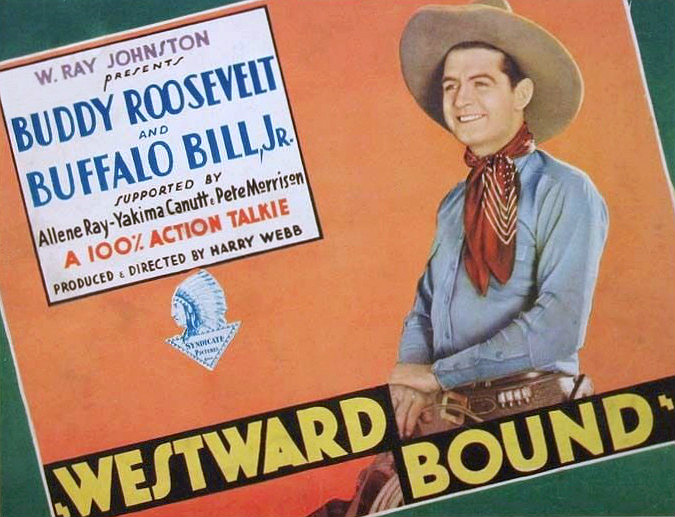
- Directed by: Harry S. Webb
- Written by: Carl Krusada
- Produced by: Harry S. Webb; Flora E. Douglas; W. Ray Johnston
- Starring: Jay Wilsey; Allene Ray; Buddy Roosevelt
- Cinematography: William Nobles
- Edited by: Fred Bain
- Production company: Metropolitan Pictures
- Distributed by: Syndicate Film Exchange
- Release date: December 1, 1930
- Running time: 55 minutes
- Country: United States
- Language: English

Westward Bound is a 1930 American pre-Code western film directed by Harry S. Webb and starring Jay Wilsey, Allene Ray and Buddy Roosevelt.

== Cast ==
- Jay Wilsey as Bob Lansing
- Allene Ray as Marge Holt
- Buddy Roosevelt as Frank (Ranch Foreman)
- Fern Emmett as Emma
- Ben Corbett as Ben
- Yakima Canutt as Jim (gang leader)
- Tom London as Dick (rustler)
- Robert Walker as Steve (henchman)
- Pete Morrison as rustler
- Frank Ellis as car thief
- Henry Roquemore as Tony (bartender)

== Bibliography ==
- Munden, Kenneth White. The American Film Institute Catalog of Motion Pictures Produced in the United States, Part 1. University of California Press, 1997.
- Pitts, Michael R. Poverty Row Studios, 1929–1940. McFarland & Company, 2005.
