= Uptown New York =

1932 film

- Uptown New York theatrical poster
- Directed by: Victor Schertzinger
- Written by: Viña Delmar (story "Uptown Woman"); Warren Duff (writer)
- Starring: Jack Oakie; Shirley Grey; Leon Ames
- Cinematography: Norbert Brodine
- Edited by: Rose Loewinger
- Music by: Val Burton
- Production company: K.B.S. Productions
- Distributed by: Sono Art-World Wide Pictures
- Release date: November 27, 1932
- Running time: 80 minutes
- Country: United States
- Language: English

Uptown New York is a 1932 American pre-Code romantic drama film directed by Victor Schertzinger and starring Jack Oakie, Shirley Grey and Leon Ames. It is based on the story by Vina Delmar.

== Plot summary ==
Pat and Max are in love and share an intimate relationship. However, after Max receives his surgeon's diploma, his parents have arranged a marriage for him with a woman from a rich, good background. He marries that woman but occasionally bumps into Pat, explaining how he actually loves her instead of his wife. Pat dislikes the idea of him seeing her on the side. Heartbroken, Pat later meets Eddie (a gumball machine salesman), who proposes marriage, which she accepts. In a hotel bridal suite, Pat mentions her previous relationship to Eddie, and mentions that he can walk out on her if he wants, he is OK with it.

Later, While attempting to stop two teenagers from robbing one of Eddie's gumball machines, she runs across the street without looking and is struck by a truck. She is in the hospital awaiting surgery. Eddie, chooses Max as the surgeon and, later while Pat is in her hospital bed, overhears Max's conversation with Pat about their love, and his decision to divorce his wife, he will take Pat to Vienna to get well, and they will get married. Eddie decides to walk out on Pat as he believes that she is going to run off with Max. Through complications (and a fight) over Eddie's attempt to pay Pat's hospital bill by selling his company which he only owns half of (Pat owns the other half), he ends up in jail. Pat runs to the jail and explains the misunderstanding and proclaims her love for Eddie.

== Cast ==
- Jack Oakie as Eddie Doyle
- Shirley Grey as Patricia Smith
- Leon Ames as Max Silver (billed as Leon Waycoff)
- George Cooper as Al
- Lee Moran as Hotel Clerk
- Alexander Carr as Papa Silver
- Raymond Hatton as Slot Machine King
- Henry Armetta as Nick, Restaurant Proprietor

== Reception ==
Time reviewed the film and said after summarizing the story that "Uptown New York was written by Vina Delmar with dangerous recklessness as to motivation but with a good eye for local color. The hero and heroine meet each other in a ladies' room—which, as the cinema becomes less pastoral, is growing in popularity as a romantic setting—but thereafter the story manages to keep closer to the kitchen than the bathroom."

The New York Times wrote "Presented with a rather engaging simplicity, if with no particular distinction, [Uptown New York] makes an effective minor entertainment" and "After the first shock of watching Jack Oakie suffering the emotions that go with tears, it is possible to accept the comedian as a dramatic actor of considerable effectiveness in "Uptown New York" [...] In several scenes Mr. Oakie cavorts with Henry Armetta and George Cooper for the purposes of comedy, but the effect is not notably humorous. Shirley Grey as the wife gives a quietly effective performance. Leon Waycoff is properly aware of his winning qualities as the lover."

== Bibliography ==
- Pitts, Michael R. Poverty Row Studios, 1929-1940: An Illustrated History of 55 Independent Film Companies, with a Filmography for Each. McFarland & Company, 2005.
