= The Fighting Peacemaker =

1926 film

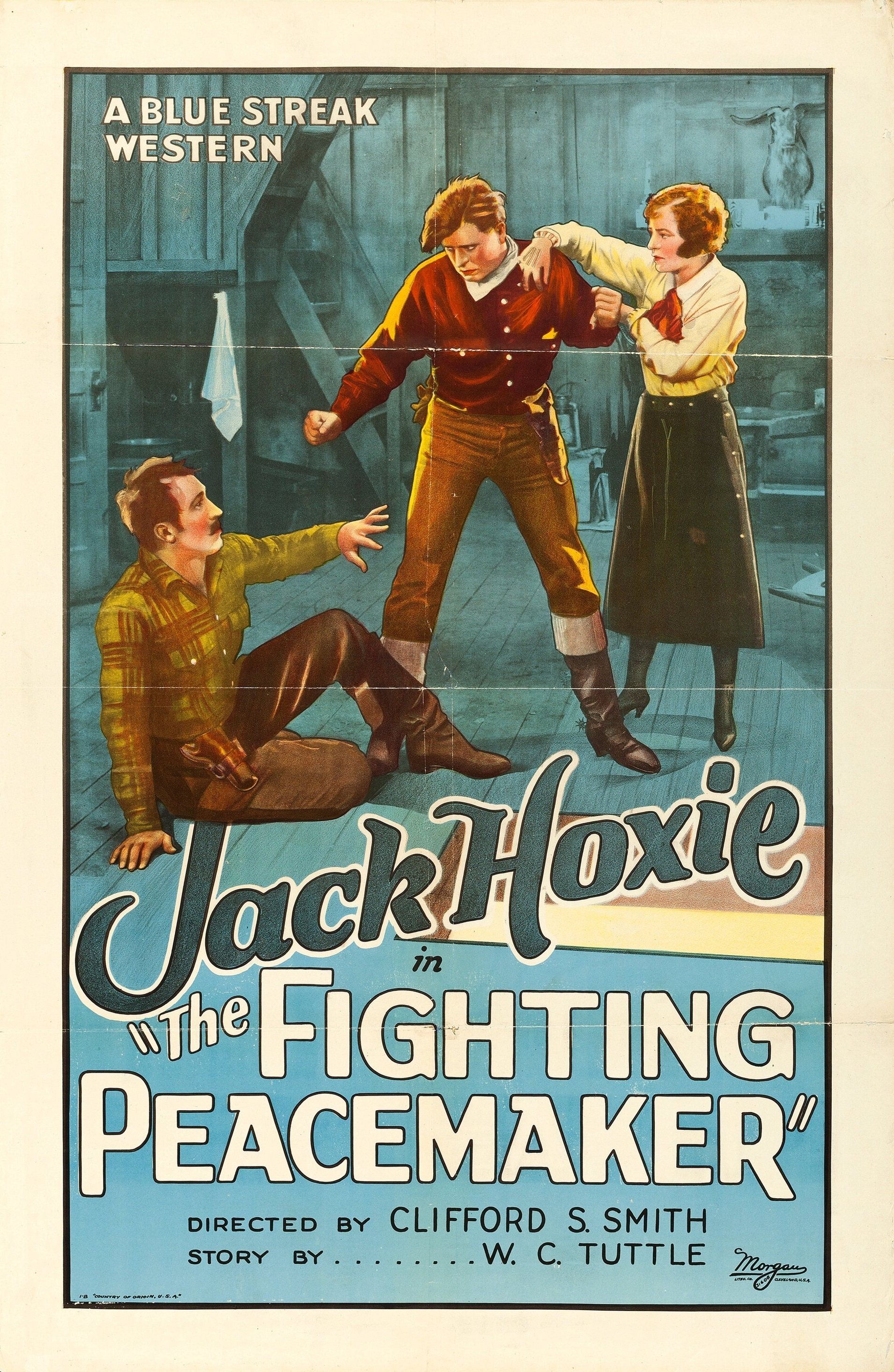
- Directed by: Clifford Smith
- Written by: Alan James; Harrison Jacobs
- Produced by: Carl Laemmle
- Starring: Jack Hoxie; Lola Todd; Ted Oliver
- Cinematography: William Nobles
- Production company: Universal Pictures
- Distributed by: Universal Pictures
- Release date: July 7, 1926
- Running time: 55 minutes
- Country: United States
- Language: Silent (English intertitles)

The Fighting Peacemaker is a 1926 American silent Western film directed by Clifford Smith and starring Jack Hoxie, Lola Todd, and Ted Oliver.

== Plot ==
As described in a film magazine review, Peace Parker returns to Tarp City after serving a jail sentence on a false charges, returns home determined to get the man who framed him. He hears Jess Marshall, the young woman that he loves, is engaged to another man. Learning that there is a plot to run sheep onto the Marshall ranch grounds, Peace, with the assistance of Hanna, a fat Hobo, leads the cowmen against the sheepherders. Jess is kidnapped. Peace rescues her and learns that she is still true to him. The plotters are defeated and his innocence established.

== Cast ==
- Jack Hoxie as 'Peace River' Parker
- Lola Todd as Jess Marshall
- Ted Oliver as Jefferson Crane
- William Steele as Clell Danert
- Robert McKenzie as Hanna
- Clark Comstock as Mr. Marshall as Jess's Father
- Frank Rice as Sheriff

== Preservation ==
With no holdings located in archives, The Fighting Peacemaker is considered a lost film.
