= King of the Arena =

1933 film

- Directed by: Alan James
- Screenplay by: Alan James
- Story by: Hal Berger; Ray Bouk
- Produced by: Ken Maynard; Irving Starr
- Starring: Ken Maynard; Lucile Browne; John St. Polis; Bob Kortman; Michael Visaroff; James A. Marcus
- Cinematography: Ted D. McCord
- Edited by: Charles Harris
- Music by: James Dietrich
- Production company: Universal Pictures
- Distributed by: Universal Pictures
- Release date: June 1, 1933
- Running time: 59 minutes
- Country: United States
- Language: English

King of the Arena is a 1933 American pre-Code Western film written and directed by Alan James. The film stars Ken Maynard, Lucile Browne, John St. Polis, Bob Kortman, Michael Visaroff and James A. Marcus. The film was released on June 1, 1933, by Universal Pictures.

== Plot ==
A former circus performer, Ken Kenton becomes personally involved when a mysterious criminal organization called Black Death appears to be targeting a circus troupe.

Ken is reunited with the circus owner's daughter, Mary Hiller, and crosses the path of Bargoff, a bronco rider who resents Ken and tries to get him killed in a knife-throwing act. After a Russian baron named Petroff assists him when Bargoff robs the circus and kidnaps Mary, it turns out Petroff is the ringleader of the Black Death. A confrontation leaves Ken and Mary safe to proceed with their lives.

== Cast ==
- Ken Maynard as Captain Ken Kenton
- Lucile Browne as Mary Hiller
- John St. Polis as Governor
- Bob Kortman as Bargoff
- Michael Visaroff as Baron Petroff
- James A. Marcus as Colonel Hiller
- Jack Rockwell as Ranger Jack Saunders
- Frank Rice as Tin Star
- Bobby Nelson as Jimmy Hiller
- Jack Mower as Rurales Captain Rodriguez
- Tarzan as Tarzan
