= Racetrack (1933 film) =

1933 film by James Cruze

- Directed by: James Cruze
- Written by: Walter Lang, Douglas Doty, Wells Root, J. Walter Ruben
- Produced by: Samuel Zierler
- Starring: Leo Carrillo; Junior Coughlan; Kay Hammond
- Cinematography: Charles Schoenbaum
- Edited by: Rose Loewinger
- Production company: James Cruze Productions
- Distributed by: Sono Art-World Wide Pictures; Fox Film Corporation
- Release date: February 25, 1933
- Running time: 79 minutes
- Country: United States
- Language: English

Racetrack is a 1933 American pre-Code drama directed by James Cruze and starring Leo Carrillo, Junior Coughlan and Kay Hammond. This film is now considered lost.

== Plot ==
Horse racing bookmaker Joe Tomasso becomes involved with homeless waif Jackie Curtis whose mother abandoned him some years before. Tomasso acts as the young boy's unofficial guardian and agrees to allow him to become a jockey with the stipulation that all his races must be honest ones. Jackie's mother Myra shows up and wants them to be a family again. She becomes upset over her son's involvement in the sport of racing. Tomasso deliberately creates a situation to drive a wedge between himself and Jackie so that the youth will return to his mother.

== Cast ==
- Leo Carrillo as Joe Tomasso
- Junior Coughlan as Jackie Curtis
- Kay Hammond as Myra Curtis
- Lee Moran as "Horseface"
- Huntley Gordon as Attorney
- Wilfred Lucas as Mr. Ryan
- Joseph W. Girard as Judge

== See also ==
- List of films about horses
- List of films about horse racing
