= Drum Taps (film) =

1933 film

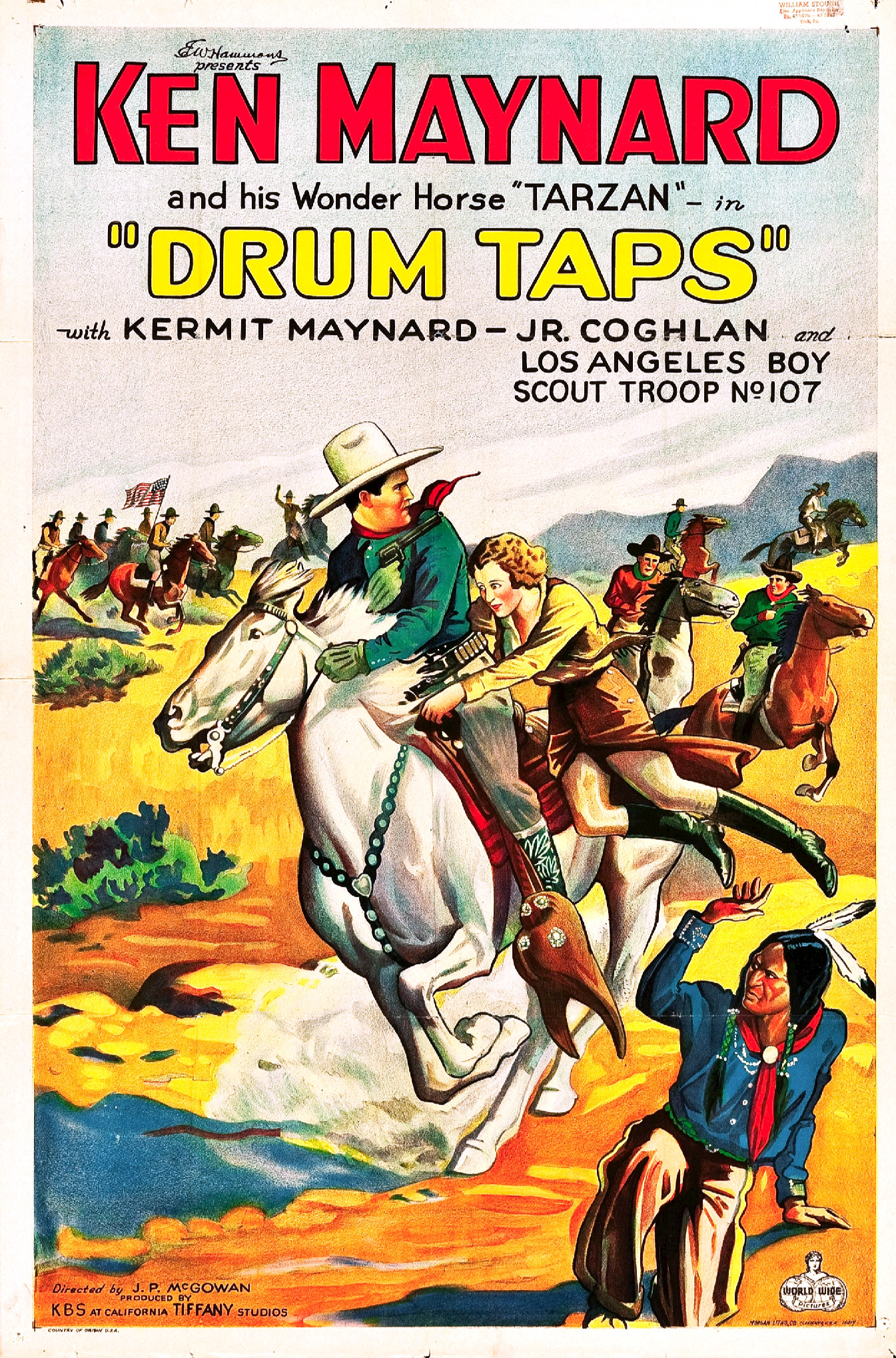
- Theatrical release poster
- Directed by: J.P. McGowan
- Written by: Alan James (story); J.P. McGowan (screenplay)
- Produced by: Samuel Bischoff (producer); Burt Kelly (producer); William Saal (producer)
- Cinematography: Jack Young
- Edited by: David Berg
- Production companies: K.B.S. Productions Inc. Sono Art-World Wide Pictures
- Release date: 1933
- Running time: 61 minutes
- Country: United States
- Language: English

Drum Taps is a 1933 American pre-Code Western film directed and co-written by J.P. McGowan. It stars Ken Maynard and his brother Kermit Maynard playing brothers.

== Plot summary ==
The Skinner Cattle Company is scheming to take over the valley by running ranchers off their homesteads. Their main opposition comes from Ken Cartwright who they attempt to frame by making it look like Ken rustled cattle. Ken escapes, but faced with the problem of the Skinner's outlaws using Rocky Pass as a fortress he enlists the aid of Los Angeles Boy Scout Troop #107.

== Cast ==
- Ken Maynard as Ken Cartwright
- Tarzan as Ken's Horse
- Dorothy Dix as Eileen Carey
- Frank Coghlan Jr. as Eric Cartwright
- Charles Stevens as Indian Joe
- Al Bridge as Lariat Smith
- Harry Semels as Henchman Pete
- Jim Mason as Henchman Stubby Lane
- Slim Whitaker as Henchman Hank
- Kermit Maynard as Scoutmaster Earl Cartwright
- Hooper Atchley as Bradley Skinner
- Lloyd Ingraham as Bill Carey, Eileen Carey's Grandfather
