= The Constant Woman =

1933 film

- Directed by: Victor Schertzinger
- Written by: Eugene O'Neill (play Recklessness ) Warren Duff (adaptation and dialogue) and F. Hugh Herbert (adaptation and dialogue)
- Produced by: Victor Schertzinger (producer)
- Starring: Conrad Nagel; Leila Hyams; Claire Windsor
- Cinematography: Arthur Edeson
- Edited by: Rose Loewinger
- Distributed by: Sono Art-World Wide Pictures
- Release date: 1933
- Running time: 76 minutes (American original release); 70 minutes (American reissue)
- Country: United States

The Constant Woman (1933), also known as Auction in Souls and Hell in a Circus, is an American Pre-Code film directed by Victor Schertzinger. It is based on the 1913 Eugene O'Neill play Recklessness.

== Plot ==
Marlene Underwood is a star circus performer, whose husband Walt buys the circus while their son Jimmie worships everything his mother does. Marlene leaves them both to go join a larger show, then is killed in a fire, resulting in Walt going into a downward spiral of alcohol and sorrow.

A woman called Lou helps restore Walt's faith in human nature, but she is resented by young Jimmie, who feels she is trying to take his mother's place. Walt gets back on his feet, but now must try to stop Jimmie from joining the circus himself.

== Cast ==
- Conrad Nagel as Walt Underwood
- Leila Hyams as Lou
- Tommy Conlon as Jimmie Underwood
- Claire Windsor as Marlene Underwood
- Stanley Fields as "Beef"
- Fred Kohler as Bouncer
- Alexander Carr as J.J. Brock
- Robert Ellis as Leading Man
- Lionel Belmore as Character Man
- Ruth Clifford as Floozie
