= The Man Called Back =

1932 film

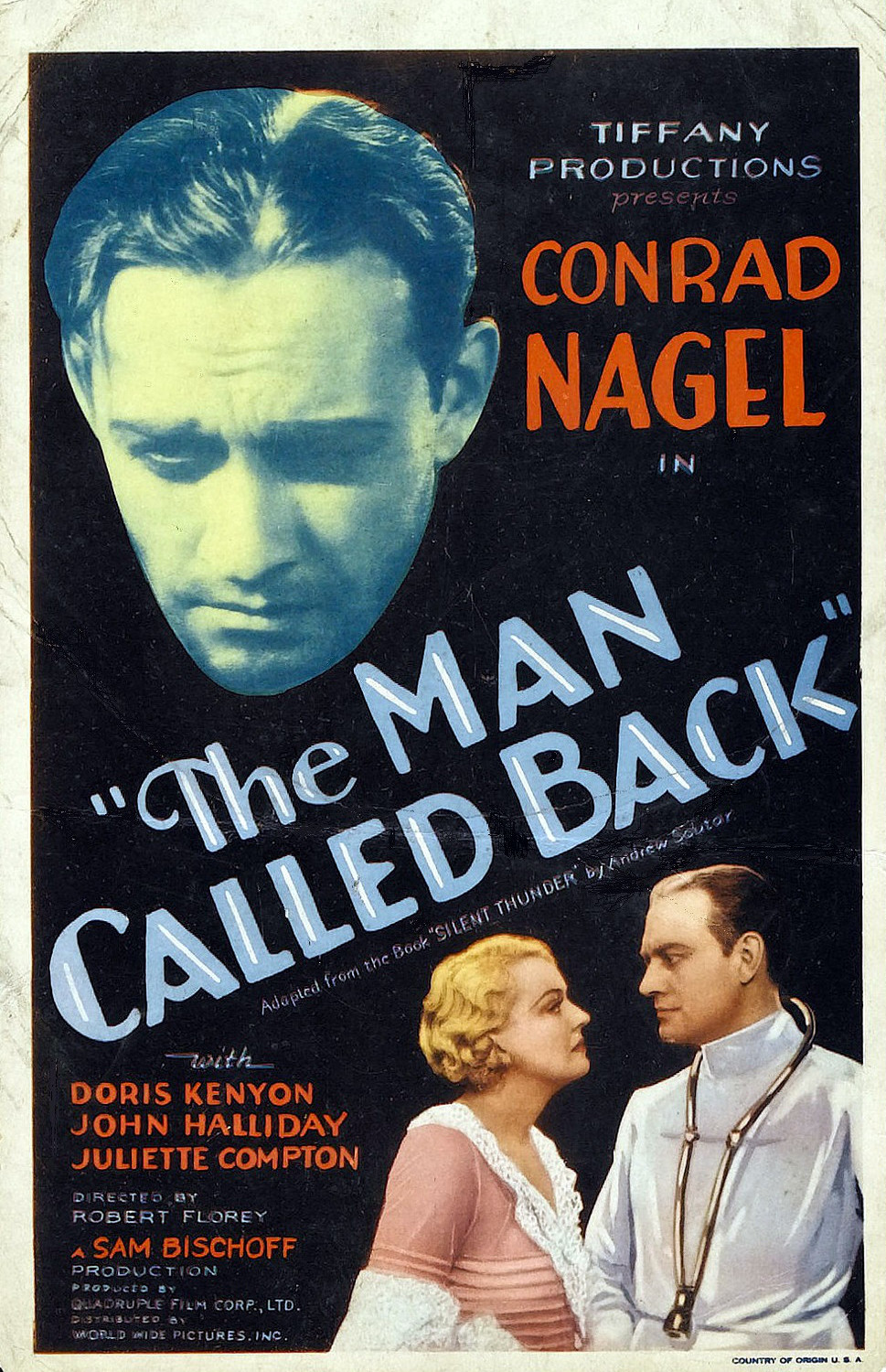
- Theatrical release poster
- Directed by: Robert Florey
- Written by: Robert Florey; Robert Presnell Sr. Based on the novel Silent Thunder by Andrew Soutar
- Cinematography: Henry Sharp
- Edited by: Rose Loewinger
- Distributed by: Tiffany Pictures
- Release date: July 17, 1932
- Running time: 79 minutes
- Country: United States
- Language: English

The Man Called Back is a 1932 American Pre-Code film directed by Robert Florey.

This film was independently produced for the bargain-basement price of $68,000, partly because Florey was allowed to re-use the tropical set constructed for the RKO Radio Pictures film Bird of Paradise (1932).

== Plot ==
A disgraced doctor exiles himself to the South Seas, and is rehabilitated by meeting a society woman and her irresponsible husband. He returns to London.

== Cast ==
- Conrad Nagel as Dr. David Yorke
- Doris Kenyon as Diana St. Claire
- John Halliday as Gordon St. Claire
- Juliette Compton as Vivien Lawrence
- Reginald Owen as Dr. Atkins
- Mona Maris as Lilaya
- Alan Mowbray as King's Counsel
- Gilbert Emery as Defense Counsel
- Mae Busch as Rosie
- Lionel Belmore as Mr. Cartright
- Winter Hall as Judge
- May Beatty as Mrs. Lucy Sanderson
- George C. Pearce as Mr. Sanderson
