= Strawberry Roan (1933 film) =

1933 film directed by Alan James

- Directed by: Alan James
- Written by: Nate Gatzert
- Produced by: Ken Maynard; Carl Laemmle
- Starring: Ken Maynard; Ruth Hall; Harold Goodwin
- Cinematography: Ted D. McCord
- Edited by: Charles Harris
- Production company: Ken Maynard Productions
- Distributed by: Universal Pictures
- Release date: October 26, 1933
- Running time: 59 minutes
- Country: United States
- Language: English

Strawberry Roan is a 1933 American pre-Code Western film directed by Alan James and starring Ken Maynard, Ruth Hall and Harold Goodwin.

== Cast ==
- Ken Maynard as Ken Masters
- Ruth Hall as Alice Edwards
- Harold Goodwin as Bart Hawkins
- Frank Yaconelli as Shanty
- James A. Marcus as Big Jim Edwards
- William Desmond as Colonel Brownlee
- Charles King as Curley
- Jack Rockwell as Henchman Beef
- Robert D. Walker as Bat
- Bill Patton as Ranch Hand Slim

== Bibliography ==
- Pitts, Michael R. Western Movies: A Guide to 5,105 Feature Films. McFarland, 2012.
