= The Lone Trail =

1932 film by Forrest Sheldon and Harry S. Webb

- Directed by: Forrest Sheldon; Harry S. Webb
- Written by: Betty Burbridge; Bennett Cohen
- Based on: Skull and Crown by James Oliver Curwood
- Produced by: Flora E. Douglas; Harry S. Webb
- Starring: Rex Lease; Virginia Brown Faire; Jack Mower
- Cinematography: William Nobles
- Edited by: Fred Bain
- Production company: Metropolitan Pictures
- Distributed by: Metropolitan Film Exchange
- Release date: March 1, 1932
- Running time: 61 minutes
- Country: United States
- Language: English

The Lone Trail is a 1932 American pre-Code Western film directed by Forrest Sheldon and Harry S. Webb and starring Rex Lease, Virginia Brown Faire and Jack Mower. It was produced as a second feature on Poverty Row. According to a modern source it partly used edited footage from the earlier serial The Sign of the Wolf, although no contemporary confirmation of this exists. It has strong similarities to the plot of the 1935 film Skull and Crown which was based on an earlier story James Oliver Curwood.

== Cast ==
- Rex Lease as Ranger Tom Lanning
- Virginia Brown Faire as Ruth Farnum
- Joe Bonomo as Jed
- Billy O'Brien as Bud O'Brien
- Jack Mower as The Tiger
- Robert Walker as Joe
- Harry Todd as John Farnum
- Josephine Hill as Tom's Sister
- Edmund Cobb as Fred

== Bibliography ==
- Pitts, Michael R. Poverty Row Studios, 1929–1940: An Illustrated History of 55 Independent Film Companies, with a Filmography for Each. McFarland & Company, 2005.
