= Dynamite Ranch =

1932 film directed by Forrest Sheldon

- Theatrical release poster
- Directed by: Forrest Sheldon
- Screenplay by: Barry Barrington
- Produced by: E. W. Hammons
- Starring: Ken Maynard; Ruth Hall; Alan Roscoe; Martha Mattox; Arthur Hoyt; Albert J. Smith
- Cinematography: Ted McCord
- Edited by: David Berg
- Production company: K.B.S. Productions Inc.
- Distributed by: Sono Art-World Wide Pictures
- Release date: July 31, 1932
- Running time: 59 minutes
- Country: United States
- Language: English

Dynamite Ranch is a 1932 American Western film directed by Forrest Sheldon and written by Barry Barrington. The film stars Ken Maynard, Ruth Hall, Alan Roscoe, Martha Mattox, Arthur Hoyt and Albert J. Smith. The film was produced by K.B.S. (Burt Kelly, Sam Bischoff and William Saal) Productions released on July 31, 1932, by Sono Art-World Wide Pictures.

The film takes place during modern times and features a costume ball and an automobile chase; there is no dynamite featured in the film. Dynamite Ranch was remade as Unconquered Bandit (1935).

== Plot ==
Blaze Howell stops what he believes is a train robbery, but it is revealed to be a welcoming joke to visitors from the East. It is discovered that during the fake robbery, a real robbery has occurred that involved the death of a guard. Howell is later accused of breaking into a safe, and discovery of his glove at the scene makes things worse for him. Aided by Smithers, Howell sets a trap and captures the real culprit.

== Cast ==
- Ken Maynard as Blaze Howell
- Ruth Hall as Doris Collins
- Alan Roscoe as Park Owens
- Martha Mattox as Aunt Sarah Collins
- Arthur Hoyt as Smithers
- Albert J. Smith as Red
- George C. Pearce as Andrew Collins
