= The Lone Avenger =

- Theatrical release poster
- Directed by: Alan James
- Screenplay by: Forrest Sheldon; Betty Burbridge
- Produced by: Irving Starr
- Starring: Ken Maynard; Muriel Gordon; James Marcus; Alan Bridge; Niles Welch; William Bailey
- Cinematography: William Nobles
- Edited by: David Berg
- Production company: K.B.S. Productions Inc.
- Distributed by: Sono Art-World Wide Pictures
- Release date: May 14, 1933
- Running time: 61 minutes
- Country: United States
- Language: English

The Lone Avenger is a 1933 American Western film directed by Alan James and written by Forrest Sheldon and Betty Burbridge. The film stars Ken Maynard, Muriel Gordon, James Marcus, Alan Bridge, Niles Welch and William Bailey. The film was released on May 14, 1933, by Sono Art-World Wide Pictures.

== Cast ==
- Ken Maynard as Cal Weston
- Muriel Gordon as Ruth Winters
- James Marcus as Jud Winters
- Alan Bridge as Burl Adams
- Niles Welch as Martin Carter
- William Bailey as Sam Landers
- Charles King as Nip Hawkes
- Ed Brady as Tuck Hawkes
- Jack Rockwell as Sheriff
- Clarence Geldart as Dr. Crandall
