= Via Pony Express =

1933 film by Lewis D. Collins

- Lobby card
- Directed by: Lewis D. Collins
- Written by: Oliver Drake; Lewis D. Collins
- Produced by: Henry L. Goldston; Larry Darmour
- Starring: Jack Hoxie; Lane Chandler; Marceline Day
- Cinematography: William Nobles
- Edited by: S. Roy Luby
- Production company: Larry Darmour Productions
- Distributed by: Majestic Pictures
- Release date: February 6, 1933
- Running time: 60 minutes
- Country: United States
- Language: English

Via Pony Express is a 1933 pre-Code American Western film directed by Lewis D. Collins and starring Jack Hoxie, Lane Chandler and Marceline Day.

== Cast ==
- Jack Hoxie as Buck Carson
- Lane Chandler as Lieutenant Bob Grey
- Marceline Day as Betty Castelar
- Matthew Betz as Clem Porter
- Julian Rivero as Pedro
- Doris Hill as June Grey
- Joseph W. Girard as Captain McCarthy
- Charles K. French as Father Estaban
