= Fargo Express =

1933 film

- Directed by: Alan James
- Written by: Earle Snell; Jack Natteford
- Produced by: Samuel Bischoff; Burt Kelly; William Saal; Irving Starr
- Starring: Ken Maynard; Helen Mack; Roy Stewart
- Cinematography: Ted D. McCord
- Edited by: David Berg
- Production company: K.B.S. Productions
- Distributed by: Sono Art-World Wide Pictures
- Release date: November 20, 1933
- Running time: 61 minutes
- Country: United States
- Language: English

Fargo Express is a 1933 American pre-Code Western film directed by Alan James and starring Ken Maynard, Helen Mack and Roy Stewart.

== Cast ==
- Ken Maynard as Ken Benton
- Helen Mack as Helen Clark
- Roy Stewart as Sam Goss
- Paul Fix as Mort Clark
- William Desmond as Sheriff Joe Thompson
- Jack Rockwell as Deputy Slim Stratton
- Claude Payton as Lem - Goss Partner #1
- William Bailey as Goss Partner #2
- Joe Rickson as Lynn - Gambler Who Chases Mort

== Bibliography ==
- Darby, William. Masters of Lens and Light: A Checklist of Major Cinematographers and Their Feature Films. Scarecrow Press, 1991.
