= William Nobles (cinematographer) =

American cinematographer (1892–1968)

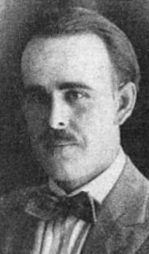
- Born: December 23, 1892; Waubay, South Dakota, US
- Died: November 24, 1968 (aged 75); Costa Mesa, California, US
- Occupation: Cinematographer

William Nobles (December 23, 1892 – November 24, 1968) was an American cinematographer.

== Biography ==
Born in 1892 in Waubay, South Dakota, Nobles worked on nearly 200 Hollywood films in a career that spanned five decades, from 1917 to 1966. His most noted cinematography work is probably the Gene Autry film Red River Valley in 1936, and the original Dick Tracy serial film in 1937, working with Edgar Lyons.

One author described his contribution to filmmaking as follows:

Responsible for Republic's first 20 serials behind the camera was first-rate innovator William Nobles. In collaboration with Edgar Lyons (on the first six) and working solo (for the next fourteen) the former Mascot associate of Nat Levine was one of the best action and Western lensmen in the business. His photographic polish and technique in filming the hectic and furious work of Yak Canutt and company, gained him the reputation of being a major factor in lifting Republic's Westerns and serials far above the quality of its contemporaries, making it the leader in those areas for the next fifteen years.

Another notes the "fine photography" by Nobles in The Fighting Devil Dogs, 1938.

Nobles died in 1968 in Costa Mesa, California, at the age of 75.

== Partial filmography ==
- The Little Patriot (1917)
- Cyclone Bliss (1921)
- Barb Wire (1922)
- The Crow's Nest (1922)
- The Red Warning (1923)
- The White Outlaw (1925)
- Bustin' Thru (1925)
- The Fighting Peacemaker (1926)
- Looking for Trouble (1926)
- A Six Shootin' Romance (1926)
- The Demon (1926)
- The Wild Horse Stampede (1926)
- Red Hot Leather (1926)
- The Border Sheriff (1926)
- The Fighting Three (1927)
- Rough and Ready (1927)
- Overland Bound (1929)
- The Phantom of the Desert (1930)
- Beyond the Rio Grande (1930)
- Firebrand Jordan (1930)
- Westward Bound (1930)
- The Hurricane Horseman (1931)
- Red Fork Range (1931)
- Swanee River (1931)
- Hell's Valley (1931)
- The Cheyenne Cyclone (1931)
- The Law of the Tong (1931)
- West of Cheyenne (1931)
- Law and Lawless (1932)
- The Reckless Rider (1932)
- A Scarlet Week-End (1932)
- Outlaw Justice (1932)
- The Lone Trail (1932)
- The Wyoming Whirlwind (1932)
- Gun Law (1933)
- Trouble Busters (1933)
- Via Pony Express (1933)
- Mystery Mountain (1934)
- The Man from Hell (1934)
- Red River Valley (1936)
- Dick Tracy (1937)
- Bill Cracks Down (1937)
- The Fighting Devil Dogs (1938)
- Heroes of the Saddle (1940)
- Hi-Yo Silver (1940)
