= Come On, Tarzan =

1932 film

- Directed by: Alan James
- Written by: Alan James
- Produced by: E. W. Hammons; Irving Starr
- Starring: Ken Maynard; Merna Kennedy; Niles Welch; Roy Stewart
- Cinematography: Ted McCord
- Edited by: Dave Berg
- Production company: K.B.S. Film Corp.
- Distributed by: World Wide Pictures, Inc.
- Release date: September 11, 1932
- Country: United States

Come On, Tarzan is a 1932 American pre-Code western film starring Ken Maynard, Merna Kennedy, and Niles Welch.

First released on September 11, 1932, it was filmed in California in Hidden Valley, Ventura County and in Kernville, Kern County. It was produced by K.B.S. Productions Inc.

== Plot ==
A ranch foreman at odds with his female boss, fights outlaws who are killing horses for dog food.

== Cast ==
- Ken Maynard as Ken Benson
- Merna Kennedy as Pat Riley
- Niles Welch as Steve Frazier
- Roy Stewart as Butch - Henchman
- Kate Campbell as Aunt Martha
- Bob Kortman as Spike - Henchman
- Nelson McDowell as Slim - Cowhand
- Jack Rockwell as Sheriff
