= Alan James =

American film director (1890–1952)

- Born: March 23, 1890; Port Townsend, Washington, United States
- Died: December 30, 1952 (aged 62); Hollywood, California, United States
- Occupations: Film director Screenwriter
- Years active: 1916-1951

Alan James (March 23, 1890 – December 30, 1952) was an American film director and screenwriter.

He was born in Port Townsend, Washington, as Alan J. Neitz.

He directed more than 70 films between 1916 and 1943. He also wrote for more than 60 films between 1916 and 1951. Many of those films were Westerns.

He died in Hollywood, California.

== Selected filmography ==
- Fighting Back (1917)
- The Boss of the Lazy Y (1917)
- The Medicine Man (1917)
- The Learning of Jim Benton (1917)
- The Crow (1919)
- 3 Gold Coins (1920)
- Crossing Trails (1921)
- Outlawed (1921)
- The Firebrand (1922)
- Back Fire (1922)
- Dangerous Trails (1923)
- The White Panther (1924)
- The Cowboy and the Flapper (1924)
- The Virgin (1924)
- The Reckless Sex (1925)
- Beyond All Odds (1926)
- The Fighting Peacemaker (1926)
- A Six Shootin' Romance (1926)
- Bad Man's Bluff (1926)
- The Demon (1926)
- Hazardous Valley (1927)
- Born to Battle (1927)
- The Sky Rider (1928)
- The Cheer Leader (1928)
- Firebrand Jordan (1930)
- Hell's Valley (1931)
- Trails of Danger (1931)
- Flying Lariats (1931)
- Pueblo Terror (1931)
- Red Fork Range (1931)
- Lariats and Six-Shooters (1931)
- Come On, Tarzan (1932)
- Tex Takes a Holiday (1932)
- King of the Arena (1933)
- Strawberry Roan (1933)
- Fargo Express (1933)
- Swifty (1935)
- Wild Horse Round-Up (1936)
- The Painted Stallion (1937)
- Dick Tracy (1937)
- Land of Fighting Men (1938)
- Flaming Frontiers (1938)
- Call of the Rockies (1938)
- Two Gun Justice (1938)
- Scouts to the Rescue (1939)
- Trigger Smith (1939)
- S.O.S. Coast Guard (1942)
- The Law Rides Again (1943)
- Manhunt of Mystery Island (1945)
