= Wong Chung =

American actor (1880–1963)

- Born: July 17, 1880; San Francisco, California
- Died: July 25, 1963 (aged 83); Los Angeles, California
- Occupation: Film actor

Wong Chung (17 July 1880 - 25 July 1963) was an American film actor. He appeared in Barbary Coast (1935), in which he was the only Asian actor listed in the opening credits, unlike the Asian actors from the period.

== Filmography ==
- The Mysterious Dr. Fu Manchu (1929) as Chinese Official
- Men Without Women (1930) as Chinese Man in Shanghai Bar
- Son of the Gods (1930) as One of Lee Ying's Associates
- Trailing Trouble (1930) as Charlie - Desk Clerk
- Paramount on Parade (1930) as Minor Role
- Road to Paradise (1930) as Waiter
- Outside the Law (1930) as Messenger
- A Holy Terror (1931) as Cook
- Daughter of the Dragon (1931) as Henchman
- The Law of the Tong (1931) as Tong Member
- Shanghai Express (1932) as Chinese Officer Checking Passports
- The Miracle Man (1932) as Chinese Father Who Buys Balloon
- Roar of the Dragon (1932) as Voronsky Henchman
- Tiger Shark (1932) as Chinese Laundryman
- Forbidden Trail (1932) as Wong - Chinese Cook
- Secrets of the French Police (1932) as Chinese Guard
- The Bitter Tea of General Yen (1932) as Chinese Officer
- Frisco Jenny (1932) as Chinese Man
- International House (1933) as Health Inspector
- Double Harness (1933) as Chinese Cook
- Rafter Romance (1933) as Chinese Waiter
- The Bowery (1933) as Irate Chinese Man
- Perils of Pauline (1933) as Chinese Man
- Mandalay (1934) as Chang Lee - the Silk Merchant
- Little Miss Marker (1934) as Chinese Cook
- Fog Over Frisco (1934) as Chinese Cook
- The Cat's-Paw (1934) as Villager
- Eight Bells (1935) as Chinese Man
- Werewolf of London (1935) as Coolie
- Call of the Wild (1935) as Chinese Man in Alley
- Barbary Coast (1935) as Ah Wing
- Frisco Kid (1935) as Chung
- The Leathernecks Have Landed (1936) as Chinese Vendor
- Klondike Annie (1936) as Tong Man
- Daughter of Shanghai (1937) as One of Quan Lin's Servants
- The Little Adventuress (1938) as Chinese Man
- King of Chinatown (1939) as Chinese Man
- Law and Order (1940) as Chinese Man
- They Met in Bombay (1941) as Chinese Merchant
- Burma Convoy (1941) as Chinese Board Member
- None Shall Escape (1944) as Member of Tribunal
- The Lady from Shanghai (1947) as Li
- Smuggler's Island (1951) as Chinese Man on Wharf
- The Seventh Sin (1957) as Elderly Chinese Man
