= Christian Rub =

Austrian-American actor (1886–1956)

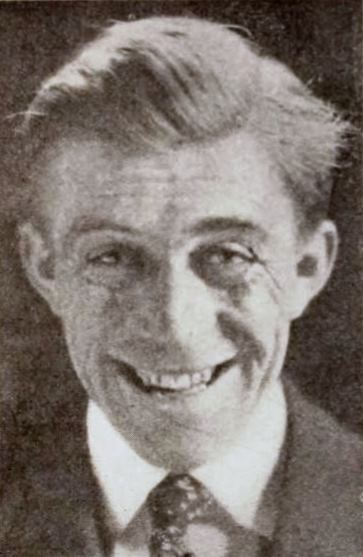
- 1920 magazine
- Born: April 13, 1886; Graz, Austria-Hungary
- Died: April 14, 1956 (aged 70); Santa Barbara, California, U.S.
- Occupation: Actor
- Years active: 1919–1952

Christian Rub (pronounced Rhoob; April 13, 1886 – April 14, 1956) was an Austrian-born American character actor. He was known for his work in films of the late 1910s to the early 1950s, and was featured in more than 100 films.

== Biography ==
Rub's parents, Otto and Paula, were an actor and a "stage beauty", respectively. His sister, Marianne, performed on radio. Rub was born in Graz, in Austria-Hungary.

Rub became a comedian as a boy in Germany. When he was 15, he performed in a French drama in Vienna at the Imperial theater. Two years later, he was in the Tyrolean Alps with a company, "playing everything from very ancient grandpas to very young lovers." He also played Ernest Rodel in Spring Awakening.

He starred in two-reel comedies in Hollywood in the early 1920s. His first appearance was in the 1919 movie The Belle of New York. He ventured into drama on stage with a role in a production of Grand Hotel in Los Angeles in the early 1930s.

Rub provided the voice of Geppetto in the 1940 animated Disney film Pinocchio, as well as voices of kindly old men for MGM, Fox and Warner Bros. cartoons. Rub was not the original voice for Geppetto. He replaced the first actor, whose voice Walt Disney considered to be too harsh.

During the creation of Pinocchio, Rub was notorious amongst the film's animators for his open and frequent expressions of admiration for Adolf Hitler.

Rub's last movie role was in 1952's Something for the Birds. He died in Santa Barbara, California one day after his 70th birthday.

== Partial filmography ==
- The Belle of New York (1919) – (film debut)
- The Trial of Vivienne Ware (1932) – Axel Nordstrom
- The Man from Yesterday (1932) – Swiss Terrace Waiter
- Those We Love (1932) – (uncredited)
- The Crooked Circle (1932) – Old Dan
- Le bluffeur (1932) – Dr. Rudolph Pfeiffer – Inventor
- Silver Dollar (1932) – Rische
- Secrets of the French Police (1932) – Anton Dorain
- No Other Woman (1933) – Eli Bogavitch
- The Billion Dollar Scandal (1933) – Locksmith Convict (uncredited)
- Luxury Liner (1933) – Peasant Father
- Humanity (1933) – Schmiddy
- The Mind Reader (1933) – Printer (uncredited)
- The Kiss Before the Mirror (1933) – Man on the Wrong Floor
- Mary Stevens, M.D. (1933) – Gus – Mary's Janitor
- Tugboat Annie (1933) – Sailor (uncredited)
- Bureau of Missing Persons (1933) – Apartment House Custodian (uncredited)
- A Man of Sentiment (1933) – Herman Heupelkossel
- Man of Two Worlds (1934) – Knudson
- The Cat and the Fiddle (1934) – Innkeeper (uncredited)
- No More Women (1934) – Big Pants
- No Greater Glory (1934) – Watchman
- Private Scandal (1934) – August – First Customer (uncredited)
- Little Man, What Now? (1934) – Herr Puttbreese
- Stamboul Quest (1934) – Dr. Joachim Leder (uncredited)
- Romance in the Rain (1934) – Slotnick
- The Fountain (1934) – Kerstholt
- No Ransom (1934) – Budge (uncredited)
- I Am a Thief (1934) – Train Station Attendant (uncredited)
- Music in the Air (1934) – Zipfelhuber
- The Mighty Barnum (1934) – Bit Part (uncredited)
- The Night Is Young (1935) – Cafe Proprietor (uncredited)
- Romance in Manhattan (1935) – Otto – an Immigrant (uncredited)
- Maybe It's Love (1935) – Ole – the Janitor (uncredited)
- One More Spring (1935) – Man with glasses in elevator (uncredited)
- A Dog of Flanders (1935) – Hans
- Black Fury (1935) – Hospitalized Miner (uncredited)
- Stolen Harmony (1935) – Mathew Huxley (uncredited)
- Mark of the Vampire (1935) – Deaf Man at Inquest (uncredited)
- Age of Indiscretion (1935) – Briggs (uncredited)
- Let 'Em Have It (1935) – Henkel
- Oil for the Lamps of China (1935) – Dr. Jorgen
- Ladies Crave Excitement (1935) – Lars Swenson
- Metropolitan (1935) – Weidel
- Peter Ibbetson (1935) – Maj. Duquesnois
- The Man Who Broke the Bank at Monte Carlo (1935) – Gallard's Guide (uncredited)
- We're Only Human (1935) – William Anderson
- Hitch Hike Lady (1935) – Farmer
- Tough Guy (1936) – Cap (uncredited)
- Next Time We Love (1936) – Otto—Innkeeper (uncredited)
- The Leathernecks Have Landed (1936) – Schooner Captain
- Till We Meet Again (1936) – Old Conductor (uncredited)
- Mr. Deeds Goes to Town (1936) – Christian Jenson (uncredited)
- Murder on a Bridle Path (1936) – Chris Thomas
- Dracula's Daughter (1936) – Coachman (uncredited)
- The Princess Comes Across (1936) – Gustavson (uncredited)
- Fury (1936) – Sven Ahern – Barber (uncredited)
- Parole! (1936) – John – Jury Foreman (uncredited)
- Sins of Man (1936) – Fritz
- Suzy (1936) – 'Pop' Gaspard
- Girls' Dormitory (1936) – Forester
- Star for a Night (1936) – Postmaster (uncredited)
- The Devil Is a Sissy (1936) – Tombstone Mason (uncredited)
- Murder with Pictures (1936) – Olaf (uncredited)
- Love on the Run (1936) – Stephen (uncredited)
- Outcast (1937) – Olaf – the Valet
- Maytime (1937) – Sleeper Outside Cafe (uncredited)
- When Love Is Young (1937) – Anton Werner
- Thin Ice (1937) – Minister (scenes deleted)
- Café Metropole (1937) – Maxl Schinner
- Captains Courageous (1937) – Old Clement (uncredited)
- It Could Happen to You (1937) – Clavish
- One Hundred Men and a Girl (1937) – Brandstetter
- Heidi (1937) – Baker
- Prescription for Romance (1937) – Conductor
- Tovarich (1937) – Trombone Player (uncredited)
- Mad About Music (1938) – Pierre
- Professor Beware (1938) – Gustave – Museum Attendant (uncredited)
- I'll Give a Million (1938) – Commissionaire
- You Can't Take It with You (1938) – Mr. Schmidt
- The Great Waltz (1938) – Coachman
- Never Say Die (1939) – The Mayor
- Forged Passport (1939) – Mr. Nelson
- Hidden Power (1939) – Doctor
- No Place to Go (1939) – Otto Schlemmer
- Everything Happens at Night (1939) – Telegrapher
- Pinocchio (1940) – Geppetto (voice, uncredited)
- Swiss Family Robinson (1940) – Thoren
- Ski Patrol (1940) – Jakob Sorenson, old villager
- Earthbound (1940) – Etienne Almette
- Four Sons (1940) – Kapek
- All This, and Heaven Too (1940) – Loti (uncredited)
- Haunted House (1940) – Olaf Jensen
- Rhythm on the River (1940) – Pawnbroker (uncredited)
- Father's Son (1941) – Lunk Nelson
- Henry Aldrich for President (1941) – Janitor (uncredited)
- Dangerously They Live (1941) – Steiner
- Nazi Agent (1942) – Mohr (uncredited)
- It Happened in Flatbush (1942) – Pop Schlumbom (uncredited)
- Tales of Manhattan (1942) – Cello Player (Laughton sequence)
- Berlin Correspondent (1942) – Prisoner
- Chetniks! The Fighting Guerrillas (1943) – Tailor (uncredited)
- The Leather Burners (1943) – Sooky Withers (uncredited)
- Bomber's Moon (1943) – Johann
- Princess O'Rourke (1943) – Janitor (uncredited)
- The Adventures of Mark Twain (1944) – Jones (uncredited)
- Once Upon a Time (1944) – Mr. Snapps – Janitor (uncredited)
- Jungle Woman (1944) – George – Groundsman
- Three Is a Family (1944) – Bellboy
- Rhapsody in Blue (1945) – Swedish Janitor (uncredited)
- Strange Confession (1945) – Mr. Moore
- Fall Guy (1947) – Swede
- Something for the Birds (1952) – Leo Fischer (final film role)
