= Barbary Coast (film) =

1935 film

- 1935 Theatrical Poster
- Directed by: Howard Hawks
- Written by: Ben Hecht; Charles MacArthur
- Produced by: Samuel Goldwyn
- Starring: Miriam Hopkins; Edward G. Robinson; Joel McCrea; Frank Craven
- Cinematography: Ray June
- Edited by: Edward Curtiss
- Music by: Alfred Newman
- Production company: Samuel Goldwyn Productions
- Distributed by: United Artists
- Release date: October 13, 1935
- Running time: 90 minutes
- Country: United States
- Language: English
- Budget: $1 million

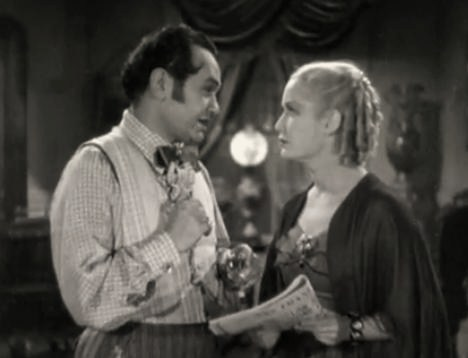
Edward G. Robinson and Miriam Hopkins

Barbary Coast is a 1935 American historical Western film directed by Howard Hawks. Shot in black-and-white and set in San Francisco's so-called Barbary Coast during the California Gold Rush, the film combines elements of the Western genre with those of crime, melodrama and adventure. It features a wide range of actors, from hero Joel McCrea to villain Edward G. Robinson, and stars Miriam Hopkins in the leading role as Mary 'Swan' Rutledge. In an early, uncredited appearance, David Niven plays a drunken sailor being thrown out of a bar.

== Plot ==
On a foggy night in 1850, Mary Rutledge and retired Colonel Marcus Aurelius Cobb arrive in San Francisco Bay aboard the clipper ship Flying Cloud. She had come to wed a wealthy owner of a gold mine, but he had lost his mine at the roulette wheel when the ball landed on red 13 times at the Bella Donna, a gambling house and restaurant. The men at the wharf reluctantly inform her that her fiancé is dead, murdered most likely by Louis Chamalis, the powerful owner of the Bella Donna. Mary is upset, but quickly pulls herself together.

Mary meets Chamalis and goes to work for him. Chamalis gives her the name "Swan" and showers her with extravagant gifts. Their relationship sours quickly because Swan is angered by Chamalis's destructive power-mongering. She does not, however, mind running a crooked roulette wheel and cheating the miners out of their gold.

Colonel Cobb purchases a printing press, with the intention of starting a respectable newspaper for the people of San Francisco. His first issue includes an article criticizing an unpunished murder by Chamalis and his men. When Chamalis finds out, he threatens to destroy Cobb's printing press and burn down the building, but is halted by Swan. Chamalis demands that Cobb never print anything attacking him. The colonel unwillingly complies.

Swan becomes disillusioned with her life in San Francisco. Her distant behavior irks Chamalis. One morning, she sets out on horseback. When it begins to rain heavily, she seeks refuge in a seemingly abandoned cabin, where she meets poet and gold miner Jim Carmichael. Swan is taken with him, but lies about her current situation after hearing his criticisms of the city. He gives her his book of poems as a memento.

Carmichael decides to return to New York. Because of fog, the ship will not leave for a few days. He meets Chamalis's helper, Old Atrocity, who, seeing his bags of gold is happy to show him to the Bella Donna. Carmichael is surprised to find Mary working there. He is served drugged liquor and plays roulette at her table. He loses his composure, insults Swan and eventually loses his money.

Carmichael wakes the following morning in the Bella Donna's kitchen. His eloquent speech impresses Chamalis, who hires him on the spot as a waiter. Carmichael's presence bothers Mary, who offers him money to depart. Carmichael refuses, wishing to earn the fare on his own.

Cobb puts up a poster telling about a murder Chamalis ordered and how the Bella Donna cheats customers. Seeing it, Chamalis's henchman "Knuckles" Jacoby shoots both the man who put it up and the publisher when he tries to defend him. Dying, Cobb orders his assistant to print the truth. Vigilantes hang Knuckles.

Devastated by Cobb's death, Mary acknowledges her love for Carmichael, and works the roulette table so that he wins back the gold he lost. Chamalis finds out and sets out to kill Carmichael. The lovers decide to leave together. They find a rowboat and attempt to board the ship in the harbor. They have trouble seeing in the fog, but can hear Chamalis pursuing them. He shoots and injures Carmichael, and corners them beneath a pier. Mary begs him, as proof of his love for her, not to kill Carmichael. Chamalis agrees, but tells her he does not want her anymore. The sheriff arrives with a mob, and Chamalis allows himself to be taken away. Mary returns to Carmichael's side aboard the ship as it prepares to set sail.

== Cast ==
- Miriam Hopkins as Mary "Swan" Rutledge
- Edward G. Robinson as Luis Chamalis
- Joel McCrea as Jim Carmichael
- Frank Craven as Colonel Cobb
- Walter Brennan as Old Atrocity
- Brian Donlevy as Knuckles Jacoby
- Clyde Cook as Oakie
- Harry Carey as Jed Slocum
- Matt McHugh as Broncho
- Donald Meek as Sawbuck McTavish
- J.M. Kerrigan as Judge Harper
- David Niven as Drunken Sailor
- Rollo Lloyd as Wigham
- Heinie Conklin as Gambler (uncredited)
- Wong Chung as Ah Wing (uncredited)
- Harry Tenbrook as Henchman (uncredited)
- Harry Holman as Mayor of San Francisco (uncredited)
- Hank Mann as Waiter (uncredited)

== Production ==
The film is based on the bestseller The Barbary Coast (1933) by Herbert Asbury. When the first draft of the script was submitted to Joseph Breen, he commented to Samuel Goldwyn that "The whole flavor of the story is one of sordidness, and low-tone morality."

After months of revisions by Ben Hecht and Charles MacArthur, the story changed from a story of an area of San Francisco where men came to find pleasure in drinking, prostitution, and gambling to a love story. Breen commented to Will Hays that it was now a love story "between a fine, clean girl" and a sentimental young man and that there was "no sex, no unpleasant details of prostitution" and contains "full, and completely compensating, value [...] the finest and most intelligent picture I have seen in many months".

== Reception ==
Writing for The Spectator in 1935, Graham Greene declared the film a triumphant success, describing it as "melodrama of the neatest, most expert kind, well directed, well acted and well written". Despite the film's use of what Greene regarded as a conventional plot, he lauded the "fresh and interesting" use of flawed characters to "make something real out of the hocus-pocus".

Andre Sennwald of the The New York Times described the film as "a bouncing melodrama of San Francisco's sin and salad days" and credited the writers, Ben Hecht and Charles MacArthur, for "a jovial virility that makes it one of the show pieces of the season. Their dialogue has the wit, the gaudy sentiment and the exuberance of a tipsy poet."

Variety applauded the "fine photography" of Ray June and the overall "production excellence", commenting that "the atmosphere of the period is richly caught." While complimenting the performances, it declared that it was Miriam Hopkins' picture, although Edward G. Robinson and Joel McCrea were described as "strong".

Modern Screen gave the film a four-star review and said that it was "produced with the skill and good taste which have accompanied most of Sam Goldwyn's recent pictures". The acting was also praised; Hopkins was credited as having given "one of her best performances", and Robinson was described as "perfect". The review ended with "you'll be surprised at the excellent performance by Joel McCrea, and you'll welcome a new comedian named Walter Brennan, who'll have you in stitches".

Scholastic, a magazine for youth recommended the film for its "authentic background and characters of the days of gold-discovery", and Canadian Magazine assured Canadians that the film had "nothing to do with the cheap, tawdry 'coast' " from the novel.

Among those who provided negative reviews were Time, who wrote that it was "painfully uninspired", and Newsweek who complained that the plot from the original book was thrown away.

The Chicago Legion of Decency condemned Barbary Coast, and there were calls for the film to be banned in Chicago. Goldwyn edited a few scenes, and the film was allowed to be exhibited there. The Bishop of Los Angeles, John Cantwell, saw the movie with four other priests and enjoyed it; none found it immoral.

== Accolades ==
Ray June was nominated for the Academy Award for Best Cinematography.
