= Kentucky Jones =

American comedy-drama television series

- Genre: Comedy drama
- Starring: Dennis Weaver; Harry Morgan; Rickey Der
- Theme music composer: Vic Mizzy
- Country of origin: United States
- Original language: English
- No. of seasons: 1
- No. of episodes: 26

Production
- Executive producer: Buzz Kulik
- Running time: 30 minutes

Original release
- Network: NBC
- Release: September 19, 1964 – April 10, 1965

Kentucky Jones is an American comedy-drama television series starring Dennis Weaver which centers around a widowed Southern California veterinarian and rancher raising an adopted Chinese boy. Original episodes aired from September 19, 1964, until April 10, 1965.

== Cast ==
- Dennis Weaver....Kenneth Yarborough "Kentucky" Jones
- Rickey Der....Dwight Eisenhower "Ike" Wong
- Harry Morgan....Seldom Jackson
- Keye Luke....Thomas Wong
- Cherylene Lee....Annie Ng
- Arthur Wong....Mr. Ng
- Nancy Rennick....Edith Thorncroft

== Synopsis ==
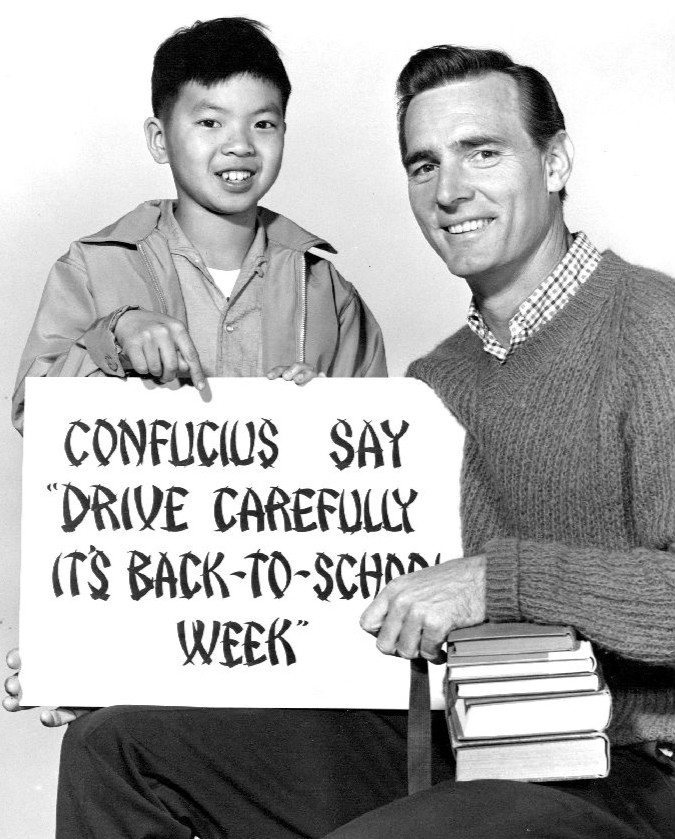
Rickey Der and Dennis Weaver in a promotional photograph for Kentucky Jones.

Dr. Kenneth Yarborough Jones is a veterinarian and former horse trainer in Southern California who owns a 40-acre (16 ha) horse ranch. He has the nickname "Kentucky" because his signature is "K.Y. Jones," "KY" is the postal abbreviation for Kentucky, and "Kenneth" and "Kentucky" share the same first syllable. His wife had started the process for the couple to adopt and raise an orphaned nine-year-old — or 10-year-old, according to some sources — Chinese boy, but when she dies suddenly, Kentucky tries to stop the adoption process. He is too late, however, and the boy — named Dwight Eisenhower Wong and nicknamed "Ike," like former general and President Dwight Eisenhower — becomes his adopted son. Unexpectedly facing the challenge of raising Ike as a single father while continuing his veterinary practice and running his ranch, Kentucky is reluctant to bring Ike into his busy life at first, but he comes to love Ike. Helping him are his handyman, former jockey Seldom Jackson, as well as members of the local Chinese-American community. Edith Thorncroft is a social worker who visits to look in on Kentucky and Ike and check on Ike's welfare. Annie Ng is Ike's friend, and Mr. Ng is Annie's father.

== Production ==
After nine seasons portraying Deputy Chester Goode on Gunsmoke, Dennis Weaver left Gunsmoke for Kentucky Jones. It was Weaver's first starring role.

Kentucky Jones originally was produced without a laugh track, but after NBC threatened to cancel the show if it had no laugh track, its producers unwillingly added one.

Buzz Kulik created and produced Kentucky Jones. Vic Mizzy wrote the show's theme music.

== Critical reception ==
A review published in The New York Times on September 21, 1964, described Dennis Weaver as "not a performer of very extensive versatility," adding that in the role of Kentucky Jones he did "not [bring] much range of feeling or involvement." It credited Ricky Der with a sometimes-winning portrayal of Ike, but characterized Kentucky Jones as "mechanically constructed and far from well written," and the character of Ike as "exceptionally precocious."

== Broadcast history ==
Kentucky Jones premiered on September 19, 1964, and aired on Saturdays at 8:30 p.m. through December 27, 1964. It moved to 8:00 p.m. on Saturdays — exchanging time slots with The Famous Adventures of Mr Magoo, which moved to 8:30 p.m. — on January 2, 1965, and remained there for the rest of its run. NBC cancelled it after only one season, and its last original episode aired on April 10, 1965.

NBC rebroadcast 22 of the 26 episodes of Kentucky Jones as prime-time reruns in the show's regular time slot at 8:00 p.m. on Saturdays beginning on April 17, 1965, a week after it aired the last new episode. The last prime-time rerun aired on September 11, 1965. The following week, I Dream of Jeannie replaced Kentucky Jones in its time slot.

== Home media ==
A three-disc boxed set of Kentucky Jones dubbed in German was released on Region 2 DVD on March 3, 2017. Twenty-one episodes of Kentucky Jones (episodes 1–8, 10–12, 14–16, 18–20, 22–24, and 26) dubbed in German were broadcast in West Germany beginning in September 1964, and the set includes them. The wording of reviews and promotional announcements does not make clear whether the other five episodes (9, 13, 17, 21, and 25), which were not dubbed in German, also are included in the DVD set, but implies that they are. The DVD set has no subtitle options, but includes the original trailer for the series, a short "trailer show," and a multi-page booklet with information about the show.

== Episodes ==
No.	Title	Directed by	Written by	Original release date
1	"Hello, Ike"	Unknown	Unknown	September 19, 1964
The pilot for the series. After the sudden death of his wife, Kentucky tries to back out of adopting the Chinese boy the couple had planned to raise, but he gets a call informing him that the boy is waiting for him at the airport. Diane Brewster, Marlyn Mason, and Emlen Davies guest-star.
2	"First Day"	Unknown	Unknown	September 26, 1964
Kentucky spends all night attending to a foaling mare, and does not get home until dawn — and then Seldom informs him that he has to register Ike for elementary school that day. Dee J. Thompson, Jill Andre, and Sam Reese guest-star.
3	"Spare the Rod"	Unknown	Unknown	October 3, 1964
Ike's first love is a girl he secretly admires in his Sunday school class — but Kentucky does not get along at all with the girl's father, whose laundry is putting too much starch in his shirts. Paul Fix and Jane Chang guest-star.
4	"Mail Order Bride"	Unknown	Unknown	October 10, 1964
Saddened by Kentucky's grief over the loss of his wife, Ike contacts a matchmaker — Mrs. Tea-Store Fu, known as the best marriage broker in Chinatown — for help in finding a romantic partner for Kentucky. Beulah Quo, June Kim, and James Hong guest-star.
5	"Pony Boy"	Unknown	Unknown	October 17, 1964
Edith becomes concerned about Ike's welfare when he gets thrown from a pony at Kentucky′s ranch and because Kentucky is spending time with an attractive woman of whom Edith disapproves. Warrene Ott guest-stars.
6	"Wildcat Soup"	Unknown	Unknown	November 7, 1964
Once known for having a quick temper, Kentucky is being careful with his behavior so that he will not lose custody of Ike — which means he has to control his temper when his hot-rodding neighbor Chub Baxter gets on his nerves. James Dawson, Lloyd Gough, and Tyler McVey guest-star.
7	"Ike's Song"	Unknown	Unknown	November 14, 1964
Also entitled "Ike's Tong." Ike gets concerned when he finds out that two race-track touts Kentucky knows have plans that will make them a lot of money by fixing an upcoming horse race at Santa Anita Park. Pat Harrington Jr., Emile Mayer, Allen Jung, and Harold Fong guest-star.
8	"The Sour Note"	Unknown	Unknown	November 21, 1964
Ike is denied an opportunity to sing "The Star-Spangled Banner" at an upcoming school function because of his off-key singing, and Kentucky is called in to Ike's school to discuss his singing ability. Leslie Parrish and Lee Bergere guest-star.
9	"Goodbye Tiger"	Unknown	Unknown	November 28, 1964
Ike is injured in a serious fall, and while he is recuperating in bed he overhears one of Kentucky's conversations outside his room — and it convinces him that he is going to die.
10	"The Dread Disease"	Unknown	Unknown	December 5, 1964
Seldom's ex-wife pays a surprise visit to the ranch — much to his dismay. Carole Cook, H. T. Tsiang, Joan Lemmo, Joseph Ruskin, Jack Catron, and Loren Jones guest-star.
11	"Ho, Ho, Ho"	Unknown	Unknown	December 19, 1964
As Ike's first Christmas approaches, Kentucky is annoyed by everyone reminding him to make sure it is memorable for Ike.
12	"Midsummer Madness"	Unknown	Unknown	December 26, 1964
Ike is excited when he gets picked to star in his school's stage production of A Midsummer Night's Dream, but then he is upset that it means he has to kiss a girl. Sarah Marshall, Dee J. Thompson, Sam Reese, Maura McEveety, Lee Krieger, and Arlen Stuart guest-star.
13	"Motherhood"	Unknown	Unknown	January 2, 1965
When Ike brings home an abandoned teenage girl who has no money and her mare, which is in foal, Kentucky sees it as an opportunity to explain sex to Ike. Lew Brown, John Newton, Barbara Collentine, Pepper Curtis, and Regina Groves guest-star.
14	"My Old Kwangtungy Home"	Unknown	Unknown	January 9, 1965
Alternately titled "My Kwangtungy Home." Ike′s homesickness for his former life in China gets worse when Kentucky has to go on a trip without him. Guy Wilkerson, Erin O'Brien-Moore, and Bryon Morrow guest-star.
15	"The Big Shot"	Unknown	Unknown	January 16, 1965
Seldom tries to impress a woman he has met by telling her he owns the ranch. After he confesses his lie to Kentucky and Ike, they decide to play along with his story. Virginia Vincent, Harry Townes, and Gilbert Green guest-star.
16	"The Music Kids Make"	Unknown	Unknown	January 30, 1965
Both Ike and another boy, his friend Paulie Clifton (portrayed by Dennis Weaver's son, Robby Weaver), want to buy the same guitar at a pawn shop, but neither of them has enough money for it. Philip Abbott, Robby Weaver, Ned Glass, and James Chandler guest-star.
17	"The Return of Wong Lee"	Unknown	Unknown	February 6, 1965
Ike believes that his ancient ancestor Wong Lee is visiting him in the form of a goat that Seldom purchased at an auction. Richard Bull and Malcolm Atterbury guest-star.
18	"Two Ends of a Stick"	Unknown	Unknown	February 13, 1965
Kentucky decides to train a friend's horse prior to an upcoming high-stakes race. Nancy Gates guest-stars.
19	"The Big Speech"	Unknown	Unknown	February 20, 1965
Ike is disappointed and hurt when Kentucky is so focused on a research project that he neglects to congratulate and praise Ike for bringing home a straight-A report card from school. Charles Lane and Jane Chang guest-star.
20	"Senior Citizen"	Unknown	Unknown	February 27, 1965
In accordance with Chinese custom, Ike wants to honor and respect Kentucky's elderly but lively Uncle Henry as the Jones family patriarch. Harry Harvey Sr., Tommy Lee, and Elizabeth Shaw guest-star.
21	"Bad Penny"	Unknown	Unknown	March 6, 1965
Ned Scratch — a chronic gambler on horse races who has bad luck — notices that Ike has a knack for predicting which horse will win a race. Joe Maross, Len Lesser, Jess Kirkpatrick, and Howard Dayton guest-star.
22	"Feminine Intrusion"	Unknown	Unknown	March 13, 1965
Kentucky allows Mrs. Jolly to pay her veterinary bill by working it off as the Jones family′s cook. Spring Byington, Frank Wilcox, and Mark Chappie guest-star.
23	"Most Precious Gold"	Unknown	Unknown	March 20, 1965
Ike is excited when Kentucky finds the time to take him camping. Strother Martin and William Bramley guest-star.
24	"Laughing Buddha"	Unknown	Unknown	March 27, 1965
Ike buys a small statuette of a laughing Buddha, considered a good-luck piece, because it reminds him of his former home in China — but when a collector offers him twice as much as he paid for it, he is not sure if should keep it. Reginald Owen, Clarke Gordon, and Gerald Jann guest-star.
25	"The Victim"	Unknown	Unknown	April 3, 1965
After Kentucky and Seldom agree that it would be nice if Ike could reunite with his mother, Kentucky makes an arrangement with a man who claims that he can find her in China and transport her to the United States. Lisa Lu, George Macready, Ralph Montgomery, Richard Bull, and Howard Van guest-star.
26	"Kentucky′s Vacation"	Unknown	Unknown	April 10, 1965
Kentucky says that he is worn out by a lot of little things that have gone wrong and that he needs a vacation, but he does not get the break he expected when Mrs. Edgerton asks him to take her dog to a dog show in New York City. Yvonne Craig, Eleanor Audley, Ed Peck, Joseph Mell, Frederic Downs, and Eve Bruce guest-star.
