= Something for the Birds =

1952 film by Robert Wise

- Directed by: Robert Wise
- Written by: I. A. L. Diamond
- Story by: Alvin Josephy; Joseph Petracca; Boris Ingster
- Produced by: Samuel G. Engel
- Starring: Victor Mature; Patricia Neal; Edmund Gwenn
- Cinematography: Joseph LaShelle
- Edited by: Hugh S. Fowler
- Music by: Sol Kaplan
- Production company: 20th Century Fox
- Distributed by: 20th Century Fox
- Release date: November 14, 1952
- Running time: 81 minutes
- Country: United States
- Language: English

Something for the Birds is a 1952 American comedy film directed by Robert Wise and starring Victor Mature, Patricia Neal and Edmund Gwenn.

== Plot ==
Johnnie Adams, an engraver in Washington, uses some of the invitations his firm makes to crash Washington parties. He gets to be called "Admiral", and is accepted as part of the social group.

Johnnie meets Anne Richards, who's interested in preventing a gas company from drilling on certain west coast lands, which would destroy the breeding grounds of some California condors.

She enlists Johnnie's aid, and he asks Steve Bennett, a lobbyist, for help. However, unknown to him, Bennett's company is also employed to lobby Congress to develop the land: and he's the one they've chosen.

When an investigating committee gets on the job, Johnnie's actual position is exposed, and he comes in for national publicity.

This makes it possible for the bird sanctuary to be saved, and Johnnie gets his job back, with a promotion. Steve, who has had a falling out with Anne, finds himself invited to his own wedding, by Anne, to her: she had Johnnie print the invitations: smiling, he puts one in his pocket.

== Cast ==
- Victor Mature as Steve Bennett
- Patricia Neal as Anne Richards
- Edmund Gwenn as Admiral Johnnie Adams
- Larry Keating as Roy Patterson
- Gladys Hurlbut as Della Rice
- Hugh Sanders as Jim Grady
- Christian Rub as Leo Fischer
- Wilton Graff as Taylor
- Ian Wolfe as Foster
- Madge Blake as Mrs. J.L.Chadwick
- Archer MacDonald as T.Courtney Lemmer
- Richard Garrick as Chandler
- Russell Gaige as Winthrop
- John Brown as Mr. Lund
- Camillo Guercio as Duncan
- Joan Miller as Mac
- Norman Field as Judge
- Gordon Nelson as Senator O'Malley
- Emmett Vogan as Senator Beecham
- John Ayres as Congressman Walker
- Charles Watts as Jessup
- Norma Varden as Congresswoman Bates
- John Maxwell as Congressman Craig
- Louise Lorimer as Mrs. Winthrop

== Production ==
The film was based on an original story by Joseph Petracca and Alvin Josephy about the romance between an environmentalist and a lobbyist. It was purchased by 20th Century Fox in October 1950 and assigned to producer Sam Engel. Boris Ingster wrote the script. The original stars were Anne Baxter (environmentalist), Paul Douglas (lobbyist) and Victor Moore (admiral). However, Douglas dropped out when his contract with Fox terminated, and he was replaced by Dana Andrews.

The film took some months to go into production. By April 1952, Baxter had dropped out and Jeanne Crain was to star. But Crain had just given birth and could not get medical clearance to make the movie so Patricia Neal was cast instead. The male romantic lead was given to Victor Mature, who was meant to be in The Farmer Takes a Wife for Fox but was reassigned. At this stage the title had been changed to Old Sailors Never Die. The other lead role was given to Edmund Gwenn, who played a counterfeiter for Fox in Mister 880.

I.A.L. Diamond was bought in to rewrite the script.

Filming started May 1952. The cast included Christian Rub, making his first film in five years.

"It's a nice script", said Neal. "I've appeared in comedies before but this is my first real comedy role."

== Reception ==
Producer Julius Blaustein liked Mature and Neal so much he bought an original story from Francis Cockerell, The Desert, to reteam them but it was never made.
