= Mr. Wu (1927 film) =

1927 film by William Nigh

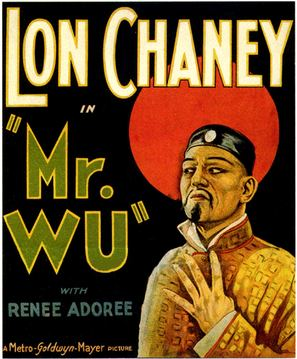
- Film poster
- Directed by: William Nigh
- Based on: The play Mr. Wu by: Henry Maurice Vernon; Harold Owen
- Starring: Lon Chaney; Renée Adorée
- Cinematography: John Arnold
- Edited by: Ben Lewis
- Music by: Louis F. Gottschal
- Production company: Metro-Goldwyn-Mayer Corp.
- Distributed by: Metro-Goldwyn-Mayer Corp.
- Release date: March 26, 1927
- Running time: 80 minutes
- Country: United States
- Language: Silent (English intertitles)

Mr. Wu is a 1927 American silent drama film directed by William Nigh and starring Lon Chaney, based on a 1913 stage play. Chaney portrays a Chinese patriarch who tries to exact revenge on the Englishman who seduced his daughter.

== Plot ==
Mr. Wu (1927)

In the prologue, Chaney plays Grandfather Wu, entrusting his grandson's education to a trusted English associate, stating "The West is coming to the East. He [my heir] must be prepared for both." Chaney also plays the part of the grandson as a young man who enters an arranged marriage with a delicate girl who dies after giving birth to a daughter. Wu swears he will raise the child as a daughter and a son.

As Mr. Wu's daughter, Nang Ping, emerges into womanhood, he arranges a marriage for her with a mandarin. A lively, spirited girl, she has been educated by her father's old tutor. Despite the seclusion of her father's palace, she meets and falls in love with Basil Gregory, a young Englishman. His father is a diplomat who does not respect Chinese ways and insults the "damned Chinks" to their faces, although the rest of his family is courteous.

Basil later informs Nang Ping that he must return to Britain with his family. However, she surprises him with the revelation that she carries his child. Later, Basil indicates he indeed wants to marry her, but she then claims she was merely trying to establish if he was an "honorable man", and reveals she is already engaged in an arranged marriage. Via a nosy gardener, Nang Ping's father discovers the relationship.

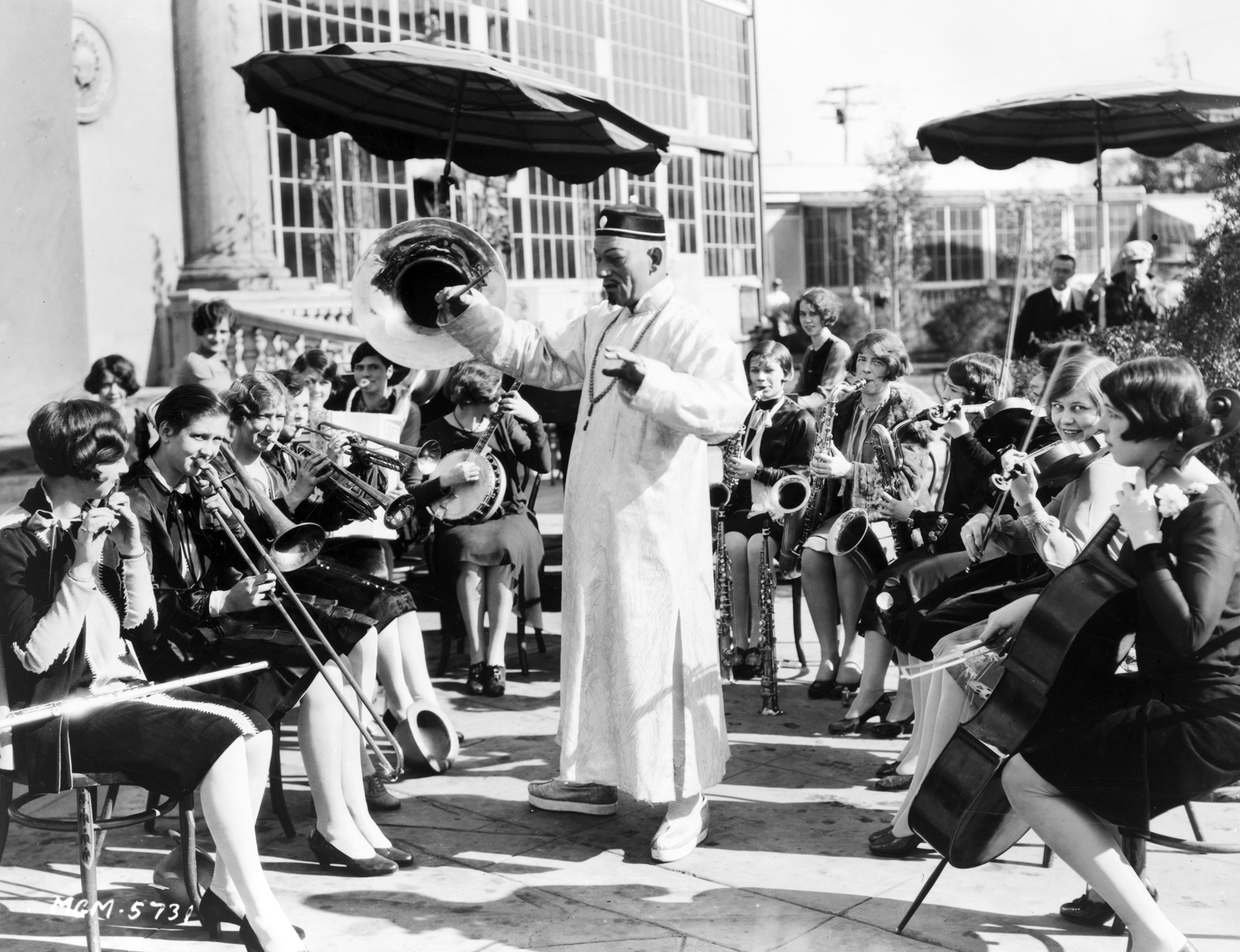
Lon Chaney as Mr. Wu, conducting an orchestra of women.

While Wu agonizingly peruses his culture's ancient writings, he concludes that a dishonored daughter must "die by the hand of her father." Despite his great tenderness and love for her, he interprets customary Chinese law as grimly necessitating Nang Ping's execution. Father and daughter bid each other a tearful goodbye. She asks him to spare her lover, indicating that would make death less painful and less meaningless for her. She then obediently retreats to the home's central shrine. The last scene of that act concludes as the curtain dramatically drops over the profile of Wu lifting his sword high above his daughter's prostrate form.

Wu then goes about exacting revenge on the Gregory family, whom he feels is responsible for the "dishonor" and subsequent death of his daughter. He invites Mrs. Gregory and her daughter to his home and tricks the daughter into going into Nang Ping's room, immediately locking her in, imprisoning her on the room's raised outdoor terrace. He has Basil tied up in an adjacent garden, flanked by an axe-wielding servant. By sunset, Mrs. Gregory has the choice of either condemning her son to death or her daughter to prostitution. She says there is another way and offers her own life. Wu explains that this is not the custom in China; the parents are obliged to live on and bear the shame. Nonetheless, Mrs. Gregory continues to insist Wu take her life instead of those of her children, and in an ensuing struggle, Mrs. Gregory stabs Wu with a knife from a nearby desk, thus freeing herself, and ultimately, her daughter and Basil. Wu staggers to strike the gong to signal that Basil should be killed anyway, but a vision of Nang Ping appears, shaking her head and imploring her father with outstretched arms. Pursuing the ghostly image into the hall, Wu dies and is found by his old friend and tutor, who picks up Wu's prayer beads and says "Thus passes the House of Wu."

== Cast ==
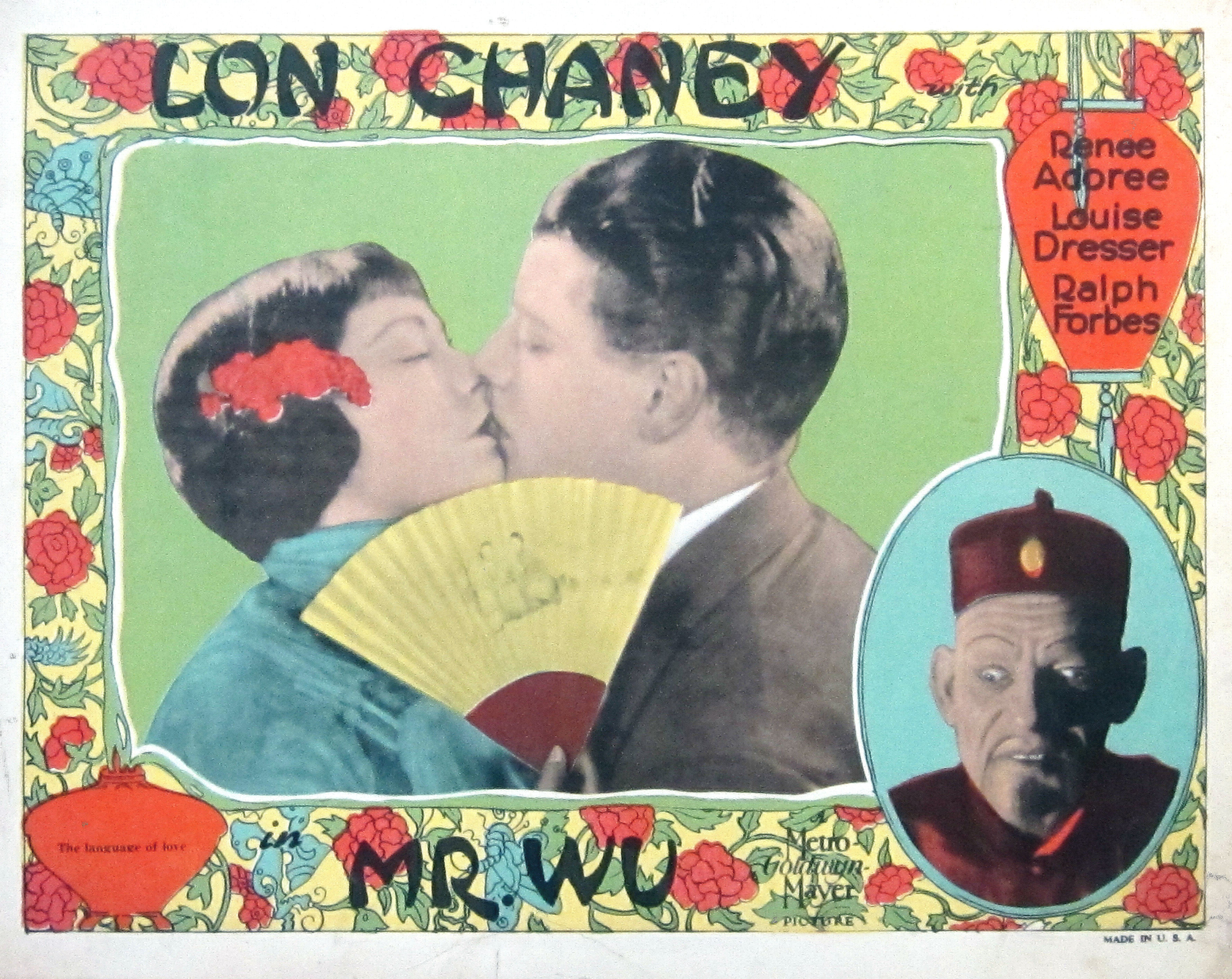
Original lobby card with Lon Chaney

- Lon Chaney as Mr. Wu/Grandfather Wu
- Louise Dresser as Mrs. Gregory
- Renée Adorée as Wu Nang Ping
- Holmes Herbert as Mr. Gregory
- Ralph Forbes as Basil Gregory
- Gertrude Olmstead as Hilda Gregory
- Mrs. Wong Wing as Ah Wong
- Claude King as Mr. James Muir
- Sonny Loy as Little Wu
- Anna May Wong as Loo Song
- Toshia Mori as Nang Ping's friend (credited as Toshia Ichioka)

== Production ==
Mr. Wu was originally a stage play, written by Harold Owen and Harry M. Vernon. It was first staged in London in 1913; the first U.S. production opened in New York on October 14, 1914 with stage star Walker Whiteside playing Wu.

The film was shot at Metro-Goldwyn-Mayer Studios in Culver City, California. Script supervisor Willard Sheldon later recalled that Chaney had a good working relationship with director William Nigh and that production went smoothly.

== Release ==
Mr. Wu was released on March 26, 1927. Wu Li Chang, a Spanish-language version of Mr. Wu, was produced in 1930.
