= Gwili Andre =

Danish model and actress (1907–1959)

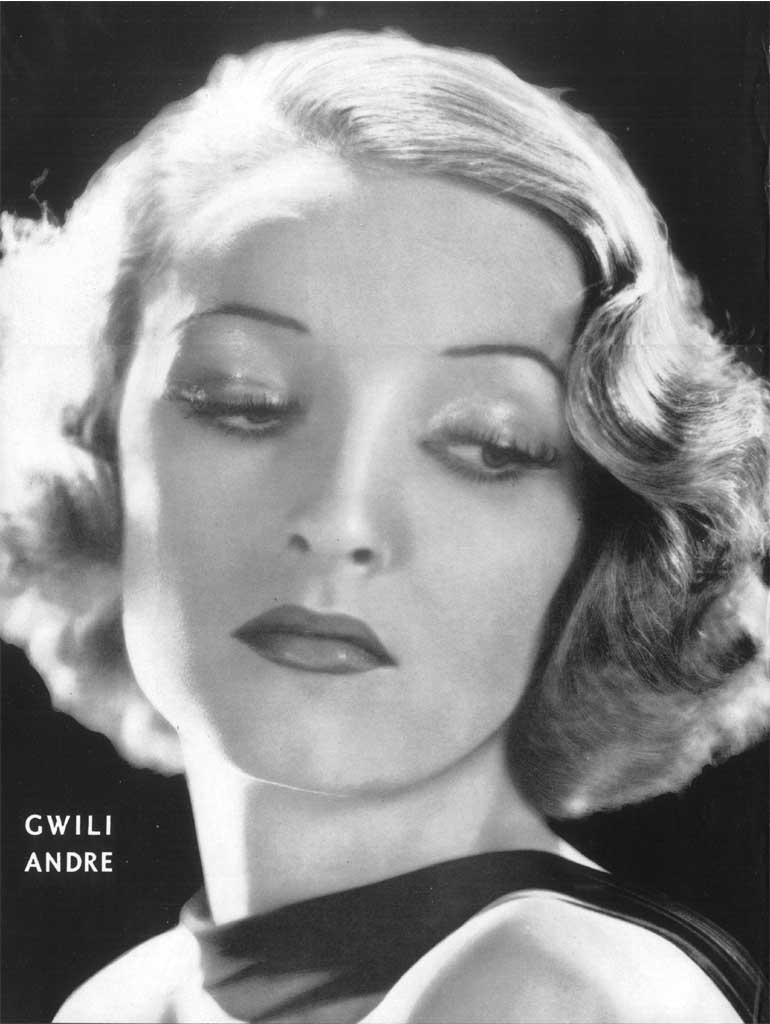
- Andre in 1932
- Born: Gurli Ingeborg Elna Andresen; 4 February 1907; Copenhagen, Denmark
- Died: 5 February 1959 (aged 52); Venice, California, U.S.
- Other names: Gwili Mlotkowski; Gwili A. Cross
- Occupations: Model, actress
- Years active: 1932–1942
- Spouses: Stanisŀaw Mlotkowski (m. 1929; div. 1935) William Dallas Cross, Jr. (m. 1940; div. 1948)
- Children: 1

Gwili Andre (born Gurli Ingeborg Elna Andresen; 4 February 1907 – 5 February 1959) was a Danish model and actress who had a brief career in Hollywood films.

== Early years ==
Born in Frederiksberg, Andre had two sisters. Her parents were Carl Axel Andresen and Emma Marie Ellen Sørensen Bruun, married in 1904. Her parents divorced, and her father remarried in 1917.

== Career ==
Andre immigrated to the United States in the mid-1920s. She soon found success as a fashion model and became a particular favorite of Edward Steichen. Photographs of Andre regularly appeared in Vogue at the end of the 1920s and into the early 1930s, at which time she was frequently credited as Jule Andre. Around 1932, she was said to have been spotted by David O. Selznick while attending a Broadway show. On his invitation, she submitted to a screen test, and was soon signed to a contract by RKO Pictures.

In 1932, Andre appeared in Roar of the Dragon and Secrets of the French Police. While her striking looks were likened to that of Greta Garbo and Marlene Dietrich, her acting garnered poor reviews. One newspaper columnist called her a "stiff, colorless and completely talentless performer." Despite the poor reviews of her acting, RKO began using her glamorous looks to promote her career. A widespread publicity campaign ensured that her name and face became well known to the American public, but her next role in No Other Woman (1933), opposite Irene Dunne, was not the success the studio expected. Over the next few years, she was relegated to supporting roles which included a role in the Joan Crawford picture A Woman's Face (1941).

== Personal life ==
Andre was married twice. She was married to prize-winning chess master and realtor Stanisław (Stasch) Mlotkowski in 1929. They separated in 1930 and divorced in 1935. Andre then married engineer William Dallas Cross Jr. in 1943. They had a son, Peter Lance Cross, in February 1944. They divorced in 1948.

== Later years and death ==
By the early 1940s, Andre's film career had come to a standstill. Her final role was a minor part in The Falcon's Brother, one of the popular Falcon series, in 1942. She did not return to the screen, but she spent the rest of her life trying to orchestrate a comeback. Andre returned to her native Denmark with her son after her divorce from William Cross Jr. but returned to New York City in 1954. She eventually moved back to California.

On 5 February 1959, Andre died in a fire that started in her apartment in Venice, California where she lived alone. The cause of the fire never was determined. Upon her death, she was cremated at Forest Lawn Memorial Park in Glendale, California, with funeral services conducted at the Little Church of the Flowers, and her ashes sent for burial at Søndermark Cemetery in Copenhagen, Denmark.

== Filmography ==
Year	Title	Role	Director
1932	Roar of the Dragon	Natascha	Wesley Ruggles
1932	Secrets of the French Police	Eugenie Dorain	A. Edward Sutherland
1933	No Other Woman	Margot Van Deering	J. Walter Ruben
1937	Meet the Boyfriend	Vilma Vlare	Ralph Staub
1937	The Girl Said No	Gretchen Holman	Andrew L. Stone
1941	A Woman's Face	Gusta	George Cukor
1942	The Falcon's Brother	Diane Medford	Stanley Logan
