= A Woman's Face =

1941 film by George Cukor

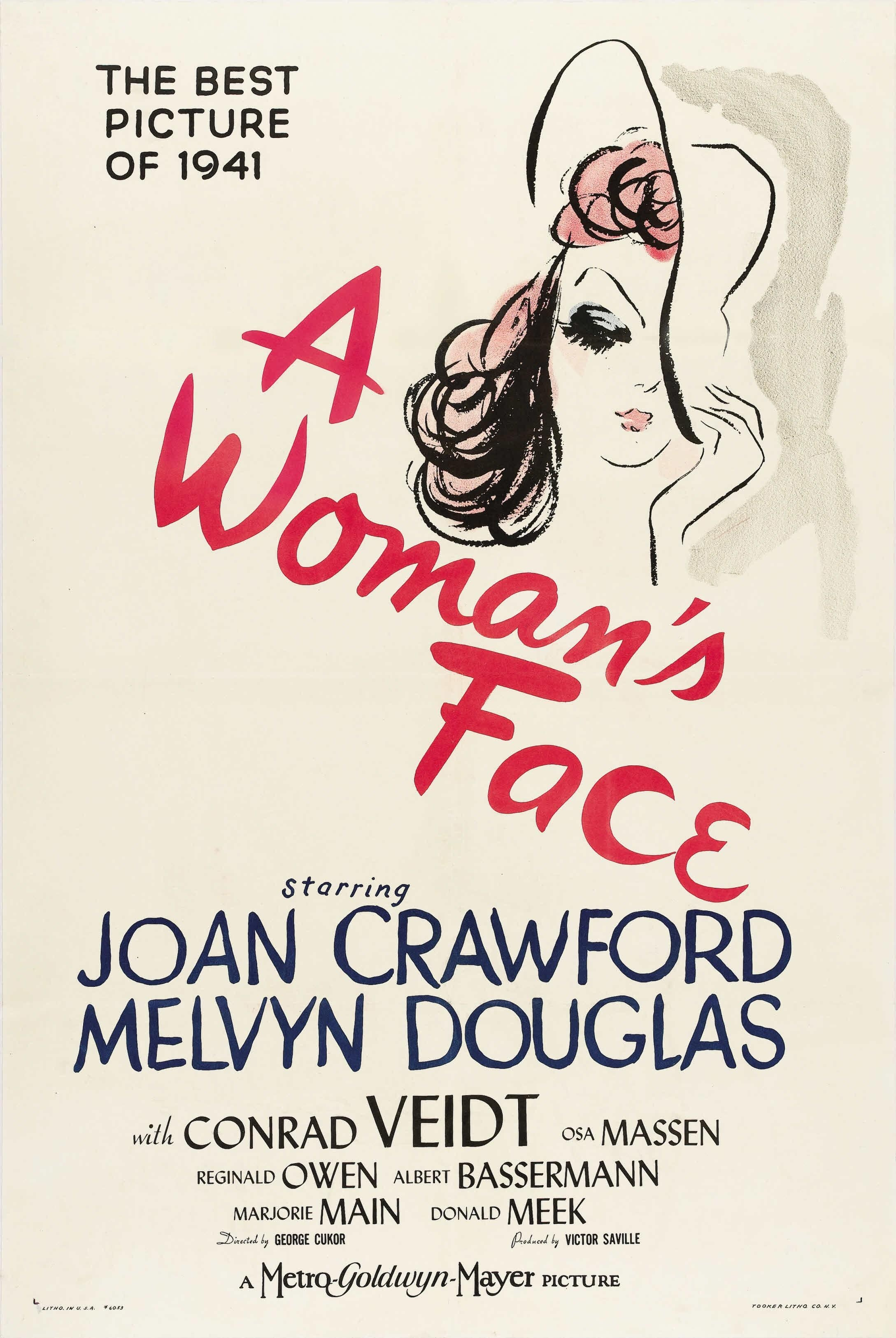
- Theatrical release poster
- Directed by: George Cukor
- Screenplay by: Donald Ogden Stewart; Elliot Paul
- Based on: Il était une fois... 1932 play by Francis de Croisset
- Produced by: Victor Saville
- Starring: Joan Crawford; Melvyn Douglas; Conrad Veidt
- Cinematography: Robert Planck
- Edited by: Frank Sullivan
- Music by: Bronislau Kaper
- Production company: Metro-Goldwyn-Mayer
- Distributed by: Loew's Inc.
- Release date: May 23, 1941
- Running time: 105 minutes
- Country: United States
- Language: English
- Budget: $1,343,000
- Box office: $1,907,000

A Woman's Face is a 1941 American drama film noir directed by George Cukor and starring Joan Crawford, Melvyn Douglas, and Conrad Veidt. The screenplay was written by Donald Ogden Stewart and Elliot Paul, based on the play Il était une fois... by French playwright Francis de Croisset.

Anna Holm, a facially disfigured blackmailer, because of her appearance, despises everyone she encounters. When a plastic surgeon corrects this disfigurement, Anna becomes torn between the hope of starting a new life and a return to her dark past. Most of the film is told in flashbacks as witnesses in a courtroom give their testimonies.

== Plot ==
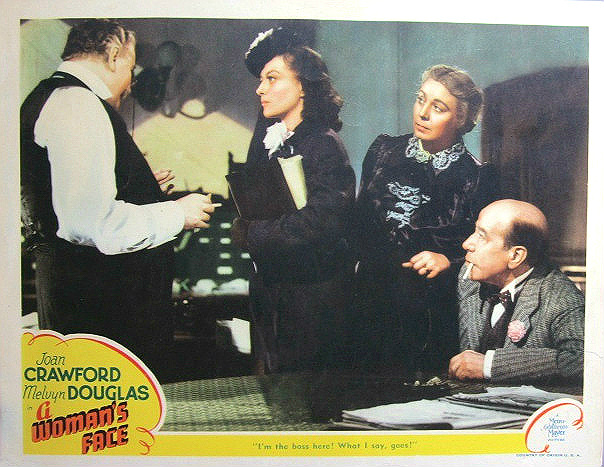
Several shots in the film obscure Anna Holm's disfigurement via a selective angle or costumes.

Anna Holm is on trial in Stockholm for murdering an unnamed victim. Her hat conceals her face.

The first witness, Herman Rundvik, a waiter, recalls a dinner at a secluded tavern, hosted by the charismatic and profligate Torsten Barring. Guests include Vera, the unfaithful wife of plastic surgeon Gustaf Segert, and Eric, Vera's latest conquest.

The manager, Bernard Dalvik, refuses credit, and Torsten meets the proprietress, Anna. The right side of her face is mutilated, but Torsten ignores her scars and compliments her beautiful eyes. Anna forgives the bill and hints that she might be useful to him. After the party leaves, Eric returns to ask Rundvik if something dropped from his overcoat pocket. Back in the courtroom, Rundvik identifies Anna as boss of their blackmail ring.

Next up is Bernard Dalvik. On the advice of her masseuse—Dalvik's wife, Christina—Vera comes to them for help: someone has her letters to Eric. Torsten calls on Anna while Dalvik is making the arrangements with Vera. Anna brings Torsten into their gang and falls deeply in love.

Vera testifies: Anna comes to sell the letters. Gustaf returns home unexpectedly; Anna trips, injuring her ankle. He wants to call the police, but Vera dissuades him. Intrigued by Anna's scars, Gustaf offers to heal her. Vera protests, and her testimony ends.

Anna is called to testify and remembers that, when she was five years old, her drunken father set her room on fire; he saved her, but not himself. When she was 16, hating the world that shunned her, she chose a life of crime. She describes a meeting with Torsten at his apartment in which she reveals much about herself. "We are both proud, both wretched," he says. They toast their partnership.

Anna endures twelve painful operations. Gustaf wonders: Is she Galatea? Or is she Frankenstein's monster—a beautiful face with no heart? Dissolve to the courtroom: Anna removes her hat, revealing a perfect face.

Torsten is amazed by her new beauty. She reassures him: She has not joined "the saints". He tells her that his very old, very rich uncle, Consul Magnus Barring, has bequeathed everything to his four-year-old grandson. If the boy dies, Torsten will inherit. Anna is horrified, but Torsten compels her. In the courtroom, she admits that she agreed to kill the child.

She becomes the boy's governess and goes to Barring Hall as Ingrid Paulsen. The house is in the mountains, across the river from the metal works that produces the Barring fortune. Anna becomes fond of the kindly Consul and the sweet-natured little Lars-Erik. Torsten arrives on the eve of the Consul's birthday. He dances with Anna; she is mesmerized. The house guests include Gustaf, who tells Anna that he believes in her reform and will keep her secret. The next day, Anna accidentally leaves Lars-Erik under a sun lamp too long. Her genuine distress makes Torsten doubt her, and he gives her an ultimatum: Lars-Erik must die before the next night. In the courtroom she says, "because... it was what he wanted".

Gustaf picks up the story. The next day, Anna takes the child for a cablecar ride to the mill. Gustaf climbs aboard an ore bucket on a neighboring cable. He sees her start to pull the bolt on the gate, but she shoves it back and hugs the oblivious child. To Lars-Erik's delight, Gustaf passes them. Gustaf questions a furious Anna. The screen pans to the courtroom. He believes she was angry because he doubted her. The prosecutor accuses Gustaf of loving her; he does not deny it.

Emma Kristiansdotter, the jealous housekeeper, is next. In the attic getting robes for the birthday sleigh ride, she overhears Anna and Torsten, who scorns the "dove" she has become and reveals his ambitions to do in Sweden "what has been done in other countries". Downstairs, Anna gives the Consul a pocket chess set, which he hands to Emma, who stops, abruptly.

The Consul recalls the sleigh ride. Torsten speeds by with Lars-Erik, lashing the horses, Anna and Gustaf in pursuit. Torsten won't stop, so Anna shoots him. He slips into the river and over the falls. The Consul believes Anna is innocent, but the judges are not satisfied. Anna protests that she left a message inside the chess set. Emma admits to keeping the letter, but she is above reading other people's mail. It is a full confession—and a suicide note, also warning the Consul about the evil plans of Torsten. While the judges deliberate, Gustaf coaxes Anna into admitting that she loves him. As they kiss, the clerk enters to tell them that the judges are ready to deliver their verdict, implying optimistically that Gustaf should come too. The couple walks back to the courtroom holding hands.

== Cast ==
- Joan Crawford as Anna Holm (alias Ingrid Paulsen)
- Melvyn Douglas as Dr. Gustaf Segert
- Conrad Veidt as Torsten Barring
- Osa Massen as Vera Segert
- Reginald Owen as Bernard Dalvik
- Albert Bassermann as Consul Magnus Barring
- Marjorie Main as Emma Kristiansdotter
- Donald Meek as Herman Rundvik
- Connie Gilchrist as Christina Dalvik
- Richard Nichols as Lars-Erik Barring
- Charles Quigley as Eric
- Gwili Andre as Gusta
- Clifford Brooke as Wickman
- George Zucco as Defense Attorney
- Henry Kolker as Judge
- Robert Warwick as Associate Judge
- Gilbert Emery as Associate Judge
- Henry Daniell as Public Prosecutor
- Sarah Padden as Police Matron
- William Farnum as Court Attendant

== Marketing ==
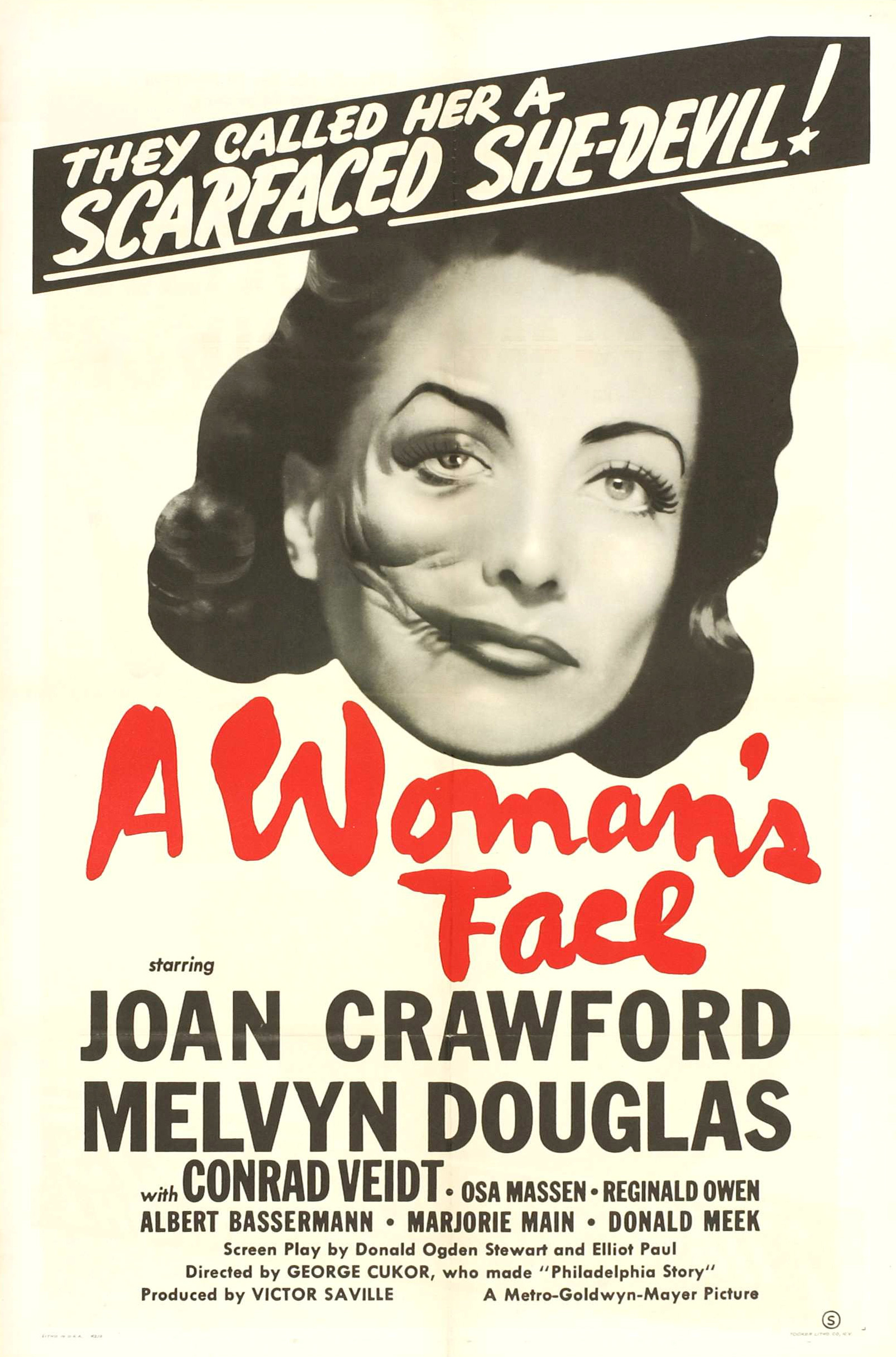
This poster for the film highlights the protagonist's scars.

Advertising for the film appears in a photograph by Robert Frank. One of the images of Crawford used in the advertising later was included in the album artwork for the Rolling Stones album Exile on Main St. (1972).

== Reception ==
=== Box office ===
According to MGM records the film earned $1,077,000 in the U.S. and Canada and $830,000 elsewhere.

=== Critical response ===
Variety wrote that "Miss Crawford takes a radical step as a screen glamour girl to allow the makeup necessary for facial disfiguration in the first half ... [Crawford] has a strongly dramatic and sympathetic role ... which she handles in top-notch fashion."

More recently, the film critic Dennis Schwartz discussed the importance of the role to Joan Crawford:

Joan Crawford jumped at the chance to star in this juicy role despite having to play a facially disfigured woman (at least for half the film), which she was advised by even Louis B. Mayer (MGM head) [...] could be costly for the glamor actress in the future. Instead it turned out to be one of her more acclaimed roles and did nothing but promote her career further as a serious dramatic actress (she won an Oscar for Mildred Pierce in 1945, which she claims this film had a cumulative effect in helping her win [...]). Crawford's scar makeup was credited to Jack Dawn, who created makeup for such films as The Wizard of Oz (1939) and Dr. Jekyll and Mr. Hyde (1941).
