= Toshia Mori =

Japanese-born American actress (1912-1995)

- トシア・モリ
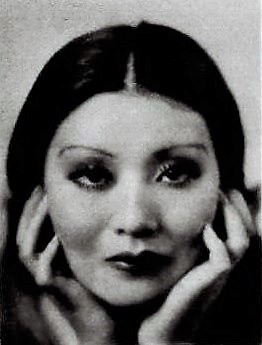
- Born: Toshiye Ichioka; January 1, 1912; Kyoto, Empire of Japan
- Died: November 26, 1995 (aged 83); New York City, U.S.
- Other names: Toshia Ichioka, Toshi Ichioka, Toshi Mori, Tashia Mori, Shia Jung
- Occupation: Actress
- Years active: 1927–1937
- Spouse: Allen Jung (m. 1934)

Toshia Mori (トシア・モリ) (January 1, 1912 – November 26, 1995) was a Japanese-born American actress who had a brief Hollywood film career during the late 1920s and 1930s. Born as Toshiye Ichioka (市岡俊恵) in Kyoto, Mori moved to the United States when she was 10.

== Early life and career ==
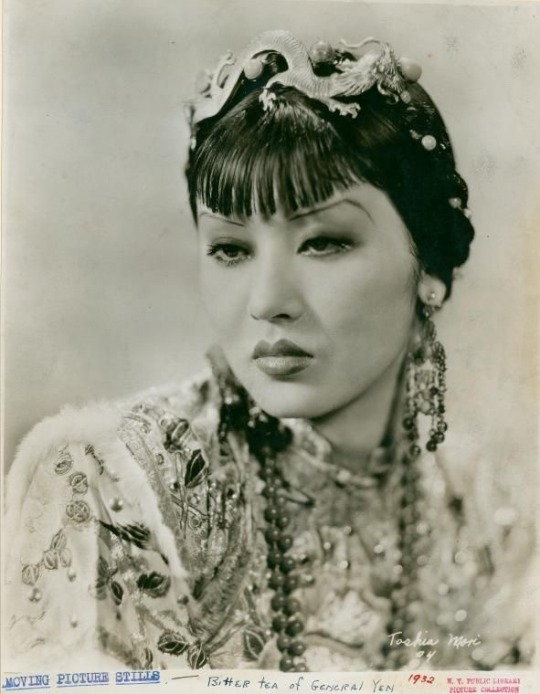
Mori in The Bitter Tea of General Yen (1933).

Mori began her film career in silent films in the late 1920s. In Mr. Wu (1927) she was credited as Toshia Ichioka. In Streets of Shanghai (1927), she was credited as Toshiye Ichioka. In The Man Without a Face, she was also credited as Toshiye Ichioka, her birth name. (The film is presumed lost.) Finally, she entered the sound era as Toshia Mori.

Mori played Miss Ling in The Hatchet Man (1932). In the same year, she played another Chinese character, "Butterfly", in Roar of the Dragon, an action-melodrama produced by David O. Selznick. The storyline consisted of a group of Occidentals turning to an alcoholic riverboat captain Chauncey Carson (Richard Dix) for help when they are trapped at a hotel in a Mandarin town under siege.

In 1932, Toshia became the only actress of Asian descent and person of color to be selected as a WAMPAS Baby Star, an annual list of young and promising film actresses. WAMPAS may have led to the most significant film role of her career, for shortly afterward, she appeared in Frank Capra's film The Bitter Tea of General Yen (1933), a role that was originally scheduled for Anna May Wong. The story involved the erotically charged relationship between a missionary (Barbara Stanwyck) and a Chinese warlord (Nils Asther). The script also featured a vital character, Mah-Li, a concubine whose scheming throws a spanner into the plots of those around her. Capra and Columbia Pictures, both extremely happy with Mori's work, awarded her third billing. Time's favorable review read: "Stanwyck is satisfactory but the most noteworthy female member of the cast is Toshia Mori, a sloe-eyed Japanese girl…"

Mori returned to minor characters in her subsequent films. In The Painted Veil (1934), starring Greta Garbo, she materializes as the centerpiece of "The Moon Festival" sequence. In Chinatown Squad (1935) she played "Wanda". She appeared in Charlie Chan at the Circus in 1936, and in Charlie Chan on Broadway (1937), Lee (Keye Luke) becomes involved with Ling Tse (Toshia Mori), an employee of the Hottentot Club.

== Post-cinema life ==
In 1930, Mori married Allen Jung, a Chinese-American actor from San Francisco. After her film career ended, Mori worked as a researcher for Robert Ripley on his short films, Ripley's Believe It or Not!. She died in The Bronx in New York City, aged 83.

== Filmography ==
Film
Year	Film	Role	Notes
1926	The Non-Stop Flight		uncredited
1926	The House Without a Key		uncredited; Lost film
1927	Mr. Wu		credited as Toshia
1927	Streets of Shanghai		credited as Toshyie; Lost film
1928	The Man Without a Face		credited as Toshiye Ichioka.; Lost film
1932	The Secrets of Wu Sin		
1932	The Hatchet Man	Miss Ling, Secretary	
1932	Tiger Shark	Oriental Lady Barber (uncredited)	
1932	Roar of the Dragon	Butterfly	
1933	The Bitter Tea of General Yen	Mah-Li, Concubine	
1933	Blondie Johnson	Lulu	
1933	Fury of the Jungle	Chita	
1934	The Painted Veil	Centrepiece	centrepiece of "The Moon Festival" sequence
1935	Chinatown Squad	Wanda	
1936	Charlie Chan at the Circus	Su Toy, contortionist	credited as Shia Jung
1937	Charlie Chan on Broadway	Ling Tse, receptionist	
