= Allen Jung =

American actor

- Publicity Photo of Allen Jung
- Born: Allen Durlin Jung; August 8, 1909; Oakland, California, U.S.
- Died: September 12, 1982 (aged 73); Los Angeles, California, U.S.
- Occupation: Actor
- Spouse: Toshia Mori (div.)

Allen Jung (August 8, 1909 – September 12, 1982) was an American film and television actor who was active in Hollywood from the 1930s through the 1970s.

== Biography ==
Allen was born in Oakland, California. He attended the University of California, where he learned how to speak Japanese. He credited his education for preparing him to play Japanese roles. He also earned his pilot's license around this time.

He began his career as an actor in the early 1930s; he was a member of the Chinese Cinema Players, an organization in Los Angeles. During World War II, he joined the U.S. Navy.

He was married to Japanese actress Toshia Mori; he later married Helen Yu-Ling Wong in Shanghai.

== Selected filmography ==
- Star Spangled Girl (1971)
- The Love Bug (1968)
- The Party (1968)
- Hillbillys in a Haunted House (1967)
- The Last of the Secret Agents? (1966)
- Kentucky Jones (TV series, episode "Ike′s Song," 1964)
- Blood and Steel (1959)
- The Purple Heart (1944)
- Rookies in Burma (1943)
- Guadalcanal Diary (1943)
- Behind the Rising Sun (1943)
- We've Never Been Licked (1943)
- Yanks Ahoy (1943)
- Night Plane from Chungking (1943)
- Mission to Moscow (1943)
- G-Men vs. The Black Dragon (1943)
- Flying Tigers (1942)
- Somewhere I'll Find You (1942)
- Submarine Raider (1942)
- A Yank on the Burma Road (1942)
- Terry and the Pirates (1940)
- Murder by Television (1935)
- She Learned About Sailors (1934)
- The Mask of Fu Manchu (1932)
