= Roar of the Dragon =

1932 film

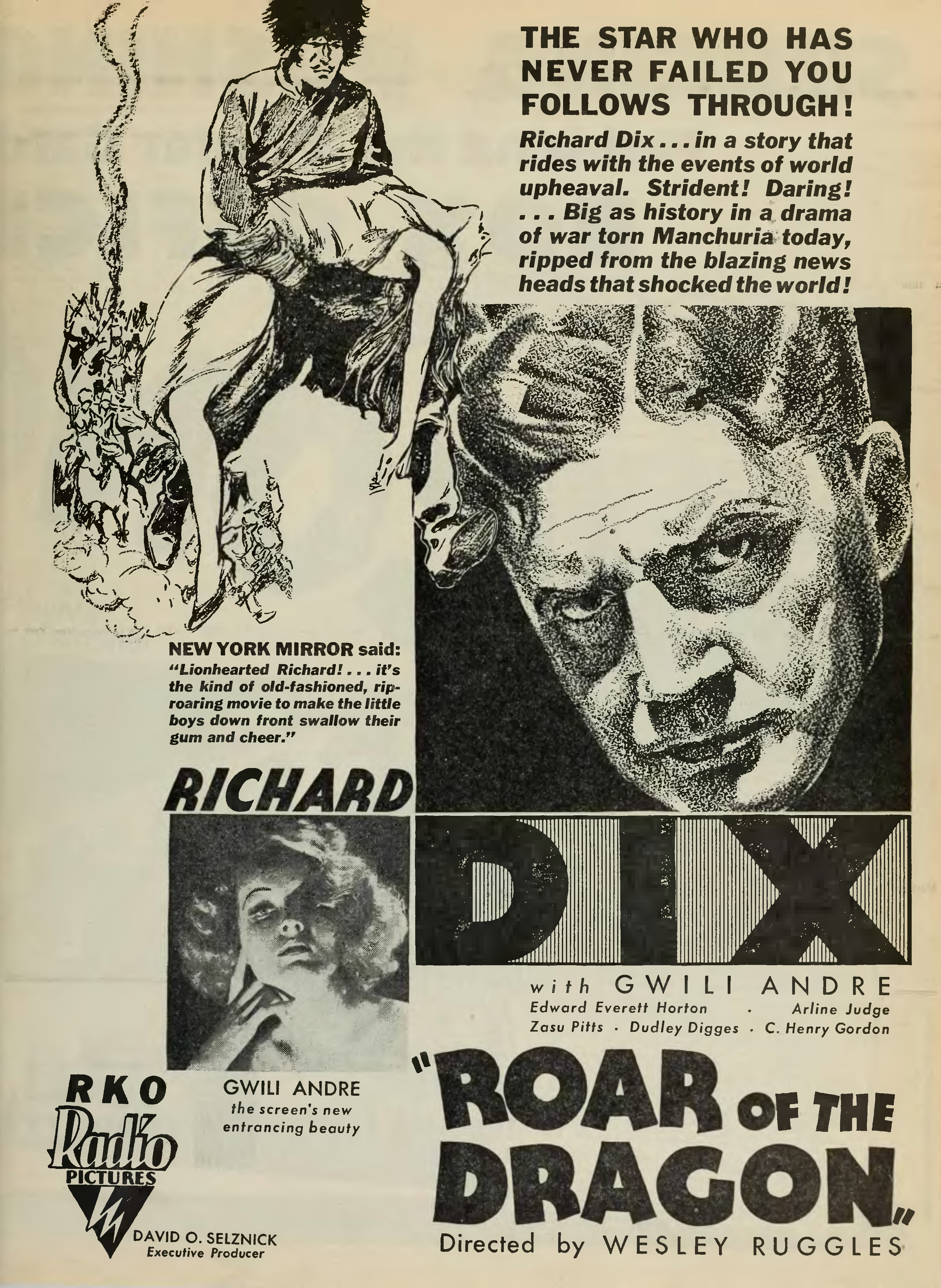
- Directed by: Wesley Ruggles
- Screenplay by: Howard Estabrook
- Story by: Merian C. Cooper; Jane Bigelow
- Based on: the novel, A Passage to Hong Kong novel by George Kibbe Turner
- Produced by: William LeBaron
- Starring: Richard Dix; Gwili Andre; Edward Everett Horton; Arline Judge; ZaSu Pitts
- Cinematography: Edward Cronjager
- Edited by: William Hamilton
- Music by: Max Steiner
- Production company: RKO Pictures
- Distributed by: RKO Pictures
- Release date: July 8, 1932
- Running time: 69 minutes
- Country: United States
- Language: English

Roar of the Dragon is a 1932 American Pre-Code adventure film directed by Wesley Ruggles and written by Howard Estabrook and released on July 8, 1932. The film stars Richard Dix, Gwili Andre, Edward Everett Horton, Arline Judge, and ZaSu Pitts. It follows tourists and a riverboat crew as they resist attacks from a vengeful bandit while the riverboat is in repair. The story is based on A Passage to Hong Kong by George Kibbe Turner. Some concern arose concerning Horton's pay, but it remained unaddressed. Upon its release, Roar of the Dragon received reviews both praising and criticizing its action elements.

== Plot ==
Before the film begins, a bandit named Voronsky had attacked a tourist riverboat captained by Chauncey Carson. During the attack, Voronsky damaged the riverboat and Carson bit off his ear. Carson and the passengers escaped and fled to a Chinese village in Manchuria, staying in a hotel while waiting for boat repairs. The film then begins in media res, with Voronsky vowing to locate and seek revenge on Carson. A man who is not on Voronsky's side overhears and warns the people of the Manchurian village that Voronsky and his men are coming. Johnson, the owner of the riverboat, is anxious to leave as soon as possible, but the group cannot leave because the boat is not yet fixed. Johnson rebukes a drunk Carson for not taking the situation seriously enough.

Carson plans to meet a mysterious woman staying at the hotel, but the proprietor's daughter warns him against it, telling him that the woman is rumored to be Voronsky's associate. Carson ignores the warning and meets the woman. The woman, whose name is Natascha, reveals that she is Voronsky's prisoner, and that some time ago Voronsky had held her father captive for ransom. She asks Carson to help her escape from Voronsky's power. Their discussion is interrupted when Voronsky's men rampage through the village, killing many people. Carson and his passengers rescue a group of children and an injured man named Sholem, bringing them into the hotel and locking the courtyard gates. When Voronsky's men try to climb over into the courtyard, Carson and a member of his crew kill them with a machine gun. Afterward Carson confronts Natascha, accusing her of leaking information to Voronsky. She asserts her innocence, but he does not believe her and decides to use her to get information about Voronsky.

The hotel is under siege by Voronsky's men, who plan to starve the people out. Meanwhile, Natascha warns Carson that a spy is among the group trapped in the hotel, and he accuses her of being the spy. Meanwhile, Hortense, one of the boat passengers, takes care of the children. While going about her duties, Hortense and her love interest Busby discover a hotel staff member sneaking around. They report to Carson, who apprehends him and locks him up. Later, Voronsky's men locate and sabotage the hotel's water pipe. Carson discovers their plan in time to collect a barrel of water.

Back at Voronsky's camp, one of his men tells him that Carson is in love with Natascha. Angry, Voronsky resolves to be at the head of the next attack rather than stay behind at camp. Matters become more desperate for the group trapped at the hotel when they run out of food and the water supply is purposefully spilled. It is revealed that a quiet, observant hotel employee is the spy. Eventually Natascha declares her love for Carson, and he promises her safety from Voronsky. While taking care of the children, Hortense is shot through the window and dies. Heartbroken, Busby decides to operate the machine gun so he can seek justice by killing Voronsky's men. Later, Sholem sneaks from the hotel to retrieve food from his butcher shop, but he is assaulted by Voronsky's men and burned alive. Carson kills him with the machine gun to end the pain.

Voronsky finds a way into the hotel courtyard and takes Natascha hostage. When he threatens to hurt Natascha if Carson does not hand over the key to the gate, Carson does so with little resistance. He then attempts to negotiate with Voronsky to get Natascha back, but is interrupted when Voronsky's men charge through the gate. Voronsky escapes and leaves Natascha with Carson. Busby kills several of Voronsky's men with the machine gun. Following the attack, Carson decides to stay at the hotel to fight off Voronsky while the others escape to the riverboat, which is now fixed. Busby remains with Carson and keeps watch from below while Carson controls the machine gun from above. Voronsky again finds a way to enter the courtyard and flings a knife at Busby. Carson kills Voronsky with the gun. He carries a wounded Busby to the riverboat, which is on the brink of leaving port. Busby dies after they board. The riverboat successfully leaves port to travel to a new destination.

== Cast ==
- Richard Dix as Chauncey Carson
- Gwili Andre as Natascha
- Edward Everett Horton as Busby
- Arline Judge as Hortense O'Dare
- ZaSu Pitts as Gabby Woman
- Dudley Digges as Johnson
- C. Henry Gordon as Voronsky
- William Orlamond as Dr. Pransnitz
- Arthur Stone as Sholem
- Jimmy Wang as hotel proprietor
- Toshia Mori as Chinese Proprietor's Daughter
- Wong Chung as Voronsky Henchman
- Will Stanton as Sailor Sam

== Production and release ==
Roar of the Dragon was produced and distributed by RKO Pictures. Its storyline was developed and written by Merian C. Cooper and Jane Bigelow, who based it on A Passage to Hong Kong by George Kibbe Turner. Scripts for the film were written from winter 1932 to spring of the same year by Howard Estabrook. Production commenced in May. In June the production team added a sequence of newspaper headlines to the film's beginning that discuss its eventual circumstances and outcomes. RKO secured its copyright for the film on July 1, 1932. William LeBaron was originally to be credited as Roar of the Dragon's producer, but his credits were removed following the settlement of his contract with RKO. Meanwhile, David O. Selznick was credited as the executive producer. It was directed by Wesley Ruggles with the uncredited assistance of Dewey Starkey. Carroll Clark was the film's production designer. Music was composed by Max Steiner. By Selznick's wish, Edward Everett Horton was paid $3,500 a week. Ned Depinet, the executive sales manager, was dissatisfied with this because he felt that "while [Horton] is reputed to be an excellent actor, he has not five cents worth of box office". Horton's character was written to bring a comedic aspect to the story. Also intended for comedy, ZaSu Pitts was cast as a talkative, complaining tourist. The film marked Gwili Andre's screen debut.

The film location that portrayed Manchuria was credited as "Chinese street". At the time, Hollywood was pushing to increase its volume of "Oriental pictures", creating a goal to provide 30,000 workdays for Chinese American film extras. Roar of the Dragon was produced in pursuit of this goal. Typically Chinese Americans playing silent roles in Hollywood films earned $7.50 a day while those with speaking roles earned $10-$15 a day.

Roar of the Dragon was released on July 8, 1932.

== Reception ==
Roar of the Dragon was generally disliked by reviewers, though some enjoyed the action elements. According to film historian Richard B. Jewell and RKO archivist Vernon Harbin, "audiences took no pleasure" in the film and "it soon withered away, unloved and unmourned". The Film Daily called it a "choppy tale" and "wild melodrama" whose "direction [was] handicapped" by the story. It also called the film "only good for an undiscriminating audience". The New York Times wrote that "it has the same old plot, the same situations,...[as] those of the past", and considered it "a bloody affair, and a loud one". Motion Picture Herald held a more favorable view, calling it "a vivid story, bristling with action, tingling with dramatic suspense". It predicted that the film would do well in the box office, also praising the "sweet tinge of ZaSu Pitts' comedy". The Missouri Miner, a student-run university newspaper, wrote that it "offers excellent entertainment if you like action".

More recent reviews hold varying opinions. Jewell and Harbin credit Gwili as "one of the damaging weaknesses", while stating that Horton and Pitts "had very thin material with which to work" in comedic elements. Film historian Mark Cotta Vaz calls the film's quick movement "characteristic of the spare, no-nonsense storytelling inherent in Cooper's earliest work at RKO."
