= Streets of Shanghai =

1927 American silent drama film

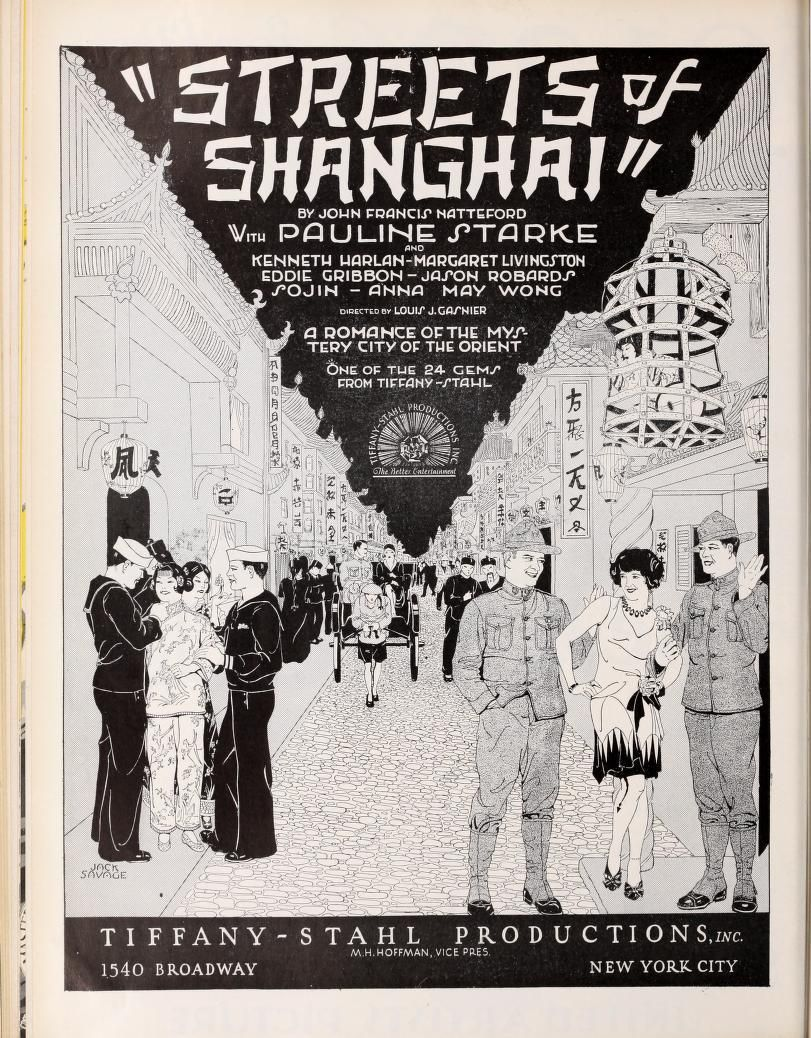
- Directed by: Louis J. Gasnier
- Written by: Viola Brothers Shore; Harry Braxton; Jack Natteford
- Produced by: John M. Stahl
- Starring: Pauline Starke
- Cinematography: Max Dupont; E. Fox Walker
- Distributed by: Tiffany Pictures
- Release date: December 15, 1927
- Running time: 6 reels (5,276 feet)
- Country: United States
- Language: Silent (English intertitles)

Streets of Shanghai is a 1927 American silent drama film directed by Louis J. Gasnier and written by Harry Braxton and Jack Natteford. The film, starring Pauline Starke, Kenneth Harlan, and Eddie Gribbon, was released by Tiffany-Stahl Productions.

== Cast ==
- Pauline Starke as Mary Sanger
- Kenneth Harlan as Sergeant Lee
- Eddie Gribbon as Swede
- Margaret Livingston as Sadie
- Jason Robards, Sr. as Eugene Fong (as Jason Robards)
- Mathilde Comont as Buttercup, Mary's Companion
- Sōjin Kamiyama as Fong Kiang
- Anna May Wong as Su Quan
- Tetsu Komai as Chang Ho
- Toshia Mori as Girl Wife (as Toshyie Ichioka)
- Media Ichioka as F'aien Shi, the Chinese Girl

== Preservation status ==
This is now considered a lost film.

== See also ==
- List of American films of 1927
