= Secrets of the French Police =

1932 film by A. Edward Sutherland

- Directed by: A. Edward Sutherland
- Screenplay by: Robert Tasker; Samuel Ornitz; Robert Benchley
- Based on: Secrets of the Surete 1931 articles in American Weekly Sunday Magazine by H. Ashton Wolfe; The Lost Empress unpublished novel by Samuel Ornitz
- Produced by: David O. Selznick
- Starring: Gwili Andre; Gregory Ratoff; Frank Morgan; John Warburton
- Cinematography: Alfred Gilks
- Edited by: Arthur Roberts
- Music by: Max Steiner
- Production company: RKO Radio Pictures
- Distributed by: RKO Radio Pictures
- Release date: December 2, 1932
- Running time: 58 minutes
- Country: United States
- Language: English

Secrets of the French Police is a 1932 American Pre-Code crime "B" film produced by RKO Radio Pictures, mixing elements of a police procedural film and sensationalist gothic fiction. Adapted from a serial story by H. Ashton Wolfe published in The American Weekly magazine, the screenplay was co-written by Samuel Ornitz, who also drew from his own unpublished novel, The Last Empress. Directed by A. Edward Sutherland and starring Gwili Andre, Gregory Ratoff, Frank Morgan, and John Warburton, the movie used some of the sets from RKO's The Most Dangerous Game (1932).

== Plot ==
In Paris, Danton, a police officer who was murdered while working undercover is buried, with his mother receiving his posthumous Legion of Honor medal. François St. Cyr, lead detective of the Sûreté, sets out to find his killers, even posing at one point as a loudmouthed drunk to deflect suspicion from his team. In the meantime, Eugenie Dorain, an attractive flower girl, meets her boyfriend Leon Renault, himself a genial thief, and promises to meet him later when her foster father, Anton Dorain, urges her to return home. Anton, however, is killed in his apartment by a shadowy figure, and Eugenie is kidnapped and taken to the chateau of Hans Moloff, a Russian of mixed ancestry and a criminal mastermind. Moloff proceeds to hypnotize Eugenie and train her to impersonate the Russian princess Anastasia, often rumored to have survived her family's murder after the Russian Revolution, in order to lay claim to well-endowed trust funds set up in the princess's name.

St. Cyr at first suspects Renault and Moloff of being complicit in Danton's murder but soon clears Renault's name. However, St. Cyr realizes that Renault's talents as a thief can be useful in his investigations, especially in finding out what Moloff might up to. Renault is able to break into Moloff's chateau and discovers a basement laboratory outfitted with chemical and electrical devices but is forced to leave without encountering the captive Eugenie. At the same time, Moloff has already dispatched another of St. Cyr's agents, a woman known only as "K-31," and preserved her body as a statue for display, which St. Cyr is able to detect when he comes to talk with Moloff.

In addition, Moloff has arranged for a meeting between Eugenie posing as Anastasia and the Grand Duke Maxim, the real Anastasia's uncle, who quickly sees through the fraud since Eugenie's memories of her real life keep surfacing. Moloff, though, slips a forged document testifying to the woman's identity into Maxim's pocket and arranges for his death in a staged car crash. When St. Cyr is called to investigate the crash, he sees through the forgery and proves that the crash was no accident.

Renault, realizing that Eugenie may have been imprisoned, sneaks back into the chateau and finds her, waking her from her hypnotic trance. Moloff, however, captures the couple and takes them to his basement, where he proceeds to drain Eugenie's blood and turn her into another of his "sculptures" while a helpless Renault is forced to watch. At the last minute, St. Cyr and his men break into the laboratory. When a handcuffed Moloff attempts to break free and destroy the chateau, he is electrocuted by his own machine.

Finally, St. Cyr thanks Renault and gives his blessing to the now-married couple, but he insists that Renault will have to leave France to practice his unique skills elsewhere. As the couple drive off, St. Cyr realizes that Renault--who has vowed never to rob the French--has made an exception by taking St. Cyr's watch as a "souvenir."

== Cast ==
- Gwili Andre as Eugenie Dorain
- Gregory Ratoff as Han Moloff
- Frank Morgan as François St. Cyr
- John Warburton as Leon Renault
- Rochelle Hudson as K-31
- Christian Rub as Anton Dorain
- Murray Kinnell as Bertillon
- Arnold Korff as Grand Duke Maxim
- Kendall Lee as Rena Harka
- Lucien Prival as Lomzoi
- Guido Trento as Count de Marsay
- Wong Chung as Chinese Guard
- Harry Cording as Man Reading Newspaper
- Chester Gan as Chinese Guard
- Julia Swayne Gordon as Mme. Danton
- Kate Drain Lawson as Concierge
- Vivien Oakland as 2nd Cohort of Moloff
- Cyril Ring in undetermined minor role
- Ellinor Vanderveer as 1st Cohort of Moloff

== See also ==
- Romanov impostors

== Bibliography ==
- Bernard F. Dick, Radical Innocence: A Critical Study of the Hollywood Ten (University Press of Kentucky, 1988)
