= The Bitter Tea of General Yen =

1933 film

- Theatrical release poster
- Directed by: Frank Capra
- Screenplay by: Edward Paramore
- Based on: The Bitter Tea of General Yen; 1930 novel by Grace Zaring Stone
- Produced by: Walter Wanger
- Starring: Barbara Stanwyck; Nils Asther; Walter Connolly
- Cinematography: Joseph Walker
- Edited by: Edward Curtiss
- Music by: W. Frank Harling
- Color process: Black and white
- Production company: Columbia Pictures
- Distributed by: Columbia Pictures
- Release date: January 6, 1933 (US)
- Running time: 87 minutes
- Country: United States
- Language: English

The Bitter Tea of General Yen is a 1933 American pre-Code drama war film directed by Frank Capra and starring Barbara Stanwyck, and featuring Nils Asther and Walter Connolly. Based on the 1930 novel of the same name by Grace Zaring Stone, the film is about an American missionary in Shanghai during the Chinese Civil War who gets caught in a battle while trying to save a group of orphans. Knocked unconscious, she is saved by a Chinese general warlord who brings her to his palace. When the general falls in love with the naive young woman, she fights her attraction to the powerful general and resists his flirtation, yet remains at his side when his fortune turns.

The Bitter Tea of General Yen was the first film to play at Radio City Music Hall upon its opening on January 6, 1933. It was also one of the first films to deal openly with interracial sexual attraction. The film was a box office failure upon its release and has since been overshadowed by Capra's later efforts. In recent years, the film has grown in critical opinion. In 2000, the film was chosen by film critic Derek Malcolm as one of the hundred best films in The Century of Films.

== Plot ==
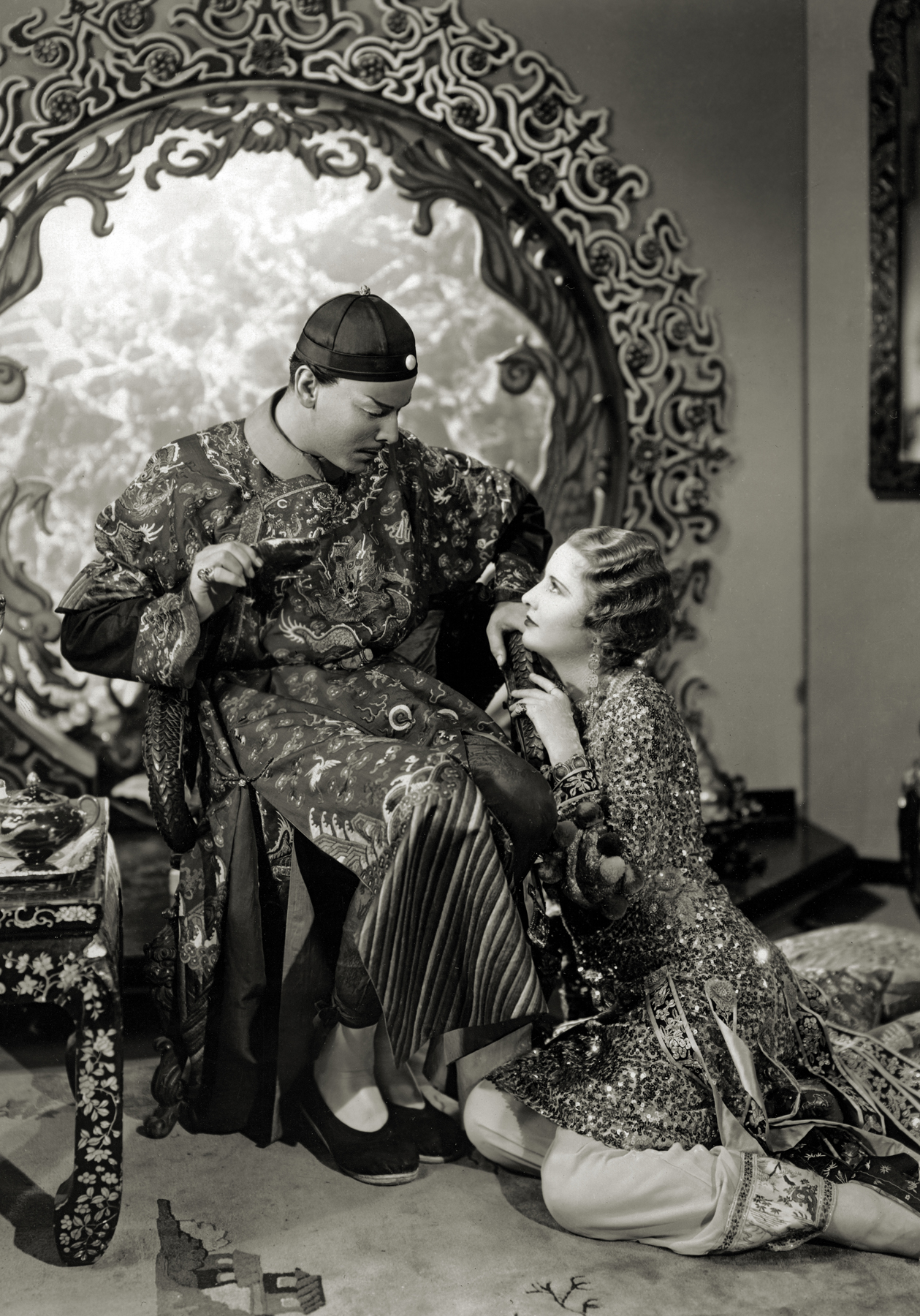
Nils Asther and Barbara Stanwyck as General Yen and Megan Davis.

In the late 1920s in Shanghai during the Chinese Civil War, as throngs of refugees flee the rainswept city, a couple of elderly Christian missionaries welcome guests to their home for the wedding of Dr. Robert Strike, a fellow missionary, and Megan Davis, his childhood sweetheart whom he has not seen in three years. Some of the missionaries have a cynical view of the Chinese people they have come to save. Shortly after Megan arrives, her fiancé Bob rushes in and postpones the wedding so he can rescue a group of orphans who are in danger from the spreading civil war. Megan insists on accompanying him on his mission.

On the way they stop at the headquarters of General Yen, a powerful Chinese warlord who controls the Shanghai region. While Megan waits in the car, Bob pleads with the general for a safe passage pass to Chapei so he can save the orphans. Contemptuous of Bob's missionary zeal, General Yen gives him a worthless paper that describes Bob's foolishness. Bob and Megan reach St. Andrews orphanage safely, but the pass only makes the soldiers laugh and steal their car when they try to leave with the children. The missionaries and children eventually reach the train station, but in the chaos, Bob and Megan are both knocked unconscious and are separated.

Sometime later, Megan regains consciousness in the private troop train of General Yen, attended by his concubine, Mah-Li. When they arrive at the general's summer palace, they are greeted by a man, Jones, Yen's American financial advisor, who tells him that he has succeeded in raising six million dollars, hidden in a nearby boxcar, for General Yen's war chest. Megan is shocked by the brutality of the executions conducted outside her window. Fascinated and attracted by the young beautiful missionary, the general has his men move the executions out of earshot and assures her that he will send her back to Shanghai as soon as it is safe.

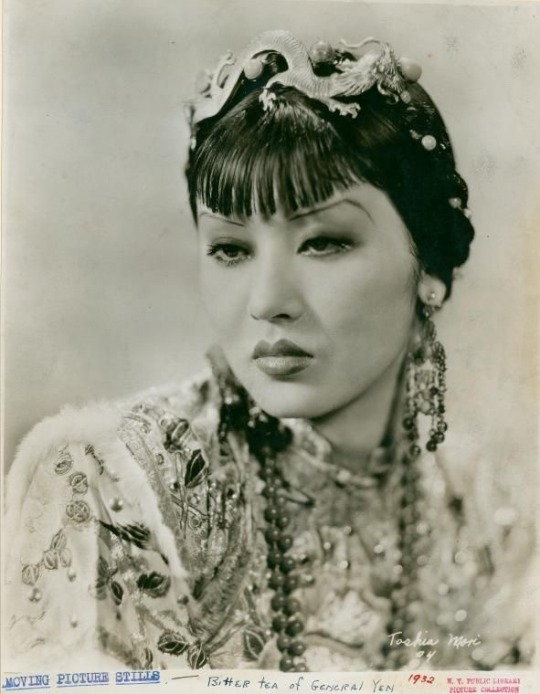
Toshia Mori as Mah-Li.

One evening, Megan drifts off to sleep and has an unsettling erotic dream about the general coming to her rescue and kissing her passionately. Soon after, she accepts the general's invitation to dinner. While they are dining, the general learns that his concubine Mah-Li has betrayed him with Captain Li, one of his soldiers. Later, after General Yen arrests Mah-Li for being a spy, Megan tries to intervene, appealing to his better nature. The general challenges her to prove her Christian ideals by forfeiting her own life if Mah-Li proves unfaithful again. Megan naively accepts and ends up unwittingly helping Mah-Li betray the general by passing information to his enemies about the location of his hidden fortune.

With the information provided by Mah-Li, the general's enemies steal his fortune, leaving him financially ruined and deserted by his soldiers and servants. General Yen is unable to take Megan's life—it is too precious to him. When she leaves his room in tears, he prepares a cup of poisoned tea for himself. Megan returns, dressed in the fine Chinese garments he gave her. She waits on him in the gentle manner of a concubine. When she says she could never leave him, he only smiles, then drinks the poisoned tea.

Sometime later, Megan and Jones are on a boat headed back to Shanghai. While discussing the beauty and tragedy of the general's life, Jones comforts Megan by saying that one day she will be with him again in another life.

== Cast ==
- Barbara Stanwyck as Megan Davis
- Nils Asther as General Yen
- Toshia Mori as Mah-Li
- Walter Connolly as Jones
- Gavin Gordon as Dr. Robert Strike
- Lucien Littlefield as Mr. Jackson
- Richard Loo as Capt. Li
- Helen Jerome Eddy as Miss Reed
- Emmett Corrigan as Bishop Harkness
- Clara Blandick as Mrs. Jackson (uncredited)
- Ella Hall as Mrs. Amelia Hansen (uncredited)

== Production ==
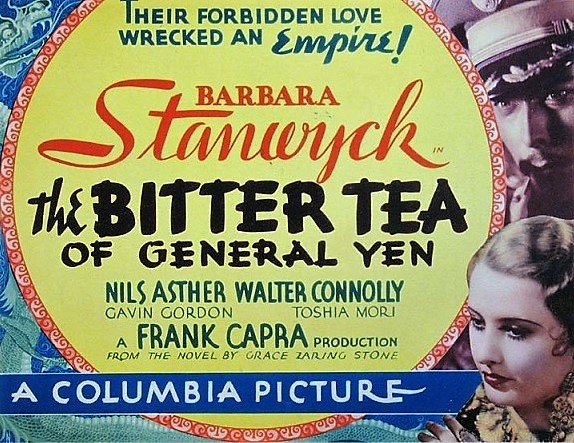
Theatrical release poster

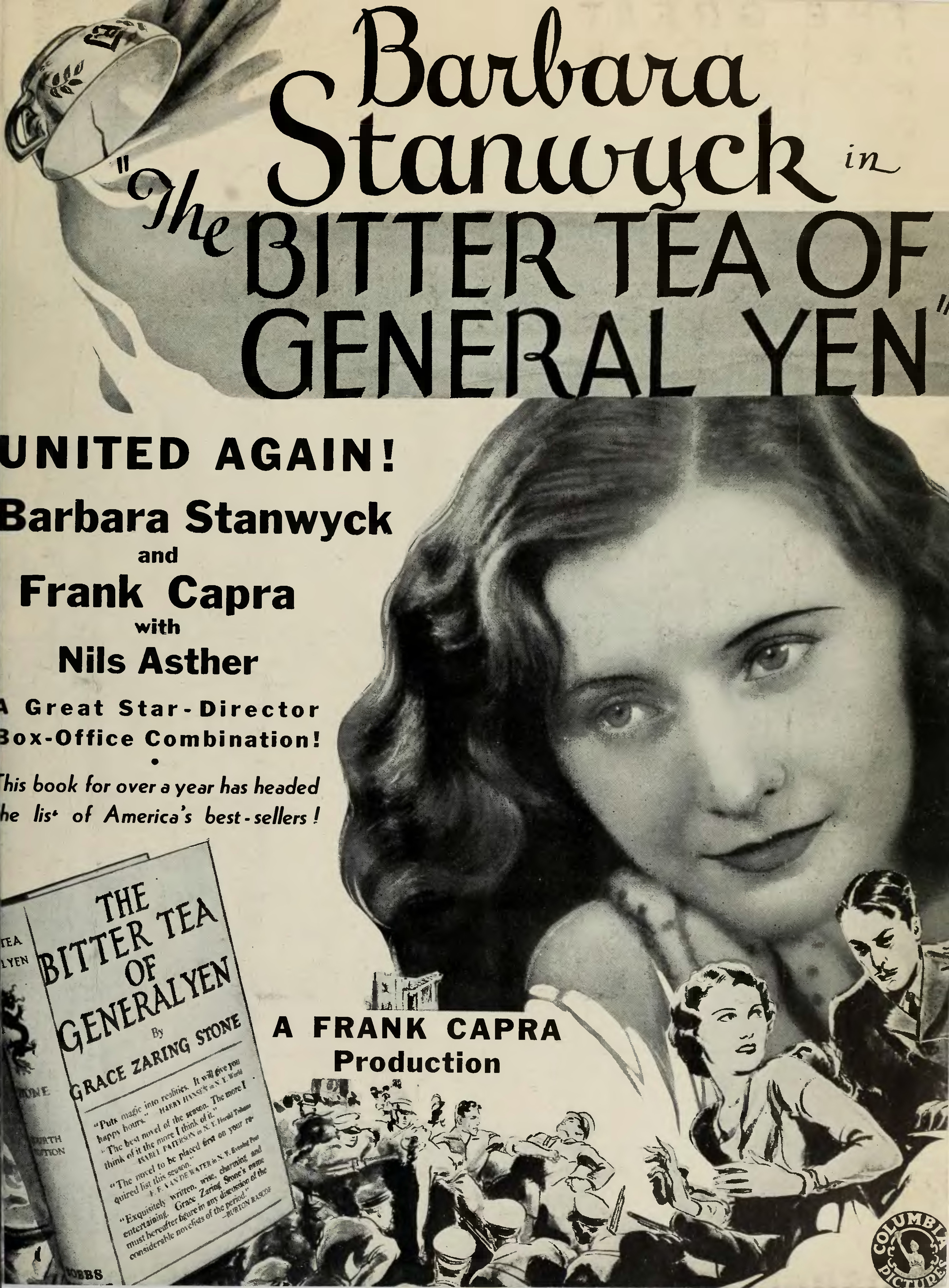
The Bitter Tea of General Yen ad from The Film Daily, 1932

The film is based on Grace Zaring Stone's 1930 novel of the same name. Stone wrote the book while living in China while her husband, Captain Ellis Stone, commanded the USS Isabel as it patrolled the Yangtze River. The novel is not about a romance between Megan and General Yen but rather concerns a philosophical contest between Megan's Christian worldview and Yen's "elegant, educated, wise, unsentimental" philosophy. The novel's Megan claims she wants to understand Yen. But when Megan pleads for Yen to spare Mah-Li and save his soul, Yen accuses Megan of wanting to change him. Screenwriter Edward Paramore jettisoned the philosophical nature of the hit novel and replaced it with a tale about a sheltered white woman who succumbs to the sensual nature of an exotic Asian.

Director Frank Capra bluntly informed Columbia Pictures' head Harry Cohn that he wanted to win an Academy Award nomination. Cohn told him that only "arty" films were nominated. Capra cast about for a novel that fit the genre, and chose Stone's The Bitter Tea of General Yen.

The film is one of the few Capra films which uses directorial flair and photographic tricks. Capra had the film shot with a silk stocking over the lens to give the picture a diffused, romantic look. When a clearer image of an individual was needed, a cigarette was used to burn a hole in the stocking. Unlike most Capra films, it contains a surrealistic dream sequence and a notable (for being so unusual for Capra) scene in which an optical printer is used to superimpose images of riots over Megan's face to make her emotional confusion seem more palpable.

Capra believed The Bitter Tea of General Yen was a "women's picture". He asked 65 stenographers at the studio to vote for their favorite actor, and by a three-to-one margin they chose Nils Asther for the lead in the film. For the role of Megan Davis, Capra cast Barbara Stanwyck. Capra considered her an outstanding actress, and Bitter Tea was the fourth film they did together. Capra also chose Stanwyck, she says, because he believed she needed to be glamorous after having played penniless or dowdy characters in all her prior films. Capra refused to rehearse Stanwyck. Having worked with her before, he believed she delivered her best performance on the first take. Therefore, Capra rehearsed his other cast together first, then had Stanwyck step in and do her scene with them before the camera. Stanwyck's wardrobe was designed by Robert Kalloch and Edward Stevenson.

With a budget of $1 million, the film had one of the smallest budgets Capra ever worked with.

== Reception ==
In his memoir, Capra recalls that "it was chosen as the film to open Radio City Music Hall." It was scheduled for a two-week run but the theater yanked it after eight days and $80,000 in grosses, despite the certainty of a loss on its rental fee. Stanwyck blamed its poor box-office showing on racist backlash.

The New York Times reviewer Mordaunt Hall said it was "a handsomely mounted affair with conspicuously good portrayals by Nils Asther and Walter Connolly...It is a story that is scarcely plausible but which has the saving grace of being fairly entertaining." According to Time magazine, "Stanwyck is satisfactory ... but the most noteworthy female member of the cast is Toshia Mori, a sloe-eyed Japanese girl."

Upon release, the British Board of Censors required cuts before they approved the film. When Columbia Pictures sought to reissue the film in 1950, the Production Code Administration was adamant that its characterizations of Americans and Chinese and a scene in which the heroine offered herself to the general were both "very questionable", and the film was not rereleased.

The film has produced different viewpoints in recent years. Kevin Lee, writing in Senses of Cinema, notes that with changes in racial and sexual conventions, film scholars have objected to its Orientalism and white actors portraying Asian characters. Lee grants these objections but argues that for "those who are willing to plough beyond these surface reactions, what's left is a film that weaves an elaborate web out of competing cultural perceptions, social and religious values, and sexual desires." What Lee finds of value is that the film "risks offence for the sake of constructing a dialogue, one fraught with so many perils in the realms of politics, religion, cultures and sex, that it would not be worth it if it weren’t necessary."

On Rotten Tomatoes, the film holds a rating of 86% from 59 reviews with the consensus: "Expertly brewed by director Frank Capra, The Bitter Tea of General Yen offers an engaging account of forbidden love during dangerous times."
