= Earl Dwire =

American actor

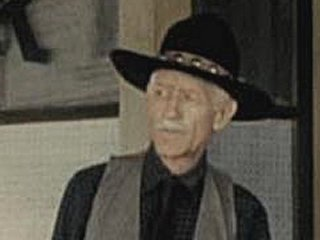
- Dwire in The Lucky Texan (1934)
- Born: Earl Dean Dwire; October 3, 1883
- Died: January 16, 1940 (aged 56)
- Occupation: Actor
- Years active: 1909-1940
- Spouses: Ruth Dwire; Elizabeth Alice Maddeaux (m. 1923)

Earl Dwire (October 3, 1883 – January 16, 1940), born Earl Dean Dwire, was an American character actor who appeared in more than 150 movies between 1921 and his death in 1940.

== Biography ==
Dwire acted for three years in stock theater with companies in Portland and Seattle. In December 1912, he joined the American Theater company in Spokane, Washington, and shortly after was named the company's manager when the previous manager resigned. In 1921, he acted with, and was the director of, the Wright Players.

Dwire worked mainly as a villain in westerns, including Riders of Destiny (1933) with John Wayne in the first singing cowboy movie and The Trail Beyond (1934) opposite Wayne, Noah Beery, Sr., and Noah Beery, Jr. He acted with John Wayne and Gabby Hayes in The Lawless Frontier (1934). He also appeared in Bob Steele vehicles such as Alias John Law (1935). He was a family friend of Bob Steele and his Dad, Robert North Bradbury.

== Selected filmography ==
- The Kingfisher's Roost (1921) - Dave Butler (the Grocer)
- Dugan of the Badlands (1931) - Lang
- Alias – the Bad Man (1931) - Townsman (uncredited)
- The Montana Kid (1931) - Deputy (uncredited)
- Oklahoma Jim (1931) - Cavalry Sergeant
- Ghost City (1932) - Barfly (uncredited)
- Law of the West (1932) - Henchman Butch
- Tangled Fortunes (1932) - Townsman (uncredited)
- Riders of the Desert (1932) - Bill - A Ranger (uncredited)
- The Man from Hell's Edges (1932) - Morgan - Henchman
- Mason of the Mounted (1932) - Henchman Dwire (uncredited)
- Law of the North (1932) - Deputy (uncredited)
- Honor of the Mounted (1932) - Deputy (uncredited)
- Son of Oklahoma (1932) - Ray Brent
- Klondike (1932) - Jury Foreman (uncredited)
- Broadway to Cheyenne (1932) - Cattleman
- Hidden Valley (1932) - Prosecuting Attorney (uncredited)
- Texas Buddies (1932) - Hank, the Liveryman (uncredited)
- Young Blood (1932) - Clearwater Station Agent (uncredited)
- King Kong (1933) - New York Theatregoer (uncredited)
- The Fugitive (1933) - Henchman Spike
- Rainbow Ranch (1933) - Earl - Deputy (uncredited)
- Galloping Romeo (1933) - Pete Manning - Express Agent
- Her Forgotten Past (1933) - Henchman (uncredited)
- Riders of Destiny (1933) - Slip Morgan
- The Lucky Texan (1934) - Sheriff Miller
- West of the Divide (1934) - Sheriff
- Blue Steel (1934) - Henchman
- The Man from Utah (1934) - Rodeo Announcer (uncredited)
- Randy Rides Alone (1934) - Sheriff
- Young Eagles (1934, Serial) - William Thayer [Ch. 3] (uncredited)
- The Star Packer (1934) - Henchman Mason
- The Tonto Kid (1934) - Deputy George (uncredited)
- Fighting Through (1934) - Barfly (uncredited)
- The Dude Ranger (1934) - Train Passenger (uncredited)
- The Trail Beyond (1934) - Henchman Benoit
- The Lawless Frontier (1934) - Pandro Zanti Posing as Don Yorba
- 'Neath the Arizona Skies (1934) - Tom (Nina's Father) (uncredited)
- Western Justice (1934) - Doctor (uncredited)
- Unconquered Bandit (1935) - Pedro Gonzales
- Wolf Riders (1935) - Red Wolf
- Big Calibre (1935) - Sheriff of Gladstone
- Born to Battle (1935) - George Powell
- The Pecos Kid (1935) - Jose
- Smokey Smith (1935) - Sheriff
- Wagon Trail (1935) - Deputy Joe Larkin
- The Miracle Rider (1935) - Indian Scout - Prologue (uncredited)
- Tombstone Terror (1935) - Regan
- Social Error (1935) - Mr. Merton
- Toll of the Desert (1935) - Joe Carson
- Fighting Pioneers (1935) - Sergeant Luke
- The New Adventures of Tarzan (1935, Serial) - Expatriate Scientist [Chs. 8-10] (uncredited)
- Justice of the Range (1935) - Townsman (uncredited)
- Saddle Aces (1935) - Sloan aka El Canejo
- The Dawn Rider (1935) - Pete (Expressman)
- Danger Ahead (1935) - Detective Sergeant
- Paradise Canyon (1935) - Sheriff #2 - Arizona (uncredited)
- Sundown Saunders (1935) - Sheriff Baker
- Westward Ho (1935) - Townsman Notifying Vigilantes (uncredited)
- No Man's Range (1935) - Phony Ed Oliver
- Cappy Ricks Returns (1935) - Spy in Office (uncredited)
- Confidential (1935) - Secretary (uncredited)
- The Rider of the Law (1935) - Razor Tolliver
- The New Frontier (1935) - Pat Miller (uncredited)
- Between Men (1935) - Trent
- Lawless Range (1935) - Emmett
- Alias John Law (1935) - The Kootney Kid
- The Last of the Clintons (1935) - Pete - Henchman
- The Courageous Avenger (1935) - Prisoner
- The Fighting Coward (1935) - Police Chief John Russell
- Step on It (1936) - Frank Banning
- The Kid Ranger (1936) - Steve Brent
- Ghost Town (1936) - Jim McCall
- Ridin' On (1936) - Buck O'Nell
- King of the Pecos (1936) - Rancher (uncredited)
- Wildcat Saunders (1936) - Steve - Henchman (uncredited)
- King of the Pecos (1936) - Rancher (uncredited)
- The Millionaire Kid (1936) - Black
- Caryl of the Mountains (1936) - Captain Bradshaw
- Desert Justice (1936) - Hansen - Police Commissioner
- Roamin' Wild (1936) - Jim Madison
- The Speed Reporter (1936) - Publisher John Parker
- Pinto Rustlers (1936) - Bud Walton
- Gun Grit (1936) - Uncle Joe Hess
- The Rogues' Tavern (1936) - Morgan
- The Crooked Trail (1936) - Miner (uncredited)
- Idaho Kid (1936) - Clint Hollister
- Santa Fe Bound (1936) - Tibbets
- Oh, Susanna! (1936) - Excited Sage City Townsman (uncredited)
- Tundra (1936) - Trading Post Keeper
- Cavalcade of the West (1936) - George Christman
- Cavalry (1936) - Raid Leader (uncredited)
- Law and Lead (1936) - Dad Hawley
- The Gun Ranger (1936) - Bud Cooper
- Song of the Gringo (1936) - The Chief (uncredited)
- Career Woman (1936) - Townsman (uncredited)
- Stormy Trails (1936) - Lawyer Steve Barick
- Arizona Days (1937) - Joe Workman
- The Great O'Malley (1937) - First Judge (uncredited)
- The Gambling Terror (1937) - Homer Bradley
- Two Wise Maids (1937) - Minor Role (uncredited)
- Paradise Express (1937) - Townsman in Café (uncredited)
- Trouble in Texas (1937) - Barker
- Git Along Little Dogies (1937) - Townsman (uncredited)
- Lightnin' Crandall (1937) - Parson Durkin
- The Man Who Found Himself (1937) - Joe, the Train Dispatcher (uncredited)
- Hittin' the Trail (1937) - James Clark
- The Trusted Outlaw (1937) - Jim Swain
- Fly-Away Baby (1937) - Globe Chop House Waiter (uncredited)
- Riders of the Rockies (1937) - Jeff Jeffries
- Doomed at Sundown (1937) - Butch Brawley
- Galloping Dynamite (1937) - Pop
- Empty Holsters (1937) - Doc Eagan
- Riders of the Dawn (1937) - Two-Gun Gardner
- They Won't Forget (1937) - Jury Foreman (uncredited)
- The Toast of New York (1937) - Member of the Board of Directors (uncredited)
- The Mystery of the Hooded Horsemen (1937) - Sheriff Walker
- Atlantic Flight (1937) - Dr. Harvey (uncredited)
- Varsity Show (1937) - Professor (uncredited)
- Radio Patrol (1937, Serial) - Jeremiah Crockett
- Alcatraz Island (1937) - Third Trial Judge Robert Tremaine (uncredited)
- Trouble at Midnight (1937) - Henry Goff
- Danger Valley (1937) - Hardrock
- Born to the West (1937) - Cowhand (uncredited)
- Young Dynamite (1937) - Finnegan
- Romance of the Rockies (1937) - Henchman Trigger
- The Purple Vigilantes (1938) - David Ross
- The Old Barn Dance (1938) - Clem Handley
- Daredevil Drivers (1938) - Mr. Perkins
- Assassin of Youth (1938) - Henry 'Pop' Brady
- Accidents Will Happen (1938) - Dr. Faris
- Outlaws of Sonora (1938) - Jake, the Banker (uncredited)
- Under Western Stars (1938) - Mayor Biggs
- Two Gun Justice (1938) - Old-Timer
- Six Shootin' Sheriff (1938) - Wild Bill Holman
- The Great Adventures of Wild Bill Hickok (1938, Serial) - Jenkins (Ch. 1) (uncredited)
- Gold Mine in the Sky (1938) - Station Agent (uncredited)
- The Amazing Dr. Clitterhouse (1938) - Surgeon (uncredited)
- The Man from Music Mountain (1938) - Martin
- The Mysterious Rider (1938) - Sheriff Burley
- Six-Gun Trail (1938) - Henchman, stock footage (uncredited)
- Angels with Dirty Faces (1938) - Priest (uncredited)
- Devil's Island (1939) - Priest (uncredited)
- Lincoln in the White House (1939, Short) - (uncredited)
- The Oklahoma Kid (1939) - Relay Station Man (uncredited)
- Southward Ho (1939) - Dan - Wounded Storekeeper (uncredited)
- On Trial (1939) - Judge
- Timber Stampede (1939) - Henry Clay Baylor
- The Star Maker (1939) - Mac, the Accountant
- The Arizona Kid (1939) - Dr. Jason Radford
- Pride of the Blue Grass (1939) - Dr. Holmes (uncredited)
- Private Detective (1939) - Justice of the Peace (scenes deleted)
- His Girl Friday (1940) - Pete Davis (uncredited)
- Granny Get Your Gun (1940) - Jake - Checkers Player (uncredited)
- Flash Gordon Conquers the Universe (1940, Serial) - Janda [Ch. 1]
- King of the Lumberjacks (1940) - Dr. Vance (final film role)
