= Ranger's Code =

1933 American film directed by Robert North Bradbury

- Theatrical release poster
- Directed by: Robert North Bradbury
- Screenplay by: Harry L. Fraser
- Story by: John T. Neville
- Produced by: Trem Carr
- Starring: Bob Steele; Doris Hill; Ernie Adams; George Nash; Ed Brady; George "Gabby" Hayes
- Cinematography: Archie Stout
- Edited by: Carl Pierson
- Production company: Monogram Pictures
- Distributed by: Monogram Pictures
- Release date: August 15, 1933
- Running time: 59 minutes
- Country: United States
- Language: English

Ranger's Code is a 1933 American Western film directed by Robert North Bradbury and written by Harry L. Fraser. The film stars Bob Steele, Doris Hill, Ernie Adams, George Nash, Ed Brady and George "Gabby" Hayes. The film was released on August 15, 1933, by Monogram Pictures.

== Cast ==
- Bob Steele as Bob Baxter
- Doris Hill as Mary Clayton
- Ernie Adams as Nat the Bat
- George Nash as Danny Clayton
- Ed Brady as Bert
- George "Gabby" Hayes as Baxter
- Hal Price as Sheriff
- Dick Dickinson as Henchman
- Frank Ball as Rancher
