= A Son of the Plains =

1931 film directed by Robert N. Bradbury

- Directed by: Robert N. Bradbury
- Written by: Robert N. Bradbury
- Produced by: Trem Carr; Paul Malvern; W. Ray Johnston
- Starring: Bob Custer; Doris Phillips; J.P. McGowan
- Cinematography: Archie Stout
- Edited by: Robert Jahns
- Production company: Trem Carr Pictures
- Distributed by: Syndicate Pictures
- Release date: July 5, 1931
- Running time: 59 minutes
- Country: United States
- Language: English

A Son of the Plains is a 1931 American Western film directed by Robert N. Bradbury and starring Bob Custer, Doris Phillips and J.P. McGowan.

== Main cast ==
- Bob Custer as Deputy Bob Brent
- Doris Phillips as Ann Farrell
- J.P. McGowan as Dan Farrell
- Edward Hearn as Buck Brokaw
- Eve Humes as Roxy
- Gordon De Main as Sheriff Matt Woods
- Al St. John as Saloon Drunk

== Plot ==
A sheriff's deputy (Brent) mistakenly believes that his fiancee's father (Dan Farrell) is a bandit. The truth emerges after the real bandit (Brokaw) and his partner arrive.

== Bibliography ==
- Michael R. Pitts. Poverty Row Studios, 1929–1940: An Illustrated History of 55 Independent Film Companies, with a Filmography for Each. McFarland & Company, 2005.
