= Looking for Trouble =

Looking for Trouble may refer to:

- Looking for Trouble (1926 film), an American silent Western film
- Looking for Trouble (1934 film), an American crime film
- Looking for Trouble, a 1941 memoir by Virginia Cowles
- "Looking for Trouble", a song by Kanye West from the J. Cole mixtape Friday Night Lights
- "Looking For Trouble", a storyline in the science fiction comedy webtoon series Live with Yourself!
