= Paul Malvern =

American actor

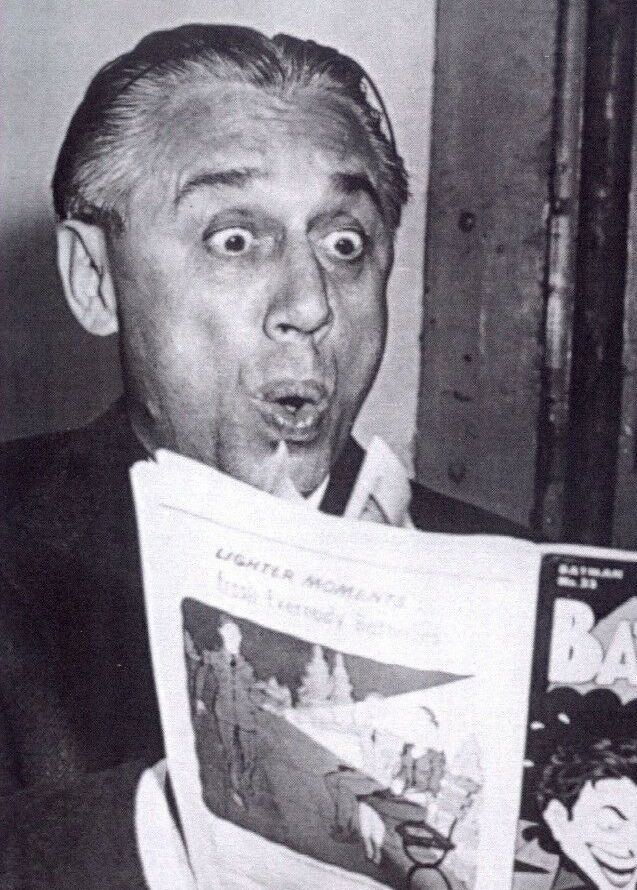
- Malvern in 1944
- Born: June 28, 1902; Portland, Oregon, U.S.
- Died: May 29, 1993 (aged 90); Los Angeles, California, U.S.
- Resting place: Hollywood Forever Cemetery
- Occupations: Stuntman; producer; actor
- Spouse: Jean Huntley (m. 1932; died 1979)

Paul William Malvern (June 28, 1902 – May 29, 1993) was an American film producer, child actor and stuntman who produced more than 100 films.

He began his career as a child acrobat and later worked as a stunt man before transitioning to an assistant director role.

Some of his productions were Westerns released by Monogram Pictures under Malvern's Lonestar Productions label, including many starring John Wayne.

== Biography ==
Malvern was born June 28, 1902 in Portland, Oregon. He began his career as a member of his family's acrobatic troupe and performed in vaudeville beginning at age four, when he was touted as "the greatest child acrobat on the American stage." His family's troupe toured internationally, performing as a featured act with the Ringling Brothers circus.

In Los Angeles, Malvern's first work in film came as a double for Mary Pickford, and he soon began performing stunts. His first major stunt appearance was doubling for Eileen Sedgwick in Beasts of Paradise (1923). In 1928, Malvern suffered serious injuries in a 70 feet (21 m) fall, and he retired from stunt performing, subsequently working as a producer for Universal Pictures and Monogram. Malvern married his wife Jean Huntley in 1932 and remained with her until her death in 1979.

== Death ==
Malvern died on May 29, 1993 at his home in North Hollywood, Los Angeles. He is interred at the Hollywood Forever Cemetery.

== Select filmography ==
- Riders of Destiny (1933)
- The Fugitive (1933)
- Sagebrush Trail (1933)
- West of the Divide (1933)
- The Lucky Texan (1934)
- Randy Rides Alone (1934)
- The Star Packer (1934)
- The Trail Beyond (1934)
- 'Neath the Arizona Skies (1934)
- The Lawless Frontier (1934)
- The Dawn Rider (1935)
- Paradise Canyon (1935)
- The Man from Utah (1934)
- Blue Steel (1934)
- Texas Terror (1935)
- Rainbow Valley (1935)
- The Desert Trail (1935)
- Westward Ho (1935)
- Wolf Call (1939)
- North to the Klondike (1942)
- House of Frankenstein (1944)
- Ali Baba and the 40 Thieves (1944)

| Year | Title | Role | Notes | Ref. |
|---|---|---|---|---|
| 1924 | The Thief of Bagdad | Gigantic Bat | Uncredited | |
| 1927 | Gun-Hand Garrison | | | |
| 1928 | Trail Riders | | | |
| 1928 | The Chinatown Mystery | | | |
| 1929 | Two Sisters | — | Producer | |
| 1934 | The Star Packer | — | Producer | |
| 1934 | Tailspin Tommy | — | Producer | |
| 1941 | Sign of the Wolf | — | Producer | |
| 1945 | Sudan | — | Producer | |
| 1945 | House of Dracula | — | Producer | |
| 1950 | Rock Island Trail | — | Producer | |
| 1980 | Hazard of the Game | | | |

== See also ==
- Robert North Bradbury

== Sources ==
- Freese, Gene Scott (2014). Hollywood Stunt Performers, 1910s-1970s: A Biographical Dictionary (2nd ed.). Jefferson, North Carolina: McFarland. ISBN 978-0-786-47643-5.
- Katchmer, George A. (2015). A Biographical Dictionary of Silent Film Western Actors and Actresses. Jefferson, North Carolina: McFarland. ISBN 978-1-476-60905-8.
- McGowan, John J. (2005). J.P. McGowan: Biography of a Hollywood Pioneer. Jefferson, North Carolina: McFarland. ISBN 978-0-786-41994-4.
- Rainey, Buck (2004). The Strong, Silent Type: Over 100 Screen Cowboys, 1903-1930. Jefferson, North Carolina: McFarland. ISBN 978-0-786-41286-0.
- Stephens, E. J.; Stephens, Kim (2017). Legends of Hollywood Forever Cemetery. Charleston, South Carolina: Arcadia Publishing. ISBN 978-1-439-66142-0.
- Vance, Jeffrey; Maietta, Tony (2008). Douglas Fairbanks. Los Angeles, California: University of California Press. ISBN 978-0-520-25667-5.
