= Dugan of the Badlands =

1931 film

- Theatrical release poster
- Directed by: Robert North Bradbury
- Screenplay by: Robert North Bradbury
- Produced by: Trem Carr
- Starring: Bill Cody; Andy Shuford
- Cinematography: Archie Stout
- Edited by: J.S. Harrington
- Production company: Monogram Pictures
- Distributed by: Monogram Pictures
- Release date: June 24, 1931
- Running time: 56 minutes
- Country: United States
- Language: English

Dugan of the Badlands is a 1931 American Western film written and directed by Robert North Bradbury. The film stars Bill Cody and Andy Shuford. It was released on June 24, 1931, by Monogram Pictures.

== Plot ==
Bill Dugan takes charge of a boy after his father (who was Dugan's friend) dies. They become involved with solving the murder of a sheriff, eventually revealing his deputy as the murderer.

== Cast ==
- Bill Cody as Bill Dugan
- Andy Shuford as Andy
- Blanche Mehaffey as June Manning
- Ethan Laidlaw as Dan Kirk
- Julian Rivero as Pedro
- Earl Dwire as Lang
- John Elliott as Sheriff Manning
