= The Gallant Fool (1933 film) =

1933 film

- Film poster
- Directed by: Robert N. Bradbury
- Written by: Harry L. Fraser; John P. McCarthy; Robert N. Bradbury
- Produced by: Paul Malvern; Trem Carr
- Starring: Bob Steele; Arletta Duncan; George 'Gabby' Hayes
- Cinematography: Faxon M. Dean
- Edited by: Carl Pierson
- Production company: Paul Malvern Productions
- Distributed by: Monogram Pictures
- Release date: May 23, 1933
- Running time: 60 minutes
- Country: United States
- Language: English

The Gallant Fool is a 1933 American Western film directed by Robert N. Bradbury and starring Bob Steele, Arletta Duncan and George 'Gabby' Hayes.

== Cast ==
- Bob Steele as Kit Denton
- Arletta Duncan as Alecia Russo
- George 'Gabby' Hayes as Dad Denton
- Theodore Lorch as Rainey
- John Elliott as Chris McDonald
- Perry Murdock as Connors - Henchman
- Pascale Perry as Jim Leyton
- George Nash as Foils Pickpocket
