= Texas Buddies =

1932 film

- Theatrical release poster
- Directed by: Robert North Bradbury
- Screenplay by: Robert North Bradbury
- Produced by: Trem Carr
- Starring: Bob Steele; Nancy Drexel; Francis McDonald; Harry Semels; George "Gabby" Hayes; William Dyer
- Cinematography: Archie Stout
- Edited by: Carl Pierson
- Production company: Trem Carr Pictures
- Distributed by: Sono Art-World Wide Pictures
- Release date: October 19, 1932
- Running time: 59 minutes
- Country: United States
- Language: English

Texas Buddies is a 1932 American Western film written and directed by Robert North Bradbury. The film stars Bob Steele, Nancy Drexel, Francis McDonald, Harry Semels, George "Gabby" Hayes and William Dyer. The film was released on October 19, 1932, by Sono Art-World Wide Pictures.

== Plot ==
1919: Ted Garner is just returned from overseas service with the United States Army Air Service, too late for World War I flying. His friend Si Haller informs him that his Aunt who raised him has died, his land his gone, his girl has married someone else and his horse has been sold to Ken Kincaid.

Driving through the desert, they view an airplane in trouble that comes down in a forced landing. Unknown to the pilot and his passenger June Collins, their plane has been sabotaged in order to rob the money they are carrying. Both the pilot and the passenger are wounded by an attempted robbery that Ted and Si thwart with their six guns. They also discover that June's uncle has been murdered. As June as never met him, Ted talks Si into impersonating him as June recovers.

Ted wins his land and horse back in gambling, then goes after Kincaid.

== Cast ==
- Bob Steele as Ted Garner
- Nancy Drexel as June Collins
- Francis McDonald as Blake
- Harry Semels as Ken Kincaid
- George "Gabby" Hayes as Si Haller
- William Dyer as Sheriff
- Dick Dickinson as Burns
- Slade Hurlbert as Buck Gregg
