= The Courageous Avenger =

1935 film

- Theatrical release poster
- Directed by: Robert N. Bradbury
- Written by: Charles F. Royal (story and screenplay)
- Produced by: A.W. Hackel (producer) (uncredited)
- Starring: See below
- Edited by: S. Roy Luby
- Release date: 1935
- Running time: 58 minutes
- Country: United States
- Language: English

The Courageous Avenger is a 1935 American Western film directed by Robert N. Bradbury.

== Plot ==
Gold shipments from the Davis Mine are repeatedly hijacked by a gang led by Gorman. Despite the sheriff’s efforts, the gang’s desert hideout remains undiscovered.

Lawman Kirk Baxter is assigned to investigate. His sweetheart, Betty Stonewell, is the stepdaughter of Carson, the mine superintendent, who is secretly working with Gorman by alerting the gang to shipment schedules. When Kirk witnesses Carson mistreating Betty, he intervenes and arranges for her to leave town. However, her stagecoach is ambushed, and she is kidnapped by the gang.

Tracking the outlaws, Kirk infiltrates their hideout and initially deceives Gorman into believing he is a recruit. However, his identity is soon exposed, and he is imprisoned with other kidnapped laborers forced to work in a silver mine. Meanwhile, Gorman prepares to rob another gold shipment.

Kirk escapes, frees the captives, including Betty, and arrives just in time to stop the heist. As the sheriff and his posse arrive, Kirk chases down Gorman and captures him, bringing an end to the gang’s crimes.

== Cast ==
- Johnny Mack Brown as Kirk Baxter
- Helen Ericson as Beth Stonewell
- Warner Richmond as Gorman
- Eddie Parker as Henchman Wellford
- Ed Cassidy as Mr. Carson
- Frank Ball as M.H. Davis
- Forrest Taylor as Marshal Taggart
- Earl Dwire as Prisoner
