= Sundown Saunders =

1935 film

- Theatrical release poster
- Directed by: Robert N. Bradbury
- Written by: Robert N. Bradbury
- Produced by: A. W. Hackel
- Starring: See below
- Cinematography: Bert Longenecker
- Edited by: S. Roy Luby
- Release date: 1935
- Running time: 59 minutes
- Country: United States
- Language: English

Sundown Saunders is a 1935 American Western film directed by Robert N. Bradbury.

== Cast ==
- Bob Steele as Jim "Sundown" Saunders
- Catherine Cotter as Bess Preston
- Earl Dwire as Sheriff Baker
- Ed Cassidy as Taggart
- Jack Rockwell as Preston, Bess' Father
- Milburn Morante as Smokey, Sundown's Sidekick
- Frank Ball as Old Sour Face Manning
- Hal Price as Lewis the Gambler

== Critical reception ==
Variety described the film as "insignificant western fare for multiple bill secondary spots." It wrote, "This cactus quickie succeeds in being interesting in the face of fundamental weaknesses, outstanding being shouldering of original writing, film scripting and directing on one man. Sometimes such arrangement works, but seldom. In this case, Robert N. Bradbury forgets his directorial duties for his script and then again he bears down on direction and tosses continuity to the winds." The review considered that the majority of the cast performed satisfactorily despite dialogue "so simple it weights story" but determined that Catherine Cotter "is too saccharine and routine as the heroine."

== See also ==
- Bob Steele filmography
