= Gallopin' Through =

1923 film

- Directed by: Robert N. Bradbury
- Written by: William Berke; Robert N. Bradbury
- Produced by: Anthony J. Xydias
- Starring: Jack Hoxie; Priscilla Bonner; Doreen Turner
- Cinematography: Bert Longenecker
- Production company: Sunset Productions
- Distributed by: Aywon Film Corporation
- Release date: March 15, 1923
- Running time: 50 minutes
- Country: United States
- Languages: Silent; English intertitles

Gallopin' Through is a lost 1923 American silent Western film directed by Robert N. Bradbury and starring Jack Hoxie, Priscilla Bonner and Doreen Turner.

== Cast ==
- Jack Hoxie as Jack Hoxie
- Priscilla Bonner as Bert Wayne's Wife
- Doreen Turner as Bert Wayne's Child
- Scout the Horse as Scout - Jack's Horse
- Bunk the Dog as Bunk - Jack's Dog

== Preservation ==
With no holdings located in archives, Gallopin' Through is considered a lost film.
