= Between Men (1935 film) =

1935 film directed by Robert N. Bradbury

- Original film poster
- Directed by: Robert N. Bradbury
- Written by: Robert N. Bradbury; Charles F. Royal (adaptation)
- Produced by: A.W. Hackel
- Starring: Johnny Mack Brown
- Cinematography: Bert Longenecker
- Edited by: S. Roy Luby
- Production company: Supreme Pictures Corporation
- Release date: October 29, 1935
- Running time: 60 minutes
- Country: United States
- Language: English

Between Men is a 1935 American Western film directed by Robert N. Bradbury who also provided the original story. Produced by A.W. Hackel's Supreme Pictures, it stars Johnny Mack Brown in his second film for the studio.

== Plot ==
Widowed blacksmith John Wellington defends the elderly Sir George Thorne from three thugs by beating up the trio. In revenge, one of the thugs shoots Wellington's only child. Thinking his son dead, Wellington pursues and shoots down the three thugs then escapes Virginia as a fugitive wanted for murder.

Unknown to Wellington, his son survives the bullet wound. Raised as his own son by Sir George, Sir George wishes to leave his entire estate to John Wellington Junior, however young Johnny wishes to locate and return Sir George's surviving granddaughter who is somewhere in New Mexico.

== Cast ==
- Johnny Mack Brown as Johnny Wellington Jr.
- Beth Marion as Gail Winters
- William Farnum as John Wellington/Rand
- Earl Dwire as Trent
- Lloyd Ingraham as Sir George Thorne
- Forrest Taylor as Wyndham the Lawyer
