= Hidden Loot =

1925 film

- Directed by: Robert North Bradbury
- Screenplay by: Harry Dittmar
- Story by: William J. Neidig
- Starring: Jack Hoxie; Olive Hasbrouck; Edward Cecil; Jack Kenny; Buck Connors; Bert De Marc
- Cinematography: William Nobles
- Production company: Universal Pictures
- Distributed by: Universal Pictures
- Release date: October 31, 1925
- Running time: 50 minutes
- Country: United States
- Languages: Silent; English intertitles

Hidden Loot is a 1925 American silent Western film directed by Robert North Bradbury and written by Harry Dittmar. The film stars Jack Hoxie, Olive Hasbrouck, Edward Cecil, Jack Kenny, Buck Connors and Bert De Marc. The film was released on October 31, 1925, by Universal Pictures.

== Cast ==
- Jack Hoxie as Cranner
- Olive Hasbrouck as Anna Jones
- Edward Cecil as Dick Jones
- Jack Kenny as 'Big Bill' Angus
- Buck Connors as Buck
- Bert De Marc as Manning
- Charles Brinley as Jordan
