= Smokey Smith (film) =

1935 film

- Directed by: Robert N. Bradbury
- Written by: Robert N. Bradbury
- Starring: Bob Steele
- Production company: Supreme Pictures Corporation
- Release date: April 2, 1935
- Running time: 57 minutes
- Country: United States
- Language: English

Smokey Smith is a 1935 American Western film directed by Robert N. Bradbury and starring Bob Steele. It was remade in 1950 as Crooked River.

== Plot ==
While traveling west with his parents in a wagon train, young Bob Smith (Bob Steele) survives an outlaw ambush that kills his mother and father and steals a distinctive ring from his father's finger. Left for dead in the desert, he is rescued and nursed back to health by a sheriff and his deputies, who nickname him "Smokey" for his remarkable shooting skills and give him the alias Smokey Smith to help him start anew.

Driven by revenge, Smokey tracks the killers to a ranch run by Blaze Bart (George "Gabby" Hayes), where the outlaws are based. Posing as a wanted man on the run, he infiltrates the gang to identify the member who took the ring and bring them to justice.

As he works undercover amid rustling, holdups, and ranch schemes, Smokey forms bonds (including a romantic interest with Bess Bart, Blaze's daughter), faces suspicions from the gang, and navigates tense confrontations. Through daring shootouts, chases, and clever deduction, he exposes the culprits, recovers the ring as proof, defeats the outlaws, and avenges his parents' murder—earning redemption and a hopeful future in classic Western style.

== Cast ==
- Bob Steele as Smokey Smith
- George 'Gabby' Hayes as Blaze Bart (as George Hayes)
- Mary Kornman as Bess Bart
- Warner Richmond as Kent
- Earl Dwire as Sheriff
- Horace B. Carpenter as Dad Smith (as Horace Carpenter)
- Vane Calvert as Mrs. Smith
