= The Fugitive (1933 film) =

1933 film

- Directed by: Harry L. Fraser
- Written by: Harry L. Fraser
- Produced by: Trem Carr; Paul Malvern
- Starring: Rex Bell; Cecilia Parker; Bob Kortman
- Cinematography: Archie Stout
- Edited by: Carl Pierson
- Music by: Lee Zahler
- Production company: Trem Carr Pictures
- Distributed by: Monogram Pictures
- Release date: July 15, 1933
- Running time: 60 minutes
- Country: United States
- Language: English

The Fugitive is a 1933 American Western film directed by Harry L. Fraser and starring Rex Bell, Cecilia Parker and Bob Kortman.

== Plot ==
When a cowboy is accused of a crime he didn't commit, he must evade capture to set the record straight.

== Cast ==
- Rex Bell as Joe Kean
- Cecilia Parker as Georgia Stevens
- Bob Kortman as Dutch Walton
- George 'Gabby' Hayes as Judge Tyler
- Tom London as om - Foreman
- Gordon De Main as Nicholson
- Theodore Lorch as Parker
- Earl Dwire as Henchman Spike
- George Nash as Kansas

== Bibliography ==
- Pitts, Michael R. Western Movies: A Guide to 5,105 Feature Films. McFarland, 2012.
