= Tombstone Terror =

1935 film

- Directed by: Robert N. Bradbury
- Written by: Perry Murdock
- Starring: Bob Steele
- Production company: Supreme Pictures Corporation
- Release date: April 25, 1935
- Running time: 58 minutes
- Country: United States
- Language: English

Tombstone Terror is a 1935 American Western film directed by Robert N. Bradbury and starring Bob Steele.

== Cast ==
- Bob Steele as Jimmy Dixon / Duke Dixon
- Kay McCoy as Jean Adams
- George 'Gabby' Hayes as Soupy Baxter (as George Hayes)
- Earl Dwire as Regan
- John Elliott as Mr. Dixon
- Hortense Petra as Blondie
- Anne Howard as Nurse Mary (as Ann Howard)
- Nancy Deshon as Millie (as Nancy DeShon)
- Frank McCarroll as Swede
