= The Man from Arizona =

1932 film

- Directed by: Harry L. Fraser
- Written by: Wellyn Totman
- Produced by: Trem Carr
- Starring: Rex Bell; Nat Carr; James Marcus
- Cinematography: Archie Stout
- Edited by: Carl Pierson
- Music by: Lee Zahler
- Production company: Trem Carr Pictures
- Distributed by: Monogram Pictures
- Release date: October 21, 1932
- Running time: 55 minutes
- Country: United States
- Language: English

The Man from Arizona is a 1932 American western film directed by Harry L. Fraser and starring Rex Bell, Nat Carr and James Marcus. It was distributed by Monogram Pictures, which concentrated on second feature westerns and mystery films.

== Plot ==
Kent Rogers saves his friend from a vigilante group who believe he is responsible for an attack on a wagon train. Kent goes after the real gang of bandits in order to clear his friend's name.

== Cast ==
- Rex Bell as Kent Rogers
- Naomi Judge as Lupita
- Nat Carr as Moe Ginsberg
- Lex Lindsay as Jerry Sutton
- James Marcus as Judge McSweeney
- Henry Sedley as Buck Gallagher
- Charles King as Collins
- John Beck as Sheriff Hartman
- Georgie Cooper as Mrs. Sutton
- Theodore Lorch as Bartender

== Bibliography ==
- Pitts, Michael R. Western Movies: A Guide to 5,105 Feature Films. McFarland, 2012.
