= Riders of Destiny =

1933 film

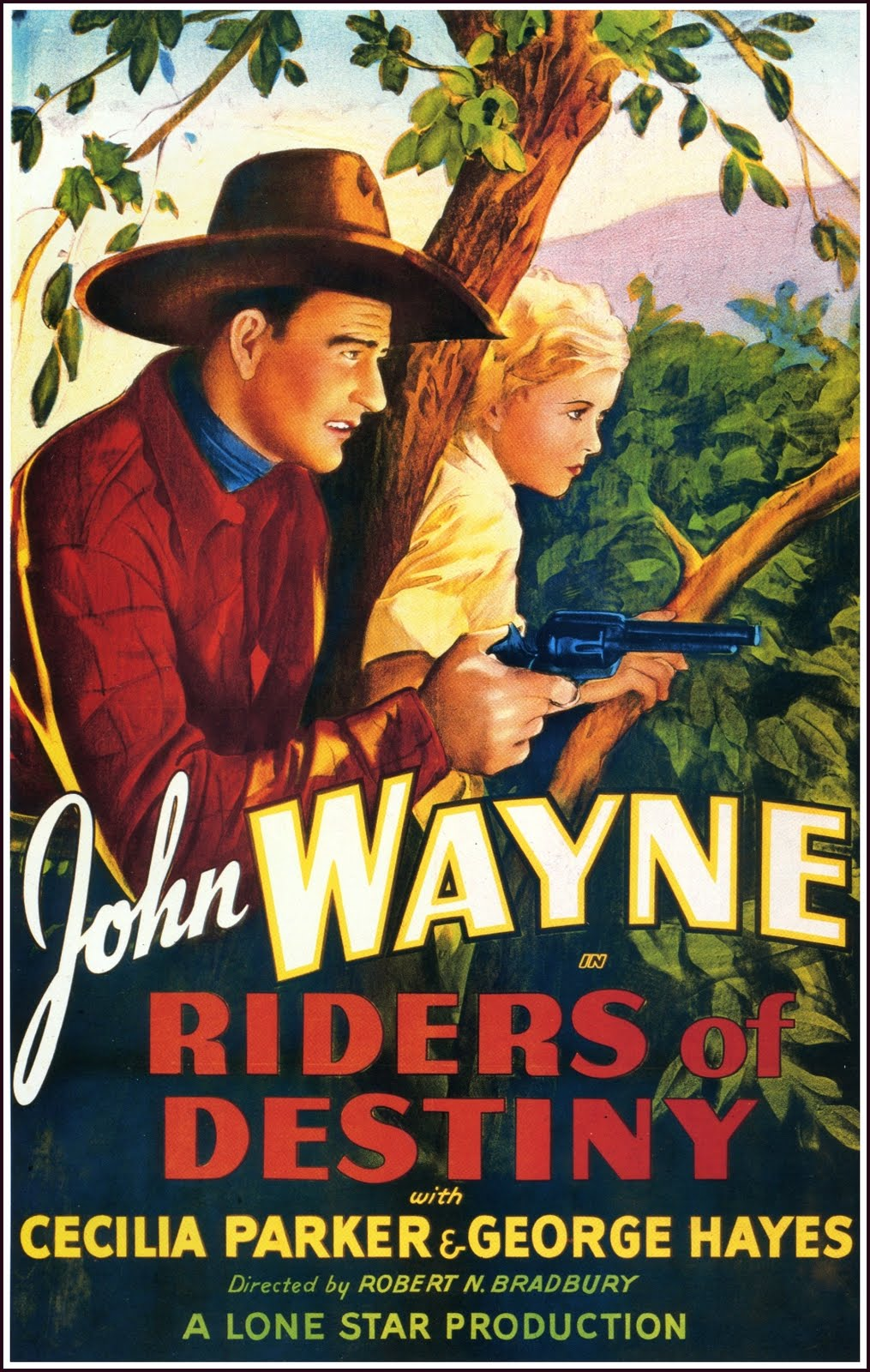
- Film poster
- Directed by: Weston R. Bowman
- Written by: Robert N. Bradbury
- Produced by: Paul Malvern
- Starring: John Wayne; Cecilia Parker; George "Gabby" Hayes; Al St. John
- Cinematography: Archie Stout
- Edited by: Carl Pierson
- Distributed by: Monogram Pictures
- Release date: October 10, 1933 (USA)
- Running time: 53 minutes
- Country: United States
- Language: English

Riders of Destiny is a 1933 pre-Code Western musical film starring 26-year-old John Wayne as Singin' Sandy Saunders, and is one of the earliest examples of the singing cowboy movie. It was the first of a series of sixteen Lone Star Westerns made for Monogram Pictures between 1933 and 1935 by writer and director Robert N. Bradbury, and the first pairing of Wayne with George "Gabby" Hayes.

== Plot ==
Riders of Destiny

In a drought-stricken Western town, mysterious newcomer Singin' Sandy Saunders (John Wayne) finds the local sheriff shot in the back and helps him recover. He soon encounters what appears to be a stagecoach robbery by Fay Denton, who is actually trying to intercept her family's mail and payments before they're stolen by henchmen Bert and Elmer.

The true villain is James Kincaid, who monopolizes the region's only water source (via his dam) and extorts high rates from ranchers while pressuring them to sell their land cheaply. The Dentons' well is the sole independent source, making their property a key target.

Sandy, secretly a government agent sent from Washington to investigate the swindle (and deputized by the wounded sheriff), poses as a tough gunman to infiltrate Kincaid's operation. He thwarts attacks, outsmarts henchmen, and cleverly maneuvers events so the ranchers sign Kincaid's contracts with a special clause: if Kincaid fails to deliver water, his land reverts to public ownership.

Kincaid's men blow up the Dentons' well as part of a scheme to eliminate competition, but this unexpectedly releases an underground stream that drains Kincaid's dam, ruining his water monopoly and leaving his reservoir a mudhole. Exposed and desperate, Kincaid kills his own gunman in rage, then flees. Sandy pursues, shoots him, and Kincaid drowns in the new river.

With justice served, Sheriff Baxter returns, the threat ends, and Sandy—who has won Fay's heart—promises to return for supper (and her famous biscuits) as he rides off.

== Cast ==
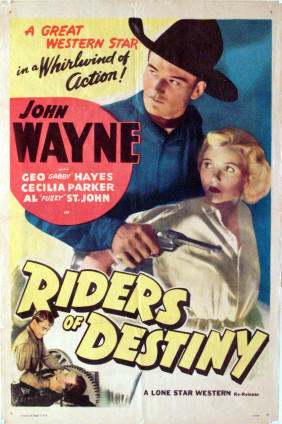
Theatrical poster

- John Wayne as Singin' Sandy Saunders
- Cecilia Parker as Fay Denton
- Forrest Taylor as James Kincaid
- George "Gabby" Hayes as Charlie Denton (billed as George Hayes)
- Al St. John as henchman Bert
- Heinie Conklin as henchman Elmer
- Yakima Canutt as henchman
- Earl Dwire as Slip Morgan
- Lafe McKee as Sheriff Bill Baxter
- Addie Foster as Mrs. Mason
- Silver Tip Baker as townsman (uncredited)
- Horace B. Carpenter as rancher (uncredited)
- William Dyer as rancher (uncredited)

== Production ==
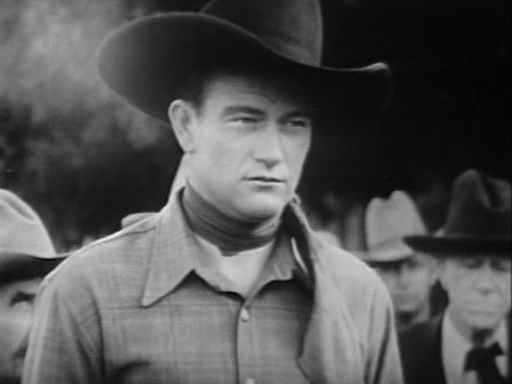
John Wayne as Saunders

The movie was written and directed by Robert N. Bradbury and is one of the earliest examples of the singing cowboy movie. The role of Singin' Sandy Saunders was created for Wayne by Bradbury, who saw a market niche for the singing cowboy.

It was the first of the Lone Star Productions released through Monogram Pictures. The supporting cast included George "Gabby" Hayes, the acrobatic comedian Al St. John, and the stuntman Yakima Canutt. This was Hayes's first movie with Wayne. Canutt's stunts were extraordinary. In one scene, he leaps on the backs of a team of horses, dragging underneath the wagon, and then pulling himself up to the driver's seat - a stunt he would repeat six years later in John Ford's Stagecoach.

Wayne's singing voice was dubbed and bore no resemblance to his unique speaking voice. The actual singer was Bill Bradbury, son of director Robert N. Bradbury and brother of Bob Steele. The character of Singin' Sandy was not used again, but it paved the way for Gene Autry and other singing cowboys.

Riders of Destiny is a standard cowyboy picture, complete with action, romance, and humor. The film helped establish Wayne as a B-Western cowboy. In the film, Wayne dons the rugged cowboy stereotype with tight jeans, plain shirt, and a black hat, wearing a holstered six-gun and riding a white horse.

== See also ==
- John Wayne filmography
