= The Rider of the Law =

1935 film

- Directed by: Robert N. Bradbury
- Written by: Jack Natteford (original story); Jack Natteford (screenplay)
- Produced by: A.W. Hackel (producer)
- Starring: Bob Steele; Gertrude Messinger
- Cinematography: Gus Peterson
- Edited by: S. Roy Luby
- Release date: 1935
- Running time: 59 minutes
- Country: United States
- Language: English

The Rider of the Law is a 1935 American Western film directed by Robert N. Bradbury.

== Cast ==
- Bob Steele as Bob Marlow
- Gertrude Messinger as Ann Carver
- Si Jenks as Buffalo Brady
- Lloyd Ingraham as Colonel Carver
- John Elliott as Town Mayor
- Earl Dwire as Razor Tolliver
- Forrest Taylor as Gambler
- Jack Kirk as Jake Tolliver

== See also ==
- Bob Steele filmography
