= Wolf Tracks (1923 film) =

1923 film

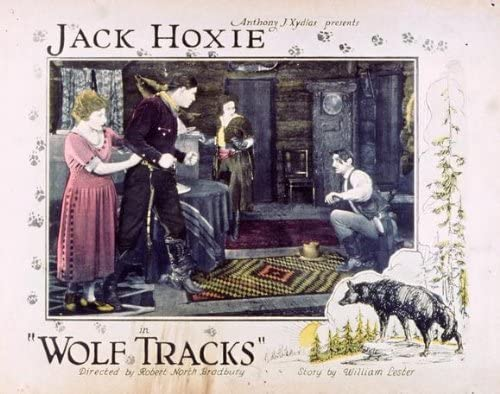
- Directed by: Robert N. Bradbury
- Written by: William Berke
- Produced by: Anthony J. Xydias
- Starring: Jack Hoxie; Andrée Tourneur; Marin Sais
- Cinematography: Bert Longenecker
- Production company: Sunset Productions
- Distributed by: Aywon Film Corporation
- Release date: April 1923
- Running time: 50 minutes
- Country: United States
- Languages: Silent; English intertitles

Wolf Tracks is a 1923 American silent Western film directed by Robert N. Bradbury and starring Jack Hoxie, Andrée Tourneur and Marin Sais.

== Cast ==
- Jack Hoxie as John Hastings
- Andrée Tourneur as Jean Meredith
- Marin Sais as Rose Romaine
- Jim Welch as Bob Meredith
- Albert J. Smith as 'Wolf' Santell
- Thomas G. Lingham as Lemuel Blatherwick
- William Berke as Laroque
- Kate Price as Kitty Blatherwick

== Bibliography ==
- Langman, Larry. A Guide to Silent Westerns. Greenwood Publishing Group, 1992.
