= Forbidden Trails =

1941 film

- Theatrical release poster
- Directed by: Robert N. Bradbury
- Screenplay by: Adele Buffington
- Produced by: Scott R. Dunlap
- Starring: Buck Jones; Tim McCoy; Raymond Hatton; Christine McIntyre; Dave O'Brien; Tris Coffin
- Cinematography: Harry Neumann
- Edited by: Carl Pierson
- Production company: Monogram Pictures
- Distributed by: Monogram Pictures
- Release date: December 25, 1941
- Running time: 54 minutes
- Country: United States
- Language: English

Forbidden Trails is a 1941 American Western film directed by Robert N. Bradbury and written by Adele Buffington. This is the third film in Monogram Pictures' Rough Riders series, and stars Buck Jones as Marshal Buck Roberts, Tim McCoy as Marshal Tim McCall and Raymond Hatton as Marshal Sandy Hopkins, with Christine McIntyre, Dave O'Brien and Tris Coffin. The film was released on December 25, 1941, by Monogram Pictures.

== Plot ==
Two outlaws are released from prison, now they seek revenge on Buck Roberts, the Marshall that had them arrested in the first place. When their attempt on his life fails, Roberts joins up with McCall and Hopkins and goes after the criminals.

== Cast ==
- Buck Jones as Buck Roberts
- Tim McCoy as Tim McCall
- Raymond Hatton as Sandy Hopkins
- Christine McIntyre as Mary Doran
- Dave O'Brien as Jim Cramer
- Tris Coffin as Ed Nelson
- Charles King as Fulton
- Bud Osborne as Joe Howard
- Lynton Brent as Bill Tooley
- Jerry Sheldon as Sam
- Silver as Silver

== Production ==
Forbidden Trails was the third film in Monogram Pictures' Rough Riders series and the last picture made by Robert North Bradbury. Bradbury directed, assisted by Mack V. Wright. The original screenplay was written by Jess Bowers (Adele Buffington). The director of photography was Harry Neumann, and technical director was E. R. Hickson. Sound was by Glen Glenn.
