= Dice of Destiny =

1920 film by Henry King

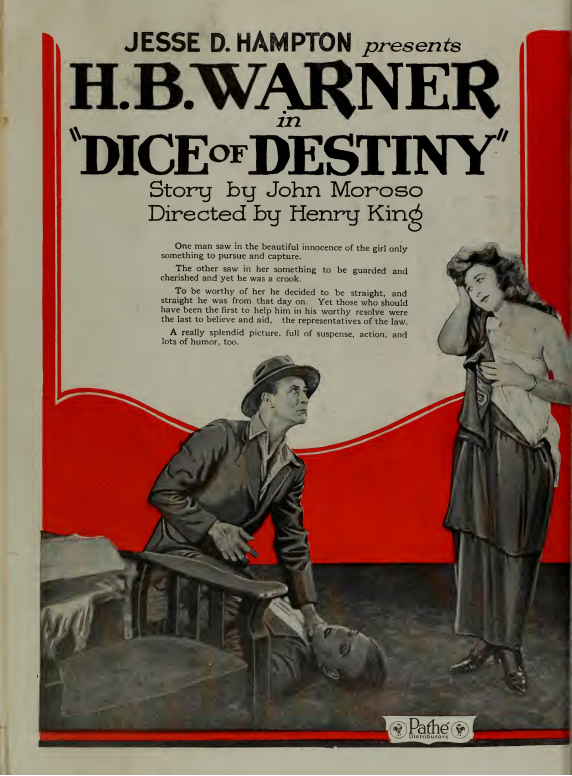
- Directed by: Henry King
- Written by: Fred Myton
- Produced by: Jesse D. Hampton
- Starring: H. B. Warner; Lillian Rich; Howard Davies
- Cinematography: Victor Milner
- Production company: Jesse D. Hampton Productions
- Distributed by: Pathé Exchange
- Release date: December 5, 1920
- Running time: 50 minutes
- Country: United States
- Language: Silent (English intertitles)

Dice of Destiny is a 1920 American silent crime drama film directed by Henry King and starring H. B. Warner, Lillian Rich, and Howard Davies.

== Cast ==
- H. B. Warner as Jimmy Doyle
- Lillian Rich as Nancy Preston
- Howard Davies as Dave Monteith
- Harvey Clark as Joe Caffey
- J.P. Lockney as Bill Preston
- Claude Payton as James Tierney
- Fred Huntley as 'Gloomy' Cole
- Rosemary Theby as Agnes

== Bibliography ==
- Donald W. McCaffrey & Christopher P. Jacobs. Guide to the Silent Years of American Cinema. Greenwood Publishing, 1999. ISBN 0-313-30345-2
