= Lawless Range =

1935 film

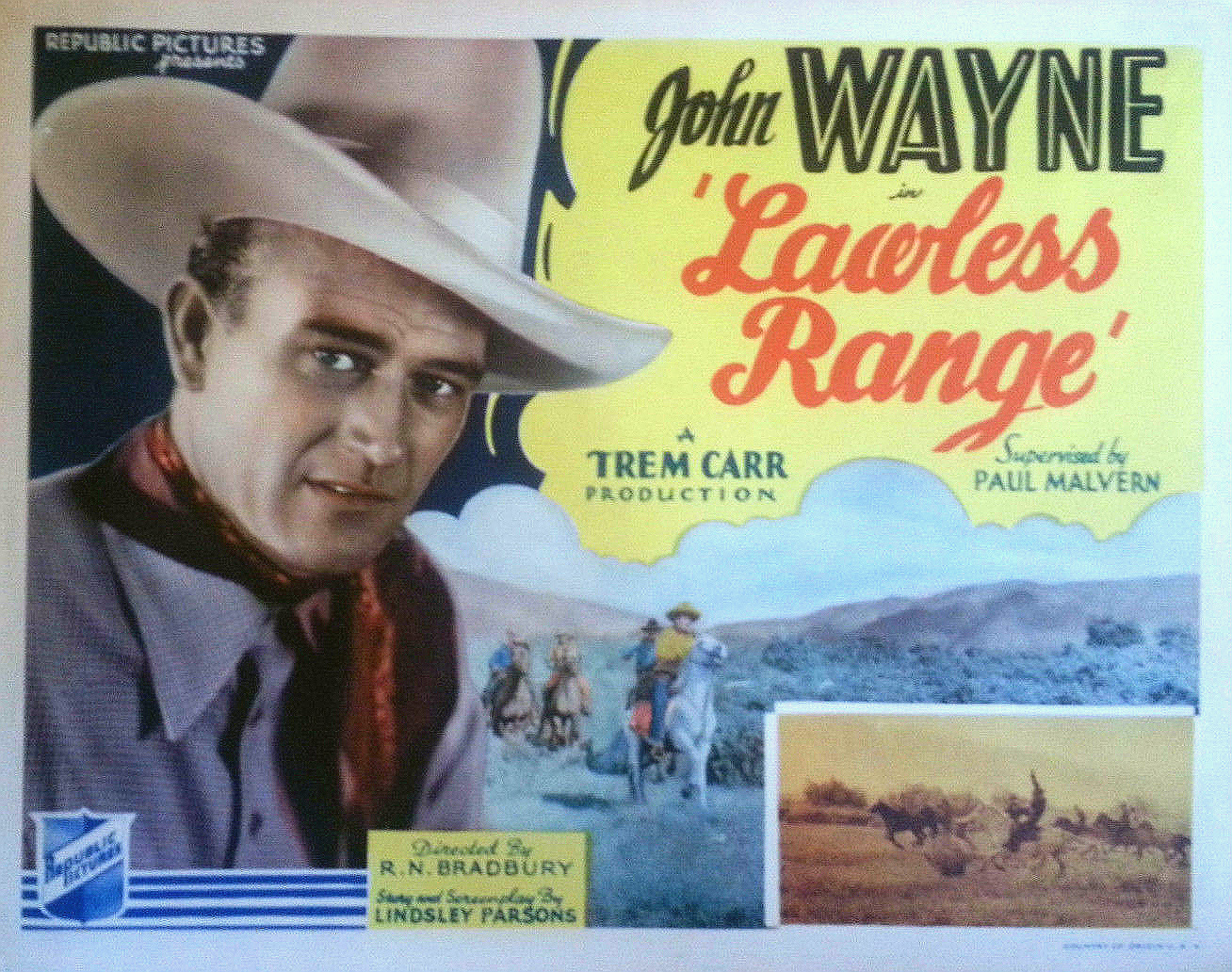
- Lobby card
- Directed by: Robert N. Bradbury
- Written by: Lindsley Parsons
- Produced by: Trem Carr; Paul Malvern
- Starring: John Wayne
- Cinematography: Archie Stout
- Edited by: Carl Pierson
- Distributed by: Republic Pictures
- Release date: November 4, 1935
- Running time: 53 minutes
- Country: United States
- Language: English

Lawless Range is a 1935 American Western film released by Republic Pictures, directed by Robert N. Bradbury and starring John Wayne. He appears as a "singing cowboy" in the film, with his singing voice dubbed by Glenn Strange.

== Plot ==
Rodeo performer John Middleton (John Wayne) is asked by his father's old friend, Hank Mason, to help investigate cattle rustling plaguing a nearby town. Upon arriving, John finds Hank has been abducted, and the area is under the thumb of a gang led by the outlaw Burns.

Teaming up with the local sheriff, John adopts a disguise to infiltrate the rustlers. He uncovers a scheme by a corrupt local banker (Frank McGlynn Jr.) who is driving ranchers away through rustling and intimidation to seize control of the town and exploit hidden gold mines.

Captured and thrown into a cave alongside Emmett, a missing rancher, John and his fellow prisoner escape. Through daring pursuits, shootouts, and clever tactics, John exposes the banker’s plot, rescues Hank, defeats the gang, restores peace to the range, and wins the affection of Hank's niece, Ann.

== Cast ==
- John Wayne as John Middleton, aka John Allen
- Sheila Bromley as Ann Mason
- Frank McGlynn Jr. as Frank Carter, a banker
- Jack Curtis as Marshal
- Wally Howe as Uncle Hank Mason
- Julia Griffith as Aunt Marie Mason
- Yakima Canutt as Joe Burns, chief henchman
- Earl Dwire as Emmett, a storekeeper
- Victor Adamson as Henchman (uncredited)
- Chuck Baldra as Henchman / Singer (uncredited)
- Charles Brinley as Rancher (uncredited)
- Bob Burns as Bert, a Storekeeper (uncredited)
- Fred Burns as Rancher (uncredited)
- Frank Ellis as Saloon Henchman (uncredited)
- Sam Flint as Sam Middleton (uncredited)
- Herman Hack as Robber (uncredited)
- Jack Hendricks as Gambler (uncredited)
- John Ince as Clem (uncredited)
- Jack Kirk as Burns's Henchman (uncredited)
- Bob Kortman as Tall Ranch Hand Clocking John (uncredited)
- George Ovey as Short Ranch Hand Clocking John (uncredited)
- Tex Palmer as Deputy Tex (uncredited)
- Fred Parker as Townsman (uncredited)
- Pascale Perry as Henchman (uncredited)
- Charles Sargent as Outlaw/Singer (uncredited)
- James Sheridan as Townsman (uncredited
- Glenn Strange as Burns's Henchman (uncredited)
- Francis Walker as Cowhand (uncredited)
- Slim Whitaker as Burns's Henchman (uncredited)
- The Wranglers as Singing Cowhands (uncredited)

== See also ==
- John Wayne filmography
