= Romance of the Rockies =

- Theatrical release poster
- Directed by: Robert North Bradbury
- Screenplay by: Robert Emmett Tansey
- Produced by: Robert North Bradbury
- Starring: Tom Keene; Beryl Wallace; Franklyn Farnum; Don Orlando; Bill Cody Jr. Earl Dwire
- Cinematography: Bert Longenecker
- Edited by: Richard G. Wray
- Music by: Frank Sanucci
- Production company: Monogram Pictures
- Distributed by: Monogram Pictures
- Release date: December 15, 1937
- Running time: 53 minutes
- Country: United States
- Language: English

Romance of the Rockies is a 1937 American Western film directed by Robert North Bradbury and written by Robert Emmett Tansey. The film stars Tom Keene, Beryl Wallace, Franklyn Farnum, Don Orlando, Bill Cody Jr. and Earl Dwire. The film was released on December 15, 1937, by Monogram Pictures.

== Plot ==
Circuit-riding doctor Tom Foster (Tom Keene), a wandering physician who travels the frontier providing medical care, arrives in a rugged Rocky Mountain region. He becomes involved in the struggles of local ranchers who are locked in a bitter conflict over water rights—essential for their livestock and livelihoods. Foster uses his skills, courage, and sense of justice to aid the ranchers.

== Cast ==
- Tom Keene as Dr. Tom Foster
- Beryl Wallace as Betty Ross
- Franklyn Farnum as Stone
- Don Orlando as Mike
- Bill Cody Jr. as Jimmy Allen
- Earl Dwire as Trigger
- Russell Paul as Saloon Singer
- Steve Clark as Deputy
- Charles Murphy as Sheriff
- Jim Corey as Henchman
- Tex Palmer as Henchman
- Blackie Whiteford as Henchman
- Frank Ellis as Henchman
