= The Gun Ranger =

1936 film

- Theatrical release poster
- Directed by: Robert N. Bradbury
- Written by: Homer King Gordon (story); George H. Plympton (adaptation)
- Produced by: A.W. Hackel (producer)
- Starring: See below
- Cinematography: Bert Longenecker
- Edited by: S. Roy Luby
- Distributed by: Republic Pictures
- Release date: 1936
- Running time: 56 minutes
- Country: United States
- Language: English

The Gun Ranger is a 1936 American Western film directed by Robert N. Bradbury.

== Cast ==
- Bob Steele as Dan Larson
- Eleanor Stewart as Molly Pearson
- John Merton as Kemper Mills
- Ernie Adams as Wally Smeed
- Earl Dwire as Bud Cooper
- Budd Buster as Carl Beeman
- Frank Ball as The Judge
- Horace Murphy as Ranch cook

== See also ==
- Bob Steele filmography
