= Lillian Rich =

English actress

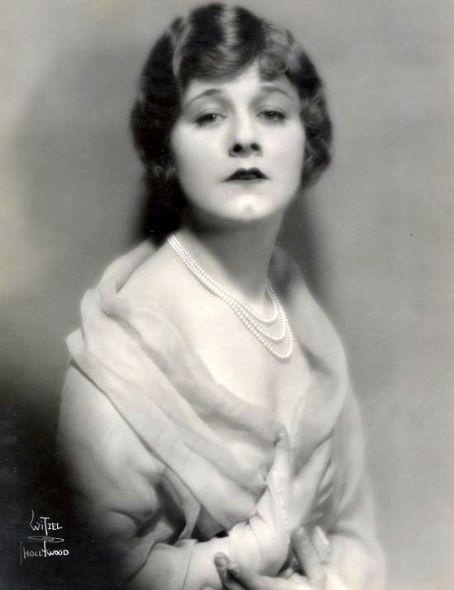
- Rich c. 1925
- Born: Lillian Rose Rich; 1 January 1900; Herne Hill, London, England
- Died: 5 January 1954 (aged 54); Woodland Hills, Los Angeles, California, U.S.
- Resting place: Valhalla Memorial Park Cemetery
- Occupation: Actress
- Years active: 1919–1940
- Spouse: Leo Nicholson

Lillian Rose Rich (1 January 1900 – 5 January 1954) was an English-born actress of the silent era. She appeared in more than 60 films between 1919 and 1940.

== Biography ==
Rich was born in Herne Hill, London, on 1 January 1900. In 1919, she married a young Canadian fighter pilot named Lionel Edward "Leo" Nicholson, and accompanied him back to his hometown of Winnipeg, Manitoba. Rich's new father-in-law decided that she had a future in Hollywood, and he gave her $1000 of his own savings to fund her acting career. After making her film debut in The Day She Paid (1919), Rich quickly became highly sought, appearing in 18 films between 1920 and 1922.

In 1923, Rich lost her financial support when her father-in-law became ill and died, and she did not produce any films until the following year. She soon divorced her husband, and Rich regained her stride in 1924, appearing in six new films, with roles in eight more in 1925. She gained critical attention for her role as a "man-eating, social-climbing" woman in Cecil B. DeMille's The Golden Bed, and a subsequent The New York Times review called her an "extraordinarily beautiful" woman. Her next – and final – notable role was in the 1926 railroad film Whispering Smith.

Her career declined in the early 1930s, possibly because Rich's voice was not well suited to the new "talkie" films that took hold as sound technology became normalized. During the 1930s she was under contract at MGM, where she played uncredited bit parts in several films.

She was in very poor health during her last years. According to the 1950 census, she was "unable to work". According to her death certificate, she died of pharyngeal cancer, after an eight month battle, shortly after her 54th birthday at the Motion Picture Country House in Woodland Hills, Los Angeles. She is buried at the Valhalla Memorial Park in Los Angeles.

== Partial filmography ==
Lobby card with Herbert Rawlinson and Rich in One Wonderful Night (1922)

- The Day She Paid (1919)
- One Hour Before Dawn (1920)
- Dice of Destiny (1920)
- Felix O'Day (1920)
- Beyond (1921)
- The Sage Hen (1921)
- Go Straight (1921)
- The Millionaire (1921)
- The Blazing Trail (1921)
- Man to Man (1922)
- The Bearcat (1922)
- Afraid to Fight (1922)
- The Kentucky Derby (1922)
- One Wonderful Night (1922)
- The Love Master (1924)
- The Man from Wyoming (1924)
- The Phantom Horseman (1924)
- Empty Hearts (1924)
- Never Say Die (1924)
- Soft Shoes (1925)
- The Golden Bed (1925)
- Seven Days (1925)
- The Love Gamble (1925)
- The Ship of Souls (1925)
- On the Front Page (1926)
- Dancing Days (1926)
- Exclusive Rights (1926)
- The Isle of Retribution (1926)
- The Golden Web (1926)
- Snowbound (1927)
- God's Great Wilderness (1927)
- Woman's Law (1927)
- Web of Fate (1927)
- That's My Daddy (1928)
- The Old Code (1928)
- The Forger (1928)
- High Seas (1929)
- Red Pearls (1930)
- The Devil Plays (1931)
- Once a Lady (1931)
- A Lad an' a Lamp (1932)
- Birthday Blues (1932)
- Mark of the Spur (1932)
- Free Wheeling (1932)
- Sprucin' Up (1935)
- The Girl Friend (1935)
