= The Dawn Rider =

1935 film

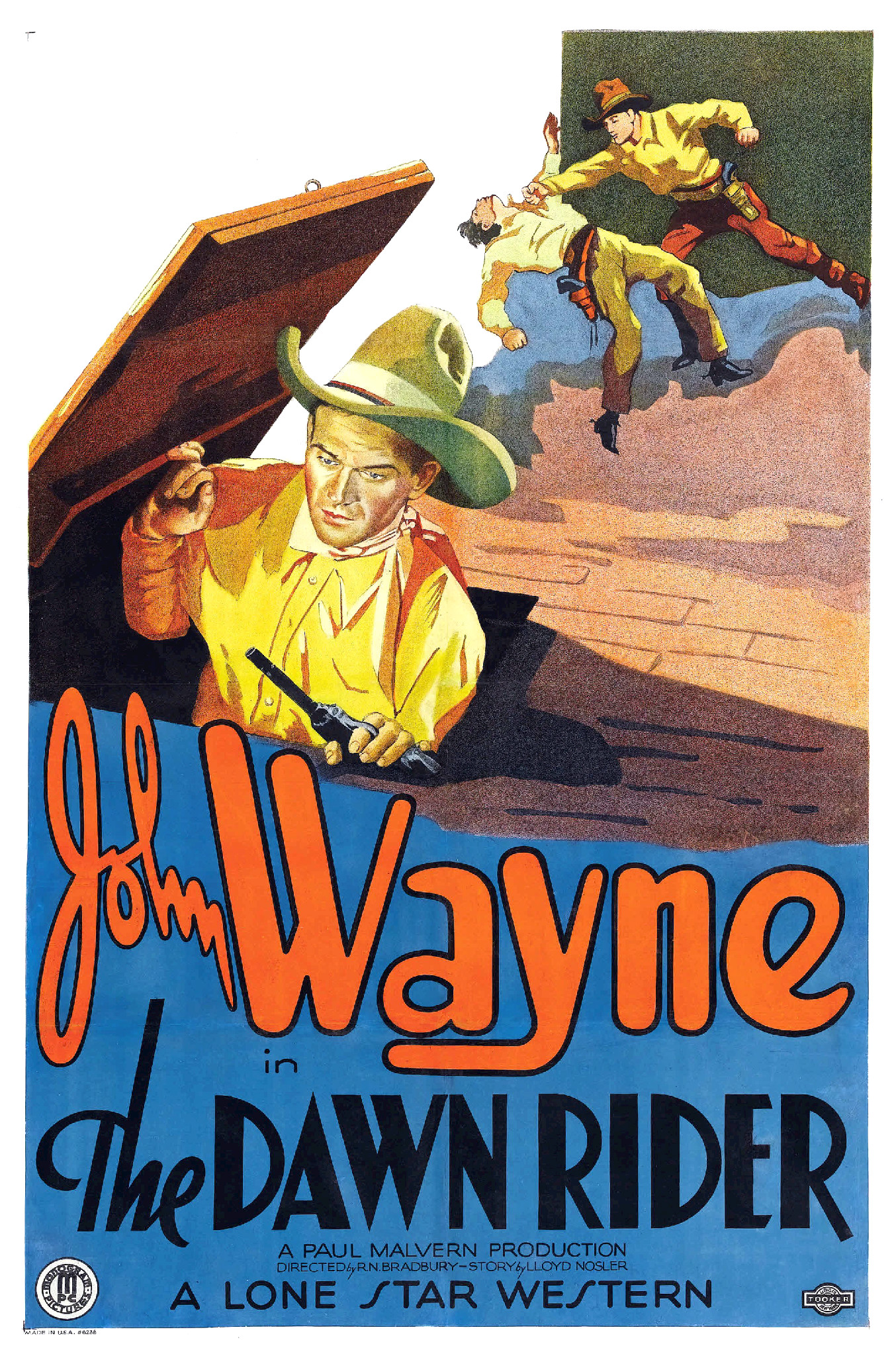
- Theatrical poster
- Directed by: Robert N. Bradbury
- Written by: Robert N. Bradbury; Lloyd Nosler (story)
- Produced by: Paul Malvern
- Starring: John Wayne
- Cinematography: Archie Stout
- Edited by: Carl Pierson
- Production company: Lone Star Pictures
- Distributed by: Monogram Pictures
- Release date: June 20, 1935
- Running time: 53 minutes
- Country: United States
- Language: English
- Budget: $10,000 (estimated)

The Dawn Rider is a 1935 American Western film starring John Wayne and directed by Robert N. Bradbury.

The film was later released in a colorized version on home video/DVD under the title Cold Vengeance.

== Plot ==
John Mason arrives in town and soon has a fight with Ben McClure. After the fight the two have a drink together and discover that McClure works for Mason's father in his freight company. When they go to the freight office they walk in on a robbery with Mason's father emptying the safe at gunpoint. Dad Mason tries to draw on one of the outlaws but is shot through a window by another robber. Before he dies he tells his son that the killer was wearing a polka dot bandanna. John chases the bandits, shooting several, followed by Ben. John is shot off his horse and Ben finds him and takes him to the doctor. Alice Gordon, who Ben had introduced to John earlier, offers to look after him while he recovers at Ben's cabin while Ben is away.

Dad Mason's killer, Rudd, is convinced by the saloon owner, who is in league with the bandits, to try and kill John before he can testify. Rudd bursts into the cabin and encounters his sister, Alice.

Ben is robbed on his freight run, again. This time the robbers steal the ring Ben was going to propose to Alice with. In town, Rudd and the bartender try to turn him against John by implying that Alice and John are carrying on behind his back. Ben returns to his cabin, with Rudd. John notices that Rudd is wearing a polka dot bandanna. Ben tells John he was going to propose to Alice, until he was robbed of his ring. John tells him he doesn't need a ring and offers to take his freight run the next day so Ben can propose.

The next day John stages a conversation in front of Rudd and the saloon owner, implying he will be taking a shipment of gold on the freight trip. Rudd tells two bandits to hide in the wagon. John puts rocks instead of gold in the strongbox. As they are about to set off John spots movement in the back of the wagon and silently indicates this to his driver, Pete. When they are out of town, John and Pete surprise the bandits and force them to drive the wagon at gunpoint, while hiding in the back. Rudd and the rest of the bandits ambush the wagon but are attacked by John and Pete, allowing the wagon to keep going. The bandits give chase. John hides in a tree and jumps a bandit, taking his horse. Rudd shoots Pete and just as John catches up the wagon crashes killing Pete. Rudd is the only bandit left but after his trips and throws him, he heads to the Gordon farm. Taking a shortcut, he gets there in time to get a fresh horse. Alice calls him, but he ignores her. John arrives soon after but doesn't say any more than he needs to talk to Rudd. Ben arrives, sees Alice pleading with John, assumes the worst and leaves.

John confronts Rudd in the saloon. Rudd says if John is still in town in one hour, he will kill him. Rudd riles up Ben who has been drinking at the bar. Ben goes to the John's and confronts John. John tries to explain but Ben hits him. John refuses to fight back. Alice arrives, having found out about the showdown, and tries to stop John going through with it, saying she doesn't want to lose either of them. John says he must and goes out to see to his horse. Alice pleads with Ben who says he won't let John do anything to Rudd. Ben empties John's gun. John returns, picks up his guns and tells Ben not to tell Alice that Rudd killed his father. John heads to town, followed eventually by Ben.

When John arrives, Rudd heads out to meet him while the saloon goes to an upstairs window. Rudd hides in an alley in is about to shoot John when Ben sees him and shoots him. The saloon owner then shoots Ben. John tries to shoot the saloon owner and discovers his gun is empty. He climbs up the outside of the building, disarms him and eventually throws him into the street, killing him. He returns to Ben, who dies in his arms.

John and Alice get married.

== Cast ==
- John Wayne as John Mason
- Marion Burns as Alice Gordon
- Dennis Moore as Rudd Gordon
- Reed Howes as Ben McClure
- Joseph De Grasse as Dad Mason
- Yakima Canutt as Saloon Owner
- Earl Dwire as Pete (Expressman)
- Nelson McDowell as Bates (Undertaker)

== Remake ==
A 2012 remake of this film, entitled Dawn Rider, cast Christian Slater in the John Mason role.

== See also ==
- John Wayne filmography
- List of American films of 1935
