= The Man from Wyoming =

1924 film

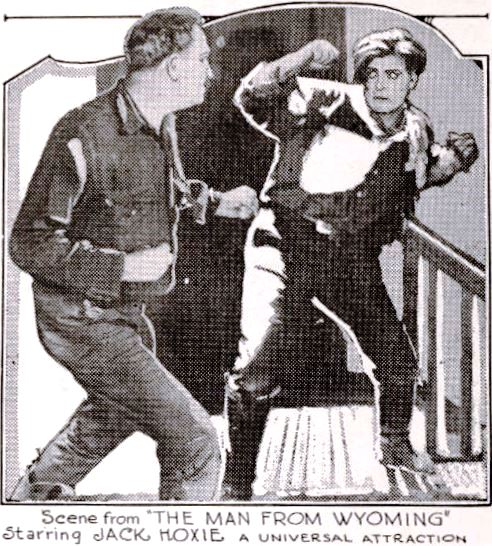
- Newspaper advertisement
- Directed by: Robert N. Bradbury
- Written by: Isadore Bernstein
- Based on: Wyoming: A Story of the Outdoor West by William MacLeod Raine
- Produced by: Carl Laemmle
- Starring: Jack Hoxie; Lillian Rich; William Welsh
- Cinematography: Merritt B. Gerstad
- Production company: Universal Pictures
- Distributed by: Universal Pictures
- Release date: January 28, 1924
- Running time: 5 reels
- Country: United States
- Languages: Silent; English intertitles

The Man from Wyoming is a 1924 American silent Western film directed by Robert N. Bradbury and starring Jack Hoxie, Lillian Rich, and William Welsh.

== Plot ==
As described in a film magazine, Jack Halloway (Payton) covets the land of cattleman David Messiter (Welsh), but Messiter will not sell. When Ned Bannister (Hoxie) escapes from prison and falls into the hands of Halloway, the latter recognizes a tool put into his hands by Fate. He tells Bannister that he will not give him away to the authorities if he will follow instructions. The instructions are to take a herd of sheep, supplied by Halloway, and graze them upon the government land adjacent to the Messiter ranch. The sheep will spoil the land for use as cattle pasture. Bannister, unwilling to go back to prison, consents. He is gently ordered by the Messiter cowboys to make himself scarce. He declines firmly, and when Messiter himself come to argue with him, he remains firm. Just as he is finished talking with Messiter, the latter, on his way to leave, is shot in the back. Bannister is suspected, but his gun shows it was not used and nothing can be proved. Helen Messiter (Rich), niece of the dead man, comes to the ranch from the state capitol, where she has been living with her guardian, the Governor (Corrigan), and as she drives to the ranch she meets the scene of a lone man ambushed by many. She saves him and finds out later that he is suspected of killing her uncle. The men who ambushed him were her own cowboys. From then on the desires of Halloway are now directed toward the woman of the Messiter ranch as well as the ranch. The perils of Bannister and the impulses of the young woman who has taken charge of the Messiter ranch tangle up in a maze of dramatic adventure with a final solution in a thrilling climax.

== Cast ==
- Jack Hoxie as Ned Bannister
- Lillian Rich as Helen Messiter
- William Welsh as David Messiter
- Claude Payton as Jack Halloway
- Ben Corbett as Red
- Lon Poff as Jim McWilliams
- George Kuwa as Sing Lee Wah
- James Corrigan as Governor of Wyoming

== Preservation ==
With no prints of The Man from Wyoming located in any film archives, it is a lost film.
