= The Phantom Horseman (1924 film) =

1924 film

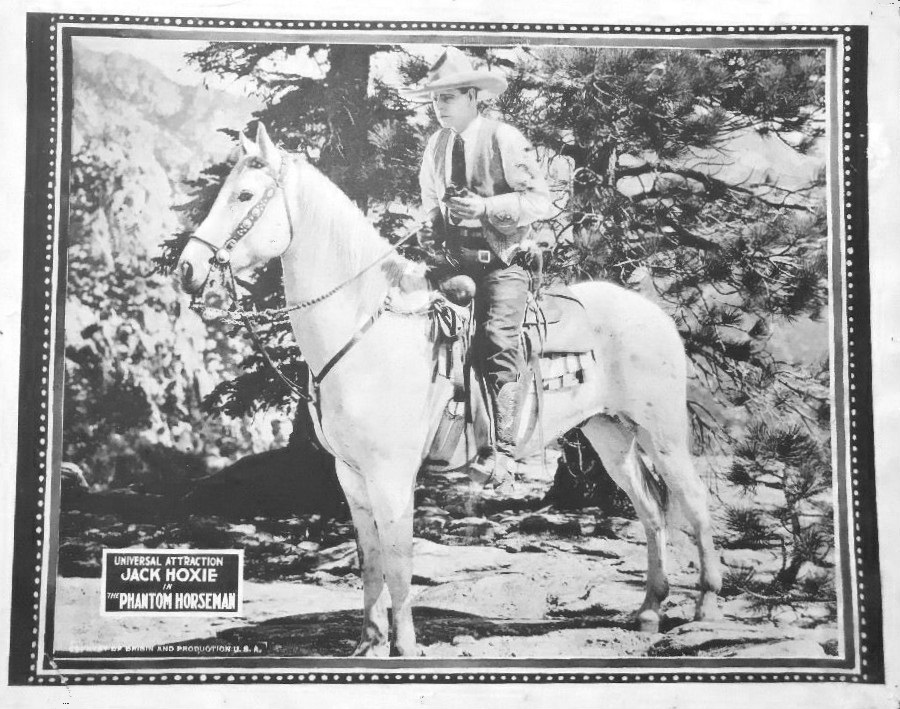
- Lobby card
- Directed by: Robert North Bradbury
- Screenplay by: Isadore Bernstein
- Starring: Jack Hoxie; Lillian Rich; Neil McKinnon; Wade Boteler; William McCall; Ben Corbett
- Cinematography: Merritt B. Gerstad
- Production company: Universal Pictures
- Distributed by: Universal Pictures
- Release date: March 3, 1924
- Running time: 50 minutes
- Country: United States
- Language: Silent (English intertitles)

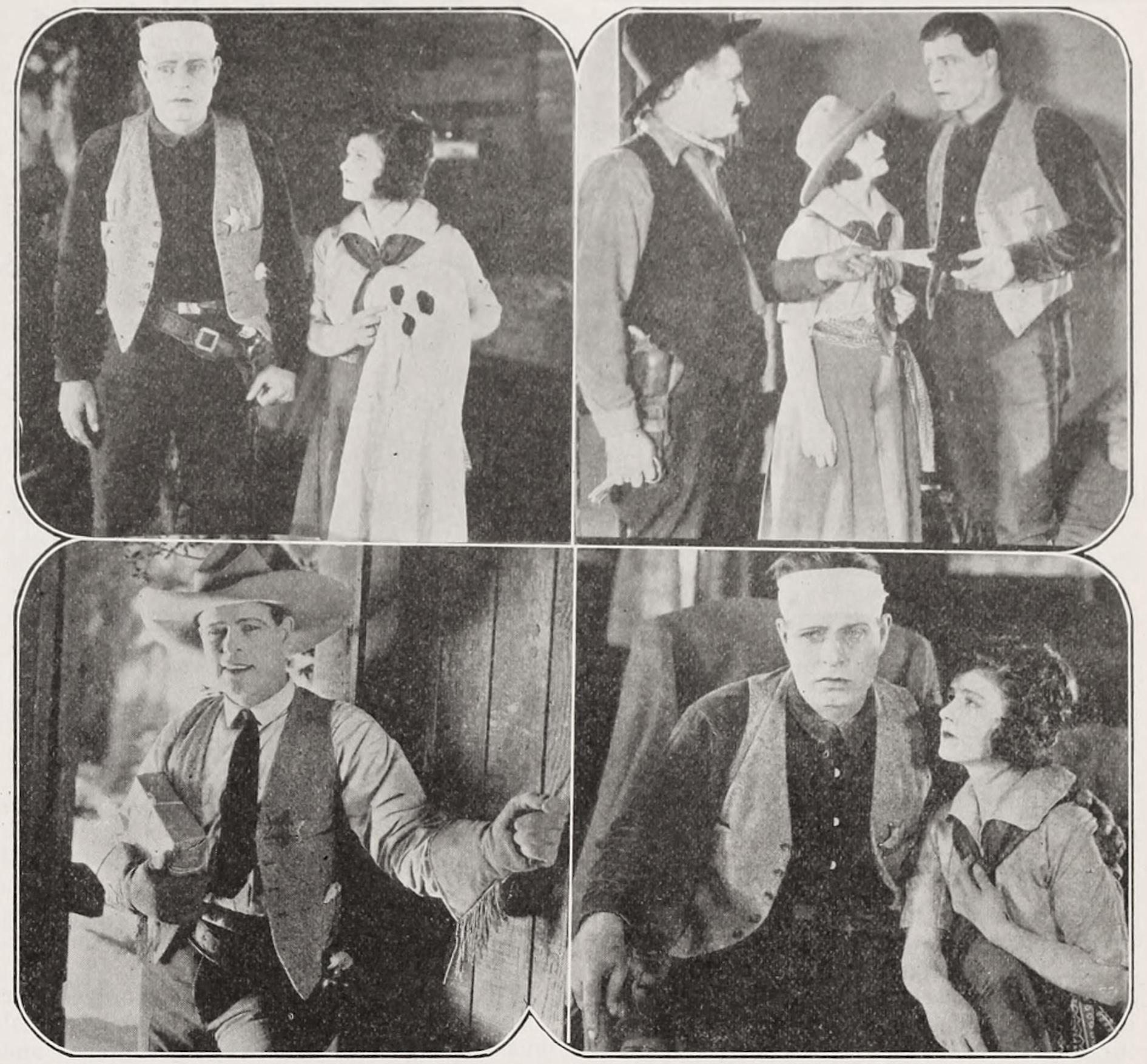
Scenes from the film

The Phantom Horseman is a 1924 American silent Western film directed by Robert North Bradbury and written by Isadore Bernstein. The film stars Jack Hoxie, Lillian Rich, Neil McKinnon, Wade Boteler, William McCall, and Ben Corbett. The film was released on March 3, 1924, by Universal Pictures.

== Plot ==
As described in a film magazine review, Sheriff Bob Winton promises to capture "The Hawk," a night riding bandit. The stage coach is robbed of gold owned by loan shark Jefferson Williams, who has the mortgage on run by Dorothy Mason and her scape-grace brother Fred. The Williams safe is robbed and Bob arrests Fred. In order to save the brother of the young woman he loves, Bob asserts that he is the Hawk. However, Fred commits suicide and leaves behind a note admitting that he is the outlaw. This clears Bob who then thrashes Williams and wins the affection of Dorothy.

== Cast ==
- Jack Hoxie as Bob Winton
- Lillian Rich as Dorothy Mason
- Neil McKinnon as Fred Mason
- Wade Boteler as Jefferson Williams
- William McCall as Deputy Sheriff
- Ben Corbett as Benny
- George A. Williams as Judge
- Ruby Lafayette as Maxwell's Mother
