= Son of Oklahoma =

1932 film

- Directed by: Robert N. Bradbury
- Written by: Robert N. Bradbury; Berle Tuttle; George C. Hull
- Produced by: Trem Carr
- Starring: Bob Steele
- Cinematography: Archie Stout
- Edited by: Carl Pierson
- Production company: Trem Carr Pictures
- Distributed by: Sono Art-World Wide Pictures
- Release date: July 17, 1932
- Running time: 60 minutes
- Country: United States
- Language: English

Son of Oklahoma is a 1932 American Western film directed by Robert N. Bradbury and starring his son Bob Steele.

== Cast ==
- Bob Steele - Dan Clayton
- Josie Sedgwick - Mary Clayton, aka Shotgun Mary
- Carmen Laroux - Anita Verdugo
- Julian Rivero - Don Manuel Verdugo
- Robert Homans - John Clayton, aka Silent Jack Clay
- Henry Roquemore - Salesman Stage Passenger
- Earl Dwire - Ray Brent
