= No Man's Range =

1935 film

- Directed by: Robert N. Bradbury
- Written by: Forbes Parkhill
- Produced by: A.W. Hackel (producer)
- Starring: See below
- Cinematography: William Nobles
- Edited by: S. Roy Luby
- Distributed by: Supreme Pictures
- Release date: September 5, 1935
- Running time: 56 minutes
- Country: United States
- Language: English

No Man's Range is a 1935 American Western film directed by Robert N. Bradbury starring his son Bob Steele.

== Plot summary ==
Accompanied by his sidekick Fuzz, Jim Hale goes to visit his stepfather Ed Oliver, who has promised him part ownership of his ranch. The pair stumble into a range war and someone pretending to be Oliver.

== Cast ==
- Bob Steele as Jim Hale
- Roberta Gale as Helen Green
- Buck Connors as Fuzz
- Steve Clark as Ed Brady
- Charles K. French as Ed Oliver
- Jack Rockwell as Sheriff
- Roger Williams as Henchman Pete
- Earl Dwire as Phony Ed Oliver

== Soundtrack ==
- Jack Kirk - "No Man's Range (When Evening Shadows Fall)"

== See also ==
- Bob Steele filmography
