= Robert North Bradbury =

American film director

- Born: Ronald E. Bradbury; March 23, 1886; Walla Walla, Washington
- Died: November 24, 1949 (aged 63); Glendale, California
- Occupations: Film director; screenwriter; composer
- Spouse: Nieta Quinn Bradbury
- Children: Robert Bradbury Jr. (Bob Steele); Bill Bradbury; Jim Bradbury

Robert North Bradbury (March 23, 1886 – November 24, 1949) (born Ronald E. Bradbury, also billed as R.N. Bradbury or Robert Bradbury) was an American film actor, director, and screenwriter. He directed more than 125 movies between 1918 and 1941. He was considered one of the best directors of Westerns during the 1930s.

Bradbury is known for directing early Poverty Row Westerns starring John Wayne in the 1930s. He is the father of noted cowboy actor Bob Steele.

Bradbury was born in Walla Walla, Washington, on March 23, 1886, and died in Glendale, California, on November 24, 1949, at age 63. With Nieta Quinn Bradbury, he had three children, Robert Bradbury Jr. (Bob Steele), Bill Bradbury, and Jim Bradbury.

== Early life ==
Bradbury was born in Walla Walla, Washington, on March 23, 1886. He later lived in Portland, Oregon, and along with his wife, Nieta Quinn Bradbury, he had a vaudville act. Bradbury had three children, Robert Bradbury Jr. (Bob Steele), Bill Bradbury, and Jim Bradbury. When the boys were still young, the family moved to Glendale, California.

== Silent era ==
Bradbury started out in Hollywood appearing as an actor in early two-reelers starring Broncho Billy Anderson. As Bradbury shifted to directing, he directed Broncho Billy in three longer films, and then William S. Hart in a number of pictures. Bradbury made a name for himself as a director after he directed several Tom Mix films. During the Silent picture era, Bradbury was considered one of Hollywood's best action directors.

In 1920, Bradbury filmed and directed a number of two-reelers that he had made of his boys, Bill and Bob. After showing these to friends, it was suggested that he produce them as an adventure series for children. They were released as a series of 16 one-reelers titled The Adventures of Bill and Bob. The series was only moderately successful because screenings were designed for children and thus were often withdrawn from theaters. Instead, they were generally shown in Sunday school groups and in schools.

Bradbury directed several films with Jack Hoxie, whom he kept on his horse as much as possible, avoiding closeup dramatics. His film credits with Hoxie include Riders of the Law (1922), Desert Rider (1923), The Forbidden Trail (1923), Gallopin' Through (1923), The Red Warning (1923), Wolf Tracks (1923), The Galloping Ace (1924), The Man from Wyoming (1924), The Phantom Horseman (1924), Hidden Loot (1925), The Border Sheriff (1926), and Looking for Trouble (1926).

With Davy Crockett at the Fall of the Alamo (1926) was a breakthrough film for Bradbury. It was given a larger number of extras as well as a more ambitious set than his previous films. This was the first film to emphasize Davy Crockett's own version of his double personality - the Congressman too idealistic to succeed in politics and the frontiersman who hides his sensitivity.

== Work with John Wayne ==
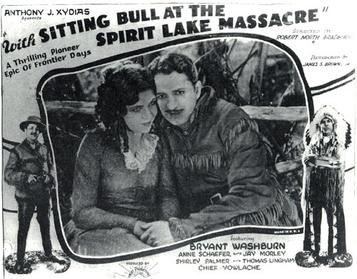
Sitting Bull at the Spirit Lake Massacre lobby card.

Bradbury is most famous for directing early Westerns starring John Wayne. Bradbury helped create and advance the ideological image of John Wayne. After a brief run at Warner Bros in 1933, Wayne was back into Poverty Row in 1934 at Monogram. Trem Carr, who had founded Monogram with W. Ray Johnston, had contracted Wayne as well as Yakima Canutt. Carr then hired Bradbury to write the screenplays as well as direct the majority of the pictures. This is where his most watchable B-Westerns were made with Archie Stout as cameraman and Bradbury as director.

These inexpensively shot 1930s B movies include Riders of Destiny (1933), one of the earliest examples of the singing cowboy movie. The role of Singin' Sandy Sanders was created for Wayne by Bradbury, who saw a market niche for the singing cowboy. Bradbury used his son Bill to dub Wayne's singing voice for the role of Singin' Sandy. Although Wayne's singing voice did not match his speaking voice, and the character of Singin' Sandy was not used again, it paved the way for Gene Autry and other singing cowboys. Bradbury had Wayne do his last lip syncing in Westward Ho (1935), where it is believed that Jack Kirk provided Wayne's singing voice.

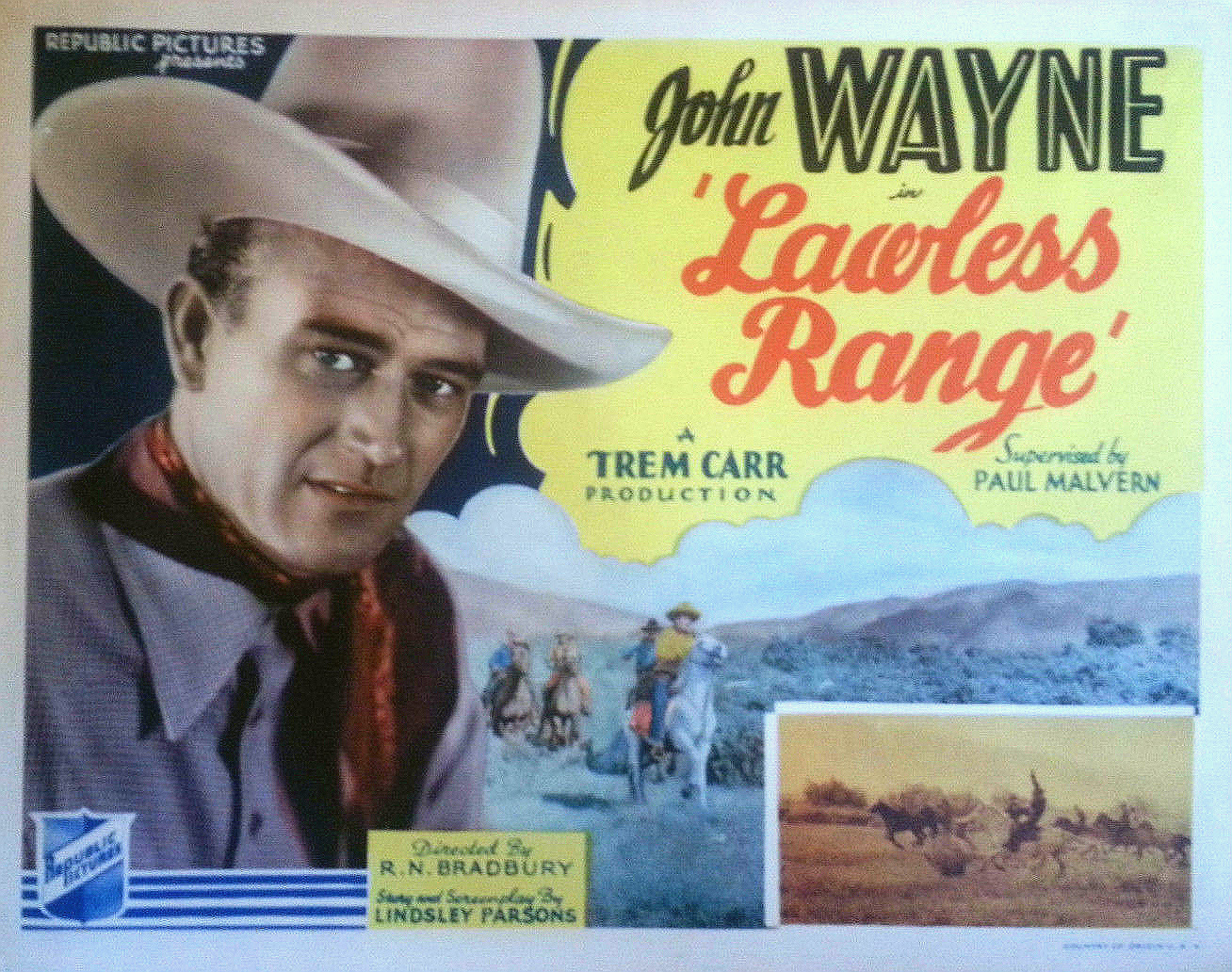
The Lawless Range lobby card.

Other B Westerns starring Wayne and directed by Bradbury during this period were The Lucky Texan (1934), West of the Divide (1934), Blue Steel (1934), The Man From Utah (1934), The Star Packer (1934), The Trail Beyond (1934; co-starring Noah Beery, Sr. and Noah Beery, Jr.), The Lawless Frontier (1934), Texas Terror (1935), Rainbow Valley (1935), The Dawn Rider (1935), and Lawless Range (1935). Many were also written by Bradbury, and almost all featured character actor George "Gabby" Hayes.

Wayne, along with stuntman Yakima Canutt and Bradbury developed the "pass system" of throwing near-miss punches that looked realistic. This involved the precise placement of cameras to make the misses appear to be actual punches.

== Later work ==
Working at A. W. Hackett's Supreme Pictures reunited Bradbury in working with his son, Bob Steele on the film Western Justice (1934). At the same time they were filming Western Justice, they simultaneously filmed Kid Courageous (1935). Bradbury also wrote the script, which includes a scene in which the villain is skinned alive, mimicking a similar scene in the film The Black Cat (1934) which starred Bella Legosi and Boris Karloff.

Although most of Bradbury's work during the 1930s was with Supreme, he was occasionally brought into Republic Pictures and Monogram Pictures when the need arose. Bradbury finished his career working for Monogram and Grand National Films Inc. These were more stable than many of the independent studios he had worked at in his early years. He made his final film for Monogram, Forbidden Trails (1941).

== Style ==
Bradbury directed many musical Westerns in which the action stops completely while the cowboy breaks into song. Bradbury’s camera coverage in all situations is very basic. His direction was a consistent pattern of wide shots and dialog closeups. Most of his Westerns are thin on plot.

== Filmography ==
=== Director ===
- The Social Pirates (1916) (*serial)
- The Wooing of Riley (1918)
- The Iron Test (1918)
- Perils of Thunder Mountain (1919)
- The Faith of the Strong (1919)
- The Last of His People (1919)
- The Adventures of Bill and Bob (1920)
- Into the Light (1920)
- The Impostor (1921)
- The Tempest (1921)
- The Sage-Brush Musketeers (1921)
- Mother o' Dreams (1921)
- Lorraine of the Timberlands (1921)
- The Honor of Rameriz (1921)
- The Spirit of the Lake (1921)
- The Heart of Doreon (1921)
- Dangerous Trails (1922)
- It Is the Law (1922)
- Seeing Red (1922)
- Daring Dangers (1922)
- Two Men (1922)
- Ridin' Through (1922)
- The Hour of Doom (1922)
- A Guilty Cause (1922)
- At Large (1922)
- Come Clean (1922)
- Riders of the Law (1922)
- The Forbidden Trail (1923)
- Gallopin' Through (1923)
- Wolf Tracks (1923)
- Desert Rider (1923)
- Face to Face (1923)
- The Wolf Trapper (1923)
- What Love Will Do (1923)
- No Tenderfoot (1923)
- The Red Warning (1923)
- The Man from Wyoming (1924)
- The Phantom Horseman (1924)
- Wanted by the Law (1924)
- The Galloping Ace (1924)
- Behind Two Guns (1924)
- Yankee Speed (1924)
- In High Gear (1924)
- Riders of Mystery (1925)
- Moccasins (1925)
- The Speed Demon (1925)
- The Battler (1925)
- Hidden Loot (1925)
- The Danger Zone (1925/I)
- The Border Sheriff (1926)
- Daniel Boone Thru the Wilderness (1926)
- Looking for Trouble (1926)
- The Fighting Doctor (1926)
- Davy Crockett at the Fall of the Alamo (1926)
- Sitting Bull at the Spirit Lake Massacre (1927)
- The Mojave Kid (1927)
- The Bantam Cowboy (1928)
- Lightning Speed (1928)
- Headin' for Danger (1928)
- Dugan of the Badlands (1931)
- A Son of the Plains (1931)
- Law of the West (1932)
- Riders of the Desert (1932)
- The Man from Hell's Edges (1932)
- Son of Oklahoma (1932)
- Hidden Valley (1932)
- Texas Buddies (1932)
- Breed of the Border (1933)
- The Gallant Fool (1933)
- Galloping Romeo (1933)
- Ranger's Code (1933)
- Riders of Destiny (1933) with John Wayne
- The Lucky Texan (1934) with John Wayne and George "Gabby" Hayes
- West of the Divide (1934) with John Wayne and George "Gabby" Hayes
- Blue Steel (1934) with John Wayne and George "Gabby" Hayes
- The Man from Utah (1934) with John Wayne and George "Gabby" Hayes
- The Star Packer (1934) with John Wayne and George "Gabby" Hayes
- Happy Landing (1934)
- The Trail Beyond (1934) with John Wayne, Noah Beery, Sr., and Noah Beery, Jr.
- The Lawless Frontier (1934) with John Wayne and George "Gabby" Hayes
- Western Justice (1934)
- Kid Courageous (1934)
- No Man's Range (1935)
- Texas Terror (1935) with John Wayne and George "Gabby" Hayes
- Big Calibre (1935)
- Rainbow Valley (1935) with John Wayne and George "Gabby" Hayes
- Smokey Smith (1935)
- Tombstone Terror (1935)
- The Dawn Rider (1935) with John Wayne
- Sundown Saunders (1935)
- Westward Ho (1935) with John Wayne
- The Rider of the Law (1935)
- Between Men (1935)
- Lawless Range (1935) with John Wayne
- Alias John Law (1935)
- The Courageous Avenger (1935)
- Trail of Terror (1935)
- Valley of the Lawless (1936)
- The Kid Ranger (1936)
- Last of the Warrens (1936)
- The Law Rides (1936)
- Brand of the Outlaws (1936)
- Cavalry (1936)
- Headin' for the Rio Grande (1936)
- The Gun Ranger (1937)
- Trouble in Texas (1937)
- Hittin' the Trail (1937)
- The Trusted Outlaw (1937)
- Sing, Cowboy, Sing (1937)
- Riders of the Rockies (1937)
- Riders of the Dawn (1937)
- God's Country and the Man (1937)
- Stars Over Arizona (1937)
- Where Trails Divide (1937)
- Danger Valley (1937)
- Romance of the Rockies (1937)
- Forbidden Trails (1941)

=== Miscellaneous ===
- Riders of Destiny (1933) (story)
- Blue Steel (1934) (story & screenplay)
- West of the Divide (1934) (story & screenplay)
- The Lucky Texan (1934) (story & screenplay)
- The Star Packer (1934) (story & screenplay)
- Blue Steel (1934) (producer) (uncredited)
- The Lawless Frontier (1934) (story & screenplay)
- Westward Ho (1935) (songwriter: "The Girl I Loved Long Ago") (uncredited)
- Texas Terror (1935) (story)
- The Dawn Rider (1935) (screenplay) (uncredited)
- Lawless Range (1935) (lyrics: "The Girl I Loved Long Ago" – uncredited) / (music: "The Girl I Loved Long Ago" – (uncredited)
