= The Man from Hell's Edges =

1932 film

- Film poster (as El Lobo)
- Directed by: Robert N. Bradbury
- Written by: Robert N. Bradbury
- Produced by: Trem Carr
- Starring: Bob Steele; Nancy Drexel; Julian Rivero
- Cinematography: Wilfred M. Cline
- Edited by: Carl Pierson
- Production company: Trem Carr Pictures
- Distributed by: Sono Art-World Wide Pictures
- Release date: June 15, 1932 (United States)
- Running time: 57 minutes
- Country: United States
- Language: English

The Man from Hell's Edges (also known as El Lobo) is a 1932 American Pre-Code Western film starring Bob Steele. It was written and directed by Steele's father, Robert N. Bradbury and produced by Trem Carr Pictures. It was released in the United States on June 15, 1932.

== Plot ==
Seeking to avenge his father, Bob Williams, also known as "Flash" Manning, breaks out of prison, goes to the town where his father was killed, takes a job as town deputy, then ingratiates himself to the local outlaws, one of whom he believes to be his father's killer.

== Cast ==
- Bob Steele as Bob Williams
- Julian Rivero as Lobo
- Nancy Drexel as Betty
- Robert Homans as Sheriff
- George Hayes as Shamrock Cassidy
- Gilbert Holmes as Half Pint
- Perry Murdock as Joe Danti

== Production ==
The film was completed in just 8 days, finishing in May 1932.
