= Looking for Trouble (1926 film) =

1926 film

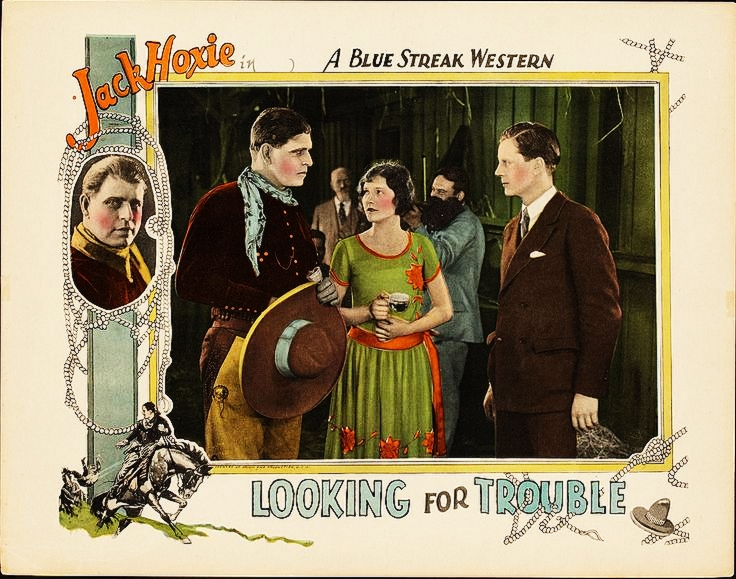
- Directed by: Robert N. Bradbury
- Written by: Stephen Chalmers; George Hively
- Produced by: Carl Laemmle
- Starring: Jack Hoxie; Marceline Day; Clark Comstock
- Cinematography: Harry Mason; William Nobles
- Production company: Universal Pictures
- Distributed by: Universal Pictures
- Release date: May 30, 1926
- Running time: 49 minutes
- Country: United States
- Languages: Silent; English intertitles

Looking for Trouble is a 1926 American silent Western film directed by Robert N. Bradbury and starring Jack Hoxie, Marceline Day and Clark Comstock.

== Cast ==
- Jack Hoxie as Jack William Pepper
- Marceline Day as Tulip Hellier
- J. Gordon Russell as Jasper Murchison
- Clark Comstock as Jim Hellier
- Edmund Cobb as Phil Curtis
- Bud Osborne as Lou Burkhold
- Peggy Montgomery as Laura Burkhold
- William J. Dyer as Sheriff Tom Plump
