= Blue Steel (1934 film) =

1934 film

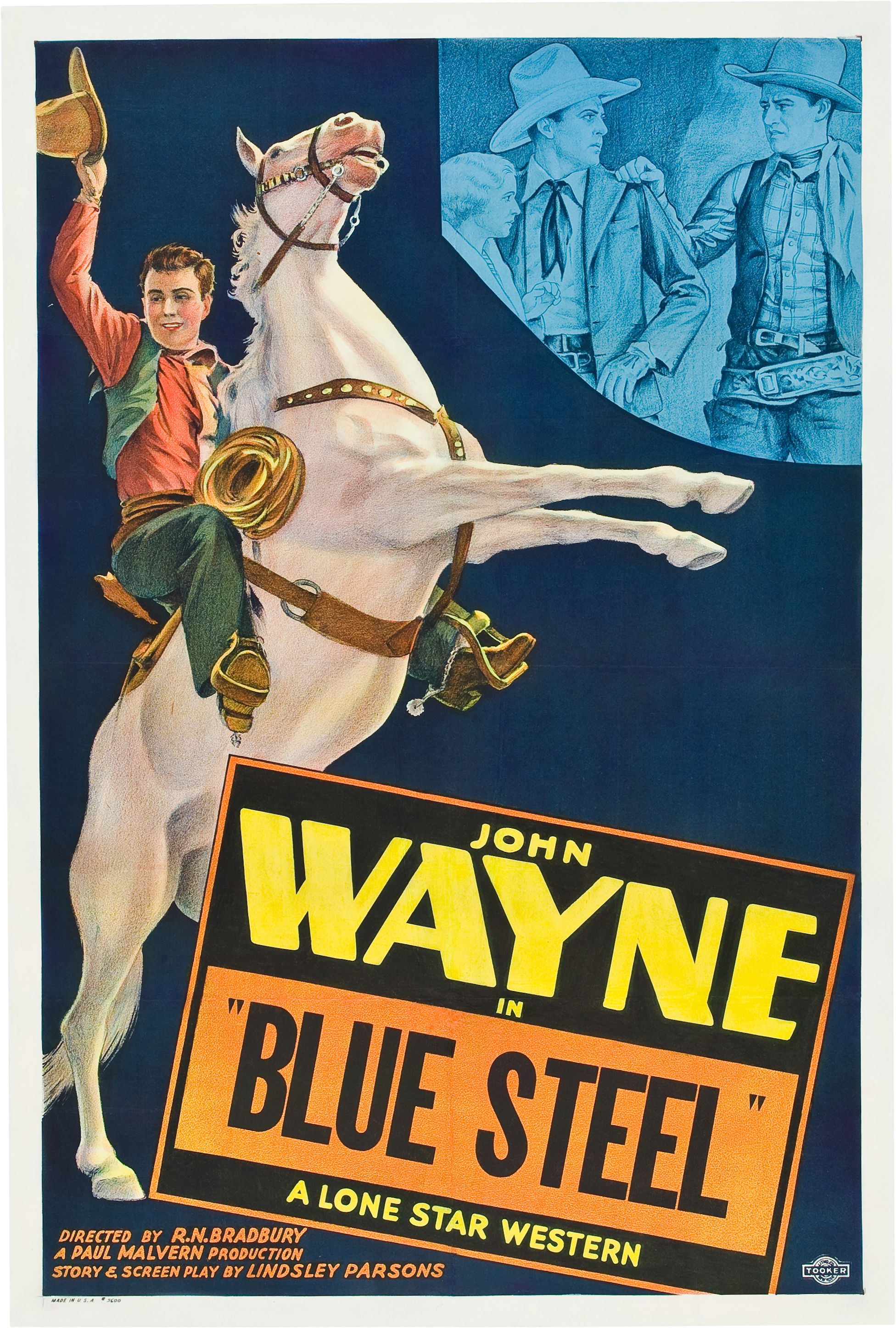
- Film poster
- Directed by: Robert N. Bradbury
- Written by: Robert N. Bradbury
- Produced by: Paul Malvern
- Starring: John Wayne; George "Gabby" Hayes
- Cinematography: Archie Stout
- Distributed by: Monogram Pictures; Genius Entertainment
- Release date: May 10, 1934
- Running time: 54 minutes
- Country: United States
- Language: English

Full film

Blue Steel is a 1934 American pre-Code Monogram Western film directed by Robert N. Bradbury and starring John Wayne. Wayne plays a U.S. Marshal who is trying to capture the Polka Dot Bandit, who has taken off with $4,000. The film also featured Yakima Canutt and George "Gabby" Hayes. It was released as Stolen Goods in the UK, and this version was later released in a colorized version on home video. Since the movie has fallen into the public domain, several versions are in circulation, including a colorized edition with a jarringly re-dubbed soundtrack, including dialogue, music and sound effects.

== Plot ==
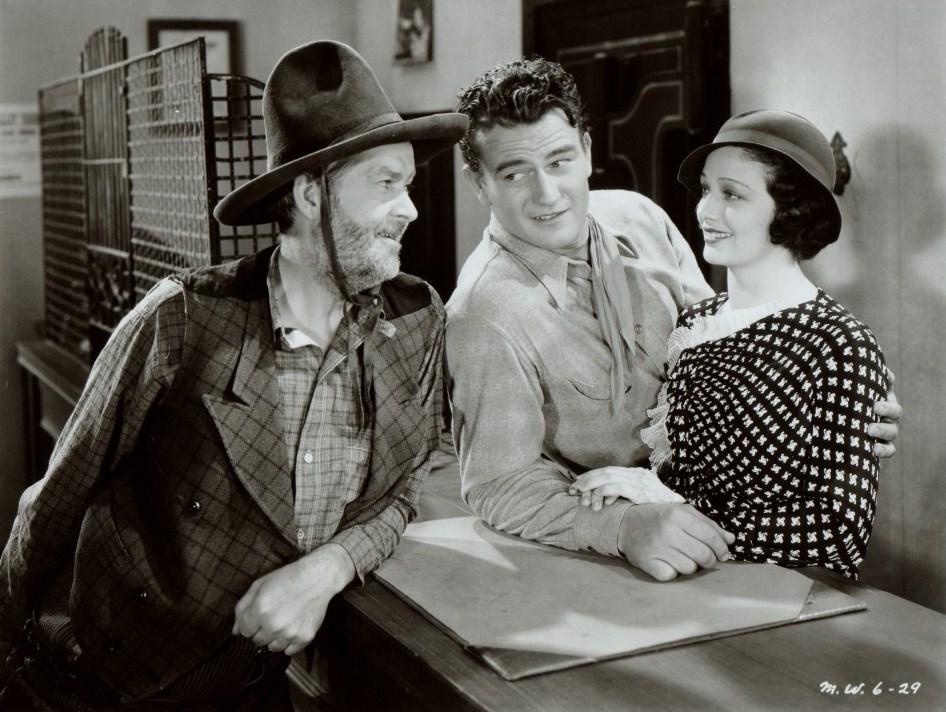
George 'Gabby' Hayes, John Wayne, and Eleanor Hunt in the film

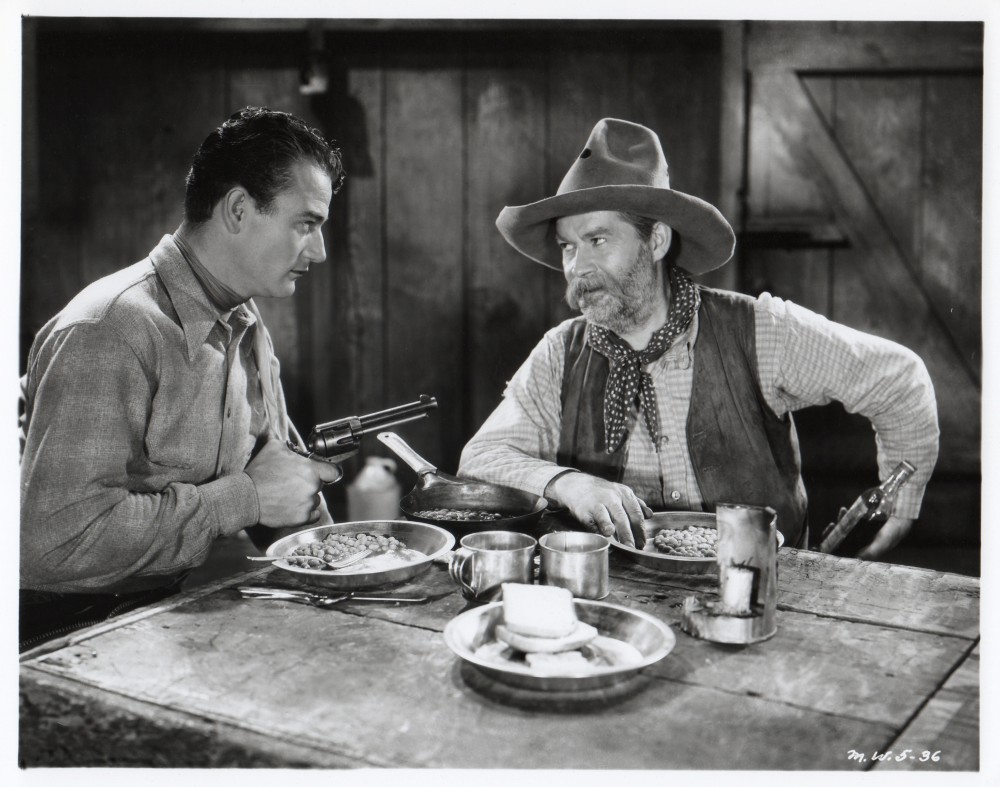
Gabby Hayes and John Wayne

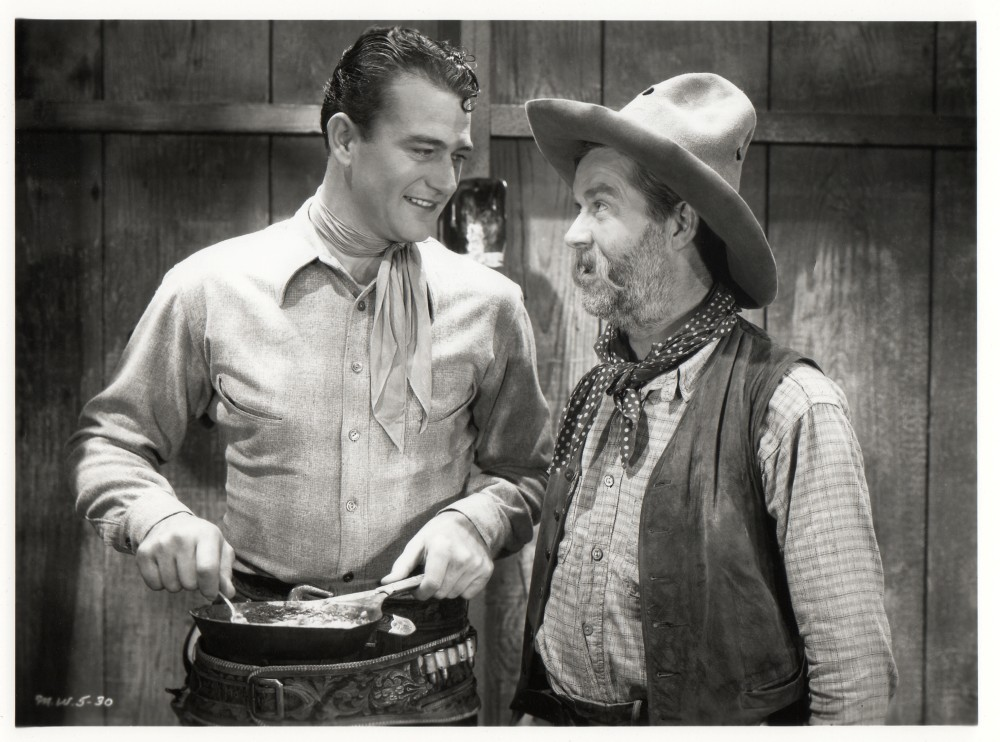
John Wayne and Gabby Hayes

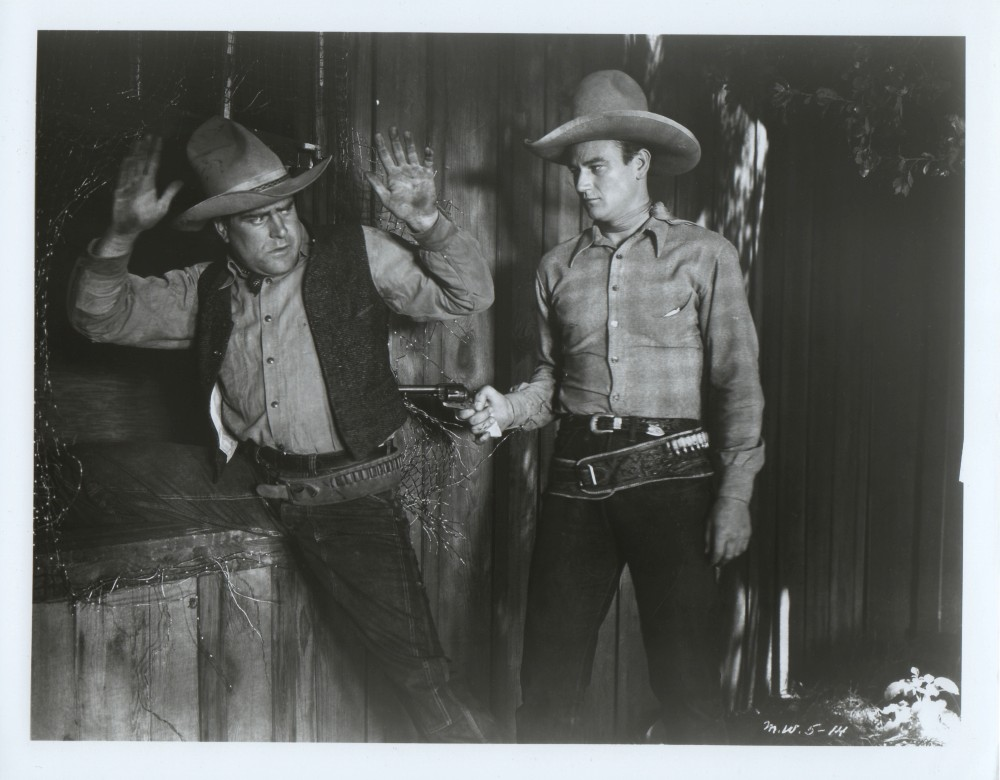
John Wayne holds gun on villain

John Carruthers is an undercover US Marshal. He appears to be in town investigating a string of robberies committed by the Polka Dot Bandit, but when he is a little late in discovering one of the Bandit's thefts, Sheriff Jake thinks Carruthers is the thief. For some reason, instead of arresting him, Jake accompanies him on his journey; after all, as Carruthers says, "It's kind of lonesome trailing alone."

The two stumble upon a gang robbing a pack-mule train; they rescue Betty Mason, whose father has just been killed by the bandits. She and her father were bringing desperately needed provisions to town, but the bandits have successfully cut off any supplies, forcing the townspeople to consider fleeing their homes or starving to death.

It turns out that the local rich man, Malgrove, is behind the robberies. He knows there's a vein of gold underneath the homesteaders' property, and he offers out of the kindness of his heart to purchase their land for a pittance. When the grieving Betty overhears his plans, Malgrove and his henchmen kidnap her. Carruthers and Jake offer to make one last attempt to bring supplies in, and Malgrove and his henchmen make plans to murder them.

== Cast ==
- John Wayne as John Carruthers
- Eleanor Hunt as Betty Mason
- George "Gabby" Hayes as Sheriff Jake Withers
- Edward Peil as Malgrove
- Yakima Canutt as Danti, the Polka Dot Bandit
- Lafe McKee as Dan Mason
- George Cleveland as Hank, innkeeper
- Earl Dwire as Henchman
- Chris Allen as Townsman
- Silver Tip Baker as Townsman
- Barney Beasley as Townsman
- Hank Bell as Stage Driver with Payroll
- Ralph Bucko as Townsman
- Horace B. Carpenter as Townsman
- Lane Chandler as Townsman
- Jack Evans as Townsman
- Herman Hack as Henchman
- Henry Hall as Townsman
- Theodore Lorch as Townsman
- Bud McClure as Townsman
- Art Mix as Townsman
- Perry Murdock as Henchman
- George Nash as The Bridegroom
- Herman Nowlin as Townsman
- Artie Ortego as Henchman
- Tex Phelps as Henchman

== See also ==
- John Wayne filmography
- List of American films of 1934
