= The Lawless Frontier =

1934 film

- Theatrical poster
- Directed by: Robert N. Bradbury
- Screenplay by: Robert North Bradbury
- Starring: John Wayne
- Cinematography: Archie Stout
- Edited by: Charles Hunt
- Distributed by: Monogram Pictures
- Release date: November 22, 1934
- Running time: 59 minutes
- Country: United States
- Language: English

The Lawless Frontier is a 1934 American Monogram Western film directed by Robert N. Bradbury and starring John Wayne, Sheila Terry, George "Gabby" Hayes, and Earl Dwire. It was the tenth of the Lone Star westerns. The picture was made on a budget of $11,000, shot in less than a week at Red Rock Canyon north of Los Angeles, and released by Monogram on Nov. 22, 1934. The film remains an unusual showcase for Earl Dwire in the lead villain's role.

== Plot ==
Aged prospector Dusty and his vivacious granddaughter Ruby have a ranch. A treacherous gang of crooks led by the notorious Pandro Santi have designs on the girl. When Santi shows up with a horse as a gift for Ruby, as a prelude to an abduction, he finds the ranch deserted. There is a secret passage from the house, and the girl used it to overhear the gang’s plans. Her father trusses her up like cargo, and straps her on the back of a horse and gets away from the gang. On their way into town, they cross a river and the girl almost drowns, saved by stranger John Tobin. Together they elude the outlaws and make it to town. The sheriff is suspicious that Tobin is part of Santi’s gang, or a freelance bandit out on his own. Tobin sneaks off to go after the bandits. He captures Santi after separating him from the gang end presents him to the sheriff.

After some implausible events, Santi escapes, and Tobin once more is suspected of being a bandit. Escaping an arrest and confinement, he follows Santi into the desert, and catches up in time to see the outlaw reach a grisly end. The rest of the gang are rounded up and Tobin ends the story as the new sheriff, married to the girl.

== Cast ==
- John Wayne as John Tobin
- Sheila Terry as Ruby
- Jack Rockwell as Sheriff Luke Williams
- George "Gabby" Hayes as Dusty (credited as George Hayes)
- Earl Dwire as Pandro Zanti, alias Don Yorba
- Jay Wilsey as second Zanti henchman (credited as Buffalo Bill Jr.)
- Yakima Canutt as Joe, Zanti's henchman
- Gordon De Main as Deputy Miller (credited as Bud Wood)

== See also ==
- John Wayne filmography
- List of American films of 1934
