= Carl Pierson =

American film editor

- Born: Carl Leo Pierson; June 26, 1891; Indianapolis, Indiana, USA
- Died: February 11, 1977 (aged 85); Los Angeles, California, USA
- Occupation(s): Film editor, director, producer
- Spouses: Minerva Jane Sherwood (divorced) Mary (divorced)

Carl Leo Pierson (1891–1977) was an American film editor who edited more than 200 films (primarily low-budget Westerns for Monogram and Republic) and television episodes over the course of his lengthy career in Hollywood. He also produced and directed a handful of movies.

== Biography ==
Carl Pierson was born in Indianapolis, Indiana. He was married at least twice: first Minerva Jane Sherwood in 1924, who filed for divorce in 1930; and then to an actress Mary; she sued for divorce in 1939. He had a daughter, Lois, with his first wife.

== Filmography (as editor) ==
- That Tennessee Beat (1966)
- Hand of Death (1962)
- Womanhunt (1962)
- The Two Little Bears (1961)
- The Silent Call (1961)
- The Little Shepherd of Kingdom Come (1961)
- Sniper's Ridge (1961)
- Diamond Safari (1958)
- She Devil (1958)
- Stagecoach to Fury (1956)
- Naked Gun (1956)
- Yaqui Drums (1956)
- Massacre (1956)
- The Big Chase (1954)
- The Black Pirates (1954)
- Sins of Jezebel (1953)
- The Great Jesse James Raid (1952)
- Leave It to the Marines (1951)
- Savage Drums (1951)
- Little Big Horn (1951)
- Pier 23 (1951)
- Roaring City (1951)
- Mask of the Dragon (1951)
- Fingerprints Don't Lie (1951)
- Three Desperate Men (1951)
- Bandit Queen (1950)
- Border Rangers (1950)
- Train to Tombstone (1950)
- Gunfire (1950)
- I Shot Billy the Kid (1950)
- Western Pacific Agent (1950)
- Radar Secret Service (1950)
- Roaring Westward (1949)
- Brand of Fear (1949)
- Gun Law Justice (1949)
- Courtin' Trouble (1948)
- Outlaw Brand (1948)
- Cowboy Cavalier (1948)
- Why Girls Leave Home (1945)
- Dangerous Intruder (1945)
- Minstrel Man (1944)
- Block Busters (1944)
- Return of the Ape Man (1944)
- Follow the Leader (1944)
- Voodoo Man (1944)
- Million Dollar Kid (1944)
- Raiders of the Border (1944)
- Death Valley Rangers (1943)
- The Crime Smasher (1943)
- The Texas Kid (1943)
- Mr. Muggs Steps Out (1943)
- Outlaws of Stampede Pass (1943)
- Spotlight Scandals (1943)
- Here Comes Kelly (1943)
- The Law Rides Again (1943)
- Ghosts on the Loose (1943)
- Wings Over the Pacific (1943)
- The Stranger from Pecos (1943)
- Sarong Girl (1943)
- Clancy Street Boys (1943)
- The Ape Man (1943)
- Kid Dynamite (1943)
- You Can't Beat the Law (1943)
- Dawn on the Great Divide (1942)
- Rhythm Parade (1942)
- 'Neath Brooklyn Bridge (1942)
- Bowery at Midnight (1942)
- City of Silent Men (1942)
- Down Texas Way (1942)
- Inside the Law (1942)
- Ghost Town Law (1942)
- Black Dragons (1942)
- Mr. Wise Guy (1942)
- Below the Border (1942)
- Caught in the Act (1941)
- Forbidden Trails (1941)
- Double Trouble (1941)
- Road to Happiness (1941)
- The Gunman from Bodie (1941)
- Reg'lar Fellers (1941)
- Arizona Bound (1941)
- That Gang of Mine (1940)
- Boys of the City (1940)
- The Mad Empress (1939)
- Sky Patrol (1939)
- Stunt Pilot (1939)
- Double Deal (1939)
- Wolf Call (1939)
- Mystery Plane (1939)
- The Phantom Stage (1939)
- Ghost Town Riders (1938)
- King of the Sierras (1938)
- Prairie Justice (1938)
- Paroled from the Big House (1938)
- Guilty Trails (1938)
- Black Bandit (1938)
- Rebellious Daughters (1938)
- Where the West Begins (1938)
- Spirit of Youth (1938)
- Western Gold (1937)
- The Outer Gate (1937)
- The Legion of Missing Men (1937)
- The Californian (1937)
- Reefer Madness (1936)
- I Cover Chinatown (1936)
- Red River Valley (1936)
- Frisco Waterfront (1935)
- Lawless Range (1935)
- Cappy Ricks Returns (1935)
- Westward Ho (1935)
- Honeymoon Limited (1935)
- The Dawn Rider (1935)
- The Hoosier Schoolmaster (1935)
- The Desert Trail (1935)
- The Nut Farm (1935)
- Rainbow Valley (1935)
- The Mystery Man (1935)
- Texas Terror (1935)
- Sing Sing Nights (1934)
- 'Neath the Arizona Skies (1934)
- Flirting with Danger (1934)
- Lost in the Stratosphere (1934)
- A Girl of the Limberlost (1934)
- Tomorrow's Youth (1934)
- Happy Landing (1934)
- Jane Eyre (1934)
- The Star Packer (1934)
- Million Dollar Baby (1934)
- Randy Rides Alone (1934)
- Monte Carlo Nights (1934)
- The Man from Utah (1934)
- Blue Steel (1934)
- Manhattan Love Song (1934)
- House of Mystery (1934)
- Mystery Liner (1934)
- West of the Divide (1934)
- A Woman's Man (1934)
- The Lucky Texan (1934)
- Sixteen Fathoms Deep (1934)
- Trailing North (1933)
- Sagebrush Trail (1933)
- Broken Dreams (1933)
- Riders of Destiny (1933)
- The Devil's Mate (1933)
- Galloping Romeo (1933)
- The Gallant Fool (1933)
- The Return of Casey Jones (1933)
- Diamond Trail (1933)
- Wine, Women and Song (1933)
- The Phantom Broadcast (1933)
- Breed of the Border (1933)
- The Fugitive (1933)
- West of Singapore (1933)
- Sensation Hunters (1933)
- A Strange Adventure (1932)
- The Girl from Calgary (1932)
- The Man from Arizona (1932)
- Broadway to Cheyenne (1932)
- Hidden Valley (1932)
- Son of Oklahoma (1932)
- The Arm of the Law (1932)
- Honor of the Mounted (1932)
- The Man from Hell's Edges (1932)
- Vanishing Men (1932)
- Police Court (1932)
- The Law of the Sea (1931)
- The Florodora Girl (1930)
- Montana Moon (1930)
- The Mysterious Island (1929)
- The Baby Cyclone (1928)
- Rose-Marie (1928)
