= Western Justice =

1934 film

- Directed by: Robert N. Bradbury
- Written by: Robert N. Bradbury
- Starring: Bob Steele
- Production company: Supreme Pictures
- Release date: December 12, 1934
- Running time: 56 minutes
- Country: United States
- Language: English

Western Justice is a 1934 American Western film directed by Robert N. Bradbury and starring Bob Steele. Steele sings in the film. Scenes were shot around Buena Vista Lake.

== Plot ==
Three strangers—each riding the range for his own personal reasons—converge on an isolated, abandoned cabin in the arid West. Wary at first, they cautiously share the space and, to avoid revealing their true identities or pasts, adopt playing-card inspired aliases: Ace (Bob Steele), King (Lafe McKee), and Jack (Julian Rivero).

Bonding over their shared predicament and mutual distrust turning to camaraderie, the trio discovers a common cause when they arrive in a drought-stricken valley town. Ruthless land and cattle baron interests have diverted the vital water supply to force struggling homesteaders and small ranchers off their land, aiming to seize control for profit or expansion. The desperate settlers are on the verge of ruin without irrigation.

The three mysterious drifters—revealing their skills as capable gunmen and resourceful men—decide to team up and fight for justice. They work to expose the water-grabbing scheme, rally the beleaguered townsfolk, and confront the outlaws and henchmen who enforce the tyrant's will through intimidation, rustling, and violence.

The trio outwits and the bad guys, restores the water flow to the valley, brings the culprits to justice, and earns the gratitude of the settlers—allowing Ace, King, and Jack to ride off into the sunset.

== Cast ==
- Bob Steele as Jim, alias Ace
- Rene Borden as Bee Brent (as Renee Borden)
- Julian Rivero as Pancho Lopez, alias Jack
- Arthur Loft as Clem W. Slade
- Lafe McKee as Sheriff, alias King
- John Cowell as John Brent (as Jack Cowell)
- Perry Murdock as Rufe
- Vane Calvert as Aunt Emma
