= Westward Ho (1935 film) =

1935 film

- Film poster
- Directed by: Robert N. Bradbury
- Written by: Robert Emmett Tansey; Lindsley Parsons; Harry Friedman
- Produced by: Paul Malvern
- Starring: John Wayne
- Cinematography: Archie Stout
- Edited by: Carl Pierson
- Distributed by: Republic Pictures
- Release date: August 19, 1935
- Running time: 61 minutes
- Country: United States
- Language: English
- Budget: $17,000
- Box office: $500,000

Westward Ho is a 1935 American Western film directed by Robert N. Bradbury and starring John Wayne and Sheila Bromley. It was released by the recently created Republic Pictures and was produced by Paul Malvern, who had previously produced several of Wayne's Westerns under the Lonestar Productions division of Monogram Pictures. Many consider the film among the earliest revisionist Westerns.

== Plot ==
Whit Ballard and his gang of outlaws steal a herd of cattle from the Wyatts, a family of drovers, murdering the parents. In the aftermath, Ballard takes young Jim Wyatt but leaves Jim's brother John. As an adult, to locate the men who killed his parents and kidnapped his brother, John organizes a vigilante group of cowboys, and they become renowned for their success.

John takes a job with a cattle-herding family and is attracted to the family's sassy daughter Mary. Jim, using the surname Allen and unrecognized by John, has also infiltrated the family, but his goal is to gather information for Ballard to assist in stealing the cattle. John is suspicious and departs in the middle of the night, returning with his vigilantes in time to foil the outlaws' plan to rob the family. In the confusion of the conflict, Jim creates the appearance that he had saved the father and stays unknown as Ballard's confidant. Interrogating one of the outlaws, John discovers that Ballard is the man responsible for killing his family. He frees the outlaw but warns him to avoid the town where Ballard is based. However, when John heads to town, he recognizes the same outlaw. He starts a fight, but other outlaws appear and he is badly outnumbered. John escapes over rooftops, riding to again retrieve his vigilantes.

Jim tricks Mary into visiting Ballard's hideout, where she is locked into a room. Ballard sends a ransom note to John instructing him to come alone to a canyon if he wants to save Mary. When John receives the note, he rides alone to the canyon, leaving the vigilantes behind. Ballard's gang steals gold from the town bank and heads to the canyon. Jim sees them ride away, abandoning him, and goes to the hideout, where he frees Mary, who tells him that she overheard Ballard saying that John is his Jim's brother.

Knowing that a trap awaits John at the canyon, Jim rides there while Mary rides to retrieve the vigilantes. Jim arrives at the canyon, and as John arrives, Jim yells to warn him of the trap and stalls the waiting outlaws in a shootout. Jim joins John and informs him that they are brothers, and they try to escape on horseback. Their path intersects with Ballard in a wagon with the stolen gold just as the vigilantes also arrive and engage the outlaws in a mobile shootout on horseback. John jumps aboard the wagon and fights Ballard, jumping from it just before the wagon careens down an embankment, killing Ballard. John rushes back to Jim, who has been shot, and Jim dies in John's arms.

John tells Mary that he is disbanding the group and leaving to become a California rancher.

== Cast ==
- John Wayne as John Wyatt
- Sheila Bromley as Mary Gordon
- Frank McGlynn Jr. as Jim Wyatt
- Jim Farley as Lafe Gordon (herd owner)
- Jack Curtis as Whit Ballard
- Bradley Metcalfe as John Wyatt as a child
- Dickie Jones as Jim Wyatt as a child
- Mary MacLaren as Ma Wyatt
- Yakima Canutt as Red (Ballard henchman)
- Hank Bell as Mark Wyatt
- Glenn Strange as Carter (singing rider)
