= West of the Divide =

1934 film

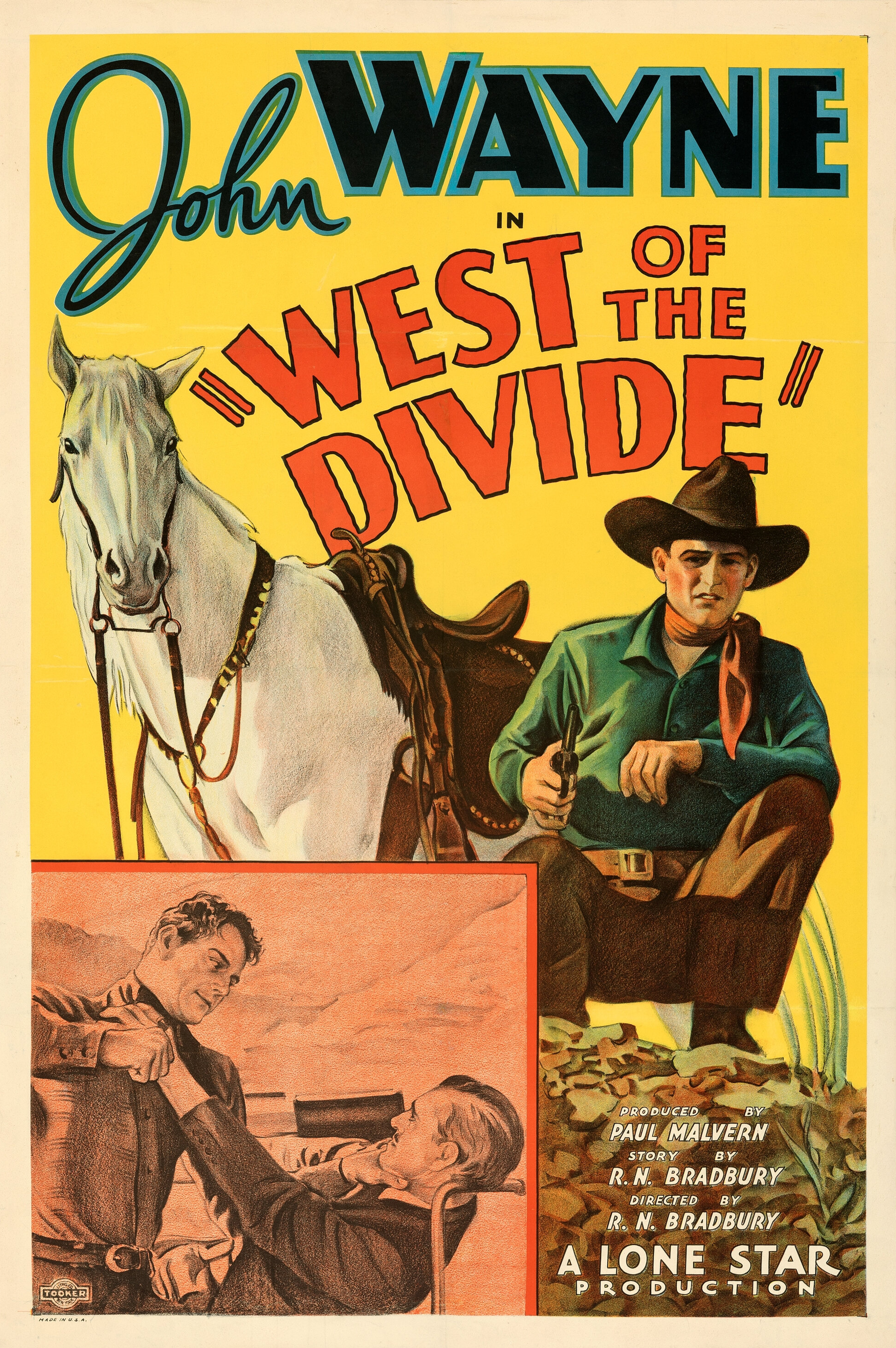
- Film poster
- Directed by: Robert N. Bradbury
- Written by: Robert N. Bradbury; Oliver Drake
- Produced by: Paul Malvern
- Starring: John Wayne
- Cinematography: Archie Stout
- Edited by: Carl Pierson
- Production company: Lone Star Productions
- Distributed by: Monogram Pictures
- Release date: February 15, 1934
- Running time: 54 minutes
- Country: United States
- Language: English

West of the Divide is a 1934 American Western film directed by Robert N. Bradbury for Monogram, and starring John Wayne, Yakima Canutt and Gabby Hayes. The film had a copyright notice upon release, but it was not renewed.

== Plot ==
The film

Ted Hayden poses as the deceased killer Gat Ganns in order to learn the identity of his father's murderer and to find his long-lost kid brother.

== Trivia ==
The film is best looked up by the year 1934 but on opening credits, it says in Roman Numberals, 1933. it displays a 1933 copyright date (MCMXXXIII) in Roman numerals on its opening credits. This is most probably due to copyright Registration: Lone Star Productions and Monogram Pictures registered the title and finalized the film print before the end of the calendar year. Most of the filming took place near Bakersfield California, Kernville, CA: Located in the Sierra Nevada foothills of the Kern River Valley.

== Cast ==
- John Wayne as Ted Hayden, posing as Gat Ganns
- Virginia Brown Faire as Fay Winters
- George "Gabby" Hayes as "Dusty" Rhodes
- Lloyd Whitlock as Mr. Gentry
- Yakima Canutt as Hank (Gentry henchman)
- Lafe McKee as Mr. Winters
- Billy O'Brien as Spuds (later Jim Hayden)
- Dick Dickinson as henchman Joe
- Earl Dwire as sheriff

== See also ==
- John Wayne filmography
