= Archie Stout =

American cinematographer

- Born: Archibald Job Stout; March 30, 1886; Renwick, Iowa, US
- Died: March 10, 1973 (aged 86); Los Angeles, California, US
- Occupation: Cinematographer
- Years active: 1914–1954
- Spouse(s): Laura Grace Fuller (married 1900s–1910s); Evelyn M. Stout (1920s); Bernice Viola Weston (1930s–1954)
- Children: 1

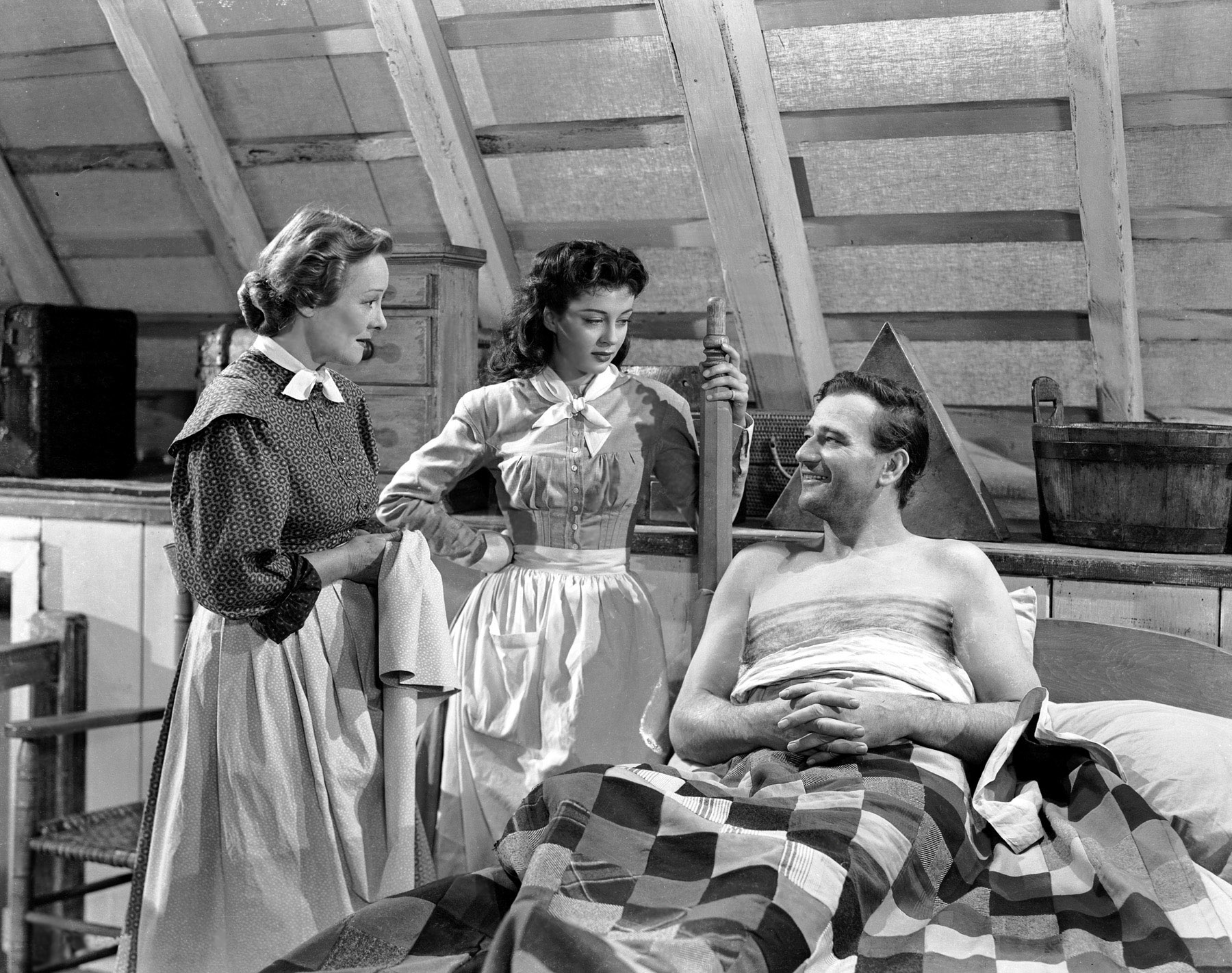
Left to right: Irene Rich, Gail Russell, and John Wayne in Angel and the Badman (1947).

Archibald Job Stout (March 30, 1886 – March 10, 1973), ASC was an American cinematographer whose career spanned from 1914 to 1954. He enjoyed a long and fruitful association with John Ford, working as the principal cinematographer on Fort Apache (1948) and second unit cinematographer on She Wore a Yellow Ribbon (1949) and The Quiet Man (1952), becoming the only 2nd unit cinematographer to receive an Oscar. In a wide-ranging career, he also worked on such films as the original version of The Ten Commandments (1923) and several Hopalong Cassidy and Tarzan films. His last film was the airborne disaster movie The High and the Mighty in 1954.

== Personal life ==
Archibald "Archie" Job Stout was born in Renwick, Iowa, to Frank and Mary Stout on March 30, 1886. He had one younger sister, Bessie A. Stout, who was born in 1887.

Archie Stout was married three times. First, to Ms. Laura Grace Fuller. The couple had one son together, Junius "Junior" Stout on April 16, 1910, in San Diego, California. Stout and Fuller divorced, and Archie would go on to marry Evelyn M. Stout during much of the 1920s. However, this marriage did not last, and the couple divorced. By the 1930s, Archie had met and wed Bernice Viola Weston. She was fourteen years younger than Stout, but the two remained married until Archie's death in 1973.

== Career ==
From an early age, Archie Stout knew he wanted to travel, and so he sought work that catered to this desires. He worked in hotel management in Japan and Honolulu, and in 1909, he was chosen to be "secretary to the commission in charge of the Hawaiian exhibit at the American Yukon Expedition". Archie then moved on to Los Angeles to try his hand at working in real estate, but this venture did not last long, and instead he began to work as a forest ranger.

In 1914, Mack Sennett was filming a comedy with Louise Fazenda, and it required a scene with a pelican "nibbling at [Louise's] posterior". However, the state law in California required that a representative of the fish and game committee be present at all times when handling the pelican. Archie was game warden of the fish and game commission of California at the time, and was assigned to oversee the handling of a pelican. However, several days after the scene with the pelican, Stout continued to observe and speak to Mack Sennett and his lead cameraman, Fred Jackman, throughout the rest of the shoot. Jackman, taking a liking to Stout, and in need of background shots, asked if Stout would be interested in getting the shots for him. Stout eagerly agreed, and after a brief lesson on how the camera worked, went up into the High Sierras to get the shots. Once the film was developed, Jackman saw the potential in Stout's abilities and hired him immediately.

While Stout worked as a comedy cameraman for Sennett for several years, it was not until 1923 that he was given the chance to work branch out of comedies. Bert Glennon, Cecil B. DeMille's cameraman, allowed Archie to do experimental shots with his Akeley camera with a 17-inch telephoto lens. While viewing rushes with DeMille and his crew, Archie recalls when one of his shots came on the screen:

It was so fuzzy you could hardly figure out what it was. It was sure out of focus. The voice of DeMille boomed out, "Who made that shot?"

Without hesitation, I said, "I did. But it came out that way because my camera was out of focus."

DeMille laughed uproariously and exclaimed, "That's the first time I ever heard a cameraman admit he was responsible for a bad shot."

DeMille hired Archie to be a "free agent" on his next film, The Ten Commandments (1923). This accomplishment led to a five-year contract with Famous Players–Lasky, and Archie said "goodbye to the film funnies".

By the 1930s, Stout was "earning a reputation for outstanding outdoor photography" and was moving between director of photography positions and second unit jobs. He would go on to develop a strong professional relationship with actor John Wayne, shooting at least 25 of his films, most of which were Westerns.

Stout eventually became a part of director John Ford's camera crew, working on Fort Apache (1948), She Wore a Yellow Ribbon (1949), Rio Grande (1950), Wagon Master (1950) and The Quiet Man (1952). Between his background with nature and his eye for exterior shots, Stout would go on to be "among the top dozen cinematographers associated with Westerns".

In an interview, Archie said in the first eight years of his career he "roughly made 300 pictures for Mack Sennett and the Christie boys". By the printing of the article, he would be shooting his 500th film. Although that is a staggering number of movies for a cinematographer, especially one well into his 50s, Archie was not too impressed with the number, saying that "in the old days a one-reeler was shot in two or three days, and as soon as you finished one you started right in with another".

Unfortunately, The High and the Mighty (Wellman, 1954) would be Stout's last film as a heart attack in 1955 would prevent him from returning to filmmaking before his death in 1973.

== Awards and nominations ==
Archie Stout was nominated and won his only Academy Award in 1952, for Best Color Cinematography, with Winton C. Hoch for their work on John Ford's The Quiet Man. Stout was 66 years old at the time. The Quiet Man, starring John Wayne and Maureen O'Hara, was nominated for seven Oscars, winning a total of four, including Best Director for John Ford.

== Tragedy ==
During World War II, Archie's son, Junius Job Stout, at the age of 31 enlisted with the U.S. Navy to be a photographer's mate, first class. He would be one of John Ford's lead cameramen at the Normandy landings. On October 30, 1944, Junior was killed in action as his unarmed airplane was flying over the island of Jersey. The German soldiers had seen the glint of the camera, and had thought it was a machine gun, and shot down the plane.

== Legacy ==
In an interview with American Cinematographer in 1945, Archie said:

"I actually believe my work with the Akeley was the father of all dolly shots, for until I made follow shots with that camera, our cameras never moved. With the introduction of camera movement, cameramen had the opportunity of improving their art. Mobility of the camera has done much for cinematography".

While this assessment is not proven, it is undeniable that Stout's exterior shots and Westerns will surely continue to impact the way filmmakers tell stories, specifically ones located in the great outdoors.

== Partial filmography ==
- The Ten Commandments (photographer) (1923)
- The Drivin' Fool (1923)
- Varsity (1928)
- Men Are Like That (photographer) (1929)
- Dangerous Paradise (1930)
- Young Eagles (1930)
- Manslaughter (1930)
- The Benson Murder Case (1930)
- The Return of Dr. Fu Manchu (1930)
- The Sea God (1930)
- Rider of the Plains (1931)
- Ships of Hate (1931)
- In Line of Duty (1931)
- Land of Wanted Men (1931)
- Forgotten Women (1931)
- Two Fisted Justice (1931)
- A Son of the Plains (1931)
- It Pays to Advertise (1931)
- Police Court (1932)
- Son of Oklahoma (1932)
- Ghost City (1932)
- Law of the North (1932)
- Hidden Valley (1932)
- Single-Handed Sanders (1932)
- The Man from Arizona (1932)
- South of Santa Fe (1932)
- The Arm of the Law (1932)
- Honor of the Mounted (1932)
- Heritage of the Desert (1932)
- The County Fair (1932)
- Young Blood (1932)
- Sagebrush Trail (photography) (1933)
- Under the Tonto Rim (photography) (1933)
- Sunset Pass (photography) (1933)
- Galloping Romeo (1933)
- The Fugitive (1933)
- Happy Landing (1934)
- Riders of Destiny (photography) (1933)
- The Man from Utah (photographed by) (1934)
- The Last Round-Up (1934)
- The Lawless Frontier (photography) (1934)
- The Trail Beyond (photography) (1934)
- Randy Rides Alone (photographed by) (1934)
- The Star Packer (photographed by) (1934)
- West of the Divide (1934)
- Blue Steel (photographed by) (1934)
- West of the Divide (photographed by) (1934)
- The Lucky Texan (photographed by) (1934)
- Flirting with Danger (1934)
- 'Neath the Arizona Skies (photography) (1934)
- Lawless Range (photography) (1935)
- Dark Waters (1935)
- Westward Ho (photography) (1935)
- Hop-a-long Cassidy (1935)
- Paradise Canyon (photography) (1935)
- The Dawn Rider (photography) (1935)
- The Desert Trail (photography) (1935)
- Texas Terror (photographed by, uncredited) (1935)
- Conflict (1936)
- Sea Spoilers (1936)
- The Hurricane (1937)
- Professor Beware (1938)
- Rulers of the Sea (1939)
- Beau Geste (1939)
- The Westerner (special effects photography) (1940)
- It Happened Tomorrow (1944)
- Tarzan and the Amazons (1945)
- Captain Kidd (1945)
- Abilene Town (director of photography) (1946)
- Angel and the Badman (photography) (1947)
- Tarzan and the Huntress (1947)
- Fort Apache (1948)
- She Wore a Yellow Ribbon (camera operator: second unit - uncredited) / (director of photography: second unit - uncredited) (1949)
- Rio Grande (second unit photography) (1950)
- Wagon Master (second unit photography) (1950)
- Outrage (1950)
- Never Fear (1950)
- Hard, Fast and Beautiful (1951)
- The Quiet Man (second unit photography) (1952)
- Big Jim McLain (director of photography) (1952)
- The Sun Shines Bright (1953)
- Hondo (photography) (1953)
- Island in the Sky (photographed by) (1953)
- Trouble Along the Way (director of photography) (1953)
- The High and the Mighty (photographed by) (1954)
