= John Wayne filmography =

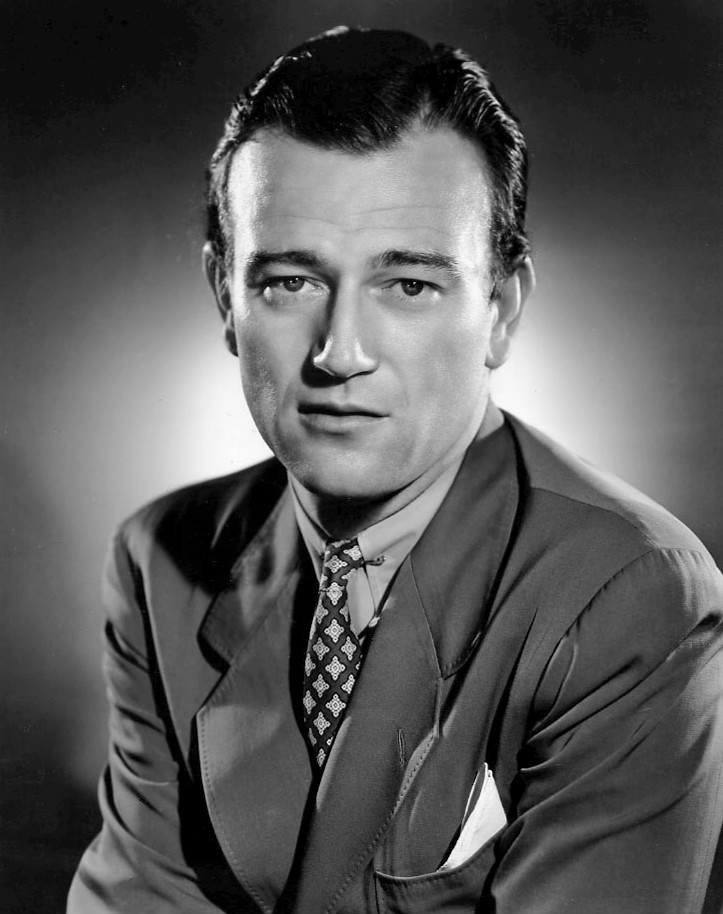
Publicity photo from The Long Voyage Home (1940)

American actor, director, and producer John Wayne (1907–1979) began working on films as an extra, prop man, and stuntman, mainly for the Fox Film Corporation. He frequently worked in minor roles with director John Ford and when Raoul Walsh suggested him for the lead in The Big Trail (1930), an epic Western shot in an early widescreen process called Fox Grandeur, Ford vouched for him. (Note: "The tall, commanding figure of the prop boy looked right for the part and, when John Ford vouched for Wayne's dedication to work, [Raoul] Walsh arranged a screen test.") Wayne's early period as a star was brief. Fox dropped him after only three leads. He then appeared in a string of low-budget action films (mostly Westerns) before garnering more recognition with the 1939 film Stagecoach.

During the 1940s and early 1950s, Wayne starred in Dark Command (1940), Reap the Wild Wind (1942), Wake of the Red Witch (1948), Fort Apache (1948), She Wore a Yellow Ribbon (1949), Rio Grande (1950), and Red River (1948). Some of his more notable war movies include Flying Tigers (1942), The Fighting Seabees (1944), They Were Expendable (1945), and Sands of Iwo Jima (1949), for which he was nominated for an Academy Award for Best Actor.

The 1950s had Wayne starring in an Ireland-set romantic comedy, The Quiet Man (1952), and two Westerns, The Searchers (1956) and Rio Bravo (1959). Wayne also continued his producing activities during this period, and formed his own production company, Batjac. During the 1960s and 1970s, Wayne starred in more Westerns, such as The Comancheros (1961), The Man Who Shot Liberty Valance (1962), El Dorado (1966), and True Grit (1969), in which his role as Rooster Cogburn earned him an Academy Award for Best Actor. He would reprise that role in the 1975 film Rooster Cogburn. He also appeared in several war films, including The Longest Day (1962) and In Harm's Way (1965).

Wayne starred in his final film, The Shootist, in 1976, ending his acting career of 50 years, 169 feature-length films, and various other television appearances or voice-overs.

== Filmography ==
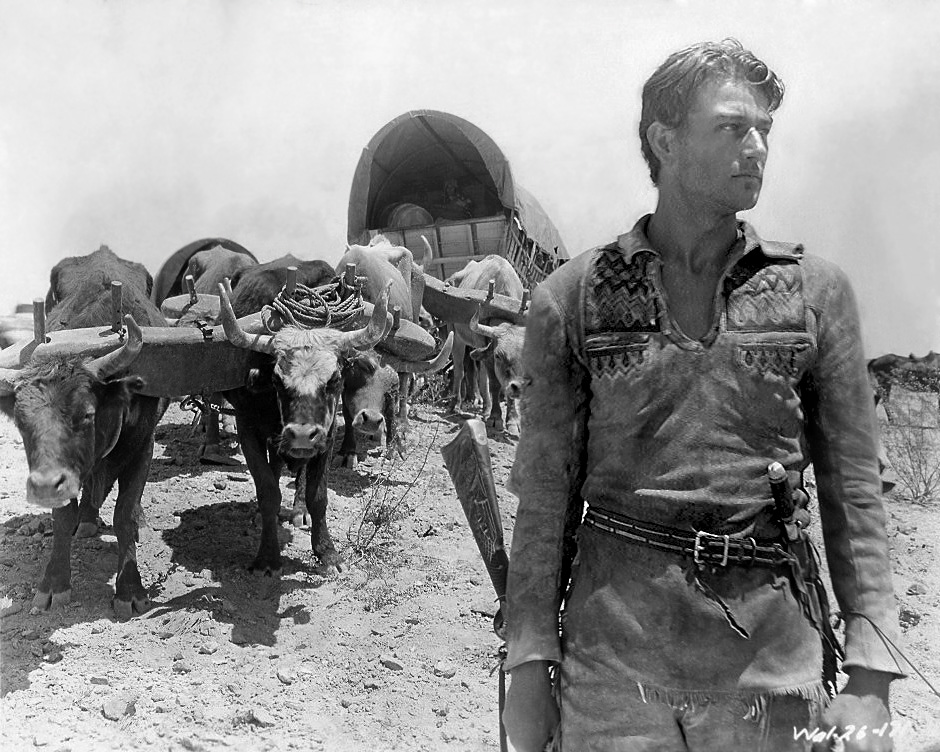
Wayne in The Big Trail (1930)

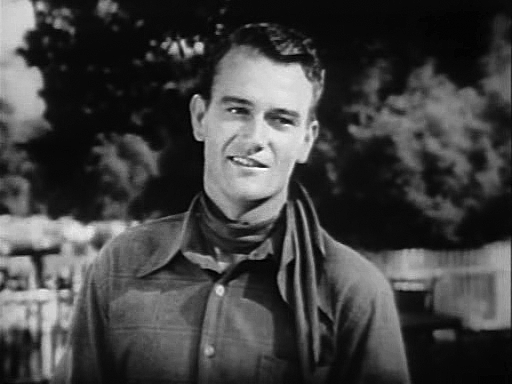
Wayne in Riders of Destiny (1933)

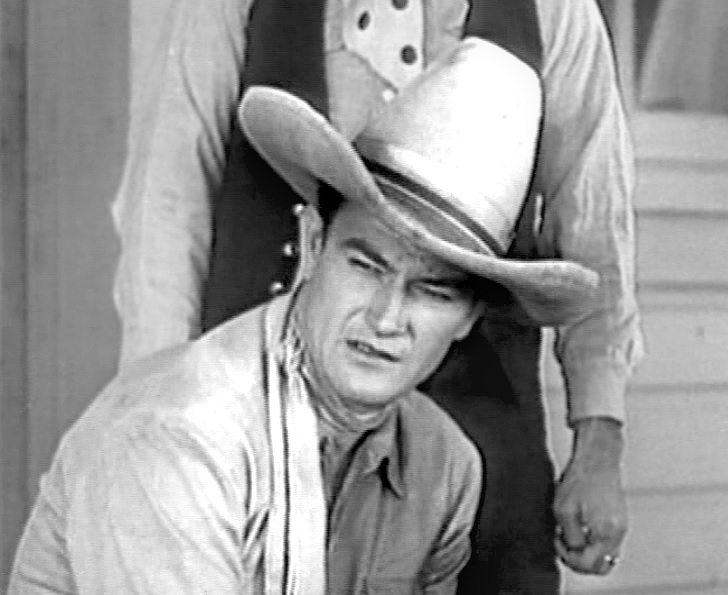
Wayne in The Star Packer (1934)

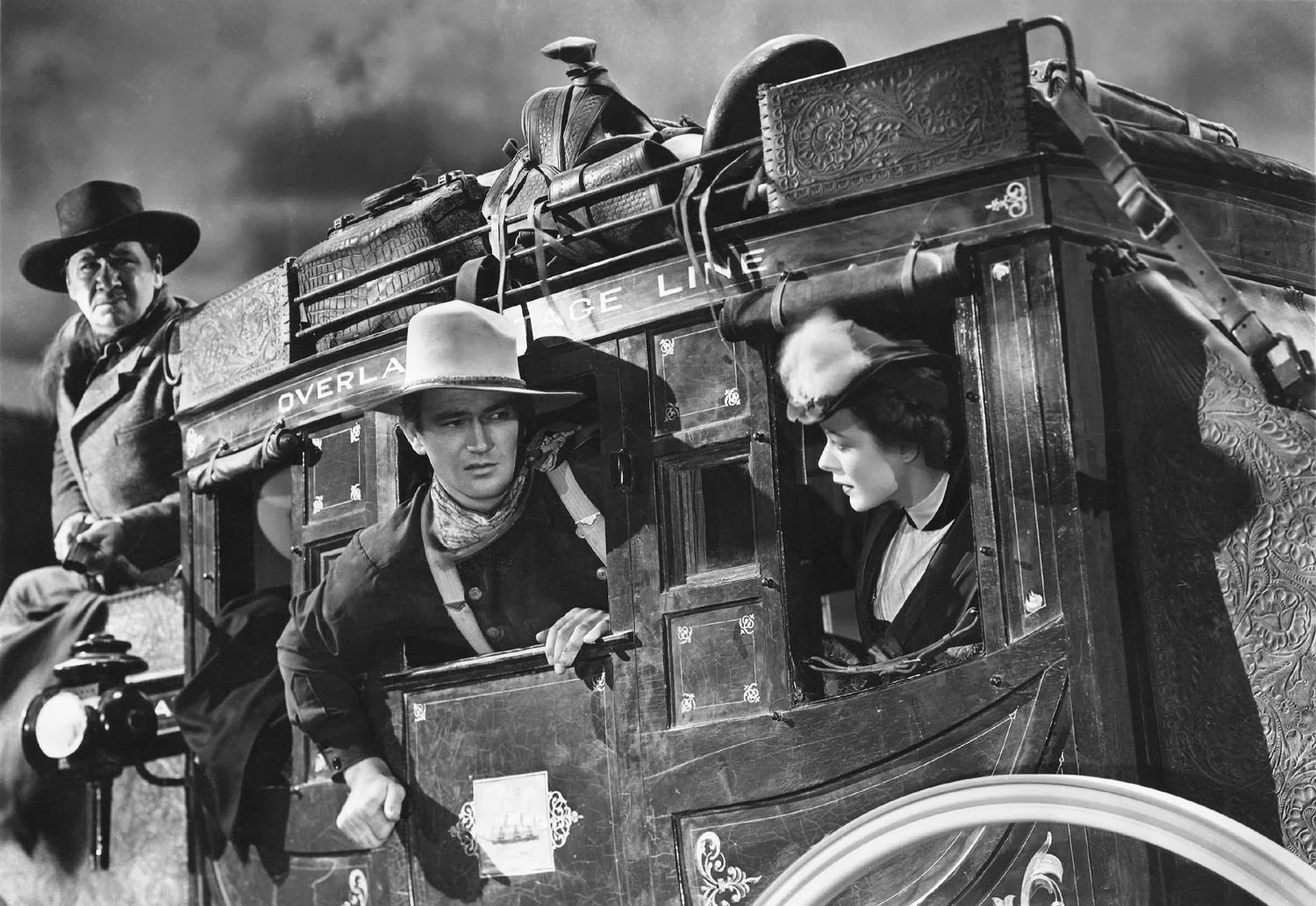
Publicity photo of Wayne, Louise Platt and George Bancroft in Stagecoach (1939)

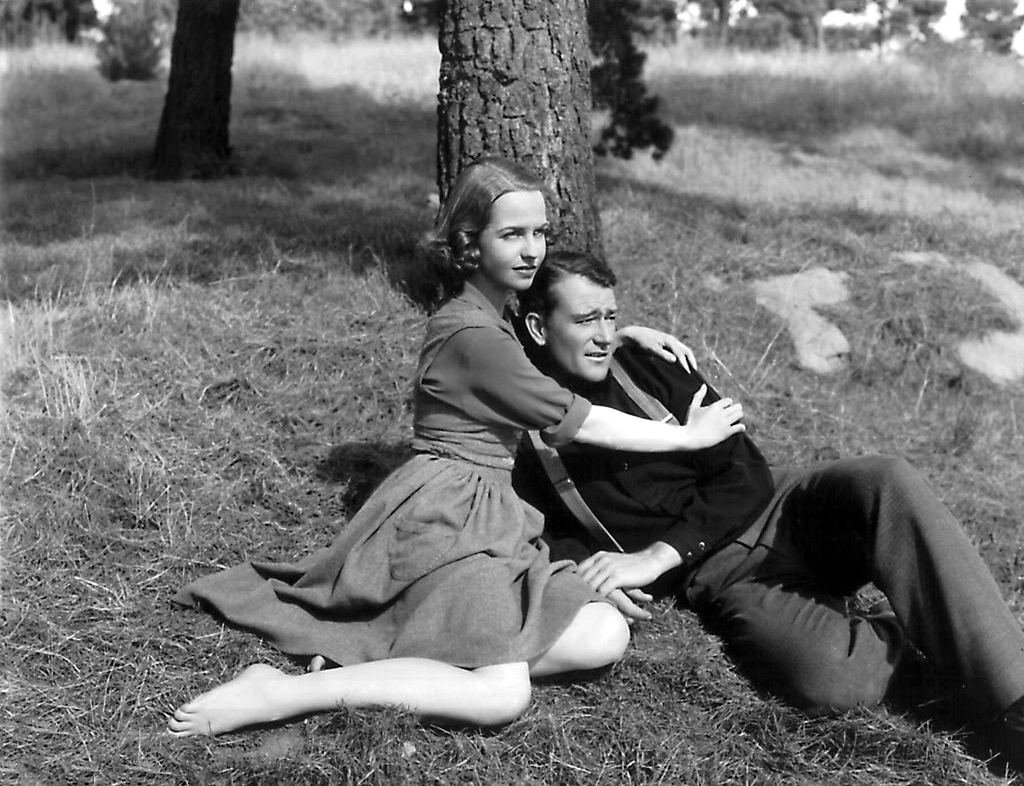
Betty Field and Wayne in The Shepherd of the Hills (1941)

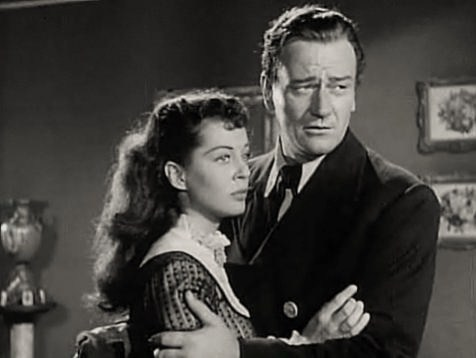
Gail Russell and Wayne in Wake of the Red Witch (1948)

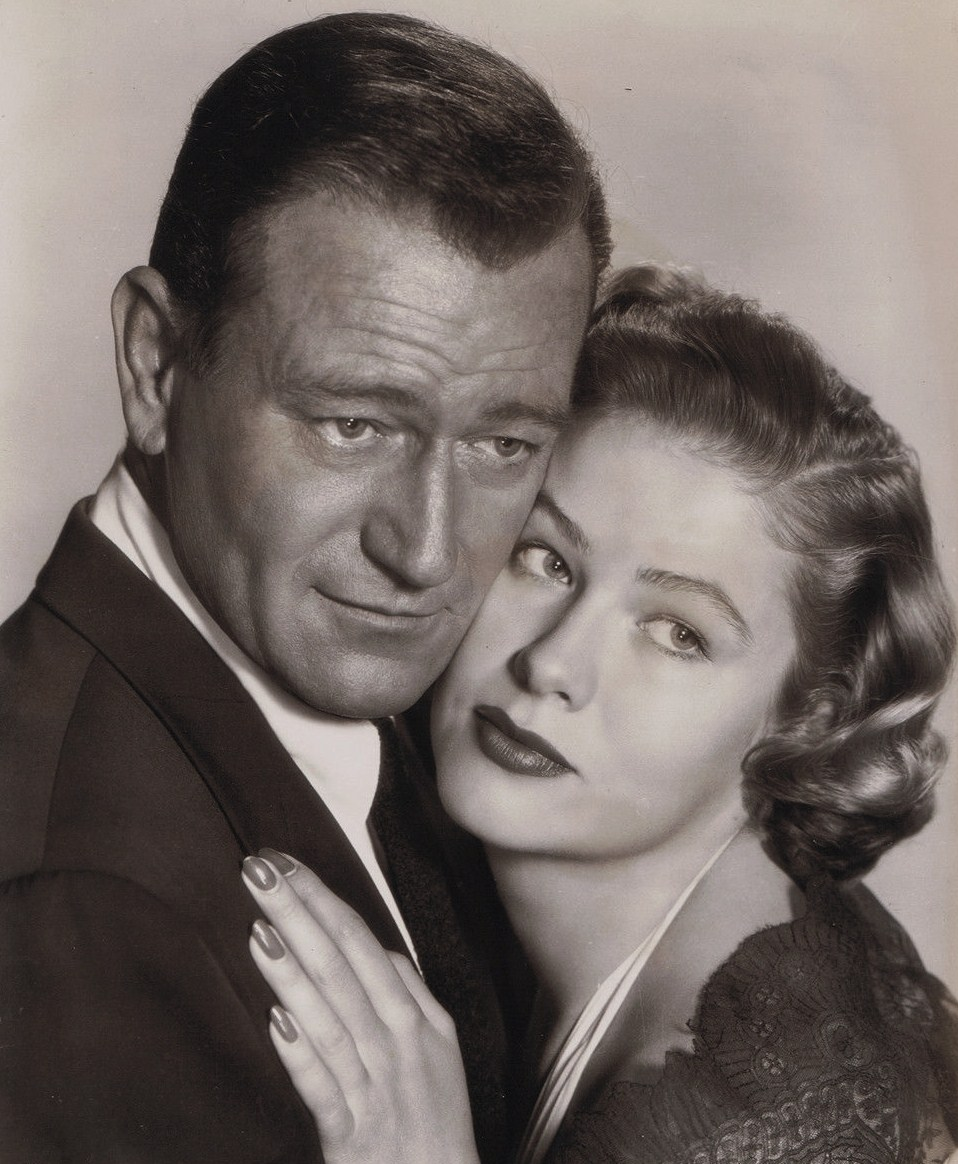
Publicity photo of Wayne and Nancy Olson for Big Jim McLain (1952)

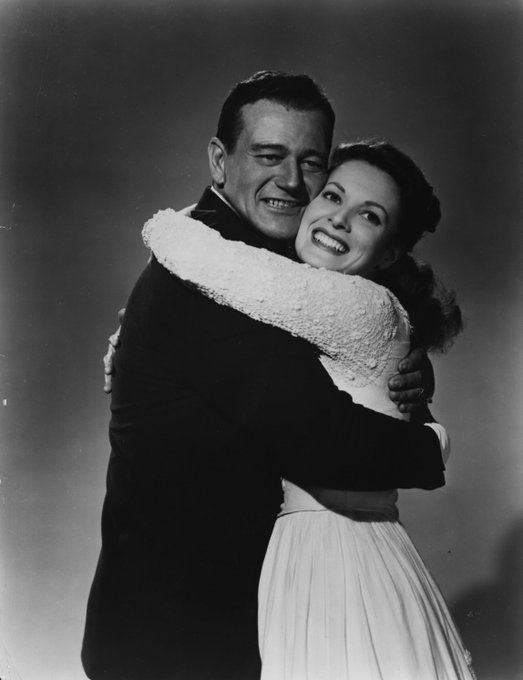
Publicity photo of Wayne and Maureen O'Hara for The Quiet Man (1952)

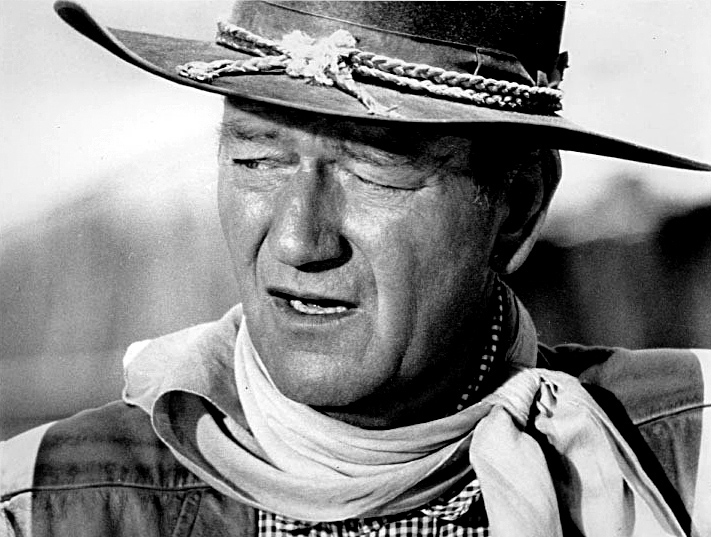
Wayne in The Comancheros (1961)

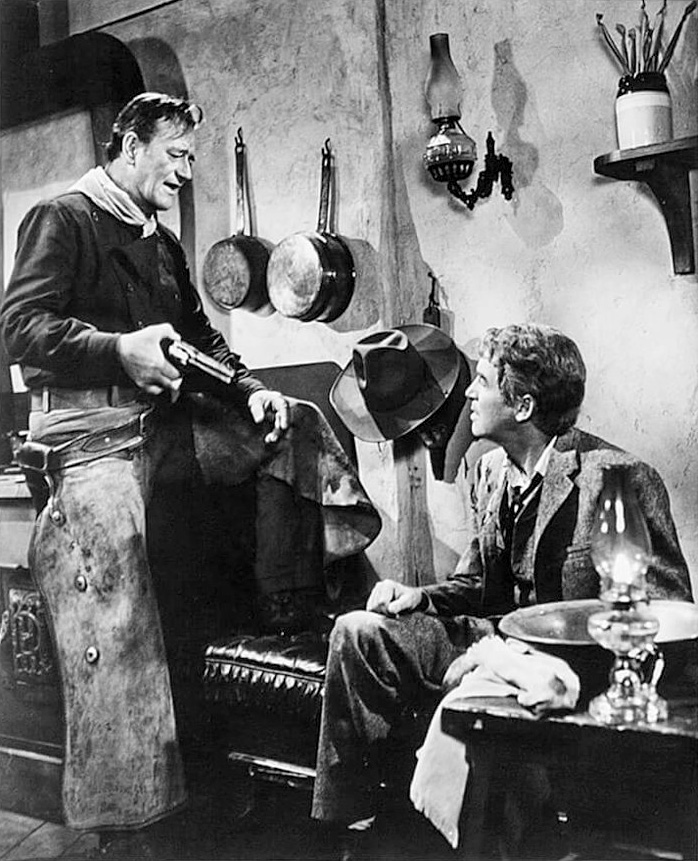
Wayne with James Stewart in The Man Who Shot Liberty Valance (1962)

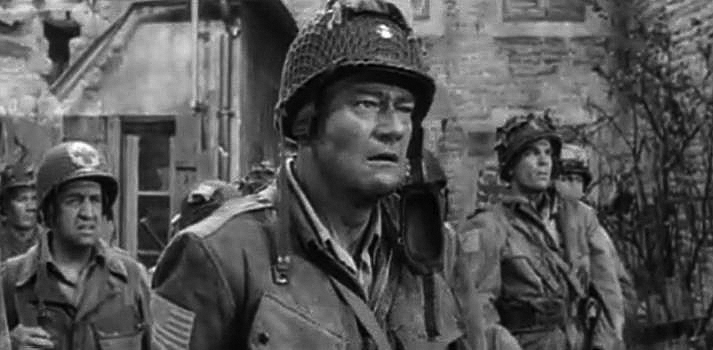
Wayne as Lt. Colonel Benjamin H. Vandervoort in The Longest Day (1962)

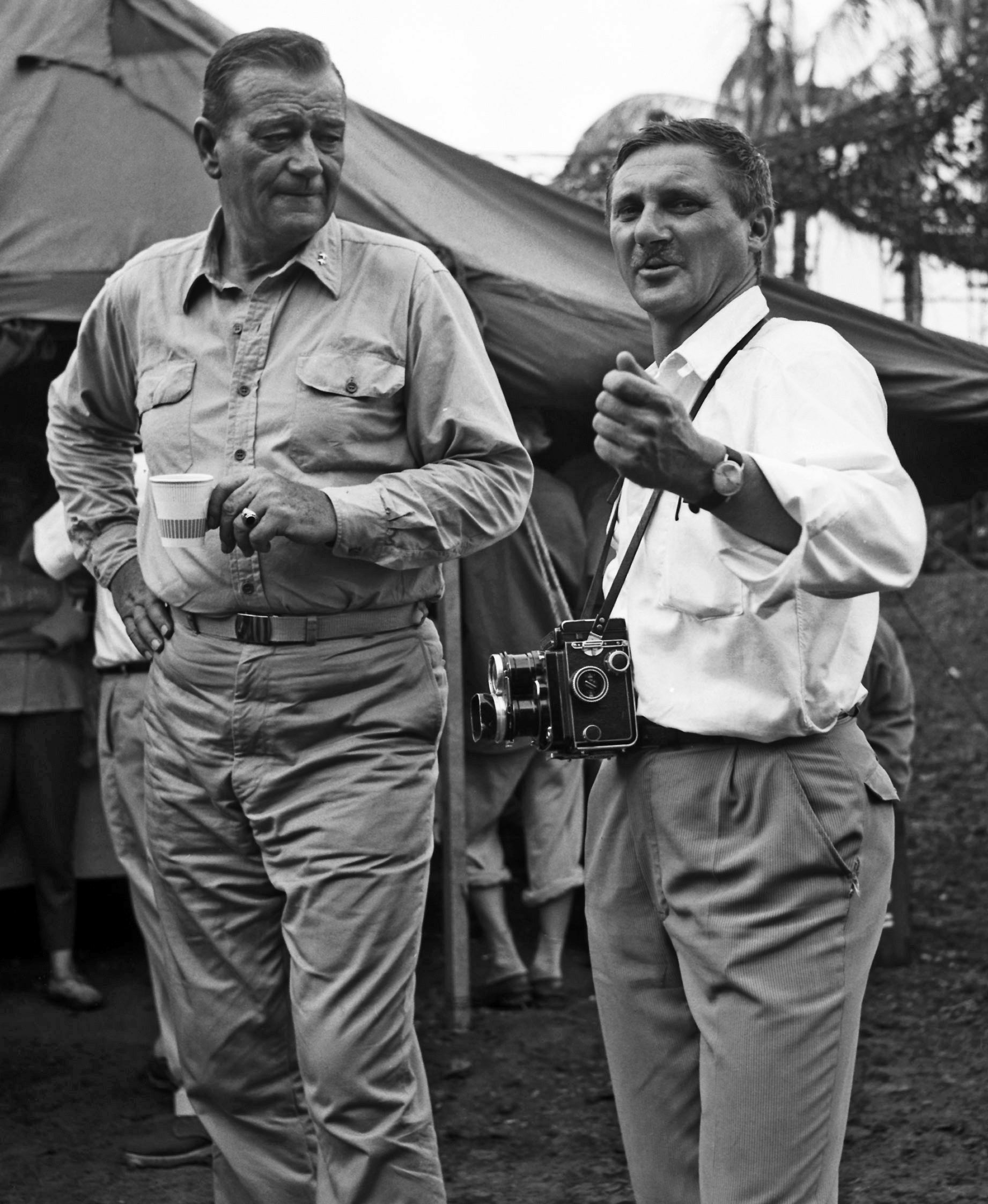
Wayne with photographer Lothar Winkler on the set of In Harm's Way (1964)

=== As actor ===
Year	Title	Role	Notes	Refs.
1926	Brown of Harvard	Yale Football Player	Uncredited	
1926	Bardelys the Magnificent	Guard	Uncredited	
1926	The Great K & A Train Robbery	Extra	Uncredited	
1927	Annie Laurie	Extra	Uncredited	
1927	The Draw-Back	Opposing Football Player	Short film; uncredited	
1927	The Drop Kick	Football Player / Extra in Stands	Uncredited; a.k.a. Glitter (UK title)	
1927	Seeing Stars	Tall Boy	Short film; uncredited	
1928	Mother Machree	Extra	Uncredited (Note: Sources disagree whether Wayne actually appeared on film in this picture, as well. He was also a prop man for this film, although he was uncredited.)	
1928	Four Sons	Officer	Uncredited	
1928	Hangman's House	Horse Race Spectator / Condemned Man in Flashback	Uncredited (Note: Wayne unbilled but noticeable as a spectator in a horse racing scene)	
1928	A Home-Made Man	Man on Stool	Short film; uncredited	
1928	Noah's Ark	Flood extra	Uncredited	
1929	Speakeasy	Extra	Uncredited	
1929	The Black Watch	42nd Highlander	Uncredited (Note: Wayne was also the prop man for this film, although he was uncredited.)	
1929	Words and Music	Pete Donahue	Credited as Duke Morrison (Note: Wayne was also the property assistant for this film, although he was uncredited.)	
1929	Salute	Midshipman Bill	(Note: Wayne was also the costumer for this movie although he was not credited for it.)	
1929	The Forward Pass	Football Player	Uncredited	
1930	Men Without Women	Radioman on Surface	Uncredited	
1930	Born Reckless	Extra	Uncredited	
1930	Rough Romance	Lumberjack	Uncredited	
1930	Cheer Up and Smile	Roy	Uncredited	
1930	The Big Trail	Breck Coleman	Wayne's first starring role	
1931	Girls Demand Excitement	Peter Brooks		
1931	Three Girls Lost	Gordon Wales		
1931	Arizona	Lt. Bob Denton	a.k.a. Men Are Like That and The Virtuous Wife (UK title)	
1931	The Deceiver	Richard Thorpe as a corpse		
1931	The Range Feud	Clint Turner		
1931	Maker of Men	Dusty Rhodes		
1932	The Shadow of the Eagle	Craig McCoy		
1932	Texas Cyclone	Steve Pickett		
1932	Two-Fisted Law	Duke		
1932	Lady and Gent	Buzz Kinney		
1932	The Hurricane Express	Larry Baker		
1932	Ride Him, Cowboy	John Drury	a.k.a. The Hawk (UK title)	
1932	That's My Boy	Taylor - Harvard Player	Uncredited	
1932	The Big Stampede	John Steele		
1932	Haunted Gold	John Mason		
1933	The Telegraph Trail	John Trent		
1933	The Three Musketeers	Tom Wayne		
1933	Central Airport	Co-Pilot in Wreck	Uncredited	
1933	Somewhere in Sonora	John Bishop		
1933	His Private Secretary	Dick Wallace		
1933	The Life of Jimmy Dolan	Smith	a.k.a. The Kid's Last Fight (UK title)	
1933	Baby Face	Jimmy McCoy Jr.		
1933	The Man from Monterey	Captain John Holmes		
1933	Riders of Destiny	Singin' Sandy Saunders		
1933	College Coach	Student Greeting Phil	Uncredited; a.k.a. Football Coach (UK title)	
1933	Sagebrush Trail	John Brant a.k.a. Smith	a.k.a. An Innocent Man (UK title)	
1934	The Lucky Texan	Jerry Mason	a.k.a. Gold Strike River	
1934	West of the Divide	Ted Hayden posing as Gat Ganns		
1934	Blue Steel	John Carruthers	a.k.a. Stolen Goods (UK title).	
1934	The Man from Utah	John Weston		
1934	Randy Rides Alone	Randy Bowers		
1934	The Star Packer	John Travers		
1934	The Trail Beyond	Rod Drew		
1934	The Lawless Frontier	John Tobin		
1934	'Neath the Arizona Skies	Chris Morrell		
1935	Texas Terror	John Higgins		
1935	Rainbow Valley	John Martin		
1935	The Desert Trail	John Scott posing as John Jones		
1935	The Dawn Rider	John Mason	a.k.a. Cold Vengeance	
1935	Paradise Canyon	John Wyatt posing as John Rogers	a.k.a. Guns Along The Trail	
1935	Westward Ho	John Wyatt a.k.a. John Allen		
1935	The New Frontier	John Dawson		
1935	Lawless Range	John Middleton		
1936	The Oregon Trail	Capt. John Delmont	A lost film; 40 stills were discovered in 2013	
1936	The Lawless Nineties	John Tipton		
1936	King of the Pecos	John Clayborn		
1936	The Lonely Trail	Captain John Ashley		
1936	Winds of the Wasteland	John Blair	a.k.a. Stagecoach Run	
1936	Sea Spoilers	Bob Randall		
1936	Conflict	Pat Glendon		
1937	California Straight Ahead!	Biff Smith		
1937	I Cover the War	Bob Adams		
1937	Idol of the Crowds	Johnny Hanson		
1937	Adventure's End	Duke Slade		
1937	Born to the West	Dare Rudd	a.k.a. Hell Town (reissue title)	
1938	Pals of the Saddle	Stoney Brooke	The first of eight films in the "Three Mesquiteers" series	
1938	Overland Stage Raiders	Stoney Brooke		
1938	Santa Fe Stampede	Stoney Brooke		
1938	Red River Range	Stoney Brooke		
1939	Stagecoach	Ringo Kid		
1939	The Night Riders	Stoney Brooke		
1939	Three Texas Steers	Stoney Brooke	a.k.a. Danger Rides the Range (UK title)	
1939	Wyoming Outlaw	Stoney Brooke		
1939	New Frontier	Stoney Brooke	a.k.a. Frontier Horizon	
1939	Allegheny Uprising	Jim Smith	a.k.a. The First Rebel (UK title)	
1940	Dark Command	Bob Seton		
1940	Three Faces West	John Phillips		
1940	The Long Voyage Home	Olsen		
1940	Seven Sinners	Dan	a.k.a. Cafe of the Seven Sinners (UK re-issue title)	
1941	A Man Betrayed	Lynn Hollister	a.k.a. Citadel of Crime (UK title) and Wheel of Fortune (TV title)	
1941	Lady from Louisiana	John Reynolds		
1941	The Shepherd of the Hills	Young Matt Matthews		
1942	Lady for a Night	Jack Morgan		
1942	Reap the Wild Wind	Capt. Jack Stuart		
1942	The Spoilers	Roy Glennister		
1942	In Old California	Tom Craig		
1942	Flying Tigers	Capt. Jim Gordon		
1942	Reunion in France	Pat Talbot	a.k.a. Mademoiselle France (UK title)	
1942	Pittsburgh	Pittsburgh Markham		
1943	A Lady Takes a Chance	Duke Hudkins		
1943	In Old Oklahoma	Daniel F. Somers	a.k.a. War of the Wildcats (re-issue title)	
1944	The Fighting Seabees	Lt. Cmdr. Wedge Donovan		
1944	Tall in the Saddle	Rocklin		
1944	Flame of Barbary Coast	Duke Fergus		
1945	Back to Bataan	Col. Joseph Madden		
1945	They Were Expendable	Lt. (J.G.) "Rusty" Ryan		
1945	Dakota	John Devlin		
1946	Without Reservations	Captain "Rusty" Thomas		
1947	Angel and the Badman	Quirt Evans	Also producer	
1947	Tycoon	Johnny		
1948	Red River	Thomas Dunson		
1948	Fort Apache	Capt. Kirby York		
1948	3 Godfathers	Robert Marmaduke Sangster Hightower		
1948	Wake of the Red Witch	Capt. Ralls		
1949	The Fighting Kentuckian	John Breen		
1949	She Wore a Yellow Ribbon	Capt. Nathan Cutting Brittles		
1949	Sands of Iwo Jima	Sgt. John M. Stryker		
1950	Rio Grande	Lt. Col. Kirby Yorke		
1951	Operation Pacific	Lt Cmdr. Duke E. Gifford		
1951	Flying Leathernecks	Maj. Daniel Xavier Kirby		
1952	The Quiet Man	Sean Thornton	Also second unit director (uncredited)	
1952	Big Jim McLain	Jim McLain	Also producer	
1953	Trouble Along the Way	Steve Williams		
1953	Island in the Sky	Capt. Dooley	Also producer	
1953	Hondo	Hondo Lane	Also producer	
1954	The High and the Mighty	Officer Dan Roman		
1955	The Sea Chase	Capt. Karl Ehrlich		
1955	Screen Directors Playhouse	Mike Cronin	TV series (Episode: "Rookie of the Year")	
1955	Blood Alley	Capt. Tom Wilder	Also producer	
1956	The Conqueror	Temüjin		
1956	The Searchers	Ethan Edwards		
1957	The Wings of Eagles	Frank W. "Spig" Wead		
1957	Jet Pilot	Col. Jim Shannon		
1957	Legend of the Lost	Joe January		
1958	The Barbarian and the Geisha	Townsend Harris		
1959	Rio Bravo	Sheriff John T. Chance		
1959	The Horse Soldiers	Col. John Marlowe		
1960	The Alamo	Col. Davy Crockett	Also director and producer	
1960	North to Alaska	Sam McCord		
1960	Wagon Train	Gen. William Tecumseh Sherman	TV series (Episode: "The Colter Craven Story")	
1961	The Comancheros	Capt. Jake Cutter		
1962	Alcoa Premiere	Marine Sergeant	TV series (Episode: "Flashing Spikes"); credited as Marion Morrison	
1962	The Man Who Shot Liberty Valance	Tom Doniphon		
1962	Hatari!	Sean Mercer		
1962	The Longest Day	Lt. Col. Benjamin H. Vandervoort		
1962	How the West Was Won	Gen. William Tecumseh Sherman		
1963	Donovan's Reef	Michael Patrick "Guns" Donovan		
1963	McLintock!	George Washington "G.W." McLintock		
1964	Circus World	Matt Masters	a.k.a. The Magnificent Showman (UK title)	
1965	The Greatest Story Ever Told	Centurion at Crucifixion		
1965	In Harm's Way	Rock		
1965	The Sons of Katie Elder	John Elder		
1966	Cast a Giant Shadow	Gen. Mike Randolph	Also co-executive producer (uncredited)	
1966	El Dorado	Cole Thornton		
1967	The War Wagon	Taw Jackson		
1968	The Green Berets	Col. Mike Kirby		
1968	Hellfighters	Chance Buckman		
1969	True Grit	Rooster Cogburn		
1969	The Undefeated	Col. John Henry Thomas		
1970	No Substitute for Victory	Narrator		
1970	Chisum	John Chisum		
1970	Rio Lobo	Col. Cord McNally		
1970	Swing Out, Sweet Land	Himself		
1970	Harry Jackson: A Man and His Art	Narrator	Short documentary	
1971	Big Jake	Jacob McCandles	Also uncredited executive producer	
1972	The Cowboys	Wil Andersen		
1972	Cancel My Reservation	Himself		
1973	The Train Robbers	Lane	Also executive producer (uncredited)	
1973	Cahill U.S. Marshal	J. D. Cahill	a.k.a. Cahill (UK title); also executive producer (uncredited)	
1974	McQ	Lieutenant Lon "McQ" McHugh		
1975	Brannigan	Lt. James Brannigan		
1975	Rooster Cogburn	Rooster Cogburn		
1976	The Shootist	J.B. Books		
1977	Star Wars	Garindan	Stock audio only; uncredited	

=== As himself ===
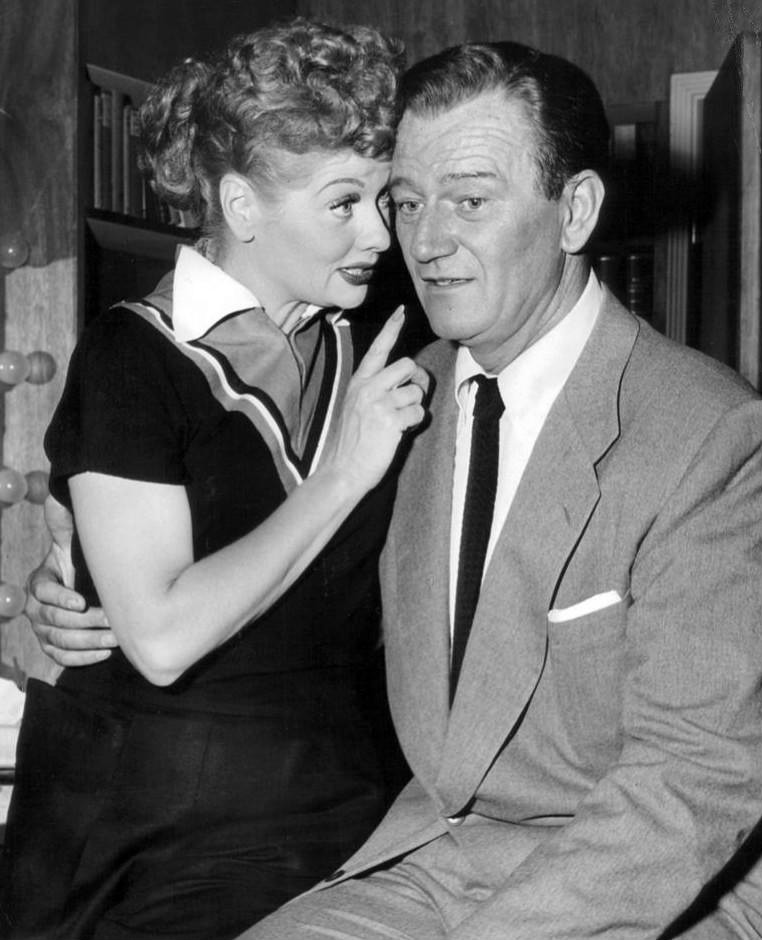
Wayne with Lucille Ball in I Love Lucy, 1955

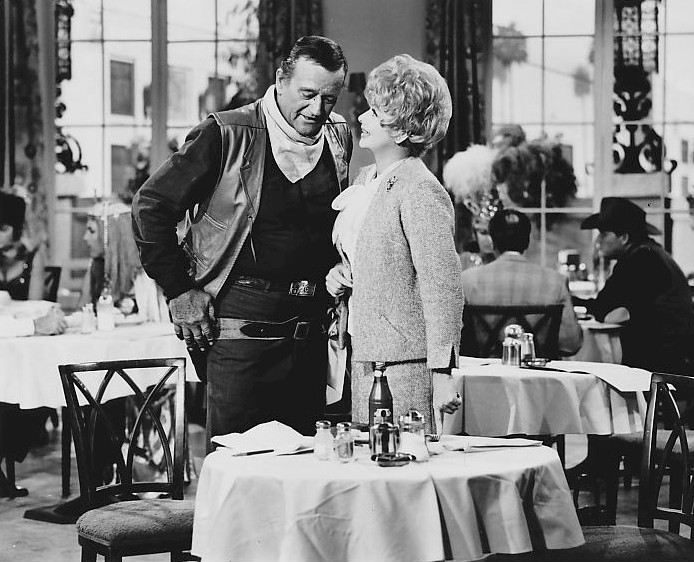
Wayne with Ball in The Lucy Show, 1966

Year	Title	Notes	Refs.
1932	The Voice of Hollywood: No. 13	Short film	
1932	Running Hollywood	Two-reel short	
1932	The Hollywood Handicap	Two-reel short	
1940	Screen Snapshots	Short film	
1941	Meet the Stars: Past and Present	Promotional short	
1944	Memo for Joe	Short film	
1949	Screen Snapshots: Hollywood Rodeo	Short documentary	
1950	Screen Snapshots: Hollywood's Famous Feet	Short documentary; uncredited	
1951	Screen Snapshots: Reno's Silver Spur Awards	Short documentary	
1951	The Screen Director	Promotional short	
1951	Screen Snapshots: Hollywood Awards	Short documentary	
1953	The Colgate Comedy Hour	TV series (1 episode)	
1954	This is Your Life	TV series (Episode: "William Wellman")	
1955	Screen Snapshots: The Great Al Jolson	Short documentary	
1955	Gunsmoke	TV series (Episode: "Matt Gets It")	
1955	Sheilah Graham in Hollywood	TV series (Episode: "John Wayne")	
1955	The Milton Berle Show	TV series (1 episode)	
1955	I Love Lucy	TV series (Episode: "Lucy and John Wayne")	
1955	Producers' Showcase	TV series (Episode: "Dateline II")	
1955	Casablanca	TV series (Episode: "Who Holds Tomorrow")	
1956	Climax!	TV series (Episode: "The Lovella Parsons Story")	
1956	Screen Directors Playhouse	TV series (Episode: "Markheim")	
1958	I Married a Woman	Uncredited cameo	
1958	The 30th Annual Academy Awards	Presenter	
1958	Screen Snapshots: Salute to Hollywood	Short documentary	
1958	Wide Wide World	TV series documentary	
1959	World's Heavyweight Championship Fight: Floyd Patterson Heavyweight Champion of the World; Vs. Ingemar Johansson Heavyweight Champion of Europe	Short documentary; uncredited	
1959	The 31st Annual Academy Awards	Presenter	
1960	The Spirit of The Alamo	Documentary	
1960	The 32nd Annual Academy Awards	Presenter	
1960	The Jack Paar Tonight Show	TV series (1 episode)	
1960	The Jack Benny Program	TV series (Episode: "The John Wayne Show")	
1960	What's My Line?	TV series (Episode: "11-13-1960")	
1960, 1964	Cinépanorama	TV series (2 episodes)	
1960	The Ed Sullivan Show	TV series (1 episode)	
1961	The Challenge of Ideas	Propaganda short	
1962	Here's Hollywood	TV series (1 episode)	
1963	The Dick Powell Show	TV series (Episode: "The Third Side of a Coin")	
1965	The Making of In Harm's Way	Short documentary	
1966	The Merv Griffin Show	TV series (Episode: "3-16-1966")	
1966	The Lucy Show	TV series (Episode: "Lucy meets John Wayne")	
1966–1969	The Red Skelton Show	TV series (2 episodes)	
1967	The Artist and the American West	Short documentary	
1967	A Nation Builds Under Fire	Short documentary	
1967	The Beverly Hillbillies	TV series (Episode: "The Indians are Coming")	
1967	The Dean Martin Show	TV series (5 episodes)	
1968	The Movie Makers	Short documentary	
1968–1973	Rowan & Martin's Laugh-In	TV series (10 episodes)	
1968, 1969	The Joey Bishop Show	TV series (2 episodes)	
1969–1971	The Glenn Campbell Good Time Hour	TV series (2 episodes)	
1970	No Substitute for Victory	Short	
1970	John Wayne and Chisum	Short documentary	
1970	Plimpton! Shoot out at Rio Lobo	TV documentary	
1970	The Movie Game	TV series (1 episode)	
1970	Swing Out, Sweet Land	TV movie	
1970	Raquel!	TV special	
1970	The 27th Annual Golden Globe Awards	TV special	
1970	The 42nd Annual Academy Awards	Presenter	
1970	Harry Jacks: A Man and His Art	Short documentary	
1971	Sehnsucht nach dem Wilden Westen	TV movie	
1971	The Bob Hope Specials	TV series (1 episode)	
1971	Directed by John Ford	Documentary	
1971	Everything You Always Wanted to Know; About Jack Benny But Were Afraid to Ask	TV special	
1971–1976	The Tonight Show Starring Johnny Carson	TV series (6 episodes)	
1971	The American West of John Ford	Documentary	
1971, 1975	V.I.P. Schaukel	TV series (2 episodes)	
1972	The Breaking of Boys and the Making of Men	Short documentary	
1972	Cancel My Reservation		
1972	The 44th Annual Academy Awards	Presenter	
1972	The David Frost Show	Short documentary	
1973	The Wayne Train	Short documentary	
1973	RCA's Opening Night	TV movie	
1973	Cavalcade of Champions	Short documentary	
1974	McQ: John Wayne in Action		
1974	John Wayne and Glenn Campbell and the Musical West	TV special	
1974	The Dean Martin Celebrity Roast: Bob Hope	TV series (1 episode)	
1974	Maude	TV series (Episode: "Maude Meets the Duke")	
1974	Parkinson	TV series (1 episode)	
1974	AFI Life Achievement Award: A Tribute to James Cagney		
1975	Texaco Presents: A Quarter Century of Bob Hope on Television	TV special	
1975	Bob Hope on Campus	TV special	
1975	The 17th Annual TV Week Logie Awards	Short documentary	
1975	Backstage in Hollywood	TV series (1 episode)	
1975	The 47th Annual Academy Awards	Presenter	
1976	Backlot USA	TV movie	
1976	The Mike Douglas Show	TV series (1 episode)	
1976	The 2nd Annual People's Choice Awards	TV special	
1976	An All Star Tribute to John Wayne	TV movie	
1976	CBS Salutes Lucy: The First 25 Years	Documentary	
1976	Chesty: A Tribute to a Legend	Documentary	
1976	America Salutes Richard Rodgers: The Sound of His Music	TV movie	
1977	The 3rd Annual People's Choice Awards	TV special	
1977	Home for the Seabees	Documentary	
1977	An All-Star Tribute to Elizabeth Taylor	TV special	
1977	Super Night at the Super Bowl	TV special	
1977	Jimmy Carter's Inaugural Address Gala	TV special	
1978	AFI Life Achievement Award: A Tribute to Henry Fonda	TV special	
1978	ABC's Silver Anniversary Celebration	TV special	
1978	Happy Birthday, Bob	TV special	
1978	General Electric's All Star Anniversary	TV documentary	
1978	Early American Christmas	TV special	
1979	The 51st Annual Academy Awards	Presenter	
1979	The Barbara Walters Summer Special	TV special	
1982	I Love Liberty	TV special (posthumous appearance)	

== As producer only ==
Year	Title	Notes	Refs.
1950	The Dangerous Stranger	Short; uncredited	
1951	The Bullfighter and the Lady		
1951	Santa and the Fairy Snow Queen	Short; uncredited	
1953	Plunder of the Sun	Uncredited	
1954	Ring of Fear	Uncredited	
1956	Track of the Cat	Uncredited	
1956	Goodbye, My Lady	Uncredited	
1956	Seven Men From Now	Uncredited	
1956	Gun the Man Down	Uncredited	
1956	Man in the Vault	Uncredited	
1958	China Doll	Uncredited	
1959	Escort West	Uncredited; also uncredited producer	
1960	The Alamo	Produced & Directed	
1967	Hondo and the Apaches	TV film; uncredited	
1967	Hondo	Executive producer; TV series (17 episodes); uncredited	

== Box office popularity ==
Results from Quigley's Motion Picture Herald annual poll of film exhibitors would determine the year's "Top Ten Stars". John Wayne appeared on the list every time between 1949 and 1973 with one exception – 1958 – indicating that he was one of cinema's most durable stars.

Place	1949	1950	1951	1952	1953
1	Bob Hope	John Wayne	John Wayne	Martin & Lewis	Gary Cooper
2	Bing Crosby	Bob Hope	Martin & Lewis	Gary Cooper	Martin & Lewis
3	Abbott & Costello	Bing Crosby	Betty Grable	John Wayne	John Wayne
4	John Wayne	Betty Grable	Abbott & Costello	Bing Crosby	Alan Ladd
5	Gary Cooper	James Stewart	Bing Crosby	Bob Hope	Gary Cooper
6	Cary Grant	Abbott & Costello	Bob Hope	James Stewart	Marlon Brando
7	Betty Grable	Clifton Webb	Randolph Scott	Doris Day	Martin & Lewis
8	Esther Williams	Esther Williams	Gary Cooper	Gregory Peck	Humphrey Bogart
9	Humphrey Bogart	Spencer Tracy	Doris Day	Susan Hayward	June Allyson
10	Clark Gable	Randolph Scott	Spencer Tracy	Randolph Scott	Clark Gable

Place	1954	1955	1956	1957	1958
1	John Wayne	James Stewart	William Holden	Rock Hudson	Glenn Ford
2	Martin & Lewis	Grace Kelly	John Wayne	John Wayne	Elizabeth Taylor
3	Gary Cooper	John Wayne	James Stewart	Pat Boone	Jerry Lewis
4	James Stewart	William Holden	Burt Lancaster	Elvis Presley	Marlon Brando
5	Glenn Ford	Bing Crosby	Marilyn Monroe	Frank Sinatra	Rock Hudson
6	Martin & Lewis	Marilyn Monroe	Alan Ladd	Gary Cooper	William Holden
7	Gary Cooper	James Stewart	William Holden	William Holden	Brigitte Bardot
8	Marilyn Monroe	Bob Hope	Bing Crosby	James Stewart	Yul Brynner
9	Kim Novak	Susan Hayward	Jane Wyman	Jerry Lewis	James Stewart
10	Frank Sinatra	Randolph Scott	Marlon Brando	Yul Brynner	Frank Sinatra

Place	1959	1960	1961	1962	1963
1	Rock Hudson	Doris Day	Elizabeth Taylor	Doris Day	Doris Day
2	Cary Grant	Rock Hudson	Rock Hudson	Rock Hudson	John Wayne
3	James Stewart	Cary Grant	Doris Day	Cary Grant	Rock Hudson
4	Doris Day	Elizabeth Taylor	John Wayne	John Wayne	Jack Lemmon
5	Debbie Reynolds	Debbie Reynolds	Cary Grant	Elvis Presley	Cary Grant
6	Glenn Ford	Tony Curtis	Sandra Dee	Elizabeth Taylor	Elizabeth Taylor
7	Frank Sinatra	Sandra Dee	Jerry Lewis	Jerry Lewis	Elvis Presley
8	John Wayne	Frank Sinatra	William Holden	Frank Sinatra	Sandra Dee
9	Jerry Lewis	Jack Lemmon	Tony Curtis	Sandra Dee	Paul Newman
10	Susan Hayward	John Wayne	Elvis Presley	Burt Lancaster	Jerry Lewis

Place	1964	1965	1966	1967	1968
1	Doris Day	Sean Connery	Julie Andrews	Julie Andrews	Sidney Poitier
2	Jack Lemmon	John Wayne	Sean Connery	Lee Marvin	Paul Newman
3	Rock Hudson	Doris Day	Elizabeth Taylor	Paul Newman	Julie Andrews
4	John Wayne	Julie Andrews	Jack Lemmon	Dean Martin	John Wayne
5	Cary Grant	Jack Lemmon	Richard Burton	Sean Connery	Clint Eastwood
6	Elvis Presley	Elvis Presley	Cary Grant	Elizabeth Taylor	Dean Martin
7	Shirley MacLaine	Cary Grant	John Wayne	Sidney Poitier	Dustin Hoffman
8	Ann-Margret	James Stewart	Doris Day	John Wayne	Jack Lemmon
9	Paul Newman	Elizabeth Taylor	Paul Newman	Richard Burton	Lee Marvin
10	Richard Burton	Richard Burton	Elvis Presley	Steve McQueen	Elizabeth Taylor

Place	1969	1970	1971	1972	1973
1	Paul Newman	Paul Newman	John Wayne	Clint Eastwood	Clint Eastwood
2	John Wayne	Clint Eastwood	Clint Eastwood	George C. Scott	Ryan O'Neal
3	Steve McQueen	Steve McQueen	Paul Newman	Gene Hackman	Steve McQueen
4	Dustin Hoffman	John Wayne	Steve McQueen	John Wayne	Burt Reynolds
5	Clint Eastwood	Elliott Gould	George C. Scott	Barbra Streisand	Robert Redford
6	Sidney Poitier	Dustin Hoffman	Dustin Hoffman	Marlon Brando	Barbra Streisand
7	Lee Marvin	Lee Marvin	Walter Matthau	Paul Newman	Paul Newman
8	Jack Lemmon	Jack Lemmon	Ali MacGraw	Steve McQueen	Charles Bronson
9	Katharine Hepburn	Barbra Streisand	Sean Connery	Dustin Hoffman	John Wayne
10	Barbra Streisand	Walter Matthau	Lee Marvin	Goldie Hawn	Marlon Brando

== Sources ==
- Boswell, John; David, Jay (1979). The John Wayne Album. New York: Ballantine Books. ISBN 978-0345280886.
- Eyles, Allan (1979). John Wayne. New York: A.S. Barnes & Co. ISBN 978-0498025907.
- Fagen, Herb (2003). The Encyclopedia of Westerns. New York: Facts On File. ISBN 978-0816044566.
- Landesman, Fred (2004). The John Wayne Filmography. Jefferson, NC: McFarland. ISBN 978-0786432523.
