= Salute (1929 film) =

1929 film directed by John Ford

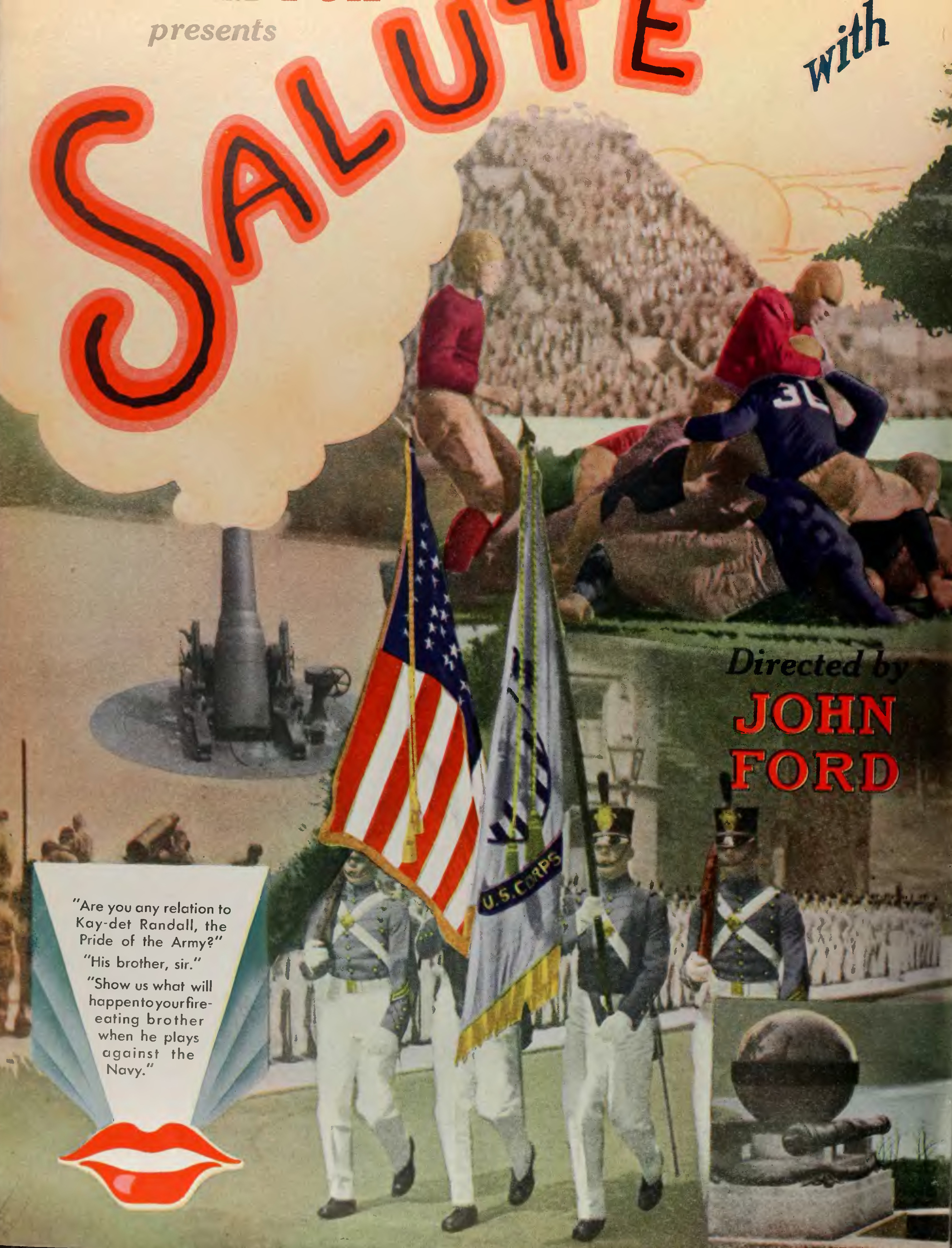
- Directed by: David Butler; John Ford
- Written by: James Kevin McGuinness
- Produced by: John Ford
- Starring: George O'Brien; Helen Chandler; William Janney; Joyce Compton; Frank Albertson; Stepin Fetchit
- Cinematography: Joseph H. August
- Edited by: Alex Troffey
- Distributed by: Fox Film Corporation
- Release date: September 1, 1929
- Running time: 84 minutes
- Country: United States
- Language: English

Salute is a 1929 American sound (All-Talking) drama film directed by John Ford and starring George O'Brien, Helen Chandler, William Janney, Stepin Fetchit, Frank Albertson, and Ward Bond. It is about the football rivalry of the Army–Navy Game, and two brothers, played by O'Brien and Janney, one of West Point, the other of Annapolis. John Wayne had an uncredited role in the film, as one of three midshipmen who perform a mild hazing.

== Plot ==
Salute (1929)

== Cast ==
- George O'Brien as Cadet John Randall
- Helen Chandler as Nancy Wayne
- William Janney as Midshipman Paul Randall
- Stepin Fetchit as "Smoke Screen"
- Frank Albertson as Midshipman Albert Edward Price
- Ward Bond as Midshipman Harold
- John Wayne as (uncredited) Midshipman Bill
- Joyce Compton as Marian Wilson

== Production ==
Five weeks were spent filming on location at the Naval Academy in Annapolis, Maryland.

== See also ==
- John Wayne filmography
- List of American football films
- List of early sound feature films (1926–1929)
