= Ward Bond =

American actor (1903–1960)

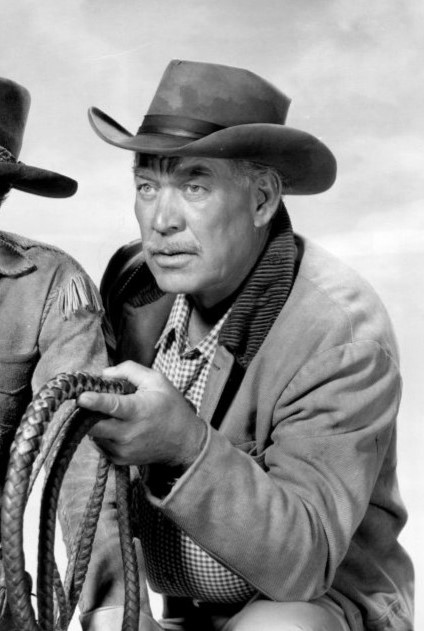
- Publicity image of Bond for Wagon Train, c. 1957
- Born: Wardell Edwin Bond; April 9, 1903; Benkelman, Nebraska, U.S.
- Died: November 5, 1960 (aged 57); Dallas, Texas, U.S.
- Education: University of Southern California
- Occupation: Actor
- Years active: 1929–1960
- Spouses: Doris Sellers Childs (m. 1936; div. 1944) Mary Louise May (m. 1954)

Wardell Edwin Bond (April 9, 1903 – November 5, 1960) was an American character actor who appeared in more than 200 films and starred in the NBC television series Wagon Train from 1957 to 1960. Among his best-remembered film roles are Bert the cop in Frank Capra's It's a Wonderful Life (1946) and Captain Clayton in John Ford's The Searchers (1956).

== Early life ==
Bond was born in Benkelman in Dundy County, Nebraska. The Bond family, John W., Mabel L., and sister Bernice, lived in Benkelman until 1919, when they moved to Denver, Colorado, where Bond graduated from East High School.

Bond attended the Colorado School of Mines and then attended the University of Southern California and played football on the same team with future USC coach Jess Hill. At 6'2" and 195 pounds, Bond was a starting lineman on USC's first national-championship team in 1928. He graduated from USC in 1931 with a bachelor of science degree in engineering.

== Career ==
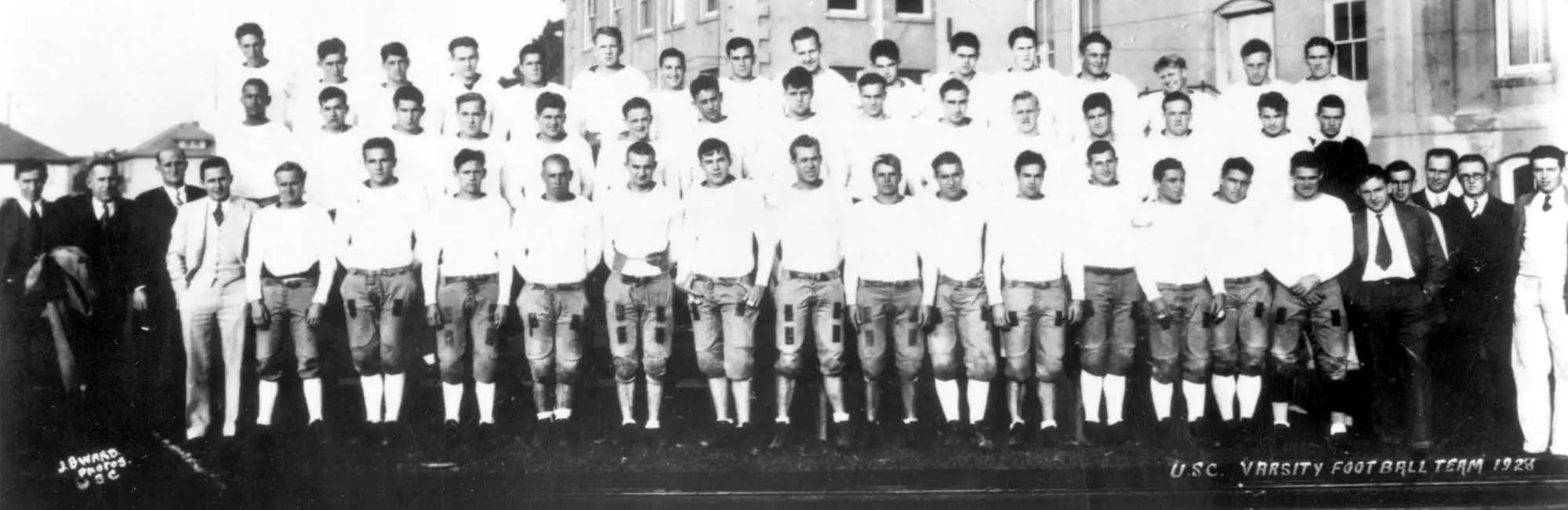
USC championship team, 1928. Bond is seventh player from left, or eighth player from right, in the front row.

Bond and John Wayne, who had played tackle for USC in 1926 before an injury ended his career, became lifelong friends and colleagues. Bond, Wayne, and the entire USC team were hired to appear in Salute (1929), a football film starring George O'Brien and directed by John Ford. During filming, Bond and Wayne befriended Ford, who later directed them in several films.

Having made his screen debut in Salute, Bond was thereafter was a busy character actor, playing over 200 supporting roles. He appeared in 31 films released in 1935 and 23 in 1939.

Rarely playing the lead in theatrical films, he starred in the television series Wagon Train from 1957 until his death in 1960. Wagon Train was inspired by the 1950 film Wagon Master, in which Bond also appeared. Wagon Master was influenced by the earlier The Big Trail. For Wagon Train, Bond was assigned the lead role of the crusty but compassionate Major Seth Adams, the trail master.

He was frequently typecast in extremes, as either a friendly lawman or a brutal henchman. He had a longtime working relationship with directors John Ford and Frank Capra, performing in such films as The Searchers, Drums Along the Mohawk, The Quiet Man, They Were Expendable, and Fort Apache for Ford, with whom he made 25 films, and It Happened One Night, It's a Wonderful Life, and Riding High for Capra.

Among his other well-known films were Bringing Up Baby (1938), Gone with the Wind (1939), The Maltese Falcon (1941), Sergeant York (1941), Gentleman Jim (1942), Joan of Arc (1948), Rio Bravo (1959), and Raoul Walsh's 1930 widescreen wagon train epic The Big Trail, which also featured John Wayne in his first leading role.

During the 1940s, Bond was a member of the conservative group called the Motion Picture Alliance for the Preservation of American Ideals, whose major platform was opposition to communists in the film industry.

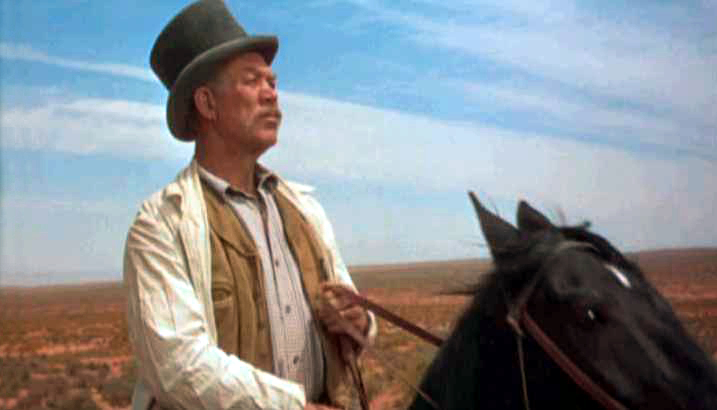
As Reverend Captain Clayton in The Searchers (1956)

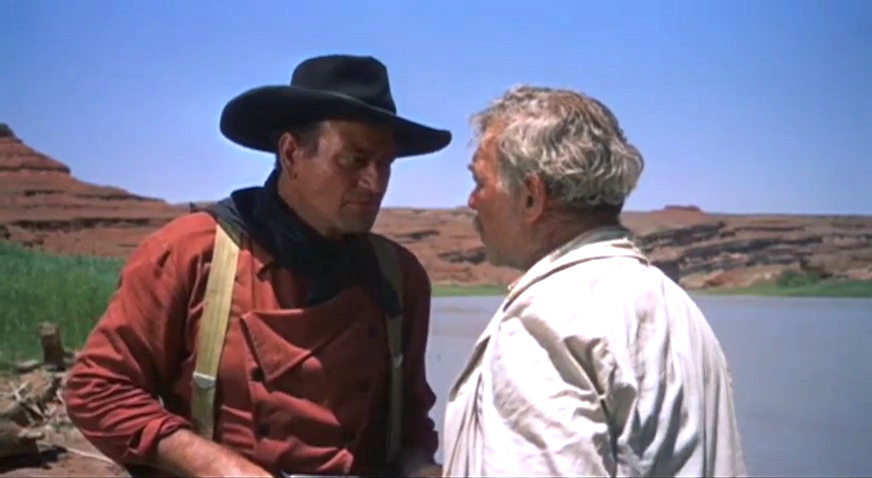
With John Wayne in The Searchers (1956)

On the American Film Institute's "100 Years... 100 Movies" list—both the original and the 10th-anniversary edition, Bond appears in the casts more often than any other actor, albeit always in a supporting role: It Happened One Night (1934), Bringing Up Baby (1938), Gone with the Wind (1939), The Grapes of Wrath (1940), The Maltese Falcon (1941), It's a Wonderful Life (1946), and The Searchers (1956).

Bond appeared in 13 films that were nominated for the Academy Award for Best Picture: Arrowsmith (1931/32), Lady for a Day (1933), It Happened One Night (1934) Dead End (1937), You Can't Take It with You (1938), Gone with the Wind (1939), The Grapes of Wrath (1940), The Long Voyage Home (1940), The Maltese Falcon (1941), Sergeant York (1941), It's a Wonderful Life (1946), The Quiet Man (1952), and Mister Roberts (1955).

Bond appeared in 24 films with John Wayne:

- Words and Music – bit part (uncredited) (1929)
- Salute – Midshipman Harold (1929)
- The Lone Star Ranger – Townsperson at the Dance (uncredited) (1930)
- Born Reckless – Sergeant (1930)
- The Big Trail – Sid Bascomb (1930)
- Maker of Men – Pat (uncredited) (1931)
- Three Girls Lost – Airline Steward (uncredited) (1931)
- College Coach – Assistant Coach (uncredited) (1933)
- Conflict – Gus "Knockout" Carrigan (1936)
- The Long Voyage Home – Yank (1940)
- The Shepherd of the Hills – Wash Gibbs (1941)
- A Man Betrayed – Floyd (1941)
- Tall in the Saddle – Judge Robert Garvey (1944)
- Dakota – Jim Bender (1945)
- They Were Expendable – BMC "Boats" Mulcahey (1945)
- 3 Godfathers – Perley "Buck" Sweet (1948)
- Fort Apache – Sergeant Major Michael O'Rourke (1948)
- Operation Pacific – Commander John T. "Pop" Perry (1951)
- The Quiet Man – Father Peter Lonergan (1952)
- Hondo – Buffalo Baker (1953)
- Rookie of the Year – Buck Goodhue, Alias Buck Garrison (TV drama 1955)
- The Searchers – Reverend Captain Samuel Johnson Clayton (1956)
- The Wings of Eagles – John Dodge (1957)
- Rio Bravo – Pat Wheeler (1959)

== Personal life ==
Bond married Doris Sellers Childs in 1936, but they divorced in 1944. In 1954, he married Mary Louise Meyers, and they remained together until his death in November 1960.

Bond was an early and dedicated anti–communist.

== Death ==
On November 5, 1960, Bond suffered a massive heart attack while at a hotel in Dallas with his wife. He was pronounced dead at a Dallas hospital at the age of 57. His close friend John Wayne delivered the eulogy at his funeral. Bond's will bequeathed to Wayne the shotgun with which Wayne had once accidentally shot Bond on a hunting trip.

On the same day Bond died, country singer Johnny Horton was fatally injured in an automobile accident in Milano, Texas. This led to a rumor that Horton was on his way to Dallas to meet Bond, who was to offer Horton a role on Wagon Train; the rumor was untrue. Bond's actual reason for visiting Dallas was to attend a football game at the Cotton Bowl.

== Legacy ==
For his contribution to the television industry, Bond has a star on the Hollywood Walk of Fame at 6933 Hollywood Boulevard. It was dedicated on February 8, 1960. In 2001, he was inducted into the Western Performers Hall of Fame at the National Cowboy & Western Heritage Museum in Oklahoma City.

== Filmography ==
=== Film ===
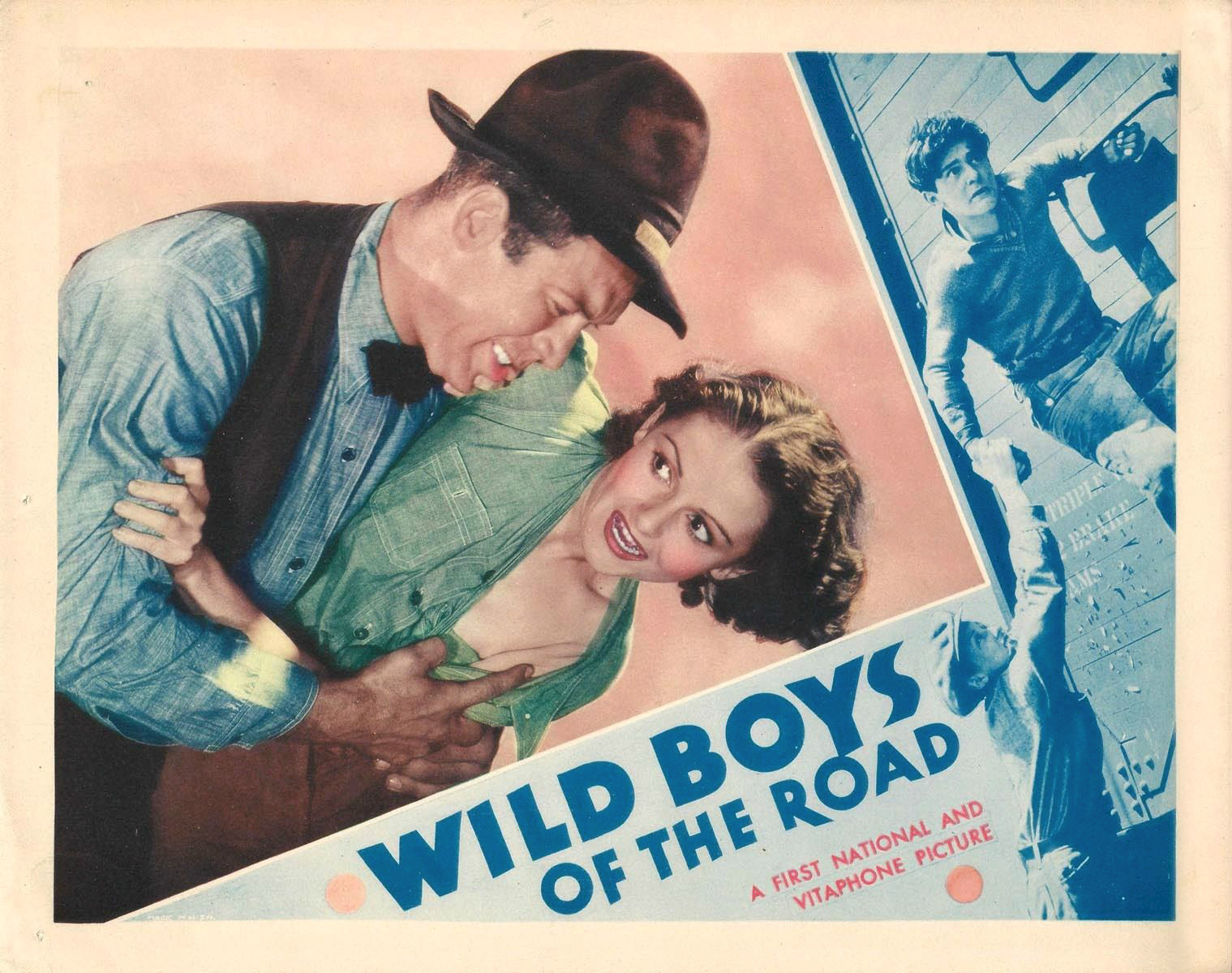
Lobby card for Wild Boys of the Road (1933)

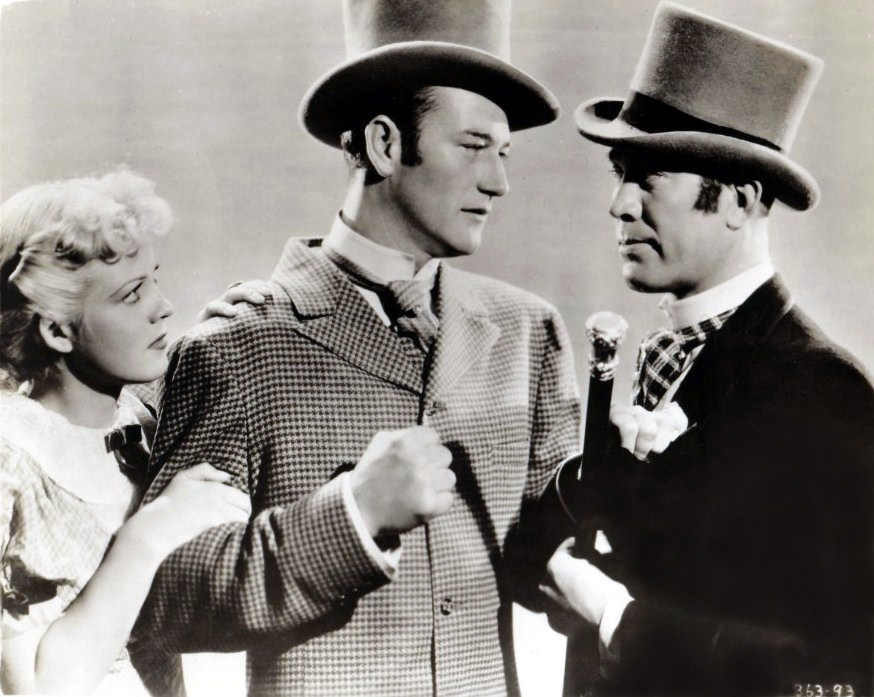
Jean Rogers, John Wayne, and Bond in Conflict (1936)

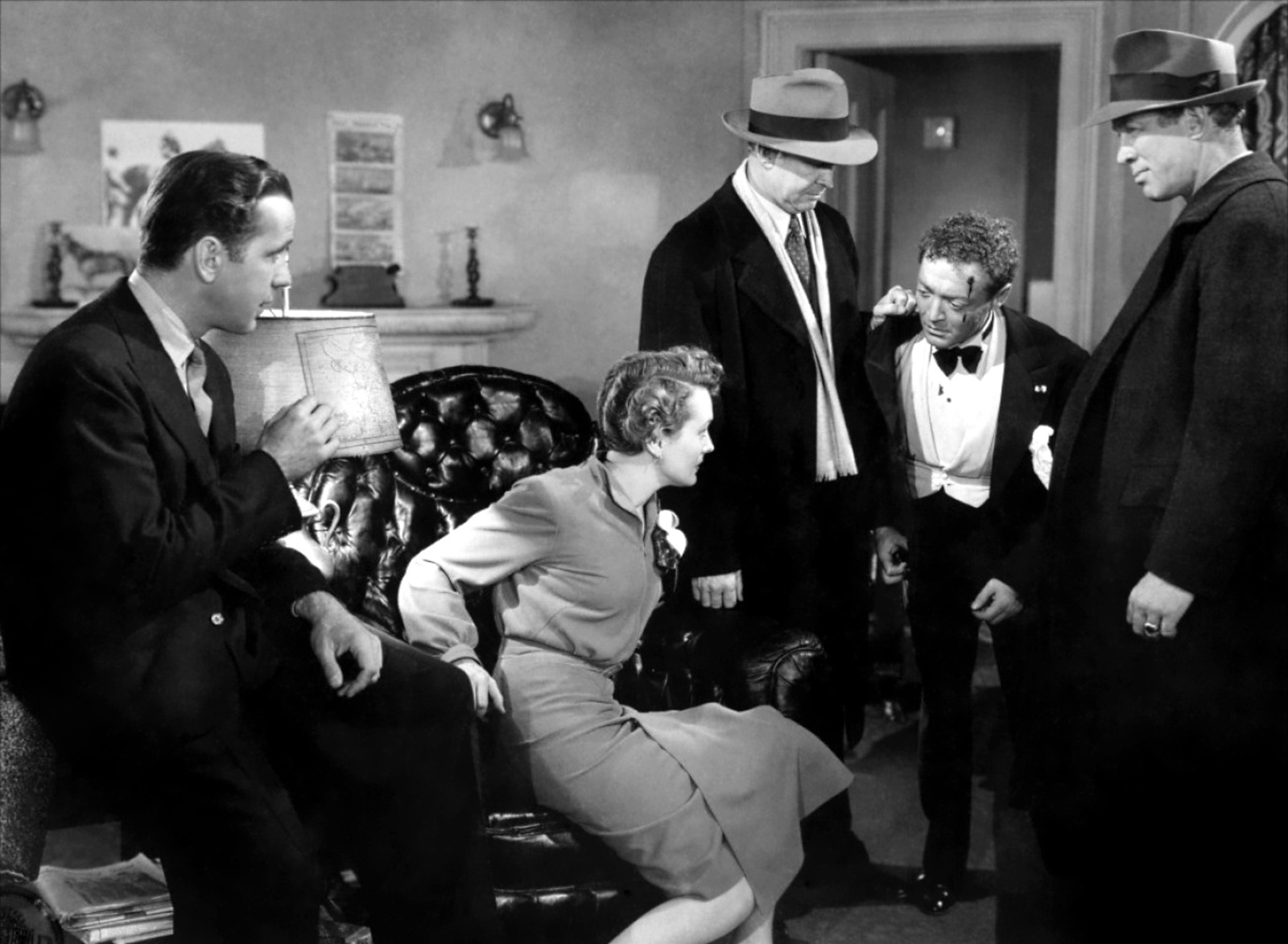
Bond (r.) with Humphrey Bogart, Mary Astor, Barton MacLane and Peter Lorre in The Maltese Falcon (1941)

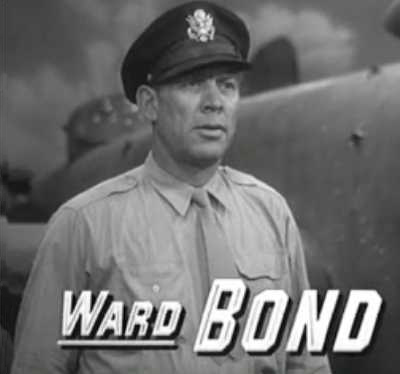
Bond in A Guy Named Joe (1943)

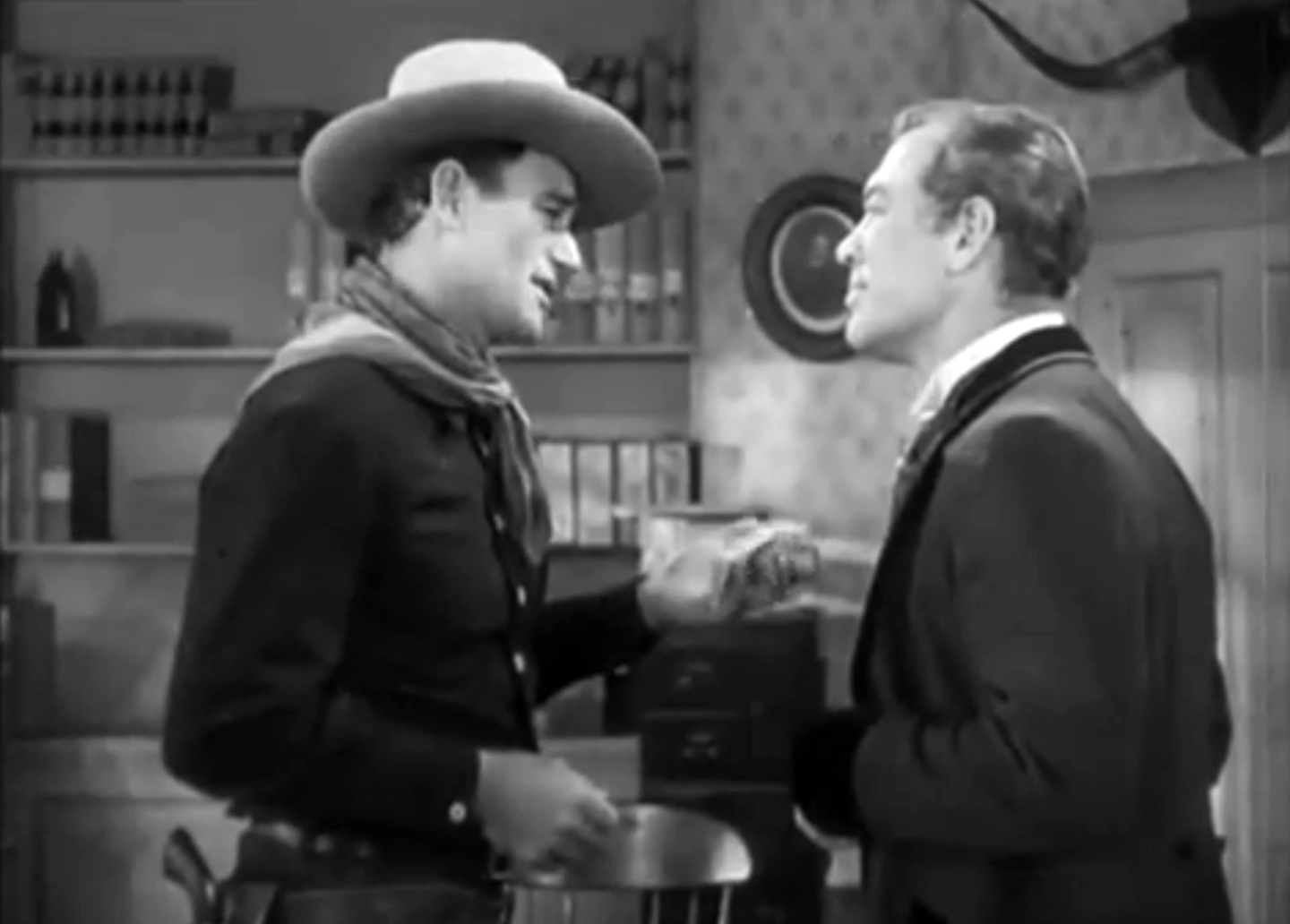
John Wayne and Bond in Tall in the Saddle (1944)

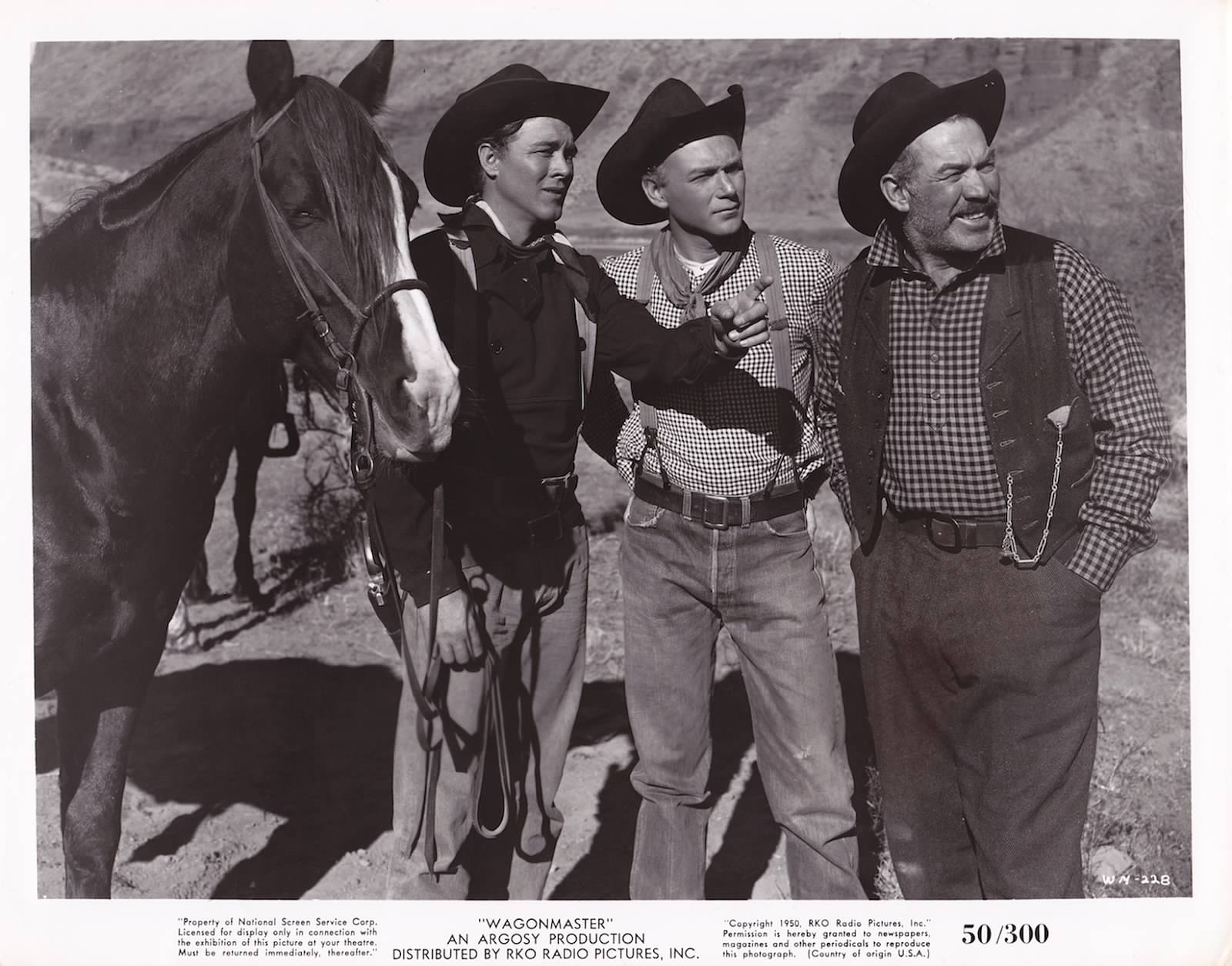
Ben Johnson, Harry Carey Jr. and Bond in John Ford's Wagon Master (1950)

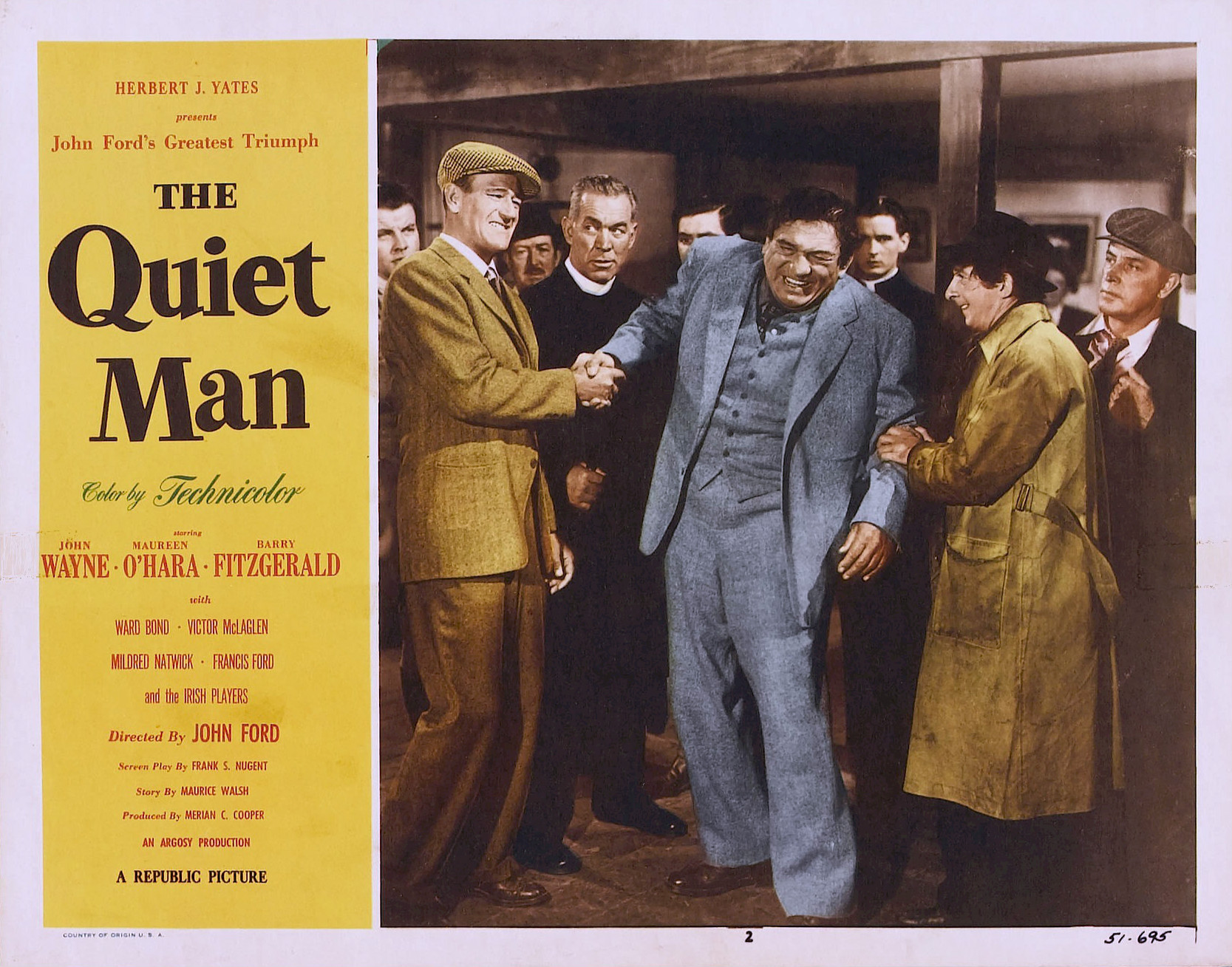
Lobby card for The Quiet Man (1952)

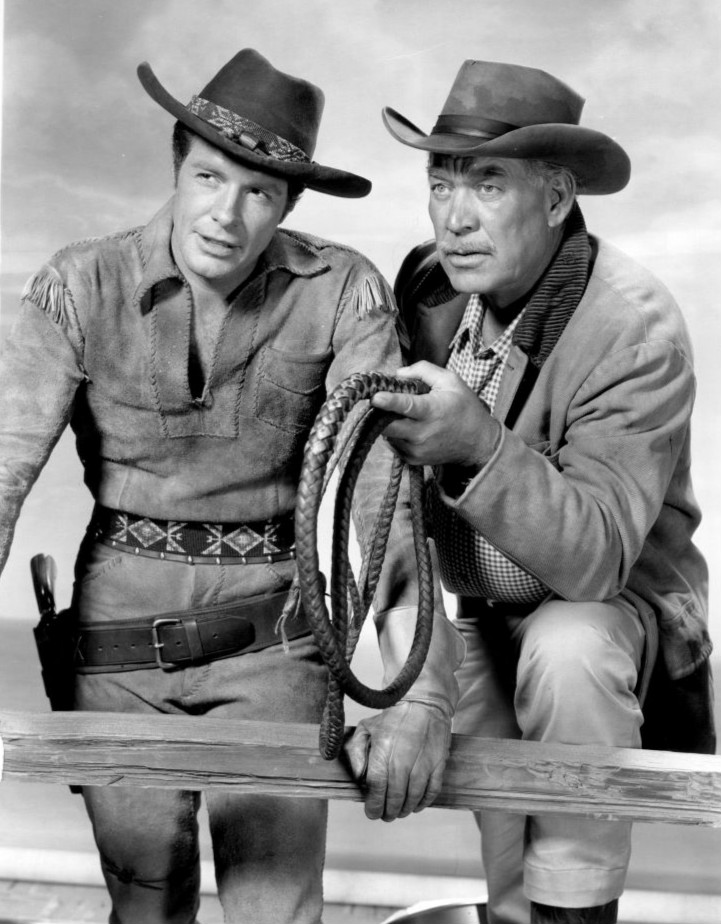
Publicity image of Robert Horton and Bond for Wagon Train, c. 1957

- Noah's Ark (1928) as Flood Extra (uncredited, film debut)
- Words and Music (1929) Bit Part (uncredited)
- Salute (1929) as Midshipman Harold
- So This Is College (1929) as USC Player-#30 (uncredited)
- The Lone Star Ranger (1930) as Townsperson at the Dance (uncredited)
- Born Reckless (1930) as Sergeant
- Cheer Up and Smile (1930) as Boy at Sweetheart Dance (uncredited)
- The Big Trail (1930) as Sid Bascom
- Up The River (1930) as Inmate socked by Saint Louis (uncredited)
- The Doorway to Hell (1930) as Policeman (uncredited)
- A Connecticut Yankee (1931) as Queen's Knight (uncredited)
- Quick Millions (1931) as Cop in Montage (uncredited)
- Three Girls Lost (1931) as Airline Steward (uncredited)
- The Brat (1931) as Court Policeman (uncredited)
- The Spider (1931) as Cop (uncredited)
- Sob Sister (1931) as Ward (uncredited)
- Over the Hill (1931) as Detective Escort (uncredited)
- Arrowsmith (1931) as Cop (uncredited)
- Maker of Men (1931) as Pat (uncredited)
- Blonde Crazy (1931) as Highway Patrolman (uncredited)
- The Greeks Had a Word for Them (1932) as Taxi Driver (uncredited)
- High Speed (1932) as Ham
- Careless Lady (1932) as Cop in Raid (uncredited)
- The Trial of Vivienne Ware (1932) as Johnson (uncredited)
- Bachelor's Affairs (1932) as Cop (uncredited)
- Hello Trouble (1932) as "Heavy" Kennedy
- Hold 'Em Jail (1932) as Football Player (uncredited)
- White Eagle (1932) as Henchman Bart
- Rackety Rax (1932) as "Bick" Gilligan
- Virtue (1932) as Frank
- Air Mail (1932) as Joe Barnes (uncredited)
- Flesh (1932) as Muscles Manning (uncredited)
- Sundown Rider (1932) as Gabe Powers
- Lucky Devils (1933) as Crewman (uncredited)
- State Trooper (1933)
- Obey the Law (1933) as Kid Paris
- Unknown Valley (1933) as Elder Sneed
- When Strangers Marry (1933) as Billy McGuire
- Heroes for Sale (1933) as Red (uncredited)
- The Wrecker (1933) as Cramer
- Lady for a Day (1933) as Mounted Policeman (uncredited)
- Wild Boys of the Road (1933) as Red, the Raping Brakeman (uncredited)
- Police Car 17 (1933) as Bumps O'Neil
- College Coach (1933) as Assistant Coach (uncredited)
- Son of a Sailor (1933) as Joe (uncredited)
- Straightaway (1933) as Hobo
- The Fighting Code (1933) as Joe Krull
- Frontier Marshal (1934) as Ben Murchison
- School for Romance (1934, Short) as Husband
- Speed Wings (1934) as Henchman (uncredited)
- It Happened One Night (1934) as Bus Driver #1 (uncredited)
- The Poor Rich (1934) as Motor Cop
- The Fighting Ranger (1934) as Dave, Cougar Henchman
- Voice in the Night (1934) as Bob Hall
- Whirlpool (1934) as Farley
- The Crime of Helen Stanley (1934) as Jack Baker
- I'll Tell the World (1934) as Dirigible Officer (uncredited)
- The Most Precious Thing in Life (1934) as Head Coach Smith
- Here Comes the Groom (1934) as Second Cop
- A Man's Game (1934) as Dave Jordan
- The Circus Clown (1934) as Unimpressed Man in Audience (uncredited)
- The Defense Rests (1934) as Hood
- The Affairs of Cellini (1934) as Palace Guard Finding Cellini's Clothes (uncredited)
- Chained (1934) as Ship Steward (uncredited)
- The Human Side (1934) as Cop
- Girl in Danger (1934) as Wynkoski
- Death on the Diamond (1934) as Security Guard in Kelly's Room (uncredited)
- 6 Day Bike Rider (1934) as First Officer (uncredited)
- Against the Law (1934) as Tony Rizzo
- Men of the Night (1934) as Detective John Connors
- Broadway Bill (1934) as Morgan's Henchman (uncredited)
- Grand Old Girl (1935) as Mr. Clark (Football Coach) (uncredited)
- Under Pressure (1935) as Prize Fighter (uncredited)
- Devil Dogs of the Air (1935) as Instructor
- One New York Night (1935) as Policeman (uncredited)
- Times Square Lady (1935) as Dugan (Hockey Player) (uncredited)
- The Crimson Trail (1935) as Luke Long
- Black Fury (1935) as Mac (Company Policeman)
- Fighting Shadows (1935) as Brad Harrison
- G Men (1935) as Gunman at the Train Station (uncredited)
- Go Into Your Dance (1935) as Herman Lahey (uncredited)
- Strangers All (1935) as Ward, Assistant Film Director on Film Set (uncredited)
- Mary Jane's Pa (1935) as Roughneck Leader (uncredited)
- The Headline Woman (1935) as Johnson, Reporter
- Murder in the Fleet (1935) as 'Heavy' Johnson
- Justice of the Range (1935) as Bob Brennan
- Calm Yourself (1935) as Detective with Roscoe (uncredited)
- She Gets Her Man (1935) as Chick
- Little Big Shot (1935) as Kell's Henchman
- His Night Out (1935) as Lanky
- Waterfront Lady (1935) as Jess
- The Last Days of Pompeii (1935) as Murmex of Carthage, a gladiator (uncredited)
- Three Kids and a Queen (1935) as Relative (uncredited)
- Western Courage (1935) as Lacrosse
- Guard That Girl (1935) as Budge Edwards
- I Found Stella Parish (1935) as Roman Soldier in Play (uncredited)
- Broadway Hostess (1935) as Lucky's Henchman (uncredited)
- Too Tough to Kill (1935) as Danny (Dynamite Foreman)
- We're Only Human (1935) as Grover's Bank Robber (uncredited)
- Hitch Hike Lady (1935) as Motorcycle Officer
- Two in the Dark (1936) as Police in the Dark (uncredited)
- Muss 'Em Up (1936) as John Doe, a Gangster
- The Leathernecks Have Landed (1936) as Tex
- Boulder Dam (1936) as Pa's Guest (uncredited)
- Colleen (1936) as Sweeney (Second Officer) (uncredited)
- The First Baby (1936) as Tough Guy (uncredited)
- Pride of the Marines (1936) as Gunner Brady
- The Case Against Mrs. Ames (1936) as Newspaper Buyer (uncredited)
- Avenging Waters (1936) as Marve Slater
- Fatal Lady (1936) as American Stage Manager (uncredited)
- The Cattle Thief (1936) as Ranse Willard
- Fury (1936) as Man (uncredited)
- High Tension (1936) as Husky Man (uncredited)
- The Bride Walks Out (1936) as Taxi Driver (uncredited)
- White Fang (1936) as Thief (uncredited)
- Crash Donovan (1936) as The Drill Master
- Second Wife (1936) as 1st Partner Politician (uncredited)
- They Met in a Taxi (1936) as Policeman (uncredited)
- The Man Who Lived Twice (1936) as John 'Gloves' Baker
- The Big Game (1936) as Gambler (uncredited)
- Without Orders (1936) as Tim Casey
- Legion of Terror (1936) as Don Foster
- The Accusing Finger (1936) as Prison Guard (uncredited)
- Conflict (1936) as Gus "Knockout" Carrigan
- After the Thin Man (1936) as Party Guest (uncredited)
- Woman-Wise (1937) as Kramer (uncredited)
- You Only Live Once (1937) as Casey (Guard) (uncredited)
- Devil's Playground (1937) as Sidecar Wilson
- When's Your Birthday? (1937) as Police Detective (uncredited)
- Park Avenue Logger (1937) as Paul Sangar
- 23 1/2 Hours Leave (1937) as Top Sergeant Burke
- The Soldier and the Lady (1937) as Tartar Guard (uncredited)
- Night Key (1937) as Fingers
- They Gave Him a Gun (1937) as Military Policeman (uncredited)
- The Wildcatter (1937) as Johnson
- Mountain Music (1937) as G-Man (uncredited)
- A Fight to the Finish (1937) as Eddie Hawkins
- The Singing Marine (1937) as First Sergeant (uncredited)
- Marry the Girl (1937) as First Motorcycle Policeman (uncredited)
- Topper (1937) as Eddie (Cab Driver Slugged by Topper) (uncredited)
- Dead End (1937) as Doorman
- Escape by Night (1937) as Peter 'Spudsy' Baker
- The Game That Kills (1937) as Tom Ferguson
- Music for Madame (1937) as Violets (uncredited)
- The Westland Case (1937) as Connors (Death Row Inmate) (uncredited)
- Fight for Your Lady (1937) as Mr. Walton (uncredited)
- The Go Getter (1937) as Logger (scenes deleted)
- Souls at Sea (1937) as Sailor (uncredited)
- Penitentiary (1938) as Red Parsons (Prison Barber) (uncredited)
- Of Human Hearts (1938) as Lout Laughing in Church (uncredited)
- The Kid Comes Back (1938) as Spike (Sparring Partner) (uncredited)
- Bringing Up Baby (1938) as Motorcycle Cop at Jail (uncredited)
- Born to Be Wild (1938) as Bill Purvis
- Hawaii Calls (1938) as Muller
- Mr. Moto's Gamble (1938) as Biff Moram
- Over the Wall (1938) as Eddie Edwards
- The Adventures of Marco Polo (1938) as Mongol Guard (uncredited)
- Flight into Nowhere (1938)
- Gun Law (1938) as Pecos
- Numbered Woman (1938)
- Reformatory (1938) as Mac Grady
- Professor Beware (1938) as Motorcycle Cop (uncredited)
- Prison Break (1938) as Big Red Kincaid
- The Amazing Dr. Clitterhouse (1938) as Tug
- You Can't Take It with You (1938) as Mike, the Detective (uncredited)
- Fugitives for a Night (1938) as Gambler in Fake Fight (uncredited)
- Submarine Patrol (1938) as Seaman Olaf Swanson
- The Law West of Tombstone (1938) as Mulligan P. Martinez
- Going Places (1938) as Clarence, Policeman (uncredited)
- They Made Me a Criminal (1939) as Lenihan
- Made for Each Other (1939) as Jim Hatton (uncredited)
- Pardon Our Nerve (1939) as Kid Ramsey
- The Oklahoma Kid (1939) as Wes Handley
- Trouble in Sundown (1939) as Henchman Dusty
- Dodge City (1939) as Bud Taylor
- Mr. Moto in Danger Island (1939) as Sailor Sam (wrestler) (uncredited)
- Confessions of a Nazi Spy (1939) as an anti-Nazi American Legionnaire (uncredited)
- Union Pacific (1939) as Tracklayer (uncredited)
- The Return of the Cisco Kid (1939) as Accused Rustler
- The Kid from Kokomo (1939) as Ladislaw Klewicki
- Young Mr. Lincoln (1939) as John Palmer Cass
- The Girl from Mexico (1939) as Mexican Pete, the Wrestler
- Waterfront (1939) as Matt Hendler
- Frontier Marshal (1939) as Town Marshal
- Dust Be My Destiny (1939) as First Thug on Train (uncredited)
- Drums Along the Mohawk (1939) as Adam Hartman
- Heaven with a Barbed Wire Fence (1939) as Hunk
- Gone with the Wind (1939) as Tom, Yankee Captain
- The Cisco Kid and the Lady (1939) as Walton
- Son of Frankenstein (1939) as Gendarme at Gate (uncredited)
- The Grapes of Wrath (1940) as Needles Policeman
- Little Old New York (1940) as Regan
- Virginia City (1940) as Confederate Sergeant Checking Passengers (uncredited)
- Buck Benny Rides Again (1940) as First Outlaw
- The Mortal Storm (1940) as Franz
- Sailor's Lady (1940) as Shore Patrolman
- Kit Carson (1940) as Ape
- City for Conquest (1940) as First Policeman (uncredited)
- The Long Voyage Home (1940) as Yank
- Santa Fe Trail (1940) as Townley
- Tobacco Road (1941) as Lov Bensey
- A Man Betrayed (1941) as Floyd
- Sergeant York (1941) as Ike Botkin
- The Shepherd of the Hills (1941) as Wash Gibbs
- Manpower (1941) as Eddie Adams
- Doctors Don't Tell (1941) as Barney Millen
- The Maltese Falcon (1941) as Detective Tom Polhaus
- Swamp Water (1941) as Tim Dorson
- Know for Sure (1941, Short) as Patient (uncredited)
- Wild Bill Hickok Rides (1942) as Sheriff Edmunds
- The Falcon Takes Over (1942) as Moose Malloy (uncredited)
- Ten Gentlemen from West Point (1942) as Sergeant Scully
- Sin Town (1942) as Rock Delanry
- Hitler – Dead or Alive (1942) as Steve Maschick
- Gentleman Jim (1942) as John L. Sullivan
- In This Our Life (1942) as Extra at a Roadhouse Table (uncredited)
- Hello Frisco, Hello (1943) as Sharkey
- Slightly Dangerous (1943) as Jimmy
- They Came to Blow Up America (1943) as FBI Chief Craig
- A Guy Named Joe (1943) as Al Yackey
- The Sullivans, renamed The Fighting Sullivans (1944) as Lieutenant Commander Robinson
- Home in Indiana (1944) as Jed Bruce
- Tall in the Saddle (1944) as Judge Robert Garvey
- Dakota (1945) as Jim Bender
- They Were Expendable (1945) as BMC "Boats" Mulcahey
- Canyon Passage (1946) as Honey Bragg
- My Darling Clementine (1946) as Morgan Earp
- It's a Wonderful Life (1946) as Bert, the cop
- Unconquered (1947) as John Fraser
- The Fugitive (1947) as El Gringo
- Fort Apache (1948) as Sergeant Major Michael O'Rourke
- Sins of the Fathers (1948)
- The Time of Your Life (1948) as McCarthy
- Tap Roots (1948) as Hoab Dabney
- Joan of Arc (1948) as Captain La Hire
- 3 Godfathers (1948) as Perley "Buck" Sweet
- Singing Guns (1950) as Sheriff Jim Caradac
- Riding High (1950) as Lee
- Wagon Master (1950) as Mormon Elder Wiggs
- Kiss Tomorrow Goodbye (1950) as Inspector Charles Weber
- Operation Pacific (1951) as Commander John T. "Pop" Perry
- The Great Missouri Raid (1951) as Major Marshal Troebridge
- Only the Valiant (1951) as Corporal Timothy Gilchrist
- Bullfighter and the Lady (1951) as Narrator (voice, uncredited)
- On Dangerous Ground (1951) as Walter Brent
- The Quiet Man (1952) as Father Peter Lonergan
- Hellgate (1952) as Lieutenant Tod Voorhees
- Thunderbirds (1952) as Lieutenant John McCreery
- Blowing Wild (1953) as Dutch Peterson
- The Moonlighter (1953) as Cole Gardner
- Hondo (1953) as Buffalo Baker
- Gypsy Colt (1954) as Frank McWade
- Johnny Guitar (1954) as John McIvers
- The Bob Mathias Story (1954) as Coach Virgil Jackson
- The Long Gray Line (1955) as Captain Herman J. Kohler
- Mister Roberts (1955) as Chief Petty Officer Dowdy
- A Man Alone (1955) as Sheriff Gil Corrigan
- The Searchers (1956) as Reverend Captain Samuel Johnson Clayton
- Dakota Incident (1956) as Senator Blakely
- Pillars of the Sky (1956) as Dr. Joseph Holdon
- The Halliday Brand (1957) as Big Dan Halliday
- The Wings of Eagles (1957) as John Dodge
- China Doll (1958) as Father Cairns
- Rio Bravo (1959) as Pat Wheeler
- Alias Jesse James (1959) as Major Seth Adams (uncredited)

=== Television ===
- The Silver Theatre (1950) (Season 1 Episode 21: "My Brother's Keeper")
- The Bigelow Theatre (1951) (Season 1 Episode 24: "His Brother's Keeper") – Unknown
- The Gulf Playhouse (1952) (Season 1 Episode 2: "You Can Look It Up") – Unknown
- Schlitz Playhouse (1952) (Season 1 Episode 22: "Apple of His Eye") – Sam Stover
- The Ford Television Theatre (1953) (Season 2 Episode 12: "Gun Job") – Hank Fetterman
- General Electric Theater (1953) (Season 1 Episode 5: "Winners Never Lose") and
- The Ford Television Theatre (1954) (Season 3 Episode 3: "Segment") – Lieutenant Pannetti
- Suspense (1954) (Season 6 Episode 40: "The Hunted") – Bill Meeker
- Screen Directors Playhouse (1955) (Season 1 Episode 10: "Rookie of the Year" – Larry 'Buck' Goodhue, Alias Buck Garrison
- Cavalcade of America (1955) (Season 3 Episode 11: "The Marine Who Was Two Hundred Years Old") – Sergeant Lou Diamond
- Climax! (1955) (Season 1 Episode 13: "The Mojave Kid") – Sheriff Ab Kale
- The Christophers (1955–1958) (Episodes: "Washington as a Young Man" and "Bring Out their Greatness") – Various
- Cavalcade of America (1956) (Season 5 Episode 11: "Once a Hero") – Harvey Kendall
- Schlitz Playhouse (1956) (Season 5 Episode 33: "Plague Ship") – Captain Parker
- Schlitz Playhouse (1956) (Season 6 Episode 1: "Moment of Vengeance")
- Star Stage (1956) (Season 1 Episode 18: "The Marshal and the Mob") – Patterson
- The Steve Allen Plymouth Show (1957) (Episode: "NBC Fall Preview") – Himself
- Wagon Train (1957–1961, his death) (133 episodes) – Major Seth Adams (final appearance)
- The Steve Allen Plymouth Show (1958) (Episode: "Episode #3.16") – Himself
- General Electric Theater (1958) (Season 7 Episode 10: "A Turkey for the President")

=== Radio ===
- Family Theater – episode – The Visitor (1952)
