= Richard P. Brickner =

American writer (1933–2006)

- Born: May 14, 1933; Manhattan, New York, U.S.
- Died: May 12, 2006 (aged 72); Manhattan, New York, U.S.
- Education: Middlebury College; Columbia University (BA)
- Occupations: Novelist; editor; critic
- Awards: Guggenheim Fellowship (1983)

Richard P. Brickner (May 14, 1933 – May 12, 2006) was an American novelist, memoirist and critic.

== Biography ==
Brickner was born in Manhattan on May 14, 1933. He attended Middlebury College from 1951 to 1953, when a traffic accident left him paralyzed. He resumed his education at Columbia University, earning a bachelor's degree in 1957.

Brickner's first novel, The Broken Year (1962), was a fictional account of his injury, and was adapted as an episode of Alcoa Premiere. His other works included the novels Bringing Down the House (1971), Tickets (1981), After She Left (1988) and the memoir My Second Twenty Years: An Unexpected Life (1976).

Brickner was also an editor of Doubleday, taught at the New School for Social Research and at City College of New York, and a contributor to The New York Review of Books.

He was the recipient of a 1983 Guggenheim Fellowship. He also received a National Endowment for the Arts fellowship.

Brickner died at 72 on May 12, 2006, in Manhattan.
