= Flashing Spikes =

- Alcoa Premiere episode
- Episode no.: Season 2 Episode 1
- Directed by: John Ford
- Written by: Jameson Brewer
- Story by: Frank O'Rourke (novel)
- Presented by: Fred Astaire
- Cinematography by: William H. Clothier
- Editing by: Richard Belding; Tony Martinelli
- Original air date: October 4, 1962
- Running time: 52 min.

Guest appearances
- James Stewart as Slim Conway; Jack Warden as Baseball Commissioner; Patrick Wayne as Bill Riley; Tige Andrews as Gaby Lasalle; Carleton Young as Rex Short; Don Drysdale as Gomer; Harry Carey, Jr. as Baseball player in dugout; Vin Scully as Announcer; Edgar Buchanan as Crab Holman; John Wayne as Umpire behind pitcher (billed as Michael Morris)

Episode chronology
← Previous "The Time of the Tonsils"	Next → "Guest in the House"

"Flashing Spikes" is a 1962 television play directed by John Ford and starring James Stewart, with a lengthy surprise appearance by John Wayne, billed in the credits as "Michael Morrison" (apparently based on Wayne's birth name "Marion Michael Morrison"). The hour-long drama revolving around a disgraced ex-baseball player (Stewart) was broadcast as an episode of the anthology series Alcoa Premiere hosted by Fred Astaire.

The script was based upon a novel by Frank O'Rourke and the supporting cast includes Jack Warden, Tige Andrews, Patrick Wayne, Don Drysdale, Vin Scully, Harry Carey, Jr., and Edgar Buchanan. The Director of Photography was William H. Clothier.

This show's director John Ford, actors James Stewart and John Wayne, and cinematographer William H. Clothier also filmed The Man Who Shot Liberty Valance together the same year. Ford and his cast had made a similar show earlier, with Ford directing a half-hour baseball television drama shown on Screen Director's Playhouse in 1955 with an almost identical motif, Rookie of the Year, also with Patrick Wayne as the phenomenal young player but with his father John Wayne, Vera Miles, and Ward Bond in the leads, all of whom Ford would direct in The Searchers the following year.

"Flashing Spikes" remains available for public viewing at the Paley Center for Media in New York City and Los Angeles.
