= Alcoa Premiere =

American TV anthology series (1961–1963)

- Also known as: Premiere, Presented by Fred Astaire
- Genre: Anthology/Drama
- Directed by: John Brahm; Robert Florey; John Ford; Robert Ellis Miller; George Schaefer; Alex Segal
- Presented by: Fred Astaire
- Theme music composer: John Williams
- Composer: John Williams
- Country of origin: United States
- Original language: English
- No. of seasons: 2
- No. of episodes: 57

Production
- Executive producer: Alfred Hitchcock (episode "The Jail")
- Producers: Frank Baur (1961-62); Everett Freeman (1962); Eric Ambler (1962); John C. Champion (1962); Joan Harrison (episode "The Jail")(1962); George Schaefer (1962); Richard Berg (1963); Collier Young (1963)
- Editors: Richard Belding (1961-62); Tony Martinelli (1962)
- Camera setup: Single-camera
- Running time: 60 mins.
- Production company: Avasta Productions Revue Studios/MCA-TV

Original release
- Network: ABC
- Release: October 10, 1961 – September 12, 1963 (re-runs after April 25)

Related
- The Alcoa Hour; Alcoa Theatre

Alcoa Premiere (also known as Premiere, Presented by Fred Astaire ) is an American anthology drama series sponsored by the Alcoa Corporation that aired from October 10, 1961, to September 12, 1963, on ABC. The series was hosted by Fred Astaire, who also starred in several of the episodes.

== Overview ==
Each episode presented a new story, with no overriding theme to the series as a whole. While some episodes were light entertainment, and at least one variety show was aired, the dramatic episodes often offered powerful stories on painful or controversial subjects as opposed to classic drama. The series showcased writers such as Ray Bradbury, Howard Rodman, Ernest Kinoy, Donald S. Sanford, Alfred Bester, and Gene L. Coon, amongst others. The program also featured actors such as James Stewart, John Wayne, Charlton Heston, James Whitmore, Maureen O'Sullivan, Arthur Kennedy and Ray Milland. Both Stewart and Wayne appeared in an episode directed by John Ford, "Flashing Spikes".

The premiere telecast, "People Need People" starred Lee Marvin and Arthur Kennedy. Alex Segal was its director.

Several Alcoa Premiere episodes were actually pilots for TV shows, often produced by other hands and picked up as anthology episodes by Alcoa. Most of these pilots went no further than their appearance on Alcoa Premiere, but three series (Channing, Wide Country, and McHale's Navy) were developed from the pilot films shown on this anthology series.

One first-season episode ("The Jail") had been produced with the intention of airing as an episode of Alfred Hitchcock Presents, but was shown on Alcoa Premiere instead. The episode was written by Ray Bradbury and produced by the AHP crew, with Hitchcock credited as executive producer of the aired episode.

== Broadcast history ==
During its first season, the show was broadcast on Tuesday evenings at 10:00 pm. The show moved to Thursday evenings at the same time for its second season. Unusually, the first season of the show was contracted for 14 hour-long episodes and 14 half-hours.

== Awards ==
The anthology was nominated for 14 Emmy Awards during its two-year run.

Episode	Award Season	Nomination
"People Need People"	1961-1962	Outstanding Drama Program
"People Need People"	1961-1962	Lee Marvin, Outstanding Single Performance by a Lead Actor
"People Need People"	1961-1962	Alex Segal, Outstanding Directing in Drama
"People Need People"	1961-1962	Henry F. Greenberg, Outstanding Writing in Drama
Alcoa Premiere	1961-1962	John Williams, Outstanding Music
"The Voice of Charlie Pont"	1962-1963	Program of the Year
Alcoa Premiere	1962-1963	Outstanding Drama Program
"The Voice of Charlie Pont"	1962-1963	Bradford Dillman, Outstanding Single Performance by a Leading Actor
"The Voice of Charlie Pont"	1962-1963	Diana Hyland, Outstanding Single Performance by a Leading Actress
"The Voice of Charlie Pont"	1962-1963	Robert Redford, Outstanding Supporting Actor
"The Voice of Charlie Pont"	1962-1963	Robert Ellis Miller, Outstanding Directing in Drama
"The Voice of Charlie Pont"	1962-1963	Halsted Welles, Outstanding Writing in Drama
Alcoa Premiere	1962-1963	John Williams, Outstanding Music
"Flashing Spikes"	1962-1963	Richard Belding, Howard Epstein & Tony Martinelli, Outstanding Film Editing

== Episodes ==
=== Season 1 (1961–62) ===
No. in series	No. in season	Title	Writer(s)	Guest Stars	Original release date
1	1	"People Need People"	Henry F. Greenberg	Lee Marvin, James Gregory, Arthur Kennedy	October 10, 1961
Dr. Harry Wilmer has just 10 days to prove his radical method of treating violent war veterans will work.
2	2	"The Fugitive Eye"	Charlotte Jay (story); John Marcus (teleplay)	Charlton Heston, Leo G. Carroll	October 17, 1961
Paul Malone wakes up in a forest to find an empty limousine, a dead chauffeur and three unsavory characters staring at him.
3	3	"The Fortress"	Wallace L. Brown (story); John Kneubuhl (teleplay)	Lloyd Bridges, Philip Ahn, James Shigeta	October 24, 1961
Shot down during the Korean War, Lt. Brown is held captive in a basement where the light is never turned off. They won't treat his mangled leg unless he gives his captors a confession.
4	4	"Moment of Decision"	Stanley Ellin (story); Larry Marcus, Porter Putnam, K.H. Lindsay (teleplay)	Fred Astaire, Maureen O'Sullivan	November 7, 1961
Hugh Lozier asks for help from a mysterious man to deal with his obnoxious neighbors.
5	5	"Family Outing"	Howard Rodman	Lin McCarthy, Nancy Olson, Michael Burns	November 14, 1961
Six astronauts have been trained for the first one-man space flight and the day of the final choice has arrived.
6	6	"The Witch Next Door"	Ernest Kinoy	Susan Gordon, James Whitmore	November 28, 1961
The Collins family has a mysterious next-door neighbor and she seems to have cast a spell on young Julie Collins. This is a half-hour episode.
7	7	"The Breaking Point"	Bob Barbash	Brian Keith, Brad Dexter, Mary Murphy	December 5, 1961
An ex-convict seems to be guilty of murder until the cop realizes that only the victim's wife profits from his death.
8	8	"Delbert, Texas"	Peter Tewksbury, James Leighton	David Wayne, Florence MacMichael	December 12, 1961
Frank and Ruth Willoughby are determined to find out why their son's college grades have suddenly dropped.
9	9	"End of a World"	David Karp	Robert Loggia, Andrew Prine, Russell Johnson	December 19, 1961
The events leading up to the Sarajevo Assassination in 1914 of Archduke Ferdinand which triggered World War I are seen through the eyes of three men.
10	10	"The Cake Baker"	Peggy Shaw, Lou Shaw	Shelley Winters, Ed Nelson	December 26, 1961
A housewife is always daydreaming even on the night her young daughter runs away from home.
11	11	"Pattern of Guilt"	Helen Nielsen	Ray Milland, Joanna Moore	January 9, 1962
A reporter covers a series of murders all perpetrated against spinsters.
12	12	"The Hour of the Bath"	Donald S. Sanford	Robert Fuller, Barbara Luna	January 16, 1962
American agricultural expert Henry Detweiler is a prisoner of Vietnam under sentence of death.
13	13	"The Jail"	Ray Bradbury	John Gavin, Bettye Ackerman, Barry Morse	February 6, 1962
In this future time a young man is charged with an offense against the state and marshaled into a huge building crammed with banks and banks of computers. These computers absorb and assess the evidence, circumstances and facts in his case -- and all of them are operated by one master button-pusher. Originally intended as an episode of Alfred Hitchcock Presents, and shot, directed and produced by the AHP crew. Hitchcock is credited as executive producer of this episode.
14	14	"Mr. Easy"	Matt Taylor (story); James Brewer, Claude Binyon (teleplay)	Fred Astaire, Joanna Barnes	February 13, 1962
Andrew Whitbeck is bored with his successful business and decides to chuck it all and "enjoy himself" by becoming a cartoonist -- which is more demanding than he realizes.
15	15	"The Man With A Shine On His Shoes"	Prentiss Combs	Henry Hull, Peter Helm	February 20, 1962
An elderly drifter decides to get work on the town newspaper because he believes he is the greatest typesetter in the world.
16	16	"The Doctor"	Robert Yale Libott	Richard Kiley, Cloris Leachman	February 27, 1962
A doctor stops to give aid to an injured man, and is shortly thereafter hit with a $100,000 malpractice suit.
17	17	"Of This Time, Of This Place"	Lionel Trilling (story); Larry Marcus (teleplay)	Henry Jones, Jason Evers	March 6, 1962
A college teacher's new job is made difficult by a brilliant, but uncompromising, student. This is the pilot for the eventual 1963/64 series Channing, which starred both Jones and Evers.
18	18	"Second Chances"	Harold Swanton	Cliff Robertson, Earl Holliman, Andrew Prine	March 13, 1962
Hoby Dunlap was acquitted of treason during the Korean War, but Hoby's efforts to enter a rodeo contest are blocked by officials who fear audiences won't come see a "traitor". This episode became the pilot for the 1963-64 NBC series Wide Country .
19	19	"The Tiger"	John Durham, Harold Swanton	Gary Merrill, Keir Dullea	March 20, 1962
Someone is trying to kill Jim Hunter -- quite possibly, one of his daughter's boy friends.
20	20	"Seven Against the Sea"	Albert Aley	Ernest Borgnine, Gary Vinson	April 3, 1962
During WWII, a stranded group of American PT boat crewmen hide out on a remote South Pacific island controlled by the Japanese Navy. This drama served as a pilot for the eventual 1962-66 comedy series McHale's Navy, which starred Borgnine.
21	21	"A Very Custom Special"	Phillip Shuken	J. Pat O'Malley, True Ellison	April 10, 1962
On the night of his daughter's debutante party, a man is wiped out by the 1929 stock-market crash.
22	22	"All My Clients Are Innocent"	Jameson Brewer, Jack Finney	Barry Morse, Vic Morrow, Joan Staley	April 17, 1962
Convinced that a wife can ruin a career, San Francisco criminal lawyer Max McIntire tries to stop his partner's marriage. Pilot for an unsold series, produced by Ralph Edwards.
23	23	"Rules of the Game"	Alvin Boretz	Hugh O'Brien, Bethel Leslie	May 1, 1962
A newspaper editor discovers a man he helped to send to the electric chair was innocent.
24	24	"Cry Out in Silence"	Fred Remington (story); Alvin Boretz (teleplay)	Celeste Holm, David McLean	May 15, 1962
After having her larynx removed due to cancer, a woman struggles to learn to speak again.
25	25	"A Place to Hide"	John Hawkins, Ward Hawkins	Joan Hackett, Dean Stockwell	May 22, 1962
The nervous nature of a new housekeeper arouses the suspicions of her employers.
26	26	"The Boy Who Wasn't Wanted"	John Hawkins, Ward Hawkins	Dana Andrews, Billy Mumy	June 5, 1962
After arresting a burglar, a police detective feels responsible for the welfare of the robber's young son.
27	27	"It Takes a Thief"	Arthur Miller (story); Oscar Millard (teleplay)	Edward Andrews, Constance Ford	June 19, 1962
A robbery victim worries that he'll be in serious trouble if the police find out about one particular item stolen from his safe.
28	28	"The Time of the Tonsils"	Bob Corcoran, Jerry Layton	Eddie Albert, Butch Patrick	June 26, 1962
An orphanage director takes two children to have their tonsils out, and discovers that his must go too.

=== Season 2 (1962–63) ===
No. in series	No. in season	Title	Writer(s)	Guest Stars	Original release date
29	1	"Flashing Spikes"	Frank O'Rourke (story); Jameson Brewer (teleplay)	Patrick Wayne, James Stewart, Jack Warden, Edgar Buchanan; Cameos: John Wayne (billed as "Michael Morrison"), Don Drysdale	October 4, 1962
30	2	"Guest in the House"	Philip MacDonald (story); James Gunn (teleplay)	Fred Astaire, Susan Gordon, Lloyd Bochner	October 11, 1962
31	3	"The Long Walk Home"	Everett Freeman	Lin McCarthy, Nancy Rennick	October 18, 1962
32	4	"The Voice of Charlie Pont"	Douglas Fairbairn (story); Halsted Welles (teleplay)	Bradford Dillman, Diana Hyland, Robert Redford	October 25, 1962
33	5	"Mr. Lucifer"	Alfred Bester	Fred Astaire, Elizabeth Montgomery	November 1, 1962
34	6	"The Masked Marine"	Robert Leckie (story); John Kneubuhl, Joseph Petracca (teleplay)	Harry Guardino, James Caan	November 8, 1962
35	7	"Ordeal in Darkness"	William McGivern, Richard Fielder	Keir Dullea, Richard Conte	November 15, 1962
36	8	"Whatever Happened to Miss Illinois?"	Alvin Boretz	Carol Lynley, Anthony George, Arch Johnson	November 22, 1962
37	9	"The Hands of Danofrio"	Larry Marcus (story); James Gunn (teleplay)	Joseph Campanella, Telly Savalas	November 29, 1962
38	10	"The Contenders"	James Lee	Suzanne Pleshette, Signe Hasso, Ed Asner	December 6, 1962
39	11	"The Way From Darkness"	Oscar Millard	Shelley Winters, Joan Hackett	December 13, 1962
40	12	"The Potentate"	William Fennerton (story); David Karp (teleplay)	Theodore Bikel, Milton Selzer	December 20, 1962
41	13	"Blues For a Hanging"	John Hawkins, Ward Hawkins (story); John Hawkins (teleplay)	Fred Astaire, Janis Paige	December 27, 1962
42	14	"Impact of an Execution"	Saul Levitt, Mark Rodgers	Ralph Bellamy, Ruby Dee	January 3, 1963
43	15	"Lollipop Louie"	Fred F. Finklehoffe	Aldo Ray, Kurt Kasznar	January 10, 1963
44	16	"The Glass Palace"	Gilbert Ralston	Ricardo Montalbán, Anne Francis	January 17, 1963
45	17	"Five, Six, Pick Up Sticks"	John T. Kelly	Mickey Rooney, John Forsythe	January 24, 1963
46	18	"George Gobel Presents"	Howard Leeds, Elton Packard	George Gobel, Cliff Norton	January 31, 1963
47	19	"The Hat of Sergeant Martin"	Gene L. Coon	Claude Akins, Roger Perry	February 7, 1963
48	20	"Blow High, Blow Clear"	Harold Swanton	Tommy Sands, Jane Wyatt, Dan Duryea	February 14, 1963
49	21	"Chain Reaction"	Mitchell Wilson	Ralph Bellamy, Bradford Dillman	February 21, 1963
50	22	"Hornblower"	C.S. Forester (story); Donald Wilson (teleplay)	David Buck, Nigel Green	February 28, 1963
51	23	"Jeeney Ray"	Iris Dornfield (story); Richard DeRoy, Iris Dornfield (teleplay)	Brenda Scott, Joanna Moore	March 14, 1963
52	24	"The Dark Labyrinth"	Lawrence Durrell (story); Mark Rodgers (teleplay)	Carroll O'Connor, Patrick O'Neal	March 21, 1963
53	25	"Of Struggle and Flight"	Alvin Boretz	Janice Rule, Jack Kruschen, Dabney Coleman	March 28, 1963
54	26	"The Broken Year"	Richard P. Brickner (story); John Furia, Jr. (teleplay)	Keir Dullea, Shirley Knight	April 4, 1963
55	27	"This Will Kill You"	William Fay	Howard Morris, Ernest Borgnine	April 11, 1963
56	28	"Million Dollar Hospital"	Oscar Millard, Larry Marcus	Charles Bickford, William Shatner	April 18, 1963
57	29	"The Town That Died"	Richard DeRoy, DeWitt Copp	Dana Andrews, Gene Evans	April 25, 1963

== Production ==
Alcoa Premiere was filmed.
