= Rookie of the Year (Screen Directors Playhouse) =

- Screen Directors Playhouse episode
- Episode no.: Season 1 Episode 10
- Directed by: John Ford
- Written by: Frank Nugent; From a story by W. R. Burnett
- Cinematography by: Hal Mohr, A.S.C.
- Production code: 010
- Original air date: December 7, 1955

Guest appearances
- John Wayne; Vera Miles; Ward Bond; and introducing Pat Wayne

Episode chronology
← Previous "Tom and Jerry"	Next → "Lincoln's Doctor's Dog"

"Rookie of the Year" is a 1955 half-hour baseball drama directed by John Ford and starring John Wayne, Vera Miles, Ward Bond, and Patrick Wayne, all of whom Ford would direct in The Searchers the following year. This film was an installment of the television anthology series Screen Director's Playhouse.

A sportswriter (John Wayne) realizes that a talented young rookie (Patrick Wayne) is the son of a former Chicago White Sox player (Ward Bond), who was banned from playing Major League Baseball for life because of his participation in the 1919 World Series scandal, a.k.a. the Black Sox Scandal. All the characters in this story are fictional, but the character played by Ward Bond is strongly suggestive of the real Shoeless Joe Jackson.

Patrick Wayne would later play a similar role in a 1962 television drama, also directed by John Ford, called Flashing Spikes, starring James Stewart and featuring John Wayne in a lengthy surprise appearance for which he was billed as "Michael Morris."

== Plot ==
Sportswriter Mike Cronin discovers rookie baseball player Lyn Goodhue is the son of former major leaguer, Buck Garrison, who was banished from baseball following his participation in the infamous Black Sox Scandal. He intends to reveal this in his newspaper column, but is threatened at gunpoint by Ruth Dahlberg who wants to kill the story. In a flashback, it is revealed that Cronin's investigation led him to a man named Larry Goodhue who lived with his son, Lyn, next door to Lyn's girlfriend, Ruth Dahlberg. Ruth takes Cronin to a local baseball field where Larry is coaching young boys. Cronin recognizes Larry as Buck Garrison, surprising Ruth. Unhappy with being recognized, Garrison tells Cronin he can't prevent him from running his story, and leaves dejected. Back in the present, Ruth tells Cronin that running the story will hurt Lyn, who has done nothing to deserve it. Cronin decides not to run the story, and throws a baseball through the window of his newspaper office as he departs.

== Cast ==
- John Wayne as Mike Cronin
- Vera Miles as Ruth Dahlberg
- Ward Bond as Larry Goodhue/Buck Garrison
- Pat Wayne as Lyn Goodhue
- James Gleason as Ed Shafer
- Willis Bouchey as Cully
- Harry Tyler as Mr. White
- William Forrest as Walker
- Robert Leyden as Willie
- Tiger Fafara as Bobby
