= The Draw-Back (1927) =

1927 American silent comedy film

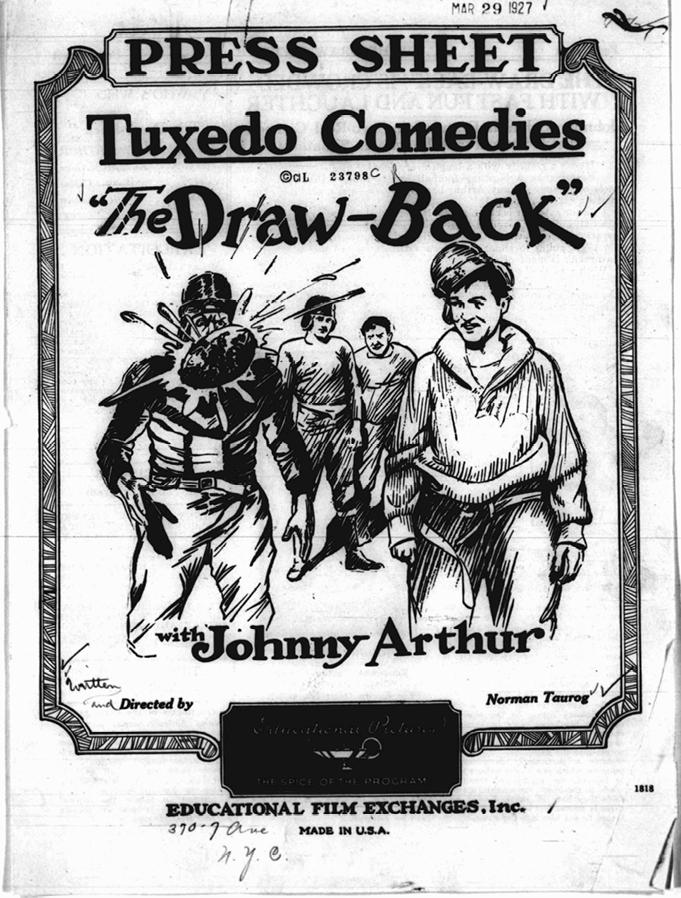
- Directed by: Norman Taurog
- Produced by: E. W. Hammons
- Production companies: Goodwill Comedies, Inc.
- Distributed by: Educational Film Exchanges
- Release date: April 10, 1927
- Running time: 2 reels (approx. 26 minutes)
- Country: United States
- Language: Silent (English intertitles)

The Draw-Back is a 1927 American silent short comedy film directed by Norman Taurog and produced by Goodwill Comedies, Inc. The film stars Johnny Arthur, Kathryn McGuire, and Wallace Lupino, and was distributed by Educational Film Exchanges as part of the Tuxedo Comedies series. The film was released on April 10, 1927, and survives in archival holdings.

== Plot ==
Horace Hayseed, a timid and physically unimpressive man from the countryside, enrolls in college only to become the target of elaborate pranks by students and faculty. His wife mistakenly believes he is a star athlete, leading to his reluctant placement on the football team. The climactic game devolves into slapstick chaos, including a mud pit on the field and a wasp nest used as a football.

The Draw Back (1927)

== Cast ==
- Johnny Arthur as Horace Hayseed
- Kathryn McGuire as The Girl
- Wallace Lupino as The College Football Captain
- Al Thompson as The College President
- Duke Morrison (John Wayne) as Football Player (uncredited)

== Production ==
The film was produced by Goodwill Comedies and presented by E. W. Hammons, a major figure in short‑form comedy distribution during the silent era. It was photographed in 35mm spherical format (1.33:1) and released as a two‑reel silent comedy. Taurog, who later won an Academy Award for Skippy (1931), was at this time an established director of short comedies.

Contemporary reports in Motion Picture News confirm the production and release details.

== Release ==
The Draw-Back was distributed by Educational Film Exchanges and released on April 10, 1927, in the United States. It formed part of the Tuxedo Comedies line, which specialized in slapstick and character‑driven humor. The film was released on April 10, 1927. It was distributed to theaters as a short comedy, suitable for inclusion in light programming blocks.

== Preservation ==
The film is not considered lost. Surviving prints are held in archival collections documented by the FIAF American Silent Feature Film Database and the Library of Congress. Cinematek (the Belgian Royal Film Archive) is Belgium’s national film archive and one of Europe’s oldest institutions dedicated to the preservation and restoration of historical cinema. The archive holds a surviving print of The Draw-Back (1927) and has restored and digitized the film from its original nitrate material. Cinematek also made the restored version publicly accessible through its official YouTube channel. The film is also available on the Internet Archive.

== Academic analysis ==
Johnny Arthur is described as playing a highly feminized, nervous, and socially awkward “sissy” type, a comic persona built around exaggerated delicacy and gender nonconformity. His characters rely on queer-coded mannerisms—soft voice, fluttery gestures, and anxious reactions—which place him in contrast with more conventionally masculine figures and make him one of early Hollywood’s clearest examples of this stereotype.

The film has been noted by CINEMATEK, the Royal Belgian Film Archive, for its early appearance by Duke Morrison (later known as John Wayne) in a minor role. The film has also been noticed for Johnny Arthur's ultra-effeminate "Nancy Boy" character that appears in the film.

== Reception ==
Exhibitors emphasized the film’s suitability for light program use. A newspaper review notes that the viewer risk "straining a rib" watching the film. One review claims that director Norman Taurog employs "original and clever gags."
