= Gene Milford =

American film and television editor (1902–1991)

- Born: Arthur Eugene Milford; January 19, 1902; Lamar, Colorado, United States
- Died: December 23, 1991 (aged 89); Santa Monica, California, United States
- Occupations: Film and television editor
- Years active: 1926–1981
- Known for: One hundred feature film credits
- Notable work: Lost Horizon - 1937; On the Waterfront - 1954; A Face in the Crowd - 1957; Wait Until Dark - 1967
- Awards: Academy Award for Best Film Editing for Lost Horizon

Arthur Eugene Milford (January 19, 1902 – December 23, 1991) was an American film and television editor with about one hundred feature film credits. Among his most noted films are Lost Horizon (directed by Frank Capra - 1937), On the Waterfront (directed by Elia Kazan - 1954), A Face in the Crowd (Kazan - 1957), and Wait Until Dark (directed by Terence Young - 1967).

Milford won the Academy Award for Best Film Editing for Lost Horizon (with Gene Havlick) and for On the Waterfront; he was also nominated for an Academy Award for One Night of Love (directed by Victor Schertzinger - 1934). He had been elected to the American Cinema Editors, and he and Barbara McLean received its inaugural Career Achievement Awards in 1988.

== Partial filmography ==
Gene Milford began his career as an editor.

Based on Milford's filmography at the Internet Movie Database.

The director and release date of each film are indicated in parentheses.

With more than 90 film credits dating from 1926, his film editing work includes:

With more than 100 film credits dating from 1951, his TV editing work includes:

Editor
Year	Film	Director	Notes	Other notes
1926	Two Can Play	Nat Ross		
1927	Say It with Diamonds	Jack Nelson; Arthur Gregor		
1927	Ladies at Ease	Jerome Storm		
1928	Comrades	Cliff Wheeler		
1928	Free Lips	Wallace MacDonald		
1928	The Devil's Cage	Wilfred Noy		
1928	The Masked Angel	Frank O'Connor		
1928	Life's Mockery	Robert F. Hill		
1929	Flight	Frank Capra	First collaboration with Frank Capra	
1930	Vengeance	Archie Mayo		
1930	Around the Corner	Bert Glennon		
1930	Ladies Must Play	Raymond Cannon	First collaboration with Raymond Cannon	
1931	The Lion and the Lamb	George B. Seitz	First collaboration with George B. Seitz	
1931	The Flood	James Tinling		
1931	The Texas Ranger	D. Ross Lederman	First collaboration with D. Ross Lederman	
1931	Arizona	George B. Seitz	Second collaboration with George B. Seitz	
1931	Branded	D. Ross Lederman	Second collaboration with D. Ross Lederman	Uncredited
1931	Shanghaied Love	George B. Seitz	Third collaboration with George B. Seitz	
1931	Platinum Blonde	Frank Capra	Second collaboration with Frank Capra	
1931	One Man Law	Lambert Hillyer	First collaboration with Lambert Hillyer	
1931	Maker of Men	Edward Sedgwick		
1932	The Big Timer	Edward Buzzell		
1932	Hello Trouble	Lambert Hillyer	Second collaboration with Lambert Hillyer	
1932	McKenna of the Mounted	D. Ross Lederman	Third collaboration with D. Ross Lederman	
1932	White Eagle	Lambert Hillyer	Third collaboration with Lambert Hillyer	
1932	Forbidden Trail	Lambert Hillyer	Fourth collaboration with Lambert Hillyer	
1932	Sundown Rider	Lambert Hillyer	Fifth collaboration with Lambert Hillyer	
1933	The California Trail	Lambert Hillyer	Sixth collaboration with Lambert Hillyer	
1933	The Thrill Hunter	George B. Seitz	Fourth collaboration with George B. Seitz	
1933	Brief Moment	David Burton	First collaboration with David Burton	
1933	My Woman	Victor Schertzinger	First collaboration with Victor Schertzinger	
1933	Let's Fall in Love	David Burton	Second collaboration with David Burton	
1934	The Ninth Guest	Roy William Neill		
1934	The Fighting Ranger	George B. Seitz	Fifth collaboration with George B. Seitz	
1934	The Man Trailer	Lambert Hillyer	Seventh collaboration with Lambert Hillyer	
1934	Sisters Under the Skin	David Burton	Third collaboration with David Burton	
1934	One Night of Love	Victor Schertzinger	Second collaboration with Victor Schertzinger	
1934	The Captain Hates the Sea	Lewis Milestone		
1935	Carnival	Walter Lang		
1935	Let's Live Tonight	Victor Schertzinger	Third collaboration with Victor Schertzinger	
1935	Fighting Shadows	David Selman	First collaboration with David Selman	
1935	Love Me Forever	Victor Schertzinger	Fourth collaboration with Victor Schertzinger	
1935	The Public Menace	Erle C. Kenton	First collaboration with Erle C. Kenton	
1935	Grand Exit	Erle C. Kenton	Second collaboration with Erle C. Kenton	
1935	Too Tough to Kill	D. Ross Lederman	Fourth collaboration with D. Ross Lederman	
1936	The Music Goes 'Round	Victor Schertzinger	Fifth collaboration with Victor Schertzinger	
1936	And So They Were Married	Elliott Nugent		
1936	Shakedown	David Selman	Second collaboration with David Selman	
1936	They Met in a Taxi	Alfred E. Green	First collaboration with Alfred E. Green	
1937	When You're in Love	Robert Riskin		
1937	Lost Horizon	Frank Capra	Third collaboration with Frank Capra	
1937	The League of Frightened Men	Alfred E. Green	Second collaboration with Alfred E. Green	
1937	It Can't Last Forever	Hamilton MacFadden		
1937	Something to Sing About	Victor Schertzinger	Sixth collaboration with Victor Schertzinger	
1938	Tarzan's Revenge	D. Ross Lederman	Fifth collaboration with D. Ross Lederman	
1938	Mr. Boggs Steps Out	Gordon Wiles		
1938	The Overland Express	Drew Eberson		
1939	The Mikado	Victor Schertzinger	Seventh collaboration with Victor Schertzinger	
1939	I Was a Convict	Aubrey Scotto		
1939	Frontier Pony Express	Joseph Kane		
1939	Coast Guard	Edward Ludwig		
1939	Those High Grey Walls	Charles Vidor		
1940	Military Academy	D. Ross Lederman	Sixth collaboration with D. Ross Lederman	
1940	Blondie Plays Cupid	Frank R. Strayer		
1941	Tillie the Toiler	Sidney Salkow		
1941	The Stork Pays Off	Lew Landers		
1941	Confessions of Boston Blackie	Edward Dmytryk		
1943	Higher and Higher	Tim Whelan	First collaboration with Tim Whelan	
1944	The Falcon Out West	William Clemens		
1944	Step Lively	Tim Whelan	Second collaboration with Tim Whelan	
1944	The Falcon in Hollywood	Gordon Douglas		
1945	Having Wonderful Crime	A. Edward Sutherland		
1945	China Sky	Ray Enright		
1951	The Man with My Face	Edward Montagne		
1954	On the Waterfront	Elia Kazan	First collaboration with Elia Kazan	
1955	Man with the Gun	Richard Wilson		
1956	Baby Doll	Elia Kazan	Second collaboration with Elia Kazan	
1957	A Face in the Crowd	Elia Kazan	Third collaboration with Elia Kazan	
1961	Splendor in the Grass	Elia Kazan	Fourth collaboration with Elia Kazan	
1961	Force of Impulse	Saul Swimmer		
1962	Taras Bulba	J. Lee Thompson		
1963	Rampage	Phil Karlson		
1964	Wild and Wonderful	Michael Anderson		
1964	The New Interns	John Rich		
1965	Strange Bedfellows	Melvin Frank		
1965	That Funny Feeling	Richard Thorpe		
1966	The Chase	Arthur Penn		
1966	Incident at Phantom Hill	Earl Bellamy		
1966	Texas Across the River	Michael Gordon		
1967	Countdown	Robert Altman		
1967	Wait Until Dark	Terence Young	First collaboration with Terence Young	
1969	The Great Bank Robbery	Hy Averback		
1970	There Was a Crooked Man...	Joseph L. Mankiewicz		
1971	Mrs. Pollifax-Spy	Leslie H. Martinson		
1971	The Steagle	Paul Sylbert		Uncredited
1974	W	Richard Quine		
1974	The Klansman	Terence Young	Second collaboration with Terence Young	

Editorial department
Year	Film	Director	Role	Notes	Other notes
1938	Swing It, Sailor!	Raymond Cannon	Supervising editor	Second collaboration with Raymond Cannon	Uncredited
1981	Inchon	Terence Young	Supervising film editor	Third collaboration with Terence Young	

Director
Year	Film
1958	The Pusher

Producer
Year	Film	Director	Credit
1958	The Pusher	Himself	Producer

Documentaries

Editor
Year	Film	Director
1942	The World at War	Lowell Mellett

Short documentaries

Editor
Year	Film	Director
1940	Look to Lockheed for Leadership	Shirley Burden
1946	Kentucky Basketeers	Joseph Walsh
1946	Battle for Survival	—N/a

Shorts

Editor
Year	Film	Director
1962	On the Harmfulness of Tobacco	Paul Newman

TV documentaries

Editor
Year	Film	Director
1957	Maurice Chevalier's Paris	Andrew Marton

TV movies

Editor
Year	Film	Director
1967	Valley of Mystery	Joseph Lejtes
1972	No Place to Run	Delbert Mann
1973	The Man Without a Country	Delbert Mann
1973	Miracle on 34th Street	Fielder Cook
1974	A Tree Grows in Brooklyn	Joseph Hardy
1975	The Count of Monte Cristo	David Greene
1978	Breaking Up	Delbert Mann
1978	Home to Stay	Delbert Mann
1979	Torn Between Two Lovers	Delbert Mann
1979	And Baby Makes Six	Waris Hussein

Editorial department
Year	Film	Director	Role
1977	Tell Me My Name	Delbert Mann	Supervising editor
1978	Lovey: A Circle of Children, Part II	Jud Taylor	Supervising editor

TV pilots

Editorial department
Year	Film	Director	Role
1977	The World of Darkness	Jerry London	Supervising editor
1978	The World Beyond	Noel Black	Supervising editor

TV series

Editor
Year	Title	Notes
1971−72	Nichols	9 episodes
1972	The Rookies	2 episodes

Director
Year	Title	Notes
1951	The Faye Emerson Show	14 episodes
1953−56	Omnibus	2 episodes

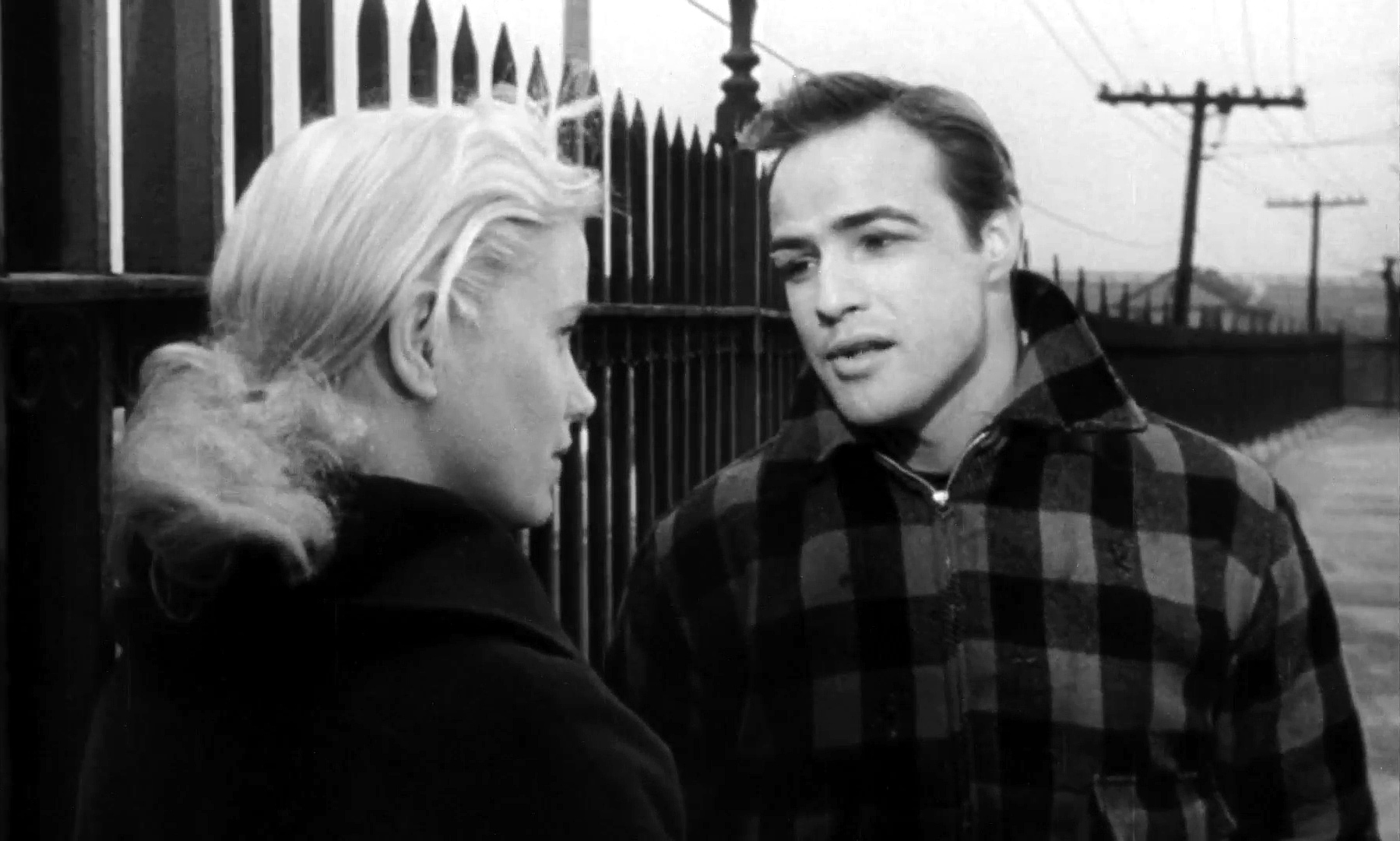
Marlon Brando and Eva Marie Saint in the trailer for the 1954 film On the Waterfront, for which Milford won the Academy Award for Best Film Editing
