= The Cruise of the Hellion =

1927 film

- Directed by: Duke Worne
- Written by: George W. Pyper
- Produced by: Duke Worne
- Starring: Donald Keith; Edna Murphy; Tom Santschi
- Cinematography: Walter L. Griffin
- Production company: Duke Worne Productions
- Distributed by: Rayart Pictures
- Release date: September 10, 1927
- Running time: 70 minutes
- Country: United States
- Languages: Silent; English intertitles

The Cruise of the Hellion is a 1927 American silent drama film directed by Duke Worne and starring Donald Keith, Edna Murphy and Tom Santschi.

== Cast ==
- Donald Keith as Jack Harlan
- Edna Murphy as Diana Drake
- Tom Santschi as Kilroy
- Sheldon Lewis as Capt. Drake
- Sailor Sharkey as Reid
- Charles K. French as John Harlan
- Francis Ford as Peg-leg

== Bibliography ==
- Munden, Kenneth White. The American Film Institute Catalog of Motion Pictures Produced in the United States, Part 1. University of California Press, 1997.
