= Cyrus J. Williams =

American film producer

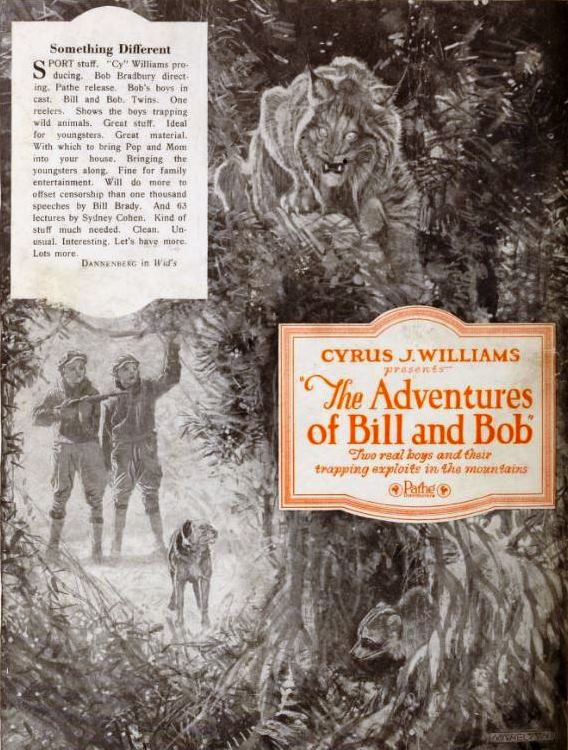
Advertisement for The Adventures of Bill and Bob

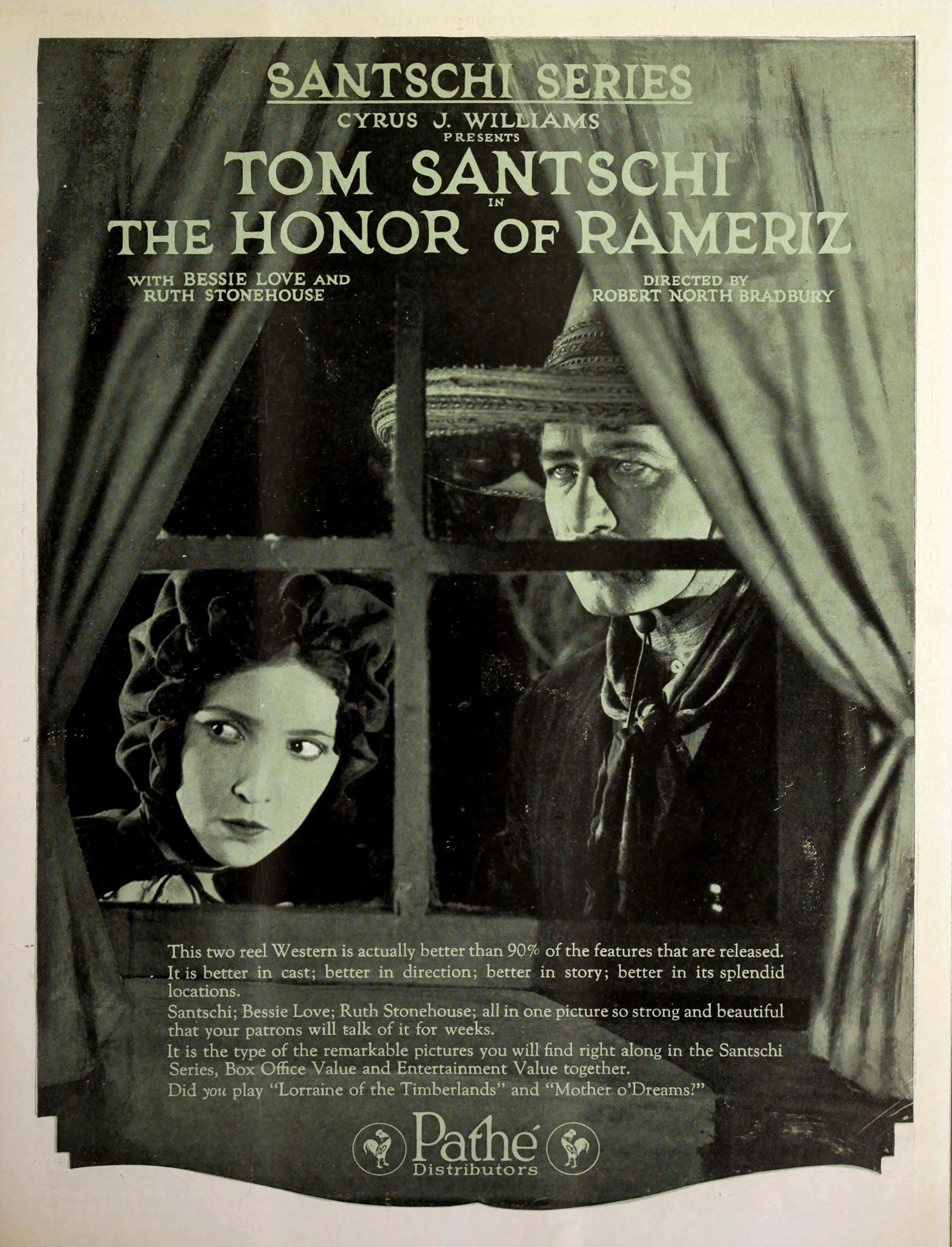
Advertisement for The Honor of Rameriz in the Santschi Series of Westerns

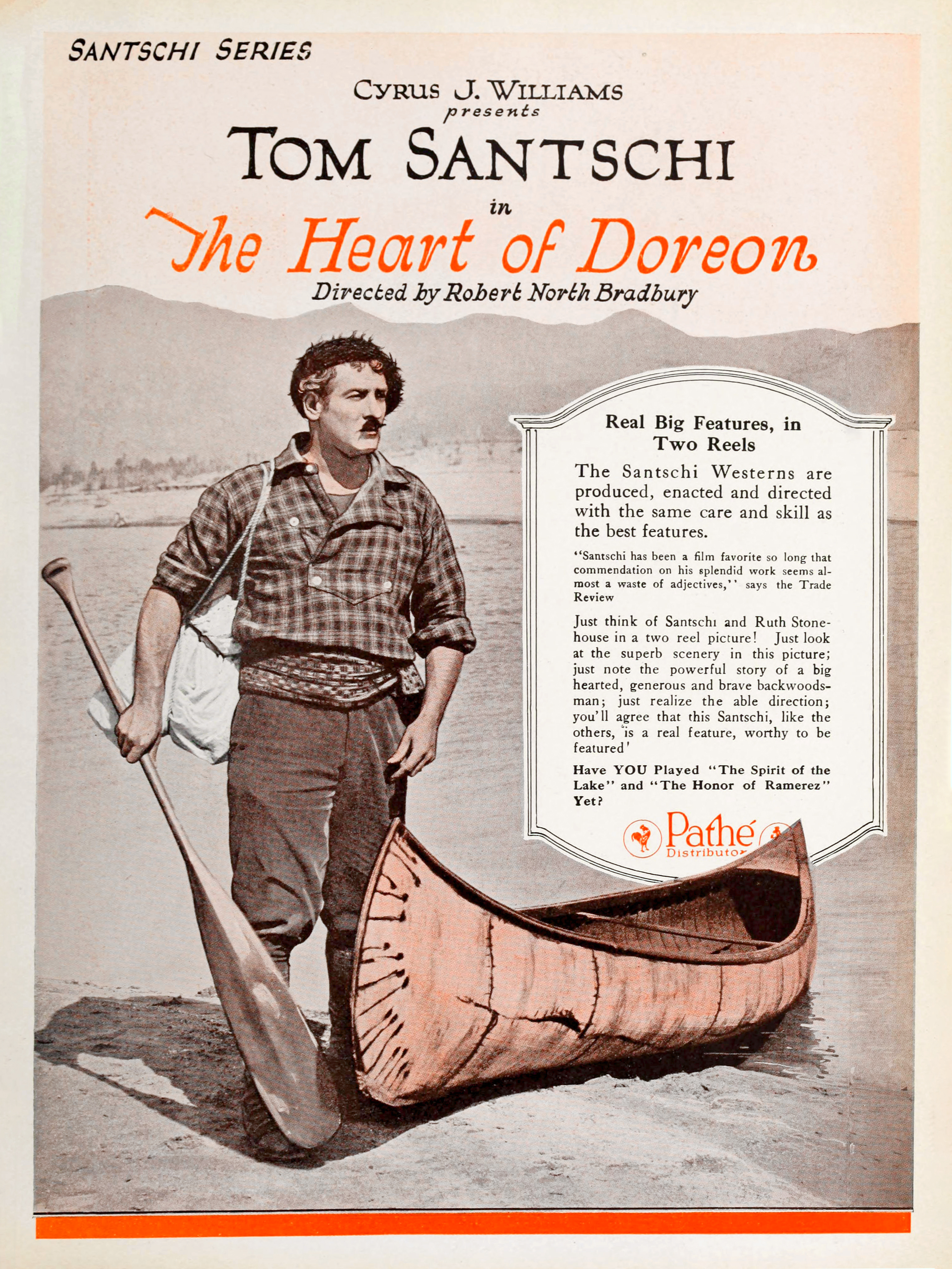
Advertisement for The Heart of Doreon

Cyrus J. Williams was a film producer and the co-founder of Cyrus J. Williams Productions. It was at 4811 Fountain Avenue in Hollywood. He worked in the real estate business before his foray into films.

Several of his films were distributed by Pathé Exchange. Ruth Stonehouse and Tom Santschi signed contracts to star in his productions. Williams' films include a series of Western films known as the "Santschi Series". Williams also produced The Adventures of Bill and Bob boy trapper series.

Captain Albert C. Jones co-founded the company with Williams and was involved in operations.

In March 2019, Grapevine Video launched a Kickstarter campaign to fund the release of the Bill and Bob Adventures films to DVD.

His 1920 film Into the Light (film) starred Patricia Palmer.

== Filmography ==
- The Adventures of Bill and Bob (1920), a series of boyhood adventure films
- Things Men Do / Into the Light (film) (1920), based on the story "Into the Light"
- The Honor of Rameriz (1921)
- The Spirit of the Lake (1921)
- Lorraine of the Timberlands (1921)
- The Heart of Doreon (1921)
- Mother o' Dreams (1921)
