= Into No Man's Land =

1928 film directed by Cliff Wheeler

- Directed by: Cliff Wheeler
- Written by: Bennett Southard; Elsie Werner
- Produced by: Samuel Zierler; Burton L. King
- Starring: Tom Santschi; Betty Blythe; Crauford Kent
- Cinematography: Ted Tetzlaff
- Production company: Excellent Pictures
- Distributed by: Excellent Pictures
- Release date: June 15, 1928
- Running time: 65 minutes
- Country: United States
- Languages: Silent; English intertitles

Into No Man's Land is a 1928 American silent war drama film directed by Cliff Wheeler and starring Tom Santschi, Betty Blythe, and Crauford Kent.

== Synopsis ==
A refined criminal keeps his life secret from his daughter. When he gets trouble from the police after shooting one of his underworld associates, he enlists in the US Army and goes to fight in France during World War I. While in France, he serves alongside a young man who is in love with his daughter.

== Cast ==
- Tom Santschi as Thomas Blaisdell / Western Evans
- Josephine Norman as Florence Blaisdell
- Jack Dougherty as Clayton Taggart
- Betty Blythe as The Countess
- Crauford Kent as The Duke
- Mary McAllister as Katherine Taggart
- Syd Crossley as Happy

== Bibliography ==
- Munden, Kenneth White. The American Film Institute Catalog of Motion Pictures Produced in the United States, Part 1. University of California Press, 1997.
