= Top Sergeant Mulligan =

Top Sergeant Mulligan may refer to:

- Top Sergeant Mulligan (1928 film), American silent comedy film
- Top Sergeant Mulligan (1941 film), American comedy film
