= Donald Keith (actor) =

American actor

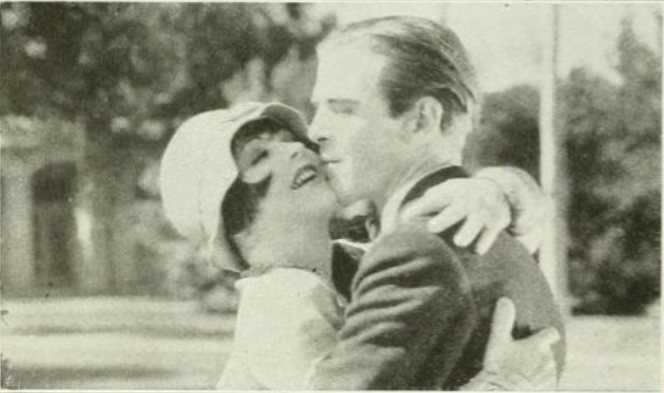
- Donald Keith with Clara Bow in The Plastic Age (1926)
- Born: Francis Thornton Feeney; September 6, 1903; Boston, Massachusetts, U.S.
- Died: August 1, 1969 (aged 65); Los Angeles, California, U.S.
- Occupation: Actor
- Years active: 1918–1936

Donald Keith (born Francis Feeney, September 6, 1903 – August 1, 1969) was an American silent film actor remembered for costarring with Clara Bow in several films in the 1920s. He occasionally appeared in films under the aliases of Francis Feeney and Eugene O'Brien. Keith married Kathryn Spicuzza at the Church of the Blessed Sacrament in Hollywood on February 27, 1927. His screen career ended in 1936.

== Partial filmography ==
- Secrets (1924)
- K – The Unknown (1924)
- Baree, Son of Kazan (1925)
- Parisian Love (1925)
- The Boomerang (1925)
- Free to Love (1925)
- With This Ring (1925)
- My Lady of Whims (1925)
- The Plastic Age (1925)
- Dancing Mothers (1926)
- Collegiate (1926)
- We're in the Navy Now (1926)
- The Cruise of the Hellion (1927)
- Broadway Madness (1927)
- The Whirlwind of Youth (1927)
- Special Delivery (1927)
- The Way of All Flesh (1927)
- Wild Geese (1927)
- Bare Knees (1928)
- Top Sergeant Mulligan (1928)
- The Devil's Cage (1928)
- Should a Girl Marry? (1928)
- Comrades (1928)
- Just Off Broadway (1929)
- The Lone Wolf's Daughter (1929)
- Branded Men (1931)
- The Midnight Lady (1932)
- The Arm of the Law (1932)
- Speed Madness (1932)
- Outlaw Justice (1932)
- The Big Bluff (1933)
