= Elsie Werner =

American silent film screenwriter

- Occupation: Screenwriter
- Years active: 1925–1928

Elsie Werner was an American screenwriter of silent films; she was active in Hollywood in the 1920s.

== Selected filmography ==
- Making the Varsity (1928)
- Into No Man's Land (1928)
- A Bit of Heaven (1928)
- The Shadow on the Wall (1925)
