= The Spirit of the Lake =

1921 film

- Directed by: Robert North Bradbury
- Produced by: Cyrus J. Williams
- Starring: Tom Santschi; Bessie Love; Ruth Stonehouse
- Distributed by: Pathé Exchange
- Release date: October 30, 1921 (U.S.)
- Running time: 2 reels
- Country: United States
- Language: Silent (English intertitles)

The Spirit of the Lake is a 1921 American short silent Western film produced by Cyrus J. Williams and distributed by Pathé Exchange. It was directed by Robert North Bradbury and stars Tom Santschi, Bessie Love, and Ruth Stonehouse.

This short film was part of the "Santschi Series", which included the other short films The Honor of Rameriz, The Heart of Doreon, Lorraine of the Timberlands, and Mother o' Dreams, all of which starred Santschi.

The film is presumed lost.

== Plot ==
A hermit who lives by a lake falls for a distressed young woman whom he aids.

== Cast ==
- Tom Santschi
- Bessie Love
- Ruth Stonehouse
- Edward Hearn
- Tom Lingham

== Production ==
Some outdoor scenes were filmed at Keen's Camp in Riverside County.

== Release ==
Upon its release, some theaters showed this short with The Idle Rich; some other theaters showed it with a re-release of Chaplin's Carmen.
