= Mother o' Dreams =

1921 film

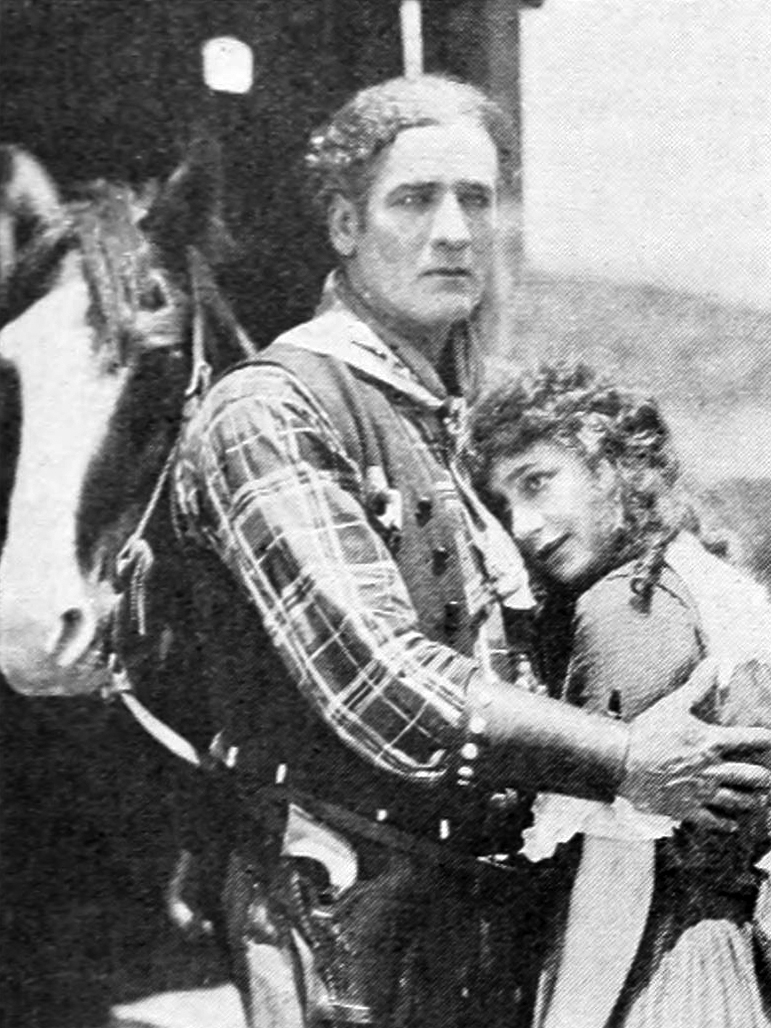
- Film still
- Directed by: Robert North Bradbury
- Produced by: Cyrus J. Williams
- Starring: Tom Santschi; Ruth Stonehouse
- Distributed by: Pathé Exchange
- Release date: September 18, 1921 (U.S.)
- Running time: 2 reels
- Country: United States
- Languages: Silent; English intertitles

Mother o' Dreams is a 1921 American silent Western film produced by Cyrus J. Williams and distributed by Pathé Exchange. It was directed by Robert North Bradbury and stars Tom Santschi and Ruth Stonehouse.

This short film was part of the "Santschi Series", which included the other short films The Honor of Rameriz, The Spirit of the Lake, The Heart of Doreon, and Lorraine of the Timberlands, all of which starred Santschi.

There is an unrelated 1914 Essanay short film with the same title which starred Richard C. Travers, Gerda Holmes, and Bryant Washburn.

== Plot ==
Wandering artist (Santschi) encounters a young girl (Stonehouse) and her grandmother who are being victimized by the grandmother's son, who seeks to take control of her property. The artist intervenes, preserving the grandmother's property, independence, and ability to care for her granddaughter.

== Cast ==
- Tom Santschi
- Ruth Stonehouse

== Reception ==
Santschi's performance was well-received.
