= Lights Out (1923 film) =

1923 film

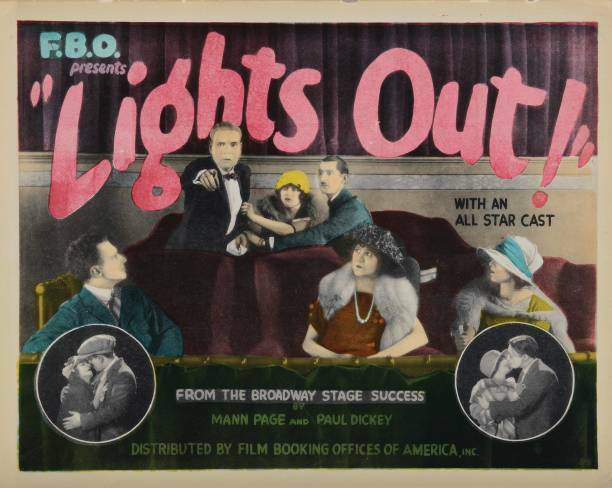
- Directed by: Alfred Santell
- Written by: Rex Taylor
- Based on: Lights Out by Paul Dickey and Mann Page
- Starring: Ruth Stonehouse; Walter McGrail; Theodore von Eltz
- Cinematography: William Marshall
- Production company: Robertson-Cole Pictures Corporation
- Distributed by: Film Booking Offices of America
- Release date: November 11, 1923
- Running time: 70 minutes
- Country: United States
- Languages: Silent; English intertitles

Lights Out is a 1923 American silent crime drama film directed by Alfred Santell and starring Ruth Stonehouse, Walter McGrail and Theodore von Eltz. It is based on the 1922 play Lights Out by Paul Dickey and Mann Page, later adapted into the 1938 film Crashing Hollywood. The remake was more light-hearted than the melodramatic tone of the original.

== Synopsis ==
Two criminals encounter a screenwriter on a train and persuade him to create a screenplay about the criminal underworld. In an attempt to revenge themselves on one of their former associates, they negatively depict him in the work. After seeing the film he heads to the film studio seeking revenge.

== Cast ==
- Ruth Stonehouse as Hairpin Annie
- Walter McGrail as Sea Bass
- Marie Astaire as Barbara
- Theodore von Eltz as Eggs'
- Ben Deeley as High-Shine Joe
- Hank Mann as Ben
- Ben Hewlett as Keith Forbes
- Mabel Van Buren as Mrs. Gallant
- Fred Kelsey as Decker
- Harry Fenwick as Peyton
- Chester Bishop as Bangs, a movie director
- Max Asher as Wellabach, a movie producer

== Preservation ==
Previously thought lost, Russian film archive Gosfilmofond had a print and made a digital copy of it and gifted it to the Library of Congress under the wrong title in 2010. It wasn't discovered until 2023 that it was realized to be this title, or that this title survived in any form. It was made available as a digital download, DVD and Blu-ray on Kickstarter from silent film enthusiast and restorer Joseph Harvat.

== Bibliography ==
- Connelly, Robert B. The Silents: Silent Feature Films, 1910-36, Volume 40, Issue 2. December Press, 1998.
- Goble, Alan. The Complete Index to Literary Sources in Film. Walter de Gruyter, 1999.
- Munden, Kenneth White. The American Film Institute Catalog of Motion Pictures Produced in the United States, Part 1. University of California Press, 1997.
