= Broadway Madness =

1927 film directed by Burton L. King

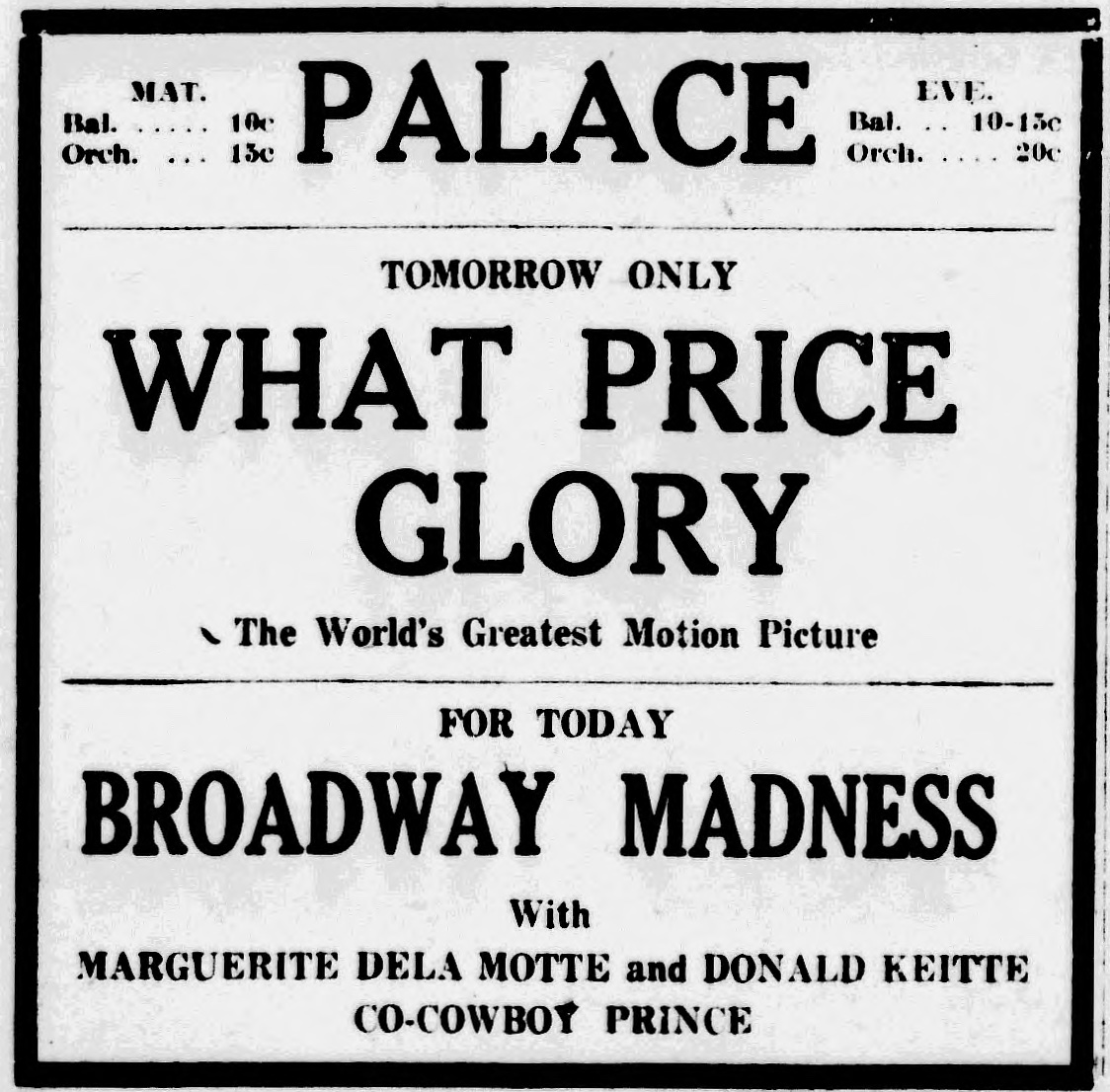
- Contemporary advertisement
- Directed by: Burton L. King
- Written by: Harry Chandlee
- Produced by: Samuel Zierler; Harry Chandlee
- Starring: Marguerite De La Motte; Donald Keith; Betty Hilburn
- Cinematography: Arthur Reeves
- Production company: Excellent Pictures
- Distributed by: Excellent Pictures
- Release date: October 1, 1927
- Running time: 70 minutes
- Country: United States
- Language: Silent (English intertitles)

Broadway Madness is a 1927 American silent romantic drama film directed by Burton L. King and starring Marguerite De La Motte, Donald Keith, and Betty Hilburn.

== Plot ==
A young farmer in upstate New York City becomes obsessed with a Broadway actress due to her radio broadcasts. She later becomes involved in a plot to defraud him of his inheritance, but instead falls in love and confesses everything to him.

== Cast ==
- Marguerite De La Motte as Maida Vincent
- Donald Keith as David Ross
- Betty Hilburn as Josie Dare
- Margaret Cloud as Mary Vaughn
- George Cowl as Henry Ableton
- Louis Payne as Jared Ableton
- Robert Dudley as Thomas
- Orral Humphrey as Larry Doyle
- Tom Ricketts as Lawrence Compton
- Alfred Fisher as Ev
- Jack Haley as Radio Announcer

== Preservation ==
With no copies listed in any film archives, Broadway Madness is a lost film.

== Bibliography ==
- Munden, Kenneth White. The American Film Institute Catalog of Motion Pictures Produced in the United States, Part 1. University of California Press, 1997.
