= Just Off Broadway (1929 film) =

1929 film

- Directed by: Frank O'Connor
- Written by: Fanny D'Morgal; Arthur Hoerl; Lon Young
- Starring: Donald Keith; Ann Christy; Larry Steers
- Cinematography: M.A. Anderson
- Edited by: James Sweeney
- Production company: Chesterfield Pictures
- Distributed by: Chesterfield Pictures
- Release date: May 1, 1929
- Running time: 70 minutes
- Country: United States
- Languages: Silent; English intertitles

Just Off Broadway is a 1929 American silent drama film directed by Frank O'Connor and starring Donald Keith, Ann Christy and Larry Steers.

== Plot ==
The film

== Cast ==
- Donald Keith as Tom Fowler
- Ann Christy as Nan Morgan
- Larry Steers as Marty Kirkland
- De Sacia Mooers as Rene
- Jack Tanner as William Grady
- Syd Saylor as Bennie Barnett
- Beryl Roberts as Bessie
- Curley Dresden as Ed Fowler

== Bibliography ==
- Michael R. Pitts. Poverty Row Studios, 1929-1940: An Illustrated History of 55 Independent Film Companies, with a Filmography for Each. McFarland & Company, 2005.
