= One Splendid Hour =

1929 film directed by Cliff Wheeler

- Directed by: Cliff Wheeler
- Written by: Isadore Bernstein; Sylvia Bernstein; Jacques Jaccard; Adeline Leitzbach
- Produced by: Samuel Zierler; Burton L. King
- Starring: Viola Dana; George Periolat; Jack Richardson
- Cinematography: Walter Haas; William Miller
- Edited by: Betty Davis
- Production company: Excellent Pictures
- Distributed by: Excellent Pictures
- Release date: May 1, 1929
- Running time: 67 minutes
- Country: United States
- Languages: Silent; English intertitles

One Splendid Hour is a 1929 American silent drama film directed by Cliff Wheeler and starring Viola Dana, George Periolat and Jack Richardson. Dana retired following the film, due to the introduction of sound films.

== Synopsis ==
A socialite goes slumming a poor neighbourhood where she meets a Doctor. In order to attract his attention she disguises herself as a wayward girl.

== Cast ==
- Viola Dana as Bobbie Walsh
- George Periolat as Senator Walsh
- Allan Simpson as Dr. Thornton
- Lewis Sargent as Jimmy O'Shea
- Jack Richardson as Peter Hoag
- Lucy Beaumont as Mother Kelly
- Florice Cooper as Rose Kelly
- Ernie Adams as Solly
- Hugh Saxon as The Roué
- Charles H. Hickman as Police Captain

== Bibliography ==
- Lowe, Denise. An Encyclopedic Dictionary of Women in Early American Films: 1895-1930. Routledge, 2014.
