= The Kid Sister (1927 film) =

1927 film

- Directed by: Ralph Graves
- Written by: Dorothy Howell; Harry O. Hoyt
- Produced by: Harry Cohn
- Starring: Marguerite De La Motte; Ann Christy; Malcolm McGregor
- Cinematography: J.O. Taylor
- Production company: Columbia Pictures
- Distributed by: Columbia Pictures
- Release date: July 5, 1927
- Running time: 63 minutes
- Country: United States
- Languages: Silent; English intertitles

The Kid Sister is a lost 1927 American silent drama film directed by Ralph Graves and starring Marguerite De La Motte, Ann Christy and Malcolm McGregor.

A small-town girl goes to join her elder sister who is working as a chorus girl in New York City, but soon becomes disillusioned with city life.

== Cast ==
- Marguerite De La Motte as Helen Hall
- Ann Christy as Mary Hall
- Malcolm McGregor as Thomas Webster
- Brooks Benedict as Ted Hunter
- Tom Dugan as Stage Manager
- Sally Long as Ann Howe
- Barrett Greenwood as Ann's Friend

== Bibliography ==
- Munden, Kenneth White. The American Film Institute Catalog of Motion Pictures Produced in the United States, Part 1. University of California Press, 1997.
