= Ann Christy (actress) =

American actress

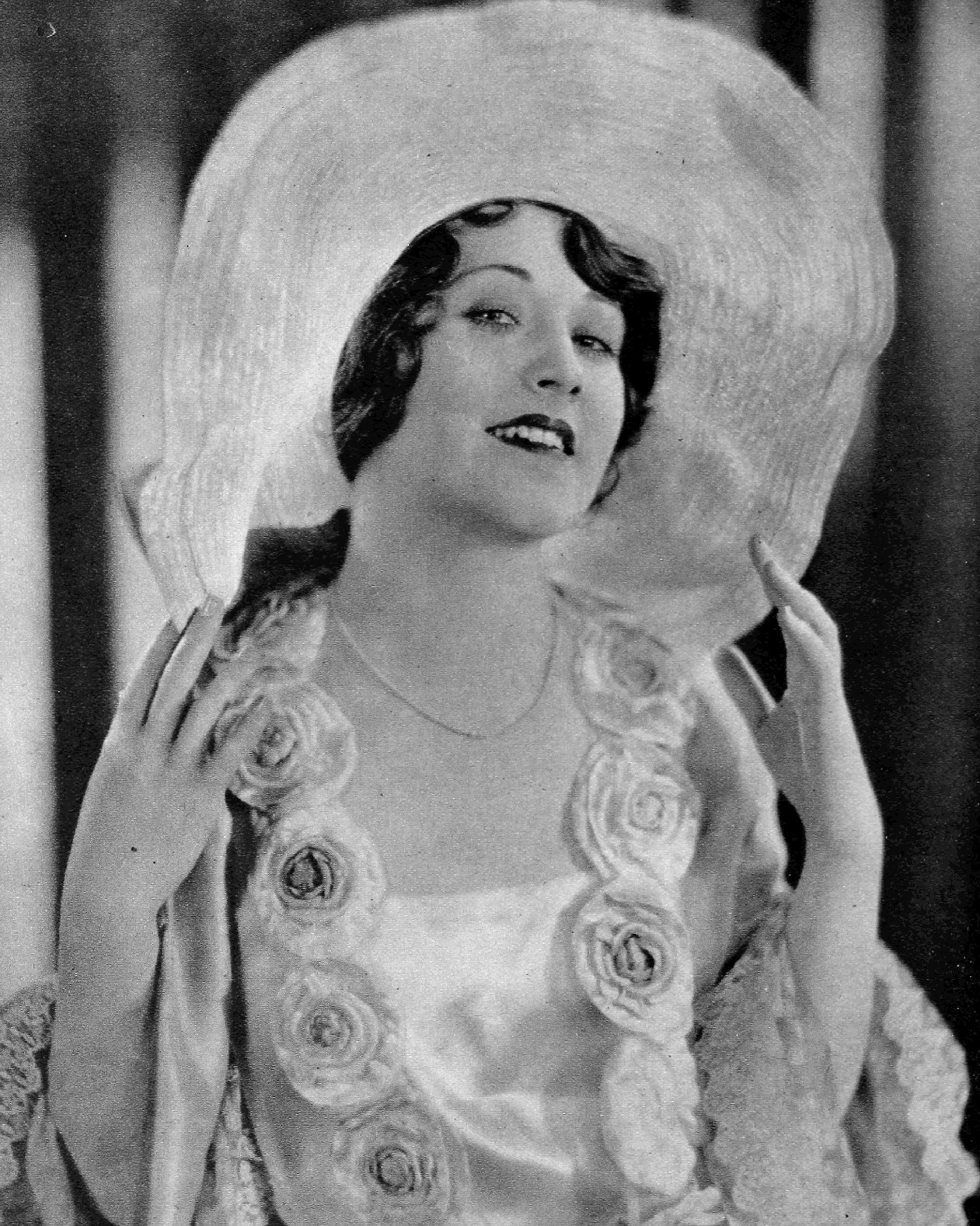
- Christy in 1927
- Born: Gladys Cronin; May 31, 1905; Logansport, Indiana, U.S.
- Died: November 14, 1987 (aged 82); Vernon, Texas, U.S.
- Occupation: Actress
- Years active: 1927–1932
- Spouse: Robert Lee More Jr (1933–1972) (his death)

Ann Christy (born Gladys Cronin; May 31, 1905 – November 14, 1987) was an American motion picture actress, whose screen career was relatively brief, spanning only five years, from 1927 in the late silent era to the early years of sound.

== Career ==
Born Gladys Cronin in Logansport, Indiana, Christy left Indiana and relocated to California where she attended Polytechnic High School in Los Angeles. She intended to pursue a career in business, but was persuaded by friends to try acting. She made her film debut in a bit part in the 1927 film Long Pants, starring Harry Langdon. That same year, she was awarded an Al Christie comedy leading lady film contract in May 1927. She appeared in film comedies with Bobby Vernon and Neal Burns. In 1928, Christy was selected by Harold Lloyd from more than fifty applicants to play his leading lady in the comedy Speedy (1928). That same year, she was selected one of thirteen WAMPAS Baby Stars.

Following her success in Speedy, Christy vacationed in New York. When she returned to Hollywood, she discovered that she had been forgotten. She returned to acting with parts in collegian film serials with Universal Pictures. She made her last onscreen appearance in the 1932 film Behind Stone Walls, starring Edward J. Nugent.

== Personal life and death ==
In 1931, Christy sued the Herbert M. Baruch Corporation for $100,730 in damages. She said she sustained multiple fractures and other injuries when she drove her car into a ditching machine, which she contended was left on the highway by the defendants, without the proper lights. It is not clear what the outcome was.

Christy married Robert Lee More Jr., and they lived on the Waggoner Ranch in Texas.

== Filmography ==
Year	Title	Role	Notes
1927	Long Pants	Bit Role	Uncredited
1927	No Sparking		
1927	The Kid Sister	Mary Hall	
1928	Speedy	Jane Dillon	
1928	The Water Hole	Dolores	
1929	Just Off Broadway	Nan Morgan	
1929	The Lariat Kid	Mary Lou	
1929	Lady of Lions	Judy	Alternative title: Sporting Youth (#1): Lady of Lions
1929	Hi-Jack and the Game	Judy	Alternative title: Sporting Youth (#2): Hi-Jack and the Game
1929	The Take-Off	Judy	Alternative title: Sporting Youth (#3): The Take-Off
1930	Steeplechase	Judy	Alternative title: Sporting Youth (#4): Steeplechase
1930	Live Ghosts	Judy	Alternative title: Sporting Youth (#5): Live Ghosts
1930	Footlight Follies	Judy	Alternative title: Sporting Youth (#6): Footlight Follies
1930	A Royal Four-Flush	Judy	Alternative title: Sporting Youth (#7): A Royal Four-Flush
1930	Arabian Daze	Judy	Alternative title: Sporting Youth (#8): Arabian Daze
1930	Seeing Stars	Judy	Alternative title: Sporting Youth (#9): Seeing Stars
1930	Chinese Blues	Judy	Alternative title: Sporting Youth (#10): Chinese Blues
1930	Halloween	Judy	Alternative title: Sporting Youth (#11): Halloween
1930	Schoolmates	Judy	Alternative title: Sporting Youth (#12): Schoolmates
1930	Goodbye Legs		
1930	Hello, Television		
1930	The Fourth Alarm	Helen Griffith	
1930	Divorced Sweethearts		
1931	Big Ears	Wheezer's mother	
1931	Hollywood Halfbacks		
1932	Dream House	Betty Brooks	Alternative title: Crooner's Holiday
1932	Behind Stone Walls	Peg Harper - Bob's Girlfriend	
