= Lorraine of the Timberlands =

1921 film

- Directed by: Robert North Bradbury
- Produced by: Cyrus J. Williams
- Starring: Tom Santschi; Ruth Stonehouse
- Distributed by: Pathé Exchange
- Release date: October 2, 1921 (U.S.)
- Running time: 2 reels
- Country: United States
- Language: Silent (English intertitles)

Lorraine of the Timberlands is a 1921 American short silent Western film melodrama film produced by Cyrus J. Williams and distributed by Pathé Exchange. It was directed by Robert North Bradbury and stars Tom Santschi and Ruth Stonehouse.

This short film was part of the "Santschi Series", which included the other short films The Honor of Rameriz, The Spirit of the Lake, The Heart of Doreon, and Mother o' Dreams, all of which starred Santschi.

== Plot ==
A man (Santschi) has lost his faith in God and seeks revenge for the loss of his wife and child. At one point, the villain has him jailed, but he escapes when a bolt of lightning strikes the jail. He is reunited with his daughter, who has since grown up.

== Cast ==
- Tom Santschi
- Ruth Stonehouse
- Andrew Waldron
- Clark Comstock
- Earl Hughes

== Reception ==
Santschi's performance received positive reviews, but the plot was deemed melodramatic.
