= The Devil's Cage =

1928 film

- Directed by: Wilfred Noy
- Written by: Isadore Bernstein
- Produced by: I.E. Chadwick
- Starring: Pauline Garon; Ruth Stonehouse; Donald Keith
- Cinematography: Ted Tetzlaff
- Edited by: Gene Milford
- Production company: Chadwick Pictures
- Distributed by: Chadwick Pictures
- Release date: June 5, 1928
- Running time: 60 minutes
- Country: United States
- Languages: Silent; English intertitles

The Devil's Cage is a 1928 American silent drama film directed by Wilfred Noy and starring Pauline Garon, Ruth Stonehouse and Donald Keith. It is also known by the alternative title of The Girl in the Rain.

== Cast ==
- Pauline Garon as Eloise
- Ruth Stonehouse as Marcel
- Donald Keith as Franklyn
- Armand Kaliz as Pierre
- Lincoln Stedman as Maurice

== Bibliography ==
- Munden, Kenneth White. The American Film Institute Catalog of Motion Pictures Produced in the United States, Part 1. University of California Press, 1997.
