= The Adventures of Bill and Bob =

1920 film

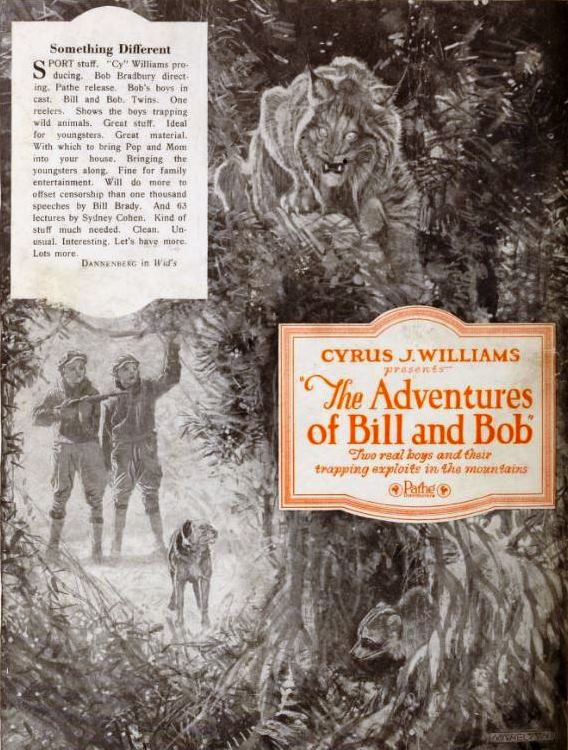
- Advertisement
- Directed by: Robert N. Bradbury
- Produced by: Cyrus J. Williams
- Release date: 1920
- Country: United States
- Language: Silent

The Adventures of Bill and Bob is an American series of 16 silent one-reelers directed by Robert N. Bradbury and starring his sons, Bob and Bill. It was the first film Steele (Bob Bradbury, Jr) starred in. The series was produced by Cyrus J. Williams.

== Premise ==
The Adventures of Bill and Bob was a series of 16 one-reelers from Pathé Exchange following twin boys, Bill and Bob, as they explore animal hunting and trapping efforts in the mountains. The individual titles included:

- The American Badger
- Capturing a Koala Bear
- Capturing the Canadian Lynx
- Civet Cat
- A Day in the wilds
- the fox
- The Mountain Lion
- Mysterious Tracks
- The Opossum
- Outwitting the Timber Wolf
- Secret Trails
- The Skunk
- Trailing the Coyote
- Trapping a Raccoon
- Trapping the Bobcat
- Trapping the Weasel

== Cast ==
- Bob Steele as Bob (credited as Bob Bradbury Jr.)
- Bill Bradbury as Bill
- Jeanne Carpenter

== Production ==
In 1920, Bradbury filmed and directed a number of two-reelers that he had made of his boys, Bill and Bob. After showing these to friends, it was suggested that he produce them as an adventure series for children. They were released as a series of 16 one-reelers titled The Adventures of Bill and Bob. The series was only moderately successful because screenings were designed for children and thus were often withdrawn from theaters and instead shown in Sunday school groups and in schools.

== Reception ==
The films included scenes of hunting and trapping animals, which met with some negative reviews. For example, the Massachusetts Society for the Prevention of Cruelty to Animals wrote: "We know of no moving picture that has aroused such indignant protest from humane people all over the country as the one entitled The Adventures of Bill and Bob or The Capture of the Bob-Cat. How it was ever permitted to pass ''any'' Board of Censors is a mystery." Coorespondence to The National Humane Review called it "cruel". Life wrote that while the films were "occasionally interesting", they included "a great many instanced of cruelty to animals, they can scarcely be recommended".

Not all reception was negative, however. The Canadian Motion Pictures Digest wrote of the episode Outwitting the Timber Wolf that "[like] previous offerings of these short subject features, this one abounds not only in thrills, but also beautiful natural outdoor scenery, and amusing instances as well". They further called it "great stuff, ideal for youngsters". The Musical Courier and Review praised the musical score's choice of Victor Herbert's Little Nemo for the overture, and further noted that the pictures were "a delight to boys and others of us who long for days in the woods.
