= Making the Varsity =

1928 film directed by Cliff Wheeler

- Directed by: Cliff Wheeler
- Written by: Elsie Werner; Bennett Southard; De Leon Anthony
- Produced by: Samuel Zierler
- Starring: Rex Lease; Arthur Rankin; Gladys Hulette
- Cinematography: Edward A. Kull
- Production company: Excellent Pictures
- Distributed by: Excellent Pictures
- Release date: July 15, 1928
- Running time: 60 minutes
- Country: United States
- Languages: Silent; English intertitles

Making the Varsity is a 1928 American silent drama film directed by Cliff Wheeler and starring Rex Lease, Arthur Rankin, and Gladys Hulette.

== Cast ==
- Rex Lease as Ed Ellsworth
- Arthur Rankin as Wall Ellsworth
- Gladys Hulette as Estelle Carter
- Edith Murgatroyd as Mrs. Ellsworth
- Florence Dudley as Gladys Fogarty
- Carl Miller as Jerry Fogarty
- James Latta as Gridley

== Bibliography ==
- Munden, Kenneth White. The American Film Institute Catalog of Motion Pictures Produced in the United States, Part 1. University of California Press, 1997.
