= The Adventurous Soul =

1927 film directed by Gene Carroll

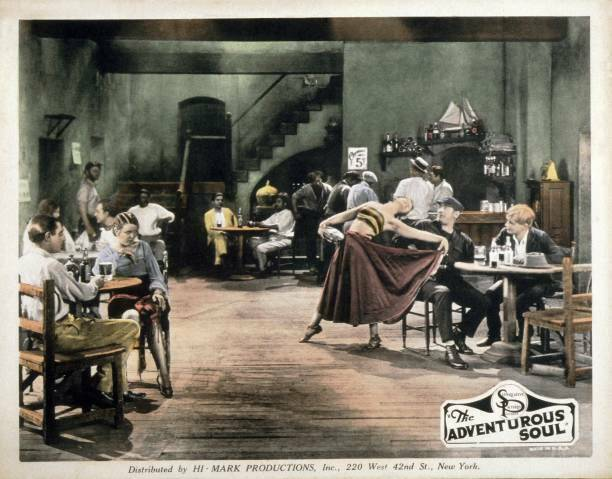
- Directed by: Gene Carroll
- Written by: John J. Moreno
- Produced by: Harriet Virginia
- Starring: Mildred Harris; Tom Santschi; Charles K. French
- Cinematography: Jerry Fairbanks
- Production company: Hi-Mark Productions
- Distributed by: Hi-Mark Productions; Woolf & Freedman Film Service (UK)
- Release date: November 29, 1927
- Running time: 59 minutes
- Country: United States
- Languages: Silent; English intertitles

The Adventurous Soul is a 1927 American silent drama film directed by Gene Carroll and starring Mildred Harris, Tom Santschi and Charles K. French. A print of the film exists in the Library of Congress film archive.

== Synopsis ==
The owner of a shipping line arranges to have his waster son shanghaied on one of his vessels commanded by the tough Captain Svenson. But the son discovers in time and gives them the slip. Instead a clerk working for the company Dick Marlow, engaged to his sister Miriam, is taken instead.

== Cast ==
- Mildred Harris as Miriam Martin
- Jimmy Fulton as Dick Barlow
- Tom Santschi as Captain Svenson
- Arthur Rankin as Glenn Martin
- Charles K. French as John Martin

== Bibliography ==
- Connelly, Robert B. The Silents: Silent Feature Films, 1910-36, Volume 40, Issue 2. December Press, 1998.
- Munden, Kenneth White. The American Film Institute Catalog of Motion Pictures Produced in the United States, Part 1. University of California Press, 1997.
