= The Honor of Rameriz =

1921 film by Robert North Bradbury

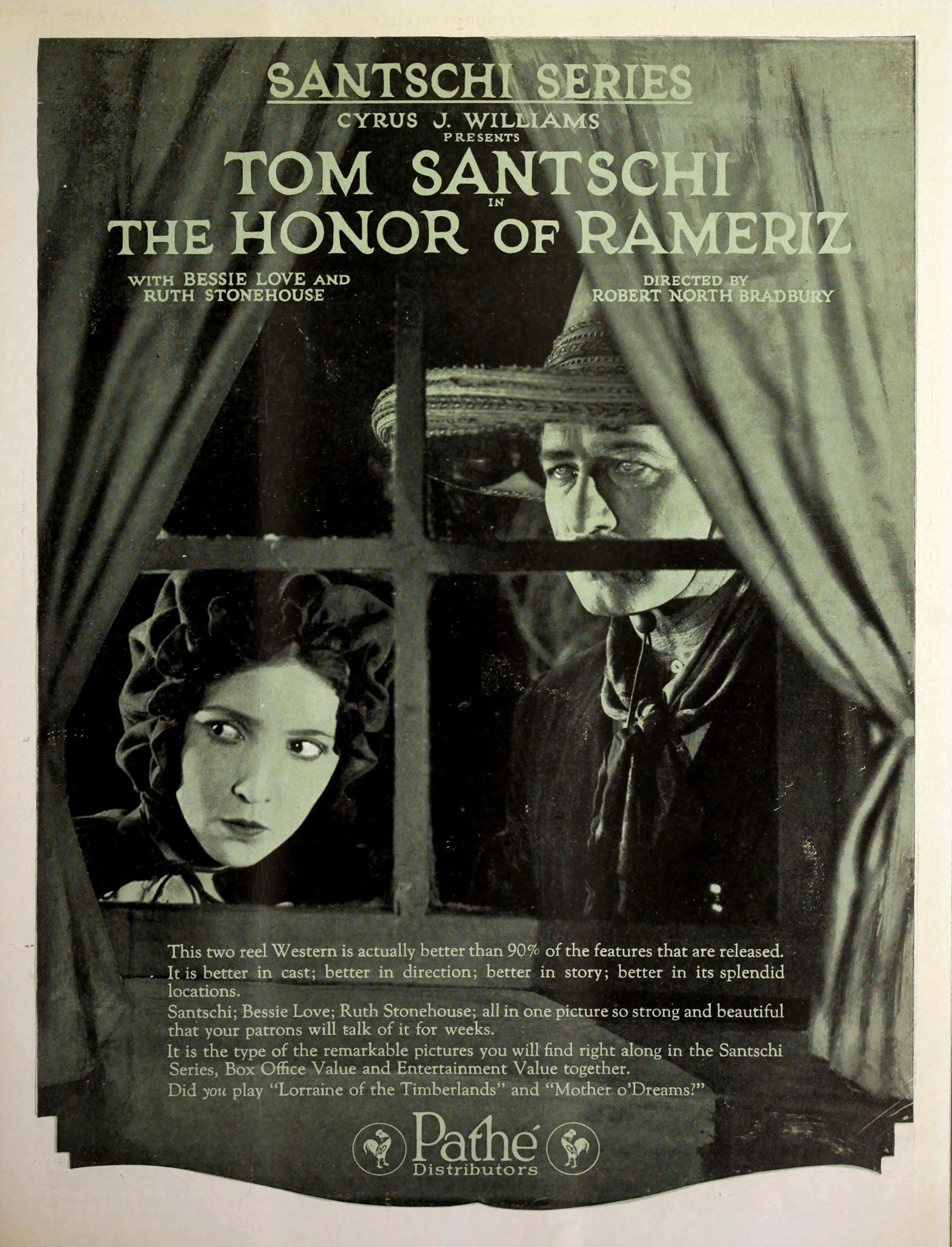
- Directed by: Robert North Bradbury
- Produced by: Cyrus J. Williams
- Starring: Tom Santschi; Bessie Love; Ruth Stonehouse
- Distributed by: Pathé Exchange
- Release date: October 16, 1921 (U.S.)
- Running time: 2 reels
- Country: United States
- Language: Silent (English intertitles)

The Honor of Rameriz (often incorrectly referred to with the correct spelling of 'Ramirez': The Honor of Ramirez) is a 1921 American short silent Western film produced by Cyrus J. Williams and distributed by Pathé Exchange. It was directed by Robert North Bradbury and stars Tom Santschi, Bessie Love, and Ruth Stonehouse.

This short film was part of the "Santschi Series", which included the other short films The Spirit of the Lake, The Heart of Doreon, Lorraine of the Timberlands, and Mother o' Dreams, all of which starred Santschi.

The film is presumed lost.

== Plot ==
Near the Mexico–United States border, when a woman's gold is stolen by a thief, the woman seeks help from Rameriz. Rameriz's jealous wife and the woman's geologist husband assume that the woman and Rameriz are having an affair. In the end, the gold is returned, and the honor of Rameriz is restored.

== Cast ==
- Tom Santschi as Rameriz
- Bessie Love as the geologist's wife
- Ruth Stonehouse as the wife of Rameriz
- Eddie Hearn as the thief
- Thomas Lingham
- Jay Morley as the geologist

== Production ==
Some outdoor scenes were filmed at Keen's Camp in Riverside County.
