= A Bit of Heaven =

1928 film directed by Cliff Wheeler

- Directed by: Cliff Wheeler
- Written by: Roland Kingston; Elsie Werner; Harry Chandlee
- Produced by: Samuel Zierler; Burton L. King
- Starring: Bryant Washburn; Lila Lee; Otto Lederer
- Cinematography: Walter Haas; Edward Snyder
- Production company: Excellent Pictures
- Distributed by: Excellent Pictures
- Release date: May 15, 1928
- Running time: 70 minutes
- Country: United States
- Languages: Silent film English intertitles
- Budget: $60,000

A Bit of Heaven is a 1928 American silent drama film directed by Cliff Wheeler and starring Bryant Washburn, Lila Lee, and Otto Lederer.

== Plot ==
A young man from a wealthy background marries a dancer in a Broadway revue, to the dismay of his aunt, who had plans for him to marry a woman of his own class. They conspire to make it seem as if his wife has been unfaithful, and he leaves for Paris to seek a divorce.

== Cast ==
- Bryant Washburn as Roger Van Dorn
- Lila Lee as Fola Dale
- Otto Lederer as Sam Maltman
- Richard Tucker as Mark Storm
- Martha Mattox as Aunt Honoria
- Lucy Beaumont as Aunt Priscilla
- Jacqueline Gadsdon as Helen Worl
- Sybil Grove as Maid
- Edwin Argus as Comedian

== Bibliography ==
- Munden, Kenneth White. The American Film Institute Catalog of Motion Pictures Produced in the United States, Part 1. University of California Press, 1997.
