= Lucy Beaumont (actress) =

English actress (1869–1937)

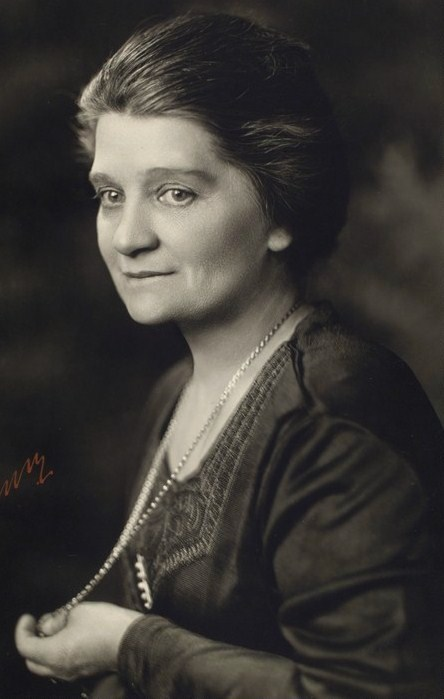
- Beaumont, c. 1930
- Born: Lucy Emily Pinkstone; 18 May 1869; Bristol, England
- Died: 24 April 1937 (aged 67); New York City, U.S.
- Occupation: Actress
- Years active: 1919–1937
- Spouses: Captain Arthur Douglas Vigors Harris (1899-his death); William Alfred Beaumont (1889-1898)

Lucy Emily Beaumont (née Pinkstone, later Harris; 18 May 1869 – 24 April 1937) was an English actress of the stage and screen from Bristol.

== Biography ==
On Broadway, Beaumont played Lady Emily Lyons in The Bishop Misbehaves (1935) and Mrs. Barwick in Berkeley Square (1929). A 1932 revival of Berkeley Square, featuring Beaumont, Miriam Seegar, and Henry Mowbray, was staged in San Francisco by Arthur Greville Collins.

During the 1914–15 season Beaumont was in My Lady's Dress at the Playhouse in New York. The following season she was featured in Quinneys, for part of the play's run. In 1916 she appeared with Frances Starr in Little Lady in Blue.

Beaumont played mostly mother parts on the screen. Some of her films are The Greater Glory (1926), with Conway Tearle, The Man Without A Country (1925), with Pauline Starke, Torrent (1926), with Ricardo Cortez, The Beloved Rogue, with John Barrymore, Resurrection (1927), with Dolores del Río, The Crowd (1928), with Eleanor Boardman and Maid of Salem (1937), her final motion picture, with Claudette Colbert. Her final professional appearance was in April 1937 on the Robert L. Ripley radio programme. Her films spanned a variety of genres.

== Personal life ==
First married to William Alfred Beaumont from 1889 to 1898, she married secondly to Captain Arthur Douglas Vigors Harris in 1899. Her second marriage ended with her husband's death. She had no children.

Lucy Beaumont died in 1937 at the Royalton Hotel in New York City. She had lived in the United States for 20 years before her death.

== Partial filmography ==
- Sandy Burke of the U-Bar-U (1919) - Widow Mackey
- Ashes of Vengeance (1923) - Charlotte
- Lucretia Lombard (1923) - Mrs. Winship
- Enemies of Children (1923)
- Cupid's Fireman (1923) - Mother
- The Last of the Duanes (1924) - Bland's Wife
- The Family Secret (1924) - Miss Abigail Selfridge
- The Trouble with Wives (1925) - Grace's Mother
- Torrent (1926) - Doña Pepa
- The Greater Glory (1926) - Tante Ilde
- Along Came Auntie (1926, Short) - Aunt Alvira
- Men of the Night (1926) - Mrs. Abbott
- The Old Soak (1926) - Mrs. Hawley
- The Beloved Rogue (1927) - Villon's Mother
- Resurrection (1927) - Aunt Sophya
- Closed Gates (1927) - Mary Newell
- Stranded (1927) - Grandmother
- The Thirteenth Hour (1927) - Woman strangled at mansion (uncredited)
- Outcast Souls (1928) - Mrs. Mary Davis
- Comrades (1928) - Mrs. Dixon
- The Crowd (1928) - Mother
- The Little Yellow House (1928) - Mrs. Milburn
- A Bit of Heaven (1928) - Aunt Priscilla
- The Branded Man (1928) - The Mother
- Stool Pigeon (1928) - Mrs. Wells
- The Greyhound Limited (1929) - Mrs. Williams - Bill's Mother
- Sonny Boy (1929) - Mother Thorpe
- Hardboiled Rose (1929) - Grandmama Duhamel
- One Splendid Hour (1929) - Mother Kelly
- The Ridin' Demon (1929) - Mrs. Riordan
- The Girl in the Show (1929) - Lorna Montrose
- Scarlet Pages (1930) - Martha, Mary's housekeeper(uncredited)
- A Free Soul (1931) - Grandma Ashe
- Caught Plastered (1931) - Mother Talley
- New Adventures of Get Rich Quick Wallingford (1931) - Mrs. Dalrymple, the cleaning lady (uncredited)
- Three Wise Girls (1932) - Mrs. Barnes, Cassie's Mother
- Cheaters at Play (1932)
- Disorderly Conduct (1932) - Mrs. Fay (uncredited)
- State's Attorney (1932) - Member of the Jury (uncredited)
- The Midnight Lady (1932) - Grandma Austin
- Is My Face Red? (1932) - Geraldine Tucker (uncredited)
- Movie Crazy (1932) - Mrs. Hall
- Thrill of Youth (1932) - Grandma Thayer
- His Double Life (1933) - Mrs. Leek
- Blind Justice (1934) - Mrs. Summers
- Temptation (1934) - Headmistress
- Condemned to Live (1935) - Mother Molly
- False Pretenses (1935) - Miss Milgrim
- The Devil-Doll (1936) - Mme. Lavond
- Maid of Salem (1937) - Rebecca, Nurse

== Sources ==
- Lima Daily News, "Along Broadway", 3 October 1917, pg 3.
- The New York Times, Lucy Beaumont Dies; Actress Many Years, 25 April 1937, pg. 42
