= Outcast Souls =

1928 film

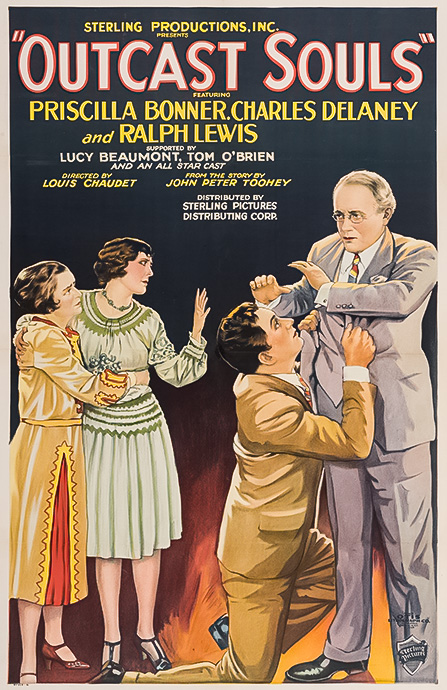
- Directed by: Louis Chaudet
- Written by: John Peter Toohey (story); Norman Houston; Jean Plannette; H. Tipton Steck
- Produced by: Joe Rock
- Starring: Priscilla Bonner; Charles Delaney; Ralph Lewis
- Cinematography: Herbert Kirkpatrick
- Edited by: H. Tipton Steck
- Music by: Michael Hoffman
- Production company: Sterling Pictures
- Distributed by: Sterling Pictures
- Release date: January 24, 1928
- Running time: 6 reels
- Country: United States
- Languages: Silent; English intertitles

Outcast Souls is a 1928 American silent drama film directed by Louis Chaudet and starring Priscilla Bonner, Charles Delaney and Ralph Lewis.

== Cast ==
- Priscilla Bonner as Alice Davis
- Charles Delaney as Charles Turner
- Ralph Lewis as John Turner
- Lucy Beaumont as Mrs. Mary Davis
- Tom O'Brien as Officer

== Bibliography ==
- Munden, Kenneth White. The American Film Institute Catalog of Motion Pictures Produced in the United States, Part 1. University of California Press, 1997.
