= The Heart of Doreon =

1921 film

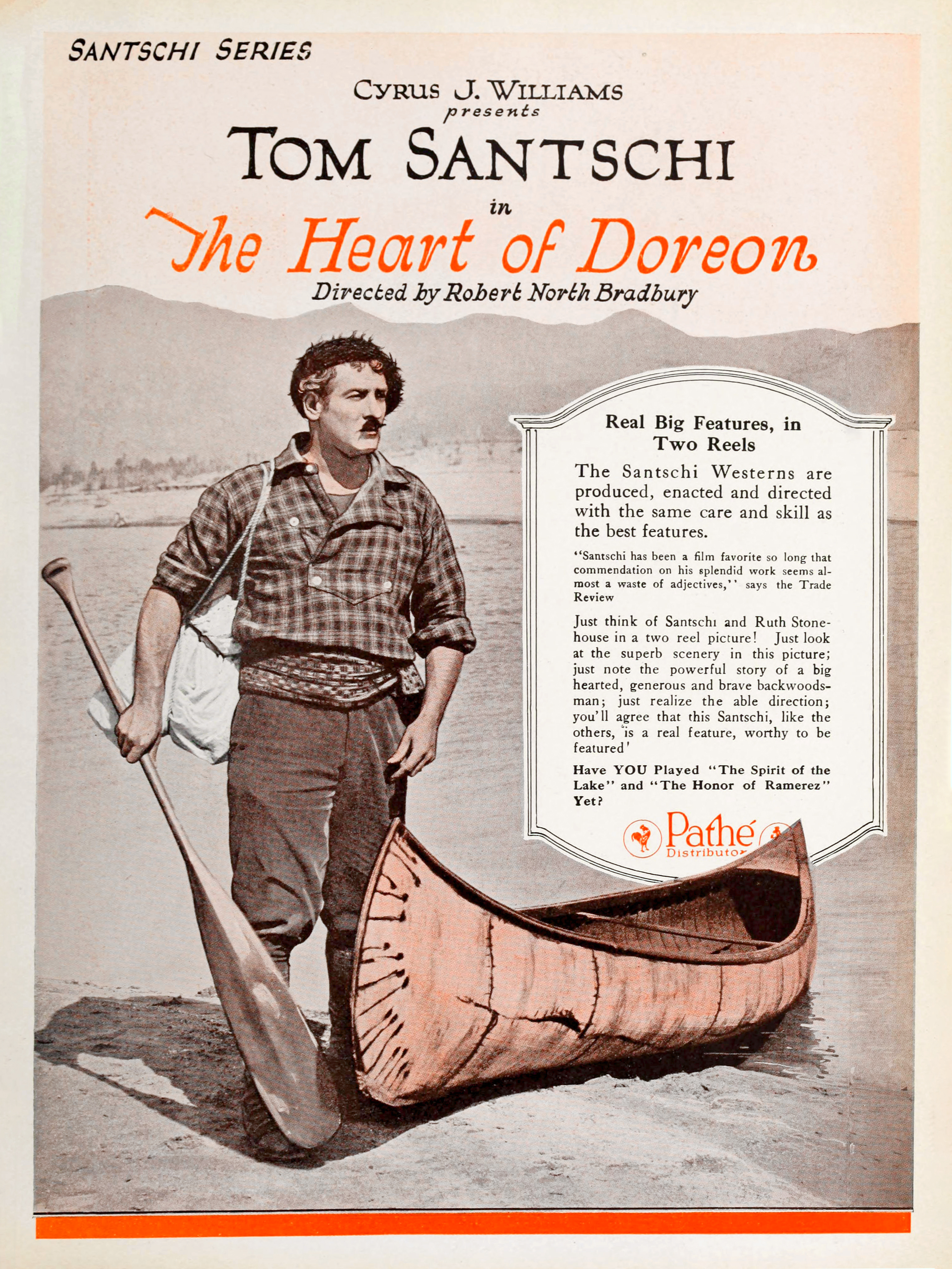
- Magazine advertisement
- Directed by: Robert North Bradbury
- Based on: Hard to Catch (story) by Robert Walker
- Produced by: Cyrus J. Williams
- Starring: Tom Santschi; Ruth Stonehouse
- Distributed by: Pathé Exchange
- Release date: November 13, 1921 (U.S.)
- Running time: 2 reels
- Country: United States
- Language: Silent (English intertitles)

The Heart of Doreon (also known as In the Heart of Doreon and misspelled as The Heart of Dorean) is a 1921 American silent short Western romantic drama film produced by Cyrus J. Williams and distributed by Pathé Exchange. It was directed by Robert North Bradbury and stars Tom Santschi and Ruth Stonehouse.

This short film was part of the "Santschi Series", which included the other short films The Honor of Rameriz, The Spirit of the Lake, Lorraine of the Timberlands, and Mother o' Dreams, all of which starred Santschi.

An 8-minute version of the film survives, which has been released by Harpodeon.

== Plot ==
French Canadian woodsman Doreon (Santschi) is in love with Babette (Stonehouse), but she is in love with Blake (Hearn). After a fight, Doreon mistakenly believes that he has killed Blake. He later learns that Blake has survived but is wanted for murder. Doreon helps the Royal Canadian Mounted Police capture Blake, and Babette falls in love with Doreon.

== Cast ==
- Tom Santschi as Doreon
- Ruth Stonehouse as Babette
- Edward Hearn as Blake
- Jay Morley

== Production ==
Exteriors were filmed in the San Jacinto Mountains.

== Reception ==
The film was noted for its "beautiful outdoor scenes."
