= Jean Plannette =

American screenwriter

- Born: Rhodora Plannette; February 9, 1905; Battle Creek, Michigan, USA
- Died: November 27, 1966 (aged 61); Los Angeles, California, USA
- Occupation(s): Screenwriter, author
- Spouse: Edward L. Cox

Jean Plannette (1905-1966) was an American screenwriter and writer active during the 1920s and 1930s. She was briefly married to RKO technician Edward L. Cox; the pair had a daughter, Elizabeth, before divorcing.

== Selected filmography ==
- The Little Maestro (1937)
- Bars and Stripes (1937)
- Annie Laurie (1936)
- Whispering Winds (1929)
- Comrades (1928)
- Outcast Souls (1928)
- Polly of the Movies (1927)
- Ragtime (1927)
