= Comrades (1928 film) =

1928 film directed by Cliff Wheeler

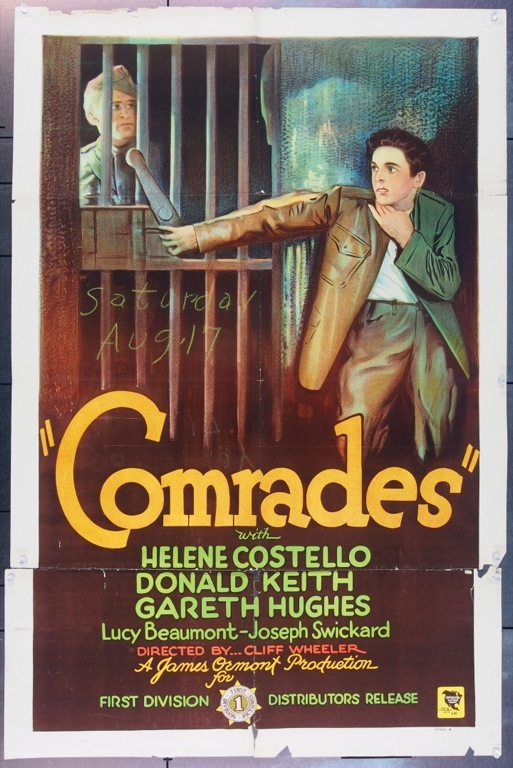
- Theatrical release poster
- Directed by: Cliff Wheeler
- Written by: Jean Plannette; Ruth Todd
- Story by: Billy Gilbert
- Produced by: James Ormont
- Starring: Donald Keith; Helene Costello; Gareth Hughes
- Cinematography: Ted Tetzlaff
- Edited by: Gene Milford
- Production company: James Ormont Productions
- Distributed by: First Division Pictures
- Release date: February 10, 1928
- Running time: 60 minutes
- Country: United States
- Language: Silent (English intertitles)

Comrades is a 1928 American silent drama film directed by Cliff Wheeler and starring Donald Keith, Helene Costello, and Gareth Hughes.

== Cast ==
- Donald Keith as Perry O'Toole
- Helene Costello as Helen Dixon
- Gareth Hughes as Bob Dixon
- Lucy Beaumont as Mrs. Dixon
- Josef Swickard as John Burton
- James Lloyd as Tommy

== Bibliography ==
- Donald W. McCaffrey & Christopher P. Jacobs. Guide to the Silent Years of American Cinema. Greenwood Publishing, 1999. ISBN 0-313-30345-2
