= Free to Love =

1925 film

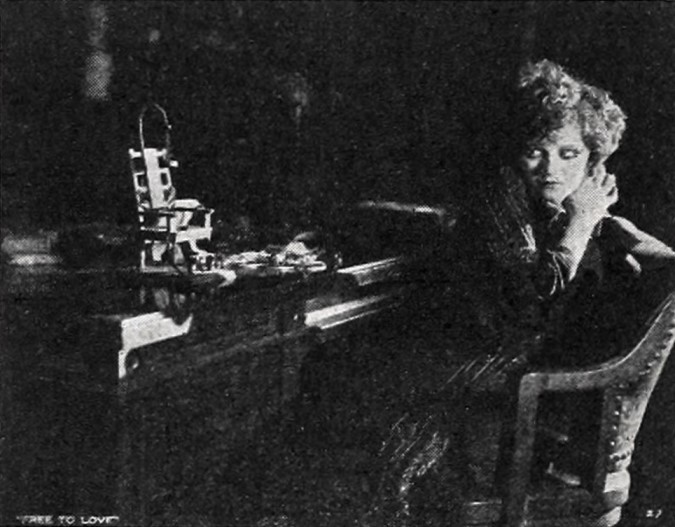
- Still with Bow
- Directed by: Frank O'Connor
- Screenplay by: Adele Buffington
- Produced by: B. P. Schulberg
- Starring: Clara Bow; Donald Keith
- Production company: B.P. Schulberg Productions
- Distributed by: Preferred Pictures
- Release date: November 20, 1925
- Running time: 60 minutes
- Country: United States
- Language: Silent (English intertitles)

Free to Love is a 1925 American silent drama film directed by Frank O'Connor. The film stars Clara Bow and Donald Keith.

== Plot ==
After threatening him with a gun but relenting, Marie Anthony, who was recently released from a reformatory, is adopted by Judge Orr and becomes the fiancée of the young minister James Crawford, who intends to assist former convicts. Gang leader Jack Garner, who threatens to disclose what he knows of her past, succeeds in temporarily separating the lovers. Tony, a hunchback that Marie has befriended, warns her that Crawford's father is a confederate of criminals. Trying to shield the latter, Marie is arrested and accused of murder when Tony kills Garner, but is released when Tony later confesses. The senior Crawford commits suicide. Marie and her lover are reunited.

== Cast ==
- Clara Bow as Marie Anthony
- Donald Keith as Rev. James Crawford
- Raymond McKee as Tony
- Hallam Cooley as Jack Garner
- Winter Hall as Judge Orr
- Charles Hill Mailes as Kenton Crawford
- Joan Meredith (undetermined)

== Preservation ==
As well as being available on DVD, a copy of Free to Love is held at UCLA Film and Television Archive.

== Analysis ==
In a 2008 essay, Russel Johnson analysed the film "to illuminate the history of eugenics in the United States". The title of the film was said to figure among those that "are themselves an explanation of Clara Bow's persona and career" as was the scene where the character she plays "descended a gigantic staircase, leading six tuxedoed men by a leash."
