= The Shadow on the Wall (1925 film) =

1925 film

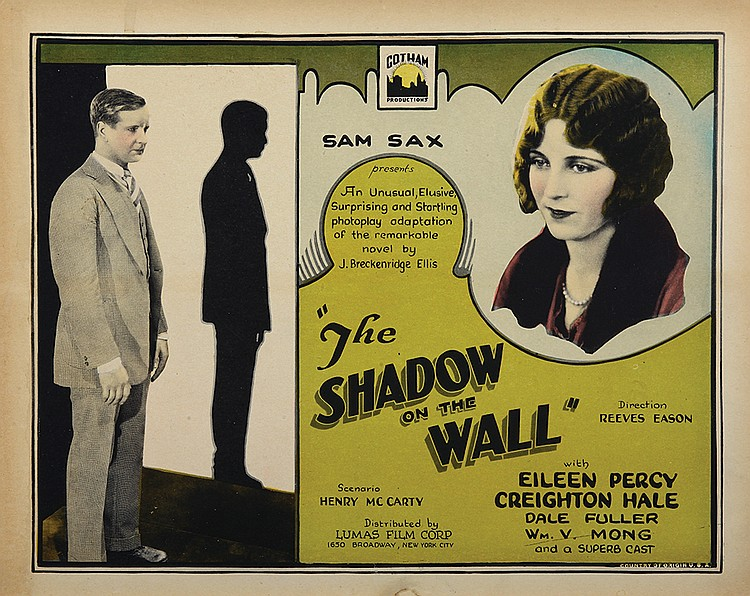
- Lobby card
- Directed by: B. Reeves Eason
- Written by: Henry McCarty; Elsie Werner
- Based on: The Picture on the Wall; 1920 novel by J. Breckenridge Ellis
- Produced by: Samuel Sax
- Starring: Eileen Percy; Creighton Hale; William V. Mong
- Cinematography: Ray June
- Production company: Gotham Productions
- Distributed by: Lumas Film Corporation
- Release date: November 1925
- Running time: 60 minutes
- Country: United States
- Language: Silent (English intertitles)

The Shadow on the Wall is a 1925 American silent mystery film directed by B. Reeves Eason and starring Eileen Percy, Creighton Hale, and William V. Mong.

== Plot ==
As described in a film magazine review, George Walters is a youth who is dominated by Bleary, a heartless bully, who forces him to pose as the son of millionaire George Warring, kidnapped as a baby. The missing son had a twin brother who had recently died, but a painting of the shadow of the late son is on one wall. Walters' shadow matches this painting perfectly, establishing him as the missing son to the Warring family. Walters falls in love with Warring's daughter Lucia and finds that the family attorney Glaxton is slowly poisoning the old man. Then the underworld bully makes a deal with the lawyer so that they can share the millions. Walters is able, with some assistance from Bleary's wife Missus, to bring the two scoundrels to justice. In the end it is discovered that Walters is the missing son, and Lucia is an adopted daughter, making the love finish secure.

== Cast ==
- Eileen Percy as Lucia Warring
- Creighton Hale as George Walters
- William V. Mong as Robert Glaxton
- Dale Fuller as The Missus
- Jack Curtis as Bleary
- Hardee Kirkland as Hode
- Willis Marks as George Warring

== Preservation ==
A print of The Shadow on the Wall is located in the Library of Congress.

== Bibliography ==
- Munden, Kenneth White. The American Film Institute Catalog of Motion Pictures Produced in the United States, Part 1. University of California Press, 1997.
