= Top Sergeant Mulligan (1928 film) =

1928 film

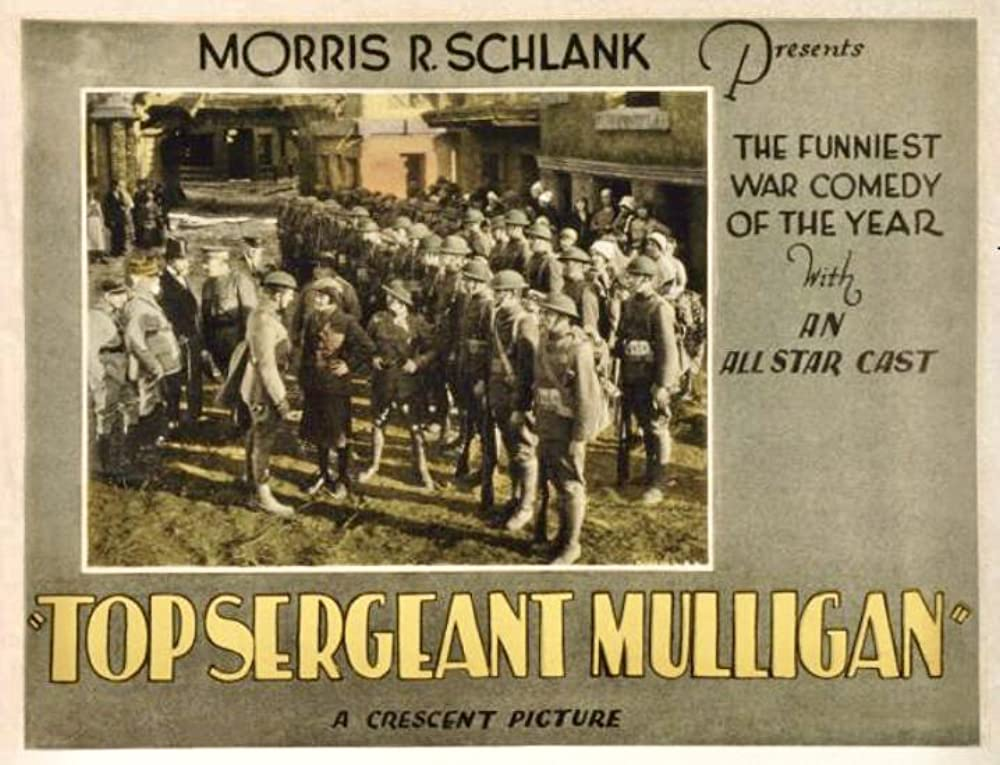
- Directed by: James P. Hogan
- Written by: De Leon Anthony; Frank Fenton
- Produced by: Morris R. Schlank
- Starring: Donald Keith; Lila Lee; Wesley Barry
- Cinematography: Robert E. Cline
- Edited by: De Leon Anthony
- Production company: Morris R. Schlank Productions
- Distributed by: Anchor Film Distributors
- Release date: January 15, 1928
- Running time: 60 minutes
- Country: United States
- Languages: Silent; English intertitles

Top Sergeant Mulligan is a 1928 American silent comedy film directed by James P. Hogan and starring Donald Keith, Lila Lee and Wesley Barry.

== Synopsis ==
During World War I a vaudevillian Mickey Neilan enlists in the army and encounters the domineering Sergeant Mulligan, who is a love rival for Neilan's former stage partner. In France Mickey is captured while searching for a Germany spy and is taken to Berlin.

== Cast ==
- Donald Keith as Osborne Wellington Pratt
- Lila Lee as The Girl
- Wesley Barry as Mickey Neilan
- Gareth Hughes as Lt. Fritz von Lang
- Wheeler Oakman as The captain
- Wade Boteler as Top Sgt. Mulligan
- Sheldon Lewis as The Spy

== Bibliography ==
- Connelly, Robert B. The Silents: Silent Feature Films, 1910-36, Volume 40, Issue 2. December Press, 1998.
- Munden, Kenneth White. The American Film Institute Catalog of Motion Pictures Produced in the United States, Part 1. University of California Press, 1997.
