= Cliff Wheeler =

American film director

- Born: May 27, 1894; Springfield, Massachusetts, United States
- Died: July 26, 1979 (aged 85); Los Angeles, California, United States
- Occupation: Director
- Years active: 1928-1930 (film)

Cliff Wheeler (1894–1979) was an American film director of the silent era.

== Selected filmography ==
- A Bit of Heaven (1928)
- Comrades (1928)
- Into No Man's Land (1928)
- Making the Varsity (1928)
- One Splendid Hour (1929)

== Bibliography ==
- Munden, Kenneth White. The American Film Institute Catalog of Motion Pictures Produced in the United States, Part 1. University of California Press, 1997.
