= Tom Santschi =

American actor (1880–1931)

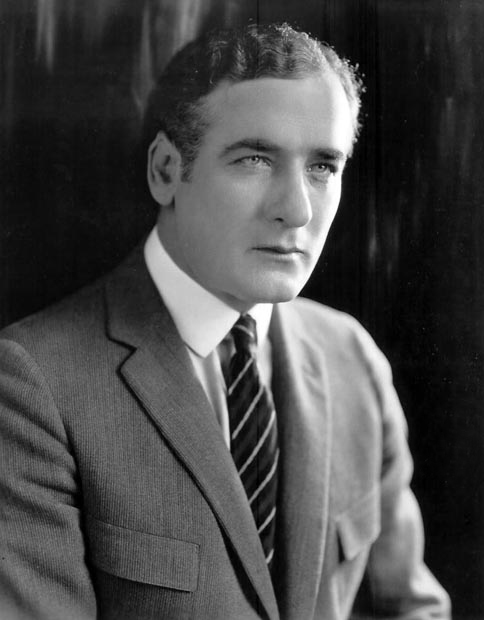
- Santschi c. 1920
- Born: Paul William Santschi; October 24, 1880; Crystal City, Missouri, U.S.
- Died: April 9, 1931 (aged 50); Los Angeles, California, U.S.
- Occupations: Actor, director
- Years active: 1907–1931

Paul William "Tom" Santschi (October 24, 1880 – April 9, 1931) was an American leading man and character actor of the silent film era.

== Personal life ==
Santschi was born in Missouri to Paul Santschi, a Swiss immigrant, and Margaret Kern, a native of Louisville, Kentucky. The family later moved to Kokomo, Indiana. Paul left home to pursue a career in moviemaking (as Tom Santschi), and at the time he registered for the draft in 1918, he was working for the Goldwyn Motion Picture Corporation in Fort Lee, New Jersey.

== Career ==
Santschi acted in over 245 films during the period 1907–1931, and directed 28 films during 1914–1916. He wrote one screenplay in 1914. A 1915 two-reeler, In the King's Service, in which he starred with Marion Warner, surfaced at a yard sale in Maine, and was shown along with The Spoilers (1914) at a Northeast Historic Film Festival at Bucksport, Maine in 2002.

== Partial filmography ==
=== Actor ===
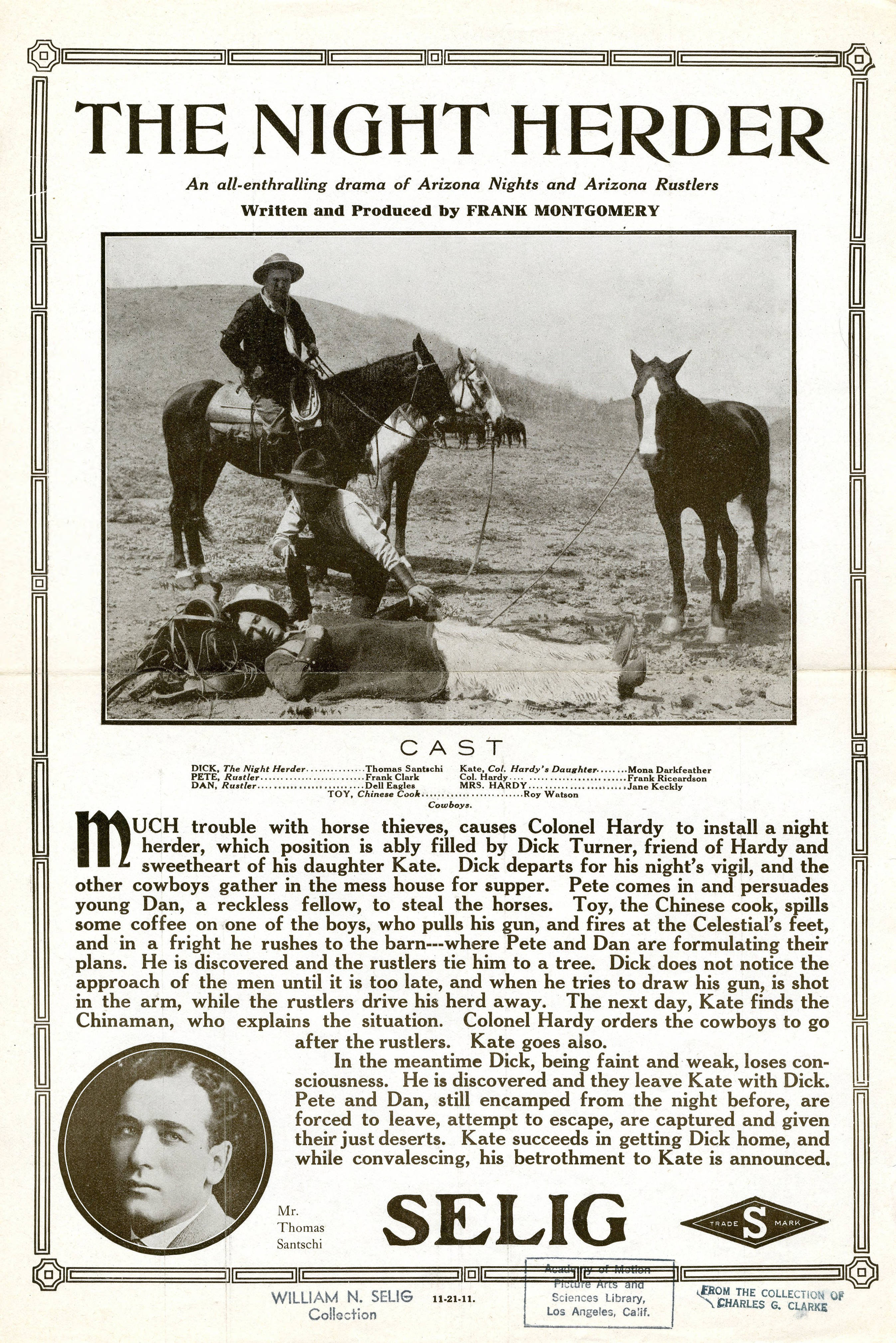
Flier for The Night Herder (1911)

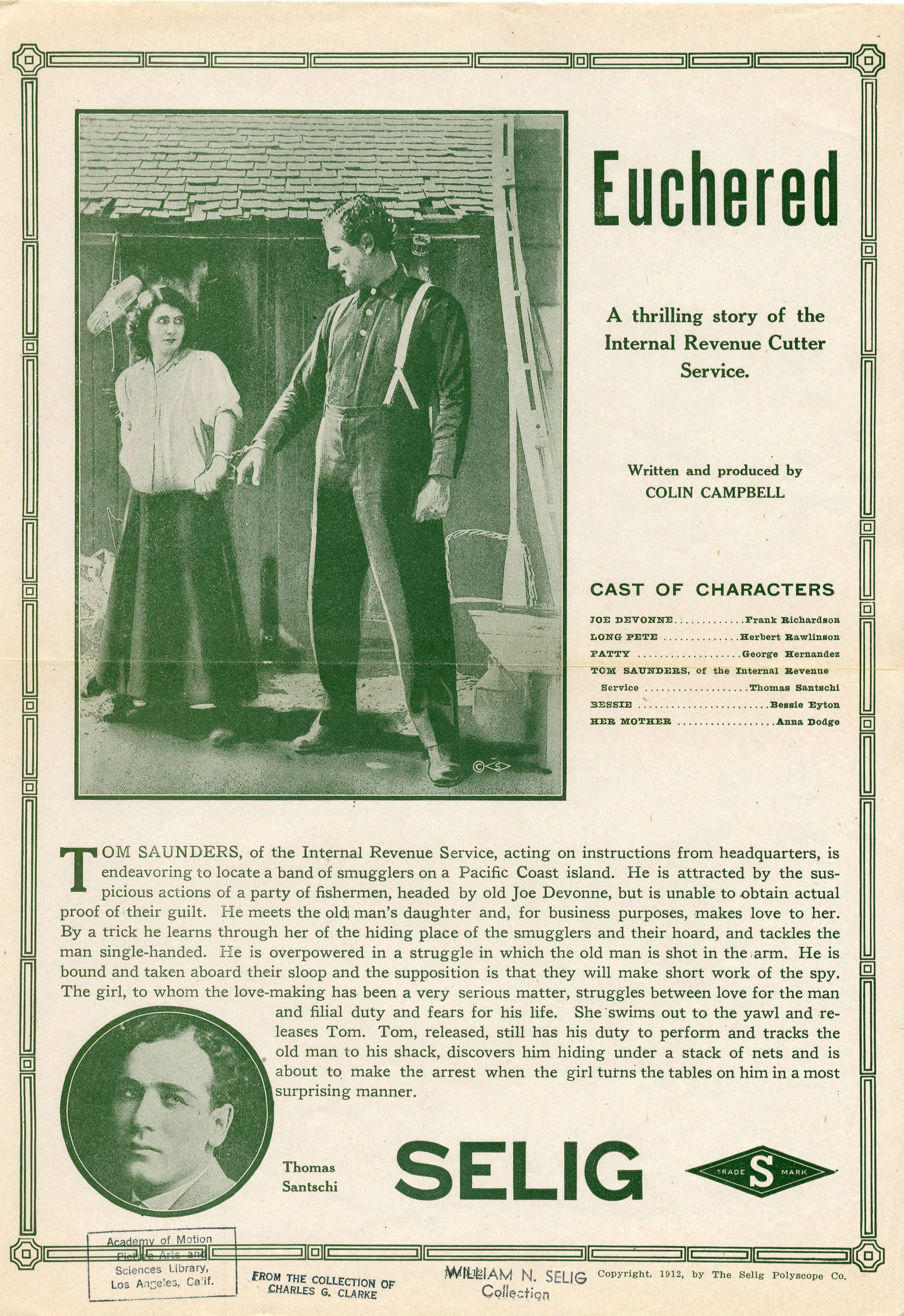
Flier for Euchered (1912)

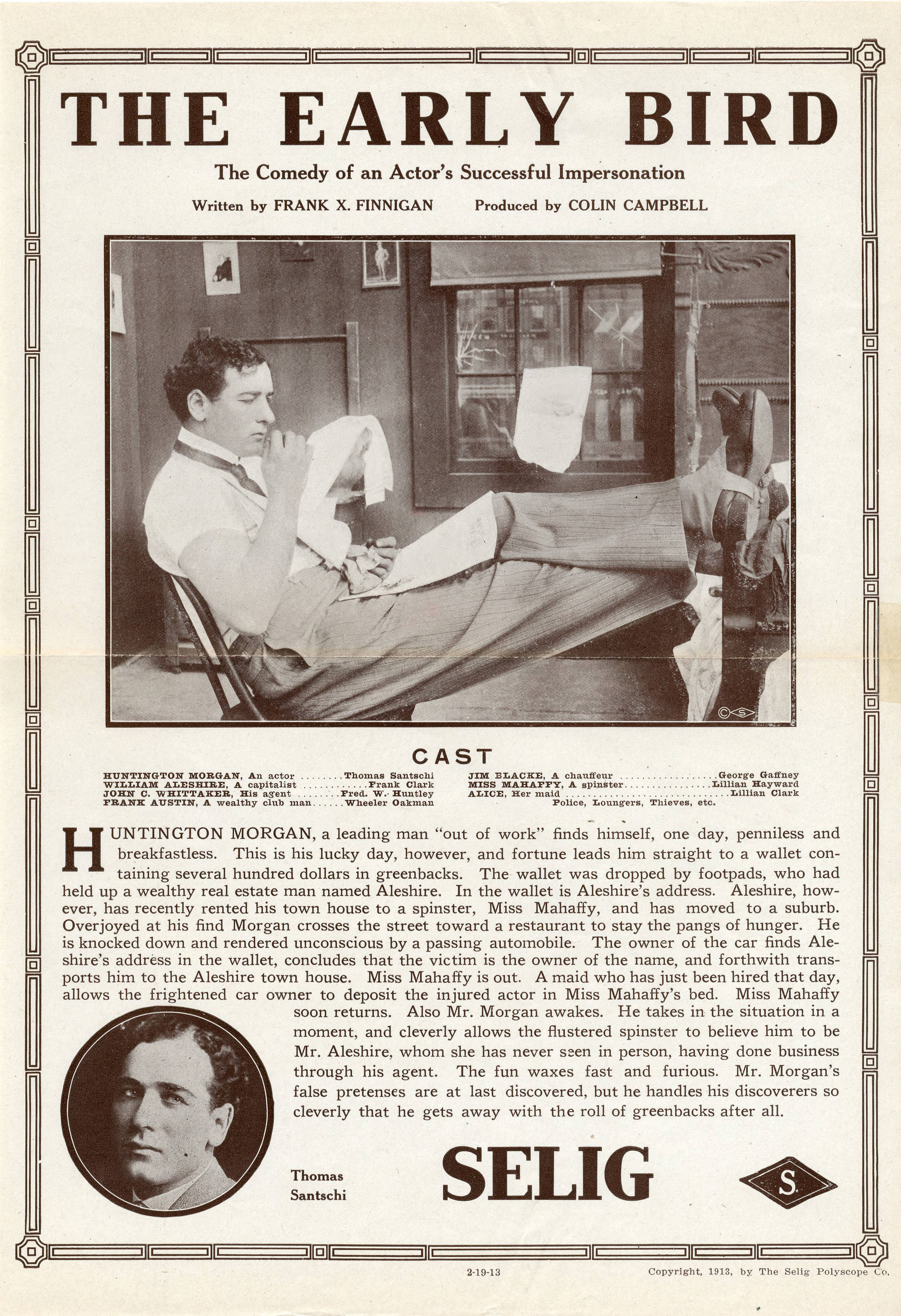
Flier for The Early Bird (1912)

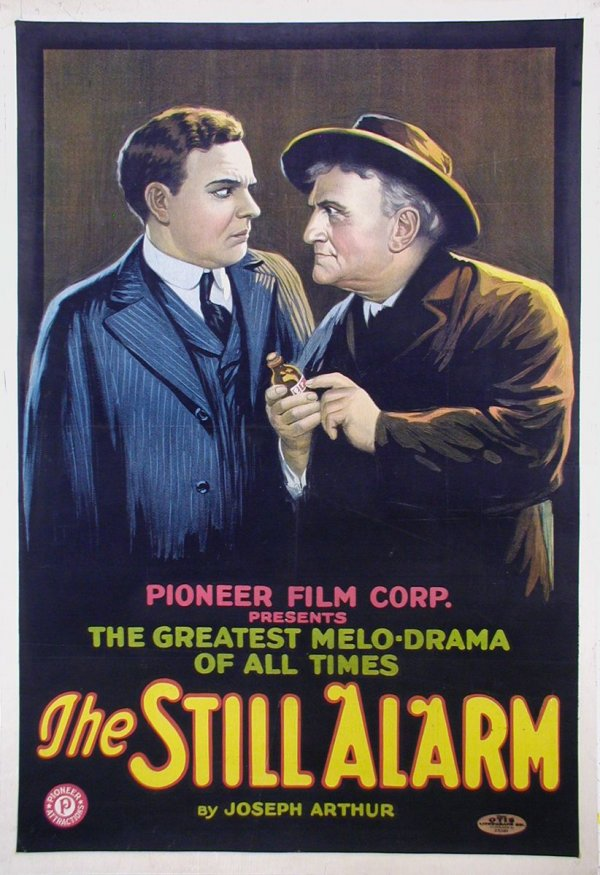
Poster for The Still Alarm (1918)

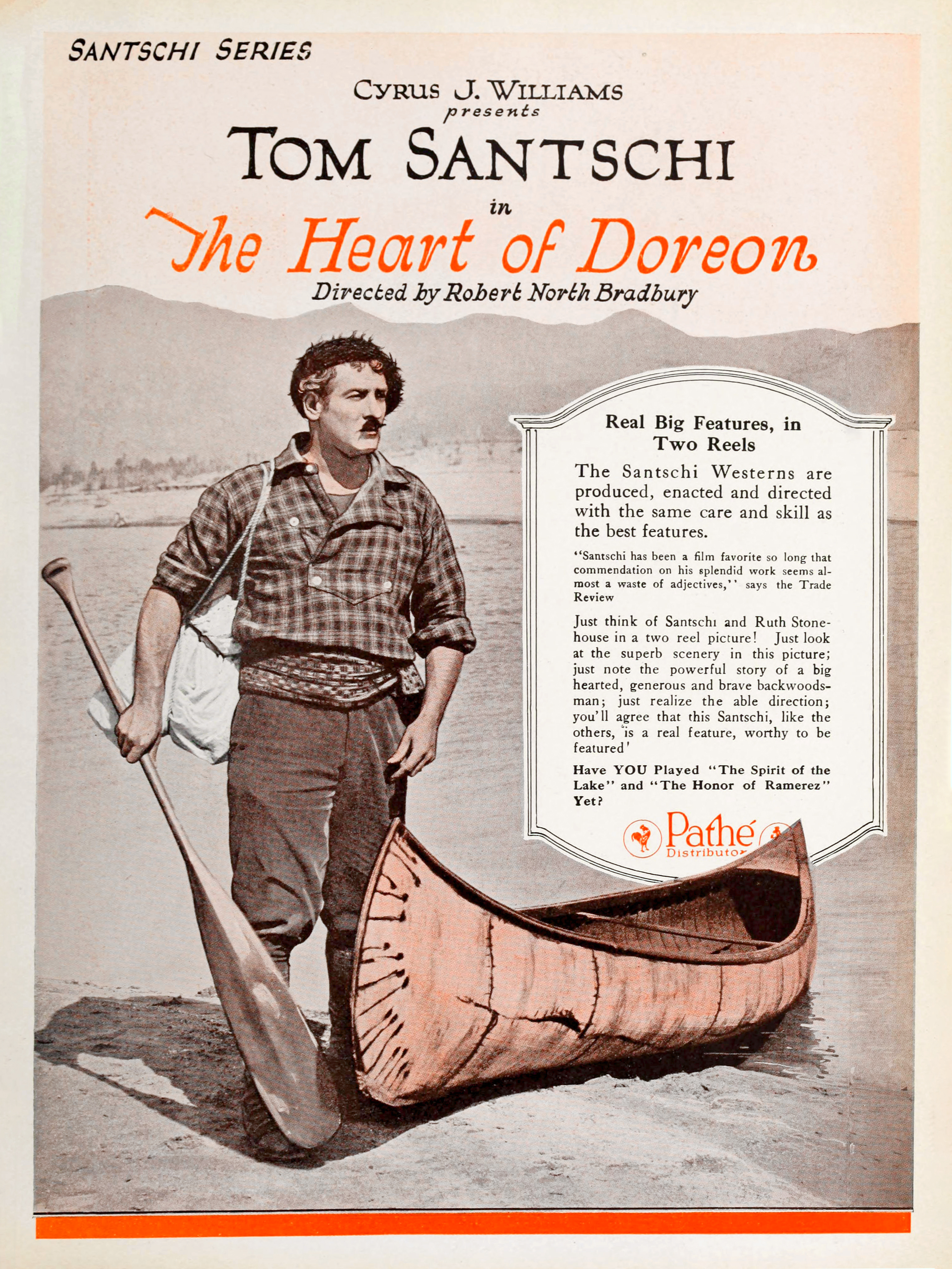
Advertisement for The Heart of Doreon (1921)

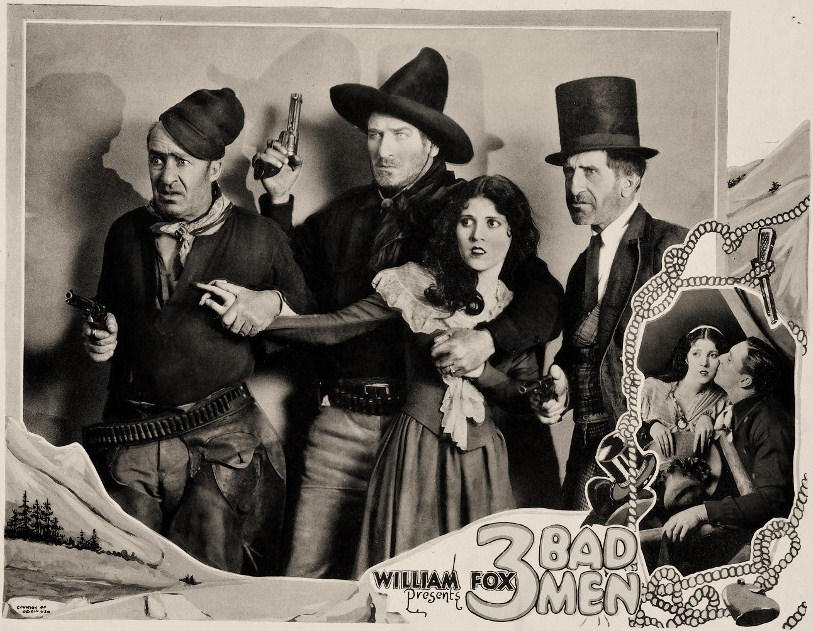
Lobby card for 3 Bad Men (1926), with Santschi second from left

Year	Title	Role	Notes
1909	Fighting Bob		
1909	A Country Girl's Peril		
1909	The Heart of a Race Tout		
1909	In the Sultan's Power		
1909	Mephisto and the Maiden		
1909	Ben's Kid		
1909	On the Border		
1909	Up San Juan Hill		
1909	Faust		
1910	Across the Plains		
1910	Davy Crockett		
1910	Mazeppa		
1910	The Sergeant		
1910	Pride of the Range		
1911	Kit Carson's Wooing		
1911	The Heart of John Barlow		
1912	The Count of Monte Cristo	Danglars	as William T. Santschi
1912	A Broken Spur	Ed Harvey	
1912	A Crucial Test	Bill Wildern	
1912	Euchered	Tom Saunders	
1913	The Adventures of Kathlyn	Bruce	
1913	Alas! Poor Yorick	Hamlet McGinnis	
1913	In the Long Ago	Indian Warrior	
1913	Wamba, a Child of the Jungle	Portuguese Pete	
1914	The Spoilers	Alex McNamara	
1915	The Lion's Mate	Hamad	
1916	The Crisis	Stephen Brice	
1916	The Country That God Forgot	Steve Brant	
1917	Beware of Strangers	John Mentor	
1917	Who Shall Take My Life?	"Big Bill" O'Shaughnessy	
1918	The Hell Cat	Jim Dyke	
1918	The City of Purple Dreams	Daniel Fitzhugh, the derelict	
1918	The Still Alarm	Jack Manley	
1918	Little Orphant Annie	Dave	
1919	The Love That Dares	Perry Risdon	
1919	Rose of the West	Lieut. Col. Bruce Knight	
1919	The Railroader	Clive Standish	
1919	The Stronger Vow	Pedro Toral	
1919	Shadows	Jack McGoff	
1919	Eve in Exile	John Sheen	
1920	Sagebrush Musketeers		Short
1921	Sheriff of the Mojave		Short
1921	The Death Trap		Short
1921	The Desert Wolf		Short
1921	Lorraine of the Timberlands		Short
1921	Mother o' Dreams		Short
1921	The Honor of Rameriz	Rameriz	Short
1921	The Spirit of the Lake		Short
1921	The Heart of Doreon	Doreon	Short
1921	The Secret of Butte Ridge		Short
1922	Two Kinds of Women	Bud Lee	
1923	Is Divorce a Failure?	Smith	
1923	Thundering Dawn	Gordon Van Brock	
1923	Tipped Off	Dan Grogan	
1924	The Plunderer	Bill Presbey	
1924	Little Robinson Crusoe	Captain Dynes	
1925	Beyond the Border	Nick Perdue	
1925	The Night Ship	Captain Jed Hobbs	
1925	Paths to Paradise	Callahan	
1926	Siberia	Alexis Vetkin	
1926	My Own Pal	August Deering	
1926	Her Honor, the Governor	Richard Palmer	
1926	The Hidden Way	Bill	
1926	3 Bad Men	"Bull" Stanley	
1926	Jim the Conqueror	Sam Black	
1926	The Desert's Toll	Jasper	
1926	The Third Degree	Daredevil Daly	
1926	No Man's Gold		
1927	When a Man Loves	Captain of the convict boat	
1927	Tracked by the Police	Sandy Sturgeon	
1927	The Adventurous Soul	Captain Svenson	
1927	Eyes of the Totem	Philip La Rue	
1927	Old San Francisco	Captain Stoner	
1927	Hills of Kentucky	Ben Harley	
1928	Land of the Silver Fox	Butch Nelson	
1928	The Law and the Man	Dan Creedon	
1928	Vultures of the Sea		
1929	In Old Arizona	Cowpuncher	
1929	The Wagon Master	Jake Lynch	
1930	River's End	Shotwell	
1930	The Utah Kid	Butch	
1931	Ten Nights in a Barroom	Simon Slady	
1931	The Phantom of the West	Bud Landers	
1931	King of the Wild	Harris	

=== Director ===
Year	Title	Notes
1910	The Sanitarium	
1914	Caryl of the Mountains	
1915	The Heart of Paro	
1915	The Octopus	Also screenwriter
1915	His Fighting Blood	
1915	The Blood Seedling	
1915	A Sultana of the Desert	
1915	The Lion's Mate	
