= Love Before Breakfast =

1936 film by Walter Lang

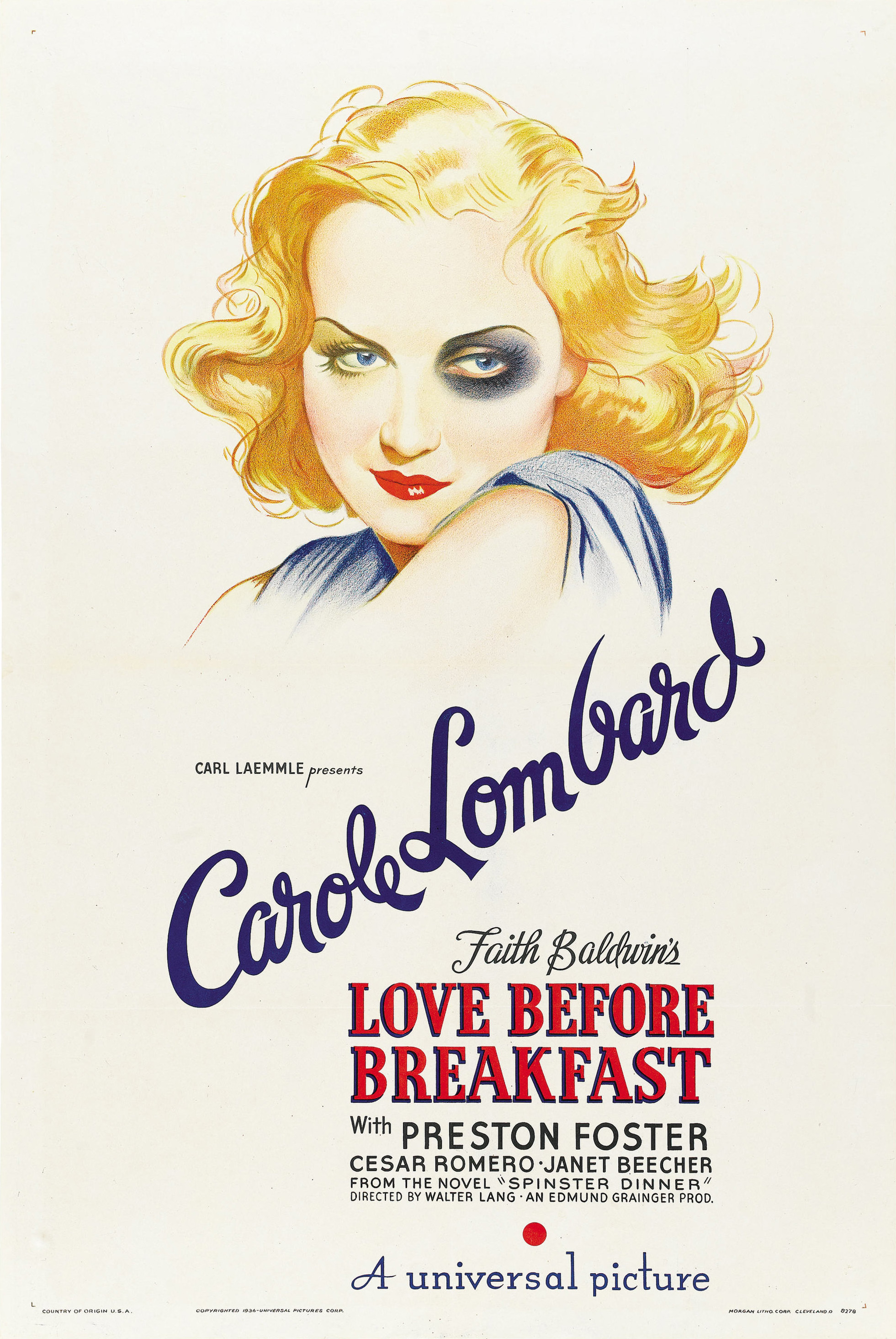
- Theatrical release poster
- Directed by: Walter Lang
- Written by: Story: Claude Binyon (uncredited); Treatment: Harry Clork; Doris Malloy; Preston Sturges (all uncredited); Add'l dialogue: Gertrude Purcell (uncredited); Screenplay: Herbert Fields
- Based on: "Spinster Dinner" by Faith Baldwin
- Produced by: Edmund Grainger
- Starring: Carole Lombard; Preston Foster; Cesar Romero; Janet Beecher
- Cinematography: Ted Tetzlaff
- Edited by: Maurice E. Wright
- Music by: Arthur Morton; Franz Waxman
- Production company: Universal Pictures
- Distributed by: Universal Pictures
- Release date: March 9, 1936
- Running time: 70 minutes
- Country: United States
- Language: English

Love Before Breakfast is a 1936 American romantic comedy film directed by Walter Lang and starring Carole Lombard, Preston Foster, Cesar Romero, and Janet Beecher. The screenplay by Herbert Fields, assisted by numerous contract writers including Preston Sturges, is based on Faith Baldwin's short story "Spinster Dinner", published in International-Cosmopolitan in July 1934.

== Plot ==
Kay Colby, a young Park Avenue socialite, is engaged to Bill Wadsworth, whose primary concern is advancing his career. In order to pursue Kay romantically, Bill's rival, millionaire Scott Miller, buys the oil company Bill works for and has him transferred to Japan. Scott then sends his own girlfriend, Countess Campanella, to Honolulu to get her out of the way as well. Devastated by Bill's departure, Kay is consoled by Scott, but is annoyed by his persistence and furious to learn that he was the one who sent Bill away. Scott follows Kay to a bar, where he confronts a young man who flirts with Kay. As the young man is joined by his friends, they all get into a brawl, during which Scott accidentally hits Kay and gives her a black eye.

The following day, when Kay visits her beautician to treat her black eye, Scott pays the beautician off and appears at Kay's side, once again infuriating her. Despite Kay's disdain for Scott, her mother approves of him. Scott continues to stalk Kay over the next few days, sending a Pekingese puppy to her house and getting her date to a fancy-dress party drunk so that Scott can escort her instead. Kay reluctantly attends the party with Scott, and after she tries to set him up with a naive Southern belle, Scott proclaims he will stop chasing Kay, who is still in love with Bill.

Not having received any word from Bill since his departure, Kay agrees to marry Scott but insists it is only for his money, not for love. Scott initially accepts the conditions, but since he is still in love with Kay, he brings Bill back from Japan and releases her from their engagement, not wanting to marry a woman who is in love with someone else. Tired of Scott's manipulative nature, Kay storms off and reunites with Bill. When Scott invites Kay and Bill to his country estate for the weekend, Kay says they have a prior engagement with Bill's friends to go on a yacht.

To Kay's dismay, Bill acquires a small sailboat for them to use before joining his friends on their yacht later. Scott, who is on a nearby yacht with Kay's mother as his guest, invites Kay and Bill to join him, but she angrily refuses. Realizing that Kay is in love with Scott, Bill becomes drunk. When a storm breaks out, Kay refuses assistance from Scott's crew until they forcibly take her and Bill aboard. After Kay defies Scott's orders to rest, they get into a heated argument until they eventually agree to get married. During their wedding ceremony on the yacht, Kay and Scott bicker over her refusal to obey him.

== Cast ==
- Carole Lombard as Kay Colby
- Preston Foster as Scott Miller
- Cesar Romero as Bill Wadsworth
- Janet Beecher as Mrs. Colby
- Betty Lawford as Countess Campanella
- Richard Carle as Brinkerhoff
- Forrester Harvey as chief steward
- Joyce Compton as Mary Lee
- Bert Roach as party host
- Diana Gibson as the secretary

Uncredited

- John Rogers as Dickson
- Donald Briggs as Stuart Farnum
- George Beranger as Charles
- Jack Mower as doorman
- Alphonse Martell as headwaiter at Dubin's
- Dennis O'Keefe as college boy
- Ada Mae Vaughn as college girl
- Theodore von Eltz as Clerk
- E. E. Clive as yacht captain
- Edward Earle as quartermaster

== Production ==
Love Before Breakfast had the working title of Spinster Dinner, the title of the Faith Baldwin short story it was based on. Several months before filming began, it was reported that Melvyn Douglas would take the male lead.

Carole Lombard was under contract to Paramount, who lent her to Universal for this film, in exchange for Margaret Sullavan going there to do So Red The Rose. Lombard also brought technical staff from Paramount, including photographer Ted Tetzlaff and costume designer Travis Banton.

Lombard, who had the contractual right to reject scripts, did not like the ones she was presented for Love Before Breakfast, including those written by Preston Sturges, Claude Binyon, Samuel Hoffenstein, Harry Clork, Doris Malloy, and William Conselman. Eventually, she accepted Herbert Fields's script.

Love Before Breakfast was in production from December 16, 1935, to January 27, 1936, and was released on March 9, 1936.
