= Louise Henry =

Louise Henry may refer to:

- Louise Henry Hoover (1874–1944), maiden name of the wife of Herbert Hoover and First Lady of the United States
- Louise Henry (actress) (1911–1967), American film actress
