= Princess O'Hara =

1935 film by David Burton

- Directed by: David Burton
- Written by: Damon Runyon; Harry Clork; Doris Malloy; Nat Ferber; Robert C. Rothafel
- Produced by: Leonard Spigelgass
- Starring: Jean Parker; Chester Morris; Leon Errol
- Cinematography: Norbert Brodine
- Edited by: Albert Akst
- Music by: Arthur Morton
- Production company: Universal Pictures
- Distributed by: Universal Pictures
- Release date: April 1, 1935
- Running time: 79 minutes
- Country: United States
- Language: English

Princess O'Hara is a 1935 American comedy film directed by David Burton and starring Jean Parker, Chester Morris and Leon Errol. The story was adapted for the 1943 Abbott and Costello film It Ain't Hay.

== Cast ==
- Jean Parker as Princess O'Hara
- Chester Morris as Vic Toledo
- Leon Errol as Last Card Louie
- Vince Barnett as Fingers
- Henry Armetta as Spidoni
- Verna Hillie as Alberta Whitley
- Ralph Remley as King O'Hara
- Dorothy Gray as Maggie O'Hara
- Anne Howard as Hannah O'Hara
- Jimmy Fay as Pat O'Hara
- Phillip Trent as Tad
- Clara Blandick as Miss Van Cortland
- Pepi Sinoff as Mrs. Goldberg
- Tom Dugan as Deadpan

== Production ==
The film's sets were designed by the art director Albert S. D'Agostino.

== Bibliography ==
- Furmanek, Bob and Ron Palumbo. Abbott and Costello in Hollywood. Perigee, 1991.
