= Diana Gibson =

American actress

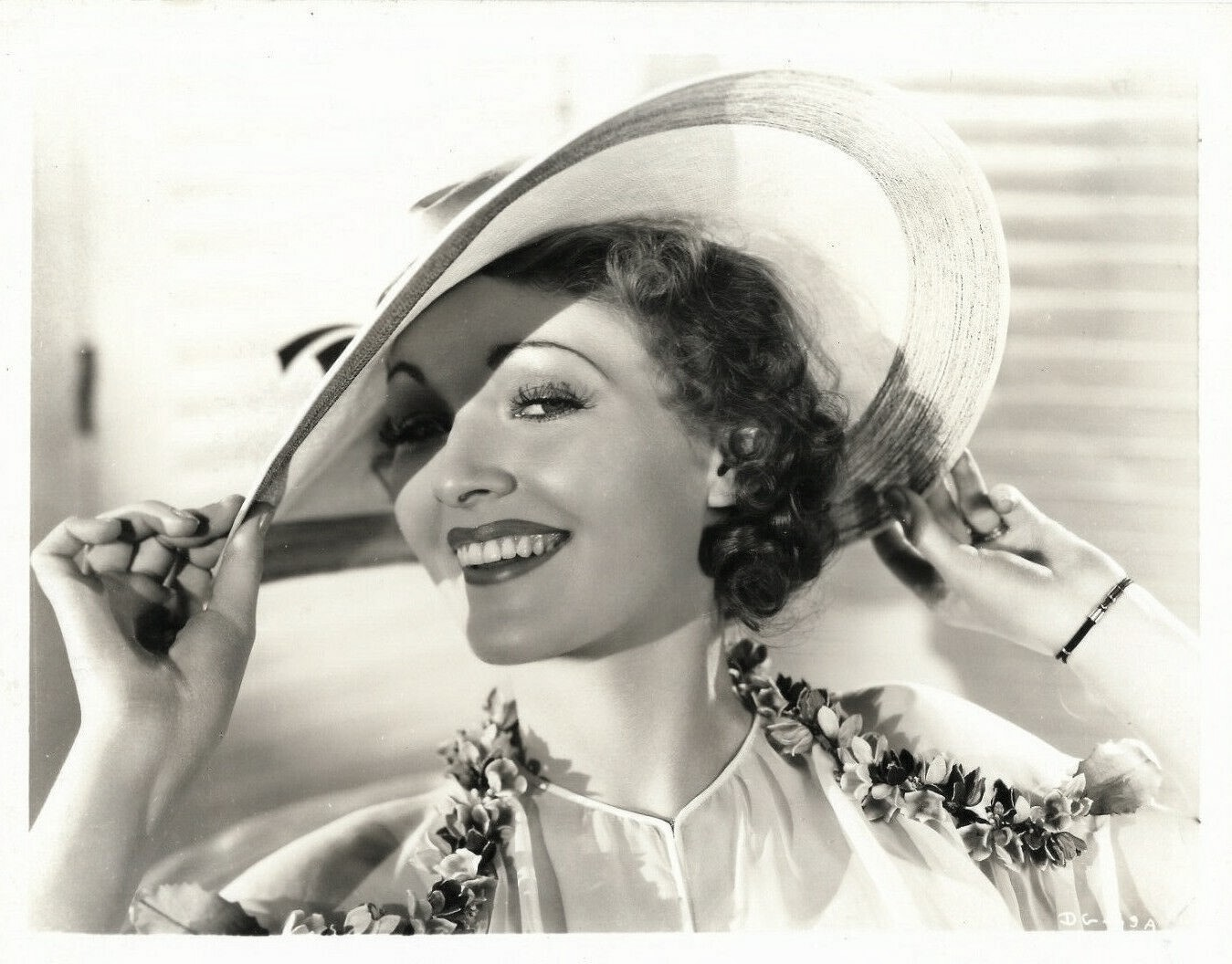
- Born: Rosemary LaBie; March 21, 1915; Chicago, Illinois, United States
- Died: October 12, 1991 (aged 76); Coral Gables Florida, United States
- Occupations: Actress; businesswoman
- Years active: 1935-1939

Diana Gibson (March 21, 1915 – October 12, 1991) was an American film actress.

The daughter of Mr. and Mrs. M. E. LaBie, Gibson was born Rosemary LaBie in Chicago, Illinois. Her name was changed when she signed a contract with Universal in 1935. She arrived in Los Angeles as a result of winning a beauty contest sponsored by the Balaban and Katz theater corporation. She was a night club dancer before she started her film career in 1935 with a role in His Night Out, starring Edward Everett Horton and Irene Hervey. She appeared in nine film roles in 1936, four of which were uncredited. She starred opposite John Wayne in the 1937 film Adventure's End, which would be her best-known role. That year she appeared in six films, in five credited roles.

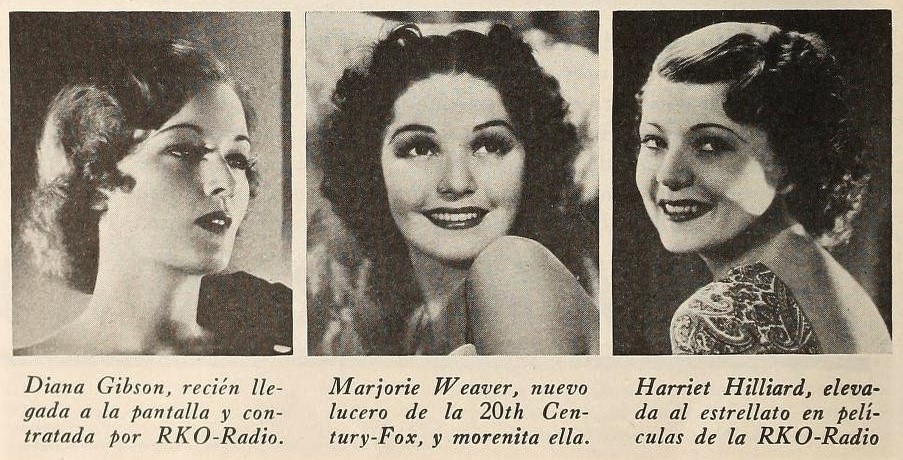
Gibson, Marjorie Weaver, and Harriet Hilliard (1937)

However, in 1938 and 1939 her career took a downward turn, and she only appeared in three films over the two years; two of her roles were uncredited. Her last credited role was in the 1938 film Western Welcome starring Ray Whitley. She retired from films afterward.

In 1954, Gibson began hosting The Talk of the Town, a new program on WLBR-TV in Lancaster, Pennsylvania. She had been the hostess of Know Your Hospital.

Gibson was married to Jack Schropp, who was an actor but later became general manager of the Lebanon News Publishing Company in Pennsylvania. She was the corporation's treasurer. The couple lived in Key Largo, Florida, from 1983 until he died in 1986. She eventually settled in Coral Gables, Florida, where she was residing at the time of her death in 1991.

== Filmography ==
Year	Title	Role	Notes
1935	His Night Out	Minor Role	Uncredited
1936	Dangerous Waters	Ruth Denning	
1936	Love Before Breakfast	Secretary	
1936	Nobody's Fool	Blondie	
1936	The Phantom Rider	Helen Moore	Serial
1936	Postal Inspector	Minor Role	Uncredited
1936	Yellowstone	Cigarette Girl	Uncredited
1936	Two in a Crowd	Secretary	Uncredited
1936	Ace Drummond	Stewardess	Serial, Uncredited
1936	Flying Hostess	Party Girl	Uncredited
1937	They Wanted to Marry	Helen	
1937	The Man Who Found Himself	Helen Richards	
1937	Wrong Romance		Short
1937	Behind the Headlines	Mary Bradley	
1937	Stage Door	Actress	Uncredited
1937	Adventure's End	Janet Drew	
1938	Go Chase Yourself	Dining Car Woman	Uncredited
1938	Western Welcome	Frances Jones - the New Ranch Owner	
1939	When Tomorrow Comes	Waitress	Uncredited
