= King Solomon of Broadway =

1935 film by Alan Crosland

- Directed by: Alan Crosland
- Written by: Harry Clork; Albert J. Cohen; Doris Malloy; Robert T. Shannon
- Produced by: Julius Bernheim
- Starring: Edmund Lowe; Dorothy Page; Pinky Tomlin
- Cinematography: George Robinson
- Edited by: Daniel Mandell
- Music by: David Klatzkin
- Production company: Universal Pictures
- Distributed by: Universal Pictures
- Release date: October 1, 1935
- Running time: 75 minutes
- Country: United States
- Language: English

King Solomon of Broadway is a 1935 American musical film directed by Alan Crosland and starring Edmund Lowe, Dorothy Page and Pinky Tomlin. A shady figure wins a nightclub during a card game.

== Cast ==
- Edmund Lowe as King Solomon
- Dorothy Page as Sheba
- Pinky Tomlin as Pinky
- Louise Henry as Nikki Bradbury
- Edward Pawley as 'Ice' Larson
- Charley Grapewin as Uncle Winchester
- Bradley Page as Roth
- Arthur Vinton as Murray
- Clyde Dilson as Schultz
- William Bailey as Detective
- Frank Du Frane as Detective
- Knute Erickson as Dooman
- Huntley Gordon as Doctor
- Arthur Stuart Hull as Judge
- Charles Judels as Hot dog man
- Isabel La Mal as Maid
- Sam McDaniel as Attendant
- Charles R. Moore as Waiter
- Fred Santley as Announcer
- Fred 'Snowflake' Toones as Waiter
- Guy Usher as Detective
- Marie Werner as Wash woman
- Eric Wilton as Butler

== Reception ==
Andre Sennwald of the The New York Times described the film as an "earnest melodrama" and suggested the producers unsuccessfully attempted to portray the star, Edmund Lowe, a "a debonair charm-boy." Sennwald discussed the cast members, and commented, "Mr. Lowe plays with his customary confidence, wearing his evening clothes faultlessly and voicing a variety of feeble witticisms as if he believed in their vast humor. As the singer with whom he falls in love, Dorothy Page is agreeable enough without quite fulfilling Mr. Lowe's description of her when he remarks, in one of his more hilarious moments, that she has everything Mae West talks about. Mr. Pawley is effective as the misunderstood gunman."

Variety wrote that the "racketeer" theme had grown "stale", and that the film was "elemental, but with fairly good spots here and there." The "nice scenery and good direction" were not enough to make the film interesting.

In their December, 1935 edition, Modern Screen gave the film a two-star review and commented that it was "revival month for gangster pictures" and that this film, with "actors who talk out of the side of their mouths, joins the parade." The reviewer found little of interest in the film and concluded that its assets were "a couple of swingy tunes, some good lines, and Pinky Tomlin."

== Bibliography ==
- Monaco, James. The Encyclopedia of Film. Perigee Books, 1991.
