= Verna Hillie =

American actress (1914–1991)

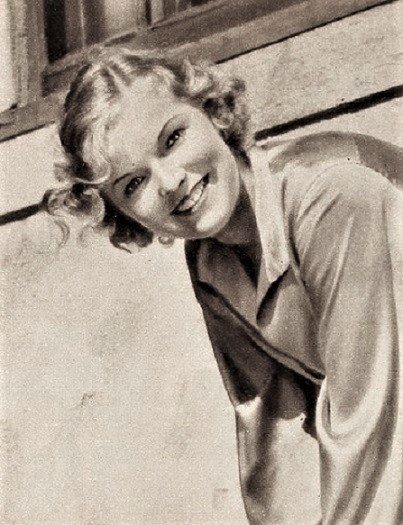
- Hillie in 1933
- Born: Verna Dolores Hillie; May 5, 1914; Hancock, Michigan, U.S.
- Died: October 3, 1997 (aged 83); Fairfield, Connecticut, U.S.
- Occupation: Actress
- Years active: 1932–1941
- Spouses: Frank Gill Jr. (m. 1933; div. 1952) Dick Linkroum (m. 1952; div. 1962)
- Children: 2, including Pamela Lincoln

Verna Dolores Hillie (May 5, 1914 – October 3, 1997) was an American film actress. First recruited into movie acting by a contest, she went on to star in films for Paramount Pictures and other studios through the 1930s, before retiring from acting in the early 1940s.

== Acting career ==
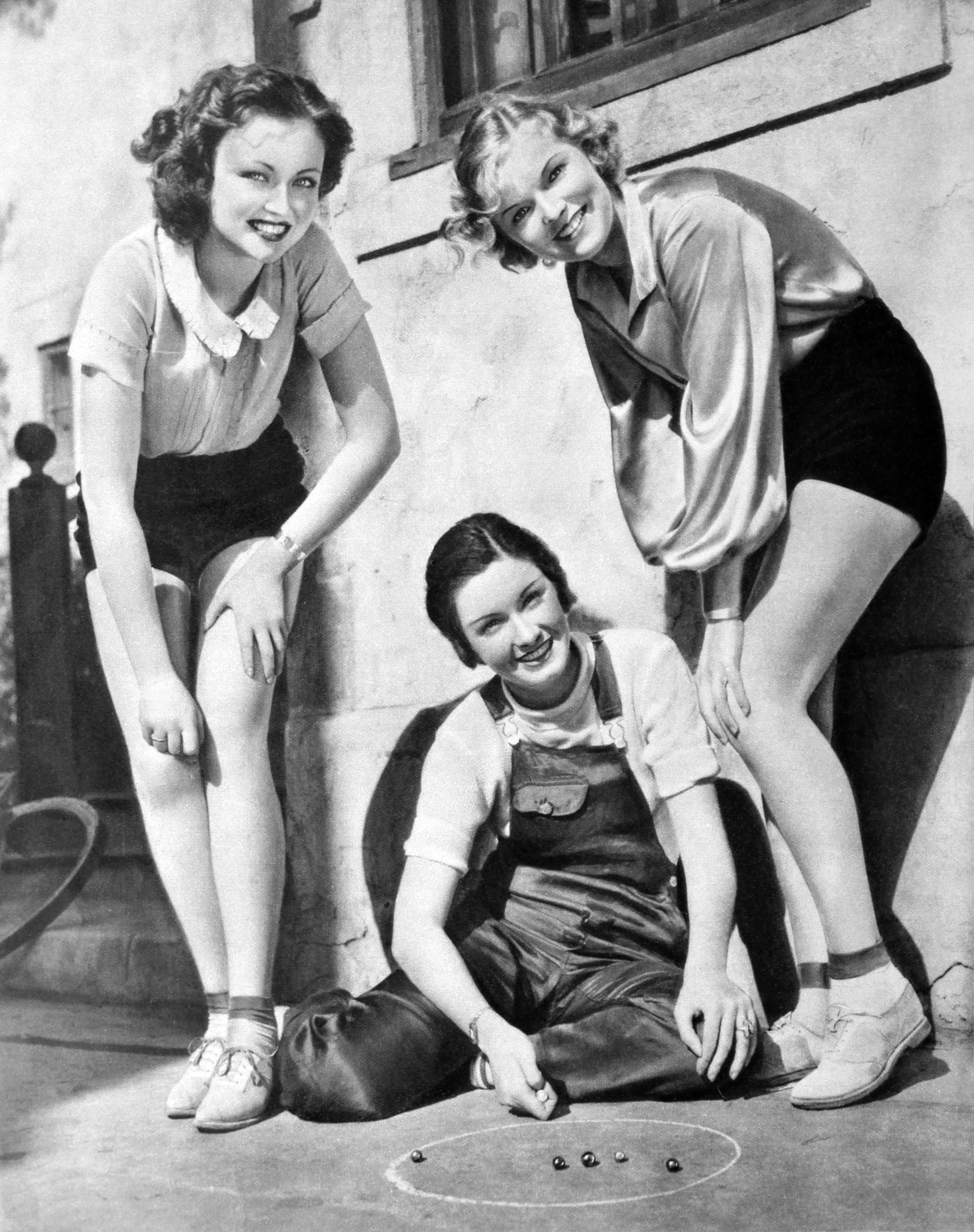
Lona Andre, Gail Patrick, and Verna Hillie were finalists in Paramount's "Panther Woman" competition (1932)

Hillie began acting as a teenager in Detroit, Michigan, where she got a part in a radio drama on station WWJ. Against her wishes, her mother submitted her photo to a national competition for the role of "Lota the Panther Woman" in Paramount's 1932 film Island of Lost Souls. When Paramount contacted her for a tryout, she reluctantly agreed, but eventually came to enjoy the process. She lost the competition to Kathleen Burke, but the studio gave her a contract anyway, starting her with a bit part in Madame Butterfly.

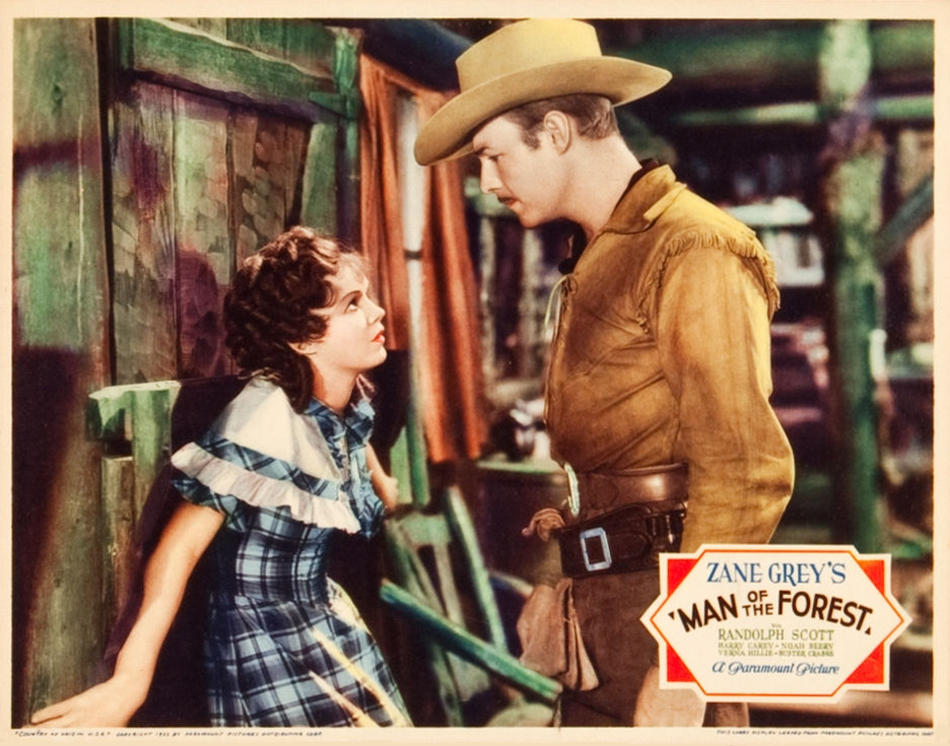
Hillie with Randolph Scott in Man of the Forest in 1933.

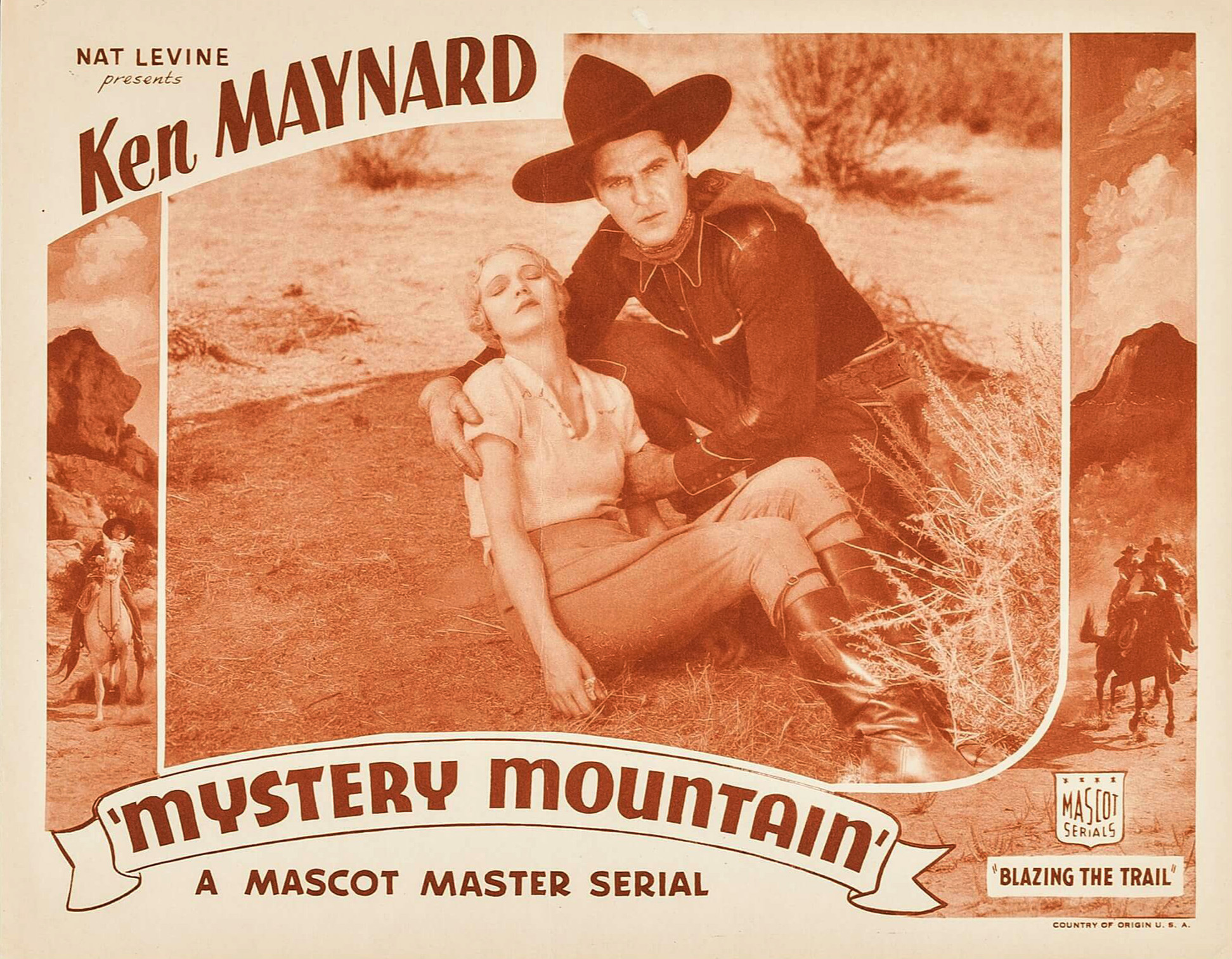
Lobby card for Mystery Mountain (1934)

She became better known after her supporting role in Under the Tonto Rim in 1933. When Hillie contracted Bell's palsy, Paramount dropped her contract, but she soon recovered and began working for other studios. In 1934 she co-starred with Ken Maynard in Mystery Mountain, a Western serial film from Mascot Pictures. She then starred opposite John Wayne in The Star Packer and The Trail Beyond for Monogram Pictures. She had some minor roles in movies for Universal Studios, such as I've Been Around in 1935, but the studio stopped using her after she spurned romantic advances from production executive Carl Laemmle, Jr. She also appeared in the Broadway production of Night of January 16th in 1935.

== Personal life ==
Hillie married radio emcee Frank Gill Jr., in 1933. They had two children (Kelly and Pamela Lincoln), and divorced in 1952. Hillie retired from acting in the 1940s to focus on raising her children, returning to work as "Clara Bagley" in two early 1950s episodes of The George Burns and Gracie Allen Show. In 1952 she married NBC executive Richard Linkroun. They divorced after 11 years. After her divorce from Linkroun, Hillie worked in health care administration for several years. She was later the United States representative for English author Barbara Cartland. She died in 1997 in Fairfield, Connecticut from a stroke.

== Selected filmography ==
- Madame Butterfly (1932) - Bridesmaid (uncredited)
- From Hell to Heaven (1933) - Sonnie Lockwood
- Under the Tonto Rim (1933) - Nina Weston
- Man of the Forest (1933) - Alice Gayner
- Duck Soup (1933) - Trentino's Blonde Secretary (uncredited)
- Search for Beauty (1934) - Susie (uncredited)
- Six of a Kind (1934) - Safe-Deposit Clerk (uncredited)
- House of Mystery (1934) - Ella Browning
- The Star Packer (1934) - Anita Matlock
- Romance in the Rain (1934) - Cinderella Girl
- The Trail Beyond (1934) - Felice Newsome
- Mystery Mountain (1934) - Jane Corwin
- I've Been Around (1935) - Girl
- Princess O'Hara (1935) - Alberta Whitley
- Rescue Squad (1935) - Norma Britt
- Mister Dynamite (1935) - Mona Lewis
- Rebellious Daughters (1938) - Barbara 'Babe' Webster
- The Reluctant Dragon (1941) - Sculptor (uncredited)
