= Gambling Lady =

1934 film by Archie Mayo

- Theatrical release poster
- Directed by: Archie Mayo
- Screenplay by: Doris Malloy; Ralph Block
- Story by: Doris Malloy
- Produced by: Henry Blanke
- Starring: Barbara Stanwyck; Joel McCrea; Pat O'Brien
- Cinematography: George Barnes
- Edited by: Harold McLernon
- Music by: Bernhard Kaun
- Distributed by: Warner Bros. Pictures, Inc.
- Release date: March 31, 1934 (USA)
- Running time: 66 minutes
- Country: United States
- Language: English
- Budget: $230,000
- Box office: $653,000

Gambling Lady is a 1934 American pre-Code romantic drama film directed by Archie Mayo, and starring Barbara Stanwyck, Joel McCrea and Pat O'Brien.

== Plot ==
Mike Lee raises his daughter Lady Lee to be as honest a gambler as he is. When he gets too much in debt to the underworld syndicate headed by Jim Fallin, he commits suicide rather than be pressured into running a crooked game. Lady initially goes to work for Fallin, then quits and sets out on her own when he tries to "help" her by providing a crooked dealer.

Longtime admirer and bookie Charlie Lang proposes to her, but it is persistent young Garry Madison who wins her heart, despite unknowingly bringing two policemen in disguise to the illegal gambling den where she is playing. She resists marrying him, fearing the reaction of his high society father, Peter, but Garry is pleased to learn that she already knows and likes his father, a fellow gambler. However, Peter does disapprove of the union, offering to buy her off. When she rejects his money, but meekly gives up Garry, Peter realizes he has mistaken her motives. Being a sporting man, he offers to cut cards for his son. He draws a jack, but Lady picks a queen, and the young couple get married.

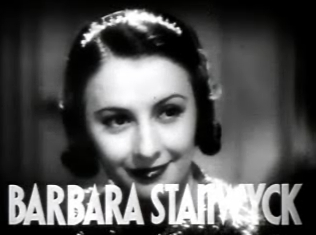
Barbara Stanwyck in Gambling Lady

They are happy at first, but then both feel the pangs of jealousy. When Garry's old girlfriend, Sheila Aiken, returns from Europe, he makes the mistake of greeting her too warmly. Lady challenges her to a game of cards and wins her jewelry. When Charlie Lang is arrested, Garry refuses his wife's request for $10,000 to bail him out, so she pawns Sheila's jewels to raise the money. Charlie offers to reimburse her, telling her that he intends to pressure the syndicate into paying for his silence about what he knows. Garry becomes incensed when Lady's involvement with Charlie is reported in the newspapers. He goes out to recover the pawn ticket, now in Charlie's hands. Garry does not return that night.

The next day, two policemen inform Lady that Garry has been arrested for Charlie's murder, having been seen arguing with him and later being found in possession of the pawn ticket. Lady figures out that Garry spent the night with Sheila but is unwilling to use that as an alibi. Lady sees Sheila, who is willing to testify, but only if Lady divorces her husband and insists on $250,000 alimony. Lady agrees to her terms.

Garry is released and the divorce is granted. Both Garry and Peter believe at first that Lady was in it for the money all along, but when Peter sees her tear up the check, he realizes they were wrong. Garry tricks Sheila into admitting the truth, then reconciles with Lady.

== Cast ==
- Barbara Stanwyck as Lady Lee
- Joel McCrea as Garry Madison
- Pat O'Brien as Charlie Lang
- Claire Dodd as Sheila Aiken
- C. Aubrey Smith as Peter Madison
- Robert Barrat as Mike Lee
- Arthur Vinton as Fallin
- Phillip Reed as Steve
- Philip Faversham as Don
- Robert Elliott as Graves
- Ferdinand Gottschalk as Cornelius
- Willard Robertson as District Attorney
- Huey White as Bodyguard

== Reception ==
Mordaunt Hall, critic for The New York Times, called it "a film which is strong on action and weak on plausibility." While he applauded the performances of McCrea and Smith, he only credited Stanwyck with "an adequate portrayal" and thought that Dodd was miscast.

According to Warner Bros. records the film earned $495,000 domestically and $158,000 internationally.
