= Rescue Squad (film) =

1935 film directed by Spencer Gordon Bennet

- Directed by: Spencer Gordon Bennet
- Written by: Charlotte Arthur; Margel Gluck; George Morgan; Betty Burbridge
- Produced by: Spencer Gordon Bennet; Lester F. Scott Jr.
- Starring: Ralph Forbes; Verna Hillie; Leon Ames
- Cinematography: Gilbert Warrenton
- Production company: Empire Pictures
- Distributed by: Empire Pictures
- Release date: April 3, 1935
- Running time: 61 minutes
- Country: United States
- Language: English

Rescue Squad is a 1935 American crime film directed by Spencer Gordon Bennet and starring Ralph Forbes, Verna Hillie and Leon Ames.

== Cast ==
- Ralph Forbes DeWitt Porter
- Verna Hillie as Norma Britt
- Leon Ames as Lester Vaughn
- Kate Pentzer as Mollie Borden
- Sheila Terry as Rose
- Beth Bartman as Daisy Dane
- Frank Leigh as Azoor
- Catherine Cotter as Jennie, Aoor's Daughter
- Jimmy Aubrey as Henry, the Janitor

== Bibliography ==
- Pitts, Michael R. Poverty Row Studios, 1929–1940: An Illustrated History of 55 Independent Film Companies, with a Filmography for Each. McFarland & Company, 2005.
