= Mister Dynamite =

1935 film by Alan Crosland

- Directed by: Alan Crosland
- Screenplay by: Doris Malloy; Harry Clork
- Produced by: E.M. Asher
- Starring: Edmund Lowe; Jean Dixon; Victor Varconi; Esther Ralston; Verna Hillie; Minor Watson
- Cinematography: George Robinson
- Edited by: Murray Seldeen
- Production company: Universal Pictures
- Distributed by: Universal Pictures
- Release date: April 22, 1935
- Running time: 67 minutes
- Country: United States
- Language: English

Mister Dynamite is a 1935 American action film directed by Alan Crosland and written by Doris Malloy and Harry Clork. The film stars Edmund Lowe, Jean Dixon, Victor Varconi, Esther Ralston, Verna Hillie and Minor Watson. The film was released on April 22, 1935, by Universal Pictures.

== Plot ==
Private detective T.N. Thompson, nicknamed "Dynamite" due to his initials, takes an interest when a man is murdered in San Francisco leaving a casino.

The dead man, D.H. Matthews, had an argument outside the casino with Jarl Dvorjak, a celebrated pianist who was gambling while his aloof and money-mad wife Charmian was away. Dvorjak's acquaintance with Mona Lewis led him to the casino, which is owned by her father Clark Lewis and closed by the police after the killing.

Mona becomes a suspect, particularly after Dvorjak's business manager Carey Williams is killed as well. When the pianist himself is shot while playing an organ, Thompson puts everything together and reveals to all that Matthews had actually been a son of Dvorjak's from a previous marriage who was conspiring with Charmian to gain his fortune.

== Cast ==
- Edmund Lowe as T.N. Thompson / Mr. Dynamite
- Jean Dixon as Lynn Marlo
- Victor Varconi as Jarl Dvorjak
- Esther Ralston as Charmian Dvorjak
- Verna Hillie as Mona Lewis
- Minor Watson as Clark Lewis
- Robert Gleckler as James V. King
- Jameson Thomas as Carey Williams
- Greta Meyer as Jans
- Frank Lyman as D.H. Matthews
- G. Pat Collins as Rod
- Bradley Page as Felix
- James P. Burtis as Joe
- Matt McHugh as Sunshine

== Development ==
According to Layman and Rivett, the script for Mister Dynamite was based on a screen treatment written by Dashiell Hammett, commissioned by Darryl Zanuck at Warner Bros. for "another original Sam Spade story," following the first film adaption of Hammett's The Maltese Falcon. Hammett's commission for that treatment was for "motion picture production...featuring the actor, William Powell." Zanuck rejected the treatment, explaining that "The finished story [had] none of qualifications of Maltese Falcon, although the same character was in both stories." Rights to the treatment reverted to Hammett, who reworked it, re-titling it On the Make and renaming the detective character Gene Richmond. After further re-work, and another change of the detective's name (to T. N. Thompson), the treatment was sold to Universal in 1935, with the script "liberally reworked" by Malloy and Clork.
