= Two in a Crowd =

1936 film by Alfred E. Green

- Joel McCrea and Joan Bennett
- Directed by: Alfred E. Green
- Written by: Lewis R. Foster; Doris Malloy; Earle Snell; Melville Baker; Edward E. Paramore Jr. Samuel Hoffenstein
- Produced by: E.M. Asher; Charles R. Rogers
- Starring: Joan Bennett; Joel McCrea; Reginald Denny
- Cinematography: Joseph A. Valentine
- Edited by: Milton Carruth
- Music by: Heinz Roemheld
- Production company: Universal Pictures
- Distributed by: Universal Pictures
- Release date: October 4, 1936
- Running time: 85 minutes
- Country: United States
- Language: English

Two in a Crowd is a 1936 American romantic comedy film directed by Alfred E. Green and starring Joan Bennett, Joel McCrea and Reginald Denny. It was produced and released by Universal Pictures. The screenplay was written by Lewis R. Foster, Doris Malloy, and Earle Snell.

== Plot ==
Larry Stevens is about to be evicted by landlady Lillie for not paying his rent. He happens to be passing by, as does Julia Wayne, when two halves of a ripped $1,000 bill float down to the street.

Up above, gangster Bonelli has been handing out thousands to his girls. One who's angry with him has torn it and tossed it out the window.

Skeeter, a jockey, joins up with Julia and Larry as they discuss what to do with the money. Julia has a $500 debt she needs to repay. Larry wants to use it to enter his horse Hector's Pal in a big race.

The money was stolen from a bank where Larry takes the torn $1,000 bill. A suspicious detective, Flynn, begins to follow Larry, who also attracts the attention of unemployed actor Anthony and bank cashier Bennett, who want a piece of the action.

Larry is in love with Julia and wants to help fulfill her dream of performing in a show. A theatrical producer pretends to hire her on talent, but secretly has schemed with Larry to finance the show if his horse wins the race. Julia races to the race track to see how it all turns out.

== Cast ==
- Joan Bennett as Julia Wayne
- Joel McCrea as Larry Stevens
- Reginald Denny as Anthony
- Henry Armetta as Toscani
- Elisha Cook, Jr. as Skeeter
- Bill Burrud as Chet
- John Hamilton as Purdy
- Nat Pendleton as Flynn
- Donald Meek as Bennett
- Andy Clyde as Jonesy
- Bradley Page as Bonelli
- Alison Skipworth as Lillie
- Joe Sawyer as Bonelli's Henchman
- Paul Fix as Bonelli's Henchman
- Douglas Wood as Banker Ralston
- Barbara Rogers as Lawson Girl
- Eddie 'Rochester' Anderson as Swipe
- Tyler Brooke as Charles Brock
- Inez Courtney as Mrs. Flynn
- Natalie Moorhead as Mrs. Anthony
- Milburn Stone as Kennedy
- Paul Porcasi as Polito, the Headwaiter
- Nina Quartero as Celito
- Winter Hall as Judge
- James Flavin as Policeman
- Eddy Chandler as Policeman
- Edward Gargan as Policeman
- Evelyn Selbie as Tenement Woman
- Diana Gibson as Secretary
- Phyllis Crane as Moll

== Bibliography ==
- Dick, Bernard F. City of Dreams: The Making and Remaking of Universal Pictures. University Press of Kentucky, 2015.
- Fetrow, Alan G. . Sound films, 1927-1939: a United States Filmography. McFarland, 1992.
