= The Mad Parade =

1931 film

- Directed by: William Beaudine
- Written by: Gertrude Orr; Doris Malloy; Henry McCarty
- Produced by: William Beaudine
- Starring: Evelyn Brent
- Edited by: Richard Cahoon
- Production company: Liberty Pictures
- Distributed by: Paramount Pictures
- Release date: September 18, 1931
- Running time: 63 minutes
- Country: United States
- Language: English

The Mad Parade is a 1931 Pre-Code American feature film about women canteen workers toiling in a château near the front lines in France during World War I. It was directed by William Beaudine and starred Evelyn Brent. According to the American Film Institute catalog, this film was widely publicized as the first all-woman cast picture, although off-stage male voices are heard and parts of their bodies are shown in the picture.

== Cast ==
- Evelyn Brent as Monica Dale
- Irene Rich as Mrs. Schuyler
- Louise Fazenda as Fanny Smithers
- Lilyan Tashman as Lil Wheeler
- Marceline Day as Dorothy Quinlan
- Fritzi Ridgeway as Prudence Graham
- June Clyde as Janice Lee
