= Paris Interlude =

1934 film by Edwin L. Marin

- Directed by: Edwin L. Marin
- Screenplay by: Wells Root
- Based on: All Good Americans; 1934 play by S. J. Perelman; Laura Perelman
- Produced by: Lucien Hubbard
- Starring: Madge Evans; Otto Kruger; Robert Young; Una Merkel; Ted Healy; Louise Henry
- Cinematography: Milton R. Krasner
- Edited by: Conrad A. Nervig
- Music by: William Axt
- Production company: Metro-Goldwyn-Mayer
- Distributed by: Loew's Inc.
- Release date: July 27, 1934
- Running time: 72 minutes
- Country: United States
- Language: English

Paris Interlude is a 1934 American drama film directed by Edwin L. Marin and written by Wells Root. It is based on the play All Good Americans by Laura Perelman and S. J. Perelman. The film stars Madge Evans, Otto Kruger, Robert Young, Una Merkel, Ted Healy and Louise Henry. The film was released on July 27, 1934, by Metro-Goldwyn-Mayer.

== Plot ==
Julie has a star crossed romance with Sam, leaning on pal Cassie when unhappy. When Sam is believed dead Cassie urges Julie to take up with good guy Pat. When Sam returns Cassie tries to do the right thing by her best friend.

== Cast ==
- Madge Evans as Julie
- Otto Kruger as Sam
- Robert Young as Pat
- Una Merkel as Cassie
- Ted Healy as Jimmy
- Louise Henry as Mary Louise
- Edward Brophy as Ham
- George Meeker as Rex
- Bert Roach as Noble
- Richard Tucker as Stevens
