= Frank Markham Skipworth =

English painter (1854–1929)

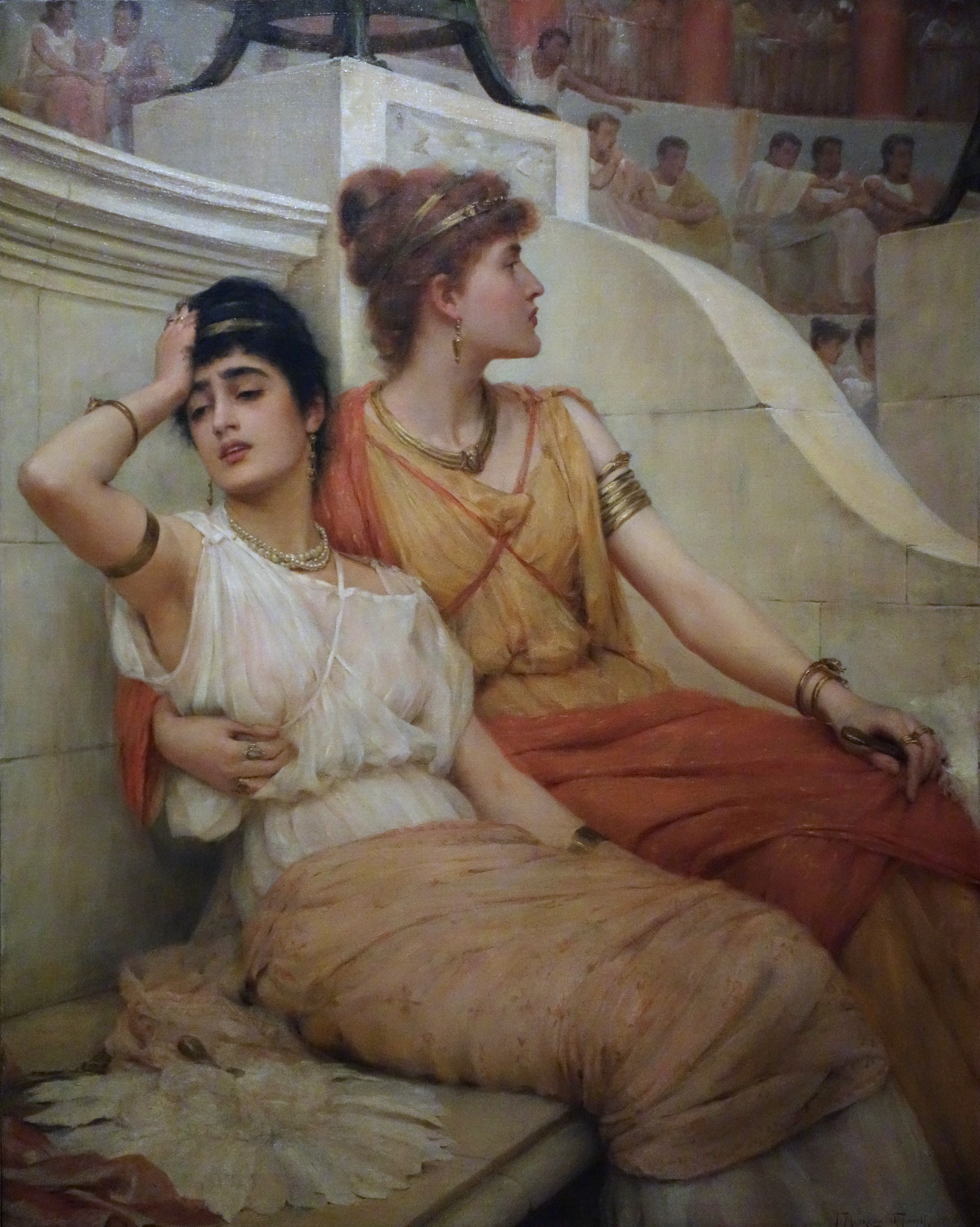
Frank Skipworth, A Roman Holiday (1889)

Frank Markham Skipworth (30 July 1854 – 10 March 1929) was an English painter who specialized in portraits, genre scenes, and occasional historical subjects, usually featuring women. Born in Caistor, Lincolnshire, he studied first at the Lincoln School of Art, then under Edward Poynter at the Royal Academy Schools for three years (1879–1882), and briefly under Adolphe William Bouguereau and Tony Robert-Fleury in Paris (1883–1884). He lived in the Chelsea district of London and exhibited at the Royal Academy from 1883 to 1916.

In 1882 he married Allison Skipworth, then 19 years old, who went on to become an accomplished stage and screen actress. The two were very poor, and Allison Skipworth later remarked that she had gone into acting to keep from starving to death. Frank Skipworth died in Tooting, south London, in 1929.
