= Adventure's End =

1937 film

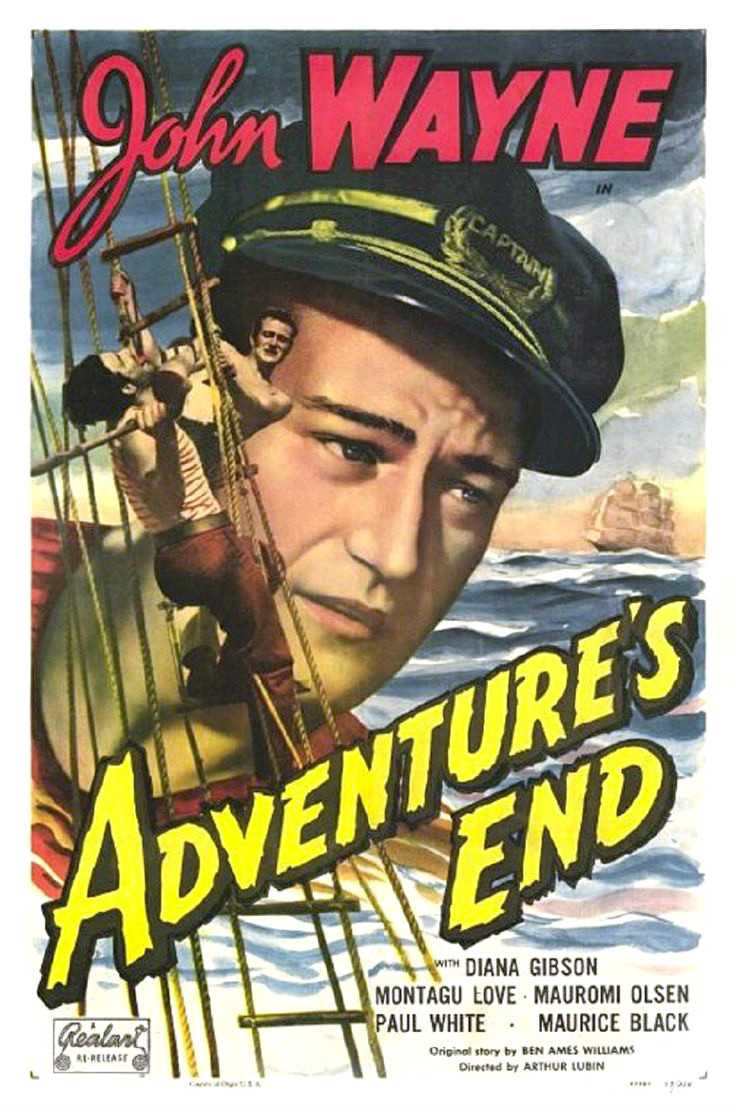
- Film poster
- Directed by: Arthur Lubin
- Screenplay by: Ben Grauman Kohn; Scott Darling; Sidney Sutherland
- Story by: Ben Ames Williams
- Produced by: Trem Carr; Paul Malvern
- Starring: John Wayne; Diana Gibson; Montagu Love; Moroni Olsen; Paul White; Maurice Black
- Cinematography: Gus Peterson; John Fulton
- Edited by: Charles Craft
- Production company: Universal Pictures
- Distributed by: Universal Pictures
- Release date: December 5, 1937
- Running time: 60 minutes
- Country: United States
- Language: English
- Budget: $90,000 or $100,000

Adventure's End is a 1937 American adventure film directed by Arthur Lubin and starring John Wayne and Diana Gibson. It was distributed by Universal Pictures. A surviving print of Adventure's End is reported to be held by the Library of Congress.

== Plot ==
Duke Slade, a Pacific islands pearl diver, signs up to sail on a whaling vessel. Before they sail, Captain Drew marries Slade to his daughter Janet, to protect him against his first mate, Rand Husk. When the crew mutinies at sea, Slade sides with the captain.

== Cast ==
- John Wayne as Duke Slade
- Diana Gibson as Janet Drew
- Montagu Love as Capt. Abner Drew
- Moroni Olsen as First Mate Rand Husk
- Maurice Black as Blackie
- Paul White as Kalo
- Cameron Hall as Slivers
- Patrick J. Kelly as Matt
- George Cleveland as Tom
- William Sundholm as Chips
- James T. Mack as Hooten
- Britt Wood as Hardy, Old Sailor
- Ben Carter as Stantul, Black Sailor
- Wally Howe as Kierce
- Jimmie Lucas as Flench, Black Cabin Boy
- Glenn Strange as Barzeck

== Production ==
Adventure's End was the last of six films John Wayne made at Universal. Four of them were directed by Arthur Lubin who later recalled they usually "had six days to shoot. There was no time schedule, as there is today, where if you go late at night or start early in the morning, you have to pay more. In those days, you could shoot twenty-four hours a day." Lubin says that Adventure's End was "very extravagant", because "we were going to shoot in ten days", and "it was going to be a big picture." He says Wayne films were often inspired by "What sets are up these days that we can make pictures on, that won’t cost us much money". Adventure's End was made because "there was a boat on Universal lot, and they could use that."

In November 1936 Trem Carr purchased Maid of Orleans, a 150-foot schooner, one of the last of the whaling ships on the west coast, in Vancouver. He purchased specifically for the film. Filming was postponed due to a shipping strike (other films affected by this strike include The Hurricane for Sam Goldwyn and Short Haul also starring Wayne at Universal). By February the strike was over and the film was officially on Universal's production slate; Carr sent a crew to Vancouver to sail the boat to Los Angeles.

Filming started early July 1937.

== Reception ==
The New York Times called the film a "pale reflection of several recent Hollywood sea epics."

== See also ==
- John Wayne filmography
