= Mystery Mountain (serial) =

1934 film

- Theatrical release poster
- Directed by: Otto Brower; B. Reeves Eason
- Written by: Bennett Cohen; B. Reeves Eason; Sherman L. Lowe; Barney A. Sarecky; Armand Schaefer
- Produced by: Nat Levine; Armand Schaefer; Victor Zobel
- Starring: Ken Maynard; Verna Hillie; Syd Saylor; Edward Earle; Hooper Atchley
- Cinematography: Ernest Miller; William Nobles
- Edited by: Earl Turner
- Music by: Lee Zahler
- Distributed by: Mascot Pictures
- Release date: December 3, 1934 (U.S.)
- Running time: 223 minutes (12 chapters)
- Country: United States
- Language: English

Mystery Mountain is a 1934 American Western serial film directed by Otto Brower and B. Reeves Eason and starring Ken Maynard, Verna Hillie, Syd Saylor, Edward Earle, and Hooper Atchley. Distributed by Mascot Pictures, Mystery Mountain features the second ever film appearance by Gene Autry.

== Plot ==
Ken Williams (Ken Maynard) is determined to discover the identity of a mysterious killer who preys upon railroads and transportation companies like the ones owned by Jane Corwin (Verna Hillie). Her railroad worker father (Lafe McKee) was the first victim of the murderous fiend known as the Rattler, who is especially difficult to catch because he makes himself appear as other people with a collection of masks, or he effects a strange disguise with eyeglasses, a fake nose, and a crepe-hair mustache. The Rattler — also known as "the Menace of the Mountain" — attempts to control the mountain and its hidden gold from his secret cave filled with strange electronic gadgets.

== Cast ==
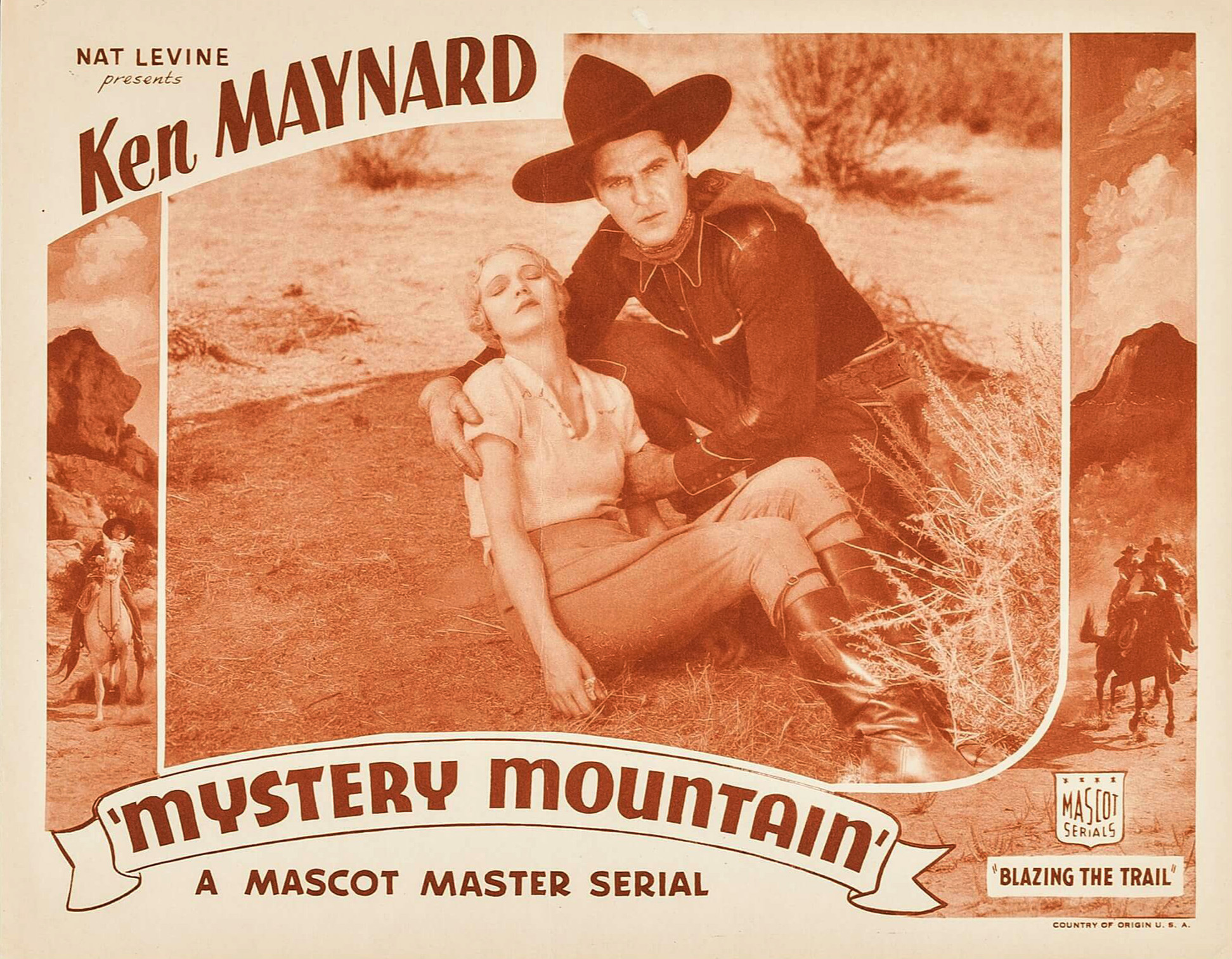
Lobby card

- Ken Maynard as Ken Williams, railroad detective
- Verna Hillie as Jane Corwin
- Syd Saylor as Breezy Baker
- Edward Earle as Frank Blayden
- Hooper Atchley as Dr Edwards
- Edward Hearn as Lake
- Al Bridge as Tom Henderson
- Bob Kortman as Hank, one of The Rattler's henchmen
- Lew Meehan as Red, one of The Rattler's henchmen
- George Chesebro as Anderson, one of The Rattler's henchmen
- Lester Alvin Burnett Lake Teamster
- Tom London as Morgan, one of The Rattler's henchmen
- Lynton Brent as Mathews, the telegrapher
- Tarzan as Tarzan (Ken Williams' horse)
- Gene Autry as Thomas, Lake Teamster (chapters 6,7,8,12) (uncredited)

== Production ==
=== Filming and budget ===
Mystery Mountain was filmed in the fall of 1934. The film had an operating budget of $65,000 (equal to $1,564,366 today), and a negative cost of $80,000.

=== Filming locations ===
- Bronson Canyon, Griffith Park, Los Angeles, California, USA
- Iverson Movie Ranch, Santa Susana Pass, Chatsworth, California, USA

=== Stuntwork ===
- Yakima Canutt
- Cliff Lyons (Ken Maynard's stunt double)

According to the book The Great Movie Serials: Their Sound and Fury, Ken Maynard was doubled by Cliff Lyons in some scenes but performed many of his own stunts, especially riding, in others. However, the later book In the Nick of Time states that Ken Maynard was doubled by his brother Kermit Maynard. The physical similarities between the two makes it difficult to spot the difference on screen between actor and stuntman. Maynard's horse, Tarzan, had three doubles, one of which was blind.

Future serial director William Witney, working as an assistant director, performed one stunt during this serial when the stuntman failed to show up to the location shoot. He rode a horse at speed across a bridge over a ravine with a moving train behind him.

=== Special effects ===
Special effects were provided by J. Laurence Wickland.

== Chapter titles ==
1. The Rattler
2. The Man Nobody Knows
3. The Eye That Never Sleeps
4. The Human Target
5. Phantom Outlaws
6. The Perfect Crime
7. Tarzan the Cunning
8. The Enemy's Stronghold
9. The Fatal Warning
10. The Secret of the Mountain
11. Behind the Mask
12. The Judgment of Tarzan

== See also ==
- List of film serials by year
- List of film serials by studio

Preceded by The Law of the Wild (1934)	Mascot Serial; Mystery Mountain (1934)	Succeeded by The Phantom Empire (1935)
