= Rebellious Daughters =

- Directed by: Jean Yarbrough
- Screenplay by: John W. Krafft
- Produced by: Ben Judell
- Starring: Marjorie Reynolds; Verna Hillie; Sheila Bromley
- Cinematography: M.A. Anderson
- Edited by: Carl Pierson
- Production company: Progressive Pictures
- Distributed by: Progressive Pictures
- Release date: July 1, 1938
- Running time: 69 minutes
- Country: United States
- Language: English

Rebellious Daughters is a 1938 American crime drama film. It was the first feature film directed by Jean Yarbrough, and starred Marjorie Reynolds. The film's producer was Ben Judell of Progressive Pictures, known for low-budget exploitation films with provocative titles; other films released by Progressive the same year included Delinquent Parents and Slander House.

== Plot ==
It is the night before the birthday of single child Barbara Webster. Her spoiled and unaffectionate mother tells her she will not be in town and she does not want her daughter to go with her where she's invited. Barbara, called also Babe, is quite disappointed about the coldness of her mother and relies on her father. Unfortunately, her mother tells her, he will be out of town as well. Barbara is left alone with her sadness about her parents not caring for her. That is what makes her call a friend Eddie to organize something for the evening. Eddie then asks Babe if she could "dig up a live one for" for his friend, Bill Evans, who is there with him. She answers, only the dead have to be dug up, and she will see if she can find something "dainty but dumb".

She calls an old friend, Claire Elliott. She would love to get out, but her father is rather severe and doesn't want her to go to night clubs. Babe nonetheless goes personally to talk with father Elliott and manages to persuade him. In the night club the two gentlemen leave the girls for some minutes to go and say hello to old friends. Meantime a woman, Flo Russell, comes to their table and tells them she works for Mr. Gilman, who owns an exclusive gown salon in New York and would be glad to have them as models in his shop.

The boys come back with the intention to go to another party. Claire is forced to go with the group. On the way they are caught by police and Claires father has to bring them home. He makes her a speech and forbids her to exit home. With Babe they decide to leave home and go to New York to work for Gilman. They are hired by Gilman but they soon discover that he has another racket going on in his shop: blackmailing rich customers photographing them in suspicious situations. The story evolves ...

== Cast ==
- Marjorie Reynolds as Claire Elliott
- Verna Hillie as Barbara Webster (Babe)
- Sheila Bromley as Flo Russell
- George Douglas (actor) as Joe Gilman
- Dennis Moore (actor) as Jimmie Adams (Reporter)
- Oscar O'Shea as Dad Elliott
- Irene Franklin as Ma Delacy
- Nick Lukats as Jerry Girard
- Monte Blue as Charlie, alias Clint Houston
- Lita Chevret as Kelly alias Rita Houston
- Vivien Oakland as Mrs. Webster
- Dick Hogan as Bill Evans
