= Remember Last Night? =

1935 film by James Whale

- Theatrical poster
- Directed by: James Whale
- Screenplay by: Harry Clork; Doris Malloy; Dan Totheroh
- Based on: The Hangover Murders; 1935 novel by Adam Hobhouse
- Produced by: Carl Laemmle, Jr.
- Starring: Edward Arnold; Constance Cummings; Robert Young
- Cinematography: Joseph Valentine
- Edited by: Ted Kent
- Music by: Franz Waxman
- Production company: Universal Pictures Corp.
- Distributed by: Universal Pictures Corp.
- Release date: November 4, 1935
- Running time: 81 minutes
- Country: United States
- Language: English
- Budget: $460,000

Remember Last Night? is a 1935 American mystery comedy film directed by James Whale. The film, based on the novel The Hangover Murders, is about the investigation of the murder of one of a group of friends. The survivors are unable to recall the events of the night of the murder because they were all too drunk. Remember Last Night? features an ensemble cast headed by Edward Arnold, Constance Cummings, and Robert Young.

Whale convinced Universal Studios head Carl Laemmle, Jr. to buy the screen rights to the novel so Whale could avoid directing Dracula's Daughter, as he wished not to direct another horror film so soon after shooting Bride of Frankenstein. Initial drafts of the screenplay were deemed unsuitable under the Hays Code because of the focus on excessive drinking. The novel's original title was also unsuitable because of the word "hangover". Following revisions, the film was approved and was released on November 4, 1935, to mixed reviews and poor box office results.

== Plot ==
To celebrate their six-month anniversary, Long Island socialites Tony and Carlotta Milburn arrange a wild drinking party with friends, culminating in a stop at the restaurant owned by Faronea. They are unaware that Faronea is conspiring with Baptiste Bouclier, the chauffeur of party host Vic Huling, to kidnap Vic. The next morning the Milburns awake hung over to find Vic dead from a gunshot through the heart and his wife Bette missing. Tony calls his friend, district attorney Danny Harrison to investigate. Bette arrives with Billy Arliss, at whose home she had slept. Because of their excessive drinking, no one can remember anything about what had happened the night before. As circumstantial evidence mounts against Tony, he calls in hypnotist Professor Karl Jones to help everyone try to recover their memories. Just as the professor is about to reveal the murderer, he is murdered.

Next to be killed is restaurateur Faronea. After Tony and Carlotta eavesdrop on him conferring with an accomplice at his restaurant, Faronea discovers them. Tony bluffs that he knows about the kidnapping plot and the accomplice murders Faronea. The couple returns home to find Bouclier murdered in his quarters. Friend Jake Whitridge responds to a frantic telephone call from Billy. Tony and Danny arrive, as they had planned with Billy, moments after Jake. Jake attacks Billy and knocks him out. When he regains consciousness Billy attempts to shoot Jake but Tony saves him. After the various spouses arrive, Tony announces he has solved the mystery.

Billy borrowed money from Vic on behalf of Jake, using a false name. Jake altered the check to be for $150,000 instead of $50,000 and Vic forced Billy to reveal he had borrowed the money for Jake. Jake shot Vic at Jake's home and brought his body to the party, where everyone assumed he was just passed out. Jake paid Bouclier to remain quiet, which is why Bouclier had to kill Professor Jones. Bouclier, Faronea's accomplice, killed Faronea after Tony spoke to him about the kidnapping plot. Jake then shot Bouclier. Danny places Jake under arrest and extracts a pledge from Tony and Carlotta to quit drinking. They agree and drink a toast to it.

== Cast ==
- Edward Arnold as Danny Harrison
- Robert Young as Tony Milburn
- Constance Cummings as Carlotta Milburn, Tony's wife
- George Meeker as Vic Huling
- Sally Eilers as Bette Huling, Vic's wife
- Reginald Denny as Jake Whitridge
- Louise Henry as Penny Whitridge, Jake's wife
- Gregory Ratoff as Faronea
- Robert Armstrong as Flannagan, the Milburns' mechanic
- Monroe Owsley as Billy Arliss
- Jack La Rue as Baptiste Bouclier, Vic's chauffeur (as Jack LaRue)
- Edward Brophy as Maxie, Harrison's assistant
- Gustav von Seyffertitz as Professor Karl Jones
- Rafaela Ottiano as Mme. Bouclier (as Rafael Ottiano)
- Arthur Treacher as Clarence Phelps, the butler
- E. E. Clive as Coroner's Photographer

== Production ==
Universal Studios head Carl Laemmle, Jr. was eager for James Whale, fresh from his great success with Bride of Frankenstein, to direct Dracula's Daughter. Whale was idle, waiting for Irene Dunne to finish work on Magnificent Obsession so she could begin work on Whale's Show Boat. Wary of directing two horror films in a row, Whale instead convinced Laemmle to buy the rights to a mystery novel called The Hangover Murders. Whale argued that the same sort of audiences who went to horror films also went to mystery films and pointed to the hit Metro-Goldwyn-Mayer film The Thin Man as evidence that a picture based on the novel would be a success. Laemmle agreed to buy the rights for $5,000, only after extracting a promise from Whale that he would direct Dracula's Daughter next.

Revelers drink champagne from a tureen with straws. The Production Code Administration urged Universal to curtail the amount of drinking in the film.

The Production Code Administration, which had gone into effect just weeks after the release of The Thin Man and which restricted the drinking of alcohol on-screen, disapproved of the project even before a script was written. PCA head Joseph Breen forbade the use of the word "hangover" in the title. Laemmle agreed and in mid-August temporarily retitled the project Wild Night before settling on Remember Last Night? in response to a survey of exhibitors. Breen dispatched two representatives to meet with Whale, Laemmle and studio censor Harry Zehner in an effort to reduce or eliminate the film's reliance on drinking. The two men realized that most of the alcohol use was required for the plot – and thus allowable under the Production Code – and Whale promised to keep the novel's ending in which Tony and Carlotta agree to quit drinking.

Harry Clork and Doris Malloy put together a 34-page treatment which Laemmle approved in April. The pair completed their draft on May 20, 1935. Whale had Dan Totheroh re-write the dialogue and the draft was ready for submission to the PCA on July 15. When Breen reviewed the draft, his objections centered on the excessive alcohol use. "We take this opportunity of pointing out to you, in regard to the matter of the treatment of drinking in this story, that, generally speaking, it is presented in a light, facetious, acceptable, amusing, and desirable mode of behavior. It is upon this that we feel rejection may be reasonably based." A revised script with the drinking toned down slightly was submitted on July 24, the same day Whale started shooting. Remember Last Night? was budgeted at $385,000. Whale inserted lines that made fun of horror pictures, a genre with which he no longer wished to be associated. Carlotta is shown jumping on a diving board flapping a towel and exclaiming "Look, I'm Dracula's Daughter!" and in another scene she says "I feel like the Bride of Frankenstein!" Shooting wrapped on September 14. Whale was nine days over schedule and $75,000 over budget.

== Release and reception ==
Remember Last Night? was cleared by the PCA on September 24, 1935, and following previews in October, opened on November 4. Financially the film was a failure that according to Laemmle lost money for the studio. Critical reception was mixed. The Hollywood Reporter called the film "a murder mystery to kid all murder mysteries" and "a riot of comedy spots superimposed on a riot of crime detecting". Whale, the reviewer found, "let himself go in a riotous directorial splurge". Although less effusive, The New York Times praised the film as "good minor fun" and noted the likeable pairing of Young and Cummings. Ed Brophy, Edward Arnold and Arthur Treacher were also singled out for praise. However, the Times concluded that Remember Last Night? should be enjoyed "in moderation" as the "halfwit behavior of the roisterers in the film" may make the viewer come away "with the feeling that one or two additional murders among the madcap principals would have made Long Island a still better place to live in". Variety was strongly disapproving of the film. "The women are more blotto than the men, and two of the wives are on the make. It's all faintly unwholesome."

Local censorship boards made numerous cuts to the film. The long drinking party scene was cut, as was part of a 30-second kiss between Tony and Carlotta that opened the film. Censors also cut a line of dialogue delivered by Louise Henry in response to Carlotta's declaration that the Marines had landed: "There'll be atrocities – I want to be first!" The film was never re-released, has never been released in any home video format and is rarely shown on television. Modern critical response has therefore been light, although Tom Milne of Time Out New York dubbed the film a "Delightful screwball parody of the detective thriller...Whale's use of elisions, non-sequiturs and unexpected stresses creates what is virtually a blueprint for the style developed by Robert Altman in and after MASH." The Los Angeles Times, reviewing the film for a 1999 retrospective of Whale's work, found it to be "an amusing trifle, tossed off with considerable wit and skill by Whale" and "pretty good fun if you’re in the mood for a chic, brittle period piece".
