= The Star Packer =

1934 film

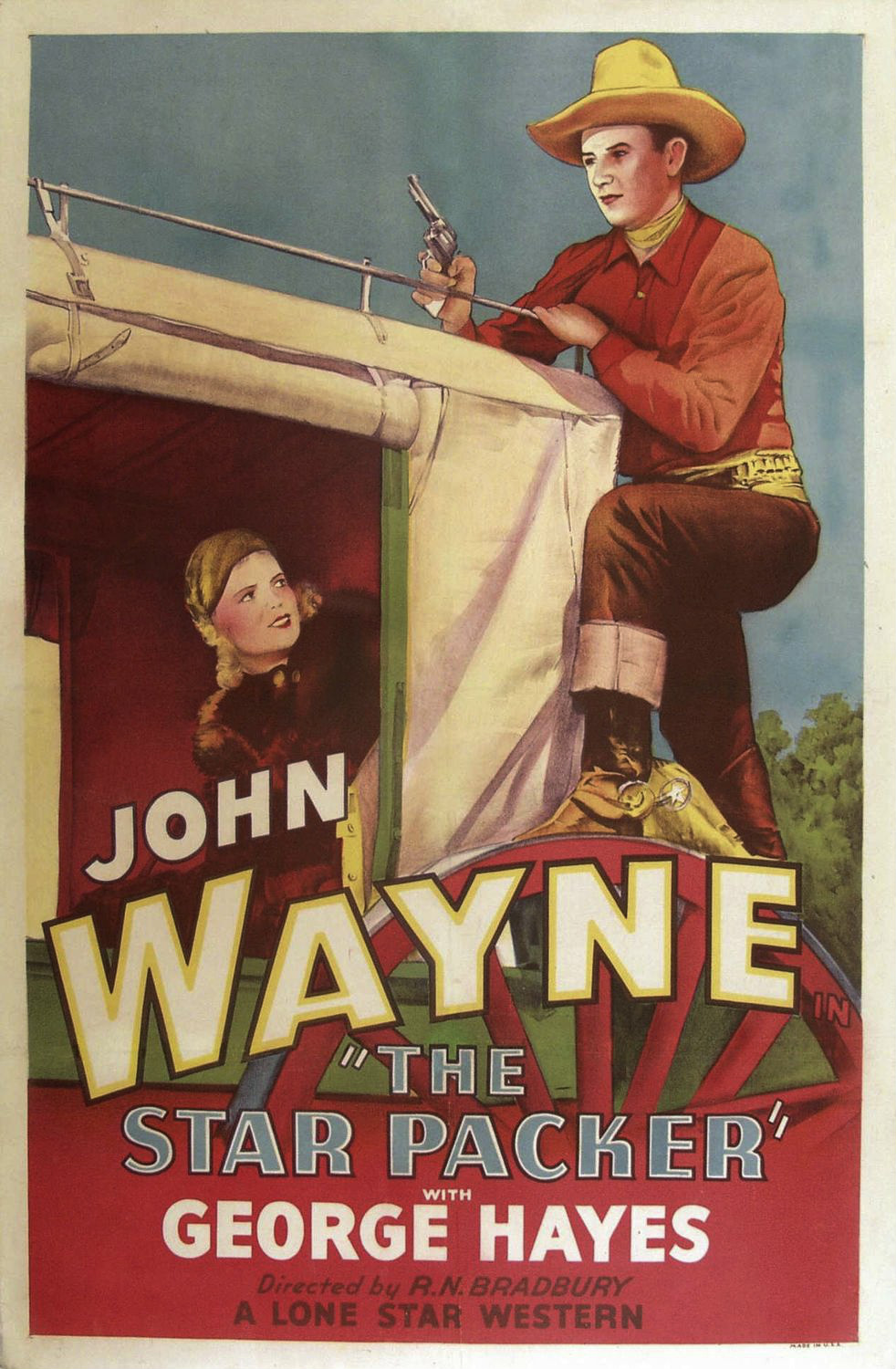
- Film poster
- Directed by: Robert N. Bradbury
- Produced by: Paul Malvern
- Starring: John Wayne; George "Gabby" Hayes
- Color process: black & white (later colorized)
- Distributed by: Monogram Pictures
- Release date: July 30, 1934
- Running time: 52-54 minutes
- Country: United States
- Language: English

The Star Packer (1934) by Robert N. Bradbury

The Star Packer is a 1934 Western film directed by Robert N. Bradbury and starring John Wayne, George "Gabby" Hayes, Yakima Canutt, and Verna Hillie.

== Plot ==
U.S. Marshal John Travers becomes the sheriff of a turn-of-the-20th century western town where several murders have occurred, hoping to flush out an outlaw known only as "The Shadow". He is aided by an Indian friend he asks to come help him. Anita Matlock, daughter of deceased, and niece of current Matlock ranch owner, arrives from back east at the same time.

After watching a stage holdup, Travers and his Indian friend discretely follow the robbers back to the town where the robbers are heard conversing with someone in what seems to be an empty room at the saloon, and later follow them to a hideout close to the Matlock ranch. In town, the "empty" room is found to have secret passages including a secret way to shoot people on the main street of town.

Out at Matlock ranch, Travers gives Anita a gun. Someone at the ranch telephones the robber's hideout to set up a road ambush on Travers and Anita, but Anita foils the plan with the gun given to her.

After arresting the suspected robbers, Travers makes one of them go back to the special room for instructions, where Travers overhears a plot to murder most of the town with a machine gun coming from the hideout on a wagon, and to murder him from the secret outlook onto the street.

He deputizes the townsfolk and they intercept the machine gun before it gets to town, and he shows them the secret outlook before it can be used to murder again.

Travers marries Anita, and his Indian friend plays Indians with their young son.

== Cast ==
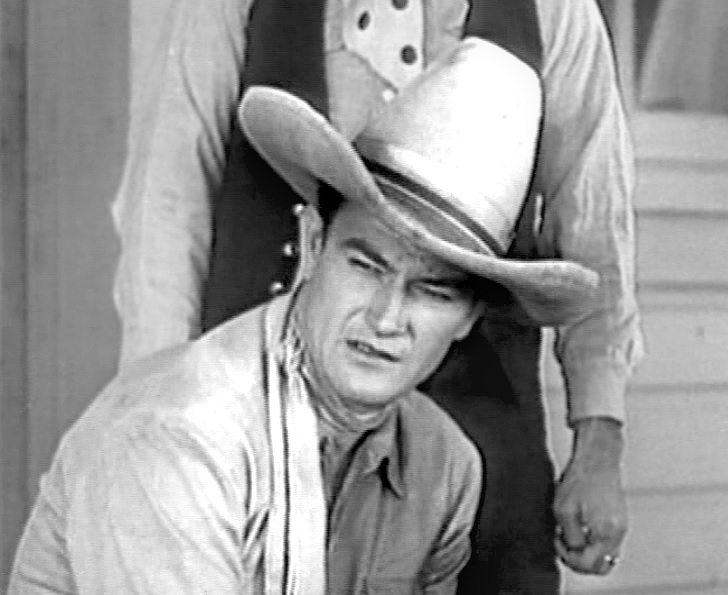
John Wayne

- John Wayne as U.S. Marshal John Travers
- George "Gabby" Hayes as Matt Matlock (credited as George Hayes)
- Verna Hillie as Anita Matlock, Matt Matlock's niece
- Yakima Canutt as Yak, Travers's Indian sidekick
- Billy Franey as henchman in the stump
- Eddie Parker as henchman Parker (credited as Ed Parker)
- Earl Dwire as henchman Mason
- Thomas G. Lingham as Sheriff Al Davis (credited as Tom Lingham)

== See also ==
- John Wayne filmography
