= Alison Skipworth =

English actress (1863–1952)

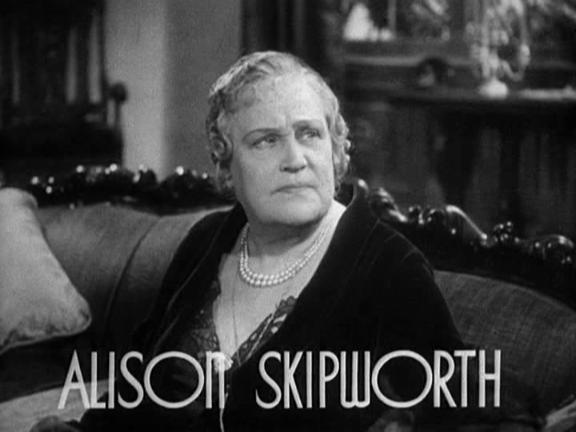
- Trailer for Satan Met a Lady (1936)
- Born: Alison Mary Elliott Margaret Groom; 25 July 1863; London, England
- Died: 5 July 1952 (aged 88); New York City, U.S.
- Occupation: Actress
- Years active: 1894–1938
- Spouse: Frank Markham Skipworth (m. 1882; div. 1929)

Alison Skipworth (born Alison Mary Elliott Margaret Groom; 25 July 1863–5 July 1952) was an English stage and screen actress.

== Early years ==
Skipworth was born in London. She was the daughter of Dr. Richard Ebenezer Groom and Elizabeth Rodgers, and she had a private education.

== Stage ==
Alison Skipworth made her first stage appearance at Daly's Theatre in London in 1894, in A Gaiety Girl. Her first American performance came the following year at the Broadway Theatre in New York City. She sang in light opera in An Artist's Model. In this production she served as understudy to Marie Tempest. After performing in two London plays, Skipworth returned to the United States, and made it her home. She joined the company of Daniel Frohman at the Lyceum. There she made her debut as Mrs. Ware in The Princess and the Butterfly in 1897.

In 1905 and 1906 Skipworth toured with Viola Allen in three productions of Shakespeare, Cymbeline, Twelfth Night, and As You Like It. In the following years she played with James K. Hackett and John Drew, Jr., among other theatre celebrities. Productions in which she was featured are The Torch-Bearers, The Swan, The Enchanted April, The Grand Duchess and the Waiter, Lily of the Valley, Mrs. Dane's Defence and Marseilles.

== Film ==
Skipworth appeared in her first film in 1912, A Mardi Gras Mix-Up. The same year she performed in The Pilgrimage, Into the Jungle, and A Political Kidnapping. In 1930 she made her first talkie, Strictly Unconventional. Skipworth appeared opposite W. C. Fields as his foil in four films: If I Had a Million (1932), Tillie and Gus (1933), Alice in Wonderland (1933), and Six of a Kind (1934). Her film career continued until 1938 with many major supporting roles. Her later screen credits include The Casino Murder Case, The Girl from 10th Avenue, King of the Newsboys, Wide Open Faces, and Ladies in Distress.

== Personal life ==
In 1882, Skipworth married Frank Markham Skipworth, an artist for whom she modeled; they later divorced.

== Filmography ==
- A Mardi Gras Mix-Up (1912, Short) - The Doctor's Wife
- The Pilgrimage (1912, Short) - William's Mother
- Into the Jungle (1912, Short)
- A Political Kidnapping (1912, Short)
- 39 East (1920) - Mrs. de Mailly
- Handcuffs or Kisses (1921) - Miss Strodd
- Big Pal (1925) - Agatha Briggs, truant officer (*uncredited)
- Strictly Unconventional (1930) - Lady Catherine Champion-Chene
- Raffles (1930) - Lady Kitty Melrose
- Outward Bound (1930) - Mrs. Cliveden-Banks
- Du Barry, Woman of Passion (1930) - La Gourdan
- Oh, For a Man! (1930) - Laura
- The Virtuous Husband (1931) - Mrs. Olwell
- The Night Angel (1931) - Countess von Martini
- Devotion (1931) - Mrs.Matilda Coggins
- The Road to Singapore (1931) - Mrs. Wey-Smith
- Tonight or Never (1931) - Marchesa Bianca San Giovanni
- The Unexpected Father (1932) - Mrs. Hawkins
- High Pressure (1932) - Mrs. Miller (uncredited)
- Sinners in the Sun (1932) - Mrs. Blake
- Madame Racketeer (1932) - Countess von Claudwig / Martha Hicks
- Night After Night (1932) - Miss Mabel Jellyman
- If I Had a Million (1932) - Emily La Rue
- Tonight Is Ours (1933) - Grand Duchess Emilie
- He Learned About Women (1933) - Mme. Vivienne Pompadour
- A Lady's Profession (1933) - Beulah Bonnell
- The Song of Songs (1933) - Mrs. Rasmussen
- Midnight Club (1933) - Lady Barrett-Smythe
- Tillie and Gus (1933) - Tillie Winterbottom
- Alice in Wonderland (1933) - Duchess
- Six of a Kind (1934) - Mrs. K. Rumford
- Coming Out Party (1934) - Miss Gertrude Vanderdoe
- Wharf Angel (1934) - Mother Bright
- Shoot the Works (1934) - The Countess
- The Notorious Sophie Lang (1934) - Aunt Nellie
- The Captain Hates the Sea (1934) - Mrs. Yolanda Magruder
- Here is My Heart (1934) - Countess Rostova
- The Casino Murder Case (1935) - Priscilla Kinkaid Llewellyn
- The Devil Is a Woman (1935) - Senora Perez
- The Girl from 10th Avenue (1935) - Mrs. Martin
- Becky Sharp (1935) - Miss Crawley
- Doubting Thomas (1935) - Mrs. Pampinelli
- Shanghai (1935) - Aunt Jane
- Dangerous (1935) - Mrs. Williams
- Hitch Hike Lady (1935) - Mrs. Amelia Blake
- The Princess Comes Across (1936) - Lady Gertrude
- Satan Met a Lady (1936) - Madame Barabbas
- The Gorgeous Hussy (1936) - Mrs. Beall
- Two in a Crowd (1936) - Lillie Eckleberger aka Lillie the Toad
- White Hunter (1936) - Aunt Frederika
- Stolen Holiday (1937) - Suzanne
- Two Wise Maids (1937) - Agatha Stanton / Old Lady Ironsides
- King of the Newsboys (1938) - Nora
- Wide Open Faces (1938) - Auntie Martha
- Ladies in Distress (1938) - Josephine Bonney (final film role)

== Sources ==
- The Times-News (Burlington, North Carolina), "Hollywood Gossip", 19 December 1933, page 7.
- The New York Times, "Alison Skipworth, actress, Dies at 88", 7 July 1952, page 21.
- Winnipeg Free Press, "Lyceum", 23 January 1936, page 24.
