= The Trail Beyond =

1934 film

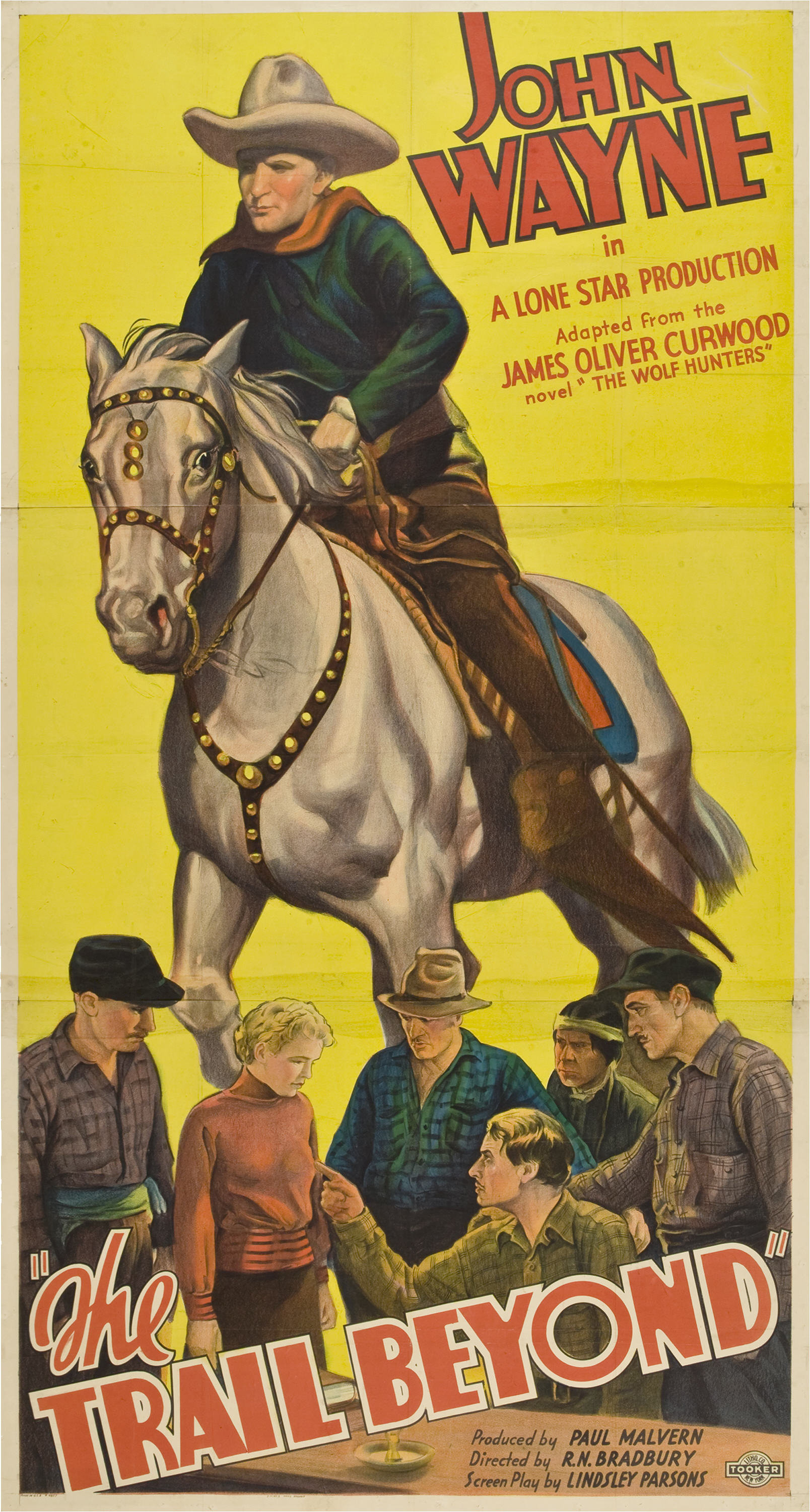
- Film poster
- Directed by: Robert N. Bradbury
- Written by: Lindsley Parsons (screenplay)
- Based on: The Wolf Hunters by James Oliver Curwood
- Produced by: Paul Malvern
- Starring: John Wayne
- Cinematography: Archie Stout
- Music by: Lee Zahler
- Distributed by: Monogram Pictures
- Release date: October 22, 1934
- Running time: 55 minutes
- Country: United States
- Language: English

The Trail Beyond is a 1934 Western film directed by Robert N. Bradbury and starring John Wayne, Noah Beery Sr., and Noah Beery Jr. The motion picture was based on the novel The Wolf Hunters by James Oliver Curwood, which was also adapted as a silent film (1926) and a later sound film (1949), both called The Wolf Hunters.

Location backgrounds filmed around Mammoth Lakes, California set this film firmly apart from most of the other Poverty Row westerns shot during the decade in which Wayne found himself trapped between his screen masterpieces The Big Trail (1930) and Stagecoach (1939).

== Plot ==
Rod Drew meets old friend Wabi on a train and later rescues him from some card cheats after one of them is killed. They make it to Fort Minnetaki and buy horses and new clothes. They are spotted by the Marshall and escape on horseback. The marshall informs the Mounties who send a man after them.

Rod and Wabi then find a rundown cabin with two skeletons inside, one of them holding a map with direction to a gold mine. They go to Wabinosh House, an isolated store owned by George Newsome. Also there is his daughter Felice, Wabi's girlfriend. They put the map in a safe but it is seen by George's helper Benoit. Benoit tells renegade LaRoque about the map and he tells Benoit to get it for him. Benoit cannot open the safe and kidnaps Felice instead who knows the combination. One of Benoit's henchman is knocked out by Felice and left behind where he is recognized by George. Rod and Wabi rescue Felice from LaRoque's hideout and return to George's store.

LaRoque sends Marie LaFleur to the store hoping that George will hire her to replace Benoit. She is then to steal the map. George hires her. When Rob hears her name, he is very interested, much to Felice's displeasure. Wabi noticed and tells Felice he won't let Rob come between them.

Rob and Wabi leave to look for the mine. Marie tells LaRoque, then Benoit tells LaRoque that a Mountie is after Rob and Wabi. LaRoque says they must not let the Mountie capture Rob and Wabi or they will have no chance to get the map. A "Mountie" captures Rob and Wabi and takes them to LaRoques hideout. LaRoque gets the map and ties Rod and Wabi up in a room, along with the real Mountie.

Rod tells Wabi the map LaRoque has is a fake and he has the real one. He, Wabi and the Mountie escape and follow the real map. The Mountie says Rod and Wabi are under arrest, but Rod says that they are still going after the mine. At the mine they find a lot of gold, and proof that Felice is a lost girl that Rod has been looking for all along. Wabi knew the truth but didn't want to lose Felice, though now he realizes she doesn't love him.

Rob, Wabi and the Mountie head back to the store by canoe, followed by LaRoque and his men who have realized their map is a fake. The Mountie is shot, but Rod tips LaRoque and his men out of their canoe. The Mountie almost goes over a waterfall, but Rod saves him. He and Wabi take the Mountie back to the store. They discover LaRoque and his whole gang are going to attack. The Mountie deputizes Rod to go to the nearest police station for help. George and Wabi discover that Benoit has taken most of their ammunition.

The gang attacks Wabinosh House, during which Marie sneaks some gold from the safe and gives it to LaRaoque before being captured. The Mounties arrive and capture the gang while Rod chases after LaRoque, followed by a Mountie, who eventually kills LaRoque. The card sharp wasn't killed in the card game fight and exonerated Wabi when he regained consciousness. Rob and Wabi are free from arrest. Wabi waves goodbye as Felice and Rob leave together by canoe to return and meet her uncle.

== Cast ==
- John Wayne as Rod Drew
- Verna Hillie as Felice Newsome
- Noah Beery Sr. as George Newsome
- Noah Beery Jr. as Wabi
- Robert Frazer as Jules LaRocque
- Iris Lancaster as Marie LaFleur
- James A. Marcus as Felice's uncle
- Eddie Parker as Ryan, the Mountie
- Earl Dwire as Henchman Benoit

== See also ==
- John Wayne filmography
- List of American films of 1934
