= The Casino Murder Case (film) =

1935 film by Edwin L. Marin

- theatrical release poster
- Directed by: Edwin L. Marin
- Written by: Ralph Spence (uncredited contributing writer)
- Screenplay by: Florence Ryerson; Edgar Allan Woolf
- Based on: the 1934 novel The Casino Murder Case by S. S. Van Dine
- Produced by: Lucien Hubbard
- Starring: Paul Lukas; Alison Skipworth
- Cinematography: Charles G. Clarke
- Edited by: Conrad A. Nervig
- Music by: Dimitri Tiomkin
- Production company: Metro-Goldwyn-Mayer
- Distributed by: Metro-Goldwyn-Mayer
- Release date: March 15, 1935
- Running time: 82, 84-85, or 87 minutes
- Country: United States
- Language: English

The Casino Murder Case is a 1935 American comedy-mystery motion picture starring Paul Lukas and Alison Skipworth. Rosalind Russell is in the supporting cast. It was directed by Edwin L. Marin from a screenplay by Florence Ryerson and Edgar Allan Woolf, based on the 1934 novel of the same name by S. S. Van Dine. It was the ninth film in the Philo Vance film series.

== Plot ==
Gentleman detective Philo Vance begins an investigation when he receives an anonymous letter stating that society man Lynn Llewellyn will be in danger when he appears at the casino owned by his uncle, Kinkaid. Vance visits the Llewellyn estate, which is run by Mrs. Priscilla Kinkaid-Llewellyn, the matriarch of the household, and stumbles into one of the family's many quarrels. At the end of the bitter quarrel, which involves Mrs. Llewellyn's son Lynn and his wife Virginia, Virginia announces that she has decided to leave the house and go to Chicago. During the tiff, Vance and Doris (Mrs. Llewellyn's secretary) are introduced to each other and Doris immediately takes a liking to Vance.

Vance takes Doris to his home, where he and District Attorney Markham show her the mysterious letter. Doris immediately recognizes the return address as being that of the Llewellyn's townhouse in Closter, and notices that the letter was typed on her typewriter. Vance assigns Sergeant Heath to help stake out the casino that night, but their presence does not prevent Lynn from suddenly collapsing at the card table. At the same time, Doris informs Vance that Virginia has died at the Llewellyn house. Markham begins his investigation of the murder by questioning Mrs. Llewellyn, who recalls having quarrelled with Virginia before she was poisoned, and Amelia, Mrs. Llewellyn's daughter, who admits that she too had a spat with Virginia. Meanwhile, Doris finds Mrs. Llewellyn's recently altered will, in which she disinherited Kinkaid, making it apparent that Lynn and Amelia would be the only ones who would benefit from Mrs. Llewellyn's death.

Other clues begin to surface, including Kinkaid's unusual collection of books on chemistry and poisons, and a loaded gun found in Virginia's bedroom. Soon after Lynn's recovery, Mrs. Llewellyn is found dead of an apparent suicide, with a note, bearing her signature, in which she confesses to Virginia's murder. Not convinced that the mystery has been solved, Vance pursues his theory, and discovers a secret laboratory where Kinkaid has been making the newly discovered heavy water; it is not yet known whether this is a poison. Kincaid holds Vance and Doris captive at gunpoint, but they escape. Still, Vance believes that Kinkaid is not the murderer, but is merely one of many decoys set up by the real killer to lead the investigation astray.

The real killer turns out to be Lynn, who gave himself a small dose of poison before. He lures Vance and Doris to the Closter townhouse to kill them. But before Lynn completes his "perfect crime", Vance reads from a letter he wrote earlier in which he detailed his theory about the killings. In it, Vance names Lynn as the murderer, calling him a rich, egomaniacal weakling, who, being tired of his wife, poisoned her and threw the blame on his uncle, whom he despised. After hearing Vance's summary of the murder plot, Lynn tells his captors that he has arranged to pin Vance and Doris' forthcoming murder on Kinkaid. However, when Lynn shoots Vance, Heath and others emerge from behind a door where they have been recording Lynn's confession and shoot him dead. After thanking Mrs. Llewellyn's maid Becky for loading Lynn's gun with blanks, Vance resumes his romance with Doris.

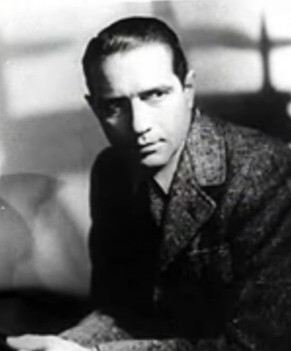
Donald Cook as Lynn in the trailer for the film

== Cast ==
- Paul Lukas as Philo Vance
- Alison Skipworth as Mrs. Priscilla Kinkaid Llewellyn
- Donald Cook as Lynn (Mrs. Llewellyn's son)
- Rosalind Russell as Doris (Mrs. Llewellyn's secretary-companion)
- Arthur Byron as Kinkaid (Mrs. Llewellyn's brother)
- Ted Healy as Sergeant Heath
- Eric Blore as Currie (Vance's butler)
- Isabel Jewell as Amelia (Mrs. Llewellyn's daughter)
- Louise Fazenda as Becky (maid)
- Purnell Pratt as Markham (District Attorney)
- Leslie Fenton as Dr. Kane (Llewellyns' doctor)
- Louise Henry as Virginia (Lynn Llewellyn's wife)
- Leo G. Carroll as Smith (Llewellyns' butler)
- Charles Sellon as Dr. Doremus (coroner)
- William Demarest as the auctioneer (uncredited)

Cast note:

- Rosalind Russell considered both the film and her performance in it to be "so bad". She wrote in her autobiography Life is a Banquet that MGM forced the role on her, and that afterward, her maid would tell her: "If you don't behave ... I'm going to tell people about that Casino Murder Case."

== Production ==
Originally William Powell and Myrna Loy were intended to star in The Casino Murder Case, but Powell was tired of playing Vance – he was the first actor to play the part on film, and had played the sleuth in four earlier Philo Vance features, as well as a short skit in Paramount on Parade – so MGM planned to use Otto Kruger, and then Fred Keating (who would have been borrowed from Columbia Pictures), Warren William, and Ricardo Cortez, before settling on Paul Lukas. Eugene Pallette was to have played the police sergeant, but was first replaced by Edward Brophy, and then Ted Healey. Constance Collier was to have played "Mrs. Llewellyn", before Alison Skipworth was borrowed from Paramount Pictures for the role.

== Critical response ==
Andre Sennwald in The New York Times wrote "Paul Lukas just isn't the Philo Vance type and his reticent drawing-room manner seems a feeble substitute for the dashing qualities which made William Powell the best of the cinema Philos. Rosalind Russell works very hard at being agreeable in the Myrna Loy style, but with no vast success. Miss Skipworth, of course, is characteristically excellent as the foolish dowager, and there are good performances by Arthur Byron as the chief suspect and the comical Ted Healy as the halfwit detective. The best work in the film, though, is contributed by Isabel Jewell as the morbid and dipsomaniac daughter of the house."

More recently, Turner Classic Movies called the film "a diverting series entry that was faithful to Van Dine's original story", and Allmovie agreed that Paul Lukas "is simply not the right type for the part" and that "it is largely because of Lukas that the film is not one of the better entries in the series." The review characterizes the work of Alison Skipworth and Isabel Jewell as "excellent" and Eric Blore and Charles Sellon as "strong" performances, but says that Rosalind Russell "hasn't quite yet hit her stride here." As a result, the mix of comedy and mystery in the film "isn't as smooth as one might wish."
