= Louise Henry (actress) =

American actress (1911–1967)

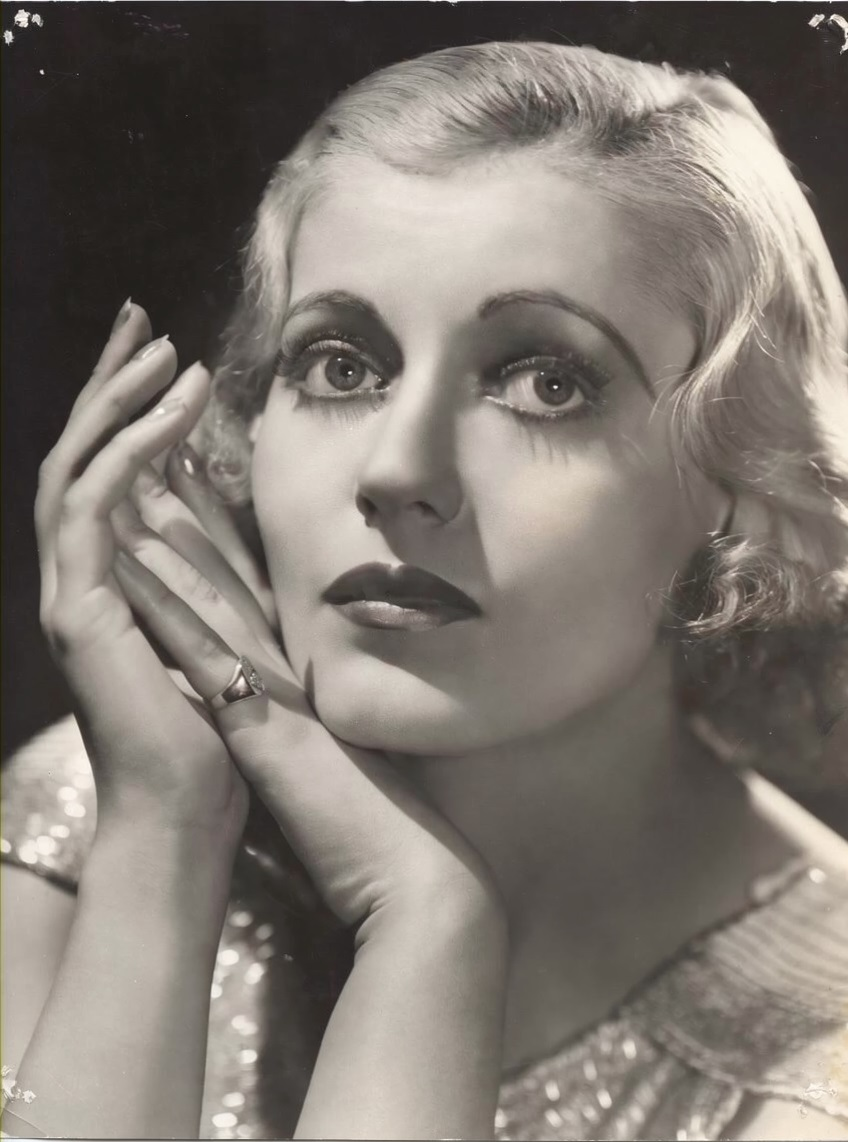
- Henry in the 1930s
- Born: Jessie Louise Heiman; June 14, 1911; Syracuse, New York, U.S.
- Died: February 17, 1967 (aged 55); New York City, U.S.
- Occupation: Actress
- Years active: 1934–1939
- Spouse: Samuel Robert Weltz

Jessie Louise Henry Weltz (June 14, 1911 – February 17, 1967) was an American film actress best known for working in Hollywood during the 1930s.

== Early years ==
Henry was born Jessie Louise Heiman, the daughter of Dr. Jesse Strauss Heiman, a physician, and his wife, stage actress Louise Henry Heiman. Her father was a Syracuse, New York, native and practiced medicine there until he moved the family to New York City when Henry was 4 years old. Between 1914 and 1916, Henry and her family lived at 1027 Genesee Street in Syracuse. She was educated at Marymount convent in Tarrytown until she reached the high-school level. At that point she went to Paris to study at a branch of Marymount.

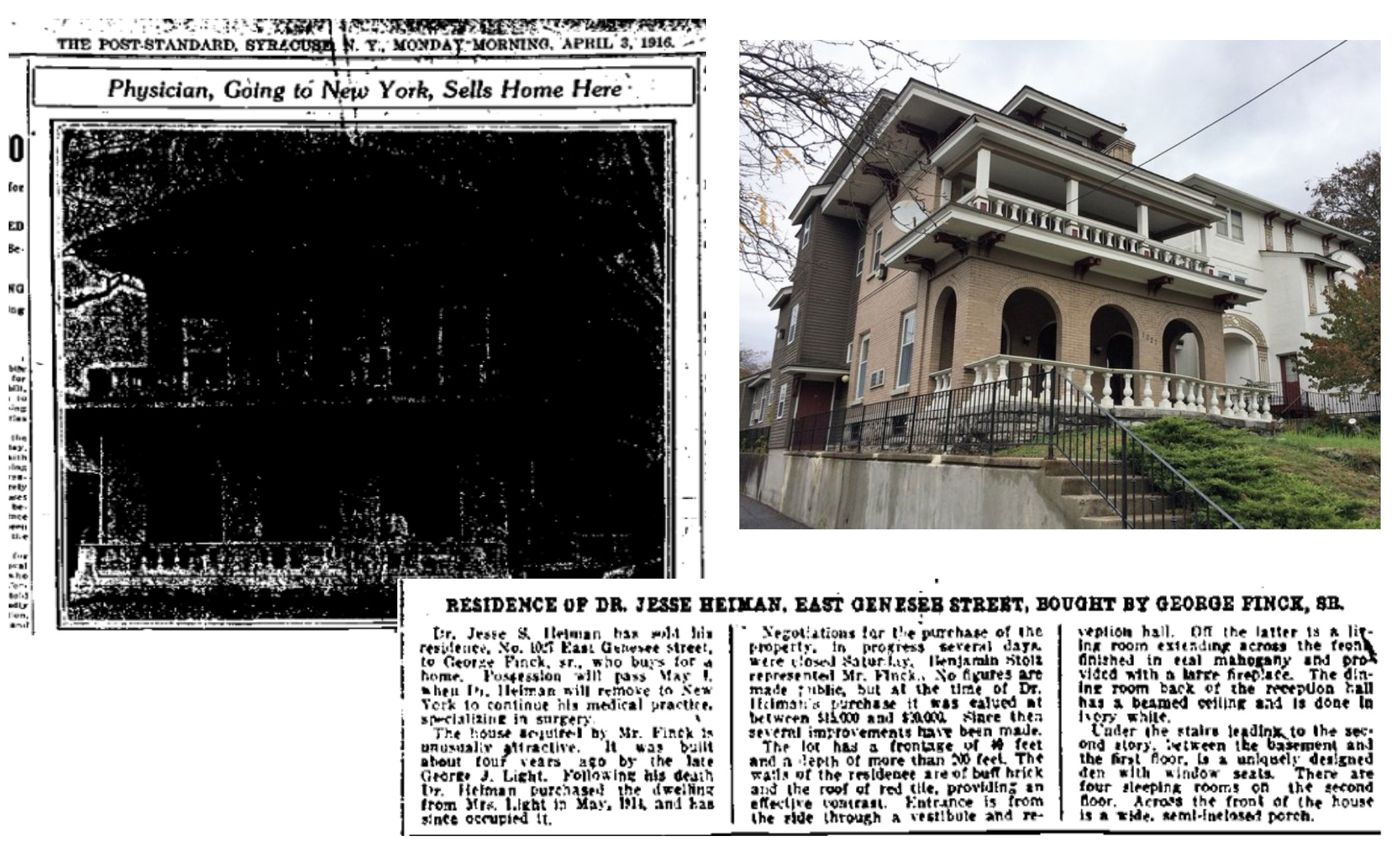
Heiman family home Syracuse N.Y.

== Career ==
Henry became fluent in French while studying in France. She began singing and dancing professionally, making her professional debut at 14 dancing at a party given in honor of the Duke of Connaught in Monte Carlo. She declined offers to entertain in Europe, preferring to study in New York and work in stock theater. She performed for several years with a stock company headed by Chamberlain Brown.

Henry went to London in the summer of 1933 to appear as "the American show girl" in a Seymour Hicks production. After returning to the United States, she sang at the Deauville Yacht Club in Miami. Her work there led to a screen test in New York, and the test resulted in a long-term film contract.

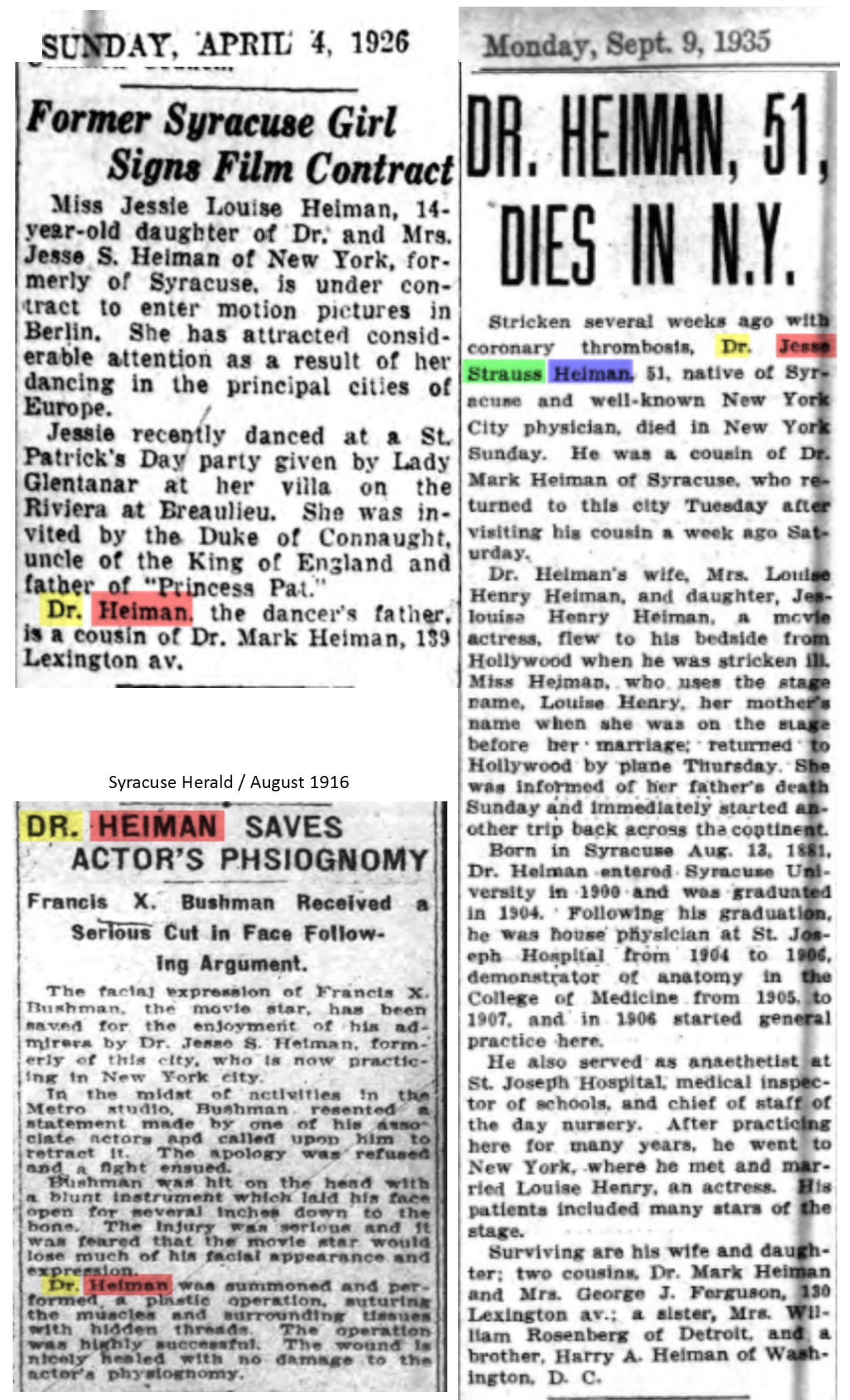
Syracuse newspaper articles re: Louise Heiman

== Death ==
Henry died of cancer in New York City on February 17, 1967, at the age of 55.

Henry is buried at Woodlawn Cemetery in The Bronx, New York.

== Filmography ==
Year	Title	Role	Notes
1934	Paris Interlude	Mary Louise	
1934	Hide-Out	Lilly - Singer	
1934	Forsaking All Others	Party Guest	Uncredited
1935	Society Doctor	Telephone Operator	
1935	One New York Night	Ermine	
1935	The Casino Murder Case	Virginia Llewellyn	
1935	Reckless	Louise	
1935	No More Ladies	Party Guest Playing Charades	Uncredited
1935	Calm Yourself	Bobby's Secretary	Uncredited
1935	The Murder Man	Lillian Hopper	
1935	King Solomon of Broadway	Nikki Bradbury	
1935	Remember Last Night?	Penny Whitridge	
1935	In Old Kentucky	Arlene Shattuck	
1936	Exclusive Story	Tess Graham	
1936	End of the Trail	Belle Pearson	
1937	The Hit Parade	Monica Barrett	
1937	Charlie Chan on Broadway	Billie Bronson	
1937	There Goes the Groom	Janet Russell	
1937	45 Fathers	Elizabeth Carter	
1938	The Gaunt Stranger	Cora Ann Milton	
1939	Charlie Chan in Reno	Jeanne Bently	(final film role)
