= Harry Clork =

American screenwriter (1888-1978)

- Born: Harry W. Prince; August 31, 1888; Galveston, Texas, USA
- Died: June 18, 1978 (aged 89); Santa Monica, California, USA
- Other names: Harry Clarke
- Occupation: Screenwriter
- Spouse(s): Nora Bayes (div.); Mildred MacLeod
- Parent(s): Creston Clarke (father); Adelaide Prince (mother)

Harry Clork (born Harry Prince, and sometimes credited as Harry Clarke) was an American screenwriter and playwright who wrote over three dozen films between 1935 and 1955.

== Biography ==
Harry was born to English actress Lena Adelaide Rubenstein (known professionally as Adelaide Prince) and her first husband, Harry Prince. After his parents divorced, his mother married Creston Clarke, and Harry later adopted his last name (but changed the "a" to an "o," and dropped the final "e" to be able to join the writers' union once he began working as a screenwriter; there was already another Harry Clark).

After moving to New York and establishing himself first as a performer (chiefly in vaudeville productions), and second as a playwright, penning a number of works that hit Broadway, he broke into screenwriting in the mid-1930s. Some of his earliest efforts while under contract at Universal included 1935's Mister Dynamite and Diamond Jim. Over the ensuing two decades, he'd write a wide range of films at Universal, MGM, and Paramount, also dabbling in television writing toward the end of his career. Early on, he collaborated with fellow screenwriter Doris Malloy.

He had retired by the 1970s; he died on June 18, 1978, and was survived by his daughter (from his second marriage to actress Mildred MacLeod). Earlier in life, he had been briefly married to Broadway actress Nora Bayes.

== Selected filmography ==
- Ma and Pa Kettle at Waikiki (1955)
- Painting the Clouds with Sunshine (1951)
- Tea for Two (1950)
- The Sainted Sisters (1948)
- The Mighty McGurk (1947)
- The Thrill of Brazil (1947)
- See My Lawyer (1945)
- Broadway Rhythm (1944)
- Ship Ahoy (1942)
- Born to Sing (1942)
- Down in San Diego (1941)
- Whistling in the Dark (1941)
- Las Vegas Nights (1941)
- The Reluctant Dragon (1941)
- Moon Over Burma (1940)
- And One Was Beautiful (1940)
- Laugh It Off (1938)
- Flirting with Fate (1938)
- New Faces of 1937 (1937
- When's Your Birthday? (1937)
- Flying Hostess (1936
- Absolute Quiet (1936)
- Remember Last Night? (1935)
- His Night Out (1935)
- King Solomon of Broadway (1935)
- Diamond Jim (1935)
- Mister Dynamite (1935)
