= His Night Out =

1935 film by William Nigh

- Directed by: William Nigh
- Screenplay by: Harry Clork; Doris Malloy
- Story by: Charles Christensen
- Produced by: Irving Starr
- Starring: Edward Everett Horton; Irene Hervey; Jack La Rue; Robert McWade; Lola Lane; Willard Robertson
- Cinematography: Edward Snyder
- Edited by: Daniel Mandell
- Production company: Universal Pictures
- Distributed by: Universal Pictures
- Release date: October 1, 1935
- Running time: 67 minutes
- Country: United States
- Language: English

His Night Out is a 1935 American comedy film directed by William Nigh and written by Harry Clork and Doris Malloy. The film stars Edward Everett Horton, Irene Hervey, Jack La Rue, Robert McWade, Lola Lane and Willard Robertson. The film was released on October 1, 1935, by Universal Pictures.

== Cast ==
- Edward Everett Horton as Homer B. Bitts
- Irene Hervey as Peggy Taylor
- Jack La Rue as Joe Ferranza
- Robert McWade as Davis
- Lola Lane as Lola
- Willard Robertson as J.J. Trent
- Oscar Apfel as Dr. Kraft
- Theodore von Eltz as Parsons
- Clara Kimball Young as Mrs. Davis
- Ward Bond as Lanky
- George Cleveland as Detective
- Jack Mulhall as Salesman
- Jack Norton as Dr. Singer
- Dewey Robinson as Beef
- Bill Burrud as Jimmie
