= Doris Malloy =

American screenwriter

- Born: May 11, 1901; Gloversville, New York, USA
- Died: November 6, 1955 (aged 54); Los Angeles, California, USA
- Occupation: Screenwriter
- Years active: 1926–1943

Doris Malloy (1901–1955) was an American screenwriter active during the 1920s through the 1940s.

== Biography ==
Born in Gloversville, New York, in 1901 to Henry Malloy (noted as a "prominent gambler" in a few publicity items) and Kate Huckans, Doris worked as an ambulance woman in Europe during World War I, before becoming a studio stenographer at Universal for screenwriter Raymond L. Schrock and then a script reader in Hollywood.

She even took her experience working as an ambulance driver in combat zones during World War I and used it to inform The Mad Parade, one of her first screenwriting assignments, which she co-wrote with Gertrude Orr. "There was a time when a screen story without the conventional 'sweethearts' would have been laughed off the lot," Malloy said at the time, noting that she and Orr took great pains to show women's wartime experiences in an accurate light.

Over the course of her career, Malloy worked under contract at various points at most of the major studios. She specialized in writing B-movie thrillers, war stories, crime dramas, and screwball comedies. By the mid-1930s, she had partnered with veteran screenwriter Harry Clork, and the pair became an in-demand duo around town; their co-written scripts include Mister Dynamite and Diamond Jim.

Malloy was married and divorced several times, according to an item from gossip columnist Sidney Skolsky. In 1943, she and Lieut. J.M. O'Neill reportedly tied the knot; she retired from the industry afterward. In 1955, shortly before her death, she became a realtor at English & Douglas in Studio City, California.

== Selected filmography ==
- Hitler's Madman (1943)
- My Son, the Hero (1943)
- Corregidor (1943)
- Stand By All Networks (1942)
- Ridin' on a Rainbow (1941)
- Nobody's Children (1940)
- Mickey the Kid (1939)
- Love on Toast (1937)
- On Such a Night (1937)
- Midnight Madonna (1937)
- Outcast (1937)
- Two in a Crowd (1936)
- Human Cargo (1936)
- Too Many Parents (1936)
- Remember Last Night? (1935)
- His Night Out (1935)
- King Solomon of Broadway (1935)
- Diamond Jim (1935)
- Mister Dynamite (1935)
- Princess O'Hara (1935)
- I Am a Thief (1934)
- Gambling Lady (1934)
- Bondage (1933)
- Amateur Daddy (1932)
- The Mad Parade (1931)
